= 1985 United Kingdom local elections =

- 2 May 1985 (England & Wales); 15 May 1985 (Northern Ireland)

All 39 non-metropolitan counties, 1 sui generis authority, all 26 Northern Irish districts and all 8 Welsh counties
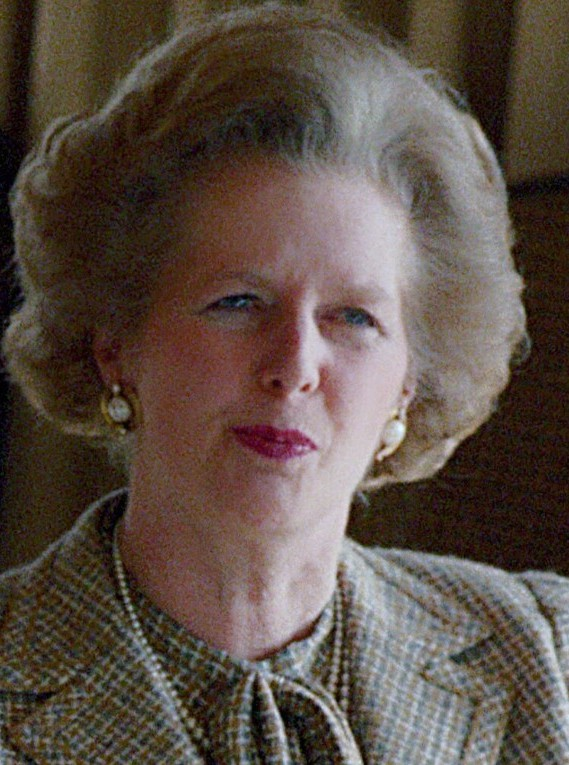

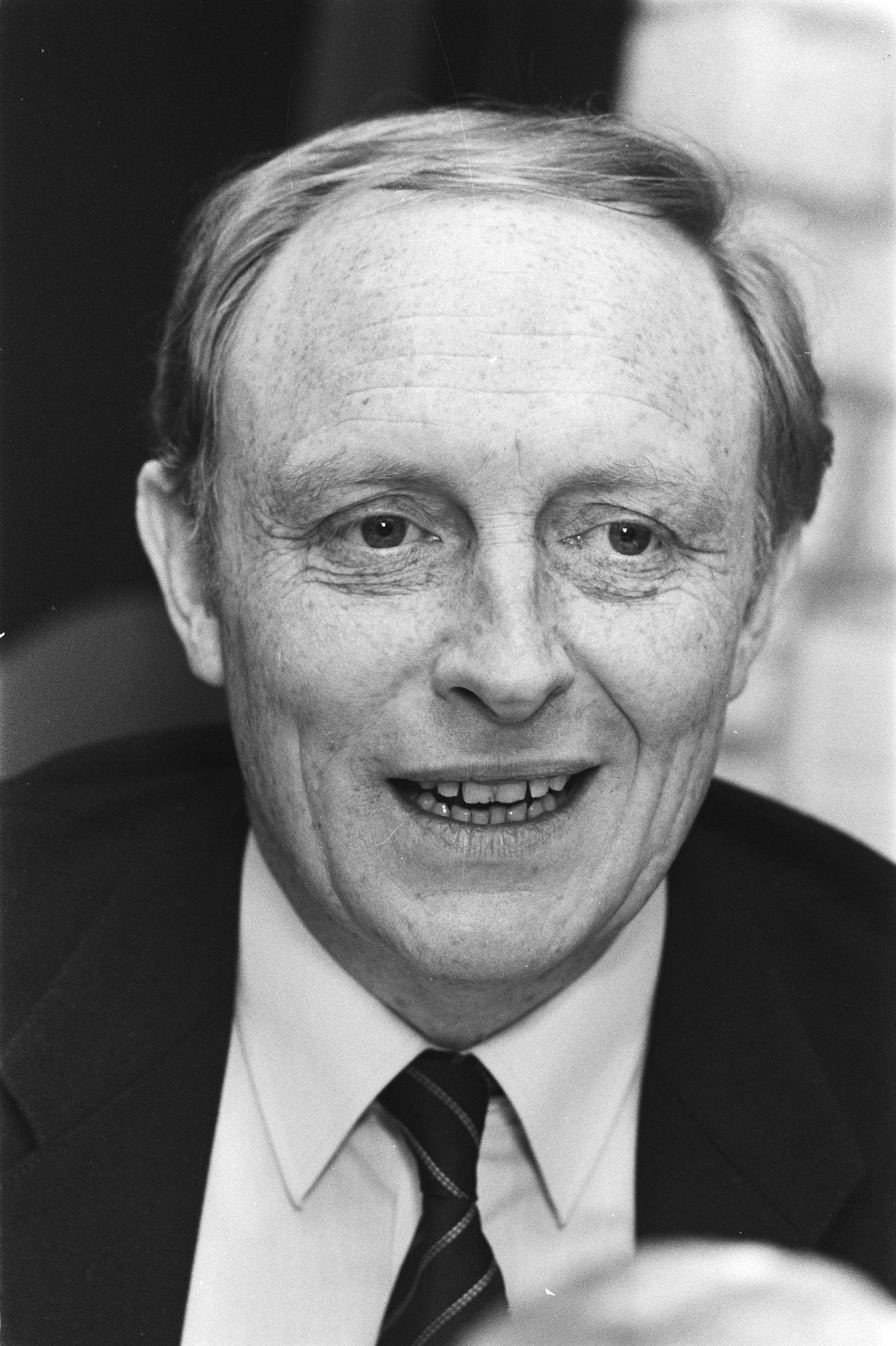

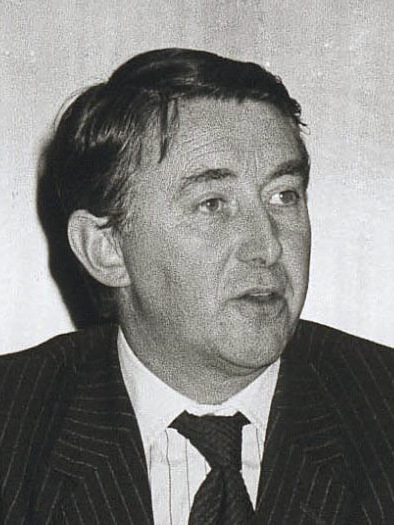

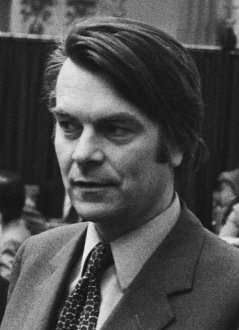
	Majority party	Minority party	Third party
Leader	Margaret Thatcher	Neil Kinnock	David Steel and David Owen
Party	Conservative	Labour	Alliance
Leader since	11 February 1975	2 October 1983	7 July 1976 and 21 June 1983
Percentage	32%	39%	26%
Councillors	10,191	8,746	2,633
Councillors +/-	▼202	▼124	▲302
- Colours denote the winning party, as shown in the main table of results.

The 1985 United Kingdom local elections were held on Thursday 2 May 1985 in England and Wales, and Wednesday 15 May 1985 in Northern Ireland. Labour had the largest share of the vote in local council elections for the first time since 1981.

Both Conservatives and Labour lost some seats to the Liberal-SDP Alliance, who were rebuilding with the SDP under the leadership of David Owen and enjoying strong showings — including a brief lead — in the opinion polls.

== Results ==
Alan Clark, writing in his diary for 11 May 1985, shortly after the election, stated: "Some stupid prick has done a 'projection' in one of the heavies showing that the SDP will have a massive overall majority in the House of Commons.."

== England ==
=== Non-metropolitan county councils ===
Council	Previous control	Result	Details
Avon	Labour	No overall control gain	Details
Bedfordshire ‡	No overall control	No overall control hold	Details
Berkshire ‡	No overall control	Conservative gain	Details
Buckinghamshire ‡	Conservative	Conservative hold	Details
Cambridgeshire ‡	Conservative	No overall control gain	Details
Cheshire	No overall control	No overall control hold	Details
Cleveland ‡	Labour	Labour hold	Details
Cornwall ‡	Independent	No overall control gain	Details
Cumbria	Labour	No overall control gain	Details
Derbyshire	Labour	Labour hold	Details
Devon ‡	Conservative	No overall control gain	Details
Dorset ‡	Conservative	Conservative hold	Details
Durham	Labour	Labour hold	Details
East Sussex ‡	Conservative	No overall control gain	Details
Essex	Conservative	No overall control gain	Details
Gloucestershire ‡	No overall control	No overall control hold	Details
Hampshire	Conservative	No overall control gain	Details
Hereford and Worcester ‡	Conservative	Conservative hold	Details
Hertfordshire	Conservative	No overall control gain	Details
Humberside	Labour	No overall control gain	Details
Isle of Wight	Alliance	Alliance hold	Details
Kent	Conservative	Conservative hold	Details
Lancashire	Labour	No overall control gain	Details
Leicestershire ‡	No overall control	No overall control hold	Details
Lincolnshire	Conservative	Conservative hold	Details
Norfolk ‡	Conservative	Conservative hold	Details
North Yorkshire ‡	Conservative	No overall control gain	Details
Northamptonshire	No overall control	No overall control hold	Details
Northumberland	Labour	No overall control gain	Details
Nottinghamshire	Labour	Labour hold	Details
Oxfordshire ‡	Conservative	No overall control gain	Details
Shropshire	No overall control	No overall control hold	Details
Somerset	Conservative	No overall control gain	Details
Staffordshire	Labour	Labour hold	Details
Suffolk ‡	Conservative	Conservative hold	Details
Surrey	Conservative	Conservative hold	Details
Warwickshire	No overall control	No overall control hold	Details
West Sussex ‡	Conservative	Conservative hold	Details
Wiltshire ‡	Conservative	No overall control gain	Details

‡ New electoral division boundaries

=== Sui generis ===
Council	Previous control	Result	Details
Isles of Scilly			Details

== Northern Ireland ==
Council	Previous control	Result	Details
Antrim	No overall control	No overall control	Details
Ards	No overall control	No overall control	Details
Armagh	No overall control	UUP	Details
Ballymena	DUP	DUP	Details
Ballymoney	No overall control	No overall control	Details
Banbridge	UUP	UUP	Details
Belfast	No overall control	No overall control	Details
Carrickfergus	No overall control	No overall control	Details
Castlereagh	No overall control	No overall control	Details
Coleraine	No overall control	No overall control	Details
Cookstown	No overall control	No overall control	Details
Craigavon	No overall control	No overall control	Details
Derry	SDLP	No overall control	Details
Down	No overall control	No overall control	Details
Dungannon	No overall control	No overall control	Details
Fermanagh	No overall control	No overall control	Details
Larne	No overall control	No overall control	Details
Limavady	No overall control	No overall control	Details
Lisburn	No overall control	No overall control	Details
Magherafelt	No overall control	No overall control	Details
Moyle	No overall control	No overall control	Details
Newry and Mourne	SDLP	No overall control	Details
Newtownabbey	No overall control	No overall control	Details
North Down	No overall control	No overall control	Details
Omagh	No overall control	No overall control	Details
Strabane	No overall control	No overall control	Details

== Wales ==
=== County councils ===
Council	Previous control	Result	Details
Clwyd	No overall control	No overall control hold	Details
Dyfed	No overall control	No overall control hold	Details
Gwent	Labour	Labour hold	Details
Gwynedd	Independent	Independent hold	Details
Mid Glamorgan	Labour	Labour hold	Details
Powys	Independent	Independent hold	Details
South Glamorgan	Labour	Labour hold	Details
West Glamorgan	Labour	Labour hold	Details
