= 1973 West Glamorgan County Council election =

1973 Welsh local government election

The first election to West Glamorgan County Council was held in April 1973. It was followed by the 1977 election.

The new authority came into effect from 1 April 1974 following the division of the former Glamorgan County Council into three new authorities.

== Candidates ==
A feature of the election was that the new authority replaced both the existing Glamorgan County Council and the Swansea County Borough Council. In addition, the number of borough and district councils within the new county was reduced to four, namely Swansea City Council, Afan Borough Council, Lliw Valley Borough Council and Neath Borough Council. In many cases members of the former authorities found themselves competing for a reduced number of seats.

The Labour Party fielded candidates in every ward. A significant proportion of seats were contested by the Conservative Party and Plaid Cymru with fewer candidates fielded by the Liberal Party.

In the Port Talbot area, Lord Heycock was returned unopposed but other Labour candidates faced opposition from Ratepayers and Tenant Association candidates. At Cwmavon, Alderman Mel John, serving mayor of the borough, contested the seat as a Progressive Labour candidate having failed to gain the official nomination.

== Outcome ==
Labour won a decisive victory, winning support across the new county.

In the Neath area, Labour won eleven of the thirteen seats. The only successful candidates from other parties were Martin Thomas (Independent) at Coedffranc, who served on the former Glamorgan County Council and Huw Evans (Plaid Cymru), at Dulais Higher and Crynant. Evans was the prospective Plaid Cymru parliamentary candidate for the Neath constituency.

Labour also won most of the seats in the Port Talbot area but suffered some defeats at the hands of Ratepayer candidates. At Cwmavon, a sitting member of Glamorgan County Council was defeated by Mel John, who had failed to win the party nomination.

== Results ==
o indicates sitting councillor on Glamorgan County Council or Swansea City Council prior to 1973 election

A indicates sitting alderman on Glamorgan County Council or Swansea City Council prior to 1973 election

== Ward results ==
=== Aberavon East and West (three seats) ===
Aberavon East and West 1973
| Party | Candidate | Votes | % | ±% |
|---|---|---|---|---|
| Labour | Jim Warren | 3,374 | | |
| Labour | Colin Crowley | 2,906 | | |
| Labour | Cyril Lewis^{o} | 2,889 | | |
| Residents | Laurie Stanton | 2,371 | | |
| Residents | Jim Roberts | 2,280 | | |
| Turnout | | | 48.3 | |
| Labour win (new seat) | | | | |
| Labour win (new seat) | | | | |
| Labour win (new seat) | | | | |

=== Aberavon North (one seat) ===
Aberavon North 1973
| Party | Candidate | Votes | % | ±% |
|---|---|---|---|---|
| Labour | Douglas Heatley | 1,829 | | |
| Ratepayers | Reg Raikes | 1,584 | | |
| Turnout | | | 53.5 | |
| Labour win (new seat) | | | | |

=== Aberavon South (one seat) ===
Aberavon South 1973
| Party | Candidate | Votes | % | ±% |
|---|---|---|---|---|
| Labour | Idwal Hopkin | 1,319 | | |
| Ratepayers | Hilda Cuss | 733 | | |
| Turnout | | | 52.8 | |
| Labour win (new seat) | | | | |

=== Brynmelyn (two seats) ===
Brynmelyn 1973
| Party | Candidate | Votes | % | ±% |
|---|---|---|---|---|
| Labour | J. Adams | Unopposed | | |
| Labour | R. Dowdle | Unopposed | | |
| Labour win (new seat) | | | | |
| Labour win (new seat) | | | | |

=== Castle (two seats) ===
Castle 1973
| Party | Candidate | Votes | % | ±% |
|---|---|---|---|---|
| Labour | B. Ludham | Unopposed | | |
| Labour | E. Knill | Unopposed | | |
| Labour win (new seat) | | | | |
| Labour win (new seat) | | | | |

=== Cwmafan (one seat) ===
Cwmafan 1973
| Party | Candidate | Votes | % | ±% |
|---|---|---|---|---|
| Progressive | Mel John | 1,548 | | |
| Labour | Leslie Richards^{o} | 1,026 | | |
| Turnout | | | 67.9 | |
| Progressive win (new seat) | | | | |

=== Fforest Fach (two seats) ===
Fforest Fach 1973
| Party | Candidate | Votes | % | ±% |
|---|---|---|---|---|
| Labour | Victor Cyril Alexander | 2,471 | | |
| Labour | D. Bevan | 2,297 | | |
| Conservative | David Mercer | 1,249 | | |
| Conservative | R. Hinds | 1,185 | | |
| Turnout | | | 38.9 | |
| Labour win (new seat) | | | | |
| Labour win (new seat) | | | | |

=== Ffynone (two seats) ===
Ffynone 1973
| Party | Candidate | Votes | % | ±% |
|---|---|---|---|---|
| Conservative | Paul Valerio | 1,732 | | |
| Conservative | T. Thomas | 1,715 | | |
| Labour | P. McCallum | 889 | | |
| Turnout | | | 38.2 | |
| Conservative win (new seat) | | | | |
| Conservative win (new seat) | | | | |

=== Glyncorrwg (two seats) ===
Glyncorrwg 1973
| Party | Candidate | Votes | % | ±% |
|---|---|---|---|---|
| Labour | D. Daniels | Unopposed | | |
| Labour | G. Davies | Unopposed | | |
| Labour win (new seat) | | | | |
| Labour win (new seat) | | | | |

=== Gower No.1 (one seat) ===
Gower No.1 1973
| Party | Candidate | Votes | % | ±% |
|---|---|---|---|---|
| Liberal | B. Keal | Unopposed | | |
| Liberal win (new seat) | | | | |

=== Gower No.2 (one seat) ===
Gower No.2 1973
| Party | Candidate | Votes | % | ±% |
|---|---|---|---|---|
| Labour | F. Lord | 1,644 | | |
| Ratepayers | D. Thomas | 1,121 | | |
| Turnout | | | 60.5 | |
| Labour win (new seat) | | | | |

=== Gower No.3 (one seat) ===
Gower No.3 1973
| Party | Candidate | Votes | % | ±% |
|---|---|---|---|---|
| Liberal | G. Beynon | 1,682 | | |
| Labour | V. Watters | 642 | | |
| Turnout | | | 47.4 | |
| Liberal win (new seat) | | | | |

=== Landore (two seats) ===
Landore 1973
| Party | Candidate | Votes | % | ±% |
|---|---|---|---|---|
| Labour | D. Cox | Unopposed | | |
| Labour | S. John | Unopposed | | |
| Labour win (new seat) | | | | |
| Labour win (new seat) | | | | |

=== Llansamlet (two seats) ===
Llansamlet 1973
| Party | Candidate | Votes | % | ±% |
|---|---|---|---|---|
| Labour | T. Lloyd-Jones | 3,009 | | |
| Labour | L. Penhaligan | 2,623 | | |
| Plaid Cymru | John Ball | 1,232 | | |
| Communist | E. Bevan | 366 | | |
| Turnout | | | 41.2 | |
| Labour win (new seat) | | | | |
| Labour win (new seat) | | | | |

=== Llwchwr No.1 (one seat) ===
Llwchwr No.1 1973
| Party | Candidate | Votes | % | ±% |
|---|---|---|---|---|
| Labour | W. Jones | 1,597 | | |
| Independent | Cled Morgan | 1,184 | | |
| Turnout | | | 62.3 | |
| Labour win (new seat) | | | | |

=== Llwchwr No.2 (two seats) ===
Llwchwr No.2 1973
| Party | Candidate | Votes | % | ±% |
|---|---|---|---|---|
| Labour | D. Davies | 2,782 | | |
| Labour | J. Jones | 2,270 | | |
| Liberal | C. Thomas | 1,702 | | |
| Independent Labour | M. Thomas | 1,574 | | |
| Turnout | | | 69.8 | |
| Labour win (new seat) | | | | |
| Labour win (new seat) | | | | |

=== Llwchwr No.3 (two seats) ===
Llwchwr No.3 1973
| Party | Candidate | Votes | % | ±% |
|---|---|---|---|---|
| Labour | J. Thomas | 2,495 | | |
| Labour | D. Turner | 2,222 | | |
| Liberal | H. Griffiths | 1,514 | | |
| Conservative | N. Williams | 1,457 | | |
| Turnout | | | 73.0 | |
| Labour win (new seat) | | | | |
| Labour win (new seat) | | | | |

=== Margam Central (one seat) ===
Margam Central 1973
| Party | Candidate | Votes | % | ±% |
|---|---|---|---|---|
| Labour | Llewellyn Heycock^{o} | Unopposed | | |
| Labour win (new seat) | | | | |

=== Margam North (one seat) ===
Margam North 1973
| Party | Candidate | Votes | % | ±% |
|---|---|---|---|---|
| Labour | Wilf Mitchell^{o} | 781 | | |
| Ratepayers | Clyde Penhale | 682 | | |
| Turnout | | | 60.0 | |
| Labour win (new seat) | | | | |

=== Margam West (one seat) ===
Margam West 1973
| Party | Candidate | Votes | % | ±% |
|---|---|---|---|---|
| Ratepayers | Edward Miles | 1,482 | | |
| Labour | Cled Phillips | 1,011 | | |
| Turnout | | | 59.2 | |
| Ratepayers win (new seat) | | | | |

=== Morriston (two seats) ===
Morriston 1973
| Party | Candidate | Votes | % | ±% |
|---|---|---|---|---|
| Labour | P. Evans | 1,996 | | |
| Labour | S. Havard | 1,977 | | |
| Ratepayers | C. Hadley | 1,810 | | |
| Ratepayers | J. Howes | 1,295 | | |
| Turnout | | | 35.8 | |
| Labour win (new seat) | | | | |
| Labour win (new seat) | | | | |

=== Mumbles (two seats) ===
Mumbles 1973
| Party | Candidate | Votes | % | ±% |
|---|---|---|---|---|
| Conservative | A. Chilcot | 3,180 | | |
| Conservative | M. Jones | 3,072 | | |
| Labour | L. Neale | 1,757 | | |
| Turnout | | | 38.2 | |
| Conservative win (new seat) | | | | |
| Conservative win (new seat) | | | | |

=== Neath No.1, South and Briton Ferry (four seats) ===
Neath No.1, South and Briton Ferry 1973
| Party | Candidate | Votes | % | ±% |
|---|---|---|---|---|
| Labour | Bill Phillips^{o} | 4,159 | | |
| Labour | Fred Kingdom | 4,137 | | |
| Labour | Dillwyn David | 4,013 | | |
| Labour | Len Burton^{o} | 3,891 | | |
| Communist | Gordon Jenkins | 1,683 | | |
| Communist | Walter Ferriss | 1,378 | | |
| Communist | Bill Pritchard | 1,019 | | |
| Communist | E. Strangeword | 689 | | |
| Turnout | | | 48.3 | |
| Labour win (new seat) | | | | |
| Labour win (new seat) | | | | |
| Labour win (new seat) | | | | |
| Labour win (new seat) | | | | |

=== Neath No.2, North, Pontrhydyfen and Tonmawr (two seats) ===
Neath No.2, North, Pontrhydyfen and Tonmawr 1973
| Party | Candidate | Votes | % | ±% |
|---|---|---|---|---|
| Labour | Frank Cecil Evans | 2,669 | | |
| Labour | Lillian Jones | 2,261 | | |
| Independent | Jack Leitz^{o} | 1,541 | | |
| Independent | Gerald Hemming | 1,533 | | |
| Turnout | | | 53.7 | |
| Labour win (new seat) | | | | |
| Labour win (new seat) | | | | |

=== Neath Rural (six seats) ===
Neath Rural 1973
| Party | Candidate | Votes | % | ±% |
|---|---|---|---|---|
| Labour | Roy Jones | 2,905 | | |
| Independent | Martin Thomas^{o} | 2,534 | | |
| Labour | Norman Thomas | 2,385 | | |
| Labour | Tom Thomas | 2,131 | | |
| Plaid Cymru | Huw Evans | 1,919 | | |
| Plaid Cymru | O. Roberts | 1,629 | | |
| Labour | Wilfred Jones | 1,575 | | |
| Labour | Clifford G. Jones | 1,499 | | |
| Independent | T. Rees | 1,346 | | |
| Labour | Richard Davies | 1,300 | | |
| Independent | L. Adams | 1,191 | | |
| Communist | Glaslyn Morgan | 734 | | |
| Plaid Cymru | T. Evans | 346 | | |
| Turnout | | | 67.3 | |
| Labour win (new seat) | | | | |
| Independent win (new seat) | | | | |
| Labour win (new seat) | | | | |
| Labour win (new seat) | | | | |
| Plaid Cymru win (new seat) | | | | |
| Plaid Cymru win (new seat) | | | | |

=== Neath Rural No.5 (one seat) ===
Neath Rural No.5 1973
| Party | Candidate | Votes | % | ±% |
|---|---|---|---|---|
| Labour | David Hull^{o} | 1,470 | | |
| Independent | R. Rees | 1,277 | | |
| Plaid Cymru | G. Dawe | 273 | | |
| Turnout | | | 63.2 | |
| Labour win (new seat) | | | | |

=== Penderry (three seats) ===
Penderry 1973
| Party | Candidate | Votes | % | ±% |
|---|---|---|---|---|
| Labour | John Allison | 3,152 | | |
| Labour | T. Jones | 3,090 | | |
| Labour | G. Thomas | 3,032 | | |
| Plaid Cymru | D. Reynon | 972 | | |
| Communist | W. Jones | 584 | | |
| Communist | B. Lewis | 424 | | |
| Communist | H. Barrow | 280 | | |
| Turnout | | | 29.4 | |
| Labour win (new seat) | | | | |
| Labour win (new seat) | | | | |
| Labour win (new seat) | | | | |

=== Pontardawe No.1 (one seat) ===
Pontardawe No.1 1973
| Party | Candidate | Votes | % | ±% |
|---|---|---|---|---|
| Independent | J. Williams | 1,151 | 62.1 | |
| Labour | G. Williams | 703 | 37.9 | |
| Turnout | | | 56.1 | |
| Independent win (new seat) | | | | |

=== Pontardawe No.2 (two seats) ===
Pontardawe No.2 1973
| Party | Candidate | Votes | % | ±% |
|---|---|---|---|---|
| Labour | J. Maunder | 2,694 | | |
| Independent | M. Rees | 1,948 | | |
| Labour | C. Jones | 1,836 | | |
| Plaid Cymru | M. Mulcahy | 1,507 | | |
| Independent | R. Jones | 1,037 | | |
| Turnout | | | 78.9 | |
| Labour win (new seat) | | | | |
| Labour win (new seat) | | | | |

=== Pontardawe No.3 (three seats) ===
Pontardawe No.3 1973
| Party | Candidate | Votes | % | ±% |
|---|---|---|---|---|
| Labour | G. Lake | 4,702 | | |
| Labour | W. Rees | 4,615 | | |
| Labour | B. Richards | 4,464 | | |
| Plaid Cymru | R. Davies | 3,305 | | |
| Turnout | | | 65.4 | |
| Labour win (new seat) | | | | |
| Labour win (new seat) | | | | |
| Labour win (new seat) | | | | |

=== St Helens (two seats) ===
St Helens 1973
| Party | Candidate | Votes | % | ±% |
|---|---|---|---|---|
| Conservative | C. Dilley | 1,741 | | |
| Conservative | M. Hinds | 1,545 | | |
| Labour | D. Davies | 1,067 | | |
| Turnout | | | 49.1 | |
| Conservative win (new seat) | | | | |
| Conservative win (new seat) | | | | |

=== Sketty (two seats) ===
Sketty 1973
| Party | Candidate | Votes | % | ±% |
|---|---|---|---|---|
| Conservative | M. Vaughan | 5,270 | | |
| Conservative | S. Perry | 4,819 | | |
| Conservative | R. Massey-Shaw | 4,477 | | |
| Labour | J. Dalton | 2,372 | | |
| Turnout | | | 47.2 | |
| Conservative win (new seat) | | | | |
| Conservative win (new seat) | | | | |
| Conservative win (new seat) | | | | |

=== St Johns (two seats) ===
St Johns 1973
| Party | Candidate | Votes | % | ±% |
|---|---|---|---|---|
| Labour | A, Morris | Unopposed | | |
| Labour | H. Tabram | Unopposed | | |
| Labour win (new seat) | | | | |
| Labour win (new seat) | | | | |

=== St Thomas (two seats) ===
St Thamas 1973
| Party | Candidate | Votes | % | ±% |
|---|---|---|---|---|
| Labour | A. Hare | Unopposed | | |
| Labour | I. Morgan | Unopposed | | |
| Labour win (new seat) | | | | |
| Labour win (new seat) | | | | |

=== Townhill (two seats) ===
Townhill 1973
| Party | Candidate | Votes | % | ±% |
|---|---|---|---|---|
| Labour | T. Wignall | 1,848 | | |
| Labour | T. Evans | 1,748 | | |
| Conservative | C. McPherson | 429 | | |
| Turnout | | | 34.4 | |
| Labour win (new seat) | | | | |
| Labour win (new seat) | | | | |

=== Victoria (two seats) ===
Victoria 1973
| Party | Candidate | Votes | % | ±% |
|---|---|---|---|---|
| Ratepayers | D. Jenkins | 1,390 | | |
| Ratepayers | S. Jenkins | 1,132 | | |
| Labour | A. Taylor | 1,051 | | |
| Labour | R. Lloyd | 852 | | |
| Conservative | T. Morgan | 477 | | |
| Conservative | E. Burrington | 329 | | |
| Turnout | | | 57.5 | |
| Ratepayers win (new seat) | | | | |
| Ratepayers win (new seat) | | | | |
