= 1985 Essex County Council election =

Local government contest in the East of England

- 2 May 1985

All 98 seats to Essex County Council 49 seats needed for a majority

	First party	Second party
Party	Conservative	Labour
Last election	51 seats, 42.5%	32 seats, 34.1%
Seats before	50	31
Seats won	45	29
Seat change	▼6	▼3
Popular vote	176,004	131,068
Percentage	39.8%	29.6%
Swing	▼2.7%	▼4.5%
	Third party	Fourth party
Party	Alliance	Loughton Residents
Last election	13 seats, 19.7%	1 seats, 0.4%
Seats before	14	1
Seats won	23	1
Seat change	▲10	Steady
Popular vote	130,848	2,399
Percentage	29.2%	0.5%
Swing	▲8.1%	▲0.1%
- Results of the 1985 Essex County Council election.
Council control before election
Conservative
Council control after election
No overall control

The 1985 Essex County Council election took place on 2 May 1985 as part of the 1985 United Kingdom local elections. 98 councillors were elected from various electoral divisions, which returned either one or two county councillors each by first-past-the-post voting for a four-year term of office.

== Summary ==
=== Election result ===
1985 Essex County Council election
Party	Candidates	Seats	Gains	Losses	Net gain/loss	Seats %	Votes %	Votes	+/−
Conservative	97	45	2	8	▼6	45.9	39.8	176,004	–2.7
Labour	98	29	1	4	▼3	29.6	29.6	131,068	–4.5
Alliance	85	23	10	0	▲10	23.5	29.2	130,848	+8.1
Loughton Residents	2	1	0	0	Steady	1.0	0.5	2,399	+0.1
Independent	7	0	0	0	Steady	0.0	0.2	817	–0.9
Residents	1	0	0	1	▼1	0.0	0.2	816	–1.0
Ecology	4	0	0	0	Steady	0.0	0.1	321	–0.1
Communist	1	0	0	0	Steady	0.0	<0.1	69	N/A

== Results by local authority ==
=== Basildon ===
Basildon District Summary
Party	Seats	+/-	Votes	%	+/-
Labour	6	Steady	18,235	40.3	–2.6
Conservative	3	Steady	14,386	31.8	+1.2
Alliance	1	▲1	11,830	26.1	+10.3
Residents	0	▼1	816	1.8	–6.6
Total	10	Steady	45,267	38.0	–3.5

Division Results

Basildon Crouch
Party	Candidate	Votes	%	±%
Conservative	Tony Ball	1,643	45.6	+11.6
Alliance	Graham Palmer	1,146	31.8	+13.1
Labour	Martin Cregg	814	22.6	–1.6
Majority		497	13.8	
Turnout		3,603	36.0	
Conservative hold		Swing	▼0.8	

Basildon Fryerns
Party	Candidate	Votes	%	±%
Labour	William Archibald *	2,300	71.2	+2.8
Conservative	Gladys Penvere	487	15.1	–1.2
Alliance	John Smith	442	13.7	+0.5
Majority		1,813	56.1	
Turnout		3,229	30.4	
Labour hold		Swing	▲2.0	

Basildon Gloucester Park
Party	Candidate	Votes	%	±%
Labour	William Primmer	2,885	65.5	–2.1
Conservative	Ian Harbott	815	18.5	+3.5
Alliance	Mark Chambers	702	15.9	−1.5
Majority		2,070	47.0	
Turnout		4,402	35.5	
Labour hold		Swing	▼2.8	

Basildon Laindon
Party	Candidate	Votes	%	±%
Labour	Rachel Bolt *	2,081	49.5	+6.6
Alliance	Kevin Neil	1,296	30.9	–2.6
Conservative	Ernest Lane	823	19.6	–4.0
Majority		785	18.7	
Turnout		4,200	37.7	
Labour hold		Swing	▲4.6	

Basildon Pitsea
Party	Candidate	Votes	%	±%
Labour	Geoffrey Martin-Smith	3,007	63.9	+2.2
Conservative	Mark Jennings	1,113	23.6	–3.2
Alliance	Michael Maguire	589	12.5	+1.0
Majority		1,894	40.2	
Turnout		4,709	30.5	
Labour hold		Swing	▲2.7	

Basildon Vange
Party	Candidate	Votes	%	±%
Labour	George Miller*	2,898	68.1	+2.8
Conservative	Alan White	782	18.4	–1.1
Alliance	Michael Birch	575	13.5	+0.9
Majority		2,116	49.7	
Turnout		4,255	32.1	
Labour hold		Swing	▲2.0	

Basildon Westley Heights
Party	Candidate	Votes	%	±%
Labour	Rosemary Evans	2,061	41.9	–2.0
Conservative	Elizabeth Dines	1,440	29.3	–4.3
Alliance	Joseph White	1,417	28.8	+6.4
Majority		621	12.6	
Turnout		4,918	44.5	
Labour hold		Swing	▲1.2	

Billericay North
Party	Candidate	Votes	%	±%
Conservative	Lilian Greenfield *	3,310	65.9	+12.8
Alliance	Alan Banton	1,261	25.1	N/A
Labour	Irene Harlow	450	9.0	+1.2
Majority		2,049	40.8	
Turnout		5,021	42.4	
Conservative hold		Swing	▼6.2	

Billericay South
Party	Candidate	Votes	%	±%
Conservative	Ronald Marshall	2,498	42.9	+10.1
Alliance	Grahame Cronkshaw	1,595	27.4	+12.0
Labour	John Kemp	919	15.8	−1.2
Residents	Horace Wilkins*	816	14.0	−20.9
Majority		903	15.5	
Turnout		5,828	46.2	
Conservative gain from Residents		Swing	▼1.0	

Wickford
Party	Candidate	Votes	%	±%
Alliance	Raymond Auvray	2,807	55.0	+36.5
Conservative	Eileen Mickleborough*	1,475	28.9	–22.0
Labour	Christopher Wilson	820	16.1	–14.5
Majority		1,332	26.1	
Turnout		5,102	47.6	
Alliance gain from Conservative		Swing	▲29.3	

=== Braintree ===
Braintree District Summary
Party	Seats	+/-	Votes	%	+/-
Conservative	4	▼1	14,923	40.8	–4.3
Labour	2	▲1	11,376	31.1	–6.5
Alliance	1	Steady	10,273	28.1	+10.8
Total	7	Steady	36,572	42.4	–1.0

Division results

Bocking
Party	Candidate	Votes	%	±%
Labour	Peter White	2,548	43.2	+4.8
Conservative	Angela Comfort	2,373	40.2	+1.2
Alliance	Hugh Nicholson	979	16.6	–6.0
Majority		175	3.0	
Turnout		5,900	49.5	
Labour gain from Conservative		Swing	▲1.8	

Braintree East
Party	Candidate	Votes	%	±%
Conservative	Robert Dixon-Smith *	2,315	42.9	+3.6
Labour	Robert Pay	1,677	31.1	–1.1
Alliance	Christopher Papworth	1,407	26.1	–2.4
Majority		638	11.8	
Turnout		5,399	42.5	
Conservative hold		Swing	▲2.4	

Braintree West
Party	Candidate	Votes	%	±%
Alliance	David Grice *	2,913	50.4	+12.8
Conservative	John Render	1,936	33.5	–3.3
Labour	Sylvia Kerlogue	931	16.1	–9.5
Majority		977	16.9	
Turnout		5,780	44.1	
Alliance hold		Swing	▲8.1	

Halstead
Party	Candidate	Votes	%	±%
Conservative	Olive Joyce*	2,522	46.8	–11.0
Labour	Robert Dixey	1,767	32.8	–9.4
Alliance	Anthony Bird	1,095	20.3	N/A
Majority		755	14.0	
Turnout		5,384	42.5	
Conservative hold		Swing	▼0.8	

Hedingham
Party	Candidate	Votes	%	±%
Conservative	Geoffrey Waterer*	2,531	50.9	–13.9
Alliance	Honor Chamberlain	1,425	28.6	N/A
Labour	Alan Sturges	1,018	20.5	–14.7
Majority		1,106	22.2	
Turnout		4,974	43.5	
Conservative hold		Swing	▼21.3	

Witham Northern
Party	Candidate	Votes	%	±%
Labour	Joan Lyon	2,037	42.7	−1.4
Conservative	Patricia Gilthorpe	1,481	31.1	−2.3
Alliance	John Faulkner	1,251	26.2	+3.7
Majority		556	11.7	
Turnout		4,769	37.6	
Labour hold		Swing	▲0.5	

Witham Southern
Party	Candidate	Votes	%	±%
Conservative	Dennis Willetts *	1,765	40.4	–10.7
Labour	Kathryn Blower	1,398	32.0	–16.9
Alliance	Donald Howard	1,203	27.6	N/A
Majority		367	8.4	
Turnout		4,366	37.1	
Conservative hold		Swing	▲3.1	

=== Brentwood ===
Brentwood District Summary
Party	Seats	+/-	Votes	%	+/-
Conservative	4	▼1	11,520	46.0	–5.8
Alliance	1	▲1	8,807	35.2	+11.6
Labour	0	Steady	4,717	18.8	–5.8
Total	5	Steady	25,044	44.8	–1.0

Division results

Brentwood Central
Party	Candidate	Votes	%	±%
Conservative	Margaret Hutton*	2,151	44.8	–3.4
Alliance	Eunice Yates	1,989	41.4	+11.8
Labour	Gordon Dimmock	659	13.7	–8.5
Majority		162	4.4	–15.2
Turnout		4,799	47.4	+1.7
Registered electors		10,133		
Conservative hold		Swing	▼7.6	

Brentwood Hutton
Party	Candidate	Votes	%	±%
Conservative	Anthony Donnelly *	2,368	51.3	−5.5
Alliance	Terence Brown	1,497	32.4	+8.1
Labour	Charles Cozens	750	16.3	–2.6
Majority		871	18.9	
Turnout		4,615	38.4	
Conservative hold		Swing	▼6.8	

Brentwood North
Party	Candidate	Votes	%	±%
Conservative	Leonard Jago *	1,997	50.6	–1.7
Alliance	Rona Gottesmann	1,311	33.2	+10.0
Labour	Lily Southgate	635	16.1	–8.4
Majority		686	17.4	
Turnout		3,943	41.1	
Conservative hold		Swing	▼5.9	

Brentwood Rural
Party	Candidate	Votes	%	±%
Alliance	Drek Hardy	2,790	45.2	+16.1
Conservative	Rita Brown	2,759	44.7	–12.5
Labour	Richard Tattersall	620	10.1	–3.6
Majority		31	0.5	
Turnout		6,169	48.7	
Alliance gain from Conservative		Swing	▲14.3	

Brentwood South
Party	Candidate	Votes	%	±%
Conservative	Janet Hayward *	2,407	42.4	–2.3
Labour	Cornelius Maxey	2,053	36.1	–5.7
Alliance	Robert McFarland	1,220	21.5	+8.0
Majority		354	6.2	
Turnout		5,680	49.2	
Conservative hold		Swing	▲1.7	

=== Castle Point ===
Castle Point District Summary
Party	Seats	+/-	Votes	%	+/-
Conservative	4	▲1	11,398	50.1	+3.3
Labour	1	▼1	7,216	31.7	–1.2
Alliance	0	Steady	4,157	18.3	–1.9 (Note: Change from the combined vote share of the Liberal Party and SDP from the 1981 election)
Total	6	Steady	22,771	34.3	–5.1

Division results

Benfleet
Party	Candidate	Votes	%	±%
Conservative	Jillian Reeves	2,144	55.9	+2.8
Labour	Brian Wilson	913	23.8	–0.6
Alliance	Timothy Atkin	777	20.3	–2.1
Majority		1,231	32.1	
Turnout		3,834	38.4	
Conservative hold		Swing	▲1.7	

Canvey Island East
Party	Candidate	Votes	%	±%
Labour	Dennis Nisbet*	1,704	40.8	+0.3
Conservative	Arthur Patterson	1,694	40.5	+1.7
Alliance	Frederick Johnstone	780	18.7	N/A
Majority		10	0.2	
Turnout		4,178	30.0	
Labour hold		Swing	▼0.7	

Canvey Island West
Party	Candidate	Votes	%	±%
Conservative	Raymond Howard	1,961	45.3	+14.6
Labour	Dorothy Shaw*	1,845	42.6	–4.8
Alliance	Kenneth Miller	520	12.0	+2.6
Majority		116	2.7	
Turnout		4,326	33.7	
Conservative gain from Labour		Swing	▲9.7	

Great Tarpots
Party	Candidate	Votes	%	±%
Conservative	William Brum *	1,507	43.9	+0.1
Labour	Anthony Wright	1,293	37.7	−0.8
Alliance	Alwyn Birch	634	18.5	+0.9
Majority		214	6.2	
Turnout		3,434	32.1	
Conservative hold		Swing	▲0.5	

Hadleigh
Party	Candidate	Votes	%	±%
Conservative	Ronald Williams *	2,365	63.8	+2.0
Alliance	David Newton	723	19.5	–0.9
Labour	Graham Carr	620	16.7	–1.2
Majority		1,642	44.3	
Turnout		3,708	40.7	
Conservative hold		Swing	▲1.5	

Thundersley
Party	Candidate	Votes	%	±%
Conservative	Joseph Gazzard	1,727	52.5	–1.3
Labour	John Payne	841	25.6	–2.6
Alliance	Robin Michel	723	22.0	+4.0
Majority		886	26.9	
Turnout		3,291	33.7	
Conservative hold		Swing	▲0.7	

=== Chelmsford ===
Chelmsford District Summary
Party	Seats	+/-	Votes	%	+/-
Alliance	5	Steady	19,957	43.6	+0.7
Conservative	4	Steady	18,749	41.0	–0.1
Labour	0	Steady	7,037	15.4	–0.6
Total	9	Steady	45,743	40.9	–4.9

Division results

Broomfield & Writtle
Party	Candidate	Votes	%	±%
Conservative	Michael Rose	2,353	52.7	+1.1
Alliance	Betty Perry	1,224	27.4	+0.5
Labour	Stephen Morphew	892	20.0	–1.6
Majority		1,129	25.3	
Turnout		4,469	40.2	
Conservative hold		Swing	▲0.3	

Chelmsford East
Party	Candidate	Votes	%	±%
Alliance	Aleck Knight *	2,527	44.6	–9.1
Conservative	David Kimberlin	2,346	41.4	+6.9
Labour	Clive Playford	792	14.0	+2.2
Majority		181	3.2	
Turnout		5,665	44.4	
Alliance hold		Swing	▼8.0	

Chelmsford North
Party	Candidate	Votes	%	±%
Alliance	Thomas Smith-Hughes *	2,235	50.0	−6.4
Conservative	Anne Lewis	1,189	26.6	+0.5
Labour	Roy Chad	1,048	23.4	+5.9
Majority		1,046	23.4	
Turnout		4,472	42.5	
Alliance hold		Swing	▼3.5	

Chelmsford South
Party	Candidate	Votes	%	±%
Alliance	Robert Harmer *	2,755	51.6	+6.0
Conservative	Colin South	1,945	36.5	–2.7
Labour	Karen Brownfield	634	11.9	–3.3
Majority		810	15.2	
Turnout		5,334	46.9	
Alliance hold		Swing	▲4.4	

Chelmsford West
Party	Candidate	Votes	%	±%
Alliance	George Allen	1,962	45.5	−5.0
Conservative	Richard Unwin	1,230	28.5	+0.8
Labour	William Wright	1,123	26.0	+4.2
Majority		732	17.0	
Turnout		4,315	43.2	
Alliance hold		Swing	▼2.9	

Great Baddow
Party	Candidate	Votes	%	±%
Alliance	Joan Beard *	2,713	55.3	+5.9
Conservative	Leslie King	1,678	34.2	−3.0
Labour	Susan Brisbane	517	10.5	−2.1
Majority		1,035	21.1	
Turnout		4,908	45.9	
Alliance hold		Swing	▲4.5	

Springfield
Party	Candidate	Votes	%	±%
Conservative	Christopher Gore *	2,780	47.0	+0.7
Alliance	Wilfred Davey	2,579	43.6	+5.0
Labour	Richard Hussey	553	9.4	−5.7
Majority		201	3.4	
Turnout		5,912	38.2	
Conservative hold		Swing	▼2.2	

Stock
Party	Candidate	Votes	%	±%
Conservative	Paul White*	2,668	50.9	–2.6
Alliance	Jean Wyatt	1,663	31.7	+2.7
Labour	Jane Sargent	908	17.3	–0.2
Majority		1,005	19.2	
Turnout		5,239	35.9	
Conservative hold		Swing	▼2.7	

Woodham Ferrers & Danbury
Party	Candidate	Votes	%	±%
Conservative	David Chatfield *	2,560	47.2	−5.5
Alliance	Robert Richards	2,299	42.3	+5.1
Labour	David Long	570	10.5	+0.3
Majority		261	4.8	
Turnout		5,429	35.5	
Conservative hold		Swing	▲5.3	

=== Colchester ===
District Summary
Party	Seats	+/-	Votes	%	+/-
Conservative	5	Steady	16,855	39.8	–10.0
Alliance	3	▲3	14,369	33.9	+27.1
Labour	1	▼3	11,121	26.3	–15.7
Total	9	Steady	42,345	38.3	–0.8

Division results

Constable
Party	Candidate	Votes	%	±%
Conservative	Anthony Clover	2,711	59.5	−10.7
Alliance	Michael Cook	1,154	25.3	N/A
Labour	Jennifer Church	693	15.2	–14.6
Majority		1,557	34.2	
Turnout		4,558	43.4	
Conservative hold		Swing		

Drury
Party	Candidate	Votes	%	±%
Conservative	Derek Lamberth	2,706	45.1	–5.9
Alliance	Westley Sandford	2,546	42.4	+12.7
Labour	Jane Beer	748	12.5	–6.8
Majority		160	2.7	
Turnout		6,000	46.2	
Conservative hold		Swing		

Maypole
Party	Candidate	Votes	%	±%
Alliance	Mark Campbell	1,936	43.4	+21.3
Labour	Gillian Bober	1,765	39.6	–13.2
Conservative	Michael Last	755	16.9	–8.1
Majority		171	3.8	
Turnout		4,456	36.7	
Alliance gain from Labour		Swing		

Mersea and Stanway
Party	Candidate	Votes	%	±%
Conservative	Richard Fairhead	3,076	59.6	–11.4
Alliance	David Goss	1,244	24.1	N/A
Labour	Andrew Fieldsend	838	16.2	–6.4
Majority		1,832	35.5	
Turnout		5,158	39.4	
Conservative hold		Swing		

No Ecology candidate as previous (–6.4).

Old Heath
Party	Candidate	Votes	%	±%
Alliance	Ann Stevens	2,398	44.9	N/A
Labour	Douglas Williams	1,900	35.5	–25.2
Conservative	Patricia Bowdidge	1,047	19.6	–13.8
Majority		498	9.4	
Turnout		5345	45.9	
Alliance gain from Labour		Swing		

No Ecology candidate as previous (–6.0).

Park
Party	Candidate	Votes	%	±%
Conservative	Edna Gawthrop	1,814	39.7	–11.7
Alliance	Christopher Hall	1,523	33.4	N/A
Labour	Martin Smith	1,227	26.9	–21.7
Majority		291	6.3	
Turnout		4,564	44.7	
Conservative hold		Swing		

Parsons Heath
Party	Candidate	Votes	%	±%
Alliance	Alan Hayman	1,679	35.7	N/A
Conservative	Michael Roots	1,541	32.8	–15.0
Labour	Sydney Kent	1,485	31.6	–20.6
Majority		138	2.9	
Turnout		4705	41.8	
Alliance gain from Labour		Swing		

Tiptree
Party	Candidate	Votes	%	±%
Conservative	Peter Innes	1,880	49.3	–11.4
Alliance	Andrew Hatton	1,244	32.6	N/A
Labour	Stevan Slodzik	693	18.2	–21.1
Majority		636	16.7	
Turnout		3,817	33.4	
Conservative hold		Swing		

Wivenhoe St Andrew
Party	Candidate	Votes	%	±%
Labour	Brian Stapleton	1,772	47.4	–15.9
Conservative	Roger Lord	1,325	35.4	–1.4
Alliance	Yvonne Holley	645	17.2	N/A
Majority		447	11.9	
Turnout		3,742	30.8	
Labour hold		Swing		

=== Epping Forest ===
Epping Forest District Summary
Party	Seats	+/-	Votes	%	+/-
Conservative	5	Steady	15,017	44.0	–7.1
Labour	2	Steady	9,425	27.6	–4.4
Loughton Residents	1	Steady	2,399	7.0	+2.5
Alliance	0	Steady	7,039	20.6	+8.6
Independent	0	Steady	212	0.6	N/A
Total	8	Steady	34,092	37.3	–5.7

Division results

Buckhurst Hill
Party	Candidate	Votes	%	±%
Conservative	Bernard Cox *	1,780	44.9	–13.1
Alliance	Ronald Eveling	1,496	37.7	+18.1
Labour	Lynn Baddock	687	17.3	–5.1
Majority		284	7.2	
Turnout		3,963	36.7	
Conservative hold		Swing	▼15.6	

Chigwell
Party	Candidate	Votes	%	±%
Conservative	Moran Fransworth	1,641	48.3	–21.4
Alliance	Geoffrey Hallett	1,486	43.7	+28.2
Labour	Bernard Mooney	272	8.0	–6.8
Majority		155	4.6	
Turnout		3,399	34.4	
Conservative hold		Swing	▼24.8	

Epping
Party	Candidate	Votes	%	±%
Conservative	Robert Daniels*	2,257	47.8	–6.0
Alliance	Samuel Ormsby	1,317	27.9	+12.1
Labour	Peter Speake	1,144	24.2	–3.2
Majority		940	19.9	
Turnout		4,718	38.5	
Conservative hold		Swing	▼9.1	

Loughton St. Johns
Party	Candidate	Votes	%	±%
Labour	Frank Davis *	1,473	40.9	–6.5
Conservative	Donald Brady	1,034	28.7	–13.0
Loughton Residents	Leslie Brown	841	23.3	N/A
Alliance	Gillian Pettman	254	7.1	–3.8
Majority		439	12.2	
Turnout		3,602	36.4	
Labour hold		Swing	▲3.3	

Loughton St. Marys
Party	Candidate	Votes	%	±%
Loughton Residents	Sidney Webb	1,558	38.7	+3.9
Labour	Joan Davis	1,314	32.6	+5.7
Conservative	Edwin Markham	1,155	28.7	–3.8
Majority		244	6.1	
Turnout		4,027	37.6	
Loughton Residents hold		Swing	▼0.9	

North Weald & Nazeing
Party	Candidate	Votes	%	±%
Conservative	Ian Abbey	2,243	57.8	–4.0
Alliance	John Carter	826	21.3	+8.4
Labour	Ian Bell	647	16.7	–8.6
Independent	Reginald Wyness	167	4.3	N/A
Majority		1,417	36.5	
Turnout		3,883	37.1	
Conservative hold		Swing	▼6.2	

Ongar
Party	Candidate	Votes	%	±%
Conservative	Joan Martin *	2,630	48.8	–5.9
Alliance	Derek Jacobs	1,660	30.8	+12.5
Labour	Duncan Sturrock	1,049	19.5	–7.5
Independent	Walter Clanford	45	0.8	N/A
Majority		970	18.0	
Turnout		5,384	41.0	
Conservative hold		Swing	▼9.2	

Waltham Abbey
Party	Candidate	Votes	%	±%
Labour	Cyril Hewins*	2,839	55.5	–1.2
Conservative	John O'Reily	2,277	44.5	+1.2
Majority		562	11.0	
Turnout		5,116	36.1	
Labour hold		Swing	▼1.2	

=== Harlow ===
Harlow District Summary
Party	Seats	+/-	Votes	%	+/-
Labour	5	Steady	13,343	59.0	+0.5
Alliance	0	Steady	5,158	22.8	+3.7
Conservative	0	Steady	4,110	18.2	–2.6
Total	5	Steady	22,611	38.2	–3.8

Division Results

Great Parndon
Party	Candidate	Votes	%	±%
Labour	Sidney Warner*	2,385	50.3	–3.4
Conservative	Leslie Atkins	1,526	32.2	+7.3
Alliance	Stephen James	834	17.6	+4.5
Majority		859	18.1	
Turnout		4,745	37.7	
Labour hold		Swing	▲5.4	

Harlow & Mark Hall
Party	Candidate	Votes	%	±%
Labour	Sonia Anderson*	2,698	57.3	+4.3
Conservative	Frank Stapleton	1,164	24.7	–3.3
Alliance	Frances Clark	844	17.9	–1.1
Majority		1,534	32.6	
Turnout		4,706	42.8	
Labour hold		Swing	▲3.8	

Harlow Common
Party	Candidate	Votes	%	±%
Labour	William Gibson*	2,438	53.5	–5.2
Alliance	Albert Lee	2,123	46.5	+22.7
Majority		315	6.9	
Turnout		4,561	39.4	
Labour hold		Swing	▼14.0	

Little Parndon & Town Centre
Party	Candidate	Votes	%	±%
Labour	Edith Morris*	2,650	65.4	+5.1
Conservative	Stephen Rigden	704	17.4	–1.2
Alliance	Janet Fautley	700	17.3	–3.8
Majority		1,946	48.0	
Turnout		4,054	35.6	
Labour hold		Swing	▲3.2	

Netteswellbury
Party	Candidate	Votes	%	±%
Labour	Robert Guy	3,172	69.8	+3.8
Conservative	Melanie Nash	716	15.8	+0.3
Alliance	Elsa Scammell	657	14.5	−4.0
Majority		2,456	54.0	
Turnout		4,545	35.8	
Labour hold		Swing	▲1.8	

=== Maldon ===
Maldon District Summary
Party	Seats	+/-	Votes	%	+/-
Conservative	2	▼1	7,239	46.6	+2.6
Alliance	1	▲1	5,692	36.7	+0.1
Labour	0	Steady	2,590	16.7	–2.6
Total	3	Steady	15,521	40.9	–4.6

Division results

Maldon
Party	Candidate	Votes	%	±%
Conservative	Kathleen Nolan*	2,415	47.3	+5.3
Alliance	Esther Eborall	1,541	30.2	–1.4
Labour	Peter Hedge	1,145	22.4	–4.0
Majority		874	17.1	
Turnout		5,101	42.6	
Conservative hold		Swing	▲3.4	

Southminster
Party	Candidate	Votes	%	±%
Conservative	David Fisher*	2,304	50.2	+6.7
Alliance	Margaret Black	1,530	33.4	–3.2
Labour	Norman Hunt	752	16.4	–3.5
Majority		774	16.9	
Turnout		4,586	34.7	
Conservative hold		Swing	▲5.0	

Tollesbury
Party	Candidate	Votes	%	±%
Alliance	John Loxley	2,621	44.9	+3.7
Conservative	Edmund Peel	2,520	43.2	–3.2
Labour	Stephan Jennings	693	11.9	–0.4
Majority		101	1.7	
Turnout		5,834	45.8	
Alliance gain from Conservative		Swing	▲3.5	

=== Rochford ===
Rochford District Summary
Party	Seats	+/-	Votes	%	+/-
Conservative	2	▼1	8,980	42.5	–9.3
Alliance	2	▲1	5,645	26.7	+14.2
Labour	1	Steady	5,811	27.5	–3.9
Total	5	Steady	21,134	36.6	–1.7

Division results

Rayleigh North
Party	Candidate	Votes	%	±%
Alliance	Richard Boyd *	2,444	57.1	+13.2
Conservative	Tony Guinness	1,388	32.5	−9.1
Labour	James Foley	445	10.4	−4.1
Majority		1,056	24.7	
Turnout		4,277	39.5	
Alliance hold		Swing	▲11.2	

Rayleigh South
Party	Candidate	Votes	%	±%
Alliance	James Gordon	1,670	36.9	+24.3
Conservative	Trevor Murray *	1,263	27.9	–13.9
Labour	Richard McCarnley	899	19.8	–5.1
Independent	Stanley Silva	698	15.4	–5.3
Majority		407	9.0	
Turnout		4,530	38.4	
Alliance gain from Conservative		Swing	▲19.1	

Rochford North
Party	Candidate	Votes	%	±%
Conservative	Terry Fawell	1,737	42.8	–20.9
Alliance	James Nokes	1,531	37.7	N/A
Labour	Raymond Stephenson	789	19.4	–16.9
Majority		206	5.1	
Turnout		4,057	34.4	
Conservative hold		Swing	▼29.3	

Rochford South
Party	Candidate	Votes	%	±%
Labour	David Weir*	2,133	50.0	–0.3
Conservative	John Sheaf	2,132	50.0	+0.3
Majority		1	0.0	
Turnout		4,265	39.7	
Labour hold		Swing	▼0.3	

Rochford West
Party	Candidate	Votes	%	±%
Conservative	Josephine Jones *	2,460	61.4	–4.6
Labour	Christopher Morgan	1,545	38.6	+4.6
Majority		915	22.8	
Turnout		4,005	31.9	
Conservative hold		Swing	▼4.6	

=== Southend ===
Southend District Summary
Party	Seats	+/-	Votes	%	+/-
Alliance	7	▲3	20,032	41.6	+11.5
Conservative	3	▼3	18,847	39.1	–4.8
Labour	1	Steady	8,644	17.9	–5.2
Ecology	0	Steady	321	0.7	N/A
Independent	0	Steady	319	0.7	–1.2
Total	11	Steady	48,164	38.0	–2.5

Division results

Belfairs & Blenheim
Party	Candidate	Votes	%	±%
Alliance	William Cleary	2,647	53.3	+22.7
Conservative	Terrrence Birdseye	1,787	36.0	–17.3
Labour	Nigel Boorman	487	9.8	–6.2
Ecology	David Carr	48	1.0	N/A
Majority		860	17.3	
Turnout		4,969	45.2	
Alliance gain from Conservative		Swing	▲20.0	

Chalkwell
Party	Candidate	Votes	%	±%
Alliance	Allan Petchey	2,280	47.9	+7.4
Conservative	Geoffrey Baum	2,148	45.1	–5.5
Labour	Andrew Rothwell	331	7.0	–1.8
Majority		132	2.8	
Turnout		4,759	42.6	
Alliance gain from Conservative		Swing	▲6.5	

Eastwood
Party	Candidate	Votes	%	±%
Alliance	Nora Goodman *	2,183	52.5	+6.5
Conservative	Robin Carlile	1,648	39.6	−3.1
Labour	Leslie Shaw	327	7.9	–3.3
Majority		535	12.9	
Turnout		4,158	38.3	
Alliance hold		Swing	▲4.8	

Leigh
Party	Candidate	Votes	%	±%
Alliance	Margery Robinson	2,486	50.5	+1.3
Conservative	James Gibb	2,006	40.7	–4.5
Labour	Lily Davidson	339	6.9	+1.9
Ecology	David Cotgrove	95	1.9	N/A
Majority		480	9.7	
Turnout		4,926	44.3	
Alliance hold		Swing	▲2.9	

Milton
Party	Candidate	Votes	%	±%
Alliance	Colin George	1,860	40.0	N/A
Conservative	Dennis Wilson *	1,392	29.9	–9.8
Labour	Katherine Kirk	1,294	27.8	−5.0
Ecology	Clement Smith	103	2.2	N/A
Majority		468	10.1	
Turnout		4,649	38.2	
Alliance gain from Conservative		Swing	▲24.9	

Prittlewell
Party	Candidate	Votes	%	±%
Alliance	Jean Sargent *	2,770	59.5	+12.7
Conservative	Rita Bosch	1,232	26.5	−8.6
Labour	Albert Dunn	654	14.0	−4.1
Majority		1,538	33.0	
Turnout		4,656	38.3	
Alliance hold		Swing	▲10.7	

Shoebury
Party	Candidate	Votes	%	±%
Conservative	David Cotgrove *	1,924	48.9	+3.0
Labour	Christopher Dandridge	1,068	27.1	–9.8
Alliance	Howard Gibeon	625	15.9	+0.4
Independent	Ronald Levy	319	8.1	N/A
Majority		856	21.7	
Turnout		3,936	32.3	
Conservative hold		Swing	▲6.4	

Southchurch
Party	Candidate	Votes	%	±%
Conservative	Brian Kelly	1,864	46.1	–0.1
Alliance	Robert Hendry	1,322	32.7	+12.3
Labour	Robert Brown	858	21.2	–12.2
Majority		542	13.4	
Turnout		4,044	35.1	
Conservative hold		Swing	▼6.2	

Thorpe
Party	Candidate	Votes	%	±%
Conservative	Bettine Pledge	2,135	58.2	–2.7
Alliance	Vernon Cooper	789	21.5	+9.5
Labour	Peter Ottino	670	18.3	–5.1
Ecology	Joan Shillingford	75	2.0	N/A
Majority		1,346	36.7	
Turnout		3,669	32.1	
Conservative hold		Swing	▼6.1	

Victoria
Party	Candidate	Votes	%	±%
Labour	Ronald Kenndey *	1,767	50.7	±0.0
Conservative	Kenneth Goldsmith	955	27.4	–0.1
Alliance	Joan Overy	761	21.8	±0.0
Majority		812	23.3	
Turnout		3,483	30.8	
Labour hold		Swing	0.0	

Westborough
Party	Candidate	Votes	%	±%
Alliance	Mary Lubel *	2,310	47.0	+7.6
Conservative	Margaret Haine	1,756	35.7	–2.8
Labour	Angela Smith	849	17.3	–4.8
Majority		554	11.3	
Turnout		4,915	42.1	
Alliance hold		Swing	▲5.2	

=== Tendring ===
Tendring District Summary
Party	Seats	+/-	Votes	%	+/-
Conservative	4	Steady	15,674	41.5	–2.6
Alliance	2	Steady	11,472	30.4	+5.3
Labour	2	Steady	10,483	27.7	–1.1
Independent	0	Steady	168	0.4	–0.9
Total	8	Steady	37,797	39.7	+2.4

Division result

Brightlingsea
Party	Candidate	Votes	%	±%
Alliance	Thomas Dale*	2,557	49.7	–1.7
Conservative	Steven Ellis	1,851	36.0	+4.4
Labour	Norma Gallagher	735	14.3	+0.4
Majority		706	13.7	
Turnout		5,143	44.8	
Alliance hold		Swing	▼3.1	

Clacton East
Party	Candidate	Votes	%	±%
Conservative	John Story*	2,341	51.0	−4.5
Alliance	Anne Laird	1,492	32.5	+3.7
Labour	Frank Baker	761	16.6	+0.8
Majority		849	18.5	
Turnout		4,594	37.2	
Conservative hold		Swing	▼4.1	

Clacton North
Party	Candidate	Votes	%	±%
Alliance	Geoffrey Waterfield *	2,644	55.5	+16.8
Conservative	Anthony Newell	1,293	27.1	–3.9
Labour	Reginald Sims	830	17.4	–9.8
Majority		1,351	28.3	
Turnout		4,767	38.0	
Alliance hold		Swing	▲10.4	

Clacton West
Party	Candidate	Votes	%	±%
Labour	Roy Smith *	2,221	46.7	+5.7
Conservative	Catherine Jessop	1,573	33.1	−3.2
Alliance	Michael Bargent	915	19.2	−3.4
Independent	C. Ha-Ha Woof-Woof	46	1.0	N/A
Majority		648	13.6	
Turnout		4,755	37.4	
Labour hold		Swing	▲4.5	

Frinton & Walton
Party	Candidate	Votes	%	±%
Conservative	David Rex*	2,971	58.1	–2.3
Alliance	Robert Hamilton	1,478	28.9	+6.7
Labour	Paul Johnson	664	13.0	–4.4
Majority		1,493	29.2	
Turnout		5,113	37.5	
Conservative hold		Swing	▼4.5	

Harwich
Party	Candidate	Votes	%	±%
Labour	Ralph Knight*	2,842	59.1	+13.8
Conservative	Frederick Good	1,967	40.9	+0.5
Majority		875	18.2	
Turnout		4,809	41.1	
Labour hold		Swing	▲6.7	

Tendring Rural East
Party	Candidate	Votes	%	±%
Conservative	Charles Lumber*	1,662	41.8	–18.0
Labour	Peter Davis	1,286	32.4	–7.8
Alliance	William Ford	1,025	25.8	N/A
Majority		376	9.5	
Turnout		3,973	39.5	
Conservative hold		Swing	▼5.1	

Tendring Rural West
Party	Candidate	Votes	%	±%
Conservative	Douglas Pallett	2,016	43.4	+4.3
Alliance	Stephen Hammerton	1,361	29.3	+8.1
Labour	Kay Bayles	1,144	24.6	–8.9
Independent	Sidney Rhodes	122	2.6	–0.5
Majority		655	14.1	
Turnout		4,643	43.3	
Conservative hold		Swing	▼1.9	

=== Thurrock ===
District Summary
Party	Seats	+/-	Votes	%	+/-
Labour	8	Steady	16,814	66.8	+3.3
Conservative	0	Steady	8,274	32.9	+2.3
Communist	0	Steady	69	0.3	N/A
Total	8	Steady	25,157	26.7	–8.6

Division results

Chadwell
Party	Candidate	Votes	%	±%
Labour	Charles Bidmead	2,061	71.2	–4.6
Conservative	Grahame Law	833	28.8	+4.6
Majority		1,228	42.4	
Turnout		2,894	23.6	
Labour hold		Swing	▼4.6	

Corringham
Party	Candidate	Votes	%	±%
Labour	Robert Goldsmith	1,893	66.1	+4.9
Conservative	William Lea	971	33.9	–4.9
Majority		922	32.2	
Turnout		2,864	26.5	
Labour hold		Swing	▲4.9	

Grays Thurrock
Party	Candidate	Votes	%	±%
Labour	Martin Cohen *	2,296	55.2	+10.1
Conservative	Joan Greatrex	1,865	44.8	+3.2
Majority		431	10.4	
Turnout		4,161	31.8	
Labour hold		Swing	▲3.5	

Orsett & Stifford
Party	Candidate	Votes	%	±%
Labour	John Pollard *	2,294	56.6	+3.8
Conservative	Harold Lott	1,762	43.4	–3.8
Majority		532	13.1	
Turnout		4,056	35.5	
Labour hold		Swing	▲3.8	

South Ockendon
Party	Candidate	Votes	%	±%
Labour	George Miles*	2,404	81.3	+1.1
Conservative	Frederick Beasley	553	18.7	–1.0
Majority		1,851	62.6	
Turnout		2,957	25.8	
Labour hold		Swing	▲1.1	

Stanford-le-Hope
Party	Candidate	Votes	%	±%
Labour	Julian Norris*	2,100	63.9	+1.0
Conservative	Lee Green	1,184	36.1	–1.0
Majority		916	27.9	
Turnout		3,284	26.3	
Labour hold		Swing	▲1.0	

Tilbury
Party	Candidate	Votes	%	±%
Labour	Patrick Bolger*	1,908	82.1	–2.7
Conservative	William McLaughlin	348	15.0	–0.2
Communist	Joseph Paul	69	3.0	N/A
Majority		1,560	67.1	
Turnout		2,325	20.4	
Labour hold		Swing	▼1.3	

West Thurrock & Aveley
Party	Candidate	Votes	%	±%
Labour	Ann Geaney	1,858	71.0	+15.5
Conservative	Edward Attewell	758	29.0	+13.3
Majority		1,100	42.0	
Turnout		2,616	23.6	
Labour hold		Swing	▲2.2	

=== Uttlesford ===
Uttlesford District Summary
Party	Seats	+/-	Votes	%	+/-
Conservative	4	Steady	10,032	48.2	–1.9
Alliance	0	Steady	6,417	30.8	+17.8
Labour	0	Steady	4,256	20.4	–5.0
Independent	0	Steady	118	0.6	–11.0
Total	4	Steady	20,823	42.4	–5.1

Division results

Dunmow
Party	Candidate	Votes	%	±%
Conservative	Michael Stephen	2,393	52.3	–0.3
Alliance	Graham Tobbell	1,450	32.0	+3.7
Labour	William McCarthy	682	15.1	–3.4
Majority		943	20.8	–4.0
Turnout		4,525	40.8	–8.3
Registered electors		11,097		
Conservative hold		Swing	▼2.0	

Saffron Walden
Party	Candidate	Votes	%	±%
Conservative	Stephen Neville	2,685	41.6	–3.4
Labour	Russell Green	2,199	34.1	−0.2
Alliance	Stephen Jones	1,574	24.4	+3.7
Majority		486	7.5	
Turnout		6,458	46.9	
Conservative hold		Swing	▼1.6	

Stansted
Party	Candidate	Votes	%	±%
Conservative	Patricia Wawn *	2,432	49.2	–0.8
Alliance	Christopher Swain	1,769	35.8	N/A
Labour	Paul King	624	12.6	–7.4
Independent	George Hannah	118	2.4	N/A
Majority		663	13.4	
Turnout		4,943	37.7	
Conservative hold		Swing	▼18.3	

Thaxted
Party	Candidate	Votes	%	±%
Conservative	John Whitehead	2,522	52.2	–1.6
Alliance	John Gibb	1,624	33.6	N/A
Labour	Jennifer Oliveira	685	14.2	–11.7
Majority		898	18.6	
Turnout		4,831	43.3	
Conservative hold		Swing	▼17.6	

== By-elections ==
=== Basildon Vange ===
Basildon Vange: June 1986
Party	Candidate	Votes	%	±%
Labour	Mary Miller	2,050	73.1	+5.0
Conservative	Elizabeth Dines	386	13.8	–4.6
Liberal (Alliance)	Alan Banton	369	13.2	–0.3
Majority		1,664	59.3	
Turnout		2,805	21.4	
Registered electors		13,119		
Labour hold		Swing	▲4.8	

=== Grays Thurrock ===
Grays Thurrock: July 1986
Party	Candidate	Votes	%	±%
Labour	Beverly Barton	1,366	56.3	+1.1
Conservative	Harold Lott	1,060	43.7	–1.1
Majority		306	12.6	
Turnout		2,426	18.5	
Registered electors		13,124		
Labour hold		Swing	▲1.1	

=== Belfairs & Bellheim ===
Belfairs & Belnheim: February 1987
Party	Candidate	Votes	%	±%
Alliance	Albert Smulian	2,005	55.6	+2.3
Conservative	Terrence Birdseye	1,289	35.7	–0.3
Labour	Nigel Boorman	314	8.7	–1.1
Majority		716	19.9	
Turnout		3,608	33.0	
Registered electors		10,924		
Alliance hold		Swing	▲1.3	

=== Basildon Crouch ===
Basildon Crouch: December 1987
Party	Candidate	Votes	%	±%
Alliance	Francis Bellard	1,423	45.9	+14.1
Conservative	Terence Dove	1,288	41.5	–4.1
Labour	Margaret Davis	391	12.6	–10.0
Majority		135	4.4	
Turnout		3,102	30.0	
Registered electors		10,340		
Alliance gain from Conservative		Swing	▲9.1	

=== Maypole ===
Maypole: May 1988
Party	Candidate	Votes	%	±%
Alliance	Patricia Pascoe	2,035	42.3	–1.1
Labour	Donald Quinn	1,572	32.7	–6.9
Conservative	Mary Fairhead	1,200	25.0	+8.1
Majority		463	9.6	
Turnout		4,807	39.0	
Registered electors		12,321		
Alliance hold		Swing	▲2.9	
