= 1985 Hertfordshire County Council election =

1985 UK local government election

- 2 May 1985

All 77 seats to Hertfordshire County Council 39 seats needed for a majority
- Registered: 730,394
- Turnout: 45.3%

	First party	Second party
Party	Conservative	Labour
Seats won	36	27
Seat change	▼7	▼2
Popular vote	124,196	95,804
Percentage	37.6%	29.0%
Swing	▼5.5%	▼7.0%
	Third party	Fourth party
Party	Alliance	Residents
Seats won	14	0
Seat change	▲10	▼1
Popular vote	106,074	3,260
Percentage	32.1%	1.0%
Swing	▲13.1%	▲0.1%
Council control before election
Conservative
Council control after election
No overall control

The 1985 Hertfordshire County Council election took place on 2 May 1985 to elect members of Hertfordshire County Council in Hertfordshire, England. This was on the same day as other local elections.

== Summary ==
=== Election result ===
1985 Hertfordshire County Council election
Party	Candidates	Seats	Gains	Losses	Net gain/loss	Seats %	Votes %	Votes	+/−
Conservative	77	36	1	8	▼7	46.8	37.6	124,196	–5.5
Labour	76	27	1	3	▼2	35.1	29.0	95,804	–7.0
Alliance	76	14	10	0	▲10	18.2	32.1	106,074	+13.1
Residents	3	0	0	1	▼1	0.0	1.0	3,260	+0.1
Ecology	12	0	0	0	Steady	0.0	0.3	1,102	–0.1
Communist	1	0	0	0	Steady	0.0	<0.1	95	±0.0
Independent	1	0	0	0	Steady	0.0	<0.1	8	–0.4

== Division results by local authority ==
=== Broxbourne ===
Broxbourne District Summary
Party	Seats	+/-	Votes	%	+/-
Conservative	6	Steady	9,902	47.2	–1.6
Alliance	0	Steady	5,626	26.8	+6.5
Labour	0	Steady	5,408	25.8	–4.0
Ecology	0	Steady	63	0.3	N/A
Total	6	Steady	20,999	35.6	–8.1
Registered electors			58,927	–	+4.6

Division results

Cheshunt Central
Party	Candidate	Votes	%	±%
Conservative	J. Drew	1,562	45.6	–0.1
Labour	C. Robbins	1,255	36.7	–7.7
Alliance	P. Huse	606	17.7	+7.8
Majority		307	9.0	+7.6
Turnout		3,423	36.9	7.1
Registered electors		9,274		
Conservative hold		Swing	▲3.8	

Cheshunt North
Party	Candidate	Votes	%	±%
Conservative	E. Martin	1,377	49.0	+0.7
Labour	M. Bryant	816	29.0	–6.0
Alliance	K. King	620	22.0	+5.2
Majority		561	19.9	+6.6
Turnout		2,813	30.8	–10.3
Registered electors		9,125		
Conservative hold		Swing	▲3.4	

Cheshunt West
Party	Candidate	Votes	%	±%
Conservative	C. Tyler	1,734	48.5	–1.5
Alliance	D. Lefley	1,205	33.7	+2.5
Labour	M. Hudson	637	17.8	–1.0
Majority		529	14.8	–4.0
Turnout		3,76	35.5	–13.0
Registered electors		10,062		
Conservative hold		Swing	▼2.0	

Hoddesdon North
Party	Candidate	Votes	%	±%
Conservative	J. Rose*	1,787	47.9	–2.3
Labour	D. May	1,058	28.4	+3.1
Alliance	J. Gould	886	23.7	–0.8
Majority		729	19.5	–5.4
Turnout		3,731	39.8	–6.3
Registered electors		9,380		
Conservative hold		Swing	▼2.7	

Hoddesdon South
Party	Candidate	Votes	%	±%
Conservative	J. Fiddy*	1,888	49.3	–5.6
Alliance	R. Jones	1,431	37.4	+8.2
Labour	R. King	446	11.7	–4.2
Ecology	P. Sergent	63	1.6	N/A
Majority		457	11.9	–13.8
Turnout		3,828	38.1	–4.5
Registered electors		10,042		
Conservative hold		Swing	▼6.9	

Waltham Cross
Party	Candidate	Votes	%	±%
Conservative	H. Collins*	1,554	42.8	–0.8
Labour	A. Khwaja	1,196	33.0	–8.4
Alliance	W. Riley	878	24.2	+15.1
Majority		358	9.9	+7.7
Turnout		3,628	32.9	–7.8
Registered electors		11,044		
Conservative hold		Swing	▲3.8	

=== Dacorum ===
Dacorum District Summary
Party	Seats	+/-	Votes	%	+/-
Conservative	6	▲1	16,697	37.0	–5.3
Labour	3	▼2	14,626	32.4	–10.9
Alliance	1	▲1	13,553	30.0	+16.9
Ecology	0	Steady	157	0.3	–0.7
Communist	0	Steady	95	0.2	±0.0
Total	10	Steady	45,128	45.0	–2.7
Registered electors			100,238	–	+3.7

Division results

Berkhamsted
Party	Candidate	Votes	%	±%
Conservative	H. Rost*	2,245	44.8	–5.7
Alliance	V. Earl	1,632	32.5	+9.5
Labour	R. Houlton	1,139	22.7	–3.8
Majority		613	12.2	–11.9
Turnout		5,016	42.1	–5.6
Registered electors		11,905		
Conservative hold		Swing	▼7.6	

Bridgewater
Party	Candidate	Votes	%	±%
Conservative	F. Seely	1,974	59.1	–4.2
Alliance	S. Papadimitriou	870	26.0	+9.0
Labour	K. Short	496	14.9	–4.8
Majority		1,104	33.1	–10.6
Turnout		3,340	41.6	–2.5
Registered electors		8,025		
Conservative hold		Swing	▼6.6	

Hemel Hempstead East
Party	Candidate	Votes	%	±%
Conservative	A. Britton	1,629	35.5	–5.6
Alliance	C. Owen	1,502	32.8	+23.5
Labour	J. Mercer*	1,452	31.7	–14.3
Majority		127	2.8	N/A
Turnout		4,583	49.5	–0.4
Registered electors		9,263		
Conservative gain from Labour		Swing	▼14.6	

Hemel Hempstead North East
Party	Candidate	Votes	%	±%
Alliance	W. Evans	1,438	34.9	+16.6
Labour	J. Cotton	1,425	34.6	–14.4
Conservative	C. Lill	1,255	30.5	–0.5
Majority		13	0.3	N/A
Turnout		4,118	41.1	–2.7
Registered electors		10,009		
Alliance gain from Labour		Swing	▲15.5	

Hemel Hempstead North West
Party	Candidate	Votes	%	±%
Labour	D. Moss*	2,414	49.2	–20.9
Alliance	E. Willis	1,396	28.4	N/A
Conservative	M. Griffiths	1,099	22.4	–5.6
Majority		1,018	20.7	–21.4
Turnout		4,909	48.6	–1.0
Registered electors		10,107		
Labour hold				

Hemel Hempstead South East
Party	Candidate	Votes	%	±%
Labour	R. Thorpe-Tracey*	2,314	46.2	–12.7
Alliance	S. Watkins	1,396	27.8	+17.0
Conservative	K. Williams	1,304	26.0	–4.3
Majority		918	18.3	–10.3
Turnout		5,014	44.9	–4.1
Registered electors		11,173		
Labour hold		Swing	▼14.9	

Hemel Hempstead St Pauls
Party	Candidate	Votes	%	±%
Labour	P. Doyle*	2,023	50.4	–13.4
Alliance	V. Preece	1,287	32.1	+14.8
Conservative	D. Lowe	703	17.5	–1.4
Majority		736	18.3	–26.6
Turnout		4,013	46.1	–1.8
Registered electors		8,708		
Labour hold		Swing	▼14.1	

Hemel Hempstead Town
Party	Candidate	Votes	%	±%
Conservative	C. Everall*	2,340	45.3	–10.4
Labour	M. Sullivan	1,551	30.0	–14.3
Alliance	G. Masters	1,176	22.8	N/A
Communist	R. Leigh	95	1.8	N/A
Majority		789	15.3	+3.9
Turnout		5,162	44.5	–3.7
Registered electors		11,594		
Conservative hold		Swing	▲2.0	

Kings Langley
Party	Candidate	Votes	%	±%
Conservative	A. Anderson*	1,843	45.4	–13.1
Alliance	J. Whyte	1,464	36.0	+16.3
Labour	S. Cox	756	18.6	–3.3
Majority		379	9.3	–27.3
Turnout		4,063	47.8	–2.5
Registered electors		8,492		
Conservative hold		Swing	▼14.7	

Tring
Party	Candidate	Votes	%	±%
Conservative	H. Marwood	2,305	46.9	–3.7
Alliance	E. Williams	1,392	28.4	+8.9
Labour	J. Dymond	1,056	21.5	–1.7
Ecology	R. Oliver	157	3.2	–3.4
Majority		913	18.6	–8.8
Turnout		4,910	44.8	–2.0
Registered electors		10,962		
Conservative hold		Swing	▼6.3	

=== East Hertfordshire ===
East Hertfordshire District Summary
Party	Seats	+/-	Votes	%	+/-
Conservative	6	▼1	15,265	40.7	–5.1
Alliance	2	▲2	13,463	35.9	+13.6
Labour	1	Steady	6,638	17.7	–7.2
Residents	0	▼1	1,701	4.5	–1.9
Ecology	0	Steady	453	1.2	N/A
Independent	0	Steady	8	<0.1	N/A
Total	9	Steady	37,528	44.2	–3.0
Registered electors			84,979	–	+5.8

Division results

All Saints
Party	Candidate	Votes	%	±%
Conservative	J. Forrester*	1,617	41.3	–8.7
Alliance	J. Edrich	1,286	32.8	+16.2
Labour	R. Hodgson	921	23.5	–9.9
Ecology	D. Holt	94	2.4	N/A
Majority		331	8.4	–8.2
Turnout		3,918	47.3	–3.8
Registered electors		8,281		
Conservative hold		Swing	▼12.5	

Bishops Stortford Central Parsonag
Party	Candidate	Votes	%	±%
Alliance	M. Wood	1,268	33.3	+16.4
Residents	V. Ellison*	1,043	27.4	–6.8
Conservative	P. George	846	22.2	–3.4
Labour	M. Smith	648	17.0	–6.2
Majority		225	5.9	–2.7
Turnout		3,805	38.9	–5.6
Registered electors		9,777		
Alliance gain from Residents		Swing	▲11.6	

Bishops Stortford Chantry Thorley
Party	Candidate	Votes	%	±%
Conservative	J. Fielder*	1,565	39.4	–0.8
Alliance	D. James	1,427	35.9	+16.2
Residents	R. Parker	658	16.5	–9.8
Labour	B. Whitelaw	327	8.2	–5.6
Majority		138	3.5	–10.5
Turnout		3,977	43.8	–6.9
Registered electors		9,064		
Conservative hold		Swing	▼8.5	

Baughing
Party	Candidate	Votes	%	±%
Conservative	J. Pitman	1,780	45.4	–1.2
Alliance	D. Beavan	1,630	41.5	+9.5
Labour	L. Saunders	514	13.1	–2.1
Majority		150	3.8	–10.7
Turnout		3,924	43.7	–2.2
Registered electors		8,973		
Conservative hold		Swing	▼5.4	

Hertford Rural
Party	Candidate	Votes	%	±%
Conservative	R. Abel-Smith	2,537	55.0	+2.3
Alliance	A. Creedy	1,137	24.6	–1.3
Labour	D. Morgan	941	20.4	–1.0
Majority		1,400	30.3	+3.5
Turnout		4,615	46.5	–3.5
Registered electors		9,924		
Conservative hold		Swing	▲1.8	

Sawbridgeworth
Party	Candidate	Votes	%	±%
Conservative	B. Smalley	2,022	48.8	–4.1
Alliance	K. Rideout	1,644	39.7	+8.9
Labour	M. Jackson	397	9.6	–6.8
Ecology	G. Cole	81	2.0	N/A
Majority		378	9.1	–13.0
Turnout		4,144	41.3	–1.7
Registered electors		10,037		
Conservative hold		Swing	▼6.5	

St Andrews
Party	Candidate	Votes	%	±%
Labour	G. Perrett	1,467	37.5	–4.4
Conservative	J. Cook	1,331	34.0	–7.7
Alliance	P. Elven	1,054	26.9	+10.6
Ecology	J. Holt	57	1.5	N/A
Independent	J. Bardwaj	8	0.2	N/A
Majority		136	3.5	+3.3
Turnout		3,909	44.5	–7.1
Registered electors		8,794		
Labour hold		Swing	▲1.7	

Ware North
Party	Candidate	Votes	%	±%
Alliance	M. Coleman	2,832	52.7	+24.1
Conservative	H. Banks	1,800	33.5	–13.0
Labour	R. Cooper	623	11.6	–13.4
Ecology	R. Street	114	2.1	N/A
Majority		1,032	19.2	N/A
Turnout		5,369	49.9	+4.8
Registered electors		10,764		
Alliance gain from Conservative		Swing	▲18.6	

Ware South
Party	Candidate	Votes	%	±%
Conservative	C. Bowsher*	1,767	45.8	–8.5
Alliance	A. Ward	1,185	30.7	+17.5
Labour	A. Leggat	800	20.7	–11.8
Ecology	P. Downie	107	2.8	N/A
Majority		582	15.1	–6.8
Turnout		3,859	41.2	–4.2
Registered electors		9,365		
Conservative hold		Swing	▼13.0	

=== Hertsmere ===
Hertsmere District Summary
Party	Seats	+/-	Votes	%	+/-
Conservative	4	Steady	12,105	42.5	–3.1
Labour	2	Steady	7,508	26.4	–1.4
Alliance	1	Steady	8,870	31.3	+4.5
Total	7	Steady	28,483	43.6	–5.2
Registered electors			65,307	–	–1.9

Division results

Bushey Heath
Party	Candidate	Votes	%	±%
Conservative	J. Hudson	1,522	52.0	–8.4
Alliance	P. Jenkins	1,101	37.6	–2.0
Labour	D. Bearfield	303	10.4	N/A
Majority		421	14.4	–6.4
Turnout		2,926	40.2	–5.8
Registered electors		7,277		
Conservative hold		Swing	▼3.2	

Bushey North
Party	Candidate	Votes	%	±%
Alliance	M. Colne*	3,162	59.6	+3.5
Conservative	B. Slaney	1,459	27.5	–8.1
Labour	D. Schofield	680	12.8	+4.5
Majority		1,703	32.1	+11.7
Turnout		5,301	53.5	–1.5
Registered electors		9,901		
Alliance hold		Swing	▲5.8	

Elstree
Party	Candidate	Votes	%	±%
Labour	B. York	1,961	41.3	–7.2
Conservative	J. Pendlington	1,942	40.9	+1.1
Alliance	M. Kirsh	849	17.9	+6.2
Majority		19	0.4	–8.3
Turnout		4,752	45.0	–3.0
Registered electors		10,554		
Labour hold		Swing	▼4.2	

Lyndhurst
Party	Candidate	Votes	%	±%
Labour	J. Metcalfe*	2,057	60.6	–8.1
Conservative	A. Rozansky	714	21.0	–1.4
Alliance	L. Reefe	624	18.4	+9.5
Majority		1,343	39.6	–6.7
Turnout		3,395	35.8	–8.2
Registered electors		9,478		
Labour hold		Swing	▼3.4	

Potters Bar North East
Party	Candidate	Votes	%	±%
Conservative	D. Gregory	2,077	62.4	+1.5
Alliance	M. Pearce	747	22.5	–2.6
Labour	R. Page	502	15.1	+1.2
Majority		1,330	40.0	+4.2
Turnout		3,326	40.0	–8.0
Registered electors		8,306		
Conservative hold		Swing	▲2.1	

Potters Bar South West
Party	Candidate	Votes	%	±%
Conservative	R. Fielding*	2,042	54.1	+2.3
Alliance	D. Martin	1,052	27.9	–0.5
Labour	E. Longley	681	18.0	–1.8
Majority		990	26.2	+2.9
Turnout		3,775	39.3	–11.7
Registered electors		9,597		
Conservative hold		Swing	▲1.4	

Watling
Party	Candidate	Votes	%	±%
Conservative	N. Saunders*	2,349	46.9	–8.1
Alliance	N. Frostick	1,335	26.7	+10.7
Labour	H. Holmes	1,324	26.4	–2.7
Majority		1,014	20.2	–5.7
Turnout		5,008	49.1	–0.9
Registered electors		10,194		
Conservative hold		Swing	▼9.4	

=== North Hertfordshire ===
North Hertfordshire District Summary
Party	Seats	+/-	Votes	%	+/-
Labour	4	Steady	11,873	28.1	–13.3
Conservative	3	▼2	15,631	37.0	–5.8
Alliance	2	▲2	13,191	31.2	+19.4
Residents	0	Steady	1,559	3.7	+2.1
Total	9	Steady	42,254	51.0	+5.9
Registered electors			82,885	–	+5.0

Division results

Hitchin North East
Party	Candidate	Votes	%	±%
Labour	F. Peacock*	2,031	37.0	–12.1
Residents	K. Logan	1,559	28.4	N/A
Conservative	I. Dixon	1,272	23.2	–10.3
Alliance	S. Hinchcliffe	627	11.4	–3.6
Majority		472	8.6	–7.0
Turnout		5,489	52.6	+4.4
Registered electors		10,437		
Labour hold				

Hitchin South
Party	Candidate	Votes	%	±%
Conservative	D. Ashley	1,922	50.5	–18.9
Alliance	E. Burton	1,435	37.7	N/A
Labour	M. Goldsmith	446	11.7	–10.8
Majority		487	12.8	–34.1
Turnout		3,803	49.2	+5.6
Registered electors		7,734		
Conservative hold				

Knebworth & Codicote
Party	Candidate	Votes	%	±%
Conservative	K. Crofton*	1,950	50.6	–9.3
Alliance	A. Hudson	1,127	29.3	N/A
Labour	D. Kitchener	774	20.1	–5.1
Majority		823	21.4	–13.3
Turnout		3,851	45.0	–1.1
Registered electors		8,551		
Conservative hold				

Letchworth East & Baldock
Party	Candidate	Votes	%	±%
Labour	A. Gorst	2,160	42.8	–14.7
Conservative	C. Smith	1,499	29.7	–6.5
Alliance	T. Madden	1,392	27.6	N/A
Majority		661	13.1	–8.2
Turnout		5,051	49.5	+1.4
Registered electors		10,200		
Labour hold		Swing	▼4.1	

Letchworth North West
Party	Candidate	Votes	%	±%
Labour	M. Kearns	2,109	44.6	–18.7
Alliance	E. Holloway	1,319	27.9	N/A
Conservative	D. Brown	1,300	27.5	–9.2
Majority		790	16.7	–9.9
Turnout		4,728	51.1	+3.1
Registered electors		9,252		
Labour hold				

Letchworth South
Party	Candidate	Votes	%	±%
Alliance	D. Attwood	2,952	47.1	+22.1
Conservative	C. Emsall	2,071	33.0	–12.2
Labour	D. Evans	1,248	19.9	–9.9
Majority		881	14.0	N/A
Turnout		6,271	59.0	+7.5
Registered electors		10,621		
Alliance gain from Conservative		Swing	▲17.2	

North Herts Rural
Party	Candidate	Votes	%	±%
Conservative	B. Goble*	2,068	57.3	+5.7
Alliance	B. Thompson	903	23.0	–4.3
Labour	I. Mantle	631	17.5	–1.4
Majority		1,165	32.2	+9.9
Turnout		3,602	47.7	–3.1
Registered electors		7,562		
Conservative hold		Swing	▲5.0	

Offa
Party	Candidate	Votes	%	±%
Labour	D. Billing*	1,811	42.5	–9.5
Conservative	J. Jackson	1,307	30.7	–12.0
Alliance	J. Sefton	1,142	26.8	N/A
Majority		504	11.8	+2.5
Turnout		4,260	45.5	–1.7
Registered electors		9,371		
Labour hold		Swing	▲1.3	

Royston
Party	Candidate	Votes	%	±%
Alliance	P. Kennington	2,294	44.1	+14.8
Conservative	H. Greenfield*	2,242	43.1	–3.8
Labour	J. Walker	663	12.8	–11.0
Majority		52	1.0	N/A
Turnout		5,199	56.8	+10.7
Registered electors		9,157		
Alliance gain from Conservative		Swing	▲9.3	

=== St Albans ===
St Albans District Summary
Party	Seats	+/-	Votes	%	+/-
Conservative	5	▼4	19,067	40.2	–6.4
Alliance	4	▲3	19,038	40.2	+12.0
Labour	1	▲1	8,950	18.9	–3.5
Ecology	0	Steady	349	0.7	N/A
Total	10	Steady	47,404	50.5	+2.5
Registered electors			93,810	–	+3.5

Division results

Harpenden North East
Party	Candidate	Votes	%	±%
Conservative	J. Hudson	2,607	45.6	–6.4
Alliance	N. Macmillan	2,363	41.3	+10.6
Labour	D. Crew	622	10.9	–6.5
Ecology	H. Swailes	123	2.2	N/A
Majority		244	4.3	–17.0
Turnout		5,715	53.4	+8.9
Registered electors		10,699		
Conservative hold		Swing	▼8.5	

Harpenden South West
Party	Candidate	Votes	%	±%
Conservative	I. Tarry*	2,825	57.5	–7.1
Alliance	J. Glendinning	1,653	33.6	+9.1
Labour	T. Morris	340	6.9	–4.0
Ecology	P. Morris	97	2.0	N/A
Majority		1,172	23.8	–22.2
Turnout		4,915	48.4	+2.4
Registered electors		10,146		
Conservative hold		Swing	▼8.1	

Sandridge
Party	Candidate	Votes	%	±%
Alliance	L. Coates	1,875	47.1	+13.5
Conservative	R. Ellis	1,685	42.3	–6.9
Labour	C. Pearce	361	9.1	–8.1
Ecology	A. O'Dell	60	1.5	N/A
Majority		190	4.8	N/A
Turnout		3,981	47.9	+1.5
Registered electors		8,305		
Alliance gain from Conservative		Swing	▲10.2	

St Albans Central
Party	Candidate	Votes	%	±%
Alliance	G. Tattersfield	1,854	40.0	+11.4
Conservative	M. Lucey	1,597	34.4	–8.2
Labour	G. Powell	1,187	25.6	–3.3
Majority		257	5.5	N/A
Turnout		4,638	52.9	+2.8
Registered electors		8,771		
Alliance gain from Conservative		Swing	▲9.8	

St Albans East
Party	Candidate	Votes	%	±%
Alliance	D. Perrett*	2,487	50.7	+9.3
Conservative	C. Ellis	1,567	31.9	–3.6
Labour	A. Skinner	851	17.3	–5.8
Majority		920	18.8	+12.9
Turnout		4,905	51.7	+1.3
Registered electors		9,485		
Alliance hold		Swing	▲6.5	

St Albans North
Party	Candidate	Votes	%	±%
Conservative	A. Hill*	1,964	39.0	–1.3
Alliance	L. Turner	1,915	38.1	+3.1
Labour	D. McManus	1,153	22.9	–1.8
Majority		49	1.0	–4.4
Turnout		5,032	53.1	+4.1
Registered electors		9,481		
Conservative hold		Swing	▼2.2	

St Albans Rural
Party	Candidate	Votes	%	±%
Conservative	R. Scranage	1,981	44.8	–7.0
Alliance	S. Whittaker	1,843	41.7	N/A
Labour	K. Spooner	530	12.0	–9.0
Ecology	J. Bishop	69	1.6	N/A
Majority		138	3.1	–21.4
Turnout		4,423	48.5	–1.2
Registered electors		9,120		
Conservative hold				

St Albans South
Party	Candidate	Votes	%	±%
Conservative	R. Durrant*	2,008	39.1	–2.1
Labour	Kerry Pollard	1,640	31.9	+3.7
Alliance	C. Gunner	1,487	29.0	–1.6
Majority		368	7.2	–3.4
Turnout		5,135	52.7	+3.8
Registered electors		9,736		
Conservative hold		Swing	▼2.9	

St Stephens
Party	Candidate	Votes	%	±%
Alliance	M. Moore	2,457	52.5	+18.7
Conservative	K. Hill	1,697	36.3	–12.5
Labour	L. Taber	523	11.2	–6.2
Majority		760	16.2	N/A
Turnout		4,577	47.5	+2.9
Registered electors		9,847		
Alliance gain from Conservative		Swing	▲15.6	

The Colneys
Party	Candidate	Votes	%	±%
Labour	M. Macmillan	1,743	43.8	+6.5
Conservative	A. Gattward	1,136	28.5	–9.1
Alliance	M. Lawson	1,104	27.7	+2.6
Majority		607	15.2	N/A
Turnout		3,983	48.5	+5.6
Registered electors		8,220		
Labour gain from Conservative		Swing	▲7.8	

=== Stevenage ===
Stevenage District Summary
Party	Seats	+/-	Votes	%	+/-
Labour	5	▼1	11,091	47.4	–6.6
Alliance	1	▲1	7,563	32.3	+12.1
Conservative	0	Steady	4,726	20.2	–5.3
Total	6	Steady	23,380	41.9	–2.0
Registered electors			55,767	–	+3.3

Division results

Bedwell
Party	Candidate	Votes	%	±%
Labour	H. Lawrence*	2,338	60.2	+2.7
Alliance	P. Herbert	815	21.0	+3.1
Conservative	F. Haine	730	18.8	–5.8
Majority		1,523	39.2	+6.3
Turnout		3,883	41.9	–5.7
Registered electors		9,266		
Labour hold		Swing	▼0.2	

Broadwater
Party	Candidate	Votes	%	±%
Labour	W. Sheaff*	1,826	42.3	–7.8
Alliance	S. Booth	1,712	39.7	+17.3
Conservative	A. Hurst	774	17.9	–8.3
Majority		114	2.6	–21.3
Turnout		4,312	46.6	+2.8
Registered electors		9,252		
Labour hold		Swing	▼12.6	

Chells
Party	Candidate	Votes	%	±%
Labour	J. Lloyd*	1,635	50.6	–6.4
Alliance	B. Clarke	972	30.1	+8.8
Conservative	A. Finch	623	19.3	–2.4
Majority		663	20.5	–14.9
Turnout		3,230	38.3	–6.0
Registered electors		8,432		
Labour hold		Swing	▼7.6	

Old Stevenage
Party	Candidate	Votes	%	±%
Labour	M. Cherney	1,918	41.5	–5.1
Conservative	E. Wignall	1,496	32.4	–5.2
Alliance	A. Christy	1,209	26.2	+10.4
Majority		422	9.1	+0.1
Turnout		4,623	43.6	–1.7
Registered electors		10,592		
Labour hold		Swing	▲0.1	

Shephall
Party	Candidate	Votes	%	±%
Labour	S. Munden	1,764	59.4	–4.2
Alliance	D. Kelleher	749	25.2	+5.7
Conservative	K. Painter	459	15.4	–1.5
Majority		1,015	34.2	–9.9
Turnout		2,972	34.7	–5.8
Registered electors		8,554		
Labour hold		Swing	▼5.0	

St Nicholas
Party	Candidate	Votes	%	±%
Alliance	B. Stoneham	2,106	48.3	+22.8
Labour	P. Alexander	1,610	36.9	–15.2
Conservative	S. Woods	644	14.8	–7.6
Majority		496	11.4	N/A
Turnout		4,360	45.1	+2.1
Registered electors		9,671		
Alliance gain from Labour		Swing	▲19.0	

=== Three Rivers ===
Three Rivers District Summary
Party	Seats	+/-	Votes	%	+/-
Alliance	3	▲1	12,921	41.5	+16.3
Conservative	3	▼1	12,801	41.1	–8.7
Labour	1	Steady	5,414	17.4	–7.7
Total	7	Steady	31,136	45.9	4.4
Registered electors			67,790	–	+1.3

Division results

Abbotts Langley
Party	Candidate	Votes	%	±%
Alliance	P. Croft	2,405	40.7	+15.3
Conservative	R. Peevers*	1,929	32.7	–6.3
Labour	G. Abraham	1,569	26.6	–9.1
Majority		476	8.1	N/A
Turnout		5,903	49.2	–5.3
Registered electors		11,994		
Alliance gain from Conservative		Swing	▲10.8	

Chorleywood
Party	Candidate	Votes	%	±%
Conservative	F. Cogan*	2,083	50.9	–14.2
Alliance	J. Jarrett	1,633	39.9	+16.0
Labour	M. Hilmi	377	9.2	–1.8
Majority		450	11.0	–30.2
Turnout		4,093	47.5	–1.4
Registered electors		8,610		
Conservative hold		Swing	▼15.1	

Croxley
Party	Candidate	Votes	%	±%
Alliance	J. Vosper*	2,310	52.8	+10.6
Conservative	G. Taylor-Rose	1,470	33.6	–8.0
Labour	M. Carpenter	599	13.7	–2.5
Majority		840	19.2	+18.5
Turnout		4,379	50.8	–2.2
Registered electors		8,627		
Alliance hold		Swing	▲9.3	

North Mymms
Party	Candidate	Votes	%	±%
Conservative	A. Roy*	2,708	69.1	–14.7
Alliance	W. Parkinson	903	23.0	N/A
Labour	E. Shelton	310	7.9	–8.3
Majority		1,805	46.0	–21.6
Turnout		3,921	44.9	–6.7
Registered electors		8,730		
Conservative hold				

Oxhey Park
Party	Candidate	Votes	%	±%
Conservative	S. Purkiss*	2,190	51.4	–13.7
Alliance	N. Robinson	2,067	48.6	+28.8
Majority		123	2.9	–42.4
Turnout		4,257	43.6	–2.4
Registered electors		9,761		
Conservative hold		Swing	▼21.3	

Rickmansworth
Party	Candidate	Votes	%	±%
Alliance	A. Witney*	2,834	54.3	+10.5
Conservative	B. Fisher	1,830	35.0	–5.7
Labour	C. Bradfield	558	10.7	–4.8
Majority		1,004	19.2	+16.2
Turnout		5,222	49.2	–4.1
Registered electors		10,618		
Alliance hold		Swing	▲8.1	

South Oxhey
Party	Candidate	Votes	%	±%
Labour	D. Waddington*	2,001	59.5	–6.7
Alliance	D. Duffy	769	22.9	+8.9
Conservative	C. Grindell	591	17.6	–2.2
Majority		1,232	36.7	–9.7
Turnout		3,361	35.6	–8.4
Registered electors		9,450		
Labour hold		Swing	▼7.8	

=== Watford ===
Watford District Summary
Party	Seats	+/-	Votes	%	+/-
Labour	5	Steady	9,972	42.7	–1.4
Conservative	1	Steady	7,866	33.7	–4.1
Alliance	0	Steady	5,412	23.2	+5.0
Ecology	0	Steady	80	0.3	N/A
Total	6	Steady	23,330	41.2	–3.3
Registered electors			56,613	–	+2.4

Division results

Callowland Leggatts
Party	Candidate	Votes	%	±%
Labour	J. Dore*	1,927	61.6	–1.0
Conservative	P. Rosen	634	20.3	–2.8
Alliance	J. Richmond	566	18.1	+3.8
Majority		1,293	41.3	+1.9
Turnout		3,127	36.7	–1.9
Registered electors		8,520		
Labour hold		Swing	▲0.9	

Central Oxhey
Party	Candidate	Votes	%	±%
Labour	A. Ramsden	1,542	40.6	+1.1
Conservative	J. Pike	1,371	36.1	–0.5
Alliance	J. Briggs	884	23.3	–0.5
Majority		171	4.5	+1.6
Turnout		3,797	43.3	–6.4
Registered electors		8,759		
Labour hold		Swing	▲0.8	

Meriden Tudor
Party	Candidate	Votes	%	±%
Labour	R. Fricker	2,083	46.7	–1.1
Conservative	I. Tunstall-Dunn	1,230	27.6	–2.5
Alliance	S. Sharpe	1,064	23.9	+1.8
Ecology	A. Leader	80	1.8	N/A
Majority		853	19.1	+1.4
Turnout		4,457	42.4	+0.2
Registered electors		10,509		
Labour hold		Swing	▲0.7	

Nascot Park
Party	Candidate	Votes	%	±%
Conservative	P. Klely	2,515	57.1	–10.3
Alliance	J. Thewlis	1,326	30.1	+11.6
Labour	D. McGrath	563	12.8	–1.3
Majority		1,189	27.0	–21.9
Turnout		4,404	48.7	+2.3
Registered electors		9,051		
Conservative hold		Swing	▼11.0	

Vicarage Holywell
Party	Candidate	Votes	%	±%
Labour	S. Meldrum	1,904	56.6	+3.6
Conservative	J. Price	918	27.3	–5.0
Alliance	D. Zirker	544	16.2	+1.6
Majority		986	29.3	+8.6
Turnout		3,366	33.6	–10.8
Registered electors		10,022		
Labour hold		Swing	▲4.3	

Woodside Stanborough
Party	Candidate	Votes	%	±%
Labour	C. Dore*	1,953	46.7	–4.2
Conservative	A. Nowell	1,198	28.7	–5.6
Alliance	J. Blackman	1,028	24.6	+9.8
Majority		755	18.1	+1.6
Turnout		4,179	42.9	–0.3
Registered electors		9,752		
Labour hold		Swing	▲0.7	

=== Welwyn Hatfield ===
Welwyn Hatfield District Summary
Party	Seats	+/-	Votes	%	+/-
Labour	5	Steady	14,324	46.4	–8.8
Conservative	2	Steady	10,136	32.8	–6.9
Alliance	0	Steady	6,437	20.8	+16.4
Total	7	Steady	30,897	48.2	–6.2
Registered electors			64,078	–	+1.7

Division results

Haldens
Party	Candidate	Votes	%	±%
Labour	F. Clayton	2,110	56.6	–11.7
Conservative	F. Ryder	880	23.6	–8.1
Alliance	D. West	740	19.8	N/A
Majority		1,230	33.0	–3.5
Turnout		3,730	43.2	–8.3
Registered electors		8,625		
Labour hold		Swing	▼1.8	

Hatfield East
Party	Candidate	Votes	%	±%
Conservative	D. Westbeech	1,672	41.3	–7.8
Labour	J. Scott	1,553	38.3	–1.2
Alliance	J. Edell	828	20.4	+8.9
Majority		119	2.9	–6.7
Turnout		4,053	48.6	–4.8
Registered electors		8,341		
Conservative hold		Swing	▼3.3	

Hatfield North
Party	Candidate	Votes	%	±%
Labour	S. Clark*	2,057	48.5	–12.4
Conservative	B. Sherriff	1,271	30.0	–9.1
Alliance	M. Richardson	909	21.5	N/A
Majority		786	18.6	–3.1
Turnout		4,237	46.5	–7.1
Registered electors		9,115		
Labour hold		Swing	▼1.6	

Hatfield South
Party	Candidate	Votes	%	±%
Labour	G. Wenham*	1,955	48.5	–10.1
Conservative	P. Storey	1,130	28.0	–12.4
Alliance	R. Griffiths	948	23.5	N/A
Majority		825	20.5	+2.4
Turnout		4,033	49.6	–6.4
Registered electors		8,139		
Labour hold		Swing	▲1.2	

Welwyn
Party	Candidate	Votes	%	±%
Conservative	A. Lower*	2,122	48.6	–12.3
Labour	G. Ridgewell	1,143	26.2	–12.9
Alliance	G. Limby	1,098	25.2	N/A
Majority		979	22.4	+0.6
Turnout		4,363	46.8	–6.0
Registered electors		9,313		
Conservative hold		Swing	▲0.3	

Welwyn Garden City South
Party	Candidate	Votes	%	±%
Labour	A. Brind	2,898	71.3	–3.8
Conservative	J. Aldridge	1,166	28.7	+3.8
Majority		1,732	42.6	–7.7
Turnout		4,064	44.0	–10.3
Registered electors		9,233		
Labour hold		Swing	▼3.8	

Welwyn Garden City West
Party	Candidate	Votes	%	±%
Labour	R. Mays	2,608	40.6	–6.4
Alliance	A. Last	1,914	29.8	+14.3
Conservative	W. Storey	1,895	29.5	–5.4
Majority		694	10.8	–1.3
Turnout		6,417	56.7	–2.3
Registered electors		11,312		
Labour hold		Swing	▼10.4	
