= 1985 Dorset County Council election =

1985 English local election

1985 Dorset County Council election took place on Thursday, 2 May 1985, alongside other local elections across the United Kingdom. Following boundary changes the number of seats up for election was reduced to 77 from 91. All 77 seats of Dorset County Council were up for election.

The result was that the Conservatives retained their majority control, winning 42 seats, a loss of 11. The SDP–Liberal Alliance gained 10 seats to finish with 16. Labour lost 7 seats to finish with 4. 5 others were elected, down 6.

== Election result by division ==
Members of the old council *

=== North Dorset (11 seats) ===
Blackmore Vale
Party	Candidate	Votes	%	±%
Liberal	G. 'Joe' Rose	1,498	48.7	n/a
Conservative	G Pitt-Rivers*	1,434	46.6	−30.8
Labour	D Wardleworth	147	4.8	−17.8
Majority			2.1	
Turnout			50.0	+6.8
Liberal gain from Conservative		Swing	+39.7	

Blandford
Party	Candidate	Votes	%	±%
Liberal	Barrie Cooper	1,237	49.1	n/a
Conservative	F Nightingale*	893	35.5	−5.1
Labour	Hadyn White	389	15.4	n/a
Majority			13.7	
Turnout			39.6	+4.4
Liberal gain from Conservative		Swing	+27.1	

Colehill
Party	Candidate	Votes	%	±%
Conservative	B Morden	1,439	51.8	
Liberal	P Bartlett	1,133	40.8	
Labour	R Pitman	204	7.3	
Majority			11.0	
Turnout			39.0	
Conservative hold		Swing		

Cranborne Chase
Party	Candidate	Votes	%	±%
Liberal	Alan Humphries	1,242	51.4	
Conservative	H Swatridge	1,047	43.3	
Labour	J Allen	127	5.3	
Majority			8.1	
Turnout			43.8	
Liberal hold		Swing		

Gillingham
Party	Candidate	Votes	%	±%
Conservative	R Bircumshaw	1,478	55.8	
SDP	D Lawrence	960	36.2	
Labour	J Hanley	213	8.0	
Majority			2.6	
Turnout			44.6	
Conservative hold		Swing		

Hambledon
Party	Candidate	Votes	%	±%
Conservative	C Mitchell*	1,352	47.7	
Liberal	P Hamilton	1,279	45.2	n/a
Labour	W Kingswell	201	7.1	n/a
Majority			2.6	n/a
Turnout			44.9	n/a
Conservative hold		Swing	n/a	

Corfe Mullen
Party	Candidate	Votes	%	±%
SDP	S Goss-Custard	1,370	48.0	+16.6
Conservative	M Guarella*	1,225	43.0	−25.6
Labour	L Shooter	257	9.0	n/a
Majority			5.1	42.2
Turnout			40.6	+5.2
SDP gain from Conservative		Swing	+21.1	

Lytchett
Party	Candidate	Votes	%	±%
Conservative	C Lees	1,377	49.9	
Liberal	M Wilkins	987	35.8	
Labour	D Barker	395	14.3	
Majority			14.1	
Turnout			37.2	
Conservative hold		Swing		

Minster
Party	Candidate	Votes	%	±%
SDP	P Hymers	1,306	48.6	
Conservative	A Wright*	1,117	41.6	
Labour	G White	265	9.9	
Majority			7.0	
Turnout			41.6	
SDP gain from Conservative		Swing		

Shaftesbury
Party	Candidate	Votes	%	±%
Conservative	G Hine	1,540	49.9	+5.6
Liberal	Audrey Perry*	1,325	42.9	−12.8
Labour	K Davies	221	7.2	n/a
Majority			7.0	18.5
Turnout			45.8	−5.7
Conservative gain from Liberal		Swing	+9.2	

Winterborne
Party	Candidate	Votes	%	±%
Conservative	D Jones*	1,430	54.2	
SDP	L Dean	861	32.7	n/a
Labour	J Fox	346	13.1	n/a
Majority			21.6	n/a
Turnout			39.8	n/a
Conservative hold		Swing	n/a	
