= 1985 West Glamorgan County Council election =

1985 Welsh local government election

The fourth election to West Glamorgan County Council was held in May 1985. It was preceded by the 1981 election and followed by the 1989 election.

== Candidates ==
Once again, the Labour Party fielded candidates in every ward. In addition to the Conservative Party and Plaid Cymru, a significant number of seats were contested by the SDP/Liberal Alliance. There were fewer Ratepayer candidates than at previous elections.

In the Neath area, Labour contested all thirteen seats, with Plaid Cymru running nine candidates.

== Outcome ==
Labour retained their majority.

== Results ==
- indicates sitting councillor

== Ward results ==
=== Aberavon East and West (three seats) ===
Aberavon East and West 1985
Party	Candidate	Votes	%	±%
Labour	Colin Crowley*	3,703		
Labour	Cyril Lewis*	3,389		
Labour	Pat Jones*	3,310		
Alliance	T. Johnston	1,090		
Alliance	E. Prescott	1,050		
Alliance	B. Makinson	783		
Turnout			43.1	
Labour hold		Swing		
Labour hold		Swing		
Labour hold		Swing		

=== Aberavon North (one seat) ===
Aberavon North 1985
Party	Candidate	Votes	%	±%
Labour	Malcolm Harris	2,063		
Ratepayers	L. Griffiths	937		
Alliance	J. Larsen	419		
Turnout				
Labour hold		Swing		

=== Aberavon South (one seat) ===
Aberavon South 1985
Party	Candidate	Votes	%	±%
Labour	W. Llewellyn	1,183		
Alliance	A. Taylor	641		
Turnout				
Labour hold		Swing		

=== Brynmelyn (two seats) ===
Brynmelyn 1977
Party	Candidate	Votes	%	±%
Labour	R. Dowdle*	1,407		
Labour	J. Adams*	1,334		
Conservative	P. Morgan	382		
Ratepayers	M. John	348		
Turnout			43.8	
Labour hold		Swing		
Labour hold		Swing		

=== Castle (two seats) ===
Castle 1973
Party	Candidate	Votes	%	±%
Labour	D. Jones	945		
Labour	B. Ludlam*	893		
Ratepayers	I. Williams	558		
Ratepayers	B. Matthews	508		
Conservative	S. Patriarcia	358		
Turnout			46.0	
Labour hold		Swing		
Labour hold		Swing		

=== Cwmafan (one seat) ===
Cwmafan 1985
Party	Candidate	Votes	%	±%
Labour	Mel John*	1,586		
Alliance	M. Harris	434		
Turnout				
Labour hold		Swing		

=== Fforest Fach (two seats) ===
Fforest Fach 1977
Party	Candidate	Votes	%	±%
Labour	D. Bevan*	1,292		
Labour	Victor Cyril Alexander*	1,193		
Ratepayers	D. Jones	1,115		
Ratepayers	L. Evans	1,091		
Conservative	C. Andrews	767		
Conservative	E. Charles	750		
Plaid Cymru	A. Williams	319		
Plaid Cymru	D. Morton	305		
Communist	B. Lewis	92		
Turnout			37.4	
Labour hold		Swing		
Labour hold		Swing		

=== Ffynone (two seats) ===
Ffynone 1977
Party	Candidate	Votes	%	±%
Conservative	Paul Valerio*	1,840		
Ratepayers	J. Thomas	1,383		
Conservative	G. Ashmole	1,296		
Plaid Cymru	J. Thomas	456		
Liberal	S. Evans	441		
Turnout			63.6	
Conservative hold		Swing		
Ratepayers gain from Conservative		Swing		

=== Glyncorrwg (two seats) ===
Glyncorrwg 1985
Party	Candidate	Votes	%	±%
Labour	T. Jones	1,699		
Labour	R. Eckett	1,180		
Independent Labour	D. Daniels*	1,068		
Independent	Mairwen Goodridge	872		
Turnout			58.8	
Labour hold		Swing		
Labour hold		Swing		

=== Gower No.1 (one seat) ===
Gower No.1 1977
Party	Candidate	Votes	%	±%
Conservative	J. Bartlett	Unopposed		
Conservative gain from Liberal		Swing		

=== Gower No.2 (one seat) ===
Gower No.2 1977
Party	Candidate	Votes	%	±%
Ratepayers	C. Sanders	1,660		
Labour	F. Lord*	1,407		
Turnout			64.5	
Ratepayers gain from Labour		Swing		

=== Gower No.3 (one seat) ===
Gower No.3 1977
Party	Candidate	Votes	%	±%
Conservative	P. Bevan	1,565		
Ratepayers	G. Beynon	1,166		
Labour	M. Thomas	273		
Turnout			47.4	
Conservative gain from Liberal		Swing		

=== Landore (two seats) ===
Landore 1977
Party	Candidate	Votes	%	±%
Labour	D. Cox*	1,286		
Labour	S. John*	1,237		
Ratepayers	J. Lewis	921		
Ratepayers	C. Phillips	917		
Communist	R. Thomas	97		
Turnout			43.4	
Labour hold		Swing		
Labour hold		Swing		

=== Llansamlet (two seats) ===
Llansamlet 1977
Party	Candidate	Votes	%	±%
Labour	L. Penhaligan*	2,471		
Labour	W. Davies	1,931		
Plaid Cymru	C. Phillips	1,181		
Ratepayers	E. James	845		
Plaid Cymru	W. Smith	779		
Ratepayers	C. Stevens	773		
Conservative	J. Edgecombe	661		
Conservative	J. Holmes	560		
Turnout			42.6	
Labour hold		Swing		
Labour hold		Swing		

=== Llwchwr No.1 (one seat) ===
Llwchwr No.1 1977
Party	Candidate	Votes	%	±%
Labour	G. Williams	1,410		
Independent	D. Thomas	829		
Conservative	R. Day	576		
Turnout			62.9	
Labour hold		Swing		

=== Llwchwr No.2 (two seats) ===
Llwchwr No.2 1977
Party	Candidate	Votes	%	±%
Labour	D. Davies*	2,518		
Labour	J. Jones*	1,962		
Plaid Cymru	E. Thomas	1,780		
Turnout			48.6	
Labour hold		Swing		
Labour hold		Swing		

=== Llwchwr No.3 (two seats) ===
Llwchwr No.3 1977
Party	Candidate	Votes	%	±%
Labour	J. Thomas*	1,835		
Labour	D. Turner*	1,697		
Conservative	W. Davies	1,301		
Independent	Cled Morgan	1,176		
Conservative	M. Bevan	1,167		
Plaid Cymru	H. Price	862		
Turnout			64.6	
Labour hold		Swing		
Labour hold		Swing		

=== Margam Central (one seat) ===
Margam Central 1985
Party	Candidate	Votes	%	±%
Labour	J. Rogers	1,642		
Alliance	W. Rees	334		
Turnout				
Labour hold		Swing		

=== Margam North (one seat) ===
Margam North 1985
Party	Candidate	Votes	%	±%
Labour	D. Southall	735		
Independent	W. Charles	561		
Turnout			75.1	
Labour hold		Swing		

=== Margam West (one seat) ===
Margam West 1985
Party	Candidate	Votes	%	±%
Ratepayers	Edward Miles*	1,079		
Labour	B. Davis	743		
Turnout				
Ratepayers hold		Swing		

=== Morriston (two seats) ===
Morriston 1973
Party	Candidate	Votes	%	±%
Labour	P. Evans	1,996		
Labour	S. Havard	1,977		
Ratepayers	C. Hadley	1,810		
Ratepayers	J. Howes	1,295		
Turnout			35.8	
Labour win (new seat)				
Labour win (new seat)				

=== Mumbles (two seats) ===
Mumbles 1973
Party	Candidate	Votes	%	±%
Conservative	A. Chilcot	3,180		
Conservative	M. Jones	3,072		
Labour	L. Neale	1,757		
Turnout			38.2	
Conservative win (new seat)				
Conservative win (new seat)				

=== Neath No.1, South and Briton Ferry (four seats) ===
Neath No.1, South and Briton Ferry 1985
Party	Candidate	Votes	%	±%
Labour	Dillwyn David*	Unopposed		
Labour	David Jeffs*	Unopposed		
Labour	Fred Kingdom*	Unopposed		
Labour	David Roberts*	Unopposed		
Labour hold		Swing		
Labour hold		Swing		
Labour hold		Swing		
Labour hold		Swing		

=== Neath No.2, North, Pontrhydyfen and Tonmawr (two seats) ===
Neath No.2, North, Pontrhydyfen and Tonmawr 1981
Party	Candidate	Votes	%	±%
Labour	Frank Cecil Evans*	2,174		
Labour	M. Jones*	2,062		
Conservative	J. Lloyd	878		
Turnout				
Labour hold		Swing		
Labour hold		Swing		

=== Neath Rural (six seats) ===
Neath Rural 1973
Party	Candidate	Votes	%	±%
Labour	R. Jones	2,905		
Independent	Martin Thomas^{o}	2,534		
Labour	N. Thomas	2,385		
Labour	T. Thomas	2,131		
Plaid Cymru	H. Evans	1,919		
Plaid Cymru	O. Roberts	1,629		
Labour	W. Jones	1,575		
Labour	C. Jones	1,499		
Independent	T. Rees	1,346		
Labour	R. Davies	1,300		
Independent	L. Adams	1,191		
Communist	Glaslyn Morgan	734		
Plaid Cymru	T. Evans	346		
Turnout			67.3	
Labour win (new seat)				
Independent win (new seat)				
Labour win (new seat)				
Labour win (new seat)				
Plaid Cymru win (new seat)				
Plaid Cymru win (new seat)				

=== Neath Rural No.5 (one seat) ===
Neath Rural No.5 1973
Party	Candidate	Votes	%	±%
Labour	D. Hull	1,470		
Independent	R. Rees	1,277		
Plaid Cymru	G. Dawe	273		
Turnout			63.2	
Labour win (new seat)				

=== Penderry (three seats) ===
Penderry 1973
Party	Candidate	Votes	%	±%
Labour	John Allison	3,152		
Labour	T. Jones	3,090		
Labour	G. Thomas	3,032		
Plaid Cymru	D. Reynon	972		
Communist	W. Jones	584		
Communist	B. Lewis	424		
Communist	H. Barrow	280		
Turnout			29.4	
Labour win (new seat)				
Labour win (new seat)				
Labour win (new seat)				

=== Pontardawe No.1 (one seat) ===
Pontardawe No.1 1973
Party	Candidate	Votes	%	±%
Independent	J. Williams	1,151	62.1	
Labour	G. Williams	703	37.9	
Turnout			56.1	
Independent win (new seat)				

=== Pontardawe No.2 (two seats) ===
Pontardawe No.2 1973
Party	Candidate	Votes	%	±%
Labour	J. Maunder	2,694		
Independent	M. Rees	1,948		
Labour	C. Jones	1,836		
Plaid Cymru	M. Mulcahy	1,507		
Independent	R. Jones	1,037		
Turnout			78.9	
Labour win (new seat)				
Labour win (new seat)				

=== Pontardawe No.3 (three seats) ===
Pontardawe No.3 1973
Party	Candidate	Votes	%	±%
Labour	G. Lake	4,702		
Labour	W. Rees	4,615		
Labour	B. Richards	4,464		
Plaid Cymru	R. Davies	3,305		
Turnout			65.4	
Labour win (new seat)				
Labour win (new seat)				
Labour win (new seat)				

=== St Helens (two seats) ===
St Helens 1973
Party	Candidate	Votes	%	±%
Conservative	C. Dilley	1,741		
Conservative	M. Hinds	1,545		
Labour	D. Davies	1,067		
Turnout			49.1	
Conservative win (new seat)				
Conservative win (new seat)				

=== Sketty (two seats) ===
Sketty 1973
Party	Candidate	Votes	%	±%
Conservative	M. Vaughan	5,270		
Conservative	S. Perry	4,819		
Conservative	R. Massey-Shaw	4,477		
Labour	J. Dalton	2,372		
Turnout			47.2	
Conservative win (new seat)				
Conservative win (new seat)				
Conservative win (new seat)				

=== St Johns (two seats) ===
St Johns 1973
Party	Candidate	Votes	%	±%
Labour	A, Morris	Unopposed		
Labour	H. Tabram	Unopposed		
Labour win (new seat)				
Labour win (new seat)				

=== St Thomas (two seats) ===
St Thamas 1973
Party	Candidate	Votes	%	±%
Labour	A. Hare	Unopposed		
Labour	I. Morgan	Unopposed		
Labour win (new seat)				
Labour win (new seat)				

=== Townhill (two seats) ===
Townhill 1973
Party	Candidate	Votes	%	±%
Labour	T. Wignall	1,848		
Labour	T. Evans	1,748		
Conservative	C. McPherson	429		
Turnout			34.4	
Labour win (new seat)				
Labour win (new seat)				

=== Victoria (two seats) ===
Victoria 1973
Party	Candidate	Votes	%	±%
Ratepayers	D. Jenkins	1,390		
Ratepayers	S. Jenkins	1,132		
Labour	A. Taylor	1,051		
Labour	R. Lloyd	852		
Conservative	T. Morgan	477		
Conservative	E. Burrington	329		
Turnout			57.5	
Ratepayers win (new seat)				
Ratepayers win (new seat)				
