= Essex County Council elections =

Local government elections in Essex, England

Essex County Council in England is elected every four years. Since the last boundary changes in 2005, 75 councillors are elected from 70 wards.

== Council elections ==
Year	Conservative	Labour	Liberal Democrats (Note: Includes totals for the predecessors of the Liberal Democrats, the Liberal Party and SDP (both of which participated in the Alliance).)	Reform	Green	UKIP	Independent & Others	Council control after election
Local government reorganisation; council established (97 seats)
1973	50	40	5	–	–	–	2 (Note: Including 1 Residents Association)	Conservative
1977	83	12	2	–	0	–	0	Conservative
New division boundaries (98 seats)
1981	51	32	13	–	0	–	2 (Note: Including 2 Residents Association)	Conservative
1985	45	29	23	–	0	–	0	No overall control
1989	55	25	18	–	0	–	1 (Note: 1 Loughton Residents Association)	Conservative
1993	32	33	32	–	0	–	1	No overall control
Creation of Southend-on-Sea Borough Council and Thurrock Council (79 seats)
1997	40	23	15	–	0	0	1 (Note: 1 Loughton Residents Association)	Conservative
2001	49	19	10	–	0	0	1 (Note: 1 Loughton Residents Association)	Conservative
New division boundaries (75 seats)
2005	52	13	8	–	0	0	2 (Note: 1 Loughton Residents Association, 1 Community Representative)	Conservative
2009	60	1	12	–	0	0	2 (Note: 1 Canvey Island Independent Party, 1 Loughton Residents Association)	Conservative
2013	42	9	9	–	2	9	4 (Note: Including 1 Canvey Island Independent Party, 1 Loughton Residents Association, 1 Tendring First)	Conservative
2017	56	6	7	–	1	0	5 (Note: Including 2 Canvey Island Independent Party, 1 Loughton Residents Association)	Conservative
2021	52	5	8	0	1	0	9 (Note: Including 2 Canvey Island Independent Party, 2 Residents for Uttlesford, 1 Loughton Residents Association, 1 Rochford Residents)	Conservative
New division boundaries (78 seats)
2026 (Note: Delayed from 2025.)	13	1	5	53	1	-	4 (Note: Including 1 Residents for Uttlesford, and 1 The People's Independent Party)	Reform

== County result maps ==
2005 results map

2009 results map

2013 results map

2017 results map

2021 results map

2026 results map

== By-election results ==
=== 1985–1989 ===
Basildon Vange (June 1986) (Labour Hold)

Gray Thurrock (July 1986) (Labour Hold)

Belfairs and Blenheim By-Election: February 1987
Party	Candidate	Votes	%	±%
Alliance	Albert Smulian	2,005	55.6	+2.3
Conservative	Terrence Birdseye	1,289	35.7	−0.2
Labour	Nigel Boorman	314	8.7	−1.1
Majority		716	19.8	+2.5
Turnout		3,608	33.0	−12.2
Alliance hold		Swing	+1.0	

Basildon Crouch By-Election: December 1987
Party	Candidate	Votes	%	±%
Alliance	Francis Bellard	1,423	45.9	+14.1
Conservative	Terence Dove	1,288	41.5	−4.1
Labour	Margaret Davis	391	12.6	−10.0
Majority		135	4.6	
Turnout		3,102	30.0	−6.0
Alliance gain from Conservative		Swing	+9.1	

Maypole By-Election: May 1988
Party	Candidate	Votes	%	±%
SLD	Patricia Pascoe	2,035	42.3	−1.1
Labour	Donald Quinn	1,572	32.7	−6.9
Conservative	Mary Fairhead	1,200	25.0	+8.0
Majority		463	9.6	+5.8
Turnout		4,807	39.0	+2.3
SLD hold		Swing	+2.9	

=== 1989–1993 ===
Old Heath By-Election: 3 May 1990
Party	Candidate	Votes	%	±%
Labour	Christopher Pearson	2,384	40.1	+4.2
Liberal Democrats	Vincent Edkins	2,103	35.4	−0.3
Conservative	Edward Winney	1,039	17.5	−1.9
SDP	John Parrick	416	7.0	+7.0
Majority		281	4.7	+4.5
Turnout		5,942	48.1	+8.6
Labour hold		Swing	+2.3	

Brentwood Central By-Election: June 1990
Party	Candidate	Votes	%	±%
Liberal Democrats	Edgar Davis	2,210	56.0	+21.5
Conservative	John Hutton	1,339	33.9	−14.6
Labour	Francis Keohane	249	6.3	−4.2
Green	Philip Ray	89	2.3	−4.6
SDP	Samuel Ormsby	32	0.8	+0.8
Independent	James Holdsworth	28	0.7	+0.7
Majority		871	22.1	−13.8
Turnout		3,947	40.1	−3.3
Liberal Democrats gain from Conservative		Swing	+18.1	

Dunmow By-Election: 2 May 1991
Party	Candidate	Votes	%	±%
Conservative	David Westcott	2,937	56.4	−5.7
Liberal Democrats	John Gibbs	1,451	27.9	+7.7
Labour	David Cole	817	15.7	−2.0
Majority		1,486	28.5	−13.4
Turnout		5,205	45.1	+7.7
Conservative hold		Swing	−6.7	

Basildon Laindon By-Election: September 1991
Party	Candidate	Votes	%	±%
Conservative	David Walsh	1,780	48.4	+13.1
Labour	Harold Bruce	1,360	32.7	−17.6
Liberal Democrats	Simon Wilson	538	13.0	+4.4
Majority		420	11.4	
Turnout		4,155	33.2	−3.2
Conservative gain from Labour		Swing	+15.4	

Brentwood Hutton By-Election: September 1992
Party	Candidate	Votes	%	±%
Conservative	Alun Thomas	1,872	57.9	−4.9
Liberal Democrats	Katharine Spanton	1,191	36.8	+18.6
Labour	Edward O’Brien	172	5.3	−13.7
Majority		681	21.1	−43.6
Turnout		3,235	26.8	−7.2
Conservative hold		Swing	−11.8	

=== 1993–1997 ===
Loughton St. Marys By-Election: 21 October 1993
Party	Candidate	Votes	%	±%
Labour	Stanley Goodwin	1,891	55.6	+10.5
Conservative	Vernon Davies	870	25.6	−10.0
Liberal Democrats	Nicholas Macy	641	18.8	−0.5
Majority		1,021	30.0	
Turnout		3,402	32.5	
Labour hold		Swing	+10.3	

Tendring Rural West By-Election: 22 September 1994
Party	Candidate	Votes	%	±%
Labour	Christopher Pearson	1,260	35.6	+5.7
Conservative	Roger Lord	1,197	33.9	−1.5
Liberal Democrats	Potter	999	28.3	−5.4
Green	Fox	80	2.3	+2.3
Majority		63	1.8	
Turnout		3,536		
Labour gain from Conservative		Swing	+4.1	

=== 1997–2001 ===
Basildon Westley Heights By-Election: 4 June 1998
Party	Candidate	Votes	%	±%
Labour	Robert Sears	1,717	37.9	+2.2
Conservative	David Walsh	1,573	34.8	−6.0
Liberal Democrats	Geoffery Williams	1,231	27.2	+3.7
Majority		144	3.1	
Turnout		4,521	35.4	
Labour gain from Conservative		Swing		

Loughton St. Johns By-Election: 11 November 1999
Party	Candidate	Votes	%	±%
Labour	Stanley Goodwin	927	48.4	+11.4
Conservative	Colin Finn	527	27.5	+2.0
Loughton Residents	Kay Ellis	404	21.1	−9.8
Liberal Democrats	Christopher Spence	56	2.9	−3.6
Majority		400	20.9	
Turnout		1,914	19.4	
Labour hold		Swing		

=== 2001–2005 ===
Basildon Westley Heights By-Election: 23 September 2004
Party	Candidate	Votes	%	±%
Liberal Democrats	Geoffrey Williams	1,167	45.0	+24.2
Conservative	Sandra Hillier	999	38.5	−3.0
Labour	Jane Dyer	426	16.4	−21.3
Majority		168	6.5	
Turnout		2,592	19.9	
Liberal Democrats gain from Conservative		Swing		

Little Parndon and Town Centre By-Election: 16 December 2004
Party	Candidate	Votes	%	±%
Labour	Mike Danvers	1,082	43.5	−9.1
Conservative	Lee Dangerfield	715	28.7	+0.8
UKIP	Anthony Bennett	264	10.5	+10.5
Liberal Democrats	Christopher Millington	213	8.6	−10.9
Independent	Patricia Bryne	195	7.8	+7.8
English Democrat	Robin Tilbrook	21	0.8	+0.8
Majority		367	14.8	
Turnout		2,487	27.3	
Labour hold		Swing		

=== 2005–2009 ===
Brentwood Rural By-Election: 13 July 2006
Party	Candidate	Votes	%	±%
Conservative	Ann Naylor	2,062	61.5	+11.8
Liberal Democrats	Barry Aspinell	1,150	34.3	+2.3
Labour	Jane Winter	142	4.2	−4.5
Majority		912	27.2	
Turnout		3,354	26.0	
Conservative hold		Swing		

=== 2010–2013 ===
Harlow West By-Election: 5 May 2011
Party	Candidate	Votes	%	±%
Labour	Tony Durcan	5,320	48.4	+22.3
Conservative	Mark Gough	4,564	41.6	+8.3
Liberal Democrats	John Strachan	1,100	10.0	−5.4
Majority		756	6.9	
Turnout		10,984	37.2	
Labour gain from Conservative		Swing		

Percentage changes are since June 2009. At the previous election, the Green Party had received 11.0% and the British National Party received 14.2%.

Chelmsford Central By-Election: 9 June 2011
Party	Candidate	Votes	%	±%
Conservative	Dick Madden	1,496	43.6	+10.0
Liberal Democrats	Graham Pooley	1,323	38.6	−5.9
Labour	Russell Kennedy	610	17.8	+10.1
Majority		173		
Turnout		3,429	29	
Conservative gain from Liberal Democrats		Swing		

Percentage changes are since June 2009, when the British National Party and the Green Party also stood, receiving 6.1% and 8.2%, respectively, of votes cast.

Stock By-Election: 8 September 2011
Party	Candidate	Votes	%	±%
Conservative	Ian Grundy	1,820	59.3	−6.4
UKIP	Jesse Pryke	736	24.1	n/a
Labour	Maurice Austin	273	8.9	+3.7
Liberal Democrats	Marian Elsden	160	5.2	−7.3
Green	Reza Hossain	80	2.6	−6.1
Majority		1,084		
Turnout		3,069	22.4	
Conservative hold		Swing		

Percentage changes are since June 2009. At the previous election, the British National Party received 7.8% of the votes cast

Chelmsford North By-Election: 28 June 2012
Party	Candidate	Votes	%	±%
Liberal Democrats	Stephen Robinson	1,614	42.1	−4.6
Conservative	Robert Pontin	941	24.5	−7.5
Labour	Nastassia Player	711	18.5	+10.7
UKIP	Leslie Retford	435	11.3	n/a
Green	Reza Hossain	134	3.5	−3.8
Majority			6.9	
Turnout		3,835	28.3	
Liberal Democrats hold		Swing		

Percentage changes are since June 2009. At the previous election, British National Party received 6.2%.

=== 2013–2017 ===
Brightlingsea By-Election: 9 October 2014
Party	Candidate	Votes	%	±%
Conservative	Alan Goggin	1,809	33.7	+9.1
UKIP	Anne Poonian	1,642	30.6	+0.2
Liberal Democrats	Gary Scott	1,199	22.3	−4.6
Labour	Carol Carlsson-Browne	524	9.8	−2.7
Green	Beverley Maltby	200	3.7	+0.2
Majority		167	3.1	−0.4
Turnout		5,398	36.5	+4.3
Conservative gain from UKIP		Swing	+4.5	

Bocking By-Election: 5 March 2015
Party	Candidate	Votes	%	±%
Conservative	Stephen Canning	1,071	34.3	+2.1
Labour	Lynn Watson	974	31.2	+1.3
UKIP	Michael Ford	855	27.4	−5.3
Green	John Malam	165	5.3	+2.2
Independent	Walter Sale	58	1.9	N/A
Majority		97	3.1	
Turnout		3,123		
Conservative gain from UKIP		Swing		

Clacton East By-Election: 31 March 2016
Party	Candidate	Votes	%	±%
Holland Residents	Colin Sargeant	1,781	46.8	N/A
UKIP	Benjamin Smith	961	25.3	+0.5
Conservative	Richard Bleach	628	16.5	−10.3
Labour	Christopher Bird	387	10.2	−0.5
Liberal Democrats	Rain Welham-Cobb	49	1.3	−0.4
Majority		820		
Turnout				
Holland Residents gain from Tendring First		Swing		

Basildon Laindon Park and Fryerns By-Election: 9 June 2016
Party	Candidate	Votes	%	±%
UKIP	Frank Ferguson	2,034	42.6	+9.2
Labour	Gavin Callaghan	1,600	33.5	−7.4
Conservative	Gary Maylin	878	18.4	+2.4
Green	Phillip Rackley	264	5.5	+3.1
Majority		434		
Turnout			16.9	
UKIP gain from Labour		Swing		

=== 2017–2021 ===
Clacton East By-Election: 3 October 2019
Party	Candidate	Votes	%	±%
Independent	Mark Stephenson	1,231	36.9	+21.8'"`UNIQ−−ref−0000009A−QINU`"'
Conservative	Chris Amos	1,223	36.6	+5.3
Holland Residents	K.T. King	537	16.1	−24.8'"`UNIQ−−ref−0000009B−QINU`"'
Liberal Democrats	Callum Robertson	140	4.2	+2.4
Labour	Geoff Ely	111	3.3	−6.1
Green	Chris Southall	97	2.9	+1.3
Majority		8	0.2	−9.4
Turnout		3,339	25.3	−10.5
Independent hold		Swing	+8.3	

=== 2021–2026 ===
Rayleigh North By-Election: 3 March 2022
Party	Candidate	Votes	%	±%
Liberal Democrats	James Newport	1,658	57.4	+12.3
Conservative	Simon Smith	929	32.2	−11.8
Independent	Jack Lawmon	164	5.7	N/A
Labour	Lorraine Ridley	137	4.7	−6.2
Majority		729	25.2	+24.1
Turnout		2,892	21.9	−15.6
Registered electors		13,183		
Liberal Democrats hold		Swing	+12.0	

Basildon Laindon Park and Fryerns By-Election: 4 May 2023
Party	Candidate	Votes	%	±%
Labour	Patricia Reid	2,748	49.7	+15.3
Conservative	Terri Sargent	1,890	34.2	+1.2
Green	Oliver McCarthy	445	8.1	N/A
Liberal Democrats	Mike Chandler	444	8.0	+3.9
Majority		858	15.5	+14.1
Turnout		5,588	18.2	–6.9
Registered electors		30,722		
Labour hold		Swing	+7.1	

Harlow South East By-Election: 2 May 2024
Party	Candidate	Votes	%	±%
Conservative	Andrew Johnson	2,008	48.6	–13.1
Labour	Kay Morrison	1,476	35.7	+2.8
UKIP	Dan Long	259	6.3	N/A
Green	Jennifer Steadman	257	6.2	N/A
Liberal Democrats	Christopher Millington	130	3.2	–0.9
Majority		532	12.9	
Turnout		4,163	28.1	–5.4
Registered electors		14,841		
Conservative hold		Swing	–7.9	

Basildon Pitsea By-Election: 4 July 2024
Party	Candidate	Votes	%	±%
Labour	Emma Callaghan	5,959	43.8	+2.0
Conservative	Craig Rimmer	4,360	32.1	–13.8
Independent	Iurie Cojocaru	1,677	12.4	N/A
Liberal Democrats	Phil Jenkins	1,045	7.7	+1.9
TUSC	Jack Huggins	550	4.0	N/A
Majority		1,599	11.8	N/A
Turnout		13,591	41.2	+14.9
Registered electors		32,977		+161
Labour gain from Conservative		Swing	+7.9	

Stock By-Election: 12 December 2024
Party	Candidate	Votes	%	±%
Conservative	Sue Dobson	1,304	46.4	–23.1
Reform	Thomas Allison	977	34.7	N/A
Independent	Paul Clark	160	5.7	N/A
Liberal Democrats	Christine Shaw	156	5.5	−1.3
Labour	Stephen Capper	127	4.5	−5.5
Green	Edward Massey	89	3.2	−2.9
Majority		327	11.6	
Turnout		2,813		
Conservative hold		Swing		

Chelmsford Central By-Election: 1 May 2025
Party	Candidate	Votes	%	±%
Liberal Democrats	David Loxton	2,030	47.5	+4.4
Conservative	Seena Shah	956	22.3	–16.9
Reform	Darren Brooke	869	20.3	N/A
Labour	Penny Richards	227	5.3	
Green	Ronnie Bartlett	196	4.6	
Majority		1,074	25.1	
Turnout		4,278		
Liberal Democrats hold		Swing		

=== 2026–2030 ===
Rayleigh West By-Election: 18 June 2026
Party	Candidate	Votes	%	±%
Conservative	Stuart Belton	1,515	35.4	+17.6
Liberal Democrats	James Newport	1,262	29.5	+2.9
Reform	Denise Martin	1,046	24.4	−15.3
Green	Liam Lonergan	225	5.3	−0.8
Independent	Jamie Burton	117	2.7	+2.7
Labour	Stephen Cooper	85	2.0	−1.9
Independent	Mike Webb	35	0.8	+0.8
Majority		253	5.9	
Turnout		4,285		
Conservative gain from Reform		Swing		
