= 1981 Essex County Council election =

1981 UK local government election

← 1977	7 May 1981	1985 →

All 98 seats to Essex County Council 50 seats needed for a majority

	First party	Second party
Party	Conservative	Labour
Seats won	51	32
Seat change	▼17	▲12
Popular vote	197,573	158,500
Percentage	42.5%	32.7%
Swing	▼19.4%	▲7.5%
	Third party	Fourth party
Party	Liberal	Residents
Seats won	13	2
Seat change	▲11	▲2
Popular vote	91,503	3,680
Percentage	19.7%	0.8%
Swing	▲11.0%	▼0.3%
- Results of the 1981 Essex County Council election.
Council control before election
Conservative
Council control after election
Conservative

The 1981 Essex County Council election was held on 7 May 1981 to elect members of Essex County Council in Essex, England. This was on the same day as other local elections.

== Summary ==
1981 Essex County Council election
Party	Seats	Gains	Losses	Net gain/loss	Seats %	Votes %	Votes	+/−
Conservative	51	0	12	▼32	52.0	42.5	197,461	–19.5
Labour	32	6	0	▲20	32.7	34.1	158,981	+7.5
Liberal	13	6	0	▲11	13.3	19.7	90,891	+10.8
Residents	2	0	0	▲2	2.0	1.2	5,556	+0.1
Independent	0	0	0	Steady	0.0	1.1	5,335	+0.2
SDP	0	0	0	Steady	0.0	0.5	2,097	N/A
Ind. Conservative	0	0	0	Steady	0.0	0.3	1,342	N/A
Ecology	0	0	0	Steady	0.0	0.2	1,122	N/A
Ind. Labour Party	0	0	0	Steady	0.0	0.2	973	N/A
New Britain	0	0	0	Steady	0.0	<0.1	160	N/A
Total	98						462,244	

== Division results ==
=== Basildon ===
Basildon District Summary
Party	Seats	+/-	Votes	%	+/-
Labour	6	▲3	19,752	42.9	+11.9
Conservative	3	▼2	14,059	30.6	–22.0
Residents	1	▲1	3,873	8.4	–1.5
Liberal	0	Steady	7,249	15.8	+11.9
Ind. Conservative	0	Steady	907	2.0	N/A
Ecology	0	Steady	165	0.4	N/A
Total	10	▲2	46,005	41.5	–5.2

Division results

Basildon Crouch
Party	Candidate	Votes	%
Conservative	R. Marshall	1,387	34.0
Labour	R. Reed	990	24.2
Ind. Conservative	F. Stark	907	22.2
Liberal	P. Ferriss	764	18.7
Ecology	C. Oppenheim	35	0.9
Majority		397	9.7
Turnout		4,083	46.3
Registered electors		8,815	
Conservative win (new seat)			

Basildon Fryerns
Party	Candidate	Votes	%
Labour	W. Archibald	2,589	68.4
Conservative	G. Willett	617	16.3
Liberal	M. Chambers	499	13.2
Residents	P. Baker	80	2.1
Majority		1,972	52.1
Turnout		3,785	34.5
Registered electors		10,968	
Labour win (new seat)			

Basildon Gloucester Park
Party	Candidate	Votes	%
Labour	J. Costello	3,691	67.6
Liberal	J. White	952	17.4
Conservative	R. Sheridan	819	23.6
Majority		2,739	50.1
Turnout		5,462	43.4
Registered electors		12,585	
Labour win (new seat)			

Basildon Laindon
Party	Candidate	Votes	%
Labour	R. Bolt	1,490	42.9
Liberal	R. Payne	1,163	33.5
Conservative	E. Lane	819	23.6
Majority		327	9.4
Turnout		3,472	40.9
Registered electors		8,479	
Labour win (new seat)			

Basildon Pitsea
Party	Candidate	Votes	%
Labour	R. Oliver	3,151	61.7
Conservative	E. Dines	1,370	26.8
Liberal	R. Hawksworth	589	11.5
Majority		1,791	34.9
Turnout		5,110	37.9
Registered electors		13,475	
Labour win (new seat)			

Basildon Vange
Party	Candidate	Votes	%
Labour	G. Miller	3,178	65.3
Conservative	A. White	949	19.5
Liberal	J. Bell	613	12.6
Ecology	G. Thomas	130	2.7
Majority		2,229	45.8
Turnout		4,870	37.2
Registered electors		13,100	
Labour win (new seat)			

Basildon Westley Heights
Party	Candidate	Votes	%
Labour	C. Maxey	2,080	43.9
Conservative	M. Ilesley	1,591	33.6
Liberal	L. Williams	1,062	22.4
Majority		489	10.3
Turnout		4,733	44.1
Registered electors		10,727	
Labour win (new seat)			

Billericay North
Party	Candidate	Votes	%
Conservative	L. Greenfield	2,600	53.1
Residents	T. Stansfield	1,917	39.1
Labour	T. Wilson	381	7.8
Majority		683	13.9
Turnout		4,898	47.8
Registered electors		10,240	
Conservative win (new seat)			

Billericay South
Party	Candidate	Votes	%
Residents	H. Wilkins	1,876	34.9
Conservative	G. Jones	1,764	32.8
Labour	C. Lynch	913	17.0
Liberal	D. Chapman	826	15.4
Majority		112	2.1
Turnout		5,379	42.9
Registered electors		12,553	
Residents win (new seat)			

Wickford
Party	Candidate	Votes	%
Conservative	E. Mickleborough	2,143	50.9
Labour	W. Primmer	1,289	30.6
Liberal	G. Palmer	781	18.5
Majority		854	20.3
Turnout		4,213	42.1
Registered electors		9,998	
Conservative win (new seat)			

=== Braintree ===
Braintree District Summary
Party	Seats	+/-	Votes	%	+/-
Conservative	5	▼2	16,196	45.1	–16.7
Labour	1	▲1	13,509	37.6	+10.1
Liberal	1	▲1	6,202	17.3	+7.1
Total	7	Steady	35,907	43.4	+4.0

Division results

Bocking
Party	Candidate	Votes	%	±%
Conservative	O. Sebag-Montefiore	2,208	39.0	–12.0
Labour	J. Hall	2,177	38.4	+5.6
Liberal	J. Ross	1,279	22.6	+6.4
Majority		31	0.5	–17.7
Turnout		5,664	48.0	+6.2
Registered electors		11,802		
Conservative hold		Swing	▼8.8	

Braintree East
Party	Candidate	Votes	%
Conservative	Robert Dixon-Smith	2,167	39.3
Labour	M. Oliver	1,774	32.2
Liberal	P. Keeling	1,571	28.5
Majority		393	7.1
Turnout		5,512	45.1
Registered electors		12,233	
Conservative win (new seat)			

Braintree West
Party	Candidate	Votes	%
Liberal	D. Grice	2,166	37.6
Conservative	J. Amies	2,122	36.8
Labour	M. Shirvington	1,473	25.6
Majority		44	0.8
Turnout		5,761	46.9
Registered electors		12,295	
Liberal win (new seat)			

Halstead
Party	Candidate	Votes	%	±%
Conservative	O. Joyce	2,923	57.8	–15.9
Labour	R. Dixey	2,131	42.2	+15.9
Majority		792	15.7	–31.6
Turnout		5,054	42.0	+0.6
Registered electors		12,037		
Conservative hold		Swing	▼15.9	

Hedingham
Party	Candidate	Votes	%	±%
Conservative	G. Waterer	2,826	64.8	N/A
Labour	W. Alston	1,533	35.2	N/A
Majority		1,293	29.7	N/A
Turnout		4,359	39.8	N/A
Registered electors		10,946		
Conservative hold		Swing	N/A	

Witham Northern
Party	Candidate	Votes	%
Labour	J. Lyon	2,323	44.1
Conservative	J. Allan	1,757	33.4
Liberal	A. Slowman	1,186	22.5
Majority		566	10.7
Turnout		5,266	43.5
Registered electors		12,116	
Labour win (new seat)			

Witham Southern
Party	Candidate	Votes	%
Conservative	D. Willetts	2,193	51.1
Labour	C. Foy	2,098	48.9
Majority		95	2.2
Turnout		4,291	38.2
Registered electors		11,241	
Conservative win (new seat)			

=== Brentwood ===
Brentwood District Summary
Party	Seats	+/-	Votes	%	+/-
Conservative	5	▲1	13,144	52.2	–18.2
Labour	0	Steady	6,176	24.5	–1.6
Liberal	0	Steady	5,871	23.3	+20.1
Total	5	▲1	25,191	45.8	+1.7

Division results

Brentwood Central
Party	Candidate	Votes	%	±%
Conservative	M. Hutton	2,262	48.2	–17.7
Liberal	A. Longman	1,262	24.3	+13.4
Labour	D. Edwards	985	18.9	+4.3
Majority		1,000	18.6	–31.8
Turnout		4,509	45.7	+5.2
Registered electors		10,270		
Conservative hold		Swing	▼15.6	

Brentwood Hutton
Party	Candidate	Votes	%	±%
Conservative	A. Donnelly	2,956	56.8	–24.1
Liberal	O. Hall	1,262	24.3	N/A
Labour	D. Wacey	985	18.9	+1.2
Majority		1,694	32.6	–30.6
Turnout		5,203	44.1	+2.2
Registered electors		11,790		
Conservative hold				

Brentwood North
Party	Candidate	Votes	%	±%
Conservative	L. Jago	2,230	52.3	–26.3
Labour	L. Southgate	1,044	24.5	+3.1
Liberal	N. Amor	987	23.2	N/A
Majority		1,186	27.8	−29.4
Turnout		4,261	44.9	+3.5
Registered electors		9,486		
Conservative hold		Swing	▼14.7	

Brentwood Rural
Party	Candidate	Votes	%
Conservative	D. Jones	3,106	57.2
Liberal	R. Sullivan	1,581	29.1
Labour	L. Nicholas	742	13.7
Majority		1,525	28.1
Turnout		5,429	45.1
Registered electors		12,026	
Conservative win (new seat)			

Brentwood South
Party	Candidate	Votes	%	±%
Conservative	J. Hayward	2,590	44.7	
Labour	J. Reddell	2,420	41.8	
Liberal	M. Dwyer	779	13.5	
Majority		170	2.9	
Turnout		5,789	50.6	
Registered electors		11,439		
Conservative hold		Swing		

=== Castle Point ===
Castle Point District Summary
Party	Seats	+/-	Votes	%	+/-
Conservative	4	▼1	11,770	46.8	–24.5
Labour	2	▲2	8,280	32.9	+7.4
Liberal	0	Steady	3,628	14.4	+11.2
SDP	0	Steady	1,460	5.8	N/A
Total	6	▲1	25,138	39.4	+0.9

Division results

Benfleet
Party	Candidate	Votes	%	±%
Conservative	J. Pike	2,223	53.1	
Labour	C. Prentice	1,022	24.4	
Liberal	T. Atkin	939	22.4	
Majority		1,201	28.7	
Turnout		4,184	42.6	
Registered electors		9,827		
Conservative hold		Swing		

Canvey Island East
Party	Candidate	Votes	%	±%
Labour	D. Nisbet	1,782	40.5	+11.1
Conservative	W. Ashworth	1,707	38.8	–31.8
SDP	A. Bennett	912	20.7	N/A
Majority		75	1.7	N/A
Turnout		4,401	33.3	+3.8
Registered electors		13,215		
Labour gain from Conservative		Swing	▲21.5	

Canvey Island West
Party	Candidate	Votes	%	±%
Labour	D. Shaw	2,081	47.4	+11.3
Conservative	F. Wood	1,345	30.7	–16.2
SDP	M. Perrin	548	12.5	N/A
Liberal	N. Chitty	413	9.4	–7.6
Majority		736	16.8	N/A
Turnout		4,387	34.9	–3.5
Registered electors		12,571		
Labour gain from Conservative		Swing	▲13.8	

Great Tarpots
Party	Candidate	Votes	%
Conservative	W. Brum	1,700	43.8
Labour	G. Auvache	1,495	38.5
Liberal	R. Michel	684	17.6
Majority		205	5.3
Turnout		3,879	39.4
Registered electors		9,846	
Conservative win (new seat)			

Hadleigh
Party	Candidate	Votes	%	±%
Conservative	R. Williams	2,607	61.8	
Liberal	D. Newton	860	20.4	
Labour	P. Ottino	754	17.9	
Majority		1,747	41.4	
Turnout		4,221	46.4	
Registered electors		9,099		
Conservative hold		Swing		

Thundersley
Party	Candidate	Votes	%	±%
Conservative	J. Meggison	2,188	53.8	
Labour	J. Amey	1,146	28.2	
Liberal	W. Penny	732	18.0	
Majority		1,042	25.6	
Turnout		4,066	43.7	
Registered electors		9,295		
Conservative hold		Swing		

=== Chelmsford ===
Chelmsford District Summary
Party	Seats	+/-	Votes	%	+/-
Liberal	5	▲5	20,288	42.9	+19.2
Conservative	4	▼4	19,431	41.1	–16.9
Labour	0	Steady	7,539	15.9	–1.7
Independent	0	Steady	42	0.1	–0.5
Total	9	▲1	47,300	45.8	+2.9

Division results

Broomfield & Writtle
Party	Candidate	Votes	%
Conservative	B. Platt	2,635	51.6
Liberal	J. Gumbleton	1,372	26.9
Labour	J. Bliss	1,102	21.6
Majority		1,263	24.7
Turnout		5,109	48.8
Registered electors		10,476	
Conservative win (new seat)			

Chelmsford East
Party	Candidate	Votes	%	±%
Liberal	A. Knight	3,041	53.7	+12.2
Conservative	J. Aberdour	1,952	34.5	–16.8
Labour	C. Playford	668	11.8	+4.6
Majority		1,089	19.2	N/A
Turnout		5,661	44.3	–6.7
Registered electors		12,784		
Liberal gain from Conservative		Swing	▲14.5	

Chelmsford North
Party	Candidate	Votes	%	±%
Liberal	T. Smith-Hughes	2,828	56.4	+41.9
Conservative	E. King	1,309	26.1	–20.3
Labour	S. McEvaddy	875	17.5	–21.6
Majority		1,519	30.3	N/A
Turnout		5,012	48.9	+8.0
Registered electors		10,258		
Liberal gain from Conservative		Swing	▲31.1	

Chelmsford South
Party	Candidate	Votes	%	±%
Liberal	R. Harmer	2,488	45.6	+33.9
Conservative	E. Coker	2,139	39.2	–30.5
Labour	A. Longden	827	15.2	–3.4
Majority		349	6.4	N/A
Turnout		5,454	49.3	+12.1
Registered electors		11,057		
Liberal gain from Conservative		Swing	▲32.2	

Chelmsford West
Party	Candidate	Votes	%	±%
Liberal	D. Ridgewell	2,530	50.5	+11.9
Conservative	P. Martin	1,389	27.7	–16.9
Labour	C. Cronin	1,095	21.8	+5.0
Majority		1,141	22.8	N/A
Turnout		5,014	50.3	+8.7
Registered electors		9,971		
Liberal gain from Conservative		Swing	▲14.4	

Great Baddow
Party	Candidate	Votes	%	±%
Liberal	J. Beard	2,469	49.4	
Conservative	C. Ince	1,858	37.2	
Labour	D. Shinn	631	12.6	
Independent	T. Wilson	42	0.8	
Majority		611	12.2	
Turnout		5,000	47.9	
Registered electors		10,441		
Liberal gain from Conservative		Swing		

Springfield
Party	Candidate	Votes	%
Conservative	H. How	2,587	46.3
Liberal	J. Burgess	2,153	38.6
Labour	S. Clark	844	15.1
Majority		434	7.8
Turnout		5,584	44.8
Registered electors		12,478	
Conservative win (new seat)			

Stock
Party	Candidate	Votes	%
Conservative	P. White	3,154	53.5
Liberal	E. Clark	1,709	29.0
Labour	K. Bliss	1,033	17.5
Majority		1,445	24.5
Turnout		5,896	41.8
Registered electors		14,116	
Conservative win (new seat)			

Woodham Ferrers & Danbury
Party	Candidate	Votes	%
Conservative	D. Chatfield	2,408	52.7
Liberal	M. Bender	1,698	37.2
Labour	K. Skeates	464	10.2
Majority		710	15.5
Turnout		4,570	38.8
Registered electors		11,780	
Conservative win (new seat)			

=== Colchester ===
Colchester District Summary
Party	Seats	+/-	Votes	%	+/-
Conservative	5	▼2	19,456	49.8	–18.2
Labour	4	▲3	16,431	42.0	+14.3
Liberal	0	Steady	2,646	6.8	+2.4
Ecology	0	Steady	559	1.4	N/A
Total	9	▲1	39,092	39.1	–1.8

Division results

Constable
Party	Candidate	Votes	%
Conservative	G. Hickson	2,947	70.2
Labour	J. Kent	1,253	29.8
Majority		1,694	40.4
Turnout		4,200	41.9
Registered electors		10,021	
Conservative win (new seat)			

Drury
Party	Candidate	Votes	%
Conservative	D. Lamberth	2,988	51.0
Liberal	Martin Hunt	1,738	29.7
Labour	C. Graves	1,128	19.3
Majority		1,250	21.4
Turnout		5,854	46.5
Registered electors		12,600	
Conservative win (new seat)			

Maypole
Party	Candidate	Votes	%
Labour	J. Fraser	2,167	52.8
Conservative	W. Foster	1,027	25.0
Liberal	William Spyvee	908	22.1
Majority		1,140	27.8
Turnout		4,102	35.3
Registered electors		11,636	
Labour win (new seat)			

Mersea & Stanway
Party	Candidate	Votes	%
Conservative	R. Fairhead	3,247	71.0
Labour	K. Taylor	1,035	22.6
Ecology	G. Cox	292	6.4
Majority		2,212	48.4
Turnout		4,574	39.5
Registered electors		11,589	
Conservative win (new seat)			

Old Heath
Party	Candidate	Votes	%
Labour	J. Coombes	2,707	60.7
Conservative	A. Steggall	1,489	33.4
Ecology	M. Baker	267	6.0
Majority		1,218	27.3
Turnout		4,463	39.7
Registered electors		11,255	
Labour win (new seat)			

Park
Party	Candidate	Votes	%
Conservative	E. Gawthrop	2,196	51.4
Labour	J. Hills	2,073	48.6
Majority		123	2.9
Turnout		4,269	42.0
Registered electors		10,162	
Conservative win (new seat)			

Parsons Heath
Party	Candidate	Votes	%
Labour	Kent	2,238	52.2
Conservative	Roots	2,046	47.8
Majority		192	4.5
Turnout		4,284	41.5
Registered electors		10,312	
Labour win (new seat)			

Tiptree division
Party	Candidate	Votes	%
Conservative	F. Thornton	2,077	60.7
Labour	T. Morecroft	1,346	39.3
Majority		731	21.4
Turnout		3,353	30.7
Registered electors		11,148	
Conservative win (new seat)			

Wivenhoe St Andrew division
Party	Candidate	Votes	%
Labour	H. Bryan	2,485	63.3
Conservative	E. Jennings	1,439	36.8
Majority		1,046	26.7
Turnout		3,924	35.4
Registered electors		11,100	
Labour win (new seat)			

=== Epping Forest ===
Epping Forest District Summary
Party	Seats	+/-	Votes	%	+/-
Conservative	5	▼4	19,317	51.1	–20.9
Labour	2	▲2	12,096	32.0	+7.5
Residents	1	▲1	1,683	4.5	N/A
Liberal	0	Steady	4,527	12.0	+8.5
Ecology	0	Steady	159	0.4	N/A
Total	8	▼1	37,782	43.0	+2.8

Division results

Buckhurst Hill
Party	Candidate	Votes	%	±%
Conservative	B. Cox	2,523	58.0	
Labour	B. Mooney	972	22.4	
Liberal	G. Chapman	853	19.6	
Majority		1,551	35.7	
Turnout		4,348	40.4	
Registered electors		10,751		
Conservative hold		Swing		

Chigwell
Party	Candidate	Votes	%	±%
Conservative	S. Barnett	2,347	69.7	
Liberal	G. West	521	15.5	
Labour	L. Timson	499	14.8	
Majority		1,826	54.2	
Turnout		3,367	37.0	
Registered electors		9,112		
Conservative hold		Swing		

Epping
Party	Candidate	Votes	%	±%
Conservative	R. Daniels	2,822	53.8	
Labour	M. Jackson	1,440	27.4	
Liberal	R. Eveling	828	15.8	
Ecology	R. Boenke	159	3.0	
Majority		1,382	26.3	
Turnout		5,249	43.4	
Registered electors		12,084		
Conservative hold		Swing		

Loughton St. John's
Party	Candidate	Votes	%
Labour	F. Davis	1,937	47.4
Conservative	D. Brady	1,704	41.7
Liberal	W. Randall	445	10.9
Majority		233	5.7
Turnout		4,086	39.2
Registered electors		10,419	
Labour win (new seat)			

Loughton St. Mary's
Party	Candidate	Votes	%
Residents	H. Kleyn	1,683	34.8
Conservative	L. Welch	1,573	32.5
Labour	L. Baddock	1,300	26.9
Liberal	L. Martin	284	5.9
Majority		110	2.3
Turnout		4,840	47.0
Registered electors		10,305	
Residents win (new seat)			

North Weald & Nazeing
Party	Candidate	Votes	%
Conservative	G. Padfield	2,793	61.8
Labour	D. Grenville-Brown	1,144	25.3
Liberal	T. Owen	582	12.9
Majority		1,649	36.5
Turnout		4,519	45.2
Registered electors		9,987	
Conservative win (new seat)			

Ongar
Party	Candidate	Votes	%
Conservative	J. Martin	3,035	54.7
Labour	F. Davy	1,501	27.0
Liberal	D. Jacobs	1,014	18.3
Majority		1,534	27.6
Turnout		5,550	49.4
Registered electors		11,245	
Conservative win (new seat)			

Waltham Abbey
Party	Candidate	Votes	%	±%
Labour	C. Hewins	3,303	56.7	+10.3
Conservative	G. Jailler	2,520	43.3	–10.3
Majority		783	13.4	N/A
Turnout		5,823	41.8	–2.3
Registered electors		13,939		
Labour gain from Conservative		Swing	▲10.8	

=== Harlow ===
Harlow District Summary
Party	Seats	+/-	Votes	%	+/-
Labour	5	▲1	14,436	58.5	+9.4
Conservative	0	▼1	5,119	20.8	–17.7
Liberal	0	Steady	4,716	19.1	+7.1
Independent	0	Steady	389	1.6	+1.2
Total	5	Steady	24,660	42.0	+2.9

Division results

Great Parndon
Party	Candidate	Votes	%	±%
Labour	S. Warner	2,510	53.7	+7.9
Conservative	L. Atkins	1,161	24.9	–17.3
Liberal	L. Swanton	610	13.1	+1.1
Independent	C. Johnson	389	8.3	N/A
Majority		1,349	28.9	+25.3
Turnout		4,670	39.1	+0.3
Registered electors		11,941		
Labour hold		Swing	▲12.6	

Harlow & Mark Hall
Party	Candidate	Votes	%	±%
Labour	S. Anderson	2,589	58.7	+9.9
Conservative	P. Moulds	1,370	28.0	–17.2
Liberal	P. Ramsay	927	19.0	+7.2
Majority		1,219	24.9	N/A
Turnout		4,886	44.5	–2.1
Registered electors		10,983		
Labour gain from Conservative		Swing	▲13.6	

Harlow Common
Party	Candidate	Votes	%	±%
Labour	W. Gibson	2,887	58.7	+4.4
Liberal	E. Scammell	1,173	23.8	+15.3
Conservative	M. Tombs	862	17.5	–17.4
Majority		1,714	34.8	+15.4
Turnout		4,922	42.8	+4.0
Registered electors		11,491		
Labour hold		Swing	▼5.5	

Little Parndon & Town Centre
Party	Candidate	Votes	%	±%
Labour	E. Morris	2,878	60.3	+9.6
Liberal	J. Bastick	1,007	21.1	+6.6
Conservative	E. Atkins	885	18.6	–16.2
Majority		1,871	39.2	+23.2
Turnout		4,770	41.6	+2.8
Registered electors		11,470		
Labour hold		Swing	▲1.5	

Netteswellbury
Party	Candidate	Votes	%	±%
Labour	J. Desormeaux	3,572	66.0	+10.1
Liberal	S. Ward	999	18.5	+4.3
Conservative	P. Harries	841	15.5	–14.4
Majority		2,573	47.5	+21.5
Turnout		5,412	42.1	+3.2
Registered electors		12,856		
Labour hold		Swing	▲2.9	

=== Maldon ===
Maldon District Summary
Party	Seats	+/-	Votes	%	+/-
Conservative	3	Steady	7,218	44.9	–20.0
Liberal	0	Steady	5,114	31.8	+23.6
Labour	0	Steady	3,756	23.3	+0.1
Total	3	Steady	16,088	45.5	+1.1

Division results

Maldon
Party	Candidate	Votes	%	±%
Conservative	K. Nolan	2,257	42.0	–12.8
Liberal	P. Lacey	1,702	31.6	+13.4
Labour	C. Tait	1,421	26.4	–0.6
Majority		555	10.3	–17.4
Turnout		5,380	47.4	+6.7
Registered electors		11,360		
Conservative hold		Swing	▼13.1	

Southminster
Party	Candidate	Votes	%	±%
Conservative	D. Garston	2,230	46.2	N/A
Labour	R. Brown	1,610	33.4	N/A
Liberal	N. Baker	986	20.4	N/A
Majority		620	6.9	N/A
Turnout		4,826	43.3	N/A
Registered electors		12,437		
Conservative hold		Swing	N/A	

Tollesbury
Party	Candidate	Votes	%	±%
Conservative	E. Peel	2,731	46.4	–26.8
Liberal	J. Tilley	2,426	41.2	+34.5
Labour	M. Holland	725	12.3	–7.8
Majority		305	5.2	–47.9
Turnout		5,882	50.8	+2.7
Registered electors		11,576		
Conservative hold		Swing	▼30.7	

=== Rochford ===
Rochford District Summary
Party	Seats	+/-	Votes	%	+/-
Conservative	3	▼2	11,154	51.8	–10.5
Labour	1	▲1	6,746	31.4	+12.1
Liberal	1	▲1	2,686	12.5	+8.0
Independent	0	Steady	928	4.3	–9.6
Total	5	Steady	21,514	38.3	–1.6

Division results

Rayleigh North
Party	Candidate	Votes	%	±%
Liberal	R. Boyd	2,120	43.9	+29.0
Conservative	R. Foster	2,007	41.6	–25.8
Labour	C. Barnaby	702	14.5	–3.2
Majority		113	2.3	N/A
Turnout		4,829	45.4	+6.9
Registered electors		10,626		
Liberal gain from Conservative		Swing	▲27.4	

Rayleigh South
Party	Candidate	Votes	%	±%
Conservative	T. Murray	1,876	41.8	–9.7
Labour	S. Andre	1,118	24.9	+10.7
Independent	S. Silva	928	20.7	–5.6
Liberal	D. Ward	566	12.6	+4.6
Majority		758	16.9	–8.3
Turnout		4,488	38.0	–3.7
Registered electors		11,812		
Conservative hold		Swing	▼10.2	

Rochford North
Party	Candidate	Votes	%	±%
Conservative	T. Fawell	2,505	63.7	+9.5
Labour	M. Weir	1,429	36.3	N/A
Majority		1,076	27.4	+19.1
Turnout		3,934	35.1	–0.6
Registered electors		11,812		
Conservative hold		Swing	N/A	

Rochford South
Party	Candidate	Votes	%	±%
Labour	D. Weir	2,118	50.3	+16.0
Conservative	D. Wood	2,090	49.7	–16.0
Majority		28	0.7	N/A
Turnout		4,208	40.0	–4.3
Registered electors		10,507		
Labour gain from Conservative		Swing	▲16.0	

Rochford West
Party	Candidate	Votes	%	±%
Conservative	J. Jones	2,676	66.0	–6.3
Labour	A. Malcolm	1,379	34.0	+6.3
Majority		1,297	32.0	–12.7
Turnout		4,055	35.4	–4.4
Registered electors		11,456		
Conservative hold		Swing	▼6.3	

=== Southend ===
Southend District Summary
Party	Seats	+/-	Votes	%	+/-
Conservative	6	▼5	22,345	43.9	–20.6
Liberal	4	▲2	15,305	30.1	+10.5
Labour	1	▲1	11,775	23.1	+7.3
Independent	0	Steady	986	1.9	+1.8
Ind. Conservative	0	Steady	305	0.6	N/A
New Britain	0	Steady	160	0.3	N/A
Total	11	▼2	50,876	40.5	+2.1

Division results

Belfairs & Blenheim
Party	Candidate	Votes	%
Conservative	N. Clarke	2,183	53.3
Liberal	J. Hugill	1,254	30.6
Labour	H. Hurst	657	16.0
Majority		929	22.7
Turnout		4,094	37.1
Registered electors		11,047	
Conservative win (new seat)			

Chalkwell
Party	Candidate	Votes	%	±%
Conservative	N. Harris	2,316	50.6	
Liberal	J. Keith	1,854	40.5	
Labour	T. Hughes	404	8.8	
Majority		462	10.1	
Turnout		4,574	41.3	
Registered electors		11,080		
Conservative hold		Swing		

Eastwood
Party	Candidate	Votes	%	±%
Liberal	N. Goodman	1,784	46.0	
Conservative	J. Innocent	1,656	42.7	
Labour	A. Dunn	436	11.2	
Majority		128	3.3	
Turnout		3,876	37.7	
Registered electors		10,276		
Liberal gain from Conservative		Swing		

Leigh
Party	Candidate	Votes	%	±%
Liberal	A. Crystall	2,719	49.2	
Conservative	D. Roach	2,501	45.2	
Labour	L. Davidson	274	5.0	
Independent	M. Roffey	35	0.6	
Majority		218	3.9	
Turnout		5,529	49.5	
Registered electors		11,177		
Liberal hold		Swing		

Milton
Party	Candidate	Votes	%
Conservative	D. Wilson	1,700	39.7
Labour	J. Hodgkins	1,407	32.8
Independent	M. Burstin	872	20.4
Ind. Conservative	A. Anderson Wright	305	7.1
Majority		293	6.8
Turnout		4,284	35.0
Registered electors		12,254	
Conservative win (new seat)			

Prittlewell
Party	Candidate	Votes	%	±%
Liberal	J. Sargent	2,391	46.8	
Conservative	P. Bone	1,794	35.1	
Labour	B. White	924	18.1	
Majority		597	11.7	
Turnout		5,109	41.8	
Registered electors		12,233		
Liberal hold		Swing		

Shoebury
Party	Candidate	Votes	%	±%
Conservative	D. Cotgrove	2,126	45.9	
Labour	R. Copley	1,708	36.9	
Liberal	B. Ayling	718	15.5	
Independent	H. Connigale	79	1.7	
Majority		418	9.0	
Turnout		4,631	41.3	
Registered electors		11,200		
Conservative hold		Swing		

Southchurch
Party	Candidate	Votes	%
Conservative	D. Garston	2,230	46.2
Labour	R. Brown	1,610	33.4
Liberal	N. Baker	986	20.4
Majority		620	12.8
Turnout		4,826	41.3
Registered electors		11,689	
Conservative win (new seat)			

Thorpe
Party	Candidate	Votes	%	±%
Conservative	H. Hill	2,545	60.9	
Labour	L. Crabtree	977	23.4	
Liberal	V. Macfarlane	500	12.0	
New Britain	J. Webb	160	3.8	
Majority		1,568	37.5	
Turnout		4,182	37.5	
Registered electors		11,215		
Conservative hold		Swing		

Victoria
Party	Candidate	Votes	%
Labour	R. Kennedy	2,160	50.7
Conservative	A. Fuller	1,171	27.5
Liberal	J. Palmer	927	21.8
Majority		989	23.2
Turnout		4,258	36.4
Registered electors		11,708	
Labour win (new seat)			

Westborough
Party	Candidate	Votes	%
Liberal	M. Lubel	2,172	39.4
Conservative	R. Marriott	2,123	38.5
Labour	K. Leaman	1,218	22.1
Majority		49	0.9
Turnout		5,513	46.5
Registered electors		11,846	
Liberal win (new seat)			

=== Tendring ===
Tendring District Summary
Party	Seats	+/-	Votes	%	+/-
Conservative	4	▼4	16,779	44.1	–24.6
Labour	2	▲2	10,939	28.8	+6.2
Liberal	2	▲2	8,955	23.6	+15.0
SDP	0	Steady	574	1.5	N/A
Independent	0	Steady	486	1.3	N/A
Ecology	0	Steady	142	0.4	N/A
Ind. Conservative	0	Steady	130	0.3	N/A
Total	8	Steady	32,450	37.3	±0.0

Division results

Brightlingsea
Party	Candidate	Votes	%	±%
Liberal	Thomas Dale	2,543	51.4	+20.0
Conservative	R. Petherick	1,564	31.6	–21.2
Labour	B. Westover	688	13.9	–1.9
Independent	E. Ketley	152	3.1	N/A
Majority		979	19.8	N/A
Turnout		4,947	44.2	+3.4
Registered electors		11,180		
Liberal gain from Conservative		Swing	▲20.6	

Clacton East
Party	Candidate	Votes	%
Conservative	J. Story	2,858	55.5
Liberal	T. Jeffrey	1,484	28.8
Labour	L. Jacobs	812	15.8
Majority		1,374	26.7
Turnout		5,154	42.9
Registered electors		12,028	
Conservative win (new seat)			

Clacton North
Party	Candidate	Votes	%
Liberal	G. Waterfield	1,657	38.7
Conservative	C. Jessop	1,328	31.0
Labour	N. Jacobs	1,164	27.2
Ind. Conservative	T. Staigl	130	3.0
Majority		329	7.7
Turnout		4,279	41.9
Registered electors		10,605	
Liberal win (new seat)			

Clacton West
Party	Candidate	Votes	%
Labour	R. Smith	1,965	41.0
Conservative	H. Harvey-Williams	1,739	36.3
Liberal	R. Huse	1,083	22.6
Majority		226	4.7
Turnout		4,787	39.3
Registered electors		12,174	
Labour win (new seat)			

Frinton & Walton
Party	Candidate	Votes	%	±%
Conservative	D. Rex	3,238	60.4	–24.6
Liberal	R. Hamilton	1,191	22.2	+16.0
Labour	T. Rowlands	935	17.4	+8.6
Majority		2,047	38.2	–38.0
Turnout		5,364	41.8	+6.8
Registered electors		12,839		
Conservative hold		Swing	▼20.3	

Harwich
Party	Candidate	Votes	%	±%
Labour	R. Knight	2,414	45.3	+18.1
Conservative	W. Bleakley	2,150	40.4	–32.4
SDP	G. Turner	574	10.8	N/A
Independent	D. Pallett	187	3.5	N/A
Majority		264	5.0	N/A
Turnout		5,325	46.6	+9.2
Registered electors		11,418		
Labour gain from Conservative		Swing	▲25.3	

Tendring Rural East
Party	Candidate	Votes	%
Conservative	C. Lumber	2,059	59.8
Labour	I. Bayles Kay	1,382	40.2
Majority		677	19.7
Turnout		3,441	34.7
Registered electors		9,923	
Conservative win (new seat)			

Tendring Rural West
Party	Candidate	Votes	%
Conservative	H. Varney	1,843	39.1
Labour	P. Shearman	1,579	33.5
Liberal	R. Taylor	997	21.2
Independent	S. Rhodes	147	3.1
Ecology	J. Boud	142	3.0
Majority		264	5.6
Turnout		4,708	45.4
Registered electors		10,365	
Conservative win (new seat)			

=== Thurrock ===
Thurrock District Summary
Party	Seats	+/-	Votes	%	+/-
Labour	8	▲4	22,054	63.5	+22.0
Conservative	0	▼5	10,633	30.6	–18.2
Ind. Labour Party	0	Steady	973	2.8	N/A
Liberal	0	Steady	885	2.6	–5.3
Ecology	0	Steady	97	0.3	N/A
SDP	0	Steady	63	0.2	N/A
Total	8	▼1	34,705	35.3	–0.3

Division results

Chadwell
Party	Candidate	Votes	%	±%
Labour	G. Watts	3,020	75.8	
Conservative	G. Law	964	24.2	
Majority		2,056	51.6	
Turnout		3,984	32.8	
Registered electors		12,159		
Labour hold		Swing		

Corringham
Party	Candidate	Votes	%	±%
Labour	B. Theobald	2,369	61.2	
Conservative	L. Moir	1,504	38.8	
Majority		865	22.3	
Turnout		3,873	36.6	
Registered electors		10,569		
Labour gain from Conservative		Swing		

Grays Thurrock
Party	Candidate	Votes	%	±%
Labour	T. Codley	2,269	45.1	
Conservative	D. Dimond	2,090	41.6	
Liberal	A. Senior	604	12.0	
SDP	S. Ahmed	63	1.3	
Majority		179	3.6	
Turnout		5,026	40.3	
Registered electors		12,480		
Labour gain from Conservative		Swing		

Orsett & Stiffod
Party	Candidate	Votes	%	±%
Labour	J. Pollard	2,703	52.8	
Conservative	L. Green	2,417	47.2	
Majority		286	5.6	
Turnout		5,120	44.8	
Registered electors		11,416		
Labour gain from Conservative		Swing		

South Ockendon
Party	Candidate	Votes	%	±%
Labour	G. Miles	3,413	80.2	
Conservative	F. Beasley	845	19.8	
Majority		2,568	60.3	
Turnout		2,568	35.8	
Registered electors		11,901		
Labour hold		Swing		

Stanford-le-Hope
Party	Candidate	Votes	%	±%
Labour	J. Norris	2,594	62.9	
Conservative	W. O'Donoghue	1,528	37.1	
Majority		1,066	25.9	
Turnout		4,122	33.9	
Registered electors		12,159		
Labour gain from Conservative		Swing		

Tilbury
Party	Candidate	Votes	%	±%
Labour	P. Bolger	3,081	84.8	
Conservative	W. McLaughlin	551	15.2	
Majority		2,530	69.7	
Turnout		3,632	31.4	
Registered electors		11,554		
Labour hold		Swing		

West Thurrock & Aveley
Party	Candidate	Votes	%	±%
Labour	C. Bidmead	2,605	55.5	
Ind. Labour Party	F. Boultwood	973	20.7	
Conservative	R. Grove	734	15.7	
Liberal	J. Norris	281	6.0	
Ecology	M. Crowson	97	2.1	
Majority		1,632	34.8	
Turnout		4,690	41.1	
Registered electors		11,412		
Labour hold		Swing		

=== Uttlesford ===
Uttlesford District Summary
Party	Seats	+/-	Votes	%	+/-
Conservative	4	Steady	10,840	50.1	–23.2
Labour	0	Steady	5,492	25.4	+6.0
Liberal	0	Steady	2,819	13.0	+5.7
Independent	0	Steady	2,504	11.6	N/A
Total	4	Steady	21,655	47.5	+2.5

Division results

Dunmow
Party	Candidate	Votes	%	±%
Conservative	M. Davey	2,705	53.2	N/A
Liberal	P. Pope	1,443	28.4	N/A
Labour	S. Cross	937	18.4	N/A
Majority		1,262	24.8	N/A
Turnout		5,085	49.1	N/A
Registered electors		10,355		
Conservative hold		Swing	N/A	

Saffron Walden
Party	Candidate	Votes	%	±%
Conservative	J. Moore	2,987	45.0	–30.8
Labour	P. Preece	2,282	34.3	+6.6
Liberal	P. Norman	1,376	20.7	N/A
Majority		705	10.6	–41.1
Turnout		6,645	51.0	+4.5
Registered electors		13,018		
Conservative hold		Swing	▼18.7	

Stansted
Party	Candidate	Votes	%	±%
Conservative	P. Wawn	2,517	50.0	–16.2
Independent	E. Mitchell	1,513	30.0	N/A
Labour	J. Graddon	1,007	20.0	+6.0
Majority		1,004	19.9	–26.4
Turnout		5,037	43.3	–4.0
Registered electors		11,627		
Conservative hold		Swing	N/A	

Thaxted
Party	Candidate	Votes	%	±%
Conservative	F. Askew	2,631	53.8	–26.5
Labour	J. Oliveira	1,266	25.9	+6.2
Independent	M. Snow	991	20.3	N/A
Majority		1,365	27.9	–32.6
Turnout		4,888	46.3	+6.3
Registered electors		10,558		
Conservative hold		Swing	▼16.4	

== By-elections ==
=== Thundersley ===
Thundersley: December 1981
Party	Candidate	Votes	%	±%
Alliance	Penny	894	48.0	+30.0
Conservative	Gallienne	720	38.7	–15.1
Labour	Turner	248	13.3	–14.9
Majority		174	9.3	
Turnout		1,862	20.0	
Registered electors		9,295		
Alliance gain from Conservative		Swing	▲22.6	

=== Basildon Gloucester Park (March 1982) ===
Basildon Gloucester Park: March 1982
Party	Candidate	Votes	%	±%
Labour	Batchelor	2,563	59.2	–8.4
Alliance	Butler	1,232	28.5	+11.1
Conservative	Lane	532	12.3	–2.7
Majority		1,331	30.7	
Turnout		4,327	34.6	
Registered electors		12,493		
Labour hold		Swing	▼9.8	

=== Dunmow ===
Dunmow: July 1982
Party	Candidate	Votes	%	±%
Conservative	Oakley	2,224	55.9	+2.7
Alliance	Taylor	1,409	35.4	+7.0
Labour	McCarthy	347	8.7	–9.7
Majority		815	20.5	
Turnout		3,980	37.6	
Registered electors		10,582		
Conservative hold		Swing	▼2.2	

=== Basildon Gloucester Park (October 1982) ===
Basildon Gloucester Park: October 1982
Party	Candidate	Votes	%	±%
Labour	Primmer	1,935	58.3	–9.3
Alliance	Bassett	827	24.9	+7.5
Conservative	Lane	556	16.8	+1.8
Majority		1,108	33.4	
Turnout		3,318	26.6	
Registered electors		12,493		
Labour hold		Swing	▼8.4	

=== Thorpe ===
Thorpe: October 1983
Party	Candidate	Votes	%	±%
Conservative	Rainger	1,405	64.4	+3.5
Alliance	Baker	473	21.7	+9.7
Labour	Hurley	302	13.9	–9.5
Majority		932	42.7	
Turnout		2,180	18.9	
Registered electors		11,512		
Conservative hold		Swing	▼3.1	

=== Gray Thurrock ===
Grays Thurrock: June 1984
Party	Candidate	Votes	%	±%
Labour	Cohen	1,471	48.9	+3.8
Conservative	Dimond	1,288	42.8	+1.2
Alliance	Benson	250	8.3	–5.0
Majority		183	6.1	
Turnout		3,009	23.3	
Registered electors		12,919		
Labour hold		Swing	▲1.3	

=== Springfield ===
Springfield: July 1984
Party	Candidate	Votes	%	±%
Conservative	Gore	2,504	48.5	+2.2
Alliance	Davey	2,184	42.3	+3.7
Labour	Hussey	474	9.2	–5.9
Majority		320	6.2	
Turnout		5,162	35.1	
Registered electors		14,723		
Conservative hold		Swing	▼0.8	

=== Netteswellbury ===
Netteswellbury: September 1984
Party	Candidate	Votes	%	±%
Labour	Guy	1,820	77.1	+11.1
Conservative	Smart	303	12.8	–2.7
Alliance	Scammell	238	10.1	–8.4
Majority		1,517	64.3	
Turnout		2,361	18.4	
Registered electors		12,809		
Labour hold		Swing	▲6.9	
