= 1973 Essex County Council election =

1973 English local election

12 April 1973	1977 →

All 97 seats to Essex County Council 49 seats needed for a majority
- Registered: 975,316
- Turnout: 36.0%

	First party	Second party	Third party
Party	Conservative	Labour	Liberal
Seats won	50	40	5
Popular vote	173,280	157,871	26,868
Percentage	47.2%	43.0%	7.3%
	Fourth party	Fifth party
Party	Independent	Residents
Seats won	1	1
Popular vote	3,886	3,241
Percentage	1.1%	0.9%
- Results of the 1973 Essex County Council election.
Council control after election
Conservative

The 1973 Essex County Council election took place on 12 April 1973 to elect members of Essex County Council in Essex, England. This was on the same day as other local elections.

This was the first election to Essex County Council following the structural reforms to local government laid out in the Local Government Act 1972.

== Summary ==
=== Election result ===
1973 Essex County Council election
Party	Candidates	Seats	Gains	Losses	Net gain/loss	Seats %	Votes %	Votes	+/−
Conservative	95	50	N/A	N/A	N/A	51.5	47.2	173,280	
Labour	96	40	N/A	N/A	N/A	41.2	43.0	157,871	
Liberal	17	5	N/A	N/A	N/A	5.2	7.3	26,868	
Independent	7	1	N/A	N/A	N/A	1.0	1.1	3,886	
Residents	2	1	N/A	N/A	N/A	1.0	0.9	3,241	
Democratic Labour	1	0	N/A	N/A	N/A	0.0	0.3	1,186	
Independent Labour	1	0	N/A	N/A	N/A	0.0	0.1	326	
Communist	2	0	N/A	N/A	N/A	0.0	0.1	252	

== Division results by local authority ==
=== Basildon ===
Summary

Basildon Borough Summary
Party	Seats	+/-	Votes	%	+/-
Labour	5		14,730	48.1	
Conservative	2		10,348	33.8	
Residents	1		3,241	10.6	
Democratic Labour	0		1,186	3.9	
Liberal	0		543	1.8	
Ind. Labour	0		326	1.1	
Independent	0		233	0.8	
Total	8		30,607	34.4	

Division results

Basildon No. 1 (Billericay)
Party	Candidate	Votes	%
Conservative	L. Greenfield	2,367	47.6
Residents	M. Cooke	2,178	43.8
Labour	C. Lynch	428	8.6
Majority		189	3.8
Turnout		4,973	38.9
Registered electors		12,775	
Conservative win (new seat)			

Basildon No. 2 (Central)
Party	Candidate	Votes	%
Labour	S. Townsend	2,228	52.7
Democratic Labour	J. Morgan	1,186	28.1
Conservative	J. Damm	813	19.2
Majority		1,042	24.7
Turnout		4,227	36.7
Registered electors		11,511	
Labour win (new seat)			

Basildon No. 3 (Fryerns)
Party	Candidate	Votes	%
Labour	R. Oliver	1,829	64.6
Conservative	R. Hughes	442	15.6
Independent Labour	R. Chaplin	326	11.5
Independent	K. Tyson	233	8.2
Majority		1,387	49.0
Turnout		2,830	27.0
Registered electors		10,499	
Labour win (new seat)			

Basildon No. 4 (Laindon)
Party	Candidate	Votes	%
Labour	G. Miller	1,858	69.4
Conservative	G. Harris	818	30.6
Majority		1,040	38.9
Turnout		2,676	27.5
Registered electors		9,745	
Labour win (new seat)			

Basildon No. 5 (Langdon Hills)
Party	Candidate	Votes	%
Labour	J. Woods	2,777	71.7
Conservative	P. Cole	1,094	28.3
Majority		1,683	43.5
Turnout		3,871	37.2
Registered electors		10,414	
Labour win (new seat)			

Basildon No. 6 (Pitsea)
Party	Candidate	Votes	%
Labour	W. Archibald	2,677	67.9
Conservative	H. Pembroke	1,268	32.1
Majority		1,409	35.7
Turnout		3,945	31.4
Registered electors		12,582	
Labour win (new seat)			

Basildon No. 7 (Ramsden)
Party	Candidate	Votes	%
Residents	C. Jones	1,063	40.2
Conservative	A. Stockley	778	29.4
Liberal	E. Fortune	543	20.5
Labour	D. Burn	259	9.8
Majority		285	10.8
Turnout		2,643	35.7
Registered electors		7,397	
Residents win (new seat)			

Basildon No. 8 (Wickford)
Party	Candidate	Votes	%
Conservative	G. Hodgson	2,768	50.9
Labour	R. Taylor	2,674	49.1
Majority		94	1.7
Turnout		5,442	38.4
Registered electors		14,168	
Conservative win (new seat)			

=== Braintree ===
Summary

Braintree District Summary
Party	Seats	+/-	Votes	%	+/-
Conservative	4		13,338	46.3	
Labour	3		12,199	42.4	
Liberal	0		3,106	10.8	
Communist	0		157	0.5	
Total	7		28,800	40.9	

Division results

Bardfield
Party	Candidate	Votes	%
Conservative	G. Curtis	1,728	61.8
Labour	R. Bartlett	1,066	38.2
Majority		662	23.7
Turnout		2,794	36.5
Registered electors		7,645	
Conservative win (new seat)			

Bocking
Party	Candidate	Votes	%
Labour	J. Tabor	2,088	62.0
Conservative	L. Lewis	1,278	38.0
Majority		810	24.1
Turnout		3,366	37.5
Registered electors		8,979	
Labour win (new seat)			

Braintree
Party	Candidate	Votes	%
Labour	J. Clarke	1,316	37.1
Liberal	J. Ross	1,214	34.3
Conservative	O. Sebag-Montefiore	1,014	28.6
Majority		102	2.9
Turnout		3,544	36.3
Registered electors		9,764	
Labour win (new seat)			

Coggeshall
Party	Candidate	Votes	%
Conservative	R. Dixon Smith	2,364	58.1
Labour	J. Lyon	1,703	41.9
Majority		661	16.3
Turnout		4,067	40.2
Registered electors		10,119	
Conservative win (new seat)			

Halstead
Party	Candidate	Votes	%
Conservative	I. Parker	3,192	59.1
Labour	R. Dixey	2,213	40.9
Majority		979	18.1
Turnout		5,405	48.2
Registered electors		11,214	
Conservative win (new seat)			

Hedingham
Party	Candidate	Votes	%
Conservative	G. Waterer	2,774	62.8
Labour	R. Mayes	1,644	37.2
Majority		1,130	25.6
Turnout		4,418	44.8
Registered electors		9,856	
Conservative win (new seat)			

Witham
Party	Candidate	Votes	%
Labour	J. Gyford	2,169	41.7
Liberal	R. Berry	1,892	36.3
Conservative	P. Ryland	988	19.0
Communist	F. Brown	157	3.0
Majority		277	5.3
Turnout		5,206	40.8
Registered electors		12,772	
Labour win (new seat)			

=== Brentwood ===
Summary

Brentwood District Summary
Party	Seats	+/-	Votes	%	+/-
Conservative	3		8,113	56.6	
Labour	1		5,378	37.5	
Liberal	0		756	5.3	
Communist	0		95	0.7	
Total	4		14,342	34.5	

Division results

Brentwood Central
Party	Candidate	Votes	%
Conservative	M. Hutton	1,793	68.3
Labour	J. Rowe	831	31.7
Majority		962	36.7
Turnout		2,624	26.5
Registered electors		9,907	
Conservative win (new seat)			

Brentwood Hutton
Party	Candidate	Votes	%
Conservative	J. Crofton	2,296	64.1
Labour	E. Harrison	1,284	35.9
Majority		1,012	28.3
Turnout		3,580	32.2
Registered electors		11,126	
Conservative win (new seat)			

Brentwood North
Party	Candidate	Votes	%
Conservative	L. Jago	1,994	70.1
Labour	D. Jones	852	29.9
Majority		1,142	40.1
Turnout		2,846	30.1
Registered electors		9,445	
Conservative win (new seat)			

Brentwood South
Party	Candidate	Votes	%
Labour	C. Maxey	2,411	45.6
Conservative	E. Sole	2,030	38.4
Liberal	A. Haywood-Biles	756	14.3
Communist	A. Simcox	95	1.8
Majority		381	7.2
Turnout		5,292	47.5
Registered electors		11,133	
Labour win (new seat)			

=== Castle Point ===
Summary

Castle Point District Summary
Party	Seats	+/-	Votes	%	+/-
Labour	3		9,721	48.0	
Conservative	2		10,385	51.3	
Independent	0		145	0.7	
Total	5		20,251	36.5	

Division results

Benfleet (Benfleet)
Party	Candidate	Votes	%
Labour	G. Auvache	2,318	51.6
Conservative	W. Harrison	2,170	48.4
Majority		148	3.3
Turnout		4,488	38.2
Registered electors		11,746	
Labour win (new seat)			

Benfleet (Hadleigh)
Party	Candidate	Votes	%
Conservative	R. Williams	2,998	68.0
Labour	D. Jeffrey	1,409	32.0
Majority		1,589	36.1
Turnout		4,407	38.5
Registered electors		11,448	
Conservative win (new seat)			

Benfleet (Thundersley)
Party	Candidate	Votes	%
Labour	P. Sanders	2,101	57.5
Conservative	G. Detmaur	1,410	38.6
Independent	G. Leonard	145	4.0
Majority		691	18.9
Turnout		3,656	30.8
Registered electors		11,863	
Labour win (new seat)			

Canvey Island (East)
Party	Candidate	Votes	%
Conservative	H. King	2,484	58.6
Labour	D. Shaw	1,758	41.4
Majority		726	17.1
Turnout		4,242	38.9
Registered electors		10,915	
Conservative win (new seat)			

Canvey Island (West)
Party	Candidate	Votes	%
Labour	G. Pickett	2,135	61.7
Conservative	F. Wood	1,323	38.3
Majority		812	23.5
Turnout		3,458	36.3
Registered electors		9,535	
Labour win (new seat)			

=== Chelmsford ===
Summary

Chelmsford District Summary
Party	Seats	+/-	Votes	%	+/-
Conservative	5		14,322	51.0	
Labour	2		10,841	38.6	
Liberal	1		2,942	10.5	
Total	8		28,105	36.0	

Division results

Chelsmford (East)
Party	Candidate	Votes	%
Liberal	R. Battey	2,491	61.7
Conservative	H. Pryce	958	23.7
Labour	K. Rose	590	14.6
Majority		1,533	38.0
Turnout		4,039	44.2
Registered electors		9,131	
Liberal win (new seat)			

Chelmsford (North)
Party	Candidate	Votes	%
Labour	W. Primmer	3,115	59.7
Conservative	R. Wale	2,103	40.3
Majority		1,012	19.4
Turnout		5,218	37.6
Registered electors		13,886	
Labour win (new seat)			

Chelmsford (West)
Party	Candidate	Votes	%
Labour	M. Edwards	1,535	53.8
Conservative	A. Arthur	1,316	46.2
Majority		219	7.7
Turnout		2,851	38.7
Registered electors		7,352	
Labour win (new seat)			

Chelmsford Rural No. 1
Party	Candidate	Votes	%
Conservative	D. Chatfield	2,114	74.6
Labour	A. Jones	720	25.4
Majority		1,394	49.2
Turnout		2,834	29.9
Registered electors		9,494	
Conservative win (new seat)			

Chelmsford Rural No. 2
Party	Candidate	Votes	%
Conservative	P. White	1,832	70.1
Labour	M. Game	781	29.9
Majority		1,051	40.2
Turnout		2,613	30.8
Registered electors		8,481	
Conservative win (new seat)			

Chelmsford Rural No. 3
Party	Candidate	Votes	%
Conservative	J. Mackintosh	2,014	63.0
Labour	W. Marsh	1,184	37.0
Majority		830	26.0
Turnout		3,198	34.7
Registered electors		9,210	
Conservative win (new seat)			

Chelmsford Rural No. 4
Party	Candidate	Votes	%
Conservative	B. Platt	1,649	57.4
Labour	M. Cane	773	26.9
Liberal	F. Lunniss	451	15.7
Majority		876	30.5
Turnout		2,873	42.6
Registered electors		6,750	
Conservative win (new seat)			

Chelmsford Rural No. 5 (Great Baddow)
Party	Candidate	Votes	%
Conservative	M. Foley	2,336	52.2
Labour	A. Deighton	2,143	47.8
Majority		193	4.3
Turnout		4,479	32.3
Registered electors		13,864	
Conservative win (new seat)			

=== Colchester ===
Summary

Colchester District Summary
Party	Seats	+/-	Votes	%	+/-
Conservative	4		17,105	52.5	
Labour	4		14,125	43.4	
Liberal	0		1,344	4.1	
Total	8		32,574	38.6	

Division results

Colchester No. 1 (East)
Party	Candidate	Votes	%
Labour	J. Bensusan-Butt	2,302	64.0
Conservative	E. Gawthrop	1,293	36.0
Majority		1,009	28.1
Turnout		3,595	42.4
Registered electors		8,475	
Labour win (new seat)			

Colchester No. 2 (South)
Party	Candidate	Votes	%
Labour	I. Brown	1,848	43.9
Liberal	M. Gage	1,344	31.9
Conservative	E. White	1,015	24.1
Majority		504	12.0
Turnout		4,207	36.7
Registered electors		11,473	
Labour win (new seat)			

Colchester No. 3 (West)
Party	Candidate	Votes	%
Conservative	P. Wormell	3,154	69.3
Labour	W. Ladbrook	1,399	30.7
Majority		1,755	38.5
Turnout		4,553	44.3
Registered electors		10,273	
Conservative win (new seat)			

Colchester No. 4
Party	Candidate	Votes	%
Labour	C. Robb	2,251	52.1
Conservative	D. Lamberth	2,071	47.9
Majority		180	4.2
Turnout		4,322	44.6
Registered electors		10,273	
Labour win (new seat)			

Colchester No. 5
Party	Candidate	Votes	%
Labour	C. Pell	2,717	54.1
Conservative	D. Turberville	2,307	45.9
Majority		410	8.2
Turnout		5,024	32.5
Registered electors		15,455	
Labour win (new seat)			

Dedham
Party	Candidate	Votes	%
Conservative	G. Hickson	2,479	70.6
Labour	R. Mayhew	1,034	29.4
Majority		1,445	41.1
Turnout		3,513	37.5
Registered electors		9,380	
Conservative win (new seat)			

Lexden
Party	Candidate	Votes	%
Conservative	L. Diss	2,226	56.7
Labour	B. Jones	1,699	43.3
Majority		527	13.4
Turnout		3,925	37.3
Registered electors		10,535	
Conservative win (new seat)			

Mersea
Party	Candidate	Votes	%
Conservative	R. Fairhead	2,563	74.5
Labour	P. Tooke	875	25.5
Majority		1,688	49.1
Turnout		3,438	40.0
Registered electors		8,590	
Conservative win (new seat)			

=== Epping Forest ===
Summary

Epping Forest District Summary
Party	Seats	+/-	Votes	%	+/-
Conservative	8		19,586	59.7	
Labour	1		12,500	38.1	
Liberal	0		743	2.3	
Total	9		32,829	34.6	

Chigwell (Buckhurst Hill)
Party	Candidate	Votes	%
Conservative	E. Perry	1,723	68.2
Labour	S. Palfreman	802	31.8
Majority		921	36.5
Turnout		2,525	28.0
Registered electors		9,020	
Conservative win (new seat)			

Chigwell (Chigwell)
Party	Candidate	Votes	%
Conservative	S. Barnett	1,725	83.1
Labour	J. Turner	351	16.9
Majority		1,374	66.2
Turnout		2,076	23.3
Registered electors		8,902	
Conservative win (new seat)			

Chigwell (Loughton North)
Party	Candidate	Votes	%
Labour	F. Davis	2,627	63.4
Conservative	B. McGreal	1,518	36.6
Majority		1,109	26.8
Turnout		4,145	35.9
Registered electors		11,551	
Labour win (new seat)			

Chigwell (Loughton South)
Party	Candidate	Votes	%
Conservative	N. Crafford	2,028	51.5
Labour	B. Mooney	1,909	48.5
Majority		119	3.0
Turnout		3,937	34.0
Registered electors		11,567	
Conservative win (new seat)			

Epping
Party	Candidate	Votes	%
Conservative	R. Daniels	2,614	77.0
Labour	D. Clark	779	23.0
Majority		1,835	54.1
Turnout		3,393	30.0
Registered electors		11,320	
Conservative win (new seat)			

Epping & Ongar No. 1
Party	Candidate	Votes	%
Conservative	G. Padfield	2,582	63.6
Labour	M. Skudder	1,479	36.4
Majority		1,103	27.2
Turnout		4,061	36.7
Registered electors		11,066	
Conservative win (new seat)			

Epping & Ongar No. 2
Party	Candidate	Votes	%
Conservative	J. Martin	2,772	63.0
Labour	R. Barnes	1,627	37.0
Majority		1,145	26.0
Turnout		4,399	42.8
Registered electors		10,279	
Conservative win (new seat)			

Epping & Ongar No. 3
Party	Candidate	Votes	%
Conservative	D. Jones	2,354	60.4
Labour	D. Green	803	20.6
Liberal	G. Neal	743	19.1
Majority		1,551	39.8
Turnout		3,900	35.9
Registered electors		10,866	
Conservative win (new seat)			

Waltham Abbey
Party	Candidate	Votes	%
Conservative	E. Tuck	2,270	51.7
Labour	C. Hewins	2,123	48.3
Majority		147	3.3
Turnout		4,393	42.8
Registered electors		10,261	
Conservative win (new seat)			

=== Harlow ===
Summary

Harlow District Summary
Party	Seats	+/-	Votes	%	+/-
Labour	5		13,130	73.1	
Conservative	0		4,106	22.9	
Liberal	0		717	4.0	
Total	5		17,953	34.7	

Division results

Harlow (Great Parndon)
Party	Candidate	Votes	%
Labour	E. Morris	3,144	71.6
Conservative	A. Pickford	1,248	28.4
Majority		1,896	43.2
Turnout		4,392	32.2
Registered electors		13,653	
Labour win (new seat)			

Harlow (Harlow & Mark Hall)
Party	Candidate	Votes	%
Labour	S. Anderson	2,844	72.7
Conservative	W. Jones	1,068	27.3
Majority		1,776	45.4
Turnout		3,912	38.6
Registered electors		10,139	
Labour win (new seat)			

Harlow (Harlow Common)
Party	Candidate	Votes	%
Labour	E. Myers	2,932	80.4
Conservative	L. Chapman	716	19.6
Majority		3,648	60.7
Turnout		3,648	35.0
Registered electors		10,408	
Labour win (new seat)			

Harlow (Little Parndon & Town Centre)
Party	Candidate	Votes	%
Labour	G. Newport	1,735	61.3
Liberal	S. Ward	717	25.3
Conservative	R. Seeley	379	13.4
Majority		1,018	36.0
Turnout		2,452	38.9
Registered electors		7,279	
Labour win (new seat)			

Harlow (Netteswellbury)
Party	Candidate	Votes	%
Labour	J. Desormeaux	2,475	78.1
Conservative	A. Hayes	695	21.9
Majority		1,780	56.2
Turnout		3,170	34.8
Registered electors		9,103	
Labour win (new seat)			

=== Maldon ===
Summary

Maldon District Summary
Party	Seats	+/-	Votes	%	+/-
Conservative	2		6,074	54.1	
Labour	1		3,597	32.1	
Liberal	0		1,552	13.8	
Total	3		11,223	36.2	

Division results

Maldon
Party	Candidate	Votes	%
Labour	D. Wimhurst	1,631	36.3
Liberal	N. Smith	1,552	34.5
Conservative	J. Wadsworth	1,314	29.2
Majority		79	1.8
Turnout		4,497	44.0
Registered electors		10,230	
Labour win (new seat)			

Southminster
Party	Candidate	Votes	%
Conservative	D. Fisher	1,996	68.4
Labour	A. Cottam	923	31.6
Majority		1,073	36.8
Turnout		2,919	27.5
Registered electors		10,597	
Conservative win (new seat)			

Tollesbury
Party	Candidate	Votes	%
Conservative	E. Dalley	2,764	72.6
Labour	A. Pendle	1,043	27.4
Majority		1,721	45.2
Turnout		3,807	37.3
Registered electors		10,213	
Conservative win (new seat)			

=== Rochford ===
Summary

Rochford District Summary
Party	Seats	+/-	Votes	%	+/-
Conservative	3		7,829	48.7	
Labour	1		6,976	43.4	
Independent	1		1,264	7.9	
Total	5		16,069	32.7	

Division results

Rayleigh (North)
Party	Candidate	Votes	%
Conservative	R. Foley	1,497	52.1
Labour	T. Mair	1,377	47.9
Majority		120	4.2
Turnout		2,874	31.5
Registered electors		9,132	
Conservative win (new seat)			

Rayleigh (South)
Party	Candidate	Votes	%
Conservative	P. Elliott	1,844	52.1
Labour	R. McCamley	1,698	47.9
Majority		146	4.1
Turnout		3,542	35.3
Registered electors		10,026	
Conservative win (new seat)			

Rochford (North)
Party	Candidate	Votes	%
Independent	D. Wood	1,264	42.4
Conservative	S. Robson	1,088	36.5
Labour	G. Caplan	631	21.2
Majority		176	5.9
Turnout		2,983	29.6
Registered electors		10,072	
Independent win (new seat)			

Rochford (South)
Party	Candidate	Votes	%
Labour	J. Warner	2,093	53.0
Conservative	H. Ellis	1,857	47.0
Majority		236	6.0
Turnout		3,950	40.8
Registered electors		9,672	
Labour win (new seat)			

Rochford (West)
Party	Candidate	Votes	%
Conservative	J. Jones	1,543	56.7
Labour	C. Morgan	1,177	43.3
Majority		366	13.5
Turnout		2,720	26.7
Registered electors		10,178	
Conservative win (new seat)			

=== Southend ===
Summary

Southend District Summary
Party	Seats	+/-	Votes	%	+/-
Conservative	6		27,814	46.4	
Labour	4		20,731	34.6	
Liberal	3		11,232	18.7	
Independent	0		158	0.3	
Total	13		59,935	38.2	

Division results

Southend No. 1 (Eastwood)
Party	Candidate	Votes	%
Liberal	D. Evans	2,938	56.2
Conservative	S. D'ath	1,743	33.4
Labour	P. Hammond	543	10.4
Majority		1,195	22.9
Turnout		5,224	41.9
Registered electors		12,469	
Liberal win (new seat)			

Southend No. 2 (Prittlewell)
Party	Candidate	Votes	%
Liberal	J. Sargent	2,497	58.3
Conservative	M. Joel	966	22.5
Labour	R. Kennedy	665	15.5
Independent	A. Fuller	158	3.7
Majority		1,531	35.7
Turnout		4,286	47.4
Registered electors		9,045	
Liberal win (new seat)			

Southend No. 3 (Leigh)
Party	Candidate	Votes	%
Liberal	M. King	2,673	64.5
Conservative	L. Woodward	1,251	30.2
Labour	M. Luker	219	5.3
Majority		1,422	34.3
Turnout		4,143	54.3
Registered electors		7,623	
Liberal win (new seat)			

Southend No. 4 (St Clements)
Party	Candidate	Votes	%
Conservative	D. Atkinson	2,291	50.4
Liberal	A. Crystall	2,129	46.8
Labour	A. Hurd	128	2.8
Majority		162	3.6
Turnout		4,548	57.2
Registered electors		7,946	
Conservative win (new seat)			

Southend No. 5 (Chalkwell)
Party	Candidate	Votes	%
Conservative	N. Harris	1,793	57.1
Liberal	F. Owens	995	31.7
Labour	L. Morris	352	11.2
Majority		798	25.4
Turnout		3,140	39.5
Registered electors		7,959	
Conservative win (new seat)			

Southend No. 6 (2 seats)
Party	Candidate	Votes	%
Conservative	N. Clarke	4,146	59.7
Conservative	R. Marriott	4,099	59.0
Labour	A. Pearson-Clarke	3,018	43.5
Labour	T. Sandall	2,622	37.8
Turnout		6,943	30.3
Registered electors		22,916	
Conservative win (new seat)			
Conservative win (new seat)			

Southend No. 7 (2 seats)
Party	Candidate	Votes	%
Labour	W. Bowyer	2,978	57.6
Labour	R. Copley	2,788	53.9
Conservative	A. Scholfield	2,345	45.3
Conservative	B. Scholfield	2,237	43.2
Turnout		5,172	34.0
Registered electors		15,211	
Labour win (new seat)			
Labour win (new seat)			

Southend No. 8 (Shoebury)
Party	Candidate	Votes	%
Labour	M. Gordon	1,561	52.9
Conservative	V. Smith	1,390	47.1
Majority		171	5.8
Turnout		2,951	36.2
Registered electors		8,154	
Labour win (new seat)			

Southend No. 9 (Thorpe)
Party	Candidate	Votes	%
Conservative	H. Hill	2,715	82.1
Labour	D. Clarke	591	17.9
Majority		2,124	64.2
Turnout		3,306	33.3
Registered electors		9,939	
Conservative win (new seat)			

Southend No. 10
Party	Candidate	Votes	%
Labour	M. Burstin	3,065	76.0
Conservative	G. Littler	968	24.0
Majority		2,097	52.0
Turnout		4,033	35.4
Registered electors		11,387	
Labour win (new seat)			

Southend No. 11
Party	Candidate	Votes	%
Conservative	A. Wright	2,201	54.1
Labour	G. Elvin	1,870	45.9
Majority		331	8.1
Turnout		4,071	32.3
Registered electors		12,617	
Conservative win (new seat)			

=== Tendring ===
Summary

Tendring District Summary
Party	Seats	+/-	Votes	%	+/-
Conservative	6		17,672	54.0	
Labour	1		11,747	35.9	
Liberal	1		2,367	7.2	
Independent	0		929	2.8	
Total	8		32,715	39.2	

Division results

Brightlingsea
Party	Candidate	Votes	%
Liberal	T. Dale	2,367	44.9
Conservative	W. Bottomley	1,372	26.0
Labour	E. Pomroy	1,100	20.9
Independent	P. Creek	435	8.2
Majority		995	18.9
Turnout		5,274	45.3
Registered electors		11,642	
Liberal win (new seat)			

Clacton No. 1 (North)
Party	Candidate	Votes	%
Labour	R. Smith	2,005	53.0
Conservative	B. Matthews	1,777	47.0
Majority		228	6.0
Turnout		3,782	38.1
Registered electors		9,932	
Labour win (new seat)			

Clacton No. 2
Party	Candidate	Votes	%
Conservative	H. Harvey-Williams	2,065	55.4
Labour	A. Markham-Lee	1,665	44.6
Majority		400	10.7
Turnout		3,730	34.0
Registered electors		10,959	
Conservative win (new seat)			

Clacton No. 3
Party	Candidate	Votes	%
Conservative	J. Story	3,187	67.3
Labour	L. Smith	1,055	22.3
Independent	M. Swinfield-Wells	494	10.4
Majority		2,132	45.0
Turnout		4,736	41.8
Registered electors		11,333	
Conservative win (new seat)			

Frinton & Walton
Party	Candidate	Votes	%
Conservative	H. Johnston	2,872	78.2
Labour	L. Larkin	799	21.8
Majority		2,073	56.5
Turnout		3,671	32.0
Registered electors		11,469	
Conservative win (new seat)			

Harwich
Party	Candidate	Votes	%
Conservative	W. Bleakley	2,839	58.2
Labour	P. McCurry	2,043	41.8
Majority		796	16.3
Turnout		4,882	44.2
Registered electors		11,041	
Conservative win (new seat)			

Tendring Rural No. 1 (Tendring)
Party	Candidate	Votes	%
Conservative	A. Moles	2,032	56.3
Labour	G. Turner	1,575	43.7
Majority		457	12.7
Turnout		3,607	38.1
Registered electors		9,474	
Conservative win (new seat)			

Tendring Rural No. 2
Party	Candidate	Votes	%
Conservative	H. Varney	1,528	50.4
Labour	D. Bradbury	1,505	49.6
Majority		23	0.8
Turnout		3,033	40.3
Registered electors		7,533	
Conservative win (new seat)			

=== Thurrock ===
Summary

Thurrock District Summary
Party	Seats	+/-	Votes	%	+/-
Labour	9		16,929	68.6	
Conservative	0		6,606	26.8	
Independent	0		1,157	4.7	
Total	9		24,692	28.0	

Division results

Thurrock No. 1 (Chadwell)
Party	Candidate	Votes	%
Labour	A. Siddons	1,734	83.2
Conservative	A. Hart	349	16.8
Majority		1,385	66.5
Turnout		2,083	22.5
Registered electors		9,255	
Labour win (new seat)			

Thurrock No. 2 (Grays Thurrock)
Party	Candidate	Votes	%
Labour	R. Robertson	1,740	68.0
Conservative	P. Gurnett	819	32.0
Majority		921	36.0
Turnout		2,559	26.4
Registered electors		9,692	
Labour win (new seat)			

Thurrock No. 3 (Little Thurrock)
Party	Candidate	Votes	%
Labour	F. Barker	1,469	55.2
Conservative	W. O'Donoghue	1,193	44.8
Majority		276	10.4
Turnout		2,662	35.6
Registered electors		7,471	
Labour win (new seat)			

Thurrock No. 4 (Orsett & Stifford)
Party	Candidate	Votes	%
Labour	J. Pollard	1,967	62.1
Conservative	S. Herrington	1,200	37.9
Majority		767	24.2
Turnout		3,167	31.9
Registered electors		9,937	
Labour win (new seat)			

Thurrock No. 5 (South Ockendon)
Party	Candidate	Votes	%
Labour	P. Harty	2,198	87.3
Conservative	K. Brewer	319	12.7
Majority		1,879	74.7
Turnout		2,517	18.0
Registered electors		14,018	
Labour win (new seat)			

Thurrock No. 6 (Corringham)
Party	Candidate	Votes	%
Labour	R. Goldsmith	1,946	65.3
Conservative	E. Jennings	1,032	34.7
Majority		913	30.7
Turnout		2,978	31.8
Registered electors		9,358	
Labour win (new seat)			

Thurrock No. 7 (Tilbury)
Party	Candidate	Votes	%
Labour	A. Jones	1,334	53.6
Independent	T. Kendel	1,157	46.4
Majority		177	7.1
Turnout		2,491	32.4
Registered electors		7,699	
Labour win (new seat)			

Thurrock No. 8 (West Thurrock & Aveley)
Party	Candidate	Votes	%
Labour	C. Bidmead	2,233	85.3
Conservative	M. Sutton	386	14.7
Majority		1,847	70.5
Turnout		2,619	26.5
Registered electors		9,867	
Labour win (new seat)			

Thurrock No. 9 (Stanford-le-Hope)
Party	Candidate	Votes	%
Labour	T. Price	2,308	63.8
Conservative	D. Affleck	1,308	36.2
Majority		1,000	27.7
Turnout		3,616	33.6
Registered electors		10,757	
Labour win (new seat)			

=== Uttlesford ===
Summary

Uttlesford District Summary
Party	Seats	+/-	Votes	%	+/-
Conservative	4		9,650	57.4	
Labour	0		5,599	33.3	
Liberal	0		1,566	9.3	
Total	4		16,815	41.5	

Division results

Dunmow
Party	Candidate	Votes	%
Conservative	M. Davey	2,219	68.7
Labour	B. Clark	1,010	31.3
Majority		1,209	37.4
Turnout		3,229	35.4
Registered electors		9,126	
Conservative win (new seat)			

Saffron Walden
Party	Candidate	Votes	%
Conservative	T. Collins	3,211	54.8
Labour	P. Preece	2,653	45.2
Majority		558	9.5
Turnout		5,864	47.1
Registered electors		12,454	
Conservative win (new seat)			

Stansted
Party	Candidate	Votes	%
Conservative	A. Carnwath	2,229	50.2
Liberal	P. Clark	1,566	35.3
Labour	D. Fowler-Dixon	647	14.6
Majority		663	14.9
Turnout		4,442	41.6
Registered electors		10,688	
Conservative win (new seat)			

Thaxted
Party	Candidate	Votes	%
Conservative	D. Golding	1,991	60.7
Labour	G. Fraenkel	1,289	39.3
Majority		702	21.4
Turnout		3,280	39.9
Registered electors		8,227	
Conservative win (new seat)			
