= 1977 Essex County Council election =

1977 UK local government election

| ← 1973 | 5 May 1977 | 1981 → |

All 97 seats to Essex County Council 49 seats needed for a majority

| | First party | Second party | Third party |
|---|---|---|---|
| Party | Conservative | Labour | Liberal |
| Seats won | 83 | 12 | 2 |
| Seat change | ▲33 | ▼28 | ▼3 |
| Popular vote | 256,703 | 110,591 | 36,240 |
| Percentage | 62.1% | 26.8% | 8.8% |
| Swing | ▲14.8% | ▼16.3% | ▲1.5% |
- Results of the 1977 Essex County Council election.
Council control before election
Conservative
Council control after election
Conservative

The 1977 Essex County Council election took place on 5 May 1977 to elect members of Essex County Council in England. This was on the same day as other local elections.

== Summary ==
1977 Essex County Council election
| Party | Seats | Gains | Losses | Net gain/loss | Seats % | Votes % | Votes | +/− |
|---|---|---|---|---|---|---|---|---|
| Conservative | 83 | 33 | 0 | ▲33 | 82.9 | 62.1 | 256,703 | +14.8 |
| Labour | 12 | 0 | 28 | ▼28 | 14.6 | 26.8 | 110,591 | –16.3 |
| Liberal | 2 | 0 | 3 | ▼3 | 2.4 | 8.8 | 36,240 | +1.5 |
| Residents | 0 | 0 | 1 | ▼1 | 0.0 | 1.1 | 4,373 | +0.2 |
| Independent | 0 | 0 | 1 | ▼1 | 0.0 | 0.9 | 3,695 | –0.1 |
| National Front | 0 | 0 | 0 | Steady | 0.0 | 0.4 | 1,483 | N/A |
| Independent Labour | 0 | 0 | 0 | Steady | 0.0 | 0.1 | 222 | ±0.0 |
| Communist | 0 | 0 | 0 | Steady | 0.0 | <0.1 | 65 | –0.1 |

== Division results by authority ==
=== Basildon ===
Summary

Basildon Borough Summary
| Party | Seats | +/- | Votes | % | +/- |
|---|---|---|---|---|---|
| Conservative | 5 | ▲3 | 23,343 | 52.6 | +18.8 |
| Labour | 3 | ▼2 | 13,768 | 31.0 | –17.1 |
| Residents | 0 | ▼1 | 4,373 | 9.9 | –0.7 |
| Liberal | 0 | Steady | 1,732 | 3.9 | +2.1 |
| National Front | 0 | Steady | 927 | 2.1 | N/A |
| Ind. Labour | 0 | Steady | 222 | 0.5 | –0.6 |
| Total | 8 | Steady | 44,365 | 46.7 | +12.3 |

Division results

Basildon No. 1 (Billericay)
| Party | Candidate | Votes | % | ±% |
|---|---|---|---|---|
| Conservative | L. Greenfield* | 4,627 | 58.5 | +10.9 |
| Residents | M. Cooke | 2,664 | 33.7 | –10.1 |
| Labour | C. Lynch | 423 | 5.3 | –3.3 |
| Liberal | T. McCartan | 196 | 2.5 | N/A |
| Majority | | 1,963 | 24.8 | +21.0 |
| Turnout | | 7,910 | 58.0 | +19.1 |
| Registered electors | | 13,659 | | |
| Conservative hold | | Swing | ▲10.5 | |

Basildon No. 2 (Central)
| Party | Candidate | Votes | % | ±% |
|---|---|---|---|---|
| Labour | D. Taylor | 2,758 | 47.9 | –4.8 |
| Conservative | J. Damm | 2,745 | 47.7 | +28.5 |
| National Front | G. Canham | 174 | 3.0 | N/A |
| Independent Labour | C. Cooper | 77 | 1.3 | N/A |
| Majority | | 13 | 0.2 | –24.5 |
| Turnout | | 5,754 | 43.1 | +6.4 |
| Registered electors | | 13,386 | | |
| Labour hold | | Swing | ▼16.7 | |

Basildon No. 3 (Fryerns)
| Party | Candidate | Votes | % | ±% |
|---|---|---|---|---|
| Labour | W. Archibald | 2,216 | 53.6 | –11.0 |
| Conservative | D. Solly | 1,610 | 38.9 | +23.3 |
| National Front | L. Gardiner | 166 | 4.0 | N/A |
| Independent Labour | R. Chaplin | 145 | 3.5 | –8.0 |
| Majority | | 606 | 14.6 | –34.4 |
| Turnout | | 5,754 | 38.7 | +11.7 |
| Registered electors | | 10,711 | | |
| Labour hold | | Swing | ▼17.2 | |

Basildon No. 4 (Laindon)
| Party | Candidate | Votes | % | ±% |
|---|---|---|---|---|
| Conservative | I. Scott | 1,942 | 53.9 | +23.3 |
| Labour | G. Miller* | 1,504 | 41.8 | –27.6 |
| National Front | R. Robertson | 156 | 4.3 | N/A |
| Majority | | 438 | 12.2 | N/A |
| Turnout | | 3,602 | 36.0 | +8.5 |
| Registered electors | | 10,021 | | |
| Conservative gain from Labour | | Swing | ▲25.5 | |

Basildon No. 5 (Langdon Hills)
| Party | Candidate | Votes | % | ±% |
|---|---|---|---|---|
| Labour | J. Costello | 2,865 | 48.8 | –22.9 |
| Conservative | S. Blackbourn | 2,790 | 47.5 | +19.2 |
| National Front | M. Bishop | 216 | 3.7 | N/A |
| Majority | | 75 | 1.3 | –42.2 |
| Turnout | | 5,871 | 50.2 | +13.0 |
| Registered electors | | 11,700 | | |
| Labour hold | | Swing | ▼21.1 | |

Basildon No. 6 (Pitsea)
| Party | Candidate | Votes | % | ±% |
|---|---|---|---|---|
| Conservative | E. Dines | 2,993 | 49.3 | +17.2 |
| Labour | W. Primmer | 2,399 | 39.5 | –28.4 |
| Liberal | B. Mavis | 466 | 7.7 | N/A |
| National Front | B. Weedon | 215 | 3.5 | N/A |
| Majority | | 594 | 9.8 | N/A |
| Turnout | | 6,073 | 37.5 | +6.1 |
| Registered electors | | 16,252 | | |
| Conservative gain from Labour | | Swing | ▲22.8 | |

Basildon No. 7 (Ramsden)
| Party | Candidate | Votes | % | ±% |
|---|---|---|---|---|
| Conservative | C. Ball | 2,204 | 52.2 | +22.8 |
| Residents | C. Jones* | 1,709 | 40.5 | +0.3 |
| Labour | J. Amey | 310 | 7.3 | –2.5 |
| Majority | | 495 | 11.7 | N/A |
| Turnout | | 4,223 | 54.8 | +19.1 |
| Registered electors | | 7,712 | | |
| Conservative gain from Residents | | Swing | ▲11.3 | |

Basildon No. 8 (Wickford)
| Party | Candidate | Votes | % | ±% |
|---|---|---|---|---|
| Conservative | E. Mickelborough | 4,432 | 65.2 | +14.3 |
| Labour | D. Harrison | 1,293 | 19.0 | –30.1 |
| Liberal | M. Foley | 1,070 | 15.7 | N/A |
| Majority | | 3,139 | 46.2 | +7.8 |
| Turnout | | 6,795 | 45.3 | +6.9 |
| Registered electors | | 15,017 | | |
| Conservative hold | | Swing | ▲22.2 | |

=== Braintree ===
Summary

Braintree District Summary
| Party | Seats | +/- | Votes | % | +/- |
|---|---|---|---|---|---|
| Conservative | 7 | ▲3 | 16,881 | 61.8 | +15.5 |
| Labour | 0 | ▼3 | 7,506 | 27.5 | –14.9 |
| Liberal | 0 | Steady | 2,799 | 10.2 | –0.6 |
| Independent | 0 | Steady | 138 | 0.5 | N/A |
| Total | 7 | Steady | 27,324 | 39.4 | –1.5 |

Division results

Bardfield
| Party | Candidate | Votes | % | ±% |
|---|---|---|---|---|
| Conservative | O. Sebag-Montefiore | 2,767 | 76.6 | +14.8 |
| Labour | P. Austin | 519 | 14.4 | –23.8 |
| Liberal | R. Chisholm | 324 | 9.0 | N/A |
| Majority | | 2,248 | 62.3 | +38.6 |
| Turnout | | 3,610 | 44.7 | +8.2 |
| Registered electors | | 8,091 | | |
| Conservative hold | | Swing | ▲19.3 | |

Bocking
| Party | Candidate | Votes | % | ±% |
|---|---|---|---|---|
| Conservative | J. Gilthorpe | 2,224 | 51.0 | +13.0 |
| Labour | A. Millam | 1,429 | 32.8 | –29.2 |
| Liberal | K. Webb | 705 | 16.2 | N/A |
| Majority | | 795 | 18.2 | N/A |
| Turnout | | 4,358 | 41.8 | +4.3 |
| Registered electors | | 10,434 | | |
| Conservative gain from Labour | | Swing | ▲21.1 | |

Braintree
| Party | Candidate | Votes | % | ±% |
|---|---|---|---|---|
| Conservative | D. Kerry | 2,172 | 51.6 | +23.0 |
| Labour | J. Clarke* | 1,089 | 25.9 | –11.2 |
| Liberal | D. Harvey | 946 | 22.5 | –11.8 |
| Majority | | 1,083 | 25.7 | N/A |
| Turnout | | 4,207 | 40.4 | +4.1 |
| Registered electors | | 10,444 | | |
| Conservative gain from Labour | | Swing | ▲17.1 | |

Coggeshall
| Party | Candidate | Votes | % | ±% |
|---|---|---|---|---|
| Conservative | Robert Dixon-Smith* | 2,999 | 69.7 | +11.6 |
| Labour | J. Lyon | 967 | 22.5 | –19.4 |
| Liberal | J. Walker | 334 | 7.8 | N/A |
| Majority | | 2,032 | 47.3 | +31.0 |
| Turnout | | 4,300 | 42.2 | +2.0 |
| Registered electors | | 10,212 | | |
| Conservative hold | | Swing | ▲15.5 | |

Halstead
| Party | Candidate | Votes | % | ±% |
|---|---|---|---|---|
| Conservative | O. Joyce | 3,634 | 73.7 | +14.6 |
| Labour | K. Jones | 1,299 | 26.3 | −14.6 |
| Majority | | 2,335 | 47.3 | +29.2 |
| Turnout | | 4,933 | 41.4 | –6.8 |
| Registered electors | | 11,945 | | |
| Conservative hold | | Swing | ▲14.6 | |

Hedingham
| Party | Candidate | Votes | % | ±% |
|---|---|---|---|---|
| Conservative | G. Waterer* | Unopposed | | |
| Registered electors | | 9,858 | | |
| Conservative hold | | | | |

Witham
| Party | Candidate | Votes | % | ±% |
|---|---|---|---|---|
| Conservative | D. Willetts | 3,085 | 52.1 | +33.1 |
| Labour | J. Gyford* | 2,203 | 37.2 | –4.5 |
| Liberal | D. Bigg | 490 | 8.3 | –28.0 |
| Independent | J. Humphrys | 138 | 2.3 | N/A |
| Majority | | 882 | 14.9 | N/A |
| Turnout | | 4,916 | 38.0 | –2.8 |
| Registered electors | | 15,627 | | |
| Conservative gain from Labour | | Swing | ▲18.8 | |

=== Brentwood ===
Summary

Brentwood District Summary
| Party | Seats | +/- | Votes | % | +/- |
|---|---|---|---|---|---|
| Conservative | 4 | ▲1 | 13,045 | 70.4 | +13.8 |
| Labour | 0 | ▼1 | 4,836 | 26.1 | –11.4 |
| Liberal | 0 | Steady | 587 | 3.2 | –2.1 |
| Communist | 0 | Steady | 65 | 0.4 | –0.3 |
| Total | 4 | Steady | 18,533 | 44.1 | +9.6 |

Division results

Brentwood Central
| Party | Candidate | Votes | % | ±% |
|---|---|---|---|---|
| Conservative | M. Hutton* | 2,726 | 67.9 | –0.4 |
| Labour | E. Harrison | 702 | 17.5 | –14.2 |
| Liberal | R. Cozens | 587 | 14.6 | N/A |
| Majority | | 2,024 | 50.4 | +13.7 |
| Turnout | | 4,015 | 40.5 | +14.0 |
| Registered electors | | 9,940 | | |
| Conservative hold | | Swing | ▲6.9 | |

Brentwood Hutton
| Party | Candidate | Votes | % | ±% |
|---|---|---|---|---|
| Conservative | J. Crofton* | 3,806 | 80.9 | +16.8 |
| Labour | A. Cozens | 834 | 17.7 | –18.2 |
| Communist | D. Henderson | 65 | 1.4 | N/A |
| Majority | | 2,972 | 63.2 | +34.9 |
| Turnout | | 4,705 | 41.9 | +9.7 |
| Registered electors | | 11,251 | | |
| Conservative hold | | Swing | ▲17.5 | |

Brentwood North
| Party | Candidate | Votes | % | ±% |
|---|---|---|---|---|
| Conservative | L. Jago* | 3,201 | 78.6 | +8.5 |
| Labour | L. Southgate | 872 | 21.4 | –8.5 |
| Majority | | 2,329 | 57.2 | +17.1 |
| Turnout | | 4,073 | 41.4 | +10.3 |
| Registered electors | | 9,870 | | |
| Conservative hold | | Swing | ▲8.5 | |

Brentwood South
| Party | Candidate | Votes | % | ±% |
|---|---|---|---|---|
| Conservative | J. Hayward | 3,312 | 57.7 | +19.3 |
| Labour | C. Maxey* | 2,428 | 42.3 | –3.3 |
| Majority | | 884 | 15.4 | N/A |
| Turnout | | 5,740 | 52.7 | +5.2 |
| Registered electors | | 10,941 | | |
| Conservative gain from Labour | | Swing | ▲11.3 | |

=== Castle Point ===
Summary

Castle Point District Summary
| Party | Seats | +/- | Votes | % | +/- |
|---|---|---|---|---|---|
| Conservative | 5 | ▲3 | 16,409 | 71.3 | +20.0 |
| Labour | 0 | ▼3 | 5,876 | 25.5 | –22.5 |
| Liberal | 0 | Steady | 727 | 3.2 | N/A |
| Total | 5 | Steady | 23,012 | 38.5 | +2.0 |

Division results

Benfleet (Benfleet)
| Party | Candidate | Votes | % | ±% |
|---|---|---|---|---|
| Conservative | J. Pike | 4,056 | 75.2 | +26.8 |
| Labour | G. Auvache* | 1,339 | 24.8 | –26.8 |
| Majority | | 2,717 | 50.4 | N/A |
| Turnout | | 5,395 | 44.4 | +6.2 |
| Registered electors | | 12,171 | | |
| Conservative gain from Labour | | Swing | ▲26.8 | |

Benfleet (Hadleigh)
| Party | Candidate | Votes | % | ±% |
|---|---|---|---|---|
| Conservative | R. Williams* | 4,262 | 84.5 | +16.5 |
| Labour | C. Prentice | 783 | 15.5 | –16.5 |
| Majority | | 3,469 | 69.0 | +32.9 |
| Turnout | | 5,045 | 44.2 | +5.7 |
| Registered electors | | 11,434 | | |
| Conservative hold | | Swing | ▲16.5 | |

Benfleet (Thundersley)
| Party | Candidate | Votes | % | ±% |
|---|---|---|---|---|
| Conservative | J. Meggison | 3,540 | 75.5 | +36.9 |
| Labour | D. Nisbet | 1,151 | 24.5 | –33.0 |
| Majority | | 2,389 | 50.9 | N/A |
| Turnout | | 4,691 | 37.0 | +6.2 |
| Registered electors | | 12,721 | | |
| Conservative gain from Labour | | Swing | ▲35.0 | |

Canvey Island (East)
| Party | Candidate | Votes | % | ±% |
|---|---|---|---|---|
| Conservative | W. Ashworth | 2,541 | 70.6 | +12.0 |
| Labour | M. Luker | 1,056 | 29.4 | –12.0 |
| Majority | | 1,485 | 41.3 | +24.0 |
| Turnout | | 3,597 | 29.5 | –9.4 |
| Registered electors | | 12,251 | | |
| Conservative hold | | Swing | ▲12.0 | |

Canvey Island (West)
| Party | Candidate | Votes | % | ±% |
|---|---|---|---|---|
| Conservative | F. Wood | 2,010 | 46.9 | +8.6 |
| Labour | D. Shaw | 1,547 | 36.1 | –25.6 |
| Liberal | M. James | 727 | 17.0 | N/A |
| Majority | | 463 | 10.8 | N/A |
| Turnout | | 4,284 | 38.4 | +2.1 |
| Registered electors | | 11,179 | | |
| Conservative gain from Labour | | Swing | ▲17.1 | |

=== Chelmsford ===
Summary

Chelmsford District Summary
| Party | Seats | +/- | Votes | % | +/- |
|---|---|---|---|---|---|
| Conservative | 8 | ▲3 | 17,981 | 58.0 | +7.0 |
| Liberal | 0 | ▼1 | 7,352 | 23.7 | +13.2 |
| Labour | 0 | ▼2 | 5,460 | 17.6 | –21.0 |
| Independent | 0 | Steady | 199 | 0.6 | N/A |
| Total | 8 | Steady | 30,992 | 42.9 | +6.9 |

Division results

Chelmsford (East)
| Party | Candidate | Votes | % | ±% |
|---|---|---|---|---|
| Conservative | A. Gunn | 2,413 | 51.3 | +27.6 |
| Liberal | R. Battey* | 1,950 | 41.5 | –20.2 |
| Labour | P. Thompson | 337 | 7.2 | –7.4 |
| Majority | | 463 | 9.9 | N/A |
| Turnout | | 4,700 | 51.0 | +6.8 |
| Registered electors | | 9,230 | | |
| Conservative gain from Liberal | | Swing | ▲23.9 | |

Chelmsford (North)
| Party | Candidate | Votes | % | ±% |
|---|---|---|---|---|
| Conservative | J. Short | 2,656 | 46.4 | +6.1 |
| Labour | W. Landers | 2,241 | 39.1 | –20.6 |
| Liberal | W. Talley | 832 | 14.5 | N/A |
| Majority | | 415 | 7.2 | N/A |
| Turnout | | 5,729 | 40.9 | +3.3 |
| Registered electors | | 14,037 | | |
| Conservative gain from Labour | | Swing | ▲13.4 | |

Chelmsford (West)
| Party | Candidate | Votes | % | ±% |
|---|---|---|---|---|
| Conservative | R. Millard | 1,341 | 44.6 | –1.6 |
| Liberal | D. Ridgewell | 1,161 | 38.6 | N/A |
| Labour | P. Bermingham | 505 | 16.8 | –37.0 |
| Majority | | 180 | 6.0 | N/A |
| Turnout | | 3,007 | 41.6 | +2.9 |
| Registered electors | | 7,229 | | |
| Conservative gain from Labour | | | | |

Chelmsford Rural No. 1
| Party | Candidate | Votes | % | ±% |
|---|---|---|---|---|
| Conservative | D. Chatfield* | 3,314 | 75.2 | +0.6 |
| Liberal | D. Lansdale | 1,090 | 24.8 | N/A |
| Majority | | 2,224 | 50.5 | +1.3 |
| Turnout | | 4,404 | 41.6 | +11.7 |
| Registered electors | | 10,618 | | |
| Conservative hold | | | | |

Chelmsford Rural No. 2
| Party | Candidate | Votes | % | ±% |
|---|---|---|---|---|
| Conservative | P. White* | Unopposed | | |
| Registered electors | | 8,773 | | |
| Conservative hold | | | | |

Chelmsford Rural No. 3
| Party | Candidate | Votes | % | ±% |
|---|---|---|---|---|
| Conservative | H. How | 2,790 | 63.8 | +0.8 |
| Labour | H. Dempsey | 842 | 19.3 | –17.7 |
| Liberal | E. Burgess | 741 | 16.9 | N/A |
| Majority | | 1,948 | 44.5 | +18.5 |
| Turnout | | 4,373 | 44.1 | +9.4 |
| Registered electors | | 9,955 | | |
| Conservative hold | | Swing | ▲9.3 | |

Chelmsford Rural No. 4
| Party | Candidate | Votes | % | ±% |
|---|---|---|---|---|
| Conservative | B. Platt* | 2,210 | 68.1 | +10.7 |
| Labour | J. Bliss | 680 | 20.9 | –6.0 |
| Liberal | J. Gumbleton | 356 | 11.0 | –4.7 |
| Majority | | 1,530 | 47.1 | +16.6 |
| Turnout | | 3,246 | 48.2 | +5.6 |
| Registered electors | | 6,735 | | |
| Conservative hold | | Swing | ▲8.4 | |

Chelmsford Rural No. 5 (Great Baddow)
| Party | Candidate | Votes | % | ±% |
|---|---|---|---|---|
| Conservative | M. Foley* | 3,257 | 59.0 | +6.8 |
| Liberal | J. Beard | 1,222 | 22.1 | N/A |
| Labour | F. Tyler | 855 | 15.5 | –32.3 |
| Independent | W. Claydon | 191 | 3.5 | N/A |
| Majority | | 2,035 | 36.8 | +32.5 |
| Turnout | | 5,525 | 38.5 | +6.2 |
| Registered electors | | 14,376 | | |
| Conservative hold | | | | |

=== Colchester ===
Summary

Colchester District Summary
| Party | Seats | +/- | Votes | % | +/- |
|---|---|---|---|---|---|
| Conservative | 7 | ▲3 | 24,965 | 68.0 | +15.5 |
| Labour | 1 | ▼3 | 10,164 | 27.7 | –15.7 |
| Liberal | 0 | | 1,603 | 4.4 | +0.3 |
| Total | 8 | Steady | 36,732 | 40.9 | +2.3 |

Division results

Colchester No. 1 (East)
| Party | Candidate | Votes | % | ±% |
|---|---|---|---|---|
| Labour | J. Bensusan-Butt* | 1,802 | 51.9 | –12.1 |
| Conservative | G. Jefferies | 1,673 | 48.1 | +12.1 |
| Majority | | 129 | 3.7 | –24.2 |
| Turnout | | 3,475 | 41.3 | –1.1 |
| Registered electors | | 8,435 | | |
| Labour hold | | Swing | ▼12.1 | |

Colchester No. 2 (South)
| Party | Candidate | Votes | % | ±% |
|---|---|---|---|---|
| Conservative | E. Kent | 2,098 | 48.9 | +24.8 |
| Labour | A. Barker | 1,468 | 34.2 | –9.7 |
| Liberal | M. Gage | 726 | 16.9 | –15.0 |
| Majority | | 630 | 14.7 | N/A |
| Turnout | | 4,292 | 34.0 | –2.7 |
| Registered electors | | 12,658 | | |
| Conservative gain from Labour | | Swing | ▲17.3 | |

Colchester No. 3 (West)
| Party | Candidate | Votes | % | ±% |
|---|---|---|---|---|
| Conservative | D. Lamberth | 3,760 | 72.7 | +3.4 |
| Labour | Tim Oxton | 866 | 16.8 | –13.9 |
| Liberal | Martin Hunt | 544 | 10.5 | N/A |
| Majority | | 2,894 | 56.0 | +17.5 |
| Turnout | | 5,170 | 49.1 | +4.8 |
| Registered electors | | 10,542 | | |
| Conservative hold | | Swing | ▲8.7 | |

Colchester No. 4
| Party | Candidate | Votes | % | ±% |
|---|---|---|---|---|
| Conservative | E. Gawthrop | 2,640 | 65.0 | +17.1 |
| Labour | J. Osborn | 1,086 | 26.8 | –25.3 |
| Liberal | R. Baker | 333 | 8.2 | N/A |
| Majority | | 1,554 | 38.3 | N/A |
| Turnout | | 4,059 | 40.6 | –4.0 |
| Registered electors | | 10,018 | | |
| Conservative gain from Labour | | Swing | ▲21.2 | |

Colchester No. 5
| Party | Candidate | Votes | % | ±% |
|---|---|---|---|---|
| Conservative | M. Roots | 4,211 | 60.8 | +14.9 |
| Labour | G. Davies | 2,720 | 39.2 | –14.9 |
| Majority | | 1,491 | 21.5 | N/A |
| Turnout | | 6,931 | 38.2 | +5.7 |
| Registered electors | | 18,184 | | |
| Conservative gain from Labour | | Swing | ▲14.9 | |

Dedham
| Party | Candidate | Votes | % | ±% |
|---|---|---|---|---|
| Conservative | G. Hickson* | 3,578 | 84.6 | +14.0 |
| Labour | J. Hockenhull | 649 | 15.4 | –14.0 |
| Majority | | 2,929 | 69.3 | +28.0 |
| Turnout | | 4,227 | 42.7 | +5.2 |
| Registered electors | | 9,921 | | |
| Conservative hold | | Swing | ▲14.0 | |

Lexden
| Party | Candidate | Votes | % | ±% |
|---|---|---|---|---|
| Conservative | F. Thornton | 3,469 | 78.8 | +22.1 |
| Labour | B. Jones | 933 | 21.2 | –22.1 |
| Majority | | 2,536 | 57.6 | +44.2 |
| Turnout | | 4,402 | 38.2 | +0.9 |
| Registered electors | | 11,546 | | |
| Conservative hold | | Swing | ▲22.1 | |

Mersea
| Party | Candidate | Votes | % | ±% |
|---|---|---|---|---|
| Conservative | R. Fairhead* | 3,536 | 84.7 | +10.2 |
| Labour | P. Treacher | 640 | 15.3 | –10.2 |
| Majority | | 2,896 | 69.3 | +20.2 |
| Turnout | | 4,176 | 44.6 | +4.6 |
| Registered electors | | 8,590 | | |
| Conservative hold | | Swing | ▲10.2 | |

=== Epping Forest ===
Summary

Epping Forest District Summary
| Party | Seats | +/- | Votes | % | +/- |
|---|---|---|---|---|---|
| Conservative | 9 | ▲1 | 28,302 | 72.0 | +12.3 |
| Labour | 0 | ▼1 | 9,640 | 24.5 | –13.6 |
| Liberal | 0 | Steady | 1,375 | 3.5 | +1.2 |
| Total | 9 | Steady | 39,317 | 40.2 | +5.6 |

Division results

Chigwell (Buckhurst Hill)
| Party | Candidate | Votes | % | ±% |
|---|---|---|---|---|
| Conservative | N. McGreal | 2,421 | 69.5 | +1.3 |
| Labour | B. Mooney | 677 | 19.4 | –12.4 |
| Liberal | R. Eveling | 385 | 11.1 | N/A |
| Majority | | 1,744 | 50.1 | +13.6 |
| Turnout | | 3,483 | 39.8 | +11.8 |
| Registered electors | | 8,766 | | |
| Conservative hold | | Swing | ▲6.9 | |

Chigwell (Chigwell)
| Party | Candidate | Votes | % | ±% |
|---|---|---|---|---|
| Conservative | S. Barnett* | 2,934 | 84.3 | +1.2 |
| Labour | K. Wilkinson | 548 | 15.7 | –1.2 |
| Majority | | 2,386 | 68.5 | +2.3 |
| Turnout | | 3,482 | 38.4 | +15.1 |
| Registered electors | | 9,096 | | |
| Conservative hold | | Swing | ▲1.2 | |

Chigwell (Loughton North)
| Party | Candidate | Votes | % | ±% |
|---|---|---|---|---|
| Conservative | G. Claridge | 2,601 | 63.3 | +26.7 |
| Labour | F. Davis* | 1,506 | 36.7 | –26.7 |
| Majority | | 1,095 | 26.6 | N/A |
| Turnout | | 4,107 | 36.4 | +0.5 |
| Registered electors | | 11,301 | | |
| Conservative gain from Labour | | Swing | ▲26.7 | |

Chigwell (Loughton South)
| Party | Candidate | Votes | % | ±% |
|---|---|---|---|---|
| Conservative | L. Welch | 3,077 | 70.0 | +18.5 |
| Labour | H. Worby | 1,317 | 30.0 | –18.5 |
| Majority | | 1,760 | 40.1 | +37.1 |
| Turnout | | 4,394 | 36.6 | +2.6 |
| Registered electors | | 12,052 | | |
| Conservative hold | | Swing | ▲18.5 | |

Epping
| Party | Candidate | Votes | % | ±% |
|---|---|---|---|---|
| Conservative | R. Daniels* | 3,547 | 79.6 | +2.6 |
| Labour | I. Standfast | 910 | 20.4 | –2.6 |
| Majority | | 2,637 | 59.2 | +5.1 |
| Turnout | | 4,457 | 38.3 | +8.3 |
| Registered electors | | 11,686 | | |
| Conservative hold | | Swing | ▲2.6 | |

Epping & Ongar No. 1
| Party | Candidate | Votes | % | ±% |
|---|---|---|---|---|
| Conservative | G. Padfield* | 3,685 | 75.9 | +12.3 |
| Labour | B. King | 787 | 16.2 | –20.2 |
| Liberal | S. Ward | 382 | 7.9 | N/A |
| Majority | | 2,898 | 59.7 | +32.5 |
| Turnout | | 4,854 | 43.0 | +6.3 |
| Registered electors | | 11,287 | | |
| Conservative hold | | Swing | ▲16.3 | |

Epping & Ongar No. 2
| Party | Candidate | Votes | % | ±% |
|---|---|---|---|---|
| Conservative | J. Martin* | 3,553 | 80.3 | +17.3 |
| Labour | J. Pratt | 869 | 19.7 | –17.3 |
| Majority | | 2,684 | 60.7 | +34.7 |
| Turnout | | 4,422 | 42.0 | –0.8 |
| Registered electors | | 10,548 | | |
| Conservative hold | | Swing | ▲17.3 | |

Epping & Ongar No. 3
| Party | Candidate | Votes | % | ±% |
|---|---|---|---|---|
| Conservative | D. Jones* | 3,668 | 75.4 | +15.0 |
| Liberal | E. Bottomley | 608 | 12.5 | –6.6 |
| Labour | R. Humphreys | 588 | 12.1 | –8.5 |
| Majority | | 3,060 | 62.9 | +23.1 |
| Turnout | | 4,864 | 43.9 | +8.0 |
| Registered electors | | 11,105 | | |
| Conservative hold | | Swing | ▲10.8 | |

Waltham Abbey
| Party | Candidate | Votes | % | ±% |
|---|---|---|---|---|
| Conservative | H. Taylor | 2,816 | 53.6 | +1.9 |
| Labour | C. Hewins | 2,438 | 46.4 | –1.9 |
| Majority | | 378 | 7.2 | +3.9 |
| Turnout | | 5,254 | 44.1 | +1.3 |
| Registered electors | | 11,943 | | |
| Conservative hold | | Swing | ▲1.9 | |

=== Harlow ===
District Summary
| Party | Seats | +/- | Votes | % | +/- |
|---|---|---|---|---|---|
| Labour | 4 | ▼1 | 10,783 | 49.1 | –24.0 |
| Conservative | 1 | ▲1 | 8,468 | 38.5 | +15.6 |
| Liberal | 0 | Steady | 2,632 | 12.0 | +8.0 |
| Independent | 0 | Steady | 95 | 0.4 | N/A |
| Total | 5 | Steady | 21,978 | 39.1 | +4.4 |

Division results

Harlow (Great Parndon)
| Party | Candidate | Votes | % | ±% |
|---|---|---|---|---|
| Labour | E. Morris* | 2,936 | 45.8 | –25.8 |
| Conservative | K. Cheshire | 2,704 | 42.2 | +13.8 |
| Liberal | L. Swanton | 771 | 12.0 | N/A |
| Majority | | 232 | 3.6 | –39.6 |
| Turnout | | 6,411 | 38.8 | +6.6 |
| Registered electors | | 16,559 | | |
| Labour hold | | Swing | ▼19.8 | |

Harlow (Harlow & Mark Hall)
| Party | Candidate | Votes | % | ±% |
|---|---|---|---|---|
| Conservative | H. Dutton | 2,262 | 45.2 | +15.8 |
| Labour | S. Anderson* | 2,158 | 43.1 | –27.5 |
| Liberal | C. Bagnall | 589 | 11.8 | N/A |
| Majority | | 104 | 2.1 | N/A |
| Turnout | | 4,420 | 46.6 | +8.0 |
| Registered electors | | 10,747 | | |
| Conservative gain from Labour | | Swing | ▲21.7 | |

Harlow (Harlow Common)
| Party | Candidate | Votes | % | ±% |
|---|---|---|---|---|
| Labour | W. Gibson | 2,247 | 54.3 | –26.1 |
| Conservative | G. Groves | 1,445 | 34.9 | +15.3 |
| Liberal | P. Naylor | 354 | 8.5 | N/A |
| Independent | E. Meyers* | 95 | 2.3 | N/A |
| Majority | | 802 | 19.4 | –41.3 |
| Turnout | | 4,141 | 38.8 | +3.8 |
| Registered electors | | 10,700 | | |
| Labour hold | | Swing | ▼20.7 | |

Harlow (Little Parndon & Town Centre)
| Party | Candidate | Votes | % | ±% |
|---|---|---|---|---|
| Labour | G. Newport* | 1,427 | 50.7 | –10.6 |
| Conservative | G. Reynolds | 978 | 34.8 | +21.4 |
| Liberal | D. Eldridge | 407 | 14.5 | –10.8 |
| Majority | | 449 | 16.0 | –20.0 |
| Turnout | | 2,812 | 38.2 | –0.7 |
| Registered electors | | 7,374 | | |
| Labour hold | | Swing | ▼16.0 | |

Harlow (Netteswellbury)
| Party | Candidate | Votes | % | ±% |
|---|---|---|---|---|
| Labour | J. Desormeaux* | 2,016 | 55.9 | –22.2 |
| Conservative | C. Riley | 1,079 | 29.9 | +8.0 |
| Liberal | P. Ramsay | 511 | 14.2 | N/A |
| Majority | | 937 | 26.0 | –30.2 |
| Turnout | | 3,606 | 38.9 | +4.1 |
| Registered electors | | 9,286 | | |
| Labour hold | | Swing | ▼15.1 | |

=== Maldon ===
District Summary
| Party | Seats | +/- | Votes | % | +/- |
|---|---|---|---|---|---|
| Conservative | 3 | ▲1 | 6,154 | 64.9 | +10.8 |
| Labour | 0 | ▼1 | 2,204 | 23.2 | –8.9 |
| Liberal | 0 | Steady | 779 | 8.2 | –5.6 |
| Independent | 0 | Steady | 349 | 3.7 | N/A |
| Total | 3 | Steady | 9,486 | 44.4 | +8.2 |

Division results

Maldon
| Party | Candidate | Votes | % | ±% |
|---|---|---|---|---|
| Conservative | K. Nolan | 2,343 | 54.8 | +25.6 |
| Labour | D. Wimhurst* | 1,157 | 27.0 | –9.3 |
| Liberal | L. Bermingham | 779 | 18.2 | –16.3 |
| Majority | | 1,186 | 27.7 | N/A |
| Turnout | | 4,279 | 40.7 | –3.3 |
| Registered electors | | 10,525 | | |
| Conservative gain from Labour | | Swing | ▲17.5 | |

Southminster
| Party | Candidate | Votes | % | ±% |
|---|---|---|---|---|
| Conservative | D. Fisher* | Unopposed | | |
| Registered electors | | 11,467 | | |
| Conservative hold | | | | |

Tollesbury
| Party | Candidate | Votes | % | ±% |
|---|---|---|---|---|
| Conservative | E. Dalley* | 3,811 | 73.2 | +0.6 |
| Labour | S. Kelly | 1,047 | 20.1 | –7.3 |
| Independent | P. Baron | 349 | 6.7 | N/A |
| Majority | | 2,764 | 53.1 | +7.9 |
| Turnout | | 5,207 | 48.1 | +10.8 |
| Registered electors | | 10,833 | | |
| Conservative hold | | Swing | ▲4.0 | |

=== Rochford ===
Rochford District Summary
| Party | Seats | +/- | Votes | % | +/- |
|---|---|---|---|---|---|
| Conservative | 5 | ▲2 | 12,525 | 62.3 | +13.6 |
| Labour | 0 | ▼1 | 3,876 | 19.3 | –24.1 |
| Independent | 0 | ▼1 | 2,804 | 13.9 | +6.0 |
| Liberal | 0 | Steady | 910 | 4.5 | N/A |
| Total | 5 | Steady | 20,115 | 39.9 | +3.7 |

Division results

Rayleigh (North)
| Party | Candidate | Votes | % | ±% |
|---|---|---|---|---|
| Conservative | R. Foley* | 2,575 | 67.4 | +15.3 |
| Labour | S. Andre | 676 | 17.7 | –30.2 |
| Liberal | P. Hann | 568 | 14.9 | N/A |
| Majority | | 1,899 | 49.7 | +45.5 |
| Turnout | | 3,819 | 38.5 | +7.0 |
| Registered electors | | 9,913 | | |
| Conservative hold | | Swing | ▲22.8 | |

Rayleigh (South)
| Party | Candidate | Votes | % | ±% |
|---|---|---|---|---|
| Conservative | P. Elliott* | 2,187 | 51.5 | –0.6 |
| Independent | S. Silva | 1,117 | 26.3 | N/A |
| Labour | R. McCamley | 604 | 14.2 | –33.7 |
| Liberal | K. Saunders | 342 | 8.0 | N/A |
| Majority | | 1,070 | 25.2 | +21.1 |
| Turnout | | 4,250 | 41.7 | +6.4 |
| Registered electors | | 10,213 | | |
| Conservative hold | | | | |

Rochford (North)
| Party | Candidate | Votes | % | ±% |
|---|---|---|---|---|
| Conservative | T. Fawell | 1,994 | 54.2 | +17.7 |
| Independent | D. Wood* | 1,687 | 45.8 | +3.4 |
| Majority | | 307 | 8.3 | +2.4 |
| Turnout | | 3,681 | 35.7 | +6.1 |
| Registered electors | | 10,346 | | |
| Conservative gain from Independent | | Swing | ▲7.2 | |

Rochford (South)
| Party | Candidate | Votes | % | ±% |
|---|---|---|---|---|
| Conservative | H. Ellis | 2,779 | 65.7 | +18.7 |
| Labour | R. Oliver | 1,452 | 34.3 | –18.7 |
| Majority | | 1,327 | 31.4 | N/A |
| Turnout | | 4,231 | 44.3 | +3.5 |
| Registered electors | | 9,587 | | |
| Conservative gain from Labour | | Swing | ▲18.7 | |

Rochford (West)
| Party | Candidate | Votes | % | ±% |
|---|---|---|---|---|
| Conservative | J. Jones* | 2,990 | 72.3 | +15.6 |
| Labour | T. Madden | 1,144 | 27.7 | –15.6 |
| Majority | | 1,846 | 44.7 | +31.2 |
| Turnout | | 4,134 | 39.8 | +13.1 |
| Registered electors | | 10,413 | | |
| Conservative hold | | Swing | ▲15.6 | |

=== Southend ===
Southend District Summary
| Party | Seats | +/- | Votes | % | +/- |
|---|---|---|---|---|---|
| Conservative | 11 | ▲6 | 38,009 | 64.5 | +18.1 |
| Liberal | 2 | ▼1 | 11,542 | 19.6 | +0.9 |
| Labour | 0 | ▼5 | 9,329 | 15.8 | –18.8 |
| Independent | 0 | Steady | 80 | 0.1 | –0.2 |
| Total | 13 | Steady | 47,557 | 38.4 | +0.2 |

Division results

Southend No. 1 (Eastwood)
| Party | Candidate | Votes | % | ±% |
|---|---|---|---|---|
| Conservative | J. Innocent | 3,496 | 60.2 | +26.8 |
| Liberal | D. Evans* | 2,314 | 39.8 | –16.4 |
| Majority | | 1,182 | 20.3 | N/A |
| Turnout | | 5,810 | 43.9 | +2.0 |
| Registered electors | | 13,286 | | |
| Conservative gain from Liberal | | Swing | ▲21.6 | |

Southend No. 2 (Prittlewell)
| Party | Candidate | Votes | % | ±% |
|---|---|---|---|---|
| Liberal | J. Sargent* | 1,989 | 51.8 | –6.5 |
| Conservative | V. Smith | 1,852 | 48.2 | +25.7 |
| Majority | | 137 | 3.6 | –32.1 |
| Turnout | | 3,841 | 42.9 | –4.5 |
| Registered electors | | 8,991 | | |
| Liberal hold | | Swing | ▼16.1 | |

Southend No. 3 (Leigh)
| Party | Candidate | Votes | % | ±% |
|---|---|---|---|---|
| Liberal | M. King* | 1,699 | 48.7 | –15.8 |
| Conservative | T. Davis | 1,692 | 48.5 | +18.3 |
| Labour | E. Newman | 96 | 2.8 | –2.5 |
| Majority | | 7 | 0.2 | –34.1 |
| Turnout | | 3,487 | 48.0 | –6.3 |
| Registered electors | | 7,295 | | |
| Liberal hold | | Swing | ▼17.1 | |

Southend No. 4 (St Clements)
| Party | Candidate | Votes | % | ±% |
|---|---|---|---|---|
| Conservative | D. Atkinson* | 3,253 | 71.5 | +21.1 |
| Liberal | A. Crystall | 1,213 | 26.7 | –20.1 |
| Labour | E. Luker | 81 | 1.8 | –1.0 |
| Majority | | 2,040 | 44.9 | +41.3 |
| Turnout | | 4,547 | 59.2 | +2.0 |
| Registered electors | | 7,676 | | |
| Conservative hold | | Swing | ▲20.6 | |

Southend No. 5 (Chalkwell)
| Party | Candidate | Votes | % | ±% |
|---|---|---|---|---|
| Conservative | N. Harris* | 2,244 | 73.7 | +16.6 |
| Liberal | J. Keith | 515 | 16.9 | –14.8 |
| Labour | R. Terry | 206 | 6.8 | –4.4 |
| Independent | C. Smith | 80 | 2.6 | N/A |
| Majority | | 1,729 | 56.8 | +31.4 |
| Turnout | | 3,045 | 41.5 | +2.0 |
| Registered electors | | 7,363 | | |
| Conservative hold | | Swing | ▲15.7 | |

Southend No. 6 (2 seats)
| Party | Candidate | Votes | % | ±% |
|---|---|---|---|---|
| Conservative | R. Marriott* | 5,096 | 64.0 | +5.0 |
| Conservative | N. Clarke* | 5,073 | 63.8 | +4.1 |
| Liberal | M. Lubel | 1,791 | 22.5 | N/A |
| Liberal | V. Macfarlane | 1,738 | 21.8 | N/A |
| Labour | A. Metcalf | 1,159 | 14.6 | –28.9 |
| Labour | C. Newman | 1,057 | 13.3 | –24.5 |
| Turnout | | 8,499 | 38.1 | +7.8 |
| Registered electors | | 22,306 | | |
| Conservative hold | | | | |
| Conservative hold | | | | |

Southend No. 7 (2 seats)
| Party | Candidate | Votes | % | ±% |
|---|---|---|---|---|
| Conservative | S. Bull | 2,740 | 63.6 | +18.3 |
| Conservative | R. Richmond | 2,613 | 60.7 | +17.5 |
| Labour | W. Bowyer* | 1,685 | 39.1 | –18.5 |
| Labour | R. Copley* | 1,574 | 36.6 | –17.3 |
| Turnout | | 4,528 | 30.4 | –3.6 |
| Registered electors | | 14,895 | | |
| Conservative gain from Labour | | | | |
| Conservative gain from Labour | | | | |

Southend No. 8 (Shoebury)
| Party | Candidate | Votes | % | ±% |
|---|---|---|---|---|
| Conservative | D. Cotgrove | 2,199 | 67.8 | +20.7 |
| Labour | R. Pearson | 1,044 | 32.2 | –20.7 |
| Majority | | 1,155 | 35.6 | N/A |
| Turnout | | 3,243 | 32.6 | –3.6 |
| Registered electors | | 9,965 | | |
| Conservative gain from Labour | | Swing | ▲20.7 | |

Southend No. 9 (Thorpe)
| Party | Candidate | Votes | % | ±% |
|---|---|---|---|---|
| Conservative | H. Hill* | 3,470 | 85.8 | +3.7 |
| Labour | G. Caplan | 290 | 7.2 | –10.7 |
| Liberal | A. Summers | 283 | 7.0 | N/A |
| Majority | | 3,180 | 78.7 | +14.5 |
| Turnout | | 4,043 | 40.1 | +6.8 |
| Registered electors | | 10,087 | | |
| Conservative hold | | Swing | ▲7.2 | |

Southend No. 10
| Party | Candidate | Votes | % | ±% |
|---|---|---|---|---|
| Conservative | A. Fuller | 1,669 | 58.2 | +34.2 |
| Labour | R. Kennedy | 1,201 | 41.8 | –34.2 |
| Majority | | 468 | 16.3 | N/A |
| Turnout | | 2,870 | 28.3 | –7.1 |
| Registered electors | | 10,171 | | |
| Conservative gain from Labour | | Swing | ▲34.2 | |

Southend No. 11
| Party | Candidate | Votes | % | ±% |
|---|---|---|---|---|
| Conservative | A. Wright* | 2,612 | 71.7 | +17.6 |
| Labour | J. Hodgkins | 1,032 | 28.3 | –17.6 |
| Majority | | 1,580 | 43.4 | +35.3 |
| Turnout | | 3,644 | 31.4 | –0.9 |
| Registered electors | | 11,668 | | |
| Conservative hold | | Swing | ▲17.6 | |

=== Tendring ===
District Summary
| Party | Seats | +/- | Votes | % | +/- |
|---|---|---|---|---|---|
| Conservative | 8 | ▲2 | 22,307 | 68.7 | +14.7 |
| Labour | 0 | ▼1 | 7,337 | 22.6 | –13.3 |
| Liberal | 0 | ▼1 | 2,806 | 8.6 | +1.4 |
| Total | 8 | Steady | 32,450 | 37.3 | –1.9 |

Division results

Brightlingsea
| Party | Candidate | Votes | % | ±% |
|---|---|---|---|---|
| Conservative | G. Thomas | 2,598 | 52.8 | +26.8 |
| Liberal | T. Dale* | 1,543 | 31.4 | –13.5 |
| Labour | R. Barlow | 778 | 15.8 | –5.1 |
| Majority | | 1,055 | 21.4 | N/A |
| Turnout | | 4,919 | 40.8 | –4.5 |
| Registered electors | | 12,067 | | |
| Conservative gain from Liberal | | Swing | ▲20.2 | |

Clacton No. 1 (North)
| Party | Candidate | Votes | % | ±% |
|---|---|---|---|---|
| Conservative | C. Jessop | 2,344 | 52.5 | +5.5 |
| Labour | R. Smith* | 1,577 | 35.3 | –17.7 |
| Liberal | J. Snow | 541 | 12.1 | N/A |
| Majority | | 767 | 17.2 | N/A |
| Turnout | | 4,462 | 39.8 | +1.7 |
| Registered electors | | 11,265 | | |
| Conservative gain from Labour | | Swing | ▲11.6 | |

Clacton No. 2
| Party | Candidate | Votes | % | ±% |
|---|---|---|---|---|
| Conservative | H. Harvey-Williams* | 2,411 | 72.3 | +16.9 |
| Labour | T. Larkin | 926 | 27.7 | –16.9 |
| Majority | | 1,485 | 44.5 | +33.8 |
| Turnout | | 3,337 | 29.5 | –4.5 |
| Registered electors | | 11,340 | | |
| Conservative hold | | Swing | ▲16.9 | |

Clacton No. 3
| Party | Candidate | Votes | % | ±% |
|---|---|---|---|---|
| Conservative | J. Story* | 3,441 | 82.2 | +14.9 |
| Labour | F. Merrin | 745 | 17.8 | –4.5 |
| Majority | | 2,696 | 64.4 | +19.4 |
| Turnout | | 4,186 | 38.2 | –3.6 |
| Registered electors | | 11,002 | | |
| Conservative hold | | Swing | ▲9.7 | |

Frinton & Walton
| Party | Candidate | Votes | % | ±% |
|---|---|---|---|---|
| Conservative | H. Johnston* | 3,697 | 85.0 | +6.8 |
| Labour | S. Grant | 382 | 8.8 | –13.0 |
| Liberal | J. Russell | 270 | 6.2 | N/A |
| Majority | | 3,315 | 76.2 | +19.7 |
| Turnout | | 4,349 | 35.0 | +3.0 |
| Registered electors | | 12,456 | | |
| Conservative hold | | Swing | ▲9.9 | |

Harwich
| Party | Candidate | Votes | % | ±% |
|---|---|---|---|---|
| Conservative | W. Bleakley* | 3,044 | 72.8 | +14.6 |
| Labour | T. Rogers | 1,140 | 27.2 | –14.6 |
| Majority | | 1,904 | 45.5 | +29.2 |
| Turnout | | 4,184 | 37.4 | –6.8 |
| Registered electors | | 11,202 | | |
| Conservative hold | | Swing | ▲14.6 | |

Tendring Rural No. 1 (Tendring)
| Party | Candidate | Votes | % | ±% |
|---|---|---|---|---|
| Conservative | A. Moles* | 2,668 | 70.8 | +14.5 |
| Labour | G. Turner | 1,100 | 29.2 | –14.5 |
| Majority | | 1,568 | 41.6 | +28.9 |
| Turnout | | 3,768 | 38.5 | +0.4 |
| Registered electors | | 9,811 | | |
| Conservative hold | | Swing | ▲14.5 | |

Tendring Rural No. 2
| Party | Candidate | Votes | % | ±% |
|---|---|---|---|---|
| Conservative | H. Varney* | 2,104 | 64.8 | +14.4 |
| Labour | J. Young | 689 | 21.2 | –28.4 |
| Liberal | L. Brown | 452 | 13.9 | N/A |
| Majority | | 1,415 | 43.6 | +42.8 |
| Turnout | | 3,245 | 41.8 | +3.7 |
| Registered electors | | 7,795 | | |
| Conservative hold | | Swing | ▲21.4 | |

=== Thurrock ===
Thurrock District Summary
| Party | Seats | +/- | Votes | % | +/- |
|---|---|---|---|---|---|
| Conservative | 5 | ▲5 | 15,816 | 48.8 | +22.0 |
| Labour | 4 | ▼5 | 13,429 | 41.5 | –27.1 |
| Liberal | 0 | Steady | 2,555 | 7.9 | N/A |
| National Front | 0 | Steady | 556 | 1.7 | N/A |
| Independent | 0 | Steady | 38 | 0.1 | –4.6 |
| Total | 9 | Steady | 32,394 | 35.6 | +7.6 |

Division results

Thurrock No. 1 (Chadwell)
| Party | Candidate | Votes | % | ±% |
|---|---|---|---|---|
| Labour | A. Siddons* | 2,080 | 53.5 | –29.7 |
| Conservative | D. Hiscock | 1,581 | 40.7 | +23.9 |
| Liberal | J. Chitty | 228 | 5.9 | N/A |
| Majority | | 499 | 12.8 | –53.7 |
| Turnout | | 3,889 | 35.2 | +12.7 |
| Registered electors | | 11,060 | | |
| Labour hold | | Swing | ▼26.8 | |

Thurrock No. 2 (Grays Thurrock)
| Party | Candidate | Votes | % | ±% |
|---|---|---|---|---|
| Conservative | K. Cleverley | 1,371 | 66.7 | +34.7 |
| Liberal | P. Hillard | 683 | 33.3 | N/A |
| Majority | | 688 | 33.5 | N/A |
| Turnout | | 2,054 | 21.8 | –4.6 |
| Registered electors | | 9,538 | | |
| Conservative gain from Labour | | | | |

Thurrock No. 3 (Little Thurrock)
| Party | Candidate | Votes | % | ±% |
|---|---|---|---|---|
| Conservative | C. Thompson | 2,160 | 62.5 | +17.7 |
| Labour | B. Le Grys | 1,295 | 37.5 | –17.7 |
| Majority | | 865 | 25.0 | N/A |
| Turnout | | 3,455 | 46.3 | +10.7 |
| Registered electors | | 7,470 | | |
| Conservative gain from Labour | | Swing | ▲17.7 | |

Thurrock No. 4 (Orsett & Stifford)
| Party | Candidate | Votes | % | ±% |
|---|---|---|---|---|
| Conservative | D. Revell | 2,900 | 64.9 | +27.0 |
| Labour | J. Pollard* | 1,570 | 35.1 | –27.0 |
| Majority | | 1,330 | 29.8 | N/A |
| Turnout | | 4,470 | 44.7 | +12.8 |
| Registered electors | | 10,015 | | |
| Conservative gain from Labour | | Swing | ▲27.0 | |

Thurrock No. 5 (South Ockendon)
| Party | Candidate | Votes | % | ±% |
|---|---|---|---|---|
| Labour | G. Miles | 2,268 | 50.1 | –37.2 |
| Conservative | M. Lambert-Williams | 1,603 | 35.4 | +22.7 |
| National Front | D. Sweetman | 358 | 7.9 | N/A |
| Liberal | J. Norris | 296 | 6.5 | N/A |
| Majority | | 665 | 14.7 | –60.0 |
| Turnout | | 4,525 | 34.4 | +16.4 |
| Registered electors | | 13,189 | | |
| Labour hold | | Swing | ▼30.0 | |

Thurrock No. 6 (Corringham)
| Party | Candidate | Votes | % | ±% |
|---|---|---|---|---|
| Conservative | D. Hart | 2,166 | 52.1 | +17.4 |
| Labour | R. Goldsmith* | 1,579 | 38.0 | –27.3 |
| Liberal | A. Stone | 412 | 9.9 | N/A |
| Majority | | 587 | 14.1 | N/A |
| Turnout | | 4,157 | 43.1 | +11.3 |
| Registered electors | | 9,663 | | |
| Conservative gain from Labour | | Swing | ▲22.4 | |

Thurrock No. 7 (Tilbury)
| Party | Candidate | Votes | % | ±% |
|---|---|---|---|---|
| Labour | A. Jones* | 1,690 | 75.8 | +22.2 |
| Conservative | M. Stableford | 423 | 19.0 | N/A |
| Liberal | W. Wallace | 78 | 3.5 | N/A |
| Independent | P. Bryant | 38 | 1.7 | N/A |
| Majority | | 1,267 | 56.8 | +49.7 |
| Turnout | | 2,229 | 26.7 | –5.7 |
| Registered electors | | 8,384 | | |
| Labour hold | | | | |

Thurrock No. 8 (West Thurrock & Aveley)
| Party | Candidate | Votes | % | ±% |
|---|---|---|---|---|
| Labour | C. Bidmead* | 1,694 | 49.4 | –35.9 |
| Conservative | J. Dobson | 1,456 | 42.4 | +27.7 |
| Liberal | A. Fielder | 280 | 8.2 | N/A |
| Majority | | 238 | 6.9 | –63.6 |
| Turnout | | 3,430 | 35.6 | +9.1 |
| Registered electors | | 9,651 | | |
| Labour hold | | Swing | ▼31.8 | |

Thurrock No. 9 (Stanford-le-Hope)
| Party | Candidate | Votes | % | ±% |
|---|---|---|---|---|
| Conservative | W. O'Donoghue | 2,156 | 51.5 | +15.3 |
| Labour | J. Norris | 1,253 | 29.9 | –33.9 |
| Liberal | C. Farrand | 578 | 13.8 | N/A |
| National Front | B. Good | 198 | 4.7 | N/A |
| Majority | | 903 | 21.6 | N/A |
| Turnout | | 4,185 | 35.0 | +1.4 |
| Registered electors | | 11,945 | | |
| Conservative gain from Labour | | Swing | ▲24.6 | |

=== Uttlesford ===
Uttlesford District Summary
| Party | Seats | +/- | Votes | % | +/- |
|---|---|---|---|---|---|
| Conservative | 4 | Steady | 10,495 | 73.3 | +15.9 |
| Labour | 0 | Steady | 2,781 | 19.4 | –13.9 |
| Liberal | 0 | Steady | 1,038 | 7.3 | –2.0 |
| Total | 4 | Steady | 14,314 | 45.0 | +3.5 |

Division results

Dunmow
| Party | Candidate | Votes | % | ±% |
|---|---|---|---|---|
| Conservative | M. Davey* | Unopposed | | |
| Registered electors | | 9,077 | | |
| Conservative hold | | | | |

Saffron Walden
| Party | Candidate | Votes | % | ±% |
|---|---|---|---|---|
| Conservative | T. Collins* | 4,378 | 75.8 | +21.0 |
| Labour | G. Scrivener | 1,395 | 24.2 | –21.0 |
| Majority | | 2,983 | 51.7 | +42.2 |
| Turnout | | 5,773 | 46.5 | –0.6 |
| Registered electors | | 12,444 | | |
| Conservative hold | | Swing | ▲21.0 | |

Stansted
| Party | Candidate | Votes | % | ±% |
|---|---|---|---|---|
| Conservative | P. Wawn | 3,465 | 66.2 | +16.0 |
| Liberal | R. Wraith | 1,038 | 19.8 | –15.5 |
| Labour | R. Shaw | 734 | 14.0 | –0.6 |
| Majority | | 2,427 | 46.3 | +31.4 |
| Turnout | | 5,237 | 47.3 | +5.7 |
| Registered electors | | 11,095 | | |
| Conservative hold | | Swing | ▲15.8 | |

Thaxted
| Party | Candidate | Votes | % | ±% |
|---|---|---|---|---|
| Conservative | D. Golding* | 2,652 | 80.3 | +19.6 |
| Labour | J. Pratt | 652 | 19.7 | –19.6 |
| Majority | | 2,000 | 60.5 | +39.1 |
| Turnout | | 3,304 | 40.0 | +0.1 |
| Registered electors | | 8,302 | | |
| Conservative hold | | Swing | ▲19.6 | |
