= Nigger in the woodpile =

Expression meaning something suspicious or wrong

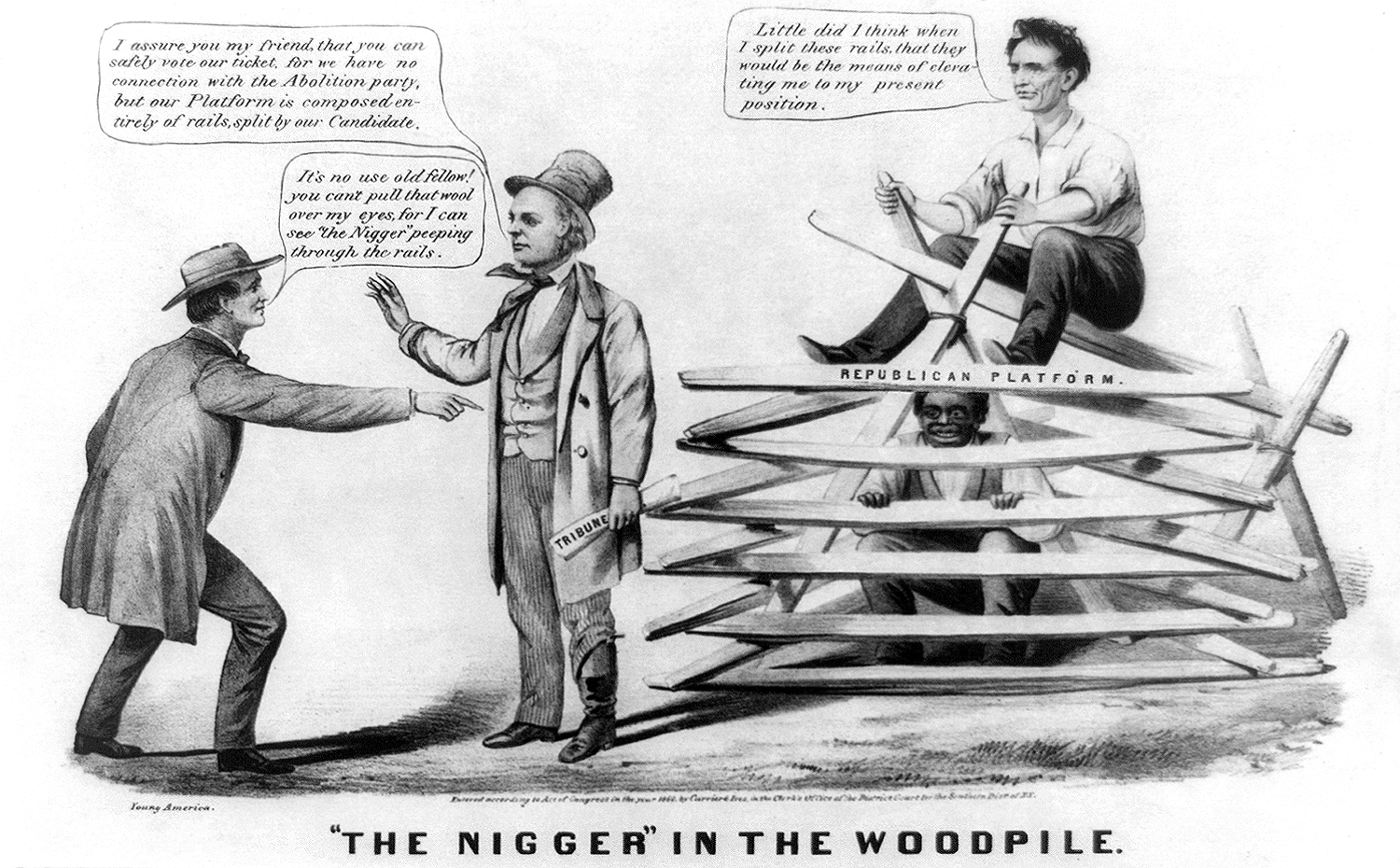
A Democratic Party parody, titled "'The Nigger' in the Woodpile", lampooned what they said were Republican efforts to play down the antislavery plank in their 1860 platform. Republican candidate Abraham Lincoln, who had worked as a laborer splitting wooden rails as a young man, is sitting on top of the pile. Illustration believed to have been drawn by Louis Maurer.

"Nigger in the woodpile" or "nigger in the fence" is a figure of speech originating in the United States meaning "some fact of considerable importance that is not disclosed—something suspicious or wrong".

Commonly used in the late 19th and early 20th centuries, its usage has since drastically declined, owing to its use of the ethnic slur nigger, and use of the phrase by public figures has often been criticized because of the usage of the slur in the term.

== Origin ==
The phrase means an unknown factor, something that causes things to turn out differently than would normally be assumed. Woodpiles used to be stacked loosely with spaces, to avoid rot (see illustration) and were presented by racists as natural hiding places for Black people, where they could either nap (fitting the stereotype of the lazy Black man) or spy on their White neighbors.

Another theory notes that the "fence" and "woodpile" variants developed about the same time in the period of 1840–1850, when the Underground Railroad was flourishing. The evidence is slight, but the theory presumes that they were derived from actual instances of the concealment of fugitive slaves in their flight north under piles of firewood or within hiding places in stone walls.

Another possible origin comes from the practice of transporting pulpwood on special railroad cars. In the era of slavery, the pulpwood cars were built with an outer frame with the wood being stacked inside in moderately neat rows and stacks. However, given the nature of the cars, it was possible to smuggle persons in the pile itself, possibly giving rise to the term.

An 1886 article in the San Antonio Light attributed origin of the "fence" variant to an 1840s horse race in Mississippi, during which a person was hidden in a fence next to the racetrack in order to scare a favorited horse during the race.

== Usage ==
The idiom was once common in literature and film, and has also appeared in musical lyrics.

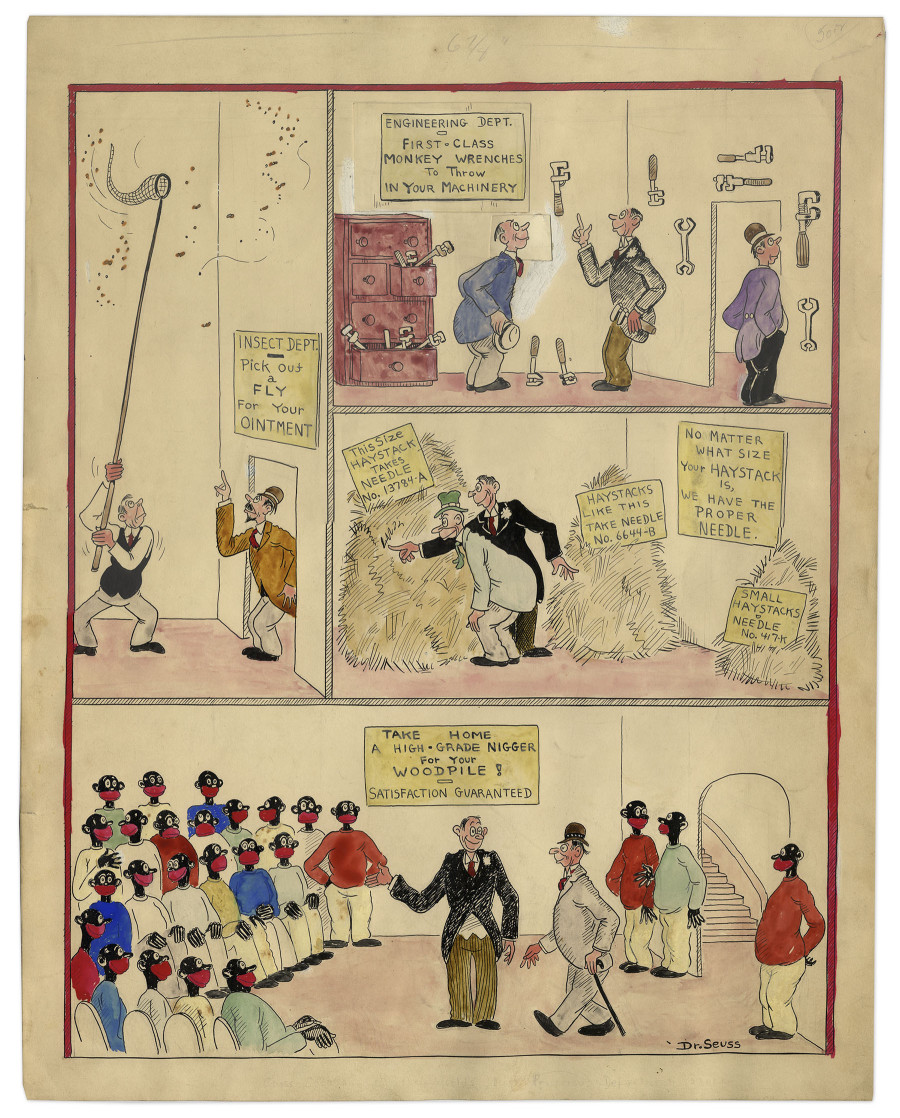
Dr. Seuss's cartoon "Cross-Section of The World's Most Prosperous Department Store"

Dr. Seuss used the term in a 1929 print cartoon "Cross-Section of The World's Most Prosperous Department Store", wherein customers browse through a department store looking for items to make their lives more difficult. The panels show a series of scenarios based on popular figures of speech: a man with a net trying to catch a fly for his ointment, another looking at monkey wrenches to throw into his machinery, one examining haystacks with matching needles, and finally a man looking at a selection of people—drawn with stereotypical Black features—for his woodpile.

An American film comedy titled A Nigger in the Woodpile was released in 1904. Other silent films used the phrase on intertitles.

A visual gag in the Looney Tunes animated cartoon Porky's Railroad from 1937 refers to the phrase.

In a 1936 Perry Mason novel reissued in 1988, The Case of the Stuttering Bishop, Mason says, "And, mind you, unless there is a nigger in the woodpile somewhere, the woman the bishop is inquiring about on the manslaughter business is the mother of the Brownley girl."

=== Contemporary use by public figures ===
The phrase declined in use during the 20th century, and now its occasional use by public figures has often been followed by controversy and apology. Examples include:

During BBC Sport's coverage of the 1990 FIFA World Cup, Sir Geoff Hurst, in discussion with Bob Wilson, used the expression while sitting next to Garth Crooks, a Black man.

In 1994, judge Inge Bernstein used the term in a summation to a Liverpool county court jury. She immediately apologised. The plaintiff, who was Black, brought a damages action to the Court of Appeal supported by Peter Herbert, the chair of the Society of Black Lawyers. The appeal was rejected in 1996, ruled as an inadvertent (but highly offensive and inappropriate) mistake which was immediately withdrawn, and one which did not refer to the plaintiff or prejudice the jury against him.

In July 2008, the leader of the Conservative Party, David Cameron, was urged by some Labour politicians to dismiss Conservative peer Lord Dixon-Smith, who said in the House of Lords that concerns about government housing legislation were "the nigger in the woodpile". Dixon-Smith said the phrase had "slipped out without my thinking", and that "It was common parlance when I was younger".

In July 2017, the phrase was again used by Conservative Party politician Anne Marie Morris who said that Brexit without a deal with the European Union was the "real nigger in the woodpile". She later said, "The comment was totally unintentional. I apologise unreservedly for any offence caused." However, she was suspended the same day by the party's chief whip, on the orders of the party leader, Prime Minister Theresa May. The Conservative Party whip was restored to Morris on 12 December 2017, one day before a crucial vote on the Brexit process. Although Morris voted with the Conservative Government, the Government was defeated by four votes.

In 2018, it was revealed that Irish race-car driver and commentator Derek Daly had used the phrase in a radio interview in May 1983. Daly explained he was a foreign driver now in America, driving for an American team, with an American crew, and with an American sponsor—and that if things did not go well, he would be the only nigger in the woodpile. His comment caused an immediate uproar from people listening in Gasoline Alley as they warned him of the volatility of that phrase. Daly apologized and said the phrase had been an Irish colloquialism, and was not intended as a racial slur. Once it was revealed, Daly lost his commentator job. His son, who had not been born at the time the comments were made, also lost his sponsor for the weekend.

In 2019, the Australian Communications and Media Authority (ACMA) ruled that radio station 2GB breached the Commercial Radio Code of Practice when the broadcaster Alan Jones used a "racially charged phrase" during a segment in 2018. ACMA received numerous complaints after Jones used the controversial phrase in August 2018, while discussing the looming second Liberal Party of Australia leadership spill. "The nigger in the woodpile here, if one can use that expression – and I'm not going to yield to people who tell us that certain words in the language are forbidden – the person who's playing hard to get is Mathias Cormann", Jones told listeners. ACMA found that, while the phrase was widely considered racist, its use in the broadcast did not likely incite "hatred", "serious contempt" or "severe ridicule". 2GB's management agreed the term would not be used on-air again.

In November 2019, a former Downing Street aide alleged that Andrew Mountbatten-Windsor (then entitled Prince Andrew, Duke of York), had used the phrase during a private meeting in 2012 about trade.

In June 2020, a city councillor in Taupō, New Zealand, was subject to official complaints and a code of conduct investigation after using the phrase in a council meeting.

In November 2021, the vice chairman of South Kesteven District Council in Lincolnshire, England, Councillor Ian Stokes, was suspended from his party and later resigned after using the phrase while chairing a governance and audit committee on 20 October. The meeting had been broadcast live on YouTube and sparked a petition calling for his resignation.

== See also ==
- Elephant in the room
- Wolf in sheep's clothing
