= Inge Bernstein =

English lawyer (1931–2022)

The Honorary Ingeborg Bernstein

Circuit judge (England and Wales)
- In office 1991–2001

Personal details
- Born: 24 February 1931; Vienna, Austria
- Died: 26 April 2022 (aged 91)

Ingeborg Bernstein (née Schwarz, 24 February 1931 – 26 April 2022) was an Austrian-born English circuit judge.

== Early life and education ==
Ingeborg Schwarz was born on 24 February 1931 in Vienna, Austria, to Anna and Herman Schwarz. Her mother died when Ingeborg was only two and she was raised by her father and her grandmother Regina Politzer. The family were Jewish and her childhood was affected by the increasing persecution. After Kristallnacht, her grandmother worked with a cousin, Lisl Herlinger, to find foster parents in Britain, and at the age of eight Ingeborg Schwarz left Vienna on a Kindertransport train and was taken in by Sarah and Eli Bernstein in Liverpool. She never saw her birth family again, learning of their deaths when she was fourteen. She was adopted by the Bernsteins.

Bernstein studied at Peterborough County School and St Edmund's College before moving to Liverpool and graduating from the University of Liverpool in November 1952.

== Career ==
From 1952 until 1991, she worked for the Liverpool Chambers (becoming a recorder in 1978 and head of the chambers in 1988). She was also a member of the Mental Health Act Commission from 1984 until 1986 and was president of the Mental Health Review Tribunal. From 1991 until 2001, she was a circuit judge.

In 1994, she used the racist phrase "nigger in the woodpile" in relation to two police officers in a summation to a Liverpool county court jury. She immediately apologised for the turn of phrase. However, the plaintiff Valentine Reid, a black man, brought a damages action to the Court of Appeal (Reid v Chief Constable of Merseyside), supported by Peter Herbert, the chair of the Society of Black Lawyers. The appeal was rejected in 1996, ruled as an inadvertent (but highly offensive and inappropriate) slip of the tongue which was immediately withdrawn, and one which did not refer to the plaintiff or prejudice the jury against him.

== Personal life ==
Bernstein retired in 2001. From 2001 to 2002, she was director of the Alternative Futures Group, a health and social care charity provider. Bernstein died on 26 April 2022, at the age of 91.
