= Rudy Narayan =

Guyanese lawyer and activist (1938–1998)

- Born: Rahasya Rudra Narayan; 11 May 1938; Essequibo County, British Guiana
- Died: 28 June 1998 (aged 60); London, England
- Education: Lincoln's Inn
- Occupation: Barrister
- Known for: Civil rights activist

Rahasya Rudra Narayan (11 May 1938 – 28 June 1998), commonly known as Rudy Narayan, was a barrister and civil rights activist in Britain. He migrated to Britain in the 1950s from Guyana.

Narayan was a compelling, rigorous, and eloquent advocate who specialised in trials arising from conflicts between police and ethnic minority communities and enjoyed much success. His trials included the Black Star Club, the Bristol Twelve, the murder of Donat Gomez, the Cricklewood Twelve, the Leeds Bonfire Eight, the Metro Four, the Newham Seven, the Scarman Inquiry and the Thornton Heath Sixteen. He defended some of the Black Panthers defendants accused in the riots of Handsworth, Brixton, and Bristol in the 1980s and other miscarriages of justice.

Many of his cases centered on police violence against the poor and vulnerable. He was considered to be a powerful speaker. Michael Mansfield stated that Narayan 'should have been the first black QC' and Lord Scarman called him 'one of the finest cross-examiners and advocates in the Commonwealth'. Narayan became aware that clients who asked for him were being told by their solicitors that he was not available. He protested and made public complaints against the racism that he saw in the legal establishment.

== Early life and education ==
Rudy Narayan was born in Essequibo County, Guyana (then British Guiana), to Sase Narayan and his wife, Taijbertie, the ninth of ten children.

He emigrated to Britain in 1953 and worked as a street cleaner, in a Brillo Soap Factory and in a Lyons Tea House, before joining the Royal Army Ordnance Corps. After seven years' service and promotion to the rank of sergeant, he left the British Army in 1965 and decided to become a barrister. He studied at Lincoln's Inn, where he was a founder and first president of the Bar Students' Union. He was called to the Bar in 1967 or later.

== Career ==
Narayan was a founder of the Afro-Asian and Caribbean Lawyers Association with Sibghat Kadri in 1969. This organisation was later renamed the Society of Black Lawyers. He set up the first voluntary legal advice centre in Brixton that led to the founding of the Lambeth Law Centre, was a part of the West Indian Standing Conference, and formed the South London West Indian Association. He was involved in establishing legal advice centres in Birmingham, Bristol, Cardiff, London, and Manchester.

After condemning solicitors, barristers, and judges in Birmingham as racist, he faced his first disciplinary hearing in 1974, accused of bringing the administration of justice into disrepute. He was reprimanded in 1980 for being discourteous to a judge, and then acquitted of professional misconduct in 1982, after claiming in a press statement that the Attorney General and the Director of Public Prosecutions were in "collusion with the National Front and fanning the flames of racial hatred" (although he was suspended for six weeks for other infractions). Nevertheless, complaints like his did lead to the creation of the Bar Council's race relations committee in 1984, and to an amendment to the Race Relations Act to prohibit race discrimination in the legal profession.

Narayan was elected as a Labour Party councillor to Lambeth London Borough Council in 1974, on which he served one term. He was selected as the Labour candidate for Birmingham Handsworth, but his selection was overturned when it was alleged that he made antisemitic remarks in one of his books. The selection was re-run, and Clare Short was selected in his place and won the successor seat of Birmingham Ladywood at the 1983 general election.

He was expelled from his chambers in 1984 after allegedly assaulting Sibghat Kadri, by then his head of chambers, at a conference. Narayan tried to requalify as a solicitor but failed the Law Society exams. He returned to the Bar, but was disciplined for overbooking himself by accepting briefs for trials that were to run simultaneously, and was suspended for two years. He stood as a parliamentary candidate at the 1989 Vauxhall by-election, protesting that a white Labour Party candidate was standing in a largely black constituency, but he attracted only 177 votes and Labour's Kate Hoey was elected.

In 1991 he went back to Guyana, where he had hoped to set up a legal aid centre, but returned to Britain in 1994. After further disciplinary hearings, he was disbarred in 1994 for professional misconduct. He was accused of inciting violence after speaking outside Brixton police station in 1995, following the death of Wayne Douglas, a 25-year-old black man, in police custody (later shown to have died due to positional asphyxiation ).

Narayan was a guest speaker at the 50th-anniversary celebrations of the NAACP's Legal Defence Fund in the U.S. The former U.S. Attorney General Eric Holder paid tribute to Narayan at a conference organised by the Society of Black Lawyers in 1999 in London.

The BBC programme Black Britain aired after his death in 1998 noted that Rudy Narayan was known for his internationalism and distinctive oratorical style. It described Rudy Narayan as one of the most charismatic and controversial figures in both Britain's black communities and its legal history.

He published several works on legal themes: Black Community on Trial (1976), Black England (1977), Barrister for the Defence (1985), and When Judges Conspire (1989). He was the first chairman of Lambeth Law Centre. He also co-wrote an eight-part drama series, Black Silk, that was loosely based on his life in which he was played by Rudolph Walker. It was broadcast in 1985 on BBC television.

== Death and legacy ==
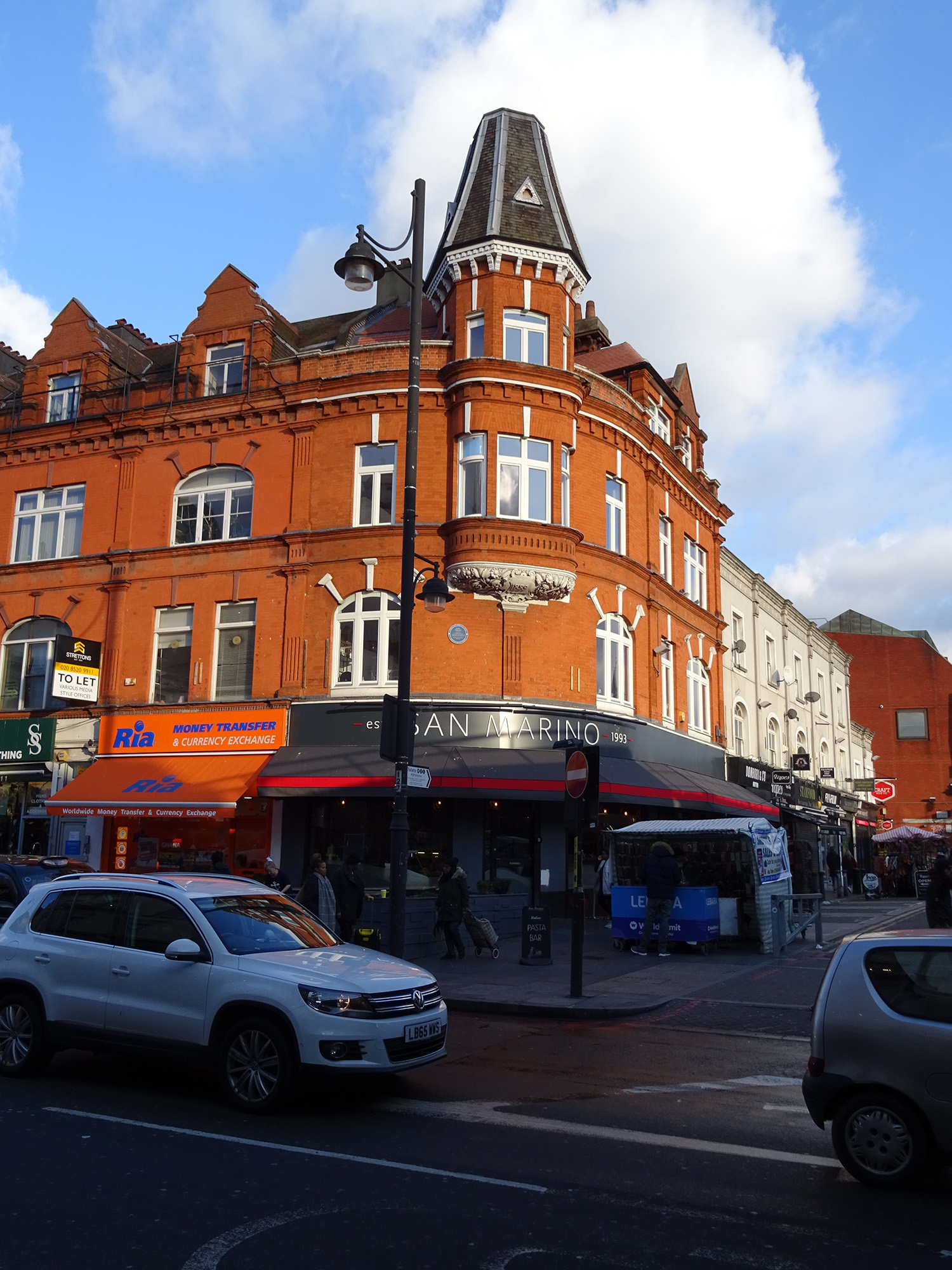
413A Brixton Road has a blue plaque honoring Rudy Narayan.

He died aged 60 of liver cirrhosis at King's College Hospital in Lambeth, London, following a lengthy battle with alcoholism. He is survived by three daughters.

On the day of his funeral, the South London Press reported that "Brixton stood still to pay its respects." There were poetry readings in different venues in Brixton and the Mangrove Steel Band played outside St. Matthew's Church where the funeral was held.

A plaque honouring Rudy Narayan was unveiled on 19 November 2010 at the site of his office at 413A Brixton Road in Brixton, Lambeth, South London. The plaque stated: "Rudy Narayan, 1938 – 1998, barrister, civil rights activist, community champion and 'voice for the voiceless', practised law here 1987 – 1994".

The Windrush Foundation held a public memorial for Rudy Narayan on 28 June 2018 as part of the Windrush 70 celebrations. There were tributes from Arthur Torrington of the Windrush Foundation, Yasmeen Narayan, Alex Pascall, Dennis Bovell, Keith Waithe, Linton Kwesi Johnson, Rudolph Walker, Peter Herbert and Marcia Willis Stewart. He was named a Windrush Champion by the Windrush Foundation in 2018. The Criminal Defence Team of Garden Court Chambers held an event 'Black Silk' as part of Black History Month 2024 that focused on the work and legacy of Rudy Narayan.

== Personal life ==
He married a doctor from Pakistan, Naseem Akbar, on 5 September 1969. They had two daughters – Sharmeen and Yasmeen – before divorcing. He then had a third daughter, Sita. He married Saeeda Begum Shah on 26 March 1988, but they subsequently divorced.

== Bibliography ==
- Black community on trial. London: Blackbird Books Ltd. 1976. ISBN 0901813028. OCLC 3515444.
- Black England. London, England: Doscarla Publications. 1977. ISBN 0950529605. OCLC 25275122.
- Black vs White: (Discrimination against immigrants). Delhi: Kunj Publishing House. 1980. OCLC 499442431.
- Passport to racism: a critique of the Conservative government's White Paper on British Nationality Law. London: New Life. 1980. OCLC 921030063.
- Barrister for the defence: trial by jury and how to survive it. London: Justice Books. 1985. ISBN 0950666424. OCLC 20428776.
- Blacks over England. London: Justice Books. 1995. ISBN 0951032410. OCLC 35738943.
