= Rabinder Singh (judge) =

British judge (born 1964)

The Right Honourable Lord Justice Singh PC
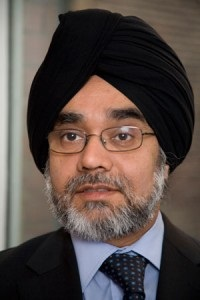

Lord Justice of Appeal
- Incumbent
- Assumed office 2 October 2017
- Preceded by: Sir David Kitchin

President of the Investigatory Powers Tribunal
- Incumbent
- Assumed office 27 September 2018

Justice of the High Court
- In office 2011–2017

Personal details
- Born: 6 March 1964 (age 62) Delhi, India
- Education: Trinity College, Cambridge; University of California, Berkeley; Inns of Court School of Law

Sir Rabinder Singh, PC (born 6 March 1964), styled The Rt. Hon. Lord Justice Singh, is a British Court of Appeal judge and President of the Investigatory Powers Tribunal, formerly a High Court judge of the Queen's Bench Division, a King's Counsel and barrister, formerly a founding member of Matrix Chambers and a legal academic.

== Early life and education ==
Rabinder Singh was born in 1964 in Delhi to a Sikh family. He grew up in Bristol and attended the private Bristol Grammar School. From an early age Singh had an interest in law and liked the thought of one day becoming an advocate. At Trinity College, Cambridge, he earned a double first in law in 1985. Between 1985 and 1986 Singh spent a year as a Harkness Fellow at the University of California at Berkeley studying for his LL.M. During his time at Berkeley he became interested in constitutional law, particularly misuse of power and how the law holds those in power to account. This interest was partly fuelled by the late Professor Frank Newman at Berkeley, a pioneer in the field of human rights law and by his studies on the United States Constitution at Berkeley. In 1988 he attended the Inns of Court School of Law to undertake his final examinations, and he was called to the Bar at Lincoln's Inn in July 1989.

== Career at the Bar (1989–2011) ==
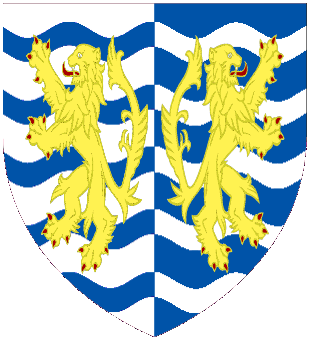
Arms, displayed at Lincoln's Inn

=== 4–5 Gray's Inn Square ===
Singh undertook pupillage at the barristers' chambers 4–5 Gray's Inn Square where he became a tenant in 1990. He remained there for 10 years specialising in public and administrative law, employment law, European Community law, human rights law, commercial law and media law. From 1992 to 2002 he was one of the Junior Counsel to the Crown (from 2000 on the A Panel). From 1997 to 2002 Singh was Additional Junior Counsel to the Inland Revenue.

=== Matrix Chambers ===
Singh, Booth and 5 other tenants from 4–5 Gray's Inn Square, together with 16 barristers from other chambers, set up Matrix Chambers in 2000. With the formation of Matrix, none of the five silks signed up to Matrix at the time was estimated to earn much more than £200,000 a year, Singh however was believed to be the biggest earner of them all. One senior clerk said: "The problem they will have is that Rabinder Singh is by far their biggest earner. He will be carrying the rent which could cause a lot of internal politics." Singh went on to be named the Barrister of the Year by the Lawyer Magazine in 2001 and was appointed Queen's Counsel in 2002. He was acknowledged as a Leading Silk in Administrative and Public law; Singh was described by Chambers & Partners Legal 500 2006 as being "known for his expertise in cross-disciplinary work" and as "one of the most impressive younger silks" in the area of Administrative and Public law. Singh was the Chair of the Bar Council Equality and Diversity Committee (Race and Religion) from 2004 to 2006. Also, from 2006 to 2008, Singh was the Chair of the Constitutional and Administrative Law Bar Association. In 2009 he was made a Bencher of Lincoln's Inn.

== Judicial career ==
Singh was appointed a deputy High Court judge in 2003. Aged 39 when he was appointed, he was thought to be the youngest judge to sit in the High Court. In 2004 he became a Recorder (part-time judge) of the Crown Court. His appointment as a judge of the Queen's Bench Division of the High Court was announced on 29 July 2011. The appointment took effect on 3 October 2011, following the promotion of Mr Justice Kitchin to be a member of the Court of Appeal of England and Wales. He is the first Sikh to be made a High Court judge, and wears a turban rather than a wig while presiding. Singh was sworn in as a High Court Judge at Royal Courts of Justice on Monday 10 October 2011.

A Ministry of Justice spokesperson said of Singh's appointment:

The Government wants to create a society of aspiration, where people of ability feel free to aim to reach the highest offices of our country, regardless of their background, race or gender. The appointment of Mr Rabinder Singh QC, a talented and highly respected barrister, to the High Court, represents a real landmark in the drive to create a more diverse judiciary which continues to attract the highest quality candidates.

— Legal Week

From 2013 to 2016 he was a Presiding Judge of the South Eastern Circuit and in 2017 he was the Administrative Court Liaison Judge for Wales and the Midlands & Western Circuits.

In 2016, Singh joined the Investigatory Powers Tribunal, and he was appointed President on 27 September 2018.

He was appointed a Lord Justice of Appeal in July 2017, the appointment taking effect on 2 October 2017. He was sworn in on 5 October 2017. He is the first person from any BAME community to be a member of the Court of Appeal. As is customary for judges of the Court of Appeal he was appointed by Queen Elizabeth II to the Privy Council.

== Academic career ==
When Singh returned to England from California in 1986, he became a law lecturer at the University of Nottingham for 2 years. In the late 1990s Singh was a visiting fellow at Queen Mary University of London. Singh was a visiting professor of law at the London School of Economics (LSE) from 2003 to 2009. In 2004 he was granted an honorary Doctorate of Laws by the London Metropolitan University. In 2007 Appointed Special Professor of Law, University of Nottingham. Singh delivered the annual LexisNexis Butterworths Lecture on Law and Society at Queen Mary University of London on 16 March 2011. The lecture, entitled 'The Changing Nature of the Judicial Process' examined what judges actually do in practice and how this has changed over the last 100 years. In 2016 he was elected as a visiting fellow at Lady Margaret Hall, Oxford.

== Public appointments and other positions ==
In 2000 Singh was appointed by then Foreign Secretary Robin Cook as 'Independent Monitor for Entry Clearance' between October 2000 and November 2002. The position was established in 1993 and requires a review of around 1000 randomly chosen entry clearance refusals without a right of appeal and looking at the overall quality of refusal decisions, paying particular attention to fairness, consistency and the procedures used to reach those decisions. He makes random checks on some 800-1,000 visa refusals a year to see whether decisions are consistent and fair, and makes an annual report to the Parliament of the United Kingdom suggesting any improvements he thinks necessary. Singh is the second person to hold the job – his predecessor was Dame Elizabeth Anson. Rabinder Singh QC was also an independent member on a three-strong panel commissioned in the wake of the race row which erupted on Big Brother UK 2007 where Jade Goody and fellow housemates were accused of racist bullying towards Indian actress Shilpa Shetty.

== Notable cases (as counsel) ==
- Representing the CND in 2002, when he unsuccessfully sought a declaration against the Prime Minister and others that it would be unlawful for Britain to go to war with Iraq without a fresh resolution from the U.N.'s Security Council.
- The Belmarsh case in 2004 where Singh successfully represented Liberty in the House of Lords against the indefinite detention without charge or trial of non-nationals suspected of terrorist activities.
- Successfully argued in the case of Ghaidan v Godin-Mendoza in 2004 that discrimination against same-sex partners in respect of inheriting the right to a rent-restricted flat was in violation of the Human Rights Act.
- Successfully represented Liberty and the Joint Council for the Welfare of Immigrants in 2005 in the case against the government over the refusal of benefits to refugees.
- Advising and representing the RSPCA in 2006 in their successful response to the claim that the Hunting Act 2004 contravenes the Human Rights Act or the European Convention on Human Rights.
- In 2006 successfully represented the nine Afghan asylum seekers who hijacked a plane at gunpoint to get into Britain that they should have been allowed to remain in the country on human rights grounds.
- In 2005, successfully represented the Al-Skeini family and other families of civilians killed during the British occupation of South East Iraq, arguing that the Human Rights Act applied extra-territorially.
- Represented Peter Herbert, the Chair of the Society of Black Lawyers in the Disciplinary Proceedings brought against him by the Bar Council. Peter Herbert had accused the Bar Council of 'institutionalised racism'. The Bar Council eventually dropped the disciplinary proceedings against him.
- Ahmed & Others v HM Treasury [2010] UKSC 2 (2010) Asset freezing orders pursuant to UN Security Council Resolutions. This case was also featured in the Channel 4 documentary 'Britain's Supreme Court', where Rabinder Singh QC can be seen giving oral argument before the United Kingdom Supreme Court.
- Acting on behalf of the Government in Hirst v UK (2005) on prisoner voting; S and Marper v UK (2008) on retention of DNA samples; and Goodwin v UK (2002) on the rights of transgender persons.
- Al-Skeini v UK (2011) on extra-territorial application of ECHR, representing families of civilians killed by British forces in Iraq.
- One of his final appearances at the Bar was to represent the family of Baha Mousa at the public inquiry conducted by Sir William Gage, which reported in 2011.

== Interests ==
Singh has an interest in Greek poetry. He was asked in an interview, "If you were to choose a profession other than law, what would it be and why?". He responded "One thing I would have liked to be is an academic specialising in Greek poetry. I love Greek poetry. I can read Ancient Greek but never had the chance to develop my interest." Singh is also a Fellow of the Royal Society of Arts. Singh has also expressed his views writing in The Guardian on how 'Asians should not be prejudged because of the way we look' following a personal experience on the London Underground following the 7 July 2005 London bombings.

== Publications ==
• The Unity of Law (2022) Hart Publishing, ISBN 978-1509949427

- JUSTICE/Tom Sargant Memorial Annual Lecture 2010: The UK Constitution: Time for Fundamental Reform?
- Co-author of Beatson, Grosz, Hickman & Singh, Human Rights: Judicial Enforcement in the UK (2008)
- Justiciability in the areas of foreign relations and defence: chapter in Shiner and Williams (eds), The Iraq War and International Law (2008)
- The 2007 Statute Law Society Lecture: Interpreting Bills of Rights [2008] Statute Law Review 82
- The 2005 MacDermott Lecture – The Use of Inter national Law in the Domestic Courts of the UK [2005] 56 NILQ 119
- Equality – the Neglected Virtue [2004] EHRLR 141
- Privacy Postponed? (2003) EHRLR Special Issue 12 (with J. Strachan)
- The Right to Privacy in English Law [2002] EHRLR 129 (with J. Strachan)
- Contributor, Privacy & the Media – the developing law (2002, Matrix)
- The Declaration of Incompatibility [2002] Judicial Review 237
- The Place of the HRA in a Democratic Society, in J. Jowell and J. Cooper (eds), Understanding Human Rights Principles (2001)
- Is There a Role for the Margin of Appreciation after the Human Rights Act? [1999] EHRLR 15 (with M. Hunt and M. Demetriou)
- Privacy & the Media after the Human Rights Act [1998] EHRLR 712
- The Future of Human Rights in the United Kingdom: Essays on Law and Practice (1997, Hart Publishing)

== See also ==
- Matrix Chambers
