= Peter Herbert =

Peter Herbert may refer to:

- Peter Herbert (cricketer) (born 1947), Australian cricketer
- Peter Herbert (lawyer), British barrister and political activist
- Peter Herbert (Royal Navy officer) (1929–2019)
