= 1989 Essex County Council election =

1989 UK local government election

← 1985	4 May 1989	1993 →

All 98 seats to Essex County Council 49 seats needed for a majority

	First party	Second party
Party	Conservative	Labour
Last election	45 seats, 39.8%	29 seats, 29.6%
Seats before	44	29
Seats won	57	26
Seat change	▲12	▼3
Popular vote	193,578	128,270
Percentage	44.2%	29.3%
Swing	▲4.4%	▼0.3%
	Third party	Fourth party
Party	SLD	Loughton Residents
Last election	23 seats, 29.2%	1 seats, 0.5%
Seats before	24	1
Seats won	14	1
Seat change	▼9	Steady
Popular vote	101,342	1,378
Percentage	23.1%	0.3%
Swing	▼6.1%	▲0.2%
- Results of the 1989 Essex County Council election.
Council control before election
No overall control
Council control after election
Conservative

The 1989 Essex County Council election took place on 4 May 1989 to elect members of Essex County Council in Essex, England. It was held on the same day as other local elections. 98 councillors were elected from various electoral divisions, which returned either one or two county councillors each by first-past-the-post voting for a four-year term of office.

== Summary ==
=== Election result ===
1989 Essex County Council election
Party	Candidates	Seats	Gains	Losses	Net gain/loss	Seats %	Votes %	Votes	+/−
Conservative	98	57	13	1	▲12	58.2	44.2	193,578	+4.4
Labour	98	26	1	4	▼3	26.5	29.3	128,270	–0.3
SLD	90	14	1	10	▼9	14.3	23.1	101,342	–6.1
Loughton Residents	1	1	0	0	Steady	1.0	0.3	1,378	–0.2
Green	15	0	0	0	Steady	0.0	1.3	5,654	+1.2
SDP	9	0	0	0	Steady	0.0	1.2	5,191	N/A
Independent	4	0	0	0	Steady	0.0	0.3	1,204	+0.1
Ind. Labour Party	1	0	0	0	Steady	0.0	0.2	1,045	N/A
Liberal	1	0	0	0	Steady	0.0	0.1	265	N/A
BNP	1	0	0	0	Steady	0.0	<0.1	146	N/A

== Division results by local authority ==
=== Basildon ===
Basildon District Summary
Party	Seats	+/-	Votes	%	+/-
Labour	5	▼1	16,209	36.8	–3.5
Conservative	4	▲1	17,999	40.9	+9.1
SLD	1	Steady	9,525	21.6	–4.5
Independent	0	Steady	196	0.4	N/A
SDP	0	Steady	123	0.3	N/A
Total	10	Steady	44,052	36.2	–1.8

Division results

Basildon Crouch
Party	Candidate	Votes	%	±%
SLD	Francis Bellard *	2,220	49.1	+17.3
Conservative	Donald Morris	1,756	38.8	−6.8
Labour	Margaret Davis	544	12.0	−10.6
Majority		464	10.3	
Turnout		4,520	43.5	
SLD gain from Conservative		Swing	▲12.1	

Basildon Fryerns
Party	Candidate	Votes	%	±%
Labour	Williams Archibald *	2,064	58.7	−12.5
SLD	John Smith	736	20.9	+7.2
Conservative	Brian Archbold	719	20.4	+5.3
Majority		1,328	37.7	
Turnout		3,519	34.2	
Labour hold		Swing	▼9.9	

Basildon Gloucester Park
Party	Candidate	Votes	%	±%
Labour	Madeline Costello	2,729	65.8	+0.3
Conservative	Stuart Allen	1,038	25.0	+6.5
SLD	Philip Jenkins	380	9.2	−6.7
Majority		1,691	40.8	
Turnout		4,147	34.6	
Labour hold		Swing	▼3.1	

Basildon Laindon
Party	Candidate	Votes	%	±%
Labour	Martin Oliver	2,229	54.6	+5.1
Conservative	William Lockhart	1,440	35.3	+15.7
SLD	Stuart Saunders	416	10.2	−20.7
Majority		789	19.3	
Turnout		4,085	36.4	
Labour hold		Swing	▼5.3	

Basildon Pitsea
Party	Candidate	Votes	%	±%
Labour	Angela Smith	2,631	56.9	−7.0
Conservative	Paul Cleland	1,614	34.9	+11.3
SLD	Linda Williams	378	8.2	−4.3
Majority		1,017	22.0	
Turnout		4,623	27.0	
Labour hold		Swing	▼9.2	

Basildon Vange
Party	Candidate	Votes	%	±%
Labour	Anthony Wright	2,413	63.5	−4.6
Conservative	Simon Ryder	1,058	27.9	+9.5
SLD	David Owens	327	8.6	−4.9
Majority		1,355	35.7	
Turnout		3,798	28.2	
Labour hold		Swing	▼7.1	

Basildon Westley Heights
Party	Candidate	Votes	%	±%
Conservative	Brinley Jones	2,501	46.2	+16.9
Labour	Charles Bidmead	1,823	33.6	−8.3
SLD	Ian White	971	17.9	−10.9
SDP	William Shelton	123	2.3	N/A
Majority		678	12.5	
Turnout		5,418	45.9	
Conservative gain from Labour		Swing	▲12.6	

Billericay North
Party	Candidate	Votes	%	±%
Conservative	Lilian Greenfield *	3,261	71.3	+5.4
SLD	Arthur Ferriss	724	15.8	−9.3
Labour	Harold Bruce	392	8.6	−0.4
Independent	Patricia Breadmore	196	4.3	N/A
Majority		2,537	55.5	
Turnout		4,573	36.2	
Conservative hold		Swing	▲7.4	

Billericay South
Party	Candidate	Votes	%	±%
Conservative	George Dighton	2,498	54.3	+11.4
SLD	Janice Morley	1,357	29.5	+2.1
Labour	Irene Harlow	747	16.2	+0.4
Majority		1,141	24.8	
Turnout		4,602	36.6	
Conservative hold		Swing	▲4.7	

Wickford
Party	Candidate	Votes	%	±%
Conservative	Iris Pummell	2,114	44.3	+15.4
SLD	Kay Battson	2,016	42.3	−12.7
Labour	Elsie Harrison	637	13.4	−2.7
Majority		98	2.1	
Turnout		4,767	39.7	
Conservative gain from SLD		Swing	▲14.1	

=== Braintree ===
Braintree District Summary
Party	Seats	+/-	Votes	%	+/-
Conservative	4	Steady	15,788	43.9	+3.1
Labour	2	Steady	12,267	34.1	+3.0
SLD	1	Steady	7,315	20.4	–7.7
Green	0	Steady	560	1.6	N/A
Total	7	Steady	35,920	39.9	–2.5

Division results

Bocking
Party	Candidate	Votes	%	±%
Labour	Peter White *	2,939	53.2	+10.0
Conservative	Graham Hutton	2,178	39.4	−0.8
SLD	Jayne Nicholls	411	7.4	−9.2
Majority		761	13.8	
Turnout		5,528	45.6	
Labour hold		Swing	▲5.4	

Braintree East
Party	Candidate	Votes	%	±%
Conservative	Robert Dixon-Smith *	2,832	52.5	+9.6
Labour	Richard Keeble	1,771	32.8	+1.7
SLD	John Ross	789	14.6	−11.5
Majority		1,061	19.7	
Turnout		5,392	39.3	
Conservative hold		Swing	▲4.0	

Braintree West
Party	Candidate	Votes	%	±%
SLD	David Grice *	2,765	45.3	−5.1
Conservative	Kenneth Brookman	2,437	39.9	+6.4
Labour	Peter Johnson	899	14.7	−1.4
Majority		328	5.4	
Turnout		6,101	44.0	
SLD hold		Swing	▼5.8	

Halstead
Party	Candidate	Votes	%	±%
Conservative	Joseph Pike	2,286	44.0	−2.8
Labour	Michele Jones	1,712	32.9	+0.1
SLD	Robert Bird	1,202	23.1	+2.8
Majority		574	11.0	
Turnout		5,200	39.6	
Conservative hold		Swing	▼1.5	

Hedingham
Party	Candidate	Votes	%	±%
Conservative	Geoffrey Waterer *	2,636	54.5	+3.6
Labour	John Kotz	1,238	25.6	+5.1
SLD	Roy Cavinder	959	19.8	−8.8
Majority		1,398	28.9	
Turnout		4,823	40.6	
Conservative hold		Swing	▼1.5	

Witham Northern
Party	Candidate	Votes	%	±%
Labour	Joan Lyon *	2,228	46.8	+4.1
Conservative	Roger Wacey	1,579	33.1	+2.0
Green	James Abbott	560	11.8	N/A
SLD	Terence Cane	398	8.4	−17.8
Majority		649	13.6	
Turnout		4,765	36.0	
Labour hold		Swing	▲1.1	

Witham Southern
Party	Candidate	Votes	%	±%
Conservative	Dennis Willetts *	1,840	44.8	+4.4
Labour	John Gyford	1,480	36.0	+4.0
SLD	Alfred Slowman	791	19.2	−8.4
Majority		360	8.8	
Turnout		4,111	34.0	
Conservative hold		Swing	▲0.2	

=== Brentwood ===
Brentwood District Summary
Party	Seats	+/-	Votes	%	+/-
Conservative	4	Steady	11,424	50.7	+4.7
SLD	1	Steady	6,460	28.7	–6.5
Labour	0	Steady	4,122	18.3	–0.5
Green	0	Steady	508	2.3	N/A
Total	5	Steady	22,514	40.4	–4.4

Division results

Brentwood Central
Party	Candidate	Votes	%	±%
Conservative	Margaret Hutton *	2,070	48.5	+5.6
SLD	Edgar Davis	1,471	34.4	−8.5
Labour	Cornelius Maxey	447	10.5	−3.7
Green	Roger Lankester	282	6.6	N/A
Majority		599	14.0	
Turnout		4,270	43.4	
Conservative hold		Swing	▲7.1	

Brentwood Hutton
Party	Candidate	Votes	%	±%
Conservative	Lee Green	2,559	62.8	+11.5
Labour	Malcolm Burgess	773	19.0	+2.7
SLD	Lachlan Mackenzie	743	18.2	−14.2
Majority		1,786	43.8	
Turnout		4,075	34.0	
Conservative hold		Swing	▲4.4	

Brentwood North
Party	Candidate	Votes	%	±%
Conservative	Leonard Jago *	1,874	53.8	+3.2
SLD	Pauline Myers	1,206	34.6	+1.4
Labour	Robert Gow	402	11.5	−4.6
Majority		668	19.2	
Turnout		3,482	36.7	
Conservative hold		Swing	▲0.9	

Brentwood Rural
Party	Candidate	Votes	%	±%
SLD	Derek Hardy *	3,040	53.1	+8.3
Conservative	Dennis Morton	2,083	36.4	−8.1
Labour	Richard Tattersall	338	5.9	−4.2
Green	John Brindley	226	4.6	N/A
Majority		957	16.7	
Turnout		5,687	45.8	
SLD hold		Swing	▲8.2	

Brentwood South
Party	Candidate	Votes	%	±%
Conservative	Janet Hayward *	2,838	56.8	+14.4
Labour	David Lewin	2,162	43.2	+7.1
Majority		676	13.5	
Turnout		5,000	42.0	
Conservative hold		Swing	▲3.7	

=== Castle Point ===
Castle Point District Summary
Party	Seats	+/-	Votes	%	+/-
Conservative	6	▲1	13,777	59.6	+9.5
Labour	0	▼1	6,792	29.4	–2.3
SLD	0	Steady	2,040	8.8	–9.5
Green	0	Steady	511	2.2	N/A
Total	6	Steady	23,120	36.5	+2.2

Division results

Benfleet
Party	Candidate	Votes	%	±%
Conservative	Jillian Reeves *	2,098	61.2	+5.3
Labour	Brian Wilson	897	26.2	+2.4
SLD	Timothy Atkins	434	12.7	−7.6
Majority		1,201	35.0	
Turnout		3,429	34.7	
Conservative hold		Swing	▲1.5	

Canvey Island East
Party	Candidate	Votes	%	±%
Conservative	Harold King	2,802	57.6	+17.1
Labour	John Payne	1,552	31.9	−8.9
Green	Derek Easton	511	10.5	N/A
Majority		1,250	25.7	
Turnout		4,865	33.7	
Conservative gain from Labour		Swing	▲13.0	

Canvey Island West
Party	Candidate	Votes	%	±%
Conservative	Raymond Howard *	2,662	57.2	+11.9
Labour	Dorothy Shaw	1,617	34.7	−7.9
SLD	David Ford	377	8.1	−3.9
Majority		1,045	22.4	
Turnout		4,656	34.5	
Conservative hold		Swing	▲9.9	

Great Tarpots
Party	Candidate	Votes	%	±%
Conservative	William Brum *	1,827	54.1	+10.2
Labour	Ashley Final	1,125	33.3	−4.4
SLD	Kenneth Miller	426	12.6	−5.9
Majority		702	20.8	
Turnout		5,039	30.6	
Conservative hold		Swing	▲7.3	

Hadleigh
Party	Candidate	Votes	%	±%
Conservative	Ronald Williams *	2,355	66.5	+2.7
Labour	Joy Nisbet	773	21.8	+5.1
SLD	Carole Newton	416	11.7	−7.8
Majority		1,582	44.6	
Turnout		3,544	38.5	
Conservative hold		Swing	▼1.2	

Thundersley
Party	Candidate	Votes	%	±%
Conservative	Joseph Gazzard *	2,033	62.6	+10.1
Labour	June Turner	828	25.5	−0.1
SLD	Robert Patman	387	11.9	−10.1
Majority		1,205	37.1	
Turnout		3,248	33.0	
Conservative hold		Swing	▲5.1	

=== Chelmsford ===
Chelmsford District Summary
Party	Seats	+/-	Votes	%	+/-
Conservative	8	▲4	21,695	45.5	+4.5
SLD	1	▼4	15,081	31.6	–12.0
Labour	0	Steady	7,340	15.4	±0.0
Green	0	Steady	3,374	7.1	N/A
SDP	0	Steady	193	0.4	N/A
Total	9	Steady	47,683	40.9	±0.0

Division results

Broomfield & Writtle
Party	Candidate	Votes	%	±%
Conservative	Michael Rose *	2,111	55.8	+3.1
Labour	Douglas Shinn	753	19.9	−0.1
SLD	Madeline Sinclair	512	13.5	−13.9
Green	James Ritchie	409	10.8	N/A
Majority		1,358	35.9	
Turnout		3,785	37.8	
Conservative hold		Swing	▲1.6	

Chelmsford East
Party	Candidate	Votes	%	±%
Conservative	David Kimberlin	2,725	46.5	+5.1
SLD	Wilfred Davey	2,075	35.4	−9.2
Labour	Guy Shearwood	620	10.6	−3.4
Green	Nigel Bedrock	437	7.5	N/A
Majority		650	11.1	
Turnout		5,857	48.2	
Conservative gain from SLD		Swing	▲7.2	

Chelmsford North
Party	Candidate	Votes	%	±%
Conservative	Kathleen Pauley	1,858	34.6	+8.0
SLD	Thomas Smith-Hughes *	1,657	30.8	−19.2
Labour	Roy Chad	1,613	30.0	+6.6
Green	Judith Ritchie	247	4.6	N/A
Majority		201	3.7	
Turnout		5,375	45.9	
Conservative gain from SLD		Swing	▲13.6	

Chelmsford South
Party	Candidate	Votes	%	±%
Conservative	Vernon Makin	1,813	40.0	+3.5
SLD	Robert Harmer *	1,783	39.3	−12.3
Labour	Antony Scammell	521	11.5	−0.4
Green	Carol Mills	416	9.2	N/A
Majority		30	0.7	
Turnout		4,533	40.3	
Conservative gain from SLD		Swing	▲7.9	

Chelmsford West
Party	Candidate	Votes	%	±%
Conservative	David Lee	1,415	31.4	+2.9
Labour	Bill Wright	1,413	31.4	+5.4
SLD	George Allen *	1,193	26.5	−19.0
Green	Andrew Simms	293	6.5	N/A
SDP	Betty Perry	193	4.3	N/A
Majority		2	0.0	
Turnout		4,507	45.6	
Conservative gain from SLD		Swing	▼1.3	

Great Baddow
Party	Candidate	Votes	%	±%
SLD	Joan Beard *	2,556	47.8	−7.5
Conservative	John Flack	2,053	38.4	+4.2
Labour	Keith Day	456	8.5	−2.0
Green	Angela Thomson	286	5.3	N/A
Majority		503	9.4	
Turnout		5,351	49.2	
SLD hold		Swing	▼5.9	

Springfield
Party	Candidate	Votes	%	±%
Conservative	Peter Martin	3,510	51.4	+4.4
SLD	Richard Derrick	2,130	31.2	−12.4
Labour	Edmund Cawston	709	10.4	+1.0
Green	Jennifer Scholfield	485	7.1	N/A
Majority		1,380	20.2	
Turnout		6,834	38.7	
Conservative hold		Swing	▲8.4	

Stock
Party	Candidate	Votes	%	±%
Conservative	Paul White *	3,209	59.5	+8.6
SLD	Marie Wolfe	1,013	18.8	−12.9
Labour	Richard Elliott	788	14.6	−2.7
Green	Nicholas Wallbank	385	7.1	N/A
Majority		2,196	40.7	
Turnout		5,395	37.4	
Conservative hold		Swing	▲10.8	

Woodham Ferrers & Danbury
Party	Candidate	Votes	%	±%
Conservative	Eileen Mickleborough	3,001	49.6	+2.4
SLD	Patricia Hughes	2,162	35.8	−6.5
Labour	Dennis Perkins	467	7.7	−2.8
Green	Brian Littlechild	416	6.9	N/A
Majority		839	13.9	
Turnout		6,046	32.2	
Conservative hold		Swing	▲4.5	

=== Colchester ===
District Summary
Party	Seats	+/-	Votes	%	+/-
Conservative	6	▲1	17,871	44.1	+4.3
Labour	2	▲1	10,320	25.5	–0.8
SLD	1	▼2	9,960	24.6	–9.3
SDP	0	Steady	1,675	4.1	N/A
Green	0	Steady	369	0.9	N/A
Liberal	0	Steady	265	0.7	N/A
Independent	0	Steady	54	0.1	N/A
Total	9	Steady	40,514	36.6	–1.7

Division results

Constable
Party	Candidate	Votes	%	±%
Conservative	Anthony Clover *	2,812	63.2	+2.7
SLD	Julie Brice	1,064	23.9	−1.4
Labour	Lucy Wood	572	12.9	−2.3
Majority		1,748	39.3	
Turnout		4,448	41.9	
Conservative hold		Swing	▲2.1	

Drury
Party	Candidate	Votes	%	±%
Conservative	Derek Lamberth *	2,837	48.2	+3.1
SLD	Cyril Williamson	2,294	39.0	−3.4
Labour	Maureen Lee	756	12.8	+0.3
Majority		543	9.2	
Turnout		5,887	45.6	
Conservative hold		Swing	▲3.3	

Maypole
Party	Candidate	Votes	%	±%
SLD	Patricia Pascoe *	1,676	41.3	−2.1
Labour	Donald Quinn	1,431	35.2	−4.4
Conservative	John Parsons	954	23.5	+6.5
Majority		245	6.1	
Turnout		4,061	32.5	
SLD hold		Swing	▲1.2	

Mersea and Stanway
Party	Candidate	Votes	%	±%
Conservative	Richard Fairhead *	3,408	61.2	+1.6
SLD	Angela Fielder	1,372	24.6	+0.5
Labour	Tim Young	791	14.2	−2.0
Majority		2,036	36.6	
Turnout		5,571	38.7	
Conservative hold		Swing	▲0.6	

Old Heath
Party	Candidate	Votes	%	±%
Labour	Michael Macneil	1,683	35.9	+0.9
SLD	Ann Stevens *	1,674	35.7	−9.2
Conservative	Sandra Rae	907	19.4	−0.2
Green	Charles Bush	369	7.9	N/A
Independent	David Smith	54	1.2	N/A
Majority		9	0.2	
Turnout		4,687	40.1	
Labour gain from SLD		Swing	▲5.1	

Park
Party	Candidate	Votes	%	±%
Conservative	Jeremy Lucas	1,823	44.8	+5.1
Labour	Roger Turp	1,008	24.8	−2.1
SLD	Phillip Holden	971	23.9	−9.5
Liberal	Richard Wilson	265	6.5	N/A
Majority		815	20.0	
Turnout		4,067	38.2	
Conservative hold		Swing	▲3.6	

Parsons Heath
Party	Candidate	Votes	%	±%
Conservative	Roger Lord	1,760	37.8	+5.0
SDP	Alan Hayman *	1,675	36.0	N/A
Labour	Robert Newman	1,219	26.2	−5.4
Majority		85	1.8	
Turnout		4,654	34.5	
Conservative gain from SLD				

Tiptree
Party	Candidate	Votes	%	±%
Conservative	Edmund Peel *	1,909	60.8	+11.5
Labour	David Brede	705	22.4	+4.2
SLD	Irene Brady	527	16.8	−16.0
Majority		1,204	38.4	
Turnout		3,141	26.6	
Conservative hold		Swing	▲3.7	

Wivenhoe St Andrew
Party	Candidate	Votes	%	±%
Labour	Brian Stapleton *	2,155	53.9	+6.5
Conservative	Christopher Thompson	1,461	36.5	+1.1
SLD	Raymond Gamble	382	9.6	−7.6
Majority		694	17.4	
Turnout		3,998	33.0	
Labour hold		Swing	▲2.7	

=== Epping Forest ===
Epping Forest District Summary
Party	Seats	+/-	Votes	%	+/-
Conservative	5	Steady	15,528	47.8	+3.8
Labour	2	Steady	8,885	27.3	–0.3
Loughton Residents	1	Steady	1,378	4.2	–2.8
SLD	0	Steady	4,732	14.6	–6.0
SDP	0	Steady	1,838	5.7	N/A
BNP	0	Steady	146	0.4	N/A
Total	8	Steady	32,507	32.6	–4.7

Division results

Buckhurst Hill
Party	Candidate	Votes	%	±%
Conservative	Bernard Cox *	1,649	42.6	−2.3
SDP	Stephen Robinson	1,054	27.2	N/A
SLD	Janice Lowe	737	19.0	−18.7
Labour	Angela Ayre	431	11.1	−6.2
Majority		595	15.4	
Turnout		3,871	36.1	
Conservative hold		Swing	▼14.8	

Chigwell
Party	Candidate	Votes	%	±%
Conservative	Anthony Twynham	1,781	58.4	+10.1
SLD	Sandra Anderson	910	29.8	−13.9
Labour	Alistair Alexander	212	6.9	−1.1
SDP	Michael Austin	148	4.9	N/A
Majority		871	28.5	
Turnout		3,051	32.3	
Conservative hold		Swing	▲12.0	

Epping
Party	Candidate	Votes	%	±%
Conservative	Dennis Ramshaw	1,785	46.1	−1.7
SLD	Susan Mann	1,240	32.0	+4.1
Labour	Ian Standfast	588	15.2	−9.0
SDP	George Dunseath	261	6.7	N/A
Majority		545	14.1	
Turnout		3,874	32.1	
Conservative hold		Swing	▼2.9	

Loughton St. Johns
Party	Candidate	Votes	%	±%
Labour	Frank Davis *	1,537	46.7	+5.8
Conservative	John Pledge	1,208	36.7	+8.0
SLD	Gary Anderson	258	7.8	+0.7
BNP	Robert Jarvis	146	4.4	N/A
SDP	Simon Bone	144	4.4	N/A
Majority		329	10.0	
Turnout		3,293	33.2	
Labour hold		Swing	▲1.1	

Loughton St. Marys
Party	Candidate	Votes	%	±%
Loughton Residents	Sidney Webb *	1,378	34.2	−4.5
Labour	Joan Ormston	1,334	33.2	+0.6
Conservative	John Martin	1,312	32.6	+3.9
Majority		44	1.1	
Turnout		3,293	38.4	
Loughton Residents hold		Swing	▼2.6	

North Weald & Nazeing
Party	Candidate	Votes	%	±%
Conservative	Ian Abbey *	2,612	70.7	+12.9
Labour	David Mills	660	17.9	+1.2
SLD	Stanley Ward	423	11.4	−9.9
Majority		1,952	52.8	
Turnout		3,695	34.8	
Conservative hold		Swing	▲5.9	

Ongar
Party	Candidate	Votes	%	±%
Conservative	Gerard McEwan	2,931	51.1	+2.3
Labour	Ronald Barnes	1,848	32.2	+12.7
SLD	Douglas Kelly	954	16.6	−14.2
Majority		1,083	18.9	
Turnout		5,733	43.2	
Conservative hold		Swing	▼5.2	

Waltham Abbey
Party	Candidate	Votes	%	±%
Labour	Cyril Hewins *	2,275	45.8	−9.7
Conservative	Elizabeth Webster	2,250	45.3	+0.8
SDP	Christine Barrett	231	4.7	N/A
SLD	Christine Bartrip	210	4.2	N/A
Majority		25	0.5	
Turnout		4,966	34.9	
Labour hold		Swing	▼5.3	

=== Harlow ===
Harlow District Summary
Party	Seats	+/-	Votes	%	+/-
Labour	4	▼1	13,426	59.2	+0.2
Conservative	1	▲1	6,433	28.4	+10.2
SLD	0	Steady	2,829	12.5	–10.3
Total	5	Steady	22,688	39.2	+1.0

Division results

Great Parndon
Party	Candidate	Votes	%	±%
Conservative	David Messer	2,404	47.7	+15.5
Labour	Sidney Warner *	2,161	42.9	−7.4
SLD	Peter Barton	474	9.4	−8.2
Majority		243	4.8	
Turnout		5,039	39.1	
Conservative gain from Labour		Swing	▲11.5	

Harlow & Mark Hall
Party	Candidate	Votes	%	±%
Labour	Sonia Anderson *	2,958	62.8	+5.5
Conservative	Simon Carter	1,440	30.6	+5.9
SLD	Douglas Collins	310	6.6	−11.3
Majority		1,518	32.2	
Turnout		4,708	43.9	
Labour hold		Swing	▼0.2	

Harlow Common
Party	Candidate	Votes	%	±%
Labour	William Gibson *	2,401	55.0	+1.5
SLD	Ian Myers	1,176	26.9	−19.6
Conservative	Guy Mitchinson	789	18.1	N/A
Majority		1,225	28.1	
Turnout		4,366	39.3	
Labour hold		Swing	▲10.6	

Little Parndon & Town Centre
Party	Candidate	Votes	%	±%
Labour	Edith Morris *	2,638	65.4	±0.0
Conservative	Leslie Atkins	945	23.4	+6.0
SLD	Lorna Spenceley	451	11.2	−6.1
Majority		1,693	42.0	
Turnout		4,034	37.1	
Labour hold		Swing	▼3.0	

Netteswellbury
Party	Candidate	Votes	%	±%
Labour	Robert Guy *	3,268	72.0	+2.2
Conservative	Sylvia Cross	855	18.8	+3.0
SLD	Valerie Scott	418	9.2	−5.3
Majority		2,413	53.1	
Turnout		4,541	37.1	
Labour hold		Swing	▼0.4	

=== Maldon ===
Maldon District Summary
Party	Seats	+/-	Votes	%	+/-
Conservative	3	▲1	7,909	57.1	+10.5
SLD	0	▼1	3,590	25.9	–10.8
Labour	0	Steady	2,357	17.0	+0.3
Total	3	Steady	13,856	34.0	–0.9

Division results

Maldon
Party	Candidate	Votes	%	±%
Conservative	Kathleen Nolan *	2,649	56.9	+9.6
SLD	Richard Hornett	1,026	22.0	−9.1
Labour	David Hutson	984	21.1	−0.4
Majority		1,623	34.8	
Turnout		4,659	37.4	
Conservative hold		Swing	▲9.4	

Southminster
Party	Candidate	Votes	%	±%
Conservative	David Fisher *	2,418	57.4	+7.2
SLD	Peter Barker	1,144	27.2	−6.2
Labour	Gary Prior	650	15.4	−1.0
Majority		1,274	30.2	
Turnout		4,212	29.0	
Conservative hold		Swing	▲6.7	

Tollesbury
Party	Candidate	Votes	%	±%
Conservative	Elizabeth Dines	2,842	57.0	+13.8
SLD	Merilyn Fraser	1,420	28.5	−16.4
Labour	William Dobson	723	14.5	+2.6
Majority		1,422	28.5	
Turnout		4,985	36.4	
Conservative gain from SLD		Swing	▲15.1	

=== Rochford ===
Rochford District Summary
Party	Seats	+/-	Votes	%	+/-
Conservative	2	Steady	9,080	43.4	+0.9
SLD	2	Steady	6,578	31.5	+4.8
Labour	1	Steady	6,578	21.6	–5.9
Independent	0	Steady	728	3.5	N/A
Total	5	Steady	20,904	35.3	–1.3

Division results

Rayleigh North
Party	Candidate	Votes	%	±%
SLD	Richard Boyd *	2,577	62.7	+5.6
Conservative	Pamela Hawke	1,307	31.8	−0.7
Labour	Loraine Rossati	229	5.6	−4.8
Majority		1,270	30.9	
Turnout		4,113	37.3	
SLD hold		Swing	▲3.2	

Rayleigh South
Party	Candidate	Votes	%	±%
SLD	James Gordon *	1,954	41.0	+4.1
Conservative	John Gibson	1,695	35.5	+7.6
Independent	Stanley Silva	728	15.3	−0.1
Labour	Peter Ballard	391	8.2	−11.6
Majority		259	5.4	
Turnout		4,768	39.8	
SLD hold		Swing	▼1.8	

Rochford North
Party	Candidate	Votes	%	±%
Conservative	Terry Fawell	1,704	46.0	+3.2
SLD	Bernard Crick	1,524	41.1	+3.4
Labour	Jeremiah Keohane	479	12.9	−6.5
Majority		180	4.9	
Turnout		3,707	29.4	
Conservative hold		Swing	▼0.1	

Rochford South
Party	Candidate	Votes	%	±%
Labour	David Flack	2,204	50.8	+0.8
Conservative	John Sheaf	2,136	49.2	−0.8
Majority		68	1.6	
Turnout		4,340	40.3	
Labour hold		Swing	▲0.8	

Rochford West
Party	Candidate	Votes	%	±%
Conservative	Anthony Stockley	2,238	56.3	−5.1
Labour	Christopher Morgan	1,215	30.6	−8.0
SLD	Clive Wren	523	13.2	N/A
Majority		1,023	25.7	
Turnout		3,976	30.9	
Conservative hold		Swing	▲1.5	

=== Southend ===
Southend District Summary
Party	Seats	+/-	Votes	%	+/-
Conservative	5	▲2	19,867	45.3	+6.2
SLD	5	▼2	14,318	32.6	–9.0
Labour	1	Steady	8,312	19.0	+1.1
SDP	0	Steady	1,362	3.1	N/A
Total	11	Steady	43,859	36.2	–1.8

Division results

Belfairs & Blenheim
Party	Candidate	Votes	%	±%
SLD	Albert Smulian *	1,996	49.8	−3.5
Conservative	Jeanette Rowswell	1,617	40.4	+4.4
Labour	Barry Thurston	394	9.8	±0.0
Majority		379	9.5	
Turnout		4,007	39.3	
SLD hold		Swing	▼4.0	

Chalkwell
Party	Candidate	Votes	%	±%
Conservative	Bertam Trevelyan	1,909	46.9	+1.8
SLD	Edna Bunclark	1,837	45.1	−2.8
Labour	Joyce Mapp	325	8.0	+1.0
Majority		72	1.8	
Turnout		4,071	38.3	
Conservative gain from SLD		Swing	▲2.3	

Eastwood
Party	Candidate	Votes	%	±%
SLD	Nora Goodman *	1,996	46.4	−6.1
Conservative	Gwendoline Horrigan	1,991	46.3	+6.7
Labour	Trevor Pyne	314	7.3	−0.6
Majority		5	0.1	
Turnout		4,301	39.8	
SLD hold		Swing	▼6.4	

Leigh
Party	Candidate	Votes	%	±%
SLD	Joyce Robinson *	2,553	49.4	−1.1
Conservative	Henry Stennett	2,289	44.3	+3.6
Labour	Lily Davidson	325	6.3	−0.6
Majority		264	5.1	
Turnout		5,167	48.3	
SLD hold		Swing	▼2.4	

Milton
Party	Candidate	Votes	%	±%
Conservative	Elizabeth Sullivan	1,682	40.3	+11.3
SDP	Colin George *	1,362	32.6	N/A
Labour	Kevin Lee	1,129	27.1	−0.7
Majority		320	7.7	
Turnout		4,173	37.4	
Conservative gain from SDP		Swing	▼10.7	

Prittlewell
Party	Candidate	Votes	%	±%
SLD	Nigel Baker	2,041	50.4	−9.1
Conservative	Estrellita Stanley	1,382	34.1	+7.6
Labour	Denis Garne	628	15.5	+1.5
Majority		659	16.3	
Turnout		4,051	34.5	
SLD hold		Swing	▼8.4	

Shoebury
Party	Candidate	Votes	%	±%
Conservative	David Cotgrove *	2,400	65.0	+16.1
Labour	Nigel Boorman	900	24.4	−2.7
SLD	Granville Stride	394	10.7	−5.2
Majority		1,500	40.6	
Turnout		3,694	29.1	
Conservative hold		Swing	▲9.4	

Southchurch
Party	Candidate	Votes	%	±%
Conservative	Brian Kelly *	1,948	56.5	+10.4
Labour	Robert Brown	1,025	29.7	+8.5
SLD	Alistair Miller	473	13.7	−19.0
Majority		923	26.8	
Turnout		3,446	32.3	
Conservative hold		Swing	▲1.0	

Thorpe
Party	Candidate	Votes	%	±%
Conservative	Kay Twitchen	2,280	65.8	+7.6
Labour	Kevin Ryan	592	17.1	−1.2
SLD	Robin Moore	592	17.1	−4.4
Majority		1,688	48.7	
Turnout		3,464	32.1	
Conservative hold		Swing	▲4.4	

Victoria
Party	Candidate	Votes	%	±%
Labour	Ronald Kennedy	2,112	57.6	+6.9
Conservative	Richard Higgs	1,194	32.6	+5.2
SLD	Robert McMullan	359	9.8	−12.0
Majority		918	25.0	
Turnout		3,665	34.8	
Labour hold		Swing	▲1.7	

Westborough
Party	Candidate	Votes	%	±%
SLD	Mary Lubel *	2,077	54.4	+7.4
Conservative	Richard Brown	1,175	30.8	−4.9
Labour	Keith Stone	568	14.9	−2.4
Majority		902	23.6	
Turnout		3,820	34.4	
SLD hold		Swing	▲6.2	

=== Tendring ===
Tendring District Summary
Party	Seats	+/-	Votes	%	+/-
Conservative	4	Steady	15,925	40.4	–1.1
Labour	2	Steady	11,961	30.3	+2.6
SLD	2	Steady	11,329	28.7	–1.7
Independent	0	Steady	226	0.6	+0.2
Total	8	Steady	39,411	39.3	–0.4

Division results

Brightlingsea
Party	Candidate	Votes	%	±%
SLD	Thomas Dale *	1,969	39.3	−10.4
Conservative	Ronald Marshall	1,869	37.3	+1.3
Labour	Cornelius Olivier	1,175	23.4	+9.1
Majority		100	2.0	
Turnout		5,013	42.2	
SLD hold		Swing	▼5.9	

Clacton East
Party	Candidate	Votes	%	±%
Conservative	John Story *	2,206	44.0	−7.0
SLD	Jean Duke	2,126	42.4	+9.9
Labour	Irene Jefferson	679	13.6	−3.0
Majority		80	1.6	
Turnout		5,011	40.0	
Conservative hold		Swing	▼8.5	

Clacton North
Party	Candidate	Votes	%	±%
SLD	Pauline Bevan	3,553	62.9	+7.4
Conservative	Martin Amos	1,322	23.4	−3.7
Labour	Geoffrey Aldous	772	13.7	−3.7
Majority		2,231	39.5	
Turnout		5,647	41.1	
SLD hold		Swing	▲5.6	

Clacton West
Party	Candidate	Votes	%	±%
Labour	Roy Smith *	2,738	57.7	+11.0
Conservative	Jill Winer	1,549	32.7	−0.4
SLD	Peter Miller	455	9.6	−9.6
Majority		1,189	25.1	
Turnout		4,742	35.6	
Labour hold		Swing	▲5.7	

Frinton & Walton
Party	Candidate	Votes	%	±%
Conservative	David Rex *	3,655	65.0	+6.9
Labour	Peter Lawes	1,185	21.1	+8.1
SLD	Robert Hamilton	779	13.9	−15.0
Majority		2,470	44.0	
Turnout		5,619	38.5	
Conservative hold		Swing	▼0.6	

Harwich
Party	Candidate	Votes	%	±%
Labour	Ralph Knight *	2,786	57.2	−1.9
Conservative	Frederick Lucas	1,347	27.6	−13.3
SLD	Michael Sears	739	15.2	N/A
Majority		1,439	29.5	
Turnout		4,872	41.1	
Labour hold		Swing	▲5.7	

Tendring Rural East
Party	Candidate	Votes	%	±%
Conservative	Charles Lumber *	1,875	51.5	+9.7
Labour	Kenneth Rose	1,207	33.1	+0.7
SLD	Alan Wallis	562	15.4	−10.4
Majority		668	18.3	
Turnout		3,644	34.0	
Conservative hold		Swing	▲4.5	

Tendring Rural West
Party	Candidate	Votes	%	±%
Conservative	Douglas Pallett *	2,102	43.0	−0.4
Labour	Lionel Randall	1,419	29.0	+4.4
SLD	Rosemary Smith	1,146	23.4	−5.9
Independent	Peter Bates	226	4.6	N/A
Majority		683	14.0	
Turnout		4,893	41.7	
Conservative hold		Swing	▼2.4	

=== Thurrock ===
Thurrock District Summary
Party	Seats	+/-	Votes	%	+/-
Labour	7	▼1	15,762	54.9	–11.9
Conservative	1	▲1	10,406	36.2	+3.3
SLD	0	Steady	1,507	5.2	N/A
Ind. Labour Party	0	Steady	1,045	3.6	N/A
Total	8	Steady	28,720	30.3	+3.6

Division results

Chadwell
Party	Candidate	Votes	%	±%
Labour	Gerard Rice	2,589	70.4	−0.8
Conservative	Paul Ciechomski	897	24.4	−4.4
SLD	Joan Overy	191	5.2	N/A
Majority		1,692	46.0	
Turnout		3,677	30.6	
Labour hold		Swing	▲1.8	

Corringham
Party	Candidate	Votes	%	±%
Labour	George Miles	1,435	47.9	−18.2
Conservative	Robert Hunter	1,271	42.5	+8.6
SLD	Sidney Senior	288	9.6	N/A
Majority		164	5.5	
Turnout		2,994	28.0	
Labour hold		Swing	▼13.4	

Grays Thurrock
Party	Candidate	Votes	%	±%
Labour	Beverly Barton *	2,251	49.2	−6.0
Conservative	Douglas Sutton	2,012	43.9	−0.9
SLD	Tony Scott	315	6.9	N/A
Majority		239	5.2	
Turnout		4,578	33.8	
Labour hold		Swing	▼2.6	

Orsett & Stifford
Party	Candidate	Votes	%	±%
Conservative	Peter Revell	2,513	52.4	+9.0
Labour	John Pollard *	1,987	41.4	−15.2
SLD	Alan Banton	300	6.3	N/A
Majority		526	11.0	
Turnout		4,800	43.4	
Conservative gain from Labour		Swing	▲12.1	

South Ockendon
Party	Candidate	Votes	%	±%
Labour	Margaret Jones	2,188	72.3	−9.0
Conservative	Susan Dalton	838	27.7	+9.0
Majority		1,350	44.6	
Turnout		3,026	28.2	
Labour hold		Swing	▼9.0	

Stanford-le-Hope
Party	Candidate	Votes	%	±%
Labour	Julian Norris *	1,869	54.8	−9.1
Conservative	William Lea	1,278	37.5	+1.4
SLD	Michael Birch	264	7.7	N/A
Majority		591	17.3	
Turnout		3,411	26.8	
Labour hold		Swing	▼5.3	

Tilbury
Party	Candidate	Votes	%	±%
Labour	Patrick Bolger *	1,892	75.2	−6.9
Conservative	Marie Bamford-Burst	475	18.9	+3.9
SLD	Vixien Howard	149	5.9	N/A
Majority		1,417	56.3	
Turnout		2,516	21.2	
Labour hold		Swing	▼5.4	

West Thurrock & Aveley
Party	Candidate	Votes	%	±%
Labour	Reginald Lee	1,551	41.7	−29.3
Conservative	Henry Cook	1,122	30.2	+1.2
Ind. Labour Party	Edward Vellacott	1,045	28.1	N/A
Majority		429	11.5	
Turnout		3,718	30.8	
Labour hold		Swing	▼15.3	

=== Uttlesford ===
Uttlesford District Summary
Party	Seats	+/-	Votes	%	+/-
Conservative	4	Steady	9,876	48.8	+0.6
SLD	0	Steady	6,078	30.1	–0.7
Labour	0	Steady	3,939	19.5	–0.9
Green	0	Steady	332	1.6	N/A
Total	4	Steady	20,225	40.5	–1.9

Division results

Dunmow
Party	Candidate	Votes	%	±%
Conservative	Michael Stephen *	2,686	62.1	+9.2
SLD	Nicholas Patterson	872	20.2	−11.8
Labour	Jennifer Oliveira	767	17.7	+5.2
Majority		1,814	41.9	
Turnout		4,325	37.4	
Conservative hold		Swing	▲10.5	

Saffron Walden
Party	Candidate	Votes	%	±%
Conservative	Stephen Neville *	2,373	37.3	−4.3
Labour	Russell Green	1,958	30.8	−3.3
SLD	Donald Benson	1,699	26.7	+2.3
Green	Kevin Saunders	332	5.2	N/A
Majority		415	6.5	
Turnout		6,362	43.3	
Conservative hold		Swing	▼0.5	

Stansted
Party	Candidate	Votes	%	±%
Conservative	Philip Duly	2,494	48.4	−0.8
SLD	Raymond Clifford	2,140	41.5	+5.7
Labour	Robin Shaw	520	10.1	−2.5
Majority		354	6.9	
Turnout		5,154	41.5	
Conservative hold		Swing	▼3.3	

Thaxted
Party	Candidate	Votes	%	±%
Conservative	John Whitehead	2,423	54.0	+1.8
SLD	John Gibb	1,367	30.5	−3.1
Labour	Katherine Donovan	694	15.5	+1.3
Majority		1,056	23.6	
Turnout		4,484	39.6	
Conservative hold		Swing	▲2.5	

== By-elections ==
=== Old Heath ===
Old Heath: May 1990
Party	Candidate	Votes	%	±%
Labour	Christopher Pearson	2,384	40.1	+4.2
Liberal Democrats	Vincent Edkins	2,103	35.4	–0.3
Conservative	Edward Winney	1,039	17.5	–1.9
SDP	John Parrick	416	7.0	N/A
Majority		281	4.7	
Turnout		5,942	48.1	
Registered electors		12,350		
Labour hold		Swing	▲2.3	

=== Brentwood Central ===
Brentwood Central: June 1990
Party	Candidate	Votes	%	±%
Liberal Democrats	Edgar Davis	2,210	56.0	+21.6
Conservative	John Hutton	1,339	33.9	–14.6
Labour	Francis Keohane	249	6.3	–4.2
Green	Philip Ray	89	2.3	–4.3
SDP	Samuel Ormsby	32	0.8	N/A
Independent	James Holdsworth	28	0.7	N/A
Majority		871	22.1	
Turnout		3,947	40.1	
Registered electors		9,853		
Liberal Democrats gain from Conservative		Swing	▲18.1	

=== Dunmow ===
Dunmow: May 1991
Party	Candidate	Votes	%	±%
Conservative	David Westcott	2,937	56.4	–5.7
Liberal Democrats	John Gibb	1,451	27.9	+7.7
Labour	David Cole	817	15.7	–2.0
Majority		1,486	28.5	
Turnout		5,205	45.1	
Registered electors		11,532		
Conservative hold		Swing	▼6.7	

=== Basildon Laindon ===
Basildon Laindon: September 1991
Party	Candidate	Votes	%	±%
Conservative	David Walsh	1,780	48.4	+13.1
Labour	Harold Bruce	1,360	37.0	–17.6
Liberal Democrats	Simon Wilson	538	538	+4.4
Majority		420	11.4	
Turnout		3,678	33.2	
Registered electors		11,063		
Conservative gain from Labour		Swing	▲15.4	

=== Brentwood Hutton ===
Brentwood Hutton: September 1992
Party	Candidate	Votes	%	±%
Conservative	Alun Thomas	1,872	57.9	–4.9
Liberal Democrats	Katharine Spanton	1,191	36.8	+18.6
Labour	Edward O'Brien	172	5.3	–13.7
Majority		681	21.1	
Turnout		3,235	26.8	
Registered electors		12,183		
Conservative hold		Swing	▼11.8	
