= Needle in a haystack =

Needle in a haystack may refer to:

- "Needle in a Haystack" (House), an episode of the TV series House
- "Needle in a Haystack", an episode of the TV series Mythbusters
- "Needle in a Haystack", a 1964 pop song record by the Velvelettes
- Burned Haystack Dating Method, an online dating technique designed for women
- Terms in a two-way string-matching algorithm

== See also ==
- Needle in the Haystack, a 1953 Brazilian comedy film
