= 1993 Essex County Council election =

1993 UK local government election

← 1989	6 May 1993	1997 →

All 98 seats to Essex County Council 50 seats needed for a majority
- Registered: 1,190,322
- Turnout: 36.0%

	First party	Second party
Party	Labour	Conservative
Last election	26 seats, 28.8%	57 seats, 44.5%
Seats before	24	56
Seats won	33	32
Seat change	▲7	▼25
Popular vote	127,934	147,062
Percentage	30.7%	35.3%
Swing	▲1.9%	▼8.7%
	Third party	Fourth party
Party	Liberal Democrats	Independent
Last election	14 seats, 23.3%	0 seats, 0.3%
Seats before	15	3
Seats won	32	1
Seat change	▲18	▲1
Popular vote	132,631	3,673
Percentage	31.9%	0.8%
Swing	▲8.2%	▲0.5%
- Results of the 1993 Essex County Council election.
Council control before election
Conservative
Council control after election
No overall control

The 1993 Essex County Council election took place on 6 May 1993 to elect members of Essex County Council in Essex, England. It was held on the same day as other local elections.

98 councillors were elected from various electoral divisions, which returned either one or two county councillors each by first-past-the-post voting for a four-year term of office.

== Previous composition ==
=== 1989 election ===
Party	Seats
Conservative	57
Labour	26
Liberal Democrats	14
Loughton Residents	1
Total	79

=== Composition of council seats before election ===
Party	Seats
Conservative	56
Labour	24
Liberal Democrats	15
Independent	3
Loughton Residents	1
Total	79

== Summary ==
=== Election result ===
1993 Essex County Council election
Party	Candidates	Seats	Gains	Losses	Net gain/loss	Seats %	Votes %	Votes	+/−
Labour	98	33	9	2	▲7	33.7	30.7	134,312	+1.7
Conservative	98	32	0	25	▼25	32.7	35.3	154,972	–8.5
Liberal Democrats	92	32	18	0	▲18	32.7	31.9	135,899	+8.2
Independent	3	1	1	0	▲1	1.0	0.8	3,673	+0.5
Green	19	0	0	0	Steady	0.0	1.0	4,025	–0.4
Liberal	5	0	0	0	Steady	0.0	0.2	1,043	+0.1

The Loughton Residents Association, who previously held one seat, did not stand candidates at this election.

== Division results by local authority ==
=== Basildon ===
Basildon District Summary
Party	Seats	+/-	Votes	%	+/-
Labour	5	Steady	19,038	41.2	+4.4
Conservative	4	Steady	17,164	37.2	–3.7
Liberal Democrats	1	Steady	9,738	21.1	–0.5
Independent	0	Steady	252	0.5	+0.1
Total	10	Steady	46,192	37.8	+1.6

Division results

Basildon Crouch
Party	Candidate	Votes	%	±%
Liberal Democrats	Geoffrey Williams	1,900	44.1	−5.0
Conservative	Anthony Smith	1,699	39.4	+0.6
Labour	Colin Wilson	709	16.5	+4.5
Majority		201	4.7	
Turnout		4,308	40.8	
Liberal Democrats hold		Swing	▼2.8	

Basildon Fryerns
Party	Candidate	Votes	%	±%
Labour	Williams Archibald *	2,631	68.0	+9.3
Conservative	Amanda Almond	870	22.5	+2.1
Liberal Democrats	David Birch	369	9.5	−11.4
Majority		1,761	45.5	
Turnout		3,870	39.1	
Labour hold		Swing	▲3.6	

Basildon Gloucester Park
Party	Candidate	Votes	%	±%
Labour	Madeline Costello *	3,169	65.3	−0.5
Conservative	Anthony Ball	1,246	25.7	+0.7
Liberal Democrats	John Smith	437	9.0	−0.2
Majority		1,923	39.6	
Turnout		4,852	41.9	
Labour hold		Swing	▼0.6	

Basildon Laindon
Party	Candidate	Votes	%	±%
Labour	Rachel Liebeschuetz	2,261	57.6	+3.0
Conservative	David Walsh *	1,232	31.4	−3.9
Liberal Democrats	Michael Martin	432	11.0	+0.8
Majority		1,029	26.2	
Turnout		3,925	36.1	
Labour hold		Swing	▲3.5	

Basildon Pitsea
Party	Candidate	Votes	%	±%
Labour	Angela Smith *	3,385	57.5	+0.6
Conservative	John Newry	1,947	33.1	−1.8
Liberal Democrats	Mark Hersom	550	9.4	+1.2
Majority		1,438	24.4	
Turnout		5,882	34.4	
Labour hold		Swing	▲1.2	

Basildon Vange
Party	Candidate	Votes	%	±%
Labour	Anthony Wright *	2,876	61.8	−1.7
Conservative	Sandra Elliott	1,304	28.0	+0.1
Liberal Democrats	Betty Wakeham	477	10.2	+1.6
Majority		1,572	33.8	
Turnout		4,657	37.0	
Labour hold		Swing	▼0.8	

Basildon Westley Heights
Party	Candidate	Votes	%	±%
Conservative	Brinley Jones *	2,071	40.7	−5.5
Labour	Robert Sears	1,924	37.8	+4.2
Liberal Democrats	Maureen Larkin	1,091	21.5	+3.6
Majority		147	2.9	
Turnout		5,086	43.7	
Conservative hold		Swing	▼4.9	

Billericay North
Party	Candidate	Votes	%	±%
Conservative	Lilian Greenfield *	2,641	61.8	−9.6
Liberal Democrats	Matthew Barr	1,164	27.2	+11.4
Labour	Margaret Viney	471	11.0	+2.4
Majority		1,477	34.5	−20.9
Turnout		4,276	33.4	−3.4
Conservative hold		Swing		

Billericay South
Party	Candidate	Votes	%	±%
Conservative	Susan Kay	1,921	40.8	−13.6
Liberal Democrats	Geoffrey Taylor	1,802	38.3	+9.7
Labour	Ronald Bessell	765	16.2	±0.0
Independent	George Dighton *	252	5.4	−49.0
Majority		119	2.5	−22.3
Turnout		4,710	38.5	+1.3
Conservative hold		Swing		

Note: George Dighton was elected as a Conservative in 1989, but here attempted to defend his seat as an Independent

Wickford division
Party	Candidate	Votes	%	±%
Conservative	Iris Pummell *	2,233	48.6	+4.2
Liberal Democrats	Kay Battson	1,516	33.0	−9.3
Labour	Christopher Wilson	847	18.4	+5.1
Majority		717	15.6	+13.5
Turnout		4,596	37.3	−3.1
Conservative hold		Swing		

=== Braintree ===
Briantree District Summary
Party	Seats	+/-	Votes	%	+/-
Labour	4	▲2	14,450	40.2	+6.1
Conservative	2	▼2	12,651	35.2	–8.7
Liberal Democrats	1	Steady	7,934	22.1	+1.7
Green	0	Steady	924	2.6	+1.0
Total	7	Steady	35,959	39.0	–0.9

Division results

Bocking
Party	Candidate	Votes	%	±%
Labour	Frederick Card	2,397	44.3	−8.9
Conservative	John Finbow	1,882	34.8	−4.6
Liberal Democrats	Pamela Fahy	994	18.4	+11.0
Green	Kevin Peterson	133	2.5	N/A
Majority		515	9.5	
Turnout		5,406	44.0	
Labour hold		Swing	▼2.2	

Braintree East
Party	Candidate	Votes	%	±%
Labour	Elwyn Bishop	2,849	46.6	+13.8
Conservative	Robert Dixon-Smith *	2,228	36.4	−16.1
Liberal Democrats	Billie Daniels	859	14.0	−0.6
Green	Philip Hughes	184	3.0	N/A
Majority		621	10.1	
Turnout		6,120	42.9	
Labour gain from Conservative		Swing	▲15.0	

Braintree West
Party	Candidate	Votes	%	±%
Liberal Democrats	Douglas Rice *	2,548	45.2	−0.1
Conservative	Graham Hutton	1,559	27.7	−12.2
Labour	Jeremy White	1,375	24.4	+9.7
Green	Marran Bates	156	2.8	N/A
Majority		989	17.5	
Turnout		5,638	40.4	
Liberal Democrats hold		Swing	▲6.1	

Halstead
Party	Candidate	Votes	%	±%
Conservative	Joseph Pike *	1,936	38.7	−5.3
Labour	John Kotz	1,917	38.3	+5.4
Liberal Democrats	David Clayton	1,150	23.0	−0.1
Majority		19	0.4	
Turnout		5,003	37.6	
Conservative hold		Swing	▼5.4	

Hedingham
Party	Candidate	Votes	%	±%
Conservative	Geoffrey Waterer *	2,169	46.2	−8.3
Labour	Noel Owen	1,324	28.2	+2.6
Liberal Democrats	Trevor Ellis	1,199	25.6	+5.8
Majority		845	18.0	
Turnout		4,692	38.6	
Conservative hold		Swing	▼5.5	

Witham Northern
Party	Candidate	Votes	%	±%
Labour	Joan Lyon *	2,726	57.5	+10.7
Conservative	Roger Wacey	1,179	24.9	−8.2
Liberal Democrats	Gail Sanders	558	11.8	+3.4
Green	James Abbott	278	5.9	−5.9
Majority		1,547	32.6	
Turnout		4,741	34.5	
Labour hold		Swing	▲9.5	

Witham Southern
Party	Candidate	Votes	%	±%
Labour	John Gyford	1,862	42.7	+6.7
Conservative	Judith Bird	1,698	39.0	−5.8
Liberal Democrats	Alfred Slowman	626	14.4	−4.8
Green	Susan Ransome	173	4.0	N/A
Majority		164	3.8	
Turnout		4,359	35.0	
Labour gain from Conservative		Swing	▲6.3	

=== Brentwood ===
Brentwood District Summary
Party	Seats	+/-	Votes	%	+/-
Liberal Democrats	5	▲5	11,469	51.6	+22.9
Conservative	0	▼4	7,975	35.9	–14.8
Labour	0	Steady	2,158	9.7	–8.6
Green	0	Steady	635	2.9	+0.6
Total	5	Steady	22,237	40.4	±0.0

Division results

Brentwood Central
Party	Candidate	Votes	%	±%
Liberal Democrats	Edgar Davis *	2,349	58.9	+24.5
Conservative	Susan Sepkes	1,202	30.2	−18.3
Labour	Clara Dyer	298	7.5	−3.0
Green	Frank Seckleman	137	3.4	−3.2
Majority		1,147	28.7	
Turnout		3,986	42.2	
Liberal Democrats gain from Conservative		Swing	▲21.4	

Brentwood Hutton
Party	Candidate	Votes	%	±%
Liberal Democrats	Keith White	1,871	43.9	+25.7
Conservative	Alun Thomas *	1,859	43.6	−19.2
Labour	Malcolm Burgess	424	10.0	−9.0
Green	Beryl Lankester	107	2.5	N/A
Majority		12	0.3	
Turnout		4,261	34.9	
Liberal Democrats gain from Conservative		Swing	▲22.5	

Brentwood North
Party	Candidate	Votes	%	±%
Liberal Democrats	Richard Smart	1,885	52.7	+18.1
Conservative	Leonard Jago *	1,369	38.2	−15.6
Labour	Jeremiah Keohane	254	7.1	−4.4
Green	Roger Lankester	72	2.0	N/A
Majority		516	14.4	
Turnout		3,580	38.4	
Liberal Democrats gain from Conservative		Swing	▲16.9	

Brentwood Rural
Party	Candidate	Votes	%	±%
Liberal Democrats	Derek Hardy *	3,180	58.1	+5.0
Conservative	Christopher House	1,783	32.6	−3.8
Labour	Anthony Wilson	344	6.3	+0.4
Green	Carolyn Bartley	164	3.0	−1.6
Majority		1,397	25.5	
Turnout		5,471	44.1	
Liberal Democrats hold		Swing	▲4.4	

Brentwood South
Party	Candidate	Votes	%	±%
Liberal Democrats	Lionel Lee	2,184	44.2	N/A
Conservative	Janet Hayward *	1,762	35.7	−21.1
Labour	Lily Southgate	838	17.0	−26.3
Green	Jean Walsh	155	3.1	N/A
Majority		422	8.5	
Turnout		4,939	42.5	
Liberal Democrats gain from Conservative		Swing	▲32.7	

=== Castle Point ===
Castle Point District Summary
Party	Seats	+/-	Votes	%	+/-
Labour	3	▲3	8,680	34.2	+4.8
Conservative	2	▼4	8,448	33.3	–26.3
Liberal Democrats	1	▲1	8,226	32.4	+23.6
Total	6	Steady	25,354	37.7	+1.2

Division results

Benfleet
Party	Candidate	Votes	%	±%
Conservative	Jillian Reeves *	1,248	35.9	−25.3
Liberal Democrats	Michael Minson	1,209	34.8	+22.1
Labour	Brian Wilson	1,017	29.3	+3.1
Majority		39	1.1	
Turnout		3,474	35.7	
Conservative hold		Swing	▼23.7	

Canvey Island East
Party	Candidate	Votes	%	±%
Labour	Melvyn Farrant	2,075	40.7	+8.8
Conservative	Harold King *	1,713	33.6	−24.0
Liberal Democrats	John Pharro	1,306	25.6	N/A
Majority		362	7.1	
Turnout		5,094	35.5	
Labour gain from Conservative		Swing	▲16.4	

Canvey Island West
Party	Candidate	Votes	%	±%
Conservative	Raymond Howard *	2,142	44.0	−13.2
Labour	William Deal	1,890	38.8	+4.1
Liberal Democrats	Barry Newman	840	17.2	+9.1
Majority		252	5.2	
Turnout		4,872	36.2	
Conservative hold		Swing	▼8.7	

Great Tarpots
Party	Candidate	Votes	%	±%
Labour	Christine Butler	1,851	46.1	+12.8
Conservative	Garth Hydes	1,125	28.0	−26.1
Liberal Democrats	Tracy Birch	1,043	26.0	+13.4
Majority		726	18.1	
Turnout		4,019	36.7	
Labour gain from Conservative		Swing	▲19.5	

Hadleigh
Party	Candidate	Votes	%	±%
Liberal Democrats	Michael Baker	2,524	60.6	+48.9
Conservative	Ronald Williams *	1,186	28.5	−38.0
Labour	Joseph Cooke	457	11.0	−10.8
Majority		1,338	32.1	
Turnout		4,167	46.6	
Liberal Democrats gain from Conservative		Swing	▲43.5	

Thundersley
Party	Candidate	Votes	%	±%
Labour	Guy Shearwood	1,390	37.3	+20.2
Liberal Democrats	Eric Fenwick	1,304	35.0	+17.9
Conservative	William Dick	1,034	27.7	−34.9
Majority		86	2.3	
Turnout		3,728	38.4	
Labour gain from Conservative		Swing	▲1.2	

=== Chelmsford ===
Chelmsford District Summary
Party	Seats	+/-	Votes	%	+/-
Liberal Democrats	5	▲4	20,464	43.2	+11.6
Conservative	3	▼5	17,625	37.2	–8.3
Labour	1	▲1	8,926	18.8	+3.4
Green	0	Steady	383	0.8	–6.3
Total	9	Steady	47,398	40.2	–0.7

Division results

Broomfield & Writtle
Party	Candidate	Votes	%	±%
Liberal Democrats	Phillip Evans	1,676	40.1	+26.6
Conservative	Michael Rose *	1,598	38.3	−17.5
Labour	Barry Grainger	790	18.9	−1.0
Green	Colin Jameson	111	2.7	−8.1
Majority		78	1.9	
Turnout		4,175	41.5	
Liberal Democrats gain from Conservative		Swing	▲22.1	

Chelmsford East
Party	Candidate	Votes	%	±%
Liberal Democrats	Mark Burton	2,677	49.5	+14.1
Conservative	David Kimberlin *	2,068	38.3	−8.2
Labour	John McCreevy	659	12.2	+1.6
Majority		609	11.3	
Turnout		5,404	45.4	
Liberal Democrats gain from Conservative		Swing	▲11.2	

Chelmsford North
Party	Candidate	Votes	%	±%
Liberal Democrats	Thomas Smith-Hughes	2,309	39.5	+8.7
Labour	Roy Chad	1,916	32.8	+2.8
Conservative	Kathleen Pauley *	1,623	27.8	−6.8
Majority		393	6.7	
Turnout		5,848	51.0	
Liberal Democrats gain from Conservative		Swing	▲3.0	

Chelmsford South
Party	Candidate	Votes	%	±%
Liberal Democrats	George Allen	2,890	56.8	+17.5
Conservative	Vernon Makin *	1,562	30.7	−9.3
Labour	Christopher Finlay	640	12.6	+1.2
Majority		1,328	26.1	
Turnout		5,092	44.4	
Liberal Democrats gain from Conservative		Swing	▲13.4	

Chelmsford West
Party	Candidate	Votes	%	±%
Labour	Neil Spurgeon	1,808	36.5	+5.1
Conservative	David Lee *	1,655	33.4	+2.0
Liberal Democrats	Lynne Foster	1,489	30.1	+3.6
Majority		153	3.1	
Turnout		4,952	50.1	
Labour gain from Conservative		Swing	▲1.6	

Great Baddow
Party	Candidate	Votes	%	±%
Liberal Democrats	Joan Beard	2,851	63.1	+15.3
Conservative	Edward Alliston	1,120	24.8	−13.6
Labour	Owen Ephraim	547	12.1	+3.6
Majority		1,731	38.3	
Turnout		4,518	43.1	
Liberal Democrats hold		Swing	▲14.5	

Springfield
Party	Candidate	Votes	%	±%
Conservative	Peter Martin *	2,723	41.3	−10.1
Liberal Democrats	William Lane	2,701	41.0	+9.8
Labour	William Horslen	896	13.6	+3.2
Green	Eleanor Burgess	272	4.1	−3.0
Majority		22	0.3	
Turnout		6,592	33.6	
Conservative hold		Swing	▼10.0	

Stock
Party	Candidate	Votes	%	±%
Conservative	Paul White *	2,285	48.8	−10.7
Liberal Democrats	Jeremy Clarke	1,483	31.7	+12.9
Labour	Ashley Final	911	19.5	+4.9
Majority		802	17.1	
Turnout		4,679	33.6	
Conservative hold		Swing	▲11.8	

Woodham Ferrers & Danbury
Party	Candidate	Votes	%	±%
Conservative	Eileen Mickelborough *	2,991	48.7	−0.9
Liberal Democrats	Maurice Staines	2,388	38.9	+3.1
Labour	Robert Davis	759	12.4	+4.7
Majority		603	9.8	
Turnout		6,138	32.1	
Conservative hold		Swing	▼2.0	

=== Colchester ===
Colchester District Summary
Party	Seats	+/-	Votes	%	+/-
Liberal Democrats	5	▲4	17,598	44.3	+19.7
Conservative	3	▼3	12,729	32.0	–12.1
Labour	1	▼1	8,874	22.3	–3.2
Green	0	Steady	546	1.4	+0.5
Total	9	Steady	39,747	34.9	–1.7

Division results

Constable division
Party	Candidate	Votes	%	±%
Conservative	Anthony Clover *	2,065	48.2	−15.0
Liberal Democrats	Andrew Phillips	1,705	39.8	+15.9
Labour	Neville Missing	516	12.0	−0.9
Majority		360	8.4	
Turnout			39.8	
Conservative hold		Swing		

Drury division
Party	Candidate	Votes	%	±%
Liberal Democrats	Robert Yates *	3,172	54.5	+15.4
Conservative	Derek Lamberth	2,106	36.1	−12.1
Labour	Kim Naish	553	9.5	−3.3
Majority		1,066	18.3	
Turnout			44.9	
Liberal Democrats gain from Conservative		Swing		

Maypole division
Party	Candidate	Votes	%	±%
Liberal Democrats	Patricia Pascoe *	1,984	56.3	+15.0
Labour	Frank Wilkin	961	27.3	−7.9
Conservative	Michael Hope	579	16.4	−7.1
Majority		1,023	29.0	
Turnout			27.2	
Liberal Democrats hold		Swing		

Mersea and Stanway division
Party	Candidate	Votes	%	±%
Conservative	Christopher Manning-Press	2,290	44.2	−17.0
Liberal Democrats	Elizabeth Lennox	2,094	40.4	+15.8
Labour	Julie Young	653	12.6	−1.6
Green	Walter Schwarz	147	2.8	New
Majority		196	3.8	
Turnout			34.9	
Conservative hold		Swing		

Old Heath division
Party	Candidate	Votes	%	±%
Liberal Democrats	Margaret Fisher	2,415	51.1	+15.4
Labour	Christopher Pearson *	1,617	34.2	−1.7
Conservative	Sally Cockell	568	12.0	−7.4
Green	Karen Smallwood	122	2.6	−5.3
Majority		798	16.9	
Turnout			38.1	
Liberal Democrats gain from Labour		Swing		

No Independent candidate as previous (-1.2).

Park division
Party	Candidate	Votes	%	±%
Liberal Democrats	Kenneth Jones	2,009	46.8	+22.9
Conservative	Jeremy Lucas *	1,475	34.3	−10.5
Labour	Roger Turp	811	18.9	−5.9
Majority		534	12.4	
Turnout			36.8	
Liberal Democrats gain from Conservative		Swing		

No Liberal candidate as previous (-6.5).

Parsons Heath division
Party	Candidate	Votes	%	±%
Liberal Democrats	Edward Crunden	2,783	53.2	New
Labour	Keith Hindle	1,282	24.5	−1.7
Conservative	Roger Lord *	1,167	22.3	−15.5
Majority		1,501	28.7	
Turnout			36.9	
Liberal Democrats gain from Conservative		Swing		

No SDP candidate as previous (−36.0).

Tiptree division
Party	Candidate	Votes	%	±%
Conservative	Edmund Peel *	1,574	44.4	−16.4
Labour	Adrian Axtell	914	25.8	+3.4
Liberal Democrats	Andrew Seaman	893	25.2	+8.4
Green	Cheryl Gerrard	162	4.6	New
Majority		633	18.0	
Turnout			29.5	
Conservative hold		Swing		

Wivenhoe St Andrew division
Party	Candidate	Votes	%	±%
Labour	Brian Stapleton *	1,567	50.1	−3.8
Conservative	Christopher Thompson	905	28.9	−7.6
Liberal Democrats	Ingrid O'Mahoney	543	17.3	+7.7
Green	Joanne Vanevery	115	3.7	New
Majority		662	21.2	
Turnout			26.3	
Labour hold		Swing		

=== Epping Forest ===
Epping Forest District Summary
Party	Seats	+/-	Votes	%	+/-
Conservative	4	▼1	12,388	41.1	–6.7
Labour	3	▲1	9,292	30.8	+3.5
Liberal Democrats	1	▲1	8,226	27.3	+12.7
Independent	0	Steady	250	0.8	N/A
Total	8	Steady	30,156	32.8	+0.2

Division results

Buckhurst Hill
Party	Candidate	Votes	%	±%
Liberal Democrats	Stephen Robinson	2,721	59.8	+40.8
Conservative	Peter Ashton	1,165	25.6	−17.0
Labour	Joan Davis	416	9.1	−2.0
Independent	Janice Croke	250	5.5	N/A
Majority		1,556	34.2	
Turnout		4,552	41.2	
Liberal Democrats gain from Conservative		Swing	▲28.9	

Chigwell
Party	Candidate	Votes	%	±%
Conservative	Anthony Twynham	1,313	58.6	+0.2
Liberal Democrats	Peter Spencer	646	28.8	−1.0
Labour	Christopher Newbury	283	12.6	+5.7
Majority		667	29.8	
Turnout		2,242	23.2	
Conservative hold		Swing	▲0.6	

Epping
Party	Candidate	Votes	%	±%
Conservative	Dennis Ramshaw *	1,548	43.3	−2.8
Liberal Democrats	Allan Boydon	1,238	34.7	+2.7
Labour	Ian Standfast	786	22.0	+6.8
Majority		310	8.7	
Turnout		3,572	29.7	
Conservative hold		Swing	▼2.8	

Loughton St. Johns
Party	Candidate	Votes	%	±%
Labour	Frank Davis *	1,532	55.4	+8.7
Conservative	John Pledge	831	30.0	−6.7
Liberal Democrats	Lucille Wells	404	14.6	+6.8
Majority		701	25.3	
Turnout		2,767	28.1	
Labour hold		Swing	▲7.7	

Loughton St. Marys
Party	Candidate	Votes	%	±%
Labour	Charles Saggers	1,608	45.1	+11.9
Conservative	Vernon Davies	1,267	35.6	+3.0
Liberal Democrats	Nicholas Macy	687	19.3	N/A
Majority		341	9.6	
Turnout		3,562	34.1	
Labour gain from Loughton Residents		Swing	▲4.5	

North Weald & Nazeing
Party	Candidate	Votes	%	±%
Conservative	Ian Abbey *	1,915	60.5	−10.2
Labour	Elisabeth Young	637	20.1	+2.2
Liberal Democrats	Ian Myers	615	19.4	+8.0
Majority		1,278	40.4	
Turnout		3,167	29.7	
Conservative hold		Swing	▼6.2	

Ongar
Party	Candidate	Votes	%	±%
Conservative	Gerard McEwen *	2,163	41.2	−9.9
Liberal Democrats	Steven Partridge	1,915	36.5	+19.9
Labour	Patrick Haseldine	1,167	22.2	−10.0
Majority		248	4.7	
Turnout		5,245	39.2	
Conservative hold		Swing	▼14.9	

Waltham Abbey
Party	Candidate	Votes	%	±%
Labour	Cyril Hewins	2,863	56.7	+10.9
Conservative	Norma Green	2,186	43.3	−2.0
Majority		677	13.4	
Turnout		5,049	34.3	
Labour hold		Swing	▲6.5	

=== Harlow ===
Harlow District Summary
Party	Seats	+/-	Votes	%	+/-
Labour	5	▲1	11,582	51.9	–7.3
Conservative	0	▼1	6,944	31.1	+2.7
Liberal Democrats	0	Steady	3,782	17.0	+4.5
Total	5	Steady	22,308	39.5	+0.3

Division results

Great Parndon
Party	Candidate	Votes	%	±%
Labour	Mervyn Juliff	2,213	44.8	+1.9
Conservative	David Messer *	1,976	40.0	−7.7
Liberal Democrats	Derek Harris	749	15.2	+5.8
Majority		237	4.8	
Turnout		4,938	39.0	
Labour gain from Conservative		Swing	▲4.8	

Harlow & Mark Hall
Party	Candidate	Votes	%	±%
Labour	Paul Sztumpf	2,388	49.8	−13.1
Conservative	Edward Hudspeth	1,765	36.8	+6.2
Liberal Democrats	Douglas Collins	647	13.5	+6.9
Majority		623	13.0	
Turnout		4,800	45.6	
Labour hold		Swing	▼9.7	

Harlow Common
Party	Candidate	Votes	%	±%
Labour	Pauline Bruce	2,091	51.9	−3.1
Liberal Democrats	Lorna Spenceley	1,060	26.3	−0.6
Conservative	Vivien Thomas	880	21.8	+3.7
Majority		1,031	25.6	
Turnout		4,031	37.3	
Labour hold		Swing	▼1.3	

Little Parndon & Town Centre
Party	Candidate	Votes	%	±%
Labour	Edith Morris *	2,053	53.8	−11.6
Conservative	David Roberts	1,117	29.2	+5.8
Liberal Democrats	Stanley Ward	649	17.0	+5.8
Majority		936	24.5	
Turnout		3,819	36.2	
Labour hold		Swing	▼8.7	

Netteswellbury
Party	Candidate	Votes	%	±%
Labour	Sonia Anderson *	2,837	60.5	−11.9
Conservative	Philip Weales	1,206	25.6	+6.8
Liberal Democrats	Sheila Herbert	677	14.3	+5.1
Majority		1,631	34.6	
Turnout		4,720	39.7	
Labour hold		Swing	▼9.4	

=== Maldon ===
Maldon District Summary
Party	Seats	+/-	Votes	%	+/-
Conservative	3	Steady	6,289	47.6	–9.5
Labour	0	Steady	3,448	26.1	+9.1
Green	0	Steady	1,537	11.6	N/A
Liberal Democrats	0	Steady	1,416	10.7	–15.2
Independent	0	Steady	525	4.0	N/A
Total	3	Steady	13,215	32.5	–1.5

Division results

Maldon
Party	Candidate	Votes	%	±%
Conservative	Kathleen Nolan *	2,122	48.3	−8.6
Labour	Peter Roberts	1,345	30.6	+9.5
Independent	Coral Broyd	525	12.0	N/A
Green	Michael Cole	397	9.0	N/A
Majority		777	17.7	
Turnout		4,389	35.1	
Conservative hold		Swing	▼9.1	

Southminster
Party	Candidate	Votes	%	±%
Conservative	David Fisher *	1,965	47.2	−10.2
Labour	Eric Garwood	1,304	31.3	+15.9
Green	David Mason	894	21.5	N/A
Majority		661	15.9	
Turnout		4,163	28.6	
Conservative hold		Swing	▼13.1	

Tollesbury
Party	Candidate	Votes	%	±%
Conservative	Elizabeth Dines *	2,202	47.2	−9.8
Liberal Democrats	Joyce Woodham	1,416	30.4	+1.9
Labour	Eileen Garwood	799	17.1	+2.6
Green	Nelson Brunton	246	5.3	N/A
Majority		786	16.9	
Turnout		4,663	34.5	
Conservative hold		Swing	▼5.9	

=== Rochford ===
Rochford District Summary
Party	Seats	+/-	Votes	%	+/-
Liberal Democrats	3	▲1	9,762	46.3	+14.8
Conservative	1	▼1	6,873	32.6	–10.8
Labour	1	Steady	4,429	21.0	–0.6
Total	5	Steady	21,064	35.8	+0.5

Division results

Rayleigh North
Party	Candidate	Votes	%	±%
Liberal Democrats	Richard Boyd *	2,985	70.9	+8.2
Conservative	Rosemary Brown	928	22.0	−9.8
Labour	David Rossi	298	7.1	+1.5
Majority		2,057	48.8	
Turnout		4,211	38.0	
Liberal Democrats hold		Swing	▲9.0	

Rayleigh South
Party	Candidate	Votes	%	±%
Liberal Democrats	James Gordon	2,891	61.9	+20.9
Conservative	Peter Webster	1,338	28.6	−6.9
Labour	Stephen Andre	444	9.5	+1.3
Majority		1,553	33.2	
Turnout		4,673	39.6	
Liberal Democrats hold		Swing	▲13.9	

Rochford North
Party	Candidate	Votes	%	±%
Liberal Democrats	Paula Smith	2,337	55.0	+13.9
Conservative	Terry Fawell *	1,424	33.5	−12.5
Labour	Charles Stephenson	487	11.5	−1.4
Majority		913	21.5	
Turnout		4,248	33.6	
Liberal Democrats gain from Conservative		Swing	▲13.2	

Rochford South
Party	Candidate	Votes	%	±%
Labour	Graham Fox	1,918	48.0	−2.8
Conservative	Geoffrey Lee	1,483	37.1	−12.1
Liberal Democrats	Neil Hurrell	597	14.9	N/A
Majority		435	10.9	
Turnout		3,998	37.4	
Labour hold		Swing	▲4.7	

Rochford West
Party	Candidate	Votes	%	±%
Conservative	Elizabeth Hart	1,700	43.2	−13.1
Labour	David Flack *	1,282	32.6	+2.0
Liberal Democrats	Kenneth Saunders	952	24.2	+11.0
Majority		418	10.6	
Turnout		3,934	31.0	
Conservative hold		Swing	▼7.6	

=== Southend ===
Southend District Summary
Party	Seats	+/-	Votes	%	+/-
Conservative	5	Steady	16,076	39.2	–6.1
Liberal Democrats	5	Steady	14,958	36.5	+3.9
Labour	1	Steady	8,951	21.8	+2.8
Liberal	0	Steady	1,043	2.5	N/A
Total	11	Steady	41,028	33.3	–2.9

Division results

Belfairs & Blenheim
Party	Candidate	Votes	%	±%
Liberal Democrats	Albert Smulian *	2,250	52.0	+2.2
Conservative	Doris Muckley	1,609	37.2	−3.2
Labour	Jonathan Grindley	355	8.2	−1.6
Liberal	Vernon Wilkinson	116	2.7	N/A
Majority		641	14.8	
Turnout		4,330	43.0	
Liberal Democrats hold		Swing	▲2.7	

Chalkwell
Party	Candidate	Votes	%	±%
Conservative	Bertram Trevelyan *	1,602	47.0	+0.1
Liberal Democrats	Alan Crystall	1,365	40.0	−5.1
Labour	Joyce Mapp	444	13.0	+5.0
Majority		237	7.0	
Turnout		3,411	31.2	
Conservative hold		Swing	▲2.6	

Eastwood
Party	Candidate	Votes	%	±%
Liberal Democrats	Norah Goodman *	2,180	51.6	+5.2
Conservative	Veronica Taylor	1,557	36.8	−9.5
Labour	Marc Pether-Longman	435	10.3	+3.0
Liberal	Linda Farmer	55	1.3	N/A
Majority		623	14.7	
Turnout		4,227	39.7	
Liberal Democrats hold		Swing	▲7.4	

Leigh
Party	Candidate	Votes	%	±%
Liberal Democrats	Derek Pawson	2,595	53.4	+4.0
Conservative	Peter Longden	1,832	37.7	−6.6
Labour	Paul Circus	312	6.4	+0.1
Liberal	Keith Izard	122	2.5	N/A
Majority		763	15.7	
Turnout		4,861	45.6	
Liberal Democrats hold		Swing	▲5.3	

Milton
Party	Candidate	Votes	%	±%
Conservative	Elizabeth Sullivan *	1,438	43.8	+3.5
Labour	Kevin Lee	1,233	37.5	+10.4
Liberal Democrats	Simon Hall	614	18.7	N/A
Majority		205	6.2	
Turnout		3,285	28.5	
Conservative hold		Swing	▼3.5	

Prittlewell
Party	Candidate	Votes	%	±%
Liberal Democrats	Nigel Baker *	2,049	51.3	+0.9
Conservative	David Latham	1,265	31.7	−2.4
Labour	Denis Garne	512	12.8	−2.7
Liberal	Gayle Wilkinson	169	4.2	N/A
Majority		784	19.6	
Turnout		3,995	34.9	
Liberal Democrats hold		Swing	▲1.7	

Shoebury
Party	Candidate	Votes	%	±%
Conservative	David Cotgrove *	1,853	50.6	−14.4
Labour	Nigel Boorman	1,241	33.9	+9.5
Liberal Democrats	John Magnay	570	15.6	+4.9
Majority		612	16.7	
Turnout		3,664	26.8	
Conservative hold		Swing	▼12.0	

Southchurch
Party	Candidate	Votes	%	±%
Conservative	Brian Kelly *	1,588	47.8	−8.7
Labour	Reginald Copley	1,153	34.7	+5.0
Liberal	Alan Farmer	581	17.5	N/A
Majority		435	13.1	
Turnout		3,322	31.4	
Conservative hold		Swing	▼6.9	

Thorpe
Party	Candidate	Votes	%	±%
Conservative	Kay Twitchen *	1,848	61.1	−4.7
Labour	Christopher Dandridge	597	19.7	+2.6
Liberal Democrats	Steven Erlick	578	19.1	+2.0
Majority		1,251	41.4	
Turnout		3,023	27.1	
Conservative hold		Swing	▼3.7	

Victoria
Party	Candidate	Votes	%	±%
Labour	Ronald Kennedy *	2,138	65.7	+8.1
Conservative	Peter Breuer	707	21.7	−10.9
Liberal Democrats	Alistair Miller	408	12.5	+2.7
Majority		1,429	44.0	
Turnout		3,253	29.4	
Labour hold		Swing	▲9.5	

Westborough
Party	Candidate	Votes	%	±%
Liberal Democrats	Mary Lubel *	2,349	64.2	+9.8
Conservative	Richard Brown	777	21.2	−9.6
Labour	Nigel Smith	531	14.5	−0.4
Majority		1,572	43.0	
Turnout		3,657	32.5	
Liberal Democrats hold		Swing	▲9.7	

=== Tendring ===
Tendring District Summary
Party	Seats	+/-	Votes	%	+/-
Conservative	4	Steady	12,502	33.8	–6.6
Liberal Democrats	2	Steady	9,847	26.6	–2.1
Labour	1	▼1	12,003	32.4	+2.1
Independent	1	▲1	2,646	7.2	+6.6
Total	8	Steady	36,998	36.1	–3.2

Division results

Brightlingsea
Party	Candidate	Votes	%	±%
Liberal Democrats	Thomas Dale *	2,111	43.9	+4.6
Labour	Ann Olivier	1,677	34.8	+11.4
Conservative	Edward Winney	1,026	21.3	−16.0
Majority		434	9.0	
Turnout		4,814	40.2	
Liberal Democrats hold		Swing	▼3.4	

Clacton East
Party	Candidate	Votes	%	±%
Conservative	Catherine Jessop	2,010	46.4	+2.4
Labour	Joan Bond	1,236	28.5	+14.9
Liberal Democrats	Michael Lonsdale	1,089	25.1	−17.3
Majority		774	17.9	
Turnout		4,335	34.4	
Conservative hold		Swing	▼6.3	

Clacton North
Party	Candidate	Votes	%	±%
Liberal Democrats	Michael Bargent	2,249	49.2	−13.7
Labour	Kenneth Aldis	1,179	25.8	+12.1
Conservative	Michael Spencer	1,139	24.9	+1.5
Majority		1,070	23.4	
Turnout		4,567	32.5	
Liberal Democrats hold		Swing	▼12.9	

Clacton West
Party	Candidate	Votes	%	±%
Labour	Roy Smith *	3,058	65.0	+7.3
Conservative	Maurice Alexander	1,164	24.7	−8.0
Liberal Democrats	Janet Russell	486	10.3	+0.7
Majority		1,894	40.2	
Turnout		4,708	34.1	
Labour hold		Swing	▲7.7	

Frinton & Walton
Party	Candidate	Votes	%	±%
Conservative	David Rex *	3,050	55.5	−9.5
Labour	Peter Lawes	1,368	24.9	+3.8
Liberal Democrats	Annabelle Curtis	1,078	19.6	+5.7
Majority		1,682	30.6	
Turnout		5,496	36.9	
Conservative hold		Swing	▼6.7	

Harwich
Party	Candidate	Votes	%	±%
Independent	Ralph Knight *	2,646	56.7	N/A
Conservative	James Glenn	831	17.8	−9.8
Labour	Brian Theadom	829	17.8	−39.4
Liberal Democrats	Raymond Holmes	364	7.8	−7.4
Majority		1,815	38.9	
Turnout		4,670	38.7	
Independent gain from Labour		Swing	▲33.3	

Tendring Rural East
Party	Candidate	Votes	%	±%
Conservative	Charles Lumber *	1,567	42.4	−9.1
Labour	William Mixter	1,244	33.7	+0.6
Liberal Democrats	Joyce Leader	881	23.9	+8.5
Majority		323	8.7	
Turnout		3,692	34.2	
Conservative hold		Swing	▼4.9	

Tendring Rural West
Party	Candidate	Votes	%	±%
Conservative	Douglas Pallett *	1,715	36.4	−6.6
Liberal Democrats	Rosemary Smith	1,589	33.7	+10.3
Labour	Lionel Randall	1,412	29.9	+0.9
Majority		126	2.7	
Turnout		4,716	38.6	
Conservative hold		Swing	▼8.5	

=== Thurrock ===
Thurrock District Summary
Party	Seats	+/-	Votes	%	+/-
Labour	8	▲1	17,080	64.3	+9.4
Conservative	0	▼1	6,913	26.0	–10.2
Liberal Democrats	0	Steady	2,570	9.7	+4.5
Total	8	Steady	26,563	27.1	–3.2

Division results

Chadwell
Party	Candidate	Votes	%	±%
Labour	Gerard Rice *	2,727	82.5	+12.1
Conservative	Andrew Mehegan	578	17.5	−6.9
Majority		2,149	65.0	
Turnout		3,305	28.3	
Labour hold		Swing	▲9.5	

Corringham
Party	Candidate	Votes	%	±%
Labour	George Miles *	1,635	52.5	+4.6
Conservative	Robert Hunter	1,045	33.5	−9.0
Liberal Democrats	Sidney Senior	437	14.0	+4.4
Majority		590	18.9	
Turnout		3,117	29.3	
Labour hold		Swing	▲6.8	

Grays Thurrock
Party	Candidate	Votes	%	±%
Labour	Beverly Barton *	2,273	55.5	+6.3
Conservative	Douglas Sutton	1,436	35.0	−8.9
Liberal Democrats	Ian Catty	389	9.5	+2.6
Majority		837	20.4	
Turnout		4,098	29.8	
Labour hold		Swing	▲7.6	

Orsett & Stifford
Party	Candidate	Votes	%	±%
Labour	Alan Hurst	2,448	54.2	+12.8
Conservative	Clive Banbury	1,518	33.6	−18.8
Liberal Democrats	Pamela Curtis	547	12.1	+5.8
Majority		970	20.6	
Turnout		4,513	39.6	
Labour gain from Conservative		Swing	▲15.8	

South Ockendon
Party	Candidate	Votes	%	±%
Labour	Margaret Jones *	1,920	71.4	−0.9
Conservative	John Rollinson	471	17.5	−10.2
Liberal Democrats	Laurence Martin	297	11.0	N/A
Majority		1,449	53.9	
Turnout		2,688	25.1	
Labour hold		Swing	▲4.7	

Stanford-le-Hope
Party	Candidate	Votes	%	±%
Labour	Julian Norris *	1,921	57.5	+2.7
Conservative	Philip Howard	754	22.6	−14.9
Liberal Democrats	Stephen Martine	665	19.9	+12.2
Majority		1,167	34.9	
Turnout		3,340	26.4	
Labour hold		Swing	▲8.8	

Tilbury
Party	Candidate	Votes	%	±%
Labour	Patrick Bolger *	1,867	76.5	+1.3
Conservative	Marie Bamford-Burst	339	13.9	−5.0
Liberal Democrats	John Livermore	235	9.6	+3.7
Majority		1,528	62.6	
Turnout		2,441	19.5	
Labour hold		Swing	▲3.2	

West Thurrock & Aveley
Party	Candidate	Votes	%	±%
Labour	Robert Bellinger	2,289	74.8	+33.1
Conservative	Henry Cook	772	25.2	−5.0
Majority		1,517	49.6	
Turnout		3,061	21.1	
Labour hold		Swing	▲19.1	

=== Uttlesford ===
Uttlesford District Summary
Party	Seats	+/-	Votes	%	+/-
Liberal Democrats	3	▲3	8,918	43.7	+13.6
Conservative	1	▼3	8,324	40.8	–8.0
Labour	0	Steady	3,177	15.6	–3.9
Total	4	Steady	20,419	40.4	–0.1

Division results

Dunmow
Party	Candidate	Votes	%	±%
Conservative	David Westcott *	2,189	49.3	−12.8
Liberal Democrats	Christine Little	1,625	36.6	+16.4
Labour	William McCarthy	622	14.0	−3.7
Majority		564	12.7	
Turnout		4,436	38.6	
Conservative hold		Swing	▼14.6	

Saffron Walden
Party	Candidate	Votes	%	±%
Liberal Democrats	John Lefever	2,436	39.2	+12.5
Conservative	Stephen Neville *	2,084	33.5	−3.8
Labour	Russell Green	1,699	27.3	−3.5
Majority		352	5.7	
Turnout		6,219	41.5	
Liberal Democrats gain from Conservative		Swing	▲8.2	

Stansted
Party	Candidate	Votes	%	±%
Liberal Democrats	Melvin Caton	2,959	53.6	+12.1
Conservative	Philip Duly *	2,183	39.5	−8.9
Labour	Keith Williams	382	6.9	−3.2
Majority		776	14.0	
Turnout		5,524	43.6	
Liberal Democrats gain from Conservative		Swing	▲10.5	

Thaxted
Party	Candidate	Votes	%	±%
Liberal Democrats	John Gibb	1,898	44.8	+14.3
Conservative	John Whitehead *	1,868	44.1	−9.9
Labour	Brian Lock	474	11.2	−4.3
Majority		30	0.7	
Turnout		4,240	37.2	
Liberal Democrats gain from Conservative		Swing	▲12.1	

== By-elections ==
=== Tendring Rural West ===
Tendring Rural West by-election: 22 September 1994
Party	Candidate	Votes	%	±%
Labour		1,260	35.6	+5.7
Conservative		1,197	33.9	–2.5
Liberal Democrats		999	28.3	–5.4
Green		80	2.3	N/A
Majority		63	1.7	N/A
Turnout		3,536	29.0	
Registered electors		12,193		
Labour gain from Conservative		Swing	▲4.1	
