= Porky's Railroad =

1937 film by Frank Tashlin

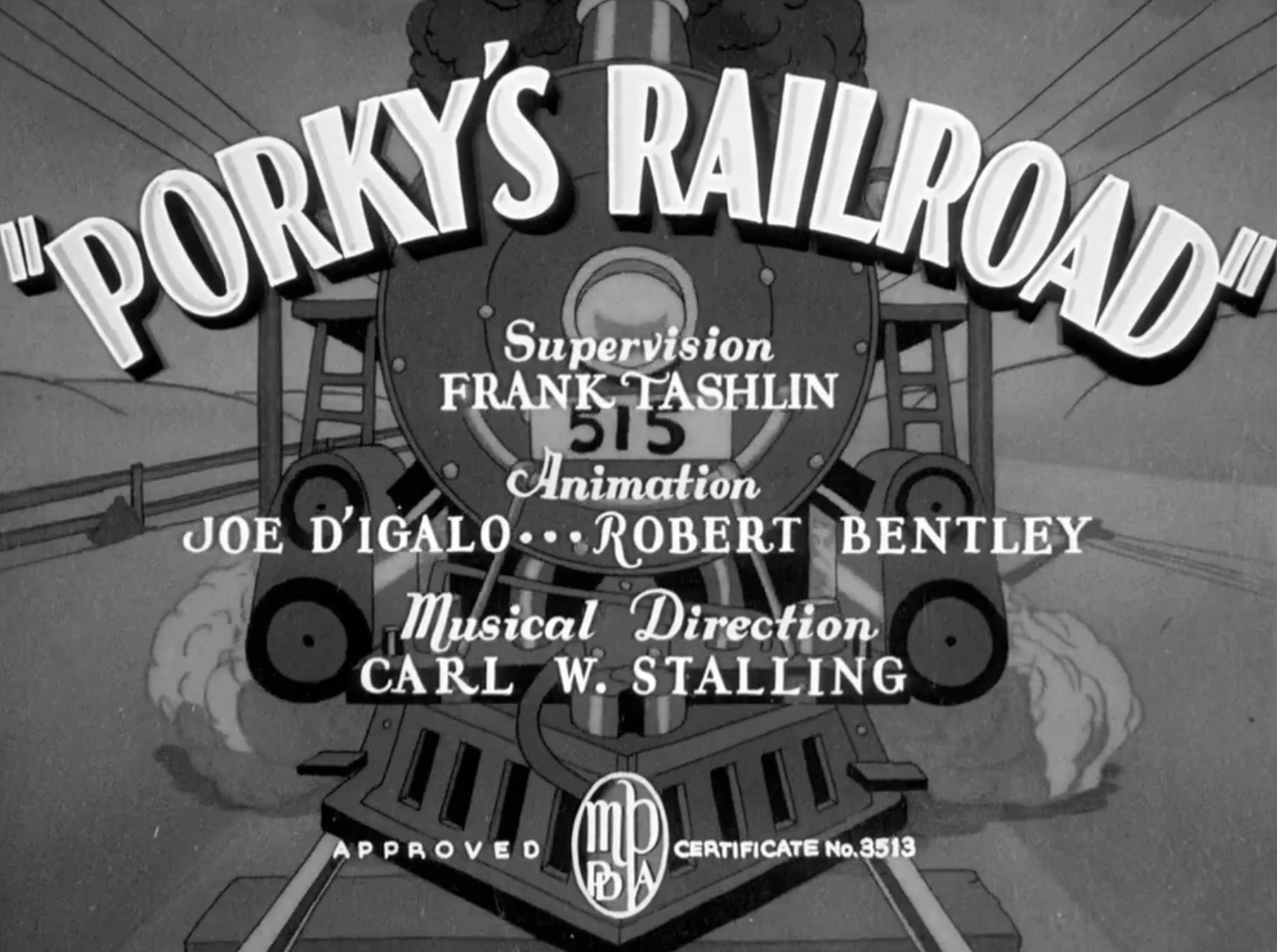
- Title card
- Directed by: Frank Tashlin
- Produced by: Leon Schlesinger
- Starring: Mel Blanc; Billy Bletcher
- Music by: Carl W. Stalling
- Animation by: Joe D'Igalo; Robert Bentley
- Color process: Black-and-white
- Production company: Leon Schlesinger Productions
- Distributed by: Warner Bros. Productions; The Vitaphone Corporation
- Release date: August 7, 1937
- Running time: 7 min
- Country: United States
- Language: English

Porky's Railroad is a 1937 American animated comedy short film directed by Frank Tashlin. The short was released on August 7, 1937. It is the 89th film in the Looney Tunes series and the 27th cartoon to feature Porky Pig.

== Plot ==
A large crack train named the 30th Century Limited speeds through the tracks. Porky operates the 15th Century Unlimited, an extremely outdated and tattered crack train which he nicknames Toots. It attempts to crawl a steep slope at Piker's Peak and slows to a point which a snail casually outruns it. When it stops altogether, Porky uses black pepper to cause the train to sneeze and speed up to a competent level. Spotting the larger train, Porky is barely able to keep it from hitting the last carriage of his train. Porky then spots a cow who refuses to budge, but relents begrudgingly, after which a bull crosses and respectfully stands at the corner, but Porky believes its visible tail to be the cow's, until he realizes and drives away.

Porky is stopped and handed a notice that he will be fired and replaced by a streamliner named "The Silver Fish", whose operator passes by, mocks Porky and challenges him to a race. At the starting pistol, the streamliner's acceleration mangles Porky's train while it passes by a "nigger in the woodpile", then onto a drawbridge. Porky, speeding to catch up, barely misses the drawbridge while it is lifted to make way for the ship 'S.S Leon", accidentally picking up a life preserver and an anchor and unaware sailor in the process. The bull from earlier witnesses Porky and, in a mad dash for retaliation, destroys all carriages but the driver's seat, but accidentally launching Porky across the finishing line. With his train destroyed, Porky receives compensation in the form of the streamliner, which he operates while disposing of his old train in one last ride.

== Home media ==
- DVD – Looney Tunes Golden Collection: Volume 4, Disc 2
- DVD – Porky Pig 101, Disc 2

== See also ==
- 1937 in film
- Porky Pig filmography
- Looney Tunes and Merrie Melodies filmography (1930–1939)
- List of animated films in the public domain in the United States
