= Burned Haystack Dating Method =

Online dating method

The Burned Haystack Dating Method is a dating method to help women find more success with their online dating lives. It was created by writer and professor Jennie Young. The method has clear "rules" for using dating apps to "burn the haystack," i.e., find the proper dating match.

== The Method ==
The method is called the 10-rule Burned Haystack Method.

=== Block to burn ===
One of the method's perhaps most controversial rules is known as, "Block to burn." Meaning, if you do not wish to meet a person for a potential date you block them on the app to avoid seeing their profile again.

Creator Jennie Young has stated that followers of the Burned Haystack Method use it to, "narrow the field."

== Book ==
Burn the Haystack
- Book cover
- Author: Jennie Young
- Language: English
- Subject: Online dating, relationships
- Genre: Non-fiction
- Published: April 2026
- Publisher: HarperCollins
- Publication place: United States

A non-fiction book version of the method written by Young is set to be published by HarperCollins in April 2026, entitled Burn the Haystack: Decode Dating, Torch the Duds, and Make Room for Men Who Matter.

== Origins ==
The New York Times Magazine reported on the Burned Haystack Dating Method in their 2024 issue about online dating after the age of fifty.
