= Sibghat Kadri =

British barrister (1937–2021)

Sibghatullah Kadri QC (23 April 1937 – 2 November 2021) was a British barrister and a Chair of the Society of Black Lawyers. He was the country's first Pakistani and Muslim Queen's Counsel barrister.

Kadri was born in the United Provinces, British India (now Uttar Pradesh) on 23 April 1937 into a Sunni Muslim family. He was involved in student movements in Karachi, Pakistan before martial law was imposed on the country.

When he moved to Britain, Kadri joined the Labour Party and worked for Inland Revenue, the Post Office and BBC Urdu. He was called to the Bar in 1969 and became a lawyer with an interest in civil rights. He was appointed to the Queen's Counsel in 1989.

He died from cancer on 2 November 2021, at the age of 84.
