= Bill Dixon-Smith, Baron Dixon-Smith =

British farmer and Conservative Party politician

The Right Honourable The Lord Dixon-Smith DL
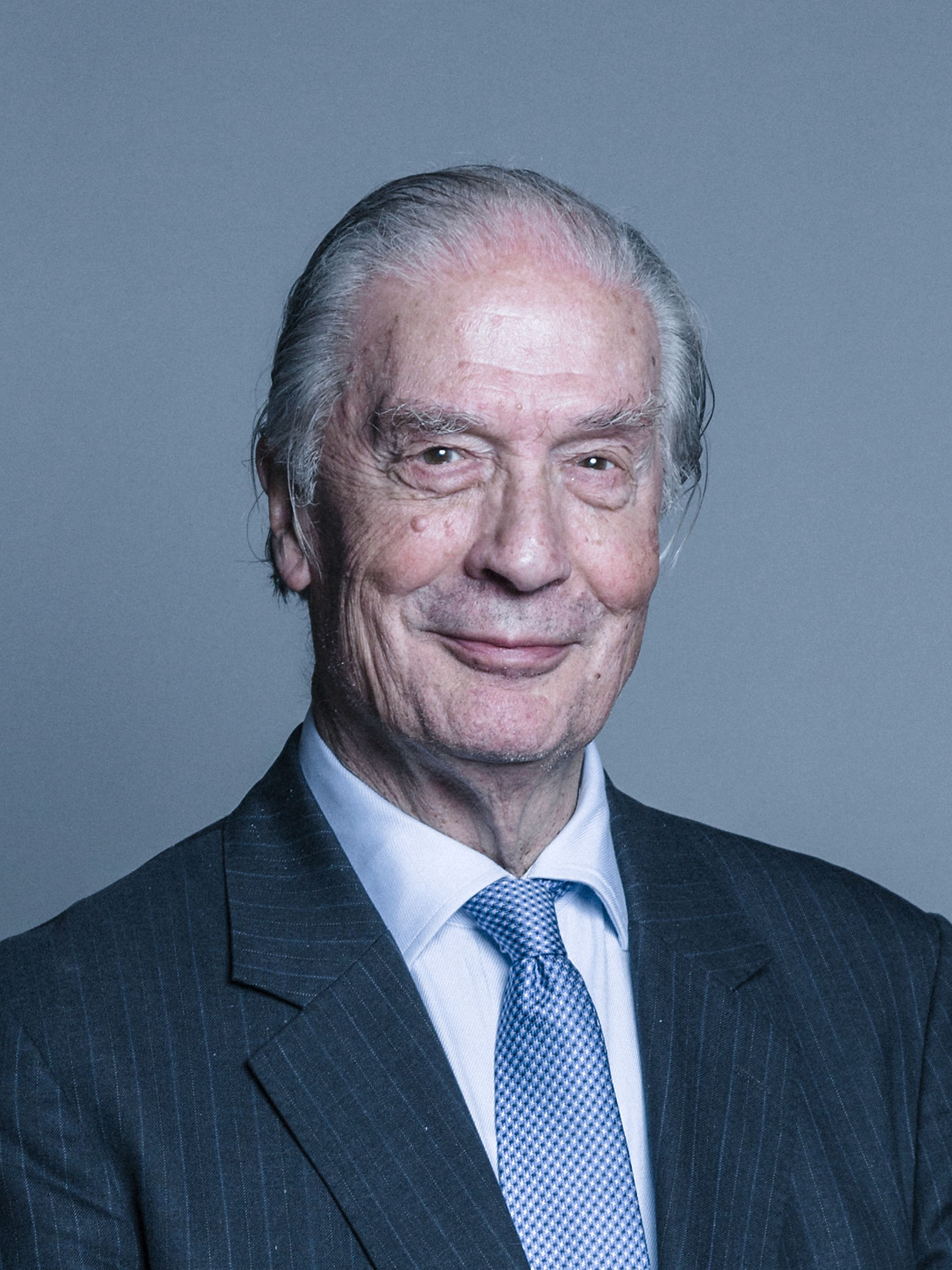
- Official 2018 parliamentary portrait

Member of the House of Lords
- Lord Temporal
- Life peerage 11 October 1993 – 7 November 2023

Member of Essex County Council for Braintree East Coggeshall (1965–1981)
- In office 1965 – 6 May 1993
- Succeeded by: Elwyn Bishop

Personal details
- Born: 30 September 1934 (age 92)
- Party: Conservative
- Spouse: Georgina Cook (m. 1960)
- Children: 2
- Education: Oundle School

Robert William Dixon-Smith, Baron Dixon-Smith, DL (born 30 September 1934), is a British farmer and Conservative Party politician. Lord Dixon-Smith is a former Shadow Minister at the Department for Communities and Local Government.

== Early life and career ==
The son of Dixon and Alice Winifred Smith, Dixon-Smith was educated at Oundle School, at the St. Johnsbury Academy in Vermont, and Writtle Agricultural College in Essex. He served in the King's Dragoon Guards in the years 1956 and 1957, serving as a Second Lieutenant.

From 1967 to 1994, Dixon-Smith was Governor of the Writtle Agricultural College, from 1973 to 1985 chair. In 1993 and 1994, he was Chair of Anglia Polytechnic University governors, governor from 1973 to 2000 of what was originally Cambridgeshire College of Arts and Technology (now Anglia Ruskin University).

Dixon-Smith was elected to the Essex County Council in 1965, being vice chairman from 1983 to 1986, and chairman from 1986 to 1989 before losing his seat to Labour in 1993. He was briefly Shadow Minister for Environment. In 1994, he was made an Honorary Doctor at Anglia Ruskin University.

== Life peer ==
On 11 October 1993, he was created a life peer as Baron Dixon-Smith, of Bocking in the County of Essex. In December 1998, he was appointed the Conservatives' local government spokesman in the House of Lords by party leader William Hague.

=== Use of controversial idiom ===
In July 2008, he was forced to apologise to the chamber after using the racist idiom, "nigger in the woodpile", during a House of Lords debate. Dixon-Smith said the phrase had "slipped out without my thinking", and that "It was common parlance when I was younger". He added, "I apologise, I left my brains behind".

He ceased to be a member of the House of Lords on 7 November 2023 after not attending the House during Session 2022–23.

== Personal life ==
Lord Dixon-Smith was married to Georgina Janet Cook from 1960 until her death in 2026. They have one son and one daughter.

== Arms ==
Coat of arms of Bill Dixon-Smith, Baron Dixon-Smith
Crest A garb Or to the sinister and to the dexter resting its tail thereon a dolphin urinant Vert fins and tail also Gold. Escutcheon Argent a lion sejant erect Azure gorged with a baron's coronet Proper holding in the dexter forepaw a seax Proper hilt pommel and quillons Or and resting the sinister forepaw on a garb also Gold. Supporters Two lions sejant erect Azure ermined Or each resting the exterior forepaw upon a garb also Gold. Motto Spes Aspera Levat

Orders of precedence in the United Kingdom
Preceded by The Lord Haskel	Gentlemen; Baron Dixon-Smith	Followed by The Lord Tugendhat
