= Liverpool Civil and Family Court =

Court building in Liverpool, England

Coordinates: 53.40934°N 2.98986°W

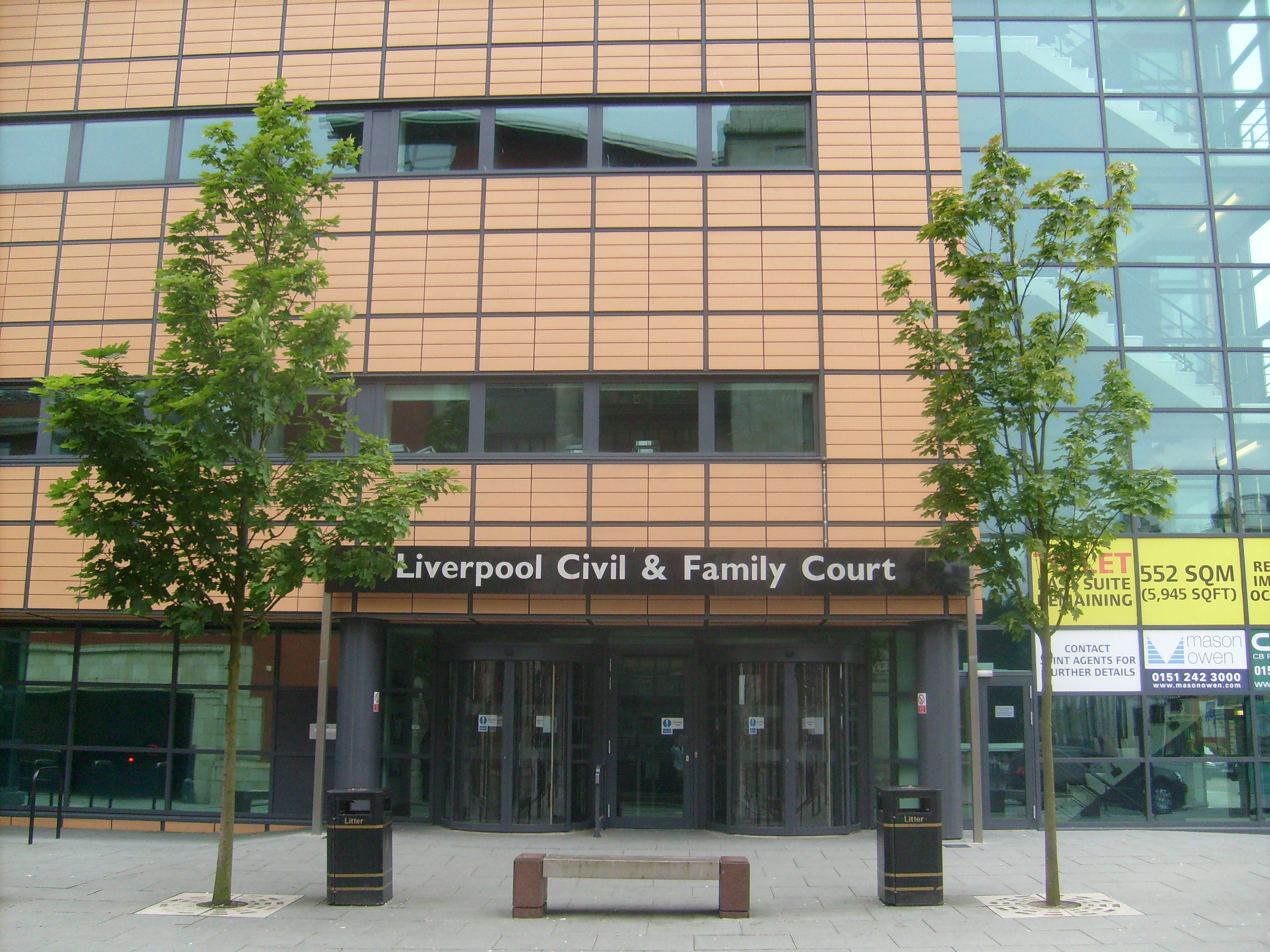
- Liverpool Civil and Family Court
- Interactive map of the Liverpool Civil and Family Court area

General information
- Location: Liverpool, England
- Opened: May 2006
- Client: His Majesty's Courts Service

The Liverpool Civil and Family Court, Vernon Street Liverpool, England. It is operated by His Majesty's Courts Service.

The building contains the city's county court and family court. The court started operating from May 2006, although was not official opened until November 2006. The building brought together all civil and family cases under one roof, which had previously been heard at various venues around the region. Upon opening, the court included 29 courtrooms and 31 rooms for consultation.
