= Society of Black Lawyers =

British group for lawyers of colour

The Society of Black Lawyers (SBL) is a British organisation of African, Asian and Caribbean lawyers.

== Formation ==
The SBL was founded in the United Kingdom by Rudy Narayan in 1969, as the Afro-Asian and Caribbean Lawyers Association. By 1981, it was known as its current name. It was co-chaired by Narayan and Sibghat Kadri.

== Aims ==
It aims to promote the rights and welfare of lawyers of colour, as well the rights of people of colour in the community who need legal protection or are facing harassment.

== President ==
Since 1984, its chair has been Peter Herbert, a retired judge.

== See also ==
- National Conference of Black Lawyers (US)
- Political blackness
