= Peter Herbert (lawyer) =

Peter Herbert OBE is a British barrister and political activist. He was described by The Independent as "one of Britain's only non-white judges",

== Career ==
He was an independent member and vice-chair of the Metropolitan Police Authority from 2000 to 2008, a "part-time recorder in the crown court as well as a part-time immigration and employment tribunal judge and chair of the Society of Black Lawyers". He was appointed Officer of the Order of the British Empire (OBE) in the 2010 New Year Honours. He retired from his judicial roles in 2020, moving to Kenya.

== Racism in football ==
Herbert has campaigned against racism in football with the Society of Black Lawyers, which he has chaired since 1984, aiming to inform the police of every "racial conflict" in the game.

== Controversy ==
Herbert was at the centre of a controversy over the years 2015–2017 after suggesting that racism was present in the British judicial system. In a speech at a Defend Democracy event in Stepney, Tower Hamlets (east London), in April 2015, Herbert said: "Racism is alive and well and living in Tower Hamlets, in Westminster and, yes, sometimes in the judiciary." He further said that ethnic minorities "should not place their faith in a justice system that had not been designed for them" but should "take direct action". He also criticised the "decision to bar the former mayor of Tower Hamlets, Lutfur Rahman, from holding public office for five years". A complaint was made about his speech to the Judicial Conduct Investigations Office (JCIO). On 15 November 2015, members of the judiciary tried to pressure Herbert into refraining from sitting as a judge. In 2016, Herbert sued the Ministry of Justice for recommending that a formal warning be made against him.

In January 2017, the disciplinary panel investigating Herbert said he should be given an apology from "a suitable senior person" for the treatment he received from other members of the judiciary, and that he should also receive a dressing down for his comments in the speech, which were deemed to be misconduct ("because of the inferred criticism that another judge had given a judgment [about Rahman] on racial grounds") and because the speech was "likely to undermine public confidence in the judiciary". Herbert appealed to the JCIO against the decision, saying that the panel had racially discriminated against him and that their treatment of him had made him feel "like a nigger". In his defence and as an example of double standards in the judiciary's treatment of fellow judges, Herbert pointed to Supreme Court Judge Lord Neuberger's apparent criticism of his colleague Lady Justice Hale's comments "relating to the court case on whether Parliament must be given a say on Brexit" – a criticism for which Lord Neuberger was not disciplined. Herbert received an apology from the judicial conduct investigation office in August 2020 in relation to the case. He had made claims of racism, victimisation and harassment, which were due to be heard at an employment tribunal in July 2021, but the case was settled before the hearing date. Herbert said that he had successfully held senior judges to account. The Lord Chief Justice and the Lord Chancellor said that Herbert's claims were robustly denied and that the settlement was made with no acceptance of wrongdoing or liability.
