= West Yorkshire County Council =

UK local government administrative body

- Coat of arms

Type
- Type: Metropolitan county council

History
- Established: 1 April 1974
- Disbanded: 31 March 1986
- Preceded by: Various authorities, including West Riding County Council
- Succeeded by: 5 boroughs and various agencies, including West Yorkshire Joint Services
- Seats: 88

Elections
- First election: 1973
- Last election: 1981

Meeting place
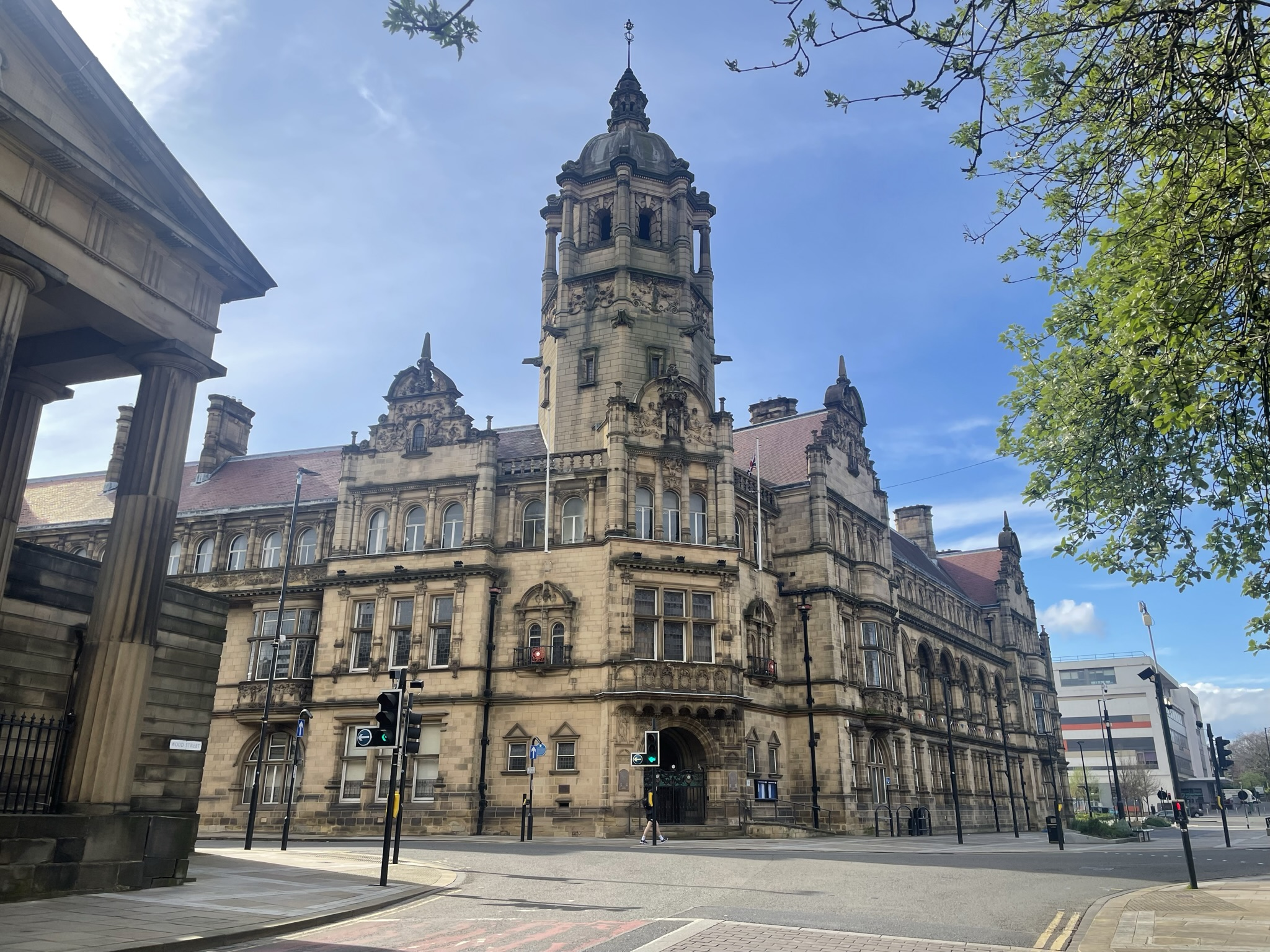
- County Hall, Wakefield, England

West Yorkshire County Council (WYCC) – also known as West Yorkshire Metropolitan County Council (WYMCC) – was the top-tier local government administrative body for West Yorkshire from 1974 to 1986. A strategic authority, with responsibilities for roads, public transport, planning, emergency services and waste disposal, it was composed of 88 directly elected members. Lower tier district-level functions were provided by the county's five metropolitan district councils, who took over the county council's functions on its abolition in 1986.

== History ==
The metropolitan county of West Yorkshire and its county council were established in 1974 under the Local Government Act 1972. The first elections to the county council were held in 1973. For its first year it was a shadow authority, acting alongside the area's outgoing authorities, until the new administrative areas and their councils formally came into being on 1 April 1974.

Its headquarters were County Hall in Wakefield, which had been completed in 1898 for West Riding County Council, one of West Yorkshire County Council's predecessors. The Coat of arms of West Yorkshire Metropolitan County Council was granted by letters patent in 1975.

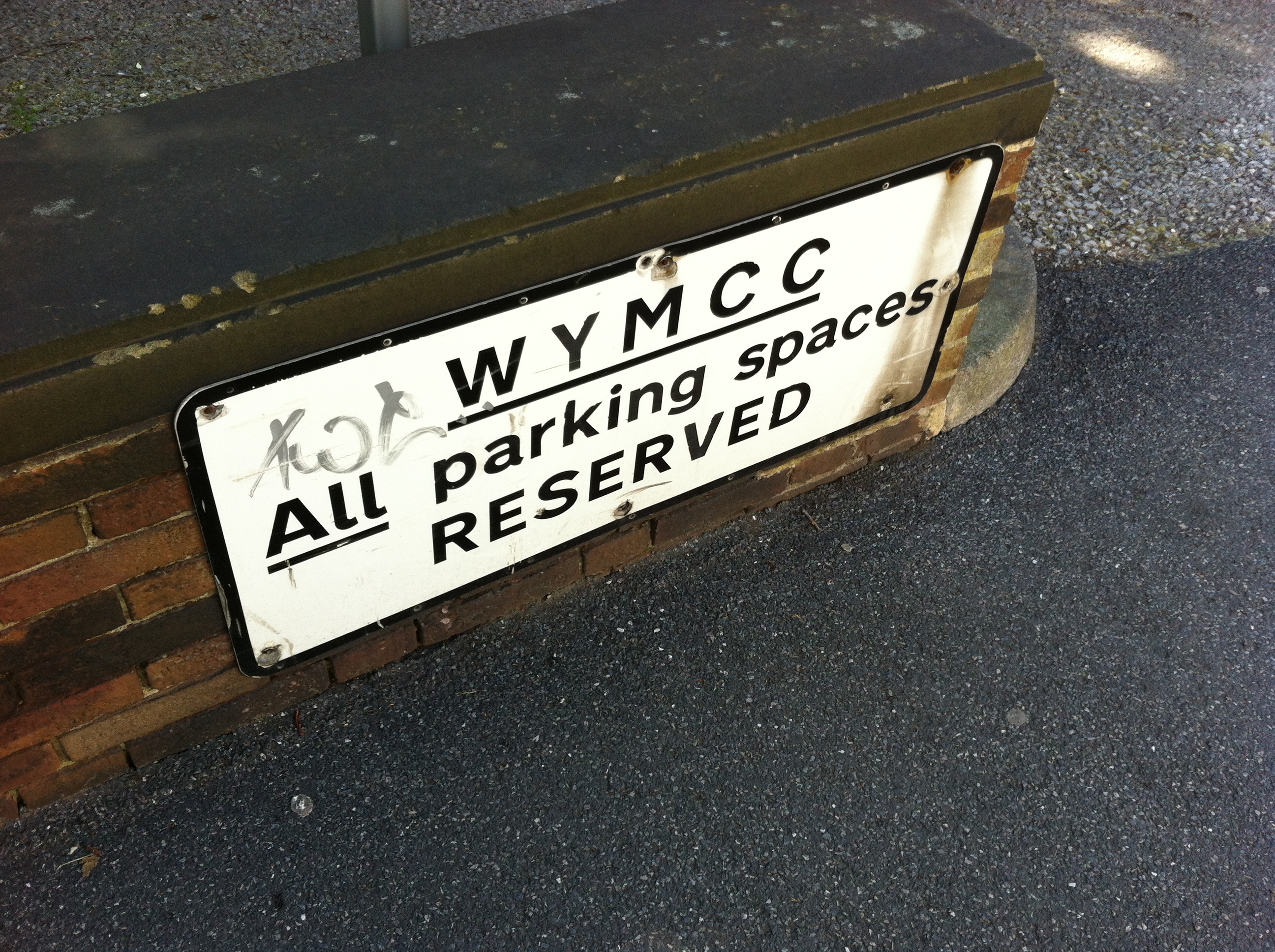
A former West Yorkshire Metropolitan County Council sign found outside the West Yorkshire Archives, Wakefield

The county council was abolished on 31 March 1986 under the Local Government Act 1985. Its powers were passed to the county's five metropolitan district councils: City of Bradford Metropolitan District Council, Calderdale Council, Kirklees Council, Leeds City Council and Wakefield Metropolitan District Council. Some powers of the county council (including emergency services and public transport) passed to county-wide joint boards of the five district councils, such as the West Yorkshire Joint Services.

== Political control ==
Political control of the council from when it formally came into being in 1974 until its abolition in 1986 was as follows:

Party in control	Years
Labour	1973–1977
Conservative	1977–1981
Labour	1981–1986

=== Leadership ===
The leaders of the council were:

Councillor	Party	From	To
Eddie Newby	Labour	1 Apr 1974	May 1976
Ken Woolmer	Labour	May 1976	May 1977
Tom Batty	Conservative	May 1977	18 May 1978
Royston Moore	Conservative	18 May 1978	May 1981
John Gunnell	Labour	May 1981	31 Mar 1986

== Election results ==
Year	Labour	Conservative	Liberals	Others
1973 (period of office 1974–77)	51	25	11	1
1977	30	54	4	0
1981	63	14	11	0

- 1973 West Yorkshire County Council election
- 1977 West Yorkshire County Council election
- 1981 West Yorkshire County Council election

== Successor bodies ==
After the council was abolished in 1986, power was devolved to the five constituent district councils of Bradford, Calderdale, Kirklees, Leeds and Wakefield. Some council functions including archive services and Trading Standards continued to be provided jointly, through West Yorkshire Joint Services, and the West Yorkshire Passenger Transport Executive and West Yorkshire Police continue to operate across the county.

In 2012, plans to revive a top-tier administrative combined authority for West Yorkshire were revealed, with Peter McBride, cabinet member for housing and investment and councillor for Kirklees, stating "what we are recreating in effect is the West Yorkshire County Council in another form, which the government abolished in 1986 but has come to realise that you need a body of that size". The West Yorkshire Combined Authority was created in April 2014.
