= 1981 Hampshire County Council election =

United Kingdom local election

- 7 May 1981

All 102 seats to Hampshire County Council 52 seats needed for a majority
	First party	Second party	Third party
Party	Conservative	Labour	Liberal
Seats before	88	7	0
Seats won	62	31	7
Seat change	▼26	▲24	▲7
Popular vote	189,740	133,133	95,548
Percentage	43.9	30.8	22.1
Swing	▼21.3	▲8.5	▲14.1
	Fourth party
Party	Independent
Seats before	1
Seats won	2
Seat change	▲1
Popular vote	8,488
Percentage	2.0
Swing	▲0.3
Council control before election
Freddie Emery-Wallis
Conservative
Council control after election
Freddie Emery-Wallis
Conservative

Elections to Hampshire County Council took place on 7 May 1981 as part of the 1981 United Kingdom local elections. All seats were up for election, with each ward returning one councillor by first-past-the-post voting for a four-year term. The electoral boundries were changed and increased the number of seats from 97 to 102.

== Summary ==
=== Election result ===
1981 Hampshire County Council election
Party	Candidates	Seats	Gains	Losses	Net gain/loss	Seats %	Votes %	Votes	+/−
Conservative	99	62	N/A	N/A	▼26	60.8	43.9	189,740	▼21.3
Labour	100	31	N/A	N/A	▲24	30.4	30.8	133,133	▲8.5
Liberal	86	7	N/A	N/A	▲7	6.9	22.1	95,548	▲14.1
Independent	9	2	N/A	N/A	▲1	2.0	2.0	8,488	▲0.3
Residents	3	0	N/A	N/A	Steady	0.0	0.7	3,055	▼0.8
DVE	9	0	N/A	N/A	Steady	0.0	0.4	1,568	new
National Front	3	0	N/A	N/A	Steady	0.0	0.1	221	new
Independent Labour	1	0	N/A	N/A	Steady	0.0	0.0	163	new
Workers Revolutionary	1	0	N/A	N/A	Steady	0.0	0.0	107	new
Rate Reform	1	0	N/A	N/A	Steady	0.0	0.0	100	new
BNP	1	0	N/A	N/A	Steady	0.0	0.0	79	new

== Results by ward ==
=== Basingstoke and Deane ===
==== Basingstoke East ====
Party	Candidate	Votes	%	±%
Conservative	D. Keep	1,325	51.8	
Labour	S. Brocklehurst	704	27.5	
Liberal	J. Batten	529	20.7	
Majority		621	24.3	
Turnout		2558	38.1	
Conservative win (new seat)				

==== Basingstoke North ====
Party	Candidate	Votes	%	±%
Labour	B. Wratten	3,208	74.1	
Conservative	J. Smith	865	20.0	
DVE	R. Unthank	147	3.4	
Workers Revolutionary	G. Griffin	107	2.5	
Majority		2343	54.1	
Turnout		4227	37.3	
Labour win (new seat)				

==== Basingstoke North West ====
Party	Candidate	Votes	%	±%
Labour	J. McAllister	2,541	60.1	
Conservative	K. Irons	1,443	34.1	
DVE	N. Duncan	242	5.7	
Majority		1098	26.0	
Turnout		4226	38.7	
Labour win (new seat)				

==== Basingstoke South ====
Party	Candidate	Votes	%	±%
Conservative	K. Brant	1,842	50.5	
Labour	R. Donnelly	1,806	49.5	
Majority		36	1.0	
Turnout		3648	36.6	
Conservative win (new seat)				

==== Basingstoke West ====
Party	Candidate	Votes	%	±%
Labour	M. Morris	3,377	70.1	
Conservative	D. Fell	1,243	25.8	
DVE	G. Evans	198	4.1	
Majority		2134	44.3	
Turnout		4818	39.6	
Labour win (new seat)				

==== Candovers ====
Party	Candidate	Votes	%	±%
Conservative	M. Boyle	2,687	72.8	
Labour	M. Corfin	1,006	27.2	
Majority		1681	45.5	
Turnout		3693	35.2	
Conservative win (new seat)				

==== Kingsclere and Tadley ====
Party	Candidate	Votes	%	±%
Liberal	C. Curtis	2,260	46.0	
Conservative	M. Walford	1,961	39.9	
Labour	S. Bloomfield	693	14.1	
Majority		299	6.1	
Turnout		4914	43.1	
Liberal win (new seat)				

==== Loddon ====
Party	Candidate	Votes	%	±%
Conservative	J. Jack	2,237	71.8	
Labour	B. Strawson	877	28.2	
Majority		1360	43.7	
Turnout		3114	39.3	
Conservative win (new seat)				

==== Whitchurch and Clere ====
Party	Candidate	Votes	%	±%
Conservative	T. McNamara	2,563	47.8	
Liberal	W. Lovegrove	1,333	24.9	
Labour	S. Rogers	1,151	21.5	
Independent	P. Davies	310	5.8	
Majority		1230	23.0	
Turnout		5357	45.6	
Conservative win (new seat)				

=== East Hampshire ===
==== Alton ====
Party	Candidate	Votes	%	±%
Conservative	H. West	2,202	43.7	
Liberal	R. Booker	1,891	37.6	
Labour	V. Lane	942	18.7	
Majority		311	6.2	
Turnout		5035	46.9	
Conservative win (new seat)				

==== Bramshott ====
Party	Candidate	Votes	%	±%
Conservative	J. Kirke	2,706	52.6	
Liberal	R. Hargreaves	1,892	36.8	
Labour	R. Partner	542	10.5	
Majority		814	15.8	
Turnout		5140	45.2	
Conservative win (new seat)				

==== Catherington ====
Party	Candidate	Votes	%	±%
Conservative	L. White	2,900	55.7	
Liberal	P. Rogers	2,000	38.4	
Labour	B. Clough	302	5.8	
Majority		900	17.3	
Turnout		5202	44.6	
Conservative win (new seat)				

==== Headley ====
Party	Candidate	Votes	%	±%
Conservative	B. Blacker	2,271	50.0	
Liberal	J. Eames	1,770	39.0	
Labour	W. Gardiner	500	11.0	
Majority		501	11.0	
Turnout		4541	39.8	
Conservative win (new seat)				

==== Medstead and Selborne ====
Party	Candidate	Votes	%	±%
Conservative	J. Scott	2,523	59.7	
Liberal	P. Ravenscroft	1,423	33.7	
Labour	R. Roberts	280	6.6	
Majority		1100	26.0	
Turnout		4226	48.0	
Conservative win (new seat)				

==== Petersfield ====
Party	Candidate	Votes	%	±%
Liberal	K. Bulmer	2,604	45.2	
Conservative	H. Rose	2,272	39.4	
Independent	R. Digby	461	8.0	
Labour	C. Atherton	426	7.4	
Majority		332	5.8	
Turnout		5763	48.5	
Liberal win (new seat)				

=== Eastleigh ===
==== Bishopstoke & Central ====
Party	Candidate	Votes	%	±%
Labour	M. Garnett	2,188	45.0	
Liberal	W. Irish	1,423	29.3	
Conservative	M. Tyrrell	1,253	25.8	
Majority		765	15.7	
Turnout		4864	45.0	
Labour win (new seat)				

==== Botley & Hedge ====
Party	Candidate	Votes	%	±%
Conservative	N. Turner	1,787	43.7	
Liberal	D. Baxter	1,234	30.2	
Labour	B. Paget	1,069	26.1	
Majority		553	13.5	
Turnout		4090	36.6	
Conservative win (new seat)				

==== Chandlers Ford ====
Party	Candidate	Votes	%	±%
Liberal	G. Smith	1,983	50.7	
Conservative	E. Greenwood	1,668	42.7	
Labour	G. Blatchford	258	6.6	
Majority		315	8.1	
Turnout		3909	47.9	
Liberal win (new seat)				

==== Fair Oak and West End ====
Party	Candidate	Votes	%	±%
Liberal	G. Aplin	2,167	51.1	
Conservative	M. Robinson	1,551	36.6	
Labour	J. Davis	525	12.4	
Majority		616	14.5	
Turnout		4243	45.1	
Liberal win (new seat)				

==== Hound ====
Party	Candidate	Votes	%	±%
Conservative	A. Shotter	2,152	45.3	
Labour	D. Hewittt	1,441	30.3	
Liberal	R. Stiles	1,158	24.4	
Majority		711	15.0	
Turnout		4751	46.3	
Conservative win (new seat)				

==== North ====
Party	Candidate	Votes	%	±%
Conservative	M. Latham	2,059	49.1	
Labour	M. Harling	1,164	27.7	
Liberal	T. Brown	972	23.2	
Majority		885	21.3	
Turnout		4195	40.8	
Conservative win (new seat)				

==== South ====
Party	Candidate	Votes	%	±%
Labour	S. Bartlet	2,500	59.1	
Conservative	S. Platford	1,081	25.6	
Liberal	M. Jones	647	15.3	
Majority		1419	33.6	
Turnout		4228	46.1	
Labour win (new seat)				

=== Fareham ===
==== Fareham Crofton ====
Party	Candidate	Votes	%	±%
Conservative	J. Collet	1,969	48.1	
Liberal	D. Burton-Jenkins	1,789	43.7	
Labour	B. Townsend	333	8.1	
Majority		180	4.4	
Turnout		4091	45.0	
Conservative win (new seat)				

==== Fareham North West ====
Party	Candidate	Votes	%	±%
Conservative	P. Robinson	1,485	40.3	
Labour	S. Cunningham	1,377	37.4	
Liberal	M. Kanye	820	22.3	
Majority		108	2.9	
Turnout		3682	36.9	
Conservative win (new seat)				

==== Fareham Portchester ====
Party	Candidate	Votes	%	±%
Conservative	R. Ryann	1,548	34.8	
Labour	A. Dunne	1,398	31.5	
Independent	D. Hooper	698	15.7	
Liberal	M. Willaims	437	9.8	
Independent	R. Cooper	364	8.2	
Majority		150	3.4	
Turnout		4445	40.5	
Conservative win (new seat)				

==== Fareham South East ====
Party	Candidate	Votes	%	±%
Conservative	S. Trott	1,780	47.1	
Labour	H. Burstow	1,326	35.1	
Liberal	C. Phillips	675	17.9	
Majority		454	12.0	
Turnout		3781	31.6	
Conservative win (new seat)				

==== Fareham Titchfield ====
Party	Candidate	Votes	%	±%
Conservative	N. Matthews	2,208	53.1	
Liberal	B. Brown	1,399	33.6	
Labour	D. Light	522	13.3	
Majority		809	19.5	
Turnout		4129	38.9	
Conservative win (new seat)				

==== Fareham Western Wards ====
Party	Candidate	Votes	%	±%
Conservative	E. Lunson	2,315	53.0	
Liberal	L. Newbury	1,494	34.2	
Labour	A. Rotherford	561	12.8	
Majority		821	18.8	
Turnout		4360	35.6	
Conservative win (new seat)				

=== Gosport ===
==== Gosport Town ====
Party	Candidate	Votes	%	±%
Conservative	J. Goss	2,400	55.8	
Labour	S. Jordan	854	19.9	
Liberal	S. Herridge	640	14.9	
Independent	M. Perry	406	9.4	
Majority		1546	36.0	
Turnout		4300	40.4	
Conservative win (new seat)				

==== Hardway ====
Party	Candidate	Votes	%	±%
Conservative	A. Taylor	2,122	48.2	
Labour	K. Searle	1,497	34.0	
Liberal	B. Irvine	784	17.8	
Majority		625	14.2	
Turnout		4403	39.6	
Conservative win (new seat)				

==== Lee ====
Party	Candidate	Votes	%	±%
Conservative	R. Millard	2,080	58.1	
Liberal	B. Cresswell	1,105	30.9	
Labour	A. Mason	395	11.0	
Majority		975	27.2	
Turnout		3580	34.2	
Conservative win (new seat)				

==== Leesland ====
Party	Candidate	Votes	%	±%
Conservative	W. Newstead	1,947	45.5	
Labour	S. Cully	1,749	40.8	
Liberal	R. Chuter	587	13.7	
Majority		198	4.6	
Turnout		4283	38.6	
Conservative win (new seat)				

==== Rowner ====
Party	Candidate	Votes	%	±%
Labour	S. Leyland	2,161	50.1	
Conservative	A. Marks	1,589	36.9	
Liberal	P. Shankland	483	11.2	
BNL	T. Tappenden	79	1.8	
Majority		572	13.3	
Turnout		4292	38.2	
Conservative win (new seat)				

=== Hart ===
==== Fleet ====
Party	Candidate	Votes	%	±%
Independent	K. Jessovala	2,740	58.8	
Conservative	F. Graham-Taylor	1,670	35.8	
Liberal	R. Syrett	249	5.3	
Majority		1070	46.2	
Turnout		4659	23.0	
Independent win (new seat)				

==== Hartley Whitney ====
Party	Candidate	Votes	%	±%
Conservative	M. Hudson	2,624	56.7	
Liberal	N. Sheffield	1,555	33.6	
Labour	F. Jones	449	9.7	
Majority		1069	23.1	
Turnout		4628	41.2	
Conservative win (new seat)				

==== Hawley and Church Crookham ====
Party	Candidate	Votes	%	±%
Liberal	B. Harris	1,671	40.3	
Conservative	A. Lemmings	1,344	32.4	
Independent	A. Ecclestone	820	19.8	
Labour	I. Plested	312	7.5	
Majority		327	7.9	
Turnout		4147	42.8	
Liberal win (new seat)				

==== Oldiham ====
Party	Candidate	Votes	%	±%
Conservative	J. Stancliffe	2,901	66.7	
Liberal	J. Hurst	965	22.2	
Labour	T. Bridgeman	486	11.2	
Majority		1936	44.5	
Turnout		4352	38.5	
Conservative win (new seat)				

==== Yateley ====
Party	Candidate	Votes	%	±%
Liberal	M. Legg	2,512	58.0	
Residents	A. Gwynn	1,373	31.7	
Labour	J. Davies	449	10.4	
Majority		1139	26.3	
Turnout		4334	40.1	
Liberal win (new seat)				

=== Havant ===
==== Barncroft and Warren Park ====
Party	Candidate	Votes	%	±%
Labour	B. Smith	1,555	63.2	
Liberal	L. Hutchings	907	36.8	
Majority		648	26.3	
Turnout		2462	24.2	
Labour win (new seat)				

==== Battins and Bondfields ====
Party	Candidate	Votes	%	±%
Labour	W. Wheeler	2,515	68.5	
Residents	J. Starling	1,155	31.5	
Majority		1360	37.1	
Turnout		3670	30.8	
Labour win (new seat)				

==== Bedhampton and St. Faiths W ====
Party	Candidate	Votes	%	±%
Conservative	G. Concannon	2,301	46.8	
Liberal	R. Corbett	1,586	32.2	
Labour	W. Stillwell	953	19.4	
National Front	D. Vine	78	1.6	
Majority		715	14.5	
Turnout		4918	46.3	
Conservative win (new seat)				

==== Cowplain and Hart Plain ====
Party	Candidate	Votes	%	±%
Conservative	S. Hewitt	2,241	49.8	
Liberal	D. Crichton	1,567	34.9	
Labour	J. Gordon	688	15.3	
Majority		674	15.0	
Turnout		4486	33.9	
Conservative win (new seat)				

==== Emsworth and St Faiths East ====
Party	Candidate	Votes	%	±%
Conservative	H. Berridge	2,351	59.0	
Liberal	J. Cosslett	1,149	28.9	
Labour	D. Stevenson	482	12.1	
Majority		1202	30.2	
Turnout		3982	39.9	
Conservative win (new seat)				

==== Hayling Islands ====
Party	Candidate	Votes	%	±%
Conservative	E. Dossetter	2,458	54.2	
Liberal	S. Brewin	1,780	39.3	
Labour	F. Haynes	297	6.5	
Majority		678	15.0	
Turnout		4535	41.2	
Conservative win (new seat)				

==== Purbrook and Stakes South ====
Party	Candidate	Votes	%	±%
Conservative	R. Macdowell	1,901	61.3	
Labour	F. Cotter	1,201	38.7	
Majority		700	22.6	
Turnout		3102	25.8	
Conservative win (new seat)				

==== Waterloo and Stakes North ====
Party	Candidate	Votes	%	±%
Conservative	J. Reynolds	1,348	69.2	
Labour	I. Matthews	601	30.8	
Majority		747	38.3	
Turnout		1949	28.9	
Conservative win (new seat)				

=== New Forest ===
==== Brockenhurst ====
Party	Candidate	Votes	%	±%
Conservative	M. Howlett	2,265	61.7	
Independent	D. Luke	903	24.6	
Labour	A. Jackson	502	13.7	
Majority		1362	37.1	
Turnout		3670	38.2	
Conservative win (new seat)				

==== Dibden and Hythe ====
Party	Candidate	Votes	%	±%
Conservative	T. Thornber	2,521	46.0	
Liberal	W. Marshall	1,870	34.1	
Labour	R. Bates	1,091	19.9	
Majority		651	11.9	
Turnout		5482	40.0	
Conservative win (new seat)				

==== Fawley ====
Party	Candidate	Votes	%	±%
Liberal	J. Maynard	1,541	43.1	
Conservative	L. Gatrell	1,313	36.7	
Labour	M. Perkins	722	20.2	
Majority		228	6.4	
Turnout		3576	37.5	
Liberal win (new seat)				

==== FordingBridge ====
Party	Candidate	Votes	%	±%
Conservative	A. Lecky	2,128	56.6	
Liberal	E. Poland	1,242	33.0	
Labour	B. Blake	388	10.3	
Majority		886	23.6	
Turnout		3758	45.0	
Conservative win (new seat)				

==== Lymington ====
Party	Candidate	Votes	%	±%
Conservative	L. Hope-Jones	2,300	57.9	
Liberal	F. Harrison	940	23.7	
Labour	C. Bullingham	734	18.5	
Majority		1360	39.8	
Turnout		3974	34.2	
Conservative win (new seat)				

==== Lyndhurst ====
Party	Candidate	Votes	%	±%
Conservative	N. Pascoe	1,753	63.1	
Liberal	R. Good	726	26.1	
Labour	J. Simmonds	298	10.7	
Majority		1027	37.0	
Turnout		2777	37.4	
Conservative win (new seat)				

==== Milford and Hordle ====
Party	Candidate	Votes	%	±%
Conservative	A. Rice	3,175	69.0	
Liberal	J. Lazeri	1,427	31.0	
Majority		1748	38.0	
Turnout		4602	39.7	
Conservative win (new seat)				

==== New Milton ====
Party	Candidate	Votes	%	±%
Conservative	R. Alderson	2,802	69.9	
Liberal	G. Thompson	798	19.9	
Labour	D. James	408	10.2	
Majority		2104	50.0	
Turnout		4008	37.6	
Conservative win (new seat)				

==== Ringwood ====
Party	Candidate	Votes	%	±%
Conservative	L. Errington	2,639	54.1	
Liberal	S. O'Sullivan	1,266	26.0	
Labour	M. Shutler	971	19.9	
Majority		1373	28.2	
Turnout		4876	38.5	
Conservative win (new seat)				

==== Totton North ====
Party	Candidate	Votes	%	±%
Conservative	D. Burdle	2,066	49.3	
Liberal	M. Knill	1,129	26.9	
Labour	C. Yates	998	23.8	
Majority		937	22.3	
Turnout		4193	39.6	
Conservative win (new seat)				

==== Totton South ====
Party	Candidate	Votes	%	±%
Conservative	E. Randall	1,422	38.3	
Labour	L. Lewis	920	24.8	
Liberal	A. Hayes	747	20.1	
Residents	M. Banister	527	14.2	
Rate Reform	R. Taylor	100	2.7	
Majority		502	13.5	
Turnout		3716	41.3	
Conservative win (new seat)				

=== Portsmouth ===
==== Charles Dickens ====
Party	Candidate	Votes	%	±%
Labour	P. Chandler	2,386	73.8	
Conservative	T. Elmes	525	16.2	
Liberal	E. Oldfield	243	7.5	
National Front	G. Knight	78	2.4	
Majority		1861	57.6	
Turnout		3232	31.8	
Labour win (new seat)				

==== Copnor ====
Party	Candidate	Votes	%	±%
Conservative	A. Hill	2,071	44.3	
Labour	M. Western	1,697	36.3	
Liberal	V. Guantlett	907	19.4	
Majority		374	8.0	
Turnout		4675	42.6	
Conservative win (new seat)				

==== Cosham ====
Party	Candidate	Votes	%	±%
Labour	T. Wimbleton	1,787	48.8	
Conservative	K. Brown	1,639	44.8	
DVE	A. Brooks	234	6.4	
Majority		148	4.0	
Turnout		3650	34.5	
Labour win (new seat)				

==== Drayton and Farlington ====
Party	Candidate	Votes	%	±%
Conservative	S. Juniper	3,108	65.2	
Labour	P. Wimbleton	908	19.0	
Liberal	R. Somerville	754	15.8	
Majority		2200	46.1	
Turnout		4770	45.6	
Conservative win (new seat)				

==== Fratton ====
Party	Candidate	Votes	%	±%
Labour	M. Hancock	2,463	65.1	
Conservative	M. Seaman	852	22.5	
Liberal	T. Selby	466	12.3	
Majority		1611	42.6	
Turnout		3781	36.0	
Labour win (new seat)				

==== Havelock ====
Party	Candidate	Votes	%	±%
Labour	A. Golds	1,955	42.3	
Conservative	A. Ridgers	1,811	39.2	
Liberal	P. Durham	858	18.6	
Majority		144	3.1	
Turnout		4524	41.9	
Labour win (new seat)				

==== Highland ====
Party	Candidate	Votes	%	±%
Conservative	R. Taylor	1,634	38.5	
Labour	J. Wearn	1,400	32.9	
Liberal	A. Bentley	1,215	28.6	
Majority		234	5.5	
Turnout		4249	41.3	
Conservative win (new seat)				

==== Hilsea ====
Party	Candidate	Votes	%	±%
Conservative	K. Hale	2,079	49.8	
Labour	J. Dukes	1,399	33.5	
Liberal	W. Patterson	697	16.7	
Majority		680	16.3	
Turnout		4175	38.1	
Conservative win (new seat)				

==== Milton ====
Party	Candidate	Votes	%	±%
Labour	T. King	2,331	46.5	
Conservative	F. Nicholson	1,897	37.8	
Liberal	H. Faulkner	787	15.7	
Majority		434	8.7	
Turnout		5015	46.2	
Labour win (new seat)				

==== Nelson ====
Party	Candidate	Votes	%	±%
Labour	A. Woodsford	2,505	54.9	
Conservative	M. Prince	1,581	34.7	
Liberal	M Butt	476	10.4	
Majority		924	20.3	
Turnout		4562	39.4	
Labour win (new seat)				

==== Paulsgrove ====
Party	Candidate	Votes	%	±%
Labour	J. Attrill	2,454	70.5	
Conservative	K. Draycott	594	17.1	
Liberal	A. Peaston	434	12.5	
Majority		1860	53.4	
Turnout		3482	33.8	
Labour win (new seat)				

==== St Jude ====
Party	Candidate	Votes	%	±%
Conservative	P. Loe	1,719	56.0	
Liberal	A. Guy	690	22.5	
Labour	P. Murray	662	21.6	
Majority		1029	33.5	
Turnout		3071	32.3	
Conservative win (new seat)				

==== St Thomas ====
Party	Candidate	Votes	%	±%
Conservative	F. Emery-Wallis	1,819	41.1	
Labour	D. Ingham	1,466	33.1	
Liberal	J. Wallis	911	20.6	
Independent Labour	F. Guy	163	3.7	
National Front	R. Hadlow	65	1.5	
Majority		353	8.0	
Turnout		4424	39.0	
Conservative win (new seat)				

=== Rushmoor ===
==== Aldershot North ====
Party	Candidate	Votes	%	±%
Labour	R. Moore	1,376	37.9	
Liberal	T. Coe	1,171	32.2	
Conservative	R. Kimber	1,086	29.9	
Majority		205	5.6	
Turnout		3633	37.7	
Labour win (new seat)				

==== Aldershot South ====
Party	Candidate	Votes	%	±%
Labour	M. Roberts	2,289	53.1	
Conservative	C. Balchin	2,023	46.9	
Majority		266	6.2	
Turnout		4312	41.8	
Labour win (new seat)				

==== Farnborough North ====
Party	Candidate	Votes	%	±%
Labour	A. Crawford	2,868	62.8	
Conservative	A. Callan	1,695	37.2	
Majority		1173	25.7	
Turnout		4563	47.0	
Labour win (new seat)				

==== Farnborough South ====
Party	Candidate	Votes	%	±%
Conservative	B. Wade	2,089	53.5	
Liberal	D. Simpson	1,240	31.8	
Labour	A. Willats	575	14.7	
Majority		849	21.7	
Turnout		3904	37.5	
Conservative win (new seat)				

==== Farnborough West ====
Party	Candidate	Votes	%	±%
Conservative	A. Bolt	1,546	38.2	
Labour	J. Burns	1,348	33.3	
Liberal	K. Brown	1,150	28.4	
Majority		198	4.9	
Turnout		4054	40.2	
Conservative win (new seat)				

=== Southampton ===
==== Bargate ====
Party	Candidate	Votes	%	±%
Labour	J. Noon	2,203	65.2	
Conservative	C. Powell	747	22.1	
Liberal	R. Fitzgerald	427	12.6	
Majority		1456	43.1	
Turnout		3377	38.2	
Labour win (new seat)				

==== Bassett ====
Party	Candidate	Votes	%	±%
Conservative	N. Best	2,412	52.3	
Labour	A. Scriven	1,384	30.0	
Liberal	D. Maddock	814	17.7	
Majority		1028	22.3	
Turnout		4610	38.1	
Conservative win (new seat)				

==== Bitterne ====
Party	Candidate	Votes	%	±%
Labour	J. Denham	2,120	57.5	
Conservative	E. Brown	1,128	30.6	
Liberal	S. Yolland	440	11.9	
Majority		992	26.9	
Turnout		3688	36.1	
Labour win (new seat)				

==== Bitterne Park ====
Party	Candidate	Votes	%	±%
Labour	J. Pimlott	2,040	43.7	
Conservative	D. Saunders	1,849	39.6	
Liberal	D. Everett	779	16.7	
Majority		191	4.1	
Turnout		4668	40.6	
Labour win (new seat)				

==== Coxford ====
Party	Candidate	Votes	%	±%
Labour	B. Roost	2,445	59.1	
Conservative	A. Samuels	1,099	26.6	
Liberal	G. Gill	594	14.4	
Majority		1346	32.5	
Turnout		4138	36.7	
Labour win (new seat)				

==== Freemantle ====
Party	Candidate	Votes	%	±%
Conservative	M. Andrews	1,561	40.2	
Labour	M. Knight	1,491	38.4	
Liberal	M. Gausden	833	21.4	
Majority		70	1.8	
Turnout		3885	39.6	
Conservative win (new seat)				

==== Harefield ====
Party	Candidate	Votes	%	±%
Conservative	A. Zinn	1,760	35.8	
Labour	P. Hopwood	1,727	35.1	
Liberal	P. Brixley	1,430	29.1	
Majority		33	0.7	
Turnout		4917	45.6	
Conservative win (new seat)				

==== Millbrook ====
Party	Candidate	Votes	%	±%
Labour	P. Bahia	1,524	35.0	
Conservative	D. Freeston	1,449	33.3	
Liberal	P. Gurd	1,383	31.7	
Majority		75	1.7	
Turnout		4356	41.1	
Labour win (new seat)				

==== Peartree ====
Party	Candidate	Votes	%	±%
Labour	A. Rees	2,255	53.4	
Conservative	D. Brown	1,401	33.2	
Liberal	C. Massey	567	13.4	
Majority		854	20.2	
Turnout		4223	39.3	
Labour win (new seat)				

==== Portswood ====
Party	Candidate	Votes	%	±%
Labour	J. Ashton	1,740	40.7	
Conservative	E. Lewis	1,558	36.5	
Liberal	R. Allanach	975	22.8	
Majority		182	4.3	
Turnout		4273	42.2	
Labour win (new seat)				

==== Redbridge ====
Party	Candidate	Votes	%	±%
Labour	G. Ranger	3,168	75.0	
Conservative	B. Parnell	1,055	25.0	
Majority		2113	50.0	
Turnout		4223	38.4	
Labour win (new seat)				

==== Shirley ====
Party	Candidate	Votes	%	±%
Conservative	E. Ashcroft	2,454	59.5	
Labour	B. Cropping	1,668	40.5	
Majority		786	19.1	
Turnout		4122	39.2	
Conservative win (new seat)				

==== Sholing ====
Party	Candidate	Votes	%	±%
Labour	I. Candy	2,606	55.1	
Conservative	W. Hedges	1,492	31.6	
Liberal	J. Hatch	630	13.3	
Majority		1114	23.6	
Turnout		4728	40.5	
Labour win (new seat)				

==== St Lukes ====
Party	Candidate	Votes	%	±%
Labour	J. Ellis	1,728	47.0	
Conservative	P. Lankford	1,513	41.2	
Liberal	D. Foxley	435	11.8	
Majority		215	5.8	
Turnout		3676	39.5	
Labour win (new seat)				

==== Woolston ====
Party	Candidate	Votes	%	±%
Labour	W. Cowper	2,457	57.2	
Conservative	I. Hayward	1,244	29.0	
Liberal	J. Rice	593	13.8	
Majority		1213	28.2	
Turnout		4294	39.1	
Labour win (new seat)				

=== Test Valley ===
==== Andover North ====
Party	Candidate	Votes	%	±%
Labour	S. Stephenson	1,642	38.3	
Liberal	B. People	1,292	30.1	
Conservative	T. Maloney	1,257	29.3	
DVE	T. Sharpe	98	2.2	
Majority		350	8.2	
Turnout		4289	40.3	
Labour win (new seat)				

==== Andover Rural ====
Party	Candidate	Votes	%	±%
Conservative	W. A'Beckett-Tyrrell	2,759	56.2	
Liberal	W. Furness	1,161	23.7	
Labour	M. Davis	793	16.2	
DVE	S. Harrington-Elsmore	793	16.2	
Majority		1598	32.6	
Turnout		4713	42.2	
Conservative win (new seat)				

==== Andover South ====
Party	Candidate	Votes	%	±%
Independent	F. Sumner	1,786	31.6	
Conservative	G. Porter	1,640	29.0	
Liberal	N. Lewis	1,622	28.7	
Labour	A. Holloway	608	10.7	
Majority		146	2.6	
Turnout		5656	47.5	
Independent win (new seat)				

==== Baddesley ====
Party	Candidate	Votes	%	±%
Conservative	P. Merridale	2,242	54.7	
Liberal	G. Bartlett	1,067	26.0	
Labour	G. Ludlow	791	19.3	
Majority		1175	28.7	
Turnout		4100	41.7	
Conservative win (new seat)				

==== Romsey ====
Party	Candidate	Votes	%	±%
Conservative	J. Rowsell	2,243	47.3	
Labour	C. Mead	1,672	35.3	
Liberal	M. Holden-Bull	826	17.4	
Majority		571	12.0	
Turnout		4741	41.4	
Conservative win (new seat)				

==== Stockbridge and Wellow ====
Party	Candidate	Votes	%	±%
Conservative	C. Jones	2,385	61.5	
Liberal	A. Hicks	693	17.9	
Labour	R. Lysons	600	15.5	
DVE	S. Tidy	198	5.1	
Majority		1692	43.7	
Turnout		4876	36.4	
Conservative win (new seat)				

=== Winchester ===
==== Bishops Waltham ====
Party	Candidate	Votes	%	±%
Conservative	T. Steele	2,586	53.9	
Liberal	K. Bonnar	1,608	33.5	
Labour	P. Flowers	602	12.6	
Majority		978	20.4	
Turnout		4796	41.2	
Conservative win (new seat)				

==== Downlands ====
Party	Candidate	Votes	%	±%
Conservative	C. Wilson	2,918	73.8	
Labour	W. Allchin	1,036	26.2	
Majority		1882	47.6	
Turnout		3954	40.7	
Conservative win (new seat)				

==== Eastgate ====
Party	Candidate	Votes	%	±%
Conservative	J. Darling	2,228	40.6	
Labour	J. Cloyne	2,199	40.1	
Liberal	A. Hunter	920	16.8	
DVE	A. Holdstock	141	2.6	
Majority		29	0.5	
Turnout		5488	47.2	
Conservative win (new seat)				

==== Itchen Valley ====
Party	Candidate	Votes	%	±%
Conservative	A. Dowling	2,235	50.7	
Liberal	M. Ashby	1,496	34.0	
Labour	B. Williams	673	15.3	
Majority		739	16.8	
Turnout		4404	41.4	
Conservative win (new seat)				

==== Meon Valley ====
Party	Candidate	Votes	%	±%
Conservative	R. Whitmore	2,840	56.2	
Liberal	P. Howe	1,649	32.6	
Labour	W. Organ	566	11.2	
Majority		1191	23.6	
Turnout		5055	38.9	
Conservative win (new seat)				

==== Westgate ====
Party	Candidate	Votes	%	±%
Conservative	T. Watson	2,509	45.9	
Labour	P. Davies	1,650	30.2	
Liberal	J. Beveridge	1,192	21.8	
DVE	A. Ward	119	2.2	
Majority		859	15.7	
Turnout		5470	45.7	
Conservative win (new seat)				
