= R v District Auditor No 3 Audit District of West Yorkshire MCC, ex p West Yorkshire MCC =

R v District Auditor No 3 Audit District of West Yorkshire MCC, ex parte West Yorkshire MCC
- Full case name: R v District Auditor No 3 Audit District of West Yorkshire Metropolitan City Council, ex parte West Yorkshire Metropolitan City Council
- Citation: [1986] RVR 24

Keywords
- Certainty, express trusts

R v District Auditor No 3 Audit District of West Yorkshire MCC, ex parte West Yorkshire MCC [1986] RVR 24 is an English trusts law case, concerning the certainty of trusts, and their administrative workability.

== Facts ==
West Yorkshire Metropolitan County Council wished to create a discretionary trust of £400,000 to be applied for a list of purposes ‘for the benefit of any or all or some of the inhabitants of the county of West Yorkshire.'

== Judgment ==
Taylor J held that the trust was invalid, because it was administratively unworkable to distribute such small amounts to all people. The trust was not, however, ‘capricious’, but merely too difficult and costly for a court to enforce.

A trust with as many as 2 ½ million potential beneficiaries is, in my judgment, quite simply unworkable. The class is far too large... ... It seems to me that the present trust comes within the third case to which Lord Wilberforce refers. I hope I am not guilty of being prejudiced by the example which he gave. But it could hardly be more apt, or fit the facts of the present case more precisely.

== See also ==
- English trusts law
