= 1981 United Kingdom local elections =

- 7 May 1981 (England & Wales); 20 May 1981 (Northern Ireland)

1 Unicameral area, all 6 metropolitan counties, all 39 non-metropolitan counties, 1 sui generis authority, all 26 Northern Irish districts and all 8 Welsh counties
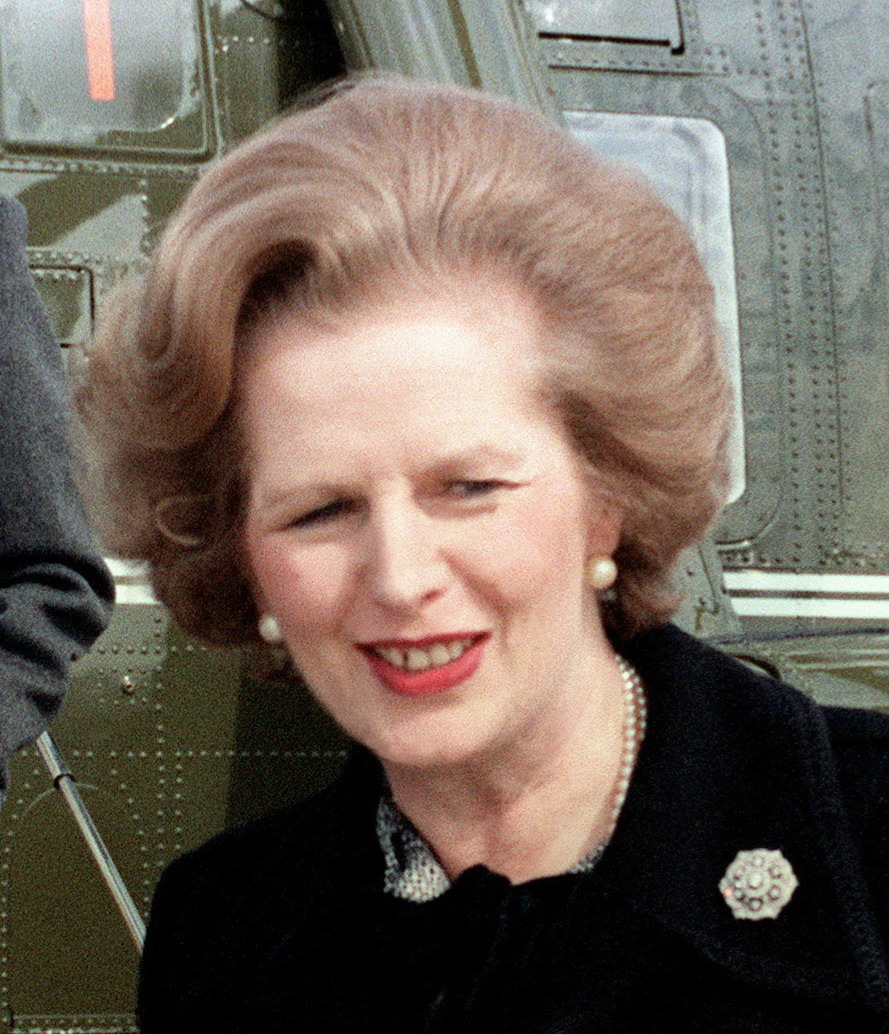

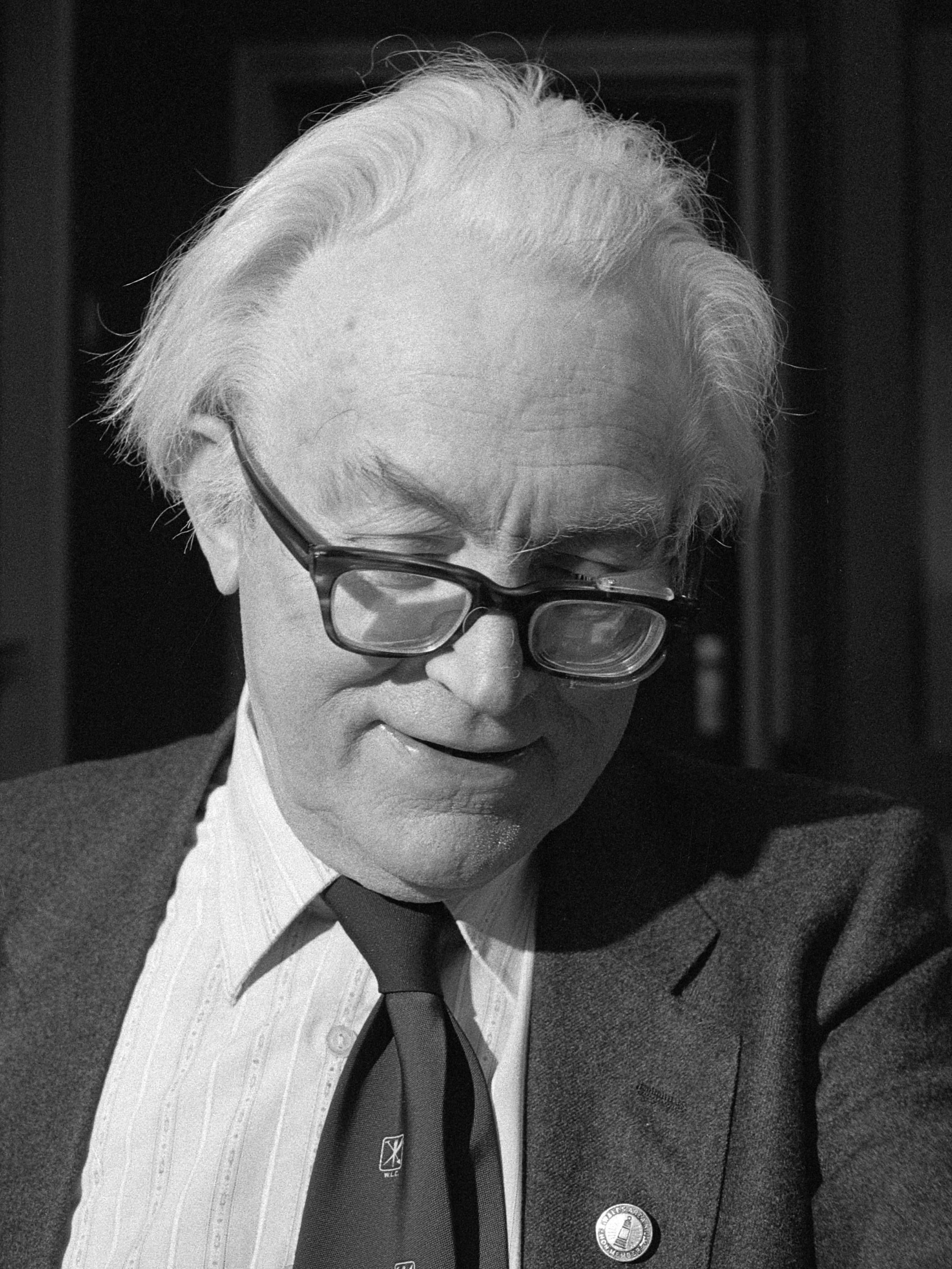

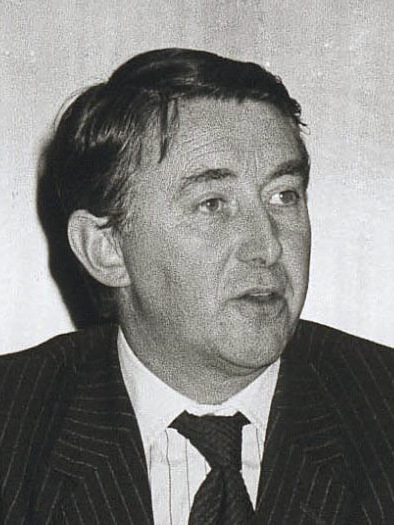
	Majority party	Minority party	Third party
Leader	Margaret Thatcher	Michael Foot	David Steel
Party	Conservative	Labour	Liberal
Leader since	11 February 1975	10 November 1980	7 July 1976
Percentage	38%	41%	17%
Councillors	10,545	8,999	1,455
Councillors +/-	▼1,193	▲988	▲306
- Colours denote the winning party, as shown in the main table of results.

Local elections were held in the United Kingdom in May 1981.

== Results ==
The results were a mid-term setback for the Conservative government, which lost 1,193 seats, leaving them with 10,545 councillors. The projected share of the vote was more respectable for the government, however: Labour 41%, Conservatives 38%, Liberals 17%. This was in spite of opinion polls showing a much wider Labour lead over the Conservatives. These were the first elections to be contested by Labour under the leadership of Michael Foot, who had succeeded James Callaghan in late 1980.

Elections took place for the county councils and the Greater London Council, which elected 50 Labour councillors, 41 Conservatives and 1 Liberal.

In terms of the county councils, changes in party control were as follows;

Labour gain from Conservative: Cumbria, Derbyshire, Lancashire, Nottinghamshire, Staffordshire

Labour gain from no overall control: Northumberland

Conservative lose to no overall control: Bedfordshire, Gloucestershire, Leicestershire, Northamptonshire, Warwickshire

Liberal gain from Conservative: Isle of Wight

Labour gained 988 overall seats, bringing their number of councillors to 8,999. This was the first electoral test for Labour leader Michael Foot, who had become Labour leader in November 1980.

The Liberal Party gained 306 seats and finished with 1,455 councillors. The 1981 local elections were to be the last to be held before the Liberals formed an alliance with the new Social Democratic Party (SDP) in June 1981.

== England ==
=== Unicameral area ===
This was the last election to the council before it was abolished by the Local Government Act 1985.

Council	Previous control	Result	Details
Greater London	Conservative	Labour gain	Details

=== Metropolitan county councils ===
These were the last elections to the county councils before they were abolished by the Local Government Act 1985.

Council	Previous control	Result	Details
Greater Manchester	Conservative	Labour gain	Details
Merseyside	Conservative	Labour gain	Details
South Yorkshire	Labour	Labour hold	Details
Tyne and Wear	Labour	Labour hold	Details
West Midlands	Conservative	Labour gain	Details
West Yorkshire	Conservative	Labour gain	Details

=== Non-metropolitan county councils ===
Council	Previous control	Result	Details
Avon ‡	Conservative	Labour gain	Details
Bedfordshire	Conservative	No overall control gain	Details
Berkshire	Conservative	No overall control gain	Details
Buckinghamshire	Conservative	Conservative hold	Details
Cambridgeshire	Conservative	Conservative hold	Details
Cheshire ‡	No overall control	No overall control hold	Details
Cleveland	Conservative	Labour gain	Details
Cornwall	Independent	Independent hold	Details
Cumbria ‡	Conservative	Labour gain	Details
Derbyshire ‡	Conservative	Labour gain	Details
Devon	Conservative	Conservative hold	Details
Dorset	Conservative	Conservative hold	Details
Durham ‡	Labour	Labour hold	Details
East Sussex	Conservative	Conservative hold	Details
Essex ‡	Conservative	Conservative hold	Details
Gloucestershire	Conservative	No overall control gain	Details
Hampshire ‡	Conservative	Conservative hold	Details
Hereford and Worcester	Conservative	Conservative hold	Details
Hertfordshire ‡	Conservative	Conservative hold	Details
Humberside ‡	Conservative	Labour gain	Details
Isle of Wight ‡	Conservative	Liberal gain	Details
Kent ‡	Conservative	Conservative hold	Details
Lancashire ‡	Conservative	Labour gain	Details
Leicestershire	Conservative	No overall control gain	Details
Lincolnshire ‡	Conservative	Conservative hold	Details
Norfolk	Conservative	Conservative hold	Details
North Yorkshire	Conservative	Conservative hold	Details
Northamptonshire ‡	Conservative	No overall control gain	Details
Northumberland ‡	No overall control	Labour gain	Details
Nottinghamshire ‡	Conservative	Labour gain	Details
Oxfordshire	Conservative	Conservative hold	Details
Shropshire ‡	No overall control	No overall control hold	Details
Somerset ‡	Conservative	Conservative hold	Details
Staffordshire ‡	Conservative	Labour gain	Details
Suffolk	Conservative	Conservative hold	Details
Surrey ‡	Conservative	Conservative hold	Details
Warwickshire ‡	Conservative	No overall control gain	Details
West Sussex	Conservative	Conservative hold	Details
Wiltshire ‡	Conservative	Conservative hold	Details

‡ New electoral division boundaries

=== Sui generis ===
Council	Previous control	Result	Details
Isles of Scilly			Details

== Northern Ireland ==
Map of the largest party by council area.

Council	Previous control	Result	Details
Antrim	UUP	No overall control	Details
Ards	No overall control	No overall control	Details
Armagh	No overall control	No overall control	Details
Ballymena	DUP	DUP	Details
Ballymoney	No overall control	No overall control	Details
Banbridge	UUP	UUP	Details
Belfast	No overall control	No overall control	Details
Carrickfergus	No overall control	No overall control	Details
Castlereagh	No overall control	No overall control	Details
Coleraine	UUP	No overall control	Details
Cookstown	No overall control	No overall control	Details
Craigavon	No overall control	No overall control	Details
Down	SDLP	No overall control	Details
Dungannon	No overall control	No overall control	Details
Fermanagh	No overall control	No overall control	Details
Larne	No overall control	No overall control	Details
Limavady	No overall control	No overall control	Details
Lisburn	No overall control	No overall control	Details
Londonderry	No overall control	SDLP	Details
Magherafelt	No overall control	No overall control	Details
Moyle	No overall control	No overall control	Details
Newry and Mourne	SDLP	SDLP	Details
Newtownabbey	No overall control	No overall control	Details
North Down	No overall control	No overall control	Details
Omagh	No overall control	No overall control	Details
Strabane	No overall control	No overall control	Details

== Wales ==
=== County councils ===
Council	Previous control	Result	Details
Clwyd	No overall control	No overall control hold	Details
Dyfed	Independent	No overall control gain	Details
Gwent	No overall control	Labour gain	Details
Gwynedd	Independent	Independent hold	Details
Mid Glamorgan	Labour	Labour hold	Details
Powys	Independent	Independent hold	Details
South Glamorgan	Conservative	Labour gain	Details
West Glamorgan	Labour	Labour hold	Details
