= Moyle Area A =

District electoral areas in Moyle, Northern Ireland

Moyle Area A was one of the three district electoral areas in Moyle, Northern Ireland which existed from 1973 to 1985. The district elected four members to Moyle District Council, and formed part of the North Antrim constituencies for the Northern Ireland Assembly and UK Parliament.

It was created for the 1973 local elections, and contained the wards of Glenaan, Glenariff, Glendun and Glenshesk. It was abolished for the 1985 local elections and replaced by The Glens DEA.

== Councillors ==
| Election | Councillor (Party) | Councillor (Party) | Councillor (Party) | Councillor (Party) |
|---|---|---|---|---|
| 1981 | Fergus Wheeler (Independent) | Malachy McSparran (SDLP) | Gerard Gillan (SDLP) | Archie McIntosh (SDLP) |
| 1977 | Fergus Wheeler (Independent) | Alistair McSparran (Independent) | Patrick McCarry (Independent) | Archie McIntosh (SDLP) |
| 1973 | Fergus Wheeler (Independent) | Alistair McSparran (Independent) | Patrick McCarry (Independent) | Arthur McAlister (Independent) |

== 1981 Election ==
1977: 3 x Independent, 1 x SDLP

1981: 3 x SDLP, 1 x Independent

1977-1981 Change: SDLP (two seats) gain from Independent (two seats)

Moyle Area A - 4 seats
| Party | Candidate | FPv% | Count | | | | | |
| Party | Candidate | FPv% | 1 | 2 | 3 | 4 | 5 | 6 |
|---|---|---|---|---|---|---|---|---|
| SDLP | Malachy McSparran | 22.12% | 477 | | | | | |
| Independent | Fergus Wheeler* | 21.38% | 461 | | | | | |
| SDLP | Archie McIntosh* | 11.50% | 248 | 264.8 | 275.24 | 282.24 | 298.2 | 434.3 |
| SDLP | Gerard Gillan | 12.15% | 262 | 266.6 | 266.84 | 278.84 | 380.8 | 408.34 |
| Irish Independence | John McKay | 11.18% | 241 | 249.1 | 255.58 | 277.8 | 303.64 | 353.7 |
| SDLP | Charles Hamill | 10.20% | 220 | 229.5 | 234.06 | 238.06 | 241.18 | |
| Independent | Thomas O'Neill | 4.45% | 96 | 99.6 | 102.06 | 115.12 | | |
| Independent | Gerard McCarry | 3.85% | 83 | 84.2 | 84.92 | 92.08 | | |
| Irish Independence | Anna Edwards | 3.15% | 68 | 68.2 | 68.44 | | | |
Electorate: 2,776 Valid: 2,156 (77.67%) Spoilt: 46 Quota: 432 Turnout: 2,202 (79.32%)

== 1977 Election ==
1973: 4 x Independent

1977: 3 x Independent, 1 x SDLP

1973-1977 Change: SDLP gain from Independent

Moyle Area A - 4 seats
| Party | Candidate | FPv% | Count | | | |
| Party | Candidate | FPv% | 1 | 2 | 3 | 4 |
|---|---|---|---|---|---|---|
| Independent | Fergus Wheeler* | 20.03% | 406 | | | |
| Independent | Alistair McSparran* | 19.44% | 394 | 559 | | |
| Independent | Patrick McCarry* | 17.96% | 364 | 379 | 430 | |
| SDLP | Archie McIntosh | 16.08% | 326 | 352 | 386 | 397.44 |
| SDLP | John McKay | 14.31% | 290 | 328 | 373 | 385.32 |
| Independent | Arthur McAlister* | 12.19% | 247 | | | |
Electorate: 2,716 Valid: 2,027 (74.63%) Spoilt: 56 Quota: 406 Turnout: 2,083 (76.69%)

== 1973 Election ==
1973: 4 x Independent

Moyle Area A - 4 seats
| Party | Candidate | FPv% | Count | | | | | | | |
| Party | Candidate | FPv% | 1 | 2 | 3 | 4 | 5 | 6 | 7 | 8 |
|---|---|---|---|---|---|---|---|---|---|---|
| Independent | Alistair McSparran | 23.87% | 533 | | | | | | | |
| Independent | Fergus Wheeler | 21.67% | 484 | | | | | | | |
| Independent | Patrick McCarry | 15.94% | 356 | 360.32 | 361.84 | 379.08 | 388.64 | 493.64 | | |
| Independent | Arthur McAlister | 8.82% | 197 | 238.44 | 249.24 | 268.1 | 329.6 | 353.04 | 372.29 | 458.29 |
| Independent | P. McCambridge | 8.82% | 149 | 163.56 | 175.88 | 188.68 | 214.48 | 227 | 245.48 | ???? |
| Independent | P. P. Delargy | 8.33% | 186 | 192.24 | 196.48 | 210.44 | 224.4 | 233.04 | 241.51 | |
| Independent | J. McCaughan | 5.69% | 127 | 129.08 | 130.2 | 159.76 | 161.89 | | | |
| SDLP | Joseph Lynn | 4.61% | 103 | 114.68 | 118.36 | 125.92 | | | | |
| Alliance | W. Grace | 2.24% | 50 | 51.92 | 52.32 | | | | | |
| Independent | D. McAlister | 2.15% | 48 | 49.12 | 50.32 | | | | | |
Electorate: 2,644 Valid: 2,233 (84.46%) Spoilt: 15 Quota: 447 Turnout: 2,248 (85.02%)

- Data missing from McCambridge's vote in stage 8, because the count was not continued after McAlister was elected over the quota for the final seat.
