= 1981 Suffolk County Council election =

1981 UK local government election

- 7 May 1981

All 82 seats to Suffolk County Council 42 seats needed for a majority

	First party	Second party
Party	Conservative	Labour
Seats won	49	31
Seat change	▼21	▲22
Popular vote	88,115	78,895
Percentage	46.5%	41.6%
Swing	▼15.5%	▲10.0%
	Third party	Fourth party
Party	Independent	Liberal
Seats won	2	0
Seat change	Steady	▼1
Popular vote	5,283	13,114
Percentage	2.8%	6.9%
Swing	▼1.5%	▲5.5%
Council control before election
Conservative
Council control after election
Conservative

The 1981 Suffolk County Council election took place on 7 May 1981 to elect members of Suffolk County Council in Suffolk, England. It was held on the same day as other local elections.

== Summary ==
=== Election result ===
1981 Suffolk County Council election
Party	Candidates	Seats	Gains	Losses	Net gain/loss	Seats %	Votes %	Votes	+/−
Conservative	77	49			▼21	59.8	46.5	88,115	–15.5
Labour	77	31			▲22	37.8	41.6	78,895	+10.0
Independent	9	2			Steady	2.4	2.8	5,283	–1.5
Liberal	19	0			▼1	0.0	6.9	13,114	+5.5
Ecology	12	0			Steady	0.0	1.4	2,722	N/A
Independent Liberal	1	0			Steady	0.0	0.4	821	N/A
Independent Social Democrat	1	0			Steady	0.0	0.3	543	N/A
