= Moyle Area C =

District electoral areas in Moyle, Northern Ireland

Moyle Area C was one of the three district electoral areas in Moyle, Northern Ireland which existed from 1973 to 1985. The district elected four members to Moyle District Council, and formed part of the North Antrim constituencies for the Northern Ireland Assembly and UK Parliament.

It was created for the 1973 local elections, and contained the wards of Dalraida, Knocklayd, Quay and Rathlin. It was abolished for the 1985 local elections and replaced by the Ballycastle DEA.

== Councillors ==
Election	Councillor (Party)	Councillor (Party)	Councillor (Party)	Councillor (Party)
1981	Elizabeth Johnston (UUP)	Richard Kerr (SDLP)	Michael O'Cleary (SDLP)	Archibald McAuley (Independent)
1977	Elizabeth Johnston (UUP)	John Black (SDLP)	John McAfee (SDLP)	Archibald McAuley (Independent)
1973	Elizabeth Johnston (UUP)	John Black (SDLP)	John McAfee (SDLP)	Archibald McAuley (Independent)

== 1981 Election ==
1977: 2 x SDLP, 1 x UUP, 1 x Independent

1981: 2 x SDLP, 1 x UUP, 1 x Independent

1977-1981 Change: No change

Moyle Area C - 4 seats
Party	Candidate	FPv%	Count					
Party	Candidate	FPv%	1	2	3	4	5	6
SDLP	Richard Kerr	18.51%	296	304	304	385		
SDLP	Michael O'Cleary	13.88%	222	229	229	272	324	
UUP	Elizabeth Johnston*	9.38%	150	156	246	249	249.8	354.8
Independent	Archibald McAuley*	14.82%	237	251	255	280	288.8	332.8
Irish Independence	Eamonn Scally	11.13%	178	184	184	196	198.4	198.4
Alliance	Hugh Sayers	8.69%	139	160	181	185	185.8	
SDLP	Joseph Donaghy	9.82%	157	170	170			
DUP	Norman Campbell	8.01%	128	132				
Alliance	Thomas Cecil	5.75%	92					
Electorate: 2,393 Valid: 1,599 (66.82%) Spoilt: 48 Quota: 320 Turnout: 1,647 (68.83%)

== 1977 Election ==
1973: 2 x SDLP, 1 x UUP, 1 x Independent

1977: 2 x SDLP, 1 x UUP, 1 x Independent

1973-1977 Change: No change

Moyle Area C - 5 seats
Party	Candidate	FPv%	Count			
Party	Candidate	FPv%	1	2	3	4
SDLP	John Black*	29.54%	418			
UUP	Elizabeth Johnston*	19.72%	279	283.48	287.48	
Independent	Archibald McAuley*	16.18%	229	255.88	266.48	334.48
SDLP	John McAfee*	14.13%	200	248.64	256.52	281.48
SDLP	Joseph Donaghy	8.20%	116	159.84	169.12	187.76
Alliance	John Scott	7.56%	107	108.28	147.92	
Alliance	Maurice McHenry	4.66%	66	73.36		
Electorate: 2,304 Valid: 1,415 (61.41%) Spoilt: 66 Quota: 284 Turnout: 1,481 (64.28%)

== 1973 Election ==
1973: 2 x SDLP, 1 x UUP, 1 x Independent

Moyle Area C - 5 seats
Party	Candidate	FPv%	Count						
Party	Candidate	FPv%	1	2	3	4	5	6	7
UUP	Elizabeth Johnston	20.07%	324						
SDLP	John Black	17.10%	276	281	302	336			
SDLP	John McAfee	10.90%	176	190	210	223	227	360	
Independent	Archibald McAuley	10.47%	169	176	186	194	243	286	311.85
Alliance	E. Molloy	9.60%	155	168	181	183	229	250	261
SDLP	C. Lynn	9.91%	160	165	173	202	208		
UUP	J. Greer	7.81%	126	140	142	146			
SDLP	F. Duncan	5.20%	84	89	91				
Ulster Liberal	J. B. Bakewell	4.77%	77	80					
Independent	A. J. Watt	4.15%	67						
Electorate: 2,185 Valid: 1,614 (73.87%) Spoilt: 19 Quota: 323 Turnout: 1,633 (74.74%)
