= Moyle Area B =

District electoral areas in Moyle, Northern Ireland

Moyle Area B was one of the three district electoral areas in Moyle, Northern Ireland which existed from 1973 to 1985. The district elected eight members to Moyle District Council, and formed part of the North Antrim constituencies for the Northern Ireland Assembly and UK Parliament.

It was created for the 1973 local elections, and contained the wards of Armoy, Ballintoy, Ballylough, Bushmills, Carnmoon, Dunservick, Kinbane and Moss-side. It was abolished for the 1985 local elections and replaced by the Giant's Causeway DEA.

== Councillors ==
Election	Councillor (Party)	Councillor (Party)	Councillor (Party)	Councillor (Party)	Councillor (Party)	Councillor (Party)	Councillor (Party)	Councillor (Party)
1981	James McShane (Independent)	James Rodgers (DUP)	Ronnie McIlvar (DUP)	Mary Morrison (Independent Unionist)/ (DUP)	Price McConaghy (Independent Unionist)/ (UUP)	Robert Getty (UUP)	Hugh Acheson (UUP)	James McAuley (UUP)
1977	James McShane (Independent)	Maureen Gaston (Independent)	George McFadden (DUP)	Mary Morrison (Independent Unionist)/ (DUP)	Price McConaghy (Independent Unionist)/ (UUP)	Robert McKay (UUP)	Matt Colgan (Independent Unionist)	Samuel Adams (Independent Unionist)
1973	James McShane (Independent)	James Gault (Independent)	W. Baxter (UUP)	S. Montgomery (UUP)	Price McConaghy (Independent Unionist)/ (UUP)	Robert McKay (UUP)	Hugh Acheson (Independent Unionist)	Samuel Adams (Independent Unionist)

== 1981 Election ==
1977: 2 x UUP, 2 x DUP, 2 x Independent Unionist, 2 x Independent

1981: 3 x UUP, 2 x DUP, 2 x Independent Unionist, 1 x Independent

1977-1981 Change: UUP gain from Independent

Moyle Area B - 8 seats
Party	Candidate	FPv%	Count									
Party	Candidate	FPv%	1	2	3	4	5	6	7	8	9	10
DUP	James Rodgers	15.44%	445									
Independent	James McShane*	11.97%	345									
Ind. Unionist	Price McConaghy*	13.22%	381									
Ind. Unionist	Mary Morrison*	10.41%	300	310.08	326.4							
UUP	Robert Getty	10.37%	299	299.84	313.1	313.1	316.44	325.44				
DUP	Ronnie McIlvar	8.43%	243	257.28	258.98	258.98	297.4	298.13	298.49	298.49	397.49	
UUP	Hugh Acheson	8.78%	253	254.12	261.6	263.6	267.77	271.45	273.25	275.14	291	305
UUP	James McAuley	6.70%	193	206.72	217.6	217.6	218.16	236.5	238.3	239.56	274.69	287.69
Alliance	Maurice McHenry	4.93%	142	142.56	143.75	164.35	164.35	222.72	222.81	223.44	226.09	227.09
DUP	Andrew Dobbin	4.61%	133	200.48	203.88	203.88	219.58	221.58	222.75	223.38		
Alliance	John Shanks	3.19%	92	94.52	97.58	98.68	99.68					
DUP	Samuel Simpson	1.94%	56	68.6	70.47	70.67						
Electorate: 4,438 Valid: 2,882 (64.94%) Spoilt: 73 Quota: 321 Turnout: 2,955 (66.58%)

== 1977 Election ==
1973: 4 x UUP, 2 x Independent Unionist, 2 x Independent

1977: 2 x UUP, 2 x DUP, 2 x Independent Unionist, 2 x Independent

1973-1977 Change: DUP (two seats) gain from UUP (two seats)

Moyle Area B - 8 seats
Party	Candidate	FPv%	Count								
Party	Candidate	FPv%	1	2	3	4	5	6	7	8	9
Independent	James McShane*	18.70%	472								
UUP	Price McConaghy*	16.64%	420								
Ind. Unionist	Matt Colgan	13.19%	333								
UUP	Robert McKay*	8.16%	206	210.8	271.66	291.82					
Ind. Unionist	Samuel Adams*	6.30%	159	170.4	180.26	182.5	183.5	200.42	303.42		
Independent	Maureen Gaston	4.08%	103	263	262.86	267.02	267.02	280.58	298.58		
DUP	Mary Morrison	8.95%	226	226.6	235.44	239.92	247.6	269.82	271.98	272.74	273.24
DUP	George McFadden	6.58%	166	168.4	169.76	171.52	215.52	221.9	228.24	235.84	237.84
Ind. Unionist	Lee Walker	5.74%	145	145.6	156.48	167.36	180.36	193.2	201.2	215.26	223.26
UUP	Hugh Acheson*	5.74%	145	157	160.06	161.18	161.18	166.38			
Unionist Party NI	William McConaghy	3.17%	80	89	119.6	124.24	126.24				
DUP	Ronnie McIlvar	2.73%	69	69	70.36	70.68					
Electorate: 4,511 Valid: 2,524 (55.95%) Spoilt: 65 Quota: 281 Turnout: 2,589 (57.39%)

== 1973 Election ==
1973: 4 x UUP, 2 x Independent Unionist, 2 x Independent

Moyle Area B - 8 seats
Party	Candidate	FPv%	Count						
Party	Candidate	FPv%	1	2	3	4	5	6	7
UUP	Robert McKay	18.96%	535						
UUP	Price McConaghy	12.66%	357						
Ind. Unionist	Samuel Adams	9.75%	275	299.6	306.56	331.56			
UUP	W. Baxter	9.22%	260	307.15	313.39	316.59			
Ind. Unionist	Hugh Acheson	7.55%	213	272.45	276.77	309.54	331.54		
Independent	James Gault	9.25%	261	283.55	292.31	313.9	330.9		
UUP	S. Montgomery	7.52%	212	254.23	263.71	283.65	327.65		
Independent	James McShane	8.83%	249	249.82	250.3	250.83	275.83	278.83	283.83
Independent	James McToal	8.26%	233	233	233	233	236.12	237.12	238.12
Alliance	R. Irwin	4.57%	129	137.2	138.52	143.28			
DUP	R. W. Taggart	3.44%	97	110.12	113.96				
Electorate: 4,655 Valid: 2,821 (60.60%) Spoilt: 28 Quota: 314 Turnout: 2,849 (61.20%)
