= 1973 West Yorkshire County Council election =

1973 county council election in England

Elections for West Yorkshire County Council were held in April 1973, which resulted in a Labour lead for the new Metropolitan Council.

Council	Conservative	Labour	Liberal	Independent	Other	Control
West Yorkshire	25	51	11	1	0	Labour

One month later, in May 1973, Metropolitan District Council elections were held for Bradford, Leeds, Halifax, Huddersfield and Wakefield. The county council was abolished thirteen years later in 1986.
