= 1981 Hertfordshire County Council election =

1981 English local election

← 1977	7 May 1981	1985 →

All 77 seats to Hertfordshire County Council 39 seats needed for a majority

	First party	Second party
Party	Conservative	Labour
Seats won	43	29
Seat change	▼22	▲23
Popular vote	144,864	121,219
Percentage	43.1%	36.0%
	Third party	Fourth party
Party	Liberal	Residents
Seats won	4	1
Seat change	▲4	Steady
Popular vote	63,868	2,973
Percentage	19.0%	0.9%
Council control before election
Conservative
Council control after election
Conservative

The 1981 Hertfordshire County Council election took place on 7 May 1981 to elect members of Hertfordshire County Council in Hertfordshire, England. This was on the same day as other local elections.

Boundary changes came into effect at this election with a new pattern of electoral divisions being used. The number of seats on the council was increased from 72 to 77.

At the election, the Conservatives retained control of the council, albeit with a significantly reduced majority. Labour made a major recovery, regaining many of the seats lost previously to the Conservatives in the urban areas of the county. The Liberals regained representation on the council after losing all their seats at the previous election.

== Summary ==
=== Election result ===
1981 Hertfordshire County Council election
Party	Candidates	Seats	Gains	Losses	Net gain/loss	Seats %	Votes %	Votes	+/−
Conservative	77	43			▼22	55.8	43.1	144,864	
Labour	76	29			▲23	37.7	36.0	121,219	
Liberal	63	4			▲4	5.2	19.0	63,868	
Residents	3	1			Steady	1.3	0.9	2,973	
Independent	3	0			Steady	0.0	0.4	1,509	
Ecology	6	0			Steady	0.0	0.4	1,297	
Independent Labour	2	0			Steady	0.0	0.1	430	
National Front	2	0			Steady	0.0	<0.1	117	
Communist	1	0			Steady	0.0	<0.1	98	
Workers Revolutionary	1	0			Steady	0.0	<0.1	61	

== Division results by local authority ==
=== Broxbourne ===
Broxbourne District Summary
Party	Seats	+/-	Votes	%	+/-
Conservative	6		11,988	48.8	
Labour	0		7,338	29.8	
Liberal	0		5,004	20.3	
Independent Labour	0		270	1.1	
Total	6		24,610	43.7	
Registered electors			56,332	–	

Division results

Cheshunt Central
Party	Candidate	Votes	%	±%
Conservative	S. Johnson	1,767	45.7	–25.2
Labour	C. Robbins	1,714	44.4	+15.3
Liberal	K. Fursse	382	9.9	N/A
Majority		53	1.4	–40.4
Turnout		3,863	44.0	
Registered electors		8,796		
Conservative hold		Swing	▼20.2	

Cheshunt North
Party	Candidate	Votes	%
Conservative	P. Madsen	1,616	48.3
Labour	M. Farrington	1,172	35.0
Liberal	P. Brown	561	16.8
Majority		444	13.3
Turnout		3,349	41.1
Registered electors		8,164	
Conservative win (new seat)			

Cheshunt West
Party	Candidate	Votes	%
Conservative	G. Batchelor	2,279	50.0
Liberal	P. Kemp	1,423	31.2
Labour	M. Crane	855	18.8
Majority		856	18.8
Turnout		4,557	48.5
Registered electors		9,394	
Conservative win (new seat)			

Hoddesdon North
Party	Candidate	Votes	%	±%
Conservative	J. Rose	2,092	50.2	–14.6
Labour	P. Garrett	1,054	25.3	+2.1
Liberal	J. Butler	1,023	24.5	+12.5
Majority		1,038	24.9	–16.7
Turnout		4,169	46.1	+4.0
Registered electors		9,057		
Conservative hold		Swing	▼8.4	

Hoddesdon South
Party	Candidate	Votes	%	±%
Conservative	J. Fiddy	2,250	54.9	–25.3
Liberal	J. Gould	1,198	29.2	N/A
Labour	A. Hillyard	650	15.9	–3.9
Majority		1,052	25.7	–34.7
Turnout		4,098	42.6	+6.5
Registered electors		9,640		
Conservative hold				

Waltham Cross
Party	Candidate	Votes	%
Conservative	H. Collins	1,994	43.6
Labour	T. Seymour	1,893	41.4
Liberal	L. Dines	417	9.1
Independent Labour	J. Paice	270	5.9
Majority		101	2.2
Turnout		4,574	40.7
Registered electors		11,281	
Conservative win (new seat)			

=== Dacorum ===
Dacorum District Summary
Party	Seats	+/-	Votes	%	+/-
Labour	5		19,940	43.3	
Conservative	5		19,495	42.3	
Liberal	0		6,027	13.1	
Ecology	0		469	1.0	
Communist	0		98	0.2	
Workers Revolutionary	0		61	0.1	
Total	10		46,090	47.7	
Registered electors			96,628	–	

Division results

Berkhamsted
Party	Candidate	Votes	%
Conservative	H. Rost	2,753	50.5
Labour	A. Fethney	1,442	26.5
Liberal	I. Scott	1,252	23.0
Majority		1,311	24.1
Turnout		5,447	47.7
Registered electors		11,450	
Conservative win (new seat)			

Bridgewater
Party	Candidate	Votes	%
Conservative	R. Humbert	2,042	63.3
Labour	J. Annison	634	19.7
Liberal	G. Davies	549	17.0
Majority		1,408	43.7
Turnout		3,225	44.1
Registered electors		7,337	
Conservative win (new seat)			

Hemel Hempstead East
Party	Candidate	Votes	%
Labour	J. Mercer	2,105	46.0
Conservative	G. Hanson	1,895	41.4
Liberal	J. Blackman	425	9.3
Ecology	R. Morrisey	155	3.4
Majority		210	4.6
Turnout		4,580	49.9
Registered electors		9,225	
Labour win (new seat)			

Hemel Hempstead North East
Party	Candidate	Votes	%
Labour	A. Short	1,997	49.0
Conservative	S. Parker	1,267	31.1
Liberal	J. Blackman	747	18.3
Workers Revolutionary	S. Phillips	61	1.5
Majority		730	17.9
Turnout		4,072	43.8
Registered electors		9,325	
Labour win (new seat)			

Hemel Hempstead North West
Party	Candidate	Votes	%
Labour	D. Moss	3,583	70.1
Conservative	G. Payne	1,431	28.0
Communist	R. Leigh	98	1.9
Majority		2,152	42.1
Turnout		5,112	49.6
Registered electors		10,358	
Labour win (new seat)			

Hemel Hempstead South East
Party	Candidate	Votes	%
Labour	R. Thorpe-Tracey	3,154	58.9
Conservative	B. Everall	1,624	30.3
Liberal	R. Wilson	581	10.8
Majority		1,530	28.6
Turnout		5,359	49.0
Registered electors		10,809	
Labour win (new seat)			

Hemel Hempstead St Pauls
Party	Candidate	Votes	%
Labour	P. Doyle	2,737	63.8
Conservative	C. Cadman	811	18.9
Liberal	G. Lawrence	743	17.3
Majority		1,926	44.9
Turnout		4,291	47.9
Registered electors		8,982	
Labour win (new seat)			

Hemel Hempstead Town
Party	Candidate	Votes	%
Conservative	C. Everall	2,884	55.7
Labour	P. Palfrey	2,293	44.3
Majority		591	11.4
Turnout		5,177	48.2
Registered electors		10,813	
Conservative win (new seat)			

Kings Langley
Party	Candidate	Votes	%	±%
Conservative	A. Anderson	2,386	58.5	–7.5
Labour	R. Cox	892	21.9	+5.9
Liberal	F. O'Connor	804	19.7	+1.7
Majority		1,494	36.6	–11.5
Turnout		4,082	50.3	–3.1
Registered electors		8,131		
Conservative hold		Swing	▼6.7	

Tring
Party	Candidate	Votes	%	±%
Conservative	A. Servis	2,402	50.6	–20.4
Labour	A. Maclaughlin	1,103	23.2	+9.2
Liberal	D. Badrick	926	19.5	+4.5
Ecology	R. Oliver	314	6.6	N/A
Majority		1,299	27.4	–28.6
Turnout		4,745	46.8	+2.4
Registered electors		10,198		
Conservative hold		Swing	▼14.8	

=== East Hertfordshire ===
East Hertfordshire District Summary
Party	Seats	+/-	Votes	%	+/-
Conservative	7		17,359	45.8	
Labour	1		9,417	24.9	
Residents	1		2,415	6.4	
Liberal	0		8,448	22.3	
Independent	0		242	0.6	
Total	9		37,881	47.2	
Registered electors			80,290	–	

Division results

All Saints
Party	Candidate	Votes	%	±%
Conservative	J. Forrester*	2,025	50.0	–23.5
Labour	G. Perrett	1,353	33.4	+6.9
Liberal	R. Fish	672	16.6	N/A
Majority		672	16.6	–30.4
Turnout		4,050	51.1	+4.1
Registered electors		7,946		
Conservative hold		Swing	▼15.2	

Bishops Stortford Central Parsonag
Party	Candidate	Votes	%
Residents	V. Ellison	1,343	34.2
Conservative	J. Hayes	1,006	25.6
Labour	M. Smith	911	23.2
Liberal	A. Wills	665	16.9
Majority		337	8.6
Turnout		3,925	44.5
Registered electors		8,890	
Residents win (new seat)			

Bishops Stortford Chantry Thorley
Party	Candidate	Votes	%
Conservative	J. Fielder	1,642	40.2
Residents	T. Davies	1,072	26.3
Liberal	D. James	805	19.7
Labour	E. Egginton	562	13.8
Majority		570	14.0
Turnout		4,081	50.7
Registered electors		8,114	
Conservative win (new seat)			

Braughing
Party	Candidate	Votes	%	±%
Conservative	I. Hinshelwood	1,837	46.6	–33.0
Liberal	R. Dickens	1,264	32.0	N/A
Labour	G. Zambonini	601	15.2	–5.2
Independent	D. Bailey	242	6.1	N/A
Majority		573	14.5	–44.7
Turnout		3,944	45.9	+6.5
Registered electors		8,630		
Conservative hold				

Hertford Rural
Party	Candidate	Votes	%	±%
Conservative	A. Hughes	2,570	52.7	–23.4
Liberal	A. Lawson	1,262	25.9	N/A
Labour	G. Balderstone	1,042	21.4	–2.5
Majority		1,308	26.8	–25.5
Turnout		4,874	50.0	–0.4
Registered electors		9,768		
Conservative hold				

Sawbridgeworth
Party	Candidate	Votes	%	±%
Conservative	G. Banwell	2,167	52.9	–26.9
Liberal	J. Gibb	1,261	30.8	N/A
Labour	M. Hudson	672	16.4	–3.8
Majority		906	22.1	–37.6
Turnout		4,100	43.0	+2.0
Registered electors		9,571		
Conservative hold				

St Andrews
Party	Candidate	Votes	%	±%
Labour	H. Mills	1,836	41.9	+0.4
Conservative	G. Stoten	1,826	41.7	–16.8
Liberal	R. Williams	719	16.4	N/A
Majority		10	0.2	N/A
Turnout		4,381	51.6	+1.8
Registered electors		8,519		
Labour gain from Conservative		Swing	▲8.6	

Ware North
Party	Candidate	Votes	%
Conservative	S. Smith	2,037	46.5
Liberal	D. Beavan	1,252	28.6
Labour	G. Herincx	1,096	25.0
Majority		785	17.9
Turnout		4,385	45.1
Registered electors		9,739	
Conservative win (new seat)			

Ware South
Party	Candidate	Votes	%
Conservative	C. Bowsher	2,249	54.3
Labour	D. Jones	1,344	32.5
Liberal	R. Denton	548	13.2
Majority		905	21.9
Turnout		4,141	45.4
Registered electors		9,114	
Conservative win (new seat)			

=== Hertsmere ===
Hertsmere District Summary
Party	Seats	+/-	Votes	%	+/-
Conservative	4		14,819	45.6	
Labour	2		9,031	27.8	
Liberal	1		8,632	26.6	
Total	7		32,482	48.8	
Registered electors			66,590	–	

Division results

Bushey Heath
Party	Candidate	Votes	%
Conservative	R. Pryde	1,972	60.4
Liberal	M. Colne	1,292	39.6
Majority		680	20.8
Turnout		3,264	46.0
Registered electors		7,185	
Conservative win (new seat)			

Bushey North
Party	Candidate	Votes	%
Liberal	M. Colne	3,112	56.1
Conservative	J. Hudson	1,978	35.6
Labour	M. Pountney	462	8.3
Majority		1,134	20.4
Turnout		5,552	55.0
Registered electors		10,084	
Liberal win (new seat)			

Elstree
Party	Candidate	Votes	%
Labour	A. Walton	2,457	48.5
Conservative	E. Fox	2,016	39.8
Liberal	J. Hyams	591	11.7
Majority		441	8.7
Turnout		5,064	48.0
Registered electors		10,645	
Labour win (new seat)			

Lyndhurst
Party	Candidate	Votes	%
Labour	J. Metcalf	3,073	68.7
Conservative	T. Warren	1,003	22.4
Liberal	G. Hillier	397	8.9
Majority		2,070	46.3
Turnout		4,473	44.0
Registered electors		10,104	
Labour win (new seat)			

Potters Bar North East
Party	Candidate	Votes	%
Conservative	J. Simons	2,467	60.9
Liberal	C. Cook	1,017	25.1
Labour	J. Holden	564	13.9
Majority		1,450	35.8
Turnout		4,048	48.0
Registered electors		8,488	
Conservative win (new seat)			

Potters Bar South West
Party	Candidate	Votes	%
Conservative	R. Fielding	2,551	51.8
Liberal	J. Hurd	1,401	28.4
Labour	H. Toch	977	19.8
Majority		1,150	23.3
Turnout		4,929	51.0
Registered electors		9,644	
Conservative win (new seat)			

Watling
Party	Candidate	Votes	%
Conservative	H. Saunders	2,832	55.0
Labour	P. O'Donoghue	1,498	29.1
Liberal	E. Dilley	822	16.0
Majority		1,334	25.9
Turnout		5,152	50.0
Registered electors		10,440	
Conservative win (new seat)			

=== North Hertfordshire ===
North Hertfordshire District Summary
Party	Seats	+/-	Votes	%	+/-
Conservative	5		15,216	42.8	
Labour	4		14,717	41.4	
Liberal	0		4,191	11.8	
Ecology	0		657	1.8	
Residents	0		558	1.6	
Independent Labour	0		160	0.4	
National Front	0		68	0.2	
Total	9		35,567	45.1	
Registered electors			78,945	–	

Division results

Hitchin North East
Party	Candidate	Votes	%
Labour	F. Peacock	2,354	49.1
Conservative	A. Boddington	1,607	33.5
Liberal	R. Lord	718	15.0
Ecology	R. Wise	112	2.3
Majority		747	15.6
Turnout		4,791	48.2
Registered electors		9,982	
Labour win (new seat)			

Hitchin South
Party	Candidate	Votes	%
Conservative	W. Hill	2,341	69.4
Labour	M. Goldsmith	760	22.5
Ecology	B. Goodale	270	8.0
Majority		1,581	46.9
Turnout		3,371	43.6
Registered electors		7,763	
Conservative win (new seat)			

Knebworth & Codicote
Party	Candidate	Votes	%
Conservative	K. Crofton	2,256	59.9
Labour	O. Swain	950	25.2
Residents	D. Bols	558	14.8
Majority		1,306	34.7
Turnout		3,764	46.1
Registered electors		8,206	
Conservative win (new seat)			

Letchworth East & Baldock
Party	Candidate	Votes	%
Labour	W. Miller	2,509	57.5
Conservative	F. Dodds	1,580	36.2
Ecology	S. Toogood	275	6.3
Majority		929	21.3
Turnout		4,364	48.1
Registered electors		9,108	
Labour win (new seat)			

Letchworth North West
Party	Candidate	Votes	%
Labour	M. Kearns	2,752	63.3
Conservative	B. Smith	1,597	36.7
Majority		1,155	26.6
Turnout		4,349	48.0
Registered electors		9,077	
Labour win (new seat)			

Letchworth South
Party	Candidate	Votes	%
Conservative	J. Talbot	2,294	45.2
Labour	D. Griffiths	1,511	29.8
Liberal	R. Stevens	1,266	25.0
Majority		783	15.4
Turnout		5,071	51.5
Registered electors		9,890	
Conservative win (new seat)			

North Herts Rural
Party	Candidate	Votes	%
Conservative	B. Goble	1,919	51.7
Liberal	A. Travis	1,092	29.4
Labour	N. Percival	701	18.9
Majority		827	22.3
Turnout		3,712	50.8
Registered electors		7,320	
Conservative win (new seat)			

Offa
Party	Candidate	Votes	%
Labour	D. Billing	2,272	52.0
Conservative	M. Perkins	1,866	42.7
Independent Labour	N. Lach	160	3.7
National Front	V. Logan	68	1.6
Majority		406	9.3
Turnout		4,366	47.2
Registered electors		9,305	
Labour win (new seat)			

Royston
Party	Candidate	Votes	%	±%
Conservative	H. Greenfield	1,786	46.9	–22.6
Liberal	H. Lord	1,115	29.3	+15.9
Labour	M. Kernaghan	908	23.8	+6.7
Majority		671	17.6	–34.9
Turnout		3,809	46.1	+2.0
Registered electors		8,294		
Conservative hold		Swing	▼17.5	

=== St Albans ===
St Albans District Summary
Party	Seats	+/-	Votes	%	+/-
Conservative	9		20,284	46.6	
Liberal	1		12,298	28.2	
Labour	0		9,748	22.4	
Independent	0		1,219	2.8	
Total	10		43,549	48.0	
Registered electors			90,655	–	

Division results

Harpenden North East
Party	Candidate	Votes	%
Conservative	G. Aspinall	2,650	52.0
Liberal	G. Tattersfield	1,564	30.7
Labour	H. Holmes	886	17.4
Majority		1,086	21.3
Turnout		5,100	44.5
Registered electors		10,705	
Conservative win (new seat)			

Harpenden South West
Party	Candidate	Votes	%
Conservative	I. Tarry	2,998	64.6
Liberal	J. Little	1,140	24.5
Labour	K. Griffin	506	10.9
Majority		1,858	40.0
Turnout		4,644	46.0
Registered electors		9,947	
Conservative win (new seat)			

Sandridge
Party	Candidate	Votes	%
Conservative	A. Ashford	1,476	49.2
Liberal	G. Churchard	1,009	33.6
Labour	M. Di-Lieto	517	17.2
Majority		467	15.6
Turnout		3,002	46.4
Registered electors		6,384	
Conservative hold			

St Albans Central
Party	Candidate	Votes	%
Conservative	K. Hill	1,847	42.6
Labour	P. Brown	1,251	28.9
Liberal	M. Thompson	1,238	28.6
Majority		596	13.7
Turnout		4,336	50.1
Registered electors		8,513	
Conservative win (new seat)			

St Albans East
Party	Candidate	Votes	%	±%
Liberal	D. Perrett	1,936	41.4	+19.8
Conservative	A. Vincent	1,662	35.5	–29.9
Labour	T. Morris	1,080	23.1	+10.1
Majority		274	5.9	N/A
Turnout		4,678	50.4	–0.3
Registered electors		9,185		
Liberal gain from Conservative		Swing	▲24.9	

St Albans North
Party	Candidate	Votes	%	±%
Conservative	A. Hill	1,931	40.3	–9.9
Liberal	L. Coates	1,677	35.0	+21.6
Labour	A. Ramsden	1,181	24.7	–11.7
Majority		254	5.3	–8.6
Turnout		4,789	49.0	–1.6
Registered electors		9,773		
Conservative hold		Swing	▼15.8	

St Albans Rural
Party	Candidate	Votes	%
Conservative	C. Parkinson	2,318	51.8
Independent	S. Bailey	1,219	27.2
Labour	C. Hucklesby	940	21.0
Majority		1,099	24.5
Turnout		4,477	49.7
Registered electors		8,874	
Conservative win (new seat)			

St Albans South
Party	Candidate	Votes	%	±%
Conservative	R. Durrant	1,925	41.2	–28.4
Liberal	C. Gunner	1,430	30.6	N/A
Labour	N. Harris	1,320	28.2	–2.2
Majority		495	10.6	–28.6
Turnout		4,675	48.9	+5.4
Registered electors		9,448		
Conservative hold				

St Stephens
Party	Candidate	Votes	%
Conservative	F. Hulley	2,165	49.6
Liberal	H. Woollatt	1,429	32.8
Labour	H. Cazel-Williams	767	17.6
Majority		736	16.9
Turnout		4,361	44.6
Registered electors		9,722	
Conservative win (new seat)			

The Colneys
Party	Candidate	Votes	%
Conservative	R. Ellis	1,312	37.6
Labour	P. Landman	1,300	37.3
Liberal	A. Angelow	875	25.1
Majority		12	0.3
Turnout		3,487	42.9
Registered electors		8,104	
Conservative win (new seat)			

=== Stevenage ===
Stevenage District Summary
Party	Seats	+/-	Votes	%	+/-
Labour	6		12,824	54.0	
Conservative	0		6,055	25.5	
Liberal	0		4,802	20.2	
National Front	0		49	0.2	
Total	6		23,730	43.9	
Registered electors			54,008	–	

Division results

Bedwell
Party	Candidate	Votes	%	±%
Labour	H. Lawrence	2,567	57.5	+14.6
Conservative	H. Silberstein*	1,097	24.6	–20.7
Liberal	G. Robbins	798	17.9	+9.3
Majority		1,470	32.9	N/A
Turnout		4,462	47.6	–0.1
Registered electors		9,426		
Labour gain from Conservative		Swing	▲17.7	

Broadwater
Party	Candidate	Votes	%
Labour	W. Sheaff	1,941	50.1
Conservative	H. Grant	1,016	26.2
Liberal	E. Brock	868	22.4
National Front	A. Bullock	49	1.3
Majority		925	23.9
Turnout		3,874	43.8
Registered electors		8,885	
Labour win (new seat)			

Chells
Party	Candidate	Votes	%
Labour	R. Lloyd	1,999	57.0
Conservative	C. Nicholson	759	21.7
Liberal	L. Atkins	747	21.3
Majority		1,240	35.4
Turnout		3,505	44.3
Registered electors		7,971	
Labour win (new seat)			

Old Stevenage
Party	Candidate	Votes	%	±%
Labour	L. Robbins	2,145	46.6	+13.5
Conservative	W. Boyd	1,729	37.6	–16.5
Liberal	S. Booth	727	15.8	+6.6
Majority		416	9.0	N/A
Turnout		4,601	45.3	+1.9
Registered electors		10,191		
Labour gain from Conservative		Swing	▲15.0	

Shephall
Party	Candidate	Votes	%
Labour	S. Greenfield	2,075	63.6
Liberal	R. Edwards	635	19.5
Conservative	R. Oliver	553	16.9
Majority		1,440	44.1
Turnout		3,263	40.5
Registered electors		8,103	
Labour win (new seat)			

St Nicholas
Party	Candidate	Votes	%
Labour	T. Corner	2,097	52.1
Liberal	C. Hargreaves	1,027	25.5
Conservative	A. Hurst	901	22.4
Majority		1,070	26.6
Turnout		4,025	43.0
Registered electors		9,432	
Labour win (new seat)			

=== Three Rivers ===
Three Rivers District Summary
Party	Seats	+/-	Votes	%	+/-
Conservative	4		16,756	49.8	
Liberal	2		8,475	25.2	
Labour	1		8,445	25.1	
Total	7		33,676	50.3	
Registered electors			66,900	–	

Division results

Abbotts Langley
Party	Candidate	Votes	%
Conservative	R. Peevers	2,306	39.0
Labour	R. Halsey	2,112	35.7
Liberal	C. Sivers	1,502	25.4
Majority		194	3.3
Turnout		5,920	54.5
Registered electors		11,589	
Conservative win (new seat)			

Chorleywood
Party	Candidate	Votes	%	±%
Conservative	F. Cogan*	2,728	65.1	–9.9
Liberal	S. Eyre	1,002	23.9	+10.7
Labour	N. Doggett	461	11.0	–0.8
Majority		1,726	41.2	–20.6
Turnout		4,191	48.9	–5.9
Registered electors		8,431		
Conservative hold		Swing	▼10.3	

Croxley
Party	Candidate	Votes	%
Liberal	J. Vosper	1,934	42.2
Conservative	F. Thompson	1,904	41.6
Labour	A. Frost	740	16.2
Majority		30	0.7
Turnout		4,578	53.0
Registered electors		8,638	
Liberal win (new seat)			

North Mymms
Party	Candidate	Votes	%	±%
Conservative	A. Roy	3,695	83.8	+5.0
Labour	P. Kingsford	715	16.2	–5.0
Majority		2,980	67.6	+10.0
Turnout		4,410	51.6	–0.4
Registered electors		8,583		
Conservative hold		Swing	▲5.0	

Oxhey Park
Party	Candidate	Votes	%
Conservative	S. Purkiss	2,894	65.1
Liberal	R. Fanshawe	879	19.8
Labour	N. Crump	671	15.1
Majority		2,015	45.3
Turnout		4,444	46.0
Registered electors		9,553	
Conservative win (new seat)			

Rickmansworth
Party	Candidate	Votes	%
Liberal	A. Witney	2,556	43.8
Conservative	E. Willden	2,380	40.7
Labour	B. Woolner	905	15.5
Majority		176	3.0
Turnout		5,841	53.3
Registered electors		10,439	
Liberal win (new seat)			

South Oxhey
Party	Candidate	Votes	%
Labour	D. Waddington	2,841	66.2
Conservative	A. Duncan	849	19.8
Liberal	R. Carter	602	14.0
Majority		1,992	46.4
Turnout		4,292	44.0
Registered electors		9,667	
Labour win (new seat)			

=== Watford ===
Watford District Summary
Party	Seats	+/-	Votes	%	+/-
Labour	5		10,834	44.1	
Conservative	1		9,284	37.8	
Liberal	0		4,474	18.2	
Total	6		24,592	44.5	
Registered electors			55,294	–	

Division results

Callowland Leggatts
Party	Candidate	Votes	%
Labour	J. Dore	2,062	62.6
Conservative	R. Curtis	763	23.1
Liberal	S. Rosser	471	14.3
Majority		1,299	39.4
Turnout		3,296	38.6
Registered electors		8,433	
Labour win (new seat)			

Central Oxhey
Party	Candidate	Votes	%
Labour	S. Meldrum	1,665	39.5
Conservative	R. Van Kimmenade	1,541	36.6
Liberal	A. Poole	1,004	23.8
Majority		124	2.9
Turnout		4,210	49.7
Registered electors		8,409	
Labour win (new seat)			

Meriden Tudor
Party	Candidate	Votes	%
Labour	D. Rohan	2,123	47.8
Conservative	I. Tunstall-Dunn	1,336	30.1
Liberal	D. Pedder-Smith	979	22.1
Majority		787	17.7
Turnout		4,438	42.2
Registered electors		10,400	
Labour win (new seat)			

Nascot Park
Party	Candidate	Votes	%
Conservative	P. Bolshaw	2,824	67.4
Liberal	E. Selby	776	18.5
Labour	R. Gale	591	14.1
Majority		2,048	48.9
Turnout		4,191	46.4
Registered electors		8,918	
Conservative win (new seat)			

Vicarage Holywell
Party	Candidate	Votes	%
Labour	P. Roe	2,222	53.0
Conservative	V. Hallam	1,354	32.3
Liberal	M. Watkin	613	14.6
Majority		868	20.7
Turnout		4,189	44.4
Registered electors		9,364	
Labour win (new seat)			

Woodside Stanborough
Party	Candidate	Votes	%
Labour	C. Dore	2,171	50.9
Conservative	S. Boyce	1,466	34.3
Liberal	B. Nottingham	631	14.8
Majority		705	16.5
Turnout		4,268	43.2
Registered electors		9,770	
Labour win (new seat)			

=== Welwyn Hatfield ===
Welwyn Hatfield District Summary
Party	Seats	+/-	Votes	%	+/-
Labour	5		18,925	55.2	
Conservative	2		13,608	39.7	
Liberal	0		1,517	4.4	
Ecology	0		171	0.5	
Independent	0		48	0.1	
Total	7		34,269	54.4	
Registered electors			63,021	–	

Division results

Haldens
Party	Candidate	Votes	%
Labour	R. Mays	2,713	68.3
Conservative	H. Bennett	1,261	31.7
Majority		1,452	36.5
Turnout		3,974	51.5
Registered electors		7,744	
Labour win (new seat)			

Hatfield East
Party	Candidate	Votes	%	±%
Conservative	M. Clark*	2,018	49.1	–12.7
Labour	J. Stephens	1,623	39.5	+9.7
Liberal	D. Bird	472	11.5	+3.2
Majority		395	9.6	–22.4
Turnout		4,113	53.4	–1.3
Registered electors		7,717		
Conservative hold		Swing	▼11.2	

Hatfield North
Party	Candidate	Votes	%
Labour	S. Clark	3,018	60.9
Conservative	W. Jones	1,940	39.1
Majority		1,078	21.7
Turnout		4,958	53.6
Registered electors		9,287	
Labour win (new seat)			

Hatfield South
Party	Candidate	Votes	%
Labour	G. Wenham	2,707	58.6
Conservative	M. Harris	1,868	40.4
Independent	J. Bardwaj	48	1.0
Majority		839	18.1
Turnout		4,623	56.0
Registered electors		8,286	
Labour win (new seat)			

Welwyn
Party	Candidate	Votes	%	±%
Conservative	A. Lower*	2,901	60.9	–17.6
Labour	M. Cooper	1,863	39.1	+17.6
Majority		1,038	21.8	–35.2
Turnout		4,764	52.8	+1.4
Registered electors		9,073		
Conservative hold		Swing	▼17.6	

Welwyn Garden City South
Party	Candidate	Votes	%	±%
Labour	L. Charles	3,839	75.1	+17.2
Conservative	S. Graham	1,271	24.9	–17.2
Majority		2,568	50.3	+34.5
Turnout		5,110	54.3	+0.4
Registered electors		9,474		
Labour hold		Swing	▲17.2	

Welwyn Garden City West
Party	Candidate	Votes	%	±%
Labour	U. Bennett	3,162	47.0	+1.8
Conservative	D. Ashworth	2,349	34.9	–19.9
Liberal	A. Last	1,045	15.5	N/A
Ecology	C. Nobbs	171	2.5	N/A
Majority		813	12.1	N/A
Turnout		6,727	59.0	+9.0
Registered electors		11,440		
Labour gain from Conservative		Swing	▲10.9	
