= 1981 Greater Manchester County Council election =

1981 UK local government election

Local elections to Greater Manchester County Council, a Metropolitan County Council encompassing Greater Manchester, were held on 7 May 1981, resulting in large swings to Labour, giving them control of the council.

This would be the last election to the Greater Manchester County Council, with metropolitan county councils being scrapped on 31 March 1986 under the Local Government Act 1985 by the Conservative government of Margaret Thatcher. The councils' abolition came following several high-profile clashes between mostly Labour metropolitan county councils and the Conservative government over issues including overspending and high rates charging.

== Results ==
=== Overall Results ===
Greater Manchester County Council election, 1981
Party	Seats	Gains	Losses	Net gain/loss	Seats %	Votes %	Votes	+/−
Labour	78					49.6		▲15.2
Conservative	19					30.6		▼25.5
Liberal	9					18.4		▲10.9
Independent	0				0.0	0.2		▼0.1
Green	0				0.0	0.2		▲0.2
Other parties	0				0.0	1.0		▼0.7

== Borough summary ==
Results of the Greater Manchester County Council election, 1981 by Metropolitan Borough
Borough	%	Cllrs	%	Cllrs	%	Cllrs	%	Cllrs	%	Cllrs	%	Cllrs	Total Cllrs
Borough	Labour		Conservative		Liberal		Green		Independent		Others		Total Cllrs
Bolton	49.0	7	34.4	2	16.2	1	0.0	0	0.0	0	0.4	0	10
Bury	49.6	5	34.0	1	14.2	0	0.0	0	2.3	0	0.4	0	6
Manchester	55.7	16	27.7	3	15.0	1	0.5	0	0.0	0	1.1	0	20
Oldham	50.5	7	30.5	1	18.0	1	0.0	0	0.0	0	1.0	0	9
Rochdale	43.5	5	29.7	0	24.3	2	0.0	0	0.0	0	2.5	0	7
Salford	59.8	11	23.8	0	15.3	1	0.0	0	0.0	0	1.1	0	12
Stockport	29.0	3	37.7	6	32.1	2	0.7	0	0.0	0	0.4	0	11
Tameside	57.3	9	29.7	0	11.9	0	0.6	0	0.0	0	0.4	0	9
Trafford	36.6	3	43.1	6	20.4	0	0.0	0	0.0	0	0.0	0	9
Wigan	65.8	12	16.5	0	14.5	1	0.0	0	0.0	0	3.2	0	13
Total	49.6	78	30.6	19	18.4	9	0.2	0	0.2	0	1.0	0	106
