= 1981 Norfolk County Council election =

1981 English local election

- 7 May 1981

All 83 seats to Norfolk County Council 42 seats needed for a majority

	First party	Second party
Party	Conservative	Labour
Seats won	51	27
Seat change	▼19	▲14
Popular vote	101,099	92,406
Percentage	44.0%	40.3%
Swing	▼20.5%	▲10.0%
	Third party	Fourth party
Party	Liberal	Independent
Seats won	4	1
Seat change	▲4	▲1
Popular vote	31,536	3,608
Percentage	13.7%	1.6%
Swing	▲10.5%	▲0.4%
Council control before election
Conservative
Council control after election
Conservative

The 1981 Norfolk County Council election took place on 7 May 1981 to elect members of Norfolk County Council in Norfolk, England. This was on the same day as other local elections.

== Summary ==
=== Election result ===
1981 Norfolk County Council election
Party	Candidates	Seats	Gains	Losses	Net gain/loss	Seats %	Votes %	Votes	+/−
Conservative	83	51			▼19	61.4	44.0	101,099	–20.5
Labour	83	27			▲14	32.5	40.3	92,406	+10.0
Liberal	52	4			▲4	4.8	13.7	31,536	+10.5
Independent	6	1			▲1	1.2	1.6	3,608	+0.4
Ecology	7	0	0	0	Steady	0.0	0.4	886	N/A
