= BNL =

BNL may refer to:

== Entertainment ==
- Banjo Newsletter, a magazine devoted to the 5-string banjo
- Barenaked Ladies, a rock band from Canada
- Basketball National League, South Africa's top basketball division
- British National League (disambiguation), two former ice hockey leagues
- Buy-n-Large, a fictional megacorporation featured in the movie WALL-E

== Organisations ==
- Banca Nazionale del Lavoro, an Italian bank
- Brookhaven National Laboratory, New York, US

== Other uses ==
- Uptown Station, train station in Normal, Illinois, USA; Amtrak station code BNL
- Block nested loop, an algorithm in computing
