= 1977 Moyle District Council election =

Local government election in Northern Ireland

| ← 1973 | 18 May 1977 | 1981 → |

All 16 seats to Moyle District Council 9 seats needed for a majority
| | First party | Second party | Third party |
|---|---|---|---|
| Party | Independent | SDLP | UUP |
| Seats won | 6 | 3 | 3 |
| Seat change | ▼1 | ▲1 | ▼2 |
| | Fourth party | Fifth party |
| Party | DUP | Ind. Unionist |
| Seats won | 2 | 2 |
| Seat change | ▲2 | 0 |

Elections to Moyle District Council were held on 18 May 1977 on the same day as the other Northern Irish local government elections. The election used three district electoral areas to elect a total of 16 councillors.

== Election results ==
Moyle District Council Election Result 1977
| Party | Seats | Gains | Losses | Net gain/loss | Seats % | Votes % | Votes | +/− |
|---|---|---|---|---|---|---|---|---|
| Independent | 6 | 0 | 1 | ▼1 | 37.5 | 37.1 | 2,215 | ▼10.2 |
| SDLP | 3 | 1 | 0 | ▲1 | 18.8 | 22.6 | 1,350 | ▲10.6 |
| UUP | 3 | 0 | 2 | ▼2 | 18.8 | 17.6 | 1,050 | ▼4.3 |
| Ind. Unionist | 2 | 0 | 0 | 0 | 12.5 | 10.7 | 637 | ▲3.4 |
| DUP | 2 | 2 | 0 | ▲2 | 12.5 | 7.7 | 461 | New |
| Alliance | 0 | 0 | 0 | 0 | 0.0 | 2.9 | 173 | ▼2.1 |
| Unionist Party NI | 0 | 0 | 0 | 0 | 0.0 | 1.3 | 80 | New |

Note: "Votes" are the first preference votes.

== Districts summary ==
Results of the Moyle District Council election, 1977 by district
| Ward | % | Cllrs | % | Cllrs | % | Cllrs | % | Cllrs | Total Cllrs |
| Ward | SDLP | | UUP | | DUP | | Others | | Total Cllrs |
|---|---|---|---|---|---|---|---|---|---|
| Area A | 30.4 | 1 | 0.0 | 0 | 0.0 | 0 | 69.6 | 3 | 4 |
| Area B | 0.0 | 0 | 30.5 | 2 | 18.3 | 2 | 51.2 | 4 | 8 |
| Area C | 51.9 | 2 | 19.7 | 1 | 0.0 | 0 | 28.4 | 1 | 4 |
| Total | 22.6 | 3 | 17.6 | 3 | 7.7 | 2 | 52.1 | 8 | 16 |

== Districts results ==
=== Area A ===
1973: 4 x Independent
1977: 3 x Independent, 1 x SDLP
1973-1977 Change: SDLP gain from Independent

Moyle Area A - 4 seats
| Party | Candidate | FPv% | Count | | | |
| Party | Candidate | FPv% | 1 | 2 | 3 | 4 |
|---|---|---|---|---|---|---|
| Independent | Fergus Wheeler* | 20.03% | 406 | | | |
| Independent | Alistair McSparran* | 19.44% | 394 | 559 | | |
| Independent | Patrick McCarry* | 17.96% | 364 | 379 | 430 | |
| SDLP | Archie McIntosh | 16.08% | 326 | 352 | 386 | 397.44 |
| SDLP | John McKay | 14.31% | 290 | 328 | 373 | 385.32 |
| Independent | Arthur McAlister* | 12.19% | 247 | | | |
Electorate: 2,716 Valid: 2,027 (74.63%) Spoilt: 56 Quota: 406 Turnout: 2,083 (76.69%)

=== Area B ===
1973: 4 x UUP, 2 x Independent Unionist, 2 x Independent
1977: 2 x UUP, 2 x DUP, 2 x Independent Unionist, 2 x Independent
1973-1977 Change: DUP (two seats) gain from UUP (two seats)

Moyle Area B - 8 seats
| Party | Candidate | FPv% | Count | | | | | | | | |
| Party | Candidate | FPv% | 1 | 2 | 3 | 4 | 5 | 6 | 7 | 8 | 9 |
|---|---|---|---|---|---|---|---|---|---|---|---|
| Independent | James McShane* | 18.70% | 472 | | | | | | | | |
| UUP | Price McConaghy* | 16.64% | 420 | | | | | | | | |
| Ind. Unionist | Matt Colgan | 13.19% | 333 | | | | | | | | |
| UUP | Robert McKay* | 8.16% | 206 | 210.8 | 271.66 | 291.82 | | | | | |
| Ind. Unionist | Samuel Adams* | 6.30% | 159 | 170.4 | 180.26 | 182.5 | 183.5 | 200.42 | 303.42 | | |
| Independent | Maureen Gaston | 4.08% | 103 | 263 | 262.86 | 267.02 | 267.02 | 280.58 | 298.58 | | |
| DUP | Mary Morrison | 8.95% | 226 | 226.6 | 235.44 | 239.92 | 247.6 | 269.82 | 271.98 | 272.74 | 273.24 |
| DUP | George McFadden | 6.58% | 166 | 168.4 | 169.76 | 171.52 | 215.52 | 221.9 | 228.24 | 235.84 | 237.84 |
| Ind. Unionist | Lee Walker | 5.74% | 145 | 145.6 | 156.48 | 167.36 | 180.36 | 193.2 | 201.2 | 215.26 | 223.26 |
| UUP | Hugh Acheson* | 5.74% | 145 | 157 | 160.06 | 161.18 | 161.18 | 166.38 | | | |
| Unionist Party NI | William McConaghy | 3.17% | 80 | 89 | 119.6 | 124.24 | 126.24 | | | | |
| DUP | Ronnie McIlvar | 2.73% | 69 | 69 | 70.36 | 70.68 | | | | | |
Electorate: 4,511 Valid: 2,524 (55.95%) Spoilt: 65 Quota: 281 Turnout: 2,589 (57.39%)

=== Area C ===
1973: 2 x SDLP, 1 x UUP, 1 x Independent
1977: 2 x SDLP, 1 x UUP, 1 x Independent
1973-1977 Change: No change

Moyle Area C - 5 seats
| Party | Candidate | FPv% | Count | | | |
| Party | Candidate | FPv% | 1 | 2 | 3 | 4 |
|---|---|---|---|---|---|---|
| SDLP | John Black* | 29.54% | 418 | | | |
| UUP | Elizabeth Johnston* | 19.72% | 279 | 283.48 | 287.48 | |
| Independent | Archibald McAuley* | 16.18% | 229 | 255.88 | 266.48 | 334.48 |
| SDLP | John McAfee* | 14.13% | 200 | 248.64 | 256.52 | 281.48 |
| SDLP | Joseph Donaghy | 8.20% | 116 | 159.84 | 169.12 | 187.76 |
| Alliance | John Scott | 7.56% | 107 | 108.28 | 147.92 | |
| Alliance | Maurice McHenry | 4.66% | 66 | 73.36 | | |
Electorate: 2,304 Valid: 1,415 (61.41%) Spoilt: 66 Quota: 284 Turnout: 1,481 (64.28%)
