= 1973 Moyle District Council election =

Local government election in Northern Ireland

30 May 1973	1977 →

All 16 seats to Moyle District Council 9 seats needed for a majority
	First party	Second party	Third party
Party	Independent	UUP	SDLP
Seats won	7	5	2
	Fourth party
Party	Ind. Unionist
Seats won	2

Elections to Moyle District Council were held on 30 May 1973 on the same day as the other Northern Irish local government elections. The election used three district electoral areas to elect a total of 16 councillors.

== Election results ==
Party	Seats	±	First Pref. votes	FPv%	±%
Independent	7		3,156	47.3	
UUP	5		1,457	21.9	
SDLP	2		799	12.0	
Ind. Unionist	2		488	7.3	
Alliance	0		334	5.0	
Ulster Liberal	0		77	1.2	
Totals	16		6,668	100.0	—

== Districts summary ==
Results of the Moyle District Council election, 1973 by district
Ward	%	Cllrs	%	Cllrs	%	Cllrs	Total Cllrs
Ward	UUP		SDLP		Others		Total Cllrs
Area A	0.0	0	4.6	0	95.4	4	4
Area B	48.4	4	0.0	0	51.6	4	8
Area C	27.9	1	43.1	2	29.0	1	4
Total	21.9	5	12.0	2	66.1	9	16

== Districts results ==
=== Area A ===
1973: 4 x Independent

Moyle Area A - 4 seats
Party	Candidate	FPv%	Count							
Party	Candidate	FPv%	1	2	3	4	5	6	7	8
Independent	Alistair McSparran	23.87%	533							
Independent	Fergus Wheeler	21.67%	484							
Independent	Patrick McCarry	15.94%	356	360.32	361.84	379.08	388.64	493.64		
Independent	Arthur McAlister	8.82%	197	238.44	249.24	268.1	329.6	353.04	372.29	458.29
Independent	P. McCambridge	8.82%	149	163.56	175.88	188.68	214.48	227	245.48	????
Independent	P. P. Delargy	8.33%	186	192.24	196.48	210.44	224.4	233.04	241.51	
Independent	J. McCaughan	5.69%	127	129.08	130.2	159.76	161.89			
SDLP	Joseph Lynn	4.61%	103	114.68	118.36	125.92				
Alliance	W. Grace	2.24%	50	51.92	52.32					
Independent	D. McAlister	2.15%	48	49.12	50.32					
Electorate: 2,644 Valid: 2,233 (84.46%) Spoilt: 15 Quota: 447 Turnout: 2,248 (85.02%)

- Data missing from McCambridge's vote in stage 8, because the count was not continued after McAlister was elected over the quota for the final seat.

=== Area B ===
1973: 4 x UUP, 2 x Independent Unionist, 2 x Independent

Moyle Area B - 8 seats
Party	Candidate	FPv%	Count						
Party	Candidate	FPv%	1	2	3	4	5	6	7
UUP	Robert McKay	18.96%	535						
UUP	Price McConaghy	12.66%	357						
Ind. Unionist	Samuel Adams	9.75%	275	299.6	306.56	331.56			
UUP	W. Baxter	9.22%	260	307.15	313.39	316.59			
Ind. Unionist	Hugh Acheson	7.55%	213	272.45	276.77	309.54	331.54		
Independent	James Gault	9.25%	261	283.55	292.31	313.9	330.9		
UUP	S. Montgomery	7.52%	212	254.23	263.71	283.65	327.65		
Independent	James McShane	8.83%	249	249.82	250.3	250.83	275.83	278.83	283.83
Independent	James McToal	8.26%	233	233	233	233	236.12	237.12	238.12
Alliance	R. Irwin	4.57%	129	137.2	138.52	143.28			
DUP	R. W. Taggart	3.44%	97	110.12	113.96				
Electorate: 4,655 Valid: 2,821 (60.60%) Spoilt: 28 Quota: 314 Turnout: 2,849 (61.20%)

=== Area C ===
1973: 2 x SDLP, 1 x UUP, 1 x Independent

Moyle Area C - 5 seats
Party	Candidate	FPv%	Count						
Party	Candidate	FPv%	1	2	3	4	5	6	7
UUP	Elizabeth Johnston	20.07%	324						
SDLP	John Black	17.10%	276	281	302	336			
SDLP	John McAfee	10.90%	176	190	210	223	227	360	
Independent	Archibald McAuley	10.47%	169	176	186	194	243	286	311.85
Alliance	E. Molloy	9.60%	155	168	181	183	229	250	261
SDLP	C. Lynn	9.91%	160	165	173	202	208		
UUP	J. Greer	7.81%	126	140	142	146			
SDLP	F. Duncan	5.20%	84	89	91				
Ulster Liberal	J. B. Bakewell	4.77%	77	80					
Independent	A. J. Watt	4.15%	67						
Electorate: 2,185 Valid: 1,614 (73.87%) Spoilt: 19 Quota: 323 Turnout: 1,633 (74.74%)
