= British National League =

British National League may refer to:

- British National League (1954–1960), a United Kingdom ice hockey league
- British National League (1996–2005), a United Kingdom ice hockey league
