= 1981 Moyle District Council election =

Local government election in Northern Ireland

← 1977	20 May 1981	1985 →

All 16 seats to Moyle District Council 9 seats needed for a majority
	First party	Second party	Third party
Party	SDLP	UUP	Independent
Seats won	5	4	3
Seat change	▲2	▲1	▼3
	Fourth party	Fifth party
Party	DUP	Ind. Unionist
Seats won	2	2
Seat change	Steady	Steady

Elections to Moyle District Council were held on 20 May 1981 on the same day as the other Northern Irish local government elections. The election used three district electoral areas to elect a total of 16 councillors.

== Election results ==
Moyle District Council Election Result 1981
Party	Seats	Gains	Losses	Net gain/loss	Seats %	Votes %	Votes	+/−
SDLP	5	2	0	▲2	31.3	28.4	1,882	▲5.8
UUP	4	1	0	▲1	25.0	13.5	895	▼4.1
Independent	3	0	3	▼3	18.8	18.4	1,222	▼19.6
DUP	2	0	0	Steady	12.5	15.1	1,005	▲7.4
Ind. Unionist	2	0	0	Steady	12.5	10.3	681	▼0.4
Irish Independence	0	0	0	Steady	0.0	7.3	487	New
Alliance	0	0	0	Steady	0.0	7.0	465	▲4.1

Note: "Votes" are the first preference votes.

== Districts summary ==
Results of the Moyle District Council election, 1981 by district
Ward	%	Cllrs	%	Cllrs	%	Cllrs	%	Cllrs	Total Cllrs
Ward	SDLP		UUP		DUP		Others		Total Cllrs
Area A	56.0	3	0.0	0	0.0	0	44.0	1	4
Area B	0.0	0	25.9	3	30.4	2	43.7	3	8
Area C	42.2	2	9.4	1	8.0	0	40.4	1	4
Total	28.4	5	13.5	4	15.1	2	43.0	5	16

== Districts results ==
=== Area A ===
1977: 3 x Independent, 1 x SDLP
1981: 3 x SDLP, 1 x Independent
1977-1981 Change: SDLP (two seats) gain from Independent (two seats)

Moyle Area A - 4 seats
Party	Candidate	FPv%	Count					
Party	Candidate	FPv%	1	2	3	4	5	6
SDLP	Malachy McSparran	22.12%	477					
Independent	Fergus Wheeler*	21.38%	461					
SDLP	Archie McIntosh*	11.50%	248	264.8	275.24	282.24	298.2	434.3
SDLP	Gerard Gillan	12.15%	262	266.6	266.84	278.84	380.8	408.34
Irish Independence	John McKay	11.18%	241	249.1	255.58	277.8	303.64	353.7
SDLP	Charles Hamill	10.20%	220	229.5	234.06	238.06	241.18	
Independent	Thomas O'Neill	4.45%	96	99.6	102.06	115.12		
Independent	Gerard McCarry	3.85%	83	84.2	84.92	92.08		
Irish Independence	Anna Edwards	3.15%	68	68.2	68.44			
Electorate: 2,776 Valid: 2,156 (77.67%) Spoilt: 46 Quota: 432 Turnout: 2,202 (79.32%)

=== Area B ===
1977: 2 x UUP, 2 x DUP, 2 x Independent Unionist, 2 x Independent
1981: 3 x UUP, 2 x DUP, 2 x Independent Unionist, 1 x Independent
1977-1981 Change: UUP gain from Independent

Moyle Area B - 8 seats
Party	Candidate	FPv%	Count									
Party	Candidate	FPv%	1	2	3	4	5	6	7	8	9	10
DUP	James Rodgers	15.44%	445									
Independent	James McShane*	11.97%	345									
Ind. Unionist	Price McConaghy*	13.22%	381									
Ind. Unionist	Mary Morrison*	10.41%	300	310.08	326.4							
UUP	Robert Getty	10.37%	299	299.84	313.1	313.1	316.44	325.44				
DUP	Ronnie McIlvar	8.43%	243	257.28	258.98	258.98	297.4	298.13	298.49	298.49	397.49	
UUP	Hugh Acheson	8.78%	253	254.12	261.6	263.6	267.77	271.45	273.25	275.14	291	305
UUP	James McAuley	6.70%	193	206.72	217.6	217.6	218.16	236.5	238.3	239.56	274.69	287.69
Alliance	Maurice McHenry	4.93%	142	142.56	143.75	164.35	164.35	222.72	222.81	223.44	226.09	227.09
DUP	Andrew Dobbin	4.61%	133	200.48	203.88	203.88	219.58	221.58	222.75	223.38		
Alliance	John Shanks	3.19%	92	94.52	97.58	98.68	99.68					
DUP	Samuel Simpson	1.94%	56	68.6	70.47	70.67						
Electorate: 4,438 Valid: 2,882 (64.94%) Spoilt: 73 Quota: 321 Turnout: 2,955 (66.58%)

=== Area C ===
1977: 2 x SDLP, 1 x UUP, 1 x Independent
1981: 2 x SDLP, 1 x UUP, 1 x Independent
1977-1981 Change: No change

Moyle Area C - 4 seats
Party	Candidate	FPv%	Count					
Party	Candidate	FPv%	1	2	3	4	5	6
SDLP	Richard Kerr	18.51%	296	304	304	385		
SDLP	Michael O'Cleary	13.88%	222	229	229	272	324	
UUP	Elizabeth Johnston*	9.38%	150	156	246	249	249.8	354.8
Independent	Archibald McAuley*	14.82%	237	251	255	280	288.8	332.8
Irish Independence	Eamonn Scally	11.13%	178	184	184	196	198.4	198.4
Alliance	Hugh Sayers	8.69%	139	160	181	185	185.8	
SDLP	Joseph Donaghy	9.82%	157	170	170			
DUP	Norman Campbell	8.01%	128	132				
Alliance	Thomas Cecil	5.75%	92					
Electorate: 2,393 Valid: 1,599 (66.82%) Spoilt: 48 Quota: 320 Turnout: 1,647 (68.83%)
