= 1981 West Yorkshire County Council election =

1981 UK local government election

The final elections to West Yorkshire County Council were held in May 1981. Labour regained majority control, which they held from 1973 to 1977, after four years of majority Conservative control. The elections which should have been held in 1985 were not held (in common with the other Metropolitan Counties and the Greater London Council) as the Act to abolish Metropolitan Counties had by then been passed. The term of the existing council and councillors was extended to 1 April 1986, to complete the job of passing the functions of the Council to the successor authorities.

== Ward results ==
The full results for all counties are available here: Local Elections Handbook 1981

== Leeds Ward Results ==
Aireborough
| Party | Candidate | Votes | % | ±% |
|---|---|---|---|---|
| Liberal | Janet Ann Brown | 4,296 | 40.2 | |
| Conservative | John D. Atkinson | 4,141 | 38.8 | |
| Labour | K.P. Evans | 2,069 | 19.4 | |
| Ecology | R. Cresswell | 179 | 1.7 | |
| Majority | | 155 | 1.4 | |
| Turnout | | 10,685 | 45.1 | |
| Liberal gain from Conservative | | Swing | | |

Leeds No. 1 Armley and Castleton
| Party | Candidate | Votes | % | ±% |
|---|---|---|---|---|
| Liberal | P.M. McCarthy | 3,196 | 48.3 | |
| Labour | A.R. Gunter | 2,607 | 39.4 | |
| Conservative | G. Broadbent | 762 | 11.5 | |
| Communist | J.A. Light | 57 | 0.9 | |
| Majority | | 589 | 8.9 | |
| Turnout | | 6,622 | 38.7 | |
| Liberal hold | | Swing | | |

Leeds No. 2 Beeston and Holbeck
| Party | Candidate | Votes | % | ±% |
|---|---|---|---|---|
| Labour | Dennis Burrill Mathews | 4,883 | 64.2 | |
| Conservative | William Birch | 1,616 | 21.2 | |
| Liberal | J.W. Ellis | 1,011 | 13.3 | |
| National Front | P.A. Spink | 97 | 1.3 | |
| Majority | | 3,267 | 43.0 | |
| Turnout | | 7,607 | 38.2 | |
| Labour hold | | Swing | | |

Leeds No. 10 Bramley
| Party | Candidate | Votes | % | ±% |
|---|---|---|---|---|
| Liberal | Michael J. Meadowcroft | 3,043 | 49.5 | |
| Labour | Frank H. Watson | 2,412 | 39.2 | |
| Conservative | L. Hargreaves | 691 | 11.2 | |
| Majority | | 631 | 10.3 | |
| Turnout | | 6,146 | 41.2 | |
| Liberal gain from Labour | | Swing | | |

Leeds No. 14 Burley
| Party | Candidate | Votes | % | ±% |
|---|---|---|---|---|
| Labour | Ken J. Patterson | 2,026 | 57.0 | |
| Liberal | David A. Gazey | 703 | 19.8 | |
| Conservative | H.B. Woodhead | 632 | 17.8 | |
| Ecology | R. Mitchell | 130 | 3.7 | |
| Communist | B. Jackson | 64 | 1.8 | |
| Majority | | 1,323 | 37.2 | |
| Turnout | | 3,555 | 37.6 | |
| Labour hold | | Swing | | |

Leeds No.3 Burmantofts and Richmond Hill
| Party | Candidate | Votes | % | ±% |
|---|---|---|---|---|
| Liberal | Margaret Grace Clay | 4,984 | 57.5 | |
| Labour | Pat J. Kelly | 3,007 | 34.7 | |
| Conservative | K. Robinson | 600 | 6.9 | |
| National Front | B. Wadsworth | 72 | 0.8 | |
| Communist | M. Monkman | 102 | 0.8 | |
| Majority | | 1,977 | 22.8 | |
| Turnout | | 5,624 | 44.5 | |
| Liberal gain from Labour | | Swing | | |

Leeds No. 4 Chapel Allerton and Scott Hall
| Party | Candidate | Votes | % | ±% |
|---|---|---|---|---|
| Labour | Robert Alexander Charles (aka Alec) Wilson | 4,028 | 57.5 | |
| Conservative | Richard M. Barker | 3,642 | 18.4 | |
| Liberal | T.W.J. Garbett | 1,106 | 12.3 | |
| Ecology | H.J. Terry | 163 | 1.8 | |
| Communist | Lynette Willoughby | 78 | 0.9 | |
| Majority | | 386 | 4.3 | |
| Turnout | | 9,017 | 40.4 | |
| Labour gain from Conservative | | Swing | | |

Leeds No. 5 City and Woodhouse
| Party | Candidate | Votes | % | ±% |
|---|---|---|---|---|
| Labour | Irene Ruby Levy | 2,346 | 57.5 | |
| Liberal | Elizabeth Bee | 751 | 18.4 | |
| Conservative | R. Simpson | 657 | 16.1 | |
| Ecology | Roger D Boyle | 175 | 4.3 | |
| Communist | J.M. Rodgers | 148 | 3.6 | |
| Majority | | 1,595 | 39.1 | |
| Turnout | | 4077 | 28.1 | |
| Labour hold | | Swing | | |

Leeds No. 6 Cookridge and Weetwood
| Party | Candidate | Votes | % | ±% |
|---|---|---|---|---|
| Conservative | Adrian J.A. Lodge | 5,346 | 52.5 | |
| Labour | Colin Burgon | 2,484 | 24.1 | |
| Liberal | Margaret Gardham | 2,032 | 20.0 | |
| Ecology | Claire Nash | 313 | 3.1 | |
| Majority | | 2,826 | 28.1 | |
| Turnout | | 10,175 | 36.8 | |
| Conservative hold | | Swing | | |

Garforth No. 1 North and Barwick
| Party | Candidate | Votes | % | ±% |
|---|---|---|---|---|
| Conservative | John Tweddle | 3,813 | 48.5 | |
| Labour | L. Graham | 2,891 | 36.7 | |
| Liberal | B. Hutchinson | 827 | 10.5 | |
| Ecology | D.T. Corry | 338 | 4.4 | |
| Majority | | 922 | 11.7 | |
| Turnout | | 7896 | 43.5 | |
| Conservative hold | | Swing | | |

Leeds No. 8 Gipton and Whinmoor
| Party | Candidate | Votes | % | ±% |
|---|---|---|---|---|
| Labour | J.D. Moynihan | 5,188 | 68.5 | |
| Conservative | J.C. Suttenstall | 1,521 | 20.1 | |
| Liberal | N.R. Mackie | 863 | 11.4 | |
| Majority | | 3,667 | 48.4 | |
| Turnout | | 7,572 | 31.2 | |
| Labour hold | | Swing | | |

Leeds No. 11 Halton
| Party | Candidate | Votes | % | ±% |
|---|---|---|---|---|
| Conservative | W.K. Hedley | 3,149 | 51.9 | |
| Labour | Annie Margaret McQueenie | 2,050 | 33.8 | |
| Liberal | Keith Cecil Norman | 869 | 14.3 | |
| Majority | | 1,099 | 18.1 | |
| Turnout | | 6,068 | 40.4 | |
| Conservative hold | | Swing | | |

Leeds No. 9 Harehills and Roundhay
| Party | Candidate | Votes | % | ±% |
|---|---|---|---|---|
| Labour | Maisie Maria Eade | 3,631 | 43.1 | |
| Conservative | Gilbert Raymond Lax | 3,491 | 41.5 | |
| Liberal | Patricia Jean Arnold | 1,078 | 12.8 | |
| Ecology | Penelope Jane Sanders | 219 | 2.6 | |
| Majority | | 140 | 1.7 | |
| Turnout | | 8,419 | 38.9 | |
| Labour gain from Conservative | | Swing | | |

Leeds No. 12 Headingley
| Party | Candidate | Votes | % | ±% |
|---|---|---|---|---|
| Labour | Harold Best | 2,828 | 46.5 | |
| Conservative | Alan Sydney Pedley | 2,007 | 33.0 | |
| Liberal | M.J. Hipshon | 890 | 14.6 | |
| Ecology | Christine Rushworth | 214 | 3.5 | |
| Communist | Barry Cooper | 139 | 2.3 | |
| Majority | | 821 | 13.5 | |
| Turnout | | 6,078 | 36.2 | |
| Labour gain from Conservative | | Swing | | |

Horsforth
| Party | Candidate | Votes | % | ±% |
|---|---|---|---|---|
| Liberal | J.P. Hopkinson | 3,275 | 47.5 | |
| Conservative | L.W. Robinson | 2,341 | 34.0 | |
| Labour | E. Barlow | 1,131 | 16.4 | |
| Ecology | R. Price | 147 | 2.1 | |
| Majority | | 934 | 13.5 | |
| Turnout | | 6894 | 41.6 | |
| Liberal gain from Conservative | | Swing | | |

Leeds No. 7 Hunslet East and West
| Party | Candidate | Votes | % | ±% |
|---|---|---|---|---|
| Labour | John Gunnell | 5,057 | 76.1 | |
| Liberal | M. Day | 1,066 | 16.0 | |
| Conservative | T.R. Davies | 449 | 6.8 | |
| National Front | E. Morrison | 72 | 1.1 | |
| Majority | | 3,991 | 60.1 | |
| Turnout | | 6,644 | 38.7 | |
| Labour hold | | Swing | | |

Garforth No. 2 Kippax and Swillington
| Party | Candidate | Votes | % | ±% |
|---|---|---|---|---|
| Labour | N. Cooper | 3,985 | 67.7 | |
| Conservative | A.C. Taylor | 1,289 | 21.9 | |
| Liberal | Diane Philipa Hadwin | 613 | 10.4 | |
| Majority | | 2,696 | 45.8 | |
| Turnout | | 5,887 | 41.6 | |
| Labour hold | | Swing | | |

Leeds No. 13 Kirkstall
| Party | Candidate | Votes | % | ±% |
|---|---|---|---|---|
| Labour | Brian Selby | 2,997 | 60.4 | |
| Conservative | Albert A. Walkington | 1,443 | 29.1 | |
| Liberal | J. Ackrill | 523 | 10.5 | |
| Majority | | 1,554 | 31.3 | |
| Turnout | | 4,963 | 40.6 | |
| Labour hold | | Swing | | |

Leeds No. 15 Middleton
| Party | Candidate | Votes | % | ±% |
|---|---|---|---|---|
| Labour | St John Binns | 3,405 | 77.9 | |
| Liberal | Shirley Ward | 534 | 12.2 | |
| Conservative | Anthony J. Larvin | 434 | 9.9 | |
| Majority | | 2,871 | 65.7 | |
| Turnout | | 4,327 | 31.6 | |
| Labour hold | | Swing | | |

Leeds No. 16 Moortown
| Party | Candidate | Votes | % | ±% |
|---|---|---|---|---|
| Conservative | Kenneth T Davison | 2,166 | 46.9 | |
| Labour | D.M. Winter | 1,583 | 34.3 | |
| Liberal | Rosemary Judith Clay | 696 | 15.1 | |
| Ecology | K.M. Rushworth | 170 | 3.7 | |
| Majority | | 583 | 12.6 | |
| Turnout | | 4,615 | 34.4 | |
| Conservative hold | | Swing | | |

Morley No. 1 North
| Party | Candidate | Votes | % | ±% |
|---|---|---|---|---|
| Labour | Linda Rose Middleton | 3,388 | 48.5 | |
| Conservative | G. Rogerson | 2,784 | 39.8 | |
| Liberal | Anne Kathryn Gilchrist | 818 | 11.7 | |
| Majority | | 604 | 8.6 | |
| Turnout | | 6,990 | 39.1 | |
| Labour gain from Conservative | | Swing | | |

Morley No. 2 South
| Party | Candidate | Votes | % | ±% |
|---|---|---|---|---|
| Labour | R. Darrington | 4,019 | 66.2 | |
| Conservative | S.D. Hodgson | 1,423 | 23.4 | |
| Liberal | Marrion Elisa Hirst | 631 | 10.4 | |
| Majority | | 2,596 | 42.7 | |
| Turnout | | 6,073 | 37.4 | |
| Labour hold | | Swing | | |

Leeds No. 17 Osmondthorpe
| Party | Candidate | Votes | % | ±% |
|---|---|---|---|---|
| Labour | John M. Sully | 2,909 | 68.7 | |
| Conservative | Jean Higham | 709 | 16.7 | |
| Liberal | Anne Weatherley | 619 | 14.6 | |
| Majority | | 2,200 | 51.9 | |
| Turnout | | 4,237 | 34.1 | |
| Labour hold | | Swing | | |

Otley
| Party | Candidate | Votes | % | ±% |
|---|---|---|---|---|
| Liberal | Barry Peters | 4,052 | 48.6 | |
| Conservative | Clive J. Fox | 3,112 | 37.4 | |
| Labour | Audrey Joyce Slee | 841 | 10.1 | |
| Ecology | A. Marriot | 215 | 2.6 | |
| SDP | G.J. Malcolm | 109 | 1.3 | |
| Majority | | 940 | 11.3 | |
| Turnout | | 8,329 | 55.2 | |
| Liberal gain from Conservative | | Swing | | |

Pudsey No. 1 North
| Party | Candidate | Votes | % | ±% |
|---|---|---|---|---|
| Conservative | Harry Gill | 2,743 | 40.3 | |
| Labour | Neil G. Rhodes | 2,602 | 38.3 | |
| Liberal | A.R. Booker | 1,332 | 19.6 | |
| Ecology | N. A. Strudwick | 123 | 1.8 | |
| Majority | | 141 | 2.1 | |
| Turnout | | 6,800 | 43.8 | |
| Conservative hold | | Swing | | |

Pudsey No. 2 South
| Party | Candidate | Votes | % | ±% |
|---|---|---|---|---|
| Labour | Andrew R Jarosz | 2,111 | 35.2 | |
| Conservative | C. Critchley | 2,014 | 33.5 | |
| Liberal | D.N. Collins | 1,879 | 31.3 | |
| Majority | | 97 | 1.6 | |
| Turnout | | 6,004 | 41.0 | |
| Labour hold | | Swing | | |

Rothwell
| Party | Candidate | Votes | % | ±% |
|---|---|---|---|---|
| Labour | W. H. Banks | 4,874 | 62.5 | |
| Conservative | D. Boynton | 1,665 | 21.4 | |
| Liberal | R.C James | 1,168 | 15.0 | |
| Communist | R Horsbrough | 90 | 1.2 | |
| Majority | | 3,209 | 41.2 | |
| Turnout | | 7,797 | 35.0 | |
| Labour hold | | Swing | | |

Leeds No. 18 Seacroft
| Party | Candidate | Votes | % | ±% |
|---|---|---|---|---|
| Labour | Len Hodgson | 3,450 | 73.6 | |
| Conservative | J.M. Suttenstall | 688 | 14.7 | |
| Liberal | A. Wood | 460 | 9.8 | |
| Communist | B.S. Wilson | 91 | 1.9 | |
| Majority | | 2,762 | 58.9 | |
| Turnout | | 4,689 | 30 | |
| Labour hold | | Swing | | |

Leeds No. 19 Stanningley
| Party | Candidate | Votes | % | ±% |
|---|---|---|---|---|
| Labour | Margaret Sarah Cliff | 2,763 | 61.0 | |
| Conservative | A. Holmes | 906 | 20.0 | |
| Liberal | S. J. Gillien | 863 | 19.0 | |
| Majority | | 1,857 | 41.0 | |
| Turnout | | 4,532 | 35.8 | |
| Labour hold | | Swing | | |

Leeds No. 20 Talbot
| Party | Candidate | Votes | % | ±% |
|---|---|---|---|---|
| Conservative | J. Bird | 2,622 | 52.1 | |
| Liberal | G. Macpherson | 1,128 | 22.4 | |
| Labour | J. W. Hall | 1,059 | 21.1 | |
| Ecology | S. Barnes | 219 | 4.4 | |
| Majority | | 1,494 | 29.7 | |
| Turnout | | 5,028 | 34.8 | |
| Conservative hold | | Swing | | |

Wetherby
| Party | Candidate | Votes | % | ±% |
|---|---|---|---|---|
| Conservative | Yvonne Brenda Garden | 5,504 | 67.4 | |
| Labour | I. K. Adams | 1,233 | 15.1 | |
| Liberal | June Cutliffe Scott | 942 | 11.5 | |
| Ecology | D. Rawson | 482 | 5.9 | |
| Majority | | 4,271 | 52.3 | |
| Turnout | | 8,161 | 37.1 | |
| Conservative hold | | Swing | | |

Leeds No. 21 Wortley
| Party | Candidate | Votes | % | ±% |
|---|---|---|---|---|
| Labour | C. Webster | 2,499 | 44.4 | |
| Conservative | Frank Stubley | 1,589 | 28.3 | |
| Liberal | W.T. Moss | 1,536 | 27.3 | |
| Majority | | 910 | 16.2 | |
| Turnout | | 5,624 | 38.9 | |
| Labour gain from Conservative | | Swing | | |

== Leeds Ward Casual Vacancies ==
Leeds No. 10 Bramley 8 Aug 1983
| Party | Candidate | Votes | % | ±% |
|---|---|---|---|---|
| Liberal | Margaret Jones | | | |
| Labour | | | | |
| Conservative | | | | |
| Majority | | 247 | | |
| Turnout | | | | |
| Liberal hold | | Swing | | |

Leeds No. 4 Chapel Allerton and Scott Hall 17 June 1984
| Party | Candidate | Votes | % | ±% |
|---|---|---|---|---|
| Labour | Marie Stinson | | | |
| Conservative | | | | |
| Alliance | | | | |
| Ecology | | | | |
| Majority | | | | |
| Turnout | | | | |
| Labour hold | | Swing | | |
