= 2010 Slough Borough Council election =

English local election

Results of the 2010 Slough Borough Council election

An election for the Borough Council in Slough, England, was held on 6 May 2010. This was the 124th Slough general local authority election (including both whole council elections and elections by thirds) since Slough became a local government unit in 1863.

The regular 2010 election was to fill thirteen seats, one from each ward except Colnbrook with Poyle, for the 2010–2014 term. These thirteen seats were last contested in the Council election of 2006.

The remaining twenty-seven Slough Councillors will continue in office, for seats which will be next contested in 2011 or 2012.

== Recent political history of Slough ==
Between 2004 and 2008, Slough council had no party in overall control. A coalition of the Britwellian, Independent, Liberal and Liberal Democrats Group (BILLD) and the Conservative Group formed a joint administration. In the 2008-2010 period the Labour Group had a majority and was in control of the council.

The BILLD Group is itself a local coalition, containing members from four parties or groups of independents. The organisations represented in the group, as at April 2010, were the Slough Liberal Democrats, the Slough Liberals, the Independent Britwellian Residents and Independents from Wexham Lea ward. The existing members of the Group have an electoral pact for the 2010 election, continuing electoral arrangements which started with the 2001 Slough Council election.

The Slough Party and a number of Independents, not affiliated with any of the three existing council groups, are also contesting the 2010 election.

At the time of the 2008 election there were twenty councillors each supporting the joint administration and the Labour opposition, with one vacancy. After the election count Labour secured four net gains, to give the party a 23:18 margin and a majority of five for the start of the 2008-2009 municipal year.

Shortly after the 2008 election, following some rapid defections and re-defections (see 2008 Slough Council election for additional details), a newly re-elected Labour Councillor (Pervez Choudhry who represents Central Ward) joined the Conservative Group. As a result, the Labour majority fell to three.

For the 2010-2011 municipal year, Councillor Choudhry was named as the Conservative group leader. The former Tory leader (Derek Cryer representing Langley St Mary's ward) left the Conservative council group, but remained a member of the Conservative Party.

	Party	Total Seats April 2010	Seats Up 2010	Seats Up 2011	Seats Up 2012	Candidates May 2010
	Labour	22	8	8	6	13
	Conservative	6	-	2	4	12
*	Liberal Democrats	3	1	1	1	4
*	Independent (BILLD	3	1	1	1	1
	Independent (Non BILLD)	-	-	-	-	7
*	Independent Britwellian Residents	3	1	1	1	1
*	Liberal	3	1	1	1	1
	The Slough Party	-	-	-	-	2
	Independent Conservative	1	1	-	-	-
	Total	41	13	14	14	41

== Election result 2010 ==
The plus/minus figure is the change in votes percentage from the 2008 Slough Council election.

Slough local election result 2010
Party	Seats	Gains	Losses	Net gain/loss	Seats %	Votes %	Votes	+/−
Conservative	2	2	-	+2	15.38	32.48	15,968	+6.65%
Labour	10	2	-	+2	76.92	45.87	22,550	+0.27%
Liberal Democrats	1	-	-	-	7.69	7.89	3,877	-4.10%
Independent	-	-	-	-	-	4.93	2,426	+1.13%
The Slough Party	-	-	-	-	-	2.70	1,329	-1.28%
Liberal	-	-	1	-1	-	2.11	1,038	-0.81%
Britwellian	-	-	1	-1	-	2.07	1,018	-0.29%
Independent	-	-	1	-1	-	1.95	960	+0.05%
Ind. Conservative	-	-	1	-1	-	-	-	-

Total valid votes: 49,166 Total spoilt votes: 509 Slough BC turnout:

New Council by group: Labour 24, BILLD 9 (Liberal Democrats 3, Independent 2, Independent Britwellian Residents 2, Liberal 2), Conservative 8. Total 41.

Labour majority: 7.

== Summary of Election results by party from 2004 ==
Election Results 2004-2010
Party	2004	2006	2007	2008	2010
Conservative	9	1 (5)	3 (7)	3 (6)	2 (8)
Labour	15	8 (18)	7 (19)	8 (23)	10 (24)
Liberal Democrats	6	1 (5)	1 (4)	1 (3)	1 (3)
Other parties	11	3 (13)	3 (11)	3 (9)	0 (6)
Total Seats	41	13 (41)	14 (41)	15 (41)	13 (41)

Note: The 2004 election was for the whole Council. Other elections are for a third of the Council. For them the overall totals, after the election, are given in brackets.

== List of Councillors whose terms expired in 2010 ==
Ward	Party	Elected	Incumbent	Cand.?	Re-elected?
Baylis & Stoke	Labour	2006	Azhar Qureshi	Yes	Yes
Britwell	Ind. Britwellian Res.	2006	John Joseph Finn *	Yes	No
Central	Labour	2006	Shafiq Ahmed Chaudhry	Yes	Yes
Chalvey	Labour	2006	Mohammed Rasib	Yes	Yes
Cippenham Green	Labour	2002	James Charles Robert Swindlehurst	Yes	Yes
Cippenham Meadows	Labour	2004	Nimrit Chohan	Yes	Yes
Farnham	Labour	2002	Sukhjit Kaur Dhaliwal	Yes	Yes
Foxborough	Liberal Democrats	2004	Robert Clive Plimmer *	Yes	Yes
Haymill	Liberal	2004	Brian Graham Lacey Hewitt *	Yes	No
Kedermister	Labour	2002	Christine Rita Small	Yes	Yes
Langley St Mary's	Independent Conservative	2000	Derek Ernest Cryer	No	N/A
Upton	Labour	2006	Balvinder Singh Bains	Yes	Yes
Wexham Lea	Independent	2004	Mohammed Latif Khan *	No	N/A

- * Member of the Britwellian, Independent, Liberal and Liberal Democrats Group (BILLD)

== Ward results ==
Candidates nominated for the 2010 election are named in this section, using the version of their name to be used on the ballot paper.

A candidate who was an incumbent Councillor for the ward being contested has an * following their name.

Figures for the total published electorate are given, at 1 March 2010. The number given is derived from the full register, not the edited register available to the general public. The spoilt votes and turnout figures were taken from the Slough Council website.

The change columns record alterations from the previous local election results.

Swing figures are only calculated when the same two parties shared the first two places in both the 2007 and 2008 elections. The swing given is two party or Butler swing, ignoring votes for other candidates. Swing is not calculated for Central Ward, for the same reasons why changes are not calculated. Contrary to the usual convention a positive swing figure is towards Labour and a negative swing towards Conservative (or other party as specified in the result).

Total eligible electorate for the Borough (including Colnbrook with Poyle): 88,967

=== Baylis and Stoke (2010: Labour hold) ===
Baylis and Stoke
Party	Candidate	Votes	%	±%
Labour	Azhar Qureshi *	2,071	49.25	−4.37
Liberal Democrats	Rashad Butt	1,082	25.73	−20.65
Conservative	Meeta Dhaliwal	1,052	25.02	N/A
Majority		989	23.52	+16.27
Turnout		4,205 (+48 spoilt)	56.2	+18.34
Labour hold		Swing		
Registered electors		7,281		

=== Britwell (2010: Labour gain from Independent Britwellian Residents) ===
Paul Janik is a former Independent Britwellian Residents Councillor for this ward, serving from 2003 to 2006.

Britwell
Party	Candidate	Votes	%	±%
Labour	Pavitar Kaur Mann	1,320	40.94	+12.81
Britwellian	John Finn *	1,018	31.58	−15.36
The Slough Party	Paul Janik	886	27.48	+2.55
Majority		302	9.37	N/A
Turnout		3,224 (+67 spoilt)	43.5	+16.87
Labour gain from Britwellian		Swing		
Registered electors		5,958		

=== Central (2008-2012 term: Labour gain from Conservative; 2008-2011 term: Labour gain from vacant) ===
As two seats were filled at the 2008 election, the bloc vote electoral system was used. Each elector was entitled to cast up to two votes. The candidate with most votes was elected to the four-year term and the one in second place was returned for three years.

Councillor Pervez Choudhry was an incumbent councillor for the Chalvey ward, at the time of the election. A.S. Dhaliwal had represented the ward from 2000 until the 2004 Slough Council election.

Central
Party	Candidate	Votes	%	±%
Labour	Shafiq Ahmed Chaudhry *	2659	63.3%	
Conservative	Muhammad Umar Majeed	1544	36.7%	
Turnout		4203	55.8%	
Registered electors		7,830		

=== Chalvey (2010: Labour gain from Conservative) ===
Chalvey
Party	Candidate	Votes	%	±%
Labour	Mohammed Rasib *	1877	56.1%	
Conservative	Shabir Khan	1469	43.9%	
Turnout		3346	49.4%	
Registered electors		6,786		

=== Cippenham Green (2010: Labour hold) ===
Cippenham Green
Party	Candidate	Votes	%	±%
Labour	James Charles Robert Swindlehurst *	1631	42.9%	
Conservative	Maurice Arthur Stanmore	1528	40.2%	
Independent	Geoff Howard	523	13.7%	
Independent	Kevin Christopher McCabe	122	3.2%	
Turnout		3804	62.1%	
Registered electors		6,256		

=== Cippenham Meadows (2010: Labour hold) ===
Cippenham Meadows
Party	Candidate	Votes	%	±%
Labour	Nimrit Chohan *	1771	43.0%	
Conservative	Amrik Singh Sihra	1380	33.5%	
Liberal Democrats	Gary James Griffin	965	23.4%	
Turnout		4116	60%	
Registered electors		6,987		

=== Colnbrook with Poyle (2008: Labour gain from Conservative) ===
This ward has no election in 2010. The total published electorate, at 1 March 2010, was 3,893.

Councillor Smith was, at the time of the 2008 election, the leader of the Conservative group on Slough Council.

=== Farnham (2010: Labour hold) ===
Councillor Anderson was the leader of the Labour group on Slough Council. Sumander Khan represented Central ward from 2004 to 2006.

Farnham
Party	Candidate	Votes	%	±%
Labour	Sukhjit Kaur Dhaliwal *	2154	58.4%	
Conservative	Sumander Khan	1093	29.6%	
The Slough Party	Tristan Nicholas Miles	443	12.0%	
Turnout		3690	55.6%	
Registered electors		6,652		

=== Foxborough (2010: Liberal Democrats hold) ===
Foxborough
Party	Candidate	Votes	%	±%
Liberal Democrats	Robert Plimmer *	1249	37.4%	
Labour	Ted Plenty	1170	35.1%	
Conservative	Karanjit Singh Aulakh	919	27.5%	
Turnout		3338	62.3%	
Registered electors		5,341		

=== Haymill (2010: Conservative gain from Liberal) ===
Haymill
Party	Candidate	Votes	%	±%
Conservative	Anna Sylwia Wright *	1618	39.7%	
Labour	Martin Frank Carter	1420	34.8%	
Liberal	Brian Graham Lacey Hewitt	1038	25.5%	
Turnout		4076	60.3%	
Registered electors		6,840		

=== Kedermister (2010: Labour hold) ===
Kedermister
Party	Candidate	Votes	%	±%
Labour	Christine Rita Small *	1660	43.0%	
Conservative	Gurdeep Singh Grewal	1501	38.9%	
Liberal Democrats	Josephine Mary Hanney	581	15.0%	
Independent	Steven Clottey	119	3.1%	
Turnout		3861	59.6%	
Registered electors		6,557		

=== Langley St Mary's (2010: Conservative hold) ===
Langley St Mary's
Party	Candidate	Votes	%	±%
Conservative	Frank Abe *	1647	46.3%	
Labour	Harjinder Kaur Minhas	1522	42.8%	
Independent	Angela Joyce Schofield	386	10.9%	
Turnout		3555	64.8%	
Registered electors		5,629		

=== Upton (2010: Labour gain from Conservative) ===
Upton
Party	Candidate	Votes	%	±%
Labour	Balvinder Singh Bains *	1449	40.2%	
Conservative	Wal Chahal	1390	38.5%	
Independent	Subhash Chandar Mohindra	404	11.2%	
Independent	Tom King	364	10.1%	
Turnout		3607	62.6%	
Registered electors				

=== Wexham Lea (2010) ===
Wexham Lea
Party	Candidate	Votes	%	±%
Labour	Paul Sohal	1846	44.6%	
Independent	Sarfraz Khan	960	23.2%	
Conservative	Harjinder Singh Gahir	827	20.0%	
Independent	Ken Wright	508	12.3%	
Turnout		4141	58.7%	
Registered electors		7,029		

== Members of Slough Borough Council May 2010 ==
Ward	Party	Elected	Term	Councillor
Baylis & Stoke	Labour	2008	2012	Natasa Pantelic
Baylis & Stoke	Labour	2007	2011	Faza Ahmed Matloob
Baylis & Stoke	Labour	2006	2014	Azhar Qureshi
Britwell	Ind. Britwellian Res.	2002	2012	Sean Patrick Wright *
Britwell	Ind. Britwellian Res.	2002	2011	Patrick Shine *
Britwell	Labour	2010	2014	Pavitar Kaur Mann
Central	Conservative	2002	2012	Pervez Choudhry (k)
Central	Labour	2008	2011	Arvind Singh Dhaliwal (a)
Central	Labour	2006	2014	Shafiq Ahmed Chaudhry
Chalvey	Conservative	2008	2012	Mohammad Basharat
Chalvey	Labour	2001	2011	Raja Mohammad Zarait
Chalvey	Labour	2006	2014	Mohammed Rasib (l)
Cippenham Green	Labour	2008	2012	Roger Francis Davis
Cippenham Green	Labour	2007	2011	Patricia Josephine O'Connor
Cippenham Green	Labour	2002	2014	James Charles Robert Swindlehurst
Cippenham Meadows	Labour	2003	2012	May Dodds
Cippenham Meadows	Labour	2001	2011	Sat Pal Singh Parmar (b)
Cippenham Meadows	Labour	2004	2014	Nimrit Chohan
Colnbrook with Poyle	Labour	2008	2012	James Lawrence Walsh
Colnbrook with Poyle	Labour	2007	2011	Rakesh Pabbi
Farnham	Labour	1997	2012	Robert Anderson
Farnham	Labour	2001	2011	Joginder Singh Bal
Farnham	Labour	2002	2014	Sukhjit Kaur Dhaliwal (l)
Foxborough	Liberal Democrats	2008	2012	Duncan Peter Buchanan * (c)
Foxborough	Liberal Democrats	2004	2011	Sonja Anne Jenkins *
Foxborough	Liberal Democrats	2004	2014	Robert Clive Plimmer *
Haymill	Liberal	1987	2012	Richard Stanley Stokes * (d)
Haymill	Liberal	1990	2011	David John Munkley *
Haymill	Conservative	2010	2014	Anna Sylwia Wright
Kedermister	Labour	2002	2012	Jagjit Singh Grewal
Kedermister	Labour	1988	2011	Mewa Singh Mann
Kedermister	Labour	2002	2014	Christine Rita Small
Langley St Mary's	Conservative	2008	2012	Peter Dale-Gough
Langley St Mary's	Conservative	2006	2011	Diana Victoria Coad
Langley St Mary's	Conservative	2010	2014	Frank Abe
Upton	Conservative	1999	2012	Julia Thomson Long (f)
Upton	Conservative	2004	2011	Balwinder Singh Dhillon (g)
Upton	Labour	2006	2014	Balvinder Singh Bains (h)
Wexham Lea	Independent	2000	2012	Michael Anthony Haines * (i)
Wexham Lea	Independent	2002	2011	David Ian MacIsaac *
Wexham Lea	Labour	2010	2014	Paul Sohal

Notes:-

- * Member of the Britwellian, Independent, Liberal and Liberal Democrats Group (BILLD)
- (a) A.S. Dhaliwal: Formerly served 2000-2004
- (b) Parmar: Formerly served 1995-2000
- (c) Buchanan: Formerly served 2004-2006
- (d) Stokes: Formerly a Labour Councillor 1983-1986
- (f) Long: Formerly served 1983-1990
- (g) Dhillon: Formerly Conservative 2004 and Independent Conservative 2004–2007.
- (h) Bains: Formerly served 2003-2004
- (i) Haines: Formerly a Labour Councillor 1987-1991 and 1992–1998
- (k) Choudry: Defected from Labour to Conservative on 12 May 2008, after the election.
- (l) S.K. Dhaliwal, Rasib: Defected from Labour to Conservative on 13 May 2008, and re-defected back to Labour later the same day.

== See also ==
- Slough
- Slough local elections
- Slough Borough Council
- Slough (UK Parliament constituency)
