= Slough Borough Council elections =

Local government elections in Berkshire, England

Slough Borough Council is the local authority for Slough, a unitary authority in Berkshire, England.

== Council elections ==
Composition of the council
Year	Conservative	Labour	Liberal Democrats (Note: Includes totals for the predecessors of the Liberal Democrats, the Liberal Party and SDP (both of which participated in the Alliance).)	UKIP	Independents & Others	Council control after election
Local government reorganisation; council established (40 seats)
1973	2	34	4	–	0	Labour
1976	27	11	2	–	0	Conservative
1979	21	14	5	–	0	Conservative
New ward boundaries (39 seats)
1983	15	21	3	–	0	Labour
1984	15	21	3	–	0	Labour
1986	12	24	3	–	0	Labour
1987	11	24	3	–	0	Labour
1988	8	26	5	–	0	Labour
1990	6	28	5	–	0	Labour
1991	4	30	5	–	0	Labour
1992	5	29	5	–	0	Labour
1994	4	28	0	0	7	Labour
1995	3	30	1	0	6	Labour
1996	0	36	3	0	1	Labour
Slough becomes a unitary authority; new ward boundaries (41 seats)
1997	4	34	3	0	0	Labour
1999	6	32	0	0	3	Labour
2000	7	27	1	0	6	Labour
2001	8	26	1	0	6	Labour
2002	6	27	2	0	6	Labour
2003	6	26	2	0	7	Labour
New ward boundaries (41 seats)
2004	9	15	6	0	11 (Note: Including 3 Liberals.)	No overall control
2006	6	18	5	0	11	No overall control
2007	7	19	4	0	11	No overall control
2008	6	23	3	0	9	No overall control
2010	8	24	3	0	6 (Note: Including 2 Liberal.)	Labour
2011	9	27	2	0	3 (Note: Including 1 Liberal.)	Labour
2012	5	35	1	0	0	Labour
New ward boundaries (42 seats)
2014	8	33	0	1	0	Labour
2015	9	32	0	0	1	Labour
2016	8	33	0	0	1	Labour
2018	6	35	0	0	1	Labour
2019	4	37	0	0	0	Labour
2021	5	34	0	0	3	Labour
2022	6	33	0	0	3	Labour
New ward boundaries (42 seats) (Note: Change from staggered to whole council elections)
2023	21	18	3	0	0	No overall control

== Borough result maps ==
2004 results map

2006 results map

2007 results map

2008 results map

2010 results map

2011 results map

2012 results map

2014 results map

2015 results map

2016 results map

2018 results map

2019 results map

2021 results map

2022 results map

2023 results map

== By-election results ==
=== 1994-1998 ===
Kedermister By-Election 7 December 1997
Party	Candidate	Votes	%	±%
Labour	D.A. Hewitt	442	60.22	N/A
Conservative	Mrs M.E. Collins	206	28.07	N/A
Liberal Democrats	P.L. Bayliss	86	11.72	N/A
Majority		236	32.15	N/A
Turnout		4,858	15.11	N/A
Labour hold		Swing	N/A	

Resignation of Mrs B. L. Lopez (Labour).

=== 1998-2002 ===
Upton By-Election 4 February 1999
Party	Candidate	Votes	%	±%
Conservative	Mrs J.T. Long	799	59.85	N/A
Labour	B.B. Mittal	352	26.37	N/A
Liberal Democrats	Mrs S.A. Jenkins	68	5.09	N/A
	P.P. Whitmore	60	4.49	N/A
Independent Labour	D.A.J. Alford	36	2.70	N/A
Liberal	P.E. Bradshaw	20	1.50	N/A
Majority		447	33.48	N/A
Turnout		4,931	27.07	N/A
Conservative hold		Swing	N/A	

Death of M. G. Long (Conservative).

=== 2002-2006 ===
Britwell By-Election 18 October 2002
Party	Candidate	Votes	%	±%
Britwellian	Patrick Shine	488	53.80	N/A
Labour	Ms May Dodds	262	28.89	N/A
Britwellian	O. Isemia	157	24.92	N/A
Majority		226	32.15	N/A
Turnout		6,376	14.26	N/A
Britwellian gain from Britwellian		Swing	N/A	

Death of Mrs Mavis L. Gallick (Britwellian).

Britwell By-Election 13 February 2003
Party	Candidate	Votes	%	±%
Britwellian	Paul Janik	539	63.49	+9.69
Labour	Ms J.R. Rock	310	36.51	+7.62
Majority		229	26.97	−5.18
Turnout		6,319	13.50	−0.76
Britwellian gain from Labour		Swing	N/A	

Death of Dennis McCarthy (Labour).

=== 2006-2010 ===
Langley St. Mary's By-Election 16 November 2006
Party	Candidate	Votes	%	±%
Conservative	Diana Victoria Coad	805	50.50	+13.79
Labour	Sharanjeet Kaur Sandhu	682	42.79	+6.42
Independent	Dominic James Ashford	107	6.71	+0.72
Majority		123	7.72	+7.37
Turnout		...	29.97	−8.49
Conservative gain from Ind. Langley Res.		Swing	N/A	

Resignation of Mrs P. F. Key (Independent Langley Residents).

=== 2010-2014 ===
Baylis and Stoke By-Election 8 March 2012
Party	Candidate	Votes	%	±%
Labour	Mohammed Nazir	1,300	59.0	−21.4
Independent	Pervez Choudhury	764	34.7	+34.7
UKIP	Allan Deverill	72	3.3	+3.3
Independent	Ivan Dukes	68	3.1	+3.1
Majority		536	24.3	
Turnout		2,204		
Labour hold		Swing		

Disqualification of Azhar Qureshi (Labour) for non-attendance.

=== 2014-2018 ===
Haymill and Lynch Hill By-Election 4 May 2017
Party	Candidate	Votes	%	±%
Conservative	Paul Kelly	1,036	49.0	+3.6
Labour	Jemma Davis	899	42.5	+4.7
Liberal Democrats	Gary Griffin	129	6.1	+6.1
Independent	Paul Janik	52	2.5	+2.5
Majority		137	6.5	
Turnout		2,116		
Conservative hold		Swing		

Death of Darren Morris (Conservative).

=== 2023-2027 ===
Cippenham Green By-Election 11 June 2026
Party	Candidate	Votes	%	±%
Green	Chloe Hart	409	24.4	New
Conservative	Raja Muhammad Fayyaz	404	24.1	−24.7
Labour Co-op	Preston Brooker	355	21.2	−7.4
Reform	Christina Mahboob	326	19.4	New
Liberal Democrats	Jen Simpson	176	10.5	−0.2
Majority		5	0.3	N/A
Turnout		1,678	32.13	−4.34
Green gain from Conservative		Swing	N/A	

Resignation of Robert Stedmond (Conservative).
