= 2008 Slough Borough Council election =

2008 UK local government election

Results of the 2008 Slough Borough Council election

Elections to the Borough Council in Slough, England, were held on 1 May 2008. This was the 123rd Slough general local authority election (including both whole council elections and elections by thirds) since Slough became a local government unit in 1863.

The regular 2008 election was to fill fourteen seats, one from each ward, for the 2008–2012 term. These fourteen seats were last contested in the whole Council election of 2004, following the redrawing of the ward boundaries in the Borough.

The election also filled a casual vacancy, for the remaining three years of a 2007–2011 term. The vacancy was caused when Eshaq Khan (Conservative-Central ward) was removed from office, on 18 March 2008, following the hearing of an election petition (for more details see the external link to the judgment of the Election Commissioner below).

The remaining twenty-six Slough Councillors will continue in office, for seats which will be next contested in 2010 or 2011.

In an election where, in most parts of England, the Labour Party did badly; in Slough they regained control of the Council for the first time since 2004. Labour gained two seats from the Conservatives (and arguably a third by taking the vacant seat, last held by Eshaq Khan), one seat from the Liberal Democrats and one seat from the UK Independence Party. The Tories offset their losses by gaining one seat from Labour and another from The Slough Party. As a result of these changes the Council then had 23 Labour members and 18 opposition councillors.

Dissension within the Labour Party, within a few weeks of the election, led to three councillors defecting to the Conservative Party; producing a 21 non-Labour and 20 Labour split on the Council. Two of them returned to Labour later the same day, again reversing control of the Council.

== Recent political history of Slough ==
Slough has an unusual balance of political forces. The council, between 2004 and 2008, had no party in overall control. A coalition of the Britwellian, Independent, Liberal and Liberal Democrats Group (BILLD) and the Conservative Group formed a coalition administration. In the 2007–2008 municipal year the Labour Group and the one councillor of The Slough Party were in opposition.

The BILLD Group is itself a local coalition, before the 2008 election containing members from five parties or groups of independents. The organisations represented in the group, as at April 2008, were the Slough Liberal Democrats, the Slough Liberals, the United Kingdom Independence Party (UKIP), the Independent Britwellian Residents and Independents from Wexham Lea ward. The existing members of the Group had an electoral pact for the 2008 election, continuing electoral arrangements which started with the 2001 Slough Council election.

The Slough Party and a number of Independents, not affiliated to the BILLD group or the coalition administration, also contested the 2008 election.

In the previous election, in 2007, the Labour Party gained one seat from the Conservatives and one from the Liberal Democrats. However the Conservative Party defeated the then longest serving Labour Councillor and former Mayor, Lydia Simmons. This return was subsequently found, by an Election Commissioner, to have been obtained by corrupt and illegal means. Labour finished the 2007 count with a net gain of one, which left Slough Council still in a state of no overall control. The existing coalition administration (supported by all Councillors not in the Labour group, except for one) continued in office for the 2007–2008 municipal year.

During 2007–2008 the Conservative Party lost one seat following the hearing of an election petition. The casual vacancy, caused by the removal from office of former Councillor Eshaq Khan (Conservative-Central ward), was filled at the May election.

At the time of the 2008 election there were twenty councillors each supporting the administration and the opposition, with one vacancy. A single net gain by the opposition parties would have probably resulted in a change of administration. Two net gains for the Labour Party would ensure the first single party majority administration since the party lost control in 2004.

After the election count Labour secured four net gains, to give the party a 23:18 margin and a majority of five for the start of the 2008–2009 municipal year.

	Party	Seats April 2008	Seats Up	Candidates May 2008
	Labour	19	4	15
	Conservative	6	3	9
*	Liberal Democrats	4	2	7
*	Independent (BILLD	3	1	1
	Independent (Non BILLD)	–	–	4
*	Independent Britwellian Residents	3	1	1
*	Liberal	3	1	1
	The Slough Party	1	1	4
*	UK Independence	1	1	1
	vacant	1	1	–
	Total	41	15	43

- * Member of the Britwellian, Independent, Liberal and Liberal Democrats Group (BILLD)

=== Election result 2008 ===
The change in Conservative representation is calculated on the basis of the outcome of the 2007 count, without regard to the subsequent election petition.

The plus/minus figure is the change in votes percentage from the 2007 Slough Council election.

Slough local election result 2008
Party	Seats	Gains	Losses	Net gain/loss	Seats %	Votes %	Votes	+/−
Conservative	3	2	3	-1	20.00	25.83	7,276	-3.07%
Labour	8	5	1	+4	53.34	45.60	13,640	+2.15%
Liberal Democrats	1	–	1	-1	6.67	11.99	3,585	-0.80%
Independent	1	–	–	–	6.67	3.80	1,137	-1.13%
Independent	0	–	–	–	–	1.91	572	+0.67%
Britwellian	1	–	–	–	6.67	2.36	706	+0.55%
Liberal	1	–	–	–	6.67	2.92	873	-0.01%
The Slough Party	0	–	1	-1	–	3.98	1,190	+0.03%
UKIP	0	–	1	-1	–	1.61	481	n/a

Total valid votes: 29,910 Total spoilt votes: 182 Slough BC turnout: 32.93%

New Council by group: Labour 23, BILLD 12 (Independent 3, Independent Britwellian Residents 3, Liberal 3, Liberal Democrats 3), Conservative 6. Total 41.

Labour majority: 5.

=== Changes after the election ===
The Labour Party officially decided to nominate Raja Mohammaed Zarait (Chalvey) for Mayor, Joginder Singh Bal (Farnham) for Deputy Mayor, Robert Anderson (Farnham) for Leader of the Council and James Swindlehurst (Cippenham Green) for Deputy Leader of the Council. These nominations were due to be confirmed at the Annual Meeting of the Council on 15 May 2008.

Pervez Choudhry, elected as a Labour Councillor for Central on 1 May 2008, claimed that 15 of the then 23 Labour Councillors had wanted him as leader. Councillor Diana Coad (Conservative-Langley St Mary's) announced, on 12 May 2008, that Choudhry and an unspecified number of other ex-Labour councillors would enable the Conservative-BILLD coalition to remain in control. Slough and Langley Observer on-line, recovered 12 May 2008 Windsor Express on-line, recovered 12 May 2008

On 13 May 2008 the Conservatives announced that two more Labour Councillors had defected to them, reducing the Labour group to 20 members and giving the 21 non-Labour Councillors the chance to control the Council. The new defecting Councillors were Sukhjit Dhaliwal (Farnham) and Mohammed Rasib (Chalvey). Slough Observer on-line, recovered 13 May 2008

Later, on 13 May 2008, the Labour Party announced that the two Councillors were no longer leaving, so the balance on the Council would be 22-19 in favour of Labour. The Labour Party Chairman was quoted as saying "There was an internal misunderstanding and certain people tried to exploit that. Once it is all over they party needs to look at what happened and how it can be rectified for the future." Slough Observer on-line, recovered 13 May 2008

On 15 May 2008 the Labour nominees for Mayor, Deputy Mayor, Leader of the Council (and Labour group) and Deputy Leader were installed in office. The Leader of the Opposition (and BILLD group leader) is Robert Plimmer (Liberal Democrat-Foxborough) and the leader of the Conservative group is Derek Cryer (Conservative-Langley St Mary's).

== Summary of Election results by party from 2004 ==
Election Results 2004–2007
Party	2004	2006	2007	2008
Conservative	9	1 (5)	3 (7)	3 (6)
Labour	15	8 (18)	7 (19)	8 (23)
Liberal Democrats	6	1 (5)	1 (4)	1 (3)
Other parties	11	3 (13)	3 (11)	3 (9)
Total Seats	41	13 (41)	14 (41)	15 (41)

Note: The 2004 election was for the whole Council. Other elections are for a third of the Council. For them the overall totals, after the election, are given in brackets.

== List of Councillors whose terms expired in 2008 ==
Ward	Party	Elected	Incumbent	Cand.?	Re-elected?
Baylis & Stoke	Liberal Democrats	2004	Rashad Javaid Butt *	No	N/A
Britwell	Ind. Britwellian Res.	2002	Sean Patrick Wright *	Yes	Yes
Central	Conservative	2004	Mohammed Aziz	Yes	No
Chalvey	Labour	2002	Pervez Choudhry	Yes (Central)	Yes (Central)
Cippenham Green	UK Independence	1995	William Geoffrey Howard *	Yes	No
Cippenham Meadows	Labour	2003	May Dodds	Yes	Yes
Colnbrook with Poyle	Conservative	2000	Dexter Jerome Smith	Yes	No
Farnham	Labour	1997	Robert Anderson	Yes	Yes
Foxborough	Liberal Democrats	2000	John William Edwards *	No	N/A
Haymill	Liberal	1987	Richard Stanley Stokes *	Yes	Yes
Kedermister	Labour	2002	Jagjit Singh Grewal	Yes	Yes
Langley St Mary's	The Slough Party	2004	Neil James Arnold	Yes	No
Upton	Conservative	1999	Julia Thomson Long	Yes	Yes
Wexham Lea	Independent	2000	Michael Anthony Haines *	Yes	Yes

- * Member of the Britwellian, Independent, Liberal and Liberal Democrats Group (BILLD)

== Ward results ==
A candidate who was an incumbent Councillor for the ward being contested has an * following their name. An incumbent Councillor for another ward, has a + following the name.

Figures for the eligible electorate are given as at 3 March 2008. The Returning Officer has confirmed that the number of electors for each Ward has to be based on the current Register, plus any alterations made up to 3 March. The number given is derived from the full register, not the edited register available to the general public. The spoilt votes and turnout figures are taken from the Slough Council website.

The maximum election expenses for a candidate are calculated on the basis of £600 plus 5 pence for every entry in the register (as first published).

The change columns record alterations from the 2007 results. In Central Ward, where there were two seats up this year and only one last year, no attempt is made to calculate changes in party vote share. The problems with vote fraud in 2007 would, in any event, make any figures for changes in that ward largely meaningless.

Swing figures are only calculated when the same two parties shared the first two places in both the 2007 and 2008 elections. The swing given is two party or Butler swing, ignoring votes for other candidates. Swing is not calculated for Central Ward, for the same reasons why changes are not calculated. Contrary to the usual convention a positive swing figure is towards Labour and a negative swing towards Conservative (or other party as specified in the result).

Total eligible electorate for the Borough: 82,724

=== Baylis and Stoke (Labour gain from Liberal Democrats) ===
Baylis and Stoke 2008
Party	Candidate	Votes	%	±%
Labour	Natasa Pantelic	1,413	53.62	+1.47
Liberal Democrats	Sarfraz Khan	1,222	46.38	+9.35
Majority		191	7.25	−7.87
Turnout		2,662 (27 spoilt)	37.86	+0.29
Labour gain from Liberal Democrats		Swing	-4.85 (LD to Lab)	
Registered electors		6,737		

=== Britwell (Independent Britwellian Residents hold) ===
Paul Janik is a former Independent Britwellian Residents Councillor for this ward, serving from 2003 to 2006.

Britwell 2008
Party	Candidate	Votes	%	±%
Britwellian	Sean Patrick Wright *	706	46.94	+11.96
Labour	Olly Isernia	423	28.13	−0.25
The Slough Party	Paul Janik	375	24.93	+2.28
Majority		283	18.82	+12.22
Turnout		1,513 (9 spoilt)	26.63	−0.50
Britwellian hold		Swing	-7.33 (IBR to Lab)	
Registered electors		5,609		

=== Central (2008–2012 term: Labour gain from Conservative; 2008–2011 term: Labour gain from vacant) ===
As two seats were filled at the election, the bloc vote electoral system was used. Each elector was entitled to cast up to two votes. The candidate with most votes was elected to the four-year term and the one in second place was returned for three years.

A local newspaper (the Slough Observer) reported, in its edition of 18 April 2008, that Councillor Aziz (the current Deputy Mayor of Slough) had appeared at Slough Magistrates Court facing charges related to the election fraud scandal at last year's Central ward election. The councillor was suspended from the Conservative Party on Thursday 17 April 2008. As it was too late for a nominated candidate to withdraw from this year's election, Councillor Aziz will remain on the ballot as an official Conservative candidate. Former Councillor Eshaq Khan, one of the other defendants in the criminal case, had been expelled from the Conservative Party following the recent election court hearing.

Councillor Pervez Choudhry was an incumbent councillor for the Chalvey ward, at the time of the election. A.S. Dhaliwal had represented the ward from 2000 until the 2004 Slough Council election.

Central 2008 (2 seats)
Party	Candidate	Votes	%	±%
Labour	Pervez Choudhry +	1,214	25.01	N/A
Labour	Arvind Singh Dhaliwal	1,173	24.17	N/A
Conservative	Mohammed Aziz *	1,037	21.36	N/A
Conservative	Muhammad Umar Majeed	947	19.51	N/A
Liberal Democrats	Gary James Griffin	272	5.71	N/A
Liberal Democrats	Tejinder Dhaliwal	206	4.24	N/A
Turnout		4,865 (16 spoilt)	36.77	−5.45
Registered electors		6,941		

=== Chalvey (Conservative gain from Labour) ===
Chalvey 2008
Party	Candidate	Votes	%	±%
Conservative	Mohammad Basharat	1,008	50.99	+13.55
Labour	Karen Ann Lisa Muhammad	969	49.01	−1.27
Majority		39	1.97	N/A
Turnout		2,002 (25 spoilt)	33.31	−3.53
Conservative gain from Labour		Swing	-8.30	
Registered electors		5,801		

=== Cippenham Green (Labour gain from UK Independence Party) ===
Geoff Howard is a former Slough Councillor for the Labour Party and then the Conservative Party. He ultimately joined UKIP in 2004, shortly before the parliamentary election of 2005 at which he contested the Slough seat for his new party. He was seeking re-election to the council seat which he last won as a Conservative candidate in 2004.

Cippenham Green 2008
Party	Candidate	Votes	%	±%
Labour	Roger Francis Davis	1,010	56.87	+5.26
UKIP	Geoff Howard *	481	27.08	N/A
The Slough Party	Derek Henry Canziani	159	8.95	N/A
Independent	Kenneth Wright	126	7.09	N/A
Majority		529	29.79	+17.13
Turnout		1,795 (19 spoilt)	30.20	−3.59
Labour gain from UKIP		Swing	N/A	
Registered electors		5,916		

=== Cippenham Meadows (Labour hold) ===
Kevin Pond is a former councillor, representing Upton ward between 2004 and 2006. He was nominated shortly before the close of nominations when the previous Conservative candidate proved to be ineligible.

Cippenham Meadows 2008
Party	Candidate	Votes	%	±%
Labour	May Dodds *	974	55.34	−0.58
Conservative	Kevin Charles Pond	617	35.06	+1.01
Liberal Democrats	Nadeem Anwar Rana	169	9.60	−0.43
Majority		357	20.28	−1.59
Turnout		1,764 (4 spoilt)	26.17	−4.22
Labour hold		Swing	-0.93	
Registered electors		6,641		

=== Colnbrook with Poyle (Labour gain from Conservative) ===
Councillor Smith was, at the time of the election, the leader of the Conservative group on Slough Council.

Colnbrook with Poyle 2008
Party	Candidate	Votes	%	±%
Labour	James Lawrence Walsh	699	50.00	−0.62
Conservative	Dexter Smith *	640	45.78	+17.66
Independent	Kevin Christopher McCabe	59	4.22	N/A
Majority		59	4.22	−18.29
Turnout		1,402 (4 spoilt)	34.97	+1.84
Labour gain from Conservative		Swing	-12.09	
Registered electors		3,842		

=== Farnham (Labour hold) ===
Councillor Anderson was the leader of the Labour group on Slough Council. Sumander Khan represented Central ward from 2004 to 2006.

Farnham 2008
Party	Candidate	Votes	%	±%
Labour	Robert Anderson *	1,279	64.92	+13.40
Conservative	Sumander Khan	456	23.15	−8.74
Liberal Democrats	Josephine Mary Hanney	235	11.93	−4.66
Majority		823	41.78	+22.15
Turnout		1,980 (10 spoilt)	32.08	−0.47
Labour hold		Swing	11.95	
Registered electors		6,072		

=== Foxborough (Liberal Democrats hold) ===
Duncan Buchanan served as a Councillor from Baylis & Stoke ward from 2004 to 2006.

Foxborough 2008
Party	Candidate	Votes	%	±%
Liberal Democrats	Duncan Peter Buchanan	1,204	70.45	+17.17
Labour	Rani Bains	505	29.55	−13.34
Majority		699	40.90	+30.51
Turnout		1,728 (19 spoilt)	32.17	−6.30
Liberal Democrats hold		Swing	-15.05 (LD to Lab)	
Registered electors		5,332		

=== Haymill (Liberal hold) ===
Councillor Stokes was the Leader of the Council (2004–2008) and of the BILLD group.

Haymill 2008
Party	Candidate	Votes	%	±%
Liberal	Richard Stanley Stokes *	873	51.78	+6.63
Labour	Martin Frank Carter	597	35.41	+4.62
Independent	Liam Thomas Roche	216	12.81	+8.84
Majority		276	16.37	+2.02
Turnout		1,704 (18 spoilt)	26.10	−3.24
Liberal hold		Swing	0.07 (Lib to Lab)	
Registered electors		6,431		

=== Kedermister (Labour hold) ===
Kedermister 2008
Party	Candidate	Votes	%	±%
Labour	Jagjit Singh Grewal *	1,028	44.93	+1.06
Conservative	Wal Chahal	988	43.18	+3.07
Liberal Democrats	Helen Edwards	272	11.89	−2.59
Majority		40	1.75	−2.01
Turnout		2,293 (5 spoilt)	37.70	+0.85
Labour hold		Swing	-1.25	
Registered electors		5,962		

=== Langley St Mary's (Conservative gain from The Slough Party) ===
Neil Arnold was elected in 2004 as an Independent Langley Residents candidate. He supported the coalition administration until he joined The Slough Party around the time of the 2007 council election.

Peter Dale-Gough is the husband of Diana Coad, another Councillor from this ward.

Langley St Mary's 2008
Party	Candidate	Votes	%	±%
Conservative	Peter Dale-Gough	899	43.16	−7.09
Labour	Rajinder Singh Sandhu	656	31.49	+7.66
The Slough Party	Neil James Arnold *	528	25.35	−0.57
Majority		243	11.67	−12.66
Turnout		2,085 (2 spoilt)	37.42	+3.79
Conservative gain from The Slough Party		Swing	N/A	
Registered electors		5,459		

=== Upton (Conservative hold) ===
Julia Long is a former Mayor of Slough from 2004–2005

Upton 2008
Party	Candidate	Votes	%	±%
Conservative	Julia Thomson Long *	1,134	57.13	+8.82
Labour	Gurminder Singh Sall	723	36.42	+1.67
The Slough Party	Mervyn Alphonso Williams	128	6.45	N/A
Majority		411	20.71	+7.15
Turnout		1,994 (9 spoilt)	34.50	−5.03
Conservative hold		Swing	-2.90	
Registered electors		5,694		

=== Wexham Lea (Independent hold) ===
Councillor Haines is a member of the BILLD group and a supporter of the former (2004–2008) coalition administration.

Wexham Lea
Party	Candidate	Votes	%	±%
Independent	Tony Haines *	1,137	49.76	−7.80
Labour	Mohammed Shabir Khan	977	42.76	+0.32
Independent	Alan James Griffith	171	7.45	N/A
Majority		160	7.00	−8.11
Turnout		2,300 (15 spoilt)	35.20	−3.76
Independent hold		Swing	3.77(Ind to Lab)	
Registered electors		6,287		

== Members of Slough Borough Council May 2008 ==
Ward	Party	Elected	Term	Councillor
Baylis & Stoke	Labour	2008	2012	Natasa Pantelic
Baylis & Stoke	Labour	2007	2011	Faza Ahmed Matloob
Baylis & Stoke	Labour	2006	2010	Azhar Qureshi
Britwell	Ind. Britwellian Res.	2002	2012	Sean Patrick Wright *
Britwell	Ind. Britwellian Res.	2002	2011	Patrick Shine *
Britwell	Ind. Britwellian Res.	2006	2010	John Joseph Finn *
Central	Conservative	2002	2012	Pervez Choudhry (k)
Central	Labour	2008	2011	Arvind Singh Dhaliwal (a)
Central	Labour	2006	2010	Shafiq Ahmed Chaudhry
Chalvey	Conservative	2008	2012	Mohammad Basharat
Chalvey	Labour	2001	2011	Raja Mohammad Zarait
Chalvey	Labour	2006	2010	Mohammed Rasib (l)
Cippenham Green	Labour	2008	2012	Roger Francis Davis
Cippenham Green	Labour	2007	2011	Patricia Josephine O'Connor
Cippenham Green	Labour	2002	2010	James Charles Robert Swindlehurst
Cippenham Meadows	Labour	2003	2012	May Dodds
Cippenham Meadows	Labour	2001	2011	Sat Pal Singh Parmar (b)
Cippenham Meadows	Labour	2004	2010	Nimrit Chohan
Colnbrook with Poyle	Labour	2008	2012	James Lawrence Walsh
Colnbrook with Poyle	Labour	2007	2011	Rakesh Pabbi
Farnham	Labour	1997	2012	Robert Anderson
Farnham	Labour	2001	2011	Joginder Singh Bal
Farnham	Labour	2002	2010	Sukhjit Kaur Dhaliwal (l)
Foxborough	Liberal Democrats	2008	2012	Duncan Peter Buchanan * (c)
Foxborough	Liberal Democrats	2004	2011	Sonja Anne Jenkins *
Foxborough	Liberal Democrats	2004	2010	Robert Clive Plimmer *
Haymill	Liberal	1987	2012	Richard Stanley Stokes * (d)
Haymill	Liberal	1990	2011	David John Munkley *
Haymill	Liberal	2004	2010	Brian Graham Hewitt *
Kedermister	Labour	2002	2012	Jagjit Singh Grewal
Kedermister	Labour	1988	2011	Mewa Singh Mann
Kedermister	Labour	2002	2010	Christine Rita Small
Langley St Mary's	Conservative	2008	2012	Peter Dale-Gough
Langley St Mary's	Conservative	2006	2011	Diana Victoria Coad
Langley St Mary's	Conservative	2000	2010	Derek Ernest Cryer (e)
Upton	Conservative	1999	2012	Julia Thomson Long (f)
Upton	Conservative	2004	2011	Balwinder Singh Dhillon (g)
Upton	Labour	2006	2010	Balvinder Singh Bains (h)
Wexham Lea	Independent	2000	2012	Michael Anthony Haines * (i)
Wexham Lea	Independent	2002	2011	David Ian MacIsaac *
Wexham Lea	Independent	2004	2010	Mohammed Latif Khan * (j)

Notes:-

- * Member of the Britwellian, Independent, Liberal and Liberal Democrats Group (BILLD)
- (a) A.S. Dhaliwal: Formerly served 2000–2004
- (b) Parmar: Formerly served 1995–2000
- (c) Buchanan: Formerly served 2004–2006
- (d) Stokes: Formerly a Labour Councillor 1983–1986
- (e) Cryer: Formerly served 1967–1974
- (f) Long: Formerly served 1983–1990
- (g) Dhillon: Formerly Conservative 2004 and Independent Conservative 2004–2007.
- (h) Bains: Formerly served 2003–2004
- (i) Haines: Formerly a Labour Councillor 1987–1991 and 1992–1998
- (j) Khan: Formerly a Labour Councillor 1999–2002
- (k) Choudry: Defected from Labour to Conservative on 12 May 2008, after the election.
- (l) S.K. Dhaliwal, Rasib: Defected from Labour to Conservative on 13 May 2008, and re-defected back to Labour later the same day.

== See also ==
- Slough
- Slough local elections
- Slough Borough Council
- Slough (UK Parliament constituency)
