= 2006 Slough Borough Council election =

2006 UK local government election

Results of the 2006 Slough Borough Council election

Elections to Slough Borough Council were held on 4 May 2006. One third of the council was up for election. This was the 121st Slough general local authority election (including both whole Council elections and elections by thirds) since Slough became a local government unit in 1863.

Overall, the Labour Party gained three seats, the Conservative Party lost two and the Liberal Democrats lost one. This result was slightly unusual compared with the other UK local elections on the same day whereby the Conservative Party generally gained seats at the expense of the Labour Party.

This election filled thirteen seats for the term 2006–2010. The remaining twenty-eight Slough Councillors continued in office. These seats were previously contested in the whole Council election of 2004 following the redrawing of the ward boundaries in the Borough.

== Recent political history of Slough ==
Slough has an unusual balance of political forces. In the twenty-first century the town has developed something that more resembles the party systems of countries like France and Italy, than that typical in England.

The council has, since 2004, had no party in overall control. A coalition of the Britwellian, Independent, Liberal and Liberal Democrat Group (BILLD) and the Conservative Group form the current administration, with the Labour Group in opposition. There were (in April 2006) two non-Group affiliated Independents, one an Independent Conservative and the other an Independent Britwellian Residents Councillor, who is seeking re-election on a Slough Independents ticket.

The BILLD Group is itself a local coalition, containing members from six parties or groups of Independent Councillors based on particular Wards. The existing members of the Group have an electoral pact for the current election, continuing electoral arrangements which started with the 2001 Slough Council election.

A number of Independents and others, not affiliated to BILLD, contested the 2006 election.

In April 2006, the composition of the 41 member council was:-

- BILLD 17 (Slough Liberal Democrats 6, Slough Liberals 3, (Wexham Lea) Independents 3, Independent Britwellian Residents 2, Independent Langley Residents 2, United Kingdom Independence Party 1)
- Labour 15
- Conservative 7
- Independent Britwellian Residents (Paul Janik) 1
- Independent Conservative (Balwinder Singh Dhillon) 1

In the 2006 election 51 candidates were nominated for the 13 seats up for election. The list is broken down by Party or group of Independents, with a residual category of Independent candidates standing without prefix or suffix and not affiliated to BILLD.

- Conservative 13
- Labour 13
- BILLD 12 (Slough Liberal Democrats 8, Independent 1, Independent Britwellian Residents 1, Independent Langley Residents 1, Slough Liberals 1)
- Independent 5
- Slough Independents 4
- Green Party of England and Wales 2
- Independent Farnham Residents 1
- Respect for Peace, Justice and Equality 1

== Summary of Council composition 2004–2006 ==
Before the elections held on 4 May 2006, the composition of Slough Borough Council was as follows:

Composition Table (as of April 2006)
Party	Group Leader	Seats 04	% Seats	Change (on 2004)	Seats 06
Labour	Robert Anderson	15	36.59	0	15
Other parties	Richard Stokes	11	26.83	+2	13
Conservative	Dexter Smith	9	21.95	-2	7
Liberal Democrats	Duncan Buchanan	6	14.63	0	6
Total Seats		41			

No overall Majority

Note: The Others category in this table includes all non-Labour, Conservative and Liberal Democrat Councillors. Richard Stokes (Liberal-Haymill) is the BILLD Group Leader, which group includes the Liberal Democrats and all the Others category Councillors in 2004. By 2006 two of the Councillors in the Others category are not part of the BILLD Group. Two Councillors left the Conservative group between 2004–2006 (one of whom joined BILLD) and a third Councillor left BILLD, re-joined and then left again.

== List of expiring seats before election ==
Ward	Party	Elected	Incumbent	Cand.?
Baylis & Stoke	Liberal Democrats	2004	Duncan Peter Buchanan *	Yes (a)
Britwell	Ind. Britwellian Res.	2003	Paul Janik (b)	Yes
Central	Conservative	2004	Sumander Khan	Yes
Chalvey	Labour	2004	Shabana Zeib	No
Cippenham Green	Labour	2002	James Charles Robert Swindlehurst	Yes
Cippenham Meadows	Labour	2004	Nimrit Chohan	Yes
Farnham	Labour	2002	Sukhjit Kaur Dhaliwal	Yes
Foxborough	Liberal Democrats	2004	Robert Clive Plimmer *	Yes
Haymill	Liberal	2004	Brian Graham Hewitt *	Yes
Kedermister	Labour	2002	Christine Rita Small	Yes
Langley St Mary's	Conservative	2000	Derek Ernest Cryer (c)	Yes
Upton	Conservative	2004	Kevin Charles Pond	Yes
Wexham Lea	Independent	2004	Mohammed Latif Khan * (d)	Yes

- * Member of the BILLD Group
- Notes:
- (a) Candidate in Kedermister Ward.
- (b) Left the BILLD Group after the 2004 election, re-joined it, then left again. Seeking re-election as a Slough Independents candidate.
- (c) Formerly served as a Councillor 1967–1974.
- (d) Formerly served as a Labour Councillor 1999–2002.

== Election result summary ==
Slough Borough Council Election Result 2006 (third of total seats)
Party	Seats	Gains	Losses	Net gain/loss	Seats %	Votes %	Votes	+/−
Labour	8 (18)	+3	0	+3	61.54	41.14	11,619	+1.39
Conservative	1 (5)	0	-2	-2	7.69	26.92	7,603	+1.53
Liberal Democrats	1 (5)	0	-1	-1	7.69	13.73	3,879	+1.99
Others	3 (13)	0	0	0	23.08	18.21	5,145	-4.91

- Note: The figures in brackets, in the seats column, are for the overall Councillors after the election.

== Ward notes and 2006 results ==
Slough was first warded in 1930. The town was re-warded 1950, 1983 and 2004.

Britwell and Wexham Court were added to Slough in 1973 (when the two new wards and eleven existing wards were allocated between two and nine seats, instead of the three per ward which had existed previously).

Colnbrook & Poyle was added to Slough in 1995 and became a fourteenth ward, with one member 1995–1996 and two from 1997.

For 2004 Slough Council election the Borough was re-warded. There were still fourteen wards, but only Colnbrook with Poyle (formerly Colnbrook & Poyle) and Haymill had unchanged boundaries.

For brief notes on the individual wards used since 2004, see the individual ward sections below.

The turnout box figures given below include a number of spoilt ballots – see the official results on the Slough Borough Council website for further details.

As the 2004 Slough Council election was for the whole Council, with each ward returning multiple Councillors, no plus or minus percentages are given for individual candidates or majorities nor a swing figure.

=== Baylis & Stoke ===
Baylis & Stoke (born 2004) is a three-member ward in the north of the Borough, to the west of Central ward and to the east of Haymill. It broadly combined the former Baylis and Stoke wards. Baylis was named after Baylis House and the estate of Baylis, which from the sixteenth century was a sub-division of the parish of Stoke Poges. Stoke ward was named after the parish, southern parts of which were included in Slough, as part of the 1900 and 1930–1931 extensions of the district boundaries. The Liberal Democrats, (building on the Liberal tradition of the Liberal-Labour marginal Stoke ward) overcame the Labour leanings of the former Baylis ward, to win all three seats in 2004. In 2006, with a new Liberal Democrat candidate, one of the seats was lost to Labour.

Slough Borough Council elections, 2006: Baylis & Stoke
Party	Candidate	Votes	%	±%
Labour	Azhar Qureshi	1,189	42.63	N/A
Liberal Democrats	Shakeel Ashraf *	838	30.05	N/A
Conservative	Surinder Singh Jabble	481	17.25	N/A
Respect	Ghazi Haider Khan	202	7.24	N/A
Slough Independents	Nicholas Trevredy Hoath	79	2.83	N/A
Majority		351	12.59	N/A
Turnout		2,804	42.45	−0.87
Labour gain from Liberal Democrats		Swing	N/A	

=== Britwell ===
Britwell (born 1973) is a three-member ward in the north-west of the Borough. It includes Britwell parish, although since 1983 some unparished territory was added. Britwell elected some Liberal Councillors in the 1980s but was otherwise safely Labour until 2000. Since then Britwellian and Independent Britwellian Residents Councillors have become increasingly successful. In 1997 Labour won all three seats, but in 2004 the Residents took the three seats. Patl Janik, the incumbent IBR Councillor, stood for re-election in 2006 as a Slough Independents candidate in opposition to a new IBR nominee, who was elected.

Slough Borough Council elections, 2006: Britwell
Party	Candidate	Votes	%	±%
Britwellian	John Joseph Finn *	672	41.58	N/A
Labour	Patricia Anne O'Brien	372	23.02	N/A
Slough Independents	Paul Janik +	363	22.46	N/A
Conservative	Timothy Charles Williams	176	10.89	N/A
Independent	Christopher Gary Sliski	33	2.04	N/A
Majority		300	18.56	N/A
Turnout		1,623	29.55	−1.43
Britwellian hold		Swing	N/A	

- Note: The incumbent Independent Britwellian Residents Councillor was Paul Janik, who stood for re-election as a Slough Independents candidate against a new IBR nominee. The result is categorised as an IBR hold.

=== Central ===
Central (1930–1950 and 1983–) has had different boundaries during the three of the four Slough redistributions in which it has existed (it was divided between Central North and Central South wards 1950–1983), but it has always been a three-member ward with Wexham to the north, Langley to the east, Upton to the south, Chalvey to the south-west and Baylis & Stoke to the west. It was part of the original parish of Upton-cum-Chalvey, although the hamlet of Slough (a few scattered houses and coaching inns along the Great West Road and Windsor Road) was smaller than the villages of Upton and Chalvey until the Great Western Railway arrived in the 1840s. It was a safe Labour ward under the 1983 boundaries, but in 2004 the Conservatives won two of the three seats of the revised ward. In 2006 there was a straight fight between the Conservative incumbent and a Labour challenger, which the Labour candidate won. It is noticeable that he was the only Councillor elected in 2006 with more than 50% of the votes cast in his ward.

Slough Borough Council elections, 2006: Central
Party	Candidate	Votes	%	±%
Labour	Shafiq Ahmed Chaudhry	1,656	55.93	N/A
Conservative	Sumander Khan +	1,305	44.07	N/A
Majority		351	11.85	N/A
Turnout		3,007	44.33	+0.27
Labour gain from Conservative		Swing	N/A	

=== Chalvey ===
Chalvey (born 1930), (in the south of the Borough) is a three-member ward. It was part of the ancient parish of Upton-cum-Chalvey and was an original ward of Slough. The ward has existed in some form continuously since the district was first warded in 1930. Before 1970 Chalvey was Conservative but since then it has been safely Labour. The Liberal Democrats came within ten votes of winning the last seat in the ward in 2004. Labour retained the seat with an increased majority in 2006, so they still hold all three seats.

Slough Borough Council elections, 2006: Chalvey
Party	Candidate	Votes	%	±%
Labour	Mohammed Rasib	943	48.26	N/A
Liberal Democrats	Gulshan Nasreen Ali *	680	34.80	N/A
Conservative	Carol Ann Stanmore	331	16.94	N/A
Majority		263	13.46	N/A
Turnout		1,971	35.65	+3.41
Labour hold		Swing	N/A	

=== Cippenham Green ===
Cippenham Green (born 2004) is a three-member ward in the south-west of the Borough. It was one of the two wards based on the old Cippenham Ward, which was a Labour/Conservative marginal (six Conservative and eleven Labour wins between 1983 and 2003). This area is the western part of the previous ward, incorporates the old Cippenham village area (now a suburb of Slough). This ward includes the village green, which it is named after. In 2004 it elected 1 Conservative (since defected to UKIP) and 2 Labour Councillors. One of the Labour councillors was re-elected in 2006.

Slough Borough Council elections, 2006: Cippenham Green
Party	Candidate	Votes	%	±%
Labour	James Charles Robert Swindlehurst +	1,089	48.88	N/A
Conservative	Diana Victoria Dale-Gough	781	35.05	N/A
Liberal Democrats	Nasdeem Anwar Rana *	217	9.74	N/A
Independent	Dominic James Ashford	122	5.48	N/A
Slough Independents	Sukhdev Singh Sohal	19	0.85	N/A
Majority		308	13.82	N/A
Turnout		2,236	39.02	+0.26
Labour hold		Swing	N/A	

=== Cippenham Meadows ===
Cippenham Meadows (born 2004) is a three-member ward in the south-west of the Borough. It was one of the two wards based on the old Cippenham Ward, which was a Labour/Conservative marginal (six Conservative and eleven Labour wins between 1983 and 2003). This area is the eastern part of the previous ward, incorporating the Windsor Meadows development. This estate caused the large population growth in the area, since the 1983 redistribution of wards. Presumably these are the Meadows which the ward is named after. The ward elected 3 Labour Councillors in 2004. The Labour incumbent, up for election in 2006, was re-elected.

Slough Borough Council elections, 2006: Cippenham Meadows
Party	Candidate	Votes	%	±%
Labour	Nimrit Chohan +	993	45.16	N/A
Conservative	Adrian Hilton	737	33.52	N/A
Liberal Democrats	Mohammad Atiq Akbar Sandhu *	469	21.33	N/A
Majority		256	11.64	N/A
Turnout		2,213	34.11	+0.16
Labour hold		Swing	N/A	

=== Colnbrook with Poyle (no election 2006) ===
Colnbrook & Poyle (1995–2004), Colnbrook with Poyle (born 2004) is a (since 1997) two-member ward in the furthest east part of the Borough between to the M4 motorway and Greater London. Labour elected some Councillors here, in 1995 and 1997 (1 seat), but by 2004 the ward was safely Conservative. There was no election in this ward in 2006.

=== Farnham ===
Farnham (1930–1950 and 1983–) is a three-member ward in the west of the Borough, to the south of Britwell and west of Haymill. It was named after Farnham Royal parish, the southern part of which was incorporated in Slough as part of the 1930–1931 boundary extension. This was an original Slough ward. It was split between Farnham North and Farnham South wards 1950–1983. This was a safe Labour Ward, in 2004 as before. Labour won in 2006, but may be vulnerable to a less fragmented opposition in future elections.

Slough Borough Council elections, 2006: Farnham
Party	Candidate	Votes	%	±%
Labour	Sukhjit Kaur Dhaliwal +	935	40.56	N/A
Ind. Farnham Res.	Amrik Singh Johal	612	26.55	N/A
Conservative	Maurice Arthur Stanmore	438	19.00	N/A
Liberal Democrats	Abid Maqbool Malik *	320	13.88	N/A
Majority		323	14.01	N/A
Turnout		2,319	38.18	−1.57
Labour hold		Swing	N/A	

=== Foxborough ===
Foxborough (born 1983) is a three-member ward in south-east Langley in the eastern part of the Borough. It is named after a 4-acre (16,000 m^{2}) area mentioned in connection with the inclosure of Langley Marish parish in 1809. This was the ward where the Liberal Democrats won their first election to Slough Borough Council in 2000 and the party held all three seats after the 2004 election. The Liberal Democrats retained one of their seats in 2006.

Slough Borough Council elections, 2006: Foxborough
Party	Candidate	Votes	%	±%
Liberal Democrats	Robert Clive Plimmer *+	854	43.75	N/A
Labour	James Lawrence Walsh	715	36.63	N/A
Conservative	Marion Edith Williams	321	16.44	N/A
Green	Michelle Little	62	3.18	N/A
Majority		139	7.12	N/A
Turnout		1,957	40.02	+2.12
Liberal Democrats hold		Swing	N/A	

=== Haymill ===
Haymill (born 1983) is a three-member ward in the west of the Borough (to the east of Farnham ward and west of Baylis & Stoke), which was left unchanged by the 2004 redistribution. It is a safe Liberal ward having last elected a non-Liberal Councillor in 1984. The Liberal Councillors and activists, for this ward, did not join the Liberal Democrats in 1988. In 2006 the Liberal Councillor up for election held his seat, so all three Councillors are still Liberals.

Slough Borough Council elections, 2006: Haymill
Party	Candidate	Votes	%	±%
Liberal	Brian Graham Hewitt *+	755	40.22	N/A
Conservative	Peter Dale-Gough	534	28.45	N/A
Labour	Patricia Josephine O'Conner	489	26.05	N/A
Independent	Marcus Roland Charles Kirby	99	5.27	N/A
Majority		221	11.77	N/A
Turnout		1,887	29.74	+1.87
Liberal hold		Swing	N/A	

=== Kedermister ===
Kedermister (sometimes locally pronounced Keddermeister) (1983–) is a three-member ward in south-west Langley, in the eastern part of the Borough. The ward was named after Sir John Kedermister (or Kidderminster), who was Warden of Langley Park and founded some almshouses in Langley in 1617. It is a safe Labour ward and the party held its seat in 2006.

Slough Borough Council elections, 2006: Kedermister
Party	Candidate	Votes	%	±%
Labour	Christine Rita Small +	941	47.07	N/A
Conservative	Peter Cruze	752	37.62	N/A
Liberal Democrats	Duncan Peter Buchanan * +	306	15.31	N/A
Majority		189	9.45	N/A
Turnout		2,016	35.23	−6.84
Labour hold		Swing	N/A	

- Note: Councillor Buchanan was the incumbent in Baylis and Stoke ward

=== Langley St Mary's ===
Langley St Mary's (born 1983) is a three-member ward in north Langley, in the eastern part of the Borough. St Mary's is named after the church in Langley. This has been a Labour/Conservative marginal ward, but in 2004 the Independent Langley Residents won two seats and tied for the third (which the Conservative candidate won on a roll of dice, so he was credited with an additional vote). The Conservative Councillor increased his majority to seven in 2006 (over Labour, with ILR in third place), for the only Tory victory of the 2006 Slough election.

Slough Borough Council elections, 2006: Langley St Mary's
Party	Candidate	Votes	%	±%
Conservative	Derek Ernest Cryer +	742	36.71	N/A
Labour	Thomas William Dymock Kelly	735	36.37	N/A
Ind. Langley Res.	Liam Bernard Meehan *	423	20.93	N/A
Independent	Edward Mansel Jones	121	5.99	N/A
Majority		7	0.35	N/A
Turnout		2,025	38.46	−3.80
Conservative hold		Swing	N/A	

=== Upton ===
Upton (born 1930), part of the original parish of Upton-cum-Chalvey (in the south of the modern Borough), is a ward which has existed in some form continuously since 1930. It is a three-seat ward. In the early nineteenth century Upton was a village about a mile and a half south-west of the hamlet of Slough (see Central ward). This was the most Conservative area of Slough until demographic change made Labour competitive. Labour won the ward for the first time ever in 1990. In 1997 Labour won two seats and the Conservatives one. At the 2004 election the Conservatives won all three seats, although one Councillor has since become an Independent Conservative. Labour gained a seat from the Tories in 2006.

Slough Borough Council elections, 2006: Upton
Party	Candidate	Votes	%	±%
Labour	Balvinder Singh Bains	846	40.85	N/A
Conservative	Kevin Charles Pond +	746	36.02	N/A
Liberal Democrats	Helen Linda Edwards *	195	9.42	N/A
Slough Independents	Balbir Kalsi	187	9.03	N/A
Green	Alan Diarmid Hatch	97	4.68	N/A
Majority		100	4.83	N/A
Turnout		2,078	37.77	−7.09
Labour gain from Conservative		Swing	N/A	

=== Wexham Lea ===
Wexham Lea (born 1983) is a three-member ward in the north of the Borough, to the north-east of Baylis & Stoke and the north of Central ward. It combines Wexham Court parish and an area known as Upton Lea. The ward was formerly safely Labour but is now securely held by Independent Councillors who won all three seats in 2004. The Mayor of Slough for 2005–2006 was re-elected in 2006.

Slough Borough Council elections, 2006: Wexham Lea
Party	Candidate	Votes	%	±%
Independent	Mohammed Latif Khan *+	945	41.56	N/A
Labour	Joan Jones	716	31.49	N/A
Independent	Martin Joseph Blake	354	15.57	N/A
Conservative	Mary Edith Collins	259	11.39	N/A
Majority		229	10.07	N/A
Turnout		2,291	37.22	−3.52
Independent hold		Swing	N/A	

- Symbols: * BILLD Group candidate, + incumbent

== Members of Slough Borough Council 2006–2007 ==
Ward	Party	Elected	Term	Councillor
Baylis & Stoke	Liberal Democrats	2004	2008	Rashad Javaid Butt *
Baylis & Stoke	Liberal Democrats	2004	2007	Mushtaq Ahmed Hayat *
Baylis & Stoke	Labour	2006	2010	Azhar Qureshi
Britwell	Ind. Britwellian Res.	2002	2008	Sean Patrick Wright *
Britwell	Ind. Britwellian Res.	2002	2007	Patrick Shine *
Britwell	Ind. Britwellian Res.	2006	2010	John Joseph Finn *
Central	Conservative	2004	2008	Mohammed Aziz
Central	Labour	1999	2007	Lydia Emelda Simmons (a)
Central	Labour	2006	2010	Shafiq Ahmed Chaudhry
Chalvey	Labour	2002	2008	Pervez Choudhry
Chalvey	Labour	2001	2007	Raja Mohammad Zarait
Chalvey	Labour	2006	2010	Mohammed Rasib
Cippenham Green	UK Independence	1995	2008	William Geoffrey Howard * (b)
Cippenham Green	Labour	2004	2007	Michael John Holledge
Cippenham Green	Labour	2002	2010	James Charles Robert Swindlehurst
Cippenham Meadows	Labour	2003	2008	May Dodds
Cippenham Meadows	Labour	2001	2007	Satpal Singh Parmar (c)
Cippenham Meadows	Labour	2004	2010	Nimrit Chohan
Colnbrook with Poyle	Conservative	2000	2008	Dexter Jerome Smith
Colnbrook with Poyle	Conservative	1997	2007	Steven John Burkmar
Farnham	Labour	1997	2008	Robert Anderson
Farnham	Labour	2001	2007	Joginder Singh Bal
Farnham	Labour	2002	2010	Sukhjit Kaur Dhaliwal
Foxborough	Liberal Democrats	2000	2008	John William Edwards *
Foxborough	Liberal Democrats	2004	2007	Sonja Anne Jenkins *
Foxborough	Liberal Democrats	2004	2010	Robert Clive Plimmer *
Haymill	Liberal	1987	2008	Richard Stanley Stokes * (d)
Haymill	Liberal	1990	2007	David John Munkley *
Haymill	Liberal	2004	2010	Brian Graham Hewitt *
Kedermister	Labour	2002	2008	Jagjit Singh Grewal
Kedermister	Labour	1988	2007	Mewa Singh Mann
Kedermister	Labour	2002	2010	Christine Rita Small
Langley St Mary's	Ind. Langley Res.	2004	2008	Neil James Arnold *
Langley St Mary's	Ind. Langley Res.	2004	2007	Pauline Florence Key *
Langley St Mary's	Conservative	2000	2010	Derek Ernest Cryer (e)
Upton	Conservative	1999	2008	Julia Thomson Long (f)
Upton	Ind. Conservative	2004	2007	Balwinder Singh Dhillon (g)
Upton	Labour	2006	2010	Balvinder Singh Bains (h)
Wexham Lea	Independent	2000	2008	Michael Anthony Haines * (i)
Wexham Lea	Independent	2002	2007	David Ian MacIsaac *
Wexham Lea	Independent	2004	2010	Mohammed Latif Khan * (j)

Notes:-

- * Member of the BILLD Group
- (a) Simmons: Formerly served 1979–1994
- (b) Howard: Formerly Labour 1995–2001 and Conservative 2001–2005
- (c) Parmar: Formerly served 1995–2000
- (d) Stokes: Formerly served as a Labour Councillor 1983–1986
- (e) Cryer: Formerly served 1967–1974
- (f) Long: Formerly served 1983–1990
- (g) Dhillon: Formerly Conservative 2004
- (h) Bains: Formerly 2003–2004
- (i) Haines: Formerly served as a Labour Councillor 1987–1991 and 1992–1998
- (j) Khan: Formerly served as a Labour Councillor 1999–2002

== See also ==
- Slough
- Slough local elections
- Slough Borough Council
- Slough (UK Parliament constituency)
