= 2003 Slough Borough Council election =

Local election in Slough

← 2002	1 May 2003	2004 →

15 seats of 45 on council 23 seats needed for a majority
	First party	Second party	Third party
Party	Labour	Conservative	Britwellian
	Fourth party	Fifth party	Sixth party
Party	Liberal	Liberal Democrats	Independent

The 2003 Slough Borough Council election was held on 1 May 2003, at the same time as other local elections across England and Scotland. Fourteen of the 41 seats on Slough Borough Council were up for election, being the usual third of the council.

== Ward results ==
The elected councillors were:

Ward	Party	Elected	Term	Councillor
Baylis	Labour	2003	2004	Balvinder Singh Bains
Britwell	Ind. Britwellian Res.	2002	2004	Patrick Shine *
Central	Labour	2000	2004	Arvind Singh Dhaliwal
Chalvey	Labour	2000	2004	George Henry Davidson
Cippenham	Conservative	1995	2004	William Geoffrey Howard
Colnbrook & Poyle	Conservative	2000	2004	Dexter Jerome Smith
Farnham	Labour	1997	2004	Robert Anderson
Foxborough	Liberal Democrats	2000	2004	John William Edwards *
Haymill	Liberal	1987	2004	Richard Stanley Stokes * (a)
Kedermister	Labour	2003	2004	May Dodds
Langley St Mary's	Conservative	2000	2004	Derek Ernest Cryer (b)
Stoke	Labour	2002	2004	Egbert Christian Thomas
Upton	Conservative	1999	2004	Julia Thomson Long (c)
Wexham Lea	Independent	2000	2004	Michael Anthony Haines * (d)

Notes:-

- Member of the Britwellian, Independent, Liberal and Liberal Democrat Group (ILLD then BILLD) (after the 2000 election)
- (a) Stokes: Formerly served as a Labour councillor 1983–1986
- (b) Cryer: Formerly served as a councillor 1967–1974
- (c) Long: Formerly served as a councillor 1983–1990
- (d) Haines: Formerly served as a Labour councillor 1987–1991 and 1992–1998
