= 2011 Slough Borough Council election =

Local election in Berkshire, UK

Results of the 2011 Slough Borough Council election

Elections to Slough Borough Council were held on 5 May 2011, alongside other local elections across the United Kingdom. 14 seats (one third) of the council were up for election. Following the election the council remained under Labour control.

== Results ==
Results
Party	Seats Before	Change	Seats After
Labour Party	23	▲4	27
Conservative Party	8	▲1	9
Liberal Democrats	3	▼1	2
Others	7	▼4	3

== See also ==
- Slough Borough Council elections
