= 2019 Slough Borough Council election =

2019 UK local government election

Results of the 2019 Slough Borough Council election

The 2019 Slough Borough Council election took place on 2 May 2019 to elect members of Slough Borough Council in England. This was on the same day as other local elections.

== Ward results ==
=== Baylis & Stoke ===
Baylis & Stoke
Party	Candidate	Votes	%	±%
Labour	Mohammad Nazir	1,720	85.4	
Conservative	David Munkley	294	14.6	
Majority				
Turnout				
Labour hold		Swing		

=== Britwell and Northborough ===
Britwell and Northborough
Party	Candidate	Votes	%	±%
Labour	Pavitar Mann	1,120	61.8	
Independent	Olly Isernia	384	21.2	
Conservative	Sebastian Rysnik	309	17.0	
Majority				
Turnout			26.4	
Labour hold		Swing		

=== Central ===
Central
Party	Candidate	Votes	%	±%
Labour	Christine Hulme	1,451	73.8	
Conservative	Chandra Muvvala	515	26.2	
Majority				
Turnout			26.9	
Labour hold		Swing		

=== Chalvey ===
Chalvey
Party	Candidate	Votes	%	±%
Labour	Raqayah Begum	1,396	79.8	
Conservative	Rhys Williams	353	20.2	
Majority				
Turnout			26.2	
Labour hold		Swing		

=== Cippenham Green ===
Cippenham Green
Party	Candidate	Votes	%	±%
Labour Co-op	James Swindlehurst	1,037	50.5	
Conservative	Lee Pettman	786	38.3	
UKIP	Nick Smith	229	11.2	
Majority				
Turnout			30.3	
Labour Co-op hold		Swing		

=== Cippenham Meadows ===
Cippenham Meadows
Party	Candidate	Votes	%	±%
Labour Co-op	Natasa Pantelic	1,098	56.9	
Liberal Democrats	Matthew Taylor	427	22.1	
Conservative	Charlie Olsen	405	21.0	
Majority				
Turnout			25.8	
Labour hold		Swing		

=== Colnbrook with Poyle ===
Colnbrook with Poyle
Party	Candidate	Votes	%	±%
Conservative	Dexter Smith	643	53.4	
Labour	Gurdeep Grewel	560	46.6	
Majority				
Turnout			29.2	
Conservative hold		Swing		

=== Elliman ===
Elliman
Party	Candidate	Votes	%	±%
Labour Co-op	Sabia Hussain	1,261	78.8	
Conservative	Benjamin Vincent	340	21.2	
Majority				
Turnout			26.6	
Labour Co-op hold		Swing		

=== Farnham ===
Farnham
Party	Candidate	Votes	%	±%
Labour	Maroof Mohammad	1,224	67.5	
Conservative	Allison Miller-Ross	473	26.1	
Independent	Taheira Mughal	117	6.4	
Majority				
Turnout			26.9	
Labour hold		Swing		

=== Haymill and Lynch Hill ===
Haymill and Lynch Hill
Party	Candidate	Votes	%	±%
Conservative	Paul Kelly	896	50.4	
Labour	Hamzah Ahmed	600	33.7	
Liberal Democrats	Niccola Parkes	282	15.9	
Majority				
Turnout			25.8	
Conservative hold		Swing		

=== Langley Kedermister ===
Langley Kedermister
Party	Candidate	Votes	%	±%
Labour	Harpreet Cheema	977	45.8	
Conservative	Meena Sharma	746	35.0	
Independent	Sharon O'Reilly	264	12.4	
Liberal Democrats	Josephine Hanney	146	6.8	
Majority				
Turnout			30.2	
Labour hold		Swing		

=== Langley St. Mary's ===
Langley St. Mary's
Party	Candidate	Votes	%	±%
Labour Co-op	Zaffar Ajaib	1,031	48.2	
Conservative	Christine Bamigbola	802	37.5	
Green	Julian Edmonds	304	14.2	
Majority				
Turnout			29.6	
Labour Co-op gain from Conservative		Swing		

=== Upton ===
Upton
Party	Candidate	Votes	%	±%
Labour	Jina Basra	1,056	47.1	
Conservative	Gurcharan Manku	862	38.4	
Green	Olivia Dixon	181	8.1	
Liberal Democrats	Rob Parkes	145	6.5	
Majority				
Turnout			32.5	
Labour gain from Conservative		Swing		

=== Wexham Lea ===
Wexham Lea
Party	Candidate	Votes	%	±%
Labour	Harjinder Gahir	1,341	54.6	
Independent	Ken Wright	501	20.4	
Independent	Shafait Hussain	412	16.8	
Conservative	Jasvinder Singh	200	8.1	
Majority				
Turnout			37.0	
Labour hold		Swing		
