= 2004 Slough Borough Council election =

2004 UK local government election

Results of the 2004 Slough Borough Council election

An election to Slough Borough Council was held on 10 June 2004. The whole council was up for election. This was the 120th Slough general local authority election, since Slough became a local government unit in 1863, including both whole Council elections and elections by thirds.

The Borough had been re-warded for this election. For the previous three Slough elections, which had each returned a third of the council, see 2001 Slough Council election, 2002 Slough Council election and 2003 Slough Council election.

The 2004 election was to fill forty-one seats. The leading vote winner in each of the fourteen wards was elected for the term 2004–2008. The second placed candidates were elected for 2004–2007. In all the wards, except Colnbrook with Poyle, the candidate with the third highest number of votes was elected for the term 2004–2006.

== Recent political history of Slough to 2004 ==
Slough Borough Council, between 1983 and 2004, had been controlled by the Labour Party.

Between 2003 and 2004, there were three groups of Councillors. In addition to the Labour Group and the Conservative Group there was the Britwellian, Independent, Liberal and Liberal Democrat Group (BILLD).

The BILLD Group was composed of all the Councillors, who were not Labour or Conservative. It was a coalition of a number of parties and independents. These included a Councillor or Councillors elected in particular wards; Liberal Democrat (Foxborough ward), Liberal (Haymill ward), Independent Britwellian Residents (Britwell ward) and Independent (Wexham Lea ward).

The existing members of the Group had an electoral pact for the 2004 election, which also extended to the Independent Farnham Residents candidates in Farnham ward and the Independent Langley Residents candidates in Langley St Mary's ward.

In 2003–2004, the composition of the 41 member council was:-

- Labour 26
- BILLD 9 (Independent Britwellian Residents 3, Slough Liberals 3, Independents 2 and Slough Liberal Democrat 1)
- Conservative 6

In the 2004 election 105 candidates were nominated for the 41 seats up for election. The list is broken down by Party, with a residual category of an independent candidate not affiliated to BILLD.

- Labour 41
- Conservative 28
- BILLD 26 (Slough Liberal Democrats 11, Independents 3, Independent Britwellian Residents 3, Independent Farnham Residents 3, Independent Langley Residents 3, Slough Liberals 3)
- Green Party of England and Wales 7
- United Kingdom Independence Party 2
- Independent 1

== Council by Party before and after 2004 Elections ==
Before the elections held on 10 June 2004, the composition of Slough Borough Council was as follows:

Composition Table (as of June 2004)
Party	Group Leader	Seats 03-04	% Seats	Change (on 2003–2004)	Seats 04
Labour	Robert Anderson	26	63.41	-11	15
Other parties	Richard Stokes	8	19.51	+3	11
Conservative	Derek Cryer	6	14.63	+3	9
Liberal Democrats	John Edwards	1	2.44	+5	6
Total Seats		41			

- Labour overall majority (2003–2004): 11
- No overall majority (2004–2006)

Note: The Others category in this table includes all non-Labour, Conservative and Liberal Democrat Councillors. Richard Stokes (Liberal-Haymill) is the BILLD Group Leader, which includes the Liberal Democrats and all the Others category Councillors.

== Composition of expiring seats before election ==
Ward	Party	Elected	Incumbent	Cand.?
Baylis	Labour	2001	Rajinder Singh Sandhu	Yes
Baylis	Labour	1999	Gurmej Singh Sandhu	Yes
Baylis	Labour	2004	Balvinder Singh Bains	Yes
Britwell	Ind. Britwellian Res.	2003	Paul Janik *	Yes
Britwell	Ind. Britwellian Res.	2002	Sean Patrick Wright *	Yes
Britwell	Ind. Britwellian Res.	2002	Patrick Shine *	Yes
Central	Labour	1988	Ronald William Sibley	Yes
Central	Labour	1999	Lydia Emelda Simmons	Yes
Central	Labour	2004	Arvind Singh Dhaliwal	Yes
Chalvey	Labour	2001	Satpal Singh Parmar	Yes
Chalvey	Labour	2000	George Henry Davidson	Yes
Chalvey	Labour	2002	Pervez Choudhry	Yes
Cippenham	Labour	1996	Lawrence L. Gleeson	Yes
Cippenham	Conservative	1995	William Geoffrey Howard	Yes
Cippenham	Labour	2002	James Charles Robert Swindlehurst	Yes
Colnbrook & Poyle	Conservative	1997	Steven John Burkmar	Yes
Colnbrook & Poyle	Conservative	2000	Dexter Jerome Smith	Yes
Farnham	Labour	2001	Joginder Singh Bal	Yes
Farnham	Labour	1990	David Edward Mansell	No
Farnham	Labour	1997	Robert Anderson	Yes
Foxborough	Labour	1988	Mewa Singh Mann	Yes
Foxborough	Labour	2002	Jagjit Singh Grewal	Yes
Foxborough	Liberal Democrats	2000	John William Edwards *	Yes
Haymill	Liberal	1990	David John Munkley *	Yes
Haymill	Liberal	2002	Jean Frances Stockton *	No
Haymill	Liberal	1987	Richard Stanley Stokes *	Yes
Kedermister	Labour	1997	Ronald John Webb	No
Kedermister	Labour	2002	Christine Rita Small	Yes
Kedermister	Labour	2003	May Dodds	No
Langley St Mary's	Labour	2001	Nigel Ian Rushby	No
Langley St Mary's	Conservative	1997	Terrence W. Brennan	Yes
Langley St Mary's	Conservative	2000	Derek Ernest Cryer (c)	Yes
Stoke	Labour	2001	Raja Mohammad Zarait	Yes
Stoke	Labour	1999	Simon Ashley George	Yes
Stoke	Labour	2002	Egbert Christian Thomas	No
Upton	Labour	2001	Gurcharan Singh Manku	Yes
Upton	Labour	2002	Sukhjit Kaur Dhaliwal	Yes
Upton	Conservative	1999	Julia Thomson Long	Yes
Wexham Lea	Independent	2000	Michael Anthony Haines *	Yes
Wexham Lea	Labour	2001	Muriel Douglas Gilmour	No
Wexham Lea	Independent	2002	David Ian MacIsaac *	Yes

- * Member of the BILLD Group

== Election result (overall summary) ==
Slough Borough Council Election Result 2004 (all seats)
Party	Seats	Gains	Losses	Net gain/loss	Seats %	Votes %	Votes	+/−
Labour	15	N/A	N/A	-11	36.59	39.75	31,042	N/A
Conservative	9	N/A	N/A	+3	21.95	25.39	19,830	N/A
Liberal Democrats	6	N/A	N/A	+5	14.63	11.74	9,170	N/A
Others	11	N/A	N/A	+3	26.83	23.12	18,056	N/A

Note: Due to boundary changes and this being a whole Council election, non-comparable to the 2003 election of a third of the Council, no attempt is made to provide numbers to fill the gain, loss and plus/minus columns.

== History of Slough boundaries and wards ==
The Slough local government area came into existence in 1863. It comprised a part of the parish of Upton-cum-Chalvey, roughly corresponding to the modern Central and Upton wards.

In 1894 Slough became a civil parish and then an Urban District.

In 1900 the boundaries of the Slough district were expanded for the first time, increasing its size to 1,684 acres (6.81 km^{2}). The northern boundary was extended up Stoke Road, as far as the Slough branch of the Grand Union Canal. To the south and west, Chalvey and the Salt Hill area, as far as the Montem Mound, were absorbed. To the east, part of Langley joined the district. The Agar's Plough area left Slough, to become part of Eton and provide playing fields for Eton College.

In 1930-1931 there was a major extension of the boundaries, increasing the district to 6,202 acres (25.10 km^{2}). Parts of the parishes of Burnham, Dorney, Farnham Royal, Horton, Langley Marish and Stoke Poges were added to Slough.

Slough was first warded in 1930. The original seven wards were Burnham, Central, Chalvey, Farnham, Langley, Stoke and Upton.

The town was re-warded in 1950, when four of the previous wards (Burnham, Central, Farnham and Stoke) were split into north and south wards, to make a total of eleven.

Britwell and Wexham Court were added to Slough in 1973 (when these two new wards and the eleven existing wards were allocated between two and nine seats, instead of the three per ward which had existed previously).

There was another re-warding in 1983, which created thirteen three-member wards with revised boundaries.

Colnbrook & Poyle was added to Slough in 1995 and became a fourteenth ward, with one member 1995-1997 and two from 1997.

For Slough Council election 2004 the Borough was re-warded. There were still fourteen wards, but only Colnbrook with Poyle (formerly Colnbrook & Poyle) and Haymill had unchanged boundaries.

== Election results by wards 2004 ==
=== Baylis & Stoke ===
Baylis & Stoke (born 2004) is a three-member ward in the north of the Borough, to the west of Central ward and to the east of Haymill. It broadly combined the former Baylis and Stoke wards. Baylis was named after Baylis House and the estate of Baylis, which from the sixteenth century was a sub-division of the old parish of Stoke Poges (the southern part of which is included in Slough). Stoke was named after the parish. 2003-2004: the six seats in the former wards were all held by Labour. 2004: The Liberal Democrats, building on the Liberal tradition of the marginal former Stoke ward and overcoming the Labour leanings of the former Baylis ward, won all three seats in 2004.

Slough Borough Council elections, 2004: Baylis & Stoke (3 seats)
Party	Candidate	Votes	%	±%
Liberal Democrats	Rashad Javaid Butt *	1,348	18.56	N/A
Liberal Democrats	Mushtaq Ahmed Hayat *	1,188	16.36	N/A
Liberal Democrats	Duncan Peter Buchanan *	1,187	16.35	N/A
Labour	Gurmej Singh Sandhu	1,034	14.24	N/A
Labour	Sangeeta Sharma	975	13.43	N/A
Labour	Rajinder Singh Sandhu	958	13.19	N/A
Conservative	Narinder Kaur Chagga	300	4.13	N/A
Conservative	Surinder Singh Chagga	271	3.73	N/A
Turnout		6,578	43.32	N/A

- * BILLD Group candidate

=== Britwell ===
Britwell (born 1973) is a three-member ward in the north-west of the Borough. It includes Britwell parish, although since 1983 some unparished territory was added. Before Britwell became a civil parish it was a district of the old parish of Burnham. Britwell elected some Liberal Councillors in the 1980s but was otherwise safely Labour until 2000. Since then Britwellian and Independent Britwellian Residents Councillors have become increasingly successful. In 1997 Labour won all three seats, but by 2003-2004 the Residents held the three seats. 2004: Independent Britwellian Residents retained the three seats.

Slough Borough Council elections, 2004: Britwell (3 seats)
Party	Candidate	Votes	%	±%
Britwellian	Sean Patrick Wright *	1,170	24.54	N/A
Britwellian	Patrick Shine *	1,157	24.27	N/A
Britwellian	Paul Janik *	1,151	24.15	N/A
Labour	Jacqueline Ruby Rock	397	8.33	N/A
Labour	Anthony Alan Smeaton	358	7.51	N/A
Labour	Trevor Maldwyn Allen	354	7.43	N/A
Conservative	James Reid	180	3.78	N/A
Turnout		5,571	30.98	N/A

- * BILLD Group candidate

=== Central ===
Central (1930-1950 and 1983-) has had different boundaries during the three of the four Slough redistributions in which it has existed (it was divided between Central North and Central South wards 1950–1983), but it has always been a three-member ward with Wexham to the north, Langley to the east, Upton to the south, Chalvey to the south-west and Baylis & Stoke to the west. It was part of the original parish of Upton-cum-Chalvey, although the hamlet of Slough (a few scattered houses and coaching inns along the Great West Road and Windsor Road) was smaller than the villages of Upton and Chalvey until the Great Western Railway arrived in the 1840s. 2003-2004: Labour held the three seats under the 1983 boundaries. 2004: Labour won one and the Conservatives two of the three seats of the revised ward.

Slough Borough Council elections, 2004: Central (3 seats)
Party	Candidate	Votes	%	±%
Conservative	Mohammed Aziz	1,274	16.43	N/A
Labour	Lydia Emelda Simmons	1,269	16.37	N/A
Conservative	Sumander Khan	1,267	16.34	N/A
Conservative	Hussain Razzak Malik	1,212	15.63	N/A
Labour	Arvind Singh Dhaliwal	1,194	15.40	N/A
Labour	Mohan Singh Sihota	1,131	14.59	N/A
Green	Vicki Nadine Thornton	406	5.24	N/A
Turnout		6,671	44.06	N/A

=== Chalvey ===
Chalvey (born 1930), (in the south of the Borough) is a three-member ward. In the nineteenth century it was a village that was part of the ancient parish of Upton-cum-Chalvey. It became an original ward of Slough. The ward has existed in some form continuously since the district was first warded in 1930. Before 1970 Chalvey was Conservative but since then it has been safely Labour. 2003-2004: Three Labour seats. 2004: The Liberal Democrats came within ten votes of winning a seat in the ward in 2004, but Labour retained the three seats.

Slough Borough Council elections, 2004: Chalvey (3 seats)
Party	Candidate	Votes	%	±%
Labour	Pervez Choudhry	817	17.14	N/A
Labour	Raja Mohammad Zarait	775	16.26	N/A
Labour	Shabana Zeib	750	15.73	N/A
Liberal Democrats	Joan Audrey F. Horton *	740	15.52	N/A
Liberal Democrats	Gulshan Nasreen Ali *	705	14.79	N/A
Liberal Democrats	Jagdeesh Singh *	645	13.53	N/A
Conservative	Raffat Ali	335	7.03	N/A
Turnout		5,440	32.24	N/A

- * BILLD Group candidate

=== Cippenham Green ===
Cippenham Green (born 2004) is a three-member ward in the south-west of the Borough. Cippenham was a district of the old parish of Burnham. It was one of the two wards based on the old Cippenham ward, which was a Labour/Conservative marginal (six Conservative and eleven Labour wins between 1983 and 2003). This area is the western part of the previous ward, incorporates the Cippenham village area (including the Green which the ward is named after). 2003-2004: The former Cippenham ward was represented by two Labour and one Conservative Councillors. 2004: this ward elected one Conservative and two Labour Councillors.

Slough Borough Council elections, 2004: Cippenham Green (3 seats)
Party	Candidate	Votes	%	±%
Conservative	William Geoffrey Howard	1,083	18.07	N/A
Labour	Michael John Holledge	966	16.12	N/A
Labour	James Charles Robert Swindlehurst	940	15.69	N/A
Conservative	Paul Gerard Sutton	924	15.42	N/A
Labour	Joan Jones	882	14.72	N/A
Conservative	Maurice Arthur Stanmore	870	14.52	N/A
Liberal Democrats	Wisdom M. Da Costa *	327	5.46	N/A
Turnout		5,807	38.76	N/A

- * BILLD Group candidate

=== Cippenham Meadows ===
Cippenham Meadows (born 2004) is a three-member ward in the south-west of the Borough. It was one of the two wards based on the old Cippenham Ward, which was a Labour/Conservative marginal (six Conservative and eleven Labour wins between 1983 and 2003). This area is the eastern part of the previous ward, incorporates the Windsor Meadows development which caused a large population growth since the 1983 redistribution of wards. Presumably these are the Meadows which the ward is named after. 2003-2004: see Cippenham Green. 2004: The new ward elected three Labour Councillors.

Slough Borough Council elections, 2004: Cippenham Meadows (3 seats)
Party	Candidate	Votes	%	±%
Labour	May Dodds	1,154	20.50	N/A
Labour	Satpal Singh Parmar	1,083	19.24	N/A
Labour	Nimrit Chohan	1,066	18.94	N/A
Conservative	Mary Edith Collins	728	12.93	N/A
Conservative	Graham Edward Smith	628	11.16	N/A
Conservative	Rizwan Hussain	613	10.89	N/A
Green	Debra Sant	357	6.34	N/A
Turnout		6,464	33.95	N/A

=== Colnbrook with Poyle ===
Colnbrook & Poyle (1995–2004), Colnbrook with Poyle (born 2004) is a (since 1997) two-member ward in the furthest east part of the Borough between to the M4 motorway and Greater London. Labour elected some Councillors here, in 1995 and 1997 (1 seat), but by 2000 the ward was safely Conservative. 2003-2004: Two Conservative Councillors. 2004: Two Conservative Councillors re-elected.

Slough Borough Council elections, 2004: Colnbrook with Poyle (2 seats)
Party	Candidate	Votes	%	±%
Conservative	Dexter Jerome Smith	637	26.15	N/A
Conservative	Steven John Burkmar	553	22.70	N/A
Labour	Gurcharan Singh Manku	364	14.94	N/A
Green	Jill Angela Hatch	320	13.14	N/A
Labour	Dilbagh Singh Parmar	319	13.20	N/A
Green	Miriam Kennet	243	9.98	N/A
Turnout		3,702	34.88	N/A

=== Farnham ===
Farnham (1930-1950 and 1983-) is a three-member ward in the west of the Borough, to the south of Britwell and west of Haymill. It was named after the old Farnham Royal parish, of which it was the southern part. This was an original Slough ward. There were Farnham North and Farnham South wards 1950–1983. A single Farnham ward was re-created in 1983. 2003-2004: Three Labour Councillors. 2004: This was a safe Labour Ward, with three Labour representatives.

Slough Borough Council elections, 2004: Farnham (3 seats)
Party	Candidate	Votes	%	±%
Labour	Robert Anderson	1,061	18.13	N/A
Labour	Joginder Singh Bal	1,060	18.11	N/A
Labour	Sukhjit Kaur Dhaliwal	965	16.49	N/A
Ind. Farnham Res.	Amrik Singh Johal *	787	13.45	N/A
Ind. Farnham Res.	Nicholas Trevredyn Hoath *	784	13.39	N/A
Ind. Farnham Res.	Abdul Rauf Bhatti *	695	11.87	N/A
Conservative	Bridget Mary O'Brien	501	8.56	N/A
Turnout		6,239	39.75	N/A

- * BILLD Group candidate

=== Foxborough ===
Foxborough (born 1983) is a three-member ward in south-east Langley in the eastern part of the Borough. In the 2004 redistribution the ward lost its extension west along the southern border of Langley. It is named after a 4-acre (16,000 m^{2}) area mentioned in connection with the inclosure of Langley Marish parish in 1809. This was the ward where the Liberal Democrats won their first election in Slough in 2000. 2003-2004: Two Labour and one Liberal Democrat Councillors. 2004: The Liberal Democrats held all three seats after the election.

Slough Borough Council elections, 2004: Foxborough (3 seats)
Party	Candidate	Votes	%	±%
Liberal Democrats	John William Edwards *	907	21.80	N/A
Liberal Democrats	Sonja Anne Jenkins *	886	21.30	N/A
Liberal Democrats	Robert Clive Plimmer *	714	17.16	N/A
Labour	Russell Lee Ford	469	11.27	N/A
Labour	Simon Ashley George	432	10.38	N/A
Conservative	Dalwyn Ronald Attwell	397	9.54	N/A
Labour	Alice Njeri Sheehy	355	8.53	N/A
Turnout		4,426	37.90	N/A

- * BILLD Group candidate

=== Haymill ===
Haymill (born 1983) is a three-member ward in the west of the Borough (to the east of Farnham ward), which was left unchanged by the 2004 redistribution. It is a safe Liberal ward having last elected a non-Liberal Councillor in 1984. 2003-2004: Three Liberal Councillors. 2004: Three Liberal holds.

Slough Borough Council elections, 2004: Haymill (3 seats)
Party	Candidate	Votes	%	±%
Liberal	Richard Stanley Stokes *	939	22.68	N/A
Liberal	David John Munkley *	920	22.22	N/A
Liberal	Brian Graham Hewitt *	914	22.08	N/A
Conservative	Peter Dale-Gough	535	12.92	N/A
Labour	Lawrence L. Gleeson	322	7.78	N/A
Labour	Basanti Chauhan	261	6.30	N/A
Labour	Sham Lal Bahri	249	6.01	N/A
Turnout		6,324	27.87	N/A

- * BILLD Group candidate

=== Kedermister ===
Kedermister (born 1983) is a three-member ward in south-west Langley, in the eastern part of the Borough. In 2004 it was extended south a bit. The ward was named after Sir John Kedermister (or Kidderminster), who was Warden of Langley Park and founded some almshouses in Langley in 1617. 2003-2004: three Labour Councillors. 2004: This was a safe Labour Ward, with three Labour representatives.

Slough Borough Council elections, 2004: Kedermister (3 seats)
Party	Candidate	Votes	%	±%
Labour	Jagjit Singh Grewal	923	14.43	N/A
Labour	Mewa Singh Mann	895	14.00	N/A
Labour	Christine Rita Small	765	11.96	N/A
Conservative	Ronald Albert Harman	698	10.91	N/A
Conservative	Darren Lee Gilpin	692	10.82	N/A
Conservative	Nik Stewart	670	10.48	N/A
Liberal Democrats	Helen Linda Edwards *	523	8.18	N/A
Green	Michelle Little	417	6.52	N/A
UKIP	Michael John Knight	412	6.44	N/A
Green	Mathew Glynn Geeves	400	6.25	N/A
Turnout		5,805	42.07	N/A

- * BILLD Group candidate

=== Langley St Mary's ===
Langley St Mary's (born 1983) is a three-member ward in north Langley, in the eastern part of the Borough. St Mary's is named after the church in Langley. This has been a Labour/Conservative marginal ward. 2003-2004: There were two Tory and one Labour Councillors. 2004: The Independent Langley Residents won two seats and tied for the third (which the Conservative candidate won on a roll of dice, so he was credited with an additional vote).

Slough Borough Council elections, 2004: Langley St Mary's (3 seats)
Party	Candidate	Votes	%	±%
Ind. Langley Res.	Neil James Arnold *	783	12.54	N/A
Ind. Langley Res.	Pauline Florence Key *	769	12.32	N/A
Conservative	Derek Ernest Cryer	712	11.40	N/A
Ind. Langley Res.	Jeremiah Dwyer *	711	11.39	N/A
Conservative	Terrence W. Brennan	691	11.07	N/A
Labour	Ronald William Sibley	679	10.87	N/A
Labour	Thomas William Dymock Kelly	675	10.81	N/A
Conservative	Timothy Charles Williams	618	9.90	N/A
Labour	Patricia J. O'Connor	606	9.71	N/A
Turnout		5,218	42.26	N/A

- * BILLD Group candidate

=== Upton ===
Upton (born 1930), part of the old parish of Upton-cum-Chalvey (in the south of the modern Borough), was an original ward which has existed in some form continuously since 1930. In the early nineteenth century Upton was a village about a mile and a half south-east of the hamlet of Slough. It is a three-seat ward. Upton was the most Conservative area of Slough until demographic change made Labour competitive. Labour won the ward for the first time ever in 1990. In 1997 Labour won two seats and the Conservatives one. 2003-2004: 2 Labour and 1 Conservative Councillors. 2004: The Conservatives won all three seats.

Slough Borough Council elections, 2004: Upton (3 seats)
Party	Candidate	Votes	%	±%
Conservative	Julia Thomson Long	1,141	17.65	N/A
Conservative	Balwinder Singh Dhillon	985	15.24	N/A
Conservative	Kevin Charles Pond	954	14.76	N/A
Labour	George Henry Davidson	867	13.41	N/A
Labour	Balwinder Singh Bains	865	13.38	N/A
Labour	Pushpa Kharbanda	714	11.05	N/A
Green	Alan Diarmid Hatch	385	5.96	N/A
Independent	Thomas James King	301	4.66	N/A
UKIP	John Watson Lane	252	3.90	N/A
Turnout		5,520	44.86	N/A

=== Wexham Lea ===
Wexham Lea (born 1983) is a three-member ward in the north of the Borough, to the north-east of Baylis & Stoke and the north of Central ward. It combines Wexham Court parish and an area known as Upton Lea. The ward was formerly safely Labour. 2003-2004: 1 Labour and 2 Independent Councillors. 2004: Securely held by Independent Councillors who won all three seats in 2004.

Slough Borough Council elections, 2004: Wexham Lea (3 seats)
Party	Candidate	Votes	%	±%
Independent	Michael Anthony Haines *	1,384	22.19	N/A
Independent	David Ian MacIsaac *	1,266	20.30	N/A
Independent	Mohammed Latif Khan *	1,133	18.17	N/A
Labour	Ahmad Zafar	734	11.77	N/A
Labour	Azhar Qureshi	713	11.43	N/A
Labour	Kathryn Zoechild	646	10.36	N/A
Conservative	Stephen J. Goodfellow	361	5.79	N/A
Turnout		6,256	40.74	N/A

- * BILLD Group candidate

== Members elected to Slough Borough Council 2004 ==
Ward	Party	Elected	Term	Councillor
Baylis & Stoke	Liberal Democrats	2004	2008	Rashad Javaid Butt *
Baylis & Stoke	Liberal Democrats	2004	2007	Mushtaq Ahmed Hayat *
Baylis & Stoke	Liberal Democrats	2004	2006	Duncan Peter Buchanan *
Britwell	Ind. Britwellian Res.	2002	2008	Sean Patrick Wright *
Britwell	Ind. Britwellian Res.	2002	2007	Patrick Shine *
Britwell	Ind. Britwellian Res.	2003	2006	Paul Janik *
Central	Conservative	2004	2008	Mohammed Aziz
Central	Labour	1999	2007	Lydia Emelda Simmons (a)
Central	Conservative	2004	2006	Sumander Khan
Chalvey	Labour	2002	2008	Pervez Choudhry
Chalvey	Labour	2001	2007	Raja Mohammad Zarait
Chalvey	Labour	2004	2006	Shabana Zeib
Cippenham Green	Conservative	1995	2008	William Geoffrey Howard (b)
Cippenham Green	Labour	2004	2007	Michael John Holledge
Cippenham Green	Labour	2002	2006	James Charles Robert Swindlehurst
Cippenham Meadows	Labour	2003	2008	May Dodds
Cippenham Meadows	Labour	2001	2007	Satpal Singh Parmar (c)
Cippenham Meadows	Labour	2004	2006	Nimrit Chohan
Colnbrook with Poyle	Conservative	2000	2008	Dexter Jerome Smith
Colnbrook with Poyle	Conservative	1997	2007	Steven John Burkmar
Farnham	Labour	1997	2008	Robert Anderson
Farnham	Labour	2001	2007	Joginder Singh Bal
Farnham	Labour	2002	2006	Sukhjit Kaur Dhaliwal
Foxborough	Liberal Democrats	2000	2008	John William Edwards *
Foxborough	Liberal Democrats	2004	2007	Sonja Anne Jenkins *
Foxborough	Liberal Democrats	2004	2006	Robert Clive Plimmer *
Haymill	Liberal	1987	2008	Richard Stanley Stokes * (d)
Haymill	Liberal	1990	2007	David John Munkley *
Haymill	Liberal	2004	2006	Brian Graham Hewitt *
Kedermister	Labour	2002	2008	Jagjit Singh Grewal
Kedermister	Labour	1988	2007	Mewa Singh Mann
Kedermister	Labour	2002	2006	Christine Rita Small
Langley St Mary's	Ind. Langley Res.	2004	2008	Neil James Arnold *
Langley St Mary's	Ind. Langley Res.	2004	2007	Pauline Florence Key *
Langley St Mary's	Conservative	2000	2006	Derek Ernest Cryer (e)
Upton	Conservative	1999	2008	Julia Thomson Long (f)
Upton	Conservative	2004	2007	Balwinder Singh Dhillon
Upton	Conservative	2004	2006	Kevin Charles Pond
Wexham Lea	Independent	2000	2008	Michael Anthony Haines * (g)
Wexham Lea	Independent	2002	2007	David Ian MacIsaac *
Wexham Lea	Independent	2004	2006	Mohammed Latif Khan * (h)

Notes:

- * Member of the Britwellian, Independent, Liberal and Liberal Democrat Group (BILLD)
- (a) Simmons: Formerly served as a Councillor 1979-1994
- (b) Howard: Labour 1995-2001
- (c) Parmar: Formerly served as a Councillor 1995-2000
- (d) Stokes: Formerly served as a Labour Councillor 1983-1986
- (e) Cryer: Formerly served as a Councillor 1967-1974
- (f) Long: Formerly served as a Councillor 1983-1990
- (g) Haines: Formerly served as a Labour Councillor 1987-1991 and 1992-1998
- (h) Khan: Formerly served as a Labour Councillor 1999-2002

== See also ==
- Slough
- Slough local elections
- Slough Borough Council
- Slough (UK Parliament constituency)
