= Upton, Slough =

Suburb of Slough, Berkshire, England

Coordinates: 51.504°N 0.589°W

Upton
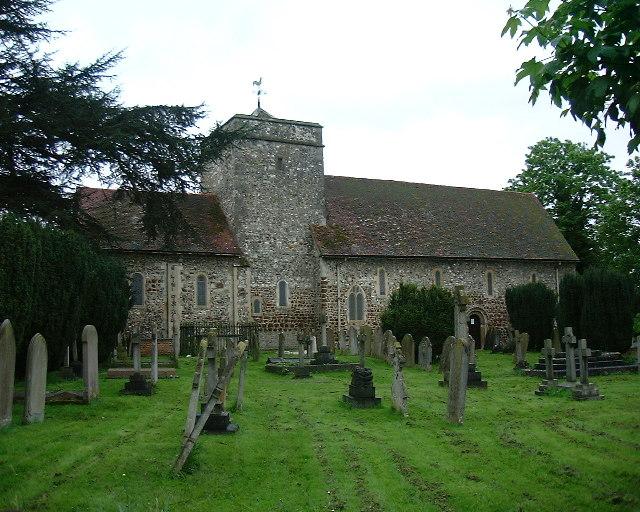
- St. Laurence in Upton, Slough

- Location within Berkshire
- OS grid reference: SU979792
- Unitary authority: Slough
- Ceremonial county: Berkshire
- Region: South East
- Country: England
- Sovereign state: United Kingdom
- Post town: SLOUGH
- Postcode district: SL1
- Dialling code: 01753
- Police: Thames Valley
- Fire: Royal Berkshire
- Ambulance: South Central
- UK Parliament: Slough

Upton is a suburb of Slough, in the Slough district, in the ceremonial county of Berkshire, England. Until the local government reforms of 1974 it was in Buckinghamshire. It was one of the villages that developed into the town.

== History ==
The Domesday Book survey of 1086 refers to Upton and a wood for 200 pigs, worth £15. Upton took its name from its situation at the top of the slope from the river terrace — the various levels in the area having been formed in the Last Ice Age.

The ancient parish, and the civil parish until 1894, included Chalvey and Slough, originally hamlets, and was formally known as Upton-cum-Chalvey. In 1894, the new civil parish of Slough was formed from the parish. In 1895 a detached part of the parish was transferred to Gerrards Cross, and in 1900 and 1901 the rump of the parish was divided between the neighbouring parishes of Eton, Langley, Slough and Wexham. The ecclesiastical parish is still known as Upton-cum-Chalvey.

== Church ==
Upton's Norman Church, St Laurence's Church, is around 900 years old. It was the marriage place (7 May 1788) and burial place (1822) of Sir William Herschel (in whose memory there stands a newly erected stained-glass window depicting Uranus, which he discovered, and other planets), and the burial place of Charles Hatchett who discovered niobium.

== Other buildings ==
Upton Court is the name of the original manorial buildings for the parish of Upton. Parts of Upton Court were built in 1325. In the 19th century, it was a seat of the Burton family and was, up until March 2010, home to the Slough Observer newspaper. The nearby Slough Grammar School, having previously been named Upton Grammar School from 1982 to 1993, changed its name in 2013 to Upton Court Grammar School.

The Mere is a 19th-century half-timbered building, built in 1887 by the grandson of Richard Bentley, is now the head office of the National Foundation for Educational Research. Long Close School was established in the area in 1940.

== Upton Park ==
Upton Park forms one of Slough's earliest planned estates. Laid out in 1842, the grounds (a public park as Herschel Park since 1949) are believed to have been designed by Joseph Paxton.

In 2011, the 3.5-hectare (8.6-acre) Grade II listed park and nature reserve underwent a restoration project to re-establish the area to its former Victorian glory with a lottery grant of £2.7m from the Heritage Lottery Fund. Friends of Herschel Park, a local conservation group, was created to manage the restoration, as well as to oversee the design and maintenance of the area. The park regularly holds events for adults and children throughout the year.

== Notable people ==
- Thomas Case (1871–1941), cricketer and brewer
