= Lydia Simmons =

English former politician

Lydia Emelda Simmons OBE is a Labour Party local politician in Slough, Berkshire, England who was active between 1979 and 2007. She has the distinction of being the first black person, as well as specifically the first Afro-Caribbean woman, to become a mayor in England. By the end of her tenure as Councillor on Slough Borough Council (1979 - 1994 and 1999 - 2007), she was the longest-serving member of the council. She was born in Montserrat, a small volcanic island in the Caribbean.

== Offices ==
=== 1979 - 1994 ===
- Councillor on Slough Borough Council (1979 - 1994)
- Deputy Mayor of Slough (1983 - 1984)
- Mayor of Slough (1984 - 1985)
- Chair of the council committee responsible for housing (1985 - 1994)

=== 1999 - 2007 ===
- Councillor on Slough Borough Council (1999 - 2007)
- Cabinet commissioner (1999 - 2004), Simmons became shadow commissioner for Housing, after Labour went into opposition in 2004.
  - Social Exclusion (1999 - 2002)
  - Neighbourhood Services (2002 - 2004)
  - Shadow Commissioner for Housing (2004), after Labour went into opposition.
- Member of the Board of People 1st Slough (2006), which ran public housing in Slough as an arms length management organisation (ALMO).

== Disputed 2007 election ==
At the 2007 Slough Council election, Simmons was the Labour candidate in Central Ward. She was unexpectedly defeated by the Conservative candidate, Eshaq Khan, in circumstances which led to an election petition being presented challenging the result. An election commissioner, on 18 March 2008, ruled the election void because of registration and postal vote fraud; Khan was expelled from the Conservative Party. Simmons did not contest the by-election caused by the court decision. It was only when Labour party activists, surprised by the Conservative victory in an election otherwise a success for Labour, pressed for an investigation that the fraud was discovered, the hearing was told.

"The only reasons they came to light at all were the incompetence of the fraudsters and the blatant nature of the frauds."

— Commissioner Richard Mawry

== See also ==
- List of mayors of Slough
- Brenda Dacres, first black woman directly elected mayor
