= Chalvey =

Coordinates: 51.5066°N 0.6102°W

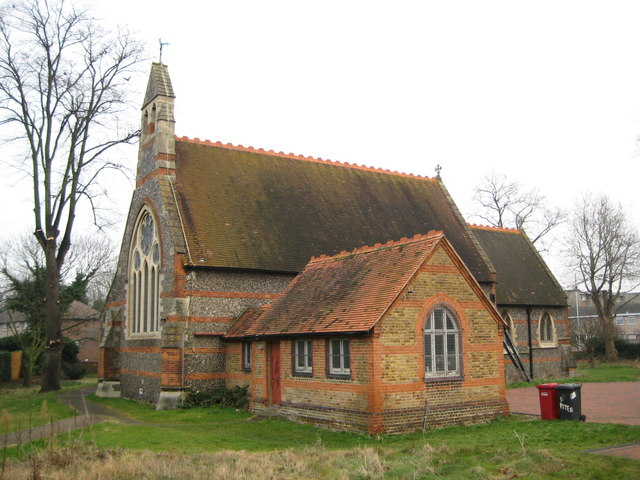
- St Peter's Church

- Location within Berkshire
- OS grid reference: SU965795
- Unitary authority: Slough
- Ceremonial county: Berkshire
- Region: South East
- Country: England
- Sovereign state: United Kingdom
- Post town: Slough
- Postcode district: SL3
- Dialling code: 01753
- Police: Thames Valley
- Fire: Royal Berkshire
- Ambulance: South Central
- UK Parliament: Slough

Chalvey (/ˈtʃɑːrvi/) is a former village, which is now a suburb of Slough, in the unitary authority of Slough in Berkshire, England. It was transferred to Berkshire from Buckinghamshire in 1974.

It was first recorded in 1217 by an Old English word meaning "Calf Island", from Cealf meaning calf. As the name implies, Chalvey lies low on the plain of the River Thames, and there may have been enough of a rise for an island to stand above the slough from which the later town takes its name.

Chalvey has never formed a parish on its own, being twinned with Upton in the parish of Upton-cum-Chalvey.

As Slough developed, Chalvey developed as a working-class community of small terraced houses. Nonconformist churches were established starting with the Congregationalists in 1806.

In 1849, the Slough to Windsor railway was built, passing through the middle of Chalvey. A halt was opened by the Great Western Railway in 1929 but closed the following year.

At some point between 1850 and 1880, a local legend developed about the "Chalvey Stab Monkey" involving an organ grinder and a stabbed monkey; the first person to get blind drunk on the anniversary of the monkey's funeral is declared "Mayor of Chalvey". Traditionally, residents of Chalvey have been known as "stab-monks". A long-standing local joke suggests that Chalvey's main industry is in the Treacle Mines. On occasion, this has been taken to be a reference to the local sewage works.

It was stated on the "Immigration - How We Lost Count" edition of the BBC1 documentary Panorama on 23 July 2007 that Chalvey is severely overcrowded, and that most of its residents are immigrants and members of ethnic minorities. Chalvey has a large Asian population.

Religion in Chalvey (2021)
1. Muslim (42.7%)
2. Christian (28.8%)
3. Hindu (6.5%)
4. Sikh (5.2%)
5. Buddhist (0.5%)
6. Other (0.4%)
7. Irreligious (15.9%)

The first recorded Lord of the Manor of Chalvey was recorded in the year 1502. The current Lord of Chalvey, Christopher Johnson, lives in the United States.
