= Britwellian =

Political party in Slough, England

Britwellian is the name chosen by two local political groups, which have contested elections in the three member Britwell Ward of Slough Borough Council. The regular Council elections in Slough are normally for a third of the council, with one seat contested in each ward. The 2004 election was for the whole Council, following boundary changes. The Britwellian Group were a registered political party founded in 2002 by, inter alia, Councillor Mavis L. Gallick, Paul Janik, Sean Wright, Gillan Swan, Dennis Lees and Paula Murphy. Cllr Gallick served as a Britwellian Councillor from 2000 until her death.

After Councillor Gallick's death in 2002, an internal dispute about the 'ownership of the party' forced the majority of members including Paul Janik, Sean Wright, Dennis Lees and Paula Murphy to form a new political party called the Independent Britwellian Residents (IBR). The original Britwellians continued under the leadership of Gillian Swan (Councillor Gallick's daughter) until disbanded in 2004.

== 2002 by-election and after ==
The two groups competed in the Britwell by-election of October 2002 to fill the vacancy caused by Councillor Gallick's death. The IBR candidate Patrick Shine won the seat and the Britwellian candidate came third. No further Britwellian candidates have been nominated.

After the May 2002 local elections, when Councillor Sean Wright joined the ILLD Group (Independents, Liberals and Liberal Democrats) the Group changed its title to the BILLD Group Britwellians, Independents, Liberals and Liberal Democrats.

Britwellian and IBR Councillors have been members of the Britwellian, Independent, Liberal and Liberal Democrats Group on Slough Borough Council.

After the June 2004 elections Councillor Paul Janik did not re-join the BILLD Group. Subsequently, he rejoined for a short period of a few months. He contested the 2006 Slough Council election as a Slough Independents candidate in opposition to the IBR nominee. In 2012, Paul Janik was given a restraining order for harassing Slough Borough Council Chief, Ruth Bagley and Communications Manager, Kate Pratt.

Britwellian candidates

- 2000: Mrs Mavis L. Gallick 417 votes (38.15%) elected
- 2001: Sean Patrick Wright 718 votes (24.16%) runner up
- 2002: Sean Patrick Wright 1,318 votes (79.40%) elected (became IBR 2002)
- 2002 (18 October by-election): O. Isemia 157 votes (17.31%) third

Independent Britwellian Residents candidates

- 2002 (18 October by-election): Patrick Shine 499 votes (53.80%) elected
- 2003 (13 February by-election): Paul Janik 539 votes (63.49%) elected
- 2003: Patrick Shine 946 votes (63.70%) elected
- 2004 (3 seats): Sean Patrick Wright 1,170 votes (24.54%), Patrick Shine 1,157 votes (24.27%), Paul Janik 1,151 votes (24.15%) all elected
