= Shire Hall, Reading =

The Shire Hall, Reading may refer to one of two different buildings in Reading that served as a Shire Hall for Berkshire County Council in the UK:

- Shire Hall, The Forbury, used from 1911 to 1981, now the Roseate Reading Hotel
- Shire Hall, Shinfield Park, used from 1981 to 1998, now offices for Wood Group
