= Dorset County Council elections =

Local government elections in Dorset, England

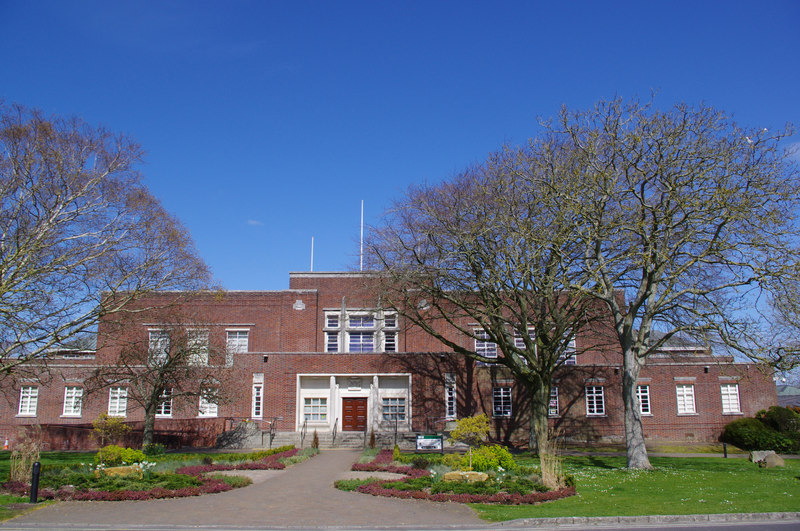
County Hall in Dorchester, headquarters of Dorset County Council

Dorset County Council was a non-metropolitan county in England. Elections were first held on 23 January 1889, thereafter elections were held every three years, with all members being elected by the first past the post system of election on the same day. Later, the cycle was changed to one election in every four years, and the last such election was in 2017. There were also occasional by-elections, the last of which took place in December 2016.

Under the Local Government Act 1972 the non-metropolitan county of Dorset was created from the merger of the administrative county of Dorset and the county borough of Bournemouth. The first elections to the new authority were in April 1973, and the council took office on 1 April 1974. From its creation until 1997, the county council administered the entire area of the ceremonial county of Dorset. Bournemouth and Poole became unitary authorities in 1997, but continued to form part of the county for ceremonial purposes.

The council was abolished on 31 March 2019 as part of structural changes to local government in Dorset.

== County council composition ==
Election	Conservative	Liberal Democrat	Labour	UKIP	Green	Other	Total
1973	59	14	11	0	0	7	91
1977	80	4	4	0	0	3	91
1981	53	16	11	0	0	11	91
1985	42	26	4	0	0	5	77
1989	43	22	6	0	0	6	77
1993	28	38	6	0	0	5	77
1997	15	21	5	0	0	1	42
2001	23	14	4	0	0	1	42
2005	24	16	4	0	0	1	45
2009	28	16	0	0	0	1	45
2013	27	12	5	1	0	0	45
2017	32	11	1	0	2	0	46

== County result maps ==
2005 results map

2009 results map

2013 results map

2017 results map

== By-election results ==
By-elections occur when seats become vacant between council elections. Below is a summary of recent by-elections; full by-election results can be found by clicking on the by-election name.

By-election	Date	Incumbent party	Winning party
Ferndown by-election	6 May 1999	Conservative	Conservative
Corfe Mullen by-election	10 June 2004	Liberal Democrats	Liberal Democrats
Rodwell by-election	12 November 2015	Labour	Green
Sherborne Rural by-election	2 June 2016	Conservative	Liberal Democrats
Ferndown by-election	1 September 2016	Conservative	Conservative
Ferndown by-election	1 December 2016	UKIP	Conservative
Bridport by-election	22 February 2018	Liberal Democrats	Conservative
Ferndown by-election	22 February 2018	Conservative	Conservative
