= 2001 Dorset County Council election =

Local election in Dorset

Elections to Dorset County Council were held on 7 June 2001, alongside other local elections across the United Kingdom. All 42 seats were up for election. The Conservative Party gained the council from no overall control.

== Results summary ==
Results
| Party | Seats before | Seats after | Change |
|---|---|---|---|
| Conservative Party | 15 | 23 | ▲8 |
| Liberal Democrats | 21 | 14 | ▼7 |
| Labour Party | 5 | 4 | ▼1 |
| Independents | 1 | 1 | Steady |

== See also ==
- Dorset County Council elections
