= 1993 Berkshire County Council election =

| ← 1989 | 6 May 1993 |

All 76 seats 39 seats needed for a majority
| | First party | Second party | Third party |
|---|---|---|---|
| Leader | Linda Murray | Lawrence Silverman | Gareth Gimblett |
| Party | Liberal Democrats | Labour | Conservative |
| Seats before | 15 | 19 | 37 |
| Seats after | 33 | 24 | 16 |
| Seat change | ▲18 | ▲5 | ▼21 |
| Popular vote | 92,704 | 47,536 | 84,145 |
| Percentage | 39.3% | 20.2% | 35.7% |
| | Fourth party | Fifth party |
| Party | Liberal | Independent |
| Seats before | 1 | 4 |
| Seats after | 1 | 2 |
| Seat change | Steady | ▼2 |
| Popular vote | 3,580 | 4,878 |
| Percentage | 1.0% | 2.1% |

The 1993 Berkshire County Council election was held on 6 May 1993, at the same time as other local elections across England and Wales. All of Berkshire County Council's 76 seats were up for election.

Prior to the election, the county council had been under no overall control, with a coalition of Labour, the Liberal Democrats and independents running the authority. The Labour leader, Lawrence Silverman, had been leader of the council. After the election, there was still no overall control of the council, but the Liberal Democrats became the largest party. The Conservatives lost over half their seats on the council. It was decided after the election that the coalition would continue, but with the Liberal Democrat leader, Linda Murray, being declared joint leader alongside Lawrence Silverman at the subsequent annual council meeting on 22 May 1993.

The 1993 election turned out to be the final election to Berkshire County Council. It was decided in 1996 to abolish the county council and transfer its functions to the county's six district councils, making them unitary authorities. The elections that would have been held for Berkshire County Council in 1997 were therefore cancelled, with elections being held instead for the six districts that year. Berkshire County Council continued to exist until 31 March 1998, with the new unitary authorities assuming their new powers on 1 April 1998.

== Results summary ==
Berkshire County Council Election, 1993
| Party | Seats | Gains | Losses | Net gain/loss | Seats % | Votes % | Votes | +/− |
|---|---|---|---|---|---|---|---|---|
| Liberal Democrats | 33 | | | +18 | 43.4 | 39.3 | 92,704 | |
| Conservative | 16 | | | -21 | 21.1 | 35.7 | 84,145 | |
| Labour | 24 | | | +5 | 31.6 | 20.2 | 47,536 | |
| Liberal | 1 | | | 0 | 1.3 | 1.5 | 3,580 | |
| Green | 0 | | | | 0.0 | 1.2 | 2,731 | |
| Natural Law | 0 | | | | 0.0 | 0.0 | 74 | |
| Monster Raving Loony | 0 | | | | 0.0 | 0.0 | 64 | |
| Independent | 2 | | | -2 | 2.6 | 2.1 | 4,878 | |

=== Ward results ===
The results in each ward were as follows (candidates with an asterisk* were the previous incumbent standing for re-election):

Abbey ward (Reading)
| Party | Candidate | Votes | % | ±% |
|---|---|---|---|---|
| Labour | Mohammad Iqbal | 1,299 | 57.9 | |
| Conservative | Mark Boyle | 458 | 21.6 | |
| Liberal Democrats | John Wood | 335 | 15.8 | |
| Green | Howard Darby | 100 | 4.7 | |
| Turnout | | | 31.2 | |
| Labour hold | | Swing | | |

Ascot and Sunningdale ward (Windsor and Maidenhead)
| Party | Candidate | Votes | % | ±% |
|---|---|---|---|---|
| Conservative | John Maisey | 1,988 | 64.2 | |
| Liberal Democrats | Sonya Lippold | 851 | 27.5 | |
| Labour | Robert Draper | 259 | 8.4 | |
| Turnout | | | 34.5 | |
| Conservative hold | | Swing | | |

Battle ward (Reading)
| Party | Candidate | Votes | % | ±% |
|---|---|---|---|---|
| Labour | Stuart White* | 1,089 | 61.7 | |
| Conservative | Leslie Crumplin-Hill | 395 | 22.4 | |
| Liberal Democrats | Simon Weinberger | 280 | 15.9 | |
| Turnout | | | 29 | |
| Labour hold | | Swing | | |

Belmont ward (Windsor and Maidenhead)
| Party | Candidate | Votes | % | ±% |
|---|---|---|---|---|
| Liberal Democrats | Andrew Hickley* | 1,320 | 56.3 | |
| Conservative | Dorothy Kemp | 842 | 35.9 | |
| Labour | Nigel Smith | 182 | 7.8 | |
| Turnout | | | 38.6 | |
| Liberal Democrats hold | | Swing | | |

Binfield ward (Bracknell Forest)
| Party | Candidate | Votes | % | ±% |
|---|---|---|---|---|
| Labour | Amanda Williams | 2,005 | 46.7 | |
| Conservative | Ian Leake | 1,607 | 37.4 | |
| Liberal Democrats | Catherine Dickson | 682 | 15.9 | |
| Turnout | | | 43.3 | |
| Labour gain from Conservative | | Swing | | |

Boyn Hill ward (Windsor and Maidenhead)
| Party | Candidate | Votes | % | ±% |
|---|---|---|---|---|
| Liberal Democrats | Edward Clarke | 1,815 | 56.8 | |
| Conservative | John Tryon | 1,216 | 38 | |
| Labour | Victor Longman | 166 | 5.2 | |
| Turnout | | | 43.1 | |
| Liberal Democrats gain from Independent | | Swing | | |

Bradfield ward (Newbury)
| Party | Candidate | Votes | % | ±% |
|---|---|---|---|---|
| Conservative | Elizabeth Still* | 2,226 | 50.1 | |
| Liberal Democrats | Keith Lock | 2,014 | 45.3 | |
| Labour | Leslie Champ | 160 | 3.6 | |
| Natural Law | John Buckley | 42 | 0.9 | |
| Turnout | | | 70.4 | |
| Conservative hold | | Swing | | |

Bray ward (Windsor and Maidenhead)
| Party | Candidate | Votes | % | ±% |
|---|---|---|---|---|
| Independent | Roger Carter | 1,558 | 51.8 | |
| Conservative | Tony Wiseman* | 1,299 | 43.2 | |
| Labour | Kathleen Cutting | 151 | 5 | |
| Turnout | | | 40.2 | |
| Independent gain from Conservative | | Swing | | |

Britwell ward (Slough)
| Party | Candidate | Votes | % | ±% |
|---|---|---|---|---|
| Labour | D. McCarthy* | 1,253 | 73.7 | |
| Liberal Democrats | A. Meredith | 221 | 13 | |
| Liberal | C. Hull | 153 | 9 | |
| Green | D. McDermid | 74 | 4.4 | |
| Turnout | | | 27 | |
| Labour hold | | Swing | | |

Bullbrook ward (Bracknell Forest)
| Party | Candidate | Votes | % | ±% |
|---|---|---|---|---|
| Liberal Democrats | Lesley Boyd | 1,255 | 45.1 | |
| Conservative | David Scott* | 939 | 33.8 | |
| Labour | Graham Firth | 586 | 21.1 | |
| Turnout | | | 38.8 | |
| Liberal Democrats gain from Conservative | | Swing | | |

Bulmershe ward (Wokingham)
| Party | Candidate | Votes | % | ±% |
|---|---|---|---|---|
| Liberal Democrats | Robert Samuel* | 1,501 | 57.5 | |
| Conservative | Ernest Kent | 649 | 24.9 | |
| Labour | Nelson Bland | 460 | 17.6 | |
| Turnout | | | 33.7 | |
| Liberal Democrats hold | | Swing | | |

Burghfield ward (Newbury)
| Party | Candidate | Votes | % | ±% |
|---|---|---|---|---|
| Liberal Democrats | Royce Longton | 3,388 | 57.6 | |
| Conservative | Rosemary Sanders-Rose* | 2,257 | 38.3 | |
| Labour | Charles Wheeler | 242 | 4.1 | |
| Turnout | | | 65.6 | |
| Liberal Democrats gain from Conservative | | Swing | | |

Caversham ward (Reading)
| Party | Candidate | Votes | % | ±% |
|---|---|---|---|---|
| Conservative | Pauline Palmer | 1,675 | 55 | |
| Labour | George Loughlin | 943 | 31 | |
| Liberal Democrats | Maureen Stagg | 336 | 11 | |
| Green | Robert McCubbin | 91 | 3 | |
| Turnout | | | 41 | |
| Conservative hold | | Swing | | |

Chalvey ward (Slough)
| Party | Candidate | Votes | % | ±% |
|---|---|---|---|---|
| Labour | R. Ahmad | 1,189 | 56 | |
| Conservative | A. Ahmad | 530 | 25 | |
| Green | N. Sargeant | 252 | 11.9 | |
| Liberal | J. Thakrar | 152 | 7.2 | |
| Turnout | | | 27.4 | |
| Labour hold | | Swing | | |

Church ward (Reading)
| Party | Candidate | Votes | % | ±% |
|---|---|---|---|---|
| Labour | Chris Goodall* | 1,000 | 63.1 | |
| Conservative | John Kaiser | 420 | 26.5 | |
| Green | Richard Bradbury | 164 | 10.4 | |
| Turnout | | | 29.3 | |
| Labour hold | | Swing | | |

Cippenham ward (Slough)
| Party | Candidate | Votes | % | ±% |
|---|---|---|---|---|
| Labour | F. Bertemes | 1,467 | 46 | |
| Conservative | M. Watts | 1,462 | 45.8 | |
| Liberal | B. Puddefoot | 262 | 8.2 | |
| Turnout | | | 43.3 | |
| Labour hold | | Swing | | |

Clewer ward (Windsor and Maidenhead)
| Party | Candidate | Votes | % | ±% |
|---|---|---|---|---|
| Liberal Democrats | Lee Walton | 1,073 | 39.3 | |
| Labour | Philip Hardcastle* | 871 | 31.9 | |
| Conservative | Donald Kimber | 786 | 28.8 | |
| Turnout | | | 46.4 | |
| Liberal Democrats gain from Labour | | Swing | | |

Cold Ash ward (Newbury)
| Party | Candidate | Votes | % | ±% |
|---|---|---|---|---|
| Liberal Democrats | Christopher Marriage | 4,113 | 67 | |
| Conservative | Grosvenor Chaundy | 1,691 | 27.5 | |
| Labour | Sarah Hutt | 335 | 5.5 | |
| Turnout | | | 67.6 | |
| Liberal Democrats gain from Conservative | | Swing | | |

Cookham, Bisham and Hurley ward (Windsor and Maidenhead)
| Party | Candidate | Votes | % | ±% |
|---|---|---|---|---|
| Liberal Democrats | Henry Donnelly | 1,573 | 48.7 | |
| Conservative | John Clark | 1,457 | 45.1 | |
| Labour | Christine Taylor | 203 | 6.3 | |
| Turnout | | | 46.5 | |
| Liberal Democrats gain from Conservative | | Swing | | |

Cox Green ward (Windsor and Maidenhead)
| Party | Candidate | Votes | % | ±% |
|---|---|---|---|---|
| Liberal Democrats | Jeremy Hyde | 1,991 | 64.3 | |
| Conservative | Cheryl Newby | 951 | 30.7 | |
| Labour | Anthony Randall | 156 | 5 | |
| Turnout | | | 43.6 | |
| Liberal Democrats hold | | Swing | | |

Crowthorne ward (Bracknell Forest)
| Party | Candidate | Votes | % | ±% |
|---|---|---|---|---|
| Liberal Democrats | Ann Risman* | 1,589 | 52.6 | |
| Conservative | Diana Pidgeon | 1,264 | 41.6 | |
| Labour | Graham Vertigen | 167 | 5.5 | |
| Turnout | | | 42.7 | |
| Liberal Democrats hold | | Swing | | |

Datchet, Horton and Wraysbury ward (Windsor and Maidenhead)
| Party | Candidate | Votes | % | ±% |
|---|---|---|---|---|
| Conservative | Pamela Barnes-Taylor | 1,260 | 51.3 | |
| Liberal Democrats | Timothy O'Flynn | 939 | 38.3 | |
| Labour | Jennifer Ward | 255 | 10.4 | |
| Turnout | | | 34.5 | |
| Conservative hold | | Swing | | |

Downlands ward (Newbury)
| Party | Candidate | Votes | % | ±% |
|---|---|---|---|---|
| Liberal Democrats | David Becket | 2,784 | 54.7 | |
| Conservative | Peter Robinson* | 2,157 | 42.4 | |
| Labour | Gaynor Ridd | 152 | 3 | |
| Turnout | | | 69.4 | |
| Liberal Democrats gain from Conservative | | Swing | | |

Easthampstead ward (Bracknell Forest)
| Party | Candidate | Votes | % | ±% |
|---|---|---|---|---|
| Labour | Anne Snelgrove | 1,644 | 54.3 | |
| Conservative | Alan Harrison* | 850 | 28.1 | |
| Liberal Democrats | David Maxwell | 536 | 17.7 | |
| Turnout | | | 49.3 | |
| Labour gain from Conservative | | Swing | | |

Emmbrook ward (Wokingham)
| Party | Candidate | Votes | % | ±% |
|---|---|---|---|---|
| Liberal Democrats | Keith Charlton | 1,575 | 48.9 | |
| Conservative | Patrick Henesey* | 1,329 | 41.3 | |
| Labour | David Grattidge | 314 | 9.8 | |
| Turnout | | | 41.4 | |
| Liberal Democrats gain from Conservative | | Swing | | |

Eton and Castle ward (Windsor and Maidenhead)
| Party | Candidate | Votes | % | ±% |
|---|---|---|---|---|
| Liberal Democrats | James Lennox | 1,420 | 53.2 | |
| Conservative | Peter Smith | 989 | 37 | |
| Labour | Leonard Jones | 261 | 9.8 | |
| Turnout | | | 42 | |
| Liberal Democrats gain from Independent | | Swing | | |

Evendons ward (Wokingham)
| Party | Candidate | Votes | % | ±% |
|---|---|---|---|---|
| Liberal Democrats | John Albinson* | 2,007 | 59.3 | |
| Conservative | Lynne Griffith | 1,240 | 36.7 | |
| Labour | Karen Livingstone | 136 | 4 | |
| Turnout | | | 40.8 | |
| Liberal Democrats hold | | Swing | | |

Falkland ward (Newbury)
| Party | Candidate | Votes | % | ±% |
|---|---|---|---|---|
| Liberal Democrats | Robert Mowatt | 3,698 | 63.5 | |
| Conservative | Richard Evans | 1,694 | 29.1 | |
| Labour | Gerald Orbell | 260 | 4.5 | |
| Green | Bruce Bamber | 136 | 2.3 | |
| Natural Law | Michael Grenville | 32 | 0.5 | |
| Turnout | | | 72.5 | |
| Liberal Democrats hold | | Swing | | |

Farnham ward (Slough)
| Party | Candidate | Votes | % | ±% |
|---|---|---|---|---|
| Labour | M. Khan | 1,418 | 59.3 | |
| Liberal Democrats | A. Young | 503 | 21 | |
| Liberal | N. Malik | 469 | 19.6 | |
| Turnout | | | 32.6 | |
| Labour hold | | Swing | | |

Finchampstead ward (Wokingham)
| Party | Candidate | Votes | % | ±% |
|---|---|---|---|---|
| Conservative | Martin Stubbs | 1,476 | 58 | |
| Liberal Democrats | James Parker | 767 | 30.2 | |
| Labour | Owen Waite | 175 | 6.9 | |
| Independent | Arthur Shone | 125 | 4.9 | |
| Turnout | | | 31.8 | |
| Conservative hold | | Swing | | |

Furze Platt and Pinkneys Green ward (Windsor and Maidenhead)
| Party | Candidate | Votes | % | ±% |
|---|---|---|---|---|
| Liberal Democrats | Simon Werner | 2,140 | 64.8 | |
| Conservative | William Brack* | 998 | 30.2 | |
| Labour | Thomas Beaton | 164 | 5 | |
| Turnout | | | 44.3 | |
| Liberal Democrats gain from Conservative | | Swing | | |

Great Hollands ward (Bracknell Forest)
| Party | Candidate | Votes | % | ±% |
|---|---|---|---|---|
| Labour | Alan Winter | 1,195 | 42.3 | |
| Conservative | Arthur Thomson* | 1,099 | 38.9 | |
| Liberal Democrats | Graham Ford | 529 | 18.7 | |
| Turnout | | | 38.6 | |
| Labour gain from Conservative | | Swing | | |

Great Park ward (Windsor and Maidenhead)
| Party | Candidate | Votes | % | ±% |
|---|---|---|---|---|
| Liberal Democrats | Christopher Bushill | 1,653 | 65 | |
| Conservative | Margaret Eatock | 724 | 28.4 | |
| Labour | David Drye | 168 | 6.6 | |
| Turnout | | | 41.2 | |
| Liberal Democrats hold | | Swing | | |

Greenham ward (Newbury)
| Party | Candidate | Votes | % | ±% |
|---|---|---|---|---|
| Liberal Democrats | Richard James | 3,896 | 69.2 | |
| Conservative | Dominic Barnes | 1,375 | 24.4 | |
| Labour | Christopher Gallon | 194 | 3.4 | |
| Green | Valerie Oldaker | 164 | 2.9 | |
| Turnout | | | 71.6 | |
| Liberal Democrats hold | | Swing | | |

Hanworth ward (Bracknell Forest)
| Party | Candidate | Votes | % | ±% |
|---|---|---|---|---|
| Labour | Tom Wheaton | 1,075 | 42.7 | |
| Conservative | Jean Wallace* | 976 | 38.8 | |
| Liberal Democrats | Philip Bristow | 465 | 18.5 | |
| Turnout | | | 42.3 | |
| Labour gain from Conservative | | Swing | | |

Harmans Water ward (Bracknell Forest)
| Party | Candidate | Votes | % | ±% |
|---|---|---|---|---|
| Conservative | Terry Mills* | 1,009 | 42.6 | |
| Labour | John Jackson | 760 | 32.1 | |
| Liberal Democrats | Richard Mills | 598 | 25.3 | |
| Turnout | | | 37.8 | |
| Conservative hold | | Swing | | |

Haymill ward (Slough)
| Party | Candidate | Votes | % | ±% |
|---|---|---|---|---|
| Liberal | A. Bradshaw* | 1,386 | 60.3 | |
| Labour | J. Dawson | 430 | 18.7 | |
| Conservative | M. Smith | 338 | 14.7 | |
| Liberal Democrats | R. Van Wijk | 92 | 4 | |
| Green | J. Ingram | 53 | 2.3 | |
| Turnout | | | 37.3 | |
| Liberal hold | | Swing | | |

Hungerford ward (Newbury)
| Party | Candidate | Votes | % | ±% |
|---|---|---|---|---|
| Liberal Democrats | Paul Hannon | 2,828 | 54.3 | |
| Conservative | Heather Turner | 2,169 | 41.6 | |
| Green | James Wallis | 211 | 4.1 | |
| Turnout | | | 68.5 | |
| Liberal Democrats gain from Conservative | | Swing | | |

Hurst ward (Wokingham)
| Party | Candidate | Votes | % | ±% |
|---|---|---|---|---|
| Conservative | Robert Turner* | 1,286 | 53.9 | |
| Liberal Democrats | Kenneth Kerr | 907 | 38 | |
| Labour | Colin Stamp | 191 | 8 | |
| Turnout | | | 34.4 | |
| Conservative hold | | Swing | | |

Katesgrove ward (Reading)
| Party | Candidate | Votes | % | ±% |
|---|---|---|---|---|
| Labour | Joe Williams* | 902 | 58.4 | |
| Conservative | Simon Beckingham | 311 | 20.1 | |
| Liberal Democrats | Mark Gray | 271 | 17.5 | |
| Green | John Gooch | 61 | 3.9 | |
| Turnout | | | 26.5 | |
| Labour hold | | Swing | | |

Kentwood ward (Reading)
| Party | Candidate | Votes | % | ±% |
|---|---|---|---|---|
| Liberal Democrats | Mike Bonney | 1,525 | 57.4 | |
| Conservative | Jack Irwin* | 1,035 | 39 | |
| Green | John Willis | 97 | 3.7 | |
| Turnout | | | 40.8 | |
| Liberal Democrats gain from Conservative | | Swing | | |

Lambourn Valley ward (Newbury)
| Party | Candidate | Votes | % | ±% |
|---|---|---|---|---|
| Liberal Democrats | John Warr | 2,604 | 54 | |
| Conservative | David Liddiard | 1,991 | 41.3 | |
| Labour | Christine Hopkins | 225 | 4.7 | |
| Turnout | | | 67.7 | |
| Liberal Democrats gain from Conservative | | Swing | | |

Langley East ward (Slough)
| Party | Candidate | Votes | % | ±% |
|---|---|---|---|---|
| Labour | B. Whiteley* | 1,503 | 58.8 | |
| Conservative | M. Long | 743 | 29.1 | |
| Liberal Democrats | S. Jenkins | 238 | 9.3 | |
| Liberal | S. Reynolds | 72 | 2.8 | |
| Turnout | | | 34.2 | |
| Labour hold | | Swing | | |

Langley West ward (Slough)
| Party | Candidate | Votes | % | ±% |
|---|---|---|---|---|
| Labour | R. Webb* | 1,459 | 62.8 | |
| Conservative | A. Andrews | 559 | 24.1 | |
| Liberal | K. Smith | 226 | 9.7 | |
| Green | P. Whitmore | 80 | 3.4 | |
| Turnout | | | 32 | |
| Labour hold | | Swing | | |

Little Hungerford ward (Wokingham)
| Party | Candidate | Votes | % | ±% |
|---|---|---|---|---|
| Liberal Democrats | David Swindells* | 1,534 | 49.1 | |
| Conservative | Paul Lomax | 1,337 | 42.8 | |
| Labour | Kathleen Davis | 254 | 8.1 | |
| Turnout | | | 40.6 | |
| Liberal Democrats hold | | Swing | | |

Loddon ward (Wokingham)
| Party | Candidate | Votes | % | ±% |
|---|---|---|---|---|
| Liberal Democrats | Cecil Trembath* | 1,842 | 61.1 | |
| Conservative | William Henderson | 879 | 29.1 | |
| Labour | John Goodman | 295 | 9.8 | |
| Turnout | | | 31.8 | |
| Liberal Democrats hold | | Swing | | |

Minster ward (Reading)
| Party | Candidate | Votes | % | ±% |
|---|---|---|---|---|
| Labour | June Orton | 1,398 | 48.7 | |
| Conservative | Wendy Wates | 1,054 | 36.7 | |
| Liberal Democrats | Roger Hayes | 337 | 11.7 | |
| Green | Timothy Astin | 86 | 2.8 | |
| Turnout | | | 43.1 | |
| Labour gain from Conservative | | Swing | | |

Norcot ward (Reading)
| Party | Candidate | Votes | % | ±% |
|---|---|---|---|---|
| Labour | Peter Jones* | 1,284 | 57.4 | |
| Liberal Democrats | Ricky Duveen | 454 | 20.3 | |
| Conservative | Clarence Mortimer | 430 | 19.2 | |
| Green | David Chaplin | 69 | 3.1 | |
| Turnout | | | 33.6 | |
| Labour hold | | Swing | | |

Old Windsor and Sunninghill ward (Windsor and Maidenhead)
| Party | Candidate | Votes | % | ±% |
|---|---|---|---|---|
| Independent | Arthur Hartley* | 2,117 | 71.3 | |
| Conservative | Christine Bateson | 851 | 28.7 | |
| Turnout | | | 44.2 | |
| Independent hold | | Swing | | |

Oldfield ward (Windsor and Maidenhead)
| Party | Candidate | Votes | % | ±% |
|---|---|---|---|---|
| Conservative | Donald Cunliffe* | 926 | 39.7 | |
| Labour | Alan Cutting | 810 | 34.7 | |
| Liberal Democrats | Alan Doman | 597 | 25.6 | |
| Turnout | | | 39.8 | |
| Conservative hold | | Swing | | |

Pangbourne ward (Newbury)
| Party | Candidate | Votes | % | ±% |
|---|---|---|---|---|
| Conservative | Frank Lewis* | 1,931 | 55.7 | |
| Liberal Democrats | Sheila Macro | 1,345 | 38.8 | |
| Labour | Christopher Ardy | 191 | 5.5 | |
| Turnout | | | 45.1 | |
| Conservative hold | | Swing | | |

Park ward (Reading)
| Party | Candidate | Votes | % | ±% |
|---|---|---|---|---|
| Labour | Adrian Hutton* | 1,492 | 62.1 | |
| Conservative | Rajinder Kalsi | 527 | 21.9 | |
| Liberal Democrats | Susan Doughty | 298 | 12.4 | |
| Green | Phillip Unsworth | 87 | 3.6 | |
| Turnout | | | 38.5 | |
| Labour hold | | Swing | | |

Peppard ward (Reading)
| Party | Candidate | Votes | % | ±% |
|---|---|---|---|---|
| Conservative | Gareth Gimblett* | 1,351 | 46.9 | |
| Liberal Democrats | Ian Fenwick | 1,178 | 40.9 | |
| Labour | Graeme St Clair | 352 | 12.2 | |
| Turnout | | | 39.1 | |
| Conservative hold | | Swing | | |

Redhatch ward (Wokingham)
| Party | Candidate | Votes | % | ±% |
|---|---|---|---|---|
| Liberal Democrats | Paul Simon | 2,191 | 54.8 | |
| Conservative | Gerald Hughes | 1,508 | 37.7 | |
| Labour | Paul Royle | 234 | 5.9 | |
| Monster Raving Loony | Peter Owen | 64 | 1.6 | |
| Turnout | | | 34.4 | |
| Liberal Democrats gain from Conservative | | Swing | | |

Redlands ward (Reading)
| Party | Candidate | Votes | % | ±% |
|---|---|---|---|---|
| Labour | John Howarth | 1,453 | 58.2 | |
| Conservative | Sri Kochmae | 570 | 22.8 | |
| Liberal Democrats | Jeremy Lazenby | 366 | 14.7 | |
| Green | Mary Westley | 108 | 4.3 | |
| Turnout | | | 33.5 | |
| Labour hold | | Swing | | |

Salt Hill ward (Slough)
| Party | Candidate | Votes | % | ±% |
|---|---|---|---|---|
| Labour | D. Peters* | 1,201 | 52.5 | |
| Conservative | M. Khan | 505 | 22.1 | |
| Liberal | K. Bansal | 349 | 15.3 | |
| Liberal Democrats | C. Tucker | 150 | 6.6 | |
| Green | M. McSheehy | 81 | 3.5 | |
| Turnout | | | 30.6 | |
| Labour hold | | Swing | | |

Sandhurst ward (Bracknell Forest)
| Party | Candidate | Votes | % | ±% |
|---|---|---|---|---|
| Liberal Democrats | Linda Murray* | 2,498 | 57.1 | |
| Conservative | David Worrall | 1,641 | 37.5 | |
| Labour | Sylvia Trevis | 234 | 5.4 | |
| Turnout | | | 41.1 | |
| Liberal Democrats hold | | Swing | | |

Slough Central ward (Slough)
| Party | Candidate | Votes | % | ±% |
|---|---|---|---|---|
| Labour | D. Beer* | 1,317 | 56.4 | |
| Conservative | R. Chauhan | 715 | 30.6 | |
| Liberal Democrats | G. Griffin | 163 | 7 | |
| Green | D. Dean | 79 | 3.4 | |
| Liberal | B. Sanders | 61 | 2.6 | |
| Turnout | | | 42.5 | |
| Labour hold | | Swing | | |

Sonning ward (Wokingham)
| Party | Candidate | Votes | % | ±% |
|---|---|---|---|---|
| Liberal Democrats | Michael Storm | 1,515 | 46.5 | |
| Conservative | John Whitwell* | 1,411 | 43.3 | |
| Labour | Elizabeth Vincent | 333 | 10.2 | |
| Turnout | | | 40.9 | |
| Liberal Democrats gain from Conservative | | Swing | | |

Southcote ward (Reading)
| Party | Candidate | Votes | % | ±% |
|---|---|---|---|---|
| Labour | Pete Ruhemann* | 1,680 | 62.9 | |
| Conservative | Deryck Morton | 655 | 24.5 | |
| Liberal Democrats | Nicolas Lawson | 291 | 10.9 | |
| Green | Joseph Loudon | 43 | 1.6 | |
| Turnout | | | 42.5 | |
| Labour hold | | Swing | | |

Speenhamland ward (Newbury)
| Party | Candidate | Votes | % | ±% |
|---|---|---|---|---|
| Liberal Democrats | Deborah King* | 2,900 | 67.7 | |
| Conservative | Jean Waterson | 1,062 | 24.8 | |
| Labour | Jon Bosley | 210 | 4.9 | |
| Green | P. Cooper | 110 | 2.6 | |
| Turnout | | | 66.4 | |
| Liberal Democrats hold | | Swing | | |

St Mary's ward (Windsor and Maidenhead)
| Party | Candidate | Votes | % | ±% |
|---|---|---|---|---|
| Liberal Democrats | George Mair | 1,338 | 54 | |
| Conservative | Keith Whittle* | 994 | 40.1 | |
| Labour | Ian Harvey | 146 | 5.9 | |
| Turnout | | | 43.4 | |
| Liberal Democrats gain from Conservative | | Swing | | |

Swallowfield ward (Wokingham)
| Party | Candidate | Votes | % | ±% |
|---|---|---|---|---|
| Conservative | Sarah Palmer* | 1,605 | 65.6 | |
| Labour | Philip Hawkins | 842 | 34.4 | |
| Turnout | | | 35 | |
| Conservative hold | | Swing | | |

Thames ward (Reading)
| Party | Candidate | Votes | % | ±% |
|---|---|---|---|---|
| Conservative | Victor Angell | 1,507 | 47 | |
| Independent | Hamza Fuad* | 1,078 | 33.7 | |
| Labour | Helen Hathaway | 432 | 13.5 | |
| Green | Anne McCubbin | 186 | 5.8 | |
| Turnout | | | 49.9 | |
| Conservative gain from Independent | | Swing | | |

Thatcham ward (Newbury)
| Party | Candidate | Votes | % | ±% |
|---|---|---|---|---|
| Liberal Democrats | Mark Clark | 5,040 | 71.1 | |
| Conservative | Robin Russell | 1,700 | 24 | |
| Labour | Brian Chennell | 344 | 4.9 | |
| Turnout | | | 65.6 | |
| Liberal Democrats hold | | Swing | | |

Theale ward (Newbury)
| Party | Candidate | Votes | % | ±% |
|---|---|---|---|---|
| Conservative | Pearl Slatter* | 1,785 | 44.4 | |
| Liberal Democrats | Alan Macro | 1,700 | 42.3 | |
| Labour | Robert Bastin | 533 | 13.3 | |
| Turnout | | | 40.8 | |
| Conservative hold | | Swing | | |

Tilehurst Central ward (Reading)
| Party | Candidate | Votes | % | ±% |
|---|---|---|---|---|
| Liberal Democrats | Jim Day* | 1,682 | 64.7 | |
| Conservative | Pete Argyle | 535 | 20.6 | |
| Labour | John Dowson | 339 | 13 | |
| Green | Judith Green | 42 | 1.6 | |
| Turnout | | | 40.1 | |
| Liberal Democrats hold | | Swing | | |

Tilehurst West ward (Newbury)
| Party | Candidate | Votes | % | ±% |
|---|---|---|---|---|
| Liberal Democrats | Jean Gardner | 2,021 | 68.9 | |
| Conservative | Peter Gibson* | 914 | 31.1 | |
| Turnout | | | 35.6 | |
| Liberal Democrats gain from Conservative | | Swing | | |

Trinity ward (Windsor and Maidenhead)
| Party | Candidate | Votes | % | ±% |
|---|---|---|---|---|
| Liberal Democrats | Edwin Singer* | 1,713 | 63.4 | |
| Conservative | Edwin Waddleton | 729 | 27 | |
| Labour | Frederick Price | 258 | 9.6 | |
| Turnout | | | 45.3 | |
| Liberal Democrats hold | | Swing | | |

Twyford ward (Wokingham)
| Party | Candidate | Votes | % | ±% |
|---|---|---|---|---|
| Liberal Democrats | Deidre Tomlin | 1,672 | 49.3 | |
| Conservative | Simon Etheridge | 1,464 | 43.1 | |
| Labour | Charles Wickenden | 258 | 7.6 | |
| Turnout | | | 39.5 | |
| Liberal Democrats gain from Conservative | | Swing | | |

Upton ward (Slough)
| Party | Candidate | Votes | % | ±% |
|---|---|---|---|---|
| Labour | J. Connolly | 1,021 | 42.8 | |
| Conservative | J. Manisier* | 897 | 37.6 | |
| Green | W. Carter | 302 | 12.7 | |
| Liberal | P. Bradshaw | 167 | 7 | |
| Turnout | | | 43 | |
| Labour gain from Conservative | | Swing | | |

Westcott ward (Wokingham)
| Party | Candidate | Votes | % | ±% |
|---|---|---|---|---|
| Conservative | Peter Edwards* | 1,186 | 47.6 | |
| Liberal Democrats | Philip Smith | 983 | 39.5 | |
| Labour | Andrew Donelan | 322 | 12.9 | |
| Turnout | | | 37.5 | |
| Conservative hold | | Swing | | |

Wexham Lea ward (Slough)
| Party | Candidate | Votes | % | ±% |
|---|---|---|---|---|
| Labour | P. Sohal* | 1,274 | 53.3 | |
| Liberal Democrats | D. MacIsaac | 427 | 17.9 | |
| Conservative | D. Boatman | 352 | 14.7 | |
| Liberal | D. Long | 283 | 11.8 | |
| Green | J. Edmonds | 55 | 2.3 | |
| Turnout | | | 40.2 | |
| Labour hold | | Swing | | |

Whitley ward (Reading)
| Party | Candidate | Votes | % | ±% |
|---|---|---|---|---|
| Labour | Lawrence Silverman* | 1,180 | 76 | |
| Conservative | Derek Ching | 372 | 24 | |
| Turnout | | | 23.7 | |
| Labour hold | | Swing | | |

Winkfield ward (Bracknell Forest)
| Party | Candidate | Votes | % | ±% |
|---|---|---|---|---|
| Conservative | Maurice Tomkinson* | 1,556 | 50.8 | |
| Liberal Democrats | Robert Jones | 991 | 32.3 | |
| Labour | David Miller | 517 | 16.9 | |
| Turnout | | | 29.8 | |
| Conservative hold | | Swing | | |

Wokingham Without ward (Wokingham)
| Party | Candidate | Votes | % | ±% |
|---|---|---|---|---|
| Conservative | John Trimming* | 1,476 | 50.7 | |
| Liberal Democrats | Alison Berkley | 1,166 | 40.1 | |
| Labour | Mary Gascoyne | 268 | 9.2 | |
| Turnout | | | 31 | |
| Conservative hold | | Swing | | |
