= 2017 Dorset County Council election =

2017 UK local government election

← 2013	4 May 2017

All 46 seats to Dorset County Council 24 seats needed for a majority
	First party	Second party
Party	Conservative	Liberal Democrats
Last election	27 seats, 38.9%	12 seats, 18.5%
Seats won	32	11
Seat change	▲5	▼1
Popular vote	82,511	37,850
Percentage	53.8%	24.7%
Swing	▲14.9%	▲6.2%
	Third party	Fourth party
Party	Green	Labour
Last election	0 seats, 3.7%	5 seats, 12.3%
Seats won	2	1
Seat change	▲2	▼4
Popular vote	7,146	18,587
Percentage	4.7%	12.1%
Swing	▲1.0%	▼0.2%
- Map of the results of the 2017 Dorset council election.
Council control before election
Conservative
Council control after election
Conservative

The 2017 Dorset County Council election took place on 4 May 2017 as part of the 2017 local elections in the United Kingdom. All 46 councillors were elected from 40 electoral divisions, which returned either one or two county councillors each by first-past-the-post voting for a four-year term of office.

Boundary changes to the electoral divisions, saw an increase in councillors from 45 to 46 and decrease in electoral wards from 42 to 40, took effect at this election after a review of the county by the Local Government Boundary Commission for England.

== Election result summary ==
Dorset County Council election, 2017
Party	Candidates						Votes		
Party	Stood	Elected	Gained	Unseated	Net	% of total	%	No.	Net %
Conservative	46	32	–	–	▲5	69.6%	53.8%	82,511	▲14.9%
Liberal Democrats	37	11	–	–	▼1	23.9%	24.7%	37,850	▲6.2%
Green	19	2	–	–	▲2	4.3%	4.7%	7,146	▼1%
Labour	45	1	–	–	▼4	2.2%	12.1%	18,587	▼0.2%
UKIP	21	0	–	–	▼1	0%	4.1%	6,286	▼19.2%
Independent	3	0	–	–	Steady	0%	0.7%	1,006	▼2.2%

== Election result by division ==
=== Beaminster ===
Beaminster
Party	Candidate	Votes	%	±%
Conservative	Rebecca Knox *	2,018	62.8	+9.0
Liberal Democrats	Peter James Allen	848	26.4	+7.4
Labour	Mark Gage	178	5.5	–0.3
Green	Neil Antony Judd	170	5.3	–0.5
Majority		1,170	36.4	+1.6
Turnout			46.27	+2.67
Conservative hold		Swing		

=== Blackmore Vale ===
Blackmore Vale
Party	Candidate	Votes	%	±%
Conservative	Pauline Hannah Batstone *	1,980	71.2	+16.7
Liberal Democrats	David Tibbles	405	14.6	N/A
UKIP	Bill Woodhouse	209	7.5	–26.0
Labour	Robert Zachary Taylor	185	6.7	–5.3
Majority		1,575	56.7	+35.7
Turnout			39.90	+5.48
Conservative hold		Swing		

=== Blandford Forum ===
Blandford Forum
Party	Candidate	Votes	%	±%
Conservative	Byron Robert Quayle	1,086	43.0	+14.1
Liberal Democrats	Barrie George Cooper *	1,035	40.9	+5.2
Labour	Pat Osborne	291	11.5	–1.0
UKIP	Jane Mary Unwin	116	4.6	–18.4
Majority		51	2.0	N/A
Turnout			35.10	+4.41
Conservative gain from Liberal Democrats		Swing		

=== Bridport ===
Bridport (2 seats)
Party	Candidate	Votes	%	±%
Liberal Democrats	Ros Kayes *	2,490	38.3	+4.9
Conservative	Keith Day	2,415	37.2	+11.5
Conservative	Mark Roberts	2,244	–	
Liberal Democrats	Sarah Horniman	1,840	–	
Green	Kevin Clayton	810	12.5	+5.2
Labour	Phylida Culpin	783	12.0	–3.6
Labour	Bill Mellish	690	–	
Green	Robert Casey	490	–	
Turnout			42.69	+8.49
Liberal Democrats hold		Swing		
Conservative win (new seat)				

=== Broadwey ===
Broadwey
Party	Candidate	Votes	%	±%
Conservative	Kevin Brookes	1,128	45.4	+5.2
Labour	Mark Richard Tewkesbury *	904	36.4	–5.7
Liberal Democrats	Ryan Dean Hope	283	11.4	N/A
Green	David Howard Smith	168	6.8	–11.0
Majority		224	9.0	N/A
Turnout			35.30	+6.18
Conservative gain from Labour		Swing		

=== Burton Grange ===
Burton Grange
Party	Candidate	Votes	%	±%
Conservative	David Charles Jones *	1,374	65.6	+22.2
Liberal Democrats	Jade Bailey	366	17.5	N/A
Labour	Antoinette Pearce	353	16.9	–4.0
Majority		1,008	48.2	+40.5
Turnout			27.95	–0.31
Conservative hold		Swing		

=== Chickerell and Chesil Bank ===
Chickerell and Chesil Bank
Party	Candidate	Votes	%	±%
Conservative	Jean Dunseith	1,624	65.5	+32.9
Liberal Democrats	James Alexander Lane Canning	348	14.0	–7.8
Labour	Lynda Ann Kiss	283	11.4	–0.1
Green	Carol Rosemary Byrom	226	9.4	+3.4
Majority		1,276	51.4	+47.0
Turnout			35.30	+2.30
Conservative hold		Swing		

=== Christchurch Central ===
Christchurch Central
Party	Candidate	Votes	%	±%
Conservative	Peter Roger Alexander Hall *	1,707	74.7	+34.5
Labour	Julian Spurr	578	25.3	+15.3
Majority		1,129	49.4	+45.8
Turnout			30.58	–14.01
Conservative hold		Swing		

=== Colehill East and Stapehill ===
Colehill East and Stapehill
Party	Candidate	Votes	%	±%
Liberal Democrats	Janet Dover *	1,342	47.8	N/A
Conservative	KD Johnson	1,100	39.2	N/A
UKIP	Paul Graham	217	7.7	N/A
Labour	Ashley Wynne Rowlands	146	5.2	N/A
Majority		242	8.6	N/A
Turnout			36.36	N/A
Liberal Democrats win (new seat)				

=== Colehill West and Wimborne Minster ===
Colehill West and Wimborne Minster
Party	Candidate	Votes	%	±%
Liberal Democrats	Shane Bartlett	1,190	38.8	N/A
Conservative	Robin David Cook *	1,154	37.7	N/A
Labour	Chris Brown	574	18.7	N/A
UKIP	Nick Wellstead	147	4.8	N/A
Majority		36	1.2	N/A
Turnout			42.38	N/A
Liberal Democrats win (new seat)				

=== Commons ===
Commons
Party	Candidate	Votes	%	±%
Conservative	Margaret Phipps *	1,789	68.2	+28.6
Liberal Democrats	Fiona Cox	467	17.8	+12.3
Labour	Peter Stokes	369	14.1	+7.5
Majority		1,322	50.4	+39.9
Turnout			32.03	+1.02
Conservative hold		Swing		

=== Corfe Mullen ===
Corfe Mullen
Party	Candidate	Votes	%	±%
Liberal Democrats	Susan Jefferies *	1,603	51.1	+2.8
Conservative	Paul Ronald Harrison	1,300	41.5	+19.3
Labour	David Peden	127	4.0	–0.3
UKIP	David Ewart Mattocks	106	3.4	–21.8
Majority		303	9.7	–13.4
Turnout			39.32	+7.65
Liberal Democrats hold		Swing		

=== Cranborne Chase ===
Cranborne Chase
Party	Candidate	Votes	%	±%
Conservative	Steve Butler *	1,773	75.0	+24.7
Labour	Joanne Margaret Scotton	442	18.7	+10.7
UKIP	Cyril John Barnes	148	6.3	–25.2
Majority		1,331	56.3	+37.5
Turnout			35.58	+2.35
Conservative hold		Swing		

=== Dorchester ===
Dorchester (2 seats)
Party	Candidate	Votes	%	±%
Liberal Democrats	Andy Canning *	2,871	44.0	+4.4
Liberal Democrats	Richard Martin Biggs *	2,799	–	
Conservative	Gerald Duke	1,781	27.3	+7.7
Conservative	Ian Francois Bernard Gosling	1,730	–	
Labour	Claudia Catherine Sorin	983	15.1	+2.0
Labour	Barry Thompson	775	–	
Green	Vicki Black	581	8.9	–1.1
UKIP	Geoffrey Robin Markham	311	4.8	–12.9
Green	Ken Huggins	265	–	
Turnout			39.24	+5.42
Liberal Democrats hold		Swing		
Liberal Democrats hold		Swing		

=== Ferndown ===
Ferndown (2 seats)
Party	Candidate	Votes	%	±%
Conservative	Steven Michael Lugg	3,090	66.6	+22.6
Conservative	Andrew Charles Parry	2,950	–	
UKIP	Lawrence Leslie Ralph Wilson	795	17.1	–27.6
UKIP	Peter Jonathan Lucas	657	–	
Liberal Democrats	Michael Francis Cox	508	11.0	N/A
Liberal Democrats	Jason Jones	429	–	
Labour	David Munnik	244	5.3	–6.1
Labour	Ian R Wands	203	–	
Turnout			32.52	+0.87
Conservative hold		Swing		
Conservative gain from UKIP		Swing		

=== Gillingham ===
Gillingham (2 seats)
Party	Candidate	Votes	%	±%
Conservative	David Walsh *	2,675	56.3	+19.8
Conservative	Andrew Ronald Cattaway *	2,368	–	
Liberal Democrats	Barry Von Clemens	1,252	26.4	N/A
Liberal Democrats	Graeme Henry Hole	802	–	
Labour	Geoff Longcroft	414	8.7	–1.8
UKIP	Peter Caulfield	409	8.6	–11.1
UKIP	Steve Unwin	348	–	
Labour	Clive Edward Struver	344	–	
Turnout			37.50	+4.33
Conservative hold		Swing		
Conservative win (new seat)				

=== Hambledon ===
Hambledon
Party	Candidate	Votes	%
Conservative	Deborah Croney	1,841	
Liberal Democrats	Martin Thomas Strange	488	
Labour	Keith Yarwood	221	
UKIP	Robert Michael Snow	178	
Turnout			35.48
Conservative hold			

=== Linden Lea ===
Linden Lea
Party	Candidate	Votes	%
Liberal Democrats	Nick Ireland	1,317	
Conservative	Peter Jonathon Stein	1,299	
Labour	Richard Michael Shrubb	198	
Green	Rebekah Webb	127	
Turnout			41.60
Liberal Democrats hold			

=== Lodmoor ===
Lodmoor
Party	Candidate	Votes	%
Conservative	Anthony Ferrari	1,702	
Liberal Democrats	David George Mannings	1,083	
Labour	Thomas Taylor	392	
Green	Brian Heatley	183	
Turnout			46.20
Conservative gain from Liberal Democrats			

=== Lytchett Minster and Upton ===
Lytchett Minster and Upton
Party	Candidate	Votes	%
Conservative	Bill Pipe	1,049	
Liberal Democrats	Fred Drane	944	
UKIP	Mike Fry	237	
Labour	Richard Douglas Jordan	154	
Turnout			35.70
Conservative win (new seat)			

=== Marshwood Vale ===
Marshwood Vale
Party	Candidate	Votes	%
Conservative	Daryl Turner	1,730	
Liberal Democrats	Steve Trevethan	538	
Labour	Joy Everington	284	
Green	Chit Chong	263	
Turnout			40.83
Conservative hold			

=== Moors ===
Moors (2 seats)
Party	Candidate	Votes	%
Conservative	Bray Ryan	3,743	
Conservative	David William Shortell	3,662	
UKIP	Robin Grey	776	
Liberal Democrats	Lily Cox	657	
Labour	Sandra Joy Turner	460	
Labour	Heather Jean Snow	367	
Turnout			
Conservative win (new seat)			
Conservative win (new seat)			

=== Mudeford and Highcliffe ===
Mudeford and Highcliffe
Party	Candidate	Votes	%
Conservative	Lesley Margaret Dedman	2,582	
Labour	Carol Ann Wilcox	557	
Turnout			40.04
Conservative hold			

=== North West Purbeck ===
North West Purbeck
Party	Candidate	Votes	%
Conservative	Peter Kendrick Wharf	1,654	
Liberal Democrats	John Brian Taylor	890	
Labour	Stewart Bullen	141	
UKIP	Josephine Marie Evans	123	
Turnout			40.40
Conservative win (new seat)			

=== Portland Harbour ===
Portland Harbour
Party	Candidate	Votes	%
Labour Co-op	Kate Wheller	1,282	
Conservative	Kerry Leanne Baker	879	
Green	Len Herbert	145	
Turnout			33.50
Labour Co-op hold			

=== Portland Tophill ===
Portland Tophill
Party	Candidate	Votes	%
Conservative	Katherine Muriel Garcia	995	
Labour Co-op	Paul Ralph Kimber	923	
Green	Claudia Lucienne Moore	149	
Turnout			32.20
Conservative gain from Labour Co-op			

=== Rodwell ===
Rodwell
Party	Candidate	Votes	%
Green	Clare Sutton	1,474	
Conservative	David Leslie Hastings	901	
Labour	Matthew John Hall	514	
UKIP	Jill Ann Hordle	195	
Turnout			41.00
Green hold			

=== Shaftesbury ===
Shaftesbury
Party	Candidate	Votes	%
Liberal Democrats	Derek Leslie Beer	1,231	
Conservative	Piers Brown	863	
UKIP	Lester Geoffrey Taylor	181	
Labour	Ursula Louise Ann Osborne	114	
Independent	Lester Mark Dibben	100	
Turnout			38.65
Liberal Democrats hold			

=== Sherborne Rural ===
Sherborne Rural
Party	Candidate	Votes	%
Conservative	Mary Penfold	1,657	
Liberal Democrats	Matt Hall	1,535	
Green	Andrew Martin Spring	130	
Turnout			47.25
Conservative gain from Liberal Democrats			

=== Sherborne Town ===
Sherborne Town
Party	Candidate	Votes	%
Liberal Democrats	Jon Andrews	1,493	
Conservative	Robert Andrew Gould	1,471	
Labour	Nick Boothroyd	126	
Green	Pam Rosling	103	
Turnout			45.57
Liberal Democrats gain from Conservative			

=== South Purbeck ===
South Purbeck
Party	Candidate	Votes	%
Conservative	Cherry Louise Brooks	1,135	
Independent	Nigel Dragon	766	
Liberal Democrats	Graham Holmes	666	
Labour	Leigh Van De Zande	205	
Turnout			40.90
Conservative win (new seat)			

=== Stalbridge and The Beacon ===
Stalbridge and The Beacon
Party	Candidate	Votes	%
Conservative	Graham Carr-Jones	1,879	
Liberal Democrats	Dorothy Jane Webb	424	
UKIP	Rory Herbert	235	
Labour	Richard George Harvey	203	
Turnout			39.68
Conservative win (new seat)			

=== Swanage ===
Swanage
Party	Candidate	Votes	%
Conservative	William Stanley Trite	1,856	
Labour	Cherry Ann Bartlett	679	
Liberal Democrats	Gill Calvin–Thomas	540	
Independent	Jason Paul Haiselden	140	
Turnout			40.60
Conservative hold			

=== Three Valleys ===
Three Valleys
Party	Candidate	Votes	%
Conservative	Jill Haynes	1,853	
Liberal Democrats	David Taylor	720	
Green	Peter John Barton	349	
Labour	Janine Miller	301	
Turnout			39.28
Conservative hold			

=== Verwood ===
Verwood (2 seats)
Party	Candidate	Votes	%
Conservative	Toni Bartley Coombs	3,160	
Conservative	Spencer Grant Flower	2,878	
Liberal Democrats	David Lawrence Tooke	820	
Green	Kate Bisson	545	
UKIP	John Baxter	527	
Labour	Christopher John Archibold	387	
Labour	Peter Thomas Parsons	276	
Turnout			33.15
Conservative hold			
Conservative hold			

=== Walkford ===
Walkford
Party	Candidate	Votes	%
Conservative	Colin Jamieson	2,186	
Labour	Lindsay Turner	516	
Turnout			34.81
Conservative win (new seat)			

=== Wareham ===
Wareham
Party	Candidate	Votes	%
Liberal Democrats	Beryl Rita Ezzard	1,778	
Conservative	Laura Jane Miller	1,234	
Labour	Roy Holliday	185	
UKIP	Keith Allen Simpson	165	
Turnout			44.80
Liberal Democrats hold			

=== Westham ===
Westham
Party	Candidate	Votes	%
Liberal Democrats	David Best Harris	1,155	
Conservative	Shenis Cant	791	
Labour	Kieron Womble	488	
Green	James Robert Askew	158	
Turnout			35.80
Liberal Democrats hold			

=== Weymouth Town ===
Weymouth Town
Party	Candidate	Votes	%
Green	Jon Orrell	810	
Conservative	Jason Louis Osborne	698	
Labour	Ann Linda Rosina Weaving	464	
Liberal Democrats	Christine Mary James	387	
UKIP	Francis George Drake	206	
Turnout			35.40
Green gain from Labour			

=== Winterborne ===
Winterbourne
Party	Candidate	Votes	%
Conservative	Hilary Ann Cox	1,527	
Liberal Democrats	David Charles Thomas Fox	506	
Labour	Haydn Roger White	284	
Turnout			36.01
Conservative hold			

== By-elections between 2017 and 2019 ==
=== Bridport ===
A by-election was held for the Bridport ward of Dorset County Council on 22 February 2018 following the resignation of Liberal Democrat councillor Ros Kayes.

Bridport by-election 22 February 2018
Party	Candidate	Votes	%	±%
Conservative	Mark Roberts	1,660	39.6	+2.4
Liberal Democrats	Dave Rickard	1,451	34.6	−3.7
Labour	Rose Allwork	691	16.5	+4.5
Green	Kelvin Clayton	388	9.3	−3.2
Majority		209	5.0	
Turnout		4,190		
Conservative gain from Liberal Democrats		Swing		

=== Ferndown ===
A by-election was held for the Ferndown ward of Dorset County Council on 25 October 2018 following the death of Conservative councillor Steve Lugg.

Ferndown by-election 25 October 2018
Party	Candidate	Votes	%	±%
Conservative	Mike Parkes	1,878	61.3	−5.3
Liberal Democrats	Matthew Coussell	647	21.1	+10.1
UKIP	Lawrence Wilson	540	17.6	+0.5
Majority		1,231	40.2	
Turnout		3,065		
Conservative hold		Swing		
