= Reading Crown Court =

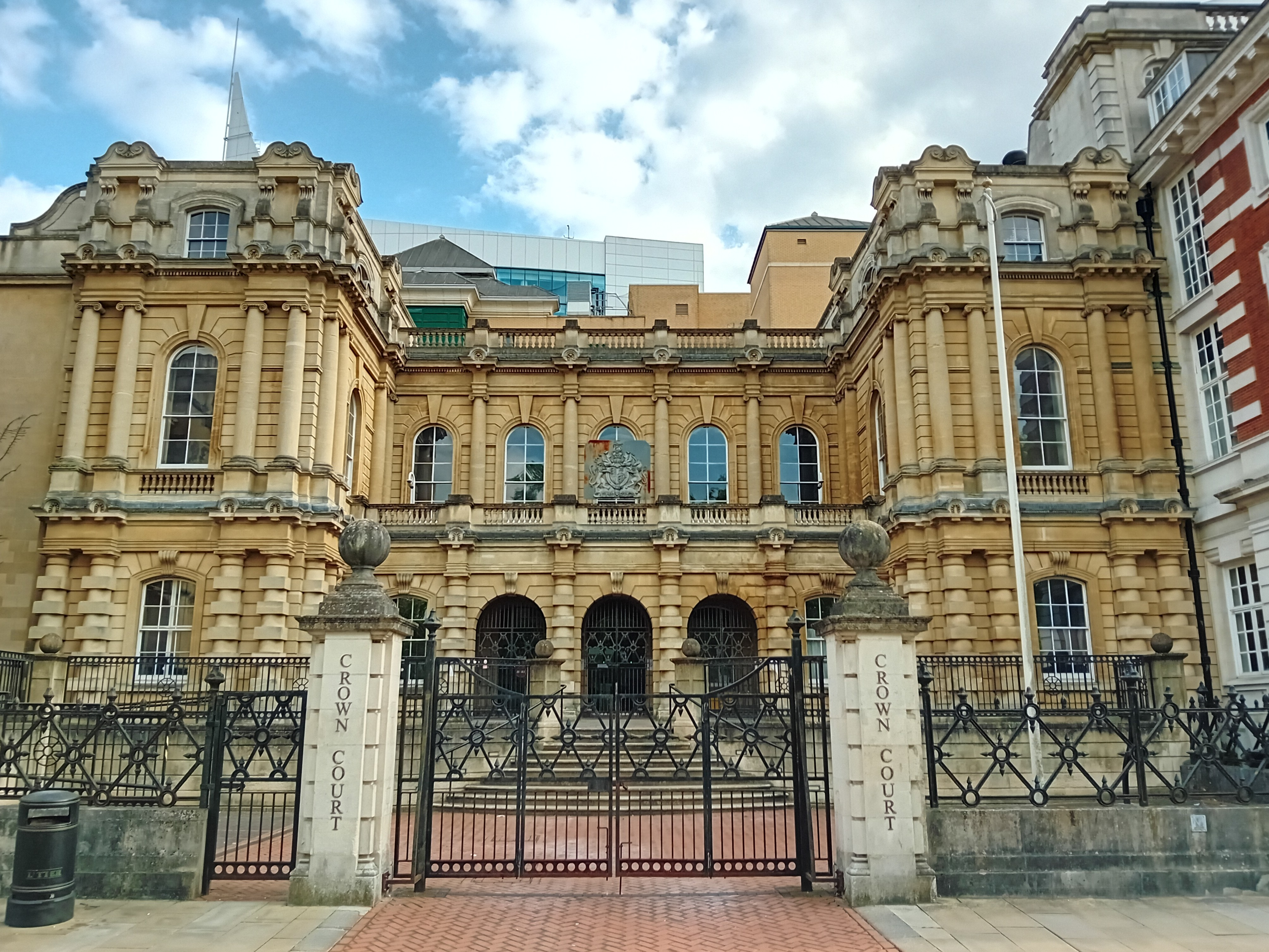

- Location within Berkshire
- 51.4562°N 0.967°W
- Location: Reading, Berkshire

History
- Built: 1861

Site notes
- Architect: John Clacy
- Architectural style: Baroque revival style

Listed Building – Grade II
- Designated: 14 December 1978
- Reference no.: 1113476

Reading Crown Court is a judicial facility in Reading, Berkshire. It is a Grade II listed building.

== History ==
The building, which was designed by the county surveyor, John Clacy, in the Baroque revival style and built at a cost of £21,644, was completed in 1861. It became the main venue for the assizes from 1867 when Abingdon County Hall ceded that role to Reading. The design involved a symmetrical main frontage with seven bays facing onto The Forbury with the end bays projected forward; the central section of five bays featured a three-bay portico with Doric order columns; there were round headed sash windows flanked by Ionic order columns on the first floor. The complex included the county police station which was built behind the courthouse.

Following the implementation of the Local Government Act 1888, which established county councils in every county, it also became the meeting place for Berkshire County Council. The administrative staff and committee rooms of the county council were accommodated in the Shire Hall next door. Following the implementation of the Courts Act 1971, the former assizes court was re-designated Reading Crown Court. In 1981 the county council moved to a new Shire Hall at Shinfield Park and subsequently it was used solely by the Crown Court.

Important cases heard by Reading Crown Court included the trial and conviction of Leslie Bailey for the murder of Mark Tildesley in December 1992 and the trial and conviction of Llewellyn Adams, Indrit Krasniqi, Michael Johnson, Jamaile Morally, Joshua Morally and Adrian Thomas for the murder of Mary-Ann Leneghan in March 2012. It was also the venue for the Munir Hussain case, in which a businessman, Munir Hussain, was tried and convicted of assaulting a burglar, Walid Salem, in December 2009.

The initial stages of the trial of Jed Foster for the killing of Andrew Harper were also heard at Reading Crown Court in August 2019, but on 19 September the Crown Prosecution Service said that they had discontinued the case against him.
