= 1993 Dorset County Council election =

Local election in Dorset

- 6 May 1993

All 77 seats to Dorset County Council 38 seats needed for a majority
- Turnout: 32.24%
| | First party | Second party |
|---|---|---|
| Party | Liberal Democrats | Conservative |
| Seats won | 38 | 29 |
| Seat change | ▲16 | ▼15 |
| Popular vote | 79,448 | 70,676 |
| Percentage | 41.5% | 36.9% |
| | Third party | Fourth party |
| Party | Labour | Independent |
| Seats won | 6 | 4 |
| Seat change | Steady | ▼5 |
| Popular vote | 28,347 | 11,267 |
| Percentage | 14.8% | 5.9% |
Council control before election
Conservative
Council control after election
Liberal Democrats

The 1993 Dorset County Council election was held on 6 May 1993, alongside other local elections across the United Kingdom. All 77 seats of Dorset County Council were up for election.

A legal challenge to the result was lodged for the Lytchett division of North Dorset. Conservative candidate Commander Harry Selby-Bennett won 1,315 votes while Liberal Democrat candidate, Peter Gainsford had 1,314 votes. The result was declared void by the High Court. In September 1993, the council was taken by the Liberal Democrats following local council by-election wins.

== Results summary ==
Results
| Party | Seats | Change | Votes | Votes % |
|---|---|---|---|---|
| Liberal Democrats | 38 | ▲17 | 79,448 | 41.5 |
| Conservative Party | 29 | ▼12 | 70,676 | 36.9 |
| Labour Party | 6 | Steady | 28,347 | 14.8 |
| Independents | 4 | ▼5 | 11,267 | 5.9 |
| Green | 0 | Steady | 1,760 | 0.9 |
| Votes | | | 190,692 | |
| Votes | | | 514,270 | |

== Ward results ==
=== Alderney ===
Alderney
| Party | Candidate | Votes | % | ±% |
|---|---|---|---|---|
| Liberal Democrats | E. Hogg | 1,150 | 58.9 | |
| Labour | H. White | 803 | 41.1 | |
| Majority | | 347 | 17.8 | |
| Turnout | | 1,953 | 30.5 | |
| Registered electors | | 6,401 | | |
| Liberal Democrats win (new seat) | | | | |

=== Beaminster ===
Beaminster
| Party | Candidate | Votes | % | ±% |
|---|---|---|---|---|
| Liberal Democrats | F. Streets | 1,785 | 50.9 | |
| Conservative | J. Peake* | 1,725 | 49.1 | |
| Majority | | 60 | 1.7 | |
| Turnout | | 3,510 | 51.7 | |
| Registered electors | | 6,795 | | |
| Liberal Democrats gain from Conservative | | Swing | 10% | |

=== Blackmore Vale ===
Blackmore Vale
| Party | Candidate | Votes | % | ±% |
|---|---|---|---|---|
| Liberal Democrats | G. Rose | 1,898 | 62.1 | |
| Conservative | D. Adami | 1,063 | 34.8 | |
| Labour | Ms N. Hayes | 97 | 3.2 | |
| Majority | | 835 | 27.3 | |
| Turnout | | 2,961 | 46.8 | |
| Registered electors | | 6,528 | | |
| Liberal Democrats gain from Conservative | | Swing | 15% | |

=== Blandford ===
Blandford
| Party | Candidate | Votes | % | ±% |
|---|---|---|---|---|
| Liberal Democrats | B. Cooper | 1,801 | 62.5 | |
| Conservative | Ms. J. Rousseau | 811 | 28.1 | |
| Labour | M. Owen | 269 | 9.3 | |
| Majority | | 990 | 34.4 | |
| Turnout | | 2,612 | 41.3 | |
| Registered electors | | 6,978 | | |
| Liberal Democrats gain from Conservative | | Swing | 20% | |

=== Boscombe East ===
Boscombe East
| Party | Candidate | Votes | % | ±% |
|---|---|---|---|---|
| Liberal Democrats | W. Brandwood | 942 | 53.0 | |
| Conservative | W. Carey* | 635 | 35.7 | |
| Labour | A. Crew | 200 | 11.3 | |
| Majority | | 307 | 17.3 | |
| Turnout | | 1,577 | 30.0 | |
| Registered electors | | 5,917 | | |
| Liberal Democrats gain from Conservative | | Swing | 15% | |

=== Boscombe West ===
Boscombe West
| Party | Candidate | Votes | % | ±% |
|---|---|---|---|---|
| Conservative | R. Wotton* | 680 | 45.2 | |
| Liberal Democrats | A. Eggerding | 605 | 40.2 | |
| Labour | M. Davis | 220 | 14.6 | |
| Majority | | 75 | 5.0 | |
| Turnout | | 1,285 | 22.9 | |
| Registered electors | | 6,587 | | |
| Conservative hold | | | | |

=== Bournemouth Central ===
Bournemouth Central
| Party | Candidate | Votes | % | ±% |
|---|---|---|---|---|
| Conservative | W. Robbins | 827 | 47.7 | |
| Independent | Ms. L. Rhodes* | 605 | 34.9 | |
| Labour | Ms. S. Reynolds | 300 | 17.3 | |
| Majority | | 222 | 12.8 | |
| Turnout | | 1,732 | 29.4 | |
| Registered electors | | 5,892 | | |
| Conservative gain from Independent | | Swing | 10% | |

== See also ==
- Dorset County Council elections
