= 1993 United Kingdom local elections =

- 6 May 1993 (England & Wales); 19 May 1993 (Northern Ireland)

All 39 non-metropolitan counties, 1 sui generis authority, all 26 Northern Irish districts and all 8 Welsh counties
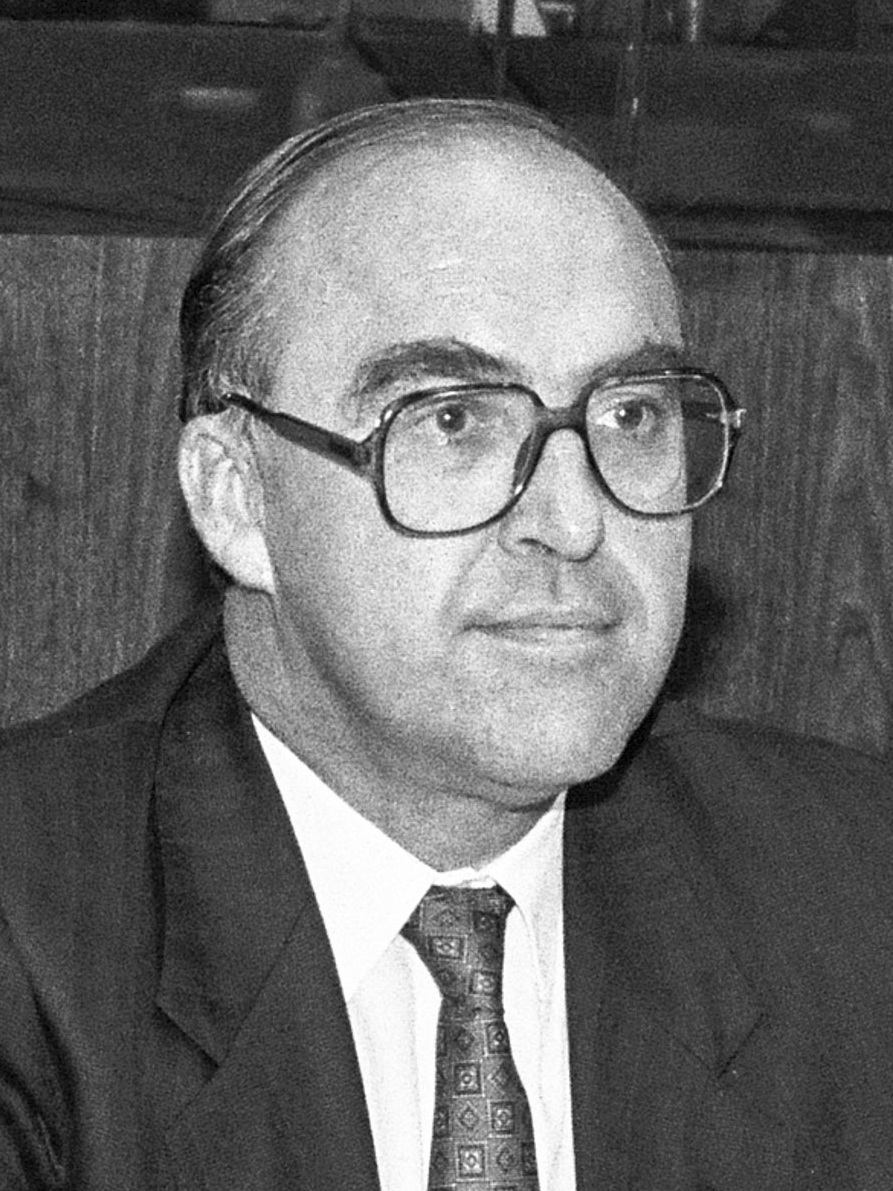

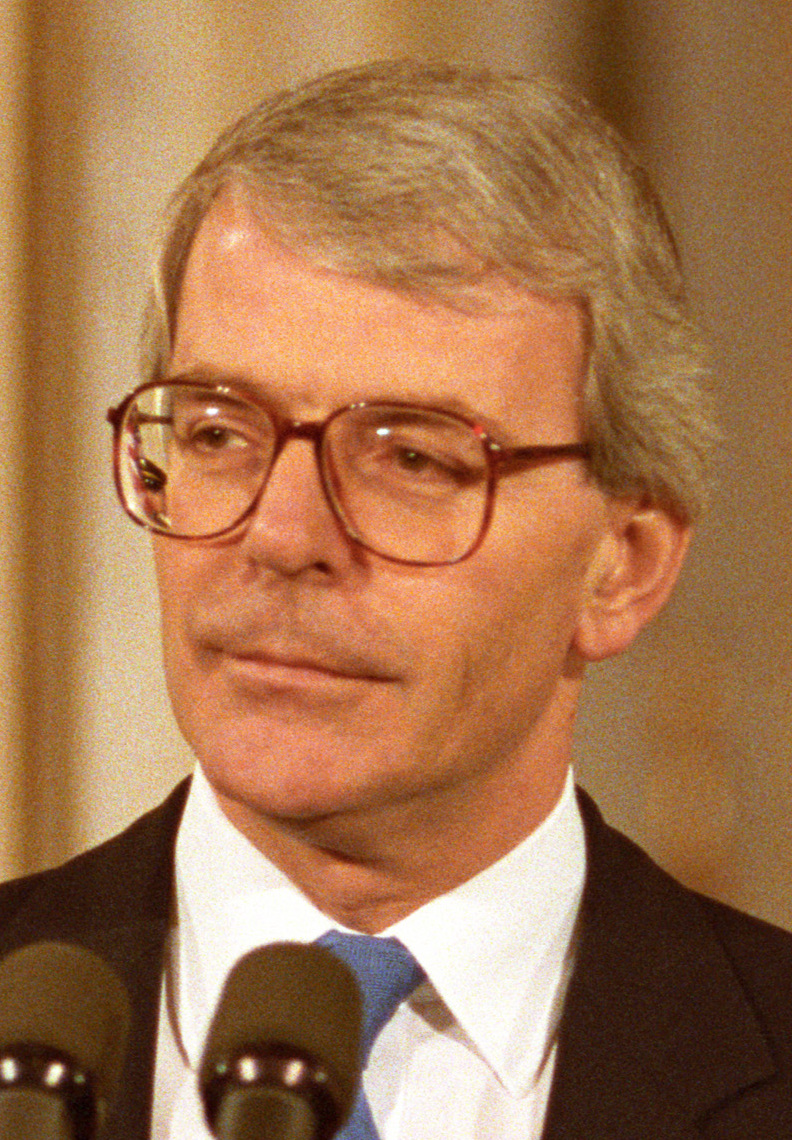

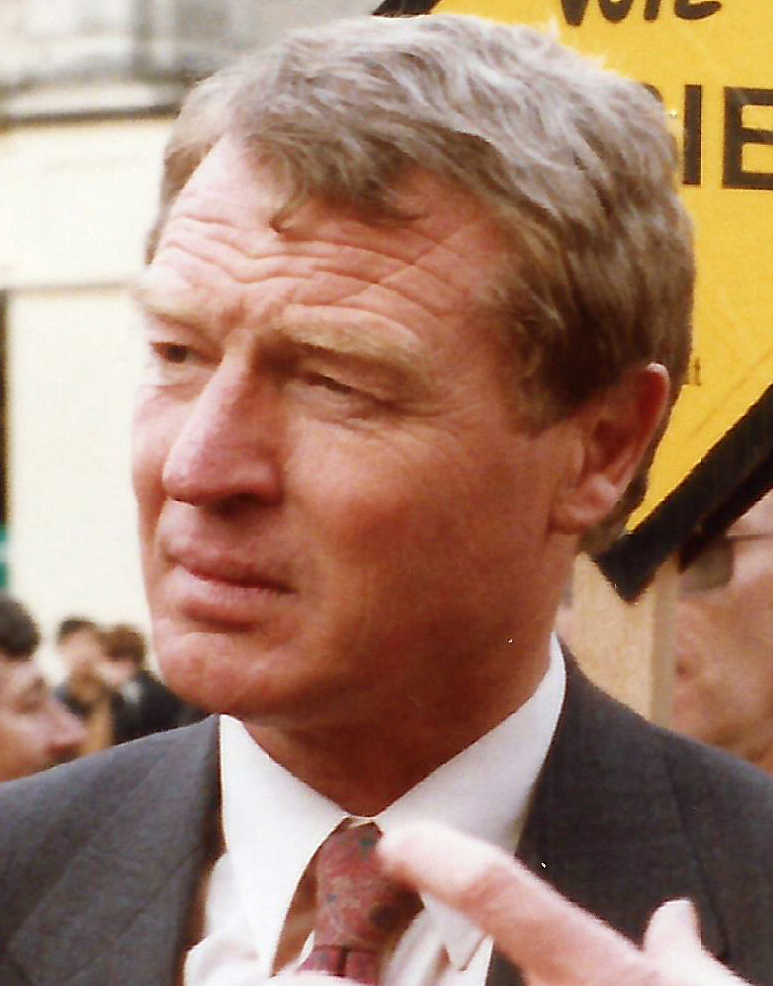
| | Majority party | Minority party | Third party |
|---|---|---|---|
| Leader | John Smith | John Major | Paddy Ashdown |
| Party | Labour | Conservative | Liberal Democrats |
| Leader since | 18 July 1992 | 27 November 1990 | 16 July 1988 |
| Percentage | 39% | 31% | 25% |
| Councillors | 9,213 | 7,802 | 4,123 |
| Councillors +/- | ▲111 | ▼486 | ▲395 |
- Colours denote the winning party, as shown in the main table of results.

The 1993 United Kingdom local elections were held on Thursday 6 May 1993 in England and Wales, and Wednesday 19 May 1993 in Northern Ireland. The results showed a decline for the governing Conservative Party, who were still reeling from the fallout of Black Wednesday; with the third-placed party, the Liberal Democrats, gaining most seats.

The main opposition Labour Party, now led by John Smith following Neil Kinnock's resignation as party leader, gained 111 seats, bringing their number of councillors to 9,213. Their share of the vote was projected to be 39%, their highest since 1990.

The governing Conservative Party lost 486 seats and was left with 7,802 councillors. Their projected share of the vote was 31%, a 15% decline since the previous local elections in 1992.

The Liberal Democrats gained 395 seats and had 4,123 councillors following the elections. Their projected share of the vote was 25%, an increase in 5% from the 1992 local elections.

On the same day as local elections in England and Wales, a parliamentary by-election was held in the Newbury constituency in Berkshire. The Conservatives lost this seat to the Liberal Democrats.

== England ==
=== Non-metropolitan county councils ===
These were the last elections to the county councils of Avon, Berkshire, Cleveland, Hereford and Worcester, Humberside and Isle of Wight before they were abolished by the Local Government Commission for England (1992).

| Council | Previous control | Result | Details |
|---|---|---|---|
| Avon | No overall control | No overall control hold | Details |
| Bedfordshire | No overall control | No overall control hold | Details |
| Berkshire | Conservative | No overall control gain | Details |
| Buckinghamshire | Conservative | Conservative hold | Details |
| Cambridgeshire | Conservative | No overall control gain | Details |
| Cheshire | No overall control | No overall control hold | Details |
| Cleveland | Labour | Labour hold | Details |
| Cornwall | No overall control | Liberal Democrats gain | Details |
| Cumbria | No overall control | No overall control hold | Details |
| Derbyshire | Labour | Labour hold | Details |
| Devon | Conservative | No overall control gain | Details |
| Dorset | Conservative | No overall control gain | Details |
| Durham | Labour | Labour hold | Details |
| East Sussex | Conservative | No overall control gain | Details |
| Essex | Conservative | No overall control gain | Details |
| Gloucestershire | No overall control | No overall control hold | Details |
| Hampshire | Conservative | No overall control gain | Details |
| Hereford and Worcester | No overall control | No overall control hold | Details |
| Hertfordshire | Conservative | No overall control gain | Details |
| Humberside | Labour | Labour hold | Details |
| Isle of Wight | Liberal Democrats | Liberal Democrats hold | Details |
| Kent | Conservative | No overall control gain | Details |
| Lancashire | Labour | Labour hold | Details |
| Leicestershire | No overall control | No overall control hold | Details |
| Lincolnshire | Conservative | No overall control gain | Details |
| Norfolk | Conservative | No overall control gain | Details |
| North Yorkshire | No overall control | No overall control hold | Details |
| Northamptonshire | No overall control | Labour gain | Details |
| Northumberland | Labour | Labour hold | Details |
| Nottinghamshire | Labour | Labour hold | Details |
| Oxfordshire | No overall control | No overall control hold | Details |
| Shropshire | No overall control | No overall control hold | Details |
| Somerset | Conservative | Liberal Democrats gain | Details |
| Staffordshire | Labour | Labour hold | Details |
| Suffolk | Conservative | No overall control gain | Details |
| Surrey | Conservative | No overall control gain | Details |
| Warwickshire | Conservative | No overall control gain | Details |
| West Sussex | Conservative | No overall control gain | Details |
| Wiltshire ‡ | No overall control | No overall control hold | Details |

‡ New electoral division boundaries

=== Sui generis ===
| Council | Previous control | Result | Details |
|---|---|---|---|
| Isles of Scilly | | | Details |

== Northern Ireland ==
| Council | Previous control | Result | Details |
|---|---|---|---|
| Antrim | UUP | No overall control | Details |
| Ards | No overall control | No overall control | Details |
| Armagh | UUP | No overall control | Details |
| Ballymena | DUP | No overall control | Details |
| Ballymoney | No overall control | No overall control | Details |
| Banbridge | UUP | UUP | Details |
| Belfast | No overall control | No overall control | Details |
| Carrickfergus | No overall control | No overall control | Details |
| Castlereagh | No overall control | No overall control | Details |
| Coleraine | No overall control | UUP | Details |
| Cookstown | No overall control | No overall control | Details |
| Craigavon | No overall control | No overall control | Details |
| Derry | No overall control | SDLP | Details |
| Down | SDLP | SDLP | Details |
| Dungannon | No overall control | No overall control | Details |
| Fermanagh | No overall control | No overall control | Details |
| Larne | No overall control | No overall control | Details |
| Limavady | No overall control | No overall control | Details |
| Lisburn | UUP | UUP | Details |
| Magherafelt | No overall control | No overall control | Details |
| Moyle | No overall control | No overall control | Details |
| Newry and Mourne | SDLP | SDLP | Details |
| Newtownabbey | No overall control | No overall control | Details |
| North Down | No overall control | No overall control | Details |
| Omagh | No overall control | No overall control | Details |
| Strabane | No overall control | No overall control | Details |

== Wales ==
=== County councils ===
These were the last elections to the county councils before they were abolished by the Local Government (Wales) Act 1994.

| Council | Previous control | Result | Details |
|---|---|---|---|
| Clwyd | Labour | Labour hold | Details |
| Dyfed | No overall control | No overall control hold | Details |
| Gwent | Labour | Labour hold | Details |
| Gwynedd | Independent | No overall control gain | Details |
| Mid Glamorgan | Labour | Labour hold | Details |
| Powys | Independent | Independent hold | Details |
| South Glamorgan | Labour | Labour hold | Details |
| West Glamorgan | Labour | Labour hold | Details |
