= 1997 Dorset County Council election =

Local election in Dorset

The 1997 Dorset County Council election was held on 1 May 1997, on the same day as the 1997 general election and other local elections. This was the first election in which as a result of Local Government Reorganisation there was creation of two new Unitary Authorities in the county; Bournemouth and Poole. The council remained under no overall control.

== Results summary ==
Results
Party	Seats	Change
Liberal Democrat	31	▼7
Conservative	21	▼8
Labour	5	▼1
Other	1	▼3

== See also ==
- Dorset County Council elections
