= Berkshire County Council =

Former local authority in Berkshire, England

- Coat of arms

Type
- Type: County council

History
- Established: 1 April 1889
- Disbanded: 31 March 1998
- Preceded by: Court of Quarter Sessions
- Succeeded by: Bracknell Forest Council; Reading Borough Council; Slough Borough Council; West Berkshire Council; Windsor and Maidenhead Borough Council; Wokingham Borough Council

Elections
- Last election: 6 May 1993

Meeting place
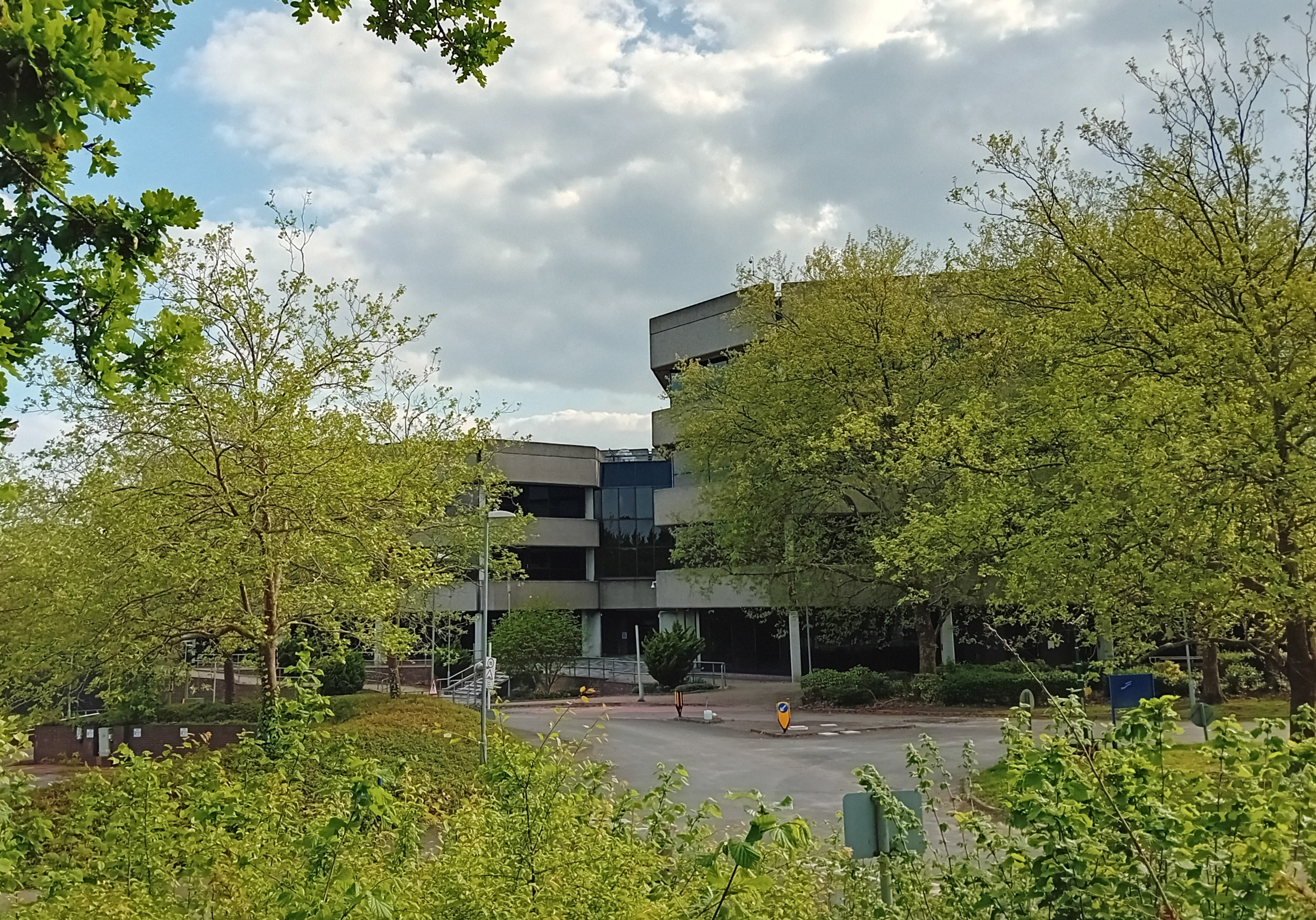
- Shire Hall, Shinfield Park, Reading

Berkshire County Council, also known as the County Council of the Royal County of Berkshire, was the county council for Berkshire in England. It was created in 1889 and abolished in 1998. The council had responsibilities for education, social services, public transport, planning, emergency services and waste disposal.

On the abolition of the county council in 1998, the county's six existing district councils also took on county council functions in their areas, making them unitary authorities. Berkshire is therefore now administered by the six councils of Bracknell Forest, Reading, Slough, West Berkshire, Windsor and Maidenhead, and Wokingham.

== History ==
Elected county councils were created in 1889 under the Local Government Act 1888, taking over many administrative functions that had previously been performed by unelected magistrates at the quarter sessions. The areas covered by the new county councils were called administrative counties. These differed from the historic counties by excluding any boroughs considered large enough to provide their own county-level functions, known as county boroughs, and by adjusting the boundaries such that any urban sanitary districts which straddled county boundaries were placed entirely in one administrative county. In Berkshire's case, Reading was made a county borough, and the urban sanitary districts of Abingdon and Oxford had straddled the county boundary prior to 1889; Abingdon was placed entirely in Berkshire and Oxford was placed entirely in Oxfordshire.

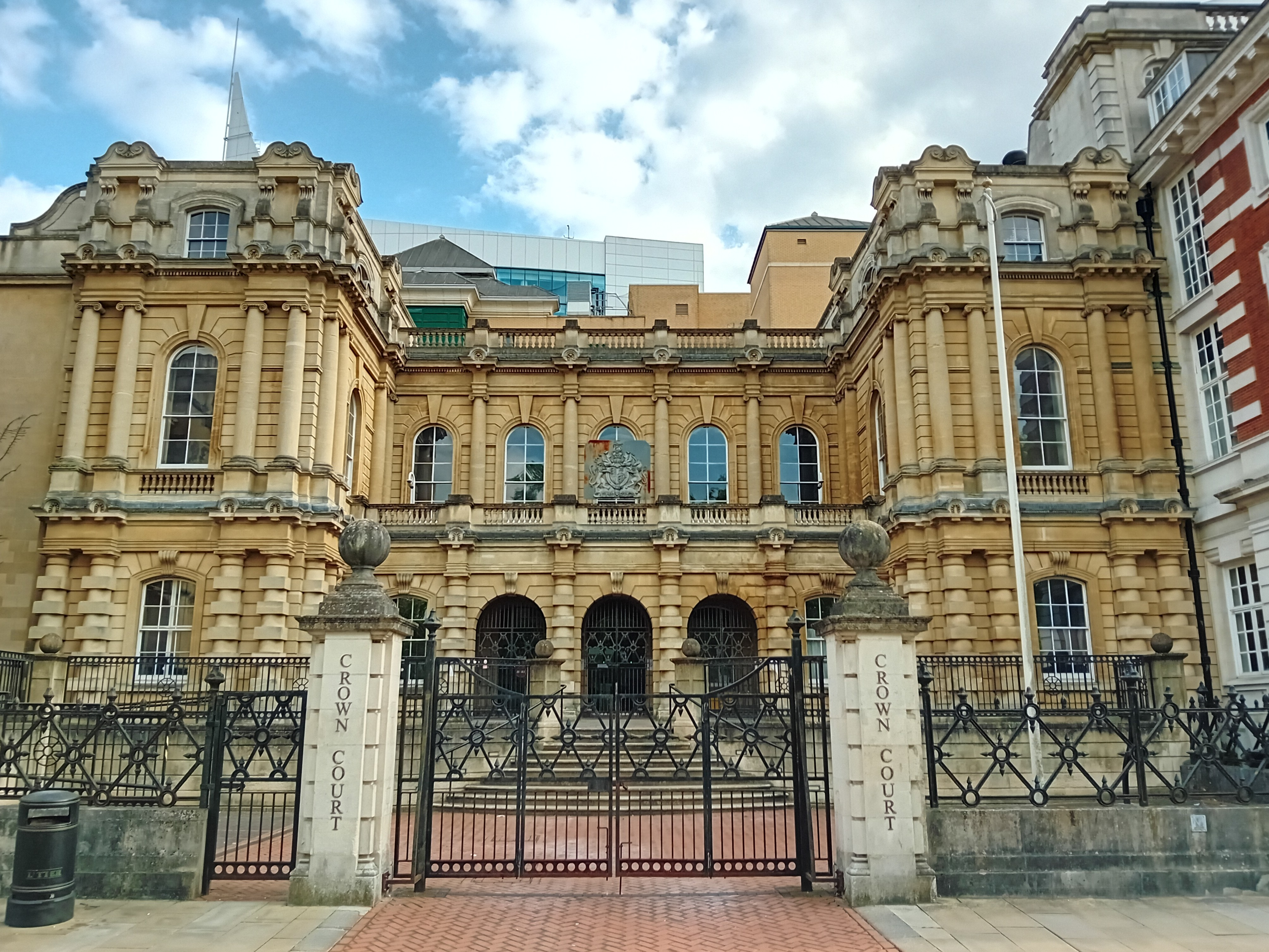
Reading Assizes Court: Council's meeting place 1889–1981

The first elections were held in January 1889. After some provisional meetings, the council formally came into being on 1 April 1889. On that day it held its first official meeting at Reading Assizes Court, the county's main courthouse, which had been completed in 1861 and also served as the meeting place for the quarter sessions which preceded the county council. The first chairman of the council was William George Mount, who was also the Conservative Member of Parliament for Newbury and the chairman of the quarter sessions.

In 1957 the council was given official permission from Elizabeth II to describe the county as the "Royal County of Berkshire". After that it styled itself the "County Council of the Royal County of Berkshire" in official notices, although the name "Berkshire County Council" continued to be commonly used in the media.

=== Non-metropolitan county ===
Local government was reformed in 1974 under the Local Government Act 1972. The administrative county of Berkshire was abolished and a new non-metropolitan county of Berkshire created instead. There were some significant differences in the new county's territory; it ceded a large area north of the Berkshire Downs hills in the north-west of the old county to Oxfordshire, but gained the area around Slough and Eton from Buckinghamshire. Reading was also brought under the authority of the county council for the first time. The lower tier of local government was reformed at the same time. Prior to 1974 it had comprised numerous boroughs, urban districts and rural districts. After 1974 the lower tier within the county as reformed comprised six non-metropolitan districts: Bracknell (renamed Bracknell Forest in 1988), Newbury, Reading, Slough, Windsor and Maidenhead, and Wokingham.

=== Abolition ===
The Local Government Act 1992 allowed for local government to be reorganised into single-tier authorities which perform both the functions of a district council and a county council. Such authorities subsequently became known as unitary authorities; in effect they have the same powers that the pre-1974 county boroughs did. The subsequent Banham Review sought to identify areas where such consolidation of local authorities could be applied, trying to reduce the number of tiers of local government. The Banham Review recommended abolishing Berkshire County Council and having the county administered by five unitary authorities, based on the pre-existing districts but merging Bracknell Forest and Windsor and Maidenhead into a single district. The government decided instead to leave the districts unchanged and make all six of them unitary authorities.

The way the change was implemented was to declare that there should be no county council for the non-metropolitan county of Berkshire, but that the six existing district councils would take on county council functions in their areas, making them unitary authorities. The county council's last day was 31 March 1998; the district councils assumed their new responsibilities from 1 April 1998. Newbury District Council changed its name to West Berkshire Council to coincide with the change in its responsibilities.

=== Aftermath ===
One of the last chairmen of Berkshire County Council, Tony Wiseman, went on to found CRAG (a combination of the Readingstoke Action Group and CPRE) with a number of other former members of the council. CRAG successfully opposed Wokingham Borough Council's plan for building houses between Reading and Basingstoke (to create a conurbation dubbed 'Readingstoke').

== Premises ==
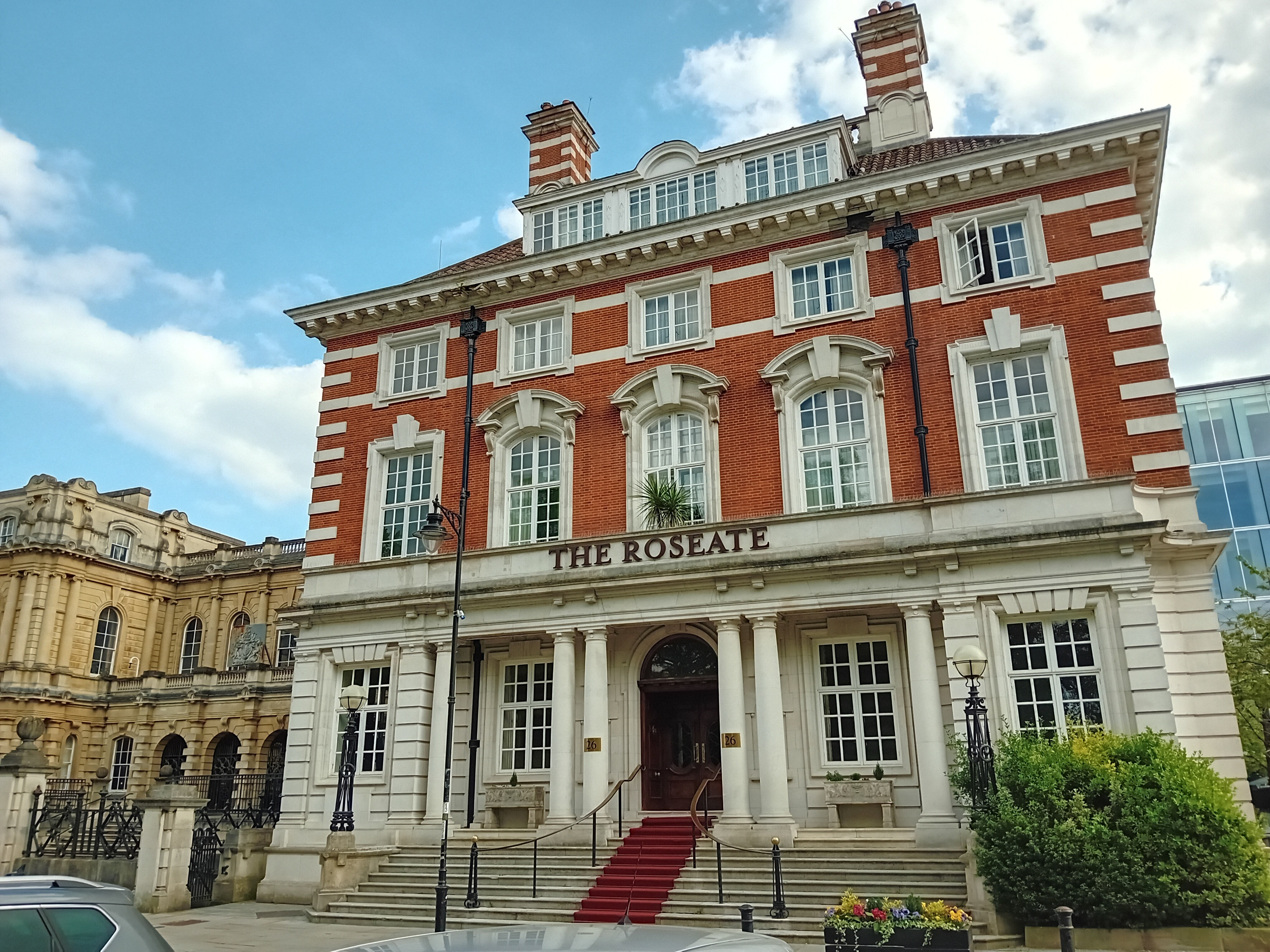
Shire Hall, The Forbury, Reading (now the Roseate Reading Hotel)

Berkshire County Council established its meeting place in the Assize Courts on The Forbury in Reading. As the council's responsibilities grew, there was a need for more office space. In 1911 the council built itself a dedicated office building called Shire Hall immediately west of the Assizes Courts. Council meetings continued to be held at the Assizes Courts.

In 1981, the council left Shire Hall and moved to bigger premises at a new Shire Hall at Shinfield Park, on the southern outskirts of Reading, but just outside the borough boundaries in the neighbouring parish of Shinfield. The new building cost an estimated £27.5 million.

== Political control ==
Elections were held to Berkshire County Council every three years (except during the two world wars) until 1974, changing to every four years after the 1974 reforms. The last full election took place in 1993.

Political control of the county council from the reforms of 1974 until its abolition in 1998 was as follows:

Party in control	Years
No overall control	1974–1977
Conservative	1977–1981
No overall control	1981–1985
Conservative	1985–1989
No overall control	1989–1998

Most councillors stood as independent candidates prior to 1974, and party affiliations were not given on ballot papers until 1970. At the 1946 election, a year after the Labour victory in the 1945 general election, Labour won 17 seats. Despite this win, Labour were still a minority and party politics did not meaningfully come into play on the county council until after the 1974 reforms.

The council was then led by the Conservatives until 1992, when a Liberal Democrat and Labour coalition took control. The same coalition continued following the 1993 elections, but the coalition fractured in 1996. A Liberal Democrat minority administration then ran the council with informal support from the Conservatives until the council's abolition in 1998.

== Leadership ==
At first, the chairman was also the council's political leader. After the 1974 reforms, the separate position of leader of the council was created and the chairman became a more ceremonial position.

=== Chairmen ===
Chairmanships were unlimited in duration or number of times (e.g. Sir George Robert Mowbray held the chairmanship twice, in 1944–1946 and 1960–1965).

In 1965, chairman Sir Louis Dickens changed the term of office to 3 years, to be changed one year before elections. In 1974, the Local Government Act changed the size of and nature of the council, hence the distinction between 'old' and 'new' County Councils.

==== Old Berkshire County Council (1889–1974) ====
The following table lists the chairmen of the old Berkshire County Council from 1889 to 1974:

Name	Chairman
William George Mount (Note: Chairman of the preceding Court of Quarter Sessions 1887–1902)	1889–1905
Albert Richard Tull	1905–1906
William Hew Dunn	1906–1911
Sir Robert Gray Cornish Mowbray	1911–1916
James Herbert Benyon	1916–1926
Sir William Arthur Mount	1926–1930
Thomas Skurray	1931–1938
Arthur Thomas Loyd	1938–1944
Sir George Robert Mowbray (Note: First term)	1944–1946
Henry Arthur Benyon	1946–1947
Herbert James Thomas	1947–1954
William John Cumber	1954–1957
Colonel Granville Watson	1957–1960
Sir George Robert Mowbray (Note: Second term)	1960–1965
Air Commodore Sir Louis Walter Dickens (Note: Instituted 3 year chairmanships)	1965–1968
Derrick Aylmer Frederick Henry Howard Hartley Russell	1968–1971
Richard Henry Carilef Seymour	1971–1974

Councillors were generally elected without a party affiliation, although two of the chairmen (William George Mount and Arthur Loyd) had been Conservative MPs prior to becoming chairman.

==== New Berkshire County Council (1974–1998) ====
The following table lists the chairmen of the new Berkshire County Council from 1974 to 1998:

Name	Chairman	Party
Derek Pickering	1974–1977	Conservative
Richard Watt	1977–1980	Conservative
Lewis Moss	1980–1982	Conservative
Trevor Timperley	1982–1983	Labour
Ian Morgan	1983–1986	Conservative
Gareth Gimblett	1986–1989	Conservative
Tony Wiseman	1989–1992	Conservative
Jim Day	1992–1994	Liberal Democrats
Cecil Trembath	1994–1996	Liberal Democrats
Maurice Tomkinson	1996–1997	Conservative
Ann Risman	1997–1998	Liberal Democrats

=== Leaders ===
The leaders of the council from 1974 until the council's abolition in 1998 were:

Councillor	Party	From	To	Notes
Richard Watt	Conservative	1 Apr 1974	May 1977	
Lewis Moss	Conservative	May 1977	1979	
Christopher Ward	Conservative	1979	May 1981	
Gareth Gimblett	Conservative	May 1981	May 1986	
Ron Jewitt	Conservative	May 1986	Oct 1989	
John Whitwell	Conservative	Oct 1989	Mar 1991	
Gareth Gimblett	Conservative	Mar 1991	May 1992	
Lawrence Silverman	Labour	May 1992	May 1993	
Linda Murray	Liberal Democrats	May 1993	May 1995	Joint leaders
Lawrence Silverman	Labour	May 1993	May 1995	Joint leaders
Bob Mowatt	Liberal Democrats	May 1995	May 1996	Joint leaders
Lawrence Silverman	Labour	May 1995	May 1996	Joint leaders
Bob Mowatt	Liberal Democrats	Jul 1996	31 Mar 1998	

For the final couple of months of the council's existence, Bob Mowatt's deputy, Jeff Brooks, served as acting leader.

== Coat of arms ==
Coat of arms of Berkshire County Council from 1961 to 1974

The College of Arms granted Berkshire County Council a coat of arms on 18 July 1947, comprising a blue shield with two golden lions, derived from arms used by Norman kings and associated with Reading Abbey, with an embattled border representing the county's castles, of which Windsor Castle is the most prominent. Above the shield was a crest of a stag and oak tree, based on the badge of the old Royal Berkshire Militia; there is a tradition that a banner with a stag and oak was carried by the men of Berkshire at the Battle of Agincourt. The stag and oak are assumed to represent the county's forests and the popularity of hunting in the area amongst Saxon and Norman kings. A subsequent grant of 7 April 1961 supplemented the arms with supporters, being a red lion and white horse, and the colour of the stag was changed from white to gold. The red lion carries a Tudor rose as a symbol of the county's royal connections. The white horse represents the Uffington White Horse, and carries a symbol known in heraldry as a "pile", being a punning reference to the atomic pile at the Atomic Energy Research Establishment at Harwell.

The official blazon (heraldic description) of the coat of arms after the 1961 changes was:

- Arms: Azure two Lions passant guardant in pale Or a Bordure embattled Ermine.
- Crest: On a Wreath of the Colours upon a Mount Vert a Stag at gaze Or in front of an Oak Tree fructed proper.
- Supporters: On the dexter side a Lion Gules gorged with an ancient Crown Or and charged on the shoulder with a Tudor Rose proper and on the sinister side a Horse Argent gorged with a like Crown pendent therefrom a Bezant charged with a Pile Sable.

Coat of arms of Berkshire County Council from 1974 to 1998

After the 1974 changes to the county council's area, two of the places referenced in the coat of arms, Uffington and Harwell, were both in Oxfordshire. A slightly modified version of the arms was therefore drawn up, replacing the white horse supporter with a black horse to represent the county's associations with horse racing, notably at Ascot and Newbury. The black horse carries a six-pointed star representing the six districts of the post-1974 county and Slough's role in the history of astronomy as the location of William and Caroline Herschel's observatory in the late 18th and early 19th centuries.

The blazon after the 1974 changes was:

- Arms: Azure two Lions passant guardant in pale each crowned with an ancient Crown Or within a Bordure embattled Ermine.
- Crest On a Wreath of the Colours upon a Mount Vert within a Mural Crown Ermine a Stag at gaze Or in front of a hollow Oak Tree leaved and fructed proper.
- Supporters On the dexter side a Lion Gules gorged with an ancient Crown Or charged on the shoulder with a Tudor Rose proper and on the sinister side a Horse Sable gorged with a like crown pendant therefrom a Mullet of six points Gold.

The coat of arms belonged to the county council as an organisation rather than to the county itself. As such, no organisation has had the right to use the arms since the county council's abolition in 1998. An attempt to have the arms transferred to the Lord Lieutenant of Berkshire was unsuccessful.

== In popular culture ==
- A fictional modern day Berkshire County Council is the main setting for BBC comedy show The Wrong Mans (2013) and the workplace for the main two characters.
