= Roseate Reading Hotel =

Boutique hotel in Reading, Berkshire, England

The Roseate Reading
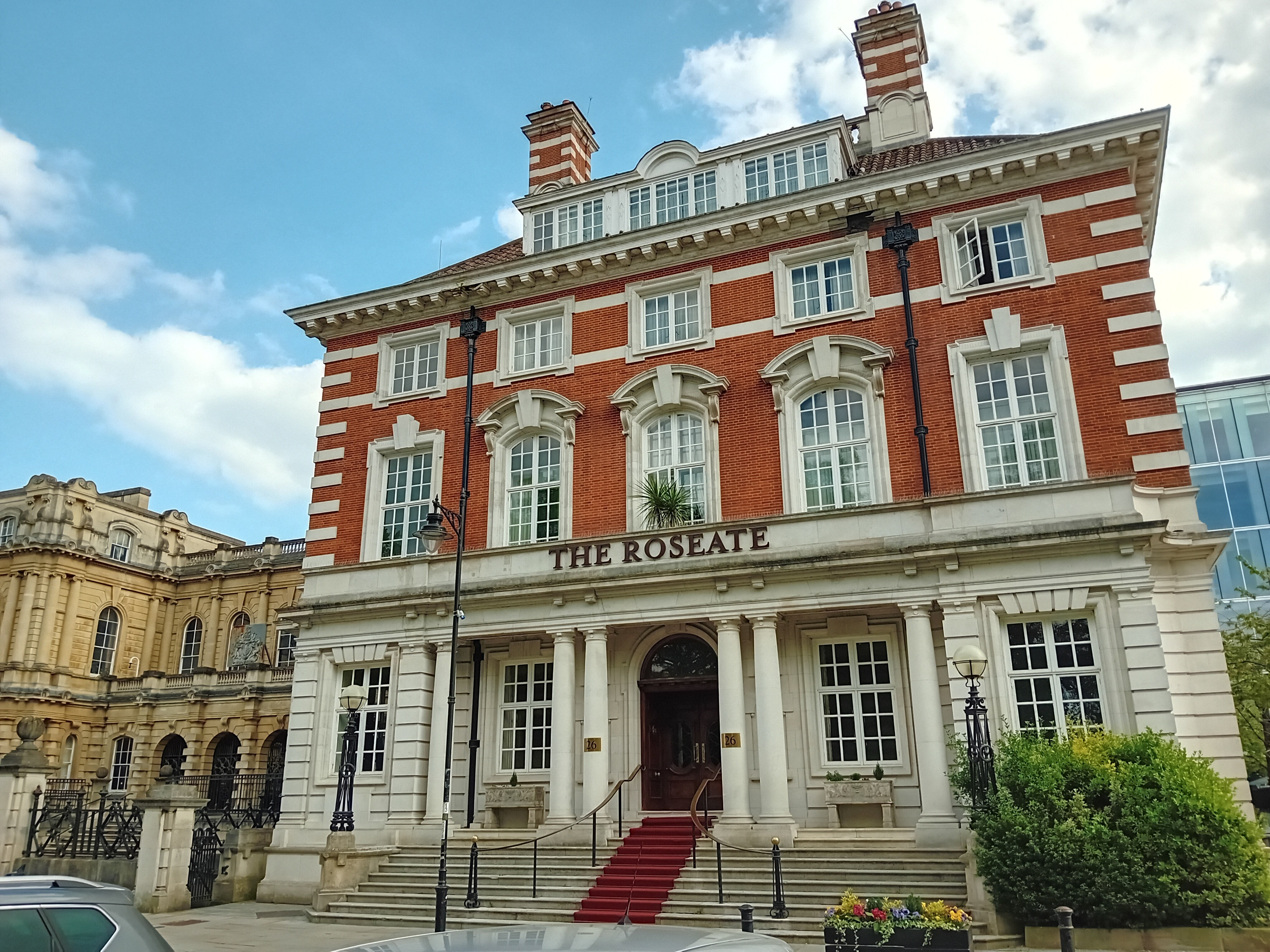
- Roseate Hotel, with Reading Crown Court to left

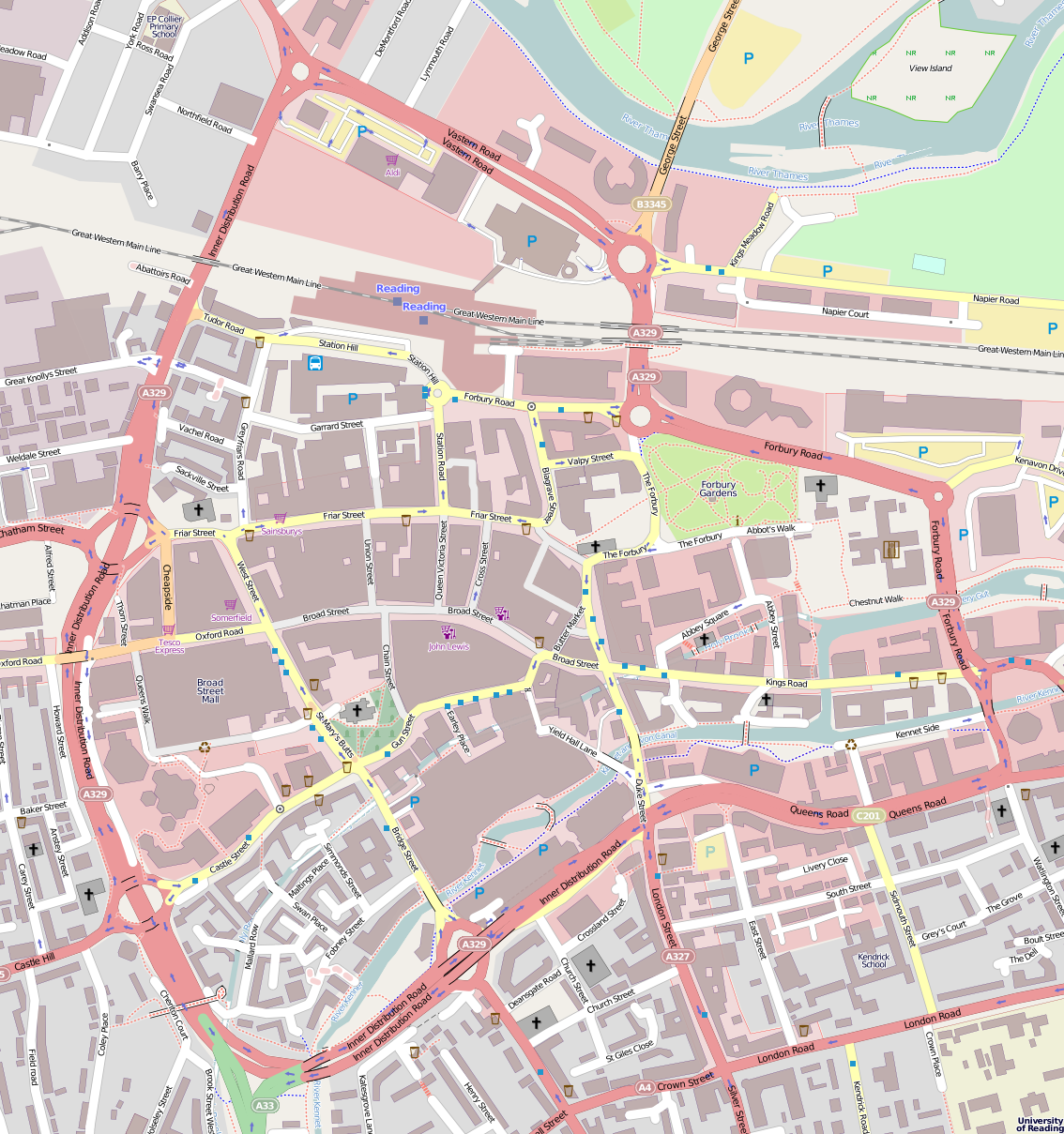
- Location within Reading Central
- Hotel chain: Bird Group

General information
- Location: Reading, Berkshire, UK, 26 The Forbury; Reading; Berkshire; RG1 3EJ
- Coordinates: 51.4562°N 0.9673°W
- Opening: 2006
- Cost: £10.2m

Technical details
- Floor count: 4

Design and construction
- Architects: Septimus Warwick; H Austen Hall

Other information
- Number of rooms: 55
- Number of restaurants: 1

Website
- roseatehotels.com/reading/theroseate/

Listed Building – Grade II
- Official name: Shire Hall, Reading
- Designated: 26 July 1973
- Reference no.: 1113475

The Roseate Reading Hotel (formerly the Forbury Hotel) is a boutique hotel in Reading, Berkshire, England. It is situated in the Forbury, formerly a part of Reading Abbey, and on the southern side of the modern Forbury Gardens. The building that forms the front section of the hotel was the Shire Hall for the County of Berkshire, built in 1911 and used as such until 1981, and is a grade II listed building.

== History ==
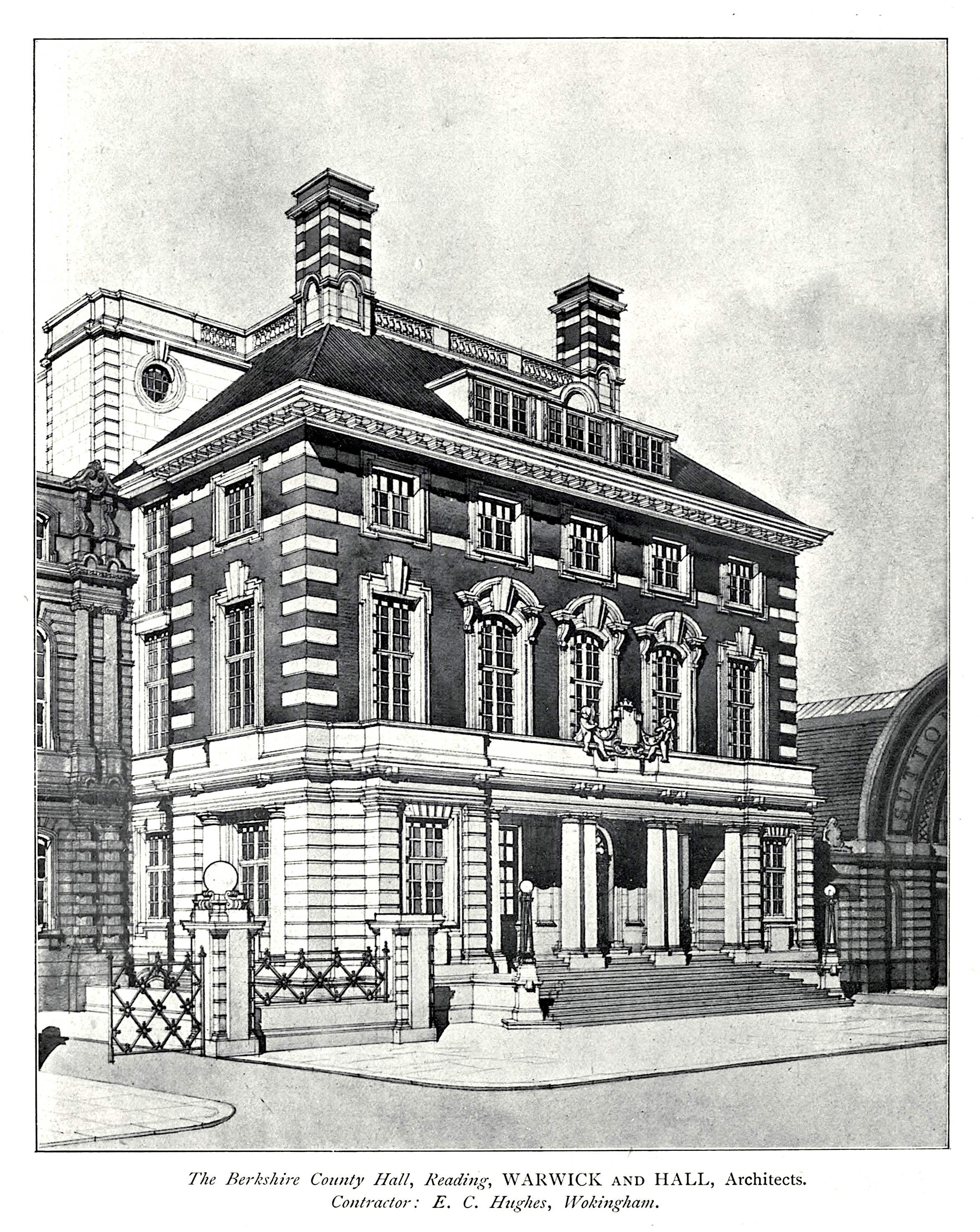
Perspective drawing of the building

Since Berkshire County Council had been formed in 1889, meetings of the full council had taken place in the assize courts. Following continuing increases in the responsibilities of the county council, county leaders chose to procure a new purpose-built Shire Hall for council officers and their departments: the site selected on the southern side of Forbury Gardens had been occupied by buildings associated with the Royal Berkshire Seed Establishment.

The new building, which was designed by Septimus Warwick and H Austen Hall in the Queen Anne style, was built by E. C. Hughes of Wokingham and opened as the Shire Hall in 1911. The design involved a symmetrical main frontage with five bays facing onto The Forbury; the ground floor, which was faced in Portland stone, featured a three-bay portico in antis with Doric order columns while the first and second floors featured casement windows with a red brick background. The building accommodated the administrative staff of Berkshire County Council while full council meetings continued to be held in the assize courts next door.

In 1981 the council moved to a new Shire Hall at Shinfield Park and subsequently the building was converted for commercial use. After renovations led by the Waterbridge Group, a developer, it re-opened as the Forbury Hotel in 2006. The council chamber was converted into a restaurant known as the "Eden Room".

In 2009 the owners got into financial difficulties and the hotel was placed in administration. After being bought out of administration by Von Essen, it was acquired by the Bird Group in 2017. Then, after the conversion of 17 apartments into 34 additional hotel bedrooms which was undertaken at a cost of £3.5 million, the hotel re-opened as the Roseate Reading in June 2019.
