= Shire Hall, Shinfield Park =

Former county building in Reading Berkshire, England

Shire Hall
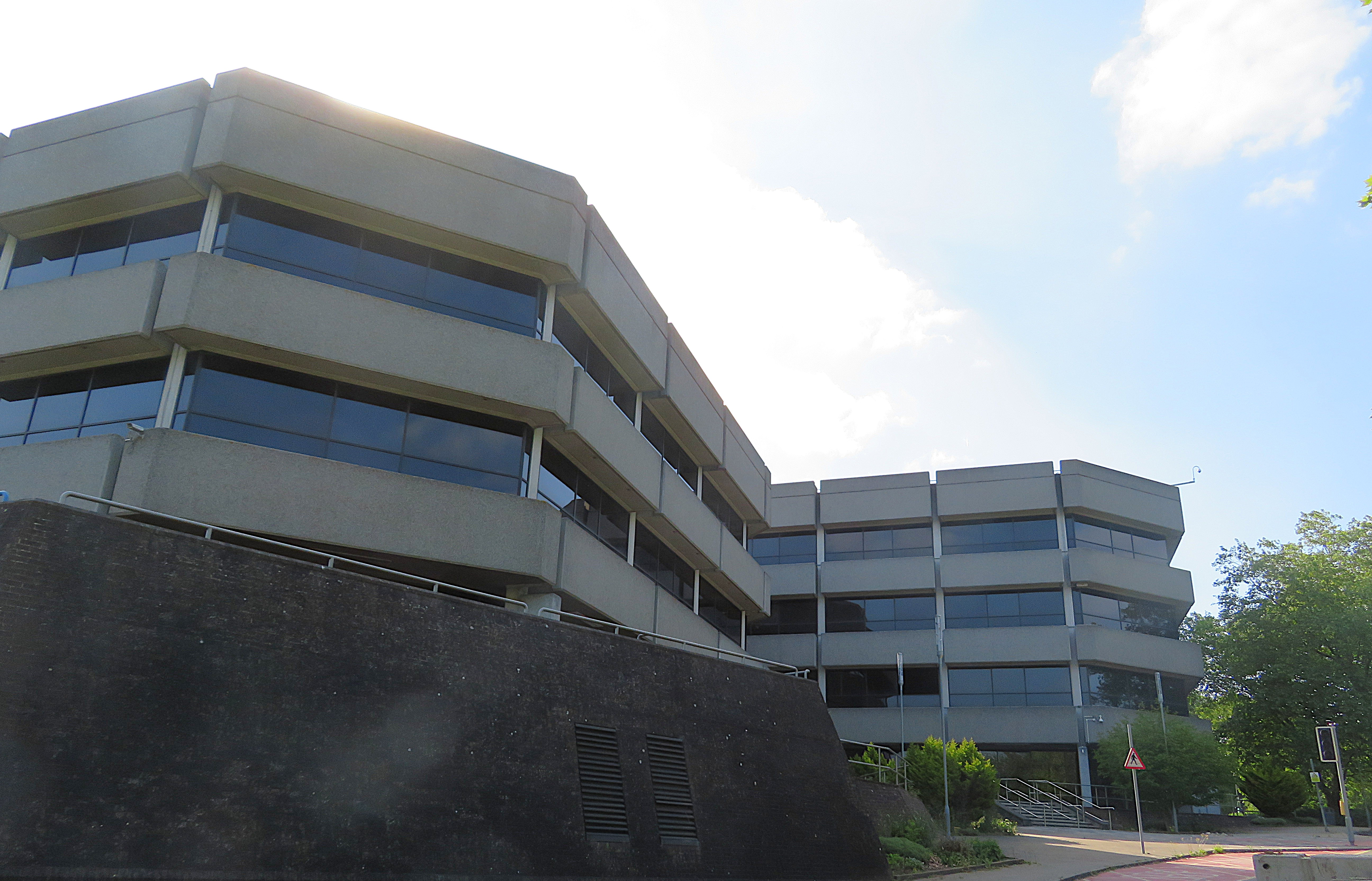
- Shire Hall in 2025 prior to demolition

- Location within Berkshire

General information
- Architectural style: Brutalist style
- Location: Shinfield Park, Reading, United Kingdom
- Coordinates: 51.4157°N 0.9545°W
- Completed: 1981
- Demolished: 2025

The Shire Hall was a former municipal building at Shinfield Park just south of Reading, Berkshire. It was the headquarters of Berkshire County Council from 1981 to 1998.

== History ==
For much of the 20th century the administration of Berkshire County Council had been carried out in the Old Shire Hall in The Forbury while meetings of the full council had taken place in the assize courts next door. Following implementation of the Local Government Act 1972, which increased the responsibilities of the county council, county leaders chose to procure a new purpose-built county headquarters: the site they initially selected was at Abbey Wharf off King's Road, but after considerable debate, they opted for a site which would be easier to develop on open land on the southern part of the Shinfield Park estate. (Note: The northern part of the estate had been occupied by Shinfield Lodge, which had been the home of Ebenezer Maitland MP in the late 18th century; it served as an RAF Station from 1940 to 1968 and then as the Meteorological Office College from 1971 to 2002. Meanwhile the southern part of the estate had been occupied by Shinfield Grove, which had once been the home of the Hulme family, before being demolished; it is this part of the site which was selected for the Shire Hall.)

The new Shire Hall, which was designed in the Brutalist style and built at a cost of £27.5 million, was completed in 1981. The design involved seven low-rise octagonal shaped buildings which all featured continuous bands of glazing with concrete panels above and below; an emergency control centre was established in the basement in case of a nuclear attack. The complex was officially opened by Queen Elizabeth II on 2 April 1982.

However following a review by the Local Government Commission the Government decided to transfer the responsibilities of the County Council to unitary authorities and the building became surplus to requirements in 1998. It became the local offices of Foster Wheeler in March 2000 and then, in October 2017, of Wood Group. In August 2024, the Wood Group moved to Green Park, closing the building.

As of February 2025, the building complex is in the process of being demolished to the foundation, and by the end of 2025 the building was completely demolished. A new five warehouse complex has been officially granted by the Wokingham Borough Council for the site.
