= 2013 Dorset County Council election =

2013 UK local government election

- 2 May 2013

All 45 seats of Dorset County Council 23 seats needed for a majority
	First party	Second party
Party	Conservative	Liberal Democrats
Last election	28 seats, 48.8%	16 seats, 35.6%
Seats before	28	16
Seats won	27	12
Seat change	▼1	▼4
Popular vote	48,874	23,233
Percentage	38.9%	18.5%
	Third party	Fourth party
Party	Labour	UKIP
Last election	0 seats, 6.0%	0 seats, 7.4%
Seats before	0	0
Seats won	5	1
Seat change	▲5	▲1
Popular vote	15,484	29,284
Percentage	12.3%	23.3%
- Map of the results of the 2013 Dorset council election.
Council control before election
Conservative
Council control after election
Conservative

An election to Dorset County Council took place on 2 May 2013 as part of the United Kingdom local elections. 45 councillors were elected from 42 electoral divisions, which returned either one or two county councillors each by first-past-the-post voting for a four-year term of office. The electoral divisions were the same as those used at the previous election in 2009. No elections were held in Bournemouth or Poole, which are unitary authorities outside the area covered by the county council. The election saw the Conservative Party maintain overall control of the council.

All locally registered electors (British, Irish, Commonwealth and European Union citizens) who were aged 18 or over on Thursday 2 May 2013 were entitled to vote in the local elections. Those who were temporarily away from their ordinary address (for example, away working, on holiday, in student accommodation or in hospital) were also entitled to vote in the local elections, although those who had moved abroad and registered as overseas electors could not vote in the local elections. It is possible to register to vote at more than one address (such as a university student who had a term-time address and lives at home during holidays) at the discretion of the local electoral register office, but it remains an offence to vote more than once in the same local government election.

== Election summary ==
The election saw the Conservatives maintain overall control of the council with a majority of 4 seats, a reduction by one seat. The Liberal Democrat group retained their status as the council's official opposition despite being reduced to 12 seats, down 4 seats. The Labour Party were the biggest winners, making their debut appearance in county hall with 5 seats. It was also the first time a UKIP candidate had been elected to the council. The council's only independent councillor lost his seat. No other parties achieved electoral representation on the council, though the Green Party contested the election in a number of divisions.

== Election result summary ==
Dorset County Council election, 2013
Party	Seats	Gains	Losses	Net gain/loss	Seats %	Votes %	Votes	+/−
Conservative	27	1	2	−1		38.89	48,874	
Liberal Democrats	12	1	5	−4		18.49	23,233	
Labour	5	5	0	+5		12.32	15,484	
UKIP	1	1	0	+1		23.30	29,284	
Independent	0	0	1	−1		2.94	3,694	
Green	0	0	0	±0		3.70	4,645	

== Election result by division ==
=== Beaminster ===
Beaminster
Party	Candidate	Votes	%
Conservative	Rebecca Knox	1,574	53.83
Liberal Democrats	Edward Gerrard	556	19.02
UKIP	Joan Bolton	457	15.63
Labour	Catherine Shaw	169	5.78
Green	Anne Elizabeth Clements	168	5.75
Turnout			43.6
Conservative hold			

=== Blackmore Vale ===
Blackmore Vale
Party	Candidate	Votes	%
Conservative	Pauline Batstone	1,557	54.48
UKIP	Alan Stewart Kewley	957	33.48
Labour	Jennifer Carol Anne Donovan	344	12.04
Turnout			34.42
Conservative gain from Liberal Democrats			

=== Blandford ===
Blandford
Party	Candidate	Votes	%
Liberal Democrats	Barrie George Cooper	861	35.73
Conservative	Nic Nicol	696	28.88
UKIP	Len Alabaster	553	22.95
Labour	Mike Owen	300	12.45
Turnout			30.69
Liberal Democrats hold			

=== Bride Valley ===
Bride Valley
Party	Candidate	Votes	%
Conservative	Ronald William Coatsworth	1,106	42.54
UKIP	Malcolm Piers-Taylor	596	22.92
Labour	Karl Gareth Wallace	343	13.19
Liberal Democrats	Terry Harrison	298	11.46
Green	Julian Stephen Langton Jones	257	9.89
Turnout			39.64
Conservative hold			

=== Bridport ===
Bridport
Party	Candidate	Votes	%
Liberal Democrats	Ros Kayes	863	33.41
Conservative	Roger John Stoodley	664	25.71
UKIP	Keith Hansford	463	17.92
Labour	Karen Ellis	404	15.64
Green	Leon Edwards	189	7.32
Turnout			34.2
Liberal Democrats hold			

=== Broadwey ===
Broadwey
Party	Candidate	Votes	%
Labour	Mark Tewkesbury	1,037	42.05
Conservative	Andy Cooke	991	40.19
Green	Brian Antony Heatley	438	17.76
Turnout			29.12
Labour gain from Conservative			

=== Burton Grange ===
Burton Grange
Party	Candidate	Votes	%
Conservative	David Charles Jones	855	43.42
UKIP	John William Dendy	703	35.70
Labour	David Stokes	411	20.87
Turnout			28.26
Conservative hold			

=== Chickerell and Chesil Bank ===
Chickerell and Chesil Bank
Party	Candidate	Votes	%
Conservative	Ian Charles Gardner	694	32.61
UKIP	Peter Reece-Edwards	600	28.20
Liberal Democrats	Vaughan Jones	463	21.76
Labour Co-op	Anne Kenwood	244	11.47
Green	Flo McIntosh	127	5.97
Turnout			33
Conservative hold			

=== Christchurch Central ===
Christchurch Central
Party	Candidate	Votes	%
Conservative	Peter Roger Alexander Hall	1,089	40.24
UKIP	Richard William Turner	991	36.62
Liberal Democrats	Dave Davies	355	13.12
Labour	Mike Woods	271	10.02
Turnout			44.59
Conservative gain from Liberal Democrats			

=== Colehill and Stapehill ===
Colehill and Stapehill
Party	Candidate	Votes	%
Liberal Democrats	Janet Dover	1,215	44.09
Conservative	David Packer	786	28.52
UKIP	Michael Wellstead	616	22.35
Labour	Simon Kapadia	139	5.04
Turnout			36.31
Liberal Democrats hold			

=== Commons ===
Commons
Party	Candidate	Votes	%
Conservative	Margaret Phipps	1,046	39.62
UKIP	Simon Boyd	770	29.17
Independent	Fred Neale	507	19.20
Labour	Peter John Stokes	173	6.55
Liberal Democrats	Martyn John Hurll	144	5.46
Turnout			31.01
Conservative hold			

=== Corfe Mullen ===
Corfe Mullen
Party	Candidate	Votes	%
Liberal Democrats	Susan Jefferies	1,230	48.25
UKIP	Dave Evans	642	25.19
Conservative	Sarah Burns	567	22.24
Labour	David Peden	110	4.32
Turnout			31.67
Liberal Democrats hold			

=== Cranborne Chase ===
Cranborne Chase
Party	Candidate	Votes	%
Conservative	Steve Butler	1,151	50.28
UKIP	Nick Jones	720	31.45
Liberal Democrats	Pamela Joan Sylvester	235	10.27
Labour	Haydn Roger White	183	8
Turnout			33.23
Conservative hold			

=== Dorchester ===
Dorchester (2 seats)
Party	Candidate	Votes	%
Liberal Democrats	David Trevor Jones	2,131	21.39
Liberal Democrats	Richard Martin Biggs	1,940	19.47
Conservative	Vivienne Jennifer Allan	1,055	10.59
UKIP	Geoffrey Robin Markham	956	9.60
Conservative	Glyn Hudson Gaskarth	916	9.20
UKIP	Jeffrey St Aubyn	821	8.24
Labour Co-op	Vicki Black	706	7.09
Labour Co-op	Barry Thompson	579	5.81
Green	Libby Goodchild	540	5.42
Green	Len Herbert	318	3.19
Turnout			33.82
Liberal Democrats hold			
Liberal Democrats hold			

=== Edgdon Heath ===
Edgdon Heath
Party	Candidate	Votes	%
Conservative	Peter Wharf	1,044	39.92
Liberal Democrats	Alex Brenton	759	29.02
UKIP	Rex Ernest Johnson	622	23.79
Labour	Rosemary Phillips	190	7.27
Turnout			37.4
Conservative gain from Liberal Democrats			

=== Ferndown ===
Ferndown (2 seats)
Party	Candidate	Votes	%
UKIP	Ian Michael Smith	2,222	23.26
Conservative	John Leslie Wilson	2,187	22.89
Conservative	Derek Burt	2,085	21.82
UKIP	Peter Jonathan Lucas	2,027	21.22
Labour	Marion Lock	567	5.93
Labour	Gail Cropper	466	4.88
Turnout			31.65
UKIP gain from Conservative			
Conservative hold			

=== Gillingham ===
Gillingham
Party	Candidate	Votes	%
Conservative	David Walsh	917	36.46
Independent	David Milsted	840	33.40
UKIP	Lester Geoffrey Taylor	495	19.68
Labour	Bob Messer	263	10.46
Turnout			33.17
Conservative gain from Liberal Democrats			

=== Hambledon ===
Hambledon
Party	Candidate	Votes	%
Conservative	Deborah Croney	1,671	60.99
Independent	Bob Trethewey	478	17.45
Liberal Democrats	Hugo Anthony Mieville	328	11.97
Labour	Keith Yarwood	263	9.60
Turnout			32.43
Conservative hold			

=== Highcliffe and Walkford ===
Highcliffe and Walkford
Party	Candidate	Votes	%
Conservative	Colin Peter Jamieson	1,422	49.67
UKIP	Philip Glover	1,120	39.12
Labour	Donald Barr	321	11.21
Turnout			36.76
Conservative hold			

=== Linden Lea ===
Linden Lea
Party	Candidate	Votes	%
Liberal Democrats	Andy Canning	1,239	41.83
Conservative	Mary Penfold	1,164	39.30
Labour Co-op	Andy Hutchings	305	10.30
Green	Hilary Jane Woodall	254	8.58
Turnout			37.6
Liberal Democrats gain from Conservative			

=== Lodmoor ===
Lodmoor
Party	Candidate	Votes	%
Liberal Democrats	David George Mannings	1,175	39.80
Conservative	Ian Cameron Bruce	1,118	37.87
Labour	Richard Baker	438	14.84
Green	Richard Baker	221	7.49
Turnout			40.69
Liberal Democrats hold			

=== Lytchett ===
Lytchett
Party	Candidate	Votes	%
Liberal Democrats	Fred Drane	1,156	40.01
Conservative	Michael Fry	905	31.33
UKIP	Colin Woodbridge Plant	643	22.26
Labour	Brian Chivers	185	6.40
Turnout			32.37
Liberal Democrats hold			

=== Marshwood Vale ===
Marshwood Vale
Party	Candidate	Votes	%
Conservative	Daryl Whane Turner	1,332	51.65
Liberal Democrats	Patrick William James Hicks	696	26.99
Green	Chit Chong	322	12.49
Labour	Richard Howard Nicholls	229	8.88
Turnout			36.72
Conservative hold			

=== Minster ===
Minster
Party	Candidate	Votes	%
Conservative	Robin David Cook	883	36.73
Liberal Democrats	David Morgan	757	31.49
UKIP	Nicholas Wellstead	553	23.00
Labour	Richard Denton-White	211	8.78
Turnout			30.97
Conservative hold			

=== Mudeford and Highcliffe ===
Mudeford and Highcliffe
Party	Candidate	Votes	%
Conservative	Lesley Margaret Dedman	1,736	56.58
UKIP	Brian Hogger	999	32.56
Labour	Carol Ann Wilcox	333	10.85
Turnout			40.06
Conservative hold			

=== Portland Harbour ===
Portland Harbour
Party	Candidate	Votes	%
Labour Co-op	Kate Wheller	944	49.79
Conservative	Ian Munro-Price	369	19.46
Independent	Geoffrey George Petherick	316	16.67
Green	Lee Dalton	177	9.34
Liberal Democrats	Oz Kanji	90	4.75
Turnout			27.43
Labour Co-op gain from Conservative			

=== Portland Tophill ===
Portland Tophill
Party	Candidate	Votes	%
Labour Co-op	Paul Kimber	460	21.64
UKIP	Alan Ackroyd	418	19.66
Independent	Rachel Doris Barton	368	17.31
Independent	Les Ames	356	16.75
Conservative	Tim Munro	222	10.44
Liberal Democrats	Sue Lees	138	6.49
Independent	Sylvia Linda Bradley	81	3.81
Green	Sue Sutton	64	3.01
United People's Party	Josephine Olive Bray	19	0.89
Turnout			32.46
Labour Co-op gain from Independent			

=== Purbeck Hills ===
Purbeck Hills
Party	Candidate	Votes	%
Conservative	Michael William John Lovell	1,007	49.75
Independent	Nigel Dragon	723	35.72
Labour	Andrea Etherington	294	14.53
Turnout			37.49
Conservative hold			

=== Rodwell ===
Rodwell
Party	Candidate	Votes	%
Labour	Dan Brember	722	29.24
Conservative	Claudia Lucienne Webb	583	23.61
Green	Clare Louise Sutton	565	22.88
UKIP	Don Telfer	467	18.92
Liberal Democrats	Steph Taylor	132	5.35
Turnout			36.15
Labour gain from Conservative			

=== Shaftesbury ===
Shaftesbury
Party	Candidate	Votes	%
Liberal Democrats	Mervyn Jeffery	596	32.52
Conservative	Gary Jefferson	575	31.37
UKIP	Lynda Judith Dixon	485	26.46
Labour	Joseph Pestell	177	9.66
Turnout			30.91
Liberal Democrats hold			

=== Sherborne ===
Sherborne
Party	Candidate	Votes	%
Conservative	Robert Andrew Gould	1,161	42.30
Liberal Democrats	Matt Hall	795	28.96
UKIP	David Graham Savile Platt	466	16.98
Green	Susan Greene	170	6.19
Labour	Diana Ruth Staines	153	5.57
Turnout			39
Conservative hold			

=== Sherborne Rural ===
Sherborne Rural
Party	Candidate	Votes	%
Conservative	Michael James Bevan	1,258	37.15
Liberal Democrats	Robin Andrew Shane Legg	1,168	34.50
UKIP	Oliver Marshall Chisholm	746	22.03
Green	Michael Riley	129	3.81
Labour	Nigel Mykura	85	2.51
Turnout			43.56
Conservative hold			

=== St Leonards and St Ives ===
St Leonards and St Ives
Party	Candidate	Votes	%
Conservative	Peter William Richardson	1,118	47.17
UKIP	Robin Francis Grey	1,116	47.09
Labour	Heather Jean Snow	136	5.74
Turnout			38.76
Conservative hold			

=== Stour Vale ===
Stour Vale
Party	Candidate	Votes	%
Conservative	Andrew Ronald Cattaway	1,215	50.90
UKIP	Richard William Lucas	490	20.53
Independent	Ian Stewart	474	19.86
Labour	Philip Jacques	208	8.71
Turnout			34.2
Conservative hold			

=== Swanage ===
Swanage
Party	Candidate	Votes	%
Conservative	William Stanley Trite	1,378	49.23
UKIP	Alan Smith	630	22.51
Labour Co-op	Rupert Roker	446	15.93
Liberal Democrats	Peter Benwell Clark	345	12.33
Turnout			34.98
Conservative hold			

=== Three Valleys ===
Three Valleys
Party	Candidate	Votes	%
Conservative	Jill Haynes	1,266	41.73
UKIP	Jack St. Aubyn	636	20.96
Liberal Democrats	Iain Douglas Young	546	18.00
Labour Co-op	Lesley Begley	300	9.89
Green	Peter John Barton	286	9.43
Turnout			36.8
Conservative hold			

=== Verwood and Three Legged Cross ===
Verwood and Three Legged Cross (2 seats)
Party	Candidate	Votes	%
Conservative	Toni Bartley Coombs	1,838	26.35
Conservative	Spencer Grant Flower	1,773	25.42
UKIP	John Baxter	1,280	18.35
UKIP	Roy Wetherall	1,240	17.70
Liberal Democrats	Joe Hickish	297	4.26
Labour	Heather Ann Clarke	288	4.13
Labour	Dennis Wardleworth	259	3.71
Turnout			30.66
Conservative hold			
Conservative hold			

=== Wareham ===
Wareham
Party	Candidate	Votes	%
Liberal Democrats	Beryl Rita Ezzard	1,047	42.08
Conservative	Barry Michael Quinn	667	26.81
UKIP	Keith Allen Simpson	565	22.71
Labour	James Sebastian Selby Bennett	209	8.40
Turnout			36.92
Liberal Democrats hold			

=== West Moors and Holt ===
West Moors and Holt
Party	Candidate	Votes	%
Conservative	Peter Finney	1,194	48.52
UKIP	Dave Butt	1,012	41.12
Labour	Michael Shine	255	10.36
Turnout			32.78
Conservative hold			

=== Westham ===
Westham
Party	Candidate	Votes	%
Liberal Democrats	David Best Harris	1,000	46.28
Labour	Lucy Hamilton	636	29.43
Conservative	Richard Laurence Kazimierz Kosior	346	16.01
Green	Miles Wheller	179	8.28
Turnout			30.39
Liberal Democrats hold			

=== Weymouth Town ===
Weymouth Town
Party	Candidate	Votes	%
Labour	Mike Byatt	501	25.10
UKIP	Francis George Drake	475	23.80
Liberal Democrats	Christine James	400	20.04
Conservative	Roger John George Costello	379	18.99
Green	Jon Orrell	241	12.07
Turnout			25.48
Labour gain from Liberal Democrats			

=== Winterborne ===
Winterbourne
Party	Candidate	Votes	%
Conservative	Hilary Ann Cox	1,314	51.51
UKIP	Geoff Lambert	732	28.69
Liberal Democrats	Christopher Michael Tomlinson	278	10.90
Labour	Kim Alywin Fendley	227	8.90
Turnout			33.37
Conservative hold			

== By-elections between 2013 and 2017 ==
=== Rodwell ===
A by-election was held for the Rodwell ward of Dorset County Council on 12 November 2015 following the resignation of Labour councillor Dan Brember due to work commitments.

Rodwell by-election 12 November 2015
Party	Candidate	Votes	%	±%
Green	Clare Louise Sutton	663	34.9	
Conservative	Richard Nickinson	561	29.5	
Labour	Hazel Priest	417	21.9	
UKIP	Francis George Drake	174	9.1	
Liberal Democrats	Graham Winter	87	4.6	
Turnout				
Green gain from Labour		Swing		

=== Sherborne Rural ===
A by-election was held for the Sherborne Rural division of Dorset County Council on 2 June 2016 following the resignation of Conservative councillor Michael Bevan for health and family reasons.

Sherborne Rural by-election 2 June 2016
Party	Candidate	Votes	%	±%
Liberal Democrats	Matthew Nathan William Hall	1,287	49.61	
Conservative	Mary Penfold	1,212	46.72	
Labour Co-op	Geoff Freeman	95	3.66	
Turnout			33.84	
Liberal Democrats gain from Conservative		Swing		

=== Ferndown ===
A by-election was held for the Ferndown division of Dorset County Council on 1 September 2016 following the death of Conservative councillor John Wilson.

Ferndown
Party	Candidate	Votes	%	±%
Conservative	Steven Michael Lugg	2,046		
UKIP	Peter Jonathan Lucas	1,092		
Liberal Democrats	Jason Darryl Jones	260		
Labour	Peter John Stokes	190		
Turnout			22.08	
Conservative hold		Swing		

Another by-election was held for the Ferndown division of Dorset County Council on 1 December 2016 following the resignation of UKIP councillor Ian Michael Smith.

Ferndown
Party	Candidate	Votes	%	±%
Conservative	Andrew Charles Parry	1,463		
UKIP	Lawrence Leslie Ralph Wilson	831		
Liberal Democrats	Jason Darryl Jones	301		
Labour	Peter John Stokes	160		
Turnout			17.15	
Conservative gain from UKIP		Swing		
