= Lionel Earle =

British civil servant

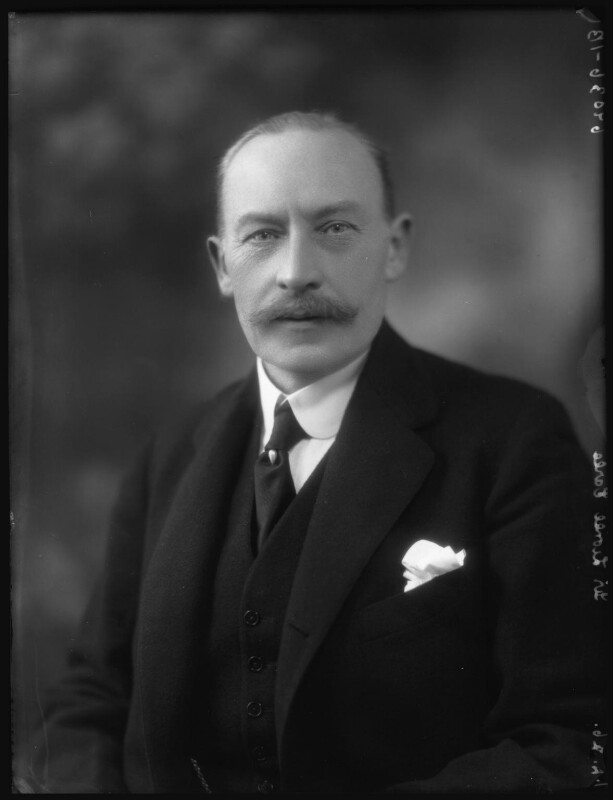
Earle in 1926

Sir Lionel Earle, GCVO KCB CMG (1 February 1866 – 10 March 1948) was a British civil servant.

== Early life and education ==
Earle was born in Marylebone, London, in 1866. He was the second son of Charles William Earle, a captain of the Rifle Brigade, and Maria Theresa Villiers, a popular horticultural writer as Mrs C. W. Earle, and the daughter of Edward Ernest Villiers. He was educated at Marlborough College and studied languages at Göttingen University and the Sorbonne. He initially intended to become a surgeon, but his relatives (although not his liberal parents) strongly opposed the idea, and instead he spent a year at Merton College, Oxford, in 1886 studying for the diplomatic service exam. He failed to achieve a sufficient grade to enter the service, and left Oxford without taking a degree.

== Career ==
Earle spent some time in business, and then was appointed assistant secretary to the Royal Commission on the Paris Exhibition in 1898. On 15 January 1900, he was appointed an acting second secretary in the diplomatic Service. He transferred to Ireland in September 1902, when he was appointed an additional private secretary to Lord Dudley, the recently created Lord Lieutenant of Ireland, and served as such until the following year. In 1907, he stood unsuccessfully for a seat on the London County Council on a progressive, free-trade platform. He was private secretary to Lord Crewe from 1907 to 1910, and to Lord Harcourt in 1910–12.

In 1912, Prime Minister H. H. Asquith, a family friend, offered Earle the position of permanent secretary to the Office of Works; he accepted, and remained in the position until his retirement in 1933. Earle was passionately interested in the arts and matters of aesthetic taste, and was widely regarded as a lay expert; he consequently had an unusual degree of dominance over the department. Between 1927 and 1930 he sat on the Royal Commission on National Museums and Galleries, he was a trustee of the Wallace Collection, and was chairman of the Ancient Monuments Board for England (later incorporated into English Heritage). He was particularly well known for his improvements to the Royal Parks.

As the most senior official continuous serving in the Office of Works during the period after the First World War, Earle had a great deal of personal influence on the creation of London's war memorials. Stephen Heathorn has argued that "it is probable that the vast majority of final decisions regarding public art and memorial projects between 1918 and 1933 made at Works were in fact Earle's". His predominant concerns were, on the one hand, an "essentially Victorian" belief in the didactic role of monuments in contributing grandeur to the imperial capital, and on the other hand a desire to avoid the strident militarian associated with public memorials in Prussia. His own preference was for an avenue carrying on "the width of Portland Place through Regent’s Park to Highgate, with a fine monumental triumphal arch at the crest of the hill; it would have made not only a highway far more impressive than the Champs Élysées in Paris, but a worthy memorial to commemorate, for all time, the heroic struggle of the British Empire". He tended toward conservatism in his own taste, but recognised a need for modern war memorials to reflect the spirit of the time, and publicly defended some pieces which were avant-garde to the point of controversy, such as Jacob Epstein's controversial Rima in Hyde Park and Alfred Hardimann's Haig.

In 1935, he published his autobiography, Turn Over the Page.

Earle was appointed a Knight Commander of the Order of the Bath (KCB) in the 1916 New Year Honours, a Knight Commander of the Royal Victorian Order (KCVO) in 1921 and a Knight Grand Cross of the Royal Victorian Order (GCVO) in 1933. He was also a Commander of the Belgian Order of the Crown.

== Sources ==
- Concise Dictionary of National Biography.
