= Whitehall =

Road in the City of Westminster, in Central London

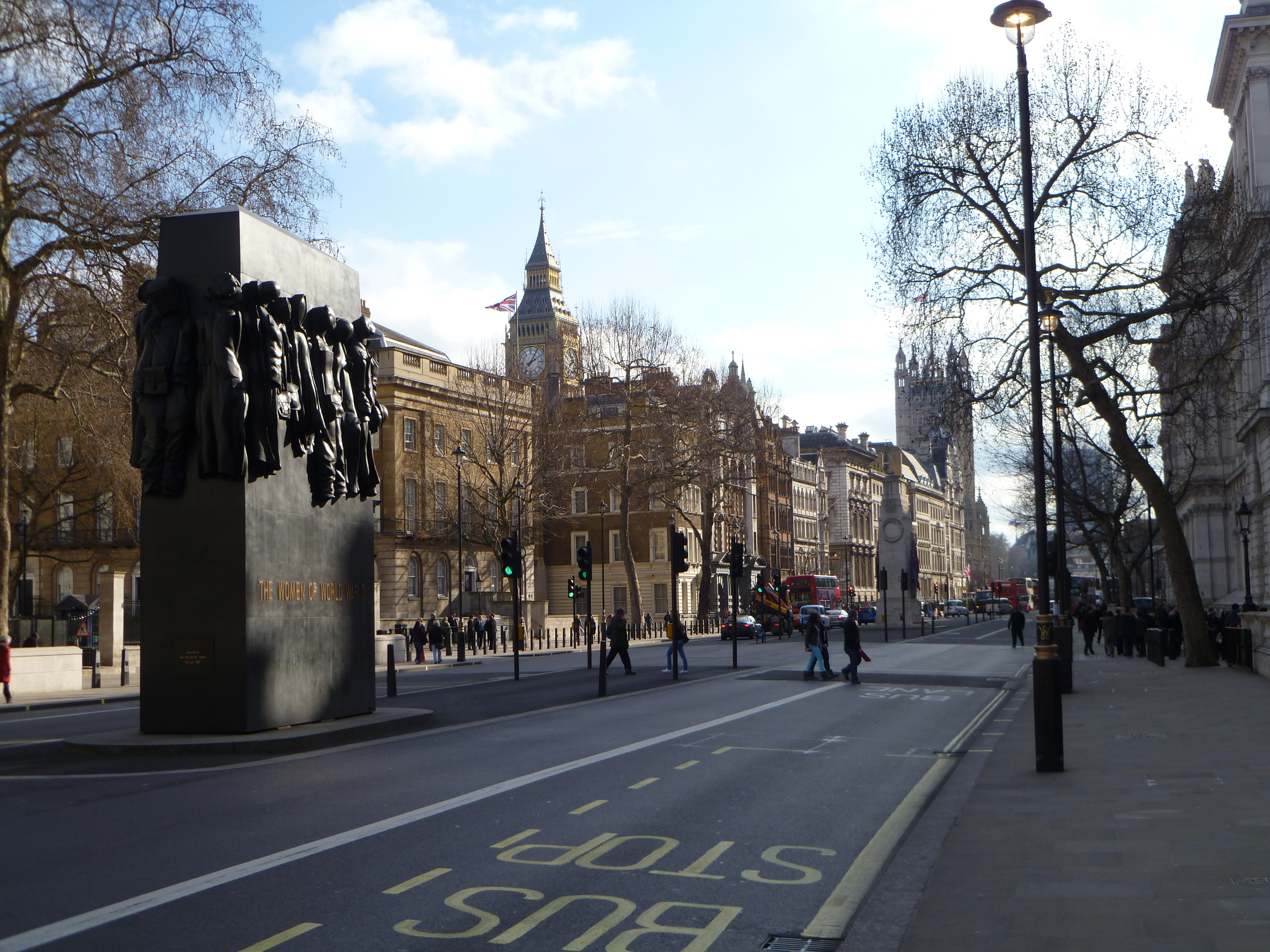
- Whitehall pictured in 2012, with The Cenotaph (distant) and Monument to the Women of World War II in the middle of the carriageway, and the Elizabeth Tower housing Big Ben in the background.

- Location within City of Westminster
- Former names: The Street, King Street
- Part of: A3212
- Maintained by: Transport for London
- Length: 0.4 mi (0.64 km)
- Location: Westminster, London
- Postal code: SW1
- Nearest Tube station: Charing Cross; Westminster
- Coordinates: 51°30′15″N 00°07′35″W
- North end: Trafalgar Square
- South end: The Cenotaph

Other
- Known for: Downing Street; Ministry of Defence; War Office; Department of Health

Whitehall is a road and area in the City of Westminster, Central London, England. The road forms the first part of the A3212 road from Trafalgar Square to Chelsea. It is the main thoroughfare running south from Trafalgar Square towards Parliament Square. The street is recognised as the centre of the Government of the United Kingdom and is lined with numerous departments and ministries, including the Ministry of Defence, Horse Guards, the Cabinet Office, and much of the Foreign Office. Consequently, the name "Whitehall" is used as a metonym for the British civil service and government, and as the geographic name for the surrounding area.

The Palace of Whitehall previously occupied the area and was the residence of Kings Henry VIII through to William III, before it was destroyed by fire in 1698; only the Banqueting House has survived. Whitehall was originally a wide road that led to the gates of the palace; the route to the south was widened in the 18th century, following the destruction of the palace, and the area was largely rebuilt for government offices.

As well as government buildings, the street is known for its memorial statues and monuments, including the UK's primary war memorial, the Cenotaph. South of the Cenotaph the thoroughfare becomes Parliament Street. The Whitehall Theatre (now the Trafalgar Studios) was formerly associated with a series of farces.

== Geography and name ==
The name Whitehall was used for several buildings in the Tudor period. It either referred to a building made of light stone, or as a general term for any festival building. This included the Royal Palace of Whitehall, which in turn gave its name to the street.

The street is about 0.4 miles (0.64 km) long and runs through the City of Westminster. It is part of the A3212, a main road in Central London that leads towards Chelsea via the Houses of Parliament and Vauxhall Bridge. It runs south from Trafalgar Square, past numerous government buildings, including the old War Office building, Horse Guards, the Ministry of Defence, the Cabinet Office, and the Department of Health. It ends at the Cenotaph, the road ahead being Parliament Street. Great Scotland Yard and Horse Guards Avenue branch off to the east, while Downing Street branches off to the west at the southern section of the street.

The nearest tube stations are Charing Cross at the north end, and Westminster at the south. Numerous London bus routes run along Whitehall, including 12, 24, 88, 159 and 453.

== History ==
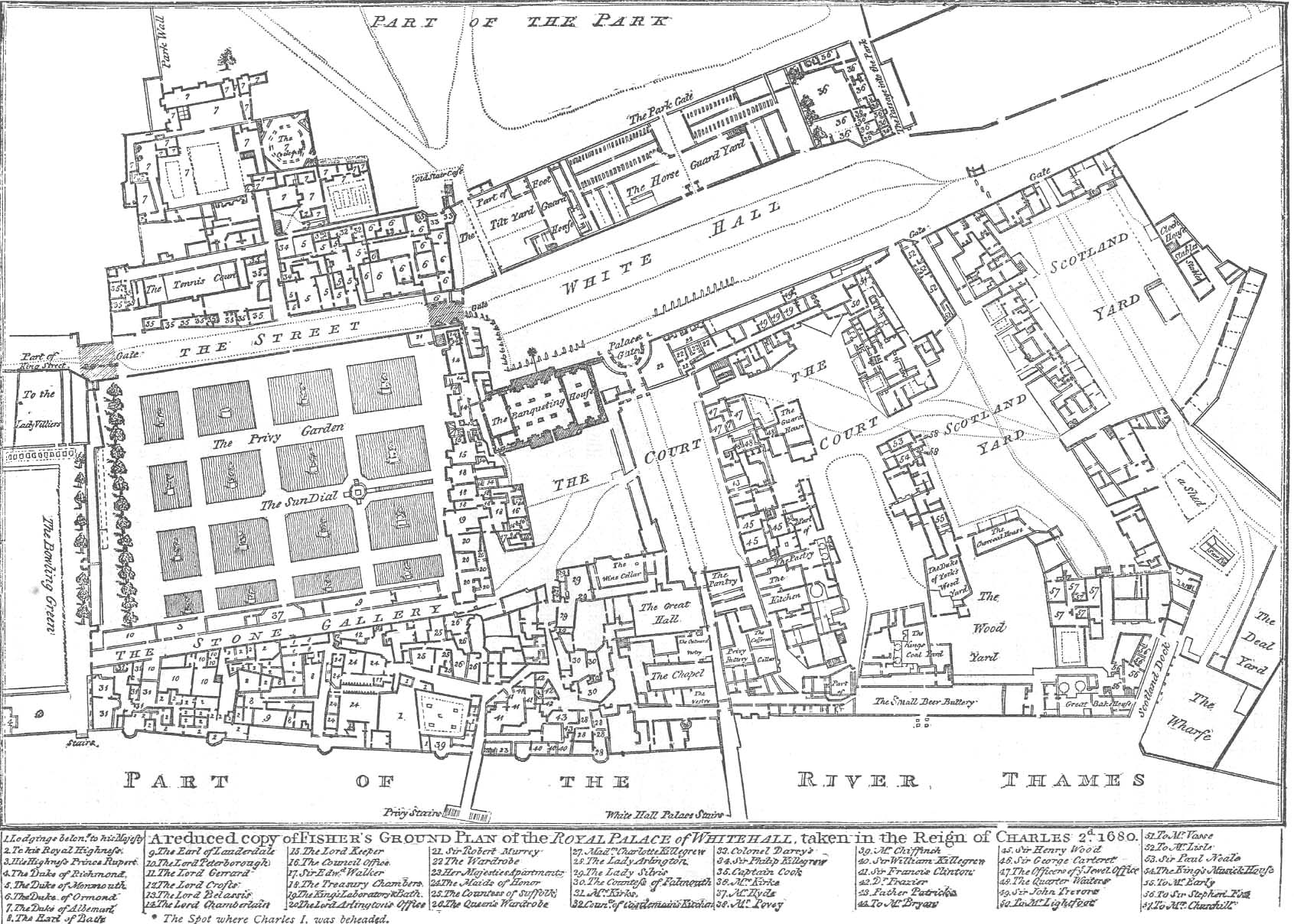
Map of Whitehall in 1680, showing the Palace of Whitehall and Scotland Yard. To the west of Holbein Gate, the road was known as The Street.

There has been a route connecting Charing Cross to Westminster since the Middle Ages; the 12th-century historian William Fitzstephen described it as "a continued suburb, mingled with large and beautiful gardens, and orchards belonging to the citizens". The name Whitehall was originally only used for the section of road between Charing Cross and Holbein Gate; beyond this it was known as The Street as far as King Street Gate, then King Street thereafter. It had become a residential street by the 16th century, and had become a popular place to live by the 17th, with residents including Lord Howard of Effingham and Edmund Spenser.

The Palace of Whitehall, to the east of the road, was originally named York Palace, but was renamed during the reign of Henry VIII. (Note: Shakespeare's Henry VIII mentions the name change in Act IV, scene 1: "You must no more call it York Place—that is past: For since the Cardinal fell that title's lost; 'Tis now the King's, and called Whitehall") The palace was redesigned in 1531–32 and became the King's main residence later in the decade. He married Anne Boleyn here in 1533, followed by Jane Seymour in 1536, and died at the palace in 1547. Charles I owned an extensive art collection at the palace and several of William Shakespeare's plays had their first performances here. It ceased to be the royal residence after 1689, when William III moved to Kensington Palace for his health to escape what had become dense urban surroundings. The palace was damaged by fire in 1691, following which the front entrance was redesigned by Sir Christopher Wren. In 1698, most of the vast palace burned to the ground accidentally after a fire started by a careless washerwoman.

Wallingford House's construction began in 1572 by Sir Francis Knollys along the western edge of Whitehall. The Duke of Buckingham bought the house in 1622, and it was subsequently used by Charles I. During the reign of William III, it was bought for the Admiralty. The Old Admiralty Buildings now sit on the house's site.

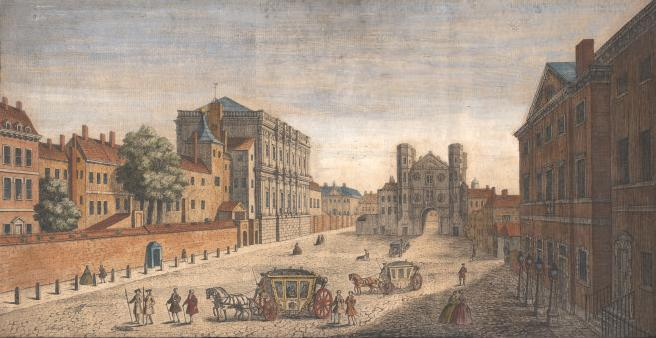
Whitehall, looking south in 1740: Inigo Jones' Banqueting House (1622) on the left, William Kent's Treasury buildings (1733–37) on the right, the Holbein Gate (1532, demolished 1759) at centre.

Banqueting House was built as an extension to the Palace of Whitehall in 1622 by Inigo Jones. It is the only surviving portion of the palace after it was burned down, and was the first Renaissance building in London. It later became a museum to the Royal United Services Institute and has been opened to the public since 1963.

Oliver Cromwell moved to the street in 1647, taking up residence in Wallingford House. Two years later, Charles I was carried through Whitehall on the way to his trial at Westminster Hall. Whitehall itself was a wide street and had sufficient space for a scaffold to be erected for the King's execution at Banqueting House. He made a brief speech there before being beheaded. (Note: The English Civil War Society commemorate the death of Charles I annually on the nearest Sunday to 30 January, the anniversary of the execution. The society retraces the route the King took from St James's Palace to the Banqueting House, where a wreath is laid at the site of the scaffold.) Cromwell died at the Palace of Whitehall in 1658.

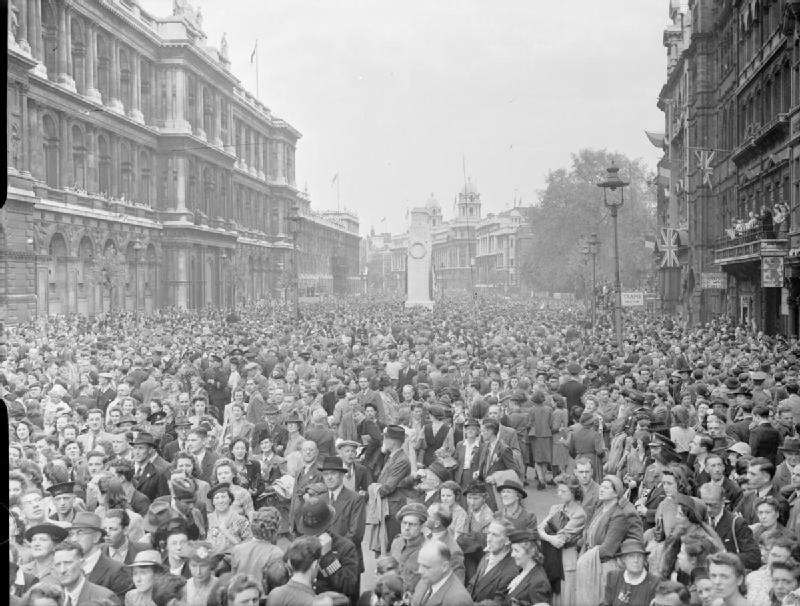
People gathered in Whitehall to hear Winston Churchill's victory speech, 8 May 1945

During the Great Plague of London in 1665, people boarded coaches at Whitehall, then at the edge of urban London, in an attempt to escape. The King and court temporarily moved to Oxford to avoid the plague, while Samuel Pepys remarked in his diary on 29 June, "By water to Whitehall, where the Court is full of waggons and people ready to go out of town. This end of town every day grows very bad with plague".

By the 18th century, traffic was struggling along the narrow streets south of Holbein Gate, which led to King Street Gate being demolished in 1723. Holbein Gate, in turn, was demolished in 1759. Meanwhile, Parliament Street was a side road alongside the palace, leading to the Palace of Westminster. After the Palace of Whitehall was destroyed, Parliament Street was widened to match Whitehall's width. The present appearance of the street dates from 1899 after a group of houses between Downing Street and Great George Street were destroyed.

On 8 March 1973, the IRA detonated a bomb in front of the Ministry of Agriculture building in Whitehall, injuring a number of bystanders. On 7 February 1991, the IRA launched a mortar attack on 10 Downing Street in an unsuccessful attempt to assassinate Prime Minister John Major and his cabinet.

== Government buildings ==
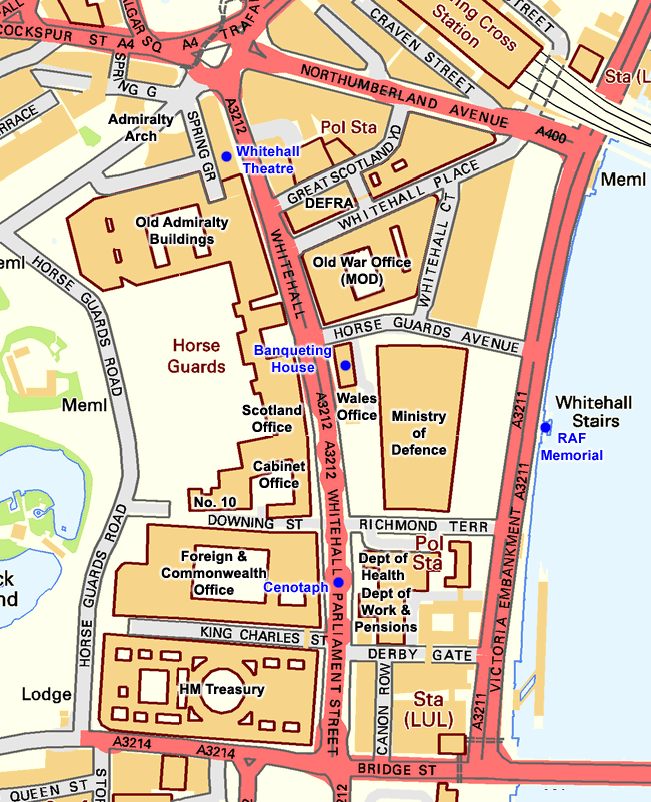
Map of Whitehall and surrounding streets, showing government buildings

By the time the palace was destroyed, separation of crown and state had become important, with Parliament being necessary to control military requirements and pass laws. The government wanted to be some distance from the monarch, and the buildings around Whitehall, physically separated from St James's Palace by St James's Park, seemed to be a good place for ministers to work.

The Horse Guards building was designed by William Kent, and built during the 1750s on a former tiltyard site, replacing an earlier guard-house erected during the Civil War. The building includes an archway for coach traffic and two pedestrian arches that provide access between Whitehall and Horse Guards Parade. The central archway is marked with "SMF" and "StMW", and denotes the boundary between St Martin-in-the-Fields and St Margaret's church parish boundaries.

During the 19th century, as private leases ran out on residential buildings, ownership reverted to the Crown, which began to use them as public offices. The name "Whitehall" is now used as a metonym to refer to that part of the civil service which is involved in the government of the United Kingdom. The street's central portion is dominated by military buildings, including the Ministry of Defence, with the former headquarters of the British Army and Royal Navy, the Royal United Services Institute, the Horse Guards building and the Admiralty, on the opposite side. Government buildings on Whitehall, from north to south, include The Admiralty Buildings, the Department for International Development at No. 22, the Department of Energy and Climate Change at No. 55, the Old War Office, the Office of the Parliamentary Counsel at No. 36, the Horse Guards, the Ministry of Defence Main Building, Dover House (containing the Scotland Office), Gwydyr House (containing the Wales Office), the Cabinet Office at No. 70, the Foreign and Commonwealth Office and the Government Offices Great George Street (HM Treasury, HM Revenue and Customs and parts of the Cabinet Office).

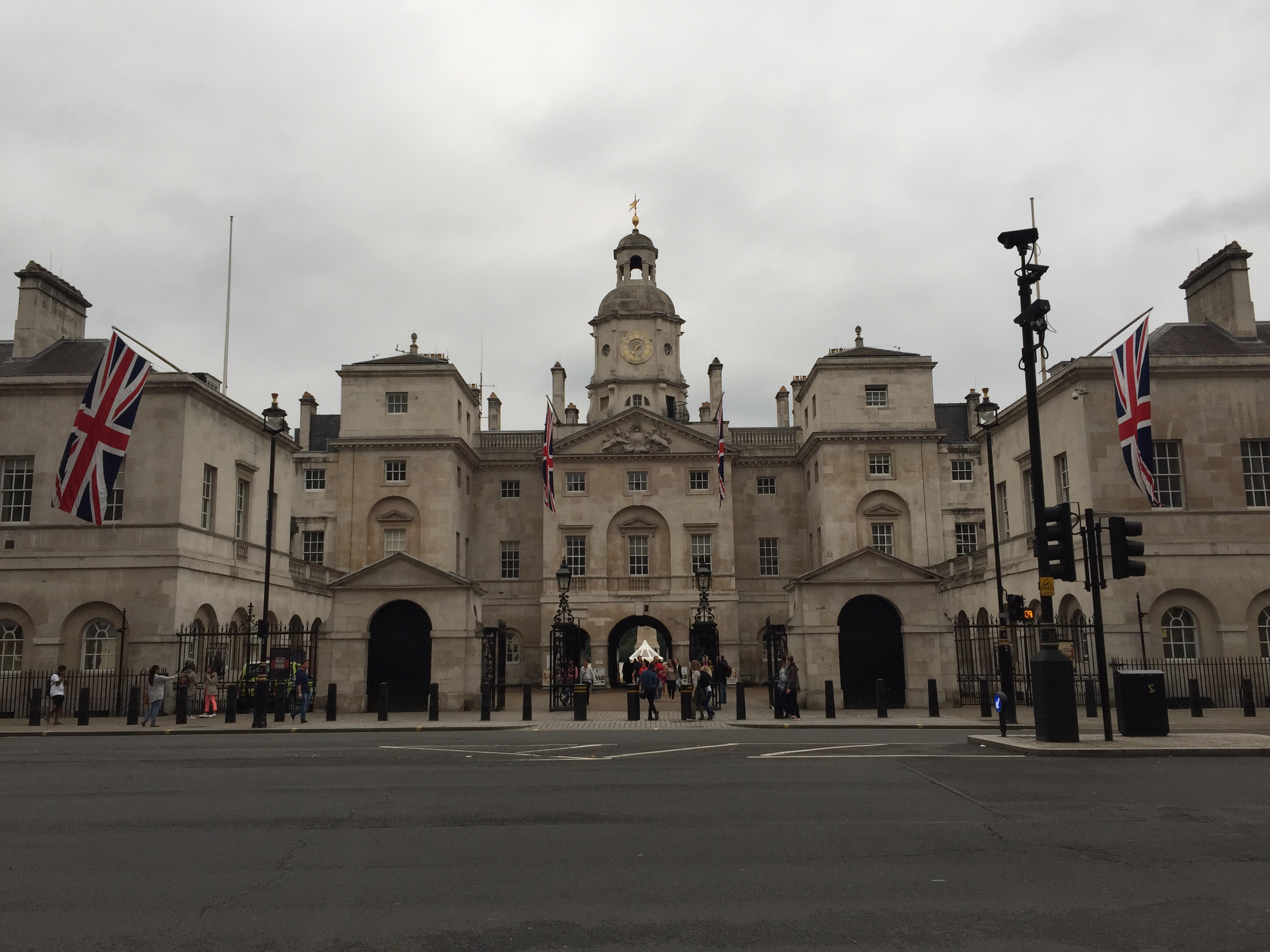
View of the Horse Guards Building from Whitehall, showing the three arches that link it to Horse Guards Parade

Scotland Yard, the headquarters of London's Metropolitan Police Service, was originally located in Great Scotland Yard off the north-eastern end of Whitehall. The buildings had been lodgings for the Kings of Scotland, on part of the old Palace of Whitehall's grounds; by the 19th century, Little and Middle Scotland Yard had been merged into Whitehall Place, leaving only Great Scotland Yard. No. 4 Whitehall Place had become vacant by the 1820s, which allowed Sir Robert Peel to use it as the main headquarters when forming the police in 1829. It was formally named the Metropolitan Police Office, but became quickly known as Great Scotland Yard, and eventually Scotland Yard. The buildings were damaged in a series of bombings by Irish nationalists in 1883, and an explosion from a Fenian terrorist attack on 30 May 1884 blew a hole in Scotland Yard's outer wall and destroyed the neighbouring Rising Sun pub. The headquarters was moved away from Whitehall in 1890.

Downing Street leads off the south-west end of Whitehall, just above Parliament Street. It was named after Sir George Downing, who built a row of houses along the street around 1680 leading west from Whitehall. Following a number of terrorist attacks, the road was closed to the public in 1990, when security gates were erected at both ends. On 7 February 1991, the Provisional IRA fired mortars from a van parked in Whitehall towards No. 10, one of which exploded in the gardens.

Additional security measures have been put in place along Whitehall to protect government buildings, following a £25 million streetscape project undertaken by Westminster City Council. The project has provided wider pavements and better lighting, along with installing hundreds of concrete and steel security barriers.

Richmond House, at No. 79, has held the Department of Health since 1987. The building was scheduled to be a temporary debating chamber from 2025, while the Houses of Parliament undergo a refurbishment and modernisation programme.

== Memorials ==
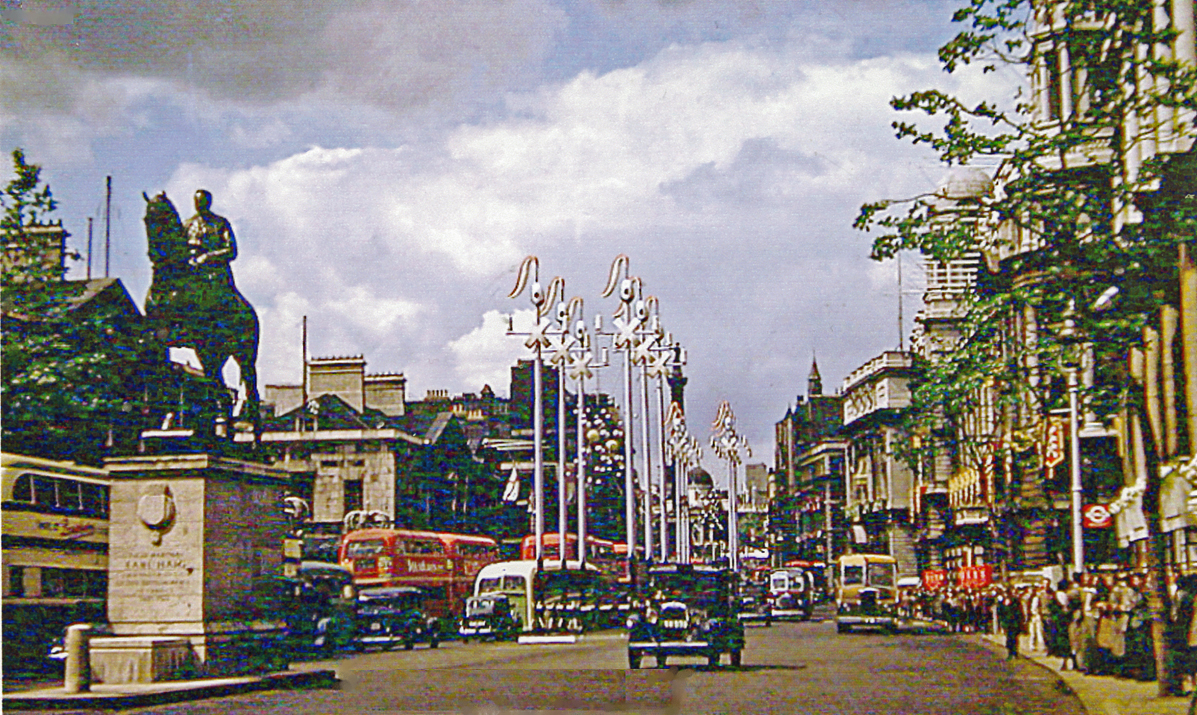
Whitehall, looking north in 1953, with the Earl Haig Memorial in the middle of the carriageway.

Statues and memorials have been built on and around Whitehall, commemorating military victories and leaders. The Cenotaph was designed by Sir Edwin Lutyens and erected at the southern end in 1919, commemorating victory in World War I and later used as a memorial for both World Wars. It is the main war memorial in Britain and an annual service is held here on Remembrance Sunday, led by the reigning monarch and leading politicians. In 2005, a national Monument to the Women of World War II was erected a short distance north of the Cenotaph in the middle of the Whitehall carriageway.

The Royal Tank Regiment Memorial is at the north east end of Whitehall, where Whitehall Court meets Whitehall Place. Erected in 2000, it commemorates the use of tanks in both World Wars and depicts five World War II tank crew members. The Gurkha Memorial is to the south of this, on Horse Guards Avenue to the east of Whitehall.

Whitehall is also home to six other monuments. From north to south, these are of Prince George, Duke of Cambridge (Commander-in-Chief of the British Army), Liberal Party, Liberal Unionist Party and Unionists leader Spencer Cavendish, 8th Duke of Devonshire, Douglas Haig, 1st Earl Haig (known as the Earl Haig Memorial), (Note: The memorial, designed by Alfred Frank Hardiman and unveiled on 10 November 1937, proved controversial as it took several attempts to design a realistic head and horse. Haig's widow refused to attend the opening ceremony.) Field Marshal Montgomery (commander of the 8th Army, the 21st Army Group and Chief of the Imperial General Staff), William Slim, 1st Viscount Slim, Commander of the 14th Army and Governor-General of Australia, and Alan Brooke, 1st Viscount Alanbrooke, Chief of the Imperial General Staff.

== Culture ==
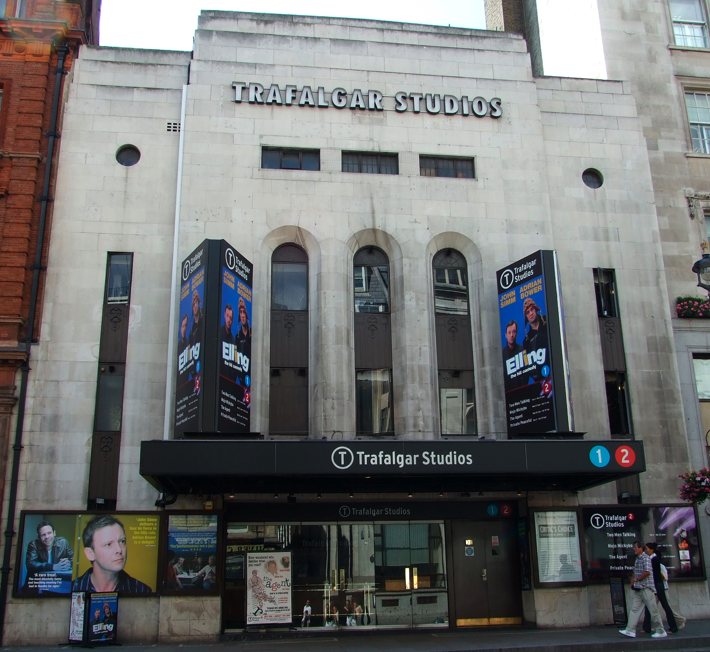
The Whitehall Theatre, now Trafalgar Studios, opened in 1930 and is a Grade II listed building.

The Whitehall Theatre opened in 1930 at the north west end of the street, on a site that had previously been Ye Old Ship Tavern in the 17th century. The revue Whitehall Follies opened in 1942, which drew controversy over its explicit content featuring the stripper and actress Phyllis Dixey. The theatre became known for its series of farces, reviving a tradition on Whitehall that had begun with court jesters at the palace during the 16th century; these included several plays featuring actor-manager Brian Rix throughout the 1950s and '60s, and 1981's satirical Anyone for Denis, written by John Wells and Private Eye editor Richard Ingrams. The venue was Grade II listed in 1996 and renamed the Trafalgar Studios in 2004.

Because of its importance as the centre of the British government, several political comedies are based in and around Whitehall. These include the BBC television series Yes Minister and The Thick of It.

Whitehall is one of three purple squares on the British Monopoly board, along with Pall Mall and Northumberland Avenue. All three streets converge at Trafalgar Square.

Due to its proximity to government buildings, Whitehall has been a notable location for public demonstrations, including protests organised by The Palestine Coalition, which garnered media attention in 2026 when several pro-Palestine protesters were arrested by the Metropolitan Police for chanting 'globalise the intifada.'

== See also ==
- Curtis Green Building
- Whitehall Study
