= Slough Town Hall =

Municipal building in Slough, Berkshire, England

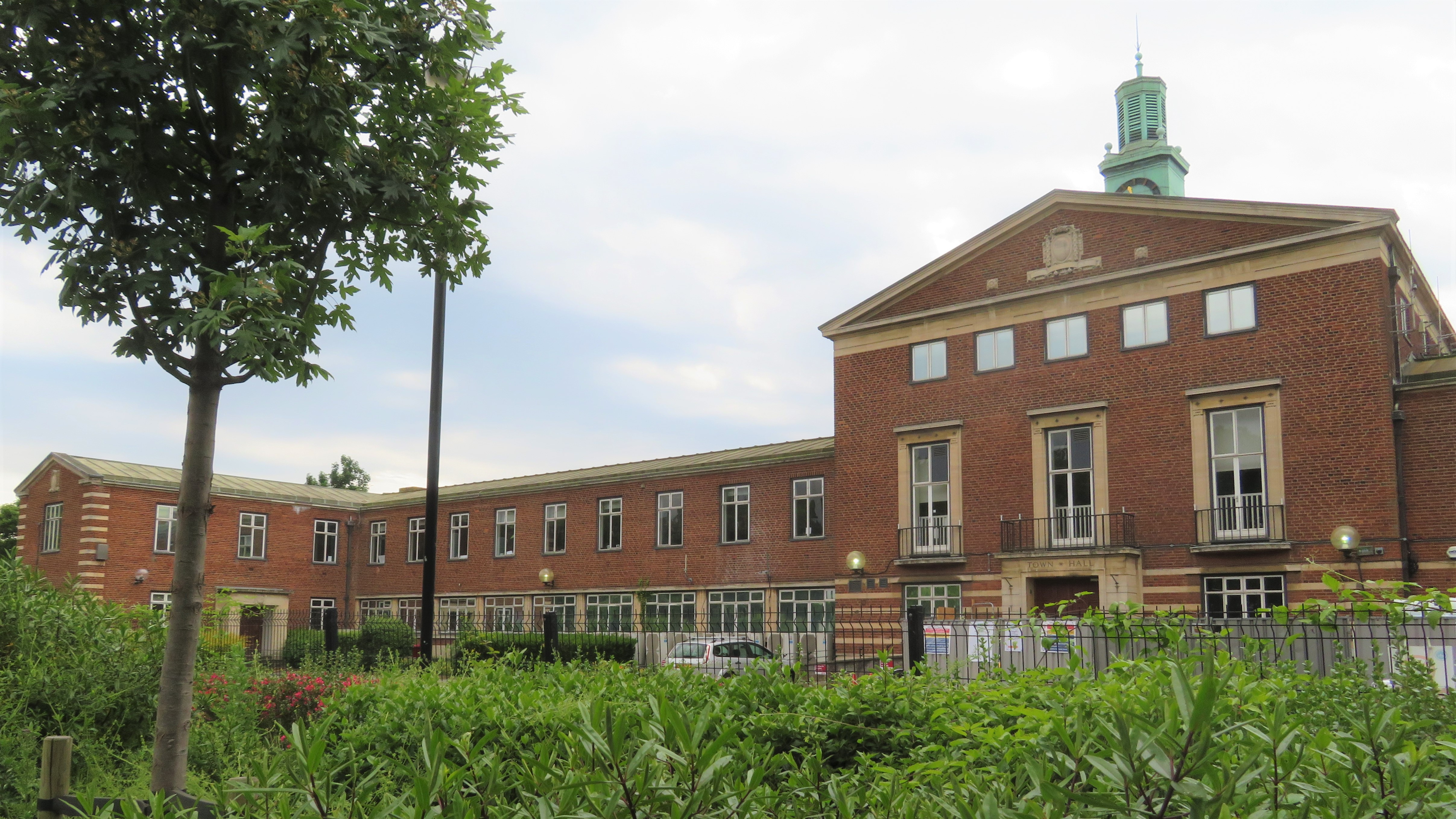
- Slough Town Hall

- Shown in Berkshire
- 51.5109°N 0.6050°W
- Location: 19 Bath Road, Slough

History
- Built: 1937

Site notes
- Architect(s): Charles Holloway James and Stephen Rowland Pierce
- Architectural style: Neo-Georgian style

Slough Town Hall is a former municipal building in Bath Road, Slough, Berkshire, England. The town hall was the headquarters of Slough Borough Council until 2011. The building has been used as a school since 2012.

== History ==
From 1909 until 1937, Slough Urban District Council was based at a converted house called "The Cedars" at 4 William Street. Following significant population growth, largely associated with the development of the local industrial estate by The Slough Trading Co., civic leaders decided to procure a purpose-built town hall: the site they selected was open land on the south side of Bath Road situated among a row of large residential properties. The chosen site was relatively detached from the town centre, being 0.5 miles (0.80 km) west of the main shopping areas on High Street.

The project was the subject of a design competition assessed by Harry Stuart Goodhart-Rendel and won by Charles Holloway James and Stephen Rowland Pierce. The new building was designed in the Neo-Georgian style, built in red brick with stone dressings and completed in 1937. The building was officially opened on 31 March 1937 by Sarah Trevener, wife of the chairman of the urban district council, Arthur George Trevener.

The design involved an asymmetrical main frontage with fifteen bays facing onto Bath Road; the central section of three bays, which slightly projected forward, featured a doorway flanked by stone pilasters supporting an entablature bearing the words "Town Hall". There were three tall windows with stone surrounds and iron balconies on the first floor, five small square windows on the second floor and a large pediment containing the town's coat of arms in the tympanum: there was a clock tower with a belfry and finial at roof level. To the left there was a wing of ten bays with the end bay projected forward as a pavilion but to the right there was wing of just two bays suggesting that the architects had identified this area for future expansion. Internally, the principal room was the council chamber which benefited from fine oak and walnut panelling.

Following further industrial development the area was advanced to the status of municipal borough with the town hall as its headquarters in 1938. Although highly critical of what he perceived as the overdevelopment of Slough, the future Poet Laureate, Sir John Betjeman, described the architecture of the building favourably, as "a striving for unity out of chaos". The building continued to serve as the headquarters of the local borough council for the rest of the 20th century and remained the local seat of government after the enlarged Slough District Council was formed in 1974. Councillor Lydia Simmons became the UK's first black mayor at the town hall in May 1984.

However, in 2008, the Slough Borough Council, which had become the unitary authority for the area in 1997, decided to close the town hall and to temporarily relocate its staff to a nearby office building at St Martin's Place, 51 Bath Road, pending a more permanent home for the council being found closer to the town centre. The council proposed that, in order to maximise the value of the site, the town hall should be demolished and site used for residential development. English Heritage recommended that the building be included, as a listed building, on the National Heritage List for England but, in February 2010, the Department for Digital, Culture, Media and Sport decided to disregard the advice and ruled that the building should not be listed. The Twentieth Century Society unsuccessfully tried to have that decision overturned, saying that it believed that "the redevelopment of the town hall would be an act of vandalism to the civic centre". The council held its last meeting in the town hall on 19 December 2011.

Although the building had not been listed, it was decided not to demolish it after all. The town hall building was subsequently refurbished at a cost of £1.5 million and was re-opened as a primary school in 2012, with the building now being called Old Town Hall, 19 Bath Road. Slough Borough Council later acquired Observatory House at 25 Windsor Road in 2018 to become its new headquarters in the town centre.
