= Aubrey Ward =

British veterinarian and politician

Sir Aubrey Ernest Ward JP DL (17 April 1899 – 14 June 1987) was a British veterinarian, Liberal Party politician, Mayor of Slough, and Chairman of Buckinghamshire County Council.

== Background ==
He was the son of Edward Alfred Ward. He was educated at the Royal Veterinary College, London. In 1919 he married Mary Jane Davidson Rutherford MB ChB. She died in 1979. They had one daughter. He was knighted in the 1967 Birthday Honours.

== Professional career ==
He served in the War of 1914–18 as a Night Flying Officer in the Royal Flying Corps. In 1923 he opened a Veterinary practice which he went on to run until retiring in 1966.

== Political career ==
He entered local government politics being elected to the Municipal Borough of Slough representing Upton Ward. In 1940 he was elected by the council to serve as Mayor of Slough. In 1941 he was elected by the council to sit as an Alderman. He continued to serve as the borough's Mayor until 1945. He was the unsuccessful Liberal candidate for the Eton and Slough constituency in Buckinghamshire at the 1945 General Election. He did not stand for parliament again.

=== Election result ===
General Election 1945: Eton and Slough
Party	Candidate	Votes	%	±%
Labour	Benn Wolfe Levy	25,711	45.5	N/A
Conservative	Edward Charles Cobb	23,287	41.2	N/A
Liberal	Aubrey Ernest Ward	7,487	13.3	N/A
Majority		2,424	4.3	N/A
Turnout		56,485	71.9	N/A
Registered electors		78,512		
Labour gain from new seat		Swing	N/A	

In 1957 he became a Justice of the peace. In 1961 he became an Honorary Freeman of the Borough of Slough. In 1963 he was appointed a Deputy Lieutenant for Buckinghamshire. In 1963 he became Chairman of Buckinghamshire County Council, serving in that role for the next eleven years. In 1964 he was appointed Vice-Chairman of the Thames Conservancy Board, serving in that role for ten years.

== See also ==
- List of mayors of Slough
- Eton and Slough (UK Parliament constituency)
