= Margaret Calkin James =

British artist

- Margaret Calkin James
- Born: Margaret Calkin; June 1895; West Hampstead, London
- Died: 1985 (aged 89–90)
- Education: Central School of Arts and Crafts; Westminster School of Art
- Known for: Painter and graphic designer
- Spouse: Charles Holloway James

Margaret Calkin James (June 1895 – 1985) was a calligrapher, graphic designer, textile printer, watercolour painter and printmaker. She is best known for her posters designed for the London Underground and London Transport between 1928 and 1935.

== Early life ==

Margaret Calkin James was born in Emmanuel, West Hampstead, the third of seven children of Harry Bernard Calkin (1861–1926), a senior underwriter at Lloyd's of London and Margaret Agnes Palfrey (1870–1936), daughter of Penry Powell Palfrey (1830–1902), a well-known artist in stone and stained glass.

She attended North London Collegiate School from 1909 to 1913. She was a student at the Central School of Arts and Crafts between 1913 and 1915, specialising in calligraphy and winning the Queen's Scholarship in her final year. She then enrolled at the Westminster School of Art. In June 1922 she married Charles Holloway James, a distinguished architect who trained under Sir Edwin Lutyens. After her marriage she worked from a studio at her home. They had a son and two daughters. Her younger daughter, Elizabeth Argent, lived in Alcester till her death in 2016. Her grandchildren Alison, Jennifer, Nicholas and Jeremy continue to promote their grandmother's legacy.

== Career ==
Work by James was displayed at The Rainbow Workshops in Great Russell Street in Bloomsbury, which she opened in 1920. It was one of the first galleries started by a woman to promote art, craft and design. She lived and worked at Lapstone Farm, in Chipping Campden during World War II. She designed posters for London Transport, book jackets for Jonathan Cape, pattern papers for the Curwen Press, programmes and booklets for the BBC and a greetings telegram for the GPO. Some of her textiles were used at the new Norwich City Hall in 1938.

== Later life ==
In the late 1960s James suffered a stroke, paralysing her right side and depriving her of speech. Undaunted, she started a series of wool embroidery designs using her left hand. She died in 1985.

== See also ==
- Robert Gibbings
