= Stephen Rowland Pierce =

British architect (1896–1966)

Stephen Rowland Pierce F.R.I.B.A, F.S.A. (1896–1966) was an architect and town planning consultant. In partnership with Charles Holloway James he designed several large British public buildings, including Norwich City Hall.

In 1921, Pierce won the British Prix de Rome in Architecture of the British School at Rome, and afterwards became a member of the Faculty of Architecture. Elected A.R.I.B.A. in 1929 and F.R.I.B.A. in 1938, he was council’s critic for the R.I.B.A. prizes and studentships, joint secretary of the R.I.B.A. exhibition committee and assessor in competitions conducted by the Institute. From 1936 to 1942 Pierce was director of architectural studies at the Hastings School of Art.

The most important building on which Pierce and Charles Holloway James were engaged was the City Hall at Norwich, the commission for which James won in open competition. The designs were exhibited at the Royal Academy in 1933 and 1934, and the City Hall was completed and opened by King George VI in October, 1938. Standing in a commanding position above the market place, the Norwich municipal offices have been described as one of the most satisfying civic buildings in the country, dignified in general form and interesting in details. A slightly Swedish flavour dates the building as belonging to the period between the wars.

Other civic buildings in which Pierce had a hand were the County Hall, Hertford (1939) and Slough Town Hall (1937).

From 1941 to 1942, Pierce was lecturer at the School of Architecture at Manchester University. He served as a town planning consultant to Malta, Norwich, Leamington Spa, Southampton, among other towns, He was a member of the Council and Vice-President R.I.B.A. from 1951–55. Pierce was also vice-chairman, Faculty of Architecture at the British School at Rome.

In 1930, he married Betty Scott, A.R.I.B.A., daughter of Roderick Mackenzie Scott.
