= Penry Powell Palfrey =

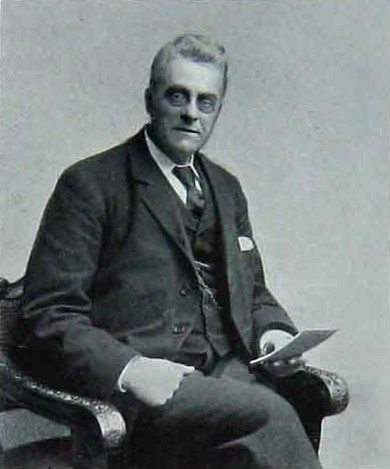
Penry Powell Palfrey

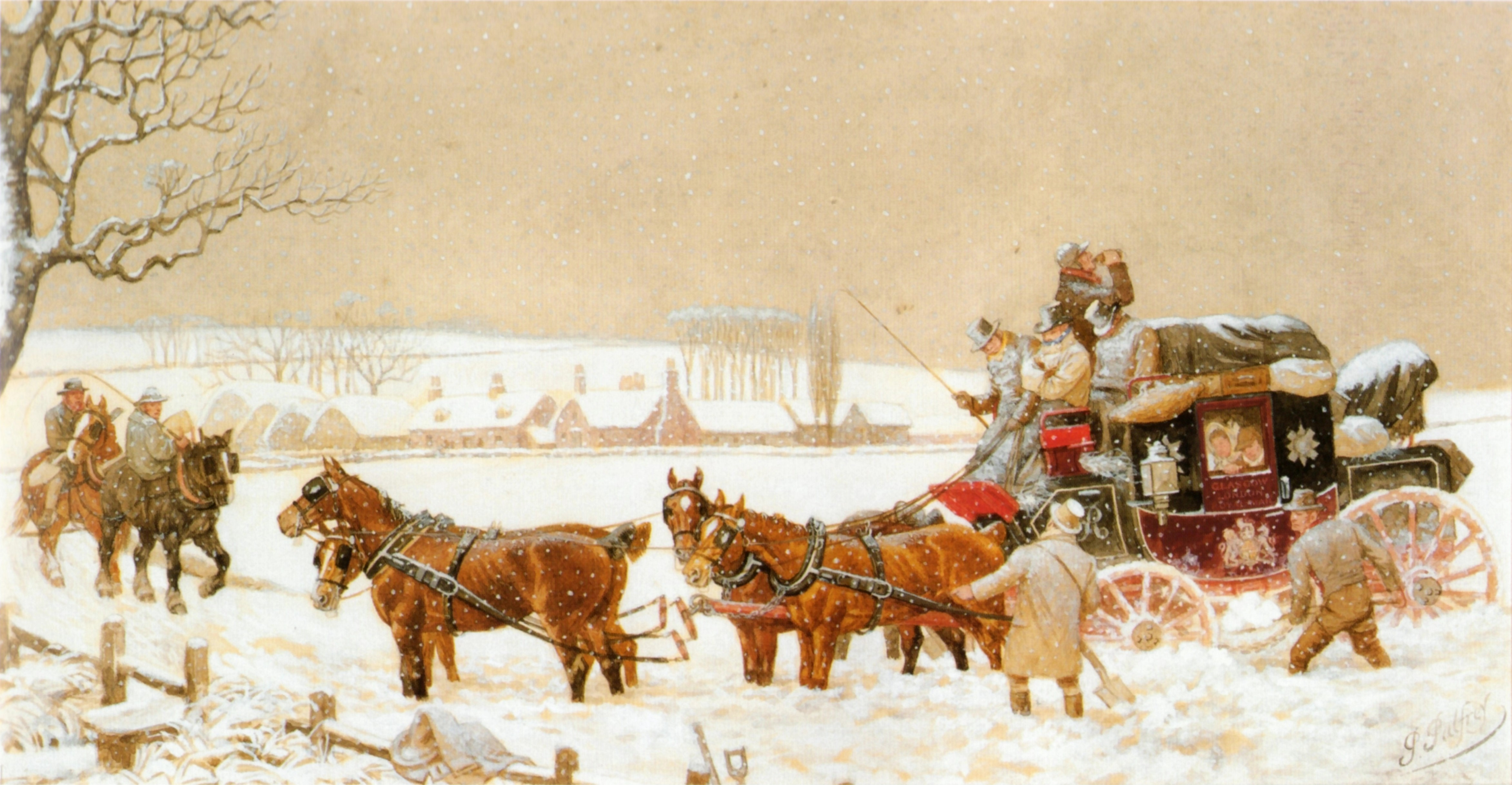
A winter coaching scene by Penry Powell Palfrey. Watercolour, 1880.

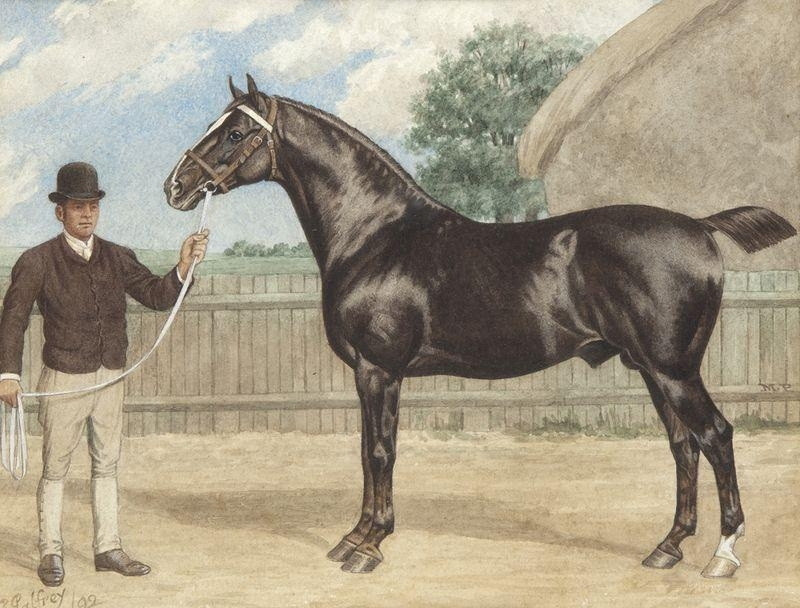
Horse portrait and his lad by Penry Powell Palfrey. Watercolour, n.d.

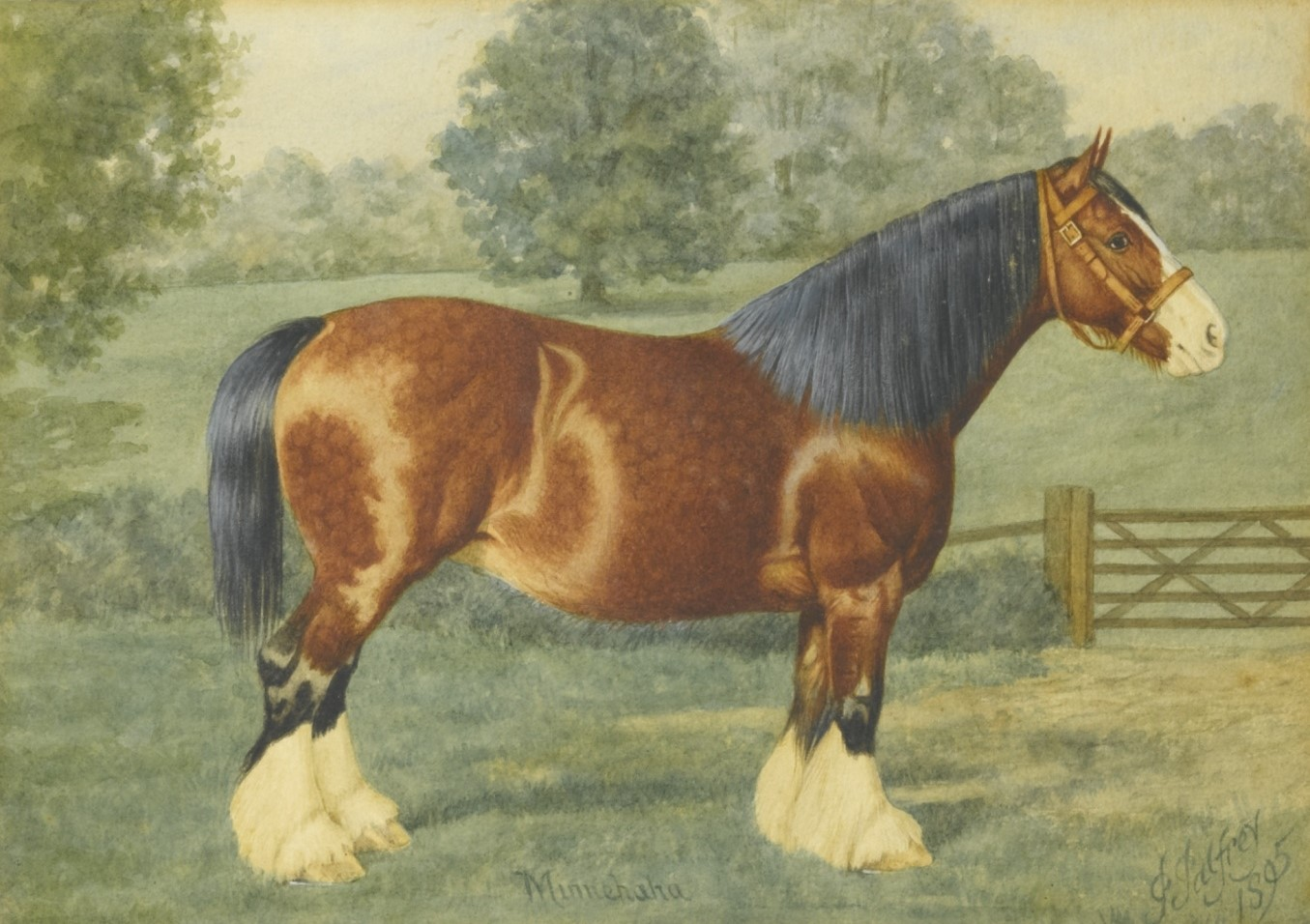
Minnehaha by Penry Powell Palfrey. Watercolour, 1895.

Penry Powell Palfrey (6 June 1830 – 22 August 1902) was a British stained glass designer and painter in watercolour of horses and coaching scenes.

== Early life ==
Penry Powell Palfrey was born in London on 6 June 1829. He was interested in horses and coaching from a very young age and made models of out of cardboard of the coaches that stopped in London. His father died when Penry was 16, making him the main provider for his mother and five siblings.

== Career ==
Around 1850, he obtained employment with Forsyth & Phyffers in Guilford Street, Russell Square. He soon after was allowed by his employer to work in the studio of John Richard Clayton in Albany Street, the founder in 1855 of the stained glass workshop Clayton and Bell. Palfrey soon became skilled in stained glass designs himself and produced many with his special interest of heraldic symbolism. He retained his interest in horses and coaching and painted those subjects in his spare time but did not practice in that area until later in life.

Palfrey later became a noted painter of horses and coaching scenes and his pictures of Derby winners were admired by Queen Victoria, King Edward VII and the Duke of Westminster.

== Family ==
His daughter was Margaret Agnes Palfrey (1870–1936), and his granddaughter was the illustrator Margaret Calkin James.

== Death and legacy ==
Palfrey died on 22 August 1902.
