= List of mayors of Slough =

This list of mayors of Slough starts with the first elected mayor, who was also the charter mayor named in the first Royal Charter when Slough became a Municipal Borough in 1938 (having previously been an Urban District).

Slough is a town in the South East England region of the United Kingdom. Until 1974, it was part of the Administrative county of Buckinghamshire and thereafter it was in the county of Berkshire. From 1998 it has been a unitary authority.

Since 1938, there has been a mayor of Slough elected at the annual meeting in every municipal year, by and from the members of the borough council.

The start of what was originally the 1947–48 municipal year was changed from November 1948 to May 1949, so that John Ernest Taylor's second term as mayor lasted for about 18 months.

In 1986, W.F. Back became the first mayor to die in office. Douglas Cyril Gibbs was elected to fill the vacancy for the remainder of the 1985-86 municipal year. He was re-elected for the 1986–87 municipal year.

In 2015, Shafiq Ahmed Chaudhry became the first mayor of Slough to resign during his term of office. For the remainder of the 2014–15 municipal year, the office of mayor was left vacant. Mohammed Rasib, the deputy mayor for 2014–15, presided over council meetings in that capacity until he was elected mayor for the 2015–16 municipal year.

== Municipal borough ==
Terms of the Mayors of the Municipal Borough of Slough.

No.	Elected	Name	Party	Ward	Notes
01.	9 November 1938	Edward Thomas Bowyer	Independent	Upton	Elected Alderman in 1938
02.	9 November 1939	Edward Thomas Bowyer	Independent	Alderman	
03.	9 November 1940	Aubrey Ernest Ward	Independent	Upton	Elected Alderman in 1941
04.	10 November 1941	Aubrey Ernest Ward	Independent	Alderman	
05.	9 November 1942	Aubrey Ernest Ward	Independent	Alderman	
06.	9 November 1943	Aubrey Ernest Ward	Independent	Alderman	
07.	9 November 1944	Aubrey Ernest Ward	Independent	Alderman	
08.	9 November 1945	Arthur John Frenchum	Labour	Stoke	First non-consecutive term
09.	9 November 1946	John Ernest Taylor	Independent	Alderman	
10.	10 November 1947	John Ernest Taylor	Independent	Alderman	Start of municipal year changed
11.	27 May 1949	John Ernest Taylor	Independent	Alderman	
12.	25 May 1950	Percy Lightfoot	Labour	Central North	Elected Alderman in 1950
13.	28 May 1951	Percy Lightfoot	Labour	Alderman	
14.	26 May 1952	William Henry Jennings	Conservative	Chalvey	
15.	20 May 1953	Reginald Charles Abbott	Labour	Alderman	
16.	26 May 1954	James Manning	Labour	Alderman	
17.	31 May 1955	Albert William John Pusey	Labour	Alderman	
18.	23 May 1956	Robert Taylor	Independent	Alderman	
19.	23 May 1957	Jeanie McKay Burns Gibson	Conservative	Chalvey	
20.	21 May 1958	Mary Jane Morgan	Labour	Alderman	
21.	25 May 1959	Doris Mary Smallbone	Liberal	Langley	
22.	24 May 1960	Ethel Eleanor Scott-Picton	Labour	Farnham South	
23.	25 May 1961	Noel Michael Eschle	Labour	Alderman	
24.	25 May 1962	Fred Sidney George Room	Labour	Alderman	
25.	24 May 1963	Arthur Simpson	Labour	Burnham South	
26.	22 May 1964	Winifred May Watson	Labour	Alderman	
27.	28 May 1965	Andrew Brand	Labour	Alderman	
28.	27 May 1966	Charles Alfred Penn	Labour	Burnham South	
29.	25 May 1967	Arthur John Frenchum	Labour	Alderman	Second non-consecutive term
30.	23 May 1968	John Rigby	Conservative	Alderman	
31.	22 May 1969	John Henry Patrick Laurence Goodman	Conservative	Alderman	
32.	21 May 1970	William Charles West	Conservative	Alderman	
33.	18 May 1971	Arnold James Bloom	Conservative	Alderman	
34.	27 May 1972	Norah Betty Denman	Conservative	Alderman	
35.	17 May 1973	Robert Frankl	Independent Labour	Farnham North	

== Borough ==
Terms of the Mayors of the Borough of Slough

No.	Elected	Name	Party	Ward	Notes
01.	1 April 1974	William John Park	Labour	Langley	
02.	20 May 1975	David Ronald Peters	Labour	Burnham South	
03.	25 May 1976	John Bernard McSweeney	Conservative	Central South	
04.	19 May 1977	George Brooker	Conservative	Langley	
05.	18 May 1978	John Antony Walker	Conservative	Chalvey	
06.	23 May 1979	M.H. Jones	Conservative	Upton	
07.	14 May 1980	Donald Fraser	Conservative	Burnham North	
08.	19 May 1981	Kenneth Small	Conservative	Burnham North	
09.	19 May 1982	Michael Greenland Long	Conservative	Upton	
10.	25 May 1983	Cyril Dawson Merrills	Labour	Central	
11.	17 May 1984	Lydia Emelda Simmons	Labour	Central	First black, female mayor in England
12.	22 May 1985	W.F. Back	Labour	Wexham Lea	Died in office
13.	29 April 1986	Douglas Cyril Gibbs	Labour	Britwell	Elected to fill vacancy
14.	28 May 1986	Douglas Cyril Gibbs	Labour	Britwell	
15.	28 May 1987	Robert W. Prosser	Labour	Wexham Lea	
16.	18 May 1988	Kartar Singh Parhar	Labour	Baylis	
17.	17 May 1989	Donald A. Hewitt	Labour	Farnham	
18.	23 May 1990	V.E. Hills	Labour	Chalvey	
19.	15 May 1991	Ravinder Chauhan	Labour	Farnham	
20.	21 May 1992	Dennis McCarthy	Labour	Britwell	
21.	19 May 1993	Sheila May Thorpe	Labour	Chalvey	
22.	19 May 1994	Ronald William Sibley	Labour	Central	
23.	18 May 1995	Mewa Singh Mann	Labour	Foxborough	
24.	21 May 1996	Maureen Atkinson	Labour	Kedermister	
25.	17 May 1997	Lakbir Singh Minhas	Labour	Baylis	
26.	14 May 1998	Gurbachan Singh Thind	Labour	Foxborough	
27.	20 May 1999	Olive Elsie M. Mansell	Labour	Stoke	
28.	18 May 2000	Ronald John Webb	Labour	Langley St Mary's	
29.	22 June 2001	Joan Jones	Labour	Kedermister	
30.	16 May 2002	Satpal Singh Parmar	Labour	Chalvey	
31.	15 May 2003	Laurence Leech Gleeson	Labour	Cippenham	
32.	24 June 2004	Julia Thomson Long	Conservative	Upton	
33.	19 May 2005	Mohammed Latif Khan	Independent	Wexham Lea	
34.	18 May 2006	David Ian MacIsaac	Independent	Wexham Lea	
35.	17 May 2007	Rashad Javaid Butt	Liberal Democrat	Baylis & Stoke	
36.	15 May 2008	Raja Mohammad Zarait	Labour	Chalvey	
37.	14 May 2009	Joginder Singh Bal	Labour	Farnham	
38.	20 May 2010	Jagjit Singh Grewal	Labour	Kedermister	
39.	19 May 2011	Sukhjit Kaur Dhaliwal	Labour	Farnham	
40.	17 May 2012	Christine Rita Small	Labour	Kedermister	
41.	16 May 2013	Balvinder Singh Bains	Labour	Upton	
42.	5 June 2014	Shafiq Ahmed Chaudhry	Labour	Central	Resigned 19 February 2015
43.	19 May 2015	Mohammed Rasib	Labour	Farnham	
44.	17 May 2016	Arvind Singh Dhaliwal	Labour	Elliman	
45.	18 May 2017	Ishrat Shah	Labour	Farnham	
46.	17 May 2018	Paul S Sohal	Labour	Wexham Lea	
47.	16 May 2019	Avtar Kaur Cheema	Labour	Colnbrook with Poyle	
48.	15 June 2020	Preston Brooker	Labour	Langley Kedermister	
49.	20 May 2021	Mohammed Nazir	Labour	Baylis and Stoke	
50.	19 May 2022	Dilbagh Singh Parmar			
51.	18 May 2023	Amjad Abbasi			
52.	16 May 2024	Balwinder Dhillon			
53.	15 May 2025	Siobhan Dauti			
54.	14 May 2026	Rifaqat Zarait			
