= 2023 Slough Borough Council election =

2023 UK local government election

- 4 May 2023

All 42 seats to Slough Borough Council 22 seats needed for a majority

	First party	Second party
Leader	Dexter Smith	James Swindlehurst
Party	Conservative	Labour
Leader's seat	Colnbrook and Poyle	Cippenham Green (lost seat)
Last election	6 seats, 30.3%	33 seats, 57.7%
Seats before	5	35
Seats won	21	18
Seat change	▲15	▼15
	Third party	Fourth party
Party	Liberal Democrats	Independent
Last election	0 seats, 6.2%	3 seats, 2.7%
Seats before	0	2
Seats won	3	0
Seat change	▲3	▼3
- Winner of each seat at the 2023 Slough Borough Council election
Leader before election
James Swindlehurst
Labour
Leader after election
Dexter Smith
Conservative
No overall control

The 2023 Slough Borough Council election took place on 4 May 2023 to elect members of Slough Borough Council in Berkshire, England. This was on the same day as other local elections in England.

Following a boundary review all 42 seats on the council were up for election and there was also a change to the electoral cycle for Slough. Previously a third of the council had been elected three years out of every four; from 2023 onwards the whole council would be elected together every four years.

The elections saw substantial gains by the Conservative Party against the national trend, more than quadrupling their number and ending up with exactly half the seats on the council.

== Overview ==
Prior to the election the council had a Labour majority. In 2021 the council had effectively declared bankruptcy and the government had appointed commissioners to oversee the authority's financial recovery. As a result, the council was one of only three in England to be given permission to increase council tax by more than 5% in 2023.

The election saw the Conservatives make significant gains at the expense of Labour, in contrast to the general trend across the country in 2023 where Labour generally made gains at the expense of the Conservatives. The Labour leader, James Swindlehurst, was one of those who lost his seat. The council was left under no overall control after the election, with the Conservatives winning 21 of the 42 seats. This was the only Labour-held council in the 2023 Local Elections that the party lost control of. The Conservatives subsequently formed an administration with support from the three Liberal Democrats. The Conservative group leader, Dexter Smith, was appointed leader of the council at the subsequent annual council meeting on 18 May 2023. Labour chose Pavitar Kaur Mann to be its new group leader in opposition.

== Summary ==
=== Election result ===
2023 Slough Borough Council election
Party	Candidates	Seats	Gains	Losses	Net gain/loss	Seats %	Votes %	Votes	+/−
Conservative	42	21	N/A	N/A	▲15	50.0	46.3	27,646	+16.0
Labour	42	18	N/A	N/A	▼15	42.9	42.8	25,507	–14.9
Liberal Democrats	8	3	N/A	N/A	▲3	7.1	4.5	2,712	–1.7
Independent	7	0	N/A	N/A	▼3	0.0	3.3	1,967	+0.6
Green	3	0	N/A	N/A	Steady	0.0	1.3	763	–0.7
Ind. Network	2	0	N/A	N/A	0	0.0	1.6	955	+1.0
Heritage	1	0	N/A	N/A	0	0.0	0.2	100	–0.3

== Ward results ==
The Statement of Persons Nominated, which details the candidates standing in each ward, was released by Slough Borough Council following the close of nominations on 5 April 2023.

=== Baylis & Salt Hill ===
Baylis & Salt Hill (2 seats)
Party	Candidate	Votes	%	±%
Labour Co-op	Fiza Matloob*	1,247	71.1	
Labour Co-op	Maroof Mohammad*	1,070	61.0	
Conservative	Surinder Chaggar	535	30.5	
Conservative	Mohammed Hussaini	468	26.7	
Majority				
Turnout		1,755	35.42	
Labour Co-op win (new seat)				
Labour Co-op win (new seat)				

=== Britwell ===
Britwell (2 seats)
Party	Candidate	Votes	%	±%
Labour Co-op	Robert Anderson*	685	52.4	
Labour Co-op	Pavitar Mann*	612	46.8	
Conservative	Dennis French	502	38.4	
Conservative	Ashish Mishra	467	35.7	
Independent	Ollie Isernia	206	15.8	
Majority				
Turnout		1,307	26.19	
Labour Co-op win (new seat)				
Labour Co-op win (new seat)				

=== Chalvey ===
Chalvey (2 seats)
Party	Candidate	Votes	%	±%
Conservative	Rifaqat Zarait	707	56.7	
Conservative	Zafar Satti	674	54.0	
Labour Co-op	Mohammad Sandhu*	538	43.1	
Labour Co-op	Shahida Akbar*	531	42.5	
Majority				
Turnout		1,248	32.92	
Conservative win (new seat)				
Conservative win (new seat)				

=== Cippenham Green ===
Cippenham Green (2 seats)
Party	Candidate	Votes	%	±%
Conservative	Ishrat Shah	911	49.2	
Conservative	Robert Stedmond	895	48.4	
Labour Co-op	Jemma Davis*	581	31.4	
Labour Co-op	James Swindlehurst*	478	25.8	
Independent	Wayne Strutton	275	14.9	
Liberal Democrats	Gurmail Hothi	198	10.7	
Heritage	Nick Smith	100	5.4	
Majority				
Turnout		1,850	36.47	
Conservative win (new seat)				
Conservative win (new seat)				

=== Cippenham Manor ===
Cippenham Manor (2 seats)
Party	Candidate	Votes	%	±%
Conservative	Nadeem Khawar	663	43.2	
Labour Co-op	Dilbagh Parmar*	663	43.2	
Labour Co-op	Ruqayah Begum*	635	41.4	
Conservative	Ahmar Usmani	583	38.0	
Liberal Democrats	Manjit Singh	307	20.0	
Majority				
Turnout		1,533	29.52	
Conservative win (new seat)				
Labour win (new seat)				

=== Cippenham Village ===
Cippenham Village (2 seats)
Party	Candidate	Votes	%	±%
Labour	Bally Gill*	469	30.9	
Liberal Democrats	Frank O'Kelly	420	27.6	
Liberal Democrats	Matthew Taylor	405	26.6	
Conservative	Haaris Ahmad	394	25.9	
Labour	Josh Kimani	394	25.9	
Conservative	Yasmin Raja	389	25.6	
Green	Shah Khairul Enam	378	24.9	
Majority				
Turnout		1,520	30.58	
Labour win (new seat)				
Liberal Democrats win (new seat)				

=== Colnbrook & Poyle ===
Colnbrook & Poyle (2 seats)
Party	Candidate	Votes	%	±%
Conservative	Dexter Smith*	701	46.5	
Conservative	Puja Bedi*	679	45.0	
Labour	Avtar Cheema	615	40.8	
Labour	Gurchetan Hayer	408	27.0	
Independent	Joyce John	310	20.5	
Majority				
Turnout		1,509	30.09	
Conservative win (new seat)				
Conservative win (new seat)				

=== Elliman ===
Elliman (2 seats)
Party	Candidate	Votes	%	±%
Liberal Democrats	Amjad Abbasi	534	49.7	
Liberal Democrats	Asim Naveed	460	42.8	
Labour	Mushtaq Malik*	388	36.1	
Labour	Nuzhat Nematali	344	32.0	
Conservative	Ravinder Bhakar	187	17.4	
Conservative	Aakash Singh	187	17.4	
Majority				
Turnout		1,074	29.66	
Liberal Democrats win (new seat)				
Liberal Democrats win (new seat)				

=== Farnham ===
Farnham (2 seats)
Party	Candidate	Votes	%	±%
Labour Co-op	Sabia Akram*	560	53.2	
Labour Co-op	Waqas Sabah	546	51.9	
Conservative	Arshad Hussain	491	46.6	
Conservative	Dawinderpal Sahota	490	46.5	
Majority				
Turnout		1,053	23.87	
Labour Co-op win (new seat)				
Labour Co-op win (new seat)				

=== Haymill ===
Haymill (2 seats)
Party	Candidate	Votes	%	±%
Conservative	Anna Wright	809	55.4	
Conservative	Paul Kelly	803	55.0	
Labour	Sanna Malik*	457	31.3	
Labour	Satpal Parmar*	424	29.1	
Liberal Democrats	Catharine Parkes	252	17.3	
Majority				
Turnout		1,459	29.0	
Conservative win (new seat)				
Conservative win (new seat)				

=== Herschel Park ===
Herschel Park (2 seats)
Party	Candidate	Votes	%	±%
Labour	Christine Hulme*	650	55.3	
Labour	Zaffar Ajaib*	612	52.1	
Conservative	Tom King	513	43.7	
Conservative	Rikky Lobo	423	36.0	
Majority				
Turnout		1,175	23.66	
Labour win (new seat)				
Labour win (new seat)				

=== Langley Foxborough ===
Langley Foxborough (2 seats)
Party	Candidate	Votes	%	±%
Labour	Naveeda Qaseem*	557	41.7	
Labour	Mark Instone	525	39.3	
Ind. Network	Sunil Sudhakaran	481	36.0	
Conservative	Sharon Gillingwater	393	29.4	
Conservative	Jibril Hassan	284	21.2	
Green	Petra Rau	178	13.3	
Majority				
Turnout		1,337	29.95	
Labour win (new seat)				
Labour win (new seat)				

=== Langley Marish ===
Langley Marish (2 seats)
Party	Candidate	Votes	%	±%
Conservative	Chandra Muvvala	1,114	56.7	
Conservative	Wal Chahal	807	41.0	
Labour Co-op	Kuljit Kaur	505	25.7	
Labour Co-op	Preston Brooker*	491	25.0	
Independent	Ansar Mohammed	263	13.4	
Independent	Sharon O'Reilly	245	12.5	
Liberal Democrats	Josephine Hanney	136	6.9	
Majority				
Turnout		1,966	40.48	
Registered electors				
Conservative win (new seat)				
Conservative win (new seat)				

=== Langley Meads ===
Langley Meads (2 seats)
Party	Candidate	Votes	%	±%
Conservative	Neel Rana	904	62.3	
Conservative	Mabu Shaik	824	56.8	
Labour	Kamaljit Kaur*	542	37.4	
Labour	Satish Basra	505	34.8	
Majority				
Turnout		1,451	31.06	
Registered electors				
Conservative win (new seat)				
Conservative win (new seat)				

=== Langley St Mary's ===
Langley St Mary's (2 seats)
Party	Candidate	Votes	%	±%
Conservative	Gurcharan Manku	783	44.9	
Conservative	Adil Iftakhar	727	41.7	
Labour	Gurdeep Grewal*	563	32.3	
Labour	Savneet Bains	535	30.7	
Ind. Network	Shin Dhother	474	27.2	
Green	Julian Edmonds	207	11.9	
Majority				
Turnout		1,744	38.12	
Conservative win (new seat)				
Conservative win (new seat)				

=== Manor Park & Stoke ===
Manor Park & Stoke (2 seats)
Party	Candidate	Votes	%	±%
Labour	Mohammed Nazir*	913	52.4	
Labour	Jamila Sabah	832	47.7	
Conservative	Sarfraz Khan	805	46.2	
Conservative	Sajid Janjua	742	42.5	
Majority				
Turnout		1,744	32.34	
Labour win (new seat)				
Labour win (new seat)				

=== Northborough & Lynch Hill Valley ===
Northborough & Lynch Hill Valley (2 seats)
Party	Candidate	Votes	%	±%
Labour	Martin Carter*	580	49.6	
Conservative	Siobhan Dauti	537	45.9	
Labour	Annetta Dendie	512	43.8	
Conservative	Steven Gillingwater	512	43.8	
Majority				
Turnout		1,169	25.89	
Labour win (new seat)				
Conservative win (new seat)				

=== Slough Central ===
Slough Central (2 seats)
Party	Candidate	Votes	%	±%
Conservative	Ejaz Ahmed	547	53.3	
Conservative	Dhruv Tomar	539	52.5	
Labour	Safdar Ali*	447	43.5	
Labour	Katarzyna Rusin	416	40.5	
Majority				
Turnout		1,027	28.24	
Conservative win (new seat)				
Conservative win (new seat)				

=== Upton ===
Upton (2 seats)
Party	Candidate	Votes	%	±%
Conservative	Balwinder Dhillon	1,277	65.9	
Conservative	Subhash Mohindra	1,220	62.9	
Labour	Balvinder Bains*	603	31.1	
Labour	Jina Basra*	545	28.1	
Majority				
Turnout		1,939	38.96	
Conservative win (new seat)				
Conservative win (new seat)				

=== Upton Lea ===
Upton Lea (2 seats)
Party	Candidate	Votes	%	±%
Labour Co-op	Haqeeq Dar*	1,105	56.6	
Labour Co-op	Andrea Escott	957	49.0	
Conservative	Raja Fayyaz	856	43.9	
Conservative	Arvind Dhaliwal	842	43.1	
Majority				
Turnout			36.19	
Labour Co-op win (new seat)				
Labour Co-op win (new seat)				

=== Wexham Court ===
Wexham Court (2 seats)
Party	Candidate	Votes	%	±%
Labour	Harjinder Gahir*	826	43.8	
Conservative	Iftakhar Ahmed	815	43.2	
Conservative	Hardeep Jandu	647	34.3	
Labour	Gaye Jeynes	641	34.0	
Independent	Mubashir Ahmed	539	28.5	
Independent	Patrick Donachy	129	6.8	
Majority				
Turnout		1,888	38.71	
Labour win (new seat)				
Conservative win (new seat)				

== Changes 2023–2027 ==
Seven councillors elected for Labour (Zaffar Ajab, Sabia Akram, Haqeeq Dar, Mohammed Nazir, Naveeda Qaseem, Waqas Sabah and Jamilia Sabah) left the party in June 2024, initially sitting as a new independent group. The seven subsequently joined the Liberal Democrats in April 2025.

Chandra Muvvala, elected as a Conservative, left the party in June 2024, becoming an independent.

=== Cippenham Green ===
Cippenham Green by-election, 11 June 2026
Party	Candidate	Votes	%	±%
Green	Chloe Hart	409	24.5%	+24.5
Conservative	Raja Muhammad Fayyaz	404	24.2%	–25.0
Labour Co-op	Preston Brooker	355	21.3%	–10.1
Reform	Christina Mahboob	326	19.5%	+19.5
Liberal Democrats	Jennifer Claire Simpson	176	10.5%	–0.2
Majority		5	0.3%	
Invalid or blank votes		8	0.5%	
Turnout		1,670	32.13	
Green gain from Conservative				
