= Slough Borough Council =

Local authority in England

Type
- Type: Unitary authority

Leadership
- Mayor: Rifaqat Zarait, Conservative since 14 May 2026
- Leader: Wal Chahal, Conservative since 14 May 2026
- Chief Executive (interim): Will Tuckley since 15 April 2024 (Note: Additionally serving as 'Managing Director Commissioner' from 20 November 2024.)

Structure
- Seats: 42 councillors
- Political groups: Administration (19) Conservative (19) Other parties (23) Labour (11) Liberal Democrats (10) Green (1) Independent (1)
- Length of term: Whole council elected every four years

Elections
- Voting system: Plurality-at-large
- Last election: 4 May 2023
- Next election: 6 May 2027

Meeting place
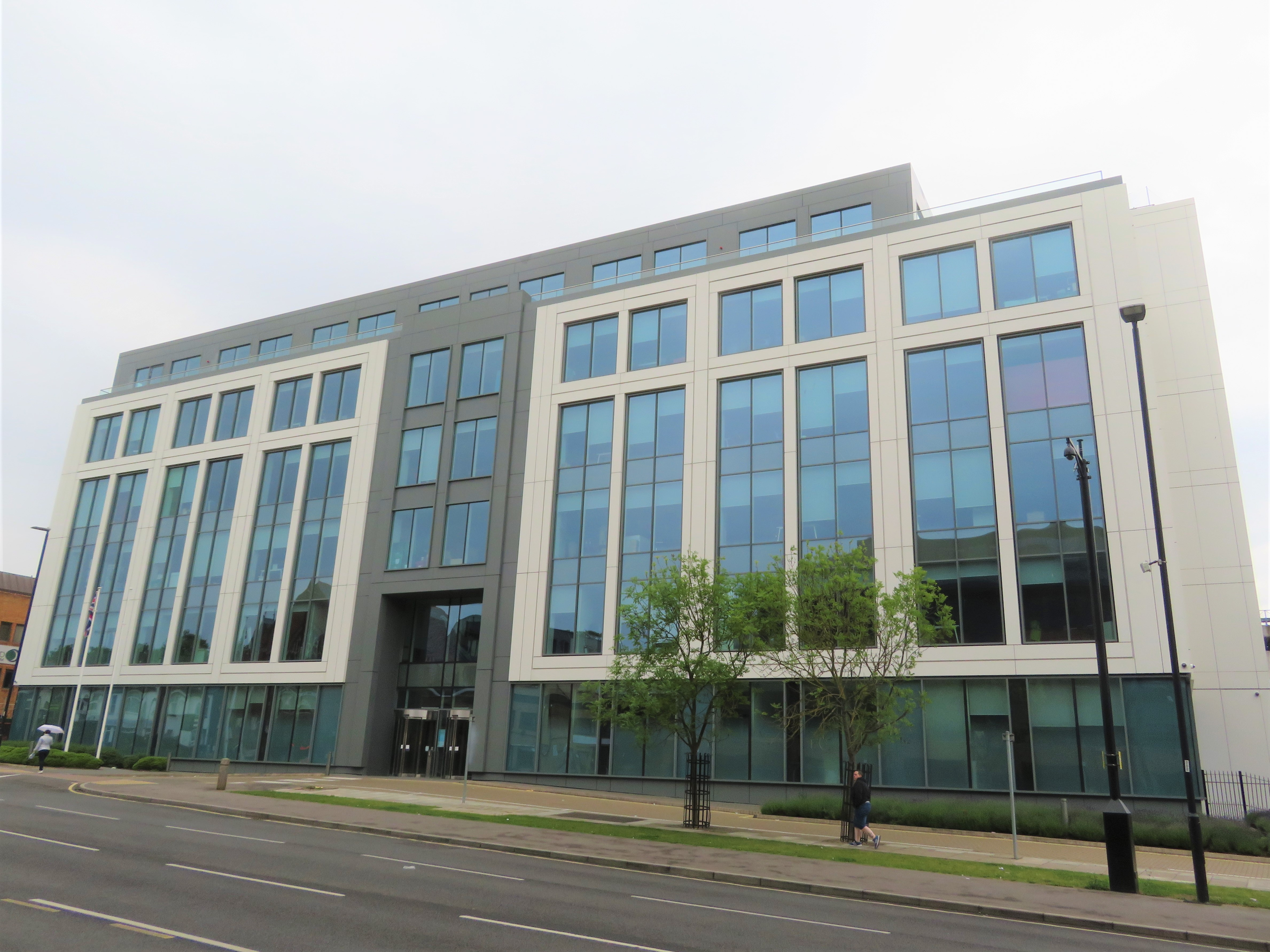
- Observatory House, 25 Winsdor Road, Slough, SL1 2EL

Website
- www.slough.gov.uk

Slough Borough Council is the local authority for the Borough of Slough in Berkshire, England. Slough has had an elected council since 1863, which has been reformed several times. Since 1998 the council has been a unitary authority, being a district council which also performs the functions of a county council.

The council has been under no overall control since 2023, being led by a Conservative minority administration. It is based at Observatory House in the town centre.

== History ==
Slough's first local authority was a local board, established in 1863. Such boards were reconstituted as urban district councils in 1894. The urban district boundaries were enlarged several times, notably in 1930 when it absorbed areas including Langley and Cippenham.

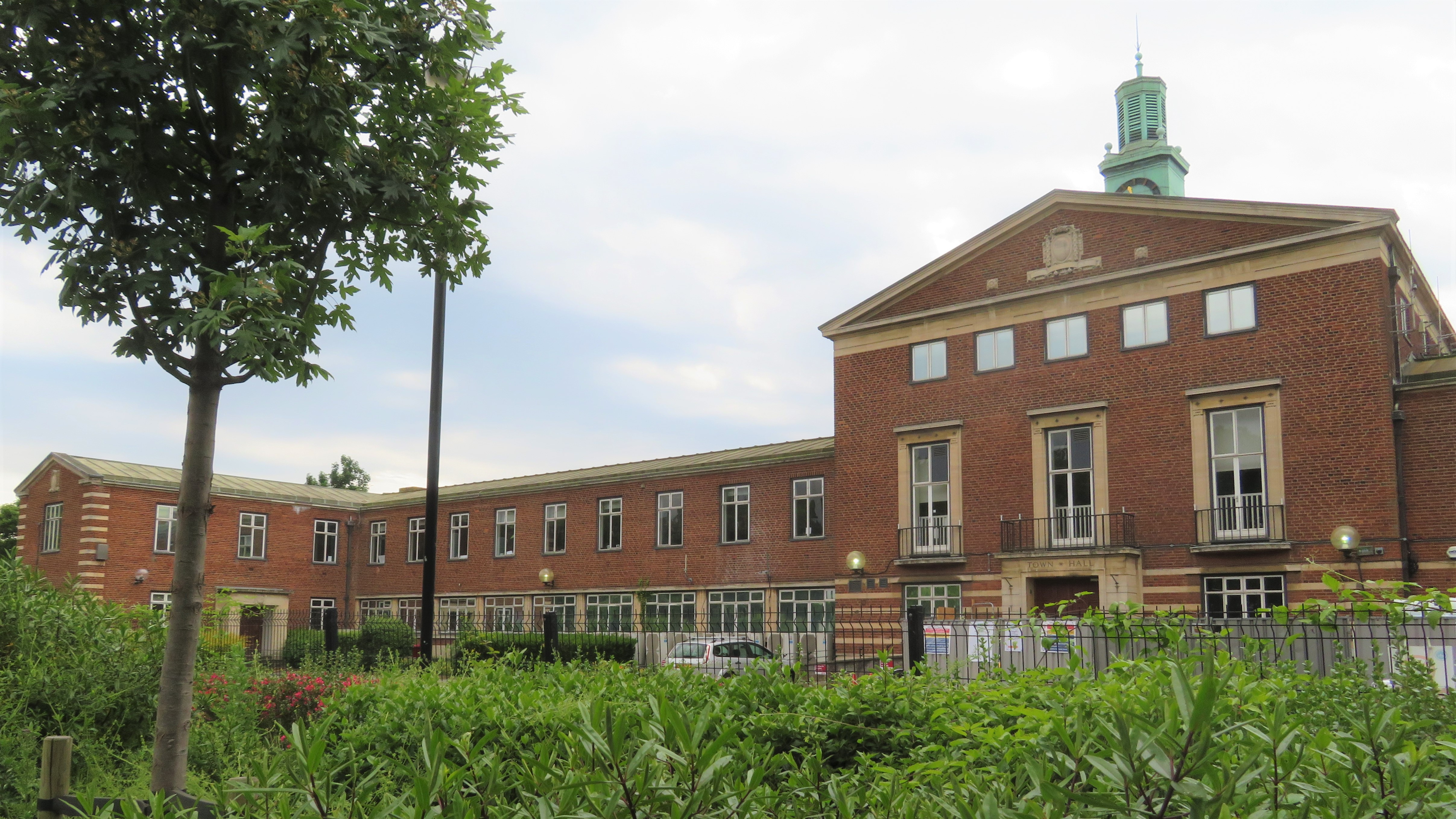
Slough Town Hall, Bath Road: Council's headquarters 1937–2011

In 1938 the urban district was incorporated to become a municipal borough. It was then governed by a body formally called the 'mayor, aldermen and burgesses of the borough of Slough', generally known as the corporation, town council or borough council.

The municipal borough was abolished in 1974 under the Local Government Act 1972. It was replaced by a slightly larger non-metropolitan district of Slough, which covered the old borough plus the Britwell and Wexham Court areas, and was transferred from Buckinghamshire to Berkshire. Slough's borough status was transferred to the new district, allowing the chair of the council to take the title of mayor, continuing Slough's series of mayors dating back to 1938.

From 1974 until 1998, Slough Borough Council was a lower-tier authority, with Berkshire County Council providing county-level services in the borough. The borough was enlarged in 1995 to take in Colnbrook with Poyle.

Berkshire County Council was abolished in 1998. Slough Borough Council then became a unitary authority, taking over the former county council's functions in the borough.

== Governance ==
As a unitary authority, Slough Borough Council provides both district-level and county-level functions. There are three civil parishes in the borough at Britwell, Colnbrook with Poyle, and Wexham Court, which form an additional tier of local government for their area. The rest of the borough is unparished.

=== Political control ===
Since the 2023 election the council has been under no overall control, being led by the Conservatives with support from the Liberal Democrats.

Political control of the council since the 1974 reforms has been as follows:

Lower-tier non-metropolitan district

Party in control	Years
Labour	1974–1976
Conservative	1976–1983
Labour	1983–1998

Unitary authority

Party in control	Years
Labour	1998–2004
No overall control	2004–2008
Labour	2008–2023
No overall control	2023–present

=== Leadership ===
The role of Mayor of Slough is largely ceremonial. Political leadership is instead provided by the leader of the council. The leaders since 2001 have been:

Councillor	Party	From	To
John Connolly	Labour		Jun 2001
Rob Anderson	Labour	Jun 2001	Jun 2004
Richard Stokes	Liberal	6 Jul 2004	May 2008
Rob Anderson	Labour	15 May 2008	6 Jun 2016
Sohail Munawar	Labour	6 Jun 2016	28 Nov 2017
James Swindlehurst	Labour	28 Nov 2017	May 2023
Dexter Smith	Conservative	18 May 2023	May 2026
Wal Chahal	Conservative	14 May 2026	

=== Composition ===
Following the 2023 election and subsequent changes of allegiance and a by-election up to June 2026, the composition of the council is:

Party	Councillors
Conservative	19
Labour	11
Liberal Democrats	10
Green	1
Independent	1
Total	42

The next election is due in May 2027.

== Bankruptcy (2021) ==
On 2 July 2021, Slough Borough Council issued a notice under Section 114 of the Local Government Finance Act 1988, having the effect of preventing any new expenditure on non-statutory services, after serious financial problems had been identified. In October 2021, the government announced plans to appoint external commissioners to help run the council after a series of reports highlighted major problems at the local authority.

== Elections ==
Since the last boundary changes in 2023, the council has comprised 42 councillors representing 21 wards, with each ward electing two councillors. Elections are held every four years.

== Premises ==
The council is based at Observatory House at 25 Windsor Road in the town centre. It was built in the 1990s as commercial offices. The council bought the building in July 2018 for a reported £41.3 million and converted it to become their offices and meeting place, with the first council meetings in the building being held in September 2019.

The council was previously based at Slough Town Hall at 19 Bath Road, which was built in 1937 and served as the council's headquarters until 2011. The council was then temporarily based at St Martin's Place at 51 Bath Road from 2011 to 2019, holding meetings at various venues in the town whilst looking for a new home closer to the town centre. In February 2025, the Council announced it was putting the St Martin's Place office complex up for sale.
