= City Hall, Norwich =

Municipal building in Norwich, Norfolk, England

Coordinates: 52.6286°N 1.2917°E

City Hall
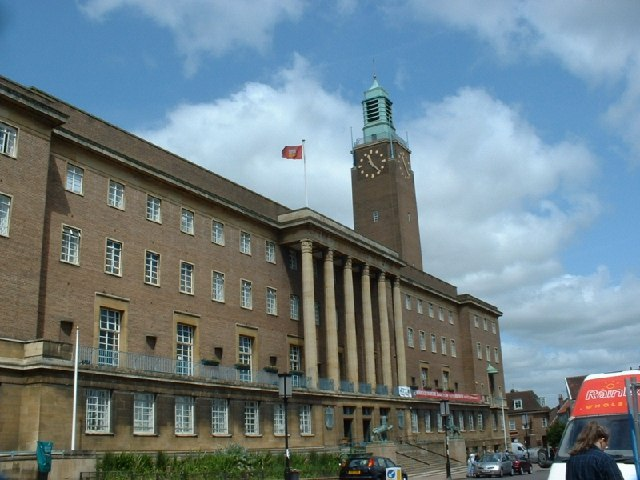
- View of City Hall from St. Peter's Street
- Interactive map of the City Hall area

General information
- Type: City hall
- Architectural style: Art Deco
- Location: Norwich, Norfolk, England, City Hall, St. Peter's Street, Norwich, NR2 1NH
- Current tenants: Norwich City Council
- Completed: 1938

Height
- Height: 56.4 m (185 ft)

Design and construction
- Architects: Charles Holloway James, Stephen Rowland Pierce

Website
- www.norwich.gov.uk

Listed Building – Grade II*
- Official name: City Hall including Police Station
- Designated: 29 January 1971
- Reference no.: 1210484

Norwich City Hall is an Art Deco building completed in 1938 which houses the city hall for the city of Norwich in Norfolk, England. It is one of the Norwich 12, a collection of twelve heritage buildings in Norwich deemed of particular historical and cultural importance. It was designated as a Grade II* listed building in 1971.

== History ==
The new City Hall saw the demolition in Norwich of Tudor, Regency and Victorian buildings on St Peters Street and the Market Place, including many yards and dilapidated municipal buildings. The architects Charles Holloway James and Stephen Rowland Pierce designed the building after Robert Atkinson had prepared a layout for the whole Civic Centre site at the request of the then Norwich Corporation (the then county borough reconstituted in 1974 as the City Council). A competition took place in 1931 which attracted 143 entries, with Atkinson as the sole judge. After the winning design was chosen the Depression and a protracted planning process delayed the start of the building, and the foundation stone was not laid until 1936. Norwich City Hall was officially opened by King George VI and Queen Elizabeth on 29 October 1938.

The Bethel Street police station, headquarters of the Norwich Constabulary then latter the Norfolk Constabulary, lies on the southern side including a 1960s addition.

== Architecture ==
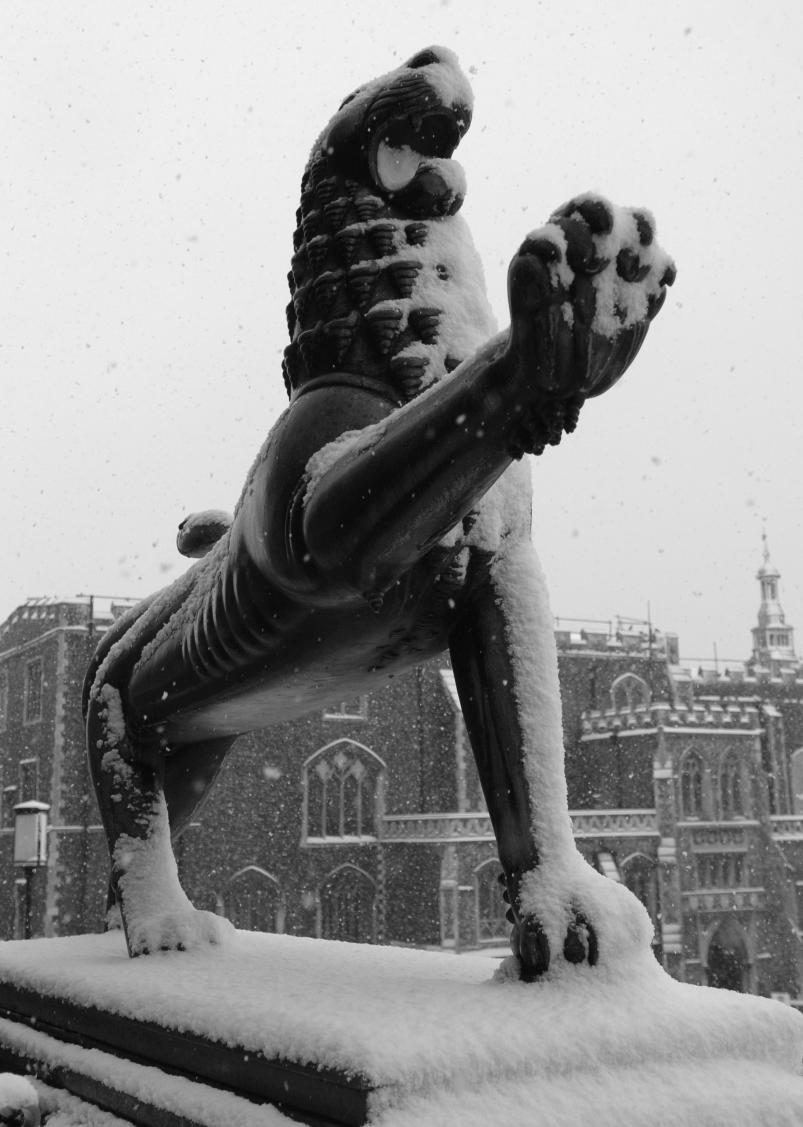
One of the two heraldic lions which flank the entrance, sculpted by Alfred Hardiman.

The architects designed for Norwich an Art Deco public building of national significance. It was built to the highest standards, using superior materials and methods of its day. Even the bricks were specially made, each one being two inches longer than usual to better reflect the proportions of the finished building. Charles Holloway James and Stephen Rowland Pierce engaged Alfred Hardiman as their consultant sculptor. He contributed the iconic lions passant which guard the building, and three figures of Recreation, Wisdom and Education outside the Council Chamber. His colleague James Woodford designed the six main bronze doors, incorporating 18 roundels showing the history and industry of Norwich. Eric Aumonier carved the city arms above the Regalia Room window on Bethel Street, and Margaret Calkin James provided textiles for some of the important rooms.

The materials used include Italian marble and English stone, Honduras mahogany and Australian walnut. Seating is upholstered in Moroccan leather, and rooms panelled in elm, oak, teak and birch. The Lord Mayor's octagonal parlour is panelled in sycamore with French walnut trim, with the door finished in English walnut. The main frontage of the building is 280 ft (85 m) long, incorporating a 200 ft (61 m) balcony. The city council claims that the balcony is the longest such structure in the UK. Meanwhile, the bell in the clock tower has the deepest tone in East Anglia; it, together with the clock, was manufactured by Gillett & Johnston of Croydon.

== See also ==
- Norwich Market
