= Charles Holloway James =

English architect (1893–1953)

Charles Holloway James RA FRIBA
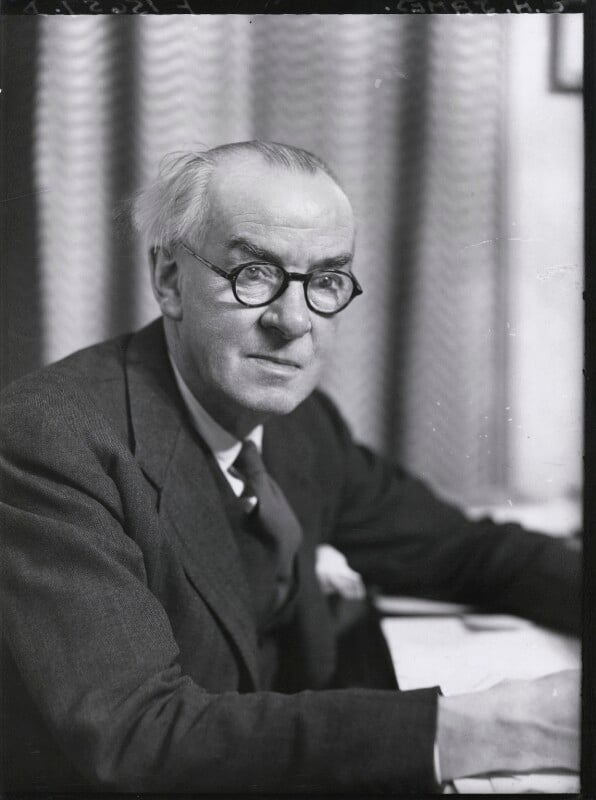
- James in 1952
- Born: 1893; Gloucester, England
- Died: 1953 (aged 59–60)

Charles Holloway James, RA FRIBA, (1893–1953), architect, specialised in designs for homes and housing projects, but also completed large public works, particularly in collaboration with Stephen Rowland Pierce.

== Early life ==
James was born in 1893 at Gloucester and attended Sir Thomas Rich’s school. Articled to Walter Bryan Wood, he later assisted Sir Edwin Lutyens and then Barry Parker and Raymond Unwin, consulting architects to the First Garden City, Letchworth, arousing his interest in housing design.

== Career ==
Returning from the war of 1914-18, where he lost a leg, James went into partnership with Charles Murray Hennell in 1919, full of enthusiasm for the ideals of a new social order. He lectured on “Housing and Site Planning,” at the Architectural Association in 1921-22, and published a book Small Houses for the Community with photographs by F. R. Yerbury, in 1924.

Both Hennell and James had worked at Letchworth, and much of their early work together was at Welwyn Garden City. They were also responsible for Swanpool Garden Suburb, Lincoln; government subsidy houses in Thorpe Bay, Essex; and the layout and design of housing schemes in other parts of the country. After Hennell's death much of James's work was done at Hampstead Garden Suburb, including his own house and several on a larger scale.

James won competitions for three public buildings. Of these the most important was the City Hall, Norwich, on an elevated site between the ancient Guildhall and the Church of St. Peter Mancroft above the market place. A building on a grand scale, it combines James's neo-Georgian architecture with a reference to the then fashionable Swedish movement and the tower of Stockholm City Hall at Ostberg.

Norwich City Hall is the most important of the public buildings designed by James, in collaboration with S Rowland Pierce, and other municipal projects in which James was involved included County Hall, Hertford (1939) and Slough Town Hall (1937).

James, active despite his war injury, was described as a tall man with soft, flexible, and rather boyish features, giving the impression of great sensibility. He had a good deal of quiet humour, affecting a robust attitude to life that contrasted with his appearance. He became ARIBA in 1918 and FRIBA in 1926, and served as RIBA vice president 1947-8. He was elected ARA in 1937 and RA in 1946. He won the London Architecture bronze medal in 1949 and Housing Medal of the Ministry of Housing and Local Government in 1951.

He married the designer Margaret Calkin James in 1922.
