= Earl Haig Memorial =

Equestrian statue in London by Alfred Frank Hardiman

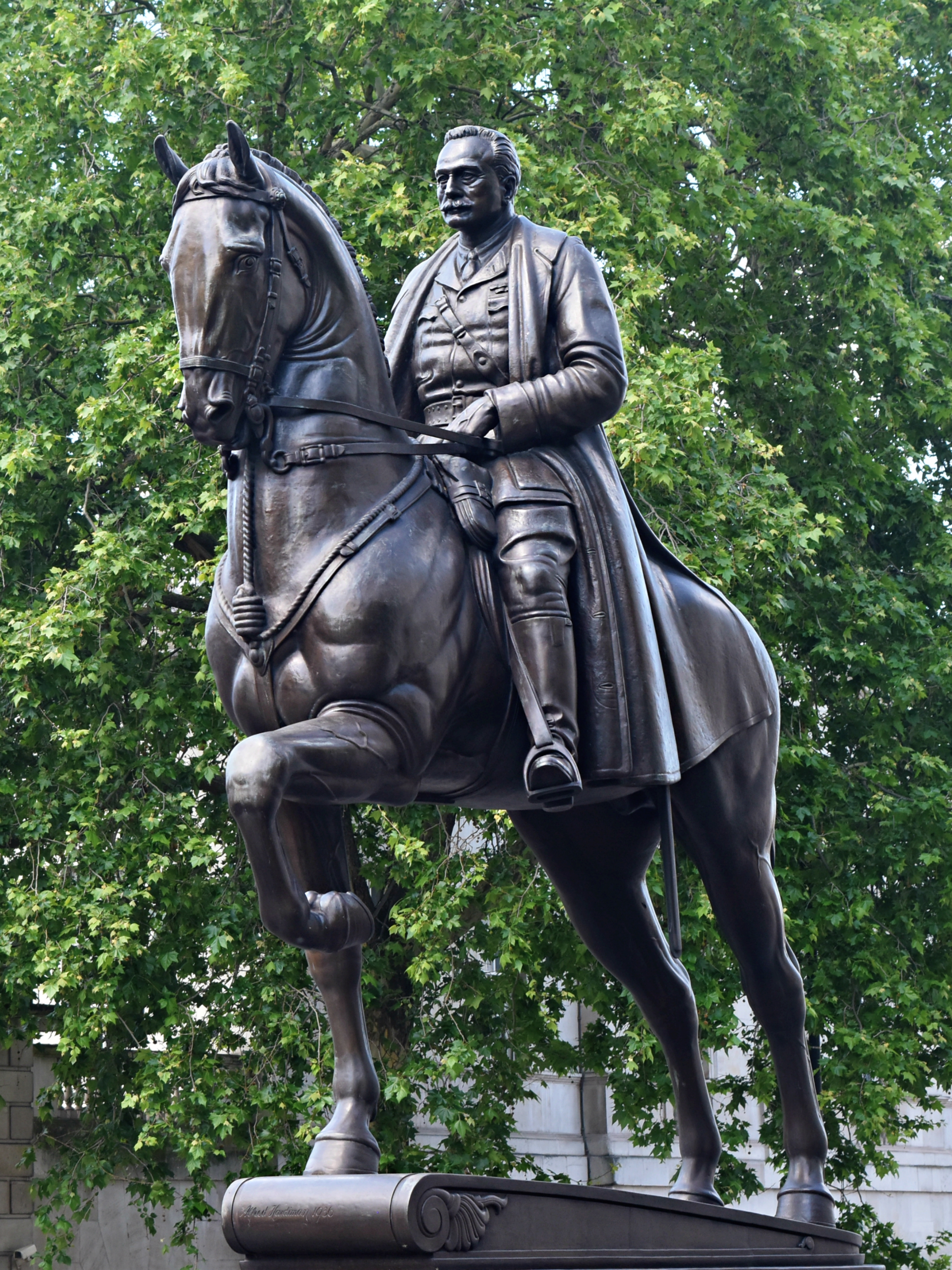
- The Earl Haig Memorial
- Artist: Alfred Frank Hardiman
- Medium: Bronze
- Subject: Douglas Haig, 1st Earl Haig
- Location: Whitehall; Westminster, London; 51.50426°N 0.12631°W

Listed Building – Grade II*
- Official name: Statue of Field Marshal Earl Haig
- Designated: 9 July 2014
- Reference no.: 1066109

The Earl Haig Memorial is a bronze equestrian statue of the British Western Front commander Douglas Haig, 1st Earl Haig on Whitehall in central London. It was created by the sculptor Alfred Frank Hardiman and commissioned by Parliament in 1928. Eight years in the making, it aroused considerable controversy; the Field Marshal's riding position, his uniform, the horse's anatomy and its stance all drew harsh criticism. The inscription on the plinth reads "Field Marshal Earl Haig Commander-in-Chief of the British Armies in France 1915–1918".

== History ==
Hardiman had won the commission in competition with his fellow sculptors Gilbert Ledward and William Macmillan. His winning model showed Haig riding a classical charger befitting a hero, derived from Hardiman's studies of renaissance equestrian sculpture. The Press and Lady Haig weighed in, asking why Earl Haig could not be portrayed with realism riding his own horse, Poperinghe. Eventually Hardiman was asked to produce a second model, but in trying to accommodate his critics the sculptor produced a compromise that pleased no-one. The design went back to Cabinet and they were persuaded to allow the sculptor a free hand in executing the full-sized statue; George Lansbury wrote: "I feel confident that if your genius is unfettered you will give us a memorial worthy of the Field Marshal, the nation and yourself". The memorial was unveiled by Prince Henry, Duke of Gloucester on 10 November 1937, with King George VI laying a wreath at the base the following day, Armistice Day.

The memorial has received some support in recent years but has also found itself the target of criticism. In the run-up to Remembrance Day 1998 the Daily Express attacked the memorial on its front page, asking "Why do we let this man cast a shadow over our war dead?". On 4 June 2020, protesters shouted abuse at soldiers from the Household Cavalry whilst scrubbing A.C.A.B. graffiti from the memorial, following a Black Lives Matter protest.

== See also ==
- Grade II* listed war memorials in England
