= Alfred Frank Hardiman =

English sculptor

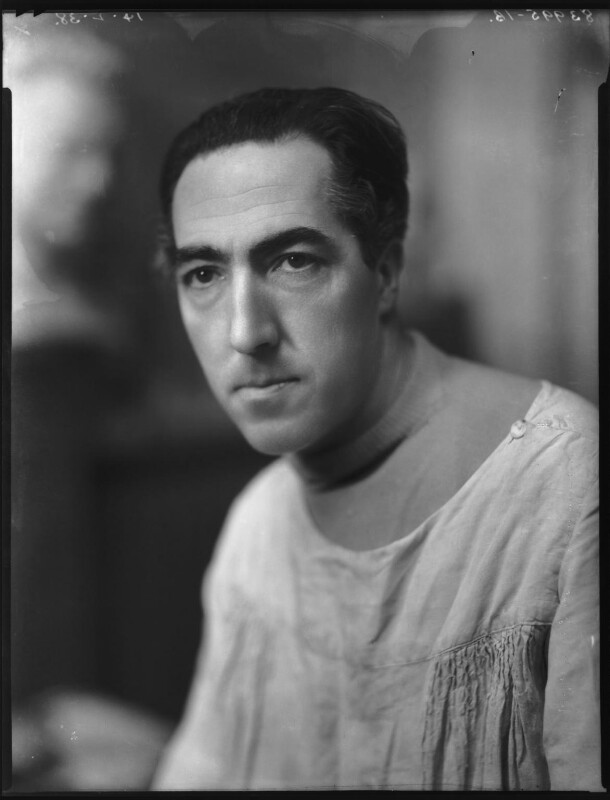
Hardiman in 1938

Alfred Frank Hardiman RA (21 May 1891 – 17 April 1949) was an English sculptor. He was born at 17 Orde Hall Street, London, the son of Alfred William Hardiman, silversmith, of Holborn, and his wife, Ada Myhill.

== Life ==
Hardiman won a London County Council Scholarship to the Royal College of Art in 1912, and three years later joined the Royal Academy School. After a period as an engineer's draughtsman in the Royal Flying Corps during the First World War, Hardiman resumed his studies and in 1920 was awarded the British Prix de Rome scholarship, spending two years at the British School at Rome. There he developed his style, a blend of naturalism and classicism influenced by Roman and Etruscan art and early fifth century Greek sculpture.

Hardiman's best-known (but also most controversial) work is the Earl Haig Memorial on Whitehall in London. More universally admired are the heraldic lions flanking the main entrance to the City Hall, Norwich, a work which fully epitomises his style. He was appointed consultant sculptor to the building, having worked with one of the architects, Stephen Rowland Pierce, on the Haig Memorial. Hardiman also carved three large stone figures for the outside of the council chamber, and worked with other sculptors on the project including James Woodford and Eric Aumonier.

Hardiman was elected Associate of the Royal Academy in 1936 and a full Academician in 1944. He became a fellow of the Royal Society of British Sculptors in 1938 and the following year received their silver medal for his statue of Haig. In 1946 he won a gold medal for his bronze fountain figure for the New Council House, College Green, Bristol, which however was never erected.

In 1918 he married Violet, daughter of Herbert Clifton White, of London, and had two daughters. He died at Stoke Poges 17 April 1949, aged 57.

== Public sculptures ==
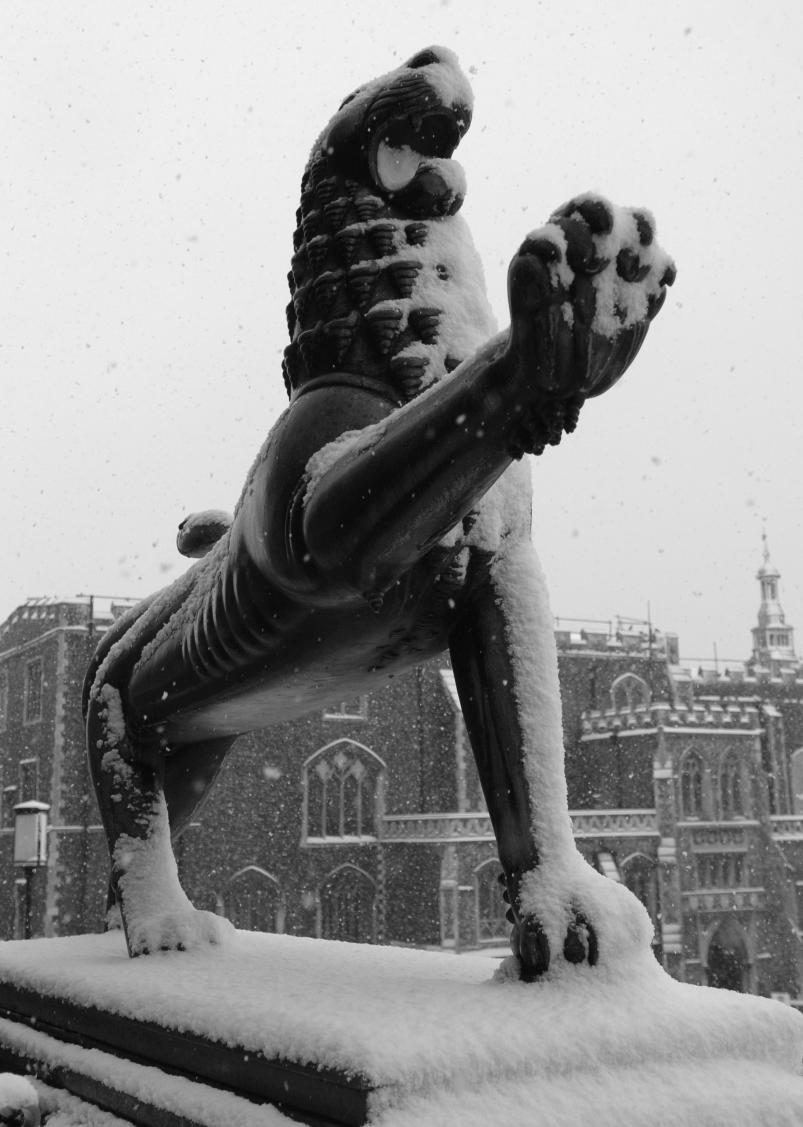
Alfred Hardiman heraldic lion, Norwich City Hall, 1938

- Whitehall, London: Earl Haig Memorial
- County Hall, London: Four statue groups
- St James's Church, Piccadilly, London: Memorial fountain to Viscount Southwood
- Eltham Palace, London: Saint George (originally at Carlos Place)
- City Hall, Norwich: Two bronze heraldic lions, three statues: Recreation, Wisdom, Education
- Old St Paul's, Edinburgh: Crucifixion at the head of the Calvary Stair
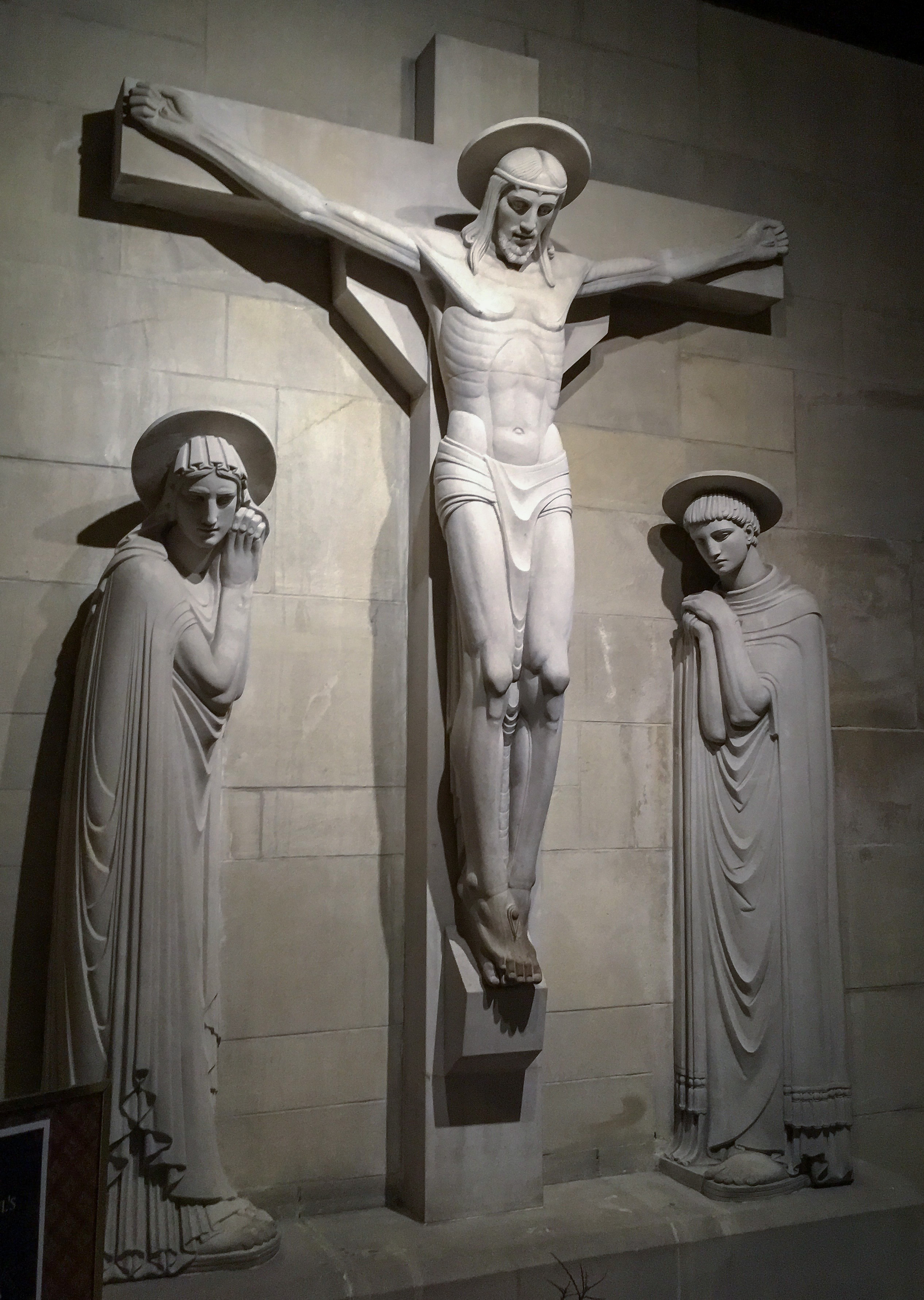
  Alfred Hardiman, Calvary, Old St Paul's, Edinburgh, 1926
- Bantaskine, Falkirk: Peace
- Kippen Kirk, Stirling: Entry into Jerusalem
- Rhodes House, Oxford: Portrait of Cecil Rhodes
- Hertfordshire County Hall: Harts
