= Municipal Borough of Slough =

Former municipal borough

Coordinates: 51.51°N 0.593056°W

Slough
- Local government district (1863–1894); Urban district (1894–1938); Municipal borough (1938–1974)
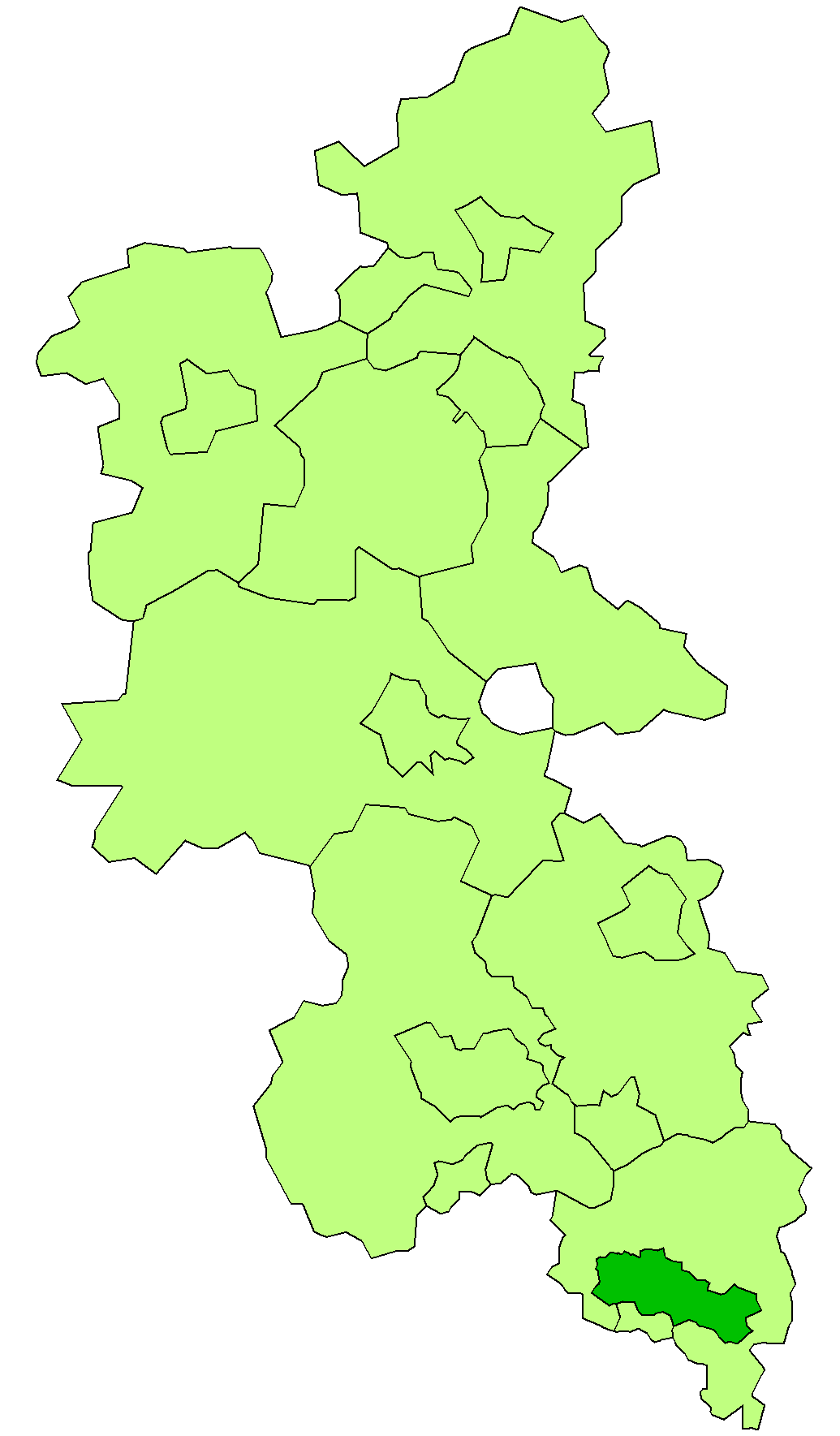
- Slough within Buckinghamshire in 1971
- Area
  - 1911: 1,684 acres (6.81 km^{2})
  - 1961: 6,202 acres (25.10 km^{2})
- Population
  - 1891: 5,426
  - 1911: 14,982
  - 1961: 80,781
  - 1971: 85,795
- Density
  - 1911: 8.9/acre
  - 1961: 13.0/acre
- History
  - Created: 28 June 1863 (Local Government District); 31 December 1894 (Urban District); 14 September 1938 (Municipal Borough)
  - Abolished: 31 March 1974
  - Succeeded by: Slough
- Government
  - Motto: FIDUCIA ET VI (By confidence and strength)
- Coat of arms

Slough was, from 1863 to 1974, a local government district in southern Buckinghamshire, England. It became an urban district in 1894 and was incorporated as a municipal borough in 1938. It was abolished in 1974 and now forms part of the borough of Slough in Berkshire.

== Formation ==
There was no administrative area of Slough prior to 1863; the urban area of the nascent town was mostly in the parish of Upton cum Chalvey, but also extended into the neighbouring parish of Stoke Poges. Both parishes were included in the Eton Poor Law Union from 1835, which (despite being named after Eton) was administered from Slough, where the union workhouse was built.

A public meeting was held in Slough on 28 April 1863, when it was decided to adopt the Local Government Act 1858, creating a local government district for the town, covering parts of the parishes of Upton cum Chalvey and Stoke Poges, to be governed by a local board. With no objections being raised, the district came into being two months later. After elections, the first meeting of the Slough Local Board was held on 26 August 1863 at the Slough Mechanics' Institute, with William Bonsey being elected the first chairman of the board.

Under the Local Government Act 1894 (56 & 57 Vict. c. 73), local government districts became urban districts with effect from 31 December 1894. The act also stipulated that civil parishes could not straddle district boundaries, and so the old parishes of Upton cum Chalvey and Stoke Poges were both split on 4 December 1894, ahead of the new districts coming into force. The part of Upton cum Chalvey within the local government district became a parish called Slough, whilst the part of Stoke Poges within the district became a parish called Stoke-in-Slough. The parishes of Slough and Stoke-in-Slough were both urban parishes and so were not given their own parish councils, but were directly administered by Slough Urban District Council, which replaced the Slough Local Board. The parish of Stoke-in-Slough was abolished in 1896, with the parish of Slough enlarged to cover the whole urban district. The remaining portions of Upton cum Chalvey and Stoke Poges outside the Slough Urban District became parishes within Eton Rural District.

Slough Urban District Council held its first meeting on 31 December 1894 at the local board's old offices at 1 Mackenzie Street. John Dowding was elected the first chairman of the urban district council; he had been the last chairman of the local board.

== Boundary changes ==
The district was subject to a number of boundary changes, which incorporated territory from Eton Rural District:

- In 1900 the urban district gained part of Langley Marish and more of the Upton cum Chalvey civil parishes.
- In 1930, as part of a county review order, it gained 4,461 acres (18.05 km^{2}) of Burnham, Dorney, Farnham Royal, Horton, Langley Marish and Stoke Poges.
- In 1931, as part of another county review order, it gained 57 acres (0.23 km^{2}) of Farnham Royal and Stoke Poges.

== Incorporation ==
On 14 September 1938, under the provisions of the Municipal Corporations Act 1882, the urban district was incorporated by royal charter as a municipal borough and the local authority became Slough Borough Council.

== Coat of arms ==
A coat of arms and motto were granted on 3 September 1938. The coat of arms depicts a swan, the county emblem of Buckinghamshire and brick-axes, indicating local brick-making. The sign for Uranus is taken from the arms of the Herschel family, referring to the discovery of the planet by astronomer William Herschel. The supporters are symbols of trade and industry. The motto Fiducia et vi means 'By confidence and strength'.

== Premises ==
In the early years, the Slough Local Board met at various locations across the town. By the 1890s it had a small office and meeting room on the upper floors of 1 Mackenzie Street, above a shop. The solicitor who acted as clerk to the board had his office a few doors along the street at 11 Mackenzie Street. The premises at Mackenzie Street continued to be used by the urban district council for the first few years after it was created in 1894, but were acknowledged to be increasingly inadequate for the council's needs. In 1905 the council bought a large house called "The Cedars" or "Cedar House" at 4 William Street. The grounds were turned into the council's depot. The house itself was subject to a life tenancy for the elderly lady who lived there; she died in 1908, and the council subsequently moved its offices and meeting place into the house in 1909.

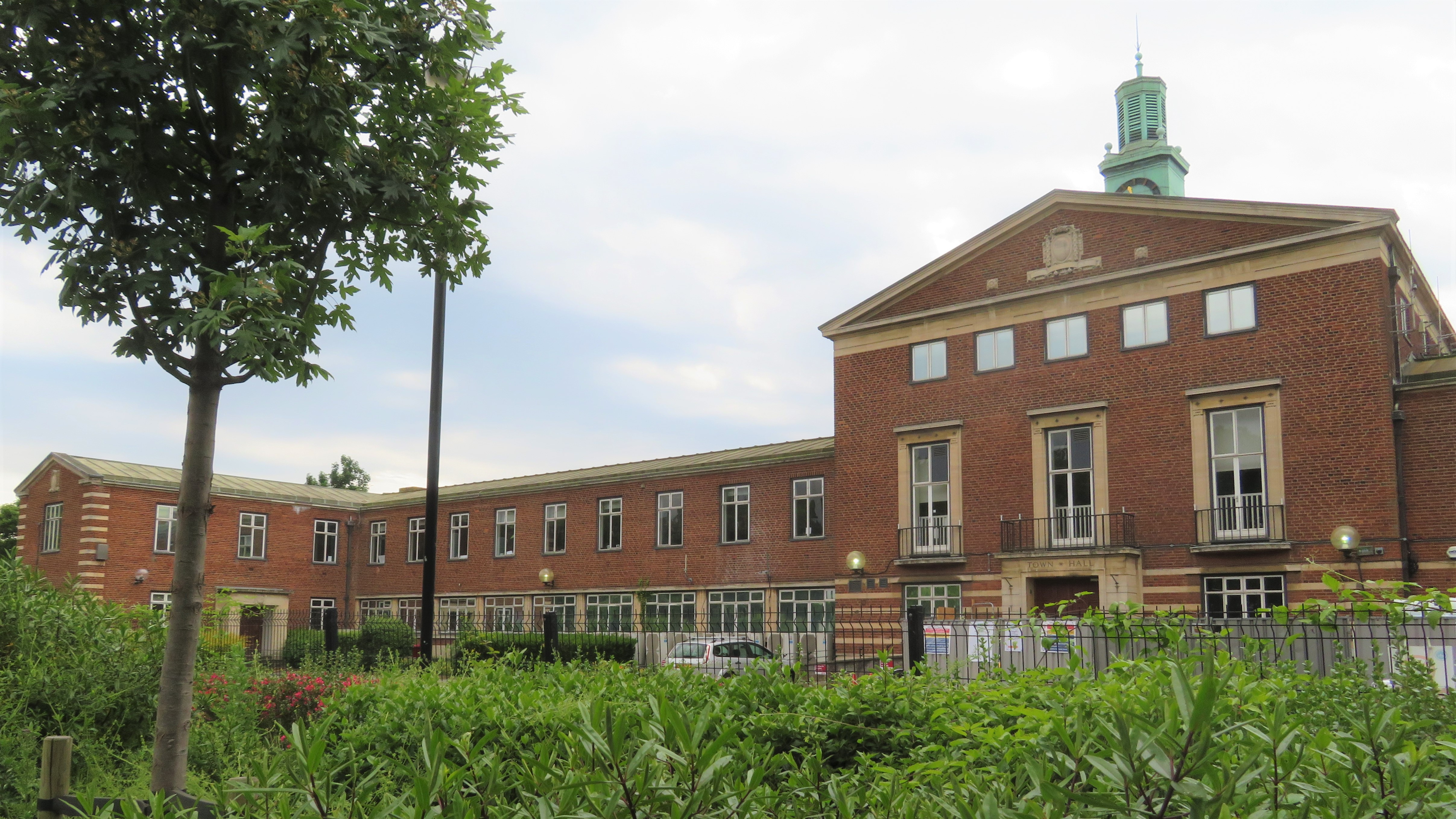
Slough Town Hall, 19 Bath Road

In 1937 the council moved to a purpose-built Town Hall at 19 Bath Road, to the west of the town centre and opposite Salt Hill Park.

== Politics ==
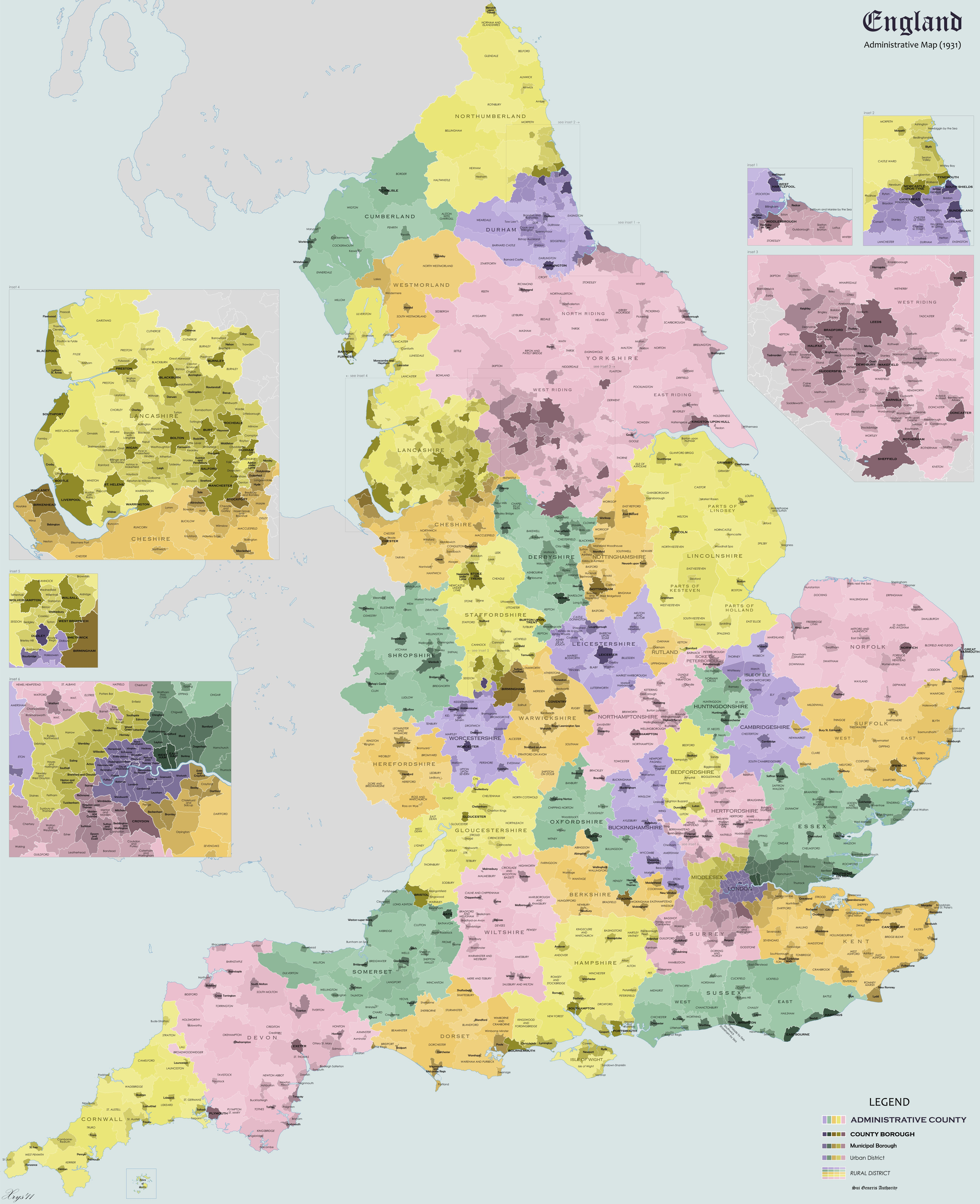
Administrative map of England in 1931.

Political control of the local board, urban district council, and borough council was as follows:

Party in control	Years
Independent	1863-1946
No overall control	1946–1952
Labour	1952–1955
No overall control	1955–1956
Labour	1956–1967
Conservative	1967–1972
Labour	1972–1974

== Abolition ==
The borough was reconstituted in 1974, when all municipal boroughs were abolished under the Local Government Act 1972. A new non-metropolitan district with borough status was created covering the former Slough Municipal Borough and part of Eton Rural District. The new district retained the name Slough, so the name of the local authority continued to be Slough Borough Council. At the same time, the enlarged borough of Slough was transferred from Buckinghamshire to Berkshire. These changes took effect on 1 April 1974.
