= Observatory House =

Municipal building in Slough, Berkshire, England

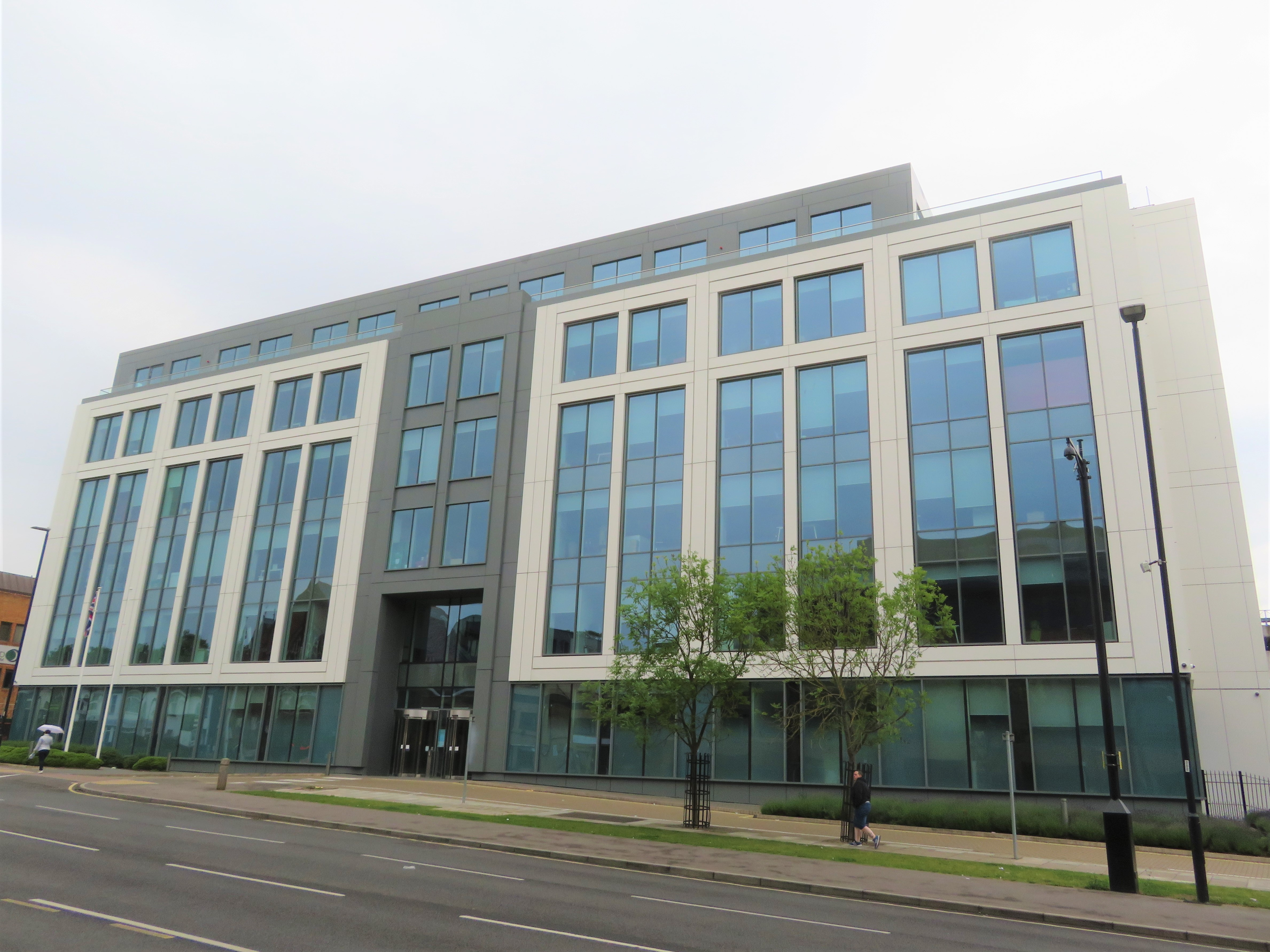
- Observatory House, a modern office block, which now stands at the corner of Herschel Street and Windsor Road in Slough on the site where Herschel's building once stood.
- Interactive map of the Observatory House area

General information
- Type: Municipal headquarters
- Architectural style: Modernist
- Location: 25 Windsor Street, Slough, England
- Coordinates: 51.5082°N 0.5954°W
- Completed: Early 1990s (refurbished 2017)

Technical details
- Floor count: 10

Design and construction
- Architect: Elsworth Sykes Architects (for the refurbishment in 2017)
- Main contractor: Kier Group (for the refurbishment in 2017)

Observatory House was the name of an 18th-century observatory established by William and Caroline Herschel in Windsor Street, Slough. After the original building had been demolished, the name was re-applied to a modern office block on the same site which now serves as the headquarters of Slough Borough Council.

== Herschel's Observatory House ==
The original Observatory House was built, run and used by the astronomer William Herschel, and his sister Caroline. The famous '40-foot telescope' - at that time the largest in the world - was housed there in the late 18th century and early 19th century.

The main house was on Windsor Road. There was also a small cottage on the land. Herschel moved there on 3 April 1786. John Herschel was born in the house, and William died there on 25 August 1822. John Herschel and his family moved out of the house to Hawkhurst in 1840. However, the house continued to be owned by the Herschel family until 1960. There is a poignant section of one of the early programmes by Sir Patrick Moore on BBC "The Sky at Night", which was aired in 1960. Moore talks about the discovery of the planet Uranus by Herschel and how he (Moore) had visited the house, which was "now empty and likely to be demolished." In the garage was a section of the 40 ft telescope still sitting there. Observatory House was demolished in 1963.

== Later buildings on the site ==
In the mid-1960s, the site was redeveloped with an office block, also called Observatory House, being erected there, while the adjoining road to the north was named Hershel Street in recognition of the astronomers. A monument to Herschel was erected in 1969 on Herschel Street, close to where the 40-foot telescope was located. The monument was designed by the Czech sculptor Franta Belsky.

The site was redeveloped again in the early 1990s, with the new building again called Observatory House. The building was then refurbished by Kier Group to a design by Elsworth Sykes Architects ("ESA") for developers, XLB, in 2017. Following completion of the works, the 10-storey building was bought by Slough Borough Council in July 2018 for a reported £41.3 million and converted to become the council's main offices and meeting place, with the first council meetings in the building being held in September 2019.
