= Kent County Council elections =

Local government elections in Kent, England

Kent County Council elections are held every four years to elect Kent County Council in England. Since the last boundary changes in 2019 the council has comprised 81 councillors representing 72 electoral divisions, with each division electing one or two councillors.

== Council composition ==
Year	Conservative	Labour	Liberal Democrats (Note: Includes totals for the predecessors of the Liberal Democrats, the Liberal Party and SDP (both of which participated in the Alliance).)	Reform	Green	UKIP	Independent & Others	Council control after election
Local government reorganisation; council established (102 seats)
1973	62	31	7	–	–	–	2	Conservative
1977	93	8	0	–	0	–	1	Conservative
New division boundaries; seats reduced to 99
1981	64	23	10	–	0	–	2	Conservative
1985	57	24	18	–	0	–	0	Conservative
1989	55	25	18	–	0	–	1	Conservative
1993	41	30	28	–	0	–	0	No overall control
Creation of Medway Council; seats reduced to 84
1997	46	23	15	–	0	0	0	Conservative
2001	52	22	10	–	0	0	0	Conservative
New division boundaries; seats remain at 84
2005	57	21	6	–	0	0	0	Conservative
2009	74	2	7	–	0	0	1	Conservative
2013	45	13	7	–	1	17	1	Conservative
New division boundaries; seats reduced to 81
2017	67	5	7	–	1	0	1	Conservative
2021	62	7	6	0	4	0	2	Conservative
2025	5	2	12	57	5	0	0	Reform

== County result maps ==
2005 results map

2009 results map

2013 results map

2017 results map

2021 results map

2025 results map

== By-election results ==
=== 1997-2001 ===
Medway North Central By-Election 24 July 1997
Party	Candidate	Votes	%	±%
Labour		979	72.0	+15.3
Conservative		381	28.0	−3.3
Majority		598	44.0	
Turnout		1,360		
Labour hold		Swing		

Ashford South By-Election 9 July 1998
Party	Candidate	Votes	%	±%
Labour		792	54.5	−0.5
Liberal Democrats		370	25.5	+5.1
Conservative		240	16.5	−8.1
BNP		50	3.4	+3.4
Majority		422	29.0	
Turnout		1,452	13.2	
Labour hold		Swing		

Malling Rural NE By-Election 6 May 1999
Party	Candidate	Votes	%	±%
Liberal Democrats		1,894	44.2	+7.7
Conservative		1,614	37.7	−1.0
Labour		778	18.2	−6.5
Majority		280	6.5	
Turnout		4,286	32.3	
Liberal Democrats gain from Conservative		Swing		

Swanscombe & Stone By-Election 14 September 2000
Party	Candidate	Votes	%	±%
Conservative		862	37.3	+9.0
Labour		760	32.9	−5.3
Independent		446	19.3	−1.4
Liberal Democrats		245	10.6	−2.2
Majority		102	4.4	
Turnout		2,313	15.1	
Conservative gain from Labour		Swing		

=== 2001-2005 ===
Cranbrook By-Election 19 September 2002
Party	Candidate	Votes	%	±%
Conservative		1,708	65.0	+7.7
Liberal Democrats		497	18.9	−6.0
Labour		216	8.2	−9.6
UKIP		207	7.9	+7.9
Majority		1,211	46.1	
Turnout		2,628	23.1	
Conservative hold		Swing		

Ashford South East By-Election 29 April 2004
Party	Candidate	Votes	%	±%
Liberal Democrats	George Koowaree	1,089	34.1	−2.4
Conservative	Noel Greaves	986	30.9	−1.8
Labour	Leslie Lawrie	459	14.4	−20.0
Independent	Melvyn Elliff	386	12.1	+12.1
Green	Stephen Dawe	140	4.4	+4.4
National Front	John Kellam	135	4.2	+4.2
Majority		103	3.2	
Turnout		3,195	26.9	
Liberal Democrats hold		Swing		

=== 2005-2009 ===
Maidstone North East By-Election 12 July 2007
Party	Candidate	Votes	%	±%
Liberal Democrats	Ian Chittenden	1,620	56.2	+12.5
Conservative	Vanessa Jones	831	28.8	−1.3
Green	Stuart Jeffery	187	6.5	+2.5
Labour	Patrick Coates	164	5.7	−12.5
UKIP	Mark Croucher	81	2.8	−1.3
Majority		789	27.4	
Turnout		2,883	24.3	
Liberal Democrats hold		Swing		

Dover Town By-Election 27 September 2007
Party	Candidate	Votes	%	±%
Labour	Gordon Cowan	1,860	44.5	−5.8
Conservative	Nigel Collor	1,348	32.2	+4.1
Liberal Democrats	Dean Stiles	420	10.0	−11.6
Independent	Victor Matcham	300	7.2	+7.2
UKIP	Peter Campbell-Marshall	256	6.1	+6.1
Majority		512	12.3	
Turnout		4,184	19.5	
Labour hold		Swing		

Herne Bay By-Election 9 October 2008
Party	Candidate	Votes	%	±%
Conservative	Jean Law	2,474	47.7	+9.0
Liberal Democrats	Margaret Flaherty	1,524	29.4	−2.2
Labour	Michael Kenneth Britton	537	10.4	−12.4
BNP	Dennis Whiting	399	7.7	+7.7
UKIP	Brian Eric MacDowall	252	4.9	−2.1
Majority		950	18.1	+11.0
Turnout		5,196	23.2	
Conservative hold		Swing		

=== 2009-2013 ===
Dover Town By-Election 16 December 2010
Party	Candidate	Votes	%	±%
Labour	Gordon Cowan	1,491	43.7	+14.3
Conservative	Patrick Sherratt	1,348	39.5	−4.3
UKIP	Victor Matcham	404	11.8	+11.8
Liberal Democrats	John Trickey	170	5.0	−21.8
Majority		143	4.2	
Turnout		3,413		
Labour gain from Conservative		Swing		

Tonbridge By-Election 20 January 2011
Party	Candidate	Votes	%	±%
Conservative	Alice Hohler	3,229	56.6	+9.3
Labour	Emily Williams	1,216	21.3	+11.9
Liberal Democrats	Garry Bridge	561	9.8	−5.9
Green	Hazel Dawe	366	6.4	−3.8
UKIP	David Waller	337	5.9	−6.8
Majority		2,013	35.3	
Turnout		5,709		
Conservative hold		Swing		

Romney Marsh By-Election 1 February 2011
Party	Candidate	Votes	%	±%
Conservative	Carole Waters	2,222	54.1	+7.6
Labour	Doug Suckling	748	18.2	+11.5
Liberal Democrats	Val Loseby	479	11.7	−1.3
UKIP	David Cammegh	420	10.2	−13.3
Independent	Rochelle Saunders	238	5.8	+5.8
Majority		1,474	35.9	
Turnout		4,107		
Conservative hold		Swing		

Tunbridge Wells East By-Election 14 June 2012
Party	Candidate	Votes	%	±%
Conservative	James Tansley	1,171	32.3	−17.0
Liberal Democrats	David Neve	1,022	28.2	−3.6
UKIP	Christopher Hoare	1,000	27.6	+15.4
Labour	Ian Carvell	321	8.9	+2.2
Green	Hazel Dawe	109	3.0	+3.0
Majority		149	4.1	
Turnout		3,623		
Conservative hold		Swing		

Maidstone Central By-Election 18 October 2012
Party	Candidate	Votes	%	±%
Liberal Democrats	Robert Bird	2,169	40.1	−5.7
Conservative	Paul Butcher	1,301	24.1	−1.6
Labour	Paul Harper	943	17.4	+11.2
UKIP	John Stanford	510	9.4	−3.7
Green	Stuart Jeffery	393	7.3	−2.0
English Democrat	Michael Walters	83	1.6	+1.6
Majority		868	16.1	
Turnout		5,405		
Liberal Democrats hold		Swing		

Gravesham Rural By-Election 20 December 2012
Party	Candidate	Votes	%	±%
Conservative	Bryan Sweetland	1,780	61.3	+1.3
UKIP	Geoffrey Clark	634	21.8	+21.8
Labour	Douglas Christie	397	13.7	+4.2
Liberal Democrats	Gill McGill	91	3.1	−6.0
Majority		1,146	39.5	
Turnout		2,902		
Conservative hold		Swing		

=== 2013-2017 ===
Romney Marsh By-Election 7 May 2015
Party	Candidate	Votes	%	±%
Conservative	Carole Waters	4,913	43.8	+5.2
UKIP	Susanna Govett	3,903	34.8	−4.2
Labour	Arran Harvey	1,342	12.0	−0.7
Liberal Democrats	Valerie Loseby	626	5.6	+1.5
Green	Andrew South	435	3.9	−1.7
Majority		1,010	9.0	
Turnout		11,219		
Conservative gain from UKIP		Swing		

Gravesham East By-Election 18 August 2016
Party	Candidate	Votes	%	±%
Conservative	Diane Marsh	1,758	36.0	+8.4
Labour	Lyn Milner	1,538	31.5	−4.7
UKIP	Tina Brooker	1,272	26.0	+2.8
Green	Martin Wilson	209	4.3	+4.3
Liberal Democrats	Mark Marsh	110	2.3	−1.5
Majority		220	4.5	
Turnout		4,887		
Conservative gain from Labour		Swing		

Swanley By-Election 13 October 2016
Party	Candidate	Votes	%	±%
Conservative	Michael Horwood	717	32.4	−8.7
UKIP	James Halford	615	27.8	+7.9
Labour	Angela George	518	23.4	−8.9
Liberal Democrats	Robert Woodbridge	362	16.4	+16.4
Majority		102	4.6	
Turnout		2,212		
Conservative hold		Swing		

=== 2017-2021 ===
Birchington and Rural By-Election 11 January 2018
Party	Candidate	Votes	%	±%
Conservative	Liz Hurst	2,534	56.6	+6.1
Labour	Pauline Farrance	856	19.1	+2.9
Liberal Democrats	Angie Curwen	561	12.5	+0.5
UKIP	Zita Wiltshire	357	8.0	−7.8
Green	Natasha Ransom	169	3.8	−1.8
Majority		1,678	37.5	
Turnout		4,477		
Conservative hold		Swing		

Canterbury North By-Election 15 November 2018
Party	Candidate	Votes	%	±%
Conservative	Robert Thomas	1,355	42.3	−12.4
Liberal Democrats	Alex Lister	756	23.6	+7.1
Labour	Ben Hickman	660	20.6	+4.1
Green	Henry Stanton	157	4.9	−1.9
Independent	Joe Egerton	155	4.8	+4.8
UKIP	Joe Simons	120	3.7	−2.0
Majority		599	18.7	
Turnout		3,203		
Conservative hold		Swing		

Northfleet and Gravesend West By-Election 2 May 2019
Party	Candidate	Votes	%	±%
Labour	John Burden	3,713	43.5	+0.6
Conservative	Jordan Meade	2,404	28.1	−10.3
UKIP	Emmanuel Feyisetan	1,469	17.2	+7.2
Green	Marna Gilligan	624	7.3	+3.1
Liberal Democrats	Ukonu Obasi	333	3.9	−0.5
Majority		1,309	15.3	
Turnout		8,543		
Labour hold		Swing		

Sittingbourne North By-Election 2 May 2019
Party	Candidate	Votes	%	±%
Swale Ind.	Jason Clinch	1,496	35.7	+35.7
Labour	Tony Winckless	1,341	32.0	+0.2
Conservative	Sarah Aldridge	1,064	25.4	−15.2
Liberal Democrats	Alexander Stennings	284	6.8	−2.0
Majority		155	3.7	
Turnout		4,185		
Swale Ind. gain from Conservative		Swing		

=== 2021-2025 ===
Wilmington By-Election 27 January 2022
Party	Candidate	Votes	%	±%
Conservative	Av Sandhu	1,787	57.9	−14.5
Labour	Darren Povey	613	19.9	−0.1
Liberal Democrats	Amanda Capell	487	15.8	+15.8
Green	Julian Hood	200	6.5	−1.1
Majority		1,174	38.0	
Turnout		3,087		
Conservative hold		Swing		

Hythe West By-Election 2 March 2023
Party	Candidate	Votes	%	±%
Green	Jenni Hawkins	1,568	43.8	+6.0
Conservative	John Gabris	1,081	30.2	−18.9
Labour	Tony Cooper	384	10.7	+1.3
Independent	Ian Meyers	306	8.6	
Independent	Andy Weatherhead	237	6.6	
Majority		487	13.6	
Turnout		3,576		
Green gain from Conservative		Swing		

Sheppey By-Election 2 March 2023
Party	Candidate	Votes	%	±%
Conservative	Mike Whiting	2,318	33.3	−17.7
Swale Ind.	Elliott Jayes	2,258	32.5	+14.2
Labour	Peter Apps	1,896	27.3	+10.7
Liberal Democrats	Linda Brinklow	481	6.9	+3.2
Majority		60	0.9	
Turnout		6,953		
Conservative hold		Swing		

Maidstone Central By-Election 6 July 2023
Party	Candidate	Votes	%	±%
Liberal Democrats	Chris Passmore	1,860	28.5	−1.6
Green	Stuart Jeffery	1,849	28.4	+13.9
Conservative	Stanley Forecast	1,564	24.0	−12.4
Labour	David Collier	914	14.0	−5.0
Reform	Graham Jarvis	278	4.3	+4.3
Independent	Yolande Kenward	56	0.9	+0.9
Majority		11	0.2	
Turnout		6,521		
Liberal Democrats hold		Swing		

Swanscombe and Greenhithe By-Election 21 November 2024
Party	Candidate	Votes	%	±%
Reform	Thomas Mallon	695	29.1	+27.5
Labour Co-op	Victoria Akintomide-Akinwamide	588	24.6	−7.5
Residents	Dawn Johnston	395	16.5	−23.9
Conservative	Carol Gale	374	15.6	−10.3
Green	Laura Edie	296	12.4	+12.4
Liberal Democrats	James Willis	44	1.8	+1.8
Majority		107	4.5	−3.8
Turnout		2392	15	
Reform gain from Residents		Swing	▲25.7	

=== 2025-2029 ===
Cliftonville By-Election 9 April 2026
Party	Candidate	Votes	%	±%
Green	Rob Yates	2,068	38.8	+26.8
Reform	Marc Rattigan	1,767	33.1	−7.1
Conservative	Charlie Leys	811	15.2	−4.5
Labour	Joanne Bright	557	10.4	−11.6
Independent	Lucy Gray	68	1.3	+1.3
Liberal Democrats	Mo Shafaei	63	1.2	−1.7
Majority		301	5.7	
Turnout		5,344	37.7	
Green gain from Reform		Swing		
