= 2001 United Kingdom local elections =

- 7 June 2001

All 34 non-metropolitan counties, 11 out of 46 unitary authorities, 1 sui generis authority and all 26 Northern Irish districts
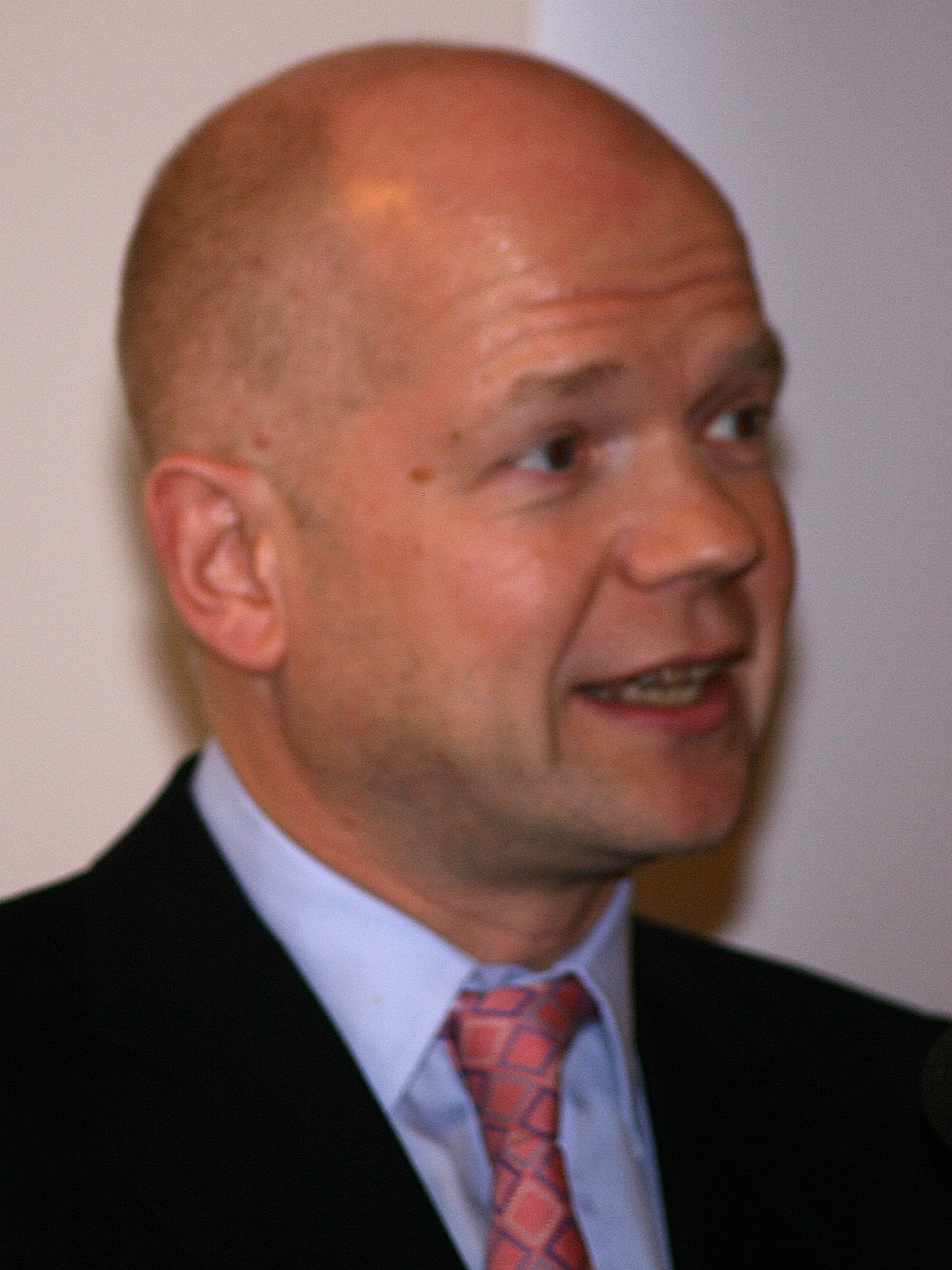

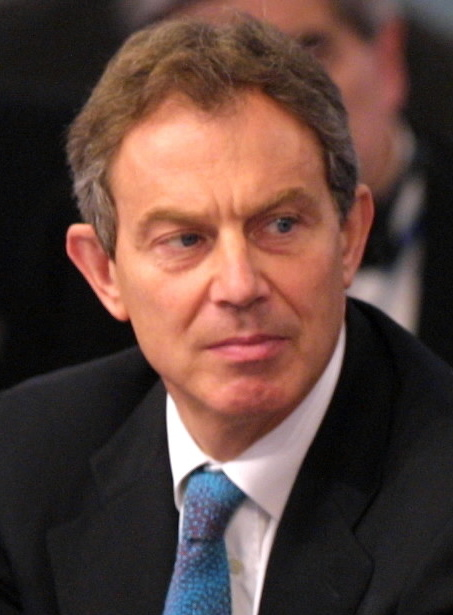

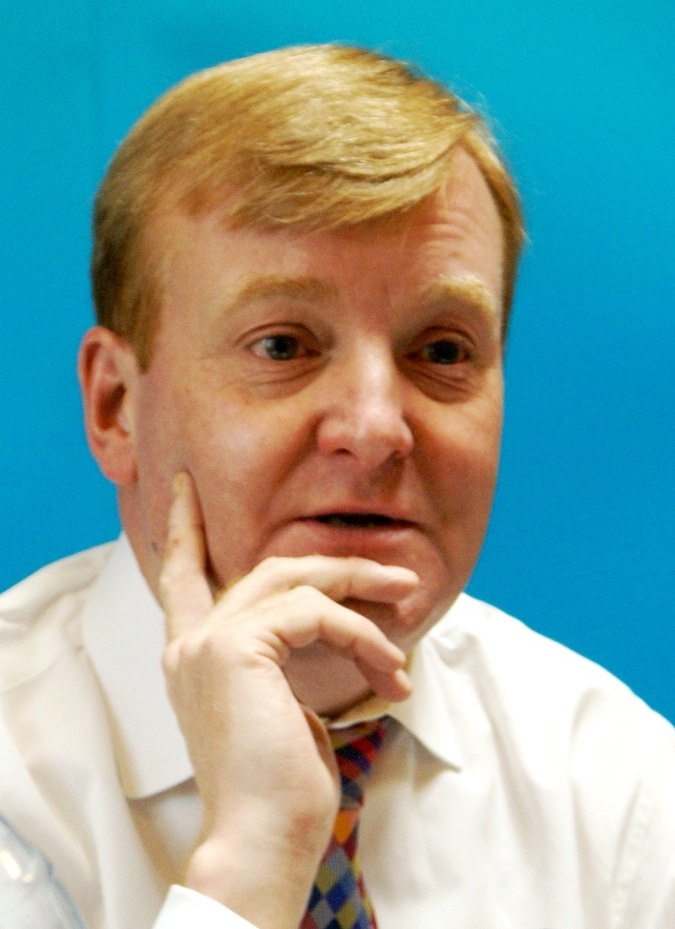
	Majority party	Minority party	Third party
Leader	William Hague	Tony Blair	Charles Kennedy
Party	Conservative	Labour	Liberal Democrats
Leader since	19 June 1997	21 July 1994	9 August 1999
Percentage	40%	31%	25%
Swing	▲8%	▲1%	▼1%
Councils	18	14	0
Councils +/-	▲5	▼2	▼2
Councillors	1,093	843	449
Councillors +/-	▲120	▲7	▼80
- Colours denote the winning party, as shown in the main table of results.

The 2001 United Kingdom local elections took place on Thursday 7 June 2001. Elections took place for all of the English shire counties, some English unitary authorities and all of the Northern Ireland districts. The elections were delayed from the usual date of the first Thursday in May due to the 2001 foot and mouth crisis and were held on the same day as the 2001 general election, which was also delayed for the same reason.

While the results were overshadowed by the re-election of the Labour government, they did provide some comfort to the Conservative Party. The Conservatives consolidated their position as the largest party on the English county councils.

== Results ==
The results of the English local elections saw the Conservative Party make significant progress, gaining control of a further five councils. The Labour Party lost control of Cumbria and Warwickshire county councils, while the Liberal Democrats suffered losses of both of their councils and councillors.

The results in a number of these councils were mostly in line with the general election results.

The Conservatives gain of Cheshire county council coincided with their gain of the Tatton constituency, while their gain of Norfolk county council coincided with a gain in North West Norfolk and a big swing to them in South West Norfolk (although there was a Lib Dem gain in North Norfolk but only on a small swing). The Lib Dem loss of Somerset coincided with them narrowly losing Taunton to the Conservatives, and falling back in key target seats such as Wells and Bridgwater, which fall under the county council's area.

Some bucked trends, however. Labour lost Cumbria despite holding up relatively well in their four parliamentary seats in the county, though the Conservative majority was eroded by the Lib Dems in Westmorland and Lonsdale, which the Lib Dems eventually won in 2005 and have held ever since. Warwickshire was lost by Labour, which was admittedly on a knife-edge, though this was despite swings in their favour in key Conservative targets such as Rugby & Kenilworth and Warwick & Leamington.

The Conservatives gained Dorset. Despite the fact in 1997 when they won every constituency in Dorset (some by small margins admittedly), the council remained in no overall control. Whereas this time when they gained control of it, they lost two parliamentary seats: Dorset South to Labour and Mid-Dorset & Poole North to the Lib Dems by small margins. Despite those gains and some swings to the Lib Dems in other seats in Dorset, there was a big swing to the Conservatives in Christchurch.

The Lib Dem loss of Devon county council coincided with the Lib Dems actually gaining Teignbridge from the Conservatives and significantly increasing their majority in Torbay, a key Conservative target. There were smaller swings away in the Conservatives' favour in their marginal seats such as Tiverton & Honiton and Totnes, and they achieved a small swing in one of their targets, Devon West & Torridge.

Party	Councils				Councillors			
Party	Gain	Loss	Change	Total	Gain	Loss	Change	Total
Conservative			▲+5	18			▲+120	1,093
Labour			▼-2	14			▲+7	843
Liberal Democrats			▼-2	0			▼-80	449
Independent			Steady	0			▼-25	67
Other	0	0	Steady	0			▼-1	28
No overall control			▼-1	13	—	—	—	—

== England ==
=== Non-metropolitan county councils ===
In all 34 English county councils the whole council was up for election.

Council	Previous control	Result	Details
Bedfordshire	Conservative	Conservative hold	Details
Buckinghamshire	Conservative	Conservative hold	Details
Cambridgeshire	Conservative	Conservative hold	Details
Cheshire ‡	No overall control	Conservative gain	Details
Cornwall	No overall control	No overall control hold	Details
Cumbria ‡	Labour	No overall control gain	Details
Derbyshire	Labour	Labour hold	Details
Devon	Liberal Democrats	No overall control gain	Details
Dorset	No overall control	Conservative gain	Details
Durham	Labour	Labour hold	Details
East Sussex	No overall control	Conservative gain	Details
Essex	Conservative	Conservative hold	Details
Gloucestershire	No overall control	No overall control hold	Details
Hampshire	Conservative	Conservative hold	Details
Hertfordshire ‡	Conservative	Conservative hold	Details
Kent	Conservative	Conservative hold	Details
Lancashire	Labour	Labour hold	Details
Leicestershire	No overall control	Conservative gain	Details
Lincolnshire ‡	Conservative	Conservative hold	Details
Norfolk	No overall control	Conservative gain	Details
North Yorkshire	Conservative	Conservative hold	Details
Northamptonshire ‡	Labour	Labour hold	Details
Northumberland ‡	Labour	Labour hold	Details
Nottinghamshire	Labour	Labour hold	Details
Oxfordshire	No overall control	No overall control hold (Con/Lib Dem coalition)	Details
Shropshire	No overall control	No overall control hold	Details
Somerset ‡	Liberal Democrats	No overall control gain	Details
Staffordshire	Labour	Labour hold	Details
Suffolk	No overall control	No overall control hold	Details
Surrey	Conservative	Conservative hold	Details
Warwickshire	Labour	No overall control gain	Details
West Sussex	Conservative	Conservative hold	Details
Wiltshire	Conservative	Conservative hold	Details
Worcestershire	No overall control	No overall control hold	Details

‡ New ward boundaries

=== Unitary authorities ===
In two English unitary authorities the whole council was up for election while a further nine unitary authorities had one third of the council up for election.

==== Whole council ====
Council	Previous control	Result	Details
Isle of Wight ‡	No overall control	No overall control hold	Details
Southend-on-Sea ‡	Conservative	Conservative hold	Details

‡ New ward boundaries

==== Third of council ====
Council	Previous control	Result	Details
Blackburn with Darwen	Labour	Labour hold	Details
Bristol	Labour	Labour hold	Details
Halton	Labour	Labour hold	Details
Peterborough	No overall control	No overall control hold	Details
Reading	Labour	Labour hold	Details
Slough	Labour	Labour hold	Details
Thurrock	Labour	Labour hold	Details
Warrington	Labour	Labour hold	Details
Wokingham	No overall control	No overall control hold	Details

=== Sui generis ===
Council	Previous control	Result	Details
Isles of Scilly			Details

== Northern Ireland ==
In all 26 Northern Ireland districts the whole council was up for election. They were elected by Single transferable vote. They saw the Democratic Unionist Party and Sinn Féin make gains at the expense of the other parties.

Council	Previous control	Result	Details
Antrim	No overall control	No overall control	Details
Ards	No overall control	No overall control	Details
Armagh	No overall control	No overall control	Details
Ballymena	No overall control	No overall control	Details
Ballymoney	No overall control	DUP	Details
Banbridge	UUP	No overall control	Details
Belfast	No overall control	No overall control	Details
Carrickfergus	No overall control	No overall control	Details
Castlereagh	No overall control	No overall control	Details
Coleraine	No overall control	No overall control	Details
Cookstown	No overall control	No overall control	Details
Craigavon	No overall control	No overall control	Details
Derry	No overall control	No overall control	Details
Down	SDLP	No overall control	Details
Dungannon and South Tyrone	No overall control	No overall control	Details
Fermanagh	No overall control	No overall control	Details
Larne	No overall control	No overall control	Details
Limavady	No overall control	No overall control	Details
Lisburn	No overall control	No overall control	Details
Magherafelt	No overall control	No overall control	Details
Moyle	No overall control	No overall control	Details
Newry and Mourne	No overall control	No overall control	Details
Newtownabbey	No overall control	No overall control	Details
North Down	No overall control	No overall control	Details
Omagh	No overall control	No overall control	Details
Strabane	No overall control	No overall control	Details
