= 2001 Northumberland County Council election =

2001 UK local government election

← 1997	7 June 2001	2005 →

All 67 seats to Northumberland County Council 34 seats needed for a majority
- Turnout: 61.6%
	First party	Second party
Party	Labour	Conservative
Last election	43	13
Seats won	38	17
Seat change	▼5	▲4
Popular vote	60,944	36,801
Percentage	40.7%	24.5%
	Third party	Fourth party
Party	Liberal Democrats	Independent
Last election	8	2
Seats won	9	3
Seat change	▲1	▲1
Popular vote	44,502	6,953
Percentage	29.7%	4.6%
- Map of the results of the 2001 local election.
Control of Council before election
Labour Party
Control of Council after election
Labour Party

Local elections to Northumberland County Council, a county council in the north east of England, were held on 7 June 2001. It was the first election to be held under new ward boundaries that increased the number of seats from 66 to 67. The Labour Party retained overall control of the council.

== Results ==
Northumberland County Council election, 2001
Party	Seats	Gains	Losses	Net gain/loss	Seats %	Votes %	Votes	+/−
Labour	38					40.7		▼4.1
Conservative	17					24.5		▲0.2
Liberal Democrats	9					29.7		▲3.7
Independent	3					4.6		▲0.9
Green	0				0.0	0.5		▼0.2
