= 1997 United Kingdom local elections =

- 1 May 1997 (England); 21 May 1997 (Northern Ireland)

All 34 non-metropolitan counties, 21 out of 46 unitary authorities, 1 out of 238 English districts, 1 sui generis authority and all 26 Northern Irish districts
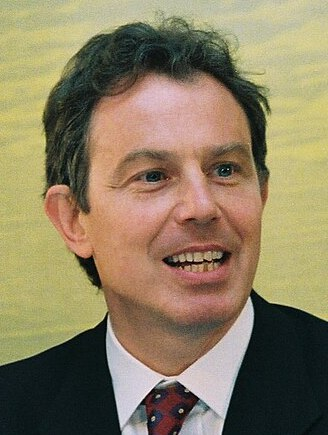

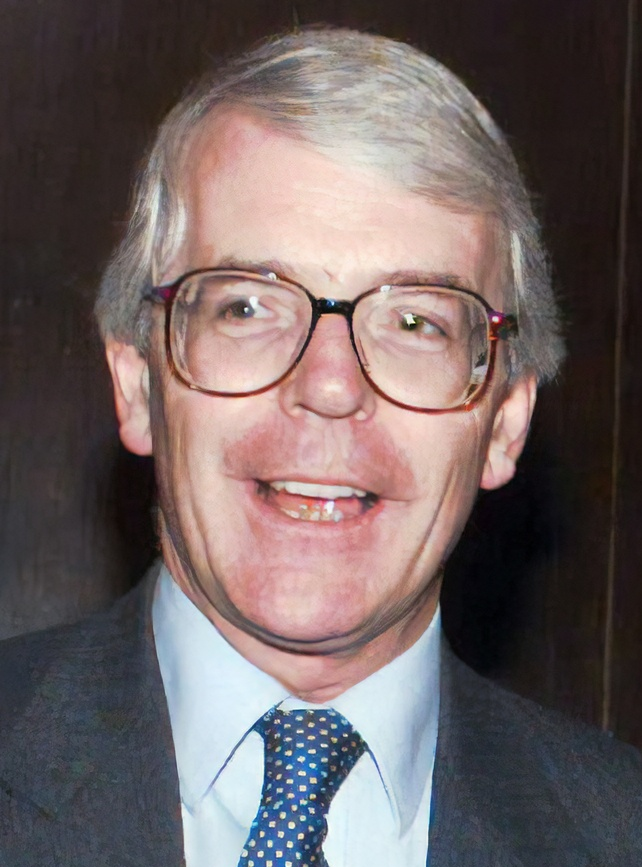

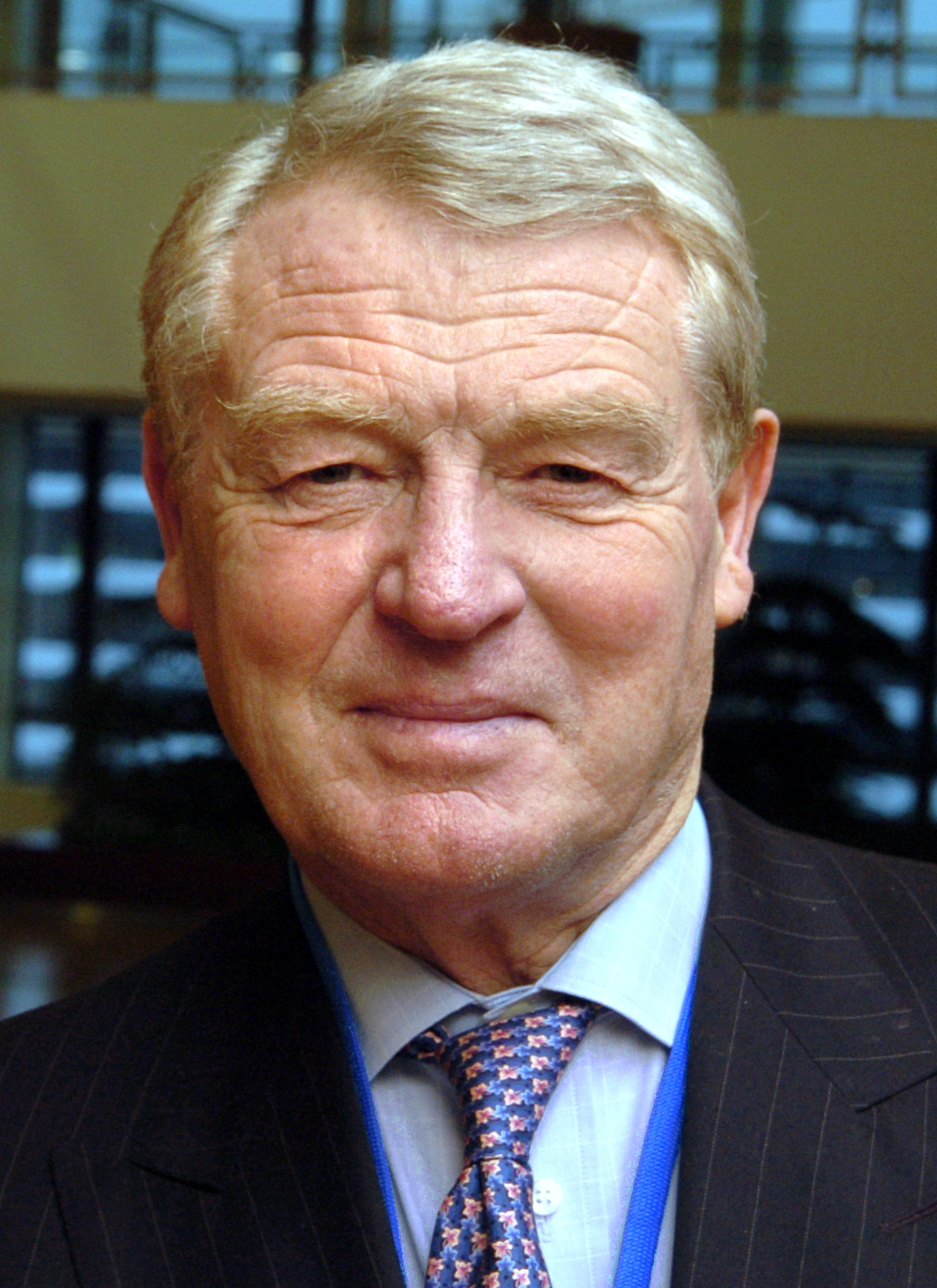
	Majority party	Minority party	Third party
Leader	Tony Blair	John Major	Paddy Ashdown
Party	Labour	Conservative	Liberal Democrats
Leader since	21 July 1994	27 November 1990 (Note: Major resigned as Leader of the Conservative Party on 22 June 1995 to face critics in his party and government, and was re-elected as Leader on 4 July 1995)	16 July 1988
Projected vote share (Note: All vote shares in the infobox are projected national vote shares calculated by the BBC.)	40% ▼3 pp	29%	26%
Councillors	1,299	1,121	741
Councillors +/-	▲1	▲193	▼177
- Colours denote the winning party, as shown in the main table of results.

The 1997 United Kingdom local elections took place on Thursday 1 May 1997 in England, and Wednesday 21 May 1997 in Northern Ireland. Elections took place for all of the English country councils, some English unitary authorities and all of the Northern Ireland districts. The local elections were held on the same day as the 1997 general election.

== Results ==
Party	Councils				Councillors			
Party	Gain	Loss	Change	Total	Gain	Loss	Change	Total
Labour							▲1	1,299
Liberal Democrats							▼177	741
Conservative							▲193	1,121
Other							▼17	131
No overall control					—	—	—	—

While the results were overshadowed by the landslide election of a Labour government, they did provide some comfort to the Conservative Party. The Conservatives made some gains and were the largest party in the county council elections. It is likely that what helped the Conservatives gain some councils (Cambridgeshire, Bedfordshire, Essex and Kent) was the creation of unitary authorities and thus the abolition of county council divisions in these areas (in this case unitaries in Peterborough, Luton, Thurrock and Medway), in predominantly urbanised areas which are usually strong for the Labour Party in elections and indeed all four of those unitaries (and all of the parliamentary seats that they cover) were won/held by Labour at the point these elections took place. Buckinghamshire, the only county council that the Conservatives actually had a majority for the four years prior to these elections, will have also been helped by the creation of a unitary authority for Milton Keynes in 1996.

The gains for the Conservatives in Lincolnshire, Surrey and West Sussex will likely have been helped by the fact that most parliamentary seats in these counties were seriously strong Conservative areas (indeed, every parliamentary seat in Surrey was retained by the Conservatives in the general election) and thus saw some genuine ground recovered compared with the 1993 local elections. The only seats that the Conservatives lost in the general election in these areas were Lincoln and Crawley, both of which were very easy seats for Labour to gain in the general election, while they came close to losing Boston & Skegness to Labour too, though this was far from enough to have made a difference to council control in their respective counties.

== England ==
=== Non-metropolitan county councils ===
In 34 non-metropolitan counties the whole council was up for election.

Council	Previous control	Result	Details
Bedfordshire County Council	No overall control	Conservative gain	Details
Buckinghamshire County Council	Conservative	Conservative hold	Details
Cambridgeshire County Council ‡	No overall control	Conservative gain	Details
Cheshire County Council ‡	No overall control	No overall control hold	Details
Cornwall County Council	Liberal Democrats	No overall control gain	Details
Cumbria County Council	No overall control	Labour gain	Details
Derbyshire County Council	Labour	Labour hold	Details
Devon County Council ‡	No overall control	Liberal Democrats gain	Details
Dorset County Council	No overall control	No overall control hold	Details
Durham	Labour	Labour hold	Details
East Sussex County Council	No overall control	No overall control hold	Details
Essex County Council ‡	No overall control	Conservative gain	Details
Gloucestershire County Council	No overall control	No overall control hold	Details
Hampshire County Council	No overall control	No overall control hold	Details
Hertfordshire County Council	No overall control	No overall control hold	Details
Kent County Council ‡	No overall control	Conservative gain	Details
Lancashire County Council ‡	Labour	Labour hold	Details
Leicestershire County Council	No overall control	No overall control hold	Details
Lincolnshire County Council	No overall control	Conservative gain	Details
Norfolk County Council	No overall control	No overall control hold	Details
North Yorkshire County Council	No overall control	No overall control hold	Details
Northamptonshire County Council	Labour	Labour hold	Details
Northumberland County Council	Labour	Labour hold	Details
Nottinghamshire County Council ‡	Labour	Labour hold	Details
Oxfordshire County Council	No overall control	No overall control hold	Details
Shropshire County Council ‡	No overall control	No overall control hold	Details
Somerset County Council	Liberal Democrats	Liberal Democrats hold	Details
Staffordshire County Council ‡	Labour	Labour hold	Details
Suffolk County Council	No overall control	No overall control hold	Details
Surrey County Council	No overall control	Conservative gain	Details
Warwickshire County Council	No overall control	No overall control hold	Details
West Sussex County Council	No overall control	Conservative gain	Details
Wiltshire County Council ‡	No overall control	No overall control hold	Details
Worcestershire County Council †	No overall control	No overall control hold	Details

† Elected as a "shadow authority" until 1 April 1998.

‡ Because areas of the county were due to become unitary authorities on 1 April 1998, the county councillors representing those areas had their terms extended by one year and no election was held.

=== Unitary authorities ===
==== Whole council ====
These were the first elections to 19 more unitary authorities established by the Local Government Commission for England (1992). They acted as "shadow authorities" until 1 April 1998.

Council	Previous control	Result	Details
Blackburn with Darwen ‡	New Council	Labour	Details
Blackpool Council ‡	New Council	Labour	Details
Bracknell Forest Council	New Council	Conservative	Details
Halton Borough Council ‡	New Council	Labour	Details
Herefordshire Council ‡	New Council	Liberal Democrats	Details
Medway Council ‡	New Council	Labour	Details
Nottingham City Council	New Council	Labour	Details
Peterborough City Council ‡	New Council	Labour	Details
Plymouth City Council	New Council	Labour	Details
Reading Borough Council	New Council	Labour	Details
Slough Borough Council	New Council	Labour	Details
Southend-on-Sea Borough Council	New Council	No overall control	Details
Telford and Wrekin Council ‡	New Council	Labour	Details
Thurrock Council ‡	New Council	Labour	Details
Torbay Council	New Council	Liberal Democrats	Details
Warrington Borough Council ‡	New Council	Labour	Details
West Berkshire Council ‡	New Council	Liberal Democrats	Details
Windsor and Maidenhead Borough Council	New Council	No overall control	Details
Wokingham Borough Council	New Council	Conservative	Details

‡ New ward boundaries from predecessor authorities

==== Third of council ====
In 2 unitary authorities one third of the council was up for election.

Council	Previous control	Result	Details
Bristol City Council	Labour	Labour hold	Details
Kingston upon Hull	Labour	Labour hold	Details

=== District council ===
In 1 district the whole council was up for election.

Council	Previous control	Result	Details
Malvern Hills District Council ‡	No overall control	No overall control hold	Details

‡ New ward boundaries

=== Sui generis ===
Council	Previous control	Result	Details
Council of the Isles of Scilly	Independent	Independent hold	Details

== Northern Ireland ==
Council	Previous control	Result	Details
Antrim Borough Council	No overall control	No overall control	Details
Ards	No overall control	No overall control	Details
Armagh	No overall control	No overall control	Details
Ballymena	No overall control	No overall control	Details
Ballymoney	No overall control	No overall control	Details
Banbridge	UUP	UUP	Details
Belfast	No overall control	No overall control	Details
Carrickfergus	No overall control	No overall control	Details
Castlereagh	No overall control	No overall control	Details
Coleraine	UUP	No overall control	Details
Cookstown	No overall control	No overall control	Details
Craigavon	No overall control	No overall control	Details
Derry	SDLP	No overall control	Details
Down	SDLP	SDLP	Details
Dungannon	No overall control	No overall control	Details
Fermanagh	No overall control	No overall control	Details
Larne	No overall control	No overall control	Details
Limavady	No overall control	No overall control	Details
Lisburn	UUP	No overall control	Details
Magherafelt	No overall control	No overall control	Details
Moyle	No overall control	No overall control	Details
Newry and Mourne	SDLP	No overall control	Details
Newtownabbey	No overall control	No overall control	Details
North Down	No overall control	No overall control	Details
Omagh	No overall control	No overall control	Details
Strabane	No overall control	No overall control	Details
