= 2005 Shropshire County Council election =

2005 UK local government election

Results of the 2005 Shropshire County Council election

The 2005 elections to Shropshire County Council (the final elections to the county council, before Shropshire became a unitary authority in 2009) took place on 5 May 2005, alongside the 2005 general election across the entire United Kingdom.

48 councillors were elected from 46 electoral divisions. The Conservatives had 6 net gains and took control of the council, which had previously been no overall control, with a majority of just 2. The Liberal Democrats also gained seats, whilst Labour lost seats, resulting in the Liberal Democrats becoming the second party. Three independent candidates were elected as councillors.

Boundary changes had occurred since the 2001 elections; the number of seats increased from 44 to 48.

== Results ==
Comparisons made against the results of the 2001 election.

Shropshire County Council election, 2005
Party	Seats	Gains	Losses	Net gain/loss	Seats %	Votes %	Votes	+/−
Conservative	25			+6	52.0			
Liberal Democrats	11			+3	23.0			
Labour	9			-2	19.0			
Independent	3			-3	6.0			
Conservative gain from No overall control								

Conservative majority: 2.
