= 1973 Kent County Council election =

Local election in England

- May 1973

All 102 seats to Kent County Council 52 seats needed for a majority
	First party	Second party	Third party
Party	Conservative	Labour	Liberal
Seats won	62	31	7
	Fourth party
Party	Independent
Seats won	2

Kent County Council held its elections in May 1973, as a part of the 1973 United Kingdom local elections, it was followed by the 1977 Kent County Council election.

This was the first election to the new Kent County Council after the Local Government Act 1972, with the council previously holding very different borders, powers and structure.

== Summary of 1973 results ==
Kent County Council Election Results 1973
Party	Seats	Gains	Losses	Net gain/loss	Seats %	Votes %	Votes	+/−
Conservative	62							
Labour	31							
Liberal	7							
Independent	2							

== Results by Division (A-Z) ==
=== Ashford No.1 ===
Ashford No.1
Party	Candidate	Votes	%
Conservative	M Pym	1,939	56.1
Labour	F Galler	1,520	43.9
Majority		419	12.2
Turnout		3459	33.9
Conservative win (new seat)			

=== Ashford No.2 (South East) ===
Ashford No.2 (South East)
Party	Candidate	Votes	%
Liberal	Ms G Haliburton	1,075	53.6
Conservative	C Boulden	509	25.4
Labour	M Wiggins	421	21.0
Majority		566	28.2
Turnout		2005	31.3
Liberal win (new seat)			

=== Ashford No.3 (South) ===
Ashford No.3 (South)
Party	Candidate	Votes	%
Labour	M Jackson	1,659	74.9
Conservative	G Langridge	557	25.1
Majority		1102	49.8
Turnout		2216	26.2
Labour win (new seat)			

=== Bridge-Blean No.1 ===
Bridge-Blean No.1
Party	Candidate	Votes	%
Conservative	L Shirley	2,500	61.9
Liberal	G Pearson	1,540	36.1
Majority		960	25.8
Turnout		4040	42.6
Conservative win (new seat)			

=== Bridge-Blean No.2 ===
Bridge-Blean No.2
Party	Candidate	Votes	%
Conservative	B Heddle	2,348	46.7
Liberal	A Payne	1,446	28.8
Labour	D Margrie	1,232	24.5
Majority		902	17.9
Turnout		5026	52.8
Conservative win (new seat)			

=== Broadstairs & St Peters No.1 ===
Broadstairs & St Peters No.1
Party	Candidate	Votes	%
Conservative	A Tucker	2,188	67.2
Labour	R Taylor	1,069	32.8
Majority		1119	34.4
Turnout		3257	40.0
Conservative win (new seat)			

=== Broadstairs & St Peters No.2 ===
Broadstairs & St Peters No.2
Party	Candidate	Votes	%
Conservative	F Amies	2,196	53.1
Liberal	P Dell	1,482	35.8
Labour	P Wood	457	11.1
Majority		714	17.3
Turnout		4135	46.0
Conservative win (new seat)			

=== Canterbury ===
Canterbury
Party	Candidate	Votes	%
Conservative	H Buckworth	4,039	42.1
Conservative	E Kingsman	3,648	38.0
Labour	Ms H Barber	3,444	35.9
Labour	A Walker	3,406	35.5
Liberal	Ms S Goulden	2,347	24.5
Liberal	R Seabourne	2,311	24.1
Turnout		9598	40.3
Conservative win (new seat)			
Conservative win (new seat)			

=== Chatham No.1 (Luton) ===
Chatham No.1 (Luton)
Party	Candidate	Votes	%
Labour	R Bean	2,093	65.0
Conservative	W Holloway	1,129	35.0
Majority		964	30.0
Turnout		3222	27.4
Labour win (new seat)			

=== Chatham No.2 (St Johns) ===
Chatham No.2 (St Johns)
Party	Candidate	Votes	%
Conservative	Ms B Walter	1,661	54.0
Labour	W Eastwick	1,413	46.0
Majority		248	8.0
Turnout		3074	28.1
Conservative win (new seat)			

=== Chatham No.3 (Christchurch) ===
Chatham No.3 (Christchurch)
Party	Candidate	Votes	%
Conservative	A Richardson	999	51.5
Labour	J Buck	939	48.5
Majority		60	3.0
Turnout		1938	27.9
Conservative win (new seat)			

=== Chatham No.4 ===
Chatham No.4
Party	Candidate	Votes	%
Labour	D Wheeler	1,622	59.3
Conservative	R Cox	1,114	40.7
Majority		508	18.6
Turnout		2736	28.3
Labour win (new seat)			

=== Cranbrook ===
Cranbrook
Party	Candidate	Votes	%
Independent	W Jempson	Unopposed	N/A
Majority		N/A	N/A
Turnout		N/A	N/A
Independent win (new seat)			

=== Dartford No.1 (Priory) ===
Dartford No.1 (Priory)
Party	Candidate	Votes	%
Labour	Ms S Brown	2,102	70.7
Conservative	Ms I Mucci	870	29.3
Majority		1232	41.4
Turnout		2972	33.5
Labour win (new seat)			

=== Dartford No.2 ===
Dartford No.2
Party	Candidate	Votes	%
Conservative	P Draper	2,601	54.9
Labour	B Clapham	2,135	45.1
Majority		466	9.8
Turnout		4736	38.4
Conservative win (new seat)			

=== Dartford No.3 ===
Dartford No.3
Party	Candidate	Votes	%
Labour	Ms L Wilson	2,033	56.0
Conservative	A Ripley	1,597	44.0
Majority		436	12.0
Turnout		3630	37.4
Labour win (new seat)			

=== Dartford Rural No.1 ===
Dartford Rural No.1
Party	Candidate	Votes	%
Independent	L Reeves	1,900	38.0
Labour	P Matthews	1,673	33.4
Conservative	B Nickels	1,433	29.6
Majority		227	4.6
Turnout		5006	42.3
Independent win (new seat)			

=== Dartford Rural No.2 ===
Dartford Rural No.2
Party	Candidate	Votes	%
Conservative	A Gillham	2,020	56.5
Labour	W Histon	1,554	43.5
Majority		466	13.0
Turnout		3574	43.7
Conservative win (new seat)			

=== Dartford Rural No.3 ===
Dartford Rural No.3
Party	Candidate	Votes	%
Conservative	A Barnes	2,955	62.9
Labour	G Amos	1,745	37.1
Majority		1210	25.8
Turnout		4700	38.1
Conservative win (new seat)			

=== Dartford Rural No.4 ===
Dartford No.4
Party	Candidate	Votes	%
Conservative	E Moore	1,154	54.7
Labour	G Nimmo	956	45.3
Majority		198	9.4
Turnout		2110	44.4
Conservative win (new seat)			

=== Deal No.1 ===
Deal No.1
Party	Candidate	Votes	%
Conservative	A Lawton	2,501	67.2
Labour	S Spears	1,222	32.8
Majority		1279	34.4
Turnout		3723	38.2
Conservative win (new seat)			

=== Deal No.2 ===
Deal No.2
Party	Candidate	Votes	%
Labour	B Golding	2,752	65.9
Conservative	A Greenway-Stanley	1,427	34.1
Majority		1325	31.8
Turnout		4179	42.8
Labour win (new seat)			

=== Dover No.1 (River) ===
Dover No.1 (River)
Party	Candidate	Votes	%
Labour	W Curtis	1,748	61.0
Conservative	Ms B Spencer	1,119	39.0
Majority		629	22.0
Turnout		2867	34.8
Labour win (new seat)			

=== Dover No.2 ===
Dover No.2
Party	Candidate	Votes	%
Conservative	H Morrison	1,828	53.9
Labour	G Bishop	1,566	46.1
Majority		262	7.8
Turnout		3394	38.9
Conservative win (new seat)			

=== Dover No.3 ===
Dover No.3
Party	Candidate	Votes	%
Labour	R Newman	1,910	53.8
Conservative	R Lock	1,642	46.2
Majority		268	7.6
Turnout		3552	44.0
Labour win (new seat)			

=== Dover Rural ===
Dover Rural
Party	Candidate	Votes	%
Conservative	E Sweatman	2,813	58.3
Labour	M Ellison	1,072	22.2
Independent	G Hackford	937	19.4
Majority		1741	36.1
Turnout		4822	41.4
Conservative win (new seat)			

=== East Ashford ===
East Ashford
Party	Candidate	Votes	%
Conservative	T Denne	2,694	76.4
Labour	D Smyth	832	23.6
Majority		1862	52.8
Turnout		3526	36.0
Conservative win (new seat)			

=== Eastry South ===
Eastry South
Party	Candidate	Votes	%
Labour	Ms P Leith	2,148	54.0
Conservative	Ms B Densham	1,832	46.0
Majority		316	8.0
Turnout		3980	41.1
Labour win (new seat)			

=== Elham ===
Elham
Party	Candidate	Votes	%
Conservative	L Roberts	1,949	53.1
Independent	G Boucher	1,721	46.9
Majority		228	6.2
Turnout		3670	39.0
Conservative win (new seat)			

=== Faversham ===
Faversham
Party	Candidate	Votes	%
Conservative	R Neame	2,349	50.6
Labour	L Vaughan	2,291	49.4
Majority		58	1.2
Turnout		4640	42.2
Conservative win (new seat)			

=== Folkestone No.1 ===
Folkestone No.1
Party	Candidate	Votes	%
Conservative	R Woodward	2,150	71.5
Labour	F Stockham	858	28.5
Majority		1292	43.0
Turnout		3008	29.9
Conservative win (new seat)			

=== Folkestone No.2 ===
Folkestone No.2
Party	Candidate	Votes	%
Labour	Ms M Johnson	2,024	55.4
Conservative	D Setterfield	1,477	40.4
Independent	H Button	153	4.2
Majority		547	15.0
Turnout		3654	34.3
Labour win (new seat)			

=== Folkestone No.3 ===
Folkestone No.3
Party	Candidate	Votes	%
Conservative	W Lawrence	2,657	71.0
Labour	J Sainsbury	1,087	29.0
Majority		1570	42.0
Turnout		3744	30.0
Conservative win (new seat)			

=== Gillingham No.1 ===
Gillingham No.1
Party	Candidate	Votes	%
Conservative	R Chamber	1,756	50.0
Labour	A Spells	1,754	50.0
Majority		2	0.0
Turnout		3510	34.3
Conservative win (new seat)			

=== Gillingham No.2 ===
Gillingham No.2
Party	Candidate	Votes	%
Labour	Ms M Ovenden	2,347	59.2
Conservative	D Baldwin	1,618	40.8
Majority		729	18.4
Turnout		3965	38.0
Labour win (new seat)			

=== Gillingham No.3 ===
Gillingham No.3
Party	Candidate	Votes	%
Conservative	J Spence	1,552	64.5
Labour	P Harriott	855	35.5
Majority		697	29.0
Turnout		2407	35.0
Conservative win (new seat)			

=== Gillingham No.4 ===
Gillingham No.4
Party	Candidate	Votes	%
Conservative	S Cox	1,816	57.9
Labour	G Clother	1,320	42.1
Majority		496	15.8
Turnout		3136	29.8
Conservative win (new seat)			

=== Gillingham No.5 ===
Gillingham No.5
Party	Candidate	Votes	%
Liberal	R Sayer	2,458	44.8
Conservative	L Shuter	2,125	38.7
Labour	C Spelman	903	16.5
Majority		333	6.1
Turnout		5486	39.2
Liberal win (new seat)			

=== Gillingham No.6 ===
Gillingham No.6
Party	Candidate	Votes	%
Labour	Ms P Harriott	1,832	64.2
Conservative	M Lewis	1,023	35.8
Majority		809	28.4
Turnout		2855	32.0
Labour win (new seat)			

=== Gravesend No.1 ===
Gravesend No.1
Party	Candidate	Votes	%
Conservative	C Jackson	1,980	51.2
Labour	G Laing	1,316	34.0
Liberal	B Isaac	574	14.8
Majority		664	17.2
Turnout		3870	40.0
Conservative win (new seat)			

=== Gravesend No.2 ===
Gravesend No.2
Party	Candidate	Votes	%
Labour	Ms G Batson	1,806	64.3
Conservative	Ms D Tyrrell	1,002	35.7
Majority		802	28.6
Turnout		2808	36.0
Labour win (new seat)			

=== Gravesend No.3 ===
Gravesend No.3
Party	Candidate	Votes	%
Labour	Ms L Baxter	1,669	49.6
Conservative	W Sutherland	1,049	31.2
Liberal	W Young	646	19.2
Majority		620	18.4
Turnout		3364	34.0
Labour win (new seat)			

=== Gravesend No.4 ===
Gravesend No.4
Party	Candidate	Votes	%
Labour	J Booker	2,529	65.8
Conservative	J Clarke	1,317	34.2
Majority		1212	31.6
Turnout		3846	40.0
Labour win (new seat)			

=== Herne Bay No.1 ===
Herne Bay No.1
Party	Candidate	Votes	%
Conservative	J Conyon	2,509	58.2
Labour	P Seymour	1,805	41.8
Majority		704	16.4
Turnout		4311	46.7
Conservative win (new seat)			

=== Herne Bay No.2 ===
Herne Bay No.2
Party	Candidate	Votes	%
Conservative	S Donnithorne	3,865	69.7
Labour	E Price	1,680	30.3
Majority		2185	39.4
Turnout		5545	46.9
Conservative win (new seat)			

=== Hollingbourn No.1 ===
Hollingbourn No.1
Party	Candidate	Votes	%
Conservative	S Burden	1,398	51.5
Liberal	E Burnett	1,317	48.5
Majority		81	3.0
Turnout		2715	33.5
Conservative win (new seat)			

=== Hollingbourn No.2 ===
Hollingbourn No.2
Party	Candidate	Votes	%
Conservative	R Pemberton-Leigh	2,114	72.4
Labour	P Bennett	804	27.6
Majority		1310	44.8
Turnout		2918	37.0
Conservative win (new seat)			

=== Hythe ===
Hythe
Party	Candidate	Votes	%
Conservative	D Thompson-Hall	2,978	69.8
Labour	M Butler	1,290	30.2
Majority		1688	39.6
Turnout		4268	44.1
Conservative win (new seat)			

=== Maidstone No.1 ===
Maidstone No.1
Party	Candidate	Votes	%
Labour	E Flood	Unopposed	N/A
Majority		N/A	N/A
Turnout		N/A	N/A
Labour win (new seat)			

=== Maidstone No.2 ===
Maidstone No.2
Party	Candidate	Votes	%
Liberal	E Marchesi	1,902	54.9
Conservative	L Baker	1,146	33.1
Labour	Ms R Silkin	416	12.0
Majority		756	21.8
Turnout		3464	41.6
Liberal win (new seat)			

=== Maidstone No.3 ===
Maidstone No.3
Party	Candidate	Votes	%
Liberal	Ms M Thomas	1,453	49.3
Conservative	Ms O Oxley	987	33.5
Labour	J Stringer	506	17.2
Majority		466	15.8
Turnout		2946	40.5
Liberal win (new seat)			

=== Maidstone No.4 ===
Maidstone No.4
Party	Candidate	Votes	%
Conservative	Ms D Lucy	2,139	58.3
Labour	A Tuffrey	1,531	41.7
Majority		608	16.6
Turnout		3670	38.4
Conservative win (new seat)			

=== Maidstone No.5 ===
Maidstone No.5
Party	Candidate	Votes	%
Liberal	C McKenna	1,898	39.1
Conservative	Ms F Simpson	1,599	33.0
Labour	G Nichols	1,353	27.9
Majority		299	6.1
Turnout		4850	42.7
Liberal win (new seat)			

=== Maidstone Rural No.1 ===
Maidstone Rural No.1
Party	Candidate	Votes	%
Conservative	M Nightingale	1,864	52.4
Liberal	G Threadgill	1,691	47.6
Majority		173	4.8
Turnout		3555	34.0
Conservative win (new seat)			

=== Maidstone Rural No.2 ===
Maidstone Rural No.2
Party	Candidate	Votes	%
Conservative	T Kemsley	1,910	57.6
Liberal	M Nash	1,406	42.4
Majority		504	15.2
Turnout		3316	30.5
Conservative win (new seat)			

=== Malling No.1 ===
Malling No.1
Party	Candidate	Votes	%
Conservative	K Funnell	1,480	40.7
Liberal	Ms E Fordham	1,391	38.2
Labour	A Walkiden	769	21.1
Majority		89	2.5
Turnout		3640	42.6
Conservative win (new seat)			

=== Malling No.2 ===
Malling No.2
Party	Candidate	Votes	%
Conservative	A Doran	2,727	56.3
Liberal	A Plazeck	1,410	29.1
Labour	K Payne	703	14.5
Majority		1317	27.2
Turnout		4840	41.4
Conservative win (new seat)			

=== Malling No.3 ===
Malling No.3
Party	Candidate	Votes	%
Liberal	V Ient	1,425	40.3
Conservative	L Ordish	1,342	38.0
Labour	S Bacon	766	21.7
Majority		83	2.3
Turnout		3533	36.3
Liberal win (new seat)			

=== Malling No.4 ===
Malling No.4
Party	Candidate	Votes	%
Conservative	E Sandford	1,481	55.0
Liberal	W Rogers	1,214	45.0
Majority		267	10.0
Turnout		2695	38.5
Conservative win (new seat)			

=== Margate No.1 ===
Margate No.1
Party	Candidate	Votes	%
Conservative	F Fox	2,050	42.9
Independent	W Kemp	1,160	24.3
Liberal	P Bloore	960	20.1
Labour	R Watts	610	12.8
Majority		890	18.6
Turnout		4780	43.8
Conservative win (new seat)			

=== Margate No.2 ===
Margate No.2
Party	Candidate	Votes	%
Conservative	Ms A Cobb	2,349	65.4
Labour	A Stockford	1,244	34.6
Majority		1105	30.8
Turnout		3593	37.1
Conservative win (new seat)			

=== Margate No.3 ===
Margate No.3
Party	Candidate	Votes	%
Labour	R Ward	2,404	58.8
Conservative	Ms S Trussell	1,681	41.2
Majority		723	17.6
Turnout		4085	35.9
Labour win (new seat)			

=== Margate No.4 ===
Margate No.4
Party	Candidate	Votes	%
Conservative	H Anish	3,103	69.9
Labour	Ms S Rowland	1,334	30.1
Majority		1769	39.8
Turnout		4437	38.7
Conservative win (new seat)			
