= 2000 Slough Borough Council election =

Local government election in England

← 1999	4 May 2000	2001 →

16 seats of 45 on council 23 seats needed for a majority
	First party	Second party	Third party
Party	Labour	Conservative	Liberal Democrats
	Fourth party	Fifth party
Party	Britwellian	Independent

The 2000 Slough Borough Council election was held on 4 May 2000, at the same time as other local elections across England. Fourteen of the 41 seats on Slough Borough Council were up for election, being the usual third of the council.

== Results ==
The elected councillors were:

Ward	Party	Elected	Term	Councillor
Baylis	Labour	2000	2003	George Henry Davidson
Britwell	Britwellian	2000	2003	Mavis Lilian Gallick * (a)
Central	Labour	2000	2003	Arvind Singh Dhaliwal
Chalvey	Labour	2000	2003	Sajidah Parveen Chaudhary
Cippenham	Labour	1995	2003	William Geoffrey Howard
Colnbrook & Poyle	Conservative	2000	2003	Dexter Jerome Smith
Farnham	Labour	1997	2003	Robert Anderson
Foxborough	Liberal Democrats	2000	2003	John William Edwards *
Haymill	Liberal	1987	2003	Richard Stanley Stokes * (b)
Kedermister	Labour	1997	2003	Donald Arthur Hewitt (c)
Langley St Mary's	Conservative	2000	2003	Derek Ernest Cryer (d)
Stoke	Liberal	2000	2003	James Moore * (e)
Upton	Conservative	1999	2003	Julia Thomson Long (f)
Wexham Lea	Independent	2000	2003	Michael Anthony Haines * (g)

Notes:-

- * Member of the Britwellian, Independent, Liberal and Liberal Democrat Group (BILLD) (after the 2000 election)
- (a) Gallick: Formerly served as a Labour councillor 1973–1979 and as a Liberal councillor 1983–1984
- (b) Stokes: Formerly served as a Labour councillor 1983–1986
- (c) Hewitt: Formerly served as a councillor 1975–1979 and 1984–1995
- (d) Cryer: Formerly served as a councillor 1967–1974
- (e) Moore: Formerly served as a councillor 1992–1996
- (f) Long: Formerly served as a councillor 1983–1990
- (g) Haines: Formerly served as a Labour councillor 1987–1991 and 1992–1998

=== Changes 2000–2001 ===
Ward	Party	Elected	Term	Councillor
Cippenham	Conservative	1995	2003	William Geoffrey Howard (a)

Note:-

- (a) Howard: Left the Labour Group in 2000 to become a Conservative member
