= 1998 Bristol City Council election =

1998 UK local government election

← 1997	7 May 1998	1999 →

22 of 68 seats (one third) to Bristol City Council 35 seats needed for a majority
	First party	Second party	Third party
Party	Labour	Liberal Democrats	Conservative
Seats won	46	16	6
Seat change	▼5	▲4	▲1
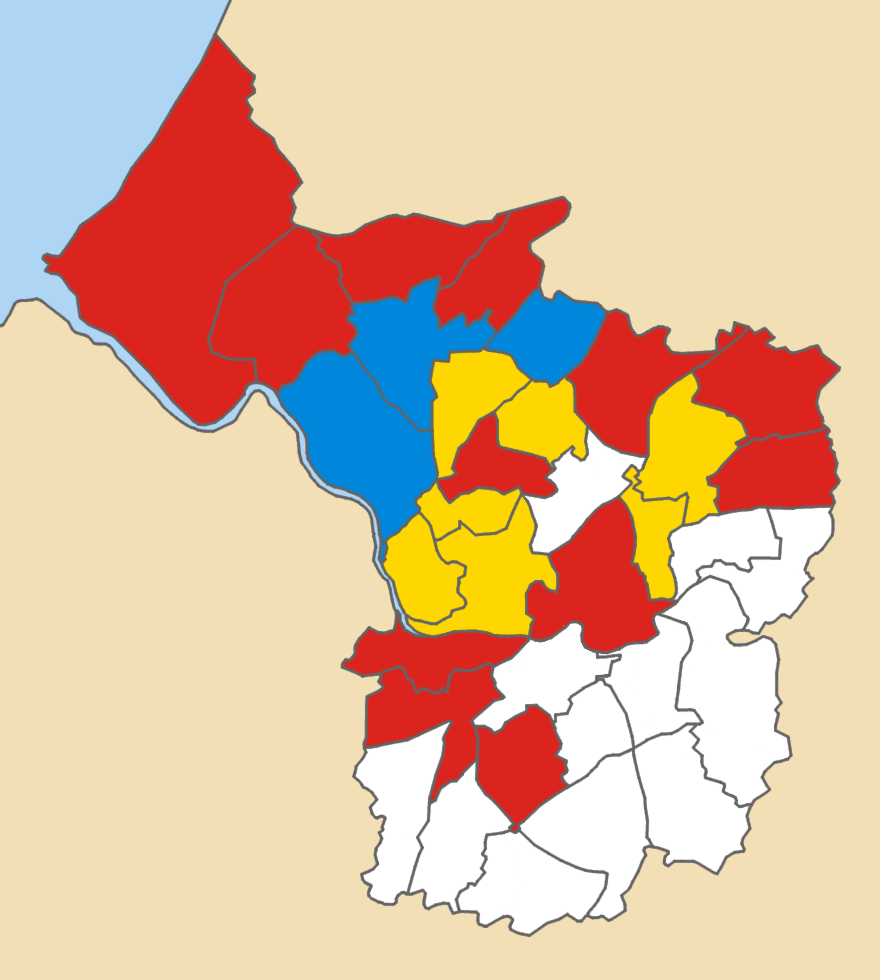
- 1998 local election results in Bristol
Council control before election
Labour
Council control after election
Labour

Elections to the Bristol City Council were held on 7 May 1998 as part of the 1998 United Kingdom local elections. 22 wards were contested.

== Results by ward ==
=== Avonmouth ===
Avonmouth
Party	Candidate	Votes	%
Labour	Celia Lukins	1,417	62.51
Conservative	Alastair Watson	541	23.86
Liberal Democrats	Paul Wakefield	263	11.60
Green	Lela McTernan	46	2.03
Majority		876	38.65
Turnout		2,272	30.74

=== Bedminster ===
Bedminster
Party	Candidate	Votes	%
Labour	Claire Warren	1,149	53.05
Conservative	Ian Henderson	477	22.02
Liberal Democrats	David Traube	331	15.28
Green	Graham Davey	209	9.65
Majority		672	31.03
Turnout		2,167	25.29

=== Bishopston ===
Bishopston
Party	Candidate	Votes	%
Liberal Democrats	David Gordon Kitson	1,429	40.86
Labour	Patricia McLaren	1,406	40.21
Conservative	Ian Kealey	493	14.10
Green	Christopher Sykes	169	4.83
Majority		23	0.65
Turnout		3,497	40.86

=== Cabot ===
Cabot
Party	Candidate	Votes	%
Liberal Democrats	Stephen Williams	1,027	53.46
Labour	Alison Wilson	456	23.74
Conservative	Ashley Fox	287	14.94
Green	Charles Bolton	103	5.36
Socialist Labour	Kay Carter	48	2.50
Majority		571	29.72
Turnout		1,925	18.25

=== Clifton ===
Clifton
Party	Candidate	Votes	%
Liberal Democrats	Barbara Janke	1,497	49.49
Conservative	Robert Marven	893	29.52
Labour	Alan Rogan	500	16.53
Green	David Woodgate	135	4.46
Majority		604	19.97
Turnout		3,030	29.78

=== Cotham ===
Cotham
Party	Candidate	Votes	%
Liberal Democrats	Colin Eldridge	1,112	39.64
Labour	Shelley Lanchbury	827	29.48
Conservative	Philip Cobbold	688	24.53
Green	Geoff Collard	178	6.35
Majority		285	10.16
Turnout		2,806	28.25

=== Easton ===
Easton
Party	Candidate	Votes	%
Liberal Democrats	Michael Smith	1,608	60.52
Labour	Balraj Sandhu	758	28.53
Socialist Labour	Vince Horrigan	109	4.10
Green	Aidan Knapp	97	3.65
Conservative	Craig Heeley	85	3.20
Majority		850	31.99
Turnout		2,659	35.34

=== Eastville ===
Eastville
Party	Candidate	Votes	%
Liberal Democrats	Anthony James Wood	1,199	41.29
Labour	David Sutton	1,052	36.23
Conservative	Ronald Hodges	499	17.18
Green	Robert Nicholls	79	2.72
Socialist Labour	Mark Baker	75	2.58
Majority		147	5.06
Turnout		2,908	32.58

=== Filwood ===
Filwood
Party	Candidate	Votes	%
Labour	George Micklewright	651	49.66
Liberal Democrats	Linda Hopkins	456	34.78
Conservative	Richard Carter	105	8.01
Socialist Alternative	Ian Marshall	99	7.55
Majority		195	14.88
Turnout		1,313	20.04

=== Frome Vale ===
Frome Vale
Party	Candidate	Votes	%
Labour	Alun Davies	1,589	48.80
Conservative	Timothy Collins	1,215	37.32
Liberal Democrats	Roland Potts	452	13.88
Majority		374	11.48
Turnout		3,264	35.87

=== Henbury ===
Henbury
Party	Candidate	Votes	%
Labour	Claire Cook	1,420	54.34
Conservative	Anthony James Smith	873	33.41
Liberal Democrats	Sylvia Young	320	12.25
Majority		547	20.93
Turnout		2,615	34.64

=== Henleaze ===
Henleaze
Party	Candidate	Votes	%
Liberal Democrats	Rosalie Brown	2,086	47.69
Conservative	Richard Eddy	1,758	40.19
Labour	Timothy Perfect	462	10.56
Green	Maxine Gilman	68	1.55
Majority		328	7.50
Turnout		4,379	47.93

=== Hillfields ===
Hillfields
Party	Candidate	Votes	%
Labour	Judy Patterson	1,077	53.42
Conservative	Barbara Jean Moore	498	24.70
Liberal Democrats	John Patrick Hassell	349	17.31
Socialist Labour	Roy Thomas	92	4.56
Majority		579	28.72
Turnout		2,019	25.32

=== Horfield ===
Horfield
Party	Candidate	Votes	%
Conservative	Martin Kerry	1,126	44.35
Labour	Arthur Massey	1,030	40.57
Liberal Democrats	Anthony Summerhayes	317	12.49
Green	Jade Bashford	66	2.60
Majority		96	3.78
Turnout		2,548	32.36

=== Kingsweston ===
Kingsweston
Party	Candidate	Votes	%
Labour	Rosemary Clarke	1,366	57.44
Conservative	John Goulandris	632	26.58
Liberal Democrats	Pamela Henderson	380	15.98
Majority		734	30.86
Turnout		2,382	33.49

=== Lawrence Hill ===
Lawrence Hill
Party	Candidate	Votes	%
Labour	Brenda Hugill	1,010	57.13
Liberal Democrats	John Astley	425	24.04
Conservative	Michael Cobb	179	10.12
Socialist Labour	Paul Williams	154	8.71
Majority		585	33.09
Turnout		1,777	20.67

=== Lockleaze ===
Lockleaze
Party	Candidate	Votes	%
Labour	Philip Gregory	1,103	57.03
Liberal Democrats	Ian Parry	536	27.71
Conservative	Richard Clifton	295	15.25
Majority		567	29.32
Turnout		1,942	27.03

=== Redland ===
Redland
Party	Candidate	Votes	%
Labour	John Ashton	1,357	39.10
Liberal Democrats	Sylvia Townsend	1,127	32.47
Conservative	Jack Lopresti	656	18.90
Green	Justin Quinnell	331	9.54
Majority		230	6.63
Turnout		3,476	35.62
