= 1997 Slough Borough Council election =

Local election in Slough

← 1996	1 May 1997	1999 →

41 seats (whole council) 21 seats needed for a majority
	First party	Second party	Third party
Party	Labour	Conservative	Liberal
Seats after	34	4	3

The 1997 Slough Borough Council election was held on 1 May 1997, at the same time as other local elections across England, and on the same day as the general election. All of the 41 seats on Slough Borough Council were up for election, rather than the usual third of the seats. This was in preparation for the local government reorganisation in Berkshire which saw Berkshire County Council abolished and its functions transferred to the six district councils, including Slough, with effect from 1 April 1998. The elections to Berkshire County Council which would ordinarily have been held in 1997 were cancelled.

The election left Labour with a large majority on the council, taking 34 of the council's 41 seats.

== Ward results ==
The elected councillors were:

Ward	Party	Elected	Term	Councillor
Baylis	Labour	1995	2001	Matloob Hussain
Baylis	Labour	1990	2000	L.S. Minhas
Baylis	Labour	1983	1999	K.S. Parhar
Britwell	Labour	1986	2001	Dennis McCarthy
Britwell	Labour	1995	2000	C.P. Walsh
Britwell	Labour	1994	1999	Geoffrey P. Cutting
Central	Labour	1988	2001	Ronald William Sibley
Central	Labour	1999	2000	M.S. Sihota
Central	Labour	1994	1999	M. Arif
Chalvey	Labour	1986	2001	Mrs L.A. Bussley
Chalvey	Labour	1979	2000	D.A. James
Chalvey	Labour	1996	1999	Mazahar Hussain
Cippenham	Labour	1996	2001	Lawrence L. Gleeson
Cippenham	Labour	1995	2000	William Geoffrey Howard
Cippenham	Conservative	1997	1999	A. Gregory
Colnbrook & Poyle	Labour	1997	2000	Robert Anderson
Colnbrook & Poyle	Conservative	1997	2001	Steven John Burkmar
Farnham	Labour	1997	2001	N. Lodhi
Farnham	Labour	1995	2000	Miss E.G. Rogers (a)
Farnham	Labour	1990	1999	David Edward Mansell (b)
Foxborough	Labour	1988	2001	Mewa Singh Mann
Foxborough	Labour	1994	2000	H.S. Ghatora
Foxborough	Labour	1991	1999	Gurbachan Singh Thind
Haymill	Liberal	1990	2001	David John Munkley *
Haymill	Liberal	1987	2000	Richard Stanley Stokes (c)
Haymill	Liberal	1997	1999	N.J. Ridley
Kedermister	Labour	1989	2001	M. Atkinson
Kedermister	Labour	1990	2000	B.L. Lopez
Kedermister	Labour	1981	1999	S.M. Thorpe
Langley St Mary's	Labour	1997	2001	Ronald John Webb
Langley St Mary's	Labour	1994	2000	K.I. Williams
Langley St Mary's	Conservative	1997	1999	Terrence W. Brennan
Stoke	Labour	1992	2001	O.E.M. Mansell
Stoke	Labour	1995	2000	Satpal Singh Parmar
Stoke	Labour	1997	1999	R.A. Din
Upton	Labour	1990	2001	Mark Drapes
Upton	Conservative	1997	2000	M.G. Long (d)
Upton	Labour	1996	1999	D. Thomas
Wexham Lea	Labour	1997	2001	John J. Connolly (e)
Wexham Lea	Labour	1996	2000	D.S. Dhillon
Wexham Lea	Labour	1997	1999	P.S. Sohal

Notes:

- (a) Rogers: Formerly served as a councillor 1983–1990
- (b) Mansell: Formerly served as a councillor 1983–1987
- (c) Stokes: Formerly served as a Labour councillor 1983–1986
- (d) Long: Formerly served as a councillor 1976–1995
- (e) Connolly: Formerly served as a councillor 1972–1976

=== Changes 1997–1999 ===
Ward	Party	Elected	Term	Councillor
Kedermister	Labour	1997	2000	Donald Arthur Hewitt (a)
Upton	Conservative	1999	2000	Julia Thomson Long (b)

Notes:-

- * Member of the Britwellian, Independent, Liberal and Liberal Democrat Group (BILLD) after the 2000 election.
- (a) Hewitt: Elected 7 December 1997 to fill a vacancy caused by the resignation of Mrs B.L. Lopez (Lab). Formerly served as a councillor 1975–1979 and 1984–1995.
- (b) Long: Elected 4 February 1999 to fill a vacancy caused by the death of M.G. Long (C). Formerly served as a councillor 1983–1990.

== By-election results ==
Kedermister By-Election 7 December 1997
Party	Candidate	Votes	%	±%
Labour	D.A. Hewitt	442	60.22	N/A
Conservative	Mrs M.E. Collins	206	28.07	N/A
Liberal Democrats	P.L. Bayliss	86	11.72	N/A
Majority		236	32.15	N/A
Turnout		4,858	15.11	N/A
Labour hold		Swing	N/A	

By-election cased by the resignation of Mrs B. L. Lopez (Labour).

Upton By-Election 4 February 1999
Party	Candidate	Votes	%	±%
Conservative	Mrs J.T. Long	799	59.85	N/A
Labour	B.B. Mittal	352	26.37	N/A
Liberal Democrats	Mrs S.A. Jenkins	68	5.09	N/A
	P.P. Whitmore	60	4.49	N/A
Independent Labour	D.A.J. Alford	36	2.70	N/A
Liberal	P.E. Bradshaw	20	1.50	N/A
Majority		447	33.48	N/A
Turnout		4,931	27.07	N/A
Conservative hold		Swing	N/A	

By-election caused by the death of M. G. Long (Conservative).
