= 1999 Slough Borough Council election =

Local election in Slough

← 1997	6 May 1999	2000 →

14 seats of 41 on council 21 seats needed for a majority
	First party	Second party	Third party
Party	Labour	Conservative	Liberal

The 1999 Slough Borough Council election was held on 6 May 1999, at the same time as other local elections across Britain. Fourteen of the 41 seats on Slough Borough Council were up for election, being the usual third of the council (13 seats) plus a by-election in Upton ward, where Labour councillor Mark Drapes had resigned.

== Ward results ==
The elected councillors were:

Ward	Party	Elected	Term	Councillor
Baylis	Labour	1999	2002	Gurmej Singh Sandhu (a)
Britwell	Labour	1999	2002	J.S. Dawson (b)
Central	Labour	1999	2002	Lydia Emelda Simmons (c)
Chalvey	Labour	1999	2002	E.E. Herbert
Cippenham	Conservative	1999	2002	A.P. Binns
Farnham	Labour	1990	2002	David Edward Mansell (d)
Foxborough	Labour	1999	2002	C. Sherma
Haymill	Liberal	1999	2002	M. Stoklosinski *
Kedermister	Labour	1999	2002	Joan Jones (e)
Langley St Mary's	Conservative	1997	2002	Terrence W. Brennan
Stoke	Labour	1999	2002	Simon Ashley George
Upton	Conservative	1997	2002	A. Gregory
Upton	Conservative	1999	2001	M.E. Collins (f)
Wexham Lea	Labour	1999	2002	Mohammed Latif Khan

Notes:-

- * Member of the Britwellian, Independent, Liberal and Liberal Democrat Group (BILLD) after the 2000 election.
- (a) Sandhu: Formerly served as a councillor 1996–1997
- (b) Dawson: Formerly served as a councillor 1988–1992 and 1996–1997
- (c) Simmons: Formerly served as a councillor 1979–1994
- (d) Mansell: Formerly served as a councillor 1983–1990
- (e) Jones: Formerly served as a councillor 1973–1979
- (f) Collins: Elected to fill a vacancy caused by the resignation of Mark Drapes (Lab)
