= 2002 Slough Borough Council election =

Local election in Slough

← 2001	2 May 2002	2003 →

14 seats of 41 on council 21 seats needed for a majority
	First party	Second party	Third party
Party	Labour	Britwellian	Conservative
	Fourth party	Fifth party
Party	Liberal	Independent

The 2002 Slough Borough Council election was held on 2 May 2002, at the same time as other local elections across England. Fourteen of the 41 seats on Slough Borough Council were up for election, being the usual third of the council (13 seats) plus a by-election in Stoke ward, following the death of Liberal councillor James Moore.

== Ward results ==
The results were:

Baylis ward
Party	Candidate	Votes	%	±%
Labour	Gurmej Singh Sandhu (Baggi Sandhu)	950	76%	
Conservative	Mohammed Jamil	301	24%	
Turnout		1251	21.96%	
Labour hold		Swing		

Baggi Sandhu had formerly served as a councillor 1996–1997.

Britwell ward
Party	Candidate	Votes	%	±%
Britwellian	Sean Patrick Wright	1,318	68%	
Labour	John Dawson	505	26%	
Conservative	John Schofield	104	5%	
Turnout		1927	30.15%	
Britwellian gain from Labour		Swing		

Sean Wright was a member of the Britwellian, Independent, Liberal and Liberal Democrat Group (BILLD). When the Britwellian party split later in 2002, Sean Wright joined the Independent Britwellian Residents party.

Central ward
Party	Candidate	Votes	%	±%
Labour	Lydia Emelda Simmons	1,459	66%	
Conservative	Eshaq Khan	756	34%	
Turnout		2215	33.88%	
Labour hold		Swing		

Lydia Simmons had formerly served as a councillor 1979–1994.

Chalvey ward
Party	Candidate	Votes	%	±%
Labour	Pervez Choudhry	922	53%	
Conservative	Shahib Khan	583	34%	
Liberal Democrats	Jagdeesh Singh	232	13%	
Turnout		1737	20.62%	
Labour hold		Swing		

Cippenham ward
Party	Candidate	Votes	%	±%
Labour	James Charles Robert Swindlehurst	1,223	49%	
Conservative	Peter Dale-Gough	1032	41%	
Liberal Democrats	Helen Edwards	255	10%	
Turnout		2510	26.86%	
Labour gain from Conservative		Swing		

Farnham ward
Party	Candidate	Votes	%	±%
Labour	David Edward Mansell (Dave Mansell)	874	70%	
Conservative	Paul Sutton	252	20%	
Liberal Democrats	Sarwan Singh Jhattu	126	10%	
Turnout		1252	23.11%	
Labour hold		Swing		

Dave Mansell had formerly served as a councillor 1983–1990.

Foxborough ward
Party	Candidate	Votes	%	±%
Labour	Jagjit Singh Grewal	679	41%	
Liberal Democrats	Duncan Buchanan	599	36%	
Conservative	Balwinder Singh Dhillon	364	22%	
Turnout		1642	39.09%	
Labour hold		Swing		

Haymill ward
Party	Candidate	Votes	%	±%
Liberal	Jean Frances Stockton	850	57%	
Labour	Earl Herbert	372	25%	
Conservative	Harvey Coward	267	18%	
Turnout		1489	22.76%	
Liberal hold		Swing		

Jean Stockton was a member of the Britwellian, Independent, Liberal and Liberal Democrat Group (BILLD) and had formerly served as a councillor 1992–1997.

Kedermister ward
Party	Candidate	Votes	%	±%
Labour	Christine Rita Small	737	60%	
Conservative	Glen Horn	377	31%	
Independent	Paul Whitmore	105	9%	
Turnout		1219	25.23%	
Labour hold		Swing		

Langley St Mary's ward
Party	Candidate	Votes	%	±%
Conservative	Terence W. Brennan (Terry Brennan)	868	52%	
Labour	Ruth Barber	810	48%	
Turnout		1678	29.68%	
Conservative hold		Swing		

Stoke ward
Party	Candidate	Votes	%	±%
Labour	Simon Ashley George	977	60%	
Labour	Egbert Christian Thomas	892	55%	
Liberal Democrats	Wisdom Da Costa	452	28%	
Liberal Democrats	Sonja Jenkins	439	27%	
Conservative	Evelyn Jenkins	204	12%	
Conservative	Ian Jenkins	159	10%	
Turnout		1633	29.4%	
Labour hold		Swing		
Labour gain from Liberal		Swing		

Egbert Thomas was elected to fill the vacancy caused by the death of Liberal councillor James Moore, and so was only elected to serve until James Moore's term of office would have otherwise expired in 2003.

Upton ward
Party	Candidate	Votes	%	±%
Labour	Sukhjit Kaur Dhaliwal	744	44%	
Conservative	Albert Gregory	715	42%	
Independent	Thomas King	239	14%	
Turnout		1698	31.54%	
Labour gain from Conservative		Swing		

Wexham Lea ward
Party	Candidate	Votes	%	±%
Independent	David Ian MacIsaac	918	47%	
Labour	Joan Jones	895	46%	
Conservative	Simon Moppett	131	7%	
Turnout		1944	32.66%	
Independent gain from Labour		Swing		

David MacIsaac was a member of the Britwellian, Independent, Liberal and Liberal Democrat Group (BILLD).

== By-election results 2002-2003 ==
Britwell By-Election 18 October 2002
Party	Candidate	Votes	%	±%
Britwellian	Patrick Shine	488	53.80	N/A
Labour	May Dodds	262	28.89	N/A
Britwellian	O. Isemia	157	24.92	N/A
Majority		226	32.15	N/A
Turnout		6,376	14.26	N/A
Britwellian gain from Britwellian		Swing	N/A	

By-election caused by death of Mavis L. Gallick (Britwellian).

Britwell By-Election 13 February 2003
Party	Candidate	Votes	%	±%
Britwellian	Paul Janik	539	63.49	+9.69
Labour	Ms J.R. Rock	310	36.51	+7.62
Majority		229	26.97	−5.18
Turnout		6,319	13.50	−0.76
Britwellian gain from Labour		Swing	N/A	

By-election caused by death of Dennis McCarthy (Labour).
