= 1997 Oxfordshire County Council election =

1997 UK local government election

The 1997 Oxfordshire County Council election took place on 1 May 1997 as part of the 1997 local elections in the United Kingdom. All 70 councillors were elected from 70 electoral divisions which returned one county councillors each by first-past-the-post voting for a four-year term of office.

== Division results ==
- Denotes sitting councillor

=== Abingdon Central ===
Abingdon Central
Party	Candidate	Votes	%	±%
Liberal Democrats	Julie Mayhew-Archer*	4,022	51.8	
Conservative	John Lightfoot	2,402	30.9	
Labour	Richard Thomas	1,124	14.5	
Green	Celia Warman	223	2.9	
Liberal Democrats hold		Swing		
Majority		1,620		
Turnout		7,771	78.8	

=== Abingdon North ===
Abingdon North
Party	Candidate	Votes	%	±%
Liberal Democrats	Janet Morgan*	3,293	52.5	
Conservative	Mary Lovatt	2,074	33.1	
Labour	Roberta Nichols	901	14.4	
Majority		1,219		
Turnout		6,268	80.2	
Liberal Democrats hold		Swing		

=== Abingdon South ===
Abingdon South
Party	Candidate	Votes	%	±%
Liberal Democrats	Neil Fawcett	1,978	43.5	
Conservative	Greta Drake	1,419	31.2	
Labour	Rosemary Banner	1,154	25.4	
Majority		559		
Turnout		4,551	75.7	
Liberal Democrats gain from Conservative		Swing		

=== Bampton ===
Bampton
Party	Candidate	Votes	%	±%
Conservative	Stephen Hayward	2,990	43.5	
Liberal Democrats	Brenda Smith	2,378	34.6	
Labour	Kenneth Rees	1,509	21.9	
Majority		612		
Turnout		6,877	79.3	
Conservative hold		Swing		

=== Banbury Easington ===
Banbury Easington
Party	Candidate	Votes	%	±%
Conservative	Kieron Mallon	1,984	39.5	
Liberal Democrats	Daphne Nash*	1,652	32.9	
Labour	Royston Mold	1,385	27.6	
Majority		332		
Turnout		5,021	77.8	
Conservative gain from Liberal Democrats		Swing		

=== Banbury Grimsbury ===
Banbury Grimsbury
Party	Candidate	Votes	%	±%
Labour	Sandra Mold*	2,042	46.3	
Conservative	Richard Tompkins	1,514	34.3	
Liberal Democrats	Pamela Linzey-Jones	857	19.4	
Majority		528		
Turnout		4,413	66.0	
Labour hold		Swing		

=== Banbury Hardwick ===
Banbury Hardwick
Party	Candidate	Votes	%	±%
Labour	Wendy Humphries*	1,738	47.6	
Conservative	Elsie Milne	1,223	33.5	
Liberal Democrats	Victor Burch	687	18.8	
Majority		515		
Turnout		3,648	69.6	
Labour hold		Swing		

=== Banbury Neithrop ===
Banbury Neithrop
Party	Candidate	Votes	%	±%
Labour	Margaret Ferriman*	1,607	41.3	
Conservative	Gary Wills	1,282	32.9	
Liberal Democrats	Geoffrey Fisher	1,003	25.8	
Majority		325		
Turnout		3,892	70.0	
Labour hold		Swing		

=== Banbury Ruscote ===
Banbury Ruscote
Party	Candidate	Votes	%	±%
Labour Co-op	John Steer*	2,375	64.0	
Conservative	Christopher Wardell	780	21.0	
Liberal Democrats	Anthony Burns	558	15.0	
Majority		1,595		
Turnout		3,713	68.3	
Labour Co-op hold		Swing		

=== Benson ===
Benson
Party	Candidate	Votes	%	±%
Conservative	Anthony Crabbe	1,842	43.9	
Liberal Democrats	Susan Cooper	1,544	36.8	
Labour	James Merritt	814	19.4	
Majority		298		
Turnout		4,200	77.2	
Conservative hold		Swing		

=== Bicester North ===
Bicester North
Party	Candidate	Votes	%	±%
Conservative	Douglas Spencer*	4,369	42.4	
Labour	Leslie Sibley	3,497	33.9	
Liberal Democrats	Elisabeth Yardley	2,082	20.2	
Independent Labour	Hector Cassidy	368	3.6	
Majority		872		
Turnout		10,316	75.7	
Conservative hold		Swing		

=== Bicester South ===
Bicester South
Party	Candidate	Votes	%	±%
Conservative	Charles Shouler*	1,251	40.3	
Labour	Michael Simpson	968	31.2	
Liberal Democrats	Catherine Bearder	882	28.4	
Majority		283		
Turnout		3,101	74.8	
Conservative hold		Swing		

=== Blackbird Leys ===
Blackbird Leys
Party	Candidate	Votes	%	±%
Labour	Atherton Stockford*	2,982	73.8	
Conservative	Paul Hernandez	484	12.0	
Liberal Democrats	Philip Keen	386	9.6	
Green	Patricia Dickson	189	4.7	
Majority		2,596		
Turnout		4,041	62.0	
Labour hold		Swing		

=== Bloxham ===
Bloxham
Party	Candidate	Votes	%	±%
Conservative	Keith Mitchell*	2,752	56.6	
Liberal Democrats	Colin Galloway	1,119	23.0	
Labour	James Plester	995	20.4	
Majority		1,633		
Turnout		4,866	80.2	
Conservative hold		Swing		

=== Burford ===
Burford
Party	Candidate	Votes	%	±%
Conservative	Donald Seale	2,317	51.0	
Liberal Democrats	Robert Duniplace	1,333	29.3	
Labour	Alison Bettle	895	19.7	
Majority		1,016		
Turnout		4,545	79.8	
Conservative hold		Swing		

=== Carterton ===
Carterton
Party	Candidate	Votes	%	±%
Conservative	Deirdre Bulley*	2,531	48.1	
Liberal Democrats	Peter Madden	1,504	28.6	
Labour	William Stevenson	1,224	23.3	
Majority		1,027		
Turnout		5,259	68.1	
Conservative hold		Swing		

=== Chalgrove ===
Chalgrove
Party	Candidate	Votes	%	±%
Liberal Democrats	David Turner*	2,529	54.3	
Conservative	Patricia Pritchard	1,395	30.0	
Labour	Sherwin Smith	730	15.7	
Majority		1,134		
Turnout		4,654	77.3	
Liberal Democrats hold		Swing		

=== Charlbury ===
Charlbury
Party	Candidate	Votes	%	±%
Labour	James Hodgson*	2,076	40.7	
Conservative	Robin Pacey	1,742	34.1	
Liberal Democrats	Gareth Epps	1,287	25.2	
Majority		334		
Turnout		5,105	83.8	
Labour hold		Swing		

=== Chinnor ===
Chinnor
Party	Candidate	Votes	%	±%
Conservative	Ann Davis*	2,265	50.9	
Labour	Ozanna Duffy	1,369	30.8	
Liberal Democrats	Mark McCartney	817	18.4	
Majority		896		
Turnout		4,451	78.1	
Conservative hold		Swing		

=== Chipping Norton ===
Chipping Norton
Party	Candidate	Votes	%	±%
Labour Co-op	Robert Evans	1,864	44.7	
Conservative	Judith Schroeder	1,408	33.8	
Liberal Democrats	Geoffrey Walton	678	16.3	
Green	Susan Chaple-Perrie	221	5.3	
Majority		456		
Turnout		4,171	76.7	
Labour Co-op hold		Swing		

=== Cumnor ===
Cumnor
Party	Candidate	Votes	%	±%
Conservative	Brian Hook*	2,557	44.1	
Liberal Democrats	John Woodford	2,375	41.0	
Labour	Brian Capaloff	864	14.9	
Majority		182		
Turnout		5,796	80.9	
Conservative hold		Swing		

=== Deddington ===
Deddington
Party	Candidate	Votes	%	±%
Conservative	Norman Matthews*	2,898	51.8	
Liberal Democrats	Peter Davis	1,489	26.6	
Labour	Gerard Sullivan	1,209	21.6	
Majority		1,409		
Turnout		5,596	80.1	
Conservative hold		Swing		

=== Didcot Manor ===
Didcot Manor
Party	Candidate	Votes	%	±%
Labour	Terence Joslin*	2,884	39.4	
Conservative	John Flood	2,643	36.1	
Liberal Democrats	Anthony Worgan	1,786	24.4	
Majority		141		
Turnout		7,313	76.7	
Labour hold		Swing		

=== Didcot Mereland ===
Didcot Mereland
Party	Candidate	Votes	%	±%
Labour	Neville Harris	1,808	50.5	
Conservative	Marie Flood	886	24.8	
Liberal Democrats	Andrew Jones	884	24.7	
Majority		922		
Turnout		3,578	68.9	
Labour hold		Swing		

=== Dorchester ===
Dorchester
Party	Candidate	Votes	%	±%
Conservative	Roy Tudor Hughes	1,624	36.8	
Labour	Malcolm Newdick	1,321	30.0	
Liberal Democrats	John Stimson	1,254	28.4	
Green	David Scott	210	4.8	
Majority		303		
Turnout		4,409	75.2	
Conservative hold		Swing		

=== Drayton ===
Drayton
Party	Candidate	Votes	%	±%
Labour	Margaret MacKenzie*	2,174	47.1	
Conservative	Amanda Harland	1,305	28.3	
Liberal Democrats	Richard Bosley	1,135	24.6	
Majority		869		
Turnout		4,614	80.3	
Labour hold		Swing		

=== Eynsham ===
Eynsham
Party	Candidate	Votes	%	±%
Liberal Democrats	Harry Wyatt*	2,647	48.3	
Conservative	Maureen Curry	1,564	28.5	
Labour	Michael Shelton	1,271	23.2	
Majority		1,083		
Turnout		5,482	80.1	
Liberal Democrats hold		Swing		

=== Faringdon ===
Faringdon
Party	Candidate	Votes	%	±%
Conservative	Judith Heathcoat	2,657	49.4	
Labour	Alan Hickmore	1,651	30.7	
Liberal Democrats	Brian Sadler	1,073	19.9	
Majority		1,006		
Turnout		5,381	76.7	
Conservative hold		Swing		

=== Goring ===
Goring
Party	Candidate	Votes	%	±%
Conservative	John Farrow	2,180	44.7	
Liberal Democrats	Bob Morgan*	2,147	44.1	
Labour	Claire Wadey	547	11.2	
Majority		33		
Turnout		4,874	81.0	
Conservative gain from Liberal Democrats		Swing		

=== Grove ===
Grove
Party	Candidate	Votes	%	±%
Liberal Democrats	Richard Marchant	1,913	44.2	
Conservative	Alfred Wolage	1,591	36.8	
Labour	Robert Sumner	821	19.0	
Majority		322		
Turnout		4,325	77.7	
Liberal Democrats hold		Swing		

=== Hanborough ===
Hanborough
Party	Candidate	Votes	%	±%
Conservative	David Dawes	1,967	41.6	
Liberal Democrats	Colin James	1,859	39.3	
Labour	Michael Enright	908	19.2	
Majority		108		
Turnout		4,734	82.9	
Conservative hold		Swing		

=== Headington ===
Headington
Party	Candidate	Votes	%	±%
Labour	Sylvia Tompkins*	1,814	42.4	
Conservative	Prudence Dailey	1,284	30.0	
Liberal Democrats	Rosemary Lawton Smith	982	22.9	
Green	Karen Gadsby	202	4.7	
Majority		530		
Turnout		4,282	64.1	
Labour hold		Swing		

=== Henley North ===
Henley North
Party	Candidate	Votes	%	±%
Conservative	George Sanders	1,751	51.0	
Liberal Democrats	Patricia Mulcahy	1,099	32.0	
Labour	Eva Barnes	586	17.1	
Majority		652		
Turnout		3,436	71.1	
Conservative hold		Swing		

=== Henley South ===
Henley South
Party	Candidate	Votes	%	±%
Conservative	Brian Ratcliffe Law	2,510	54.0	
Liberal Democrats	Bernard Cleasby	1,318	28.4	
Labour	Julie Wymer	819	17.6	
Majority		1,192		
Turnout		4,647	76.3	
Conservative hold		Swing		

=== Hinksey ===
Hinksey
Party	Candidate	Votes	%	±%
Liberal Democrats	Janet Godden*	2,707	48.8	
Conservative	Ann Dykes	1,799	32.4	
Labour	Richard Peirce	559	15.5	
Green	Anne-Marie Heslop	186	3.4	
Majority		908		
Turnout		5,251	78.1	
Liberal Democrats hold		Swing		

=== Hormer ===
Hormer
Party	Candidate	Votes	%	±%
Liberal Democrats	Robin Johnston*	1,950	54.4	
Conservative	Stephen Rathbone	1,264	35.2	
Labour	Gordon Richards	372	10.4	
Majority		786		
Turnout		3,586	79.7	
Liberal Democrats hold		Swing		

=== Iffley ===
Iffley
Party	Candidate	Votes	%	±%
Labour	Suppiah Segaran	1,820	42.8	
Conservative	James French	1,221	28.7	
Liberal Democrats	David Yeoward	655	15.4	
Green	Wendy Manley	555	13.1	
Majority		599		
Turnout		4,251	74.3	
Labour hold		Swing		

=== Kidlington North ===
Kidlington North
Party	Candidate	Votes	%	±%
Conservative	Jeremy Dempsey	1,530	33.3	
Labour	Vanessa Thomas*	1,511	32.9	
Liberal Democrats	John Wyse	1,360	29.6	
Green	Jane Carey	198	4.3	
Majority		19		
Turnout		4,599	75.7	
Conservative gain from Labour		Swing		

=== Kidlington South ===
Kidlington South
Party	Candidate	Votes	%	±%
Labour	David Green*	1,607	38.7	
Conservative	Maurice Billington	1,439	34.7	
Liberal Democrats	Anne Parsley	1,027	24.7	
Green	Richard Child	79	1.9	
Majority		168		
Turnout		4,152	78.3	
Labour hold		Swing		

=== Littlemore ===
Littlemore
Party	Candidate	Votes	%	±%
Labour	Olive Stedman	1,868	56.0	
Conservative	Andrew Allison	712	21.3	
Liberal Democrats	Vicky Potter	533	16.0	
Green	Joanna Lavender	225	6.7	
Majority		1,156		
Turnout		3,338	66.1	
Labour hold		Swing		

=== Marcham ===
Marcham
Party	Candidate	Votes	%	±%
Conservative	Marjorie Evans	1,861	45.2	
Liberal Democrats	Hilary Killick	1,440	34.9	
Labour	Thomas Long	820	19.9	
Majority		421		
Turnout		4,121	77.7	
Conservative hold		Swing		

=== Moreton ===
Moreton
Party	Candidate	Votes	%	±%
Liberal Democrats	Jan Morgan*	2,133	43.4	
Conservative	Patrick Greene	1,828	37.2	
Labour	Nicholas Hards	952	19.4	
Majority		305		
Turnout		4,913	80.3	
Liberal Democrats hold		Swing		

=== New Marston ===
New Marston
Party	Candidate	Votes	%	±%
Labour	Tom Richardson*	1,743	51.1	
Conservative	David Ruffels	815	23.9	
Liberal Democrats	Richard Gombrich	584	17.1	
Green	Robin Cotton	271	7.9	
Majority		928		
Turnout		3,413	72.7	
Labour hold		Swing		

=== Old Marston ===
Old Marston
Party	Candidate	Votes	%	±%
Labour	Nils Bartleet*	1,817	47.4	
Conservative	Margaret Whelan	1,021	26.7	
Liberal Democrats	Alan Edwards	835	21.8	
Green	Gregory Muttitt	157	4.1	
Majority		796		
Turnout		3,830	77.6	
Labour hold		Swing		

=== Oxford Central ===
Oxford Central
Party	Candidate	Votes	%	±%
Green	Sushila Dhall*	1,943	42.5	
Liberal Democrats	Philip Cockayne	1,056	23.1	
Conservative	Benjamin Holland	801	17.5	
Labour	Harini Iyengar	777	17.0	
Majority		893		
Turnout		4,577	70.9	
Green hold		Swing		

=== Oxford Cherwell ===
Oxford Cherwell
Party	Candidate	Votes	%	±%
Liberal Democrats	Thomas Snow	1,341	36.1	
Conservative	Janet Todd*	1,258	33.9	
Labour	Valeria Bartleet	853	23.0	
Green	Mary Zajicek	262	7.1	
Majority		83		
Turnout		3,714	73.8	
Liberal Democrats gain from Conservative		Swing		

=== Oxford East ===
Oxford East
Party	Candidate	Votes	%	±%
Labour	Robert Langridge	1,687	43.3	
Green	Elise Benjamin	956	24.6	
Liberal Democrats	Pieter-Paul Barker	671	17.2	
Conservative	John Lord	579	14.9	
Majority		731		
Turnout		3,893	67.1	
Labour hold		Swing		

=== Oxford North ===
Oxford North
Party	Candidate	Votes	%	±%
Liberal Democrats	Dermot Roaf*	1,953	47.8	
Labour	Parichehre Mosteshar-Gharai	781	19.1	
Conservative	Kenneth Bickers	726	17.8	
Green	Lilia Patterson	558	13.7	
Local Government Reform	John Rose	67	1.6	
Majority		1,172		
Turnout		4,085	72.3	
Liberal Democrats hold		Swing		

=== Oxford South ===
Oxford South
Party	Candidate	Votes	%	±%
Labour	Jennifer Karmali	1,649	38.1	
Green	Deborah Glass	1,198	27.7	
Conservative	Robert Porter	763	17.6	
Liberal Democrats	David Rundle	713	16.5	
Majority		451		
Turnout		4,323	69.9	
Labour hold		Swing		

=== Oxford West ===
Oxford West
Party	Candidate	Votes	%	±%
Labour	Fiona Campbell	1,337	33.1	
Liberal Democrats	Jeremy Wynne	1,079	26.7	
Green	Patrick Lingwood	825	20.4	
Conservative	Patricia Jones	799	19.8	
Majority		258		
Turnout		4,040	69.9	
Labour hold		Swing		

=== Ploughley ===
Ploughley
Party	Candidate	Votes	%	±%
Conservative	Catherine Fulljames*	3,176	52.6	
Labour	John Hunter	1,629	27.0	
Liberal Democrats	Antony Prowse	1,228	20.4	
Majority		1,547		
Turnout		6,033	75.7	
Conservative hold		Swing		

=== Quarry ===
Quarry
Party	Candidate	Votes	%	±%
Liberal Democrats	Margaret Godden	1,838	42.6	
Labour	Martin Broderick	1,418	32.8	
Conservative	Georgina Shomroni	883	20.4	
Green	Ylva Powlett	179	4.1	
Majority		420		
Turnout		4,318	69.8	
Liberal Democrats gain from Labour		Swing		

=== Shrivenham ===
Shrivenham
Party	Candidate	Votes	%	±%
Conservative	Anda Fitzgerald-O'Connor	2,236	42.5	
Liberal Democrats	Anthony Lambert*	1,790	34.0	
Labour	Marjorie Sandels	1,237	23.5	
Majority		446		
Turnout		5,263	77.9	
Conservative gain from Liberal Democrats		Swing		

=== Sonning Common ===
Sonning Common
Party	Candidate	Votes	%	±%
Conservative	Alan Robertson*	2,391	52.2	
Liberal Democrats	Robin Peirce	1,245	27.2	
Labour	Andrew Beere	697	15.2	
Green	Aidan Carlisle	249	5.4	
Majority		1,146		
Turnout		4,582	79.5	
Conservative hold		Swing		

=== St Clements ===
St Clements
Party	Candidate	Votes	%	±%
Green	Craig Simmons	1,972	39.3	
Labour	Biddy Hudson	1,630	32.5	
Conservative	David Timson	744	14.8	
Liberal Democrats	Richard Voyce	667	13.3	
Majority		342		
Turnout		5,013	69.4	
Green hold		Swing		

=== Temple Cowley ===
Temple Cowley
Party	Candidate	Votes	%	±%
Labour	Elizabeth Clements	1,800	51.2	
Conservative	Eric Lewis-Leaning	832	23.7	
Liberal Democrats	Elizabeth Cooper	655	18.6	
Green	Mary Kelsey	226	6.4	
Majority		968		
Turnout		3,513	66.8	
Labour hold		Swing		

=== Thame ===
Thame
Party	Candidate	Votes	%	±%
Conservative	Diana Ludlow	2,478	40.2	
Labour	John Beech	1,901	30.9	
Liberal Democrats	Paul Gleeson	1,783	28.9	
Majority		577		
Turnout		6,162	77.0	
Conservative hold		Swing		

=== Wallingford ===
Wallingford
Party	Candidate	Votes	%	±%
Liberal Democrats	William Bradshaw*	2,520	52.5	
Conservative	Nigel Moor	1,454	30.3	
Labour	Frederick Johns	822	17.1	
Majority		1,066		
Turnout		4,796	77.0	
Liberal Democrats hold		Swing		

=== Wantage ===
Wantage
Party	Candidate	Votes	%	±%
Liberal Democrats	James Moley	2,504	44.2	
Labour	Jean Nunn-Price	1,608	28.4	
Conservative	Charles Langton	1,553	27.4	
Majority		896		
Turnout		5,665	77.1	
Liberal Democrats hold		Swing		

=== Wantage Rural ===
Wantage Rural
Party	Candidate	Votes	%	±%
Conservative	Colin Lamont	1,867	41.9	
Liberal Democrats	Derek Southern*	1,667	37.4	
Labour	David Green	924	20.7	
Majority		200		
Turnout		4,458	79.9	
Conservative gain from Liberal Democrats		Swing		

=== Watlington ===
Watlington
Party	Candidate	Votes	%	±%
Liberal Democrats	Timothy Horton	1,958	43.5	
Conservative	David Sloan	1,879	41.7	
Labour	Clare Merritt	664	14.8	
Majority		79		
Turnout		4,501	77.9	
Liberal Democrats hold		Swing		

=== Wheatley ===
Wheatley
Party	Candidate	Votes	%	±%
Liberal Democrats	Patricia Anne Purse*	2,683	50.0	
Conservative	Peter Audley-Miller	1,697	31.6	
Labour	Michael Ormston	859	16.0	
Green	Mark Lynas	129	2.4	
Majority		986		
Turnout		5,368	76.1	
Liberal Democrats hold		Swing		

=== Witney North ===
Witney North
Party	Candidate	Votes	%	±%
Liberal Democrats	Brenda Churchill*	1,555	38.9	
Conservative	David Robertson	1,360	34.0	
Labour	John Ryall	1,084	27.1	
Majority		195		
Turnout		3,999	80.3	
Liberal Democrats hold		Swing		

=== Witney South ===
Witney South
Party	Candidate	Votes	%	±%
Labour	Edward Cooper	2,589	48.4	
Conservative	Anthony Harvey	1,715	32.1	
Liberal Democrats	Richard Willis	1,046	19.6	
Majority		874		
Turnout		5,350	76.4	
Labour hold		Swing		

=== Wolvercote ===
Wolvercote
Party	Candidate	Votes	%	±%
Liberal Democrats	Anne Baker	1,785	42.5	
Conservative	Simon Mort	1,052	25.0	
Labour	Sarah Escritt	885	21.1	
Green	Richard Jones	481	11.4	
Majority		733		
Turnout		4,203	78.1	
Liberal Democrats hold		Swing		

=== Wood Farm ===
Wood Farm
Party	Candidate	Votes	%	±%
Labour	David Buckley*	1,972	53.7	
Conservative	Philip Jones	787	21.4	
Liberal Democrats	Mark Hinnels	574	15.6	
Liberal	Roger Jenking	187	5.1	
Green	Simon Hunt	153	4.2	
Majority		1,185		
Turnout		3,673	68.9	
Labour hold		Swing		

=== Woodstock ===
Woodstock
Party	Candidate	Votes	%	±%
Liberal Democrats	David Nicholson	1,572	37.6	
Conservative	Louise Chapman	1,481	35.4	
Labour	Roderick Greatbatch	993	23.7	
Green	Bevis Cotton	139	3.3	
Majority		91		
Turnout		4,185	82.4	
Liberal Democrats gain from Conservative		Swing		

=== Wroxton ===
Wroxton
Party	Candidate	Votes	%	±%
Conservative	George Reynolds	2,710	55.8	
Labour	Elizabeth Gatliff	1,150	23.7	
Liberal Democrats	Richard Kaye	999	20.6	
Majority		1,560		
Turnout		4,859	81.7	
Conservative hold		Swing		

=== Wychwood ===
Wychwood
Party	Candidate	Votes	%	±%
Conservative	Rodney Rose	1,736	40.8	
Liberal Democrats	John Lilly	1,675	39.6	
Labour	Frances Ashworth	833	18.7	
Majority		51		
Turnout		4,244	81.5	
Conservative hold		Swing		

=== Yarnton & Otmoor ===
Yarnton & Otmoor
Party	Candidate	Votes	%	±%
Conservative	Barry Wood	1,969	40.2	
Liberal Democrats	Angela Lawrence	1,670	34.1	
Labour	Andrew Corner	997	20.4	
Green	Clifford Duffield	256	5.2	
Majority		299		
Turnout		4,892	79.7	
Conservative hold		Swing		
