= 2001 Slough Borough Council election =

Local election in Slough

← 2000	7 June 2001	2002 →

14 seats of 41 on council 21 seats needed for a majority
	First party	Second party	Third party
Party	Labour	Conservative	Liberal

The 2001 Slough Borough Council election was held on 7 June 2001, at the same time as other local elections across England and Northern Ireland, and on the same day as the general election. Fourteen of the 41 seats on Slough Borough Council were up for election, being the usual third of the council.

== Results ==
The elected councillors were:

Ward	Party	Elected	Term	Councillor
Baylis	Labour	2001	2004	Rajinder Singh Sandhu
Britwell	Labour	1986	2004	Dennis McCarthy
Central	Labour	1988	2004	Ronald William Sibley
Chalvey	Labour	2001	2004	Satpal Singh Parmar (a)
Cippenham	Labour	1996	2004	Lawrence L. Gleeson
Colnbrook & Poyle	Conservative	1997	2004	Steven John Burkmar
Farnham	Labour	2001	2004	Joginder Singh Bal
Foxborough	Labour	1988	2004	Mewa Singh Mann
Haymill	Liberal	1990	2004	David John Munkley *
Kedermister	Labour	1997	2004	Ronald John Webb
Langley St Mary's	Labour	2001	2004	Nigel Ian Rushby
Stoke	Labour	2001	2004	Raja Mohammad Zarait
Upton	Labour	2001	2004	Gurbachan Singh Manku
Wexham Lea	Labour	2001	2004	Muriel Douglas Gilmour

Notes:-

- Member of the Britwellian, Independent, Liberal and Liberal Democrat Group (BILLD)
- (a) Parmar: Formerly served as a councillor 1995–2000
