= 1989 Kent County Council election =

Local election in England

- 17 May 1989

All 99 seats to Kent County Council 50 seats needed for a majority
	First party	Second party	Third party
Party	Conservative	Labour	Social and Liberal Democrats
Seats won	55	25	18
Percentage	41.4%	29.5%	22.2%
	Fourth party
Party	SDP
Seats won	1
Percentage	1.8%

Kent County Council held its elections on 17 May 1989, as a part of the 1989 United Kingdom local elections, it was followed by the 1993 Kent County Council election.

== Summary of 1989 results ==
Kent County Council Election Results 1989
Party	Seats	Gains	Losses	Net gain/loss	Seats %	Votes %	Votes	+/−
Conservative	55					41.4		
Labour	25					29.5		
SLD	18					22.2		
SDP	1					1.8		
Green	0					4.3		
