= 2001 Halton Borough Council election =

2001 UK local government election

The 2001 Halton Borough Council election took place on 7 June 2001 to elect members of Halton Unitary Council in Cheshire, England. One third of the council was up for election and the Labour Party stayed in overall control of the council.

After the election, the composition of the council was:

- Labour 45
- Liberal Democrat 6
- Independent 3
- Conservative 1

== Results ==
6 new councillors were elected in an election where turnout was 56%.

Halton local election result 2001
Party	Seats	Gains	Losses	Net gain/loss	Seats %	Votes %	Votes	+/−
Labour	17			+3	89.5	65		
Liberal Democrats	2			-1	10.5	14		
Conservative	0			-1	0.0	17		
Independent	0			-1	0.0	3		
