= 1997 Bristol City Council election =

1997 UK local government election

← 1995	1 May 1997	1998 →

23 of 68 seats (one third) to Bristol City Council 35 seats needed for a majority
	First party	Second party	Third party
Party	Labour	Liberal Democrats	Conservative
Seats won	51	12	5
Seat change	▼2	▲3	▼1
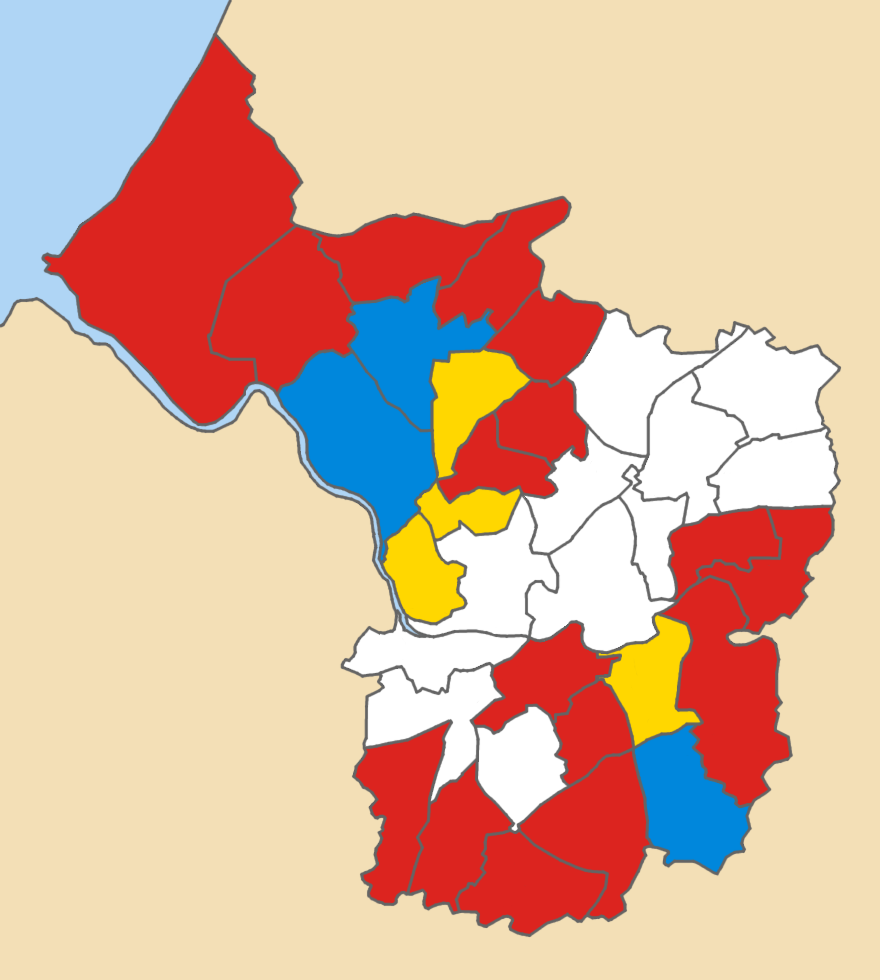
- 1997 local election results in Bristol
Council control before election
Labour
Council control after election
Labour

Elections to Bristol City Council were held on 1 May 1997.

== Results by ward ==
=== Avonmouth ===
Avonmouth
Party	Candidate	Votes	%
Labour	Ernie Bristow	3,363	59.03
Conservative	Frances Summers	1,462	25.66
Liberal Democrats	Paul Wakefield	770	13.52
Green	Lela McTernan	102	1.79
Majority		1,901	33.37
Turnout		5,711	76.62

=== Bishopston ===
Bishopston
Party	Candidate	Votes	%
Labour	Arthur Keefe	2,673	39.47
Liberal Democrats	David Gordon Kitson	2,224	32.84
Conservative	Ian Kealey	1,528	22.56
Green	Justin Quinnell	347	5.12
Majority		449	6.63
Turnout		6,791	75.01

=== Bishopsworth ===
Bishopsworth
Party	Candidate	Votes	%
Labour	Paul Crawford Walker	2,348	47.40
Conservative	Richard Eddy	1,962	
Liberal Democrats	Nicholas Doddrell	448	9.04
Green	Barrie Lewis	196	3.96
Majority		386	7.80
Turnout		4,963	70.14

=== Brislington East ===
Brislington East
Party	Candidate	Votes	%
Labour	Peter James Begley	2,928	43.74
Conservative	Ian Henderson	1,848	27.61
Liberal Democrats	Michael John Baker	1,343	20.06
Socialist Labour	Brian Corbett	487	7.28
Green	Martin Turnbull	88	1.31
Majority		1,080	16.13
Turnout		6,730	71.13

=== Brislington West ===
Brislington West
Party	Candidate	Votes	%
Liberal Democrats	Peter Main	2,558	40.86
Labour	Jane Painter	2,302	36.77
Conservative	Colin Bretherton	1,239	19.79
Green	Mary Beryl Wood	162	2.59
Majority		256	4.09
Turnout		6,278	47.78
Liberal Democrats gain from Labour		Swing	

=== Clifton ===
Clifton
Party	Candidate	Votes	%
Liberal Democrats	Brian Price	2,991	42.47
Conservative	John Bretten	2,278	32.34
Labour	Alun Davies	1,442	20.47
Green	David Woodgate	332	4.71
Majority		713	10.13
Turnout		7,062	66.52

=== Cotham ===
Cotham
Party	Candidate	Votes	%
Liberal Democrats	Geoffrey Jones	2,418	34.72
Conservative	Phillip Cobbold	2,069	29.71
Labour	Fabian Breckels	2,039	29.27
Green	Geoff Collard	439	6.30
Majority		349	5.01
Turnout		6,996	69.49

=== Hartcliffe ===
Hartcliffe
Party	Candidate	Votes	%
Labour	Mervyn Hulin	2,904	57.61
Conservative	Jack Lopresti	1,073	21.29
Liberal Democrats	Evelyn Elworthy	930	18.45
Green	Mary Elizabeth Thomson	134	2.66
Majority		1,831	36.32
Turnout		5,060	66.70

=== Henbury ===
Henbury
Party	Candidate	Votes	%
Labour	Richard John Pyle	3,047	54.00
Conservative	Anthony James Smith	1,741	30.85
Liberal Democrats	Sylvia Young	855	15.15
Majority		1,306	23.15
Turnout		5,664	74.01

=== Hengrove ===
Hengrove
Party	Candidate	Votes	%
Labour	Kelvin Blake	2,646	35.91
Liberal Democrats	Mary Sykes	2,375	32.23
Conservative	Steven Willis	2,253	30.57
Green	Charles Bolton	95	1.29
Majority		271	3.68
Turnout		7,377	74.93

=== Henleaze ===
Henleaze
Party	Candidate	Votes	%
Liberal Democrats	Dennis Hunter Brown	3,082	41.64
Conservative	Joyce Fey	2,981	40.27
Labour	Roger Livingston	1,130	15.27
Green	Richard Cook	209	2.82
Majority		101	1.37
Turnout		7,414	80.58

=== Horfield ===
Horfield
Party	Candidate	Votes	%
Labour	Kathleen Walker	2,538	44.64
Conservative	Martin Kerry	1,984	34.89
Liberal Democrats	Simon Young	1,022	17.97
Green	Donald Monck Brown	142	2.50
Majority		554	9.75
Turnout		5,700	72.74

=== Kingsweston ===
Kingsweston
Party	Candidate	Votes	%
Labour	John Bees	2,879	55.95
Conservative	Edward Ward	1,332	25.88
Liberal Democrats	Anthony James Wood	935	18.17
Majority		1,547	30.07
Turnout		5,162	72.18

=== Knowle ===
Knowle
Party	Candidate	Votes	%
Labour	Patricia Roberts	2,757	55.73
Conservative	Julian Hendy	1,110	22.44
Liberal Democrats	David Traube	850	17.18
Green	Graham Davey	230	4.65
Majority		1,647	33.29
Turnout		4,962	68.23

=== Redland ===
Redland
Party	Candidate	Votes	%
Labour	Rosalind Mitchell	2,540	34.78
Liberal Democrats	David Richer	2,467	33.78
Conservative	Michael Withers	1,837	25.15
Green	Christopher Sykes	460	36.30
Majority		73	1.00
Turnout		7.330	74.51

=== Southmead ===
Southmead
Party	Candidate	Votes	%
Labour	Jennifer Smith	3,117	59.19
Conservative	Anthony Burrell Orr	1,190	22.60
Liberal Democrats	Martyn Dunn	834	15.84
Green	Siobhan Campbell	125	2.34
Majority		1,927	36.59
Turnout		5,287	68.67

=== St. George East ===
St. George East
Party	Candidate	Votes	%
Labour	Margaret Shovelton	2,995	48.51
Conservative	Timothy Collins	1,773	28.07
Liberal Democrats	Gordon Draper	1,192	19.31
Socialist Labour	Roy Thomas Nurse	138	2.24
Green	Aidan Knapp	116	1.88
Majority		1,262	20.44
Turnout		6,199	72.53

=== St. George West ===
St. George West
Party	Candidate	Votes	%
Labour	Ronald Stone	3,010	55.67
Liberal Democrats	Kenneth Peacock	1,166	21.56
Conservative	George Burton	1,086	20.09
Socialist Labour	Paul Francis Williams	145	2.68
Majority		1,844	34.11
Turnout		5,427	68.21

=== Stockwood ===
Stockwood
Party	Candidate	Votes	%
Conservative	Colin Williams	3,422	45.99
Labour	Bridget Wilson	2,723	36.59
Liberal Democrats	Jane Mary Collins	1,075	14.45
Socialist Labour	Giles Shorter	120	1.61
Green	Maureen Arnaiz	101	1.36
Majority		699	9.40
Turnout		7,452	76.85

=== Stoke Bishop ===
Stoke Bishop
Party	Candidate	Votes	%
Conservative	Christopher Alderson	3,808	49.81
Liberal Democrats	Guy Adams	2,091	27.35
Labour	Jonathan Wyatt	1,534	20.07
Green	William McCaskie	212	2.77
Majority		1,717	22.46
Turnout		7,664	75.20

=== Westbury-on-Trym ===
Westbury-on-Trym
Party	Candidate	Votes	%
Conservative	Robert William Wall	3,585	53.25
Liberal Democrats	Edward Ward	1,819	27.02
Labour	John Waines	1,163	17.27
Green	Robert Nicholls	166	2.47
Majority		1,766	26.23
Turnout		6,745	80.96

=== Whitchurch Park ===
Whitchurch Park
Party	Candidate	Votes	%
Labour	Paul Smith	3,139	62.47
Conservative	Robert Rhys Morris	1,031	20.52
Liberal Democrats	Joseph McNamee	751	14.95
Green	John Mark Hills	104	2.07
Majority		2,108	41.95
Turnout		5,036	62.19

=== Windmill Hill ===
Windmill Hill
Party	Candidate	Votes	%
Labour	Christopher Orlik	3,426	52.44
Liberal Democrats	Gizella Gughes	1,142	17.48
Conservative	David Robert Morris	1,093	16.73
Green	Maxine Gilman	649	9.93
Socialist Labour	Robin Clapp	223	3.41
Majority		2,284	34.96
Turnout		6.546	66.28
