= 1977 Kent County Council election =

Local election in England

- May 1977

All 102 seats to Kent County Council 52 seats needed for a majority
	First party	Second party	Third party
Party	Conservative	Labour	Independent
Seats won	93	8	1

Kent County Council held its elections in May 1977, as a part of the 1977 United Kingdom local elections, it was followed by the 1981 Kent County Council election.

== Summary of 1977 results ==
Kent County Council Election Results 1977
Party	Seats	Gains	Losses	Net gain/loss	Seats %	Votes %	Votes	+/−
Conservative	93							
Labour	8							
Independent	1							
