= 1981 Kent County Council election =

Local election in England

- 2 May 1973

All 99 seats to Kent County Council 50 seats needed for a majority
	First party	Second party	Third party
Party	Conservative	Labour	Liberal
Seats won	64	23	10
	Fourth party
Party	Independent
Seats won	2

Kent County Council held its elections in May 1981, as a part of the 1981 United Kingdom local elections, it was followed by the 1985 Kent County Council election.

== Summary of 1981 results ==
Kent County Council Election Results 1981
Party	Seats	Gains	Losses	Net gain/loss	Seats %	Votes %	Votes	+/−
Conservative	64							
Labour	23							
Liberal	10							
Independent	2							
