= 1985 Kent County Council election =

Local election in England

- 2 May 1985

All 99 seats to Kent County Council 50 seats needed for a majority
	First party	Second party	Third party
Party	Conservative	Labour	SDP-Liberal Alliance
Seats won	57	24	18

Kent County Council held its elections on 2 May 1985, as a part of the 1985 United Kingdom local elections, it was followed by the 1989 Kent County Council election.

== Summary of 1985 results ==
Kent County Council Election Results 1985
Party	Seats	Gains	Losses	Net gain/loss	Seats %	Votes %	Votes	+/−
Conservative	57							
Labour	24							
Alliance	18							
