= 1997 Kent County Council election =

Local election in England

- 1 May 1997

All 84 seats to Kent County Council 43 seats needed for a majority
	First party	Second party	Third party
Party	Conservative	Labour	Liberal Democrats
Seats won	46	22	16

Kent County Council held its elections on 1 May 1997, as a part of the 1997 United Kingdom local elections, it was followed by the 2001 Kent County Council election.

Elections were held in all divisions across Kent, excepting Medway Towns for the first time, which had become a unitary authority.

== Summary of 1997 results ==
Kent County Council Election Results 1997
Party	Seats	Gains	Losses	Net gain/loss	Seats %	Votes %	Votes	+/−
Conservative	46							
Labour	22							
Liberal Democrats	16							
