= 1997 Northumberland County Council election =

1997 UK local government election

- 1 May 1997

All 66 seats to Northumberland County Council 34 seats needed for a majority
- Turnout: 71.8%
	First party	Second party
Party	Labour	Conservative
Last election	39	13
Seats won	43	13
Seat change	▲4	0
Popular vote	72,674	39,519
Percentage	44.8%	24.4%
	Third party	Fourth party
Party	Liberal Democrats	Independent
Last election	11	3
Seats won	8	2
Seat change	▼3	▼1
Popular vote	42,219	6,040
Percentage	26.0%	3.7%
- Map of the results of the 1997 local election.
Control of Council before election
Labour Party
Control of Council after election
Labour Party

Local elections to Northumberland County Council, a county council in the north east of England, were held on 1 May 1997, resulting in a council with Labour members forming a majority.

== Results ==
Northumberland County Council election, 1997
Party	Seats	Gains	Losses	Net gain/loss	Seats %	Votes %	Votes	+/−
Labour	43			▲4	65.2	44.8	72,674	▲7.4
Conservative	13			0	19.7	24.4	39,519	▼3.5
Liberal Democrats	8			▼3	12.1	26.0	42,219	▼2.8
Independent	2			▼3	3.0	3.7	6,040	▼1.3
Green	0			0	0.0	0.7	1,150	▼0.2
Liberal	0			0	0.0	0.4	608	New
