= 2001 Wokingham District Council election =

2001 UK local government election

The 2001 Wokingham District Council election took place on 7 June 2001 to elect members of Wokingham Unitary Council in Berkshire, England. One third of the council was up for election and the council stayed under no overall control.

The previous election in 2000 saw both the Conservatives and Liberal Democrats win 27 seats. The Liberal Democrats took control of the administration 2 months later after one of the Conservative councillors, Nigel Rose, abstained enabling the Liberal Democrats to get the mayor's casting vote.

The results of the 2001 election saw no change with both main parties remaining on the same number of seats. Overall turnout was significantly increased at 63.75% due to the election being held at the same time as the 2001 general election.

After the election, the composition of the council was:

- Conservative 27
- Liberal Democrat 27

== Election result ==
Wokingham local election result 2001
Party	Seats	Gains	Losses	Net gain/loss	Seats %	Votes %	Votes	+/−
Conservative	9	0	0	0	50.0	42.5	26,359	-6.0%
Liberal Democrats	9	0	0	0	50.0	39.9	24,749	-1.8%
Labour	0	0	0	0	0	17.1	10,596	+8.0%
Green	0	0	0	0	0	0.4	278	+0.4%
Independent	0	0	0	0	0	0.1	76	+0.1%

== Ward results ==
Bulmershe
Party	Candidate	Votes	%	±%
Liberal Democrats	Sellam Rahmouni	715	36.7	−10.7
Labour	Nelson Bland	701	35.9	+3.3
Conservative	Robert Wood	534	27.4	+7.4
Majority		14	0.8	−14.0
Turnout		1,950	64.0	
Liberal Democrats hold		Swing		

Charvil
Party	Candidate	Votes	%	±%
Conservative	Pamela Graddon	713	47.7	
Liberal Democrats	John Saunders	541	36.2	
Labour	Christofer Hall	241	16.1	
Majority		172	11.5	
Turnout		1,495	68.9	
Conservative hold		Swing		

Coronation
Party	Candidate	Votes	%	±%
Liberal Democrats	Terence Dredge	1,854	47.8	+0.2
Conservative	Susan Doughty	1,477	38.1	−7.4
Labour	Ian Hills	545	14.1	+7.2
Majority		377	9.7	+7.6
Turnout		3,876	66.9	+32.3
Liberal Democrats hold		Swing		

Emmbrook
Party	Candidate	Votes	%	±%
Liberal Democrats	Keith Malvern	1,508	46.9	
Conservative	Dennis Carver	1,334	41.5	
Labour	John Baker	376	11.7	
Majority		174	5.4	
Turnout		3,218	68.3	+30.4
Liberal Democrats hold		Swing		

Evendons
Party	Candidate	Votes	%	±%
Conservative	Dianne King	2,539	46.0	−0.6
Liberal Democrats	Nicholas Wright	2,326	42.1	−5.0
Labour	Paul French	659	11.9	+5.7
Majority		213	3.9	
Turnout		5,524	66.0	+41.5
Conservative hold		Swing		

Finchampstead North
Party	Candidate	Votes	%	±%
Conservative	Tim Charlesworth	1,622	52.8	+5.6
Liberal Democrats	Celia May	1,449	47.2	−5.6
Majority		173	5.6	
Turnout		3,071	68.1	
Conservative hold		Swing		

Hurst
Party	Candidate	Votes	%	±%
Conservative	Annette Drake	702	71.1	
Liberal Democrats	Patrick Hull	186	18.8	
Labour	Stuart Crainer	100	10.1	
Majority		516	52.3	
Turnout		988	66.8	
Conservative hold		Swing		

Little Hungerford
Party	Candidate	Votes	%	±%
Liberal Democrats	David Swindells	2,278	43.9	−3.5
Conservative	Christopher Edmunds	2,001	38.6	−5.0
Labour	Jacqueline Rupert	907	17.5	+8.6
Majority		277	5.3	+1.5
Turnout		5,186	63.7	+36.0
Liberal Democrats hold		Swing		

Loddon
Party	Candidate	Votes	%	±%
Liberal Democrats	Alan Clifford	1,605	41.9	−9.2
Conservative	Kathleen Henderson	1,294	33.8	−2.8
Labour	Janice Kite	932	24.3	+12.1
Majority		311	8.1	−6.4
Turnout		3,831	60.1	+41.2
Liberal Democrats hold		Swing		

Norreys
Party	Candidate	Votes	%	±%
Conservative	Iain Brown	2,053	50.9	−14.8
Liberal Democrats	Michael Harper	1,108	27.4	+12.6
Labour	Paul Sharples	876	21.7	+2.2
Majority		945	23.5	−22.7
Turnout		4,037	64.9	+35.0
Conservative hold		Swing		

Redhatch
Party	Candidate	Votes	%	±%
Liberal Democrats	David Hare	3,284	45.4	−5.4
Conservative	Norman Jorgensen	2,558	35.4	+1.6
Labour	Susan Salts	1,038	14.3	+6.0
Green	Mark Broad	278	3.8	+3.8
Independent	Colin Forrestal	76	1.1	+1.1
Majority		726	10.0	−7.0
Turnout		7,234	59.4	+38.4
Liberal Democrats hold		Swing		

Shinfield
Party	Candidate	Votes	%	±%
Conservative	Malcolm Bryant	1,857	52.4	−8.9
Liberal Democrats	John Shockley	917	25.9	−1.1
Labour	Owen Waite	772	21.8	+10.1
Majority		940	26.5	−7.8
Turnout		3,546	60.1	+37.0
Conservative hold		Swing		

South Lake
Party	Candidate	Votes	%	±%
Liberal Democrats	Coling Lawley	1,407	51.2	−5.3
Conservative	Gerald Pett	688	25.0	−5.4
Labour	David Kay	653	23.8	+10.7
Majority		719	26.2	+0.1
Turnout		2,748	59.0	+39.4
Liberal Democrats hold		Swing		

Twyford & Ruscombe
Party	Candidate	Votes	%	±%
Liberal Democrats	Stephen Conway	2,203	57.2	−1.1
Conservative	Gerald Garnett	1,235	32.1	−1.1
Labour	Roy Mantel	412	10.7	+2.2
Majority		968	25.1	0.0
Turnout		3,850	66.8	+27.8
Liberal Democrats hold		Swing		

Wescott
Party	Candidate	Votes	%	±%
Conservative	Robert Wyatt	1,261	49.7	−6.0
Liberal Democrats	Peter Evans	942	37.1	+3.6
Labour	John Woodward	333	13.1	+2.3
Majority		319	12.6	−9.6
Turnout		2,536	65.0	+35.2
Conservative hold		Swing		

Whitegates
Party	Candidate	Votes	%	±%
Liberal Democrats	Jennifer Lissaman	976	48.5	−5.5
Labour	Pippa White	534	26.5	+2.2
Conservative	Paul Swaddle	503	25.0	+3.4
Majority		442	22.0	−7.7
Turnout		2,013	67.5	+32.9
Liberal Democrats hold		Swing		

Winnersh
Party	Candidate	Votes	%	±%
Conservative	Elizabeth Siggery	1,807	49.2	+1.6
Liberal Democrats	David Glover	1,450	39.5	−8.4
Labour	Elizabeth Vincent	413	11.3	+6.8
Majority		357	9.7	
Turnout		3,670	62.7	+31.8
Conservative hold		Swing		

Wokingham Without
Party	Candidate	Votes	%	±%
Conservative	Pauline Helliar-Symons	2,181	66.4	−6.2
Labour	Rosemary Chapman	1,104	33.6	+18.6
Majority		1,077	32.8	−24.8
Turnout		3,285	61.9	+35.1
Conservative hold		Swing		
