= 1993 Kent County Council election =

Local election in England

- 6 May 1993

All 99 seats to Kent County Council 50 seats needed for a majority
	First party	Second party	Third party
Party	Conservative	Labour	Liberal Democrats
Seats won	41	30	28
Percentage	36.4%	30.4%	31.7%

Kent County Council held its elections on 6 May 1993, as a part of the 1993 United Kingdom local elections, it was followed by the 1997 Kent County Council election.

The result allowed for the Labour Party and Liberal Democrats to form a local government.

== Summary of 1993 results ==
Kent County Council Election Results 1993
Party	Seats	Gains	Losses	Net gain/loss	Seats %	Votes %	Votes	+/−
Conservative	41					36.4		
Labour	30					30.4		
Liberal Democrats	28					31.7		
Green	0					0.9		
