= 2001 Shropshire County Council election =

2001 UK local government election

The 2001 elections to Shropshire County Council took place on 7 June 2001.

The Labour Party increased its number of councillors at the expense of the Conservatives and Liberal Democrats. The council remained no overall control however.

No boundary changes had occurred since the 1997 elections.

== Results ==
Shropshire County Council election, 2001
Party	Seats	Gains	Losses	Net gain/loss	Seats %	Votes %	Votes	+/−
Conservative	17			-4				
Labour	11			+5				
Liberal Democrats	9			-2				
Other parties	5			+5				
Independent	2			-4				
