= 2001 Kent County Council election =

- 7 June 2001

All 84 seats to Kent County Council 43 seats needed for a majority
	First party	Second party	Third party
Leader	Sandy Bruce-Lockhart
Party	Conservative	Labour	Liberal Democrats
Seats won	52	22	10
Seat change	▲6	Steady	▼6
Leader before election
Sandy Bruce-Lockhart
Conservative
Elected Leader
Sandy Bruce-Lockhart
Conservative

Kent County Council held its elections on 7 June 2001, on the same day as the 2001 United Kingdom general election. They were followed by the 2005 Kent County Council election.

Elections were held in all divisions across Kent, excepting Medway Towns which is a unitary authority.

== Summary of 2001 results ==
Kent County Council Election Results 2001
Party	Seats	Gains	Losses	Net gain/loss	Seats %	Votes %	Votes	+/−
Conservative	52			+6				
Labour	22			0				
Liberal Democrats	10			-6				
