= 2005 Craigavon Borough Council election =

Local government election in Northern Ireland

| ← 2001 | 5 May 2005 | 2011 → |

All 26 seats to Craigavon Borough Council 14 seats needed for a majority
| | First party | Second party | Third party |
|---|---|---|---|
| Party | DUP | UUP | Sinn Féin |
| Seats won | 9 | 6 | 6 |
| Seat change | ▲3 | ▼2 | ▲2 |
| | Fourth party | Fifth party |
| Party | SDLP | Independent |
| Seats won | 4 | 1 |
| Seat change | ▼3 | 0 |
- Party with the most votes by district.

Elections to Craigavon Borough Council were held on 5 May 2005 on the same day as the other Northern Irish local government elections. The election used four district electoral areas to elect a total of 26 councillors.

== Election results ==
Craigavon Borough Council Election Result 2005
| Party | Seats | Gains | Losses | Net gain/loss | Seats % | Votes % | Votes | +/− |
|---|---|---|---|---|---|---|---|---|
| DUP | 9 | 3 | 0 | ▲3 | 34.6 | 30.8 | 10,631 | ▲8.2 |
| UUP | 6 | 0 | 2 | ▼2 | 23.1 | 22.8 | 7,882 | ▼5.3 |
| Sinn Féin | 6 | 2 | 0 | ▲2 | 23.1 | 22.4 | 7,732 | ▲1.1 |
| SDLP | 4 | 0 | 3 | ▼3 | 15.4 | 16.9 | 5,849 | ▼3.1 |
| Independent | 1 | 0 | 0 | 0 | 3.8 | 4.2 | 1,459 | ▼0.7 |
| Alliance | 0 | 0 | 0 | 0 | 0.0 | 2.4 | 814 | ▲0.8 |
| Workers' Party | 0 | 0 | 0 | 0 | 0.0 | 0.4 | 155 | ▲0.1 |

Note: "Votes" are the first preference votes.

== Districts summary ==
Results of the Craigavon Borough Council election, 2005 by district
| Ward | % | Cllrs | % | Cllrs | % | Cllrs | % | Cllrs | % | Cllrs | % | Cllrs | Total Cllrs |
| Ward | DUP | | UUP | | Sinn Féin | | SDLP | | Alliance | | Others | | Total Cllrs |
|---|---|---|---|---|---|---|---|---|---|---|---|---|---|
| Central | 33.4 | 3 | 26.7 | 2 | 20.4 | 1 | 13.2 | 1 | 6.4 | 0 | 0.0 | 0 | 7 |
| Loughside | 4.0 | 0 | 4.1 | 0 | 50.5 | 3 | 39.3 | 2 | 0.0 | 0 | 2.1 | 0 | 5 |
| Lurgan | 39.4 | 3 | 40.2 | 3 | 7.5 | 0 | 6.5 | 0 | 0.0 | 0 | 6.4 | 0 | 7 |
| Portadown | 42.5 | 3 | 14.5 | 1 | 16.5 | 1 | 13.2 | 1 | 2.7 | 0 | 10.6 | 1 | 7 |
| Total | 30.8 | 9 | 22.8 | 6 | 22.4 | 6 | 16.9 | 4 | 2.4 | 0 | 4.7 | 0 | 26 |

== District results ==
=== Central ===
2001: 2 x DUP, 2 x UUP, 2 x SDLP, 1 x Sinn Féin
2005: 3 x DUP, 2 x UUP, 1 x Sinn Féin, 1 x SDLP
2001–2005 Change: DUP gain from SDLP

Central - 7 seats
| Party | Candidate | FPv% | Count | | | | | | | | |
| Party | Candidate | FPv% | 1 | 2 | 3 | 4 | 5 | 6 | 7 | 8 | 9 |
|---|---|---|---|---|---|---|---|---|---|---|---|
| DUP | Robert Smith* | 16.88% | 1,587 | | | | | | | | |
| UUP | Kenneth Twyble* | 13.91% | 1,308 | | | | | | | | |
| Sinn Féin | John O'Dowd* | 13.07% | 1,229 | | | | | | | | |
| DUP | William Smith* | 9.87% | 928 | 1,280.82 | | | | | | | |
| UUP | Ronald Harkness | 5.58% | 525 | 527.08 | 580.68 | 710.82 | 713.48 | 714.94 | 1,147.57 | 1,411.57 | |
| SDLP | Kieran Corr* | 8.38% | 788 | 788 | 788.9 | 792 | 792 | 1,147.1 | 1,157.2 | 1,318.2 | |
| DUP | Philip Weir | 6.61% | 622 | 666.72 | 674.82 | 744.46 | 830.77 | 831.87 | 859.2 | 912.81 | 998.81 |
| Sinn Féin | Francis Murray* | 7.37% | 693 | 693 | 693.1 | 694.1 | 694.1 | 740.1 | 743.1 | 772.6 | 778.6 |
| Alliance | Alan Castle | 6.36% | 598 | 599.3 | 606.3 | 615.36 | 616.34 | 646.8 | 666.86 | | |
| UUP | Frederick Crowe* | 4.48% | 421 | 423.6 | 452.1 | 517.92 | 520.02 | 522.02 | | | |
| SDLP | Patricia Mallon* | 4.79% | 450 | 450.52 | 451.12 | 451.22 | 451.29 | | | | |
| UUP | Robert Oliver | 2.70% | 254 | 259.72 | 289.72 | | | | | | |
Electorate: 15,519 Valid: 9,403 (60.59%) Spoilt: 230 Quota: 1,176 Turnout: 9,633 (62.07%)

=== Loughside ===
2001: 3 x SDLP, 2 x Sinn Féin
2005: 3 x Sinn Féin, 2 x SDLP
2001–2005 Change: Sinn Féin gain from SDLP

Loughside - 5 seats
| Party | Candidate | FPv% | Count | | | |
| Party | Candidate | FPv% | 1 | 2 | 3 | 4 |
|---|---|---|---|---|---|---|
| Sinn Féin | Mairéad O'Dowd | 29.17% | 2,183 | | | |
| SDLP | Dolores Kelly* | 21.71% | 1,625 | | | |
| Sinn Féin | Leah Small | 8.67% | 649 | 1,263.24 | | |
| SDLP | Mary McAlinden* | 8.50% | 636 | 736.76 | 944.36 | 1,178.72 |
| Sinn Féin | Michael Tallon | 12.67% | 948 | 1,092.32 | 1,108.88 | 1,153.6 |
| SDLP | Anthony Elliott | 9.09% | 680 | 719.16 | 842.52 | 994 |
| UUP | Joy Savage | 4.09% | 306 | 309.52 | 313.84 | |
| DUP | Ivan Russell | 4.04% | 302 | 302.44 | 302.92 | |
| Workers' Party | Tom French | 2.07% | 155 | 185.36 | 205.52 | |
Electorate: 12,354 Valid: 7,484 (60.58%) Spoilt: 228 Quota: 1,248 Turnout: 7,712 (62.43%)

=== Lurgan ===
2001: 4 x UUP, 2 x DUP, 1 x SDLP
2005: 3 x UUP, 3 x DUP, 1 x Sinn Féin
2001–2005 Change: DUP and Sinn Féin gain from UUP and SDLP

Lurgan - 7 seats
| Party | Candidate | FPv% | Count | | | | | | |
| Party | Candidate | FPv% | 1 | 2 | 3 | 4 | 5 | 6 | 7 |
|---|---|---|---|---|---|---|---|---|---|
| UUP | Samuel Gardiner* | 21.59% | 2,109 | | | | | | |
| DUP | Stephen Moutray* | 21.08% | 2,059 | | | | | | |
| DUP | Fergie Dawson | 11.27% | 1,101 | 1,149.72 | 1,359.32 | | | | |
| DUP | Mark Russell | 3.21% | 314 | 354.74 | 707.54 | 764.22 | 1,245.46 | | |
| UUP | George Savage* | 8.22% | 803 | 1,005.86 | 1,041.46 | 1,047.18 | 1,075.52 | 1,112.1 | 1,257.1 |
| Sinn Féin | Maurice Magill | 7.51% | 734 | 734 | 734.4 | 734.4 | 734.8 | 1,105.22 | 1,111.22 |
| UUP | Meta Crozier* | 4.44% | 434 | 752.36 | 783.96 | 786.82 | 812.88 | 851.82 | 1,065.5 |
| UUP | Sydney Cairns* | 5.96% | 582 | 755.88 | 769.48 | 770.52 | 788.94 | 825.2 | 953 |
| Independent | David Calvert | 6.41% | 626 | 682.28 | 713.48 | 719.98 | 742.84 | 761.08 | |
| SDLP | Francis McAlinden | 6.48% | 633 | 643.5 | 645.1 | 645.1 | 645.52 | | |
| DUP | Anne Harrison | 3.82% | 373 | 395.68 | 536.48 | 598.36 | | | |
Electorate: 15,320 Valid: 9,768 (63.76%) Spoilt: 171 Quota: 1,222 Turnout: 9,939 (64.88%)

=== Portadown ===
2001: 2 x DUP, 2 x UUP, 1 x Sinn Féin, 1 x SDLP, 1 x Independent
2005: 3 x DUP, 1 x Sinn Féin, 1 x UUP, 1 x SDLP, 1 x Independent
2001–2005 Change: DUP gain from UUP

Portadown - 7 seats
| Party | Candidate | FPv% | Count | | | | | | | | | | | |
| Party | Candidate | FPv% | 1 | 2 | 3 | 4 | 5 | 6 | 7 | 8 | 9 | 10 | 11 | 12 |
|---|---|---|---|---|---|---|---|---|---|---|---|---|---|---|
| DUP | David Simpson* | 29.55% | 2,325 | | | | | | | | | | | |
| DUP | Sydney Anderson* | 10.28% | 809 | 1,346.66 | | | | | | | | | | |
| DUP | Alan Carson* | 2.68% | 211 | 730.1 | 1,052.63 | | | | | | | | | |
| SDLP | Ignatius Fox* | 8.94% | 703 | 705.9 | 706.29 | 708.29 | 708.39 | 711.39 | 782.39 | 1,004.39 | | | | |
| UUP | Arnold Hatch* | 9.36% | 736 | 778.34 | 782.24 | 798.4 | 811.1 | 862.8 | 888.12 | 891.7 | 1,062.7 | | | |
| Independent | David Jones* | 5.33% | 419 | 543.7 | 554.23 | 576.55 | 604.55 | 614.55 | 626.81 | 628.81 | 700.52 | 735.94 | 737.94 | 995.94 |
| Sinn Féin | Brian McKeown* | 9.93% | 781 | 781.58 | 781.58 | 782.58 | 782.58 | 782.58 | 791.58 | 839.58 | 842.58 | 842.58 | 846.58 | 850.58 |
| Sinn Féin | Ciaran Tennyson | 6.55% | 515 | 515 | 515 | 517 | 517 | 517 | 522 | 590 | 590 | 590.77 | 594.77 | 595.77 |
| Independent | Mervyn Carrick | 3.94% | 310 | 358.72 | 375.88 | 427.11 | 444.51 | 458.52 | 472.68 | 474.68 | 549.95 | 591.53 | 593.53 | |
| UUP | Mark Neale | 2.71% | 213 | 237.94 | 239.89 | 245.89 | 249.79 | 380.83 | 404.58 | 410.58 | | | | |
| SDLP | Elaine Sterritt | 4.25% | 334 | 334.58 | 334.58 | 335.58 | 335.58 | 336.58 | 375.58 | | | | | |
| Alliance | Sean Hagan | 2.75% | 216 | 221.22 | 222.39 | 223.39 | 223.69 | 225.27 | | | | | | |
| UUP | David Thompson | 2.43% | 191 | 207.24 | 209.19 | 215.19 | 219.89 | | | | | | | |
| Independent | Jim Dickson | 1.32% | 104 | 112.12 | 113.29 | | | | | | | | | |
Electorate: 13,128 Valid: 7,867 (59.93%) Spoilt: 181 Quota: 984 Turnout: 8,048 (61.30%)
