= 1997 Craigavon Borough Council election =

Local government election in Northern Ireland

← 1993	21 May 1997	2001 →

All 26 seats to Craigavon Borough Council 14 seats needed for a majority
	First party	Second party	Third party
Party	UUP	SDLP	DUP
Seats won	11	7	3
Seat change	0	▲1	▼1
	Fourth party	Fifth party	Sixth party
Party	Sinn Féin	Ind. Nationalist	Alliance
Seats won	2	2	1
Seat change	0	▲2	▼1
	Seventh party
Party	Workers' Party
Seats won	0
Seat change	▼1
- Results by district electoral area, shaded by First Preference Votes.

Elections to Craigavon Borough Council were held on 21 May 1997 on the same day as the other Northern Irish local government elections. The election used four district electoral areas to elect a total of 26 councillors.

== Election results ==
Craigavon Borough Council Election Result 1997
Party	Seats	Gains	Losses	Net gain/loss	Seats %	Votes %	Votes	+/−
UUP	11	0	0	0	42.3	39.7	12,107	▼1.4
SDLP	7	1	0	▲1	26.9	19.0	5,787	▼5.9
DUP	3	0	1	▼1	11.5	14.6	4,439	▼1.5
Sinn Féin	2	0	0	0	7.7	12.2	3,717	▲3.0
Ind. Nationalist	2	2	0	▲2	7.7	6.2	1,905	▲6.2
Alliance	1	0	1	▼1	3.8	4.5	1,366	▼1.7
Labour Coalition	0	0	0	0	0.0	2.7	817	New
Workers' Party	0	0	1	▼1	0.0	0.9	281	▼0.9
NI Women's Coalition	0	0	0	0	0.0	0.3	84	New

Note: "Votes" are the first preference votes.

== Districts summary ==
Results of the Craigavon Borough Council election, 1997 by district
Ward	%	Cllrs	%	Cllrs	%	Cllrs	%	Cllrs	%	Cllrs	%	Cllrs	Total Cllrs
Ward	UUP		SDLP		DUP		Sinn Féin		Alliance		Others		Total Cllrs
Craigavon Central	43.6	3	15.2	1	13.8	1	13.4	1	6.9	1	7.1	0	7
Loughside	7.2	0	47.0	4	1.3	0	35.3	1	0.9	0	8.3	0	5
Lurgan	64.6	5	7.6	1	17.8	1	4.3	0	4.9	0	0.8	0	7
Portadown	37.7	3	11.0	1	22.9	1	0.0	0	4.6	0	23.8	2	7
Total	39.7	11	19.0	7	14.6	3	12.2	2	4.5	1	10.0	2	26

== District results ==
=== Craigavon Central ===
1993: 3 x UUP, 1 x SDLP, 1 x DUP, 1 x Sinn Féin, 1 x Alliance
1997: 3 x UUP, 1 x SDLP, 1 x DUP, 1 x Sinn Féin, 1 x Alliance
1993-1997 Change: No change

Craigavon Central - 7 seats
Party	Candidate	FPv%	Count							
Party	Candidate	FPv%	1	2	3	4	5	6	7	8
UUP	Kenneth Twyble*	20.15%	1,576							
DUP	William Allen*	13.79%	1,079							
Sinn Féin	Francis Murray	13.40%	1,048							
SDLP	Patricia Mallon*	12.89%	1,008							
UUP	Samuel McCammick*	9.42%	737	965	991					
Alliance	Sean Hagan*	6.92%	541	563.42	564.52	565.87	566.96	568.19	708.84	914.04
UUP	Frederick Crowe*	9.23%	722	831.82	883.32	883.32	883.32	883.32	890.24	910.03
UUP	Cyril McLoughlin	4.82%	377	591.7	610.8	610.8	614.8	614.89	625.49	636.44
Labour Coalition	Alan Evans	4.97%	389	395.08	395.68	417.82	425.73	426.63	541.63	
SDLP	Philip Mallon	2.33%	182	182	182	217.01	224.37	250.86		
NI Women's Coalition	Chris Moffat	1.07%	84	88.56	88.76	89.93	90.93	91.17		
Workers' Party	Peter Smyth*	0.70%	55	56.14	56.44	60.04	61.67	62.27		
Labour Coalition	William McAvoy	0.32%	25	25	25.1	28.07				
Electorate: 15,325 Valid: 7,823 (51.05%) Spoilt: 159 Quota: 978 Turnout: 7,982 (52.08%)

=== Loughside ===
1993: 3 x SDLP, 1 x Sinn Féin, 1 x Workers' Party
1997: 4 x SDLP, 1 x Sinn Féin
1993-1997 Change: SDLP gain from Workers' Party

Loughside - 5 seats
Party	Candidate	FPv%	Count							
Party	Candidate	FPv%	1	2	3	4	5	6	7	8
Sinn Féin	John O'Dowd*	35.26%	2,320							
SDLP	Sean McCavanagh*	22.80%	1,500							
SDLP	Dolores Kelly*	10.52%	692	926.96	1,019.03	1,021.79	1,030.94	1,077.05	1,134.05	
SDLP	Mary McAlinden	8.54%	562	830.4	922.2	929.14	942.59	979.61	1,022.58	1,125.58
SDLP	Kieran McGeown	5.15%	339	755.24	923.18	931	938.03	974.87	1,015.23	1,065.23
UUP	Thomas Crozier	7.16%	471	471	471.54	471.54	487.54	566.54	572.54	575.54
Workers' Party	Tom French	3.44%	226	358.88	371.3	378.97	391.15	406.95	491.98	
Labour Coalition	Hugh Casey*	3.09%	203	258.44	270.86	274.04	279.04	294.83		
Labour Coalition	Mark McKavanagh	1.54%	101	161.72	173.33	179.12	186			
DUP	Anne Hanlon	1.35%	89	90.76	90.76	90.76	90.76			
Alliance	Adrian McKinney	0.94%	62	77.84	80.27	84.15				
Labour Coalition	Mary Sheen	0.21%	14	47.44	50.14					
Electorate: 11,783 Valid: 6,579 (55.83%) Spoilt: 109 Quota: 1,097 Turnout: 6,688 (56.76%)

=== Lurgan ===
1993: 5 x UUP, 1 x DUP, 1 x SDLP
1997: 5 x UUP, 1 x DUP, 1 x SDLP
1993-1997 Change: No change

Lurgan - 7 seats
Party	Candidate	FPv%	Count							
Party	Candidate	FPv%	1	2	3	4	5	6	7	8
UUP	Samuel Gardiner	22.45%	1,802							
UUP	George Savage	17.08%	1,371							
UUP	Meta Crozier*	8.61%	691	1,034.2						
UUP	Jonathan Bell	8.16%	655	778.64	873.68	877.56	878.56	887.62	980.98	1,069.98
UUP	Sydney Cairns*	5.41%	434	526.84	619.72	623.97	623.97	630.51	742.26	961.02
SDLP	Mary McNally*	7.65%	614	615.76	616.3	634.3	877.3	877.33	953.87	959.29
DUP	Ruth Allen*	10.00%	803	840.4	866.59	868.86	868.86	870.09	889.36	922.32
DUP	Frederick Baird	7.76%	623	689.88	719.85	721.56	721.56	722.91	740.31	775.19
UUP	William McCullough	2.86%	230	335.6	438.74	442.55	444.99	449.46	485.06	
Alliance	Wilson Freeburn	4.86%	390	399.68	405.62	435.04	442.04	442.13		
Sinn Féin	Bernadette O'Hagan	4.35%	349	349.44	349.44	350.44				
Labour Coalition	Gillian Kirk	0.61%	49	51.2	53.9					
Labour Coalition	James Devlin	0.21%	17	18.32	18.59					
Electorate: 14,526 Valid: 8,028 (55.27%) Spoilt: 136 Quota: 1,004 Turnout: 8,164 (56.20%)

=== Portadown ===
1993: 3 x UUP, 2 x DUP, 1 x SDLP, 1 x Alliance
1997: 3 x UUP, 2 x Independent Nationalist, 1 x DUP, 1 x SDLP
1993-1997 Change: Independent Nationalist (two seats) gain from DUP and Alliance

Portadown - 7 seats
Party	Candidate	FPv%	Count								
Party	Candidate	FPv%	1	2	3	4	5	6	7	8	9
DUP	Mervyn Carrick*	21.22%	1,713								
Ind. Nationalist	Breandán Mac Cionnaith	18.49%	1,493								
UUP	James Gillespie*	14.90%	1,203								
UUP	Joseph Trueman*	11.38%	919	994.85	994.85	996.26	1,053.54				
SDLP	Ignatius Fox*	11.02%	890	891.64	928.76	934.17	934.65	1,025.65			
UUP	Mark Neale	6.38%	515	636.77	636.77	637.18	747.58	830.97	845.61	849.32	1,049.84
Ind. Nationalist	Joe Duffy	5.10%	412	413.23	840.43	840.43	840.43	861.27	861.27	870.28	870.28
UUP	David Thompson	5.00%	404	447.46	447.46	448.46	465.42	566.36	591.68	593.8	820.12
DUP	John Tate*	1.64%	132	564.96	564.96	566.37	570.05	584.42	586.22	586.75	
Alliance	William Ramsay*	4.62%	373	382.43	387.87	395.19	397.11				
Labour Coalition	Carol Lindsay	0.24%	19	20.64	20.96						
Electorate: 13,916 Valid: 8,073 (58.01%) Spoilt: 169 Quota: 1,010 Turnout: 8,242 (59.23%)
