= 2001 Craigavon Borough Council election =

Local government election in Northern Ireland

← 1997	7 June 2001	2005 →

All 26 seats to Craigavon Borough Council 14 seats needed for a majority
	First party	Second party	Third party
Party	UUP	SDLP	DUP
Seats won	8	7	6
Seat change	▼3	0	▲3
	Fourth party	Fifth party	Sixth party
Party	Sinn Féin	Independent	Ind. Nationalist
Seats won	4	1	0
Seat change	▲2	▲1	▼2
	Seventh party
Party	Alliance
Seats won	0
Seat change	▼1
- Party with the most votes by district.

Elections to Craigavon Borough Council were held on 7 June 2001 on the same day as the other Northern Irish local government elections. The election used four district electoral areas to elect a total of 26 councillors.

== Election results ==
Craigavon Borough Council Election Result 2001
Party	Seats	Gains	Losses	Net gain/loss	Seats %	Votes %	Votes	+/−
UUP	8	0	3	▼3	30.8	28.1	11,127	▼11.6
SDLP	7	1	1	0	26.9	20.0	7,947	▲1.0
DUP	6	3	0	▲3	23.1	22.6	8,972	▲8.0
Sinn Féin	4	2	0	▲2	15.4	21.3	8,456	▲9.1
Independent	1	1	0	▲1	3.8	4.9	1,958	▲4.9
Alliance	0	0	1	▼1	0.0	1.6	645	▼2.9
UK Unionist	0	0	0	0	0.0	1.0	408	New
Workers' Party	0	0	0	0	0.0	0.3	132	0.0

Note: "Votes" are the first preference votes.

== Districts summary ==
Results of the Craigavon Borough Council election, 2001 by district
Ward	%	Cllrs	%	Cllrs	%	Cllrs	%	Cllrs	%	Cllrs	%	Cllrs	Total Cllrs
Ward	UUP		SDLP		DUP		Sinn Féin		Alliance		Others		Total Cllrs
Craigavon Central	29.5	2	16.4	2	24.3	2	16.9	1	3.6	0	9.3	0	7
Loughside	4.9	0	47.1	3	2.9	0	45.1	2	0.0	0	0.0	0	5
Lurgan	47.1	4	7.7	1	33.3	2	6.8	0	0.0	0	5.1	0	7
Portadown	26.9	2	12.8	1	27.2	2	20.2	1	2.8	0	10.1	1	7
Total	28.1	8	20.0	7	22.6	6	21.3	4	1.6	0	6.4	1	26

== District results ==
=== Craigavon Central ===
1997: 3 x UUP, 1 x SDLP, 1 x DUP, 1 x Sinn Féin, 1 x Alliance
2001: 2 x DUP, 2 x UUP, 2 x SDLP, 1 x Sinn Féin
1997-2001 Change: DUP and SDLP gain from UUP and Alliance

Craigavon Central - 7 seats
Party	Candidate	FPv%	Count										
Party	Candidate	FPv%	1	2	3	4	5	6	7	8	9	10	11
UUP	Kenneth Twyble*	15.93%	1,694										
Sinn Féin	Francis Murray*	11.27%	1,198	1,198	1,220	1,220	1,224	1,728					
SDLP	Patricia Mallon*	9.37%	996	997.89	1,057.89	1,062.31	1,162.36	1,211.78	1,390.78				
UUP	Frederick Crowe*	7.54%	802	887.26	904.26	1,030.97	1,132.48	1,133.48	1,133.48	1,133.97	1,438.97		
DUP	William Smith	9.97%	1,060	1,075.12	1,078.12	1,082.17	1,087.8	1,087.8	1,087.8	1,087.8	1,130.14	1,149.04	1,332.04
DUP	Robert Smith	7.62%	810	813.36	816.57	820.2	822.83	822.83	822.83	822.83	860	883.8	1,289.72
SDLP	Kieran Corr	7.01%	745	745.63	782.63	784.63	843.47	871.68	942.68	1,000.99	1,042.38	1,054.28	1,062.24
DUP	Denis Watson	6.70%	712	738.25	741.25	752.51	758.93	758.93	758.93	759.42	839.82	876.22	1,045.41
Independent	David Calvert	7.16%	761	766.46	770.46	774.51	783.93	783.93	784.93	784.93	819.48	836.98	
UUP	Samuel McCammick*	3.72%	396	527.25	532.46	665.88	753.18	753.18	753.18	754.16			
Sinn Féin	Peter Toland	5.66%	602	602.21	618.42	618.42	622.63						
Alliance	Sean Hagan*	3.56%	379	394.12	429.96	446.32							
UUP	Audrey Lindsay	2.35%	250	313.84	315.84								
Workers' Party	Tom French	1.24%	132	132.84									
Independent	Alan Evans	0.90%	96	97.05									
Electorate: 15,747 Valid: 10,633 (67.52%) Spoilt: 254 Quota: 1,330 Turnout: 10,887 (69.14%)

=== Loughside ===
1997: 4 x SDLP, 1 x Sinn Féin
2001: 3 x SDLP, 2 x Sinn Féin
1997-2001 Change: Sinn Féin gain from SDLP

Loughside - 5 seats
Party	Candidate	FPv%	Count					
Party	Candidate	FPv%	1	2	3	4	5	6
SDLP	Dolores Kelly*	22.84%	2,022					
Sinn Féin	John O'Dowd*	22.27%	1,971					
SDLP	Sean McCavanagh*	11.92%	1,055	1,214.04	1,232.54	1,235.82	1,392.52	1,449.92
Sinn Féin	Maurice Magill	12.78%	1,131	1,175.24	1,376.49	1,378.49	1,394.23	1,404.51
SDLP	Mary McAlinden*	8.30%	735	996.8	1,010.55	1,013.55	1,212.21	1,401.45
Sinn Féin	Mairéad O'Dowd	9.98%	883	904.56	1,144.56	1,145.56	1,167.71	1,168.71
UUP	William Lindsay	4.89%	433	437.48	437.48	641.48	642.48	
SDLP	Kieran McGeown*	4.07%	360	411.24	417.99	417.99		
DUP	Alexander Dougan	2.95%	261	261.28	261.28			
Electorate: 12,545 Valid: 8,851 (70.55%) Spoilt: 255 Quota: 1,476 Turnout: 9,106 (72.59%)

=== Lurgan ===
1997: 5 x UUP, 1 x DUP, 1 x SDLP
2001: 4 x UUP, 2 x DUP, 1 x SDLP
1997-2001 Change: DUP gain from UUP

Lurgan - 7 seats
Party	Candidate	FPv%	Count					
Party	Candidate	FPv%	1	2	3	4	5	6
DUP	Jonathan Bell*	18.48%	1,942					
UUP	Samuel Gardiner*	16.44%	1,728					
DUP	Stephen Moutray	14.80%	1,555					
UUP	George Savage*	11.77%	1,237	1,315.07				
UUP	Meta Crozier*	9.18%	965	1,089.32	1,332.44			
UUP	Sydney Cairns*	7.13%	749	854.08	952.24	1,032.04	1,332.64	
SDLP	Mary McNally*	7.62%	801	806.92	813.64	816.11	842.63	1,342.63
UK Unionist	David Vance	3.88%	408	683.65	697.81	811.05	886.49	887.86
Sinn Féin	Matthew Rooney	6.84%	719	719.37	719.61	719.8	719.8	
UUP	William Tate	2.63%	276	290.8	325.6	356		
Independent	William Grafton	1.24%	130	147.76	150.4	160.66		
Electorate: 14,911 Valid: 10,510 (70.48%) Spoilt: 236 Quota: 1,314 Turnout: 10,746 (72.07%)

=== Portadown ===
1997: 3 x UUP, 2 x Independent Nationalist, 1 x DUP, 1 x SDLP
2001: 2 x DUP, 2 x UUP, 1 x Sinn Féin, 1 x SDLP, 1 x Independent
1997-2001 Change: DUP, Sinn Féin and Independent gain from UUP and Independent Nationalist (two seats)

Portadown - 7 seats
Party	Candidate	FPv%	Count							
Party	Candidate	FPv%	1	2	3	4	5	6	7	8
DUP	David Simpson	24.37%	2,352							
Sinn Féin	Brian McKeown*	13.97%	1,348							
SDLP	Ignatius Fox*	12.78%	1,233							
UUP	Arnold Hatch	9.04%	872	900.42	900.42	943.38	1,033.85	1,049.14	1,049.71	1,353.71
UUP	Sydney Anderson	9.15%	883	954.54	954.64	984.72	1,041.13	1,066.71	1,067.52	1,326.52
Independent	David Jones	10.06%	971	1,112.12	1,112.12	1,130.59	1,145.57	1,182.5	1,182.92	1,211.92
DUP	Alan Carson	2.21%	213	638.32	638.52	639.01	647.93	1,032.01	1,032.1	1,095.09
Sinn Féin	Noel Mercer	6.26%	604	604	732.9	759.3	760.3	760.79	783.98	789.04
UUP	Mark Neale*	4.79%	462	486.5	486.6	520.6	758.46	782.22	783.03	
DUP	John Tate	0.69%	67	478.6	478.6	484.07	498.97			
UUP	David Thompson	3.94%	380	403.52	403.62	440.62				
Alliance	William Ramsay	2.75%	266	272.86	274.56					
Electorate: 13,514 Valid: 9,651 (71.41%) Spoilt: 243 Quota: 1,207 Turnout: 9,894 (73.21%)
