= 1993 Craigavon Borough Council election =

Local government election in Northern Ireland

← 1989	19 May 1993	1997 →

All 26 seats to Craigavon Borough Council 14 seats needed for a majority
	First party	Second party	Third party
Party	UUP	SDLP	DUP
Seats won	11	6	4
Seat change	▼1	0	0
	Fourth party	Fifth party	Sixth party
Party	Sinn Féin	Alliance	Workers' Party
Seats won	2	2	1
Seat change	▲1	0	0
- Party with the most votes by district.

Elections to Craigavon Borough Council were held on 19 May 1993, on the same day as the other Northern Irish local government elections. The election used four district electoral areas to elect a total of 26 councillors.

== Election results ==
Craigavon Borough Council Election Result 1993
Party	Seats	Gains	Losses	Net gain/loss	Seats %	Votes %	Votes	+/−
UUP	11	1	2	▼1	42.3	41.1	11,859	▼1.3
SDLP	6	0	0	0	23.1	24.9	7,184	▲3.9
DUP	4	1	1	0	15.4	16.1	4,628	▲1.7
Sinn Féin	2	1	0	▲1	7.7	9.2	2,649	▲0.8
Alliance	2	0	0	0	7.7	6.2	1,788	▲0.4
Workers' Party	1	0	0	0	3.8	1.8	510	▼2.5
NI Conservatives	0	0	0	0	0.0	0.7	208	New

Note: "Votes" are the first preference votes.

== Districts summary ==
Results of the Craigavon Borough Council election, 1993 by district
Ward	%	Cllrs	%	Cllrs	%	Cllrs	%	Cllrs	%	Cllrs	%	Cllrs	%	Cllrs	Total Cllrs
Ward	UUP		SDLP		DUP		Sinn Féin		Alliance		Workers' Party		Others		Total Cllrs
Craigavon Central	42.6	3	19.5	1	15.2	1	11.2	1	7.8	1	3.7	0	0.0	0	7
Loughside	9.8	0	62.1	3	2.3	0	21.9	1	0.0	0	3.9	1	0.0	0	5
Lurgan	60.0	5	9.2	1	20.6	1	0.0	0	7.5	0	0.0	0	2.7	0	7
Portadown	43.8	3	18.4	1	22.8	2	8.0	0	7.0	1	0.0	0	0.0	0	7
Total	41.1	11	24.9	6	16.1	4	9.2	2	6.2	2	1.8	1	0.7	0	26

== District results ==
=== Craigavon Central ===
1989: 4 x UUP, 1 x SDLP, 1 x DUP, 1 x Alliance
1993: 3 x UUP, 1 x SDLP, 1 x DUP, 1 x Sinn Féin, 1 x Alliance
1989-1993 Change: Sinn Féin gain from UUP

Craigavon Central - 7 seats
Party	Candidate	FPv%	Count						
Party	Candidate	FPv%	1	2	3	4	5	6	7
UUP	Kenneth Twyble	16.12%	1,246						
DUP	William Allen	15.16%	1,172						
UUP	Frederick Crowe*	9.92%	767	808.36	907.36	910.36	982.36		
UUP	Samuel McCammick*	8.47%	655	736.18	773.98	779.42	872.78	1,195.78	
SDLP	Patricia Mallon	11.01%	851	851.22	851.4	933.4	934.4	936.02	937.02
Sinn Féin	Brendan Curran*	11.19%	865	865.22	865.58	884.58	884.58	884.8	884.8
Alliance	Sean Hagan*	7.79%	602	613.44	615.24	686.04	698.8	786.92	857.92
SDLP	Gabriel O'Dowd	8.49%	656	656.44	626.62	709.62	709.62	714.34	718.34
UUP	Elizabeth McClurg*	4.90%	379	471.84	500.28	505.12	630.08		
UUP	Pauline Lindsay*	3.26%	252	291.6	320.04	321.04			
Workers' Party	Tom French*	3.69%	285	286.98	287.52				
Electorate: 15,087 Valid: 7,730 (51.24%) Spoilt: 250 Quota: 967 Turnout: 7,980 (52.89%)

=== Loughside ===
1989: 3 x SDLP, 1 x Sinn Féin, 1 x Workers' Party
1993: 3 x SDLP, 1 x Sinn Féin, 1 x Workers' Party
1989-1993 Change: No change

Loughside - 5 seats
Party	Candidate	FPv%	Count					
Party	Candidate	FPv%	1	2	3	4	5	6
SDLP	Sean McCavanagh*	25.49%	1,470					
SDLP	Hugh Casey*	22.43%	1,294					
Sinn Féin	Brendan McConville	21.86%	1,261					
SDLP	Dolores Kelly	14.16%	817	1,272.1				
Workers' Party	Peter Smyth	3.90%	225	264.59	584.17	757.7	761.39	994.39
UUP	Thomas Crozier	9.83%	567	568.11	573.33	577.77	700.83	708.83
DUP	Anne Hanlon	2.32%	134	135.85	141.07	141.81		
Electorate: 11,256 Valid: 5,768 (51.24%) Spoilt: 213 Quota: 962 Turnout: 5,981 (53.14%)

=== Lurgan ===
1989: 4 x UUP, 2 x DUP, 1 x SDLP
1993: 5 x UUP, 1 x DUP, 1 x SDLP
1989-1993 Change: UUP gain from DUP

Lurgan - 7 seats
Party	Candidate	FPv%	Count								
Party	Candidate	FPv%	1	2	3	4	5	6	7	8	9
UUP	Audrey Savage*	18.77%	1,472								
DUP	Ruth Allen*	15.03%	1,179								
UUP	Sydney Cairns*	12.31%	965	1,048.16							
UUP	Samuel Lutton*	11.44%	897	1,007.22							
UUP	Meta Crozier*	10.86%	852	959.91	987.28						
UUP	Donald MacKay	3.67%	288	318.03	324.15	385.81	417.31	428.59	431.03	687.6	927.54
SDLP	Mary McNally*	9.17%	719	720.65	720.99	724.99	724.99	725.07	725.07	726.07	858.48
DUP	David Martin	5.59%	438	463.08	616.59	640.61	645.41	648.05	649.77	713.26	760.02
Alliance	Wilson Freeburn	7.47%	586	591.61	593.31	638.97	643.77	644.25	644.57	671.49	
UUP	William McCullough	3.03%	238	343.93	349.54	395.17	420.37	429.41	430.41		
NI Conservatives	Colette Jones	2.65%	208	217.9	220.45						
Electorate: 14,012 Valid: 7,842 (55.97%) Spoilt: 173 Quota: 981 Turnout: 8,015 (57.20%)

=== Portadown ===
1989: 4 x UUP, 1 x DUP, 1 x SDLP, 1 x Alliance
1993: 3 x UUP, 2 x DUP, 1 x SDLP, 1 x Alliance
1989-1993 Change: DUP gain from UUP

Portadown - 7 seats
Party	Candidate	FPv%	Count					
Party	Candidate	FPv%	1	2	3	4	5	6
DUP	Mervyn Carrick	18.96%	1,419					
SDLP	Ignatius Fox*	18.39%	1,377					
UUP	James Gillespie*	17.98%	1,346					
UUP	Joseph Trueman*	13.40%	1,003					
UUP	Brian Maguinness*	7.20%	539	611.08	613.42	924.97	1,229.97	
Alliance	William Ramsay*	8.01%	600	612.92	919.07	928.06	963.06	
DUP	John Tate	3.82%	286	636.54	636.93	650.88	749.74	921.24
Sinn Féin	John Dunbar	6.99%	523	523.34	647.36	647.98	650.33	650.33
UUP	Anna Moore*	5.25%	393	427	427.39	498.07		
Electorate: 13,876 Valid: 7,486 (53.95%) Spoilt: 171 Quota: 936 Turnout: 7,657 (55.18%)
