= Portadown (District Electoral Area) =

District electoral area in Northern Ireland

- Armagh City, Banbridge and Craigavon Borough Council DEA constituency

Current constituency
- Created: 1985
- Seats: 7 (1985-2014); 6 (2014-)
- Councillors: Paul Duffy (SF); Julie Flaherty (UUP); Clare McConville-Walker (SF); Lavelle McIlwrath (DUP); Kyle Moutray (DUP); Alan Mulholland (DUP)

Portadown DEA within Armagh City, Banbridge and Craigavon

Portadown DEA (1993-2014) within Craigavon

Portadown is one of the seven district electoral areas (DEA) in Armagh City, Banbridge and Craigavon, Northern Ireland. The district elects six members to Armagh City, Banbridge and Craigavon Borough Council and contains the wards of Ballybay, Corcrain, Killycomain, Loughgall, Mahon and The Birches. Portadown forms part of the Upper Bann constituencies for the Northern Ireland Assembly and UK Parliament.

It was created for the 1985 local elections, mainly replacing Craigavon Area B which had existed since 1973, where it originally contained seven wards (Annagh, Ballybay, Ballyoran, Brownstown, Corcrain, Tavanagh and The Birches). For the 2014 local elections it gained parts of the abolished Central DEA around Killycomain, and parts of The Orchard DEA around Loughgall.

== Councillors ==
Election	Councillor (party)	Councillor (party)	Councillor (party)	Councillor (party)	Councillor (party)	Councillor (party)	Councillor (party)
2023	Paul Duffy (Sinn Féin)	Clare McConville-Walker (Sinn Féin)	Julie Flaherty (UUP)	Lavelle McIlwrath (DUP)	Kyle Moutray (DUP)	Alan Mulholland (DUP)	6 seats 2014–present
November 2022 Co-Option	Paul Duffy (Sinn Féin)	Eamonn McNeill (SDLP)	Julie Flaherty (UUP)	Lavelle McIlwrath (DUP)	Kyle Moutray (DUP)	Sydney Anderson (DUP)	6 seats 2014–present
November 2021 Defection	Paul Duffy (Sinn Féin)	Eamonn McNeill (SDLP)	Julie Flaherty (UUP)	Lavelle McIlwrath (DUP)	Darryn Causby (DUP)/ (Independent)	Sydney Anderson (DUP)	6 seats 2014–present
June 2021 Defection	Paul Duffy (Sinn Féin)	Eamonn McNeill (SDLP)	Julie Flaherty (UUP)	Lavelle McIlwrath (DUP)	Darryn Causby (DUP)/ (Independent)	Sydney Anderson (DUP)	6 seats 2014–present
2019	Paul Duffy (Sinn Féin)	Eamonn McNeill (SDLP)	Julie Flaherty (UUP)	Lavelle McIlwrath (DUP)	Darryn Causby (DUP)/ (Independent)	Sydney Anderson (DUP)	6 seats 2014–present
May 2018 Defection	Paul Duffy (Sinn Féin)	David Jones (UKIP)/ (Independent)	Julie Flaherty (UUP)	Arnold Hatch (UUP)	Darryn Causby (DUP)/ (Independent)	Louise Templeton (DUP)	6 seats 2014–present
April 2017 Co-Option	Paul Duffy (Sinn Féin)	David Jones (UKIP)/ (Independent)	Julie Flaherty (UUP)	Arnold Hatch (UUP)	Darryn Causby (DUP)/ (Independent)	Louise Templeton (DUP)	6 seats 2014–present
February 2017 Co-Option	Paul Duffy (Sinn Féin)	David Jones (UKIP)/ (Independent)	Julie Flaherty (UUP)	Arnold Hatch (UUP)	Darryn Causby (DUP)/ (Independent)	Jonathan Buckley (DUP)	6 seats 2014–present
May 2016 Co-Option	Gemma McKenna (Sinn Féin)	David Jones (UKIP)/ (Independent)	Julie Flaherty (UUP)	Arnold Hatch (UUP)	Darryn Causby (DUP)/ (Independent)	Jonathan Buckley (DUP)	6 seats 2014–present
2014	Gemma McKenna (Sinn Féin)	David Jones (UKIP)/ (Independent)	Doug Beattie (UUP)	Arnold Hatch (UUP)	Darryn Causby (DUP)/ (Independent)	Jonathan Buckley (DUP)	6 seats 2014–present
2011	Gemma McKenna (Sinn Féin)	Paul Duffy (Sinn Féin)	Gladys McCullough (DUP)	Arnold Hatch (UUP)	Darryn Causby (DUP)/ (Independent)	Alan Carson (DUP)	Sydney Anderson (DUP)/ (UUP)
2005	Brian McKeown (Sinn Féin)	Ignatius Fox (SDLP)	David Simpson (DUP)	Arnold Hatch (UUP)	David Jones (Independent)	Alan Carson (DUP)	Sydney Anderson (DUP)/ (UUP)
2001	Brian McKeown (Sinn Féin)	Ignatius Fox (SDLP)	David Simpson (DUP)	Arnold Hatch (UUP)	David Jones (Independent)	Alan Carson (DUP)	Sydney Anderson (DUP)/ (UUP)
1997	Breandán Mac Cionnaith (Independent Nationalist)	Ignatius Fox (SDLP)	James Gillespie (UUP)	Joseph Trueman (UUP)	Mark Neale (UUP)	Joe Duffy (Independent Nationalist)	Mervyn Carrick (DUP)
1993	William Ramsay (Alliance)	Ignatius Fox (SDLP)	James Gillespie (UUP)	Joseph Trueman (UUP)	Brian Maguinness (UUP)	John Tate (DUP)	Mervyn Carrick (DUP)
1989	William Ramsay (Alliance)	Ignatius Fox (SDLP)	James Gillespie (UUP)	Joseph Trueman (UUP)	Brian Maguinness (UUP)	Anna Moore (UUP)	Michael Briggs (DUP)
1985	Brian McCann (Sinn Féin)	Ignatius Fox (SDLP)	James Gillespie (UUP)	Arnold Hatch (UUP)	Alan Locke (UUP)	Gladys McCullough (DUP)	Michael Briggs (DUP)

== 2023 election ==
2019: 3 x DUP, 1 x Sinn Féin, 1 x UUP, 1 x SDLP

2023: 3 x DUP, 2 x Sinn Féin, 1 x UUP

2019–2023 change: Sinn Féin gain from SDLP

Portadown - 6 seats
Party	Candidate	FPv%	Count								
Party	Candidate	FPv%	1	2	3	4	5	6	7	8	9
Sinn Féin	Paul Duffy*	16.28%	1,986								
DUP	Lavelle McIlwrath*	14.96%	1,826								
DUP	Kyle Moutray*	14.88%	1,816								
UUP	Julie Flaherty*	11.10%	1,355	1,623	1,624.08	1,628.56	1,631.17	1,799.17			
DUP	Alan Mulholland	11.74%	1,432	1,454	1,454.48	1,516.72	1,564.39	2,126.39			
Sinn Féin	Clare McConville-Walker	7.43%	907	907	1,107.28	1,107.32	1,107.35	1,108.47	1,109.47	1,492.06	1,493.06
Alliance	Emma Hutchinson	7.55%	921	931	942.76	943.00	943.30	958.01	1,021.01	1,437.03	1,470.03
SDLP	Eamon McNeill*	6.90%	842	844	861.88	862.44	862.59	867.99	903.99		
TUV	Robert Oliver	6.52%	795	806	806.36	811.24	814.63				
UUP	Zöe McCullough	2.64%	322								
Electorate: 22,318 Valid: 12,202 (54.67%) Spoilt: 214 Quota: 1,744 Turnout: 12,416 (55.63%)

== 2019 election ==
2014: 2 x DUP, 2 x UUP, 1 x Sinn Féin, 1 x UKIP

2019: 3 x DUP, 1 x UUP, 1 x Sinn Féin, 1 x SDLP

2014-2019 change: DUP and SDLP gain from UUP and UKIP

Portadown - 6 seats
Party	Candidate	FPv%	Count								
Party	Candidate	FPv%	1	2	3	4	5	6	7	8	9
DUP	Darryn Causby* ‡‡†	18.51%	2,077								
DUP	Sydney Anderson	15.11%	1,696								
Sinn Féin	Paul Duffy*	14.92%	1,675								
UUP	Julie Flaherty*	13.47%	1,512	1,591.2	1,607.2						
DUP	Lavelle McIlwrath	7.72%	866	1,157.72	1,210.62	1,238.87	1,238.99	1,330.67	1,331.67	1,343.91	1,618.91
SDLP	Eamonn McNeill	8.62%	967	967.44	967.79	967.84	976.36	983.36	1,250.25	1,583.4	1,590.4
UUP	Arnold Hatch*	4.51%	506	518.1	522.9	544.93	545.21	633.08	636.32	758.94	976.94
TUV	Darrin Foster	4.87%	547	575.38	580.73	615.96	616.24	697.6	698.64	713.25	
Alliance	Emma Hutchinson	5.08%	570	573.3	573.85	580.9	582.58	596.02	630.71		
Sinn Féin	Callum O'Dufaigh	3.49%	392	392.44	392.54	392.54	446.02	448.06			
Independent	David Jones*	2.37%	266	289.98	291.53	340.39	340.43				
UKIP	David Jameson	1.33%	149	163.08	164.88						
Electorate: 21,698 Valid: 11,223 (51.72%) Spoilt: 224 Quota: 1,604 Turnout: 11,447 (52.76%)

== 2014 election ==
2011: 4 x DUP, 2 x Sinn Féin, 1 x UUP

2014: 2 x DUP, 2 x UUP, 1 x Sinn Féin, 1 x UKIP

2011-2014 change: UUP and UKIP gain from DUP (two seats), Sinn Féin loss due to the reduction of one seat

Portadown - 6 seats
Party	Candidate	FPv%	Count								
Party	Candidate	FPv%	1	2	3	4	5	6	7	8	9
DUP	Jonathan Buckley* †	14.19%	1,738								
Sinn Féin	Gemma McKenna* †	10.30%	929	939	939	939.13	941.13	1,592.13			
DUP	Darryn Causby*	11.21%	954	968	1,115.29	1,266.33	1,442.84	1,443.84	2,035.84		
UUP	Doug Beattie †	13.57%	1,089	1,127	1,150.53	1,224.92	1,399.7	1,399.7	1,504.75	1,738.75	
UUP	Arnold Hatch*	12.21%	955	994	1,003.23	1,041.62	1,121.66	1,123.66	1,203.29	1,368.29	1,546.29
UKIP	David Jones ‡	7.73%	818	841	847.11	978.37	1,246.67	1,256.8	1,323.01	1,361.01	1,387.01
SDLP	Eamon McNeill*	9.53%	917	1,002	1,002.39	1,004.39	1,005.39	1,138.39	1,145.39	1,149.39	1,149.39
DUP	Terry McWilliams*	7.56%	753	763	786.66	823.18	902.35	906.48			
Sinn Féin	Paul Duffy*	8.76%	827	838	838.52	838.52	841.52				
TUV	Paul Coleman	6.67%	716	720	728.19	818.71					
PUP	John Stevenson	5.05%	542	550	553.38						
Alliance	Pete Giffen	1.98%	213								
NI21	Kyle Thomas	0.79%	85								
Electorate: 20,556 Valid: 10,536 (51.26%) Spoilt: 196 Quota: 1,506 Turnout: 10,732 (52.21%)

== 2011 election ==
2005: 3 x DUP, 1 x Sinn Féin, 1 x UUP, 1 x SDLP, 1 x Independent

2011: 4 x DUP, 2 x Sinn Féin, 1 x UUP

2005-2011 change: DUP and Sinn Féin gain from SDLP and Independent

Portadown - 7 seats
Party	Candidate	FPv%	Count								
Party	Candidate	FPv%	1	2	3	4	5	6	7	8	9
DUP	Sydney Anderson*	28.59%	2,029								
DUP	Alan Carson*	4.90%	348	1,056.4							
UUP	Arnold Hatch*	12.44%	883	966.44							
DUP	Gladys McCullough	9.37%	665	872.76	915.14						
Sinn Féin	Paul Duffy	11.39%	808	809.12	809.38	809.38	816.38	817.38	858.38	858.47	859.47
Sinn Féin	Gemma McKenna	11.18%	793	793.56	793.56	793.56	801.56	802.12	823.12	823.12	823.12
DUP	Darren Causby	3.34%	237	299.72	412.17	426.73	428.73	512.64	514.77	534.21	806.9
SDLP	John McGoldrick	5.13%	364	366.24	366.37	366.37	402.93	405.62	554.31	554.4	571.4
UUP	Robert Oliver	4.65%	330	351.84	356.39	400.63	407.19	493.87	497	501.86	
SDLP	Mary McAlinden*	3.64%	258	259.12	259.38	259.38	342.07	345.63			
TUV	Karen Boal	3.06%	217	246.68	248.37	252.85	252.85				
SDLP	Daniel Gouveia	2.31%	164	166.24	166.37	166.93					
Electorate: 13,650 Valid: 7,096 (51.99%) Spoilt: 174 Quota: 888 Turnout: 7,270 (53.26%)

== 2005 election ==
2001: 2 x DUP, 2 x UUP, 1 x Sinn Féin, 1 x SDLP, 1 x Independent

2005: 3 x DUP, 1 x Sinn Féin, 1 x UUP, 1 x SDLP, 1 x Independent

2001–2005 change: DUP gain from UUP

Portadown - 7 seats
Party	Candidate	FPv%	Count											
Party	Candidate	FPv%	1	2	3	4	5	6	7	8	9	10	11	12
DUP	David Simpson*	29.55%	2,325											
DUP	Sydney Anderson*	10.28%	809	1,346.66										
DUP	Alan Carson*	2.68%	211	730.1	1,052.63									
SDLP	Ignatius Fox*	8.94%	703	705.9	706.29	708.29	708.39	711.39	782.39	1,004.39				
UUP	Arnold Hatch*	9.36%	736	778.34	782.24	798.4	811.1	862.8	888.12	891.7	1,062.7			
Independent	David Jones*	5.33%	419	543.7	554.23	576.55	604.55	614.55	626.81	628.81	700.52	735.94	737.94	995.94
Sinn Féin	Brian McKeown*	9.93%	781	781.58	781.58	782.58	782.58	782.58	791.58	839.58	842.58	842.58	846.58	850.58
Sinn Féin	Ciaran Tennyson	6.55%	515	515	515	517	517	517	522	590	590	590.77	594.77	595.77
Independent	Mervyn Carrick	3.94%	310	358.72	375.88	427.11	444.51	458.52	472.68	474.68	549.95	591.53	593.53	
UUP	Mark Neale	2.71%	213	237.94	239.89	245.89	249.79	380.83	404.58	410.58				
SDLP	Elaine Sterritt	4.25%	334	334.58	334.58	335.58	335.58	336.58	375.58					
Alliance	Sean Hagan	2.75%	216	221.22	222.39	223.39	223.69	225.27						
UUP	David Thompson	2.43%	191	207.24	209.19	215.19	219.89							
Independent	Jim Dickson	1.32%	104	112.12	113.29									
Electorate: 13,128 Valid: 7,867 (59.93%) Spoilt: 181 Quota: 984 Turnout: 8,048 (61.30%)

== 2001 election ==
1997: 3 x UUP, 2 x Independent Nationalist, 1 x DUP, 1 x SDLP

2001: 2 x DUP, 2 x UUP, 1 x Sinn Féin, 1 x SDLP, 1 x Independent

1997-2001 change: DUP, Sinn Féin and Independent gain from UUP and Independent Nationalist (two seats)

Portadown - 7 seats
Party	Candidate	FPv%	Count							
Party	Candidate	FPv%	1	2	3	4	5	6	7	8
DUP	David Simpson	24.37%	2,352							
Sinn Féin	Brian McKeown*	13.97%	1,348							
SDLP	Ignatius Fox*	12.78%	1,233							
UUP	Arnold Hatch	9.04%	872	900.42	900.42	943.38	1,033.85	1,049.14	1,049.71	1,353.71
UUP	Sydney Anderson	9.15%	883	954.54	954.64	984.72	1,041.13	1,066.71	1,067.52	1,326.52
Independent	David Jones	10.06%	971	1,112.12	1,112.12	1,130.59	1,145.57	1,182.5	1,182.92	1,211.92
DUP	Alan Carson	2.21%	213	638.32	638.52	639.01	647.93	1,032.01	1,032.1	1,095.09
Sinn Féin	Noel Mercer	6.26%	604	604	732.9	759.3	760.3	760.79	783.98	789.04
UUP	Mark Neale*	4.79%	462	486.5	486.6	520.6	758.46	782.22	783.03	
DUP	John Tate	0.69%	67	478.6	478.6	484.07	498.97			
UUP	David Thompson	3.94%	380	403.52	403.62	440.62				
Alliance	William Ramsay	2.75%	266	272.86	274.56					
Electorate: 13,514 Valid: 9,651 (71.41%) Spoilt: 243 Quota: 1,207 Turnout: 9,894 (73.21%)

== 1997 election ==
1993: 3 x UUP, 2 x DUP, 1 x SDLP, 1 x Alliance

1997: 3 x UUP, 2 x Independent Nationalist, 1 x DUP, 1 x SDLP

1993-1997 change: Independent Nationalist (two seats) gain from DUP and Alliance

Portadown - 7 seats
Party	Candidate	FPv%	Count								
Party	Candidate	FPv%	1	2	3	4	5	6	7	8	9
DUP	Mervyn Carrick*	21.22%	1,713								
Ind. Nationalist	Breandán Mac Cionnaith	18.49%	1,493								
UUP	James Gillespie*	14.90%	1,203								
UUP	Joseph Trueman*	11.38%	919	994.85	994.85	996.26	1,053.54				
SDLP	Ignatius Fox*	11.02%	890	891.64	928.76	934.17	934.65	1,025.65			
UUP	Mark Neale	6.38%	515	636.77	636.77	637.18	747.58	830.97	845.61	849.32	1,049.84
Ind. Nationalist	Joe Duffy	5.10%	412	413.23	840.43	840.43	840.43	861.27	861.27	870.28	870.28
UUP	David Thompson	5.00%	404	447.46	447.46	448.46	465.42	566.36	591.68	593.8	820.12
DUP	John Tate*	1.64%	132	564.96	564.96	566.37	570.05	584.42	586.22	586.75	
Alliance	William Ramsay*	4.62%	373	382.43	387.87	395.19	397.11				
Labour Coalition	Carol Lindsay	0.24%	19	20.64	20.96						
Electorate: 13,916 Valid: 8,073 (58.01%) Spoilt: 169 Quota: 1,010 Turnout: 8,242 (59.23%)

== 1993 election ==
1989: 4 x UUP, 1 x DUP, 1 x SDLP, 1 x Alliance

1993: 3 x UUP, 2 x DUP, 1 x SDLP, 1 x Alliance

1989-1993 change: DUP gain from UUP

Portadown - 7 seats
Party	Candidate	FPv%	Count					
Party	Candidate	FPv%	1	2	3	4	5	6
DUP	Mervyn Carrick	18.96%	1,419					
SDLP	Ignatius Fox*	18.39%	1,377					
UUP	James Gillespie*	17.98%	1,346					
UUP	Joseph Trueman*	13.40%	1,003					
UUP	Brian Maguinness*	7.20%	539	611.08	613.42	924.97	1,229.97	
Alliance	William Ramsay*	8.01%	600	612.92	919.07	928.06	963.06	
DUP	John Tate	3.82%	286	636.54	636.93	650.88	749.74	921.24
Sinn Féin	John Dunbar	6.99%	523	523.34	647.36	647.98	650.33	650.33
UUP	Anna Moore*	5.25%	393	427	427.39	498.07		
Electorate: 13,876 Valid: 7,486 (53.95%) Spoilt: 171 Quota: 936 Turnout: 7,657 (55.18%)

== 1989 election ==
1985: 3 x UUP, 2 x DUP, 1 x SDLP, 1 x Sinn Féin

1989: 4 x UUP, 1 x DUP, 1 x SDLP, 1 x Alliance

1985-1989 change: UUP and Alliance gain from DUP and Sinn Féin

Portadown - 7 seats
Party	Candidate	FPv%	Count								
Party	Candidate	FPv%	1	2	3	4	5	6	7	8	9
UUP	James Gillespie*	19.53%	1,583								
DUP	Michael Briggs*	13.43%	1,089								
SDLP	Ignatius Fox*	13.21%	1,071								
UUP	Joseph Trueman	10.94%	887	1,055.12							
UUP	Brian Maguinness	9.00%	730	1,021.96							
UUP	Anna Moore	5.54%	449	510.56	517.28	519.35	519.41	662.9	663.26	697.37	1,066.37
Alliance	William Ramsay	7.15%	580	586.84	588.31	615.31	640.45	647.71	769.43	770.78	832.59
Sinn Féin	John Dignam	6.45%	523	523.36	523.57	551.57	563.45	563.58	706.7	706.79	706.86
Protestant Unionist	Andrew Watson	6.30%	511	520.36	526.03	528.03	528.03	638.82	640.89	643.41	
Ind. Nationalist	Mario McCooe	4.45%	361	361.36	361.43	393.43	410.77	410.77			
DUP	Phyllis Lutton	2.58%	209	238.16	297.38	298.38	298.44				
Workers' Party	Kathy Fox	1.41%	114	114.36	114.43						
Electorate: 13,753 Valid: 8,107 (58.95%) Spoilt: 220 Quota: 1,014 Turnout: 8,327 (60.55%)

== 1985 election ==
1985: 3 x UUP, 2 x DUP, 1 x SDLP, 1 x Sinn Féin

Portadown - 7 seats
Party	Candidate	FPv%	Count								
Party	Candidate	FPv%	1	2	3	4	5	6	7	8	9
DUP	Gladys McCullough*	16.87%	1,470								
UUP	James Gillespie*	15.36%	1,338								
UUP	Arnold Hatch*	13.06%	1,138								
UUP	Alan Locke*	7.16%	624	664.04	734.6	734.6	1,070.34	1,109.34			
SDLP	Ignatius Fox	9.02%	786	786	786.18	810.18	810.18	810.18	1,167.18		
DUP	Michael Briggs	8.79%	766	898.34	908.24	908.24	943.76	946.24	946.24	946.24	1,225.24
Sinn Féin	Brian McCann	8.22%	716	716	716.18	981.18	981.18	981.22	1,044.22	1,076.12	1,076.12
Alliance	William Ramsay*	5.81%	506	520.3	525.52	527.52	547.44	549.24	588.24	632.32	689.42
DUP	Ronald Williamson	3.75%	327	493.66	501.22	501.22	519.66	521.18	522.36	522.65	
SDLP	Mario McCooe	5.30%	462	462	462.18	487.18	488.18	488.18			
UUP	Robert Hughes	2.90%	253	277.7	420.98	420.98					
Sinn Féin	Sean Dunbar	3.74%	326	326	326						
Electorate: 13,741 Valid: 8,712 (63.40%) Spoilt: 191 Quota: 1,090 Turnout: 8,903 (64.79%)
