= Loughside (District Electoral Area) =

District electoral areas in Craigavon, Northern Ireland

Loughside DEA (1993-2014) within Craigavon

Loughside was one of the four district electoral areas in Craigavon, Northern Ireland which existed from 1985 to 2014. The district elected five members to Craigavon Borough Council, and formed part of the Upper Bann constituencies for the Northern Ireland Assembly and UK Parliament.

It was created for the 1985 local elections, replacing Craigavon Area A which had existed since 1973, and contained the wards of Aghagallon, Court, Drumnamoe, Kinnegoe and Woodville. It was abolished for the 2014 local elections and divided between the Craigavon DEA and the Lurgan DEA.

== Councillors ==
Election	Councillor (Party)	Councillor (Party)	Councillor (Party)	Councillor (Party)	Councillor (Party)
2011	Mairéad O'Dowd (Sinn Féin)	Johnny McGibbon (Sinn Féin)	Noel McGeown (Sinn Féin)	Declan McAlinden (SDLP)	Joe Nelson (SDLP)
2005	Mairéad O'Dowd (Sinn Féin)	Leah Small (Sinn Féin)	Michael Tallon (Sinn Féin)	Mary McAlinden (SDLP)	Dolores Kelly (SDLP)
2001	John O'Dowd (Sinn Féin)	Maurice Magill (Sinn Féin)	Sean McCavanagh (SDLP)	Mary McAlinden (SDLP)	Dolores Kelly (SDLP)
1997	John O'Dowd (Sinn Féin)	Kieran McGeown (SDLP)	Sean McCavanagh (SDLP)	Mary McAlinden (SDLP)	Dolores Kelly (SDLP)
1993	Brendan McConville (Sinn Féin)	Peter Smyth (Workers' Party)	Sean McCavanagh (SDLP)	Hugh Casey (SDLP)	Dolores Kelly (SDLP)
1989	Brendan Curran (Sinn Féin)	Tom French (Workers' Party)	Sean McCavanagh (SDLP)	Hugh Casey (SDLP)	Catherine McStravick (SDLP)
1985	Brendan Curran (Sinn Féin)	Padraig Breen (Workers' Party)	Sean McCavanagh (SDLP)	Peter Bunting (SDLP)	Thomas Bell (UUP)

== 2011 Election ==
2005: 3 x Sinn Féin, 2 x SDLP

2011: 3 x Sinn Féin, 2 x SDLP

2005-2011 Change: No change

Loughside - 5 seats
Party	Candidate	FPv%	Count					
Party	Candidate	FPv%	1	2	3	4	5	6
Sinn Féin	Johnny McGibbon	32.38%	2,465					
Sinn Féin	Mairéad O'Dowd*	10.67%	812	1,477.42				
SDLP	Declan McAlinden	13.99%	1,065	1,117.43	1,151.43	1,176.63	1,286.63	
SDLP	Joe Nelson	8.82%	671	701.87	776.77	787.21	831.88	1,282.88
Sinn Féin	Noel McGeown	9.66%	735	978.53	1,007.98	1,107.34	1,108.34	1,157.81
Sinn Féin	Maurice Magill	7.26%	553	712.25	724.25	781.49	785.85	862.91
SDLP	Caoimhe Dummigan	7.74%	589	619.87	643.87	657.01	729.01	
DUP	Philip Carson	6.53%	497	497.49	517.49	518.03		
Independent	Mal Nelson	2.96%	225	235.78				
Electorate: 13,346 Valid: 7,612 (57.04%) Spoilt: 201 Quota: 1,269 Turnout: 7,813 (58.54%)

== 2005 Election ==
2001: 3 x SDLP, 2 x Sinn Féin

2005: 3 x Sinn Féin, 2 x SDLP

2001–2005 Change: Sinn Féin gain from SDLP

Loughside - 5 seats
Party	Candidate	FPv%	Count			
Party	Candidate	FPv%	1	2	3	4
Sinn Féin	Mairéad O'Dowd	29.17%	2,183			
SDLP	Dolores Kelly*	21.71%	1,625			
Sinn Féin	Leah Small	8.67%	649	1,263.24		
SDLP	Mary McAlinden*	8.50%	636	736.76	944.36	1,178.72
Sinn Féin	Michael Tallon	12.67%	948	1,092.32	1,108.88	1,153.6
SDLP	Anthony Elliott	9.09%	680	719.16	842.52	994
UUP	Joy Savage	4.09%	306	309.52	313.84	
DUP	Ivan Russell	4.04%	302	302.44	302.92	
Workers' Party	Tom French	2.07%	155	185.36	205.52	
Electorate: 12,354 Valid: 7,484 (60.58%) Spoilt: 228 Quota: 1,248 Turnout: 7,712 (62.43%)

== 2001 Election ==
1997: 4 x SDLP, 1 x Sinn Féin

2001: 3 x SDLP, 2 x Sinn Féin

1997-2001 Change: Sinn Féin gain from SDLP

Loughside - 5 seats
Party	Candidate	FPv%	Count					
Party	Candidate	FPv%	1	2	3	4	5	6
SDLP	Dolores Kelly*	22.84%	2,022					
Sinn Féin	John O'Dowd*	22.27%	1,971					
SDLP	Sean McCavanagh*	11.92%	1,055	1,214.04	1,232.54	1,235.82	1,392.52	1,449.92
Sinn Féin	Maurice Magill	12.78%	1,131	1,175.24	1,376.49	1,378.49	1,394.23	1,404.51
SDLP	Mary McAlinden*	8.30%	735	996.8	1,010.55	1,013.55	1,212.21	1,401.45
Sinn Féin	Mairéad O'Dowd	9.98%	883	904.56	1,144.56	1,145.56	1,167.71	1,168.71
UUP	William Lindsay	4.89%	433	437.48	437.48	641.48	642.48	
SDLP	Kieran McGeown*	4.07%	360	411.24	417.99	417.99		
DUP	Alexander Dougan	2.95%	261	261.28	261.28			
Electorate: 12,545 Valid: 8,851 (70.55%) Spoilt: 255 Quota: 1,476 Turnout: 9,106 (72.59%)

== 1997 Election ==
1993: 3 x SDLP, 1 x Sinn Féin, 1 x Workers' Party

1997: 4 x SDLP, 1 x Sinn Féin

1993-1997 Change: SDLP gain from Workers' Party

Loughside - 5 seats
Party	Candidate	FPv%	Count							
Party	Candidate	FPv%	1	2	3	4	5	6	7	8
Sinn Féin	John O'Dowd*	35.26%	2,320							
SDLP	Sean McCavanagh*	22.80%	1,500							
SDLP	Dolores Kelly*	10.52%	692	926.96	1,019.03	1,021.79	1,030.94	1,077.05	1,134.05	
SDLP	Mary McAlinden	8.54%	562	830.4	922.2	929.14	942.59	979.61	1,022.58	1,125.58
SDLP	Kieran McGeown	5.15%	339	755.24	923.18	931	938.03	974.87	1,015.23	1,065.23
UUP	Thomas Crozier	7.16%	471	471	471.54	471.54	487.54	566.54	572.54	575.54
Workers' Party	Tom French	3.44%	226	358.88	371.3	378.97	391.15	406.95	491.98	
Labour Coalition	Hugh Casey*	3.09%	203	258.44	270.86	274.04	279.04	294.83		
Labour Coalition	Mark McKavanagh	1.54%	101	161.72	173.33	179.12	186			
DUP	Anne Hanlon	1.35%	89	90.76	90.76	90.76	90.76			
Alliance	Adrian McKinney	0.94%	62	77.84	80.27	84.15				
Labour Coalition	Mary Sheen	0.21%	14	47.44	50.14					
Electorate: 11,783 Valid: 6,579 (55.83%) Spoilt: 109 Quota: 1,097 Turnout: 6,688 (56.76%)

== 1993 Election ==
1989: 3 x SDLP, 1 x Sinn Féin, 1 x Workers' Party

1993: 3 x SDLP, 1 x Sinn Féin, 1 x Workers' Party

1989-1993 Change: No change

Loughside - 5 seats
Party	Candidate	FPv%	Count					
Party	Candidate	FPv%	1	2	3	4	5	6
SDLP	Sean McCavanagh*	25.49%	1,470					
SDLP	Hugh Casey*	22.43%	1,294					
Sinn Féin	Brendan McConville	21.86%	1,261					
SDLP	Dolores Kelly	14.16%	817	1,272.1				
Workers' Party	Peter Smyth	3.90%	225	264.59	584.17	757.7	761.39	994.39
UUP	Thomas Crozier	9.83%	567	568.11	573.33	577.77	700.83	708.83
DUP	Anne Hanlon	2.32%	134	135.85	141.07	141.81		
Electorate: 11,256 Valid: 5,768 (51.24%) Spoilt: 213 Quota: 962 Turnout: 5,981 (53.14%)

== 1989 Election ==
1985: 2 x SDLP, 1 x Sinn Féin, 1 x Workers' Party, 1 x UUP

1989: 3 x SDLP, 1 x Sinn Féin, 1 x Workers' Party

1985-1989 Change: SDLP gain from UUP

Loughside - 5 seats
Party	Candidate	FPv%	Count					
Party	Candidate	FPv%	1	2	3	4	5	6
SDLP	Sean McCavanagh*	23.79%	1,393					
Sinn Féin	Brendan Curran*	10.81%	633	640	1,048.5			
SDLP	Hugh Casey	12.88%	754	867.7	870.7	1,054.7		
SDLP	Catherine McStravick	10.30%	603	749.7	763.3	994		
Workers' Party	Tom French*	12.18%	713	747.8	762.4	834.7	912.05	977.05
UUP	Thomas Bell*	14.70%	861	861.9	863.9	863.9	864.81	867.81
SDLP	Patrick Crilly	7.24%	424	521.5	529.7			
Sinn Féin	John O'Dowd	8.11%	475	480.4				
Electorate: 10,783 Valid: 5,856 (54.31%) Spoilt: 191 Quota: 976 Turnout: 6,047 (56.08%)

== 1985 Election ==
1985: 2 x SDLP, 1 x Sinn Féin, 1 x Workers' Party, 1 x UUP

Loughside - 5 seats
Party	Candidate	FPv%	Count						
Party	Candidate	FPv%	1	2	3	4	5	6	7
SDLP	Sean McCavanagh*	17.01%	990						
Workers' Party	Padraig Breen*	16.10%	937	1,028					
UUP	Thomas Bell	11.50%	669	671	1,049				
Sinn Féin	Brendan Curran	14.38%	837	839	839	839	857.6	1,328.6	
SDLP	Peter Bunting	13.78%	802	820	820	844	866.32	880.32	929.32
SDLP	Patrick Crilly*	9.54%	555	565	565	576	589.02	600.88	655.88
Sinn Féin	Michael McKee	8.87%	516	520	521	521	524.72		
DUP	Robert Russell	6.56%	382	382					
Workers' Party	Karen McStravick	2.25%	131						
Electorate: 9,941 Valid: 5,819 (58.54%) Spoilt: 227 Quota: 970 Turnout: 6,046 (60.82%)
