= Upper Bann =

Upper Bann may refer to:

- Upper Bann (Assembly constituency), in the Northern Ireland Assembly
- Upper Bann (UK Parliament constituency), in the United Kingdom House of Commons
