= 1989 Craigavon Borough Council election =

Local government election in Northern Ireland

← 1985	17 May 1989	1993 →

All 26 seats to Craigavon Borough Council 14 seats needed for a majority
	First party	Second party	Third party
Party	UUP	SDLP	DUP
Seats won	12	6	4
Seat change	▲1	▲1	▼2
	Fourth party	Fifth party	Sixth party
Party	Alliance	Sinn Féin	Workers' Party
Seats won	2	1	1
Seat change	▲2	▼1	▼1

Elections to Craigavon Borough Council were held on 17 May 1989 on the same day as the other Northern Irish local government elections. The election used four district electoral areas to elect a total of 26 councillors.

== Election results ==
Craigavon Borough Council Election Result 1989
Party	Seats	Gains	Losses	Net gain/loss	Seats %	Votes %	Votes	+/−
UUP	12	2	1	▲1	46.2	42.4	12,687	▲6.3
SDLP	6	1	0	▲1	23.1	21.0	6,288	▲3.8
DUP	4	0	2	▼2	15.4	14.4	4,314	▼11.3
Alliance	2	2	0	▲2	7.7	5.8	1,742	▲1.5
Sinn Féin	1	0	1	▼1	3.8	8.4	2,521	▼3.1
Workers' Party	1	0	1	▼1	3.8	4.3	1,285	▼0.9
Protestant Unionist	0	0	0	0	0.0	1.7	511	New
Ind. Nationalist	0	0	0	0	0.0	1.2	361	▲1.2
Ind. Unionist	0	0	0	0	0.0	0.8	255	▲0.8

Note: "Votes" are the first preference votes.

== Districts summary ==
Results of the Craigavon Borough Council election, 1989 by district
Ward	%	Cllrs	%	Cllrs	%	Cllrs	%	Cllrs	%	Cllrs	%	Cllrs	%	Cllrs	Total Cllrs
Ward	UUP		SDLP		DUP		Alliance		Sinn Féin		Workers' Party		Others		Total Cllrs
Craigavon Central	45.0	4	13.2	1	17.5	1	8.0	1	8.1	0	4.9	0	3.3	0	7
Loughside	14.7	0	54.2	3	0.0	0	0.0	0	18.9	1	12.2	1	0.0	0	5
Lurgan	56.6	4	12.3	1	20.1	2	6.6	0	3.3	0	1.1	0	0.0	0	7
Portadown	45.0	4	13.2	1	16.0	2	7.2	1	6.4	0	1.4	0	10.8	0	7
Total	42.4	12	21.0	6	14.4	4	5.8	2	8.4	1	4.3	1	3.7	0	26

== District results ==
=== Craigavon Central ===
1985: 3 x UUP, 2 x DUP, 1 x SDLP, 1 x Workers' Party
1989: 4 x UUP, 2 x DUP, 1 x SDLP, 1 x Alliance
1985-1989 Change: UUP and Alliance gain from DUP and Workers' Party

Craigavon Central - 7 seats
Party	Candidate	FPv%	Count							
Party	Candidate	FPv%	1	2	3	4	5	6	7	8
UUP	Samuel McCammick*	21.69%	1,642							
SDLP	James Daly	13.25%	1,003							
UUP	Frederick Crowe	10.74%	813	1,079.29						
DUP	David Calvin	12.09%	915	936.84	945.24	1,068.24				
UUP	Pauline Lindsay	6.54%	495	637.8	700.17	750.9	792.9	798.32	997.32	
UUP	Elizabeth McClurg	6.04%	457	651.04	697.87	719.55	728.55	733.97	951.31	
Alliance	Sean Hagan	7.99%	605	614.24	615.29	627.29	632.29	793.29	799.34	840.22
Sinn Féin	Sheena Campbell	8.06%	610	610	610.21	612.21	614.21	744.21	744.21	759.05
DUP	Eric Patterson	5.36%	406	451.36	462.28	495.12	555.12	559.12		
Workers' Party	Peter Smyth	4.89%	370	370.84	371.05	373.05	373.05			
Ind. Unionist	Barrie Bradbury	3.37%	255	259.62	261.09					
Electorate: 13,988 Valid: 7,571 (54.12%) Spoilt: 205 Quota: 947 Turnout: 7,776 (55.59%)

=== Loughside ===
1985: 2 x SDLP, 1 x Sinn Féin, 1 x Workers' Party, 1 x UUP
1989: 3 x SDLP, 1 x Sinn Féin, 1 x Workers' Party
1985-1989 Change: SDLP gain from UUP

Loughside - 5 seats
Party	Candidate	FPv%	Count					
Party	Candidate	FPv%	1	2	3	4	5	6
SDLP	Sean McCavanagh*	23.79%	1,393					
Sinn Féin	Brendan Curran*	10.81%	633	640	1,048.5			
SDLP	Hugh Casey	12.88%	754	867.7	870.7	1,054.7		
SDLP	Catherine McStravick	10.30%	603	749.7	763.3	994		
Workers' Party	Tom French*	12.18%	713	747.8	762.4	834.7	912.05	977.05
UUP	Thomas Bell*	14.70%	861	861.9	863.9	863.9	864.81	867.81
SDLP	Patrick Crilly	7.24%	424	521.5	529.7			
Sinn Féin	John O'Dowd	8.11%	475	480.4				
Electorate: 10,783 Valid: 5,856 (54.31%) Spoilt: 191 Quota: 976 Turnout: 6,047 (56.08%)

=== Lurgan ===
1985: 4 x UUP, 2 x DUP, 1 x SDLP
1989: 4 x UUP, 2 x DUP, 1 x SDLP
1985-1989 Change: No change

Lurgan - 7 seats
Party	Candidate	FPv%	Count				
Party	Candidate	FPv%	1	2	3	4	5
UUP	Sydney Cairns*	23.04%	1,942				
UUP	Audrey Savage	18.56%	1,565				
UUP	Samuel Lutton	9.15%	771	1,127.5			
UUP	Meta Crozier	5.84%	492	886.22	1,236.68		
DUP	Ruth Allen	10.57%	891	924.12	979.56	1,077.31	
SDLP	Brid Rodgers*	12.34%	1,040	1,040	1,040.33	1,041.02	1,249.02
DUP	Yvonne Calvert	9.54%	804	884.5	864.69	1,029.32	1,033.21
Alliance	Gordon Burrell	6.61%	557	572.64	586.17	604.34	623.67
Sinn Féin	Patricia McKee	3.32%	280	280	280.66	280.89	
Workers' Party	Maureen McKeever	1.04%	88	88	88.99	89.45	
Electorate: 13,861 Valid: 8,430 (60.82%) Spoilt: 194 Quota: 1,054 Turnout: 8,624 (62.22%)

=== Portadown ===
1985: 3 x UUP, 2 x DUP, 1 x SDLP, 1 x Sinn Féin
1989: 4 x UUP, 1 x DUP, 1 x SDLP, 1 x Alliance
1985-1989 Change: UUP and Alliance gain from DUP and Sinn Féin

Portadown - 7 seats
Party	Candidate	FPv%	Count								
Party	Candidate	FPv%	1	2	3	4	5	6	7	8	9
UUP	James Gillespie*	19.53%	1,583								
DUP	Michael Briggs*	13.43%	1,089								
SDLP	Ignatius Fox*	13.21%	1,071								
UUP	Joseph Trueman	10.94%	887	1,055.12							
UUP	Brian Maguinness	9.00%	730	1,021.96							
UUP	Anna Moore	5.54%	449	510.56	517.28	519.35	519.41	662.9	663.26	697.37	1,066.37
Alliance	William Ramsay	7.15%	580	586.84	588.31	615.31	640.45	647.71	769.43	770.78	832.59
Sinn Féin	John Dignam	6.45%	523	523.36	523.57	551.57	563.45	563.58	706.7	706.79	706.86
Protestant Unionist	Andrew Watson	6.30%	511	520.36	526.03	528.03	528.03	638.82	640.89	643.41	
Ind. Nationalist	Mario McCooe	4.45%	361	361.36	361.43	393.43	410.77	410.77			
DUP	Phyllis Lutton	2.58%	209	238.16	297.38	298.38	298.44				
Workers' Party	Kathy Fox	1.41%	114	114.36	114.43						
Electorate: 13,753 Valid: 8,107 (58.95%) Spoilt: 220 Quota: 1,014 Turnout: 8,327 (60.55%)
