= Catherine Nelson =

Northern Irish politician

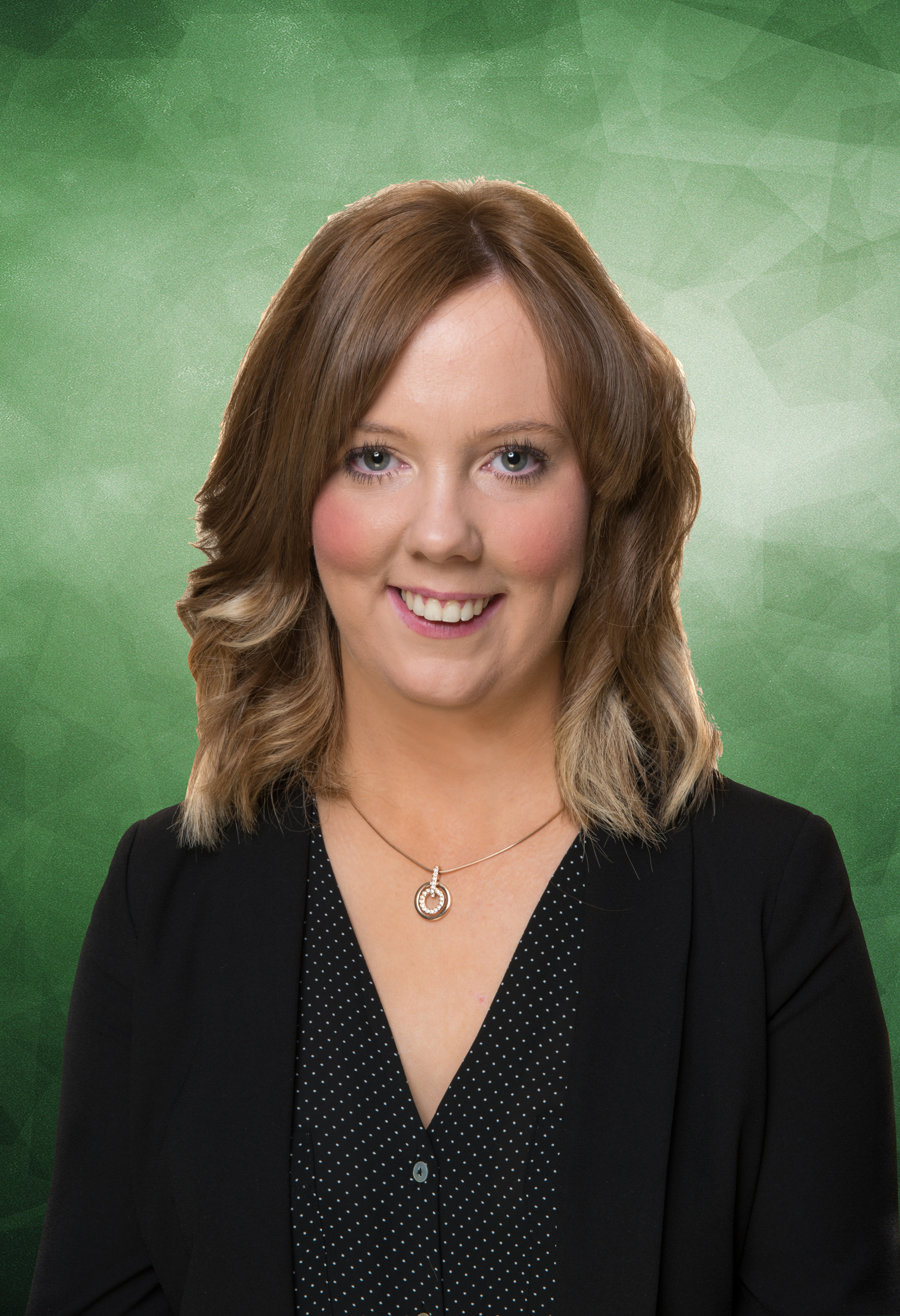
- Nelson in 2015

Member of Armagh City, Banbridge and Craigavon District Council
- Incumbent
- Assumed office 2 May 2019
- Preceded by: Fergal Lennon
- Constituency: Craigavon
- In office 19 June 2018 – 2 May 2019
- Preceded by: Máire Cairns
- Succeeded by: Sorchá McGeown
- Constituency: Lurgan
- In office 22 May 2014 – 5 May 2016
- Preceded by: Council established
- Succeeded by: Liam Mackle
- Constituency: Lurgan

Member of the Northern Ireland Assembly for Upper Bann
- In office 5 May 2016 – January 2017
- Preceded by: Dolores Kelly
- Succeeded by: Dolores Kelly

Member of Craigavon Borough Council
- In office 25 January 2014 – 22 May 2014
- Preceded by: Johnny McGibbon
- Succeeded by: Council abolished
- Constituency: Loughside

Personal details
- Born: 26 November 1987 (age 38) Lurgan, Northern Ireland
- Party: Sinn Féin
- Education: Queen's University Belfast
- Profession: Teacher

Catherine Nelson (born Catherine Seeley; 26 November 1987) is an Irish Sinn Féin politician and schoolteacher, serving as an Armagh City, Banbridge and Craigavon councillor for the Craigavon DEA since 2019.

Nelson was previously a Member of the Legislative Assembly (MLA) for Upper Bann from the 2016 to 2017.

== Background ==
Previously a schoolteacher at the non-denominational Belfast Boys' Model School, she resigned after allegedly enduring a campaign of harassment, which began after she was co-opted as a Sinn Féin councillor on Craigavon Borough Council in 2014. The Protestant Coalition opposed her employment at the school over her affiliation with Sinn Féin.

In October 2014, she was the Sinn Féin candidate at the 2014 Seanad by-election. At the 2016 Northern Ireland Assembly election, she was elected as one of two Sinn Fein representatives for the Upper Bann constituency.

On 16 January 2017, it was announced she would not seeking re-election at the 2017 assembly election and would return to work as a schoolteacher.

In 2018, she was co-opted as a councillor onto Armagh City, Banbridge and Craigavon Borough Council.

On 25 May 2024, Nelson was announced as the Sinn Fein candidate for Upper Bann in the 2024 United Kingdom general election. She came second in the poll to Carla Lockhart.

Northern Ireland Assembly
Preceded by Dolores Kelly	MLA for Upper Bann; 2016–2017	Succeeded by Dolores Kelly
