= Sydney Anderson (Northern Ireland politician) =

Northern Ireland politician

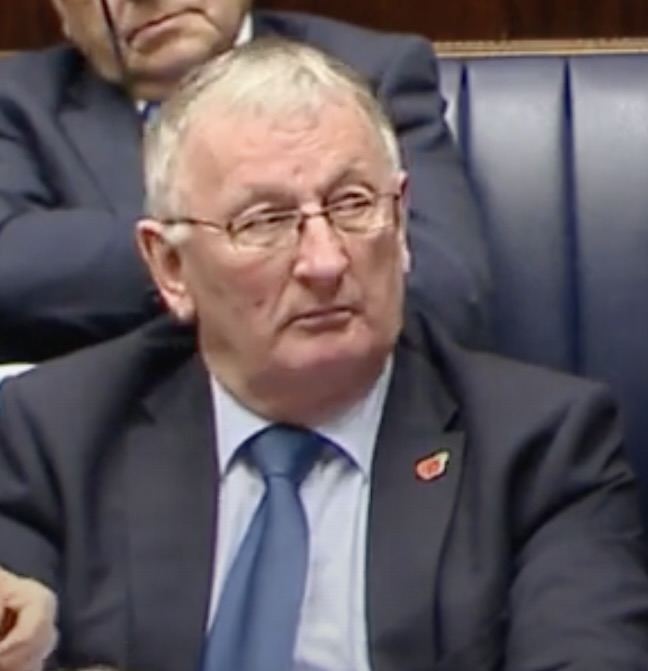
- Anderson in 2015

Member of Armagh City, Banbridge and Craigavon Borough Council
- In office 2 May 2019 – 18 May 2023
- Preceded by: Louise Templeton
- Succeeded by: Alan Mulholland
- Constituency: Portadown

Member of the Northern Ireland Assembly for Upper Bann
- In office 1 July 2010 – January 2017
- Preceded by: David Simpson
- Succeeded by: Jonathan Buckley

Member of Craigavon Borough Council
- In office 7 June 2001 – 22 May 2014
- Preceded by: Mervyn Carrick
- Succeeded by: Council abolished
- Constituency: Portadown

Personal details
- Born: Sydney Alexander Anderson; 23 April 1949 (age 76) Portadown, Northern Ireland
- Party: Democratic Unionist Party (Since 2005); Independent Unionist (2003 - 2005)
- Other political affiliations: Ulster Unionist Party (until 2003)
- Spouse: Brenda Anderson
- Profession: Businessman

Alderman Sydney Alexander Anderson (born 23 April 1949) is a former Democratic Unionist Party (DUP) politician who was an Armagh, Banbridge and Craigavon Borough Councillor for the Portadown DEA from 2019 to 2023. He previously served as a Member of the Northern Ireland Assembly (MLA) for Upper Bann from 2010 to 2017.

== Career ==
Anderson was elected to Craigavon Borough Council as an Ulster Unionist Party (UUP) representative for the Portadown DEA in the 2001 Council election.

Anderson resigned from the UUP ahead of the 2003 Northern Ireland Assembly election, and stood as an independent candidate in Upper Bann, polling 581 votes (1.34%).

Before the 2005 local elections, he joined the Democratic Unionist Party (DUP). He retained his council seat in that election.

Anderson has also served as Mayor and Deputy Mayor of Craigavon Borough Council.

In July 2010, he was co-opted to the Northern Ireland Assembly, replacing David Simpson in Upper Bann.

Regarding the choice, Anderson said "I want first of all to pay tribute to both Robert and Philip who were both very able candidates. It would have been a pleasure to have had either of them at the Assembly and to have worked on their behalf."

Anderson was subsequently re-elected to Craigavon Borough Council election at the 2011 local elections, topping the poll in the Portadown District.

He was a member of the All Party Group on Neurology, Public Accounts Committee and Committee for Justice in the Assembly. He had been a member of the Committee for Social Development, Committee for Employment and Learning and Committee on Standards and Privileges.

Anderson did not seek re-election at the 2017 assembly election.

He was later elected onto Armagh City, Banbridge and Craigavon Borough Council in the 2019 local elections, representing Portadown again. He retired as a councillor at the 2023 local elections.

Civic offices
| Preceded by Robert Smith | Mayor of Craigavon; 2008–2009 | Succeeded by Meta Crozier |
Northern Ireland Assembly
| Preceded by David Simpson | MLA for Upper Bann; 2010–2017 | Succeeded by Jonathan Buckley |
