= Jonathan Buckley =

DUP politician from Northern Ireland

Jonathan Buckley MLA
- Buckley in 2024

Member of the Northern Ireland Assembly for Upper Bann
- Incumbent
- Assumed office 3 March 2017
- Preceded by: Sydney Anderson

Member of Armagh City, Banbridge and Craigavon Borough Council
- In office 22 May 2014 – 3 March 2017
- Preceded by: Council created
- Succeeded by: Louise Templeton
- Constituency: Portadown

Personal details
- Born: 19 July 1991 (age 35) County Armagh, Northern Ireland
- Party: DUP
- Spouse: Jill Porter (m. 2022)
- Occupation: Politician

Jonathan Buckley (born 19 July 1991) is a Democratic Unionist Party (DUP) politician who has been a Member of the Northern Ireland Assembly (MLA) for Upper Bann since 2017. He currently serves as the DUP's Spokesman for Economy, Business, and Energy and Trade Union Engagement.

== Early life ==
Jonathan Buckley was born in 1991 in Craigavon, County Armagh, Northern Ireland, one of five children of Glen, a factory worker, and Martha, a homemaker. He grew up in a unionist family in Portadown. Buckley's great‑grandfather, William Hamill, received the Queen's Gallantry Medal for an incident at the Crown Buildings in Armagh in 1975. Hamill was working as a security officer when a bomb was planted there; after the attackers left, he removed the device from the building and the Army made it safe.

Buckley was educated at Richmount Primary School and later at Clounagh Junior High School, Craigavon Senior High School and Lurgan College, where he completed his A‑Levels. He went on to Queen's University Belfast to study politics and international studies.

== Political career ==
Before entering the Northern Ireland Assembly, Buckley served as a Local Councillor for Portadown DEA within the Armagh, Banbridge & Craigavon Borough Council. During his time in local government, he was a member of various committees, including Economic Development, Governance, and Policy and Planning.

Buckley has been a member of the Northern Ireland Assembly (MLA) for Upper Bann since 2017. He succeeded retiring veteran legislator Sydney Anderson. During the campaign, he publicly exhorted voters in the constituency to vote and to transfer to other Unionist candidates. He was declared the winner on 3 March 2017. This made Buckley the youngest elected representative for the DUP.

In October 2021, Buckley voted against 'safe zones' outside abortion clinics, saying the move which supporters claim is designed to protect women from physical and verbal harassment was "regressive".

In May 2022, Buckley admitted that he was "surprised" to learn that he had been nominated by Anne Donaghy's office for an MBE for "political and public service".

In addition to his political roles, Buckley has been actively engaged in various leadership and educational programs. He participated in the British Council Future Leaders Connect Programme at Cambridge University, becoming part of a global network of emerging policy leaders. He was also selected by the United States Government for the International Visitor Leadership Program (IVLP), representing the United Kingdom in the Department of State Exchange Programme Global Economic Cooperation.

In 2023, Buckley stood for the Deputy Leadership of the DUP, losing by one vote to Gavin Robinson, the MP for East Belfast.

On 24 May 2024, Buckley was selected as the Democratic Unionist Party candidate for Lagan Valley in the 2024 United Kingdom general election, following the departure of Sir Jeffrey Donaldson. On standing for election, Buckley said:“I am running in Lagan Valley because I am putting country first. “I am running in Lagan Valley to ensure pro-union voters can unite behind a candidate and ensure Lagan Valley has strong representation at Westminster.” He finished second to Alliance's Sorcha Eastwood, who won the seat with a 2,659 (6.0%) majority compared to Buckley's 15,659 votes (31.9%).

== Personal life ==
Away from his political work, Buckley has interests in pigeon racing, country sports and football.

Buckley married schoolteacher Jill Porter at Lisburn Free Presbyterian Church on 1 July 2022. Their first child, a daughter, was born in November 2025.

Northern Ireland Assembly
Preceded by Sydney Anderson	MLA for Upper Bann; 2017–present	Incumbent
