= Jo-Anne Dobson =

Ulster Unionist politician (born 1966)

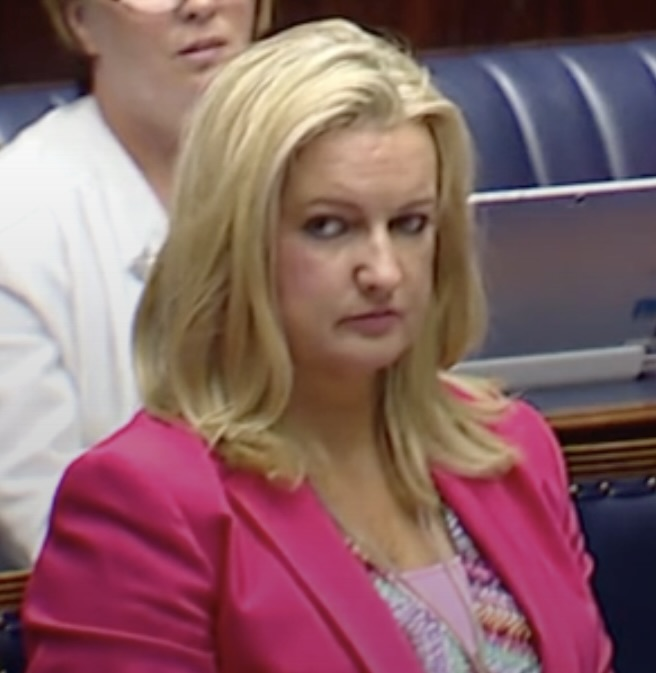
- Dobson in 2016

Member of the Northern Ireland Assembly for Upper Bann
- In office 12 May 2011 – 2 March 2017
- Preceded by: George Savage
- Succeeded by: Seat abolished

Member of Craigavon Borough Council
- In office 14 January 2010 – 2012
- Preceded by: Mark Russell
- Succeeded by: Colin McCusker
- Constituency: Lurgan

Personal details
- Born: Jo-Anne Elizabeth Elliott; 3 January 1966 (age 60) Banbridge, Northern Ireland
- Party: Ulster Unionist Party
- Spouse: John Dobson
- Children: two

Jo-Anne Elizabeth Dobson (née Elliott; born 3 January 1966) is a former Ulster Unionist Party (UUP) politician who was a Member of the Northern Ireland Assembly (MLA) for Upper Bann from 2011 to 2017. She took up the role as Northern Ireland Ambassador for charity Kidney Care UK in February 2018, and has promoted organ donation.

== Early life and education ==
Dobson began her education at Abercorn Primary School and continued her studies at Banbridge Academy. She is involved in charitable roles and in local environmental and farming scenes.

== Political career ==
Dobson was elected to Craigavon Borough Council in a by-election in 2010 - winning 64% of the vote. Upon her election to Stormont she stepped down from council in 2012, being replaced by Colin McCusker, General Secretary of the Ulster Unionist Party.

On 14 October 2014, Dobson was selected by the Upper Bann Ulster Unionist Association to be the party's candidate for the Upper Bann constituency in the 2015 general election. She won 13,166 votes, thus increasing the Ulster Unionist Party's percentage vote by 1.2% on the previous general election and coming second in what was a closely fought campaign.

Dobson was re-elected to the Northern Ireland Assembly in 2016, taking on new roles as the Chairperson of the Assembly Audit Committee and the Northern Ireland Assembly branch of the Commonwealth Parliamentary Association (CPA).

== Same sex marriage ==
In 2012, Dobson responded to a Christian organisation that claimed to be able to cure gay people and said she "would pray that marriage would not be redefined". In 2015, Dobson voted against a motion to legalise same sex marriage in Northern Ireland.

Also in 2015, Dobson voted in support of a motion to amend the equality bill to allow business owners an exemption on the grounds of their religious beliefs. This motion was in response to the Northern Ireland 'gay cake' row where Asher's Bakery refused to make a cake for a customer with a homosexual slogan. The 'conscience clause' as it is known has generated both support and some criticism within the media and from the equality commission.

== Organ donation ==
At five weeks old (May 1993) Dobson's son Mark was diagnosed with renal reflux which meant one of his kidneys had been lost and the other was reduced in function. In 2009 he underwent surgery to receive a donated kidney at the Royal Belfast Hospital for Sick Children. Dobson had been undergoing tests in late 2008 and early 2009 to become a live donor to her son when the call was received to inform them that a matched kidney had become available for Mark.

In December 2012 Dobson tabled a Private Member's Bill at the Northern Ireland Assembly to change the existing organ donation laws in Northern Ireland. In February 2013 she was elected as chairperson of the newly created Northern Ireland Assembly All-Party Group on Organ Donation. During the International TED conference, held at the Northern Ireland Assembly, she dedicated her speech to the memory of Josie Kerr, who, alongside her husband Walter, founded the Northern Ireland Kidney Research Fund, describing her as "an ordinary lady, who led an extraordinary life".

In 2017 Dobson's son Mark's transplanted kidney began to shut down. Dobson donated a kidney to her son in 2018.

In February 2018 Dobson took up the newly created role as Northern Ireland Ambassador for the UK's leading kidney patient support charity Kidney Care UK, running a leg of the Belfast City Marathon seven weeks after surgery to raise money to support kidney patients and their families.

== Personal life ==
Dobson is the eldest daughter of Joanie and Eric Elliott. She has a younger sister. She married John Dobson, a farmer, when she was 20. The family farm is on the outskirts of Waringstown, County Down. The couple have two sons.

Northern Ireland Assembly
| Preceded by George Savage | MLA for Upper Bann; 2011–2017 | Seat abolished |
