= Breandán Mac Cionnaith =

Irish political activist (born 1957)

Member of Craigavon Borough Council
- In office 21 May 1997 – 7 June 2001
- Preceded by: William Ramsay
- Succeeded by: Brian McKeown
- Constituency: Portadown

Personal details
- Born: 27 September 1957 (age 69) Lurgan, Northern Ireland
- Party: Éirígí (since 2007); Sinn Féin (before 2007)
- Other political affiliations: Independent Republican

Breandán Mac Cionnaith (also formerly known as Brendan McKenna; born 27 September 1957) is an Irish republican political activist and prominent residents' group leader. He came to prominence in the 1990s during the Drumcree conflict as spokesman for the Garvaghy Road Residents' Coalition, who sought to re-route Orange Order marches away from the mainly-Catholic part of Portadown. He was an elected councillor on Craigavon Borough Council from 1997 until 2001, and was also an adviser to Sinn Féin members of the Northern Ireland Assembly. Since 2007 he has been a member of Éirígí, a socialist republican party. In 1982, Mac Cionnaith was jailed for four years for his involvement in a Provisional IRA bombing.

== Early life ==
Breandán Mac Cionnaith was born in Lurgan in 1957. He moved to nearby Portadown, his wife's hometown, when they married in 1977.

On 5 August 1981, during the Irish republican hunger strike, Mac Cionnaith (then aged 23) was involved in the armed hijacking of a car from a family home, as part of a Provisional IRA operation. It was used in a car bomb attack that day on Portadown's Royal British Legion hall. The IRA sent a telephoned warning, and police evacuated the area before the bomb exploded, causing significant damage. Armed RUC officers surprised Mac Cionnaith as he fled the car-owner's home after the bombing. In 1982, he was sentenced to six years in prison for carrying a weapon with intent, hijacking, and false imprisonment, and served four years.

== Garvaghy Road Residents' Coalition ==
Mac Cionnaith was one of the founders of the Garvaghy Road Residents' Coalition (GRRC), which was formed in Portadown in May 1995 by representatives of the town's Catholic minority living on and around the Garvaghy Road. Its goal was to re-route marches by the Protestant Orange Order away from the Catholic district, through peaceful protest and lobbying. The long-running dispute, which saw numerous protests and riots, had led to Orange marches being banned from the mainly-Catholic Obins Street from 1987. The GRRC was made up of 12 representatives and they held regular public meetings with residents. Its first spokesman and secretary was Catholic priest Eamon Stack.

In July 1995, Mac Cionnaith led thousands of residents in a protest on the Garvaghy Road against the Orange Order march. As a result, security forces stopped the parade at Drumcree, sparking a violent standoff with thousands of Orangemen and loyalists. After two days, a compromise was reached, whereby some Orangemen would be allowed to march silently and without bands. The RUC deputy chief constable, Ronnie Flanagan, said that there would be no future Orange marches on Garvaghy Road. When Mac Cionnaith asked protesters to clear the road, some heckled and refused, but they eventually agreed to move. Mac Cionnaith was charged with obstructing the highway, but the case was dismissed the following June. In July 1996, the RUC blocked the Orange march from Garvaghy Road, sparking five days of loyalist violence. The RUC then reversed their decision and allowed the march. The GRRC had not been consulted and rioting erupted as riot police in armoured vehicles flooded the Garvaghy area and batoned hundreds of protesters off the road, hemming residents into their estates.

In May 1997, Mac Cionnaith was elected to Craigavon Borough Council as an Independent Nationalist councillor for Portadown. He also became spokesman for the GRRC that year. The Orange Order and Unionist politicians refused to negotiate with the GRRC, claiming it was controlled by Sinn Féin or the IRA, and highlighting that Mac Cionnaith was a "convicted terrorist".

Before dawn on the day of the July 1997 march, 1,500 riot police and soldiers suddenly swept into the Catholic area in armoured vehicles, seizing control of Garvaghy Road so the Orangemen could march along it. The RUC forced protesters away from the road, firing plastic bullets and beating them with batons, while protesters attacked riot police with stones, bricks and petrol bombs. After the security forces withdrew, Mac Cionnaith said to the crowd: "the RUC came in this morning to beat us into the ground. They thought we were beaten. Do you look like a defeated people? ... You have won the respect of people throughout Ireland".

The July 1998 Orange march was banned from Garvaghy Road, and the Catholic area was blocked off with large steel, concrete and razor wire barricades built by the British Army. A loyalist group issued a statement threatening to kill anyone supplying goods or services to the Garvaghy Road. It also threatened Mac Cionnaith, saying: "You, Mr McKenna, have contaminated the ground on which you walk long enough. Your day is almost over". That month, loyalists also put out a propaganda leaflet threatening Mac Cionnaith. Titled "The Man Without a Future", it calls him a murderer and claims he joined the IRA at school, spurred on by priests and nuns. It includes his contact details and ends, "Ask not for whom the bell tolls, it tolls for you McKenna". In 2002, he received another death threat and a live bullet in the post from the Orange Volunteers.

The GRRC's legal adviser, solicitor Rosemary Nelson, was assassinated by loyalists in a bomb attack in March 1999. Mac Cionnaith had been a friend of Nelson. He issued a statement following her assassination, saying the British government "bears a heavy responsibility" for her murder, for refusing requests to provide her with protection despite threats against her. On Garvaghy Road, several cars and a bus were burned out by protesters, and an RUC officer struck Mac Cionnaith on the eye with a baton during the unrest.

In an interview in July 1999, Mac Cionnaith said:

"The people of this area have made clear to Sinn Féin and the SDLP that the march must not be allowed to happen as part of the political deal. The people here are not pawns in a chess game. ... The hundreds of Orangemen who turn up here every year ... can go home whenever they want. These people live here. They have to put up with this stuff day in, day out. If we were a Jewish or a Muslim or a black community in London then there is no way Tony Blair would come down and tell us that we should be making concessions to the people responsible for all the bigotry against us".

After 1998, the yearly Orange march was banned from Garvaghy Road, and from 2002, tensions have been much reduced.

In September 2026, the Orange Order were granted permission to march on the Garvaghy Road for the first time in 28 years, reviving the dispute. Mac Cionnaith resumed his role as spokesman and lead negotiator for the Garvaghy Road Residents' Coalition and organised protesters in blocking the Garvaghy Road once again, preventing the march.

== Other activity ==
In the late 1990s, Mac Cionnaith taught Irish language evening classes and helped to set up an Irish nursery school in Portadown.

On 10 April 2007, Mac Cionnaith resigned from Sinn Féin, soon after the party decided to support the Police Service of Northern Ireland (PSNI). In February 2010, helped formulate a joint submission to the Northern Ireland Assembly's Working Party on Parading Issues.

He joined the socialist republican political party Éirígí and was elected General Secretary of the organisation in May 2009.
