= Stephen Moutray =

British politician (born 1959)

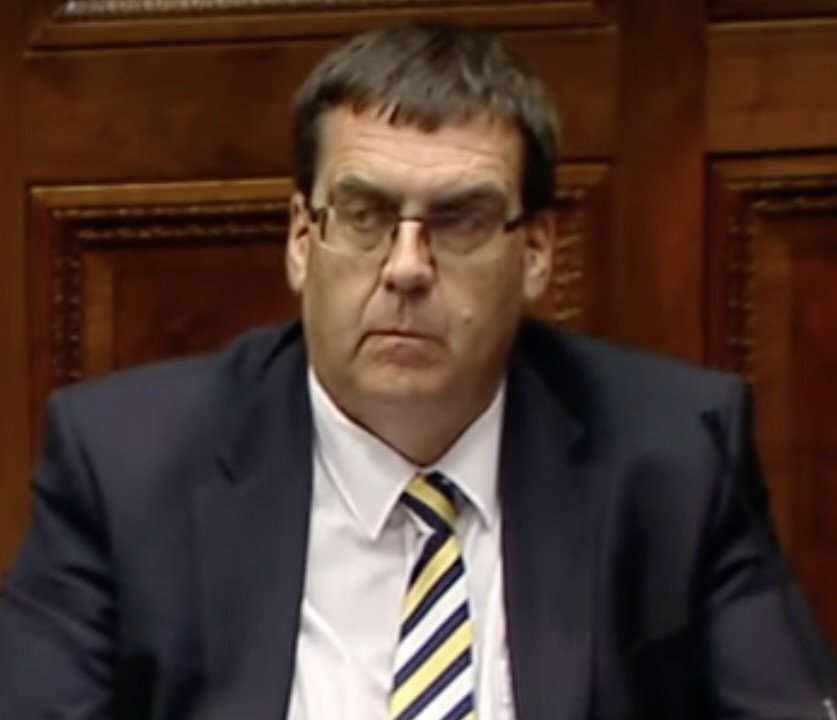
- Moutray in 2015

Member of Armagh City, Banbridge and Craigavon District Council
- Incumbent
- Assumed office December 2018
- Preceded by: Phillip Moutray
- Constituency: Lurgan

Member of the Northern Ireland Assembly for Upper Bann
- In office 26 November 2003 – 30 March 2016
- Preceded by: Denis Watson
- Succeeded by: Carla Lockhart

Mayor of Craigavon
- In office 2010–2011
- Preceded by: Meta Crozier
- Succeeded by: Alan Carson

Member of Craigavon Borough Council
- In office 7 June 2001 – 22 May 2014
- Preceded by: Ruth Allen
- Succeeded by: Council abolished
- Constituency: Lurgan

Personal details
- Born: 25 February 1959 (age 67) Enniskillen, County Fermanagh, Northern Ireland
- Party: Democratic Unionist Party
- Spouse: Myrtle
- Children: 3
- Website: DUP

Alderman Stephen William Moutray (born 25 February 1959) is a Democratic Unionist Party (DUP) politician, serving as an Armagh, Banbridge and Craigavon Borough Councillor for the Lurgan DEA since December 2018. He was a Member of the Legislative Assembly (MLA) for Upper Bann from 2003 to 2016. Moutray was also a Lurgan councillor on Craigavon Borough Council, from 2001 to 2014, where he served as Mayor from 2010 to 2011.

== Career ==
Moutray was first elected to Craigavon Borough Council, in the 2001 local elections, representing the Lurgan District. He was a member of all the major committees and additionally served as vice-chairman of Environmental Health Committee.

He was elected to the Northern Ireland Assembly at the 2003 election for Upper Bann.

Moutray stood down from the Assembly at the 2016 election.

He was later co-opted to the Lurgan District on Armagh City, Banbridge and Craigavon Borough Council in December 2018, succeeding Phillip Moutray.

Moutray was subsequently re-elected to the council at the 2019 council election, as well as in 2023.

== Personal life ==
Moutray was educated at Lurgan Junior High School and Lurgan College. After which he worked in his family business and then in the postal service. He has been a member of the Democratic Unionist Party since 1979. Married with 3 children, he has keen interest in golf, walking and cycling. He is an active member of the Free Presbyterian Church of Ulster.

Northern Ireland Assembly
Preceded by Denis Watson	MLA for Upper Bann; 2003–2016	Succeeded by Carla Lockhart
Civic offices
Preceded by Meta Crozier	Mayor of Craigavon; 2010–2011	Succeeded by Alan Carson
