= Upper Bann (Assembly constituency) =

Constituency of the Northern Ireland Assembly

Coordinates: 54.457°N 6.380°W

- Northern Ireland Assembly; Parliamentary constituency
- Upper Bann shown within Northern Ireland

Current constituency
- Created: 1996
- Seats: 6 (1996–2016); 5 (2017–)
- MLAs: Doug Beattie (Ind. U); Jonathan Buckley (DUP); Diane Dodds (DUP); John O'Dowd (SF); Eóin Tennyson (APNI)
- Districts: Armagh, Banbridge and Craigavon District Council

Upper Bann is a constituency in the Northern Ireland Assembly.

The seat was first used for a Northern Ireland-only election for the Northern Ireland Forum in 1996. Since 1998, it has elected members to the current Assembly.

For Assembly elections prior to 1996, the constituency was largely part of the Armagh and South Down constituencies with a small section around Aghagallon joining from South Antrim. Since 1997, it has shared boundaries with the Upper Bann UK Parliament constituency.

For further details of the history and boundaries of the constituency, see Upper Bann (UK Parliament constituency).

== Members ==
Election	MLA (party)	MLA (party)	MLA (party)	MLA (party)	MLA (party)	MLA (party)
1996	Michelle O'Connor (Sinn Féin)	Bríd Rodgers (SDLP)	Sam Gardiner (UUP)	David Trimble (UUP)	Mervyn Carrick (DUP)	5 seats 1996–1998
1998	Dara O'Hagan (Sinn Féin)	Bríd Rodgers (SDLP)	George Savage (UUP)	David Trimble (UUP)	Mervyn Carrick (DUP)	Denis Watson (Independent; Unionist)
2003	John O'Dowd (Sinn Féin)	Dolores Kelly (SDLP)	Sam Gardiner (UUP)	David Trimble (UUP)	Stephen Moutray (DUP)	David Simpson (DUP)
2007	John O'Dowd (Sinn Féin)	Dolores Kelly (SDLP)	Sam Gardiner (UUP)	George Savage (UUP)	Stephen Moutray (DUP)	David Simpson (DUP)
July 2010 co-option	John O'Dowd (Sinn Féin)	Dolores Kelly (SDLP)	Sam Gardiner (UUP)	George Savage (UUP)	Stephen Moutray (DUP)	Sydney Anderson (DUP)
2011	John O'Dowd (Sinn Féin)	Dolores Kelly (SDLP)	Sam Gardiner (UUP)	Jo-Anne Dobson (UUP)	Stephen Moutray (DUP)	Sydney Anderson (DUP)
2016	John O'Dowd (Sinn Féin)	Catherine Seeley (Sinn Féin)	Doug Beattie (UUP / Independent Unionist)	Jo-Anne Dobson (UUP)	Carla Lockhart (DUP)	Sydney Anderson (DUP)
2017	John O'Dowd (Sinn Féin)	Dolores Kelly (SDLP)	Doug Beattie (UUP / Independent Unionist)	Jonathan Buckley (DUP)	Carla Lockhart (DUP)	5 seats 2017–present
January 2020 co-option	John O'Dowd (Sinn Féin)	Dolores Kelly (SDLP)	Doug Beattie (UUP / Independent Unionist)	Jonathan Buckley (DUP)	Diane Dodds (DUP)	5 seats 2017–present
2022	John O'Dowd (Sinn Féin)	Eóin Tennyson (Alliance)	Doug Beattie (UUP / Independent Unionist)	Jonathan Buckley (DUP)	Diane Dodds (DUP)	5 seats 2017–present
May 2026 defection	John O'Dowd (Sinn Féin)	Eóin Tennyson (Alliance)	Doug Beattie (UUP / Independent Unionist)	Jonathan Buckley (DUP)	Diane Dodds (DUP)	5 seats 2017–present

Note: The columns in this table are used only for presentational purposes, and no significance should be attached to the order of columns. For details of the order in which seats were won at each election, see the detailed results of that election.

== Elections ==
=== Northern Ireland Assembly ===
==== 2027 ====
2027 Assembly election: Upper Bann – 5 seats
Party	Candidate	FPv%	Count
Party	Candidate	FPv%	1
Ind. Unionist	Doug Beattie		
Sinn Féin	Catherine Nelson		
Sinn Féin	John O'Dowd		
UUP	Kyle Savage		

==== 2022 ====
2022 Assembly election: Upper Bann – 5 seats
Party	Candidate	FPv%	Count							
Party	Candidate	FPv%	1	2	3	4	5	6	7	8
Sinn Féin	**John O'Dowd**	16.47%	9,242	9,318	9,332	**10,146**				
DUP	**Jonathan Buckley**	15.81%	8,869	8,959	9,190	9,232	**11,500**			
DUP	**Diane Dodds**	11.67%	6,548	6,593	6,924	6,973	8,274	**10,182**		
UUP	**Doug Beattie**	9.27%	5,199	5,236	7,711	7,893	8,572	8,764	**9,572**	
Alliance	**Eóin Tennyson**	11.48%	6,440	6,762	6,869	8,591	8,676	8,685	8,698	**8,965**
Sinn Féin	Liam Mackle	12.94%	7,260	7,351	7,354	8,112	8,123	8,124	8,125	8,589
TUV	Darrin Foster	7.80%	4,373	4,445	4,607	4,626				
SDLP	Dolores Kelly	6.50%	3,645	3,843	3,875					
UUP	Glenn Barr	6.00%	3,367	3,400						
Aontú	Aidan Gribbin	1.02%	571							
Green (NI)	Lauren Kendall	0.82%	459							
Heritage	Glenn Beattie	0.23%	128							
Electorate: 91,149 Valid: 56,101 (61.55%) Spoilt: 853 Quota: 9,351 Turnout: 56,954 (62.48%)

==== 2017 ====
2017 Assembly election: Upper Bann – 5 seats
Party	Candidate	FPv%	Count					
Party	Candidate	FPv%	1	2	3	4	5	6
DUP	**Carla Lockhart**	17.73%	**9,140**					
DUP	**Jonathan Buckley**	15.02%	7,745	8,238	8,314	**8,764.84**		
UUP	**Doug Beattie**	10.61%	5,467	5,755	6,174	6,202.86	**10,728.86**	
Sinn Féin	**John O'Dowd**	15.95%	8,220	8,298	8,560	8,560	**8,593.6**	
SDLP	**Dolores Kelly**	9.95%	5,127	5,248	6,509	6,511.76	7,189.92	**9,053.92**
Sinn Féin	Nuala Toman	11.85%	6,108	6,169	6,294	6,294.3	6,316.6	6,341.6
UUP	Jo-Anne Dobson	9.96%	5,132	5,404	5,910	5,969.58		
Alliance	Tara Doyle	5.28%	2,720	3,097				
TUV	Roy Ferguson	2.01%	1,035					
Green (NI)	Simon Lee	1.08%	555					
Workers' Party	Colin Craig	0.42%	218					
NI Conservatives	Ian Nichols	0.16%	81					
Electorate: 83,431 Valid: 51,548 (61.79%) Spoilt: 626 Quota: 8,592 Turnout: 52,174 (62.54%)

==== 2016 ====
2016 Assembly election: Upper Bann – 6 seats
Party	Candidate	FPv%	Count										
Party	Candidate	FPv%	1	2	3	4	5	6	7	8	9	10	11
DUP	**Carla Lockhart**	17.50%	**7,993**										
DUP	**Sydney Anderson**	13.56%	6,195	**7,215.78**									
UUP	**Jo-Anne Dobson**	11.28%	5,155	5,319.52	5,598.76	5,637.21	5,660.83	5,863.96	5,901.84	6,136.86	**6,548.86**		
UUP	**Doug Beattie**	6.50%	2,969	2,990.42	3,085.58	3,108.38	3,121.77	3,295.09	3,333.66	3,658.56	4,118.79	4,454.57	**6,569.79**
Sinn Féin	**Catherine Seeley**	13.49%	6,164	6,164.9	6,165.29	6,178.47	6,222.47	6,225.47	6,344.47	6,358.78	6,359.78	6,439.96	**6,448.96**
Sinn Féin	**John O'Dowd**	11.40%	5,209	5,209.9	5,210.42	5,219.55	5,245.55	5,245.68	5,363.68	5,381.68	5,392.86	5,468.22	**5,477.35**
SDLP	Dolores Kelly	9.49%	4,335	4,339.86	4,342.72	4,390.85	4,461.85	4,472.16	4,559.47	4,580.12	4,597.1	5,237.88	5,309.79
UUP	Kyle Savage	3.85%	1,760	1,877	2,023.25	2,039.75	2,048.75	2,123.26	2,144.06	2,232.18	2,634.6	2,760.86	
Alliance	Harry Hamilton	3.12%	1,424	1,433.18	1,439.94	1,524.38	1,712.1	1,736.9	1,876.03	1,943.07	1,973.76		
TUV	Roy Ferguson	2.58%	1,177	1,207.6	1,275.33	1,281.24	1,282.24	1,376.76	1,387.89	1,707.82			
UKIP	David Jones	2.35%	1,072	1,089.64	1,121.23	1,130.23	1,142.23	1,262.68	1,333.4				
CISTA	Martin Kelly	1.47%	672	675.42	678.02	702.2	807.46	828.64					
PUP	Sophie Long	1.54%	704	730.46	756.07	760.25	769.43						
Green (NI)	Simon Lee	1.08%	495	496.8	498.23	555.36							
NI Labour	Emma Hutchinson	0.55%	250	250.9	251.94								
NI Conservatives	Ian Nickels	0.17%	79	80.44	83.04								
Independent	Steven McCarroll	0.07%	33	34.44	37.17								
Electorate: 85,204 Valid: 45,686 (53.62%) Spoilt: 697 Quota: 6,527 Turnout: 46,383 (54.44%)

==== 2011 ====
2011 Assembly election: Upper Bann – 6 seats
Party	Candidate	FPv%	Count						
Party	Candidate	FPv%	1	2	3	4	5	6	7
Sinn Féin	**John O'Dowd**	15.70%	**6,649**						
DUP	**Sydney Anderson**	13.82%	5,854	5,855.08	5,878.08	6,035.08	**6,163.08**		
DUP	**Stephen Moutray**	13.33%	5,645	5,645.63	5,686.63	5,935.9	**6,085.9**		
UUP	**Sam Gardiner**	8.68%	3,676	3,676.27	3,702.27	3,917.27	4,231.27	4,245.27	**6,012.36**
UUP	**Jo-Anne Dobson**	7.90%	3,348	3,348.72	3,373.72	3,554.81	4,007.99	4,042.99	**5,826.99**
SDLP	**Dolores Kelly**	11.44%	4,846	4,942.3	4,949.3	5,105.09	5,733.71	5,744.71	**5,787.07**
Sinn Féin	Johnny McGibbon	11.52%	4,879	5,347.27	5,347.36	5,365.34	5,427.23	5,429.23	5,437.5
UUP	Colin McCusker	8.03%	3,402	3,402.99	3,420.99	3,625.17	3,865.26	3,885.26	
Alliance	Harry Hamilton	4.67%	1,979	1,982.69	2,013.69	2,544.77			
TUV	David Vance	2.42%	1,026	1,026.18	1,092.18				
Alliance	Sheila McQuaid	1.86%	786	792.93	801.93				
UKIP	Barbara Trotter	0.64%	272	272.18					
Electorate: 77,905 Valid: 42,362 (54.38%) Spoilt: 751 Quota: 6,052 Turnout: 43,113 (55.34%)

==== 2007 ====
2007 Assembly election: Upper Bann – 6 seats
Party	Candidate	FPv%	Count											
Party	Candidate	FPv%	1	2	3	4	5	6	7	8	9	10	11	12
Sinn Féin	**John O'Dowd**	18.03%	**7,733**											
DUP	**David Simpson**	15.92%	**6,828**											
SDLP	**Dolores Kelly**	10.93%	4,689	4,939.2	4,940.3	5,007.1	5,559.4	5,789.2	5,804.2	**6,191.2**				
UUP	**Sam Gardiner**	11.97%	5,135	5,137.2	5,161.4	5,220.9	5,230	5,342.2	5,751.2	6,030	**7,265**			
DUP	**Stephen Moutray**	8.54%	3,663	3,663	4,137	4,170.6	4,170.7	4,184.2	4,556	4,620.7	4,692	4,732.32	**7,550.32**	
UUP	**George Savage**	5.05%	2,167	2,168	2,193.9	2,218	2,224	2,302.3	2,383.5	2,499.9	3,142.7	4,207.34	4,584.4	**5,997.52**
Sinn Féin	Dessie Ward	7.27%	3,118	4,313	4,313.2	4,451.6	4,526.6	4,556	4,559	4,708.7	4,716.7	4,717.66	4,723.56	4,731.84
DUP	John McCrum	6.94%	2,975	2,975.4	3,086.2	3,104.5	3,113.2	3,127.4	3,300.6	3,375.3	3,437.5	3,469.18		
UUP	Arnold Hatch	4.23%	1,815	1,815.6	1,837.2	1,858.5	1,863.7	1,916.8	2,014.8	2,142.7				
Green (NI)	Helen Corry	2.70%	1,156	1,176.4	1,179.1	1,289.3	1,321.9	1,682.3	1,757.7					
Ind. Unionist	Davy Calvert	3.11%	1,332	1,332	1,347.2	1,394.7	1,395.9	1,408.9						
Alliance	Sheila McQuaid	1.86%	798	802	804.1	841.3	946.9							
SDLP	Patrick McAleenan	1.77%	761	787	787.7	805								
Republican Sinn Féin	Barry Toman	0.90%	386	418.6	418.9									
NI Conservatives	David Fry	0.58%	248	248	249									
Ind. Unionist	Suzanne Peeples	0.18%	78	80.4	81.8									
Electorate: 70,716 Valid: 42,882 (60.64%) Spoilt: 353 Quota: 6,127 Turnout: 43,235 (61.14%)

==== 2003 ====
2003 Assembly election: Upper Bann – 6 seats
Party	Candidate	FPv%	Count										
Party	Candidate	FPv%	1	2	3	4	5	6	7	8	9	10	11
UUP	**David Trimble**	21.06%	**9,158**										
DUP	**David Simpson**	13.64%	5,933	6,032.52	6,034.16	6,103.32	**6,303.32**						
DUP	**Stephen Moutray**	10.80%	4,697	4,727.08	4,734.08	4,752.72	4,942.6	**6,458.6**					
UUP	**Sam Gardiner**	5.43%	2,359	3,419.48	3,435.72	3,480.44	3,730.68	3,888.92	3,990.71	4,032.53	**6,872.59**		
SDLP	**Dolores Kelly**	8.42%	3,661	3,711.56	3,786.08	3,787.08	3,973.4	3,976.36	3,978.97	3,981.43	4,059.18	4,330.54	**6,978.54**
Sinn Féin	**John O'Dowd**	12.70%	5,524	5,530.4	5,557.4	5,559.4	5,578.4	5,580.72	5,581.59	5,581.59	5,584.73	5,586.33	**5,912.6**
Sinn Féin	Dara O'Hagan	9.13%	3,970	3,983.44	4,004.44	4,004.44	4,026.08	4,027.08	4,027.08	4,027.08	4,029.04	4,030.96	4,301.12
SDLP	Kieran Corr	7.26%	3,157	3,195.72	3,251.64	3,260.64	3,411.96	3,415.28	3,417.89	3,419.53	3,462.19	3,668.91	
UUP	George Savage	2.92%	1,269	2,692.36	2,697.28	2,726.48	2,991.6	3,241.84	3,374.08	3,419.18			
DUP	Denis Watson	4.07%	1,770	1,832.08	1,834.08	1,852.72	2,113.16						
Independent	David Jones	1.35%	585	611.56	612.56	1,016.12							
Alliance	Francis McQuaid	1.31%	571	633.08	670.32	670.64							
Independent	Sydney Anderson	1.34%	581	607.24	607.88								
Workers' Party	Tom French	0.57%	247	260.12									
Electorate: 68,814 Valid: 43,482 (63.19%) Spoilt: 663 Quota: 6,212 Turnout: 44,145 (64.15%)

==== 1998 ====
1998 Assembly election: Upper Bann – 6 seats
Party	Candidate	FPv%	Count													
Party	Candidate	FPv%	1	2	3	4	5	6	7	8	9	10	11	12	13	14
UUP	**David Trimble**	24.48%	**12,338**													
SDLP	**Bríd Rodgers**	18.37%	**9,260**													
Sinn Féin	**Dara O'Hagan**	8.53%	4,301	4,306.46	4,578.16	4,584.26	4,584.26	4,709.44	4,713.88	4,713.88	4,772.86	**7,412.86**				
DUP	**Mervyn Carrick**	8.29%	4,177	4,310.14	4,310.8	4,315.22	4,388.32	4,398.84	4,443.06	4,726.52	4,739.8	4,742.02	4,743.67	4,872.05	**8,034.05**	
Ind. Unionist	**Denis Watson**	9.63%	4,855	5,365.3	5,365.3	5,378.86	5,431.8	5,447.74	5,546.78	6,267.98	6,351.38	6,353.02	6,353.32	6,636.18	7,149.5	**7,791.82**
UUP	**George Savage**	1.33%	669	2,380.92	2,383.12	2,403.46	2,410.72	2,431.78	2,972.08	3,051.46	3,447.98	3,456.56	3,457.31	6,022.53	6,353.53	**6,527.13**
SDLP	Mel Byrne	5.33%	2,687	2,731.52	4,166.58	4,185.2	4,185.2	4,447.06	4,457.06	4,460.06	5,218.84	5,484.38	5,688.83	5,786.27	5,872.81	5,877.77
DUP	Ruth Allen	7.21%	3,635	3,736.64	3,738.62	3,745.04	3,785.56	3,803.58	3,829.46	4,202.76	4,237.64	4,240.72	4,242.22	4,375.61		
UUP	Sam Gardiner	2.18%	1,097	2,449.4	2,451.16	2,470.94	2,481.04	2,515.46	2,985.26	3,032.6	3,414.38	3,419.66	3,420.86			
Sinn Féin	Francie Murray	5.78%	2,915	2,919.2	3,016.88	3,021.52	3,022.52	3,129.08	3,132.3	3,132.3	3,173.62					
Alliance	Francis McQuaid	3.09%	1,556	1,795.4	1,865.14	1,898.42	1,902.1	2,058.84	2,113.78	2,133.3						
UK Unionist	David Vance	2.79%	1,405	1,510	1,510	1,514.68	1,529.68	1,536.94	1,555.66							
UUP	Mark Neale	0.90%	455	1,250.48	1,252.24	1,261.02	1,272.44	1,294.46								
Labour Party NI	Alan Evans	0.87%	439	469.66	505.96	522.36	522.78									
Workers' Party	Tom French	0.54%	270	296.04	374.14	383.64	384.64									
Ulster Independence	Kenny McClinton	0.41%	207	220.02	220.46	224.3										
Independent	Brian Silcock	0.20%	101	142.58	146.1											
Natural Law	Jack Lyons	0.06%	32	34.94	38.68											
Electorate: 70,852 Valid: 50,399 (71.13%) Spoilt: 824 Quota: 7,200 Turnout: 51,223 (72.30%)

=== 1996 forum ===
Successful candidates are shown in bold.

Party	Candidate(s)	Votes	Percentage
UUP	**David Trimble**; **Sam Gardiner**; George Savage; John Dobson; Mark Neale	16,592	36.3
SDLP	**Bríd Rodgers**; Kieran McGeown; Patricia Mallon; Sean McKavanagh; Dolores Kelly	9,846	21.5
DUP	**Mervyn Carrick**; Frederick Baird; Ruth Allen	7,134	15.6
Sinn Féin	**Michelle O'Connor**; Rory Harbinson; Jean Fegan; Christopher Burke	5,620	12.3
Alliance	William Ramsey; Frank McQuaid; Sean Hagan	2,152	5.7
PUP	William Lawrie; Edward Kinner	1,404	3.1
UK Unionist	Morrison Woods; Dorothy Boyd	886	1.9
Labour coalition	Hugh Casey; Alan Evans; William White; Mary Sheen	512	1.0
Ulster Democratic	David McCrea; John Hammond	402	0.9
NI Women's Coalition	Kate Cochrane; Chris Moffat; Lesley Doyle	390	0.9
Workers' Party	Tom French; Peter Smith	311	0.7
Ulster Independence	Edward Kidd; Gary Nelson	180	0.4
Green (NI)	Gavin McDowell; Jameshid Fenderesky; Martha Brett	178	0.4
Democratic Partnership	Adrian McKinney; Pearl Snowden	71	0.2
Democratic Left	Ciaran McClean; Martin Cullen	36	0.1
Natural Law	John Darby; Rosalind Mulholland	14	0.0
Independent Chambers	Keith Chambers; William Larmour Jr	4	0.0
