= George Savage (politician) =

Northern Ireland politician (1941–2014)

- Savage in 2007

Member of Craigavon Borough Council
- In office 15 May 1985 – 22 May 2014
- Preceded by: District created
- Succeeded by: Council abolished
- Constituency: Lurgan
- In office 20 May 1981 – 15 May 1985
- Preceded by: Thomas Creith
- Succeeded by: District abolished
- Constituency: Craigavon Area D

Member of the Northern Ireland Assembly for Upper Bann
- In office 7 March 2007 – 5 May 2011
- Preceded by: David Trimble
- Succeeded by: Jo-Anne Dobson
- In office 25 June 1998 – 26 November 2003
- Preceded by: New Creation
- Succeeded by: Sam Gardiner

Personal details
- Born: 26 November 1941 Donacloney, Northern Ireland
- Died: 1 October 2014 (aged 72) Dromore, Northern Ireland
- Party: Ulster Unionist Party
- Spouse: Joy Savage
- Children: Kyle; George; Nigel
- Profession: Farmer

Military service
- Allegiance: United Kingdom
- Branch/service: British Army
- Years of service: 1971–1985
- Unit: Ulster Defence Regiment
- Battles/wars: The Troubles

George Savage (26 November 1941 – 1 October 2014) was a unionist politician in Northern Ireland. A native of County Armagh, he served in the Northern Ireland Assembly as an Ulster Unionist Party (UUP) member for Upper Bann from 1998 to 2003 and from 2007 to 2011. He was deselected by his constituency association ahead of the 2011 Assembly elections. In 1996 he was an unsuccessful candidate in the Northern Ireland Forum election in Upper Bann.

== Background ==
Born in Donacloney, he was the youngest of six children born to George, a dairy farmer and Jean (née Lamb) Savage.

== Personal life ==
He was a member of the Orange Order and Royal Black Institution. A lifelong and devout Methodist, he was also a director of Glenavon F.C.

Savage died on 1 October 2014, at the age of 72. He was survived by his wife Joy and their three sons, Kyle, George and Nigel.

Civic offices
Preceded by Arnold Hatch	Mayor of Craigavon; 1985–1987	Succeeded by Sydney Cairns
Preceded by David Simpson	Mayor of Craigavon; 2005–2006	Succeeded by Kenneth Twyble
Northern Ireland Assembly
New assembly	MLA for Upper Bann; 1998–2003	Succeeded by Sam Gardiner
Preceded by David Trimble	MLA for Upper Bann; 2007–2011	Succeeded by Jo-Anne Dobson
