= Hugh Casey (politician) =

British politician (1927–2013)

Member of the Northern Ireland Forum
- In office 30 May 1996 – 25 April 1998
- Preceded by: Forum created
- Succeeded by: Forum dissolved
- Constituency: Top-up list

Member of Craigavon Borough Council
- In office 17 May 1989 – 21 May 1997
- Preceded by: Peter Bunting
- Succeeded by: Mary McAlinden
- Constituency: Loughside

Personal details
- Born: 24 May 1927 County Armagh, Northern Ireland
- Died: 10 March 2013 (aged 85)
- Party: Labour Coalition (1996); SDLP (1989–1994)
- Other political affiliations: Labour Party of Northern Ireland (1998); Independent Labour (1994–1996; 1997)

Hugh Casey MBE (24 May 1927 – 10 March 2013) was a Northern Irish politician.

== Career ==
Casey worked as a community project manager in Lurgan before being elected to Craigavon Borough Council as a Social Democratic and Labour Party (SDLP) councillor in 1989. In 1994, he left the SDLP, after accepting an MBE, claiming that some in the party had ostracised him for accepting a British honour. He stood in Upper Bann as a Labour coalition candidate for the Northern Ireland Forum in 1996, heading a list which took only 512 votes.

Although no Labour coalition members were directly elected, as the tenth most successful party in the election, they were entitled to two seats in the Forum. These were allocated to Casey and Malachi Curran. In the same year, he became the first Catholic Mayor of Craigavon.

The Coalition soon disintegrated. Casey stood as an independent Labour candidate in the 1997 local elections, but lost his seat in Craigavon. He did not stand for the Northern Ireland Assembly in 1998, but did canvass for the Labour Party of Northern Ireland.

When the composition of the Northern Ireland Policing Board was first revealed in 1998, Casey was named as a member. From 2003, he sat on the County Armagh District Policing Partnership, and received death threats believed to be from dissident republicans. He later served as a member of Craigavon District Policing Partnership.

Civic offices
Preceded by Meta Crozier	Mayor of Craigavon; 1996	Succeeded by Sam Lutton
Northern Ireland Forum
New forum	Regional Member; 1996–1998	Forum dissolved
