= Dolores Kelly =

Former Irish nationalist politician (born 1959)

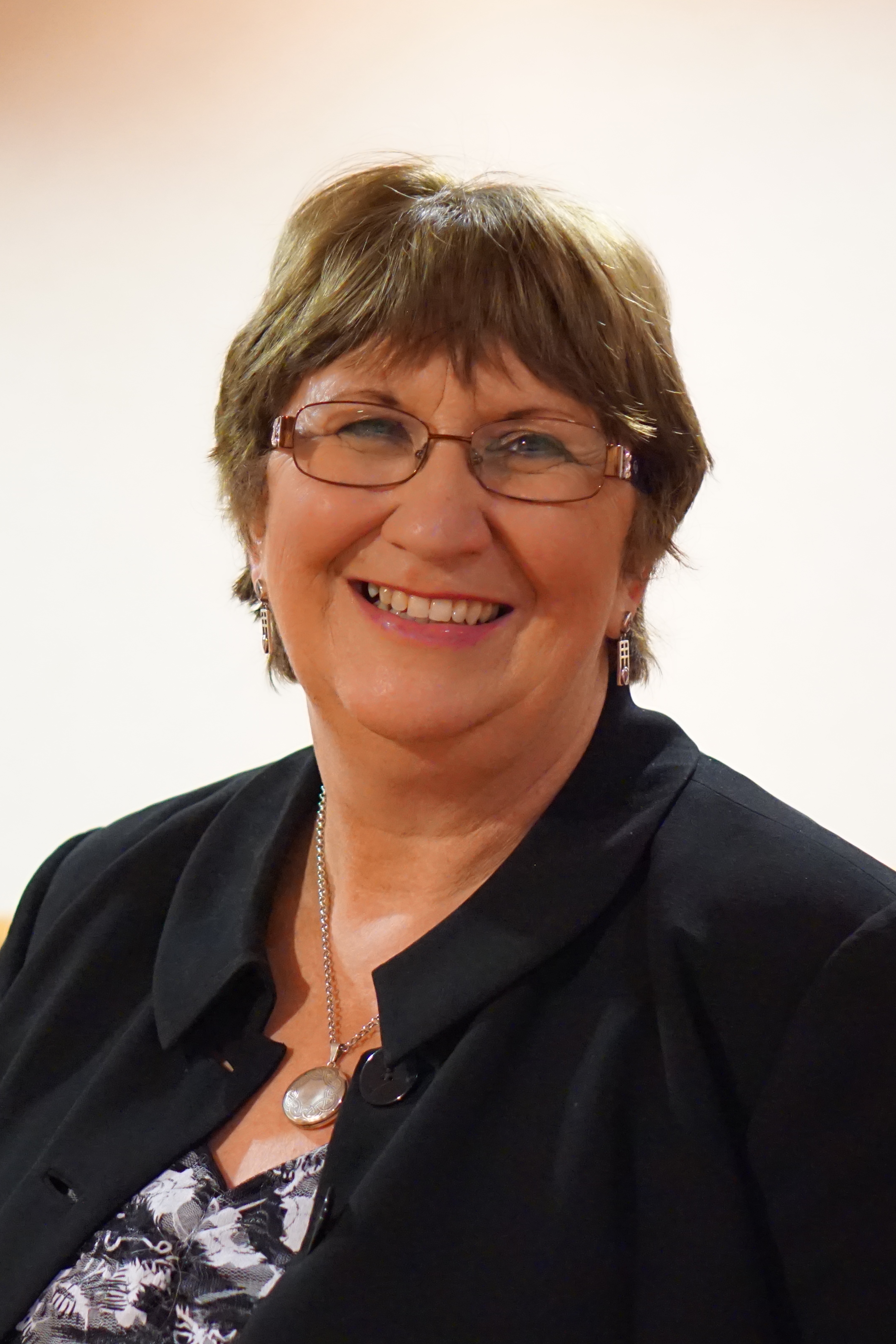

Deputy Leader of the Social Democratic and Labour Party
- In office 2011–2015
- Leader: Alasdair McDonnell
- Preceded by: Patsy McGlone
- Succeeded by: Fearghal McKinney

Member of the Northern Ireland Assembly for Upper Bann
- In office 2 March 2017 – 27 March 2022
- Preceded by: Catherine Seeley
- Succeeded by: Eóin Tennyson
- In office 26 November 2003 – 30 March 2016
- Preceded by: Bríd Rodgers
- Succeeded by: Catherine Seeley

Member of Craigavon Borough Council
- In office 19 May 1993 – 5 May 2011
- Preceded by: Catherine McStravick
- Succeeded by: Joe Nelson
- Constituency: Loughside

Personal details
- Born: 3 September 1959 (age 67) Aghalee, Northern Ireland
- Party: SDLP
- Spouse: Eamon Kelly
- Children: 4
- Education: University of Ulster
- Profession: Occupational therapist
- Website: SDLP profile

Mary Dolores Kelly (born 3 September 1959) is an Irish nationalist former politician who served as deputy leader of the Social Democratic and Labour Party (SDLP) from 2011 to 2015. She was a Member of the Northern Ireland Assembly (MLA) for Upper Bann from 2003 to 2016, and again from 2017 until 2022. She was succeeded by Eóin Tennyson in 2022.

== Background ==
Dolores Kelly attended St Michael's Grammar School, Lurgan and then the University of Ulster, Jordanstown, qualifying as an occupational therapist in 1981. She worked in the Craigavon Area Hospital and in social services in Banbridge. She married Eamon Kelly in 1982 and has four children.

== Political career ==
In May 1993, she was first elected to Craigavon Borough Council for the Loughside District. She sat on all committees and was chair of Technical Services and Environmental Services. In 1996, she was an unsuccessful candidate in the Northern Ireland Forum election in Upper Bann.

In May 1997, she was re-elected to Craigavon Borough. She was elected deputy mayor in 1998 and, from 1999 to 2000, was the first SDLP mayor of Craigavon. Kelly was also deputy leader of the SDLP from 2011 to 2015.

In 2004, Kelly was the target of death threats from dissident Republicans and her home was attacked. In 2009, Kelly was threatened by a masked gunman while canvassing in the Kilwilkie estate in Lurgan.

In 2003, Kelly was elected to Northern Ireland Assembly for Upper Bann. She was a member of the Northern Ireland Policing Board. She lost her seat in the 2016 Assembly election but regained it and rejoined the Policing Board in 2017, at the expense of Sinn Féin.

She lost her seat in the 2022 Northern Ireland Assembly election.

== Political positions ==
Kelly has called for the establishment of an all-island registry for those convicted of animal cruelty.

Civic offices
| Preceded by Mervyn Carrick | Mayor of Craigavon; 1999–2000 | Succeeded by Fred Crowe |
Northern Ireland Assembly
| Preceded by Bríd Rodgers | MLA for Upper Bann; 2003–2016 | Succeeded by Catherine Seeley |
| Preceded by Catherine Seeley | MLA for Upper Bann; 2017–2022 | Succeeded by Eóin Tennyson |
