= Mervyn Carrick =

British politician

Member of the Northern Ireland Assembly for Upper Bann
- In office 25 June 1998 – 26 November 2003
- Preceded by: New Creation
- Succeeded by: David Simpson

Mayor of Craigavon
- In office 1998–1999
- Preceded by: Sam Lutton
- Succeeded by: Dolores Kelly

Member of Craigavon Borough Council
- In office 19 May 1993 – 7 June 2001
- Preceded by: Michael Briggs
- Succeeded by: Sydney Anderson
- Constituency: Portadown

Northern Ireland Forum Member for Upper Bann
- In office 30 May 1996 – 25 April 1998
- Preceded by: Forum established
- Succeeded by: Forum dissolved

Personal details
- Born: 13 February 1946 (age 80) Portadown, Northern Ireland
- Party: Democratic Unionist Party (before 2005)
- Other political affiliations: Independent (2005)
- Profession: Accountant

William Mervyn Carrick, known as Mervyn Carrick (born 13 February 1946) is a former Unionist politician from Northern Ireland representing the Democratic Unionist Party (DUP).

== Early life and career ==
Born in Portadown, Carrick studied at Portadown Technical College before becoming an accountant. He joined the Democratic Unionist Party (DUP) and in 1990 was co-opted to Craigavon Borough Council.

== Political career ==
Carrick was elected to the Northern Ireland Forum in 1996, representing Upper Bann, but unsuccessfully contested the Westminster seat of Upper Bann at the 1997 general election. He held his Stormont seat at the 1998 Northern Ireland Assembly election and also served as Mayor of Craigavon in 1998–99.

Following a dispute over reselection, he joined the other local DUP councillors in standing down for the 2001 election.

When he stood as an independent at the 2005 election he was unable to take a seat.

Civic offices
| Preceded by Sam Lutton | Mayor of Craigavon; 1998–1999 | Succeeded by Dolores Kelly |
Northern Ireland Forum
| New forum | Member for Upper Bann; 1996–1998 | Forum dissolved |
Northern Ireland Assembly
| New assembly | MLA for Upper Bann; 1998–2003 | Succeeded by Ian McCrea |
