= Labour coalition =

- Leader: Malachi Curran
- Founded: 1996
- Dissolved: 1998
- Ideology: Trade Unionism; Social Democracy

The Labour Coalition was an electoral coalition in Northern Ireland of socialist and labour groups, formed to stand in the 1996 Northern Ireland Forum elections. It was listed in the enabling legislation simply as "Labour".

The coalition gained only 6,425 votes (0.85% of the total), winning no seats, but as the tenth most successful grouping in the election, it was entitled to two "top-up" seats on the Forum. The seats were taken by the first two named on the Regional List of Candidates, Malachi Curran and Hugh Casey. Both were former Social Democratic and Labour Party (SDLP) councillors.

The coalition split shortly after the election. Mark Langhammer of the Newtownabbey Labour Party, originally the leader of the group, severed his connection with it, and Malachi Curran replaced him as nominating representative for Labour, notice being posted in the Belfast Gazette of 16 August 1996. Curran represented Labour in the talks that led to the Good Friday Agreement in 1998.
