= 1981 Craigavon Borough Council election =

Local government election in Northern Ireland

← 1977	20 May 1981	1985 →

All 25 seats to Craigavon Borough Council 13 seats needed for a majority
	First party	Second party	Third party
Party	UUP	DUP	SDLP
Seats won	9	7	5
Seat change	▼1	▲3	▼1
	Fourth party	Fifth party	Sixth party
Party	Republican Clubs	Alliance	UUUP
Seats won	2	1	1
Seat change	▲1	▼2	0

Elections to Craigavon Borough Council were held on 20 May 1981 on the same day as the other Northern Irish local government elections. The election used four district electoral areas to elect a total of 25 councillors.

== Election results ==
Craigavon Borough Council Election Result 1981
Party	Seats	Gains	Losses	Net gain/loss	Seats %	Votes %	Votes	+/−
UUP	9	0	1	▼1	36.0	30.8	10,045	▼0.6
DUP	7	3	0	▲3	28.0	27.1	8,836	▲9.8
SDLP	5	0	1	▼1	20.0	20.8	6,801	▼2.6
Republican Clubs	2	0	0	▲1	8.0	9.4	3,059	▲3.8
Alliance	1	0	2	▼2	4.0	4.1	1,354	▼7.2
UUUP	1	0	0	0	4.0	3.9	1,276	▼1.9
Independent Socialist	0	0	0	0	0.0	2.7	898	▲2.7
Ind. Nationalist	0	0	0	0	0.0	0.8	250	▲0.8
Ind. Unionist	0	0	0	0	0.0	0.4	141	▲0.4

Note: "Votes" are the first preference votes.

== Districts summary ==
Results of the Craigavon Borough Council election, 1981 by district
Ward	%	Cllrs	%	Cllrs	%	Cllrs	%	Cllrs	%	Cllrs	%	Cllrs	%	Cllrs	Total Cllrs
Ward	UUP		DUP		SDLP		RC		Alliance		UUUP		Others		Total Cllrs
Area A	14.8	1	12.4	0	49.9	3	19.8	1	0.0	0	0.0	0	3.1	0	5
Area B	36.5	3	30.7	2	16.5	1	6.7	0	9.5	1	0.0	0	0.0	0	7
Area C	26.5	2	22.0	2	19.0	1	14.2	1	6.3	0	0.0	0	12.0	0	6
Area D	40.6	3	38.6	3	6.9	0	0.0	0	0.0	0	13.8	1	0.0	0	7
Total	30.8	9	27.1	7	20.8	5	9.4	2	4.1	1	3.9	1	3.9	0	25

== Districts results ==
=== Area A ===
1977: 3 x SDLP, 1 x Republican Clubs, 1 x UUP
1981: 3 x SDLP, 1 x Republican Clubs, 1 x UUP
1977-1981 Change: No change

Craigavon Area A - 5 seats
Party	Candidate	FPv%	Count				
Party	Candidate	FPv%	1	2	3	4	5
Republican Clubs	Padraig Breen	19.44%	1,200				
SDLP	James McDonald*	16.18%	999	1,032.2			
SDLP	Patrick Crilly*	10.56%	652	715.4	762.4	1,166.4	
SDLP	Sean McCavanagh*	14.04%	867	915	973.8	1,117.8	
UUP	James Gillespie*	11.86%	732	734.4	894.2	897.2	925.2
DUP	Victor Pickering	12.41%	766	766.4	786.4	786.6	795.6
SDLP	Ignatius Fox	9.12%	563	580	603.8		
Independent Socialist	Joseph Cunningham	3.11%	192	214.4			
UUP	William Lyness	2.96%	183	184.2			
Electorate: 8,797 Valid: 6,174 (70.18%) Spoilt: 245 Quota: 1,030 Turnout: 6,419 (72.97%)

=== Area B ===
1977: 3 x UUP, 2 x Alliance, 1 x DUP, 1 x SDLP
1981: 3 x UUP, 2 x DUP, 1 x Alliance, 1 x SDLP
1977-1981 Change: DUP gain from Alliance

Craigavon Area B - 7 seats
Party	Candidate	FPv%	Count							
Party	Candidate	FPv%	1	2	3	4	5	6	7	8
UUP	Herbert Whitten*	21.99%	1,785							
SDLP	Daniel Murphy*	16.54%	1,343							
DUP	Gladys McCullough*	13.88%	1,127							
UUP	Alan Locke*	8.18%	664	1,138.72						
DUP	James Forsythe	9.88%	802	829.95	830.21	834.83	957.03	1,019.93		
UUP	Arnold Hatch	6.38%	518	695.59	695.59	800.31	821.13	830.73	996.41	1,009.67
Alliance	William Ramsay*	5.11%	415	448.11	479.05	483.56	492.39	495.19	521.11	876.6
Republican Clubs	Dermot Hamill	6.66%	541	541	701.68	702.01	703.27	703.27	705.8	798.17
Alliance	Sean Hagan*	4.43%	360	365.16	493.6	494.48	496.74	497.14	504.63	
DUP	Frederick Richardson	4.14%	336	360.51	360.51	361.83	437.81	471.11		
DUP	John Oliver	2.80%	227	244.2	244.72	246.59				
Electorate: 12,023 Valid: 8,118 (67.52%) Spoilt: 326 Quota: 1,015 Turnout: 8,444 (70.23%)

=== Area C ===
1977: 2 x UUP, 2 x SDLP, 1 x Alliance, 1 x DUP
1981: 2 x UUP, 2 x DUP, 1 x SDLP, 1 x Republican Clubs
1977-1981 Change: DUP and Republican Clubs gain from SDLP and Alliance

Craigavon Area C - 6 seats
Party	Candidate	FPv%	Count												
Party	Candidate	FPv%	1	2	3	4	5	6	7	8	9	10	11	12	13
Republican Clubs	Tom French	14.19%	1,298	1,301	1,363										
SDLP	Hugh News*	11.77%	1,077	1,077	1,133	1,153.93	1,169.84	1,285.39	1,384.39						
UUP	Mary Simpson*	10.79%	987	1,015	1,015	1,015	1,015	1,015	1,132	1,134	1,194	1,200	1,552		
UUP	Cyril McLoughlin	8.47%	775	793	796	796	797	799	886	888	922	929	1,294	1,509.67	
DUP	William Smith	7.10%	650	662	662	662.91	663.91	663.91	671.91	672.91	1,053.91	1,054.91	1,074.91	1,089.92	1,150.75
DUP	Robert Dodds	8.20%	750	777	777	777.91	777.91	777.91	782.91	783.91	925.91	926.91	942.91	953.97	993.47
SDLP	Catherine McCann	4.27%	391	391	435	448.65	468.56	636.29	708.2	763.2	763.2	973.75	973.75	975.33	977.7
UUP	Jack Mathers	7.20%	659	670	670	670	670	670	759	760	774	782			
Independent Socialist	Alan Evans	4.35%	398	402	415	417.73	668.46	684.46	751.46	757.46	757.46				
DUP	Ronald Williamson*	6.74%	617	631	631	631	631	631	638	638					
Alliance	Brian Gee	6.33%	579	596	609	611.73	616.73	628.73							
SDLP	Terence McGinnity	2.95%	270	270	313	321.19	327.19								
Independent Socialist	George Forker	3.37%	308	309	313	317.55									
Ind. Nationalist	Robert McEvoy*	2.73%	250	252											
Ind. Unionist	Frederick Crowe	1.54%	141												
Electorate: 14,371 Valid: 9,150 (63.67%) Spoilt: 318 Quota: 1,308 Turnout: 9,468 (65.88%)

=== Area D ===
1977: 4 x UUP, 2 x DUP, 1 x UUUP
1981: 3 x UUP, 3 x DUP, 1 x UUUP
1977-1981 Change: DUP gain from UUP

Craigavon Area D - 7 seats
Party	Candidate	FPv%	Count					
Party	Candidate	FPv%	1	2	3	4	5	6
DUP	Frederick Baird*	17.03%	1,570					
DUP	David Calvert*	12.14%	1,119	1,284.36				
UUP	Sydney Cairns*	12.49%	1,151	1,179.08				
UUP	Samuel Gardiner	12.27%	1,131	1,142.96	1,146.16	1,397.16		
UUP	George Savage	11.15%	1,028	1,032.68	1,034.48	1,153.48		
DUP	Ian Williams	9.46%	872	997.06	1,104.86	1,123.96	1,156.96	
UUUP	Philip Black*	8.57%	790	842.26	850.26	877.22	983.22	1,439.22
SDLP	Gary Kennedy	6.93%	639	639.26	639.26	639.26	640.26	648.26
UUUP	Thomas Megarrell	5.27%	486	497.96	500.36	519.74	546.74	
UUP	Samuel Lutton	4.69%	432	436.94	438.94			
Electorate: 13,017 Valid: 9,218 (70.82%) Spoilt: 237 Quota: 1,153 Turnout: 9,455 (72.64%)
