= 1977 Craigavon Borough Council election =

Local government election in Northern Ireland

← 1973	18 May 1977	1981 →

All 25 seats to Craigavon Borough Council 13 seats needed for a majority
	First party	Second party	Third party
Party	UUP	SDLP	DUP
Seats won	10	6	4
Seat change	0	▲4	▲1
	Fourth party	Fifth party	Sixth party
Party	Alliance	UUUP	Republican Clubs
Seats won	3	1	1
Seat change	▼1	▲1	▲1
	Seventh party	Eighth party	Ninth party
Party	Vanguard	Ind. Unionist	Ind. Nationalist
Seats won	0	0	0
Seat change	▼4	▼1	▼1

Elections to Craigavon Borough Council were held on 18 May 1977 on the same day as the other Northern Irish local government elections. The election used four district electoral areas to elect a total of 25 councillors.

== Election results ==
Craigavon Borough Council Election Result 1977
Party	Seats	Gains	Losses	Net gain/loss	Seats %	Votes %	Votes	+/−
UUP	10	1	1	0	40.0	31.4	8,827	▼5.5
SDLP	6	4	0	▲4	24.0	23.4	6,595	▲16.7
DUP	4	2	1	▲1	16.0	17.3	4,871	▲5.7
Alliance	3	0	1	▼1	12.0	11.3	3,173	▼4.7
UUUP	1	1	0	▲1	4.0	6.8	1,907	New
Republican Clubs	1	1	0	▲1	4.0	5.6	1,578	▼0.4
Vanguard	0	0	4	▼4	0.0	2.1	599	▼13.9
Unionist Party NI	0	0	0	0	0.0	1.5	426	New
Independent	0	0	0	0	0.0	0.6	167	▲0.6

Note: "Votes" are the first preference votes.

== Districts summary ==
Results of the Craigavon Borough Council election, 1977 by district
Ward	%	Cllrs	%	Cllrs	%	Cllrs	%	Cllrs	%	Cllrs	%	Cllrs	%	Cllrs	Total Cllrs
Ward	UUP		SDLP		DUP		Alliance		UUUP		RC		Others		Total Cllrs
Area A	14.5	1	45.9	3	12.8	0	10.7	0	0.0	0	16.0	1	0.0	0	5
Area B	38.2	3	17.3	1	19.1	1	17.9	2	3.8	0	0.0	0	3.7	0	7
Area C	21.5	2	28.5	2	9.7	1	10.8	1	7.8	0	9.5	0	12.2	0	6
Area D	46.0	4	8.9	0	26.0	2	5.9	0	13.2	1	0.0	0	0.0	0	7
Total	31.4	10	23.4	6	17.3	4	11.3	3	6.8	1	5.6	1	4.2	0	25

== Districts results ==
=== Area A ===
1973: 1 x SDLP, 1 x UUP, 1 x Alliance, 1 x DUP, 1 x Independent Nationalist
1977: 3 x SDLP, 1 x Republican Clubs, 1 x UUP
1973-1977 Change: SDLP and Republican Clubs gain from Alliance and DUP, Independent Nationalist joins SDLP

Craigavon Area A - 5 seats
Party	Candidate	FPv%	Count					
Party	Candidate	FPv%	1	2	3	4	5	6
SDLP	James McDonald*	18.68%	1,013					
SDLP	Sean McCavanagh	16.56%	898	964.4				
Republican Clubs	Malachy McGurran	16.00%	868	875.5	877.5	882.72	1,072.72	
SDLP	Patrick Crilly*	10.71%	581	595.6	596.7	646.83	916.83	
UUP	James Gillespie	8.19%	444	444.5	723.6	723.6	751.69	767.69
DUP	Frederick Baird*	12.83%	696	696.2	737.6	737.6	740.97	742.97
Alliance	Donnell Deeny*	10.75%	583	591.3	601.4	605.27		
UUP	Eric McKeown	6.29%	341	341.8				
Electorate: 8,541 Valid: 5,424 (63.51%) Spoilt: 321 Quota: 905 Turnout: 5,745 (67.26%)

=== Area B ===
1973: 2 x UUP, 2 x Alliance, 2 x Vanguard, 1 x Independent Unionist
1977: 3 x UUP, 2 x Alliance, 1 x DUP, 1 x SDLP
1973-1977 Change: DUP and SDLP gain from Vanguard (two seats), Independent Unionist joins UUP

Craigavon Area B - 7 seats
Party	Candidate	FPv%	Count											
Party	Candidate	FPv%	1	2	3	4	5	6	7	8	9	10	11	12
UUP	Herbert Whitten*	25.60%	1,863											
UUP	John Wright*	6.28%	457	919.57										
UUP	Alan Locke*	6.32%	460	779.66	808.21	812.76	834.33	931.33						
DUP	Gladys McCullough	7.50%	546	562.83	565.83	593.34	682.91	712.03	910.03					
SDLP	Daniel Murphy	11.05%	804	804	804	804	804	804	804	1,203				
Alliance	Sean Hagan*	11.31%	823	827.08	834.08	835.08	841.08	850.08	854.08	900.08	1,130.63			
Alliance	William Ramsay*	6.64%	483	511.56	511.56	516.56	525.56	559.17	570.25	577.25	637.28	788.66	797.66	800.42
DUP	James Forsythe	6.84%	498	508.71	510.22	519.73	561.81	605.95	782.21	783.21	784.08	784.08	795.96	798.19
SDLP	Mary Mackle	6.28%	457	457	457	458	458	458	459					
DUP	William Stothers	4.75%	346	364.36	364.36	376.87	400.91	424.48						
Vanguard	Samuel McCammick*	2.90%	211	245.68	274.7	279.21	292.74							
UUUP	John Lyttle	1.98%	144	159.3	163.81	231.34								
UUUP	James McBratney	1.80%	131	137.12	139.12									
Vanguard	William Lappin	0.74%	54	58.59										
Electorate: 12,358 Valid: 7,277 (58.88%) Spoilt: 390 Quota: 910 Turnout: 7,667 (62.04%)

=== Area C ===
1973: 3 x UUP, 1 x SDLP, 1 x Alliance, 1 x Vanguard
1977: 2 x UUP, 2 x SDLP, 1 x Alliance, 1 x DUP
1973-1977 Change: SDLP and DUP gain from UUP and Vanguard

Craigavon Area C - 6 seats
Party	Candidate	FPv%	Count											
Party	Candidate	FPv%	1	2	3	4	5	6	7	8	9	10	11	12
SDLP	Hugh News*	15.90%	1,194											
SDLP	Robert McEvoy	8.99%	675	735.5	741.2	790	790	792	807.5	817.1	1,082.9			
UUP	Frank Dale*	11.37%	854	854	854	854	870	966	966	974	974	1,088		
DUP	Ronald Williamson	9.67%	726	726	726	726	741	747	747	748	748	798	832	1,175
UUP	Mary Simpson	7.07%	531	531	538	538	539.1	634.1	634.1	634.1	634.1	719.1	946.1	1,069.1
Alliance	Brian English	6.01%	451	453.6	519.7	530.8	534.8	543.8	543.8	773.1	787.3	802.3	965.5	974.5
Republican Clubs	Patrick O'Malley	6.02%	452	464.3	465.5	490.1	490.1	490.1	738	746.4	796	796	796	798
UUUP	William Cooper	5.10%	383	383	385	387	512	518	518	521	521	563	592	
Unionist Party NI	Florence Woodman	5.67%	426	426.3	438.3	438.3	445.3	454.3	454.3	456.4	456.4	491.4		
Vanguard	Frederick Crowe*	4.45%	334	334	336	336	355	358	358	360	360			
SDLP	Virginia King	3.58%	269	300.2	301.3	336.9	336.9	336.9	341.6	357				
Alliance	William Blanton	3.26%	245	246.5	263.6	281.2	287.2	290.2	293.2					
Republican Clubs	Roger Monteith	3.44%	258	260.2	260.4	280.8	281.8	282.8						
UUP	James Glenn	3.01%	226	226	227	228	235							
UUUP	Robert Anderson	2.69%	202	202.1	203.1	203.1								
Independent	Hugh Casey	2.22%	167	172.2	172.3									
Alliance	Michael Stevenson	1.56%	117	118.5										
Electorate: 13,624 Valid: 7,510 (55.12%) Spoilt: 325 Quota: 1,073 Turnout: 7,835 (57.51%)

=== Area D ===
1973: 4 x UUP, 2 x DUP, 1 x Vanguard
1977: 4 x UUP, 2 x DUP, 1 x UUUP
1973-1977 Change: Vanguard joins UUUP

Craigavon Area D - 7 seats
Party	Candidate	FPv%	Count						
Party	Candidate	FPv%	1	2	3	4	5	6	7
DUP	David Calvert*	13.63%	1,081						
UUUP	Philip Black*	10.68%	847	969	1,011				
UUP	James Baird*	11.54%	915	928	933	937	1,016		
DUP	Thomas Willey*	8.55%	678	703	922	989.76	994.76		
UUP	Sydney Cairns*	10.55%	837	849	874	880.64	927.64	1,197.64	
UUP	Eric Crozier	8.94%	709	715	720	723.12	791.28	917.6	998.94
UUP	Thomas Creith*	8.62%	684	687	689	690.76	765.76	876	997.52
SDLP	Brid Rodgers	8.88%	704	704	704	704.08	802.16	808.16	810.12
UUP	Thomas Megarrell*	6.38%	506	511	520	521.52	565.52		
Alliance	Charles Phillips	5.94%	471	472	472	472.32			
DUP	Harold Glass	3.78%	300	313					
UUUP	John Dummigan	2.52%	200						
Electorate: 13,004 Valid: 7,932 (61.00%) Spoilt: 366 Quota: 992 Turnout: 8,298 (63.81%)
