= Central (District Electoral Area) =

District electoral areas in Craigavon, Northern Ireland

Central DEA (1993-2014) within Craigavon

Central was one of the four district electoral areas in Craigavon, Northern Ireland which existed from 1985 to 2014. The district elected seven members to Craigavon Borough Council, and formed part of the Upper Bann constituencies for the Northern Ireland Assembly and UK Parliament.

It was created for the 1985 local elections, replacing Craigavon Area C which had existed since 1973, and contained the wards of Bleary, Drumgask, Drumgor, Edenderry, Kernan, Killycomain and Tullygally. It was abolished for the 2014 local elections and replaced with the Craigavon DEA with areas also moving into the Portadown DEA.

== Demography ==
On Census Day (27 March 2011) the usually resident population of Craigavon District Electoral Area was 25,287 accounting for 1.40% of the NI total.

- 96.92% were from the white (including Irish Traveller) ethnic group;
- 49.12% belong to or were brought up in the Catholic Christian church and 44.12% belong to or were brought up in a 'Protestant and Other Christian (including Christian related)' churches; and
- 46.47% indicated that they had a British national identity, 25.04% had an Irish national identity and 29.72% had a Northern Irish national identity.

Respondents could indicate more than one national identity

On Census Day 27 March 2011, in Craigavon District Electoral Area, considering the population aged 3 years old and over:

- 10.17% had some knowledge of Irish;
- 4.83% had some knowledge of Ulster-Scots; and
- 6.95% did not have English as their first language.

Through the late 1970s and early 1980s, Craigavon hosted many families of Refugees of the Vietnam War.

== Councillors ==
Election	Councillor (Party)	Councillor (Party)	Councillor (Party)	Councillor (Party)	Councillor (Party)	Councillor (Party)	Councillor (Party)
2011	Mark O'Dowd (Sinn Féin)	Tommy O'Connor (Sinn Féin)	Michael Dixon (Alliance)	Kenneth Twyble (UUP)	Ronald Harkness (UUP)	Robert Smith (DUP)	William Smith (DUP)
2005	John O'Dowd (Sinn Féin)	Kieran Corr (SDLP)	Philip Weir (DUP)	Kenneth Twyble (UUP)	Ronald Harkness (UUP)	Robert Smith (DUP)	William Smith (DUP)
2001	Francis Murray (Sinn Féin)	Kieran Corr (SDLP)	Patricia Mallon (SDLP)	Kenneth Twyble (UUP)	Frederick Crowe (UUP)	Robert Smith (DUP)	William Smith (DUP)
1997	Francis Murray (Sinn Féin)	Sean Hagan (Alliance)	Patricia Mallon (SDLP)	Kenneth Twyble (UUP)	Frederick Crowe (UUP)	Samuel McCammick (UUP)	William Allen (DUP)
1993	Brendan Curran (Sinn Féin)	Sean Hagan (Alliance)	Patricia Mallon (SDLP)	Kenneth Twyble (UUP)	Frederick Crowe (UUP)	Samuel McCammick (UUP)	William Allen (DUP)
1989	Elizabeth McClurg (UUP)	Sean Hagan (Alliance)	James Daly (SDLP)	Pauline Lindsay (UUP)	Frederick Crowe (UUP)	Samuel McCammick (UUP)	David Calvin (DUP)
1985	William Smith (DUP)	Tom French (Workers' Party)	Brid Rodgers (SDLP)	Cyril McLoughlin (UUP)	Mary Simpson (UUP)	Samuel McCammick (UUP)	Robert Dodds (DUP)

== 2011 Election ==
2005: 3 x DUP, 2 x UUP, 1 x Sinn Féin, 1 x SDLP

2011: 2 x DUP, 2 x UUP, 2 x Sinn Féin, 1 x Alliance

2005-2011 Change: Sinn Féin and Alliance gain from SDLP and DUP

Craigavon Central - 7 seats
Party	Candidate	FPv%	Count										
Party	Candidate	FPv%	1	2	3	4	5	6	7	8	9	10	11
Sinn Féin	Mark O'Dowd	16.28%	1,434										
DUP	Robert Smith*	15.95%	1,405										
UUP	Kenneth Twyble*	12.54%	1,104										
Sinn Féin	Tommy O'Connor	8.45%	744	1,025.52	1,025.73	1,038.61	1,038.61	1,123.61					
DUP	William Smith*	7.81%	688	688.24	952.21	953.21	1,053.04	1,057.05	1,057.67	1,455.67			
UUP	Ronald Harkness*	6.97%	614	614.48	619.52	620.52	675.52	679.52	679.52	710.34	862.34	1,266.34	
Alliance	Michael Dixon	6.66%	586	587.68	588.31	591.55	596.79	676.67	687.83	698.7	706.7	769.82	900.82
Independent	Kieran Corr*	7.86%	692	717.2	717.62	731.58	737.58	837.62	847.54	851.96	856.96	872.41	879.41
UUP	Andrew Crockett	5.21%	459	459.48	461.58	462.58	496	498	498.62	511.56	596.56		
DUP	Louise Templeton	5.04%	444	444	462.69	462.93	476.14	477.14	477.14				
SDLP	Mary Elliott	3.16%	278	287.12	287.33	355.49	355.73						
TUV	Roy Ferguson	2.85%	251	251.24	253.13	254.37							
SDLP	Anna Ochal-Molenda	1.23%	108	115.44	115.44								
Electorate: 16,864 Valid: 8,807 (52.22%) Spoilt: 277 Quota: 1,101 Turnout: 9,084 (53.87%)

== 2005 Election ==
2001: 2 x DUP, 2 x UUP, 2 x SDLP, 1 x Sinn Féin

2005: 3 x DUP, 2 x UUP, 1 x Sinn Féin, 1 x SDLP

2001–2005 Change: DUP gain from SDLP

Craigavon Central - 7 seats
Party	Candidate	FPv%	Count								
Party	Candidate	FPv%	1	2	3	4	5	6	7	8	9
DUP	Robert Smith*	16.88%	1,587								
UUP	Kenneth Twyble*	13.91%	1,308								
Sinn Féin	John O'Dowd*	13.07%	1,229								
DUP	William Smith*	9.87%	928	1,280.82							
UUP	Ronald Harkness	5.58%	525	527.08	580.68	710.82	713.48	714.94	1,147.57	1,411.57	
SDLP	Kieran Corr*	8.38%	788	788	788.9	792	792	1,147.1	1,157.2	1,318.2	
DUP	Philip Weir	6.61%	622	666.72	674.82	744.46	830.77	831.87	859.2	912.81	998.81
Sinn Féin	Francis Murray*	7.37%	693	693	693.1	694.1	694.1	740.1	743.1	772.6	778.6
Alliance	Alan Castle	6.36%	598	599.3	606.3	615.36	616.34	646.8	666.86		
UUP	Frederick Crowe*	4.48%	421	423.6	452.1	517.92	520.02	522.02			
SDLP	Patricia Mallon*	4.79%	450	450.52	451.12	451.22	451.29				
UUP	Robert Oliver	2.70%	254	259.72	289.72						
Electorate: 15,519 Valid: 9,403 (60.59%) Spoilt: 230 Quota: 1,176 Turnout: 9,633 (62.07%)

== 2001 Election ==
1997: 3 x UUP, 1 x SDLP, 1 x DUP, 1 x Sinn Féin, 1 x Alliance

2001: 2 x DUP, 2 x UUP, 2 x SDLP, 1 x Sinn Féin

1997-2001 Change: DUP and SDLP gain from UUP and Alliance

Craigavon Central - 7 seats
Party	Candidate	FPv%	Count										
Party	Candidate	FPv%	1	2	3	4	5	6	7	8	9	10	11
UUP	Kenneth Twyble*	15.93%	1,694										
Sinn Féin	Francis Murray*	11.27%	1,198	1,198	1,220	1,220	1,224	1,728					
SDLP	Patricia Mallon*	9.37%	996	997.89	1,057.89	1,062.31	1,162.36	1,211.78	1,390.78				
UUP	Frederick Crowe*	7.54%	802	887.26	904.26	1,030.97	1,132.48	1,133.48	1,133.48	1,133.97	1,438.97		
DUP	William Smith	9.97%	1,060	1,075.12	1,078.12	1,082.17	1,087.8	1,087.8	1,087.8	1,087.8	1,130.14	1,149.04	1,332.04
DUP	Robert Smith	7.62%	810	813.36	816.57	820.2	822.83	822.83	822.83	822.83	860	883.8	1,289.72
SDLP	Kieran Corr	7.01%	745	745.63	782.63	784.63	843.47	871.68	942.68	1,000.99	1,042.38	1,054.28	1,062.24
DUP	Denis Watson	6.70%	712	738.25	741.25	752.51	758.93	758.93	758.93	759.42	839.82	876.22	1,045.41
Independent	David Calvert	7.16%	761	766.46	770.46	774.51	783.93	783.93	784.93	784.93	819.48	836.98	
UUP	Samuel McCammick*	3.72%	396	527.25	532.46	665.88	753.18	753.18	753.18	754.16			
Sinn Féin	Peter Toland	5.66%	602	602.21	618.42	618.42	622.63						
Alliance	Sean Hagan*	3.56%	379	394.12	429.96	446.32							
UUP	Audrey Lindsay	2.35%	250	313.84	315.84								
Workers' Party	Tom French	1.24%	132	132.84									
Independent	Alan Evans	0.90%	96	97.05									
Electorate: 15,747 Valid: 10,633 (67.52%) Spoilt: 254 Quota: 1,330 Turnout: 10,887 (69.14%)

== 1997 Election ==
1993: 3 x UUP, 1 x SDLP, 1 x DUP, 1 x Sinn Féin, 1 x Alliance

1997: 3 x UUP, 1 x SDLP, 1 x DUP, 1 x Sinn Féin, 1 x Alliance

1993-1997 Change: No change

Craigavon Central - 7 seats
Party	Candidate	FPv%	Count							
Party	Candidate	FPv%	1	2	3	4	5	6	7	8
UUP	Kenneth Twyble*	20.15%	1,576							
DUP	William Allen*	13.79%	1,079							
Sinn Féin	Francis Murray	13.40%	1,048							
SDLP	Patricia Mallon*	12.89%	1,008							
UUP	Samuel McCammick*	9.42%	737	965	991					
Alliance	Sean Hagan*	6.92%	541	563.42	564.52	565.87	566.96	568.19	708.84	914.04
UUP	Frederick Crowe*	9.23%	722	831.82	883.32	883.32	883.32	883.32	890.24	910.03
UUP	Cyril McLoughlin	4.82%	377	591.7	610.8	610.8	614.8	614.89	625.49	636.44
Labour Coalition	Alan Evans	4.97%	389	395.08	395.68	417.82	425.73	426.63	541.63	
SDLP	Philip Mallon	2.33%	182	182	182	217.01	224.37	250.86		
NI Women's Coalition	Chris Moffat	1.07%	84	88.56	88.76	89.93	90.93	91.17		
Workers' Party	Peter Smyth*	0.70%	55	56.14	56.44	60.04	61.67	62.27		
Labour Coalition	William McAvoy	0.32%	25	25	25.1	28.07				
Electorate: 15,325 Valid: 7,823 (51.05%) Spoilt: 159 Quota: 978 Turnout: 7,982 (52.08%)

== 1993 Election ==
1989: 4 x UUP, 1 x SDLP, 1 x DUP, 1 x Alliance

1993: 3 x UUP, 1 x SDLP, 1 x DUP, 1 x Sinn Féin, 1 x Alliance

1989-1993 Change: Sinn Féin gain from UUP

Craigavon Central - 7 seats
Party	Candidate	FPv%	Count						
Party	Candidate	FPv%	1	2	3	4	5	6	7
UUP	Kenneth Twyble	16.12%	1,246						
DUP	William Allen	15.16%	1,172						
UUP	Frederick Crowe*	9.92%	767	808.36	907.36	910.36	982.36		
UUP	Samuel McCammick*	8.47%	655	736.18	773.98	779.42	872.78	1,195.78	
SDLP	Patricia Mallon	11.01%	851	851.22	851.4	933.4	934.4	936.02	937.02
Sinn Féin	Brendan Curran*	11.19%	865	865.22	865.58	884.58	884.58	884.8	884.8
Alliance	Sean Hagan*	7.79%	602	613.44	615.24	686.04	698.8	786.92	857.92
SDLP	Gabriel O'Dowd	8.49%	656	656.44	626.62	709.62	709.62	714.34	718.34
UUP	Elizabeth McClurg*	4.90%	379	471.84	500.28	505.12	630.08		
UUP	Pauline Lindsay*	3.26%	252	291.6	320.04	321.04			
Workers' Party	Tom French*	3.69%	285	286.98	287.52				
Electorate: 15,087 Valid: 7,730 (51.24%) Spoilt: 250 Quota: 967 Turnout: 7,980 (52.89%)

== 1989 Election ==
1985: 3 x UUP, 2 x DUP, 1 x SDLP, 1 x Workers' Party

1989: 4 x UUP, 2 x DUP, 1 x SDLP, 1 x Alliance

1985-1989 Change: UUP and Alliance gain from DUP and Workers' Party

Craigavon Central - 7 seats
Party	Candidate	FPv%	Count							
Party	Candidate	FPv%	1	2	3	4	5	6	7	8
UUP	Samuel McCammick*	21.69%	1,642							
SDLP	James Daly	13.25%	1,003							
UUP	Frederick Crowe	10.74%	813	1,079.29						
DUP	David Calvin	12.09%	915	936.84	945.24	1,068.24				
UUP	Pauline Lindsay	6.54%	495	637.8	700.17	750.9	792.9	798.32	997.32	
UUP	Elizabeth McClurg	6.04%	457	651.04	697.87	719.55	728.55	733.97	951.31	
Alliance	Sean Hagan	7.99%	605	614.24	615.29	627.29	632.29	793.29	799.34	840.22
Sinn Féin	Sheena Campbell	8.06%	610	610	610.21	612.21	614.21	744.21	744.21	759.05
DUP	Eric Patterson	5.36%	406	451.36	462.28	495.12	555.12	559.12		
Workers' Party	Peter Smyth	4.89%	370	370.84	371.05	373.05	373.05			
Ind. Unionist	Barrie Bradbury	3.37%	255	259.62	261.09					
Electorate: 13,988 Valid: 7,571 (54.12%) Spoilt: 205 Quota: 947 Turnout: 7,776 (55.59%)

== 1985 Election ==
1985: 3 x UUP, 2 x DUP, 1 x SDLP, 1 x Workers' Party

Craigavon Central - 7 seats
Party	Candidate	FPv%	Count				
Party	Candidate	FPv%	1	2	3	4	5
UUP	Mary Simpson*	17.54%	1,359				
DUP	William Smith*	14.84%	1,150				
UUP	Samuel McCammick	13.06%	1,012				
SDLP	Brid Rodgers*	11.40%	883				
UUP	Cyril McLoughlin*	8.27%	641	970.44			
Workers' Party	Tom French*	6.97%	540	541.16	542.44	658.37	931.37
DUP	Robert Dodds*	8.91%	690	706.24	791.52	810.96	813.96
DUP	Meredith Patterson	6.92%	536	563.55	645.63	693.14	694.14
Sinn Féin	Sheena Campbell	7.15%	554	554	554	556	
Alliance	Sean Hagan	3.85%	298	308.15	310.55		
Alliance	James Woods	1.10%	85	88.48	89.6		
Electorate: 13,002 Valid: 7,748 (59.59%) Spoilt: 151 Quota: 969 Turnout: 7,899 (60.75%)
