= 1973 Craigavon Borough Council election =

Local government election in Northern Ireland

30 May 1973	1977 →

All 25 seats to Craigavon Borough Council 13 seats needed for a majority
	First party	Second party	Third party
Party	UUP	Alliance	Vanguard
Seats won	10	4	4
	Fourth party	Fifth party	Sixth party
Party	DUP	SDLP	Ind. Nationalist
Seats won	3	2	1
	Seventh party
Party	Ind. Unionist
Seats won	1

Elections to Craigavon Borough Council were held on 30 May 1973 on the same day as the other Northern Irish local government elections. The election used four district electoral areas to elect a total of 25 councillors.

== Election results ==
Party	Seats	±	First Pref. votes	FPv%	±%
UUP	10		11,589	36.9%	
Alliance	4		5,014	16.0%	
Vanguard	4		5,014	16.0%	
DUP	3		3,647	11.6%	
SDLP	2		2,092	6.7%	
Ind. Nationalist	1		821	2.6%	
Ind. Unionist	1		621	2.0%	
Republican Clubs	0		1,879	6.0%	
NI Labour	0		363	1.2%	
Independent	0		384	1.2%	
Totals	25		32,662	100.0%	—

== Districts summary ==
Results of the Craigavon Borough Council election, 1973 by district
Ward	%	Cllrs	%	Cllrs	%	Cllrs	%	Cllrs	%	Cllrs	%	Cllrs	Total Cllrs
Ward	UUP		Alliance		Vanguard		DUP		SDLP		Others		Total Cllrs
Area A	22.2	1	14.7	1	0.0	0	13.8	1	17.7	1	20.9	1	5
Area B	35.5	2	21.7	2	19.8	2	8.1	0	0.0	0	14.9	1	7
Area C	33.2	3	16.2	1	18.9	1	5.5	0	14.3	1	11.9	0	6
Area D	50.4	4	11.0	0	20.0	1	18.6	2	0.0	0	0.0	0	7
Total	36.9	10	16.0	4	16.0	4	11.6	3	6.7	2	12.8	2	25

== Districts results ==
=== Area A ===
1973: 1 x SDLP, 1 x UUP, 1 x Alliance, 1 x DUP, 1 x Independent Nationalist

Craigavon Area A - 5 seats
Party	Candidate	FPv%	Count									
Party	Candidate	FPv%	1	2	3	4	5	6	7	8	9	10
SDLP	Patrick Crilly	8.91%	521	535	569	569	594	1,023				
UUP	W. N. Rodgers	11.63%	680	680	680	760	760	760	1,304			
DUP	Frederick Baird	7.05%	412	412	412	710	710	710	767	1,058.2		
Alliance	Donnell Deeny	9.99%	584	603	808	808	832	890	904	929.9	967.7	975.89
Ind. Nationalist	James McDonald	14.04%	821	844	861	861	888	913	915	923.4	936	969.28
Republican Clubs	T. Fleville	7.13%	417	478	495	495	864	891	891	891	891	897.24
UUP	W. Monroe	10.53%	616	616	616	622	622	622				
SDLP	T. Mackle	8.84%	517	528	537	537	548					
Republican Clubs	J. Mulholland	6.60%	386	452	464	464						
DUP	William Stothers	6.74%	394	394	394							
Alliance	B. Casey	4.74%	277	297								
Ind. Republican	K. Toman	3.81%	223									
Electorate: 9,065 Valid: 5,848 (64.51%) Spoilt: 155 Quota: 975 Turnout: 6,003 (66.22%)

=== Area B ===
1973: 2 x UUP, 2 x Alliance, 2 x Vanguard, 1 x Independent Unionist

Craigavon Area B - 7 seats
Party	Candidate	FPv%	Count											
Party	Candidate	FPv%	1	2	3	4	5	6	7	8	9	10	11	12
UUP	Herbert Whitten	25.44%	2,273											
Alliance	Sean Hagan	16.32%	1,458											
Vanguard	Samuel McCammick	7.65%	683	710.03	710.26	711.77	742.3	804.87	808.38	808.61	823.12	1,197.12		
Vanguard	C. Atkinson	10.14%	906	936.6	936.83	937.83	954.85	988.89	990.12	991.12	1,008.32	1,170.22		
Alliance	William Ramsay	4.32%	386	416.09	535.23	541.38	542.4	550.44	735.99	883.13	1,114.79	1,124.79		
UUP	Alan Locke	6.32%	565	972.49	972.49	973.49	979.02	994.1	1,001.58	1,001.58	1,071.92	1,110.53	1,116.53	1,120.6
Ind. Unionist	John Wright	6.96%	621	720.45	723.44	723.67	730.2	762.26	767.61	793.6	850.99	916.54	971.54	1,012.61
UUP	J. Toal	3.77%	337	826.6	826.6	826.6	831.15	843.17	845.17	845.17	891.29	923.37	937.37	944.77
DUP	James Forsythe	6.06%	541	551.71	551.71	553.28	650.75	688.26	688.26	688.26	698.77			
NI Labour	T. Newell	3.45%	308	335.03	355.73	393.62	397.62	401.64	427.33	488.61				
Republican Clubs	M. Smith	4.04%	361	361	404.47	405.39	405.39	405.39	415.06					
Alliance	O. Henry	1.05%	94	96.55	231.56	243.55	245.55	245.55						
Vanguard	J. Robinson	2.00%	179	195.83	195.83	195.83	205.34							
DUP	A. Gracey	1.86%	166	177.73	177.73	178.73								
NI Labour	J. Clarke	0.62%	55	56.53	63.43									
Electorate: 12,948 Valid: 8,933 (68.99%) Spoilt: 123 Quota: 1,117 Turnout: 9,056 (69.94%)

=== Area C ===
1973: 3 x UUP, 1 x SDLP, 1 x Alliance, 1 x Vanguard

Craigavon Area C - 6 seats
Party	Candidate	FPv%	Count											
Party	Candidate	FPv%	1	2	3	4	5	6	7	8	9	10	11	12
Vanguard	Frederick Crowe	18.85%	1,385											
SDLP	Hugh News	10.27%	771	771	788	789	841	841	874	874	1,046.24	1,085.24		
Alliance	Brian English	7.74%	581	583.64	584.64	625.64	648.64	630.6	696.6	705.84	728.84	741.84	1,096.84	
UUP	J. A. Johnston	11.29%	848	879.44	879.44	883.44	883.44	888.88	892.88	984	984.24	986.24	1,003.96	1,076.96
UUP	H. McCourt	9.41%	707	736.52	736.52	737.52	737.52	746.68	746.68	831.28	831.28	832.28	838.52	984.88
UUP	Frank Dale	8.55%	642	707.04	707.04	711.04	711.04	718.4	718.4	781.84	783.08	783.08	795.32	977.96
Republican Clubs	P. Mallon	5.42%	407	407	410	412	484	484	496	496	520	813	831	831.24
DUP	H. W. Glass	3.41%	256	397.84	398.84	398.84	398.84	559.84	560.84	564.56	565.8	565.8	570.8	
Alliance	M. Qvam	3.25%	244	244.48	244.48	313.72	313.72	314.96	419.96	421.44	428.44	431.44		
Republican Clubs	T. E. Bell	4.10%	308	308	310	312	335	335	346	346	369			
SDLP	M. J. Duggan	2.73%	205	205.96	245.96	248.96	256.96	256.96	269.96	269.96				
UUP	Jack Mathers	3.20%	240	249.12	249.12	251.12	251.12	256.08	256.08					
Alliance	L. McParland	2.80%	210	210	215	243	251	251						
DUP	W. H. Percy	1.94%	146	192.8	192.8	192.8	192.8							
Ind. Republican	P. J. McNally	2.14%	161	161	167	169								
Alliance	J. M. Smythe	2.10%	158	158.24	160.24									
SDLP	J. J. Durkin	1.04%	78	78										
Electorate: 13,624 Valid: 7,510 (55.12%) Spoilt: 325 Quota: 1,073 Turnout: 7,835 (57.51%)

=== Area D ===
1973: 4 x UUP, 2 x DUP, 1 x Vanguard

Craigavon Area D - 7 seats
Party	Candidate	FPv%	Count												
Party	Candidate	FPv%	1	2	3	4	5	6	7	8	9	10	11	12	13
UUP	James Baird	22.59%	2,100												
UUP	Sydney Cairns	12.76%	1,186												
UUP	Thomas Creith	7.51%	698	1,280.56											
Vanguard	Philip Black	9.04%	840	873	875.08	875.08	884.12	953.72	954.72	1,124.76	1,125.51	1,165.99			
DUP	David Calvert	5.84%	543	568.08	569.28	569.28	624.6	634.6	638.6	666.68	667.63	958.35	969.36	1,281.36	
UUP	Thomas Megarrell	7.50%	697	868.6	957	958.24	966.24	971.68	988.56	1,007.8	1,015.57	1,026.38	1,068.92	1,164.64	
DUP	Thomas Willey	6.71%	624	641.16	642.84	643.84	688.92	694.36	700.56	727	727.84	882.39	840.33	992.15	1,105.83
Alliance	M. Damaglou	3.65%	339	345.16	346.6	392.64	392.64	392.64	522	523	523.28	526.73	923.05	935.23	939.64
Vanguard	L. Adamson	5.77%	536	547.88	548.92	549.92	538.08	616.4	616.48	695.48	695.76	720.79	724.23		
Alliance	H. Gregg	3.23%	300	314.52	315.64	344.52	346.52	348.52	490.64	491.88	492.16	497.61			
DUP	D. C. Biggerstaff	4.40%	409	442.88	444.08	444.08	459.6	463.6	465.58	488.2	488.68				
Vanguard	I. Major	2.89%	269	274.28	275.08	275.08	283.08	354.2	354.28						
Alliance	C. Philips	2.88%	268	274.6	275.68	311.88	312.84	314.84							
Vanguard	J. E. McCambley	2.32%	216	219.52	220.4	221.4	228								
DUP	R. Dawson	1.68%	156	162.16	164	164									
Alliance	J. A. Lewis	1.24%	115	116.76	117.16										
Electorate: 13,194 Valid: 9,296 (70.46%) Spoilt: 184 Quota: 1,163 Turnout: 9,480 (71.85%)
