= Craigavon Area D =

District electoral areas in Craigavon, Northern Ireland

Craigavon Area D was one of the four district electoral areas in Craigavon, Northern Ireland which existed from 1973 to 1985. The district elected seven members to Craigavon Borough Council, and formed part of the Armagh constituencies for the Northern Ireland Assembly and UK Parliament.

It was created for the 1973 local elections, and contained the wards of Bleary, Church, Knocknashane, Magheralin, Mourneview, Parklake and Waringstown. It was abolished for the 1985 local elections and replaced by the Lurgan DEA.

== Councillors ==
Election	Councillor (Party)	Councillor (Party)	Councillor (Party)	Councillor (Party)	Councillor (Party)	Councillor (Party)	Councillor (Party)
1981	Sydney Cairns (UUP)	Samuel Gardiner (UUP)	George Savage (UUP)	Ian Williams (DUP)	Frederick Baird (DUP)	David Calvert (DUP)	Philip Black (UUUP)/ (Vanguard)
1977	Sydney Cairns (UUP)	James Baird (UUP)	Thomas Creith (UUP)	Eric Crozier (UUP)	Thomas Willey (DUP)	David Calvert (DUP)	Philip Black (UUUP)/ (Vanguard)
1973	Sydney Cairns (UUP)	James Baird (UUP)	Thomas Creith (UUP)	Thomas Megarrell (UUP)	Thomas Willey (DUP)	David Calvert (DUP)	Philip Black (UUUP)/ (Vanguard)

== 1981 Election ==
1977: 4 x UUP, 2 x DUP, 1 x UUUP

1981: 3 x UUP, 3 x DUP, 1 x UUUP

1977-1981 Change: DUP gain from UUP

Craigavon Area D - 7 seats
Party	Candidate	FPv%	Count					
Party	Candidate	FPv%	1	2	3	4	5	6
DUP	Frederick Baird*	17.03%	1,570					
DUP	David Calvert*	12.14%	1,119	1,284.36				
UUP	Sydney Cairns*	12.49%	1,151	1,179.08				
UUP	Samuel Gardiner	12.27%	1,131	1,142.96	1,146.16	1,397.16		
UUP	George Savage	11.15%	1,028	1,032.68	1,034.48	1,153.48		
DUP	Ian Williams	9.46%	872	997.06	1,104.86	1,123.96	1,156.96	
UUUP	Philip Black*	8.57%	790	842.26	850.26	877.22	983.22	1,439.22
SDLP	Gary Kennedy	6.93%	639	639.26	639.26	639.26	640.26	648.26
UUUP	Thomas Megarrell	5.27%	486	497.96	500.36	519.74	546.74	
UUP	Samuel Lutton	4.69%	432	436.94	438.94			
Electorate: 13,017 Valid: 9,218 (70.82%) Spoilt: 237 Quota: 1,153 Turnout: 9,455 (72.64%)

== 1977 Election ==
1973: 4 x UUP, 2 x DUP, 1 x Vanguard

1977: 4 x UUP, 2 x DUP, 1 x UUUP

1973-1977 Change: Vanguard joins UUUP

Craigavon Area D - 7 seats
Party	Candidate	FPv%	Count						
Party	Candidate	FPv%	1	2	3	4	5	6	7
DUP	David Calvert*	13.63%	1,081						
UUUP	Philip Black*	10.68%	847	969	1,011				
UUP	James Baird*	11.54%	915	928	933	937	1,016		
DUP	Thomas Willey*	8.55%	678	703	922	989.76	994.76		
UUP	Sydney Cairns*	10.55%	837	849	874	880.64	927.64	1,197.64	
UUP	Eric Crozier	8.94%	709	715	720	723.12	791.28	917.6	998.94
UUP	Thomas Creith*	8.62%	684	687	689	690.76	765.76	876	997.52
SDLP	Brid Rodgers	8.88%	704	704	704	704.08	802.16	808.16	810.12
UUP	Thomas Megarrell*	6.38%	506	511	520	521.52	565.52		
Alliance	Charles Phillips	5.94%	471	472	472	472.32			
DUP	Harold Glass	3.78%	300	313					
UUUP	John Dummigan	2.52%	200						
Electorate: 13,004 Valid: 7,932 (61.00%) Spoilt: 366 Quota: 992 Turnout: 8,298 (63.81%)

=== Area D ===
1973: 4 x UUP, 2 x DUP, 1 x Vanguard

Craigavon Area D - 7 seats
Party	Candidate	FPv%	Count												
Party	Candidate	FPv%	1	2	3	4	5	6	7	8	9	10	11	12	13
UUP	James Baird	22.59%	2,100												
UUP	Sydney Cairns	12.76%	1,186												
UUP	Thomas Creith	7.51%	698	1,280.56											
Vanguard	Philip Black	9.04%	840	873	875.08	875.08	884.12	953.72	954.72	1,124.76	1,125.51	1,165.99			
DUP	David Calvert	5.84%	543	568.08	569.28	569.28	624.6	634.6	638.6	666.68	667.63	958.35	969.36	1,281.36	
UUP	Thomas Megarrell	7.50%	697	868.6	957	958.24	966.24	971.68	988.56	1,007.8	1,015.57	1,026.38	1,068.92	1,164.64	
DUP	Thomas Willey	6.71%	624	641.16	642.84	643.84	688.92	694.36	700.56	727	727.84	882.39	840.33	992.15	1,105.83
Alliance	M. Damaglou	3.65%	339	345.16	346.6	392.64	392.64	392.64	522	523	523.28	526.73	923.05	935.23	939.64
Vanguard	L. Adamson	5.77%	536	547.88	548.92	549.92	538.08	616.4	616.48	695.48	695.76	720.79	724.23		
Alliance	H. Gregg	3.23%	300	314.52	315.64	344.52	346.52	348.52	490.64	491.88	492.16	497.61			
DUP	D. C. Biggerstaff	4.40%	409	442.88	444.08	444.08	459.6	463.6	465.58	488.2	488.68				
Vanguard	I. Major	2.89%	269	274.28	275.08	275.08	283.08	354.2	354.28						
Alliance	C. Philips	2.88%	268	274.6	275.68	311.88	312.84	314.84							
Vanguard	J. E. McCambley	2.32%	216	219.52	220.4	221.4	228								
DUP	R. Dawson	1.68%	156	162.16	164	164									
Alliance	J. A. Lewis	1.24%	115	116.76	117.16										
Electorate: 13,194 Valid: 9,296 (70.46%) Spoilt: 184 Quota: 1,163 Turnout: 9,480 (71.85%)
