= 1985 Craigavon Borough Council election =

Local government election in Northern Ireland

← 1981	15 May 1985	1989 →

All 26 seats to Craigavon Borough Council 14 seats needed for a majority
	First party	Second party	Third party
Party	UUP	DUP	SDLP
Seats won	11	6	5
Seat change	▲2	▼1	0
	Fourth party	Fifth party	Sixth party
Party	Sinn Féin	Workers' Party	Alliance
Seats won	2	2	0
Seat change	▲2	0	▼1
	Seventh party
Party	UUUP
Seats won	0
Seat change	▼1

Elections to Craigavon Borough Council were held on 15 May 1985 on the same day as the other Northern Irish local government elections. The election used four district electoral areas to elect a total of 26 councillors.

== Election results ==
Craigavon Borough Council Election Result 1985
Party	Seats	Gains	Losses	Net gain/loss	Seats %	Votes %	Votes	+/−
UUP	11	2	0	▲2	42.3	36.1	11,084	▲5.3
DUP	6	0	1	▼1	23.1	25.7	7,900	▼1.4
SDLP	5	0	0	0	19.2	17.2	5,286	▼3.6
Sinn Féin	2	2	0	▲2	7.7	11.5	3,522	New
Workers' Party	2	0	0	0	7.7	5.2	1,608	▼4.2
Alliance	0	0	2	▼2	0.0	4.3	1,311	▲0.2

Note: "Votes" are the first preference votes.

== Districts summary ==
Results of the Craigavon Borough Council election, 1985 by district
Ward	%	Cllrs	%	Cllrs	%	Cllrs	%	Cllrs	%	Cllrs	%	Cllrs	%	Cllrs	Total Cllrs
Ward	UUP		DUP		SDLP		Sinn Féin		Workers' Party		Alliance		Others		Total Cllrs
Craigavon Central	38.9	3	30.7	2	11.4	1	7.2	0	7.0	1	4.8	0	0.0	0	7
Loughside	11.5	1	6.6	0	40.3	2	23.2	1	18.4	1	0.0	0	0.0	0	5
Lurgan	48.0	4	30.6	2	9.6	1	6.8	0	0.0	0	5.0	0	0.0	0	7
Portadown	38.5	3	29.4	2	14.3	1	12.0	1	0.0	0	5.8	0	0.0	0	7
Total	36.1	11	25.7	6	17.2	5	11.5	2	5.2	2	4.3	0	0.0	0	26

== District results ==
=== Craigavon Central ===
1985: 3 x UUP, 2 x DUP, 1 x SDLP, 1 x Workers' Party

Craigavon Central - 7 seats
Party	Candidate	FPv%	Count				
Party	Candidate	FPv%	1	2	3	4	5
UUP	Mary Simpson*	17.54%	1,359				
DUP	William Smith*	14.84%	1,150				
UUP	Samuel McCammick	13.06%	1,012				
SDLP	Brid Rodgers*	11.40%	883				
UUP	Cyril McLoughlin*	8.27%	641	970.44			
Workers' Party	Tom French*	6.97%	540	541.16	542.44	658.37	931.37
DUP	Robert Dodds*	8.91%	690	706.24	791.52	810.96	813.96
DUP	Meredith Patterson	6.92%	536	563.55	645.63	693.14	694.14
Sinn Féin	Sheena Campbell	7.15%	554	554	554	556	
Alliance	Sean Hagan	3.85%	298	308.15	310.55		
Alliance	James Woods	1.10%	85	88.48	89.6		
Electorate: 13,002 Valid: 7,748 (59.59%) Spoilt: 151 Quota: 969 Turnout: 7,899 (60.75%)

=== Loughside ===
1985: 2 x SDLP, 1 x Sinn Féin, 1 x Workers' Party, 1 x UUP

Loughside - 5 seats
Party	Candidate	FPv%	Count						
Party	Candidate	FPv%	1	2	3	4	5	6	7
SDLP	Sean McCavanagh*	17.01%	990						
Workers' Party	Padraig Breen*	16.10%	937	1,028					
UUP	Thomas Bell	11.50%	669	671	1,049				
Sinn Féin	Brendan Curran	14.38%	837	839	839	839	857.6	1,328.6	
SDLP	Peter Bunting	13.78%	802	820	820	844	866.32	880.32	929.32
SDLP	Patrick Crilly*	9.54%	555	565	565	576	589.02	600.88	655.88
Sinn Féin	Michael McKee	8.87%	516	520	521	521	524.72		
DUP	Robert Russell	6.56%	382	382					
Workers' Party	Karen McStravick	2.25%	131						
Electorate: 9,941 Valid: 5,819 (58.54%) Spoilt: 227 Quota: 970 Turnout: 6,046 (60.82%)

=== Lurgan ===
1985: 4 x UUP, 2 x DUP, 1 x SDLP

Lurgan - 7 seats
Party	Candidate	FPv%	Count					
Party	Candidate	FPv%	1	2	3	4	5	6
UUP	Samuel Gardiner*	20.04%	1,690					
DUP	Frederick Baird*	15.68%	1,322					
UUP	George Savage*	12.69%	1,070					
UUP	Philip Black*	10.50%	885	1,189.51				
UUP	Sydney Cairns*	4.80%	405	621.45	656.45	766.85	1,019.52	
SDLP	Hugh News*	9.58%	808	808.37	808.97	808.97	887.17	1,234.17
DUP	David Calvert*	8.98%	757	806.58	954.98	964.58	990.47	992.63
DUP	Ian Williams*	5.93%	500	528.86	596.26	601.06	641.34	641.34
Sinn Féin	Patrick Little	6.80%	573	573	573	573.16	575.16	
Alliance	Gordon Burrell	5.00%	422	443.83	452.03	454.43		
Electorate: 13,157 Valid: 8,432 (64.09%) Spoilt: 147 Quota: 1,055 Turnout: 8,579 (65.20%)

=== Portadown ===
1985: 3 x UUP, 2 x DUP, 1 x SDLP, 1 x Sinn Féin

Portadown - 7 seats
Party	Candidate	FPv%	Count								
Party	Candidate	FPv%	1	2	3	4	5	6	7	8	9
DUP	Gladys McCullough*	16.87%	1,470								
UUP	James Gillespie*	15.36%	1,338								
UUP	Arnold Hatch*	13.06%	1,138								
UUP	Alan Locke*	7.16%	624	664.04	734.6	734.6	1,070.34	1,109.34			
SDLP	Ignatius Fox	9.02%	786	786	786.18	810.18	810.18	810.18	1,167.18		
DUP	Michael Briggs	8.79%	766	898.34	908.24	908.24	943.76	946.24	946.24	946.24	1,225.24
Sinn Féin	Brian McCann	8.22%	716	716	716.18	981.18	981.18	981.22	1,044.22	1,076.12	1,076.12
Alliance	William Ramsay*	5.81%	506	520.3	525.52	527.52	547.44	549.24	588.24	632.32	689.42
DUP	Ronald Williamson	3.75%	327	493.66	501.22	501.22	519.66	521.18	522.36	522.65	
SDLP	Mario McCooe	5.30%	462	462	462.18	487.18	488.18	488.18			
UUP	Robert Hughes	2.90%	253	277.7	420.98	420.98					
Sinn Féin	Sean Dunbar	3.74%	326	326	326						
Electorate: 13,741 Valid: 8,712 (63.40%) Spoilt: 191 Quota: 1,090 Turnout: 8,903 (64.79%)
