= Craigavon Area A =

District electoral areas in Craigavon, Northern Ireland

Craigavon Area A was one of the four district electoral areas in Craigavon, Northern Ireland which existed from 1973 to 1985. The district elected five members to Craigavon Borough Council, and formed part of the Armagh constituencies for the Northern Ireland Assembly and UK Parliament.

It was created for the 1973 local elections, and contained the wards of Aghagallon, Belle Vue, Kinnegoe, The Birches and Woodville. It was abolished for the 1985 local elections and replaced by the Loughside DEA.

== Councillors ==
Election	Councillor (Party)	Councillor (Party)	Councillor (Party)	Councillor (Party)	Councillor (Party)
1981	James Gillespie (UUP)	Sean McCavanagh (SDLP)	Patrick Crilly (SDLP)	James McDonald (SDLP)/ (Independent Nationalist)	Padraig Breen (Republican Clubs)
1977	James Gillespie (UUP)	Sean McCavanagh (SDLP)	Patrick Crilly (SDLP)	James McDonald (SDLP)/ (Independent Nationalist)	Malachy McGurran (Republican Clubs)
1973	W. N. Rodgers (UUP)	Frederick Baird (DUP)	Patrick Crilly (SDLP)	James McDonald (SDLP)/ (Independent Nationalist)	Donnell Deeny (Alliance)

== 1981 Election ==
1977: 3 x SDLP, 1 x Republican Clubs, 1 x UUP

1981: 3 x SDLP, 1 x Republican Clubs, 1 x UUP

1977-1981 Change: No change

Craigavon Area A - 5 seats
Party	Candidate	FPv%	Count				
Party	Candidate	FPv%	1	2	3	4	5
Republican Clubs	Padraig Breen	19.44%	1,200				
SDLP	James McDonald*	16.18%	999	1,032.2			
SDLP	Patrick Crilly*	10.56%	652	715.4	762.4	1,166.4	
SDLP	Sean McCavanagh*	14.04%	867	915	973.8	1,117.8	
UUP	James Gillespie*	11.86%	732	734.4	894.2	897.2	925.2
DUP	Victor Pickering	12.41%	766	766.4	786.4	786.6	795.6
SDLP	Ignatius Fox	9.12%	563	580	603.8		
Independent Socialist	Joseph Cunningham	3.11%	192	214.4			
UUP	William Lyness	2.96%	183	184.2			
Electorate: 8,797 Valid: 6,174 (70.18%) Spoilt: 245 Quota: 1,030 Turnout: 6,419 (72.97%)

== 1977 Election ==
1973: 1 x SDLP, 1 x UUP, 1 x Alliance, 1 x DUP, 1 x Independent Nationalist

1977: 3 x SDLP, 1 x Republican Clubs, 1 x UUP

1973-1977 Change: SDLP and Republican Clubs gain from Alliance and DUP, Independent Nationalist joins SDLP

Craigavon Area A - 5 seats
Party	Candidate	FPv%	Count					
Party	Candidate	FPv%	1	2	3	4	5	6
SDLP	James McDonald*	18.68%	1,013					
SDLP	Sean McCavanagh	16.56%	898	964.4				
Republican Clubs	Malachy McGurran	16.00%	868	875.5	877.5	882.72	1,072.72	
SDLP	Patrick Crilly*	10.71%	581	595.6	596.7	646.83	916.83	
UUP	James Gillespie	8.19%	444	444.5	723.6	723.6	751.69	767.69
DUP	Frederick Baird*	12.83%	696	696.2	737.6	737.6	740.97	742.97
Alliance	Donnell Deeny*	10.75%	583	591.3	601.4	605.27		
UUP	Eric McKeown	6.29%	341	341.8				
Electorate: 8,541 Valid: 5,424 (63.51%) Spoilt: 321 Quota: 905 Turnout: 5,745 (67.26%)

== 1973 Election ==
1973: 1 x SDLP, 1 x UUP, 1 x Alliance, 1 x DUP, 1 x Independent Nationalist

Craigavon Area A - 5 seats
Party	Candidate	FPv%	Count									
Party	Candidate	FPv%	1	2	3	4	5	6	7	8	9	10
SDLP	Patrick Crilly	8.91%	521	535	569	569	594	1,023				
UUP	W. N. Rodgers	11.63%	680	680	680	760	760	760	1,304			
DUP	Frederick Baird	7.05%	412	412	412	710	710	710	767	1,058.2		
Alliance	Donnell Deeny	9.99%	584	603	808	808	832	890	904	929.9	967.7	975.89
Ind. Nationalist	James McDonald	14.04%	821	844	861	861	888	913	915	923.4	936	969.28
Republican Clubs	T. Fleville	7.13%	417	478	495	495	864	891	891	891	891	897.24
UUP	W. Monroe	10.53%	616	616	616	622	622	622				
SDLP	T. Mackle	8.84%	517	528	537	537	548					
Republican Clubs	J. Mulholland	6.60%	386	452	464	464						
DUP	William Stothers	6.74%	394	394	394							
Alliance	B. Casey	4.74%	277	297								
Ind. Republican	K. Toman	3.81%	223									
Electorate: 9,065 Valid: 5,848 (64.51%) Spoilt: 155 Quota: 975 Turnout: 6,003 (66.22%)
