= Craigavon Area B =

District electoral areas in Craigavon, Northern Ireland

Craigavon Area B was one of the four district electoral areas in Craigavon, Northern Ireland which existed from 1973 to 1985. The district elected seven members to Craigavon Borough Council, and formed part of the Armagh constituencies for the Northern Ireland Assembly and UK Parliament.

It was created for the 1973 local elections, and contained the wards of Annagh, Breagh, Brownstown, Edgarstown, Hartfield, Tavanagh and Woodside. It was abolished for the 1985 local elections and mainly replaced by the Portadown DEA.

== Councillors ==
Election	Councillor (Party)	Councillor (Party)	Councillor (Party)	Councillor (Party)	Councillor (Party)	Councillor (Party)	Councillor (Party)
1981	Herbert Whitten (UUP)	Alan Locke (UUP)	Arnold Hatch (UUP)	Gladys McCullough (DUP)	James Forsythe (DUP)	William Ramsey (Alliance)	Daniel Murphy (SDLP)
1977	Herbert Whitten (UUP)	Alan Locke (UUP)	John Wright (UUP)/ (Independent Unionist)	Gladys McCullough (DUP)	Sean Hagan (Alliance)	William Ramsey (Alliance)	Daniel Murphy (SDLP)
1973	Herbert Whitten (UUP)	Alan Locke (UUP)	John Wright (UUP)/ (Independent Unionist)	Samuel McCammick (Vanguard)	Sean Hagan (Alliance)	William Ramsey (Alliance)	C. Atkinson (Vanguard)

== 1981 Election ==
1977: 3 x UUP, 2 x Alliance, 1 x DUP, 1 x SDLP

1981: 3 x UUP, 2 x DUP, 1 x Alliance, 1 x SDLP

1977-1981 Change: DUP gain from Alliance

Craigavon Area B - 7 seats
Party	Candidate	FPv%	Count							
Party	Candidate	FPv%	1	2	3	4	5	6	7	8
UUP	Herbert Whitten*	21.99%	1,785							
SDLP	Daniel Murphy*	16.54%	1,343							
DUP	Gladys McCullough*	13.88%	1,127							
UUP	Alan Locke*	8.18%	664	1,138.72						
DUP	James Forsythe	9.88%	802	829.95	830.21	834.83	957.03	1,019.93		
UUP	Arnold Hatch	6.38%	518	695.59	695.59	800.31	821.13	830.73	996.41	1,009.67
Alliance	William Ramsay*	5.11%	415	448.11	479.05	483.56	492.39	495.19	521.11	876.6
Republican Clubs	Dermot Hamill	6.66%	541	541	701.68	702.01	703.27	703.27	705.8	798.17
Alliance	Sean Hagan*	4.43%	360	365.16	493.6	494.48	496.74	497.14	504.63	
DUP	Frederick Richardson	4.14%	336	360.51	360.51	361.83	437.81	471.11		
DUP	John Oliver	2.80%	227	244.2	244.72	246.59				
Electorate: 12,023 Valid: 8,118 (67.52%) Spoilt: 326 Quota: 1,015 Turnout: 8,444 (70.23%)

== 1977 Election ==
1973: 2 x UUP, 2 x Alliance, 2 x Vanguard, 1 x Independent Unionist

1977: 3 x UUP, 2 x Alliance, 1 x DUP, 1 x SDLP

1973-1977 Change: DUP and SDLP gain from Vanguard (two seats), Independent Unionist joins UUP

Craigavon Area B - 7 seats
Party	Candidate	FPv%	Count											
Party	Candidate	FPv%	1	2	3	4	5	6	7	8	9	10	11	12
UUP	Herbert Whitten*	25.60%	1,863											
UUP	John Wright*	6.28%	457	919.57										
UUP	Alan Locke*	6.32%	460	779.66	808.21	812.76	834.33	931.33						
DUP	Gladys McCullough	7.50%	546	562.83	565.83	593.34	682.91	712.03	910.03					
SDLP	Daniel Murphy	11.05%	804	804	804	804	804	804	804	1,203				
Alliance	Sean Hagan*	11.31%	823	827.08	834.08	835.08	841.08	850.08	854.08	900.08	1,130.63			
Alliance	William Ramsay*	6.64%	483	511.56	511.56	516.56	525.56	559.17	570.25	577.25	637.28	788.66	797.66	800.42
DUP	James Forsythe	6.84%	498	508.71	510.22	519.73	561.81	605.95	782.21	783.21	784.08	784.08	795.96	798.19
SDLP	Mary Mackle	6.28%	457	457	457	458	458	458	459					
DUP	William Stothers	4.75%	346	364.36	364.36	376.87	400.91	424.48						
Vanguard	Samuel McCammick*	2.90%	211	245.68	274.7	279.21	292.74							
UUUP	John Lyttle	1.98%	144	159.3	163.81	231.34								
UUUP	James McBratney	1.80%	131	137.12	139.12									
Vanguard	William Lappin	0.74%	54	58.59										
Electorate: 12,358 Valid: 7,277 (58.88%) Spoilt: 390 Quota: 910 Turnout: 7,667 (62.04%)

=== Area B ===
1973: 2 x UUP, 2 x Alliance, 2 x Vanguard, 1 x Independent Unionist

Craigavon Area B - 7 seats
Party	Candidate	FPv%	Count											
Party	Candidate	FPv%	1	2	3	4	5	6	7	8	9	10	11	12
UUP	Herbert Whitten	25.44%	2,273											
Alliance	Sean Hagan	16.32%	1,458											
Vanguard	Samuel McCammick	7.65%	683	710.03	710.26	711.77	742.3	804.87	808.38	808.61	823.12	1,197.12		
Vanguard	C. Atkinson	10.14%	906	936.6	936.83	937.83	954.85	988.89	990.12	991.12	1,008.32	1,170.22		
Alliance	William Ramsay	4.32%	386	416.09	535.23	541.38	542.4	550.44	735.99	883.13	1,114.79	1,124.79		
UUP	Alan Locke	6.32%	565	972.49	972.49	973.49	979.02	994.1	1,001.58	1,001.58	1,071.92	1,110.53	1,116.53	1,120.6
Ind. Unionist	John Wright	6.96%	621	720.45	723.44	723.67	730.2	762.26	767.61	793.6	850.99	916.54	971.54	1,012.61
UUP	J. Toal	3.77%	337	826.6	826.6	826.6	831.15	843.17	845.17	845.17	891.29	923.37	937.37	944.77
DUP	James Forsythe	6.06%	541	551.71	551.71	553.28	650.75	688.26	688.26	688.26	698.77			
NI Labour	T. Newell	3.45%	308	335.03	355.73	393.62	397.62	401.64	427.33	488.61				
Republican Clubs	M. Smith	4.04%	361	361	404.47	405.39	405.39	405.39	415.06					
Alliance	O. Henry	1.05%	94	96.55	231.56	243.55	245.55	245.55						
Vanguard	J. Robinson	2.00%	179	195.83	195.83	195.83	205.34							
DUP	A. Gracey	1.86%	166	177.73	177.73	178.73								
NI Labour	J. Clarke	0.62%	55	56.53	63.43									
Electorate: 12,948 Valid: 8,933 (68.99%) Spoilt: 123 Quota: 1,117 Turnout: 9,056 (69.94%)
