= Lurgan (District Electoral Area) =

District electoral area in Northern Ireland

- Armagh City, Banbridge and Craigavon Borough Council DEA constituency

Current constituency
- Created: 1985
- Seats: 7 (1985-)
- Councillors: Chloe Devine (SF); Peter Haire (DUP); Keith Haughian (SF); Peter Lavery (APNI); Liam Mackle (SF); Stephen Moutray (DUP); Mary O'Dowd (SF)

Lurgan DEA within Armagh City, Banbridge and Craigavon

Lurgan DEA (1993-2014) within Craigavon

Lurgan is one of the seven district electoral areas (DEA) in Armagh City, Banbridge and Craigavon, Northern Ireland. The district elects seven members to Armagh City, Banbridge and Craigavon Borough Council and contains the wards of Aghagallon, Knocknashane, Lough Road, Magheralin, Mourneview, Parklake and Shankill. Lurgan forms part of the Upper Bann constituencies for the Northern Ireland Assembly and UK Parliament.

It was created for the 1985 local elections, replacing Craigavon Area D which had existed since 1973, where it contained seven wards (Church, Knocknashane, Magheralin, Mourneview, Parklake, Taghnevan and Waringstown). For the 2014 local elections it gained much of the abolished Loughside DEA around Aghagallon, while losing areas to the new Lagan River DEA around Waringstown.

== Councillors ==
Election	Councillor (party)	Councillor (party)	Councillor (party)	Councillor (party)	Councillor (party)	Councillor (party)	Councillor (party)
June 2026 Co-Option	Keith Haughian (Sinn Féin)	Liam Mackle (Sinn Féin)	Chloe Devine (Sinn Féin)	Mary O'Dowd (Sinn Féin)	Peter Lavery (Alliance)	Peter Haire (DUP)	Stephen Moutray (DUP)
2023	Keith Haughian (Sinn Féin)	Liam Mackle (Sinn Féin)	Sorchá McGeown (Sinn Féin)	Mary O'Dowd (Sinn Féin)	Peter Lavery (Alliance)	Peter Haire (DUP)	Stephen Moutray (DUP)
January 2021 Co-Option	Keith Haughian (Sinn Féin)	Liam Mackle (Sinn Féin)	Sorchá McGeown (Sinn Féin)	Ciarán Toman (SDLP)	Peter Lavery (Alliance)	Louise McKinstry (UUP)	Stephen Moutray (DUP)
2019	Keith Haughian (Sinn Féin)	Liam Mackle (Sinn Féin)	Sorchá McGeown (Sinn Féin)	Joe Nelson (SDLP)	Peter Lavery (Alliance)	Louise McKinstry (UUP)	Stephen Moutray (DUP)
December 2018 Co-Option	Keith Haughian (Sinn Féin)	Liam Mackle (Sinn Féin)	Catherine Nelson (Sinn Féin)	Joe Nelson (SDLP)	Terry McWilliams (DUP)	Colin McCusker (UUP)	Stephen Moutray (DUP)
June 2018 Co-Option	Keith Haughian (Sinn Féin)	Liam Mackle (Sinn Féin)	Máire Cairns (Sinn Féin)	Joe Nelson (SDLP)	Terry McWilliams (DUP)	Colin McCusker (UUP)	Philip Moutray (DUP)
June 2016 Co-Options	Keith Haughian (Sinn Féin)	Catherine Seeley (Sinn Féin)	Máire Cairns (Sinn Féin)	Joe Nelson (SDLP)	Terry McWilliams (DUP)	Colin McCusker (UUP)	Philip Moutray (DUP)
2014	Keith Haughian (Sinn Féin)	Catherine Seeley (Sinn Féin)	Máire Cairns (Sinn Féin)	Joe Nelson (SDLP)	Carla Lockhart (DUP)	Colin McCusker (UUP)	Philip Moutray (DUP)
2011	Liam Mackle (Sinn Féin)	George Savage (UUP)	Jo-Anne Dobson (UUP)	Meta Crozier (UUP)	Carla Lockhart (DUP)	Mark Baxter (DUP)	Stephen Moutray (DUP)
2005	Maurice Magill (Sinn Féin)	George Savage (UUP)	Samuel Gardiner (UUP)	Meta Crozier (UUP)	Fergie Dawson (DUP)	Mark Russell (DUP)	Stephen Moutray (DUP)
2001	Mary McNally (SDLP)	George Savage (UUP)	Samuel Gardiner (UUP)	Meta Crozier (UUP)	Sydney Cairns (UUP)	Jonathan Bell (DUP)/ (UUP)	Stephen Moutray (DUP)
1997	Mary McNally (SDLP)	George Savage (UUP)	Samuel Gardiner (UUP)	Meta Crozier (UUP)	Sydney Cairns (UUP)	Jonathan Bell (DUP)/ (UUP)	Ruth Allen (DUP)
1993	Mary McNally (SDLP)	Samuel Lutton (UUP)	Audrey Savage (UUP)	Meta Crozier (UUP)	Sydney Cairns (UUP)	Donald MacKay (UUP)	Ruth Allen (DUP)
1989	Brid Rodgers (SDLP)	Samuel Lutton (UUP)	Audrey Savage (UUP)	Meta Crozier (UUP)	Sydney Cairns (UUP)	Yvonne Calvert (DUP)	Ruth Allen (DUP)
1985	Hugh News (SDLP)	George Savage (UUP)	Samuel Gardiner (UUP)	Philip Black (UUP)	Sydney Cairns (UUP)	Frederick Baird (DUP)	David Calvert (DUP)

== 2023 election ==
2019: 3 x Sinn Féin, 1 x DUP, 1 x SDLP, 1 x UUP, 1 x Alliance

2023: 4 x Sinn Féin, 2 x DUP, 1 x Alliance

2019–2023 change: Sinn Féin gain from SDLP, DUP gain from UUP

Lurgan - 7 seats
Party	Candidate	FPv%	Count						
Party	Candidate	FPv%	1	2	3	4	5	6	7
Sinn Féin	Keith Haughian*	15.29%	2,153						
Alliance	Peter Lavery*	13.33%	1,877						
DUP	Peter Haire	13.13%	1,849						
Sinn Féin	Liam Mackle*	13.03%	1,835						
Sinn Féin	Sorchá McGeown* †	9.23%	1,299	1,615.44	1,632.90	1,633.26	1,666.34	2,048.34	
Sinn Féin	Mary O'Dowd	11.04%	1,554	1,586.04	1,591.92	1,591.92	1,625.20	1,926.20	
DUP	Stephen Moutray*	10.06%	1,416	1,416.36	1,419.30	1,479.26	1,479.38	1,492.08	1,497.08
UUP	Louise McKinstry*	7.84%	1,104	1,104.72	1,125.36	1,137.52	1,137.64	1,229.68	1,312.68
SDLP	Ciarán Toman*	7.04%	991	1,024.66	1,079.80	1,080.32	1,086.48		
Electorate: 26,807 Valid: 14,078 (52.52%) Spoilt: 221 Quota: 1,760 Turnout: 14,299 (53.34%)

== 2019 election ==
2014: 3 x Sinn Féin, 2 x DUP, 1 x UUP, 1 x SDLP

2019: 3 x Sinn Féin, 1 x DUP, 1 x UUP, 1 x SDLP, 1 x Alliance

2014-2019 change: Alliance gain from DUP

Lurgan - 7 seats
Party	Candidate	FPv%	Count					
Party	Candidate	FPv%	1	2	3	4	5	6
Sinn Féin	Keith Haughlan*	16.39%	1,974					
UUP	Louise McKinstry	12.65%	1,524					
Sinn Féin	Liam Mackle	9.88%	1,190	1,362.32	1,595.32			
SDLP	Joe Nelson* †	8.68%	1,046	1,060.64	1,104.52	1,860.52		
Alliance	Peter Lavery	10.97%	1,321	1,347.16	1,371.12	1,462.28	1,701.05	
DUP	Stephen Moutray*	12.48%	1,504	1,504.24	1,504.24	1,504.24	1,504.87	1,505.5
Sinn Féin	Sorcha McGeown	6.83%	823	1,010.44	1,195.4	1,255.84	1,388.61	1,457.44
DUP	Terry McWilliams*	10.64%	1,282	1,282.64	1,283.64	1,284.64	1,285.5	1,286.13
SDLP	Ciarán Toman	7.71%	928	948.08	957.72			
Sinn Féin	Noel McGeown	3.77%	454	496.88				
Electorate: 25,336 Valid: 12,044 (47.54%) Spoilt: 251 Quota: 1,506 Turnout: 12,295 (48.53%)

== 2014 election ==
2011: 3 x DUP, 3 x UUP, 1 x Sinn Féin

2014: 3 x Sinn Féin, 2 x DUP, 1 x UUP, 1 x SDLP

2011-2014 change: Sinn Féin (two seats) and SDLP gain from UUP (two seats) and DUP

Lurgan - 7 seats
Party	Candidate	FPv%	Count													
Party	Candidate	FPv%	1	2	3	4	5	6	7	8	9	10	11	12	13	14
DUP	Carla Lockhart* †	17.50%	2,013													
SDLP	Joe Nelson*	7.29%	839	839.28	842.28	932.28	937.28	937.28	937.28	979.28	1,125.84	1,632.84				
UUP	Colin McCusker*	7.85%	903	997.64	1,011.92	1,011.92	1,052.32	1,133.4	1,306.68	1,307.96	1,353.8	1,357.8	1,364.68	1,802.68		
DUP	Philip Moutray* †	5.07%	583	920.68	931.24	931.24	973.88	1,054.84	1,169.36	1,169.92	1,199.6	1,210.16	1,211.02	1,520.02		
Sinn Féin	Máire Cairns †	8.71%	1,002	1,002.28	1,004.28	1,010.28	1,013.28	1,015.28	1,017.56	1,103.56	1,137.56	1,173.56	1,211.4	1,218.24	1,232.24	1,240.24
Sinn Féin	Keith Haughian	8.09%	930	930	931	936	939	939	940	1,043	1,085	1,133	1,184.6	1,185.44	1,189.44	1,193.44
Sinn Féin	Catherine Seeley* †	7.34%	844	844	844	851	854	854	856	945	971.28	1.009.28	1,076.36	1,080.92	1,089.92	1,102.92
Sinn Féin	Noel McGeown*	6.57%	756	757.12	758.12	761.12	764.12	764.12	765.12	975.12	1,004.12	1,059.12	1,085.78	1,086.78	1,091.78	1,093.78
UUP	Aaron Carson	4.67%	539	586.88	598.16	598.16	641.16	747.8	935.76	936.76	972.88	980.16	982.74			
SDLP	Pat McDade	5.63%	648	649.96	661.96	687.96	694.96	694.96	698.24	733.24	884.52					
Alliance	Peter Lavery	5.12%	589	592.36	654.76	660.76	677.04	679.32	684.6	700.6						
Sinn Féin	Liam Mackle*	5.10%	587	587.84	590.84	596.84	598.84	598.84	598.84							
TUV	Roy Ferguson	3.22%	370	390.72	392.72	393.72	443.68	537								
PUP	Lexi Davidson	2.79%	321	352.64	355.64	356.64	388.6									
UKIP	Jonny Johns	2.30%	264	276.88	280.16	281.44										
SDLP	Anna Ochal-Molenda	1.50%	173	173.28	175.28											
NI21	Stuart McClelland	1.23%	141	144.08												
Electorate: 23,950 Valid: 11,502 (48.03%) Spoilt: 233 Quota: 1,438 Turnout: 11,735 (49.00%)

== 2011 election ==
2005: 3 x DUP, 3 x UUP, 1 x Sinn Féin

2011: 3 x DUP, 3 x UUP, 1 x Sinn Féin

2005-2011 change: No change

Lurgan - 7 seats
Party	Candidate	FPv%	Count						
Party	Candidate	FPv%	1	2	3	4	5	6	7
DUP	Stephen Moutray*	19.95%	1,952						
UUP	Jo-Anne Dobson	13.40%	1,311						
UUP	Meta Crozier*	12.66%	1,239						
DUP	Carla Lockhart	9.73%	952	1,237					
Sinn Féin	Liam Mackle	9.81%	960	961.14	962.14	962.21	962.22	1,224.3	
UUP	George Savage*	9.25%	905	1,002.28	1,027.66	1,088.56	1,098.14	1,102.43	1,353.43
DUP	Mark Baxter	7.74%	757	1,047.7	1,066.6	1,078.5	1,079.37	1,089.89	1,204.89
Alliance	John Cleland	5.63%	551	557.08	583.46	588.85	589.29	727.86	747.86
TUV	David Calvert	5.19%	508	533.46	559.98	563.62	564.11	564.11	
SDLP	Pat McDade	5.41%	529	532.42	534.8	536.13	536.18		
UUP	Barbara Trotter	1.25%	122	128.46					
Electorate: 17,168 Valid: 9,786 (57.00%) Spoilt: 185 Quota: 1,224 Turnout: 9,971 (58.08%)

== 2005 election ==
2001: 4 x UUP, 2 x DUP, 1 x SDLP

2005: 3 x UUP, 3 x DUP, 1 x Sinn Féin

2001–2005 change: DUP and Sinn Féin gain from UUP and SDLP

Lurgan - 7 seats
Party	Candidate	FPv%	Count						
Party	Candidate	FPv%	1	2	3	4	5	6	7
UUP	Samuel Gardiner*	21.59%	2,109						
DUP	Stephen Moutray*	21.08%	2,059						
DUP	Fergie Dawson	11.27%	1,101	1,149.72	1,359.32				
DUP	Mark Russell	3.21%	314	354.74	707.54	764.22	1,245.46		
UUP	George Savage*	8.22%	803	1,005.86	1,041.46	1,047.18	1,075.52	1,112.1	1,257.1
Sinn Féin	Maurice Magill	7.51%	734	734	734.4	734.4	734.8	1,105.22	1,111.22
UUP	Meta Crozier*	4.44%	434	752.36	783.96	786.82	812.88	851.82	1,065.5
UUP	Sydney Cairns*	5.96%	582	755.88	769.48	770.52	788.94	825.2	953
Independent	David Calvert	6.41%	626	682.28	713.48	719.98	742.84	761.08	
SDLP	Francis McAlinden	6.48%	633	643.5	645.1	645.1	645.52		
DUP	Anne Harrison	3.82%	373	395.68	536.48	598.36			
Electorate: 15,320 Valid: 9,768 (63.76%) Spoilt: 171 Quota: 1,222 Turnout: 9,939 (64.88%)

== 2001 election ==
1997: 5 x UUP, 1 x DUP, 1 x SDLP

2001: 4 x UUP, 2 x DUP, 1 x SDLP

1997-2001 change: DUP gain from UUP

Lurgan - 7 seats
Party	Candidate	FPv%	Count					
Party	Candidate	FPv%	1	2	3	4	5	6
DUP	Jonathan Bell*	18.48%	1,942					
UUP	Samuel Gardiner*	16.44%	1,728					
DUP	Stephen Moutray	14.80%	1,555					
UUP	George Savage*	11.77%	1,237	1,315.07				
UUP	Meta Crozier*	9.18%	965	1,089.32	1,332.44			
UUP	Sydney Cairns*	7.13%	749	854.08	952.24	1,032.04	1,332.64	
SDLP	Mary McNally*	7.62%	801	806.92	813.64	816.11	842.63	1,342.63
UK Unionist	David Vance	3.88%	408	683.65	697.81	811.05	886.49	887.86
Sinn Féin	Matthew Rooney	6.84%	719	719.37	719.61	719.8	719.8	
UUP	William Tate	2.63%	276	290.8	325.6	356		
Independent	William Grafton	1.24%	130	147.76	150.4	160.66		
Electorate: 14,911 Valid: 10,510 (70.48%) Spoilt: 236 Quota: 1,314 Turnout: 10,746 (72.07%)

== 1997 election ==
1993: 5 x UUP, 1 x DUP, 1 x SDLP

1997: 5 x UUP, 1 x DUP, 1 x SDLP

1993-1997 change: No change

Lurgan - 7 seats
Party	Candidate	FPv%	Count							
Party	Candidate	FPv%	1	2	3	4	5	6	7	8
UUP	Samuel Gardiner	22.45%	1,802							
UUP	George Savage	17.08%	1,371							
UUP	Meta Crozier*	8.61%	691	1,034.2						
UUP	Jonathan Bell	8.16%	655	778.64	873.68	877.56	878.56	887.62	980.98	1,069.98
UUP	Sydney Cairns*	5.41%	434	526.84	619.72	623.97	623.97	630.51	742.26	961.02
SDLP	Mary McNally*	7.65%	614	615.76	616.3	634.3	877.3	877.33	953.87	959.29
DUP	Ruth Allen*	10.00%	803	840.4	866.59	868.86	868.86	870.09	889.36	922.32
DUP	Frederick Baird	7.76%	623	689.88	719.85	721.56	721.56	722.91	740.31	775.19
UUP	William McCullough	2.86%	230	335.6	438.74	442.55	444.99	449.46	485.06	
Alliance	Wilson Freeburn	4.86%	390	399.68	405.62	435.04	442.04	442.13		
Sinn Féin	Bernadette O'Hagan	4.35%	349	349.44	349.44	350.44				
Labour Coalition	Gillian Kirk	0.61%	49	51.2	53.9					
Labour Coalition	James Devlin	0.21%	17	18.32	18.59					
Electorate: 14,526 Valid: 8,028 (55.27%) Spoilt: 136 Quota: 1,004 Turnout: 8,164 (56.20%)

== 1993 election ==
1989: 4 x UUP, 2 x DUP, 1 x SDLP

1993: 5 x UUP, 1 x DUP, 1 x SDLP

1989-1993 change: UUP gain from DUP

Lurgan - 7 seats
Party	Candidate	FPv%	Count								
Party	Candidate	FPv%	1	2	3	4	5	6	7	8	9
UUP	Audrey Savage*	18.77%	1,472								
DUP	Ruth Allen*	15.03%	1,179								
UUP	Sydney Cairns*	12.31%	965	1,048.16							
UUP	Samuel Lutton*	11.44%	897	1,007.22							
UUP	Meta Crozier*	10.86%	852	959.91	987.28						
UUP	Donald MacKay	3.67%	288	318.03	324.15	385.81	417.31	428.59	431.03	687.6	927.54
SDLP	Mary McNally*	9.17%	719	720.65	720.99	724.99	724.99	725.07	725.07	726.07	858.48
DUP	David Martin	5.59%	438	463.08	616.59	640.61	645.41	648.05	649.77	713.26	760.02
Alliance	Wilson Freeburn	7.47%	586	591.61	593.31	638.97	643.77	644.25	644.57	671.49	
UUP	William McCullough	3.03%	238	343.93	349.54	395.17	420.37	429.41	430.41		
NI Conservatives	Colette Jones	2.65%	208	217.9	220.45						
Electorate: 14,012 Valid: 7,842 (55.97%) Spoilt: 173 Quota: 981 Turnout: 8,015 (57.20%)

== 1989 election ==
1985: 4 x UUP, 2 x DUP, 1 x SDLP

1989: 4 x UUP, 2 x DUP, 1 x SDLP

1985-1989 change: No change

Lurgan - 7 seats
Party	Candidate	FPv%	Count				
Party	Candidate	FPv%	1	2	3	4	5
UUP	Sydney Cairns*	23.04%	1,942				
UUP	Audrey Savage	18.56%	1,565				
UUP	Samuel Lutton	9.15%	771	1,127.5			
UUP	Meta Crozier	5.84%	492	886.22	1,236.68		
DUP	Ruth Allen	10.57%	891	924.12	979.56	1,077.31	
SDLP	Brid Rodgers*	12.34%	1,040	1,040	1,040.33	1,041.02	1,249.02
DUP	Yvonne Calvert	9.54%	804	884.5	864.69	1,029.32	1,033.21
Alliance	Gordon Burrell	6.61%	557	572.64	586.17	604.34	623.67
Sinn Féin	Patricia McKee	3.32%	280	280	280.66	280.89	
Workers' Party	Maureen McKeever	1.04%	88	88	88.99	89.45	
Electorate: 13,861 Valid: 8,430 (60.82%) Spoilt: 194 Quota: 1,054 Turnout: 8,624 (62.22%)

== 1985 election ==
1985: 4 x UUP, 2 x DUP, 1 x SDLP

Lurgan - 7 seats
Party	Candidate	FPv%	Count					
Party	Candidate	FPv%	1	2	3	4	5	6
UUP	Samuel Gardiner*	20.04%	1,690					
DUP	Frederick Baird*	15.68%	1,322					
UUP	George Savage*	12.69%	1,070					
UUP	Philip Black*	10.50%	885	1,189.51				
UUP	Sydney Cairns*	4.80%	405	621.45	656.45	766.85	1,019.52	
SDLP	Hugh News*	9.58%	808	808.37	808.97	808.97	887.17	1,234.17
DUP	David Calvert*	8.98%	757	806.58	954.98	964.58	990.47	992.63
DUP	Ian Williams*	5.93%	500	528.86	596.26	601.06	641.34	641.34
Sinn Féin	Patrick Little	6.80%	573	573	573	573.16	575.16	
Alliance	Gordon Burrell	5.00%	422	443.83	452.03	454.43		
Electorate: 13,157 Valid: 8,432 (64.09%) Spoilt: 147 Quota: 1,055 Turnout: 8,579 (65.20%)
