= Craigavon Area C =

District electoral areas in Craigavon, Northern Ireland

Craigavon Area C was one of the four district electoral areas in Craigavon, Northern Ireland which existed from 1973 to 1985. The district elected six members to Craigavon Borough Council, and formed part of the Armagh constituencies for the Northern Ireland Assembly and UK Parliament.

It was created for the 1973 local elections, and contained the wards of Bachelors Walk, Brownlow, Court, Killycomain, Keenan and Taghnevan. It was abolished for the 1985 local elections and mainly replaced by the Craigavon Central DEA.

== Councillors ==
Election	Councillor (Party)	Councillor (Party)	Councillor (Party)	Councillor (Party)	Councillor (Party)	Councillor (Party)
1981	Cyril McLoughlin (UUP)	Mary Simpson (UUP)	William Smith (DUP)	Robert Dodds (DUP)	Hugh News (SDLP)	Tom French (Republican Clubs)
1977	Frank Dale (UUP)	Mary Simpson (UUP)	Ronald Williamson (DUP)	Robert McEvoy (SDLP)	Hugh News (SDLP)	Brian English (Alliance)
1973	Frank Dale (UUP)	J. A. Johnston (UUP)	H. McCourt (UUP)	Frederick Crowe (Vanguard)	Hugh News (SDLP)	Brian English (Alliance)

== 1981 Election ==
1977: 2 x UUP, 2 x SDLP, 1 x Alliance, 1 x DUP

1981: 2 x UUP, 2 x DUP, 1 x SDLP, 1 x Republican Clubs

1977-1981 Change: DUP and Republican Clubs gain from SDLP and Alliance

Craigavon Area C - 6 seats
Party	Candidate	FPv%	Count												
Party	Candidate	FPv%	1	2	3	4	5	6	7	8	9	10	11	12	13
Republican Clubs	Tom French	14.19%	1,298	1,301	1,363										
SDLP	Hugh News*	11.77%	1,077	1,077	1,133	1,153.93	1,169.84	1,285.39	1,384.39						
UUP	Mary Simpson*	10.79%	987	1,015	1,015	1,015	1,015	1,015	1,132	1,134	1,194	1,200	1,552		
UUP	Cyril McLoughlin	8.47%	775	793	796	796	797	799	886	888	922	929	1,294	1,509.67	
DUP	William Smith	7.10%	650	662	662	662.91	663.91	663.91	671.91	672.91	1,053.91	1,054.91	1,074.91	1,089.92	1,150.75
DUP	Robert Dodds	8.20%	750	777	777	777.91	777.91	777.91	782.91	783.91	925.91	926.91	942.91	953.97	993.47
SDLP	Catherine McCann	4.27%	391	391	435	448.65	468.56	636.29	708.2	763.2	763.2	973.75	973.75	975.33	977.7
UUP	Jack Mathers	7.20%	659	670	670	670	670	670	759	760	774	782			
Independent Socialist	Alan Evans	4.35%	398	402	415	417.73	668.46	684.46	751.46	757.46	757.46				
DUP	Ronald Williamson*	6.74%	617	631	631	631	631	631	638	638					
Alliance	Brian Gee	6.33%	579	596	609	611.73	616.73	628.73							
SDLP	Terence McGinnity	2.95%	270	270	313	321.19	327.19								
Independent Socialist	George Forker	3.37%	308	309	313	317.55									
Ind. Nationalist	Robert McEvoy*	2.73%	250	252											
Ind. Unionist	Frederick Crowe	1.54%	141												
Electorate: 14,371 Valid: 9,150 (63.67%) Spoilt: 318 Quota: 1,308 Turnout: 9,468 (65.88%)

== 1977 Election ==
1973: 3 x UUP, 1 x SDLP, 1 x Alliance, 1 x Vanguard

1977: 2 x UUP, 2 x SDLP, 1 x Alliance, 1 x DUP

1973-1977 Change: SDLP and DUP gain from UUP and Vanguard

Craigavon Area C - 6 seats
Party	Candidate	FPv%	Count											
Party	Candidate	FPv%	1	2	3	4	5	6	7	8	9	10	11	12
SDLP	Hugh News*	15.90%	1,194											
SDLP	Robert McEvoy	8.99%	675	735.5	741.2	790	790	792	807.5	817.1	1,082.9			
UUP	Frank Dale*	11.37%	854	854	854	854	870	966	966	974	974	1,088		
DUP	Ronald Williamson	9.67%	726	726	726	726	741	747	747	748	748	798	832	1,175
UUP	Mary Simpson	7.07%	531	531	538	538	539.1	634.1	634.1	634.1	634.1	719.1	946.1	1,069.1
Alliance	Brian English	6.01%	451	453.6	519.7	530.8	534.8	543.8	543.8	773.1	787.3	802.3	965.5	974.5
Republican Clubs	Patrick O'Malley	6.02%	452	464.3	465.5	490.1	490.1	490.1	738	746.4	796	796	796	798
UUUP	William Cooper	5.10%	383	383	385	387	512	518	518	521	521	563	592	
Unionist Party NI	Florence Woodman	5.67%	426	426.3	438.3	438.3	445.3	454.3	454.3	456.4	456.4	491.4		
Vanguard	Frederick Crowe*	4.45%	334	334	336	336	355	358	358	360	360			
SDLP	Virginia King	3.58%	269	300.2	301.3	336.9	336.9	336.9	341.6	357				
Alliance	William Blanton	3.26%	245	246.5	263.6	281.2	287.2	290.2	293.2					
Republican Clubs	Roger Monteith	3.44%	258	260.2	260.4	280.8	281.8	282.8						
UUP	James Glenn	3.01%	226	226	227	228	235							
UUUP	Robert Anderson	2.69%	202	202.1	203.1	203.1								
Independent	Hugh Casey	2.22%	167	172.2	172.3									
Alliance	Michael Stevenson	1.56%	117	118.5										
Electorate: 13,624 Valid: 7,510 (55.12%) Spoilt: 325 Quota: 1,073 Turnout: 7,835 (57.51%)

== 1973 Election ==
1973: 3 x UUP, 1 x SDLP, 1 x Alliance, 1 x Vanguard

Craigavon Area C - 6 seats
Party	Candidate	FPv%	Count											
Party	Candidate	FPv%	1	2	3	4	5	6	7	8	9	10	11	12
Vanguard	Frederick Crowe	18.85%	1,385											
SDLP	Hugh News	10.27%	771	771	788	789	841	841	874	874	1,046.24	1,085.24		
Alliance	Brian English	7.74%	581	583.64	584.64	625.64	648.64	630.6	696.6	705.84	728.84	741.84	1,096.84	
UUP	J. A. Johnston	11.29%	848	879.44	879.44	883.44	883.44	888.88	892.88	984	984.24	986.24	1,003.96	1,076.96
UUP	H. McCourt	9.41%	707	736.52	736.52	737.52	737.52	746.68	746.68	831.28	831.28	832.28	838.52	984.88
UUP	Frank Dale	8.55%	642	707.04	707.04	711.04	711.04	718.4	718.4	781.84	783.08	783.08	795.32	977.96
Republican Clubs	P. Mallon	5.42%	407	407	410	412	484	484	496	496	520	813	831	831.24
DUP	H. W. Glass	3.41%	256	397.84	398.84	398.84	398.84	559.84	560.84	564.56	565.8	565.8	570.8	
Alliance	M. Qvam	3.25%	244	244.48	244.48	313.72	313.72	314.96	419.96	421.44	428.44	431.44		
Republican Clubs	T. E. Bell	4.10%	308	308	310	312	335	335	346	346	369			
SDLP	M. J. Duggan	2.73%	205	205.96	245.96	248.96	256.96	256.96	269.96	269.96				
UUP	Jack Mathers	3.20%	240	249.12	249.12	251.12	251.12	256.08	256.08					
Alliance	L. McParland	2.80%	210	210	215	243	251	251						
DUP	W. H. Percy	1.94%	146	192.8	192.8	192.8	192.8							
Ind. Republican	P. J. McNally	2.14%	161	161	167	169								
Alliance	J. M. Smythe	2.10%	158	158.24	160.24									
SDLP	J. J. Durkin	1.04%	78	78										
Electorate: 13,624 Valid: 7,510 (55.12%) Spoilt: 325 Quota: 1,073 Turnout: 7,835 (57.51%)
