= 2011 Craigavon Borough Council election =

Local government election in Northern Ireland

← 2005	5 May 2011	2014 →

All 26 seats to Craigavon Borough Council 14 seats needed for a majority
	First party	Second party	Third party
Party	DUP	Sinn Féin	UUP
Seats won	9	8	6
Seat change	0	▲2	0
	Fourth party	Fifth party	Sixth party
Party	SDLP	Alliance	Independent
Seats won	2	1	0
Seat change	▼2	▲1	▼1
- Party with the most votes by district.

Elections to Craigavon Borough Council were held on 5 May 2011 on the same day as the other Northern Irish local government elections. The election used four district electoral areas to elect a total of 26 councillors.

== Election results ==
Craigavon Borough Council Election Result 2011
Party	Seats	Gains	Losses	Net gain/loss	Seats %	Votes %	Votes	+/−
DUP	9	1	1	0	34.6	30.0	9,974	▼0.8
Sinn Féin	8	2	0	▲2	30.8	27.9	9,304	▲5.5
UUP	6	0	0	0	23.1	20.6	6,845	▼2.2
SDLP	2	0	2	▼2	7.7	12.1	4,026	▼4.8
Alliance	1	1	0	▲1	3.8	3.4	1,137	▲1.0
TUV	0	0	0	0	0.0	2.9	976	New
Independent	0	0	1	▼1	0.0	2.8	917	▼1.4
UKIP	0	0	0	0	0.0	0.4	122	New

Note: "Votes" are the first preference votes.

== Districts summary ==
Results of the Craigavon Borough Council election, 2011 by district
Ward	%	Cllrs	%	Cllrs	%	Cllrs	%	Cllrs	%	Cllrs	%	Cllrs	Total Cllrs
Ward	DUP		Sinn Féin		UUP		SDLP		Alliance		Others		Total Cllrs
Central	28.8	2	24.7	2	24.7	2	4.4	0	6.7	1	10.7	0	7
Loughside	6.5	0	60.0	3	0.0	0	30.5	2	0.0	0	3.0	0	5
Lurgan	37.4	3	9.8	1	35.3	3	5.4	0	5.6	0	6.5	0	7
Portadown	46.2	4	22.6	2	17.1	1	11.1	0	0.0	0	3.0	0	7
Total	30.0	9	27.9	8	20.6	6	12.1	2	3.4	1	6.0	0	26

== District results ==
=== Central ===
2005: 3 x DUP, 2 x UUP, 1 x Sinn Féin, 1 x SDLP
2011: 2 x DUP, 2 x UUP, 2 x Sinn Féin, 1 x Alliance
2005-2011 Change: Sinn Féin and Alliance gain from SDLP and DUP

Central - 7 seats
Party	Candidate	FPv%	Count										
Party	Candidate	FPv%	1	2	3	4	5	6	7	8	9	10	11
Sinn Féin	Mark O'Dowd	16.28%	1,434										
DUP	Robert Smith*	15.95%	1,405										
UUP	Kenneth Twyble*	12.54%	1,104										
Sinn Féin	Tommy O'Connor	8.45%	744	1,025.52	1,025.73	1,038.61	1,038.61	1,123.61					
DUP	William Smith*	7.81%	688	688.24	952.21	953.21	1,053.04	1,057.05	1,057.67	1,455.67			
UUP	Ronald Harkness*	6.97%	614	614.48	619.52	620.52	675.52	679.52	679.52	710.34	862.34	1,266.34	
Alliance	Michael Dixon	6.66%	586	587.68	588.31	591.55	596.79	676.67	687.83	698.7	706.7	769.82	900.82
Independent	Kieran Corr*	7.86%	692	717.2	717.62	731.58	737.58	837.62	847.54	851.96	856.96	872.41	879.41
UUP	Andrew Crockett	5.21%	459	459.48	461.58	462.58	496	498	498.62	511.56	596.56		
DUP	Louise Templeton	5.04%	444	444	462.69	462.93	476.14	477.14	477.14				
SDLP	Mary Elliott	3.16%	278	287.12	287.33	355.49	355.73						
TUV	Roy Ferguson	2.85%	251	251.24	253.13	254.37							
SDLP	Anna Ochal-Molenda	1.23%	108	115.44	115.44								
Electorate: 16,864 Valid: 8,807 (52.22%) Spoilt: 277 Quota: 1,101 Turnout: 9,084 (53.87%)

=== Loughside ===
2005: 3 x Sinn Féin, 2 x SDLP
2011: 3 x Sinn Féin, 2 x SDLP
2005-2011 Change: No change

Loughside - 5 seats
Party	Candidate	FPv%	Count					
Party	Candidate	FPv%	1	2	3	4	5	6
Sinn Féin	Johnny McGibbon	32.38%	2,465					
Sinn Féin	Mairéad O'Dowd*	10.67%	812	1,477.42				
SDLP	Declan McAlinden	13.99%	1,065	1,117.43	1,151.43	1,176.63	1,286.63	
SDLP	Joe Nelson	8.82%	671	701.87	776.77	787.21	831.88	1,282.88
Sinn Féin	Noel McGeown	9.66%	735	978.53	1,007.98	1,107.34	1,108.34	1,157.81
Sinn Féin	Maurice Magill	7.26%	553	712.25	724.25	781.49	785.85	862.91
SDLP	Caoimhe Dummigan	7.74%	589	619.87	643.87	657.01	729.01	
DUP	Philip Carson	6.53%	497	497.49	517.49	518.03		
Independent	Mal Nelson	2.96%	225	235.78				
Electorate: 13,346 Valid: 7,612 (57.04%) Spoilt: 201 Quota: 1,269 Turnout: 7,813 (58.54%)

=== Lurgan ===
2005: 3 x DUP, 3 x UUP, 1 x Sinn Féin
2011: 3 x DUP, 3 x UUP, 1 x Sinn Féin
2005-2011 Change: No change

Lurgan - 7 seats
Party	Candidate	FPv%	Count						
Party	Candidate	FPv%	1	2	3	4	5	6	7
DUP	Stephen Moutray*	19.95%	1,952						
UUP	Jo-Anne Dobson	13.40%	1,311						
UUP	Meta Crozier*	12.66%	1,239						
DUP	Carla Lockhart	9.73%	952	1,237					
Sinn Féin	Liam Mackle	9.81%	960	961.14	962.14	962.21	962.22	1,224.3	
UUP	George Savage*	9.25%	905	1,002.28	1,027.66	1,088.56	1,098.14	1,102.43	1,353.43
DUP	Mark Baxter	7.74%	757	1,047.7	1,066.6	1,078.5	1,079.37	1,089.89	1,204.89
Alliance	John Cleland	5.63%	551	557.08	583.46	588.85	589.29	727.86	747.86
TUV	David Calvert	5.19%	508	533.46	559.98	563.62	564.11	564.11	
SDLP	Pat McDade	5.41%	529	532.42	534.8	536.13	536.18		
UUP	Barbara Trotter	1.25%	122	128.46					
Electorate: 17,168 Valid: 9,786 (57.00%) Spoilt: 185 Quota: 1,224 Turnout: 9,971 (58.08%)

=== Portadown ===
2005: 3 x DUP, 1 x Sinn Féin, 1 x UUP, 1 x SDLP, 1 x Independent
2011: 4 x DUP, 2 x Sinn Féin, 1 x UUP
2005-2011 Change: DUP and Sinn Féin gain from SDLP and Independent

Portadown - 7 seats
Party	Candidate	FPv%	Count								
Party	Candidate	FPv%	1	2	3	4	5	6	7	8	9
DUP	Sydney Anderson*	28.59%	2,029								
DUP	Alan Carson*	4.90%	348	1,056.4							
UUP	Arnold Hatch*	12.44%	883	966.44							
DUP	Gladys McCullough	9.37%	665	872.76	915.14						
Sinn Féin	Paul Duffy	11.39%	808	809.12	809.38	809.38	816.38	817.38	858.38	858.47	859.47
Sinn Féin	Gemma McKenna	11.18%	793	793.56	793.56	793.56	801.56	802.12	823.12	823.12	823.12
DUP	Darren Causby	3.34%	237	299.72	412.17	426.73	428.73	512.64	514.77	534.21	806.9
SDLP	John McGoldrick	5.13%	364	366.24	366.37	366.37	402.93	405.62	554.31	554.4	571.4
UUP	Robert Oliver	4.65%	330	351.84	356.39	400.63	407.19	493.87	497	501.86	
SDLP	Mary McAlinden*	3.64%	258	259.12	259.38	259.38	342.07	345.63			
TUV	Karen Boal	3.06%	217	246.68	248.37	252.85	252.85				
SDLP	Daniel Gouveia	2.31%	164	166.24	166.37	166.93					
Electorate: 13,650 Valid: 7,096 (51.99%) Spoilt: 174 Quota: 888 Turnout: 7,270 (53.26%)
