= Tom French (Northern Ireland politician) =

Northern Irish politician (born 1934)

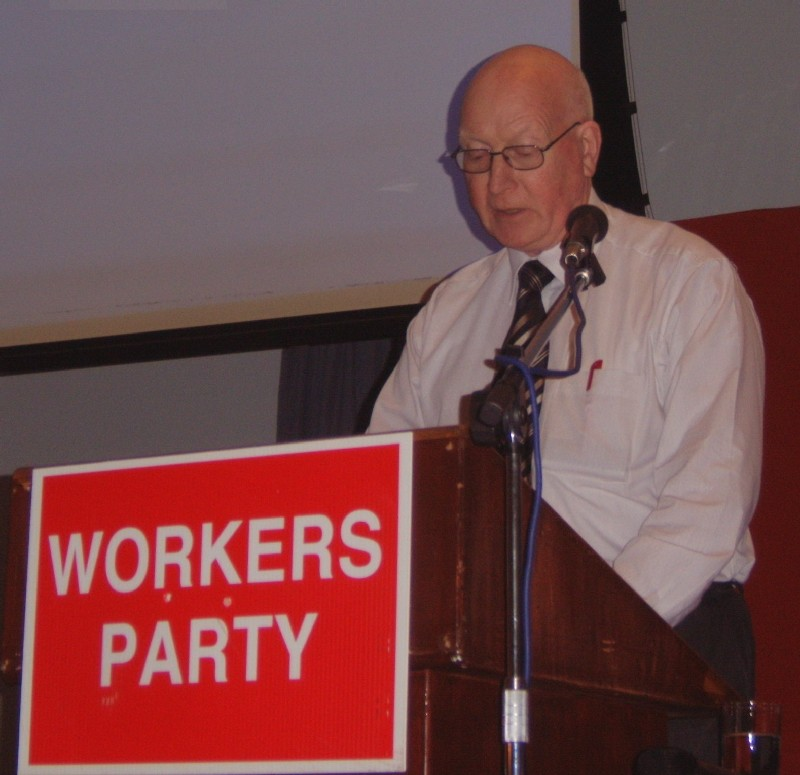

President of the Workers' Party
- In office 1996–2000
- Preceded by: Marian Donnelly
- Succeeded by: Seán Garland

Member of Craigavon Borough Council
- In office 17 May 1989 – 19 May 1993
- Preceded by: Padraig Breen
- Succeeded by: Peter Smyth
- Constituency: Loughside
- In office 15 May 1985 – 17 May 1989
- Preceded by: District created
- Succeeded by: Sean Hagan
- Constituency: Craigavon Central
- In office 1978 – 15 May 1985
- Preceded by: Malachy McGurran
- Succeeded by: District abolished
- Constituency: Craigavon Area C

Personal details
- Born: 1934 Belfast, Northern Ireland
- Died: 12 March 2023 (aged 88) Lurgan, County Armagh, Northern Ireland
- Party: Workers' Party (from 1970)
- Other political affiliations: Sinn Féin (until 1970)
- Spouse: Frances French

Tom French (1934 – 12 March 2023) was a Northern Irish politician who served as president of the Workers' Party from 1994 to 2000, as well as a Craigavon Borough Councillor from 1978 until the 1993 local elections.

Born in Belfast in 1934, French joined Sinn Féin as a youth and remained with the party as it evolved into the Workers' Party.

== Early life ==
After attending teacher training college, he became a schoolteacher in Lurgan, County Armagh. He was an early recruit to the Northern Ireland Civil Rights Association and participated in many of its civil rights marches throughout Northern Ireland in the late 1960s. When Sinn Féin split in 1970, French supported the Official wing and was a member of its first Publicity Committee. Much later, he became a founding member of the Peace Train Organisation, which was formed to oppose the Provisional IRA's bombing of the Dublin to Belfast railway line.

== Political career ==
French worked closely beside Malachy McGurran who was a major figure in the northern republican movement from the late 1950s and a Vice-President of Official Sinn Féin. He was heavily involved in McGurran's various election campaigns and when McGurran died in 1978, French won the local by-election to fill his seat on Craigavon Borough Council. He remained a councillor, alternating between representing the Loughside and Craigavon Central areas, until 1993 when he lost his seat. He also unsuccessfully contested Armagh in the 1982 Assembly election and subsequent 1983 by-election and contested one of its successor constituencies, Upper Bann at every election from its creation in 1983 until 2005. His best result was the 19% which he polled in the 1986 by-election where he was the only candidate opposing the sitting MP. In 1996 he was an unsuccessful candidate in the Northern Ireland Forum election in Upper Bann.

He was a member of the Ard Comhairle / Central Executive Committee of the Workers' Party for many years. In 1992, he was elected Chairman of the Workers' Party in the North and in 1996 was elected to the position of Party President, replacing Marian Donnelly. He retired from that position in 2000 and was replaced by Seán Garland. He stepped down from the Ard Comhairle some years later.

== Personal life ==
He was married to Frances French, and they had five children together.

He was an opera singer, poet, and writer. He was a member of the Lough Neagh Writers' Group.

He died after a long battle with Parkinson's disease on 12 March 2023.

Party political offices
Preceded by Marian Donnelly	President of the Workers' Party; 1996–2000	Succeeded by Seán Garland
