= Sam Gardiner =

British politician (1940–2022)

Sam Gardiner MBE, JP
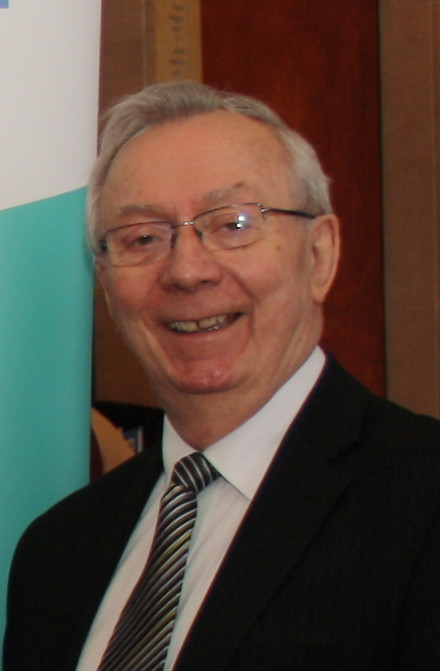

Father of the Northern Ireland Assembly
- In office 5 May 2011 – 5 May 2016

Member of the Northern Ireland Assembly for Upper Bann
- In office 26 November 2003 – 30 March 2016
- Preceded by: George Savage
- Succeeded by: Doug Beattie

Mayor of Craigavon
- In office 2001–2002
- Preceded by: Fred Crowe
- Succeeded by: Jonathan Bell
- In office 1988–1989
- Preceded by: Sydney Cairns
- Succeeded by: James McCammick
- In office 1982–1983
- Preceded by: Mary Simpson
- Succeeded by: James Gillespie

Member of Craigavon Borough Council
- In office 21 May 1997 – 5 May 2011
- Preceded by: Audrey Savage
- Succeeded by: Jo-Anne Dobson
- Constituency: Lurgan
- In office 15 May 1985 – 17 May 1989
- Preceded by: District created
- Succeeded by: Audrey Savage
- Constituency: Lurgan
- In office 20 May 1981 – 15 May 1985
- Preceded by: James Baird
- Succeeded by: District abolished
- Constituency: Craigavon Area D

Ulster Unionist Whip in the Northern Ireland Forum
- In office 1996–1998
- Leader: David Trimble
- Preceded by: Office created
- Succeeded by: Office abolished

Northern Ireland Forum Member for Upper Bann
- In office 30 May 1996 – 25 April 1998
- Preceded by: New forum
- Succeeded by: Forum dissolved

Mayor of Lurgan
- In office 1968–1969

Member of Lurgan Borough Council
- In office 1963–1973
- Succeeded by: Council abolished

Personal details
- Born: 24 March 1940 Lurgan, County Armagh, Northern Ireland
- Died: 8 November 2022 (aged 82)
- Party: Ulster Unionist Party
- Spouse: Elizabeth Gardiner
- Children: Clive; Keith
- Website: Gardiner UUP

Alderman Samuel Gardiner MBE JP (24 March 1940 – 8 November 2022) was a Northern Irish Ulster Unionist Party (UUP) politician who was a Member of the Northern Ireland Assembly (MLA) for Upper Bann from 2003 to 2016.

== Background ==
Gardiner was elected to Lurgan Borough Council (now Craigavon Borough Council) in 1963 and held office of mayor in that borough in 1968. He was mayor of Craigavon 1982/3, 1988/9 and 2000/1.

Gardiner was elected to the Northern Ireland Forum and was party whip in the same in 1996–1998.

Gardiner was elected to the Assembly in 2003. He served on the Environmental, Leisure Services and Public Services Liaison Committees and was the UUP spokesperson on environment. As the oldest Northern Ireland Assembly member, Gardiner also served as Father of the House, a role which includes presiding over the election of a new Speaker of the Assembly.

Gardiner was a High Sheriff for County Armagh and was appointed a justice of the peace. He was also a member of the Orange Order, Deputy Sovereign Grand Master of the Royal Black Institution and former chairman of Glenavon F.C.

Gardiner died on 8 November 2022, at the age of 82.

Civic offices
Unknown	Mayor of Lurgan; 1968–1969	Unknown
Preceded by Mary Simpson	Mayor of Craigavon; 1982–1983	Succeeded by James Gillespie
Preceded by Sydney Cairns	Mayor of Craigavon; 1988–1989	Succeeded by James McCammick
Preceded by Fred Crowe	Mayor of Craigavon; 2001–2002	Succeeded by Jonathan Bell
Northern Ireland Forum
New forum	Member for Upper Bann; 1996–1998	Forum dissolved
Northern Ireland Assembly
Preceded by George Savage	MLA for Upper Bann; 2003–2016	Succeeded by Doug Beattie
