= Upper Bann (UK Parliament constituency) =

UK Parliament constituency (since 1983)

Coordinates: 54°25′18″N 6°23′46″W

- County constituency for the House of Commons
- Boundary of Upper Bann in Northern Ireland
- District: Armagh, Banbridge and Craigavon
- Electorate: 77,905 (March 2011)
- Major settlements: Lurgan, Portadown

Current constituency
- Created: 1983
- Member of Parliament: Carla Lockhart (Independent)
- Seats: 1
- Created from: Armagh; South Down

Upper Bann is a parliamentary constituency in Northern Ireland, which is represented in the United Kingdom House of Commons. The current MP is Carla Lockhart, who was elected for the Democratic Unionist Party and became an independent in November 2026.

Map of current boundaries

== History ==
The constituency has a unionist majority, with the combined votes for nationalist parties reaching around 35% in elections. The Ulster Unionist Party has traditionally been dominant though it has been supplanted by the Democratic Unionist Party in recent years. The constituency contains Portadown and Drumcree, key locations for the Orange Order and elections to both local councils and the Northern Ireland Assembly have seen independent candidates standing on issues related to Orange Order parades performing well.

In 1990 the sitting MP, Harold McCusker, died and the subsequent by-election was notable as for the first time since the early 1970s two UK-wide political parties stood in a Northern Ireland parliamentary election, the Conservatives and the rump of the Social Democratic Party. However the result was disappointing for the Conservatives, whilst the SDP polled a mere 154 votes. In that by-election David Trimble was elected and five years later he became leader of the Ulster Unionist Party. Trimble's leadership came in for much criticism from the rival Democratic Unionist Party and they strongly targeted the area.

In the 2001 general election there was a strong rumour that the DUP leader Ian Paisley would contest the seat himself, in the hope of unseating Trimble, but in the event he stayed in his North Antrim constituency and the DUP instead nominated David Simpson. The campaign was amongst the most bitter in the entire province, with Trimble coming in for fierce personal attacks. He benefitted, however, from the decision of the Alliance Party of Northern Ireland not to contest the seat themselves but instead support him and the UUP. When the results were counted Simpson was initially ahead and many believed he had won, but Trimble pulled ahead to hold the seat on a narrow majority of 2058.

In the subsequent 2003 assembly election the DUP were only 386 votes behind the UUP. Then in the 2005 general election Trimble was defeated by Simpson. Simpson retained his seat in the 2010 general election, while the UUP vote remained fairly static. The nationalist vote had continued to grow until the 2019 general election, which could have made this seat a possible battleground between nationalists and unionists.

== Boundaries ==
The seat was created in boundary changes in 1983, as part of an expansion of Northern Ireland's constituencies from 12 to 17, and was predominantly made up from parts of Armagh and South Down.

| 1983–1997 | The district of Craigavon; and in the district of Banbridge, the wards of Ballydown, Central, Edenderry, Gilford, Laurencetown, Loughbrickland, and Seapatrick. |
| 1997–2024 | The district of Craigavon; and in the district of Banbridge, the wards of Ballydown, Banbridge West, Edenderry, Fort, Gilford, Lawrencetown, Loughbrickland, Seapatrick, and The Cut. |
| 2024– | In Armagh City, Banbridge and Craigavon, the wards of Ballybay, the part of the Banbridge East ward to the west of the eastern boundary of the 1997–2024 Upper Bann constituency, Banbridge North, Banbridge South, Banbridge West, Bleary, Brownlow, Corcrain, Craigavon Centre, Derrytrasna, the part of the Donaghcloney ward to the west of the western boundary of the 1997–2024 Lagan Valley constituency, Gilford, Kernan, Killycomain, Knocknashane, Lough Road, the part of the Loughgall ward to the south of the northern boundary of the 1997–2024 Newry and Armagh constituency, Mahon, Mourneview, Parklake, Shankill, the part of The Birches ward to the east of the western boundary of the 1997–2024 Upper Bann constituency, and the Waringstown. |

== Members of Parliament ==
David Trimble served as leader of the Ulster Unionist Party following a 1995 leadership election. He resigned as leader shortly after his defeat at the 2005 general election.

Carla Lockhart was a member of the Democratic Unionist Party until she resigned from the party in protest at their stance in the Drumcree dispute.

| Election | MP | Party |
|---|---|---|
| 1983 | Harold McCusker | UUP |
| 1986 b | Harold McCusker | UUP |
| 1987 | Harold McCusker | UUP |
| 1990 b | David Trimble | UUP |
| 1992 | David Trimble | UUP |
| 1997 | David Trimble | UUP |
| 2001 | David Trimble | UUP |
| 2005 | David Simpson | DUP |
| 2010 | David Simpson | DUP |
| 2015 | David Simpson | DUP |
| 2017 | David Simpson | DUP |
| 2019 | Carla Lockhart | DUP |
| 2024 | Carla Lockhart | DUP |
| 2026 | Carla Lockhart | Independent |

== Elections ==
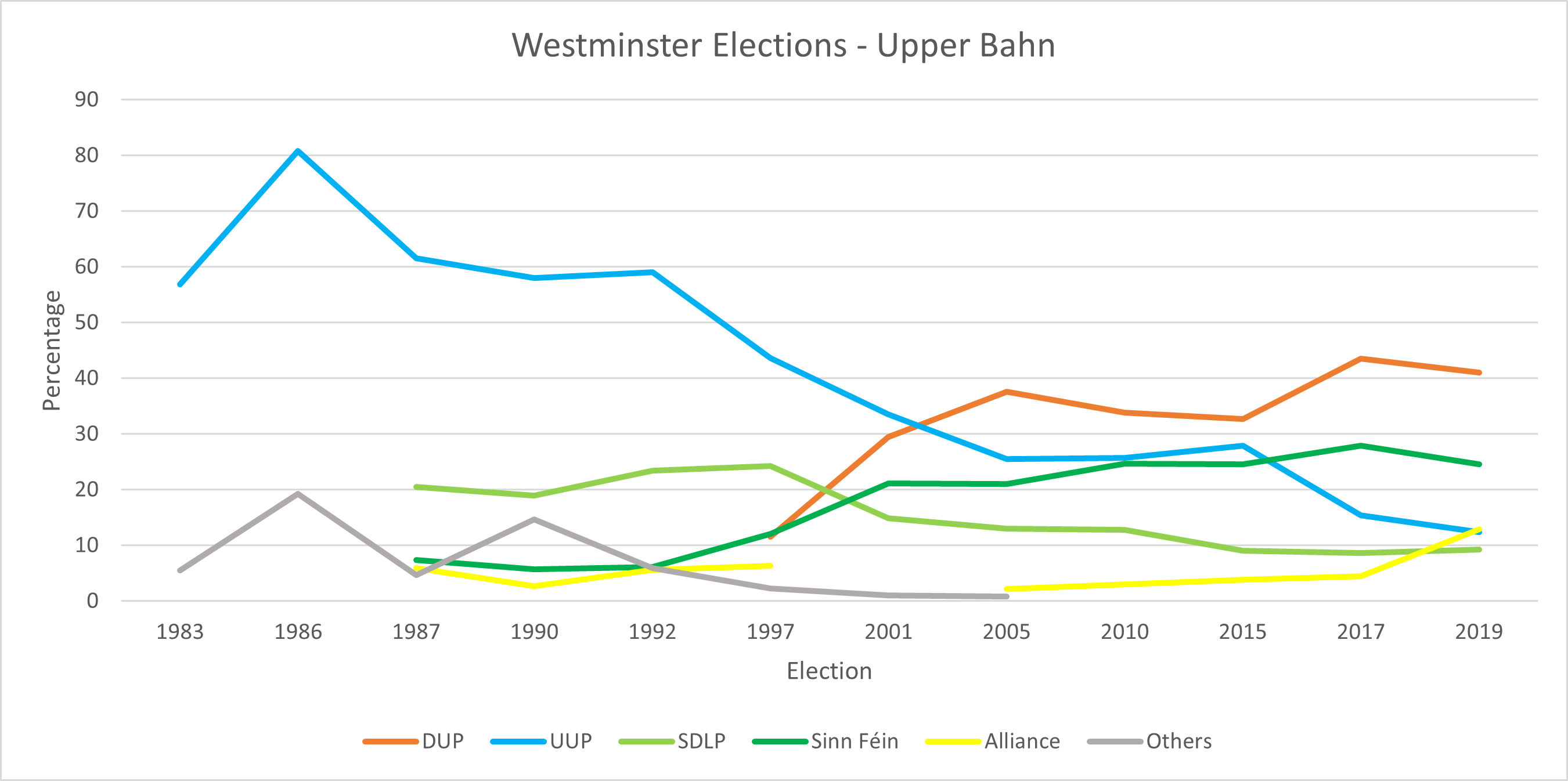
Upper Bann

=== Elections in the 2020s ===
2024 general election: Upper Bann
| Party | Candidate | Votes | % | ±% |
|---|---|---|---|---|
| DUP | Carla Lockhart | 21,642 | 45.7 | +4.9 |
| Sinn Féin | Catherine Nelson | 14,236 | 30.1 | +5.4 |
| Alliance | Eóin Tennyson | 6,322 | 13.3 | +0.6 |
| UUP | Kate Evans | 3,662 | 7.7 | −4.8 |
| SDLP | Malachy Quinn | 1,496 | 3.2 | −6.2 |
| Majority | | 7,406 | 15.6 | −0.8 |
| Turnout | | 47,358 | 58.3 | −2.1 |
| Registered electors | | 81,249 | | |
| DUP hold | | Swing | −0.2 | |

=== Elections in the 2010s ===
2019 general election: Upper Bann
| Party | Candidate | Votes | % | ±% |
|---|---|---|---|---|
| DUP | Carla Lockhart | 20,501 | 41.0 | −2.5 |
| Sinn Féin | John O'Dowd | 12,291 | 24.6 | −3.3 |
| Alliance | Eóin Tennyson | 6,433 | 12.9 | +8.4 |
| UUP | Doug Beattie | 6,197 | 12.4 | −3.0 |
| SDLP | Dolores Kelly | 4,623 | 9.2 | +0.6 |
| Majority | | 8,210 | 16.4 | +0.8 |
| Turnout | | 50,045 | 60.4 | −3.5 |
| Registered electors | | 82,856 | | |
| DUP hold | | Swing | +0.5 | |

2017 general election: Upper Bann
| Party | Candidate | Votes | % | ±% |
|---|---|---|---|---|
| DUP | David Simpson | 22,317 | 43.5 | +10.8 |
| Sinn Féin | John O'Dowd | 14,325 | 27.9 | +3.3 |
| UUP | Doug Beattie | 7,900 | 15.4 | −12.5 |
| SDLP | Declan McAlinden | 4,397 | 8.6 | −0.4 |
| Alliance | Tara Doyle | 2,319 | 4.5 | +0.7 |
| Majority | | 7,992 | 15.6 | +11.8 |
| Turnout | | 51,258 | 63.9 | +4.9 |
| Registered electors | | 80,168 | | |
| DUP hold | | Swing | +3.7 | |

2015 general election: Upper Bann
| Party | Candidate | Votes | % | ±% |
|---|---|---|---|---|
| DUP | David Simpson | 15,430 | 32.7 | −1.1 |
| UUP | Jo-Anne Dobson | 13,166 | 27.9 | +2.2 |
| Sinn Féin | Catherine Seeley | 11,593 | 24.6 | −0.1 |
| SDLP | Dolores Kelly | 4,238 | 9.0 | −3.8 |
| Alliance | Peter Lavery | 1,780 | 3.8 | +0.8 |
| CISTA | Martin Kelly | 460 | 1.0 | New |
| Workers' Party | Damien Harte | 351 | 0.7 | New |
| NI Conservatives | Amandeep Singh Bhogal | 201 | 0.4 | New |
| Majority | | 2,264 | 4.8 | −3.3 |
| Turnout | | 47,219 | 59.0 | +3.7 |
| Registered electors | | 80,060 | | |
| DUP hold | | Swing | −1.7 | |

2010 general election: Upper Bann
| Party | Candidate | Votes | % | ±% |
|---|---|---|---|---|
| DUP | David Simpson | 14,000 | 33.8 | −3.8 |
| UCU-NF | Harry Hamilton | 10,639 | 25.7 | +0.2 |
| Sinn Féin | John O'Dowd | 10,237 | 24.7 | +3.7 |
| SDLP | Dolores Kelly | 5,276 | 12.8 | −0.2 |
| Alliance | Brendan Heading | 1,231 | 3.0 | +0.8 |
| Majority | | 3,361 | 8.1 | −4.0 |
| Turnout | | 41,383 | 55.3 | −5.9 |
| Registered electors | | 74,732 | | |
| DUP hold | | Swing | −1.9 | |

=== Elections in the 2000s ===
2005 general election: Upper Bann
| Party | Candidate | Votes | % | ±% |
|---|---|---|---|---|
| DUP | David Simpson | 16,679 | 37.6 | +8.1 |
| UUP | David Trimble | 11,281 | 25.5 | −8.0 |
| Sinn Féin | John O'Dowd | 9,305 | 21.0 | −0.1 |
| SDLP | Dolores Kelly | 5,747 | 13.0 | −1.9 |
| Alliance | Alan Castle | 955 | 2.2 | New |
| Workers' Party | Tom French | 355 | 0.8 | −0.2 |
| Majority | | 5,398 | 12.1 | N/A |
| Turnout | | 44,322 | 61.2 | −9.1 |
| Registered electors | | 71,645 | | |
| DUP gain from UUP | | Swing | +8.1 | |

2001 general election: Upper Bann
| Party | Candidate | Votes | % | ±% |
|---|---|---|---|---|
| UUP | David Trimble | 17,095 | 33.5 | −10.1 |
| DUP | David Simpson | 15,037 | 29.5 | +18.0 |
| Sinn Féin | Dara O'Hagan | 10,771 | 21.1 | +9.0 |
| SDLP | Dolores Kelly | 7,607 | 14.9 | −9.3 |
| Workers' Party | Tom French | 527 | 1.0 | −0.2 |
| Majority | | 2,058 | 4.0 | −15.4 |
| Turnout | | 51,037 | 70.3 | +2.5 |
| Registered electors | | 72,574 | | |
| UUP hold | | Swing | −14.1 | |

=== Elections in the 1990s ===
1997 general election: Upper Bann
| Party | Candidate | Votes | % | ±% |
|---|---|---|---|---|
| UUP | David Trimble | 20,836 | 43.6 | −15.4 |
| SDLP | Bríd Rodgers | 11,584 | 24.2 | +0.8 |
| Sinn Féin | Bernadette O'Hagan | 5,773 | 12.1 | +0.6 |
| DUP | Mervyn Carrick | 5,482 | 11.5 | New |
| Alliance | William Ramsay | 3,017 | 6.3 | +0.7 |
| Workers' Party | Tom French | 554 | 1.2 | −1.3 |
| NI Conservatives | Brian Price | 433 | 0.9 | −2.5 |
| Natural Law | Jack Lyons | 108 | 0.2 | New |
| Majority | | 9,252 | 19.4 | −16.2 |
| Turnout | | 47,787 | 67.8 | +0.4 |
| Registered electors | | 70,503 | | |
| UUP hold | | Swing | −8.1 | |

1992 general election: Upper Bann
| Party | Candidate | Votes | % | ±% |
|---|---|---|---|---|
| UUP | David Trimble | 26,824 | 59.0 | −2.5 |
| SDLP | Bríd Rodgers | 10,661 | 23.4 | +2.9 |
| Sinn Féin | Brendan Curran | 2,777 | 6.1 | −1.3 |
| Alliance | William Ramsay | 2,541 | 5.6 | −0.3 |
| NI Conservatives | Collette Jones | 1,556 | 3.4 | N/A |
| Workers' Party | Tom French | 1,120 | 2.5 | −2.2 |
| Majority | | 16,163 | 35.6 | −5.4 |
| Turnout | | 45,479 | 67.4 | +1.4 |
| Registered electors | | 67,446 | | |
| UUP hold | | Swing | | |

1990 Upper Bann by-election
| Party | Candidate | Votes | % | ±% |
|---|---|---|---|---|
| UUP | David Trimble | 20,547 | 58.0 | −3.5 |
| SDLP | Bríd Rodgers | 6,698 | 18.9 | −1.6 |
| Sinn Féin | Sheena Campbell | 2,033 | 5.7 | −1.7 |
| Ulster Independence | Hugh Ross | 1,534 | 4.3 | New |
| Workers' Party | Tom French | 1,083 | 3.1 | −1.6 |
| NI Conservatives | Colette Jones | 1,038 | 3.0 | New |
| Alliance | William Ramsay | 948 | 2.7 | −3.2 |
| Ulster Democratic | Gary McMichael | 600 | 1.7 | New |
| Green | Peter Doran | 576 | 1.6 | New |
| Independent Labour | Erskine Holmes | 235 | 0.6 | New |
| SDP | Alistair Dunn | 154 | 0.4 | New |
| Majority | | 13,849 | 39.1 | −1.9 |
| Turnout | | 35,446 | 53.4 | −12.6 |
| Registered electors | | 66,377 | | |
| UUP hold | | Swing | | |

=== Elections in the 1980s ===
1987 general election: Upper Bann
| Party | Candidate | Votes | % | ±% |
|---|---|---|---|---|
| UUP | Harold McCusker | 25,137 | 61.5 | +4.6 |
| SDLP | Bríd Rodgers | 8,676 | 20.5 | +3.6 |
| Sinn Féin | Brendan Curran | 3,126 | 7.4 | −2.0 |
| Alliance | Mary Cook | 2,487 | 5.9 | New |
| Workers' Party | Tom French | 2,004 | 4.7 | −0.8 |
| Majority | | 17,361 | 41.0 | ±0.0 |
| Turnout | | 41,430 | 66.0 | −6.0 |
| Registered electors | | 64,540 | | |
| UUP hold | | Swing | | |

1986 Upper Bann by-election
| Party | Candidate | Votes | % | ±% |
|---|---|---|---|---|
| UUP | Harold McCusker | 29,311 | 80.8 | +23.9 |
| Workers' Party | Tom French | 6,978 | 19.2 | +13.7 |
| Majority | | 22,333 | 61.6 | +20.6 |
| Turnout | | 36,861 | 57.2 | −14.8 |
| Registered electors | | 63,484 | | |
| UUP hold | | Swing | | |

1983 general election: Upper Bann
| Party | Candidate | Votes | % | ±% |
|---|---|---|---|---|
| UUP | Harold McCusker | 24,888 | 56.9 | |
| SDLP | James McDonald | 7,807 | 17.9 | |
| DUP | Jim Wells | 4,547 | 10.4 | |
| Sinn Féin | Brendan Curran | 4,110 | 9.4 | |
| Workers' Party | Tom French | 2,392 | 5.5 | |
| Majority | | 17,081 | 41.0 | |
| Turnout | | 41,644 | 72.0 | |
| Registered electors | | 60,734 | | |
| UUP win (new seat) | | | | |

== See also ==
- List of parliamentary constituencies in Northern Ireland
