= Hugh News =

Northern Irish politician (1931–2012)

Member of Craigavon Borough Council
- In office 15 May 1985 – 17 May 1989
- Preceded by: District created
- Succeeded by: Brid Rodgers
- Constituency: Lurgan
- In office 30 May 1973 – 15 May 1985
- Preceded by: Council established
- Succeeded by: District abolished
- Constituency: Craigavon Area C

Member of the Northern Ireland Assembly for Armagh
- In office 20 October 1982 – 1986
- Preceded by: Assembly re-established
- Succeeded by: Assembly dissolved
- In office 30 May 1973 – 1974
- Preceded by: Assembly established
- Succeeded by: Assembly abolished

Member of the Constitutional Convention for Armagh
- In office 1975–1976
- Preceded by: Convention created
- Succeeded by: Convention dissolved

Personal details
- Born: June 1931 County Armagh, Northern Ireland
- Died: April 2012 (aged 80)
- Party: Social Democratic and Labour

Hugh News (June 1931 – April 2012) was an Irish nationalist politician from Northern Ireland.

== Background ==
News grew up in Silverwood, Lurgan, and studied at St Colman's College, Newry, before working as a pharmacist and publican in Lurgan. In 1964, he was elected to Lurgan Borough Council, serving for three years as a member of the Independent Citizens' Association. News joined the Social Democratic and Labour Party (SDLP) in the early 1970s and was elected for the party to Craigavon Borough Council in 1973, holding his seat at each election until he stood down in 1989.

News was elected in Armagh at the 1973 Northern Ireland Assembly election and held his seat on the Northern Ireland Constitutional Convention in 1975 and at the 1982 Assembly election. In the last two elections, he narrowly beat fellow SDLP member and friend Paddy O'Hanlon for the final seat.

In October 1973, armed men, believed to be loyalist paramilitaries, threw a grenade at News' public house, the Criterion Bar in Francis Street, Lurgan, injuring a customer and a barman. News continued to run the pub until his retirement in 1998.

In his spare time, News also served as national vice-president of the Ancient Order of Hibernians in the 1970s.

News died in late April 2012.

Northern Ireland Assembly (1973)
New assembly	Assembly Member for Armagh; 1973–1974	Assembly abolished
Northern Ireland Constitutional Convention
New convention	Member for Armagh; 1975–1976	Convention dissolved
Northern Ireland Assembly (1982)
New assembly	MPA for Armagh; 1982–1986	Assembly abolished
