= Mary Simpson (Northern Ireland politician) =

Northern Irish politician (c.1932–2020)

Mayor of Craigavon
- In office 1981–1982
- Preceded by: Frank Dale
- Succeeded by: Sam Gardiner

Member of Craigavon Borough Council
- In office 15 May 1985 – 17 May 1989
- Preceded by: District created
- Succeeded by: Frederick Crowe
- Constituency: Craigavon Central
- In office 18 May 1977 – 15 May 1985
- Preceded by: J.A. Johnston
- Succeeded by: District abolished
- Constituency: Craigavon Area C

Member of the Northern Ireland Assembly for Armagh
- In office 20 October 1982 – 1986
- Preceded by: Assembly re-established
- Succeeded by: Assembly dissolved

Personal details
- Born: 1932; County Armagh, Northern Ireland
- Died: 22 November 2020
- Political party: Ulster Unionist Party

Mary Simpson (c.1932 – 22 November 2020) was a Northern Irish unionist politician.

== Political career ==
Simpson was honorary secretary of the Central Armagh Unionist Association from 1974 until 1983, and was elected to Craigavon Borough Council for the Ulster Unionist Party at the 1977 local elections. She held her seat in 1981, and served as Mayor of Craigavon in 1981/2, the first woman to hold the post.

At the 1982 Northern Ireland Assembly election, Simpson stood in Armagh. She took only 721 first-preference votes, leaving her in last position, but she was elected on transfers from party colleagues. At the Assembly, she served on the Environment Committee and as vice-chair of the Education Committee. She was re-elected to her council seat in 1985, but stood down in 1989.

In 1990, Simpson served as Chair of the Craigavon and District Housing Association.

Simpson died on 22 November 2020 at the age of 88.

Northern Ireland Assembly (1982)
New assembly	MPA for Armagh; 1982–1986	Assembly abolished
Civic offices
Preceded by Frank Dale	Mayor of Craigavon; 1981–1982	Succeeded by Sam Gardiner
