= James McDonald (Irish politician) =

Northern Irish politician

James McDonald (born 1930) was a nationalist politician in Northern Ireland.

At the 1973 Northern Ireland local elections, he won a seat on Craigavon Borough Council in the "A" area as an independent. He subsequently joined the Social Democratic and Labour Party, holding his seat in 1977 and 1981. In 1979/80, he served as Deputy Mayor of Craigavon, the first SDLP member to hold the post.

McDonald was elected in the 1982 Northern Ireland Assembly election, in South Antrim, overtaking two party colleagues on transfers. He finally stood in the new seat of Upper Bann at the 1983 general election, taking second place, with 17.8% of the vote.

Northern Ireland Assembly (1982)
New assembly	MPA for South Antrim; 1982–1986	Assembly abolished
