= David Calvert =

Northern Irish unionist politician

Member of Craigavon Borough Council
- In office 15 May 1985 – 17 May 1989
- Preceded by: District created
- Succeeded by: Ruth Allen
- Constituency: Craigavon
- In office 30 May 1973 – 15 May 1985
- Preceded by: District created
- Succeeded by: District abolished
- Constituency: Craigavon Area D

Member of the Northern Ireland Assembly for Armagh
- In office 20 October 1982 – 1986

Personal details
- Born: 1946 (age 79–80) County Armagh, Northern Ireland
- Party: Traditional Unionist Voice (since 2007); Democratic Unionist (1971 - 1993)
- Other political affiliations: Independent Unionist (2001 - 2007)

David Calvert (born 1946) is a Northern Irish unionist politician. He worked as a director of a family shirt manufacturing company. He was a founder member of the Democratic Unionist Party (DUP) in County Armagh.

== Career ==
He was elected to Craigavon Borough Council in 1973, and held his seat until he stood down in 1989.

He stood for the party in Fermanagh and South Tyrone at the Northern Ireland Constitutional Convention election in 1975, but was not elected.

He then moved to Armagh, which he contested at the 1979 UK general election, but took only 8.6% of the vote.

In the early 1980s, Calvert was Deputy Chairman of the DUP, and in the 1982 Northern Ireland Assembly election, he won a seat. In 1987, he was seriously injured in an assassination attempt on his life by the Irish National Liberation Army, but recovered fully. The INLA had also tried to kill him in 1981. He fell out with the DUP in 1993, in a dispute over candidate selection, and was expelled from the party.

Calvert stood as an independent candidate in Craigavon at the 2001 local elections, and narrowly missed taking a seat. He stood again in 2005, without success. In 2006, he attended a meeting of critics of the Belfast Agreement, addressed by Robert McCartney of the UK Unionist Party, but at the 2007 Assembly election he stood as an independent again, this time in Upper Bann, taking 3.1% of the vote.

Following the elections, Calvert joined Traditional Unionist Voice, and stood for the party in a by-election to Craigavon Borough Council in January 2010, taking a distant second place.

Northern Ireland Assembly (1982)
New assembly	MPA for Armagh; 1982–1986	Assembly abolished
