= Bríd Rodgers =

Irish politician (born 1935)

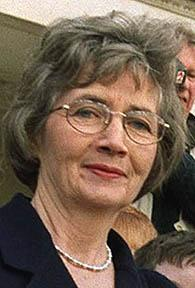
- Rodgers in 2007

Deputy Leader of the Social Democratic and Labour Party
- In office 2001–2004
- Leader: Mark Durkan
- Preceded by: Seamus Mallon
- Succeeded by: Alasdair McDonnell

Minister for Agriculture and Rural Development
- In office 2 December 1999 – 14 October 2002
- First Minister: David Trimble
- Preceded by: New Creation
- Succeeded by: Michelle Gildernew

Member of the Northern Ireland Assembly for Upper Bann
- In office 25 June 1998 – 26 November 2003
- Preceded by: New Creation
- Succeeded by: Dolores Kelly

Northern Ireland Forum Member for Upper Bann
- In office 30 May 1996 – 25 April 1998
- Preceded by: New forum
- Succeeded by: Forum dissolved

Senator
- In office 23 February 1983 – 25 April 1987
- Constituency: Nominated by the Taoiseach

Personal details
- Born: Bríd Stratford; 20 February 1935 (age 91) Gweedore, County Donegal, Ireland
- Party: Social Democratic and Labour Party
- Spouse: Antoin Rodgers (d. 2021)
- Children: 6
- Education: University College Dublin

Bríd Rodgers (née Stratford; born 20 February 1935) is an Irish nationalist former politician. She was born and raised in Gweedore in the west of County Donegal, Ireland.

Although born and brought up in a Gaeltacht area within the Republic of Ireland, she was politically active in Northern Ireland, where she was Deputy-Leader of the Social Democratic and Labour Party (SDLP) from 2001 to 2004, and a Member of the Legislative Assembly for Upper Bann from 1998 until 2003.

== Political career ==
Rodgers was educated in Monaghan and University College Dublin (UCD), and has lived in Northern Ireland since 1960. She was involved in the Northern Ireland Civil Rights Association (NICRA) from 1965. She was a founder member of the SDLP, becoming Chairman in 1978 and General Secretary in 1981. In 1983, she was nominated to Seanad Éireann by Taoiseach Garret FitzGerald, and served until 1987.

Rodgers was the leader of the SDLP team in the talks that led to the Good Friday Agreement. She was elected to the Northern Ireland Assembly for the constituency of Upper Bann in June 1998. She was appointed to the first Northern Ireland Executive in November 1999 as Minister for Agriculture and Rural Development, the first woman ever appointed as a full-ranking Agriculture Minister anywhere in Ireland; she remained in that position until the suspension of the Executive in October 2002. She became deputy leader of the SDLP in November 2001. She stood down as MLA at the Assembly elections of November 2003, and as deputy leader in February 2004, when she was replaced by Alasdair McDonnell.

== Personal life ==
Rodgers was married to Antoin Rodgers until his death in 2021. They had six children. She is a distant relative of Irish American mobster Vincent Coll. She is a native Irish-language speaker and also speaks French and Italian.

Party political offices
Preceded by Denis Haughey	Chairperson of the Social Democratic and Labour Party; 1978–1980	Succeeded by Sean Farren
Preceded by Don Canning	General Secretary of the Social Democratic and Labour Party; 1981–1983	Succeeded by Eamon Hanna
Preceded by Seamus Mallon	Deputy Leader of the Social Democratic and Labour Party; 2001–2004	Succeeded by Alasdair McDonnell
Northern Ireland Forum
New forum	Member for Upper Bann; 1996–1998	Forum dissolved
Northern Ireland Assembly
New assembly	MLA for Upper Bann; 1998–2003	Succeeded by Dolores Kelly
Political offices
New office	Minister of Agriculture and Rural Development; 1999–2000	Vacant Office suspended Title next held by self
Vacant Office suspended Title last held by self	Minister of Agriculture and Rural Development; 2000–2002	Vacant Office suspended Title next held by Michelle Gildernew
