= Craigavon Borough Council =

Former local council in Northern Ireland

Coordinates: 54.461°N 6.398°W

Craigavon Borough

- Area: 378 km^{2} (146 sq mi); Ranked 19th of 26
- District HQ: Craigavon
- Country: Northern Ireland
- Sovereign state: United Kingdom
- Website: www.craigavon.gov.uk

Map of the borough's DEAs from 1993 to 2014

Craigavon Borough Council was a local council in counties Armagh, Down and Antrim, in Northern Ireland. It merged with Armagh City and District Council and Banbridge District Council in May 2015 under local government reorganisation in Northern Ireland to become Armagh, Banbridge and Craigavon District Council.

The headquarters of the council were in Craigavon, on the shores of Lough Neagh, a new town built between Lurgan and Portadown. The council area included the large towns of Lurgan and Portadown, as well as smaller ones including Waringstown and Donaghcloney. The average council budget of £15.5 million provided a wide range of services to the 93,023 people living in the area.

The council area consisted of four electoral areas – Central, Loughside, Lurgan and Portadown – in which 26 councillors were elected every four years. The council held an annual meeting in June, at which a new Mayor and Deputy Mayor were elected. Parties elected in 2011, the last elections for the council, were Democratic Unionist Party (DUP) nine seats, Sinn Féin eight, Ulster Unionist Party (UUP) six, Social Democratic and Labour Party (SDLP) four, and Alliance Party of Northern Ireland one.

The last election was due to take place in May 2009, but on 25 April 2008, Shaun Woodward, Secretary of State for Northern Ireland announced that the scheduled 2009 district council elections were to be postponed until the introduction of the eleven new councils in 2011. The proposed reforms were abandoned in 2010, and the 2011 Northern Ireland local elections took place to fill the last body on the council before being dissolved The proposed reform took effect on 1 April 2015.

Together with part of the district of Banbridge, it was part of the Upper Bann constituency for elections to the Westminster Parliament and Northern Ireland Assembly.

== Summary of seats won 1973–2011 ==
	1973	1977	1981	1985	1989	1993	1997	2001	2005	2011
Ulster Unionist (UUP)	11	10	9	11	12	10	11	8	6	6
Alliance (APNI)	4	3	1		2	2	1			1
Vanguard (VUPP)	4									
Democratic Unionist (DUP)	3	4	7	6	4	4	3	6	9	9
Social Democratic and Labour Party (SDLP)	2	6	5	5	6	6	7	7	4	2
Independent Nationalist (IN)	1						2			
United Ulster Unionist (UUUP)		1	1							
Workers' Party (WP)		1	2	2	1	1				
Sinn Féin (SF)				2	1	2	2	4	6	8
Independent Unionist (IU)						1		1	1	

Note: The Workers' Party were known as The Republican Clubs in 1977 and Workers Party Republican Clubs in 1981.

== Mayor of Craigavon ==
Year	Name	Political affiliation	Deputy	Deputy's affiliation
1973–75	Joseph A. Johnston	UUP	James McCammick	Vanguard
1975–76	James McCammick	Vanguard	Tom Creith	UUP
1976–77	Tom Creith	UUP	Herbert Whitten	UUP
1977–78	Sydney Cairns	UUP	Brian T. English	Alliance
1978–79	Herbert Whitten	UUP	David Calvert	DUP
1979–80	Alan Locke	UUP	James McDonald	SDLP
1980–81	Frank Dale	UUP	Sean Hagan	Alliance
1981–82	Mary Simpson	UUP	David Calvert	DUP
1982–83	Sam Gardiner	UUP	James Gillespie	UUP
1983–84	James Gillespie	UUP	Frederick Baird	DUP
1984–85	Arnold Hatch	UUP	Patrick J. Crilly	SDLP
1985–87	George Savage	UUP	James Gillespie	UUP
1987–88	Sydney Cairns	UUP	Arnold Hatch	UUP
1988–89	Sam Gardiner	UUP	James McCammick	UUP
1989–91	James McCammick	UUP	Joy Savage, then Joe Trueman	UUP
1991–92	Joe Trueman	UUP	Fred Crowe	UUP
1992–93	Fred Crowe	UUP	Sam Lutton	UUP
1993–94	Joy Savage	UUP	Ruth Allen	DUP
1994–95	Brian Maguinness	UUP	Sean McKavanagh	SDLP
1995–96	Meta Crozier	UUP	Hugh Casey	SDLP
1995–96	Meta Crozier	UUP	Hugh Casey	Independent Labour
1996 – Dec 96	Hugh Casey	Independent Labour	Sam Lutton	UUP
Dec 1996 – 97	Sam Lutton	UUP	Hugh Casey	Independent Labour
1998–99	Mervyn Carrick	DUP	Dolores Kelly	SDLP
1999–00	Dolores Kelly	SDLP	Fred Crowe	UUP
2000–01	Fred Crowe	UUP	Mark Neale	UUP
2001–02	Sam Gardiner	UUP	Jonathan Bell	DUP
2002–03	Jonathan Bell	DUP	Sydney Anderson	DUP
2003–04	Ignatius Fox	SDLP	David Simpson	DUP
2004–05	David Simpson	DUP	Ignatius Fox	SDLP
2005–06	George Savage	UUP	Robert Smith	DUP
2006–07	Kenneth Twyble	UUP	Mary McAlinden	SDLP
2007–08	Robert Smith	DUP	Kenneth Twyble	UUP
2008–09	Sydney Anderson	DUP	Arnold Hatch	UUP
2009–10	Meta Crozier	UUP	Philip Weir	DUP
2010–11	Stephen Moutray	DUP	Kieran Corr	Independent
2011–12	Alan Carson	DUP	George Savage	UUP
2012–13	Carla Lockhart	DUP	Arnold Hatch	UUP
2013–14	Mark Baxter	DUP	Colin McCusker	UUP
2014–15	Colin McCusker	UUP	Catherine Seeley	Sinn Féin

Source: Freedom of Information request to Craigavon Borough Council

== Final council makeup ==
Below is a list of members who made up the final sitting of the council before it was dissolved.

Name	Party
Jonathan Buckley	DUP
Phil Moutray	DUP
Robert Smith	DUP
Mark Baxter	DUP
Margaret Tinsley	DUP
Alan Carson	DUP
Darryn Causby	DUP
Gladys McCullough	DUP
Carla Lockhart	DUP
Catherine Seeley	Sinn Féin
Mark O'Dowd	Sinn Féin
Liam Mackle	Sinn Féin
Mairead O'Dowd	Sinn Féin
Paul Duffy	Sinn Féin
Gemma McKenna	Sinn Féin
Thomas O'Connor	Sinn Féin
Noel McGeown	Sinn Féin
Kyle Savage	UUP
Arnold Hatch	UUP
Ronald Harkness	UUP
Colin McCusker	UUP
Meta Crozier	UUP
Kenneth Twyble	UUP
Declan McAlinden	SDLP
Joseph Nelson	SDLP
Conrad Dixon	Alliance

== Council services ==
- Coney Island, Lough Neagh is owned by the National Trust and was managed on their behalf by Craigavon Borough Council.

== Population ==
The area covered by Craigavon Borough Council had a population of 93,023 residents according to the 2011 Northern Ireland census.

== See also ==
- Local government in Northern Ireland
