= Carla Lockhart =

Northern Irish politician (born 1985)

Carla Lockhart MP
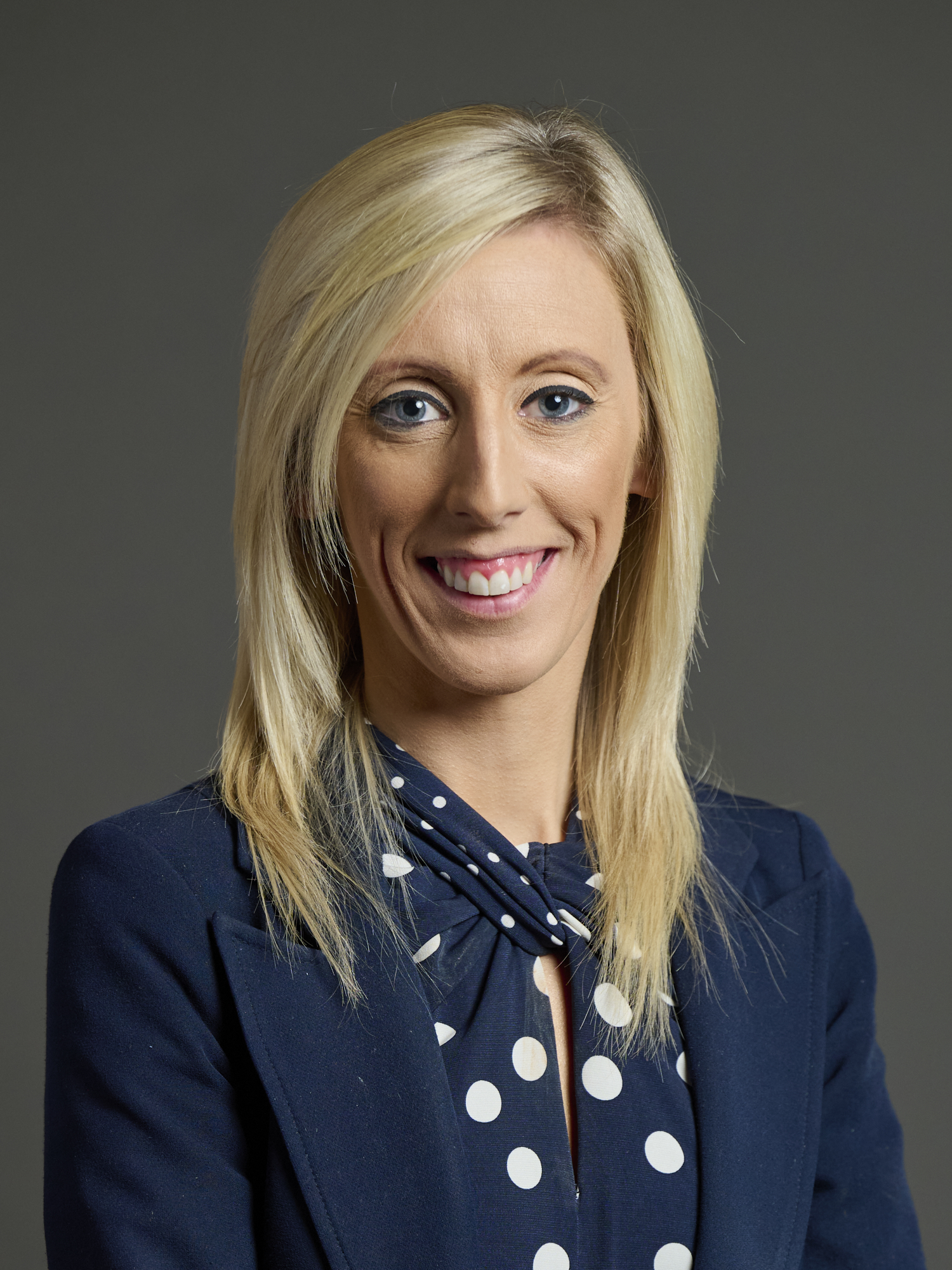
- Official portrait, 2024

Member of Parliament for Upper Bann
- Incumbent
- Assumed office 12 December 2019
- Preceded by: David Simpson
- Majority: 7,406 (15.6%)

Member of the Legislative Assembly for Upper Bann
- In office 5 May 2016 – 13 December 2019
- Preceded by: Stephen Moutray
- Succeeded by: Diane Dodds

Member of Armagh City, Banbridge and Craigavon Borough Council
- In office 22 May 2014 – 5 May 2016
- Preceded by: Council established
- Succeeded by: Terry McWilliams
- Constituency: Lurgan

Mayor of Craigavon
- In office 2012–2013
- Preceded by: Alan Carson
- Succeeded by: Mark Baxter

Member of Craigavon Borough Council
- In office 2007 – 22 May 2014
- Preceded by: Fergie Dawson
- Succeeded by: Council abolished
- Constituency: Lurgan

Personal details
- Born: Carla Rebecca Lockhart; 28 February 1985 (age 41) Aughnacloy, Northern Ireland
- Party: Independent (since 2026); Democratic Unionist Party (until 2026)
- Spouse: Rodney Condell
- Children: 1
- Education: Ulster University (BSc)

Carla Rebecca Lockhart (born 28 February 1985) is a Northern Irish unionist politician who has been the Member of Parliament (MP) for Upper Bann since the 2019 general election. Formerly a member of the Democratic Unionist Party (DUP), she served as the DUP spokesperson for environment, food and rural affairs. Lockhart left the party in November 2026 to become an Independent Unionist over the Drumcree dispute and Irish Sea Border. She was previously a member of the Northern Ireland Assembly for Upper Bann from 2016 to 2019.

== Early life and career ==
Carla Rebecca Lockhart was born on 28 February 1985 in Aughnacloy, County Tyrone, to Kenneth and Valerie Lochhart, and was raised in a working-class family. She attended Aughnacloy High School before studying at Armagh Tech, now part of Southern Regional College, and later obtained a degree in business from the University of Ulster. Interested in politics from an early age, she was a member of the DUP's Young Democrats.

== Political career ==
Lockhart was elected to Craigavon Borough Council in 2007, representing the Lurgan area. She was Mayor of Craigavon from 2012 to 2013, and stepped down in 2016 to run for the Assembly elections. Lockhart was President of the Local Government Association of Northern Ireland from 2015 to 2016.

She worked full-time in the Lurgan DUP Advice Centre under Stephen Moutray, whilst working as a councillor. Lockhart was elected as an MLA for Upper Bann in 2016.

On 8 November 2019, Lockhart announced her candidacy for the Upper Bann Westminster constituency at the 2019 general election. On 13 December, Lockhart won the seat in Westminster, succeeding the retiring MP David Simpson, and stepped down from her seat as MLA for Upper Bann.

Lockhart is a governor at Lurgan Junior High School and Magheralin Primary School.

Despite previously stating during a 2017 interview that having no functioning Northern Ireland Executive was one of the biggest problems facing the citizens of Northern Ireland, in November 2022 Lockhart defended the DUP's collapse of the same institutions by claiming the party had a democratic mandate to do so.

In December 2022, Lockhart, Miriam Cates and Rosie Duffield signed a cross-party letter asking the British Government to block the Scottish Government's Gender Recognition Reform (Scotland) Bill.

Lockhart retained her seat, with a decreased majority of 7,406 votes, at the 2024 general election. Despite a reduced majority, she increased her share of the vote to 45.7%, being the only DUP MP to do so.

Lockhart did not attend the first meeting of the new parliament in July 2024. She instead attended a planning committee meeting of Armagh, Banbridge and Craigavon Council, where she spoke against plans to include Irish language on street signs in Portadown. Claiming to speak on behalf of residents and Orange lodges, Lockhart said the plans were meant to "whip up tension", to "mark territory", and to "cleanse this area of Protestantism".

In April 2025, Lockhart called for Kneecap to be denied entry to the US and Canada ahead of their US-Canada tour after allegations of the rap trio calling for the death of British MPs and shouting "up Hamas, up Hezbollah" in previous gigs.

Lockhart tabled a motion in parliament in February 2026, calling for a law banning the "glorification" of convicted terrorists. This was in response to tributes that had been paid to a recently-deceased IRA member.

In April 2026, Lockhart called for Marks & Spencer to reintroduce Union Flag branded bags to their Northern Ireland stores.

Lockhart condemned the Public Health Agency in June 2026 for publishing harm reduction advice for anyone taking drugs at festivals. Lockhart called for the advice to be taken down, saying "There is no safe way to take illegal drugs". The PHA defended its advice, saying it is "derived from evidence-based harm-reduction guidance".

=== Scarva and Drumcree marches ===
In the long-running Drumcree dispute, Lockhart has supported attempts by the Protestant Orange Order to march through the mainly-Catholic part of Portadown, which is in her constituency. The residents oppose the march.

On 6 June 2026, the Ireland Palestine Solidarity Campaign (IPSC) held a sponsored walk from Lurgan to Newry for humanitarian aid to Gaza. Lockhart supported Unionist residents who sought to block it from the village of Scarva, calling it an unwanted "republican march" that would cause disruption, disorder, and harm community relations. The Parades Commission allowed the procession to go along a towpath, but banned it from entering the village and imposed other restrictions. It also allowed a counter-protest.She issued a joint statement with other DUP representatives, saying:

"Residents are entitled to go about their daily lives without unnecessary disruption from what is widely viewed as a deliberately provocative parade which serves no legitimate purpose within the area. We strongly impressed upon the Commission that the protection of community relations and public order must come before facilitating a deeply divisive demonstration".

Lockhart was criticised for standing alongside a crowd of masked men at the counter-protest in Scarva. The IPSC, local politicians and the media variously reported that counter-protesters waved Israeli flags and shouted sectarian, racist, misogynistic and other abuse at the walkers. At the time, Lockhart had thanked the pro-Israeli protesters "for their dignified actions". Her party defended her, and she refused to apologise, saying "I stood with my people" to prevent tensions escalating and helped to avert "an absolute bloodbath".

Lockhart and the Portadown Orangemen argued that, because the IPSC walk was allowed to go ahead despite unionist opposition, the Orange Order should also be allowed to march on Garvaghy Road.

In July 2026, Lockhart's conduct at Scarva was raised during a High Court judicial review of the Parades Commission's decision to ban the Orange Order parade from Garvaghy Road in Portadown. Lockhart had written to the Parades Commission in support of the Orangemen's position. On 3 July, Mr Justice McAlinden questioned the weight that should be placed on her representations in light of her appearance alongside masked counter-protesters at Scarva, saying that her conduct had the potential to "devalue her intervention" and caused him concern about "placing too much weight" on her correspondence. John Larkin KC told the court on Lockhart's behalf that she condemned masked persons and criminality and that she had been specifically asked by the Police Service of Northern Ireland (PSNI) to attend the Scarva protest. The following day, a PSNI spokesperson said that Lockhart had not been asked to attend the protest, nor had any elected representatives. Lockhart accused The Irish News of "selective reporting".

The High Court overturned the Parades Commission's ban, and the Orange Order applied for another march on Garvaghy Road. Lockhart said the ruling was a "massive victory for unionism and loyalism" and called for the Commission to resign. She supported the Orangemen in their renewed bid to march on Garvaghy Road, saying that the Catholic residents and Irish nationalist politicians who opposed the march "need to emotionally regulate". Lockhart said that their rights would no longer be "elevated" above those of the Orange Order.

Following this, the Parades Commission approved the Orange march on Garvaghy Road, for the first time in 28 years. Thousands of residents stood on the road to block the march. Police said that removing at least "1,000 people from the Garvaghy Road, including women, children and older people, would have required such a significant use of force that public safety would have been significantly jeopardised, people seriously hurt and disorder inevitable". Lockhart called the thousands of protesters "an absolute rabble"; she demanded police enforce the law and clear the road for the Orangemen.

In October 2026, Lockhart resigned from her position as a DUP party officer because she disagreed with the party's refusal to leave the executive over Michelle O'Neill's attendance at the protest. The following month, she left the DUP, describing the decision as being "on a point of principle", and said that she would remain in the House of Commons as an independent unionist.

== Personal life ==
Lockhart is a member of the Free Presbyterian Church of Ulster. She is married to Rodney Condell, a quantity surveyor. They have a son, born in 2019.

Civic offices
Preceded by Alan Carson	Mayor of Craigavon; 2012–2013	Succeeded by Mark Baxter
Northern Ireland Assembly
Preceded by Stephen Moutray	Member of the Legislative Assembly for Upper Bann; 2016–2019	Succeeded by Diane Dodds
Parliament of the United Kingdom
Preceded by David Simpson	Member of Parliament for Upper Bann; 2019–present	Incumbent
