= List of statutory rules and orders of Northern Ireland, 1942 =

This is an incomplete list of statutory rules and orders of Northern Ireland during 1941. Statutory rules and orders were the predecessor of statutory rules and they formed the secondary legislation of Northern Ireland between 1922 and 1973.

Number	Title
No. 1 & 2	
No. 3	The Marketing of Pigs (Form of Curers' Returns) (Revocation) Order (Northern Ireland) 1941
No. 4	The Vessels on Inland Waters (Immobilisation) (Northern Ireland) Order (Northern Ireland) 1941
No. 5	The Factories (Glass Protection) Order (Northern Ireland) 1941
No. 6	The Bacon Industry (Pig Nutrition Research Grant) Order (Northern Ireland) 1941
No. 7	
No. 8	The Fire Watchers Order (Northern Ireland) 1941
No. 9	The Emergency Powers (Defence) Disposal of Motor Vehicles Order (Northern Ireland) 1941
No. 10	
No. 11	The Electricity Supply (War Damage) Order (Northern Ireland) 1941
No. 12	The Swine Fever (Emergency Sale) Order (Northern Ireland) 1941
No. 13	The Emergency Powers (Defence) Road Vehicles Order (Northern Ireland) 1941
No. 14 - 20	
No. 21	The Specified Classes of Persons (Registration) (No. 2) Order (Northern Ireland) 1941
No. 22 - 24	
No. 25	The Ice Cream (Sales) (Revocation) Order (Northern Ireland) 1941
No. 26	The Feeding Stuffs (Rationing) (Appointed Day) Order (Northern Ireland) 1941
No. 27 - 31	
No. 32	The Road Vehicles Lighting (Special Exemption) Order (Northern Ireland) 1941
No. 33	The Fire Precautions (Access to Premises) Order (Northern Ireland) 1941
No. 34	The Fire Prevention (Business Premises) Order (Northern Ireland) 1941
No. 35	The Civil Defence Duties (Compulsory Enrolment) Order (Northern Ireland) 1941
No. 36 - 39	
No. 40	The Petroleum Spirit in Harbours Order (Northern Ireland) 1941
No. 41	The Government Explosives in Harbours Order (Northern Ireland) 1941
No. 42	The Feeding Stuffs (General Licence and Directions) Order (Northern Ireland) 1941
No. 43	The Feeding Stuffs (Undried Grains) Order (Northern Ireland) 1941
No. 44	
No. 45	The Public Elementary School (Teachers' War Service) Amendment No. 1 Regulations (Northern Ireland) 1941
No. 46	The Explosive Substance (Licensed Stores) Order (Northern Ireland) 1941
No. 47	The Royal Ulster Constabulary Pensions (Amendment) Order (Northern Ireland) 1941
No. 48 - 53	
No. 54	The Feeding Stuffs (General Licence and Directions) Amendment Order (Northern Ireland) 1941
No. 55	
No. 56	The Feeding Stuffs (Rationing) (Oat Husks) Order (Northern Ireland) 1941
No. 57	The Road Vehicles Licensing (Leave Permit) Regulations (Northern Ireland) 1941
No. 58 & 59	
No. 60	The Road Vehicles Licensing (Leave Permit) Regulations (Northern Ireland) 1941
No. 61 - 70	
No. 71	The Secondary Teachers No. 2 Amendment Regulations (Northern Ireland) 1941
No. 72	The Public Elementary Schools (Evacuated Children) Amendment No. 1 Regulations (Northern Ireland) 1941
No. 73	The Public Elementary Schools Amendment No. 12 Regulations (Northern Ireland) 1941
No. 74	The Technical Teachers Amendment No. 1 Regulations (Northern Ireland) 1941
No. 75	The Ulster 31/2 per cent. Stock (Sinking Fund) Regulations (Northern Ireland) 1941
No. 76	The Feeding Stuffs (Regulations of Supplies) Order (Northern Ireland) 1941
No. 77	The Unemployment Assistance (Prevention and Relief of Distress) (Refugees) Regulations (Northern Ireland) 1941
No. 78 - 84	
No. 85	The Civil Defence Duties (Exemption Tribunals) Order (Northern Ireland) 1941
No. 86	
No. 87	The Defence Areas Order (Northern Ireland) 1941
No. 88	
No. 89	The Civil Defence (Exemption of Works of Shelter) Regulations (Northern Ireland) 1941
No. 90	The Undertakings (Restriction on Engagement) Order (Northern Ireland) 1941
No. 91 - 93	
No. 94	The Factories (Standards of Lighting) Regulations (Northern Ireland) 1941
No. 95	The Special Constabulary (Position of Special Constables) Regulations (Northern Ireland) 1941
No. 96	The Ulster Savings Certificates Interest (Sinking Fund) Regulations (Northern Ireland) 1941
No. 97	
No. 98	The Reserve Fund Regulations (Northern Ireland) 1941
No. 99 & 100	
No. 101	The Fire Precautions (Access to Premises) (No. 2) Order (Northern Ireland) 1941
No. 102	The Factories (Canteens) Order (Northern Ireland) 1941
No. 103	The Feeding Stuffs (Regulations of Supplies) (No. 2) Order (Northern Ireland) 1941
No. 104	The Feeding Stuffs (General Licence and Directions) Order (Northern Ireland) 1941
No. 105	The Storage Facilities (Information) Order (Northern Ireland) 1941
No. 106	
No. 107	The Petty Sessions: Districts and Times Order (Northern Ireland) 1941
No. 108	The Live Stock Breeding Amendment Rules (Northern Ireland) 1941
No. 109	
No. 110	The Control of Traffic at Belfast Port Order (Northern Ireland) 1941
No. 111	
No. 112	The Blind Persons Determination of Needs (Appointed Day) Order (Northern Ireland) 1941
No. 113	The Unemployment Assistance (Determination of Need and Assessment Needs) Regulations (Northern Ireland) 1941
No. 114 & 115	
No. 116	The Feeding Stuffs (General Licence and Directions) Order (Northern Ireland) 1941
No. 117	The Bricks and Stone (Control) Order (Northern Ireland) 1941
No. 118	The Unemployment Insurance (Insurance Industry Special Scheme) (Amendment) Order (Northern Ireland) 1941
No. 119	The Supplementary Pensions (Determination of Need and Assessment of Needs) (Amendment) Regulations (Northern Ireland) 1941
No. 120	The Electricity (Main Transmission Lines) Order (Northern Ireland) 1941
No. 121	The Essential Work (Merchant Navy) Order (Northern Ireland) 1941
No. 122	The Restriction of Traffic on Roads Order (Northern Ireland) 1941
No. 123	
No. 124	The Police (Employment and Offences) Order (Northern Ireland) 1941
No. 125	The Exercise of Powers (Appropriate Department) Order (Northern Ireland) 1941
No. 126	The Intoxicating Liquor (Licences) Rates of Charges Order (Northern Ireland) 1941
No. 127	The Lifting of Potatoes (Prohibition) (Northern Ireland) Order (Northern Ireland) 1941
No. 128	
No. 129	The Bacon Industry (Curers' Levy) Regulations (Northern Ireland) 1941
No. 130	
No. 131	The Police (Employment and Offences) (No. 2) Order (Northern Ireland) 1941
No. 132	The Civil Defence (Compulsory Area) Order (Northern Ireland) 1941
No. 133	The Emergency Powers (Defence) Road Vehicles (Amendment) Order (Northern Ireland) 1941
No. 134	The Workmen's Compensation Rules (Northern Ireland) 1941
No. 135	The Variation of Order in Council as to Establishment of Ministry of Public Security Order (Northern Ireland) 1941
No. 136	The Belfast County Borough Council (City Surveyor's Staff Qualifications) Order (Northern Ireland) 1941
No. 137	The Feeding Stuffs (Control) (Oat By-products) Order (Northern Ireland) 1941
No. 138	The Feeding Stuffs (Rationing) (Oat By-products) Order (Northern Ireland) 1941
No. 139	The Ministry of Public Security: Transfer of Functions (Variation) Order (Northern Ireland) 1941
No. 140	The Public Security (Maps) Order (Northern Ireland) 1941
No. 141	The Petty Sessions: Districts and Times Order (Northern Ireland) 1941
No. 142 & 143	
No. 144	The Sheep Dipping (Special Regulations) Order (Northern Ireland) 1941
No. 145	The Transit of Animals (Amendment) Order (Northern Ireland) 1941
No. 146	The Location of Industry (Restriction) Order (Northern Ireland) 1941
No. 147	The Location of Industry (General Licence) Order (Northern Ireland) 1941
No. 148	
No. 149	The Public Security (Prohibition of Processions) (Amendment) Order (Northern Ireland) 1941
No. 150 - 153	
No. 154	The Petty Sessions (District and Times) Order (Northern Ireland) 1941
No. 155	
No. 156	The Emergency Powers (Defence) (Carriage of Workers) Order (Northern Ireland) 1941
No. 157	
No. 158	The Control of Fertilisers (No. 1) Order (Northern Ireland) 1941
No. 159	
No. 160	The Malone Training School Regulations (Northern Ireland) 1941
No. 161	The Control of Building and Civil Engineering Contracting Undertakings Order (Northern Ireland) 1941
No. 162	The Royal Ulster Constabulary Pay (Amendment) Order (Northern Ireland) 1941
No. 163	The Marketing of Fruit (Amendment) Rules (Northern Ireland) 1941
No. 164	
No. 165	The Emergency Powers (Defence) (County Antrim Speed Limit) Order (Northern Ireland) 1941
No. 166	The Restriction of Traffic (Crumlin Road) Order (Northern Ireland) 1941
No. 167	The Oats (Exports) Order (Northern Ireland) 1941
No. 168	The Tuberculosis (Procedure of Committees) Order (Northern Ireland) 1941
No. 169	The National Health Insurance (Dental Benefit) Amendment Regulations (Northern Ireland) 1941
No. 170	The Tillage General Order (Northern Ireland) 1941
No. 171 & 172	
No. 173	The Special Constables Regulations (Northern Ireland) 1941
No. 174	The Defence (Billeting Tribunals) Rules (Northern Ireland) 1941
No. 175	
No. 176	The Conditions of Employment and National Arbitration (Amendment) Order (Northern Ireland) 1941
No. 177 & 178	
No. 179	The Tillage General (No. 2) Order (Northern Ireland) 1941
No. 180	The Control of Fertilisers (No. 2) Order (Northern Ireland) 1941
No. 181	The Agricultural Returns Order (Northern Ireland) 1941
No. 182	The Workmen's Compensation (Industrial Diseases) Order (Northern Ireland) 1941
No. 183	The Grass Seeds and Fertilisers General Order (Northern Ireland) 1941
No. 184	The Secondary School Grants Amendment No. 2 Regulations (Northern Ireland) 1941
No. 185	The Technical Attendance Grants Amendment No. 3 Regulations (Northern Ireland) 1941
No. 186	The Emergency Powers (Defence) (County Londonderry Speed Limit) Order (Northern Ireland) 1941
No. 187	The Bacon Industry (Pig Nutrition Research Grant) (No. 2) Order (Northern Ireland) 1941
No. 188	The Fire Prevention (Business Premises) Order (Northern Ireland) 1941
No. 189	The Coal Supply Order (Northern Ireland) 1941
No. 190	The National Health Insurance (Deposit Contributors) Amendment Regulations (Northern Ireland) 1941
No. 191	
No. 192	The Roads Vehicles (Leave Permit) (Amendment) Regulations (Northern Ireland) 1941
No. 193	The Roads Vehicles (Leave Permit) (Amendment) Regulations (Northern Ireland) 1941
No. 194	The Standing Passengers Order (Northern Ireland) 1941
No. 195	The Public Utility Undertakings (Prevention of Publications) Order (Northern Ireland) 1941
1941 No. 196	
No. 197	The Clogher Valley Railway: Discontinuation Order (Northern Ireland) 1941
No. 198	The Methodist Church in I. (Temporary Provisions) Order (Northern Ireland) 1941
No. 199	The Ministries (Transfer of Functions and Adaptation of Enactments) (Northern Ireland) 1941
No. 200	The Restriction of Traffic (Goods Vehicle) (Co. Down) Order (Northern Ireland) 1941
No. 201	The Restriction of Traffic (Goods Vehicle) (Co. Londonderry) Order (Northern Ireland) 1941
No. 202	The Restriction of Traffic (Goods Vehicle) (Co. Tyrone) Order (Northern Ireland) 1941
No. 203	The Joint Milk Council (Election of Members by Producers) Regulations (Northern Ireland) 1941
No. 204	The Joint Milk Council (Election of Members by Distributors) Regulations (Northern Ireland) 1941
No. 205	The Exported Animals (Compensation) (Suspension of Charges) Order (Northern Ireland) 1941
No. 206	The Factories (Examination of Plant) Order (Northern Ireland) 1941
No. 207	The Workmen's Compensation Rules (Northern Ireland) 1941
No. 208	The Parliamentary Grant (Education Authorities) Regulations (Northern Ireland) 1941
No. 209	The Emergency Powers (Defence) (County Down Speed Limit) Order (Northern Ireland) 1941
No. 210	The Liabilities (War -Time Adjustment) Rules (Northern Ireland) 1941
No. 211	The Unemployment Assistance (Appeal Tribunals) (Revocation) Regulations (Northern Ireland) 1941
No. 212	The Secondary Teachers No. 2 Amendment Regulations (Northern Ireland) 1941
No. 213	The National Health Insurance (Joint Committee) Regulations (Northern Ireland) 1941
No. 214	The Contributory Pensions (Joint Committee) Regulations (Northern Ireland) 1941
No. 215	The Coal (Records and Information) Order (Northern Ireland) 1941
No. 216	Trade Scholarships Regulations 1927 Amending Regulations No. 3 (Northern Ireland) 1941

== See also ==
- List of statutory rules of Northern Ireland
