= Millvale =

Millvale may refer to:

- Millvale, Cincinnati, Ohio
- Millvale, Pennsylvania
- Millvale, Prince Edward Island
- Millvale, Bessbrook, Northern Ireland

== See also ==
- Milvale, New South Wales, Australia
