= Clogher Valley Railway =

Railway line in Northern Ireland

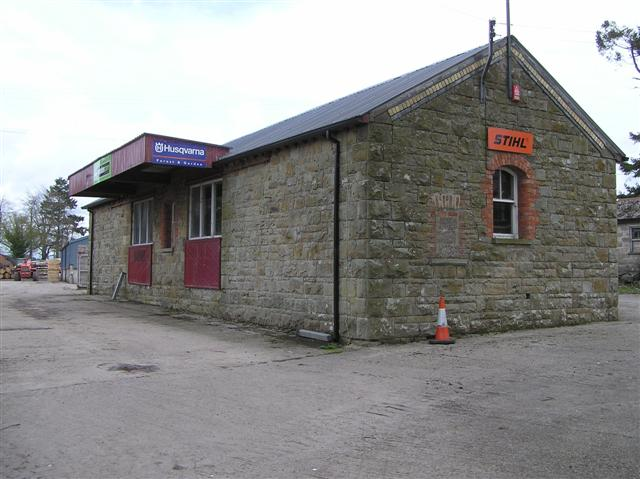
- Part of the former Clogher Railway Station that is now used as a commercial units

Overview
- Locale: County Tyrone and County Fermanagh, Northern Ireland
- Dates of operation: May 1887–1 January 1942

Technical
- Track gauge: 3 ft (914 mm)
- Length: 37 miles (60 km)
- Track length: 40 miles 30 chains (65.0 km)

The Clogher Valley Railway was a 37-mile-long (60 km), 3 ft (914 mm) narrow gauge railway in County Tyrone and County Fermanagh, Northern Ireland. It opened in May 1887 and closed on 1 January 1942 (with the last trains running the previous day).

== Route ==
The railway was mainly situated in rural parts of County Tyrone, which hindered the company's potential profitability. The western terminus was Maguiresbridge, County Fermanagh, (Note: 54.295°N 7.463°W) where the line shared Maguiresbridge railway station with the Great Northern Railway (Ireland) on the Clones to Enniskillen line. It then proceeded in a north-easterly direction through stations at Brookeborough, Colebrooke, Fivemiletown, Clogher and Augher until reaching Ballygawley station, at which point the line turned in a south-easterly direction to Aughnacloy, Caledon and the eastern terminus at Tynan, County Armagh (Note: 54.3395°N 6.8213°W) (where the Great Northern Railway was again met, this time on the Clones to Portadown line) Aughnacloy was the line's principal station and the location of the company's headquarters and workshops. Fivemiletown was the second largest station. Like a tramway, the line passed down the middle of the Main Streets of both Fivemiletown and Caledon. The railway ran alongside the public roadway for nearly all of its length.

== Early years ==
It was originally known as the Clogher Valley Tramway, but changed its legal status and its name to the Clogher Valley Railway in 1894. The start was not auspicious, the company required a loan of £44,000 from the Board of Works to enable the line to be finished. It was constructed under the terms of the Tramways and Public Companies (Ireland) Act 1883 (46 & 47 Vict. c. 43) and the Clogher Valley Tramway Order 1884 confirmed by the Tramways (Ireland) Provisional Order Confirmation (Clogher Valley) Act 1884 (47 & 48 Vict. c. ccxviii).

The railway was built to a track gauge of 3 feet. Extensions were planned, including a branch line from Ballygawley to Dungannon and an eastwards link to the Bessbrook and Newry Tramway, but were never built. Prior to the 1930s the line was worked entirely by steam locomotives, with six tank engines built by Sharp Stewart. For almost all of its existence the railway made a loss (and required a subsidy from local ratepayers). The greatest profit ever made by the company was in 1904 – only £791.

== Later years ==
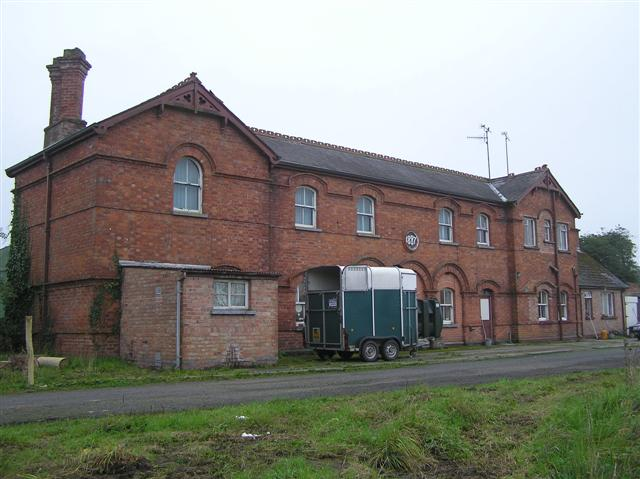
2006 photo of the former Aughnacloy station building

From 1921 onwards, the line found itself located entirely within Northern Ireland (although running close to the border with the Irish Free State for almost its entire route). In 1922 a commission appointed by the Government of Northern Ireland recommended that the loss-making line should be taken over by the Great Northern Railway (Ireland), but the GNR(I) declined. The company struggled on, until it was taken over by a committee of management appointed by Tyrone and Fermanagh county councils in 1928. Henry Forbes, the manager of the County Donegal Railways Joint Committee (CDRJC), was one of the members of the new committee and was instrumental in introducing diesel traction – a then novel form of motive power. To reduce operating costs, two diesel vehicles were built for the railway by Walker Brothers of Wigan – a 28-seat railbus in 1932 and a rail lorry in 1933. The railbus was virtually identical to those operated by the CDRJC (which purchased both vehicles following the line's closure). In 1932 the CDRJC also acquired the CVR's unsuccessful steam tram locomotive built by Atkinson Walker, which was rebuilt as "Phoenix" with a diesel engine. This locomotive is now preserved at the Ulster Folk and Transport Museum at Cultra. The last trains ran on 31 December 1941, the railway becoming a victim of road competition and cost-saving measures during World War II. The closure was authorised by the Clogher Valley Railway and Roads Act (Northern Ireland) 1941 (5 & 6 Geo. 6. c. 13 (N.I.)), with the formal date of closure, 1 January 1942, being set by the Clogher Valley Railway: Discontinuation Order (Northern Ireland) 1941 (SR&O(NI) 1941/197).

The company was eventually dissolved by the Clogher Valley Railway Company (Winding-up) Act (Northern Ireland) 1944 (c. 11 (N.I.))

== See also ==
- List of heritage railways in Northern Ireland
- List of narrow-gauge railways in Ireland
