= Aughnacloy =

Aughnacloy may refer to:

- Aughnacloy, County Armagh, a townland in County Armagh, Northern Ireland
- Aughnacloy, County Down, a townland near Banbridge, County Down, Northern Ireland
- Aughnacloy, County Tyrone, a village in County Tyrone, Northern Ireland
