= Samuel Geoghegan =

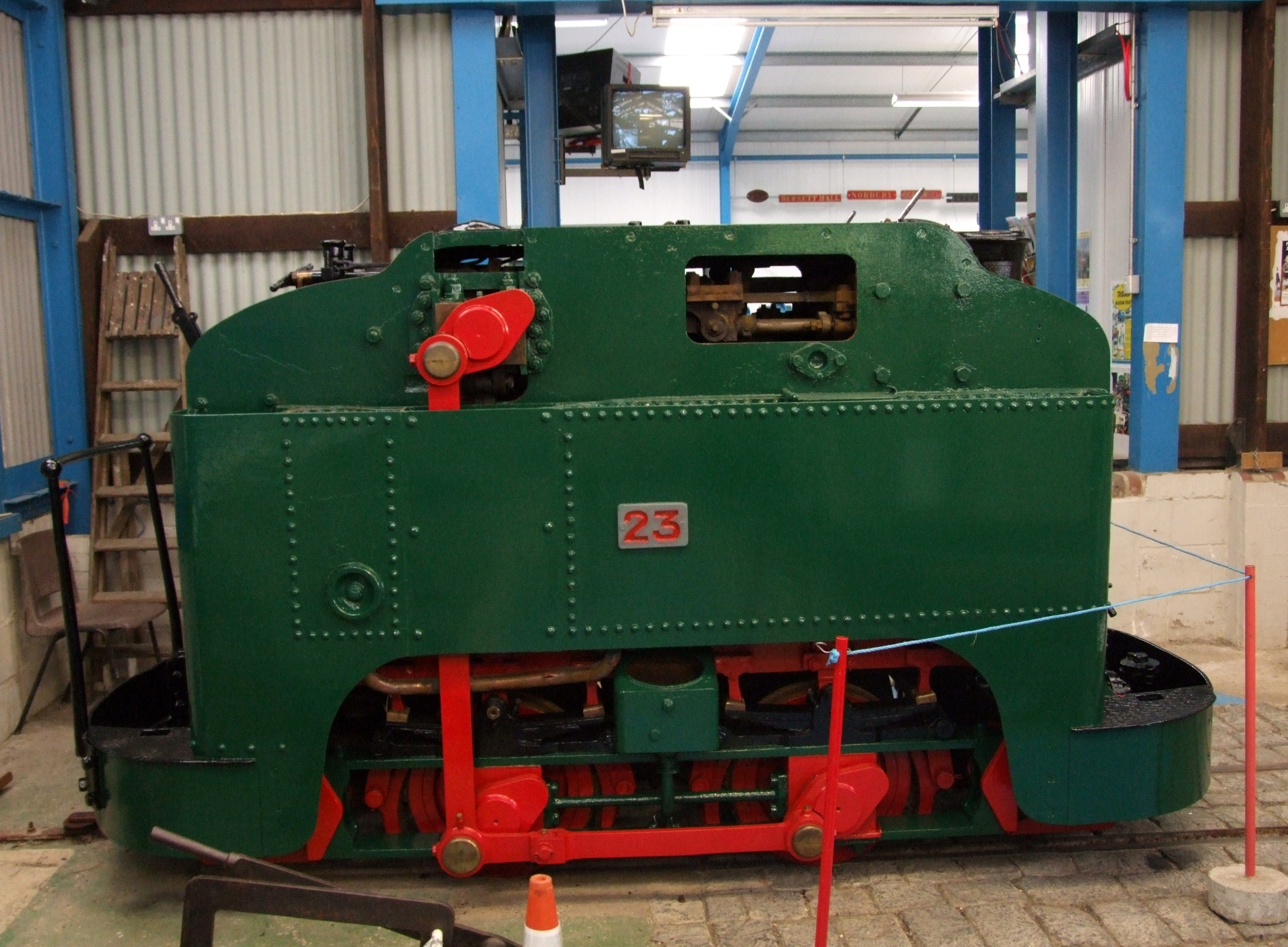
Samuel Geohegan's steam locomotive No 23 exhibited at Amberley Museum Railway

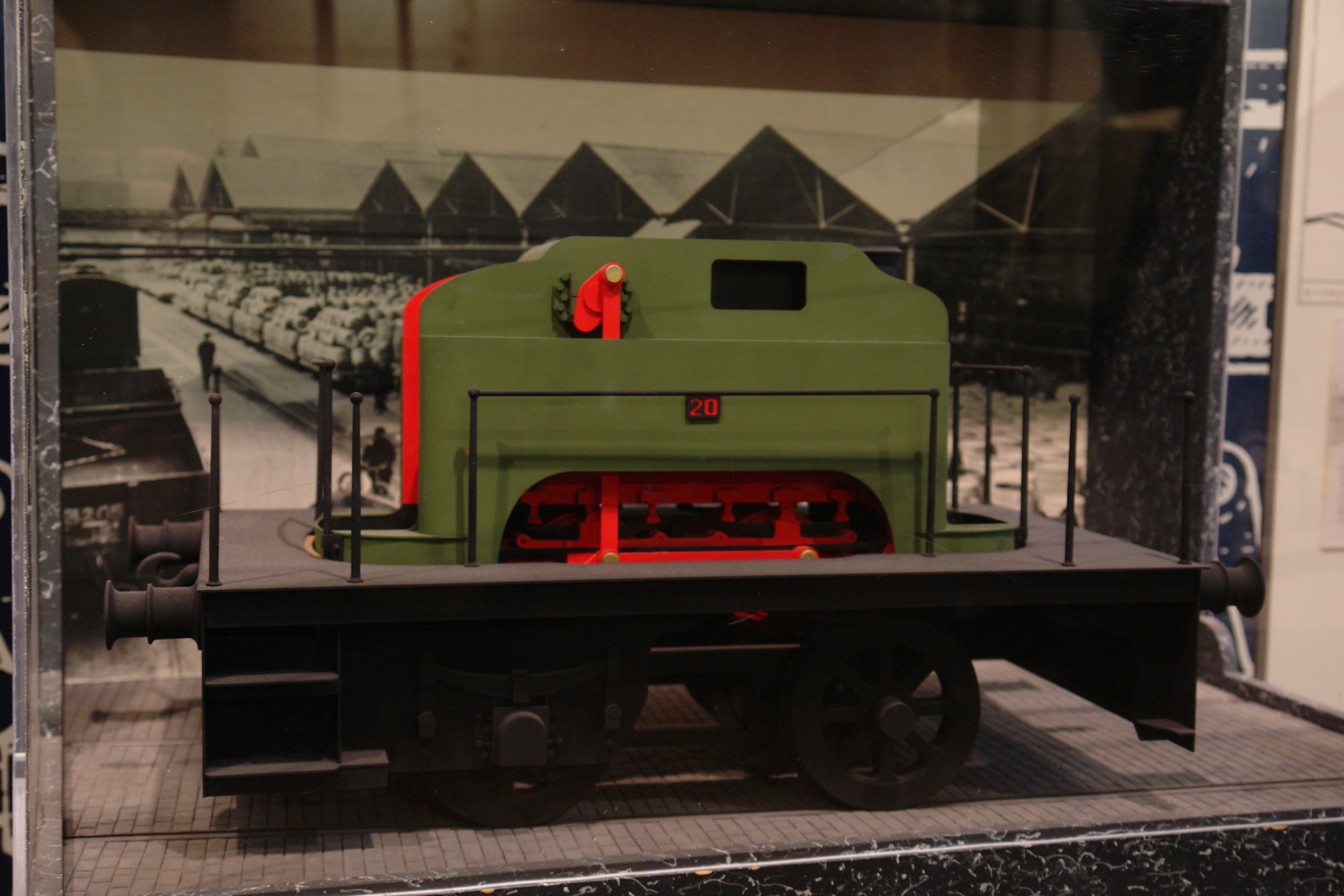
Model of Guinness Brewery Samuel Geohegan's haulage wagon and steam locomotive No 20 exhibited at Ulster Transport Museum, Cultra

Samuel Geoghegan (1845 in Dublin – 4 September 1928) was an Irish mechanical engineer.

== Life and career ==
Samuel Geoghegan was in 1861, according to the English census of that year, a pupil of a schoolmaster named Richard Biggs in Devizes, Wiltshire. He was then for three years an apprentice at the engineering company Walter May & Co of Birmingham and was afterwards a draughtsman with P. and W. MacLelland, and Howden & Co of Glasgow and a fitter with Fawcett, Preston & Co of Liverpool.

In 1869 he went to Smyrna in Turkey as a mechanic and draughtsman with the Ottoman Railway, and two years later he returned to England as a fitter in the Doncaster Locomotive Works of the Great Northern Railway.

In 1871 he went to India and was engaged on the construction of a bridge two miles long over the river Chenab in the Punjab, first as assistant engineer and then as executive engineer in charge of half the bridge. Subsequently, he was for a year a district locomotive superintendent on the railway near Delhi.

In 1874 he was appointed chief engineer to Arthur Guinness & Son of Dublin, and he retained this position until 1901, when he became consulting engineer to the company. In 1880 he became a Member of the Institution of Mechanical Engineers.

In 1882 he invented and patented a lightweight steam locomotive with all moving parts high above the dirty floor to fit within a 6 ft (1.8 m) loading gauge. He invented also a Haulage Wagon by which his patented narrow gauge locomotives could be used on broad gauge track.

By 1899, he had become head of the Guinness Brewery's electrical and mechanical engineering staff. He retired on 9 July 1901, at the age of 56, but was retained as a consultant until 11 February 1905. After his retirement, he ran a private practice from 17 Westland Row.

He had married in 1876 and had five children. He died on 4 September 1928.
