= Ulster Folk and Transport Museums =

Ulster Folk Museum and Ulster Transport Museum
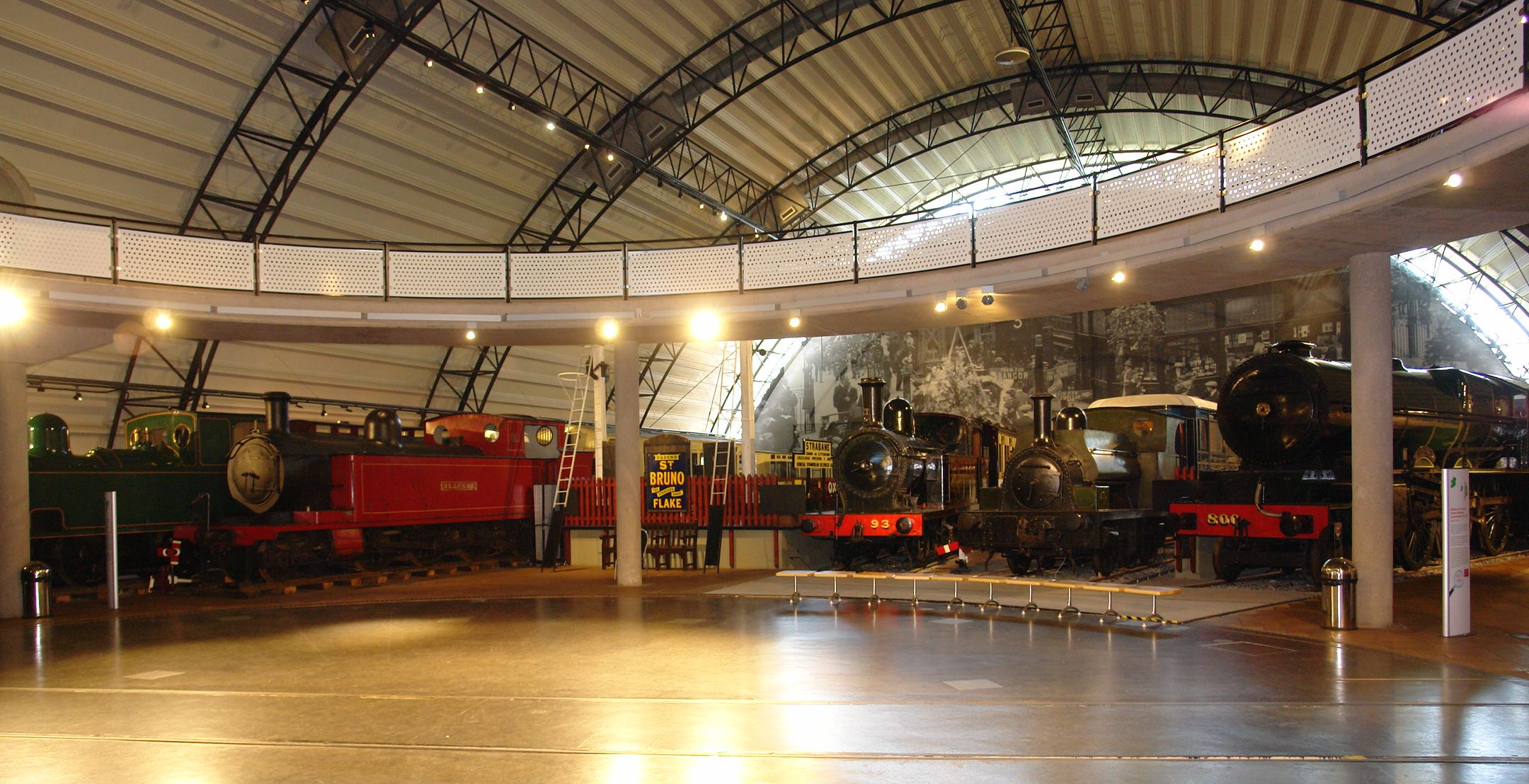
- Rail Gallery of the Ulster Transport Museum

- Location within County Down
- Established: 1967
- Location: Cultra, Northern Ireland
- Coordinates: 54°38′57″N 5°47′56″W
- Type: Transport Museum
- Visitors: 172,712 (2019)
- Public transit access: 501A, 501B
- Website: https://www.ulsterfolkmuseum.org/ Ulster Folk Museum]; Ulster Transport Museum

Both the Ulster Folk Museum and Ulster Transport Museum are situated in Cultra, Northern Ireland, about 11 kilometres (6.8 mi) east of the city of Belfast. Now operating as two separate museums, the Folk Museum endeavours to illustrate the way of life and traditions of the people in Northern Ireland, past and present, while the Transport Museum explores and exhibits methods of transport by land, sea and air, past and present. The museums rank among Ireland's foremost visitor attractions and is a former Irish Museum of the Year. The location houses two of four museums included in National Museums NI.

== Folk Museum ==
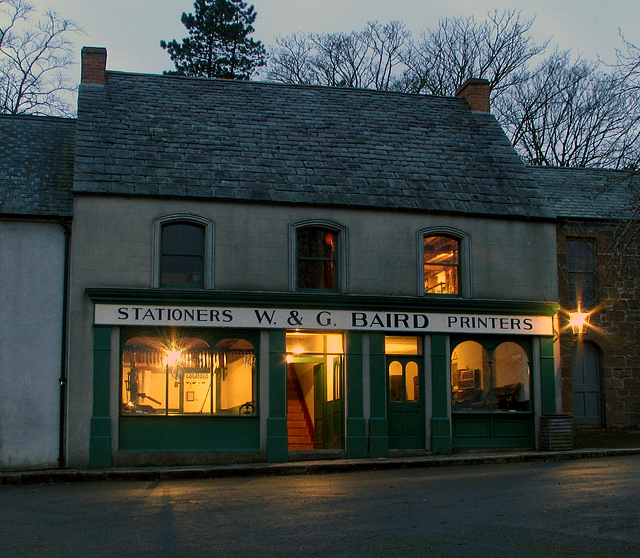
W. and G. Baird Stationers and Printers

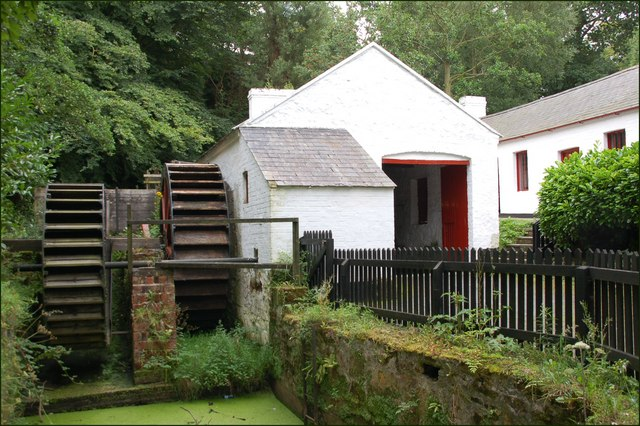
The waterwheel which powered the Coalisland spade mill

=== History ===
Ulster Folk Museum Act (Northern Ireland) 1958
- Act of Parliament
- Parliament of Northern Ireland
- Citation: 1958 c. 7 (N.I.)
- Territorial extent: Northern Ireland

Dates
- Royal assent: 10 June 1958
- Commencement: 1 October 1958 (Note: Section 1(1). The Ulster Folk Museum (Appointed Day) Order (Northern Ireland) 1958 (SI 1958/154).)
Other legislation
Amended by	Northern Ireland Assembly Disqualification Act 1975

Authorised by the Ulster Folk Museum Act (Northern Ireland) 1958 (c. 7 (N.I.)), the museum was created to preserve a rural way of life in danger of disappearing forever due to increasing urbanisation and industrialisation in Northern Ireland. The 136-acre (55 ha) site the museum occupies was formerly the estate of Sir Robert Kennedy and was acquired in 1961. The museum opened to the public for the first time three years later in 1964.

=== Exhibits ===
The Folk Museum houses a variety of old buildings and dwellings which have been collected from various parts of Ireland and rebuilt in the grounds of the museum, brick by brick. The site is devoted to illustrating the rural way of life in the early 20th century, and visitors can stroll through a recreation of the period's countryside complete with farms, cottages, crops, livestock, and visit a typical Ulster town of the time called "Ballycultra", featuring shops, churches, and both terraced and larger housing and a Tea room. Regular activities include open hearth cooking, printing, needlework, and traditional Irish crafts demonstrations. All these new developments have aided UFM in developing a new visitor base and have gained the site international recognition.

The museum is the holder of Northern Ireland's main film, photographic, television and sound archives. The museum holds the BBC Northern Ireland archive of radio and television programmes, and also possesses over 2,000 hours of sound material broadcast between 1972 and 2002 by the Irish language radio station RTÉ Raidió na Gaeltachta, from its studios in Derrybeg, County Donegal. The museum also maintains an archive of Ulster dialects, and a large library containing over 15,000 books and periodicals. The archives and library are open to the public during office hours.

== Transport Museum ==
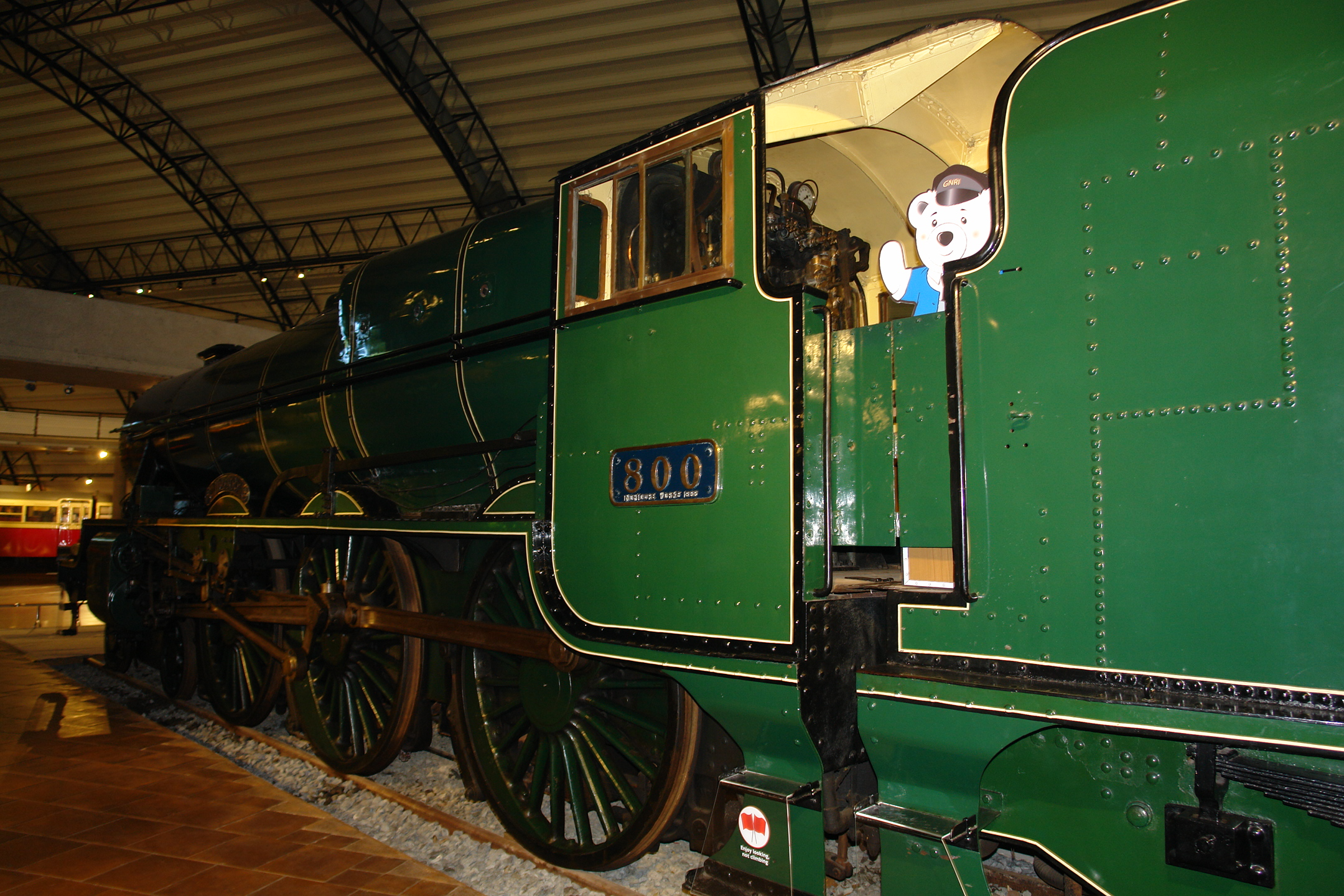
Great Southern Railways No. 800 Maeḋḃ, 2006

=== History ===
The Transport Museum has its origins in Belfast Corporation's preserved collection of historic transport items, which were temporarily exhibited in the 1950s in a former engine shed near Queen's Quay station. This collection was subsequently expanded and moved to new premises on Witham Street, opening on 1 April 1962. In 1967, the Transport Museum was removed from Belfast Corporation ownership when it was merged with the Ulster Folk Museum. An additional 40 acres (16 ha) of land was purchased at Cultra and the first new gallery was opened in May 1976, although most of the collection remained at Witham Street for the time being. In the 1990s, new larger galleries were constructed at Cultra and the rest of the collection was then moved. These were the railway and road galleries, which opened in 1993 and 1996 respectively.

=== Exhibits ===
The Transport Museum houses an extensive transport collection, and endeavours to tell the story of transport in Ireland, from its early history to the modern era. It is the largest railway collection in Ireland.

The Irish Railway Collection tells the story of over 150 years of railway history. Steam locomotives, passenger carriages and goods wagons are combined with extensive railway memorabilia, interactive displays and visitor facilities. One of the collection's main attractions is Great Southern Railways Class 800 locomotive No. 800 Maeḋḃ, one of the three largest and most powerful steam locomotives ever to be built and run in Ireland.

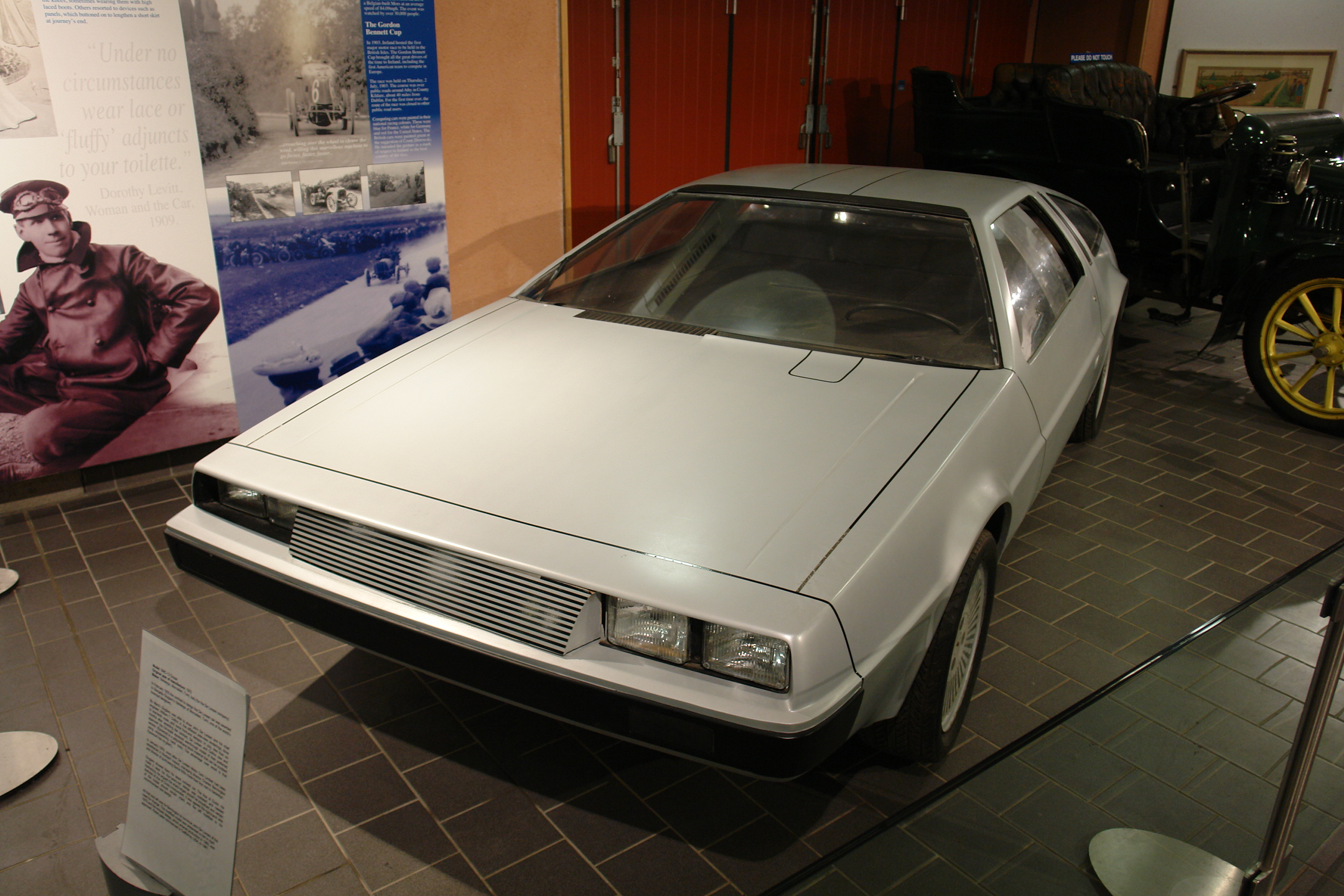
Clay model of the DMC-12 Coupe by Italdesign, Moncalieri, Turin for the DeLorean Motor Company from 1975

The new Road Transport Galleries boast a large collection of vehicles ranging from cycles and motorcycles to trams, buses, and cars. One of its most famous attractions is a DMC DeLorean car, the model made famous by Back to the Future, and manufactured by the DeLorean Motor Company in Belfast. Recent additions to the collection include a full set of Stanley Woods racing memorabilia, and two of his bikes. Also on display is a Rex McCandless vehicle and an early Formula 1 racing car. In October 2023 a collection of 7 racing motorbikes from local racers, including Joey Dunlop, was opened in the Driven gallery of the museum, as examples of the long history of road racing in Northern Ireland.

The museum boasts a permanent Titanic exhibition, documenting the construction, voyage, and eventual sinking of the ill-fated vessel. The ship has long been associated with Northern Ireland, as it was constructed in the Harland & Wolff shipyards, just a few miles from the museum. The newly refurbished Titanic exhibition, tying in with the Folk museum's 'Titanic Trail' is titled TITANICa. Also on the nautical theme, there is the 120 ton steel schooner Result.

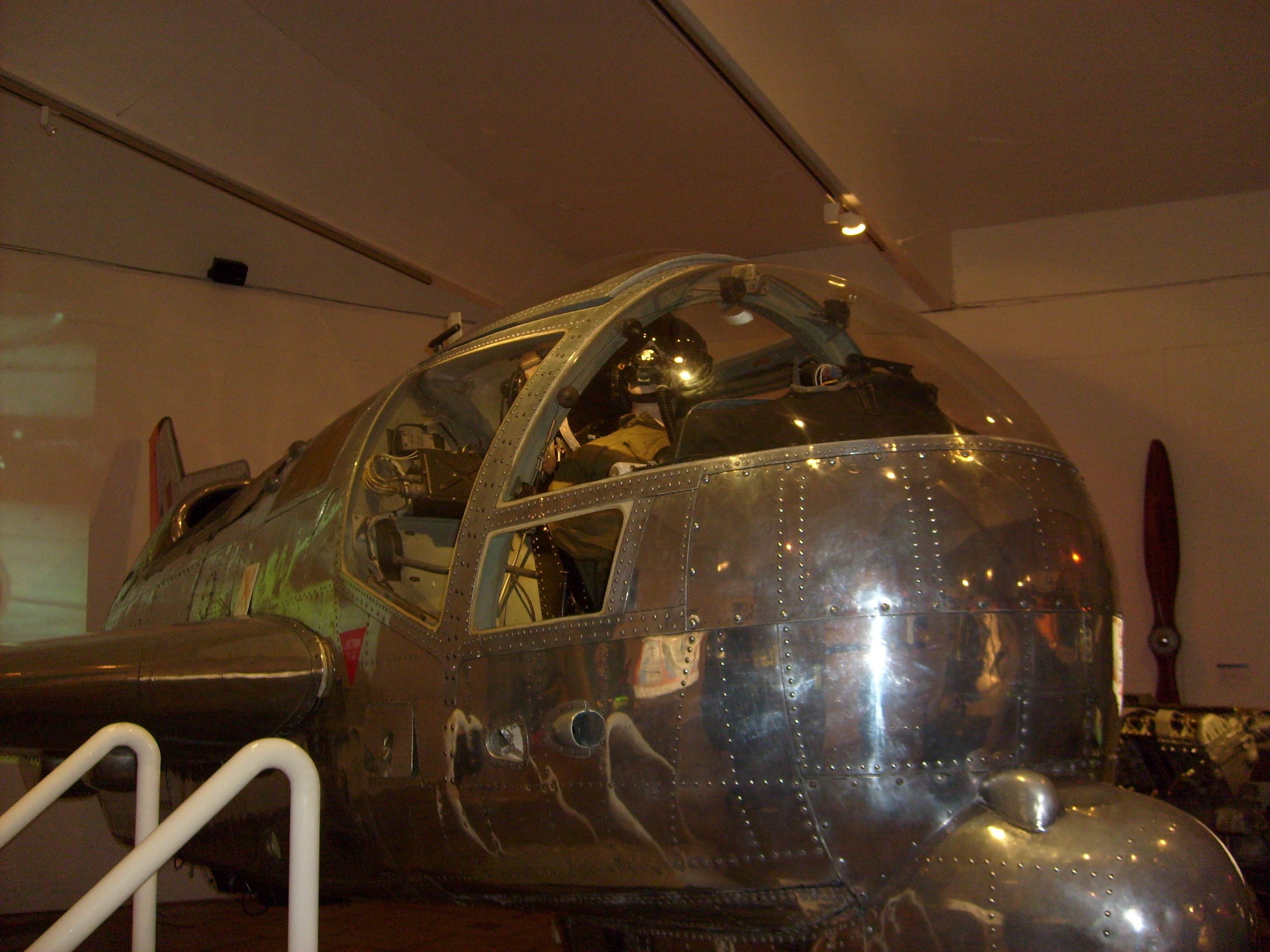
Short SC.1, an experimental vertical take-off aeroplane

The aircraft on display is the Shorts manufactured Short SC.1, an experimental vertical take-off aeroplane, only two of which were ever produced. The example in the museum, XG905, crashed in 1963, ending up upside down and killing its pilot. It was, however, repaired and flown again before eventually being preserved by the museum.

=== Railway and tramway vehicles ===
Number	Type	Build date	Photo	Original operator	Gauge	Notes
48	4-wheeled 3rd-class carriage	1838		DKR	5 ft 3 in (1,600 mm)	Built as 4 ft 8 1/2 in (1,435 mm), converted to 5 ft 3 in (1,600 mm) in 1856.
47	6-wheeled director's saloon	1844		MGWR	5 ft 3 in (1,600 mm)	William Dargan's private saloon.
1	Bogie tricomposite carriage	1882		CDRJC	3 ft (914 mm)	Used as director's saloon when required.
2	4-wheeled bench wagon	1882		Guinness	3 ft (914 mm)	1 of 4 built for giving tours of the brewery. Converted to 3' from 1'10". Being restored in the museum stores. Not on display.
3	4-wheeled bench wagon	1882		Guinness	3 ft (914 mm)	1 of 4 built for giving tours of the brewery. Converted to 3' from 1'10".
381	Horse-drawn tram	1883		GNR	5 ft 3 in (1,600 mm)	Fintona tram.
2	0-4-0T steam tram	1883		Portstewart Tramway	3 ft (914 mm)	Vertical boiler
2	Electric tram	1883		GCT	3 ft (914 mm)	
5	Electric tram	1883		GCT	3 ft (914 mm)	
4	6-wheeled composite carriage	1884		CVBT	3 ft (914 mm)	
2	4-4-0T steam locomotive	1884		CLR	3 ft (914 mm)	Named Kathleen
2	Electric tram	1885		BNT	3 ft (914 mm)	
118	Horse-drawn tram	1885		Belfast Street Tramways Co	4 ft 8 1/2 in (1,435 mm)	
5	Bogie composite carriage	1887		CLR	3 ft (914 mm)	
1	0-6-0ST steam locomotive	1891		LPHC	5 ft 3 in (1,600 mm)	Built by Robert Stephenson and Hawthorns
93	2-4-2T steam locomotive	1895		GNR	5 ft 3 in (1,600 mm)	GNRI Class JT named Sutton
30	4-4-2T steam locomotive	1901		BCDR	5 ft 3 in (1,600 mm)	Last BCDR locomotive in existence
4	Electric tram	1901		GNR	5 ft 3 in (1,600 mm)	Howth tram.
249	Electric tram	1905		BCT	4 ft 9 in (1,448 mm)	
20	0-4-0T steam locomotive	1905		Guinness	1 ft 10 in (559 mm)	In 1882 Samuel Geoghegan, the Guinness brewery's young head engineer, invented and patented a lightweight steam engine with all moving parts high above the dirty floor to fit within a 6 ft (1.8 m) loading gauge.
	Model of haulage wagon			Guinness	5 ft 3 in (1,600 mm)	Samuel Geoghegan also invented a Haulage Wagon by which his patented narrow-gauge locomotives could be used on broad gauge track.
1	Petrol railcar	1905		CDRJC	3 ft (914 mm)	Nicknamed The Pup.
2	0-4-0T steam locomotive	1906		Larne Aluminium Works	3 ft (914 mm)	
1	6-wheeled composite carriage	1909		DNGR	5 ft 3 in (1,600 mm)	Last DNGR vehicle in existence.
2	2-6-4T steam locomotive	1912		CDRJC	3 ft (914 mm)	Named Blanche
246	4-wheeled petrol mechanical	1916		War Department, later sold to Carnuff Quarry of Howden Brothers in Larne and then moved to Collin Glen brickworks in Belfast	2 ft (610 mm)	This was one of 40 bespoke Simplex petrol locos ordered in 1916 by the War Department from the Rail & Tram Car Company of Bedford for use on the trenches railway. In all, the Motor Rail Company supplied 820 locos to the War Department.
74	4-4-0 steam locomotive	1924		NCC	5 ft 3 in (1,600 mm)	NCC Class U2 named Dunluce Castle Built by North British Locomotive Company
E	Railbus	1928		GNR	5 ft 3 in (1,600 mm)	
3	Carriage	1926		CDRJC	3 ft (914 mm)	Former 5 ft 3 in (1,600 mm) railcar from DBST, bought by CDRJC and converted to 3'.
11	Diesel locomotive	1928		CDRJC	3 ft (914 mm)	Named Phoenix. Built as a steam locomotive but converted to diesel in 1932.
357	Electric tram	1930		BCT	4 ft 9 in (1,448 mm)	
10	Diesel railcar	1932		CDRJC	3 ft (914 mm)	The first articlated diesel railcar in Ireland. Ordered in 1932 by the Clogher Valley Railway as CVR railcar No 1 from Walkers of Wigan. To save money, CVR supplied the rear used carriage bogie.
800	4-6-0 steam locomotive	1939	4-6-0 GSR 800	GSR	5 ft 3 in (1,600 mm)	GSR Class 800 which was one of the most powerful steam locomotive to be built for an Irish Railway. Named Maedb.
3127	4-wheeled diesel mechanical	1943		Admiralty Railway, Lisahally, Lough Foyle	2 ft (610 mm)	The pier railway was built in 1942 and the loco delivered in 1943. During WWII, it hauled the covered wagon between land-based stores and ships at the end of the pier.
?	4-wheeled diesel mechanical	1944		?	2 ft (610 mm)	
?	4-wheeled diesel mechanical	1946		Northern Sand & Brick Company. In 1955 sold to the Ministry of Agriculture to work on the construction of the Black Braes Embankment sea defences beside Loch Foyle. Later sold to County Antrim to work on the new Ballyumford power station.	2 ft (610 mm)	This Simplex loco was built by the Motor Rail Company of Bedford to be exhibited at the Royal Dublin Show in 1946. It was later bought by the Northern Sand & Brick Company for its Toome brickworks railway, where it worked until 1955.
35	4-wheeled diesel mechanical	1950		Guinness	2 ft (610 mm)	This loco was one of 12 Planet diesels built for Guinness (beer) by F. C. Hibberd. It hauled side tippers for malt and spent grain, coal and cinders, and flat wagons for barrels up to 1975.
B113	BoBo diesel	1950		CIÉ	5 ft 3 in (1,600 mm)	CIE 113 Class
102	BoBo diesel	1970		NIR	5 ft 3 in (1,600 mm)	NIR 101 Class
?	Rail bike	?		NCC	5 ft 3 in (1,600 mm)	
23642	Brake van	19??		CIÉ	5 ft 3 in (1,600 mm)	
706	Goods van	19??		GSWR	5 ft 3 in (1,600 mm)	
240	Cattle wagon	?		SLNCR	5 ft 3 in (1,600 mm)	Being restored in the museum stores. Not on public display.
?	Flatbed	19??		?	5 ft 3 in (1,600 mm)	Being restored in the museum stores. Not on public display.
?	Coal wagon	?		?	5 ft 3 in (1,600 mm)	Being restored in the museum stores. Not on public display.
136	Open wagon	19??		CDRJC	3 ft (914 mm)	
?	Goods van	19??		?	2 ft (610 mm)	
	4-wheeled mining carts				2 ft 6 in (762 mm)	

== Railway connection for visitors ==
Cultra railway station on the Belfast-Bangor railway line provides connections to Sydenham, Belfast Lanyon Place and Belfast Grand Central in one direction and to Bangor in the other direction.

== See also ==
- List of heritage railways in Northern Ireland
- History of rail transport in Ireland
- History of Ireland (1801–1923)
- Culture of Northern Ireland
- Culture of Ireland
- National Museums NI

=== Other museums ===
- Beamish Museum – County Durham, England
- Black Country Living Museum – Dudley, England
- Avoncroft Museum of Historic Buildings - Bromsgrove, England
- List of transport museums
- Ulster Museum – Belfast
- St Fagans National History Museum – Museum of Welsh Life, Cardiff, Wales.
