= GNRI Class JT =

Great Northern Railway of Ireland 2-4-2T tank locomotive

GNR(I) class JT
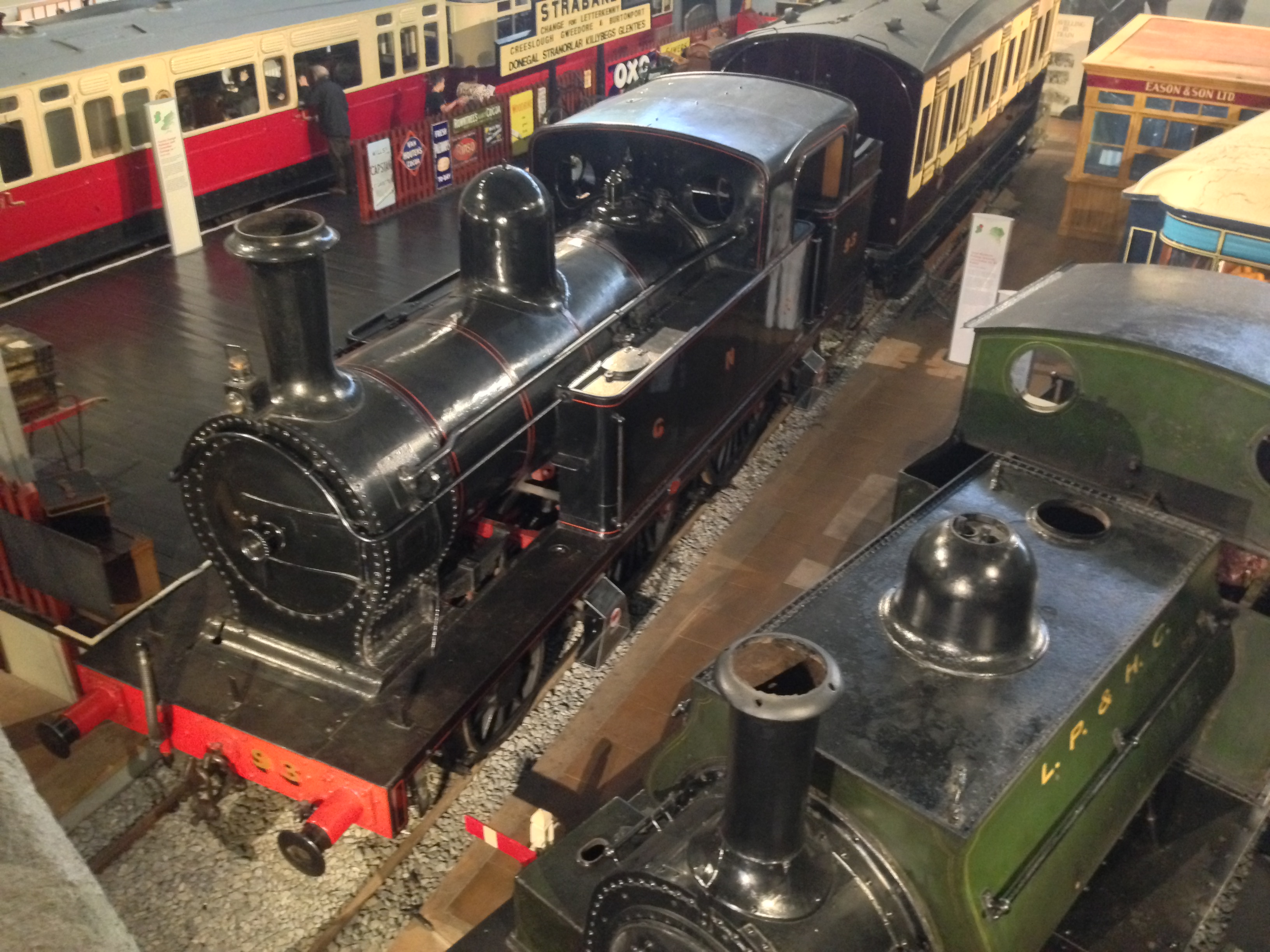
- No. 93 at the Ulster Folk and Transport Museum
Type and origin
- Power type: Steam
- Designer: J. C. Park
- Builder: Dundalk Works
- Build date: 1895–1902
- Total produced: 6
Specifications
- Configuration
  - Whyte: 2-4-2T
  - UIC: 1′B1 n2t
- Gauge: 5 ft 3 in (1,600 mm)
- Driver dia.: 5 ft 7 in (1,702 mm)
- Boiler pressure: 140–175 psi (0.97–1.21 MPa)
- Cylinders: Two, inside
- Cylinder size: 16–17 in (406–432 mm) bore 22 in (559 mm) stroke
Career
- Operators: GNR(I) → CIÉ
- Class: GNR(I): JT
- Numbers: 90, 93, 94, 95, 13 (→91), 14 (→92)
- Withdrawn: 1955–1963
- Preserved: No. 93
- Disposition: One preserved, remainder scrapped

The Great Northern Railway (Ireland) JT class comprised six 2-4-2T locomotives, all built between 1895 and 1902 at their Dundalk Works. These were of a J. C. Park design, but introduced following his death. They were used on Dublin suburban services; then on branch lines, including operation of the Dundalk, Newry and Greenore Railway when taken over in 1933. Most were withdrawn shortly after 1955 between 1955 and 1957 but one remained passed to Córas Iompair Éireann (CIÉ) and remained in service until 1963.

== History ==
The JT class comprised six 2-4-2T locomotives, all built between 1895 and 1902 at their Dundalk Works. These were of a J. C. Park design, but introduced following his death. They were used on Dublin suburban services; then on branch lines, including operation of the Dundalk, Newry and Greenore Railway when taken over in 1933. Most were withdrawn between 1955 and 1957, but No. 91 (ex No. 13 Tulip) passed to Córas Iompair Éireann (CIÉ), and lasted until 1963.

=== Fleet details ===
They were subject to enlargement as batches were introduced, and rebuilt between 1917 and 1925 with improved 4-foot-2-inch (1.27 m) boilers and standard 16.5-by-22-inch (420 mm × 560 mm) cylinders.

Table of locomotives
GNRI No.	Name	Manufacturer	Serial number	Date made	Boiler pressure	Cylinder bore	Date withdrawn	Notes
93	Sutton	Dundalk Works	16	1895	140 psi	16 in (406 mm)	1955	
94	Howth	Dundalk Works	17	1896	140 psi	16 in (406 mm)	1956	
90	Aster	Dundalk Works	18	1898	160 psi	17 in (432 mm)	1957	
95	Crocus	Dundalk Works	20	1898	160 psi	16 1/2 in (419 mm)	1955	
13	Tulip	Dundalk Works	23	1902	175 psi	17 in (432 mm)	1963	Renumbered 91 in 1920; to CIÉ 91N
14	Viola	Dundalk Works	24	1902	175 psi	17 in (432 mm)	1956	Renumbered 92 in 1920

=== Preservation ===
One member of the class, No. 93 is preserved at the Ulster Folk and Transport Museum at Cultra, County Down.
