= Bessbrook and Newry Tramway =

Tramway in Northern Ireland

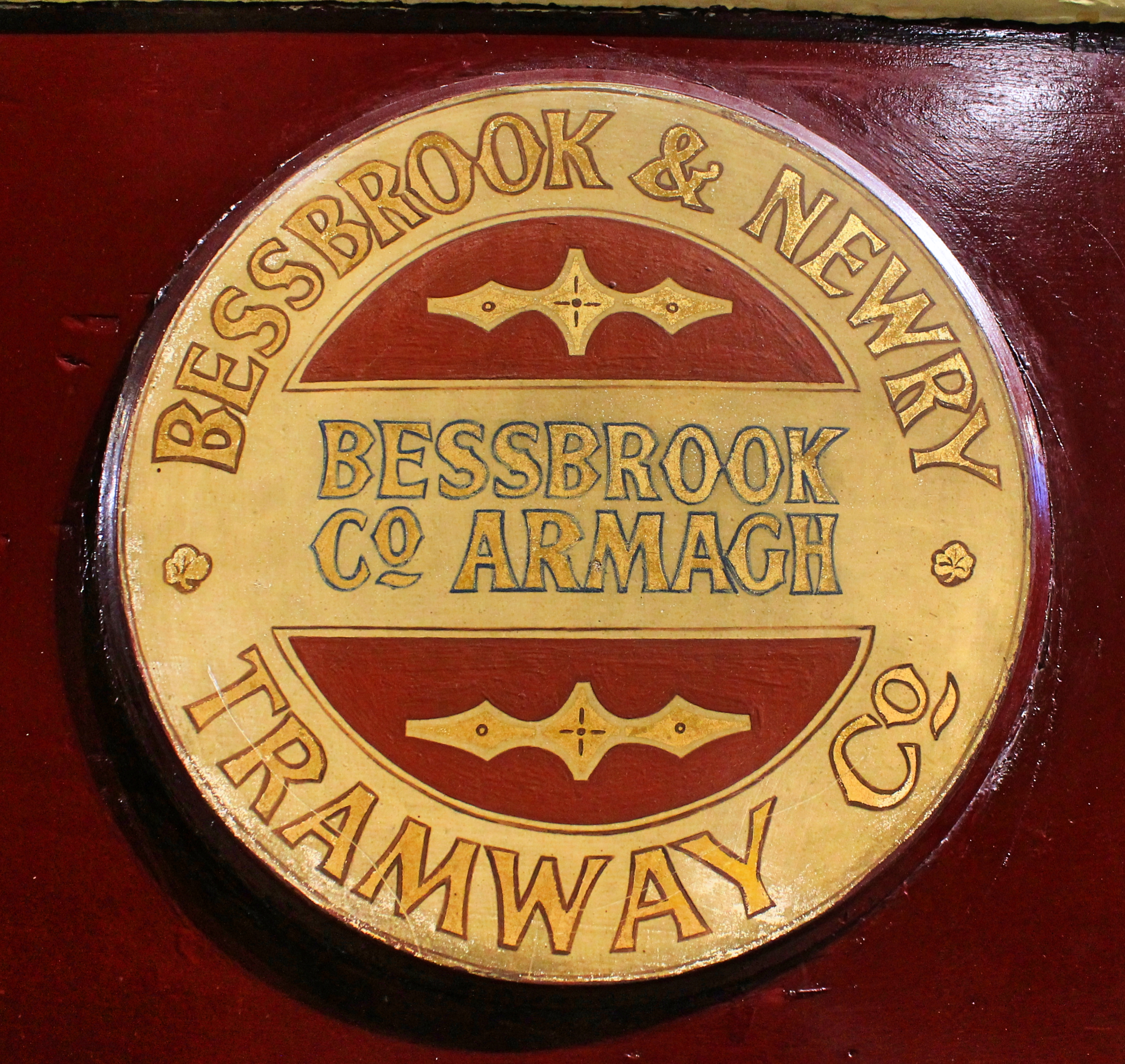

Operation
- Locale: Bessbrook, Newry
- Open: 1 October 1885
- Close: 10 January 1948
- Status: Closed

Infrastructure
- Track gauge: 3 ft (914 mm)
- Propulsion system: Electric

Statistics
- Route length: 3.03 miles (4.88 km)
Overview

The Bessbrook and Newry Tramway operated a 3 ft (914 mm) narrow gauge, hydro-electrically powered tramway transporting passengers and freight between Bessbrook and Newry in Northern Ireland between 1885 and 1948.

== History ==
=== Construction and infrastructure ===
Construction of the Bessbrook and Newry Tramway began in 1883, and the enterprise was incorporated in 1884, after the Tramways and Public Companies (Ireland) Act 1883 (46 & 47 Vict. c. 43) came into effect. It was built primarily on the own land of its owners, the Richardsons, and was intended to carry workers and freight from the Great Northern Railway (Ireland) GNR(I), in Newry to the family's flax mill in Bessbrook. In July 1884 Edward Hopkinson was contacted by the company, the Bessbrook Spinning Company to undertake the installation operation of electric traction for the line - the terms were that Hopkinson would provide locomotive power to operating ten trains each way every day, carrying 100 tons of freight a day, and with a capacity to haul 200 tons a day, with the locomotives able to pull 18 tons gross at 6 mph in addition to locomotive and passengers in the uphill direction (12 tons at 9 mph). Additionally Hopkinson was to run the line on a six-month trial, showing that the cost of operation was not more than that of steam traction. The work began in November 1884, with the line opening in October 1885; the terms of the trial were met in April 1886.

The line started at the Edward Street terminus of the Newry branch of the GNR(I), it passed under the viaduct of the GNR(I) line (see Craigmore Viaduct.) before stations at Craigmore and Millvale, the line terminated at Bessbrook, after a length of 3 miles 2.4 chains (3.03 miles, 4.88 km). The 3 ft (914 mm) line ascended steadily from Newry to Beesbook, with an average incline of 1 in 86, and a maximum of 1 in 50. Reversing loops were constructed at both terminuses.

The line's electricity generating station was at Millvale, using hydro-electric power from the Camlough river. The site had a 28 ft (8.5 m) water drop available, and a flow of at least 3,000,000 imp gal (14,000 m^{3}) per day. The water turbine was a double bucket inward-flow vortex wheel design (manufactured by MacAdam Brothers, Belfast.), specified to generate 62 hp (46 kW) at 290 rpm with a flow of 1,504 cu ft (42.6 m^{3}) per minute, connected to the generator shed by a horizontal shaft. The electrical generators were two Edison-Hopkinson types supplied by Mather and Platt, each specified at 250 V, 72 A at 1000 rpm.

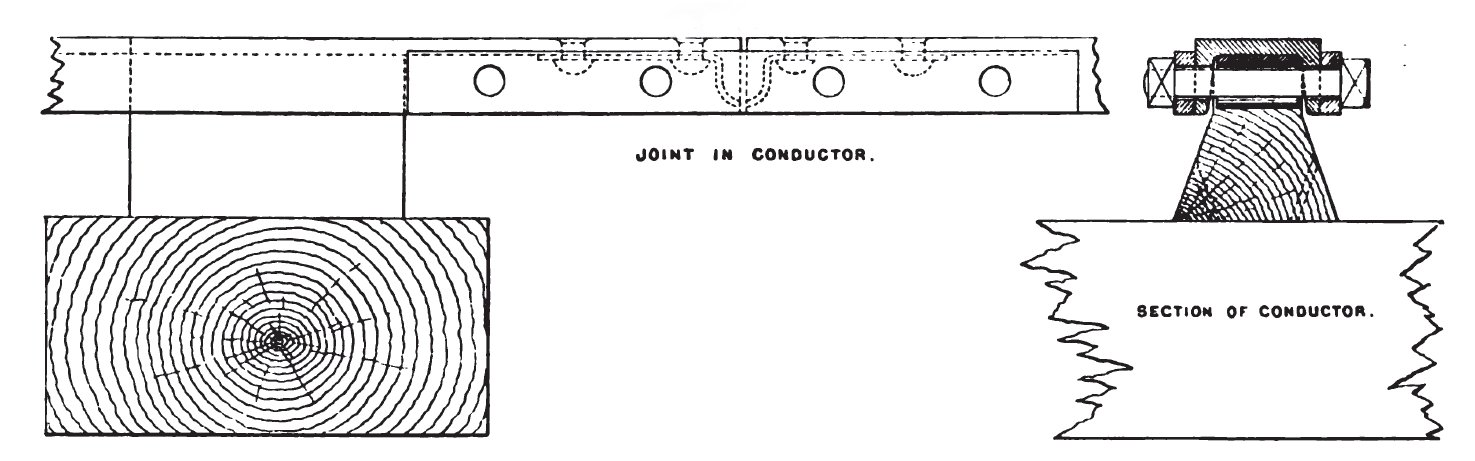
Centre conductor cross sections left: transverse view, right: longitudinal view

The line was electrified with a central rail sectional steel conductor; the sections were connected by copper strips, U-shaped to allow expansion of the joints. The rails were used as return conductors, also connected by copper strips at rail joints. The total resistance was approximately 0.25 ohms per mile. The centre track conductor was not laid at twelve level crossings; (Note: Herny Barcroft, of the Bessbrook Spinning company also designed an unstaffed hydraulically-operated level crossing gate, triggered by an approaching train knocking a level connected by wire rope to a three way valve.) electrical connectivity was maintained by having a collector on the front and rear of the locomotive-carriages, the distance between which was greater than the insulated section. Another level crossing, made at a slew angle, 150 ft (46 m) long used an overhead copper wire, 15 ft (4.6 m) high, connecting to a cast iron collector on the roof of the locomotive. (Note: The collector was later replaced with a bow collector.) After a lightning strike resulted in several electrocutions, and caused blown fuses at the generator the rails were connected to earth at several points.

=== Rolling stock ===
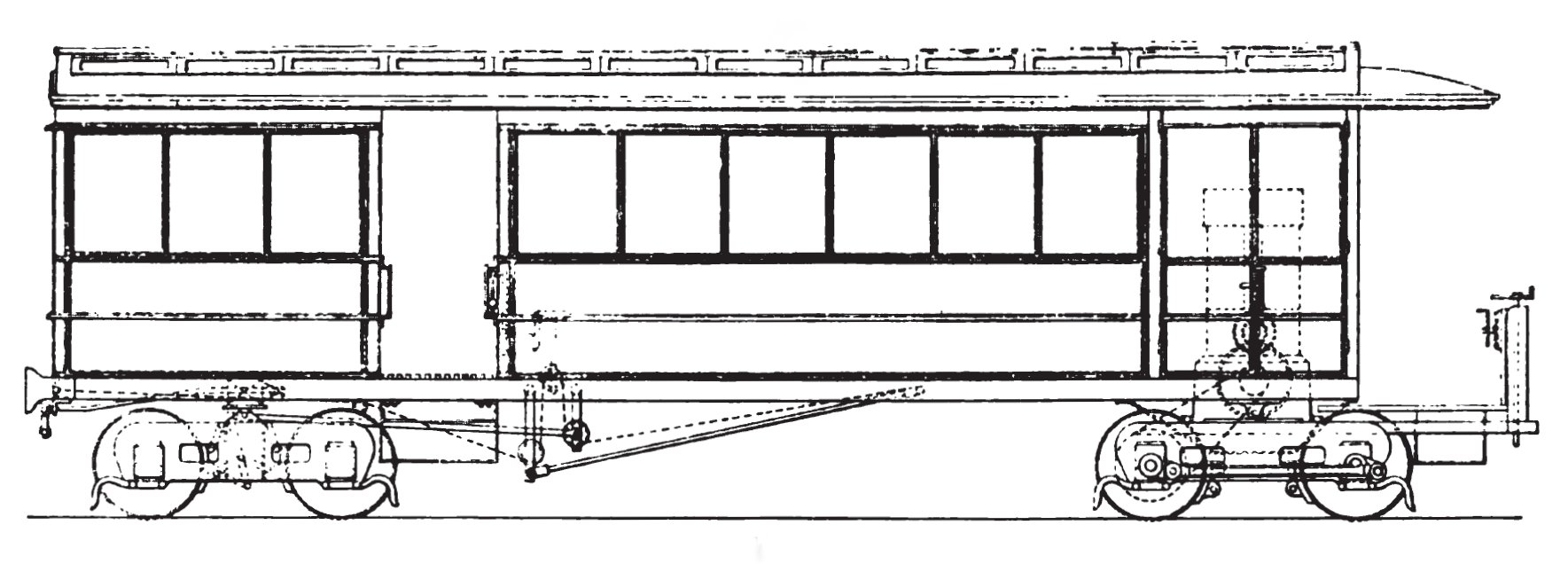
Motor-carriage

Tractive power was provided by two motor-carriages, manufactured by the Ashbury Carriage Company (Manchester), one 33 ft (10 m) and 21 ft 8 in (6.60 m), with a motor and passenger compartments, the longer vehicle had first and second class seating, the shorter only second class. The longer locomotive-car had provision for 24 passengers in 2nd class and 10 in first class accommodation. A 33 ft bogie 5.5 ton passenger carriage was also acquired from the Starbuck Company (Birkenhead), with seating for 44.

Each vehicle was a four axle two bogie design with the front bogie driven by a bogie mounted motor (UIC type: 2'B'), all four wheels were braked by a screw brake operated from the driving position, and the rear bogie wheels were also braked by a chain brake accessible to the conductor. There was a single open driving platform at one end of the vehicle. The total weight of the longer motor-carriage was 8.25 long tons (8,380 kg). The motors were Edison-Hopkinson designs, connected by a chain drive mechanism to the wheels, with the bogie axles were coupled by connecting rods. The motor's rated power was 20 hp (15 kW), with this figure being exceeded in practice. Starting control was achieved using series resistances.

Initially trains were composed of a locomotive-carriage with four wagons; the train could be increased to six wagons, or a second passenger carriage hauled - performance was 6 to 7 mph (9.7 to 11.3 km/h) with a load of 30 long tons (30,000 kg) on a 1 in 50 gradient.

The tramway also introduced a system to allow road-worthy flangeless wheeled wagons on the line, first proposed by Alfred Holt, engineer, and brought into practice by Henry Barcroft of the Bessbrook spinning Co.; the system used a section set of rails, outside the main and slightly lower (7/8 inch), on which the flangeless wheels ran, using the inner main rails as guides.

=== Operations ===
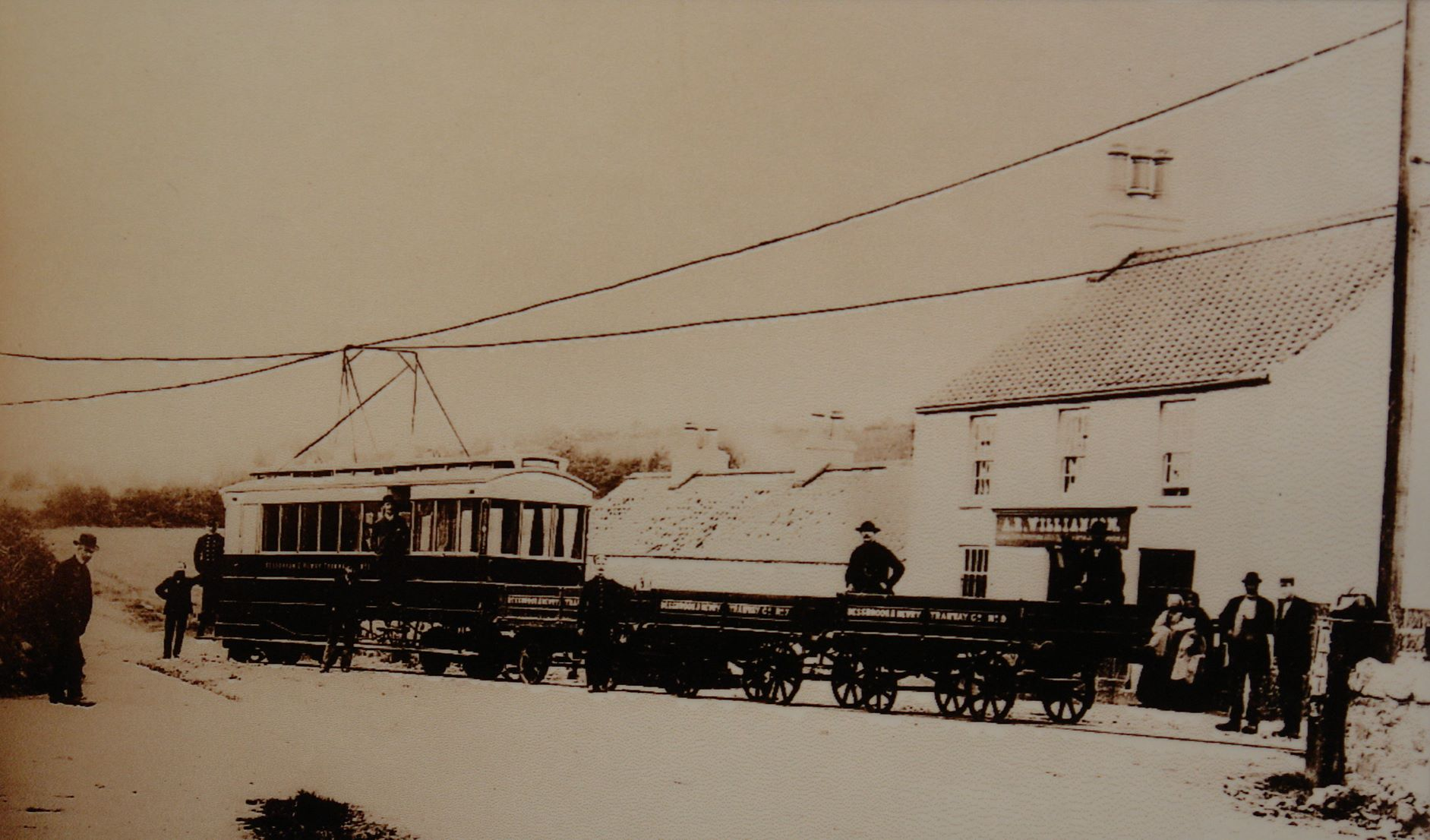
Train of goods wagons

The line was operated with two locomotive-carriages, a trailer carriage, and over 20 road-rail wagons. One of the carriage vehicles was replaced in 1921, and further trailer acquired from the Dublin and Lucan Steam Tramway in 1928. At its peak it carried 100,000 passengers and ran 21,000 mi (34,000 km) per year.

The line closed in 1948.

== Legacy ==
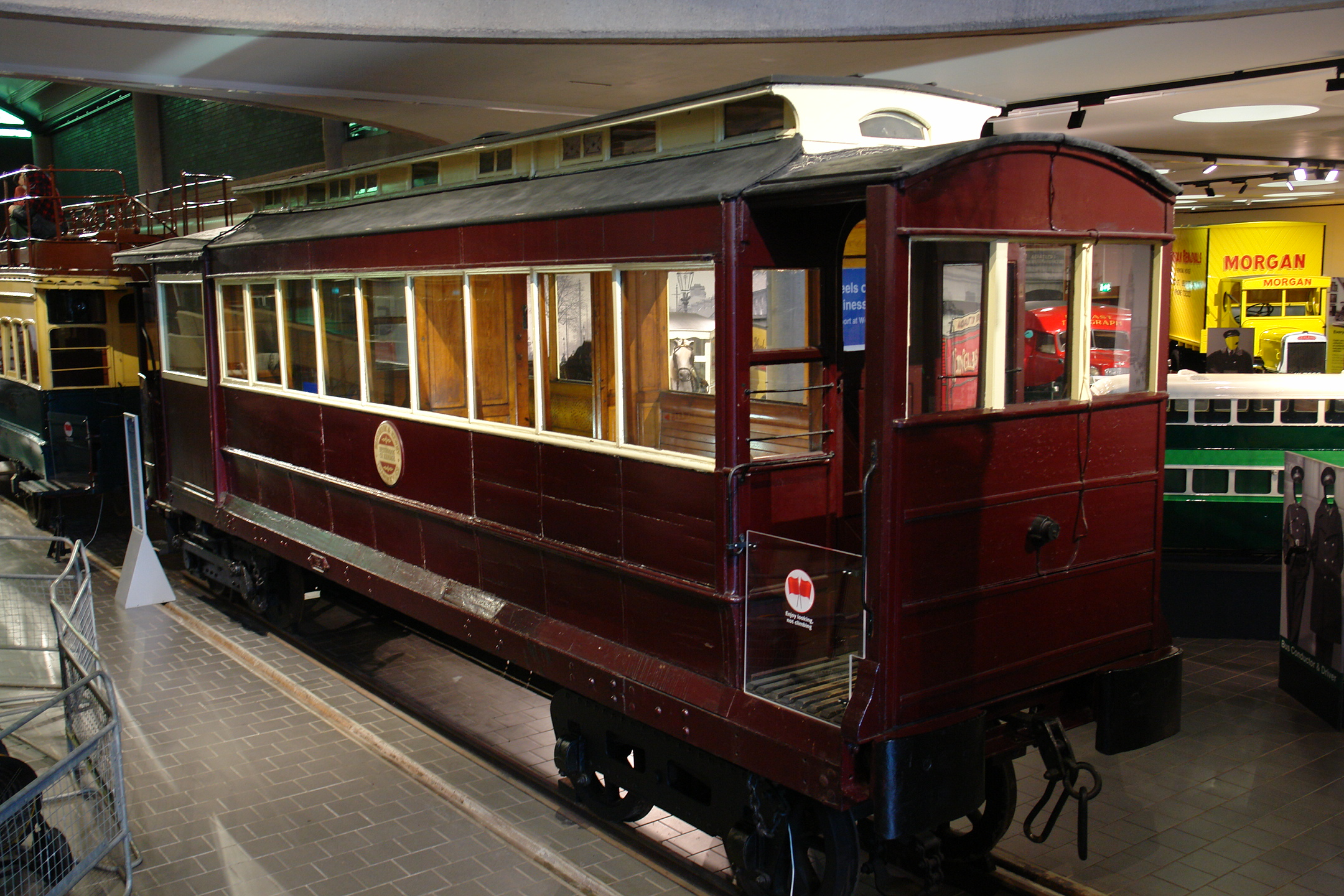
Preserved tram at the Ulster Folk & Transport Museum

On the closure of the tramway, tram engine No 2 went back to Mather and Platt in Manchester, who refurbished it as a cricket hut at Park Works. In 1955 they presented it to Belfast Corporation for inclusion in the Transport Museum. It is now on view at the Ulster Folk and Transport Museum, Cultra. Another carriage, which has lain derelict in a field since the line closed, was rescued in December 2014 and is under restoration by the Southern Regional College. When completed, it will go on display near Newry railway station.

The water turbine building has been demolished, the Bessbrook terminal building is still extant.

Hopkinson's success led to him later being employed by the City and South London Railway, which used Edison-Hopkinson dynamos, and Hopkinson designed electric locomotives.
