= Aughnacloy College =

Secondary school in Northern Ireland

Location
- 23 Carnteel Road; Aughnacloy; County Tyrone, BT69 6DX; Northern Ireland; 54.419°N 6.965°W

Information
- Established: 1963
- Colours: Red, White and Navy

Aughnacloy College is a secondary school in Aughnacloy, County Tyrone, Northern Ireland. It is in the Southern Education and Library Board area. It opened in 1963.

In 2024, two students from the school won the top prize in the ABP Angus Youth Challenge for their project on sustainable farming.
