= Millvale, Bessbrook =

Village in County Armagh, Northern Ireland

Millvale is a settlement between Bessbrook and Newry in County Armagh, Northern Ireland. It is within the townland of Cloghreagh.

The area derives its name from the large number of mills, mainly linen, that were set up in the early 19th century. The Camlough River here provided a quick source of power through water wheels. Most of these have been now demolished, the latest being Baillies Foundry, which was a six-storey granite building, originally constructed in 1800 or so. This fell derelict in the late 1960s. Up to its recent demolition it still contained the rusting ruins of all its lathes and machinery.
