= Aughnacloy, County Tyrone =

Village in County Tyrone, Northern Ireland

Coordinates: 54.413511°N 6.974773°W

Aughnacloy: Irish: Achadh na Cloiche
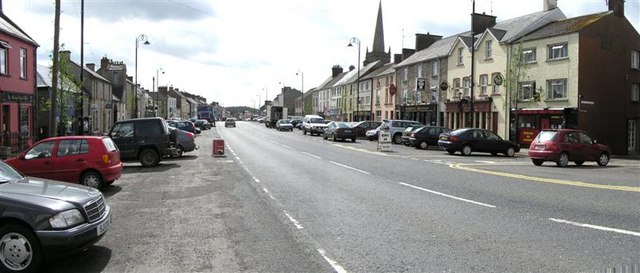
- Moore Street, the main thoroughfare through Aughnacloy, in 2006

- Location within Northern Ireland
- Population: 1,162 (2021 census)
- Irish grid reference: H665521
  - Belfast: 52 mi (84 km)
- District: Mid Ulster District Council
- County: County Tyrone
- Country: Northern Ireland
- Sovereign state: United Kingdom
- Post town: AUGHNACLOY
- Postcode district: BT69
- Dialling code: 028
- UK Parliament: Fermanagh & South Tyrone
- NI Assembly: Fermanagh & South Tyrone

Aughnacloy, sometimes spelt Auchnacloy (Irish: Achadh na Cloiche, meaning 'field of the stone'), is a village in County Tyrone, Northern Ireland. Close to the border with County Monaghan in the Republic of Ireland, the village is about 20 km southwest of Dungannon, and 7 km southeast of Ballygawley. It is situated in the historic barony of Dungannon Lower and the civil parish of Carnteel. In the 2021 census it had a population of 1,162.

== History ==
Much of the town was built in the 18th century by Acheson Moore, the local landlord. Because he backed the Jacobite cause, he planted his estate in the shape of a thistle and planned out the town on the edge of it. Unable to rename it "Mooretown", he had to settle for naming the main street "Moore Street", and the side streets Sydney, Lettice, and Henrietta (now Ravella Road), after his three wives. The thistle is still visible from the air.

Aughnacloy served as an important staging post on the road to Derry. However, lacking large-scale industry, it started to wane in the late 19th century.

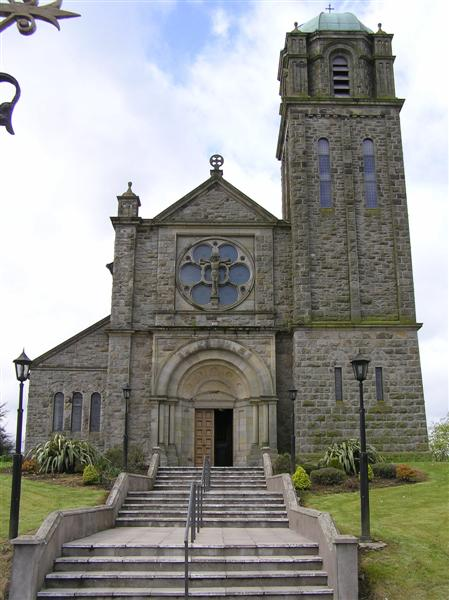
Aughnacloy Catholic church

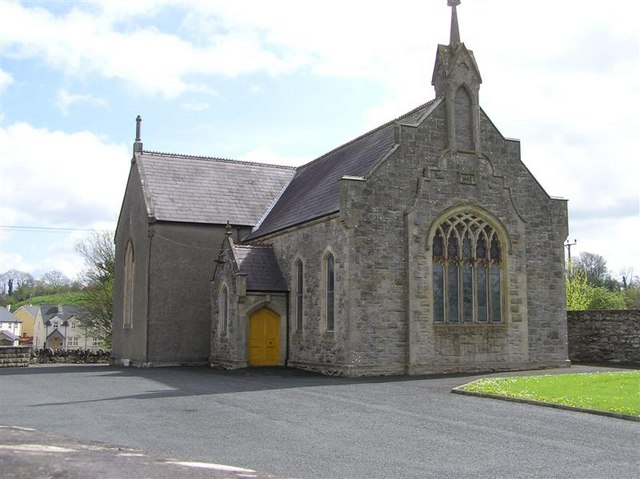
Aughnacloy Presbyterian church

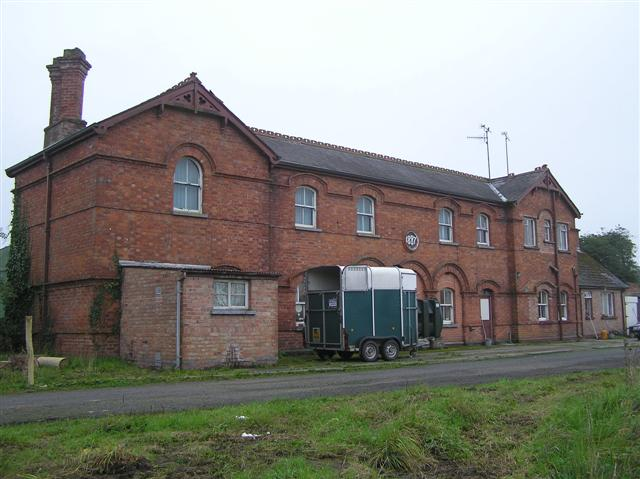
The old railway station

=== The Troubles ===
In 1988, Aidan McAnespie, a Catholic civilian, was killed by a bullet from a general purpose machine-gun held by a British Army soldier at Aughnacloy. Twenty years later (June 2008), the PSNI Historical Enquiries Team published its findings on the case in a report. The report stated that the soldier's claim that his wet hands caused an accidental discharge was the "least likely version" of what happened.

== Demographics ==
=== 2011 census ===
At the time of the 2011 census (27 March 2011), Aughnacloy had a population of 1,045, accounting for 0.06% of the total NI population. Of those 1,045 people:

- 99.14% were from the white (including Irish Traveller) ethnic group
- 56.84% belong to or were brought up in the Catholic religion and 41.34% belong to or were brought up in a 'Protestant and Other Christian (including Christian related)' religion
- 35.41% indicated that they had a British national identity, 30.62% had an Irish national identity and 22.39% had a Northern Irish national identity*.
- 14.81% had some knowledge of Irish
- 5.17% had some knowledge of Ulster-Scots
- 15.62% did not have English as their first language

== Transport ==
Aughnacloy had its own railway station on the Clogher Valley Railway (CVR) from 2 May 1887 to 1 January 1942. The CVR's headquarters and locomotive workshop was also at Aughnacloy. Current proposals to upgrade the A5 road through the village to a dual carriageway and build a bypass have met with a mixed reaction in the town, with many traders and farmers strongly opposed.

The town is served by Bus Eireann Expressway Route 32, connecting the town to both Dublin and Letterkenny.

== Education ==
Primary schools in the area include Aughnacloy Primary School and St. Mary's Primary School.

Aughnacloy College, formerly known as Aughnacloy Secondary School and Aughnacloy High School, opened in 1963. The main building of this secondary school was designed by John MacGeagh. It occupies a rural site on the outskirts of Aughancloy, serving a catchment area stretching along the Blackwater valley including Caledon, Greystone, Innismagh, Ballygawley, Lisdoart and Favour Royal.

== Sport ==
The local Gaelic Athletic Association (GAA) club is Aghaloo O'Neills.

Aughnacloy Golf Club, one of the founder clubs of the Golfing Union of Ireland in 1890, was reformed in 1994 and is located in Lissenderry just outside the village.

== See also ==
- Market houses in Northern Ireland

== Sources ==
- Dungannon & South Tyrone Area Plan 2010
