= Murder of the Quinn brothers =

1998 terrorist attack in Ballymoney, Northern Ireland

Coordinates: 55.069°N 6.491°W

- Part of the Troubles
- The Quinn brothers. Left to right: Jason, Mark, Richard.
- Location: Ballymoney, County Antrim, Northern Ireland
- Date: 12 July 1998
- Attack type: Firebombing
- Deaths: 3 children
- Injuries: 3 adults
- Perpetrator: Ulster Volunteer Force
- Convicted: Garfield Gilmour

On 12 July 1998, brothers Jason (aged eight), Mark (aged nine), and Richard (aged 10) were murdered by the Ulster Volunteer Force (UVF) in a firebomb attack on their home in Ballymoney, County Antrim, Northern Ireland. The sectarian attack was committed during widespread loyalist violence linked to the Drumcree stand-off, during "The Troubles". Loyalists were angered that the Protestant Orange Order was being prevented from marching through a Catholic neighbourhood in Portadown. The boys were from a Catholic family and lived with their mother in a mainly Protestant estate. Catholic families in the estate were sent death threats in the days before the attack. Police linked the attack to the Drumcree protests, and the murders led to widespread calls for the Orange Order to end their stand-off. Although the protests and violence dwindled following the murders, the Orangemen vowed to continue protesting.

Garfield Gilmour was initially found guilty of murdering the three boys after admitting he had driven three men to the house who had committed the fatal petrol-bombing. Both the police and the judge, Lord Justice McCollum, said the attack was "clearly sectarian", and the judge described Gilmour as a "resourceful liar". Gilmour was sentenced to life imprisonment for murder, but the conviction was reduced to manslaughter on appeal and the sentence was reduced. Although Gilmour named the three alleged killers, they were never charged due to a lack of evidence.

== Background ==
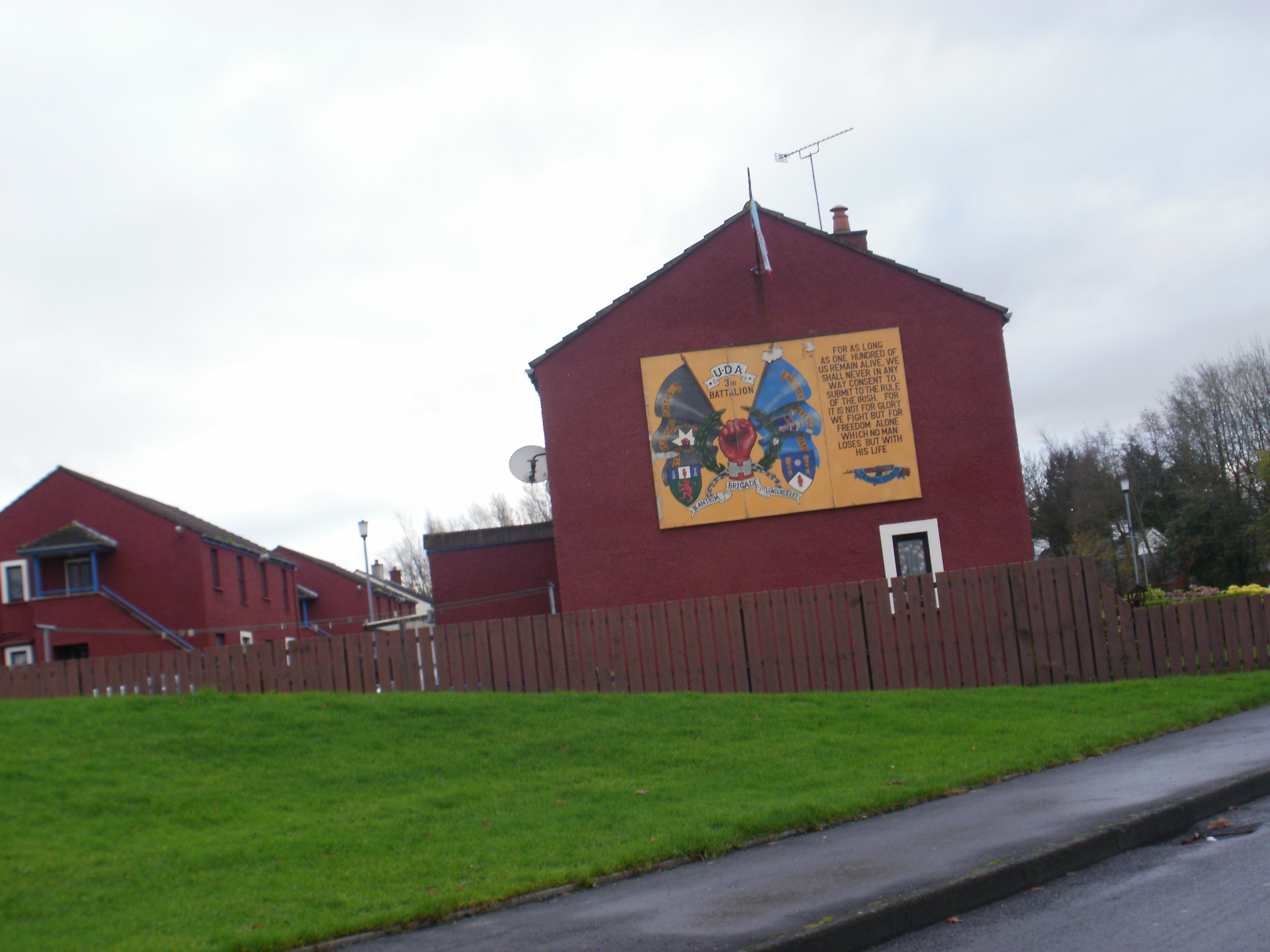
A loyalist mural in Carnany

The Quinn family, consisting of mother Chrissie and sons Jason (aged eight), Mark (aged nine), and Richard (aged 10), lived in the Carnany estate in the predominantly Protestant town of Ballymoney. The family was of a mixed religious background. Chrissie was Roman Catholic from a mixed background, and the boys' father, Jim Dillon, was Catholic. After separating from her husband, Chrissie raised the boys as Protestant to blend in with their neighbours and "to avoid the hassle". She lived with her Protestant partner, Raymond Craig, in Carnany, which had only a few Catholic residents and was mostly Protestant, reflecting the religious make-up of Ballymoney itself. The boys attended a local state school and, on the evening before their deaths, had been helping to build the estate's Eleventh Night loyalist bonfire. Various members of Chrissie's family had lived in Carnany, but due to several incidents only Chrissie and her sons remained. The family had been living in the home, previously occupied by the boys' aunt, for only six days before the attack.

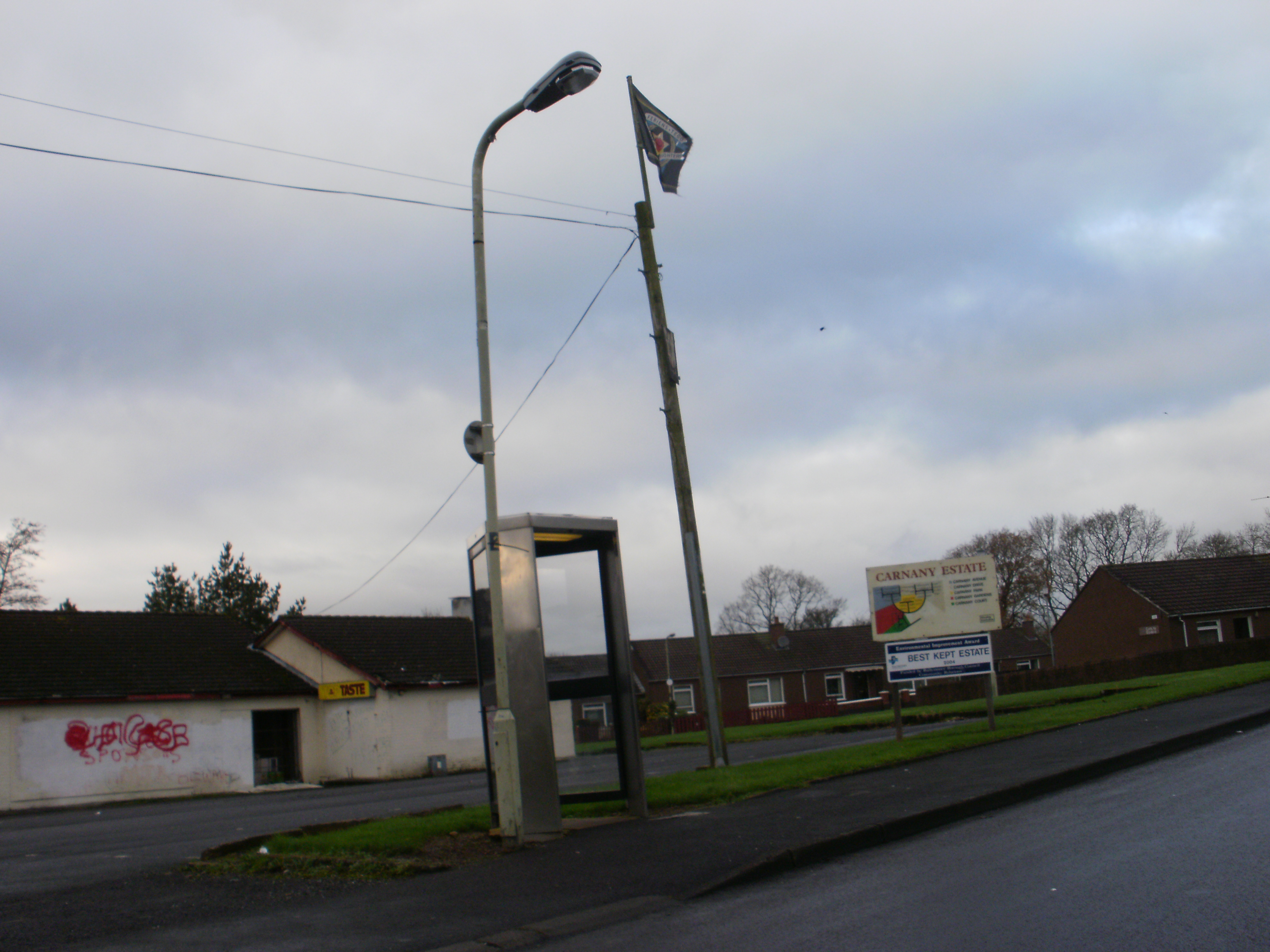
The entrance to Carnany

The killings took place at the height of the Drumcree stand-off over the Orange Order march in Portadown, which created a tense atmosphere in towns across Northern Ireland. The Orange Order was being prevented from marching through a Catholic neighbourhood of the town. In Ballymoney the previous year, an off-duty Royal Ulster Constabulary (RUC) officer, Gregory Taylor, had been beaten to death by a group of loyalist bandsmen. The loyalists were angered that Protestant marches had been banned from the nearby Catholic village of Dunloy.

In the weeks before the attack, Chrissie had expressed fear that she was not welcome in the area and that the family home might be attacked by loyalists. The Ballymoney Times reported a story the week of the deaths, stating that a resident of the Carnany estate had called in and was concerned that something serious might happen "unless Catholic residents were left alone". Shortly before the attack, five Catholic families living in the estate had received UVF cards with the warning "get out now" and a letter containing a 9mm bullet. A few days before the attack, loyalists had established an illegal roadblock at the entrance to the estate in support of the Orange Order protest at Drumcree, and police officers had been attacked with petrol bombs.

== Attack ==
The attack occurred at around 4:20 am in the morning. The three boys were asleep in the house along with their mother Chrissie, her partner Raymond Craig, and a teenage friend, Christine Archibald. The boys' older brother, Lee (aged 12), was staying with his grandmother. Members of the Ulster Volunteer Force (UVF), a loyalist paramilitary organisation, arrived at the house in a car and threw a petrol bomb through a window at the back of the house. The device had been made from a whiskey bottle.

The sounds of the boys' shouting woke their mother, who found her bedroom full of smoke. She said: "I reached their room, but I couldn't find them and went to the window and started screaming for help". Chrissie was told to jump from the first floor window, thinking the boys had escaped, and she was taken to an ambulance. Raymond "climbed on to a back porch and cut his hand badly as he smashed a window in an attempt to rescue the boys".

A neighbour said "I went outside to see Richard Quinn at the window. He said he was getting hot. He said he was frightened and he said his feet were burning. I asked him could he get out and he said he couldn't". The adults escaped with injuries. Chrissie suffered smoke inhalation and burns.

Two of the brothers' bodies were found in their mother's bedroom and the third in his own bedroom. The boys had tried to find their way to their mother.

== Reaction ==
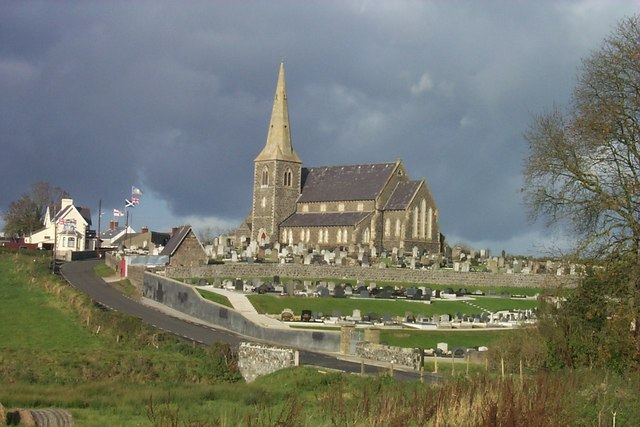
Drumcree in 2001

The Chief Constable of the Royal Ulster Constabulary (RUC), Ronnie Flanagan, described the killings as "brutal sectarian murders" and linked them to the violent protests surrounding the Drumcree stand-off. Police said the attack was one of 137 attacks on Catholic homes or "mixed" homes during the week of violence.

Reverend William Bingham, the Orange Order's Grand Chaplain for County Armagh and one of the lead figures in the Drumcree dispute, said:

"After last night's atrocious act, a walk down the Garvaghy Road by the Orange Order would be a very hollow victory, because it would be in the shadow of three coffins of little boys who wouldn't even know what the Orange Order is about. ... Last night there was the evidence that things have got out of control ... And the great fear is that things will get worse and that more children's lives will be lost. ... No road is worth a life".

David Trimble, the First Minister of Northern Ireland and an Orangeman, called for the Portadown Orangemen to end their stand-off at Drumcree. He said "those responsible for the murders have used those protests as an excuse for an appalling week of barbarity. The only way the Portadown brethren can clearly distance themselves from these murders and show to the world that they repudiate them is now to leave the hill at Drumcree".

The leadership of the Church of Ireland condemned the "vile murders" and demanded the Portadown Orangemen "end their occupation of Church property at Drumcree forthwith".

Although the number of protesters at Drumcree dropped considerably, the Portadown Orange lodges voted unanimously to continue their stand-off and argued that there was no link between their protest and the violence. David Jones, spokesman for the Portadown Orangemen, accused the security forces of colluding to launch the petrol bomb attack to discredit the Orangemen. Days before the attack, Jones had warned Prime Minister Tony Blair that 12 July could be his "Bloody Sunday".

The MP for Ballymoney, Democratic Unionist Party (DUP) leader Ian Paisley, visited the site of the attack and described the killings as "diabolical" and "repugnant". However, in an interview with ITN he stated that "The IRA have carried out worse murders than we had in Ballymoney, over and over again. No one said to them to call off their crimes".

British Prime Minister Tony Blair denounced the attack as "an act of barbarism". U.S. President Bill Clinton extended the condolences of the American people to the Quinn family, New York City mayor Rudy Giuliani extended sympathy to the family from the city of New York, and Massachusetts Senator Ted Kennedy condemned the killings, stating "the Orange Order must recognize that its refusal to abide by the decision of the Parades Commission led to the murder of the Quinn boys".

Representatives of other groups from all sides of the constitutional issue in Northern Ireland also condemned the killings. The then Chelsea F.C. chairman, Ken Bates, offered a £100,000 reward for information leading to a conviction for the attackers. Irish Taoiseach Bertie Ahern attended a memorial mass in Dublin for the children.

At the brothers' Requiem Mass, the bishop of the Roman Catholic Diocese of Down and Connor, Dr. Walsh observed:

"For all too long the airwaves and the printed page have been saturated with noises – strident, harsh, discordant noises – carrying words of hatred, of incitement, of recrimination, words not found in the vocabulary of Christianity. But the time for words is over. It's now time for silence, a silence in which we will hear the voice of God".

The Progressive Unionist Party, which has political links to the UVF, made no comment that the UVF was implicated in the attack.

== Aftermath ==
After being released from hospital, Chrissie returned to her mother's home in Rasharkin, where the boys' wake was held. During the wake, hundreds Orangemen and bands marched past the house as part of a yearly parade. Loyalist bands defied police requests not to play music while marching past the house, where the three boys' bodies lay in white coffins. Their grandmother said, "There's not too many grieving here. There's a parade out there".

The boys were buried in St Mary's cemetery in Rasharkin after requiem Mass. Thousands of both Catholics and Protestants attended the funeral.

In April 1999, the boys' former home in Carnany Park was demolished and replaced with a children's play park as a memorial.

== Conviction of Garfield Gilmour ==
Garfield Gilmour, a local loyalist, was arrested soon after the killings and charged with three counts of murder. He was found guilty of murder for his part in the attack and sentenced to life imprisonment in October 1999. He admitted to driving the car which had contained three members of the UVF unit to the Quinn home. He named the three men as Johnny McKay and brothers Raymond and Ivan Parke. However, the three men were not charged with the murders due to a lack of concrete evidence.

Gilmour's defence lawyer described him as a hard-working farm machinery salesman who was unwillingly part of the attack and did not know he was driving the men to petrol-bomb the house. The judge, Lord Justice McCollum, called Gilmour a "resourceful liar" who knew the house was going to be petrol bombed and knew there were children inside. Gilmour and his girlfriend Christina Lofthouse alleged that a Catholic uncle of the Quinn boys, Colm Quinn, had offered their daughter a sweet which was actually a small piece of cannabis. Quinn confirmed that the couple had accused him of being a drug dealer, forcing him to flee the Carnany estate. Visiting his old house three months before the murders, Quinn said he was confronted by Gilmour again and was warned he was "going to be sorted out".

The Orange Order released a press statement after the conviction, saying: "According to today's judgment the murders were a combination of a sectarian attack by the UVF and a personal grudge between Gilmour and the uncle of the three boys," and voiced the "Order's absolute commitment to ensuring that justice is done for their family".

Gilmour's conviction for murder was reduced to manslaughter on appeal on 5 June 2000 and he was released six years later. Nine days later, his life sentence was replaced by a fixed prison sentence of 14 years.

An uncle of the boys, Frankie Quinn, appeared in court in 2007 accused of stabbing Gilmour in Ballymoney. Quinn was successful in an application for bail.

== Sources ==
- Lost Lives:The stories of the men, women and children who died as a result of the Northern Ireland troubles, David McKittrick, Seamus Kelters, Brian Feeney and Christ Thornton, pp. 1434–1436. ISBN 9 781840 182279.
