= Orange riots (disambiguation) =

Orange riots, or Orange and Green riots, may refer to several civil disturbances between the Orange Order and Irish Catholics

- Orange riots, also known as the Orange and Green riots, or "slaughter on Eighth Avenue", refers to 1870 and 1871 civil conflicts in Manhattan, New York
- 1847 Woodstock riot, conflict in Woodstock, New Brunswick
- Jubilee riots, 1875 conflict in Toronto, Ontario
- Toronto circus riot, 1855 conflict in Toronto, Ontario in British Canada
- Boxing Day riots, conflict that took place on Boxing Day 1879 in Christchurch and Timaru in Canterbury
- Drumcree Conflict, a long-standing dispute and series of riots in Portadown, County Armagh
