= Drumcree conflict =

Northern Ireland dispute over parades

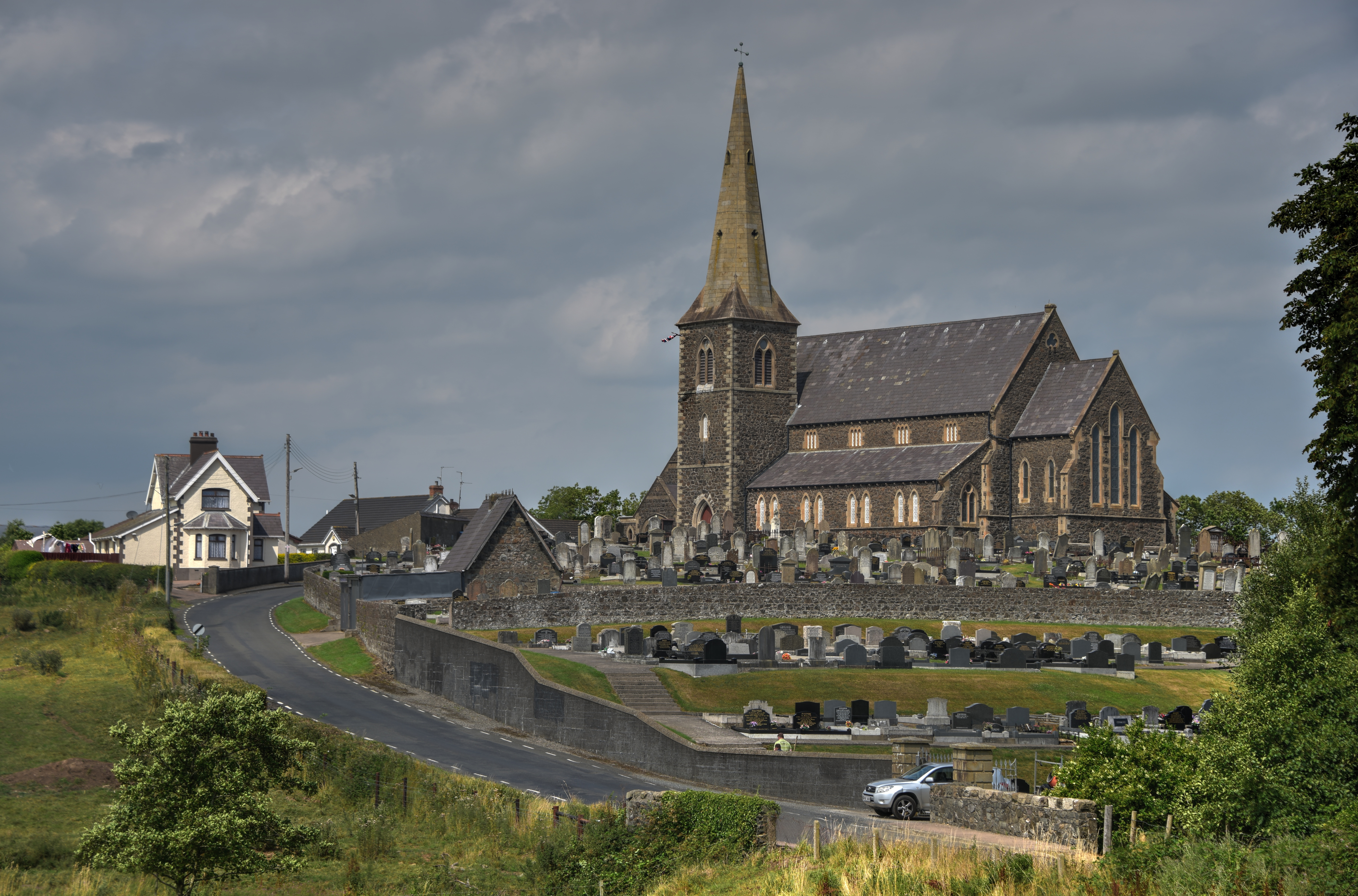
Drumcree Church; the Catholic area is behind the camera

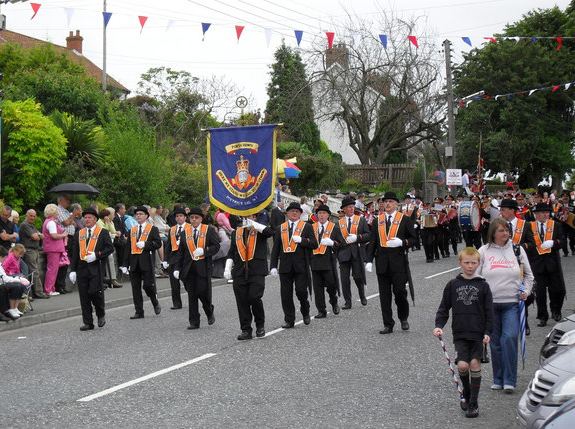
Some members of Portadown District Loyal Orange Lodge marching in Armagh during the 12 July parades, 2009

The Drumcree conflict or Drumcree standoff is a dispute over annual parades in Portadown, County Armagh, Northern Ireland. The town is mainly Protestant but has a significant Catholic minority. The Protestant Orange Order has sought to march its traditional route to and from Drumcree Church on the Sunday before the Twelfth of July. Much of the route passes through a mainly Catholic part of town, where residents, who regard the march as sectarian, triumphalist, and supremacist, have sought to prevent it from passing through their area.

The Orangemen had marched the route since 1807, with intermittent violence over the march since the 1870s. The dispute intensified during the Troubles, initially focusing on the outward route along Obins Street. Following protests and violence in the 1980s, the march was banned from Obins Street and an alternative route was used from 1987. The dispute subsequently focused on the return route along Garvaghy Road.

From 1995 to 2000, the dispute drew international attention, resulting in major protests, violence and large-scale police and British Army operations, as well as threatening the Northern Ireland peace process. From 1998, the march was banned from Garvaghy Road, leading to annual standoffs at Drumcree and widespread loyalist violence. The dispute was also linked to several killings during this period.

Tensions declined after 2001, although the Orange Order continued to seek permission to march along Garvaghy Road. In 2026, the Parades Commission permitted an Orange Order march along the road for the first time in 28 years. The decision led to renewed protests and a standoff before Northern Ireland Secretary Chris Bryant banned the march. The courts subsequently upheld both the Parades Commission's original decision and Bryant's later ban.

== Background ==
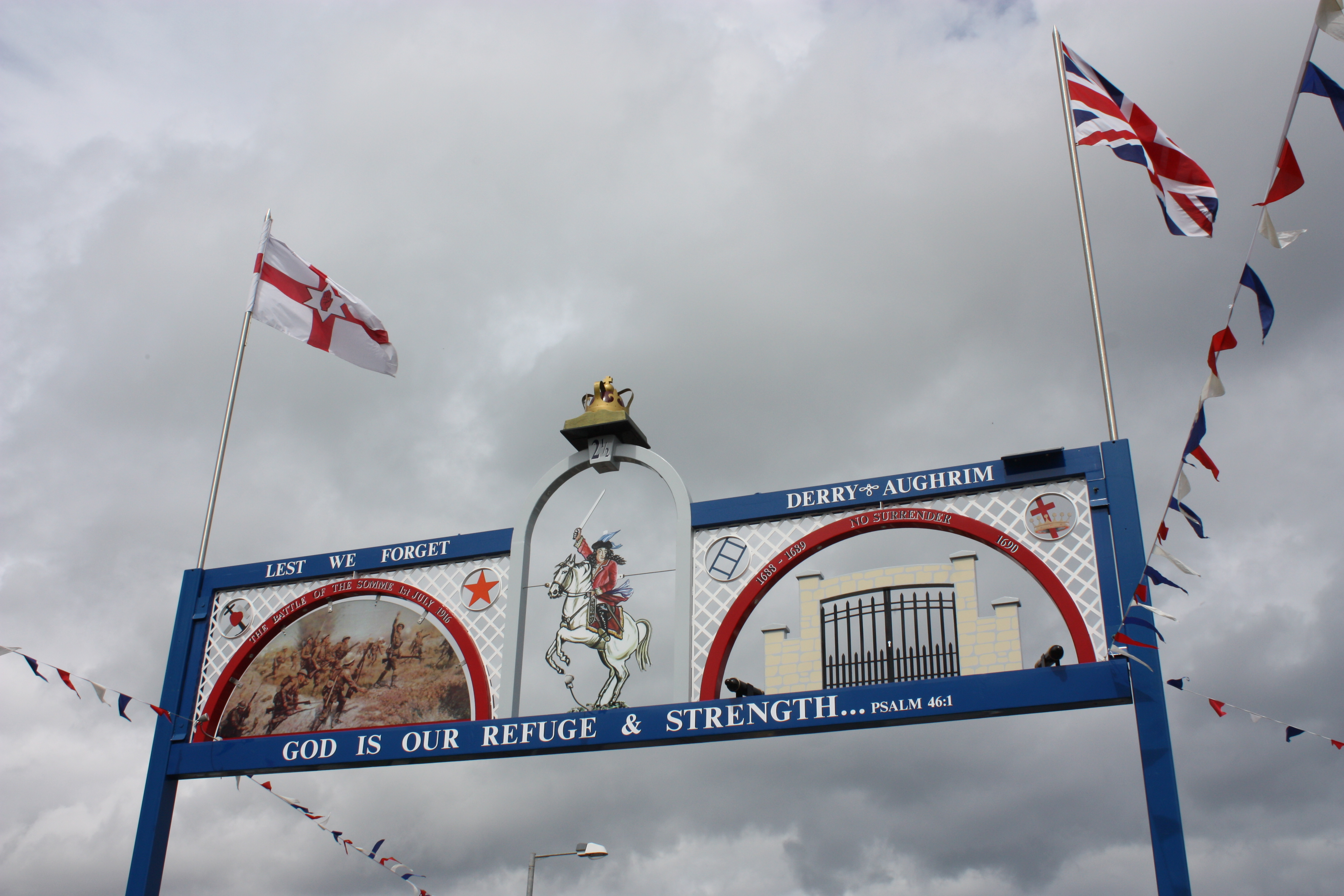
An "Orange Arch" in Annalong. Similar arches are erected in Portadown each summer, including one at the end of the mainly nationalist and Catholic Garvaghy Road.

Portadown has long been mainly Protestant and unionist. At the height of the conflict in the 1990s, about 70% of the population were from a Protestant background and about 30% from a Catholic background. Catholics and Irish nationalists in the town, as in the rest of Northern Ireland, had long experienced discrimination, particularly in employment. Throughout the 20th century, the Royal Ulster Constabulary (RUC), was almost wholly Protestant. Each summer, the town centre displays loyalist flags and symbols. A loyalist arch is raised over the Garvaghy Road at the Corcrain River, just inside the Catholic district, to coincide with the marching season, when numerous Protestant and loyalist parades are held in the town.

Each July, five Protestant or loyalist parades enter the mainly nationalist district:

- The Drumcree Sunday parade from the town centre to Drumcree Church and back. This is the largest of the parades. Its traditional route was Obins Street→Corcrain Road→Dungannon Road→Drumcree Road→Garvaghy Road, but it is now banned from Obins Street and Garvaghy Road.
- The 12 July parade. This involves a morning march from Corcrain Orange Hall to the town centre. The marchers then travel to a larger parade elsewhere, return to the town centre in the evening, and march back to Corcrain Orange Hall. Its traditional route was along Obins Street, but it is now along Corcrain Road.
- The 13 July parade, which follows the same format as the 12 July parade.
- A junior Orange parade each May along the lower Garvaghy Road at Victoria Terrace.

=== Map ===
Routes of the Protestant parades before they were banned from Obins Street (A) in 1986.

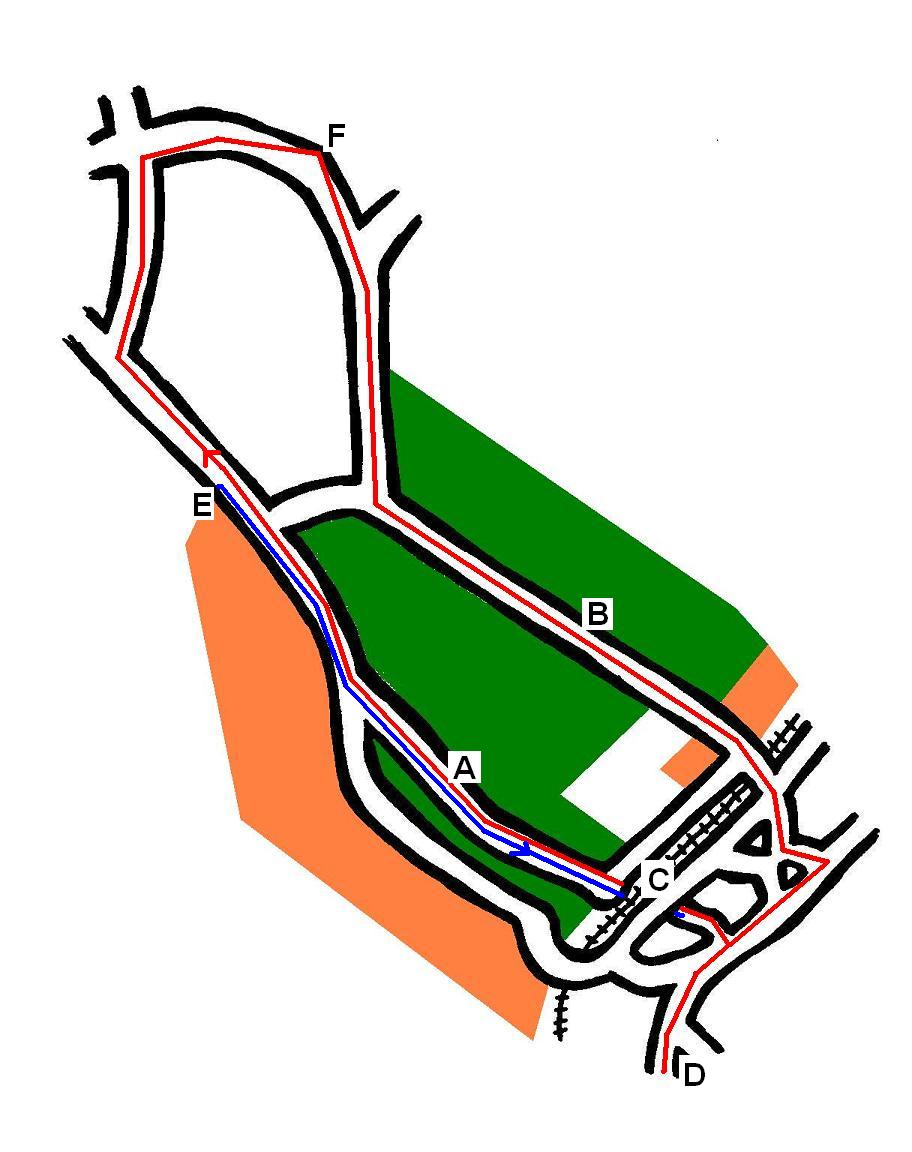

Red line: Route taken by Orangemen on the Sunday before 12 July; from their Carlton Street Hall (D) under the railway bridge (C) along Obins Street (A) to Drumcree Church (F) and back along Garvaghy Road (B).
Blue line: Route taken on 12 July; from Corcrain Hall (E) along Obins Street (A) and under the railway bridge (C).
Green areas are largely nationalist and Catholic.
Orange areas are largely unionist and Protestant.

=== Before partition ===
The Orange Order was founded in 1795 in the village of Loughgall, a few miles from Drumcree, after the Battle of the Diamond. Its first marches were held on 12 July 1796 in Portadown, Lurgan, and Waringstown. The area is thus regarded as the birthplace of Orangeism.

In July 1795, the year the Order formed, Reverend Devine delivered a Battle of the Boyne commemoration sermon at Drumcree Church. In History of Ireland Vol I (1809), Francis Plowden described what followed:

[Reverend Devine] so worked up the minds of his audience, that upon retiring from service [...] they gave full scope to the anti-papistical zeal, with which he had inspired them; falling upon every Catholic they met, beating and bruising them without provocation or distinction, breaking the doors and windows of their houses, and actually murdering two unoffending Catholics in a bog.

The first official Orange parade to and from Drumcree Church took place in 1807. It originally commemorated the Battle of the Boyne, but since 1998 the Order has said that it commemorates the Battle of the Somme. On the first Sunday in July each year, Orangemen marched from their hall in the town centre to Drumcree, via Obins Street and Dungannon Road, returning along Garvaghy Road. In the early 19th century, this area was mostly farmland.

In 1835, Armagh magistrate William Hancock (a Protestant) wrote that "For some time past the peaceable inhabitants of the parish of Drumcree have been insulted and outraged by large bodies of Orangemen parading the highways, playing party tunes, firing shots and using the most opprobrious epithets they could invent". He added that the Orangemen went "a considerable distance out of their way" to pass a Catholic chapel on their march to Drumcree. There was violence during the Drumcree parades in 1873, 1883, 1885, 1886, 1892, 1903, 1905, 1909, and 1917.

=== After partition ===
After the partition of Ireland in 1921, Northern Ireland Government policy tended to favour Protestant and unionist parades. From 1922 to 1950, almost 100 parades and meetings were banned under the Special Powers Act, nearly all of them were Irish nationalist or republican. Although violence declined during this period, there were clashes at the 1931 and 1950 Drumcree parades. The Public Order Act 1951 exempted "traditional" parades from having to seek police permission, while "non-traditional" parades could be banned or re‑routed without appeal. The legislation again tended to benefit Protestant parades.

In the 1960s, housing estates were built along Garvaghy Road. In 1969, Northern Ireland entered the period known as the Troubles. Portadown underwent major population shifts; the new estates became almost wholly Catholic, while the rest of the town's estates became almost wholly Protestant. Many Orangemen joined the Northern Ireland security forces, including the Royal Ulster Constabulary (RUC) and the Ulster Defence Regiment (UDR).

== 1970s and 1980s: Obins Street ==
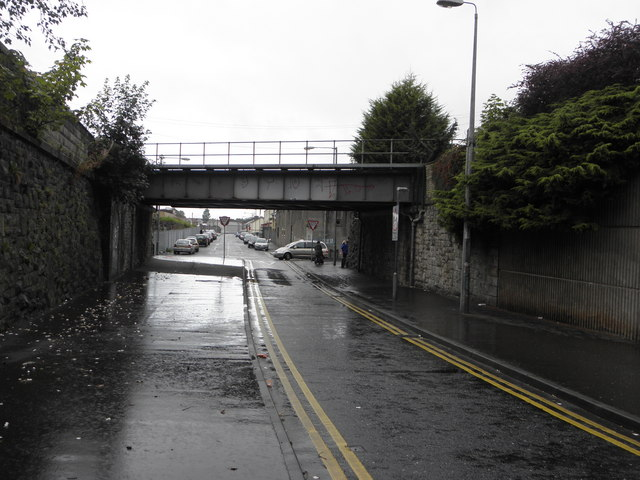
The underpass leading from the town centre (behind camera) to Obins Street (beyond the bridge). The area is known as "the Tunnel".

=== 1972 ===
In March 1972, thousands of loyalists attended an Ulster Vanguard rally in Portadown, which was addressed by Martin Smyth, Grand Master of the Orange Order, and the mayor of Portadown. After the rally, loyalists attacked the Catholic neighbourhood around Obins Street, known as "The Tunnel". Catholic residents then formed a protest group, the "Portadown Resistance Council", which called for the upcoming marches to be re-routed away from Obins Street (see map). The Ulster Defence Association (UDA), a then-legal loyalist vigilante and paramilitary group, warned of consequences if the march was obstructed.

The day before the march, Catholics sealed off Obins Street with makeshift barricades. On the morning of Sunday 9 July, British troops and riot police moved in to secure the area. When they bulldozed the barricades they were stoned by Catholic protesters and responded by firing CS gas and rubber bullets. Once the area was secured, they allowed the 1,200 Orangemen to march along the road, which was lined by at least 50 masked and uniformed UDA members. The UDA men then travelled to Drumcree and escorted the Orangemen back into town along Garvaghy Road. With troops and police deployed in strength, the march passed without incident.

On 12 July, three men were shot dead in Portadown. A Protestant, Paul Beattie, was shot in Churchill Park, a housing estate off Garvaghy Road. Hours later, a UDA member and former police officer entered McCabe's Bar and shot the Catholic pub-owner, Jack McCabe, and a Protestant customer, William Cochrane. Under tight security, the Orangemen again marched along Obins Street that day, from Corcrain Orange Hall to the town centre. On 15 July, Catholic civilian Felix Hughes was kidnapped, beaten, tortured, and shot dead by the UDA in a Protestant area of the town. He had been a long-time member of St Patrick's Accordion Band based on Obins Street.

Later in July, the Provisional Irish Republican Army (IRA) detonated a bomb on Woodhouse Street, and loyalists bombed a Catholic church. In the Obins Street area, there was also a gun battle involving the IRA, the UDA, and the security forces. The UDA's involvement in the 1972 dispute made a lasting impression on Catholics and Irish nationalists in Portadown. The IRA stated that the UDA would not be allowed to repeat such actions.

=== 1985 ===
Park Road, Portadown, 2010s

On Saint Patrick's Day 1985, the Saint Patrick's Accordion Band, a local Catholic marching band, was given permission to parade a two-mile circuit of the mainly Catholic area. A small part of the route, about 150 yards of Park Road, was lined with Protestant-owned houses. Arnold Hatch, the town's Ulster Unionist Party (UUP) mayor, demanded that the march be banned. When the police allowed it to go ahead, Hatch and a small group of loyalists staged a sit-down protest on Park Road. The police forced the band to turn back. That evening, the band again attempted to march the route. Although the protesters had left, police again stopped the band and there was a confrontation between police and residents. Following this, Portadown Catholics boosted their campaign to ban Orange marches from Obins Street. Social Democratic and Labour Party (SDLP) politician Bríd Rodgers described the incident as "pivotal" in the escalation of the parade dispute.

1985 was the first time the band had been given permission to march the route, following a high-profile campaign backed by Bríd Rogers which saw letters sent to senior politicians in Britain, the Republic of Ireland, and the United States. Growing cooperation between Ireland and the United Kingdom, which developed into the Anglo-Irish Agreement, provided the context for the RUC relenting on the issue, on the condition that the band complete its route in the predominantly Catholic area without displaying the Irish tricolour or having accompanying supporters. Catholic frustration at the ban was heightened by the RUC facilitating Orange Order marches in the area each year. Residents alleged that the only time Obins Street was cleaned by the local council was the week before the Twelfth of July, and that the RUC ordered residents to remove their cars from the street to give loyalist marchers an unobstructed passage. Residents were reportedly confined to their homes, curfew-style, for the duration of the parade. Anger was further fuelled by the way bands, especially drummers, intensified their playing as they passed the parochial house, and by allegations that Orangemen and supporters broke away from the parade to urinate on its walls. The presence of the overwhelmingly Protestant Ulster Defence Regiment (UDR) exacerbated tensions; residents alleged that UDR soldiers verbally and physically assaulted members of the Catholic community, particularly on the way to and from mass.

Shortly before the Drumcree parade of 7 July 1985, hundreds of residents staged a sit-down protest on Obins Street. Present was Eunice Kennedy Shriver, sister of former US president John F. Kennedy. Among the 2,000 Orangemen were unionist politicians Martin Smyth, the Orange Grand Master, Harold McCusker, and George Seawright. Riot police, armed with batons, forcefully removed the protesters and allowed the march to continue. At least one man was beaten unconscious by police and many were arrested. The whole length of Garvaghy Road was lined with British Army and police armoured vehicles for the march's return leg. At one point stones were thrown at the marchers and an Orangeman was injured. Police announced that the 12 and 13 July marches would be re-routed away from Obins Street. On 12 July, eight Orange lodges and hundreds of loyalist bandsmen met at Corcrain Orange Hall and attempted to march through Obins Street to the town centre. When they were blocked by police, hundreds of loyalists gathered at both ends of Obins Street and attacked police lines for several hours. These clashes resumed the following evening and loyalists attacked police with ball bearings fired from slingshots. In the two-day clashes, at least 52 police officers and 28 rioters were injured, 37 people were arrested, including two UDR soldiers, and about 50 Catholic-owned homes and businesses were attacked. After this, police erected a barrier at each end of Obins Street.

In July 1985, residents of the Catholic district formed a group called People Against Injustice, later renamed the Drumcree Faith & Justice Group (DFJG). It quickly became the main group representing the residents. The DFJG sought to explain to Orangemen how residents felt about the marches and to improve cross-community relations. It organised peaceful protests, issued newsletters, and held talks with police. It also attempted, unsuccessfully, to hold talks with the Orangemen. One of the key figures in the group was a Jesuit priest who, during one of his Sunday sermons in Portadown, suggested that anyone who voted for Sinn Féin should consider themselves excommunicated.

=== 1986 ===
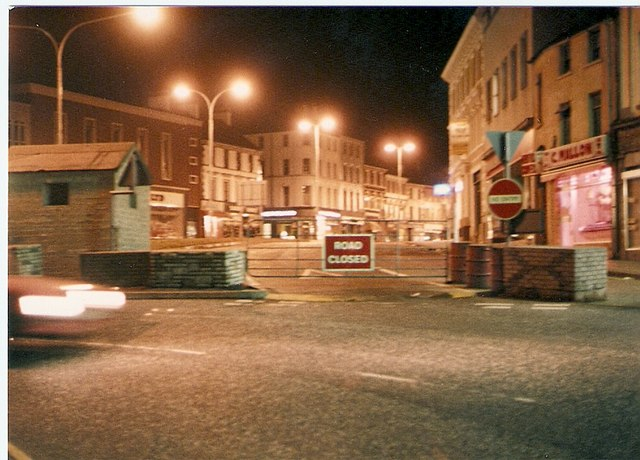
Security barriers blocking entrance to Portadown town centre in the 1980s

The Apprentice Boys of Derry, a Protestant fraternity similar to the Orange Order, had planned to march along Garvaghy Road and through the town centre on the afternoon of 1 April, Easter Monday. On 31 March, police decided to ban the march as they believed loyalist paramilitaries were planning to hijack it. That evening, cars with loudspeakers toured Protestant areas and summoned people to gather in the town centre to contest the ban. At 1 am, at least 3,000 loyalists gathered in the town centre, forced their way past a small group of police, and began marching along Garvaghy Road. Among them was Ian Paisley, leader of the Democratic Unionist Party (DUP) and Free Presbyterian Church. Residents alleged that some of the marchers were carrying guns and were known to be members of the police and UDR. Some of the marchers attacked houses along the route and residents alleged that police did little or nothing to stop this. Rioting followed between residents and police, and residents set up barricades for fear of further attacks. There was a feeling among locals that police had "mutinied" and refused to enforce the ban. In the afternoon, Apprentice Boys bands attempted to enter the town centre for their planned march. When police blocked them, a fierce riot erupted. After negotiations, the bands were allowed to march through the town centre with some restrictions. Loyalists then attacked police who had sealed off Obins Street. One of the loyalists, Keith White, was shot in the face by a plastic bullet and died in hospital on 14 April.

Police again decided that the Drumcree Sunday parade would be allowed along Obins Street with some restrictions, but that the 12 and 13 July parades would be re-routed. On 6 July 1986, an estimated 4,000 soldiers and police were deployed in the town for the Drumcree parade. Police said the Orange Order had allowed "known troublemakers" to take part in the march, contrary to a prior agreement. Among them was George Seawright, a unionist politician and Ulster Volunteer Force (UVF) member who had proposed burning Catholics in ovens. As the march entered the Catholic district, police seized Seawright and others. Orangemen then attacked the police and journalists. A Catholic priest was assaulted by loyalists and, at Drumcree, a police Land Rover was overturned. Catholic youths also threw missiles at police and marchers. At least 27 officers were injured.

The 12 July march into the town centre was blocked from Obins Street for the second year. Instead, police escorted the march along Garvaghy Road without any bands. Although there was no violence on Garvaghy Road, loyalists later rioted with police in the town centre and attempted to break through the barrier leading to Obins Street.

=== 1987 and 1988 ===
In 1987, the Public Order Act was repealed by the Public Order (Northern Ireland) Order 1987, which removed the special status of "traditional" parades. This meant that, after 1986, Orange marches were effectively banned from Obins Street indefinitely. The July 1987 march was re-routed, and 3,000 soldiers and 1,000 police were sent to keep order. Orangemen believed that sacrificing the Obins Street leg meant they would be guaranteed the Garvaghy Road leg. Although the Garvaghy Road leg had caused trouble before, it was less populated than Obins Street at the time.

In June 1988, the Drumcree Faith & Justice Group (DFJG), the group representing the Catholic/Irish nationalist residents, planned a march to the town centre to highlight what it saw as "double-standards" in the police's handling of nationalist and loyalist parades. It asked permission from police, saying there would be only 30 marchers and they would carry no flags or banners. Permission was denied.

== 1990s and 2000s: Garvaghy Road ==
Although a few years passed without serious conflict over the Drumcree parades, both sides remained unhappy with the situation. Orangemen took the new route each year, but continued to apply for marches along Obins Street. Meanwhile, residents of Garvaghy Road and the surrounding Catholic district (see map) opposed what they saw as "triumphalist" Orange marches through their area. They made their opposition known through the tenants' associations that represented each housing estate, the Drumcree Faith & Justice Group (DFJG), and local politicians. A 1993 survey of people living on Garvaghy Road found that 95% of them were against Orange marches in the area. In 1994, the Provisional IRA and Loyalist paramilitary groups called ceasefires.

By the mid-1990s, the population of Portadown was about 70% Protestant and 30% Catholic. There were three Orange halls in the town and an estimated 40 Protestant/loyalist marches each summer.

=== Garvaghy Road Residents Coalition ===
In May 1995, the Garvaghy Road Residents Coalition (GRRC) was formed, comprising representatives from the DFJG and the tenants' associations. Its main goal was to divert Orange marches away from Garvaghy Road through peaceful means. It held peaceful protests, petitioned the police and government ministers, and tried to draw media attention to the dispute. The GRRC held regular public meetings with residents. There were usually about 12 representatives on the committee at any one time. According to one of its members, Joanne Tennyson, "Although the GRRC could speak to anyone they wanted, at the end of the day no-one in the committee had the right to say we would do anything [...] The community had to agree as a whole and that was the purpose of holding public meetings". The GRRC's first secretary was Father Eamon Stack, a Jesuit priest and DFJG member who had lived in the area since 1993. Stack emphasized that the GRRC was non-sectarian and was not connected to any political parties. With the coalition chairman, he would remain its joint spokesman until after July 1997.

The first chairman of the GRRC was Malachy Trainor. He stepped down after a week following threats from Loyalist paramilitaries, who had killed two of his brothers (both Republican activists) and his mother in the 1970s. He was replaced by Breandán Mac Cionnaith, a former Republican militant. In 1982, he had been jailed for six years for his part in a bomb attack on Portadown Royal British Legion hall. David Trimble, then the local Unionist MP, cited Mac Cionnaith's presence as reason for refusing to have dealings with the GRRC.

=== 1995 ===
On Sunday 9 July 1995, the Orangemen marched to Drumcree Church, held their church service, and then began marching towards the Garvaghy Road. However, hundreds of Catholic residents were holding a sit-down protest on Garvaghy Road to block the march. Although the march was legal and the protest was not, police stopped the march from continuing. The Orangemen refused to take another route, announcing they would stay at Drumcree until they were allowed to continue. The Orangemen refused to negotiate with the residents' group, and the Mediation Network was called upon to intercede. The police and local politicians were also involved in trying to resolve the deadlock.

Meanwhile, about 10,000 Orangemen and supporters had gathered at Drumcree and were engaged in a standoff with about 1,000 police and soldiers. During this standoff, loyalists continuously threw missiles at police and tried to break through the blockade; officers responded by firing 24 plastic bullets. In support of the Orangemen, loyalists blocked numerous roads across Northern Ireland, and sealed off the port of Larne. There was violence in some Protestant areas. On the evening of Monday 10 July, DUP leader Ian Paisley and future UUP leader David Trimble held a rally at Drumcree. Paisley told a crowd of thousands:

There can be no turning back on this issue – we will die if necessary rather than surrender! If we don't win this battle all is lost. It is a matter of life and death; it is a matter of Ulster or the Irish Republic; it is a matter of freedom or slavery!

Afterwards, they gathered a number of Orangemen and tried to push through the police line but were taken away by officers.

Carleton Street Orange Hall, the starting and ending point of the march

On the morning of Tuesday 11 July, a compromise was reached. The Orangemen would be allowed to march along Garvaghy Road on condition that they did so silently and without accompanying bands. Ronnie Flanagan (Deputy Chief Constable of the police) told the GRRC that residents should peacefully remove themselves from the road because "an angry scene between police and protesters could worsen the Ormeau marching dispute and even destabilise the ceasefires". When GRRC chairman Breandán Mac Cionnaith asked protesters to clear the road, some heckled him and refused. Flanagan was told there would be a better chance of the protesters moving if they knew there would be no march there next year. Flanagan replied that "there was no question of marches going where there was no consent from the community". The residents were then persuaded to clear the road. This was all confirmed by the Mediation Network.

The Orangemen marched along the road with Paisley and Trimble at the head of the march. When the march finished at Carleton Street Orange Hall, Paisley and Trimble held their hands in the air in what appeared to be a gesture of triumph. Trimble claims that he only took Paisley's hand to prevent the DUP leader from taking all the media attention.

Both sides were deeply unhappy with the events of July 1995. Residents were angered that the parade had gone ahead and at what they saw as unionist triumphalism, while Orangemen and their supporters were angered that their parade had been held up by an illegal protest. Some Orangemen formed a group called Spirit of Drumcree (SoD) to defend their "right to march". At a SoD meeting in Belfast's Ulster Hall one of the platform speakers said, to applause:

Sectarian means you belong to a particular sect or organisation. I belong to the Orange Institution. Bigot means you look after the people you belong to. That's what I'm doing. I'm a sectarian bigot and proud of it.

=== 1996 ===
==== Drumcree standoff and loyalist violence ====
On Saturday 6 July 1996, the Chief Constable, Sir Hugh Annesley, stated that the parade would be banned from Garvaghy Road. The RUC had acknowledged this could result in "a very high number of Orangemen laying siege to Portadown". Police checkpoints and barricades were set up on all routes into the Catholic area.

On Sunday 7 July, the march was blocked by police barricades at Drumcree. At least 4,000 Orangemen and loyalist supporters began another standoff. That afternoon, Orange 'Grand Master' Martin Smyth arrived at Drumcree and announced there could be no compromise. He warned, "If the security services can block the roads, so can we" and said that if loyalists break the law it is because the people have "no other way". Over the next three days, buses full of Orangemen and their supporters arrived in Portadown, bringing traffic to a standstill. By Wednesday night, the number of Orangemen and loyalists at Drumcree had risen to 10,000. Again, they pelted riot police with missiles and tried to break through the blockade, while police responded with plastic bullets. Loyalists brought an armour-plated bulldozer to Drumcree, threatening to storm the police line.

Throughout Northern Ireland, loyalists blocked hundreds of roads, clashed with police, and attacked or intimidated Catholics. Many towns and villages were blockaded, either completely or for much of the daytime. Several Catholic families were forced to flee their homes in Belfast due to loyalist intimidation. Human Rights Watch said that police failed to remove these illegal roadblocks and had "abandoned its traditional policing function in some areas". Loyalists also attacked the homes of police officers, mainly of those on duty at Drumcree. Thousands of extra British troops were sent to Northern Ireland, bringing the total number of troops deployed to 18,500.

On the night of 7 July, Catholic taxi driver Michael McGoldrick was shot dead on a country lane near Aghagallon by the Mid-Ulster Brigade of the Ulster Volunteer Force (UVF), a loyalist paramilitary group. Security sources and loyalists say the killing was ordered by the brigade's leader Billy Wright, from Portadown, as a warning against blocking the Drumcree march. Wright and his men had originally planned to kidnap three Catholic priests from a parochial house and kill them if the Orange march was banned from Garvaghy Road. Wright was frequently seen at Drumcree in the company of Harold Gracey, head of the Portadown Orangemen. Gracey had thanked Wright for his role in supporting the Orangemen the year before. Wright also held a meeting with unionist leader David Trimble. Members of Wright's brigade smuggled homemade weaponry to Drumcree, apparently unhindered by the Orangemen. Allegedly, they planned to drive petrol tankers into the Garvaghy area and blow them up unless the march was allowed through.

On Wednesday 10 July, police reported that, over the previous four days of loyalist protests, there had been:

- 758 attacks on police, leaving 50 police injured
- 662 plastic bullets fired by police
- 90 civilians injured
- 100 incidents of intimidation
- 156 arrests made

==== Police reversal and Irish nationalist riots ====
Shortly before noon on Thursday 11 July, the Chief Constable reversed his decision and allowed the Orangemen to march along Garvaghy Road. The residents' group had not been consulted on this and rioting erupted as police in armoured vehicles flooded the Garvaghy area and batoned hundreds of protesters off the Garvaghy Road. About 1,200 Orangemen then marched down the road while residents were hemmed into their estates by riot police. There was outrage among the Catholic/nationalist community, who believed police had "surrendered" to loyalist violence and threats. An article in the Irish News concluded that "police did not have the will to impose the rule of law on the Orange Order and loyalists". The Chief Constable said he believed the situation could no longer be contained. He claimed the crowd at Drumcree was expected to rise to 60,000 or 70,000 that night and would have broken through the defences and attacked the Catholic area. Nationalists argued that the police did nothing to stop the thousands of loyalists from gathering.

Rioting erupted in Catholic/nationalist areas of Lurgan, Armagh, Belfast and Derry. In Derry, 22 protesters were seriously injured and one, Dermot McShane, died after being run-over by a British Army armoured vehicle. An inquest later ruled that Private Daniel Moran, the driver, did not follow proper military procedures. The rioting was some of the worst in Derry during the Troubles. Rioting continued throughout the week, during which time the police fired 6,000 plastic bullets, 5,000 of which were directed at nationalists. The Committee on the Administration of Justice (CAJ), who had sent members to observe the situation, condemned this "completely indiscriminate" use of plastic bullets. Human Rights Watch also accused police of using "excessive force".

Leaders of Sinn Féin and the SDLP stated that nationalists had completely lost faith in the RUC as an impartial police force. In protest, the SDLP resigned its 21 seats in the Northern Ireland Forum, and support grew for Sinn Féin and the IRA.

==== Aftermath ====
In August 1996, Billy Wright and his Portadown unit of the UVF were "stood down" by the UVF leadership for breaking the ceasefire. The UVF warned Wright to leave Northern Ireland. He ignored the warning, and a large rally was held in Portadown in support of him. Harold Gracey (head of the Portadown Orangemen) and William McCrea (a DUP politician) attended the rally and made speeches in support of Wright. Along with most of his Portadown unit, Wright then formed a splinter group called the Loyalist Volunteer Force (LVF).

Following the events of July 1996, many Catholics and nationalists began boycotting businesses run by Orangemen who had been involved in the standoff. This boycott particularly affected Protestant-owned businesses in Catholic-majority towns of counties Armagh and Tyrone.

Commenting on the 1996 crisis, a Northern Ireland Office official said constraints on parades aroused an "atavistic response from the unionist community", which recognised it had "lost dominance" in Northern Ireland; while "to many nationalists, the handling of the parades issue is an acid test of [the British Government's] resolve to create in NI a just and equitable society".

The Drumcree dispute inflamed sectarian tension in Portadown and was blamed for the death of Darren Murray in October 1996. The 12-year-old Catholic boy from Garvaghy was struck by a van on Corcrain Road during an altercation with Protestant youths, who reportedly called him a "Fenian nigger" and cheered when he was hit.

=== 1997 ===
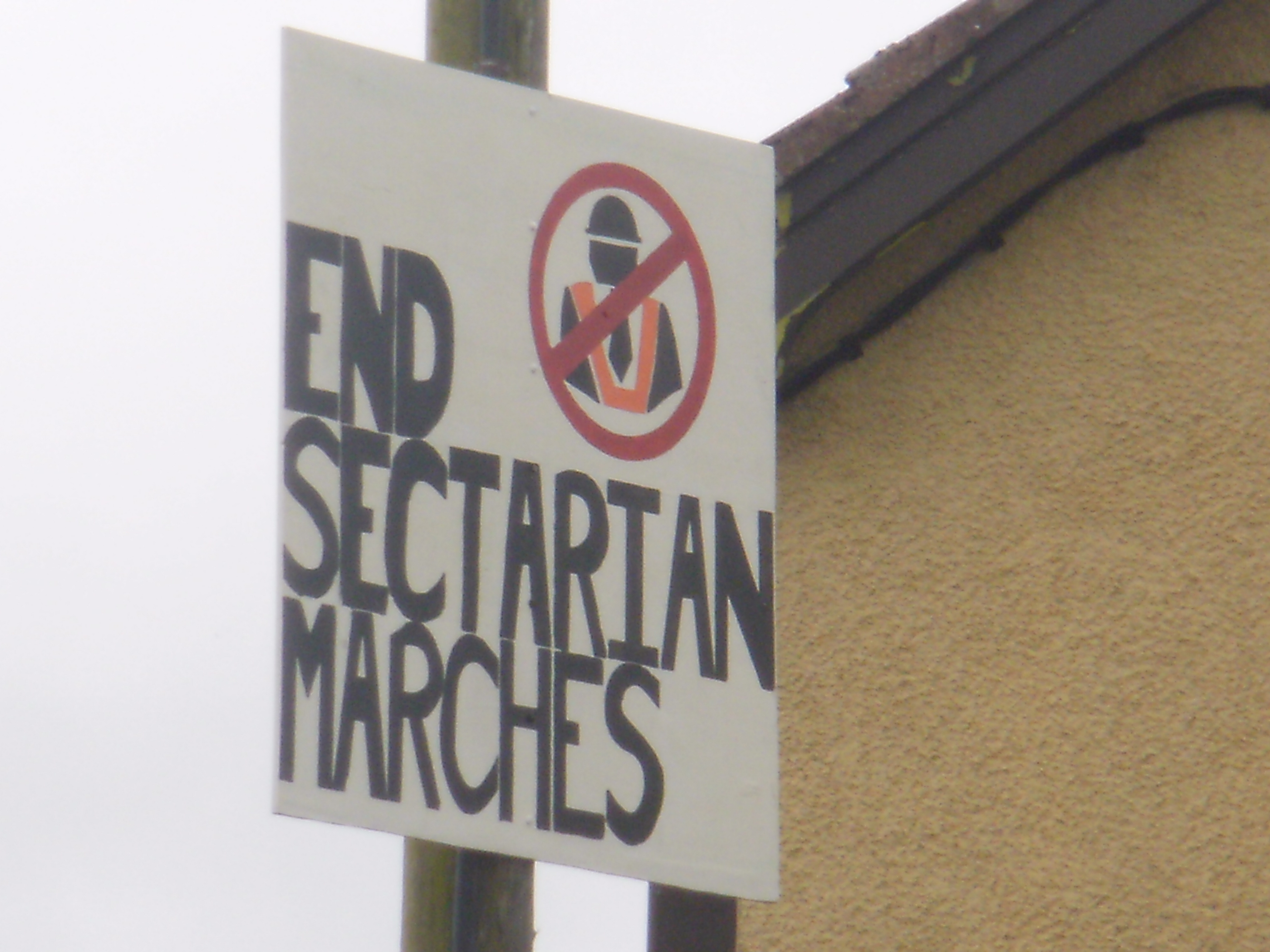
A placard opposing Orange marches in nationalist areas. Similar placards were used by protesters during the 1997 crisis

In May 1997, a local Catholic, Robert Hamill, was kicked to death by a gang of loyalists on Portadown's main street. He and his friends were attacked while walking home. Some loyalists and Orangemen taunted local Catholics over the murder by jumping and stamping on the ground during parades, to mimic the attack on Hamill. That same month, Catholic civilian Sean Brown was abducted and shot dead by loyalists in Bellaghy. The mainly-Catholic village had a similar dispute over Orange marches. The Loyalist Volunteer Force (LVF) claimed responsibility, falsely claiming that Brown had been involved in re-routing the local Orange march. In June 1997, RUC officer Gregory Taylor was fatally beaten by a loyalist mob outside a pub in Ballymoney, County Antrim. The crowd, which reportedly included several loyalist bandsmen, were angry at the RUC's recent role in blocking Orangemen from marching through the mainly-Catholic village of Dunloy.

Weeks before the July 1997 march, Secretary of State Mo Mowlam privately decided to let the march proceed along Garvaghy Road. However, in the days leading up to the march, she insisted no decision had been made. Meanwhile, thousands of British troops were flown to Northern Ireland in preparation of disorder. Less than twelve hours before the march, the authorities still did not say whether it would be blocked.

Garvaghy Road residents applied to hold a festival on the day of the march. When this was banned by police, local women set up a peace camp beside the Garvaghy Road. On 3 July, the LVF threatened to kill Catholic civilians if the march was blocked and the Ulster Unionist Party threatened to withdraw from the Northern Ireland peace process. The following day, sixty families were evacuated from their homes on Garvaghy Road after a loyalist bomb threat.

At 3:30 am on the morning of the march, Sunday 6 July, 1,500 police and soldiers swept into the Catholic area in armoured vehicles to take control of Garvaghy Road. Near the junction with Drumcree Road, they were confronted by a large crowd of residents blocking their path. The riot police dismounted and were immediately attacked with a barrage of stones, bricks and petrol bombs. The RUC responded by firing plastic bullets at rioters. The riot police gradually pushed the protesters away from the Garvaghy Road and lined both sides of the road with dozens of armoured vehicles.

Further along, about 150 residents rushed to the Garvaghy Road and held a sit-down protest at the junction with Ashgrove Road. They were surrounded by riot police and armoured vehicles, who separated them from the rest of the crowds, but they remained on the road for the next several hours. Eventually they were forcefully removed by police, who were then pelted with stones and petrol bombs as they pushed residents further back from the road. Rosemary Nelson—a human rights lawyer and the GRRC's legal advisor—was physically and verbally abused by police officers. From this point onward, residents were prevented from leaving their housing estates and accessing the Garvaghy Road. As residents were also unable to reach the Catholic church, the local priests held an open-air mass in front of a line of soldiers and armoured personnel carriers.

Some residents stood outside their homes with their backs to the Orangemen as a form of protest. One resident said: "The soldiers told us to get back into our house. They were telling us we couldn't even stand in our own front garden". Another said, "This is the only area we can exist in and even when we live here we have no right to live in peace". After the march passed, the security forces began withdrawing from the area and severe rioting began. They were attacked by hundreds of nationalists with stones, bricks and petrol bombs. The security forces fired about 40 plastic bullets, and about 18 people were taken to hospital. The Chief Constable said he had allowed the march to go ahead because of the threat to Catholic civilians by loyalist paramilitaries. About 1,200 Orangemen marched along Garvaghy Road at noon that day.

As news from Portadown emerged, protests broke out in Catholic neighbourhoods across Northern Ireland, some of which led to clashes with the security forces. Nationalists blocked roads with burning vehicles and attacked the police and army. In nearby Lurgan, ten masked Provisional IRA members hijacked a train, forced the passengers off and set the train on fire, destroying it. Youths then painted on it "No justice, no Peace Train". The IRA and Irish National Liberation Army (INLA) launched numerous gun and bomb attacks on the security forces. A number of Orange halls suffered arson attacks. Nationalists announced that they would block other contentious Orange marches planned for 12 July, including those on the Ormeau Road and in Bellaghy, Armagh, Newry, Derry and Strabane. There was speculation of potential civil war. The widespread unrest lasted until 10 July, when the Orange Order announced they were unilaterally re-routing or cancelling six marches. By the end of the violence, more than 100 civilians and 60 police officers had been injured, while 117 people had been arrested. There had been 815 attacks on the security forces, 1,506 petrol bombs thrown and 402 hijackings. The police had fired 2,500 plastic bullets.

On 15 July, an LVF gunman shot dead a Catholic teenager, Bernadette Martin (18), while she slept at her Protestant boyfriend's home in Aghalee, outside Lurgan. Media reports linked the murder to tensions arising from the Drumcree dispute. The perpetrator had been present at Drumcree in support of the Orangemen, and attended an Orange march in Lurgan hours before the murder. The same handgun was used in the killing of Michael McGoldrick twelve months earlier.

In 1997, Sinn Féin leader Gerry Adams told an RTÉ journalist of his party's involvement in the dispute:

Ask any activist in the north, "did Drumcree happen by accident?", and he will tell you, "no". Three years of work on the lower Ormeau Road, Portadown and parts of Fermanagh and Newry, Armagh and in Bellaghy and up in Derry. Three years of work went into creating that situation and fair play to those people who put the work in. They are the type of scene changes that we have to focus on and develop and exploit.

After July 1997, GRRC member Breandán Mac Cionnaith replaced Eamon Stack as the group's spokesman. Mac Cionnaith had spent time in prison in the 1980s for an IRA bomb attack on Portadown's Royal British Legion hall.

This was the last time that the Orange Order was allowed to march on Garvaghy Road.

=== 1998 ===
Early in 1998, the Public Processions Act was passed, establishing a Parades Commission to make decisions on contentious marches. On 10 April 1998, the Good Friday Agreement was signed. It was supported by almost all parties in the Northern Ireland Forum; it was opposed by the DUP and the Orange Order. The first civilian victim of the conflict after the agreement was Catholic father Adrian Lamph (29). He was shot dead by an LVF gunman on 21 April while working at the Fair Green council depot in Portadown. Lamph was from the Garvaghy Road and the sectarian killing was linked to tensions around the Drumcree dispute.

==== Drumcree standoff and loyalist violence ====
A British Army Humber Pig, similar to the armoured personnel carriers deployed in Portadown

The British Army used Chinook helicopters to ferry troops to Drumcree in 1998

On 29 June 1998, the Parades Commission decided to ban that year's Orange march from Garvaghy Road. It said that if the march went ahead, it would have "serious adverse impact on community relationships, both locally and ... across Northern Ireland". The Commission said that the main cause of opposition to the parade was "the context in which it occurs". It noted the history of sectarianism, violence and killings; the "deep resentment between the two communities" in Portadown; and the Order's insistence on marching despite the feelings of the residents. It also said there had been a lack of movement towards an agreement. The parade was allowed to go along Corcrain Road to Drumcree Church, and either go back into town the same way, or finish at the church.

On the night of Thursday 2 July, ten Catholic churches were set on fire across mid Ulster. The security forces believe it was a co-ordinated attack by the LVF, as retaliation for the Drumcree march being blocked from Garvaghy Road.

On Friday 3 July, about 1,000 soldiers and 1,000 police were deployed in Portadown. The soldiers built large barricades made of steel, concrete and barbed wire across all roads leading into the Catholic area. In the fields between Drumcree Church and the Catholic area they dug a trench, fourteen feet wide, which was lined with rows of barbed wire. Chinook helicopters ferried troops and equipment to Drumcree. Soldiers in armoured personnel carriers also occupied the Catholic Drumcree College, St John the Baptist Primary School, and some properties near the barricades.

On Sunday 5 July, the Orangemen marched to Drumcree Church and stated they would remain there until they were allowed to proceed. About 10,000 Orangemen and loyalists arrived at Drumcree from across Northern Ireland. Over the next ten days, there were sustained attacks on the security forces at Drumcree and attempts to break through the barricades. On 9 July, they were attacked with gunfire and homemade bombs; they responded with plastic bullets. There were loyalist protests and violence across Northern Ireland in response to the ban. Loyalists blocked roads and attacked the security forces as well as Catholic homes, businesses, schools and churches. On 7 July, more than 1,000 Orangemen "besieged" the mainly Catholic village of Dunloy, which had a similar dispute over parades. The County Antrim Grand Lodge said that its members had "taken up positions" and "held" the village. On 8 July, eight homemade bombs were thrown at Catholic homes in the Collingwood area of Lurgan.

Breandán Mac Cionnaith, Garvaghy Road Residents Coalition spokesman, said "This community is surrounded, living under siege, and no one from the British or Irish governments is doing anything to lift the siege". Catholics elsewhere in the province organised humanitarian aid for the residents. On 10 July, they travelled to Portadown in a convoy of almost 100 cars. Organisers said the last four cars had their windows smashed by loyalists when the convoy was stopped at a checkpoint.

A loyalist group calling itself "Portadown Action Command" issued a statement which read:

"As from midnight on Friday 10 July 1998, any driver of any vehicle supplying any goods of any kind to the Garvaghy Road will be summarily executed. This order also includes any driver of any vehicle supplying or maintaining services of any kind on the Garvaghy Road. ... It is a sad day when a convicted bomber can hold to ransom the good people of Portadown. You, Mr McKenna [Breandán MacCionnaith], have contaminated the ground on which you walk long enough. Your day is almost over".

The police recorded 2,561 "public order incidents" throughout Northern Ireland, including:

- 615 attacks on the security forces, which left 76 police offices injured
- 632 petrol bombs thrown
- 45 homemade bombs thrown
- 24 shooting incidents
- 144 houses and 165 other buildings attacked (the vast majority owned by Catholics)
- 467 vehicles attacked and 178 vehicles hijacked
- 837 plastic bullets fired by the security forces, and
- 284 people arrested

As the 12 July parades approached, David Jones, spokesman for the Portadown Orangemen, warned Prime Minister Tony Blair that the day could be his "Bloody Sunday".

==== Murder of the Quinn brothers ====
On Sunday 12 July, Jason (aged 8), Mark (aged 9) and Richard Quinn (aged 10) were killed when their home was petrol bombed by loyalists. The boys' mother was Catholic, and their home was in a mainly-Protestant estate in Ballymoney. Catholic residents in the estate had recently been sent death threats. The Chief Constable of the RUC, Ronnie Flanagan, described the killings as "brutal sectarian murders" and linked them to the violent protests surrounding Drumcree. The killings led to widespread calls for the Orangemen to end their stand-off. David Trimble, the First Minister of Northern Ireland and also an Orangeman, said:

"Those responsible for the murders have used these protests as an excuse for an appalling week of barbarity. The only way the Portadown brethren can clearly distance themselves from these murders and show to the world that they repudiate them is now to leave the hill at Drumcree".

The MP for Ballymoney, Democratic Unionist Party (DUP) leader Ian Paisley, described the killings as "diabolical". However, in an interview with ITN he stated: "The IRA have carried out worse murders than we had in Ballymoney, over and over again. No one said to them to call off their crimes".

Reverend William Bingham, the Orange Order's Grand Chaplain for County Armagh and one of the lead figures in the Drumcree dispute, said:

"After last night's atrocious act, a walk down the Garvaghy Road by the Orange Order would be a very hollow victory, because it would be in the shadow of three coffins of little boys who wouldn't even know what the Orange Order is about. ... Last night there was the evidence that things have got out of control ... And the great fear is that things will get worse and that more children's lives will be lost. ... No road is worth a life".

However, he later apologized for implying that the Order was responsible for the deaths. Although the number of protesters at Drumcree dropped considerably, the Portadown Orange lodges voted unanimously to continue their standoff, and argued that there was no link between their protest and the violence. Portadown Orange spokesman David Jones accused the security forces of colluding to launch the petrol bomb attack to discredit the Orangemen. One man was later convicted for the attack, which the judge declared to have been sectarian.

The leadership of the Church of Ireland condemned the "vile murders" and demanded the Portadown Orangemen "end their occupation of Church property at Drumcree forthwith". On Wednesday 15 July, a police search operation at Drumcree found loyalist weapons including a homemade machine gun, spent and live ammunition, explosive devices, and two crossbows with more than a dozen homemade explosive arrows.

==== Killing of Constable O'Reilly ====
Protests against the Parades Commission ban on the Garvaghy Road march continued throughout 1998. On 5 September, a loyalist crowd of several hundred held a demonstration in Portadown town centre, carrying placards proclaiming, "No Taigs Here". Some of the crowd assaulted and shouted abuse at Catholics nearby. Dozens of families doing their weekend shopping fled. One eyewitness, in the town centre with her two young sons, recalled: "They were like animals. The hatred was in their eyes. Women with children as young as mine were calling us Fenian bastards". Shortly before 5 pm, a Catholic-owned business was gutted in a petrol-bomb attack and others were damaged by men openly armed with baseball bats, chains and crowbars.

That evening, Orangemen and loyalists clashed with police who were shielding a Catholic enclave in the Corcrain Road area of Portadown. A loyalist threw a pipe bomb packed with explosives, ammunition and shotgun pellets at a line of RUC officers. Two officers were seriously injured; one of them, 30-year-old Constable Frank O'Reilly, a Catholic-born practicing Presbyterian, took the full force of the blast, shattering his riot shield. Some of the crowd reportedly cheered as the officers were taken to hospital. O'Reilly lost an eye, had shrapnel embedded in his skull and spent five weeks in critical condition in Royal Victoria Hospital. He died of his injuries on 6 October. David Jones, spokesman for the Portadown Orangemen, said they would continue protesting for their right to march. He commented: "Unfortunately when you are standing up for liberties, sometimes the cost of those liberties can be very high".

=== 1999 ===
In 1999, the Orangemen and supporters continued their protest rallies and marches in Portadown. A renegade loyalist group, the Orange Volunteers, also began carrying out gun and bomb attacks on Catholics and Irish nationalists in Northern Ireland.

On 14 March 1999, the Parades Commission said the yearly march would again be banned from Garvaghy Road. The following day, the GRRC's legal advisor, Rosemary Nelson, was assassinated by a bomb blast in Lurgan. Loyalists had attached a booby-trap device to her car. The attack was claimed by the "Red Hand Defenders".

In April, Portadown loyalists threatened to picket St John's Catholic Church at the top of Garvaghy Road. On 29 May, a junior Orange march passed near Garvaghy Road. There were clashes following the march, with 13 police officers and four civilians hurt. Police fired 50 plastic bullets during the clashes. That month, DUP representative and Orangeman Paul Berry said Orangemen would not be stopped from marching the Garvaghy Road: "If it is a matter of taking the law into our own hands then we are going to have to do it. That is a threat".

In early June, the Orange Order announced that it would begin a series of protests in support of the Portadown Orangemen. On 4 June, the Portadown Orangemen and the GRRC began indirect negotiations to resolve the dispute. These were "proximity talks" using go-betweens, as the Orangemen refused to talk directly to the GRRC.

The following day, 5 June, loyalist paramilitaries threw pipe bombs through the windows of two Catholic homes in Portadown's Corcrain estate. Elizabeth O'Neill, a 59-year-old Protestant married to a Catholic, attempted to throw the device outside but it exploded in her hand, killing her. David Trimble said the attacks were an attempt to derail efforts to resolve the Drumcree dispute. The victim's son asked whether a march down the Garvaghy Road was worth anyone's life.

On 24 June, Orangemen began a ten-day "Long March" from Derry to Drumcree in protest against the ban. The 1999 Drumcree march took place on Sunday 4 July. About 1,300 Orangemen marched to Drumcree and were met by several thousand supporters. The security forces had again blocked all roads leading into the Catholic area with large steel, concrete and barbed wire barricades. Rows of barbed wire were also stretched across the fields at Drumcree. There, loyalists threw missiles at police and soldiers, but there was less violence than the year before. Some senior Portadown Orangemen claim they had been promised a parade on Garvaghy Road later that year if they could control things on the traditional parading dates. On 5 July, police in Portadown arrested four Belfast loyalists after finding pickaxe handles, wire cutters, petrol and combat clothing in their car. Later that day, six officers were hurt in clashes with loyalists near Garvaghy Road. The barricades were eventually removed on 14 July.

On 31 July, a drunken loyalist wielding an AK-47 and a handgun crossed the interface to Craigwell Avenue, a street of Catholic homes, cocking the rifle. A resident wrestled him to the ground and disarmed him, but was shot and wounded while doing so. The loyalist was arrested and later convicted for attempted murder. In August, breeze blocks were thrown through the windows of houses on the street.

In an interview in July 1999, GRRC spokesman Breandán MacCionnaith said:

"The hundreds of Orangemen who turn up here every year ... can go home whenever they want. These people live here. They have to put up with this stuff day in, day out. If we were a Jewish or a Muslim or a black community in London then there is no way Tony Blair would come down and tell us that we should be making concessions to the people responsible for all the bigotry against us".

That year, the GRRC published a book detailing the history of Orange parades in the area. The book was called Garvaghy: A Community Under Siege.

After 1999, the Orange Order's membership for the Portadown district, which had risen from 1995 to 1998, began a "catastrophic slump".

=== 2000 ===
May–June

In May 2000, almost 200 masked loyalists attacked Catholic homes on Craigwell Avenue after assembling at Carlton Street Orange Hall. Police Land Rovers were nearby but did not intervene. On 27 May, the Catholic area was sealed-off by police so that a junior Orange parade could march along the lower end of Garvaghy Road. The march included men in paramilitary uniform.

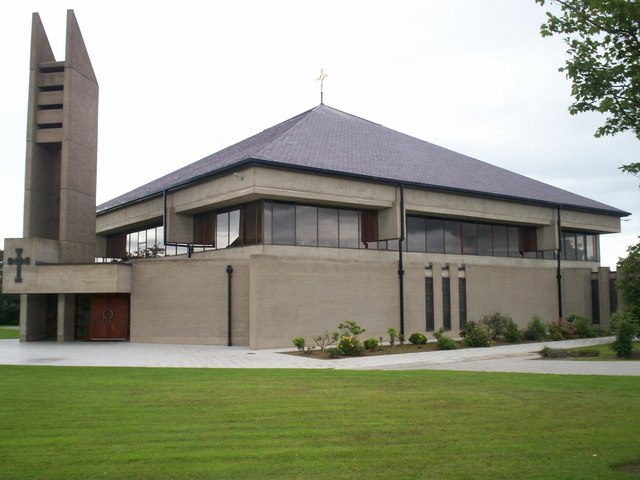
St John's Catholic Church at the northern end of Garvaghy Road

On 30 May, a cross-community concert was held at St John's Catholic Church on Garvaghy Road. It was organized by the youth choir People in Harmony and attended by politicians from both sides, including First Minister David Trimble and Secretary of State Peter Mandelson. Orangemen beat Lambeg drums nearby, trying to drown it out. After the concert, a reception for performers and guests was held at the Protestant Portadown College. About 300 loyalists protested outside the college and threw missiles at police. The attendees had to run a "gauntlet" of sectarian and other abuse from the protesters. David Jones, spokesman for the Portadown Orangemen, said "I am not surprised that there were a number of missiles thrown, taking into account the police treatment of the protesters". On 7 June, a Catholic church on the Battlehill Road was set on fire by arsonists.

On 16 June, Catholic workers at Denny's factory in Portadown walked-out after placards bearing sectarian slogans were erected near the main entrance. The week before, loyalists had thrown missiles at Catholics leaving the factory. The placards were removed shortly after. Later in the month, loyalists sent death threats to workers who were reinforcing the security barrier (or "peace line") along Corcrain Road. The work stopped, leaving the Catholic area vulnerable to attack.

July

In July, it was revealed that members of neo-Nazi group Combat 18 were travelling from England to join the Orangemen at Drumcree. They were given shelter by LVF members in Portadown and Tandragee. That month, Portadown Orangeman Ivan Hewitt, who sported neo-Nazi tattoos, warned in a TV documentary that it may be time for loyalists to "bring their war to Britain".

The 2000 Drumcree march took place on Sunday 2 July. It was again banned from Garvaghy Road, and the Catholic area was sealed off with barricades built by the army. Thousands of loyalists again gathered at Drumcree. Harold Gracey, the head of the Portadown Orangemen, called for protests across Northern Ireland, to over-stretch the police and army. He said:

"This battle is not just about Drumcree. This is about the Orange Order. It is about the Protestant people. They used to be on their knees. Now they are on their bellies. If they don't get up before it is too late this country will be gone."

Gracey added that "we will not tolerate another unelected quango telling us what to do". Mark Harbinson, a Stoneyford Orangeman who was associated with the paramilitary Orange Volunteers, called for militant action and described Drumcree as "Ulster's Alamo". He also declared, "the war begins today".

On Monday 3 July, a group of about fifty loyalists led by Ulster Freedom Fighters (UFF) commander Johnny Adair, marched to police lines at Drumcree with a banner bearing "Shankill Road UFF". The group was a proscribed terrorist organization, and Adair had been convicted of directing terrorism. That evening, in the Corcrain estate, masked LVF gunmen fired a volley in the air for Adair and a cheering crowd. Adair said: "I was in Portadown at the request of the Protestant people and in response to Harold Gracey's comments. Are we going to sit back and let these people trample us into the ground?". On Tuesday 4 July, security forces used water cannon against loyalist rioters at the Drumcree barricade. This was their first deployment in Northern Ireland for 30 years. There were loyalist protests, hijackings and attacks on police in Belfast. The UFF was believed to be behind gun attacks on police in the Shankill district.

In an interview on 7 July, Harold Gracey, the head of the Portadown Orangemen, refused to condemn the days of violence linked to the protests. He said "I am not going to condemn violence because Gerry Adams never condemns violence. If things get out of hand, it's not my fault". Gracey also refused to condemn the attendance at Drumcree of convicted terrorist Johnny Adair. On 9 July, police warned that loyalists had threatened to "kill a Catholic a day" until the Orangemen were allowed to march down Garvaghy Road. Two days later, a group of up to 200 loyalists ordered all shops in Portadown town centre to shut, then tried to march on Garvaghy Road from both ends, but were held back by police. That night, 21 police officers were hurt in clashes with loyalists.

During the 2000 standoff, Robin Eames, the ecclesiastical head of the Anglican Church of Ireland, condemned the Drumcree protests. In a statement on 8 July, he said: "I see nothing of Jesus Christ in the nightly actions on Drumcree hill or on the roads and streets of Northern Ireland night by night. I see nothing of what decent law-abiding members of the Order hold dear in the words of those who call for further protest across the Province". Three days later, in a piece for The Irish Times, Eames wrote: "I am gravely concerned that the Portadown [Orange Order] leadership has not sought to de-escalate the situation at Drumcree and especially when the appearance of individuals and groups with terrorist links has not been declared to be unwelcome". Referring to the loyalist violence surrounding Drumcree, he said that the Portadown Orange leadership "cannot simply wash their hands clean from these attacks".

On 14 July, calls by Portadown Orangemen for another day of widespread protest went unheeded, as the Armagh and Grand Lodges refused to support their calls. Businesses remained open and only several roads were blocked for a short time. The security barriers were removed, and soldiers returned to barracks.

According to the RUC, from 1st to 13th July, across Northern Ireland, there were:

- 330 attacks on security forces (including thirteen shootings), in which 88 RUC officers and soldiers were injured
- 313 petrol bombings
- 99 cases of criminal damage to homes and 86 cases of criminal damage to other buildings
- 417 cases of criminal damage to vehicles
- 105 hijackings

=== 2001 ===
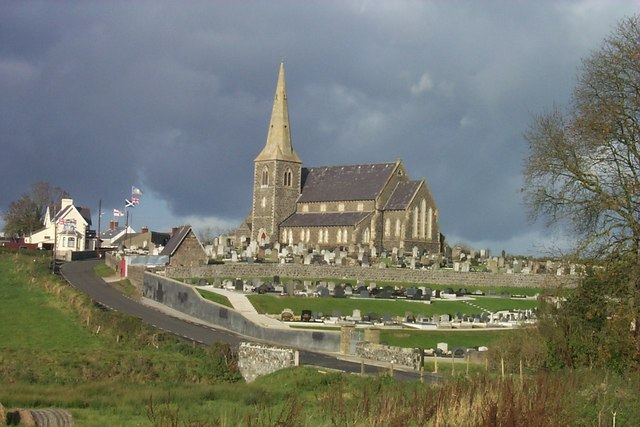
Drumcree Church in 2001

In February 2001, loyalists held protests on the lower Garvaghy Road. The GRRC said that up to 300 people, some masked and armed with clubs, intimidated residents and attacked a car with passengers inside.

In April 2001, the Orangemen held marches and protests to mark 1,000 days of their standoff. This included a march to Downing Street in London, where they handed over a protest letter for prime minister Tony Blair. It referred to the Garvaghy residents as "extreme republicans", saying:

"All over the United Kingdom, various groups are allowed public celebration of their culture and heritage, and if other groups don't like it they have to put up with it. The continuing denial of the rights of the Portadown Orangemen, to satisfy the demands of extreme republicans, is an open invitation to any amount of rabble to interfere with rights of others by agitation and a threat of violence."

On 5 May 2001, about 300 Orangemen and supporters tried to march on to Garvaghy Road but were stopped by police. There were some scuffles between Orangemen and police. Portadown 'District Master', Harold Gracey, drew controversy when he said to police officers: "We know where you come from ... The vast majority of you come from the Protestant community and it is high time that you supported your own Protestant people". On 12 May there were clashes between loyalists and nationalists on Woodhouse Street. On 27 May there were clashes between nationalists and police after a junior Orange march on the lower Garvaghy Road.

Four days before the July 2001 Drumcree march, several hundred members and supporters of the Ulster Defence Association (UDA), a banned loyalist terrorist organization, rallied at Drumcree in support of the Orangemen. They flew UDA and UFF flags and marched to the British Army cordon. David Jones, spokesman for the Portadown Orangemen, said that they welcomed any support as long as it was peaceful. Bríd Rodgers, a local SDLP politician, called this an example of the Orangemen's "double standards". She said the Orangemen would not speak to the GRRC because of Mac Cionnaith's "terrorist past", yet they are "quite happy to associate with people who have a terrorist present". The march passed off peacefully under a heavy security presence.

== 2002–2025: Reduced tensions ==
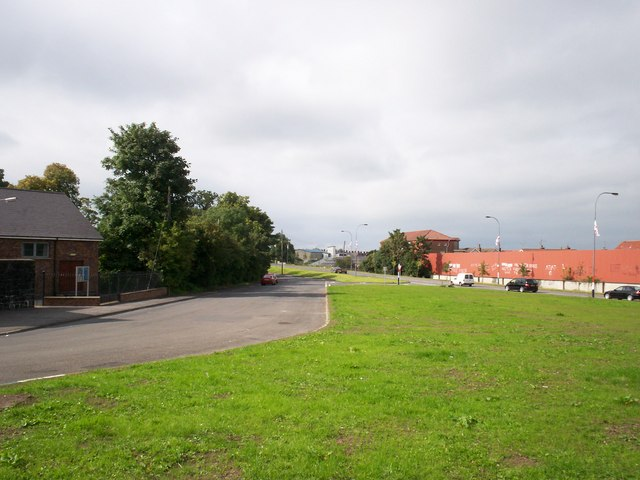
The "peace line" (right) along Corcrain Road, seen from the loyalist side, 2007

Since July 1998, the Orangemen have applied, unsuccessfully, to march the "traditional route" every Sunday of the year – both the outward leg along Obins Street (which has been banned since 1986) and the return leg along Garvaghy Road. They also held a small protest at Drumcree Church every Sunday.

In 2002, the Orangemen again attempted to march the route from Drumcree Church, despite being barred by the Parades Commission. Orangemen in sashes attacked Police Service of Northern Ireland (PSNI) officers blocking their path. Twenty-four PSNI officers were injured in the clashes and police responded with plastic bullets. Eight arrests were made.

Over the following two decades, Drumcree was relatively calm, with outside support for the Portadown lodges' campaign appearing to fade, and violence waning. Mac Cionnaith said in this period that he believed the conflict was over. The Orange Order continued to campaign for the right to march on Garvaghy Road.

In late July 2024, the Portadown Orangemen submitted an application to march down the Garvaghy Road during the 2024 All-Ireland Senior Football Championship final, in which Armagh were to compete, stating that the parade would "bring the least impact on the majority of the community that live there", because most would be watching the football match. The application was denied by the Parades Commission.

== 2026: Renewed dispute ==
=== May – July ===
In May 2026, the Portadown Orangemen tried to prevent bilingual Irish-English street signs being installed near Corcrain Orange Hall, which is in the mainly-Catholic/Irish nationalist area. The Orangemen said that including Irish on the signs would make Protestants and unionists feel "intimidated and threatened". In the borough, bilingual street signage may be put up if two-thirds of residents approve. In this case, over two-thirds of residents living on the streets supported the bilingual signs. Local Sinn Féin and Alliance councillors approved, with Sinn Féin councillor Paul Duffy saying the objections were based on anti-Irish intolerance and ignored the wishes of residents. They were approved by the local planning committee, with two Unionist councillors voting against.

On 6 June 2026, the Ireland Palestine Solidarity Campaign (IPSC) held a sponsored walk from Lurgan to Newry for humanitarian aid to Gaza. Unionist residents and politicians sought to block it from the village of Scarva, calling it an unwanted "republican march" that would cause disruption, disorder, and harm community relations. Democratic Unionist Party (DUP) representatives, including the local MP Carla Lockhart, issued a statement saying:

"Residents are entitled to go about their daily lives without unnecessary disruption from what is widely viewed as a deliberately provocative parade which serves no legitimate purpose within the area. We strongly impressed upon the Commission that the protection of community relations and public order must come before facilitating a deeply divisive demonstration".

The Parades Commission allowed the procession to go along a towpath, but banned it from entering the village and imposed other restrictions. It also allowed a counter-protest. Portadown Orangemen attended the counter-protest, as did Carla Lockhart. She was criticised for standing alongside a crowd of masked men who waved Israeli flags and shouted sectarian, racist and misogynistic abuse at the walkers.

Lockhart and the Portadown Orangemen argued that, because the IPSC walk was allowed to go ahead despite unionist opposition, the Orange Order should also be allowed to march on Garvaghy Road.

The 2026 Drumcree parade was due to be held on Sunday 5 July. The Parades Commission again barred the Portadown Orangemen from marching along Obins Street and the Garvaghy Road during the yearly parade. As in previous years, the parade was allowed to go along Corcrain Road to Drumcree Church, and either go back into town the same way, or finish at the church. The Commission said that marching the Garvaghy Road "would have a negative impact on community relations and would cause significant disruption". It added that it "cannot ignore the terrible events of the past that led to fatalities and serious injuries to large numbers of people" due to the dispute. The Commission concluded that its decision to restrict the parade was "necessary, proportionate and fair", balancing the human rights of the residents with the right of the marchers to freedom of assembly.

Portadown District Orange Lodge, which said it has over 850 members, re-stated its view that the ban was "an unjustified infringement of their rights". Residents' representatives "reminded the Commission of the history of serious violence, deaths and injuries linked to the Drumcree dispute". They highlighted the large number of Orange and loyalist parades that are already held in Portadown every summer, and said that there is an alternative return route. The Commission acknowledged the "real" sense of grievance felt by Orangemen and the sense of trauma among residents.

=== August – October ===
The Orangemen made a legal challenge against the Parades Commission's decision. Loyalist activist Jamie Bryson was involved in bringing the case. He said that loyalists could achieve more by using the law as a weapon rather than rioting.

In August 2026, the High Court overturned the Parades Commission's decision to ban the Orange Order from marching on Garvaghy Road. The judge found that the Commission had not followed its own rules and procedures, and because of those errors, the court quashed their decision.

The Orangemen, unionist politicians and supporters hailed the ruling and called for the Commission to resign. DUP politician Lockhart called it a "victory for unionism and loyalism", while Traditional Unionist Voice (TUV) leader Jim Allister said the Commission had been "caught out". Bryson said "This is a vital staging post in the culture war, and a repudiation of all those who said Drumcree was finished. It is firmly back on the agenda".

The ruling did not allow the march to go ahead, as a new application would have to be made. Nigel Dawson, the District Master of the Portadown Orangemen, said they would apply to parade on Garvaghy Road soon. Irish nationalist politicians and the residents warned against rekindling the dispute.

==== September escalation ====
Following the High Court ruling, which severely criticised the Parades Commission, the Orange Order applied for a march on Garvaghy Road on 27 September, during Orange Heritage Week. The Portadown Orangemen saw this march as a first step, saying that "a final and lasting settlement to the Drumcree issue" could only be achieved when the full march, with all members and bands, is allowed along Garvaghy Road. The Garvaghy Road Residents' Coalition issued a statement:

"Those who insist on the presence of an annual Orange march along Garvaghy Road must accept the reality that this issue has already been settled. It has resulted in peace and progress ... for 28 years. Peace and progress are not problems which require a solution. ... Unlike the Orange Order and its political allies, we also remember the 21 people – members of our immediate local community, and those of other communities – who were murdered across the North by those acting in support of the Orange Order at Drumcree".

On 25 September, the Parades Commission approved the Orange Order parade on Garvaghy Road for 27 September. It was the first time in 28 years that the Order had been permitted to parade on the road. The approval limited the parade to 35 Orangemen, required an 8 am start, and set a 9.30 am dispersal. No bands or supporters would be allowed, and no flags or banners would be allowed other than the Orangemen's 'Portadown District' banner. It would be the first Orange march on Garvaghy Road in September, as the traditional 'Drumcree Sunday' parade is in July.

On 26 September, the Garvaghy Road Residents' Coalition (GRRC) lodged a legal challenge against the decision. They suggested the Parades Commission had been misled about the potential disorder and said they would organise a protest of 5,000 people. That afternoon, the Belfast High Court issued a temporary injunction stopping the parade. The judge urged the parties to "step back from the abyss" and said "this long-running dispute has the potential to escalate". The Orange Order appealed, which was upheld that evening. The case was returned to the High Court, where a late night sitting was held before a new judge. At 2.15 am, less than six hours before the planned parade, the judge ruled that it could go ahead. Breandan Mac Cionnaith of the Garvaghy Road Residents' Coalition said: "There's no such thing as justice or rights for our community. I'm going back to help defend my community."

Protestors gathered at the mouth of Drumcree Road into the north end of Garvaghy Road on 27 September.

13:07, PSNI Crimestopper vehicles were positioned further up the road (top right)

21:15, police presence reduced, number of protestors remained high.

Large crowds gathered to protest on the Garvaghy Road around midnight, with thousands standing on the road overnight into 27 September. Police arrived in armoured Land Rovers and repeatedly warned the protesters by loudspeaker that they were breaking the law. At 8 am, the PSNI stopped the Orangemen at Drumcree Church, saying they could not facilitate the march due to protesters blocking Garvaghy Road. Police said that removing at least "1,000 people from the Garvaghy Road, including women, children and older people, would have required such a significant use of force that public safety would have been significantly jeopardised, people seriously hurt and disorder inevitable". The protesters were joined by Irish nationalist politicians, including First Minister Michelle O'Neill, Sinn Féin president Mary Lou McDonald, and SDLP leader Claire Hanna. O'Neill said "The Garvaghy Road residents deserve to live free from sectarian harassment and intimidation". MP Carla Lockhart called the thousands of protesters "an absolute rabble" and accused O'Neill of unlawfully protesting and leading chants.

Protesters continued blocking Garvaghy Road throughout 27 September, at times standing in heavy rain and linking arms. The crowd was joined by more Irish nationalist politicians, including former Sinn Féin president Gerry Adams. The Orangemen tried to march several times but were stopped by police. Officers approached the Garvaghy Road protesters to negotiate, but they declined. Later, one protester threw a bottle at police, but others told him to stop. A large group of loyalists joined the Orangemen at Drumcree; the police said this was a breach of the Parades Commission determination.

Protesters were encouraged to stay on the road until at least midnight. Around midnight, Mac Cionnaith told the crowd they had won a "victory" by preventing the march, saying he would meet the Northern Ireland Secretary Chris Bryant and PSNI Chief Constable Jon Boutcher the following morning for talks. Mac Cionnaith said he had been given "commitments" that the march would not take place overnight and asked for 20–30 volunteers to stay to ensure those assurances were upheld. At around 4 am on Monday 28 September, the Orangemen again tried to march but were blocked by police vehicles.

Mac Cionnaith and legal adviser Darragh Mackin held talks with Bryant at Hillsborough Castle on 28 September. Mac Cionnaith said that Bryant wanted mediation and "we have absolutely no problem with mediation", but added that the "community has no confidence in the Orange Order". Orangemen were again stopped by police at Drumcree. Later that day, several hundred protesters gathered on the Garvaghy Road at the junction with Drumcree Road for another day of demonstrations. Police remained at Drumcree Church, where loyalist counter‑protesters had gathered.

On 29 September, as protests continued, further talks took place involving Mac Cionnaith, the Order, and Bryant. After the talks, Mac Cionnaith said the coalition had received a document from the secretary of state and added that "if it's accepted by the Orange Order it'll be accepted by us". Later that day, Lockhart said that the proposal was "not acceptable" and that the Portadown district would not accept a deal in which it walked away.

==== October ====
The rally on the Garvaghy Road on 3 October 2026.

On 1 October, Bryant said the talks had ended without agreement, adding that "my door remains open". On 3 October, thousands of people gathered at a rally on the Garvaghy Road in support of the residents, while a separate rally drew a large crowd in support of the Portadown District Orange Lodge. A further legal challenge to stop the march brought by the residents was heard on 5 October in the Court of Appeal, where judgment was reserved. A letter supporting the residents was sent to Bryant and was signed by public figures including Noel Gallagher, Susan Sarandon, Adrian Dunbar, Paul Weller, Siobhán McSweeney, Johnny Marr and others, while a separate letter was sent by members of the Protestant community.

On 9 October, Bryant banned the march after the PSNI chief constable advised that it could not go ahead without a "major intervention". In response, the Portadown Orange District said the chief constable had "abdicated responsibility" and that Bryant had "bowed to a republican mob". Orangemen later sought a judicial review of the decision. On 24 October, the Portadown District held a parade and rally in the town centre in support of the Orangemen. Twenty-nine bands took part, and several thousand people attended. On 28 October, the High Court upheld Bryant's decision, with Mr Justice Scoffield ruling that it was "lawful".

== See also ==
- Battle of Cable Street – 1936 anti-fascist confrontation in London
- Orange riots (disambiguation)
- Orange Volunteers – Small Ulster paramilitary group in Northern Ireland
- The Troubles in Portadown – Conflict in Portadown, Northern Ireland
