= Ballymoney Times =

Northern Irish newspaper

The Ballymoney Times is a regional newspaper published for the north-east area of Northern Ireland, which included the town of Ballymoney, County Antrim.

It is part of the Morton Newspapers Group and was established in 1990 by Lyle McMullan, formerly editor of the Ballymena Times.
