= Crossmore (District Electoral Area) =

District electoral areas in Armagh, Northern Ireland

Crossmore DEA (1993-2014) within Armagh

Crossmore was one of the four district electoral areas in Armagh, Northern Ireland which existed from 1985 to 2014. The district elected five members to Armagh City and District Council, and formed part of the Newry and Armagh constituencies for the Northern Ireland Assembly and UK Parliament.

It was created for the 1985 local elections, replacing Armagh Area C which had existed since 1973, and contained the wards of Carriagatuke, Derrynoose, Keady, Killylea and Milford. It was abolished for the 2014 local elections and largely moved into the Armagh DEA.

== Councillors ==
Election	Councillor (party)	Councillor (party)	Councillor (party)	Councillor (party)	Councillor (party)
2011	Mary Doyle (Sinn Féin)	Darren McNally (Sinn Féin)	Thomas O'Hanlon (SDLP)	Gerald Mallon (SDLP)	Mavis Eagle (UUP)
2005	Cathal Boylan (Sinn Féin)	Pat O'Rawe (Sinn Féin)	Thomas O'Hanlon (SDLP)	Gerald Mallon (SDLP)	Noel Donnelly (DUP)
2001	Brian Cunningham (Sinn Féin)	Pat O'Rawe (Sinn Féin)	Thomas Kavanagh (SDLP)	James McKernan (SDLP)	Evelyn Corry (UUP)
1997	Brian Cunningham (Sinn Féin)	James McGleenan (SDLP)	Thomas Kavanagh (SDLP)	James McKernan (SDLP)	Evelyn Corry (UUP)
1993	James Lennon (SDLP)	James McGleenan (SDLP)	Thomas Kavanagh (SDLP)	James McKernan (SDLP)	Jim Nicholson (UUP)
1989	Thomas Shilliday (UUP)	Charles Mallon (SDLP)	Thomas Kavanagh (SDLP)	James McKernan (SDLP)	Jim Nicholson (UUP)
1985	Thomas Shilliday (UUP)	Charles Mallon (SDLP)	Thomas McArdle (SDLP)	James McKernan (SDLP)	Jim Nicholson (UUP)

== 2011 election ==
2005: 2 x SDLP, 2 x Sinn Féin, 1 x DUP

2011: 2 x SDLP, 2 x Sinn Féin, 1 x UUP

2005-2011 change: UUP gain from DUP

Crossmore - 5 seats
Party	Candidate	FPv%	Count			
Party	Candidate	FPv%	1	2	3	4
SDLP	Thomas O'Hanlon*	27.55%	1,620			
Sinn Féin	Mary Doyle	19.72%	1,160			
SDLP	Gerald Mallon*	10.97%	645	1,141.02		
Sinn Féin	Darren McNally	14.76%	868	998.2		
UUP	Mavis Eagle	14.35%	844	849.88	907.88	935.6
DUP	Noel Donnelly*	12.65%	744	746.94	796.94	821.72
Electorate: 9,268 Valid: 5,881 (63.45%) Spoilt: 129 Quota: 981 Turnout: 6,010 (64.85%)

== 2005 election ==
2001: 2 x Sinn Féin, 2 x SDLP, 1 x UUP

2005: 2 x Sinn Féin, 2 x SDLP, 1 x DUP

2001-2005 change: DUP gain from UUP

Crossmore - 5 seats
Party	Candidate	FPv%	Count				
Party	Candidate	FPv%	1	2	3	4	5
Sinn Féin	Cathal Boylan	14.09%	864	898	1,374		
SDLP	Thomas O'Hanlon	14.54%	891	982	1,025		
Sinn Féin	Pat O'Rawe*	13.87%	850	876	991	1,332.11	
SDLP	Gerald Mallon	9.87%	605	964	974	981.7	1,031.75
DUP	Noel Donnelly	15.04%	922	923	924	924	925.54
UUP	Billy Morton	13.21%	810	818	819	819	821.31
Sinn Féin	Willie Monaghan	10.49%	643	661			
SDLP	James Lennon	8.89%	545				
Electorate: 8,579 Valid: 6,130 (71.45%) Spoilt: 115 Quota: 1,022 Turnout: 6,245 (72.79%)

== 2001 election ==
1997: 3 x SDLP, 1 x Sinn Féin, 1 x UUP

2001: 2 x SDLP, 2 x Sinn Féin, 1 x DUP

1997-2001 change: Sinn Féin gain from SDLP

Crossmore - 5 seats
Party	Candidate	FPv%	Count						
Party	Candidate	FPv%	1	2	3	4	5	6	7
Sinn Féin	Brian Cunningham*	19.77%	1,336						
SDLP	Thomas Kavanagh*	14.63%	989	1,032.84	1,366.84				
SDLP	James McKernan*	10.40%	703	704.92	751.88	862.64	1,366.64		
Sinn Féin	Pat O'Rawe	12.83%	867	1,010.36	1,030.8	1,045.62	1,114.78	1,212.78	
UUP	Evelyn Corry*	13.72%	927	927.32	927.32	927.32	934	950	974
DUP	Noel Berry	13.76%	930	930.16	930.16	930.16	933.16	933.16	935.16
SDLP	James Lennon	8.20%	554	558.8	609.68	722			
SDLP	Joe McGleenan	6.69%	452	464.32					
Electorate: 8,488 Valid: 6,758 (79.61%) Spoilt: 125 Quota: 1,127 Turnout: 6,883 (81.09%)

== 1997 election ==
1993: 4 x SDLP, 1 x UUP

1997: 3 x SDLP, 1 x UUP, 1 x Sinn Féin

1993-1997 change: Sinn Féin gain from SDLP

Crossmore - 5 seats
Party	Candidate	FPv%	Count				
Party	Candidate	FPv%	1	2	3	4	5
Sinn Féin	Brian Cunningham	19.78%	1,207				
UUP	Evelyn Corry	18.60%	1,135				
SDLP	Thomas Kavanagh*	18.14%	1,107				
SDLP	James McGleenan*	8.75%	534	608.36	608.66	654.66	1,070.66
SDLP	James McKernan*	14.13%	862	902.48	903.58	908.78	1,029.36
UUP	William Hamilton	12.24%	747	748.98	859.18	859.42	863.06
SDLP	James Lennon*	8.34%	509	577.64	577.84	610.64	
Electorate: 8,121 Valid: 6,101 (75.13%) Spoilt: 93 Quota: 1,017 Turnout: 6,194 (76.27%)

== 1993 election ==
1989: 3 x SDLP, 2 x UUP

1993: 4 x SDLP, 1 x UUP

1989-1993 change: SDLP gain from UUP

Crossmore - 5 seats
Party	Candidate	FPv%	Count		
Party	Candidate	FPv%	1	2	3
SDLP	Thomas Kavanagh*	22.87%	1,379		
SDLP	James McKernan*	17.05%	1,028		
UUP	Jim Nicholson*	16.75%	1,010		
SDLP	James Lennon	10.93%	659	800.68	954.72
SDLP	James McGleenan	8.86%	534	717.68	919.92
UUP	William Hamilton	14.23%	858	859.12	869.52
Sinn Féin	Brian Cunningham	9.32%	562	597.56	
Electorate: 7,741 Valid: 6,030 (77.90%) Spoilt: 126 Quota: 1,006 Turnout: 6,156 (79.52%)

== 1989 election ==
1985: 3 x SDLP, 2 x UUP

1989: 3 x SDLP, 2 x UUP

1985-1989 change: No change

Crossmore - 5 seats
Party	Candidate	FPv%	Count		
Party	Candidate	FPv%	1	2	3
UUP	Jim Nicholson*	28.29%	1,484		
SDLP	Thomas Kavanagh	22.15%	1,162		
SDLP	James McKernan*	19.85%	1,041		
UUP	Thomas Shilliday*	8.39%	440	1,036.96	
SDLP	Charles Mallon*	12.26%	643	643.82	897.57
Sinn Féin	Thomas Carroll	9.06%	475	475	499.25
Electorate: 7,295 Valid: 5,245 (71.90%) Spoilt: 158 Quota: 875 Turnout: 5,403 (74.06%)

== 1985 election ==
1985: 3 x SDLP, 2 x UUP

Crossmore - 5 seats
Party	Candidate	FPv%	Count			
Party	Candidate	FPv%	1	2	3	4
SDLP	Charles Mallon	22.41%	1,072			
UUP	Jim Nicholson*	19.84%	949			
SDLP	James McKernan*	18.58%	889			
SDLP	Thomas McArdle	17.50%	837			
UUP	Thomas Shilliday	10.72%	513	541	667.88	690.88
DUP	Joseph McBride*	10.95%	524	580	603.36	611.36
Electorate: 7,459 Valid: 4,784 (64.14%) Spoilt: 137 Quota: 798 Turnout: 4,921 (65.97%)
