= The Orchard (District Electoral Area) =

District electoral areas in Armagh, Northern Ireland

The Orchard DEA (1993-2014) within Armagh

The Orchard was one of the four district electoral areas in Armagh, Northern Ireland which existed from 1985 to 2014. The district elected five members to Armagh City and District Council, and formed part of the Newry and Armagh constituencies for the Northern Ireland Assembly and UK Parliament.

It was created for the 1985 local elections, replacing Armagh Area A which had existed since 1973, and contained the wards of Ballymartrim, Charlemont, Hockley, Loughgall and Rich Hill. It was abolished for the 2014 local elections and largely moved into the Cusher DEA.

== Councillors ==
Election	Councillor (Party)	Councillor (Party)	Councillor (Party)	Councillor (Party)	Councillor (Party)
2011	John Campbell (SDLP)	Gerard White (Sinn Féin)	Jim Speers (UUP)	Joy Rollston (UUP)	William Irwin (DUP)
2005	John Campbell (SDLP)	Paul Corrigan (Sinn Féin)	Jim Speers (UUP)	Charles Rollston (UUP)	William Irwin (DUP)
2001	John Campbell (SDLP)	Paul Corrigan (Sinn Féin)	Jim Speers (UUP)	Charles Rollston (UUP)	Brian Hutchinson (DUP)
1997	John Campbell (SDLP)	Olive Whitten (UUP)	Jim Speers (UUP)	Charles Rollston (UUP)	Brian Hutchinson (DUP)
1993	John Kernan (SDLP)	Olive Whitten (UUP)	Jim Speers (UUP)	Charles Rollston (UUP)	Brian Hutchinson (DUP)
1989	John Kernan (SDLP)	Olive Whitten (UUP)	Jim Speers (UUP)	Samuel Foster (UUP)	Douglas Hutchinson (DUP)
1985	Christopher McAnallen (SDLP)	Ronald Allen (UUP)	Jim Speers (UUP)	Samuel Foster (UUP)	Douglas Hutchinson (DUP)

== 2011 Election ==
2005: 2 x UUP, 1 x DUP, 1 x Sinn Féin, 1 x SDLP

2011: 2 x UUP, 1 x DUP, 1 x Sinn Féin, 1 x SDLP

2005-2011 Change: No change

The Orchard - 5 seats
Party	Candidate	FPv%	Count				
Party	Candidate	FPv%	1	2	3	4	5
DUP	William Irwin*	24.46%	1,520				
Sinn Féin	Gerard White	19.55%	1,215				
UUP	Jim Speers*	19.42%	1,207				
SDLP	John Campbell*	15.11%	939	944.12	946.76	1,115.56	
UUP	Joy Rollston	11.65%	724	828.64	904.44	905.24	1,054.19
DUP	Philip Weir	7.48%	465	814.12	863.32	864.72	886.47
TUV	Paul Coleman	2.32%	144	154.56			
Electorate: 9,928 Valid: 6,214 (62.59%) Spoilt: 79 Quota: 1,036 Turnout: 6,293 (63.39%)

== 2005 Election ==
2001: 2 x UUP, 1 x DUP, 1 x Sinn Féin, 1 x SDLP

2005: 2 x UUP, 1 x DUP, 1 x Sinn Féin, 1 x SDLP

2001-2005 Change: No change

The Orchard - 5 seats
Party	Candidate	FPv%	Count				
Party	Candidate	FPv%	1	2	3	4	5
DUP	William Irwin	28.02%	1,809				
UUP	Jim Speers*	18.88%	1,219				
Sinn Féin	Paul Corrigan*	18.49%	1,194				
SDLP	John Campbell*	17.59%	1,136				
UUP	Charles Rollston*	11.12%	718	845.1	973.14	1,072.34	1,123
DUP	Robert Steenson	5.90%	381	982.47	995.79	1,013.39	1,018.66
Electorate: 9,140 Valid: 6,457 (70.65%) Spoilt: 95 Quota: 1,077 Turnout: 6,552 (71.68%)

== 2001 Election ==
1997: 3 x UUP, 1 x DUP, 1 x SDLP

2001: 2 x UUP, 1 x DUP, 1 x Sinn Féin, 1 x SDLP

1997-2001 Change: Sinn Féin gain from UUP

The Orchard - 5 seats
Party	Candidate	FPv%	Count				
Party	Candidate	FPv%	1	2	3	4	5
DUP	Brian Hutchinson*	18.99%	1,363				
UUP	Jim Speers*	18.45%	1,324				
Sinn Féin	Paul Corrigan	17.01%	1,221				
SDLP	John Campbell*	11.09%	796	796.48	797.48	798.08	1,407.08
UUP	Charles Rollston*	8.99%	645	653.88	1,056.16	1,164.66	1,174.28
DUP	William Irwin	9.56%	686	831.92	898.12	914.42	919.52
SDLP	Eamon McNeill	9.07%	651	651.24	656.24	657.14	
UUP	Olive Whitten*	6.85%	492	497.16			
Electorate: 9,234 Valid: 7,178 (77.73%) Spoilt: 117 Quota: 1,197 Turnout: 7,295 (79.00%)

== 1997 Election ==
1993: 3 x UUP, 1 x DUP, 1 x SDLP

1997: 3 x UUP, 1 x DUP, 1 x SDLP

1993-1997 Change: No change

The Orchard - 5 seats
Party	Candidate	FPv%	Count			
Party	Candidate	FPv%	1	2	3	4
UUP	Jim Speers*	26.38%	1,630			
DUP	Brian Hutchinson*	16.36%	1,011	1,119.78		
UUP	Charles Rollston*	13.53%	836	1,061.33		
UUP	Olive Whitten*	9.92%	613	873.85	960.3	
SDLP	John Campbell	14.27%	882	883.11	883.46	1,205.46
SDLP	Eamon McNeill	10.18%	629	631.22	632.62	717.62
Sinn Féin	Elizabeth Gartland	9.35%	578	578	578	
Electorate: 8,976 Valid: 6,179 (68.84%) Spoilt: 80 Quota: 1,030 Turnout: 6,259 (69.73%)

== 1993 Election ==
1989: 3 x UUP, 1 x SDLP, 1 x DUP

1993: 3 x UUP, 1 x SDLP, 1 x DUP

1989-1993 Change: No change

The Orchard - 5 seats
Party	Candidate	FPv%	Count		
Party	Candidate	FPv%	1	2	3
UUP	Jim Speers*	27.66%	1,620		
SDLP	John Kernan*	24.08%	1,410		
DUP	Brian Hutchinson	20.05%	1,174		
UUP	Charles Rollston	12.79%	749	991	
UUP	Olive Whitten*	9.48%	555	940.2	985.95
Sinn Féin	Brendan Casey	5.94%	348	348.8	733.55
Electorate: 8,581 Valid: 5,856 (68.24%) Spoilt: 93 Quota: 977 Turnout: 5,949 (69.33%)

== 1989 Election ==
1985: 3 x UUP, 1 x SDLP, 1 x DUP

1989: 3 x UUP, 1 x SDLP, 1 x DUP

1985-1989 Change: No change

The Orchard - 5 seats
Party	Candidate	FPv%	Count			
Party	Candidate	FPv%	1	2	3	4
UUP	Jim Speers*	28.95%	1,665			
SDLP	John Kernan	20.92%	1,203			
UUP	Samuel Foster*	14.87%	855	1,179.24		
DUP	Douglas Hutchinson*	16.52%	950	1,081.88		
UUP	Olive Whitten	11.77%	677	910.52	928	1,147.9
Sinn Féin	Brendan Casey	6.97%	401	401	625.02	625.02
Electorate: 8,056 Valid: 5,751 (71.39%) Spoilt: 111 Quota: 959 Turnout: 5,862 (72.77%)

== 1985 Election ==
1985: 3 x UUP, 1 x SDLP, 1 x DUP

The Orchard - 5 seats
Party	Candidate	FPv%	Count					
Party	Candidate	FPv%	1	2	3	4	5	6
UUP	Jim Speers*	21.13%	1,189					
DUP	Douglas Hutchinson*	20.44%	1,150					
UUP	Ronald Allen*	15.55%	875	972.23				
UUP	Samuel Foster*	12.02%	676	823.21	1,027.81			
SDLP	Christopher McAnallen	10.88%	612	612.63	612.83	626.43	783.63	794.34
SDLP	Francis McIlvanna*	10.29%	579	579.84	580.04	584.64	771.04	773.14
Sinn Féin	Brigid McCartan	9.69%	545	545	546.4	546.6		
Electorate: 7,682 Valid: 5,626 (73.24%) Spoilt: 92 Quota: 938 Turnout: 5,718 (74.43%)
