= 2011 Armagh City and District Council election =

Local govt election in Northern Ireland

- 5 May 2011

All 22 seats to Armagh City and District Council 12 seats needed for a majority
	First party	Second party	Third party
Party	UUP	Sinn Féin	SDLP
Seats won	6	6	5
Seat change	▲1	▲1	▼1
	Fourth party	Fifth party
Party	DUP	Independent
Seats won	4	1
Seat change	▼2	▲1
- Party with the most votes by district.

Elections to Armagh City and District Council were held on 5 May 2011 on the same day as the other Northern Irish local government elections. The election used four district electoral areas to elect a total of 22 councillors.

== Election results ==
Armagh City and District Council Election Result 2011
Party	Seats	Gains	Losses	Net gain/loss	Seats %	Votes %	Votes	+/−
UUP	6	1	0	▲1	27.3	27.6	6,972	▲4.9
Sinn Féin	6	1	0	▲1	27.3	24.8	6,259	▲1.7
SDLP	5	0	1	▼1	22.7	21.3	5,379	▲0.1
DUP	4	0	2	▼2	18.2	21.1	5,326	▼8.5
Independent	1	1	0	▲1	4.5	4.5	1,136	▲1.1
TUV	0	0	0	0	0.0	0.6	144	New

Note: "Votes" are the first preference votes.

== Districts summary ==
Results of the Armagh City and District Council election, 2011 by district
Ward	%	Cllrs	%	Cllrs	%	Cllrs	%	Cllrs	%	Cllrs	Total Cllrs
Ward	UUP		Sinn Féin		SDLP		DUP		Others		Total Cllrs
Armagh City	16.8	1	45.1	3	25.1	1	13.0	1	0.0	0	6
Crossmore	14.4	1	34.5	2	38.5	2	12.7	0	0.0	0	5
Cusher	42.5	2	7.6	0	10.6	1	24.5	2	14.8	1	6
The Orchard	31.1	2	19.6	1	15.1	1	31.9	1	2.3	0	5
Total	27.6	6	24.8	6	21.3	5	21.1	4	5.2	1	22

== District results ==
=== Armagh City ===
2005: 2 x Sinn Féin, 2 x SDLP, 1 x UUP, 1 x DUP
2011: 3 x Sinn Féin, 1 x SDLP, 1 x UUP, 1 x DUP
2005-2011 Change: Sinn Féin gain from SDLP

Armagh City - 6 seats
Party	Candidate	FPv%	Count				
Party	Candidate	FPv%	1	2	3	4	5
Sinn Féin	Cathy Rafferty*	18.62%	1,001				
UUP	Sylvia McRoberts*	16.78%	902				
Sinn Féin	Noel Sheridan*	16.09%	865				
DUP	Freda Donnelly*	12.98%	698	698.72	806.56		
Sinn Féin	Roy McCartney	10.40%	559	743.08	744.36	816.74	
SDLP	Mealla Campbell*	13.02%	700	724.96	732.64	743.2	757.94
SDLP	Pat Brannigan*	12.13%	652	670.72	686.08	694.55	705.88
Electorate: 9,993 Valid: 5,377 (53.81%) Spoilt: 127 Quota: 769 Turnout: 5,504 (55.08%)

=== Crossmore ===
2005: 2 x SDLP, 2 x Sinn Féin, 1 x DUP
2011: 2 x SDLP, 2 x Sinn Féin, 1 x UUP
2005-2011 Change: UUP gain from DUP

Crossmore - 5 seats
Party	Candidate	FPv%	Count			
Party	Candidate	FPv%	1	2	3	4
SDLP	Thomas O'Hanlon*	27.55%	1,620			
Sinn Féin	Mary Doyle	19.72%	1,160			
SDLP	Gerald Mallon*	10.97%	645	1,141.02		
Sinn Féin	Darren McNally	14.76%	868	998.2		
UUP	Mavis Eagle	14.35%	844	849.88	907.88	935.6
DUP	Noel Donnelly*	12.65%	744	746.94	796.94	821.72
Electorate: 9,268 Valid: 5,881 (63.45%) Spoilt: 129 Quota: 981 Turnout: 6,010 (64.85%)

=== Cusher ===
2005: 3 x DUP, 2 x UUP, 1 x SDLP
2011: 2 x UUP, 2 x DUP, 1 x SDLP, 1 x Independent
2005-2011 Change: Independent gain from DUP

Cusher - 6 seats
Party	Candidate	FPv%	Count					
Party	Candidate	FPv%	1	2	3	4	5	6
UUP	Gordon Kennedy	23.05%	1,785					
Independent	Paul Berry*	14.67%	1,136					
UUP	Robert Turner*	12.19%	944	1,138.61				
SDLP	Sharon Haughey*	10.63%	823	834.7	835.3	842.69	1,271.69	
DUP	Terry McWilliams	10.37%	803	903.62	906.44	1,038.61	1,040	1,052
DUP	Gareth Wilson*	7.68%	595	625.03	627.97	986.33	988.33	992.33
UUP	John Moore	7.31%	566	847.97	867.89	903.64	903.64	925.64
Sinn Féin	Liam Lappin	7.63%	591	591.39	591.39	591.39		
DUP	Philip Murdock	6.47%	501	550.53	552.33			
Electorate: 12,337 Valid: 7,744 (62.77%) Spoilt: 146 Quota: 1,107 Turnout: 7,890 (63.95%)

=== The Orchard ===
2005: 2 x UUP, 1 x DUP, 1 x Sinn Féin, 1 x SDLP
2011: 2 x UUP, 1 x DUP, 1 x Sinn Féin, 1 x SDLP
2005-2011 Change: No change

The Orchard - 5 seats
Party	Candidate	FPv%	Count				
Party	Candidate	FPv%	1	2	3	4	5
DUP	William Irwin*	24.46%	1,520				
Sinn Féin	Gerard White	19.55%	1,215				
UUP	Jim Speers*	19.42%	1,207				
SDLP	John Campbell*	15.11%	939	944.12	946.76	1,115.56	
UUP	Joy Rollston	11.65%	724	828.64	904.44	905.24	1,054.19
DUP	Philip Weir	7.48%	465	814.12	863.32	864.72	886.47
TUV	Paul Coleman	2.32%	144	154.56			
Electorate: 9,928 Valid: 6,214 (62.59%) Spoilt: 79 Quota: 1,036 Turnout: 6,293 (63.39%)
