= Cusher (District Electoral Area) =

District electoral area in Northern Ireland

- Armagh City, Banbridge and Craigavon Borough Council DEA constituency

Current constituency
- Created: 1985
- Seats: 6 (1985-2014); 5 (2014-)
- Councillors: Paul Berry (IND); Adam Copeland (DUP); Bróna Haughey (SF); Gordon Kennedy (UUP); Keith Ratcliffe (TUV)

Cusher DEA within Armagh City, Banbridge and Craigavon

Cusher DEA (1993-2014) within Armagh

Cusher is one of the seven district electoral areas (DEA) in Armagh City, Banbridge and Craigavon, Northern Ireland. The district elects five members to Armagh City, Banbridge and Craigavon Borough Council and contains the wards of Hamiltonsbawn, Markethill, Richhill, Seagahan and Tandragee. Armagh forms part of the Newry and Armagh constituencies for the Northern Ireland Assembly and UK Parliament.

It was created for the 1985 local elections, replacing Armagh Area B which had existed since 1973, where it contained six wards (Hamiltonsbawn, Killeen, Laurelvale, Markethill, Poyntz Pass and Tandragee). For the 2014 local elections it was reduced by one ward but gained most of the abolished The Orchard DEA.

== Councillors ==
Election	Councillor (Party)	Councillor (Party)	Councillor (Party)	Councillor (Party)	Councillor (Party)	Councillor (Party)
January 2026 Co-Option	Bróna Haughey (Sinn Féin)	Keith Ratcliffe (TUV)	Gordon Kennedy (UUP)	Adam Copeland (DUP)	Paul Berry (Independent)/ (DUP)	5 seats 2014–present
2023	Bróna Haughey (Sinn Féin)	Keith Ratcliffe (TUV)	Gordon Kennedy (UUP)	Gareth Wilson (DUP)	Paul Berry (Independent)/ (DUP)	5 seats 2014–present
2019	Bróna Haughey (Sinn Féin)	Jim Speers (UUP)	Gordon Kennedy (UUP)	Gareth Wilson (DUP)	Paul Berry (Independent)/ (DUP)	5 seats 2014–present
2014	Sharon Haughey (SDLP)	Jim Speers (UUP)	Gordon Kennedy (UUP)	Gareth Wilson (DUP)	Paul Berry (Independent)/ (DUP)	5 seats 2014–present
2011	Sharon Haughey (SDLP)	Robert Turner (UUP)	Gordon Kennedy (UUP)	Gareth Wilson (DUP)	Paul Berry (Independent)/ (DUP)	Terry McWilliams (DUP)
2005	Sharon Haughey (SDLP)	Robert Turner (UUP)	Eric Speers (UUP)	Gareth Wilson (DUP)	Paul Berry (Independent)/ (DUP)	Margaret Black (DUP)
2001	Thomas Canavan (SDLP)	Robert Turner (UUP)	Eric Speers (UUP)	James Clayton (UUP)	Paul Berry (Independent)/ (DUP)	Margaret Black (DUP)
1997	Thomas Canavan (SDLP)	Robert Turner (UUP)	Eric Speers (UUP)	James Clayton (UUP)	Sharon McClelland (UUP)	Margaret Black (DUP)
1993	Thomas Canavan (SDLP)	Robert Turner (UUP)	Eric Speers (UUP)	James Clayton (UUP)	Robert McWilliams (UUP)	Margaret Black (DUP)
1989	Thomas Canavan (SDLP)	Robert Turner (UUP)	Eric Speers (UUP)	James Clayton (UUP)	Thomas Johnston (UUP)	Thomas Black (DUP)
1985	Seamus Mallon (SDLP)	Robert Turner (UUP)	Eric Speers (UUP)	James Clayton (UUP)	Thomas Johnston (UUP)	Thomas Black (DUP)

== 2023 Election ==
2019: 2 x UUP, 1 x DUP, 1 x Sinn Féin, 1 x Independent

2023: 1 x DUP, 1 x Sinn Féin, 1 x TUV, 1 x UUP, 1 x Independent

2019–2023 Change: TUV gain from UUP

Cusher - 5 seats
Party	Candidate	FPv%	Count			
Party	Candidate	FPv%	1	2	3	4
Sinn Féin	Bróna Haughey*	17.73%	2,177			
Independent	Paul Berry*	16.77%	2,059			
TUV	Keith Ratcliffe	16.59%	2,037	2,037.28	2,072.28	
DUP	Gareth Wilson* †	15.57%	1,912	1,912.07	1,941.07	1,963.49
UUP	Gordon Kennedy*	8.95%	1,099	1,099.84	1,432.91	1,832.93
DUP	Philip Weir	11.24%	1,380	1,380.14	1,402.14	1,432.61
SDLP	Emma Jayne McKernan	4.71%	578	685.03	688.03	
Alliance	Mark Skillen	4.84%	594	605.34	620.34	
UUP	Ewan McNeill	3.60%	442	442.07		
Electorate: 19,358 Valid: 12,278 (63.43%) Spoilt: 92 Quota: 2,047 Turnout: 12,370 (63.90%)

== 2019 Election ==
2014: 2 x UUP, 1 x DUP, 1 x SDLP, 1 x Independent

2019: 2 x UUP, 1 x DUP, 1 x Sinn Féin, 1 x Independent

2014-2019 Change: Sinn Féin gain from SDLP

Cusher - 5 seats
Party	Candidate	FPv%	Count						
Party	Candidate	FPv%	1	2	3	4	5	6	7
DUP	Gareth Wilson*	19.62%	2,248						
Independent	Paul Berry*	17.54%	2,009						
Sinn Féin	Bróna Haughey	13.26%	1,519	1,519.15	1,552.3	2,094.3			
UUP	Jim Speers*	14.25%	1,633	1,697.05	1,827.3	1,931.3			
UUP	Gordon Kennedy*	10.73%	1,229	1,254.95	1,393.5	1,465.5	1,520.5	1,567.6	1,585.96
DUP	Quincey Dougan	10.60%	1,215	1,445.1	1,514.95	1,527.4	1,538.4	1,581.4	1,584.12
SDLP	Seamus Livingstone	7.86%	901	902.45	1,106.05				
Alliance	Gareth Hay	4.03%	462	463.05					
Independent	Paul Bowbanks	2.10%	241	253.15					
Electorate: 18,496 Valid: 11,457 (61.94%) Spoilt: 112 Quota: 1,910 Turnout: 11,569 (62.55%)

== 2014 Election ==
2011: 2 x UUP, 2 x DUP, 1 x SDLP, 1 x Independent

2014: 2 x UUP, 1 x DUP, 1 x SDLP, 1 x Independent

2011-2014 Change: DUP loss due to the reduction of one seat

Cusher - 5 seats
Party	Candidate	FPv%	Count			
Party	Candidate	FPv%	1	2	3	4
UUP	Jim Speers*	21.17%	2,221			
Independent	Paul Berry*	18.36%	1,927			
UUP	Gordon Kennedy*	17.27%	1,812			
SDLP	Sharon Haughey*	11.44%	1,200	1,229.52	1,235.52	1,949.52
DUP	Gareth Wilson*	12.25%	1,285	1,547.8	1,631.6	1,632.6
DUP	Tim McClelland	9.77%	1,025	1,195.88	1,273.18	1,281.18
Sinn Féin	Mary Doyle*	9.75%	1,023	1,023.48	1,024.48	
Electorate: 17,523 Valid: 10,493 (59.88%) Spoilt: 122 Quota: 1,749 Turnout: 10,615 (60.58%)

== 2011 Election ==
2005: 3 x DUP, 2 x UUP, 1 x SDLP

2011: 2 x UUP, 2 x DUP, 1 x SDLP, 1 x Independent

2005-2011 Change: Independent gain from DUP

Cusher - 6 seats
Party	Candidate	FPv%	Count					
Party	Candidate	FPv%	1	2	3	4	5	6
UUP	Gordon Kennedy	23.05%	1,785					
Independent	Paul Berry*	14.67%	1,136					
UUP	Robert Turner*	12.19%	944	1,138.61				
SDLP	Sharon Haughey*	10.63%	823	834.7	835.3	842.69	1,271.69	
DUP	Terry McWilliams	10.37%	803	903.62	906.44	1,038.61	1,040	1,052
DUP	Gareth Wilson*	7.68%	595	625.03	627.97	986.33	988.33	992.33
UUP	John Moore	7.31%	566	847.97	867.89	903.64	903.64	925.64
Sinn Féin	Liam Lappin	7.63%	591	591.39	591.39	591.39		
DUP	Philip Murdock	6.47%	501	550.53	552.33			
Electorate: 12,337 Valid: 7,744 (62.77%) Spoilt: 146 Quota: 1,107 Turnout: 7,890 (63.95%)

== 2005 Election ==
2001: 3 x UUP, 2 x DUP, 1 x SDLP

2005: 3 x DUP, 2 x UUP, 1 x SDLP

2001-2005 Change: DUP gain from UUP

Cusher - 6 seats
Party	Candidate	FPv%	Count					
Party	Candidate	FPv%	1	2	3	4	5	6
DUP	Paul Berry*	40.48%	3,263					
UUP	Eric Speers*	16.08%	1,296					
DUP	Margaret Black*	3.09%	249	1,591.25				
SDLP	Sharon Haughey	9.85%	794	801.8	802.85	853.5	855.7	1,300.7
DUP	Gareth Wilson	4.12%	332	749.95	1,060.96	1,131.39	1,138.87	1,138.87
UUP	Robert Turner*	11.14%	898	829.3	867.1	953.32	1,045.17	1,048.17
UUP	James Clayton*	5.58%	450	570.25	625.27	764.32	801.17	807.03
Sinn Féin	Siobhán Vallely	8.13%	655	655	655.21	660.86	660.97	
Independent	Paul Bowbanks	4.02%	324	393.55	408.88			
Electorate: 11,376 Valid: 8,061 (70.86%) Spoilt: 125 Quota: 1,152 Turnout: 8,186 (71.96%)

== 2001 Election ==
1997: 4 x UUP, 1 x DUP, 1 x SDLP

2001: 3 x UUP, 2 x DUP, 1 x SDLP

1997-2001 Change: DUP gain from UUP

Cusher - 6 seats
Party	Candidate	FPv%	Count						
Party	Candidate	FPv%	1	2	3	4	5	6	7
DUP	Paul Berry	41.33%	3,549						
DUP	Margaret Black*	2.15%	185	1,579.58					
UUP	Eric Speers*	14.00%	1,202	1,399.34					
SDLP	Thomas Canavan*	11.66%	1,001	1,003.64	1,006.02	1,039.68	1,040.3	1,048.96	1,493.96
UUP	Robert Turner*	8.44%	725	797.6	811.2	856.5	918.5	1,163.93	1,168.59
UUP	James Clayton*	7.91%	679	837.4	884.83	939.77	973.25	1,146.23	1,148.23
DUP	Mervyn Spratt	1.20%	103	479.86	746.08	768.21	807.89	850.07	850.07
Sinn Féin	Noel Sheridan*	6.88%	591	591.66	592	594	594	594.17	
UUP	Sharon McClelland*	4.27%	367	429.7	441.94	480.11	514.21		
Independent	Derrick Mathews	2.17%	186	212.4	218.52				
Electorate: 11,175 Valid: 8,588 (76.85%) Spoilt: 140 Quota: 1,227 Turnout: 8,728 (78.10%)

== 1997 Election ==
1993: 4 x UUP, 1 x DUP, 1 x SDLP

1997: 4 x UUP, 1 x DUP, 1 x SDLP

1993-1997 Change: No change

Cusher - 6 seats
Party	Candidate	FPv%	Count		
Party	Candidate	FPv%	1	2	3
UUP	Eric Speers*	25.94%	1,915		
DUP	Margaret Black*	21.36%	1,577		
SDLP	Thomas Canavan*	14.32%	1,057		
UUP	Robert Turner*	11.81%	872	1,266.2	
UUP	Sharon McClelland	10.97%	810	1,129.05	
UUP	James Clayton*	10.80%	797	929.3	1,438.9
Sinn Féin	Thomas Carroll	4.80%	355	355.45	357.05
Electorate: 10,774 Valid: 7,383 (68.53%) Spoilt: 84 Quota: 1,055 Turnout: 7,467 (69.31%)

== 1993 Election ==
1989: 4 x UUP, 1 x SDLP, 1 x DUP

1993: 4 x UUP, 1 x SDLP, 1 x DUP

1989-1993 Change: No change

Cusher - 6 seats
Party	Candidate	FPv%	Count		
Party	Candidate	FPv%	1	2	3
UUP	Robert McWilliams	22.94%	1,685		
UUP	Eric Speers*	21.40%	1,572		
SDLP	Thomas Canavan*	15.85%	1,164		
DUP	Margaret Black*	14.30%	1,050		
UUP	Robert Turner*	12.62%	927	1,370.2	
UUP	James Clayton*	9.49%	697	879.4	1,393.03
Sinn Féin	Margaret McNally	3.40%	250	250.4	253.13
Electorate: 10,288 Valid: 7,345 (71.39%) Spoilt: 127 Quota: 1,050 Turnout: 7,472 (72.63%)

== 1989 Election ==
1985: 4 x UUP, 1 x SDLP, 1 x DUP

1989: 4 x UUP, 1 x SDLP, 1 x DUP

1985-1989 Change: No change

Cusher - 6 seats
Party	Candidate	FPv%	Count		
Party	Candidate	FPv%	1	2	3
UUP	Eric Speers*	20.38%	1,561		
DUP	Thomas Black*	18.85%	1,444		
UUP	Thomas Johnston*	17.15%	1,314		
SDLP	Thomas Canavan	15.07%	1,154		
UUP	Robert Turner*	12.22%	936	1,239.49	
UUP	James Clayton*	10.73%	822	974.52	1,314.72
Sinn Féin	Margaret McNally	4.30%	329	329	329.56
Independent	Eugene Turley	1.31%	100	109.61	113.81
Electorate: 9,988 Valid: 7,660 (76.69%) Spoilt: 151 Quota: 1,095 Turnout: 7,811 (78.20%)

== 1985 Election ==
1985: 4 x UUP, 1 x SDLP, 1 x DUP

Cusher - 6 seats
Party	Candidate	FPv%	Count		
Party	Candidate	FPv%	1	2	3
UUP	Eric Speers	17.92%	1,267		
SDLP	Seamus Mallon*	17.82%	1,260		
UUP	Thomas Johnston	16.25%	1,149		
DUP	Thomas Black*	14.27%	1,009		
UUP	Robert Turner*	12.74%	901	1,042.4	
UUP	James Clayton	13.28%	939	993.4	1,059.4
DUP	Mervyn Spratt	7.72%	546	570	615
Electorate: 9,467 Valid: 7,071 (74.69%) Spoilt: 63 Quota: 1,011 Turnout: 7,134 (75.36%)
