= 1997 Armagh City and District Council election =

Local govt election in Northern Ireland

| ← 1993 | 21 May 1997 | 2001 → |

All 22 seats to Armagh City and District Council 12 seats needed for a majority
| | First party | Second party | Third party |
|---|---|---|---|
| Party | UUP | SDLP | Sinn Féin |
| Seats won | 10 | 7 | 3 |
| Seat change | Steady | ▼2 | ▲2 |
| | Fourth party |
| Party | DUP |
| Seats won | 2 |
| Seat change | Steady |
- Results by district electoral area, shaded by First Preference Votes.

Elections to Armagh City and District Council were held on 21 May 1997 on the same day as the other Northern Irish local government elections. The election used four district electoral areas to elect a total of 22 councillors.

== Election results ==
Armagh City and District Council Election Result 1997
| Party | Seats | Gains | Losses | Net gain/loss | Seats % | Votes % | Votes | +/− |
|---|---|---|---|---|---|---|---|---|
| UUP | 10 | 0 | 0 | Steady | 45.5 | 42.0 | 11,002 | ▼2.5 |
| SDLP | 7 | 0 | 2 | ▼2 | 31.8 | 30.8 | 8,055 | ▼4.8 |
| Sinn Féin | 3 | 2 | 0 | ▲2 | 13.6 | 14.6 | 3,826 | ▲6.2 |
| DUP | 2 | 0 | 0 | Steady | 9.1 | 11.9 | 3,117 | ▲0.4 |
| Alliance | 0 | 0 | 0 | Steady | 0.0 | 0.7 | 167 | ▲0.7 |

Note: "Votes" are the first preference votes.

== Districts summary ==
Results of the Armagh City and District Council election, 1997 by district
| Ward | % | Cllrs | % | Cllrs | % | Cllrs | % | Cllrs | % | Cllrs | Total Cllrs |
| Ward | UUP | | SDLP | | Sinn Féin | | DUP | | Others | | Total Cllrs |
|---|---|---|---|---|---|---|---|---|---|---|---|
| Armagh City | 25.3 | 2 | 38.1 | 2 | 25.9 | 2 | 8.1 | 0 | 2.6 | 0 | 6 |
| Crossmore | 30.8 | 1 | 49.4 | 3 | 19.8 | 0 | 0.0 | 0 | 0.0 | 0 | 5 |
| Cusher | 59.5 | 4 | 14.3 | 1 | 4.8 | 0 | 21.4 | 1 | 0.0 | 0 | 6 |
| The Orchard | 49.7 | 3 | 24.5 | 1 | 9.4 | 0 | 16.4 | 1 | 0.0 | 0 | 5 |
| Total | 42.0 | 10 | 30.8 | 7 | 14.6 | 3 | 11.9 | 2 | 0.7 | 0 | 22 |

== District results ==
=== Armagh City ===
1993: 3 x SDLP, 2 x UUP, 1 x Sinn Féin
1997: 2 x SDLP, 2 x UUP, 2 x Sinn Féin
1993-1997 Change: Sinn Féin gain from SDLP

Armagh City - 6 seats
| Party | Candidate | FPv% | Count | | | | |
| Party | Candidate | FPv% | 1 | 2 | 3 | 4 | 5 |
|---|---|---|---|---|---|---|---|
| SDLP | Pat Brannigan* | 19.23% | 1,251 | | | | |
| SDLP | Anna Brolly* | 8.41% | 547 | 792.7 | 938.32 | | |
| UUP | Sylvia McRoberts* | 13.81% | 898 | 900.34 | 949.34 | | |
| UUP | Gordon Frazer* | 11.52% | 749 | 750.04 | 774.04 | 1,279.04 | |
| Sinn Féin | Noel Sheridan* | 12.99% | 845 | 851.5 | 858.8 | 858.8 | 859.8 |
| Sinn Féin | Seán McGirr | 12.93% | 841 | 847.24 | 857.02 | 858.02 | 858.02 |
| SDLP | Michael Carson | 8.16% | 531 | 572.08 | 639.98 | 642.98 | 699.98 |
| DUP | Noel Donnelly | 8.13% | 529 | 529.52 | 532.52 | | |
| Alliance | Ryan Williams | 2.57% | 167 | 171.68 | | | |
| SDLP | Ann McKenna | 2.24% | 146 | 157.44 | | | |
Electorate: 10,035 Valid: 6,504 (64.81%) Spoilt: 129 Quota: 930 Turnout: 6,633 (66.10%)

=== Crossmore ===
1993: 4 x SDLP, 1 x UUP
1997: 3 x SDLP, 1 x UUP, 1 x Sinn Féin
1993-1997 Change: Sinn Féin gain from SDLP

Crossmore - 5 seats
| Party | Candidate | FPv% | Count | | | | |
| Party | Candidate | FPv% | 1 | 2 | 3 | 4 | 5 |
|---|---|---|---|---|---|---|---|
| Sinn Féin | Brian Cunningham | 19.78% | 1,207 | | | | |
| UUP | Evelyn Corry | 18.60% | 1,135 | | | | |
| SDLP | Thomas Kavanagh* | 18.14% | 1,107 | | | | |
| SDLP | James McGleenan* | 8.75% | 534 | 608.36 | 608.66 | 654.66 | 1,070.66 |
| SDLP | James McKernan* | 14.13% | 862 | 902.48 | 903.58 | 908.78 | 1,029.36 |
| UUP | William Hamilton | 12.24% | 747 | 748.98 | 859.18 | 859.42 | 863.06 |
| SDLP | James Lennon* | 8.34% | 509 | 577.64 | 577.84 | 610.64 | |
Electorate: 8,121 Valid: 6,101 (75.13%) Spoilt: 93 Quota: 1,017 Turnout: 6,194 (76.27%)

=== Cusher ===
1993: 4 x UUP, 1 x DUP, 1 x SDLP
1997: 4 x UUP, 1 x DUP, 1 x SDLP
1993-1997 Change: No change

Cusher - 6 seats
| Party | Candidate | FPv% | Count | | |
| Party | Candidate | FPv% | 1 | 2 | 3 |
|---|---|---|---|---|---|
| UUP | Eric Speers* | 25.94% | 1,915 | | |
| DUP | Margaret Black* | 21.36% | 1,577 | | |
| SDLP | Thomas Canavan* | 14.32% | 1,057 | | |
| UUP | Robert Turner* | 11.81% | 872 | 1,266.2 | |
| UUP | Sharon McClelland | 10.97% | 810 | 1,129.05 | |
| UUP | James Clayton* | 10.80% | 797 | 929.3 | 1,438.9 |
| Sinn Féin | Thomas Carroll | 4.80% | 355 | 355.45 | 357.05 |
Electorate: 10,774 Valid: 7,383 (68.53%) Spoilt: 84 Quota: 1,055 Turnout: 7,467 (69.31%)

=== The Orchard ===
1993: 3 x UUP, 1 x DUP, 1 x SDLP
1997: 3 x UUP, 1 x DUP, 1 x SDLP
1993-1997 Change: No change

The Orchard - 5 seats
| Party | Candidate | FPv% | Count | | | |
| Party | Candidate | FPv% | 1 | 2 | 3 | 4 |
|---|---|---|---|---|---|---|
| UUP | Jim Speers* | 26.38% | 1,630 | | | |
| DUP | Brian Hutchinson* | 16.36% | 1,011 | 1,119.78 | | |
| UUP | Charles Rollston* | 13.53% | 836 | 1,061.33 | | |
| UUP | Olive Whitten* | 9.92% | 613 | 873.85 | 960.3 | |
| SDLP | John Campbell | 14.27% | 882 | 883.11 | 883.46 | 1,205.46 |
| SDLP | Eamon McNeill | 10.18% | 629 | 631.22 | 632.62 | 717.62 |
| Sinn Féin | Elizabeth Gartland | 9.35% | 578 | 578 | 578 | |
Electorate: 8,976 Valid: 6,179 (68.84%) Spoilt: 80 Quota: 1,030 Turnout: 6,259 (69.73%)
