= 2001 Armagh City and District Council election =

Local govt election in Northern Ireland

← 1997	7 June 2001	2005 →

All 22 seats to Armagh City and District Council 12 seats needed for a majority
	First party	Second party	Third party
Party	UUP	SDLP	Sinn Féin
Seats won	7	6	5
Seat change	▼3	▼1	▲2
	Fourth party
Party	DUP
Seats won	4
Seat change	▲2
- Party with the most votes by district.

Elections to Armagh City and District Council were held on 7 June 2001 on the same day as the other Northern Irish local government elections. The election used four district electoral areas to elect a total of 22 councillors.

== Election results ==
Armagh City and District Council Election Result 2001
Party	Seats	Gains	Losses	Net gain/loss	Seats %	Votes %	Votes	+/−
UUP	7	0	3	▼3	31.8	25.9	7,757	▼16.1
SDLP	6	0	1	▼1	27.3	24.4	7,310	▼6.4
Sinn Féin	5	2	0	▲2	22.7	20.6	6,177	▲6.0
DUP	4	2	0	▲2	18.2	25.6	7,677	▲13.7
Independent	0	0	0	0	0.0	2.8	832	▲2.8
NI Women's Coalition	0	0	0	0	0.0	0.7	209	New

Note: "Votes" are the first preference votes.

== Districts summary ==
Results of the Armagh City and District Council election, 2001 by district
Ward	%	Cllrs	%	Cllrs	%	Cllrs	%	Cllrs	%	Cllrs	Total Cllrs
Ward	UUP		SDLP		Sinn Féin		DUP		Others		Total Cllrs
Armagh City	18.8	1	29.1	2	29.1	2	11.6	1	11.4	0	6
Crossmore	13.7	1	39.9	2	32.6	0	13.8	0	0.0	0	5
Cusher	34.5	3	11.7	1	6.9	0	44.7	2	2.2	0	6
The Orchard	34.3	2	20.2	1	17.0	1	28.5	1	0.0	0	5
Total	25.9	7	24.4	6	20.6	5	25.6	4	3.5	0	22

== District results ==
=== Armagh City ===
1997: 2 x SDLP, 2 x Sinn Féin, 2 x UUP
2001: 2 x SDLP, 2 x Sinn Féin, 1 x UUP, 1 x DUP
1997-2001 Change: DUP gain from UUP

Armagh City - 6 seats
Party	Candidate	FPv%	Count									
Party	Candidate	FPv%	1	2	3	4	5	6	7	8	9	10
Sinn Féin	Patrick McNamee	16.95%	1,261									
Sinn Féin	Cathy Rafferty	12.11%	901	1,059.24	1,078.24							
SDLP	Pat Brannigan*	13.62%	1,013	1,018.6	1,043.76	1,142.76						
UUP	Sylvia McRoberts*	11.67%	868	868.48	883.12	890.12	891.84	891.84	1,333.84			
DUP	Freda Donnelly	11.58%	861	861	867	868	868	868	943	1,159.48		
SDLP	Anna Brolly*	4.97%	370	373.2	395.36	503.12	553.86	559.86	562.86	588.28	644.04	1,030.66
Independent	John Nixon	8.69%	646	663.12	708.6	741.4	745.7	749.7	753.7	763.54	779.94	902.92
SDLP	Michael Carson	6.13%	456	461.76	482.24	574.52	596.88	600.88	601.88	619.92	639.6	
UUP	Gordon Frazer*	7.10%	528	528	546	547	547	547				
SDLP	Mealla Bratton	4.37%	325	329.8	353.96							
NI Women's Coalition	Margaret Connolly	2.81%	209	211.56								
Electorate: 10,014 Valid: 7,438 (74.28%) Spoilt: 170 Quota: 1,063 Turnout: 7,608 (75.97%)

=== Crossmore ===
1997: 3 x SDLP, 1 x Sinn Féin, 1 x UUP
2001: 2 x SDLP, 2 x Sinn Féin, 1 x DUP
1997-2001 Change: Sinn Féin gain from SDLP

Crossmore - 5 seats
Party	Candidate	FPv%	Count						
Party	Candidate	FPv%	1	2	3	4	5	6	7
Sinn Féin	Brian Cunningham*	19.77%	1,336						
SDLP	Thomas Kavanagh*	14.63%	989	1,032.84	1,366.84				
SDLP	James McKernan*	10.40%	703	704.92	751.88	862.64	1,366.64		
Sinn Féin	Pat O'Rawe	12.83%	867	1,010.36	1,030.8	1,045.62	1,114.78	1,212.78	
UUP	Evelyn Corry*	13.72%	927	927.32	927.32	927.32	934	950	974
DUP	Noel Berry	13.76%	930	930.16	930.16	930.16	933.16	933.16	935.16
SDLP	James Lennon	8.20%	554	558.8	609.68	722			
SDLP	Joe McGleenan	6.69%	452	464.32					
Electorate: 8,488 Valid: 6,758 (79.61%) Spoilt: 125 Quota: 1,127 Turnout: 6,883 (81.09%)

=== Cusher ===
1997: 4 x UUP, 1 x DUP, 1 x SDLP
2001: 3 x UUP, 2 x DUP, 1 x SDLP
1997-2001 Change: DUP gain from UUP

Cusher - 6 seats
Party	Candidate	FPv%	Count						
Party	Candidate	FPv%	1	2	3	4	5	6	7
DUP	Paul Berry	41.33%	3,549						
DUP	Margaret Black*	2.15%	185	1,579.58					
UUP	Eric Speers*	14.00%	1,202	1,399.34					
SDLP	Thomas Canavan*	11.66%	1,001	1,003.64	1,006.02	1,039.68	1,040.3	1,048.96	1,493.96
UUP	Robert Turner*	8.44%	725	797.6	811.2	856.5	918.5	1,163.93	1,168.59
UUP	James Clayton*	7.91%	679	837.4	884.83	939.77	973.25	1,146.23	1,148.23
DUP	Mervyn Spratt	1.20%	103	479.86	746.08	768.21	807.89	850.07	850.07
Sinn Féin	Noel Sheridan*	6.88%	591	591.66	592	594	594	594.17	
UUP	Sharon McClelland*	4.27%	367	429.7	441.94	480.11	514.21		
Independent	Derrick Mathews	2.17%	186	212.4	218.52				
Electorate: 11,175 Valid: 8,588 (76.85%) Spoilt: 140 Quota: 1,227 Turnout: 8,728 (78.10%)

=== The Orchard ===
1997: 3 x UUP, 1 x DUP, 1 x SDLP
2001: 2 x UUP, 1 x DUP, 1 x Sinn Féin, 1 x SDLP
1997-2001 Change: Sinn Féin gain from UUP

The Orchard - 5 seats
Party	Candidate	FPv%	Count				
Party	Candidate	FPv%	1	2	3	4	5
DUP	Brian Hutchinson*	18.99%	1,363				
UUP	Jim Speers*	18.45%	1,324				
Sinn Féin	Paul Corrigan	17.01%	1,221				
SDLP	John Campbell*	11.09%	796	796.48	797.48	798.08	1,407.08
UUP	Charles Rollston*	8.99%	645	653.88	1,056.16	1,164.66	1,174.28
DUP	William Irwin	9.56%	686	831.92	898.12	914.42	919.52
SDLP	Eamon McNeill	9.07%	651	651.24	656.24	657.14	
UUP	Olive Whitten*	6.85%	492	497.16			
Electorate: 9,234 Valid: 7,178 (77.73%) Spoilt: 117 Quota: 1,197 Turnout: 7,295 (79.00%)
