= 1989 Armagh District Council election =

Local govt election in Northern Ireland

← 1985	17 May 1989	1993 →

All 22 seats to Armagh District Council 12 seats needed for a majority
	First party	Second party	Third party
Party	UUP	SDLP	DUP
Seats won	11	8	2
Seat change	0	▲1	▼1
	Fourth party
Party	Sinn Féin
Seats won	1
Seat change	0

Elections to Armagh District Council were held on 17 May 1989 on the same day as the other Northern Irish local government elections. The election used four district electoral areas to elect a total of 22 councillors.

== Election results ==
Armagh District Council Election Result 1989
Party	Seats	Gains	Losses	Net gain/loss	Seats %	Votes %	Votes	+/−
UUP	11	0	0	0	50.0	46.6	11,631	▲2.8
SDLP	8	1	0	▲1	36.4	31.7	7,931	▲1.6
DUP	2	0	1	▼1	9.1	12.2	3,054	▼4.8
Sinn Féin	1	0	0	0	4.5	8.2	2,050	▲1.8
Workers' Party	0	0	0	0	0.0	0.9	232	▲0.9
Independent	0	0	0	0	0.0	0.4	100	▲0.4

Note: "Votes" are the first preference votes.

== Districts summary ==
Results of the Armagh District Council election, 1989 by district
Ward	%	Cllrs	%	Cllrs	%	Cllrs	%	Cllrs	%	Cllrs	Total Cllrs
Ward	UUP		SDLP		DUP		Sinn Féin		Others		Total Cllrs
Armagh City	29.6	2	43.0	3	10.4	0	13.3	1	3.7	0	6
Crossmore	36.7	2	54.3	3	0.0	0	9.1	0	0.0	0	5
Cusher	60.5	4	15.1	1	18.9	1	4.3	0	1.2	0	6
The Orchard	55.6	3	20.9	1	16.5	1	7.0	0	0.0	0	5
Total	46.6	11	31.7	8	12.2	2	8.2	1	1.3	0	22

== District results ==
=== Armagh City ===
1985: 2 x SDLP, 2 x UUP, 1 x Sinn Féin, 1 x DUP
1989: 3 x SDLP, 2 x UUP, 1 x Sinn Féin
1985-1989 Change: SDLP gain from DUP

Armagh City - 6 seats
Party	Candidate	FPv%	Count					
Party	Candidate	FPv%	1	2	3	4	5	6
SDLP	John Agnew*	16.07%	1,019					
UUP	George Macartney*	15.44%	979					
UUP	John Doogan*	14.16%	898					
SDLP	Pat Brannigan*	14.08%	893	967.69				
SDLP	Anna Brolly	12.87%	816	841.19	841.26	897.96	996.96	
Sinn Féin	Seamus Hart	8.51%	540	544.18	544.18	545.08	576.81	881.64
DUP	Harold Carson	10.41%	660	660.33	666.56	666.56	672.93	673.93
Sinn Féin	Stephen Fields	4.81%	305	307.09	307.09	307.54	325.76	
Workers' Party	Patrick McCusker	3.66%	232	235.74	236.65	237.91		
Electorate: 9,628 Valid: 6,342 (65.87%) Spoilt: 202 Quota: 907 Turnout: 6,544 (67.97%)

=== Crossmore ===
1985: 3 x SDLP, 2 x UUP
1989: 3 x SDLP, 2 x UUP
1985-1989 Change: No change

Crossmore - 5 seats
Party	Candidate	FPv%	Count		
Party	Candidate	FPv%	1	2	3
UUP	Jim Nicholson*	28.29%	1,484		
SDLP	Thomas Kavanagh	22.15%	1,162		
SDLP	James McKernan*	19.85%	1,041		
UUP	Thomas Shilliday*	8.39%	440	1,036.96	
SDLP	Charles Mallon*	12.26%	643	643.82	897.57
Sinn Féin	Thomas Carroll	9.06%	475	475	499.25
Electorate: 7,295 Valid: 5,245 (71.90%) Spoilt: 158 Quota: 875 Turnout: 5,403 (74.06%)

=== Cusher ===
1985: 4 x UUP, 1 x SDLP, 1 x DUP
1989: 4 x UUP, 1 x SDLP, 1 x DUP
1985-1989 Change: No change

Cusher - 6 seats
Party	Candidate	FPv%	Count		
Party	Candidate	FPv%	1	2	3
UUP	Eric Speers*	20.38%	1,561		
DUP	Thomas Black*	18.85%	1,444		
UUP	Thomas Johnston*	17.15%	1,314		
SDLP	Thomas Canavan	15.07%	1,154		
UUP	Robert Turner*	12.22%	936	1,239.49	
UUP	James Clayton*	10.73%	822	974.52	1,314.72
Sinn Féin	Margaret McNally	4.30%	329	329	329.56
Independent	Eugene Turley	1.31%	100	109.61	113.81
Electorate: 9,988 Valid: 7,660 (76.69%) Spoilt: 151 Quota: 1,095 Turnout: 7,811 (78.20%)

=== The Orchard ===
1985: 3 x UUP, 1 x SDLP, 1 x DUP
1989: 3 x UUP, 1 x SDLP, 1 x DUP
1985-1989 Change: No change

The Orchard - 5 seats
Party	Candidate	FPv%	Count			
Party	Candidate	FPv%	1	2	3	4
UUP	Jim Speers*	28.95%	1,665			
SDLP	John Kernan	20.92%	1,203			
UUP	Samuel Foster*	14.87%	855	1,179.24		
DUP	Douglas Hutchinson*	16.52%	950	1,081.88		
UUP	Olive Whitten	11.77%	677	910.52	928	1,147.9
Sinn Féin	Brendan Casey	6.97%	401	401	625.02	625.02
Electorate: 8,056 Valid: 5,751 (71.39%) Spoilt: 111 Quota: 959 Turnout: 5,862 (72.77%)
