= 1993 Armagh District Council election =

Local govt election in Northern Ireland

← 1989	19 May 1993	1997 →

All 22 seats to Armagh District Council 12 seats needed for a majority
	First party	Second party	Third party
Party	UUP	SDLP	DUP
Seats won	10	9	2
Seat change	▼1	▲1	Steady
	Fourth party
Party	Sinn Féin
Seats won	1
Seat change	Steady
- Party with the most votes by district.

Elections to Armagh District Council were held on 19 May 1993 on the same day as the other Northern Irish local government elections. The election used four district electoral areas to elect a total of 22 councillors.

== Election results ==
Armagh District Council Election Result 1993
Party	Seats	Gains	Losses	Net gain/loss	Seats %	Votes %	Votes	+/−
UUP	10	0	1	▼1	45.5	44.5	11,309	▼2.1
SDLP	9	1	0	▲1	40.9	35.6	9,052	▲3.9
DUP	2	0	0	Steady	9.1	11.5	2,914	▼0.7
Sinn Féin	1	0	0	Steady	4.5	8.4	2,121	▲0.2

Note: "Votes" are the first preference votes.

== Districts summary ==
Results of the Armagh District Council election, 1993 by district
Ward	%	Cllrs	%	Cllrs	%	Cllrs	%	Cllrs	%	Cllrs	Total Cllrs
Ward	UUP		SDLP		DUP		Sinn Féin		Others		Total Cllrs
Armagh City	26.5	2	46.7	3	11.2	0	15.6	1	0.0	0	6
Crossmore	31.0	1	59.7	4	0.0	0	9.3	0	0.0	0	5
Cusher	66.5	4	15.8	1	14.3	1	3.4	0	0.0	0	6
The Orchard	49.9	3	24.1	1	20.1	1	5.9	0	0.0	0	5
Total	44.5	10	35.6	9	11.5	2	8.4	1	0.0	0	22

== District results ==
=== Armagh City ===
1989: 3 x SDLP, 2 x UUP, 1 x Sinn Féin
1993: 3 x SDLP, 2 x UUP, 1 x Sinn Féin
1989-1993 Change: No change

Armagh City - 6 seats
Party	Candidate	FPv%	Count				
Party	Candidate	FPv%	1	2	3	4	5
SDLP	John Agnew*	18.75%	1,156				
SDLP	Pat Brannigan*	16.42%	1,012				
UUP	Gordon Frazer	16.09%	992				
Sinn Féin	Noel Sheridan	15.59%	961				
SDLP	Anna Brolly*	11.52%	710	981.18			
UUP	Sylvia McRoberts	10.45%	644	645.82	758.46	839.31	860.89
DUP	Harold Carson	11.19%	690	691.82	709.42	735.6	743.92
Electorate: 9,590 Valid: 6,165 (64.29%) Spoilt: 182 Quota: 881 Turnout: 6,347 (66.18%)

=== Crossmore ===
1989: 3 x SDLP, 2 x UUP
1993: 4 x SDLP, 1 x UUP
1989-1993 Change: SDLP gain from UUP

Crossmore - 5 seats
Party	Candidate	FPv%	Count		
Party	Candidate	FPv%	1	2	3
SDLP	Thomas Kavanagh*	22.87%	1,379		
SDLP	James McKernan*	17.05%	1,028		
UUP	Jim Nicholson*	16.75%	1,010		
SDLP	James Lennon	10.93%	659	800.68	954.72
SDLP	James McGleenan	8.86%	534	717.68	919.92
UUP	William Hamilton	14.23%	858	859.12	869.52
Sinn Féin	Brian Cunningham	9.32%	562	597.56	
Electorate: 7,741 Valid: 6,030 (77.90%) Spoilt: 126 Quota: 1,006 Turnout: 6,156 (79.52%)

=== Cusher ===
1989: 4 x UUP, 1 x SDLP, 1 x DUP
1993: 4 x UUP, 1 x SDLP, 1 x DUP
1989-1993 Change: No change

Cusher - 6 seats
Party	Candidate	FPv%	Count		
Party	Candidate	FPv%	1	2	3
UUP	Robert McWilliams	22.94%	1,685		
UUP	Eric Speers*	21.40%	1,572		
SDLP	Thomas Canavan*	15.85%	1,164		
DUP	Margaret Black*	14.30%	1,050		
UUP	Robert Turner*	12.62%	927	1,370.2	
UUP	James Clayton*	9.49%	697	879.4	1,393.03
Sinn Féin	Margaret McNally	3.40%	250	250.4	253.13
Electorate: 10,288 Valid: 7,345 (71.39%) Spoilt: 127 Quota: 1,050 Turnout: 7,472 (72.63%)

=== The Orchard ===
1989: 3 x UUP, 1 x SDLP, 1 x DUP
1993: 3 x UUP, 1 x SDLP, 1 x DUP
1989-1993 Change: No change

The Orchard - 5 seats
Party	Candidate	FPv%	Count		
Party	Candidate	FPv%	1	2	3
UUP	Jim Speers*	27.66%	1,620		
SDLP	John Kernan*	24.08%	1,410		
DUP	Brian Hutchinson	20.05%	1,174		
UUP	Charles Rollston	12.79%	749	991	
UUP	Olive Whitten*	9.48%	555	940.2	985.95
Sinn Féin	Brendan Casey	5.94%	348	348.8	733.55
Electorate: 8,581 Valid: 5,856 (68.24%) Spoilt: 93 Quota: 977 Turnout: 5,949 (69.33%)
