= Armagh (District Electoral Area) =

District electoral area in Northern Ireland

- Armagh City, Banbridge and Craigavon Borough Council DEA constituency

Current constituency
- Created: 1985
- Seats: 6 (1985-)
- Councillors: Scott Armstrong (DUP); Fergal Donnelly (SF); Sarah Duffy (SF); Ashley Mallon (SF); Thomas O'Hanlon (SDLP); John Óg O'Kane (SF)

Armagh DEA within Armagh City, Banbridge and Craigavon

Armagh City DEA (1993-2014) within Armagh

Armagh is one of the seven district electoral areas (DEA) in Armagh City, Banbridge and Craigavon, Northern Ireland. The district elects six members to Armagh City, Banbridge and Craigavon Borough Council and contains the wards of Blackwatertown, Cathedral, Demesne, Keady, Navan and The Mall. Armagh forms part of the Newry and Armagh constituencies for the Northern Ireland Assembly and UK Parliament.

It was created for the 1985 local elections, where it was called Armagh City until 2014. It replaced Armagh Area D which had existed since 1973, and originally contained five wards (Abbey Park, Callan Bridge, Demesne, Downs, Observatory and The Mall). For the 2014 local elections it gained most of the abolished Crossmore DEA.

== Councillors ==
Election	Councillor (party)	Councillor (party)	Councillor (party)	Councillor (party)	Councillor (party)	Councillor (party)
2023	Fergal Donnelly (Sinn Féin)	Sarah Duffy (Sinn Féin)	Ashley Mallon (Sinn Féin)	John Óg O'Kane (Sinn Féin)	Thomas O'Hanlon (SDLP)	Scott Armstrong (DUP)
February 2022 co-option	Fergal Donnelly (Sinn Féin)	Darren McNally (Sinn Féin)	Jackie Donnelly (Sinn Féin)	Grainne O'Neill (SDLP)	Thomas O'Hanlon (SDLP)	Sam Nicholson (UUP)
January 2021 co-option	Garath Keating (Sinn Féin)	Darren McNally (Sinn Féin)	Jackie Donnelly (Sinn Féin)	Grainne O'Neill (SDLP)	Thomas O'Hanlon (SDLP)	Sam Nicholson (UUP)
2019	Garath Keating (Sinn Féin)	Darren McNally (Sinn Féin)	Jackie Donnelly (Sinn Féin)	Mealla Campbell (SDLP)	Thomas O'Hanlon (SDLP)	Sam Nicholson (UUP)
2014	Garath Keating (Sinn Féin)	Darren McNally (Sinn Féin)	Freda Donnelly (DUP)	Mealla Campbell (SDLP)	Thomas O'Hanlon (SDLP)	Sam Nicholson (UUP)
2011	Cathy Rafferty (Sinn Féin)	Noel Sheridan (Sinn Féin)	Freda Donnelly (DUP)	Mealla Campbell (SDLP)	Roy McCartney (Sinn Féin)	Sylvia McRoberts (UUP)
2005	Cathy Rafferty (Sinn Féin)	Noel Sheridan (Sinn Féin)	Freda Donnelly (DUP)	Mealla Campbell (SDLP)	Pat Brannigan (SDLP)	Sylvia McRoberts (UUP)
2001	Cathy Rafferty (Sinn Féin)	Patrick McMagee (Sinn Féin)	Freda Donnelly (DUP)	Anna Brolly (SDLP)	Pat Brannigan (SDLP)	Sylvia McRoberts (UUP)
1997	Noel Sheridan (Sinn Féin)	Seán McGirr (Sinn Féin)	Gordon Frazer (UUP)	Anna Brolly (SDLP)	Pat Brannigan (SDLP)	Sylvia McRoberts (UUP)
1993	Noel Sheridan (Sinn Féin)	John Agnew (SDLP)	Gordon Frazer (UUP)	Anna Brolly (SDLP)	Pat Brannigan (SDLP)	Sylvia McRoberts (UUP)
1989	Seamus Hart (Sinn Féin)	John Agnew (SDLP)	George Macartney (UUP)	Anna Brolly (SDLP)	Pat Brannigan (SDLP)	John Doogan (UUP)
1985	Thomas Carroll (Sinn Féin)	John Agnew (SDLP)	George Macartney (UUP)	Geoffrey Knipe (DUP)	Pat Brannigan (SDLP)	John Doogan (UUP)

== 2023 election ==
2019: 3 x Sinn Féin, 2 x SDLP, 1 x UUP

2023: 4 x Sinn Féin, 1 x SDLP, 1 x DUP

2019–2023 change: Sinn Féin and DUP gain from SDLP and UUP

Armagh - 6 seats
Party	Candidate	FPv%	Count					
Party	Candidate	FPv%	1	2	3	4	5	6
Sinn Féin	Fergal Donnelly*	15.89%	2,158					
DUP	Scott Armstrong	14.16%	1,924	1,943				
SDLP	Thomas O'Hanlon*	12.18%	1,654	1,758	1,886	1,898.30	2,591.30	
Sinn Féin	Sarah Duffy	10.37%	1,409	1,442	1,498	1,663.90	1,864.70	2,091.70
Sinn Féin	Ashley Mallon	12.23%	1,661	1,694	1,716	1,729.60	1,782.20	1,848.20
Sinn Féin	John Óg O'Kane	11.10%	1,508	1,526	1,547	1,560.90	1,689.40	1,794.40
UUP	Sam Nicholson*	9.78%	1,328	1,329	1,442	1,442.20	1,504.20	1,572.20
SDLP	Gráinne O'Neill*	7.11%	966	1,006	1,263	1,271.80		
Alliance	Hanagh Winter	4.55%	619	638				
Aontú	Daniel Connolly	2.63%	357					
Electorate: 22,800 Valid: 13,584 (59.58%) Spoilt: 205 Quota: 1,941 Turnout: 13,789 (60.48%)

== 2019 election ==
2014: 2 x Sinn Féin, 2 x SDLP, 1 x UUP, 1 x DUP

2019: 3 x Sinn Féin, 2 x SDLP, 1 x UUP

2014-2019 change: Sinn Féin gain from DUP

Armagh - 6 seats
Party	Candidate	FPv%	Count				
Party	Candidate	FPv%	1	2	3	4	5
Sinn Féin	Garath Keating* †	16.01%	2,037				
Sinn Féin	Jackie Donnelly	13.18%	1,677	1,680	1,761.3	1,818.1	
SDLP	Mealla Campbell* †	9.79%	1,246	1,250	1,267.8	1,550.6	1,819.6
SDLP	Thomas O'Hanlon*	11.72%	1,491	1,493	1,502.2	1,615.6	1,811.5
UUP	Sam Nicholson*	13.34%	1,697	1,699	1,699	1,764	1,775
Sinn Féin	Darren McNally*	11.11%	1,413	1,415	1,493.8	1,522.3	1,680.3
DUP	Freda Donnelly*	12.87%	1,638	1,638	1,638.3	1,649.3	1,670.6
Aontú	Martin Kelly	6.46%	822	830	840.1	903.5	
Alliance	Jackie Coade	5.30%	674	677	681.9		
Independent	Pol Oh-Again	0.22%	28				
Electorate: 21,982 Valid: 12,723 (57.88%) Spoilt: 191 Quota: 1,818 Turnout: 12,914 (58.75%)

== 2014 election ==
2011: 3 x Sinn Féin, 1 x SDLP, 1 x UUP, 1 x DUP

2014: 2 x Sinn Féin, 2 x SDLP, 1 x UUP, 1 x DUP

2011-2014 change: SDLP gain from Sinn Féin

Armagh - 6 seats
Party	Candidate	FPv%	Count					
Party	Candidate	FPv%	1	2	3	4	5	6
Sinn Féin	Garath Keating*	20.13%	2,298					
SDLP	Thomas O'Hanlon*	14.94%	1,705					
Sinn Féin	Darren McNally*	12.23%	1,396	1,681.07				
UUP	Sam Nicholson	11.64%	1,329	1,329.58	1,389.87	2,010.87		
DUP	Freda Donnelly*	9.59%	1,095	1,096.16	1,172.16	1,435.16	1,790.51	
SDLP	Mealla Campbell*	11.83%	1,350	1,403.36	1,496.52	1,515.81	1,537.89	1,690.77
Sinn Féin	Gerard White*	8.60%	982	1,287.08	1,297.66	1,300.66	1,301.35	1,307.23
UUP	Joy Rollston*	7.69%	878	878.29	951.29			
UKIP	Adam Watt	2.10%	240	241.74				
Alliance	Mohammad Zahid	1.23%	140	144.35				
Electorate: 21,049 Valid: 11,413 (54.22%) Spoilt: 221 Quota: 1,631 Turnout: 11,634 (55.26%)

== 2011 election ==
2005: 2 x Sinn Féin, 2 x SDLP, 1 x UUP, 1 x DUP

2011: 3 x Sinn Féin, 1 x SDLP, 1 x UUP, 1 x DUP

2005-2011 change: Sinn Féin gain from SDLP

Armagh City - 6 seats
Party	Candidate	FPv%	Count				
Party	Candidate	FPv%	1	2	3	4	5
Sinn Féin	Cathy Rafferty*	18.62%	1,001				
UUP	Sylvia McRoberts*	16.78%	902				
Sinn Féin	Noel Sheridan*	16.09%	865				
DUP	Freda Donnelly*	12.98%	698	698.72	806.56		
Sinn Féin	Roy McCartney	10.40%	559	743.08	744.36	816.74	
SDLP	Mealla Campbell*	13.02%	700	724.96	732.64	743.2	757.94
SDLP	Pat Brannigan*	12.13%	652	670.72	686.08	694.55	705.88
Electorate: 9,993 Valid: 5,377 (53.81%) Spoilt: 127 Quota: 769 Turnout: 5,504 (55.08%)

== 2005 election ==
2001: 2 x Sinn Féin, 2 x SDLP, 1 x DUP, 1 x UUP

2005: 2 x Sinn Féin, 2 x SDLP, 1 x DUP, 1 x UUP

2001-2005 change: No change

Armagh City - 6 seats
Party	Candidate	FPv%	Count						
Party	Candidate	FPv%	1	2	3	4	5	6	7
DUP	Freda Donnelly*	15.97%	1,004						
SDLP	Pat Brannigan*	14.82%	932						
UUP	Sylvia McRoberts*	14.81%	931						
Sinn Féin	Cathy Rafferty*	14.28%	898	898.22	932.22				
Sinn Féin	Noel Sheridan	10.16%	639	639.22	680.66	1,103.66			
SDLP	Mealla Bratton	7.44%	468	511.78	734.72	754.72	814.72	828.72	854.31
Independent	John Nixon	9.40%	591	618.08	647.5	688.5	782.5	793.5	794.43
Sinn Féin	John Crowley	7.81%	491	491.22	498.22				
SDLP	Michael Carson	5.31%	334	366.78					
Electorate: 9,743 Valid: 6,288 (64.54%) Spoilt: 119 Quota: 899 Turnout: 6,407 (65.76%)

== 2001 election ==
1997: 2 x SDLP, 2 x Sinn Féin, 2 x UUP

2001: 2 x SDLP, 2 x Sinn Féin, 1 x UUP, 1 x DUP

1997-2001 change: DUP gain from UUP

Armagh City - 6 seats
Party	Candidate	FPv%	Count									
Party	Candidate	FPv%	1	2	3	4	5	6	7	8	9	10
Sinn Féin	Patrick McNamee	16.95%	1,261									
Sinn Féin	Cathy Rafferty	12.11%	901	1,059.24	1,078.24							
SDLP	Pat Brannigan*	13.62%	1,013	1,018.6	1,043.76	1,142.76						
UUP	Sylvia McRoberts*	11.67%	868	868.48	883.12	890.12	891.84	891.84	1,333.84			
DUP	Freda Donnelly	11.58%	861	861	867	868	868	868	943	1,159.48		
SDLP	Anna Brolly*	4.97%	370	373.2	395.36	503.12	553.86	559.86	562.86	588.28	644.04	1,030.66
Independent	John Nixon	8.69%	646	663.12	708.6	741.4	745.7	749.7	753.7	763.54	779.94	902.92
SDLP	Michael Carson	6.13%	456	461.76	482.24	574.52	596.88	600.88	601.88	619.92	639.6	
UUP	Gordon Frazer*	7.10%	528	528	546	547	547	547				
SDLP	Mealla Bratton	4.37%	325	329.8	353.96							
NI Women's Coalition	Margaret Connolly	2.81%	209	211.56								
Electorate: 10,014 Valid: 7,438 (74.28%) Spoilt: 170 Quota: 1,063 Turnout: 7,608 (75.97%)

== 1997 election ==
1993: 3 x SDLP, 2 x UUP, 1 x Sinn Féin

1997: 2 x SDLP, 2 x UUP, 2 x Sinn Féin

1993-1997 change: Sinn Féin gain from SDLP

Armagh City - 6 seats
Party	Candidate	FPv%	Count				
Party	Candidate	FPv%	1	2	3	4	5
SDLP	Pat Brannigan*	19.23%	1,251				
SDLP	Anna Brolly*	8.41%	547	792.7	938.32		
UUP	Sylvia McRoberts*	13.81%	898	900.34	949.34		
UUP	Gordon Frazer*	11.52%	749	750.04	774.04	1,279.04	
Sinn Féin	Noel Sheridan*	12.99%	845	851.5	858.8	858.8	859.8
Sinn Féin	Seán McGirr	12.93%	841	847.24	857.02	858.02	858.02
SDLP	Michael Carson	8.16%	531	572.08	639.98	642.98	699.98
DUP	Noel Donnelly	8.13%	529	529.52	532.52		
Alliance	Ryan Williams	2.57%	167	171.68			
SDLP	Ann McKenna	2.24%	146	157.44			
Electorate: 10,035 Valid: 6,504 (64.81%) Spoilt: 129 Quota: 930 Turnout: 6,633 (66.10%)

== 1993 election ==
1989: 3 x SDLP, 2 x UUP, 1 x Sinn Féin

1993: 3 x SDLP, 2 x UUP, 1 x Sinn Féin

1989-1993 change: No change

Armagh City - 6 seats
Party	Candidate	FPv%	Count				
Party	Candidate	FPv%	1	2	3	4	5
SDLP	John Agnew*	18.75%	1,156				
SDLP	Pat Brannigan*	16.42%	1,012				
UUP	Gordon Frazer	16.09%	992				
Sinn Féin	Noel Sheridan	15.59%	961				
SDLP	Anna Brolly*	11.52%	710	981.18			
UUP	Sylvia McRoberts	10.45%	644	645.82	758.46	839.31	860.89
DUP	Harold Carson	11.19%	690	691.82	709.42	735.6	743.92
Electorate: 9,590 Valid: 6,165 (64.29%) Spoilt: 182 Quota: 881 Turnout: 6,347 (66.18%)

== 1989 election ==
1985: 2 x SDLP, 2 x UUP, 1 x Sinn Féin, 1 x DUP

1989: 3 x SDLP, 2 x UUP, 1 x Sinn Féin

1985-1989 change: SDLP gain from DUP

Armagh City - 6 seats
Party	Candidate	FPv%	Count					
Party	Candidate	FPv%	1	2	3	4	5	6
SDLP	John Agnew*	16.07%	1,019					
UUP	George Macartney*	15.44%	979					
UUP	John Doogan*	14.16%	898					
SDLP	Pat Brannigan*	14.08%	893	967.69				
SDLP	Anna Brolly	12.87%	816	841.19	841.26	897.96	996.96	
Sinn Féin	Seamus Hart	8.51%	540	544.18	544.18	545.08	576.81	881.64
DUP	Harold Carson	10.41%	660	660.33	666.56	666.56	672.93	673.93
Sinn Féin	Stephen Fields	4.81%	305	307.09	307.09	307.54	325.76	
Workers' Party	Patrick McCusker	3.66%	232	235.74	236.65	237.91		
Electorate: 9,628 Valid: 6,342 (65.87%) Spoilt: 202 Quota: 907 Turnout: 6,544 (67.97%)

== 1985 election ==
1985: 2 x SDLP, 2 x UUP, 1 x Sinn Féin, 1 x DUP

Armagh City - 6 seats
Party	Candidate	FPv%	Count					
Party	Candidate	FPv%	1	2	3	4	5	6
Sinn Féin	Thomas Carroll	16.11%	970					
SDLP	John Agnew*	12.27%	739	762.94	920.94			
SDLP	Pat Brannigan*	10.16%	612	622.92	861.42			
UUP	John Doogan	10.71%	645	645.14	646.14	646.14	901.14	
UUP	George Macartney*	10.30%	620	620.14	625.14	625.9	871.9	
DUP	Geoffrey Knipe	12.55%	756	756.14	757.14	757.14	816.14	854.33
Ind. Nationalist	Bernard McManus*	10.63%	640	699.78	773.84	832.36	835.36	835.93
UUP	Robert Orr	9.37%	564	564	565	565		
SDLP	Oliver Tobin	7.90%	476	487.62				
Electorate: 9,766 Valid: 6,022 (61.66%) Spoilt: 100 Quota: 861 Turnout: 6,122 (62.69%)
