= Paul Berry (politician) =

Northern Irish unionist politician

Member of Armagh, Banbridge and Craigavon District Council
- Incumbent
- Assumed office 22 May 2014
- Preceded by: Council established
- Constituency: Cusher

Member of Armagh City and District Council
- In office 7 June 2001 – 22 May 2014
- Preceded by: Sharon McClelland
- Succeeded by: Council abolished
- Constituency: Cusher

Member of the Northern Ireland Assembly for Newry and Armagh
- In office 25 June 1998 – 7 March 2007
- Preceded by: New Creation
- Succeeded by: William Irwin

Personal details
- Born: 3 June 1976 (age 50) Craigavon, Northern Ireland
- Party: Independent Unionist (2006 - present); DUP (1992–2006)
- Spouse: Lorna Berry

Paul Berry (born 3 June 1976) is a Northern Irish Independent Unionist politician, serving as an Armagh City, Banbridge and Craigavon Borough Councillor for the Cusher DEA since 2014.

He was previously a Member of the Legislative Assembly (MLA) for Newry and Armagh from 1998 to 2007.

Elected as a Democratic Unionist Party (DUP) candidate, Berry left the party in 2006 to sit as an Independent Unionist after a scandal about his alleged sex act with a male masseur in a Belfast hotel.

== Early life ==
Berry was born in Craigavon, County Armagh, and brought up in Tandragee, where he was educated at local state schools and colleges, following which he was employed in the textile industry. He joined the Democratic Unionist Party (DUP) at the age of 16, the same age at which he began gospel singing in churches in the North Armagh and Banbridge areas.

== Political career ==
With his high profile as a singer, Berry was elected, aged 22, the youngest MLA in the first Northern Ireland Assembly as a DUP representative for the Newry and Armagh constituency in the 1998 election, and was re-elected in the 2003 election.

He was elected to Armagh City and District Council in 2001, representing the Cusher District, and re-elected in the 2005 local elections.

In the 2005 general election Berry was the DUP candidate for Newry and Armagh constituency. After a story about an alleged sexual encounter with a gay masseur broke in the Sunday World newspaper, Berry resigned from the DUP after having been suspended from the party. The story damaged Berry's reputation as an anti gay Christian fundamentalist.

An active member of the Orange Order, Berry was on the traditionalist, fundamentalist wing of the DUP. In the 2007 assembly election he stood as an Independent candidate, opposed to the DUP policy of implementing the St Andrews Agreement, but failed to be elected.

Berry continues to perform as a gospel singer, and has released three compilations. He is married to Lorna and now works in Tandragee as a local estate agent.

He was re-elected to Armagh City District Council at the 2011 election.

At the 2014 local elections, Berry was elected onto the successor Armagh City, Banbridge and Craigavon Borough Council, again representing the Cusher District. He was re-elected in 2019 and 2023.

He stood again in Newry and Armagh at the 2016 Assembly election, but was not elected.

Northern Ireland Assembly
New assembly	MLA for Newry and Armagh; 1998–2007	Succeeded by William Irwin
