= Dominic Bradley =

Irish politician (born 1960)

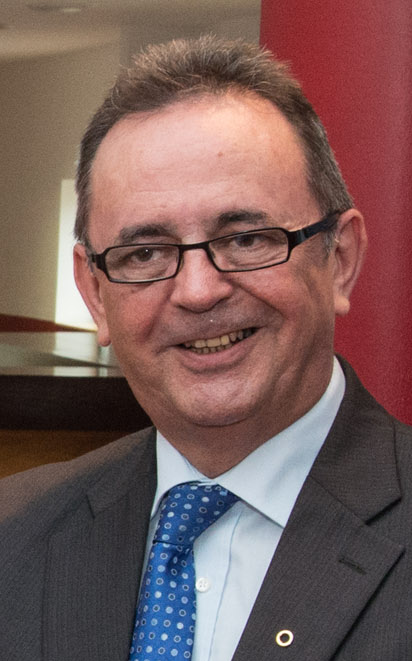

Member of the Legislative Assembly for Newry and Armagh
- In office 26 November 2003 – 7 May 2016
- Preceded by: Seamus Mallon
- Succeeded by: Justin McNulty

Personal details
- Born: 29 August 1960 (age 66) Bessbrook, County Armagh, Northern Ireland
- Party: SDLP
- Spouse: Mary McManus
- Education: University of Ulster; Queen's University Belfast
- Occupation: Teacher
- Website: Official Website

Dominic Bradley (Irish Doiminic Ó Brolcháin) is an Irish former Social Democratic and Labour Party (SDLP) politician who was a Member of the Legislative Assembly (MLA) for Newry and Armagh from 2003 to 2016. As an MLA, he was the SDLP Spokesperson for Education and for the Irish language.

A graduate of St. Paul's High School, Bessbrook, Bradley is a teacher from County Armagh. He acted as Director of Elections for Seamus Mallon MP and for the SDLP in the Newry and Mourne District Council area.

Membership:

- Member of the National Executive Association for School's Drama
- Founder of Tí Chulainn Cultural Activity Centre, An Mullach Bán.
- Member of National Executive National Association of Teachers of Irish.

Bradley is an Irish language speaker, and is education editor of the daily newspaper Lá Nua. He writes in Irish for a number of other newspapers. In October 2011, he was sanctioned by speaker for talking too long without asking a question.

== Education ==
He studied at Queen's University, Belfast for a joint honours degree in English Literature and Language. After his degree he stayed on at Belfast and studied for a Postgraduate Certificate in Education. As a mature student he went to the University of Ulster where he studied for and attained a master's degree in Irish Language and Literature.

Northern Ireland Assembly
Preceded by Seamus Mallon	MLA for Newry and Armagh; 2003–2016	Succeeded by Justin McNulty
