= Pat O'Rawe =

Member of the Northern Ireland Assembly for Newry and Armagh
- In office 26 November 2003 – 7 March 2007
- Preceded by: John Fee
- Succeeded by: Cathal Boylan

Personal details
- Died: 12 December 2017
- Party: Sinn Féin

Patricia O'Rawe (died 12 December 2017) was an Irish republican who formerly served as a politician in Northern Ireland.

O'Rawe was first elected to Armagh City and District Council in 2001, representing Sinn Féin. At the 2003 Northern Ireland Assembly election, she was elected as a representative in Newry and Armagh. However, she failed to be re-selected at convention by local party members prior to the 2007 election. In April 2007, O'Rawe resigned from Armagh District Council and was succeeded by Mary Doyle. She died on 12 December 2017.

Civic offices
Preceded by Anna Brolly	Mayor of Armagh; 2003 – 2004	Succeeded by Eric Speers
Northern Ireland Assembly
Preceded by John Fee	MLA for Newry and Armagh; 2003–2007	Succeeded by Cathal Boylan
