= William Irwin (Unionist politician) =

British politician (born 1956)

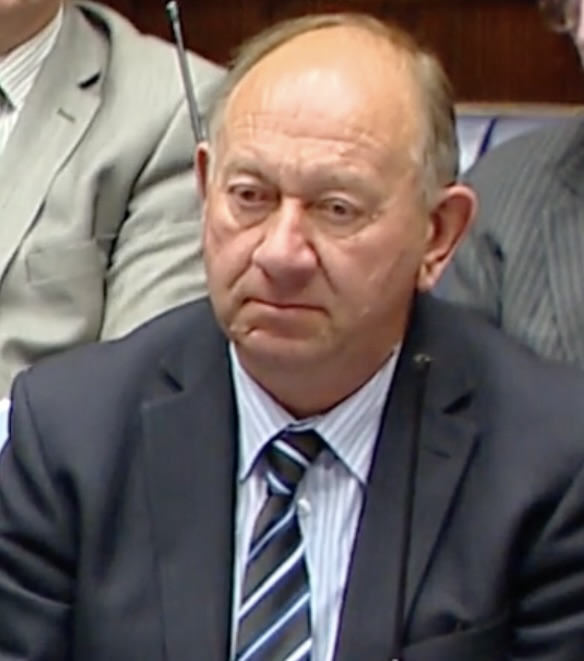

Member of the Northern Ireland Assembly for Newry and Armagh
- In office 7 March 2007 – 12 December 2025
- Preceded by: Paul Berry
- Succeeded by: Gareth Wilson

Member of Armagh City and District Council
- In office 5 May 2005 – 22 May 2014
- Preceded by: Brian Hutchinson
- Succeeded by: "Council abolished"
- Constituency: The Orchard

Personal details
- Born: 12 December 1956 (age 69) Kilmore, Northern Ireland
- Party: Democratic Unionist Party

William Irwin is a Democratic Unionist Party (DUP) politician who served as a Member of the Northern Ireland Assembly (MLA) for Newry and Armagh from 2007 to 2025. Irwin was the DUP's Spokesperson for Agriculture and Rural Affairs.

== Background ==
Irwin entered politics after his son, Philip, drowned in a swimming pool, and he met DUP founder, Ian Paisley. "He was only 15. Dr Paisley came and prayed with us and offered great support.

Irwin first stood for election on Armagh City and District Council in 2001, unsuccessfully contesting The Orchard DEA. He was elected to the District in 2005, and was later re-elected in 2011.

He was elected to the Northern Ireland Assembly at the 2007 Assembly election, as an MLA for Newry and Armagh.

Irwin stood in the Newry and Armagh constituency at both the 2017 and 2019 General Elections, finishing second on each occasion with 24.6% and 21.7% of the vote respectively.

Outside of politics, Irwin is a local dairy farmer.

Civic offices
Preceded by John Campbell	Mayor of Armagh; 2006–2007	Succeeded by Charles Rollston
Northern Ireland Assembly
Preceded by Paul Berry	MLA for Newry and Armagh; 2007–present	Incumbent
