= 2014 Armagh, Banbridge and Craigavon District Council election =

2014 Northern Irish local government election

2014 Armagh, Banbridge and Craigavon Council election
- 22 May 2014

All 41 council seats 21 seats needed for a majority
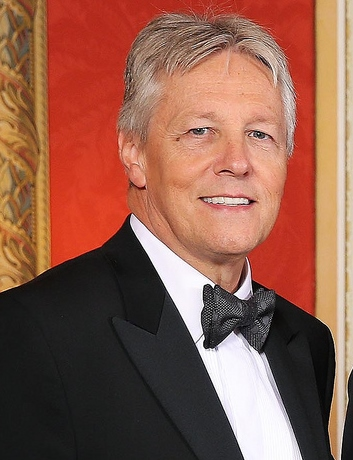

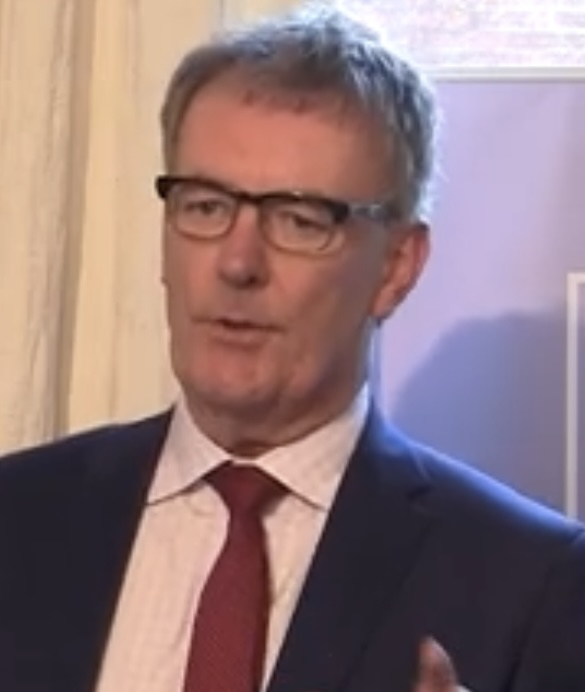

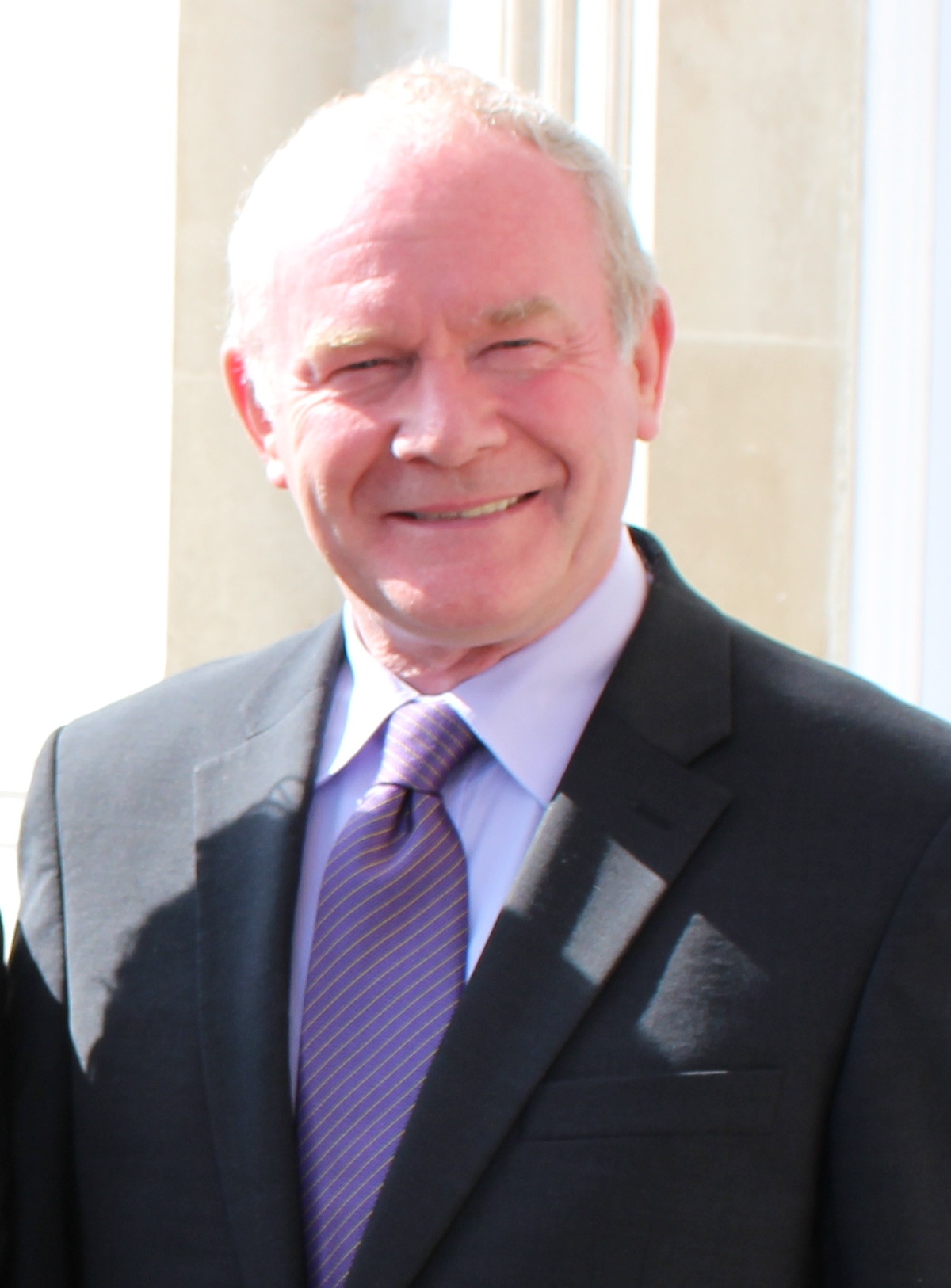

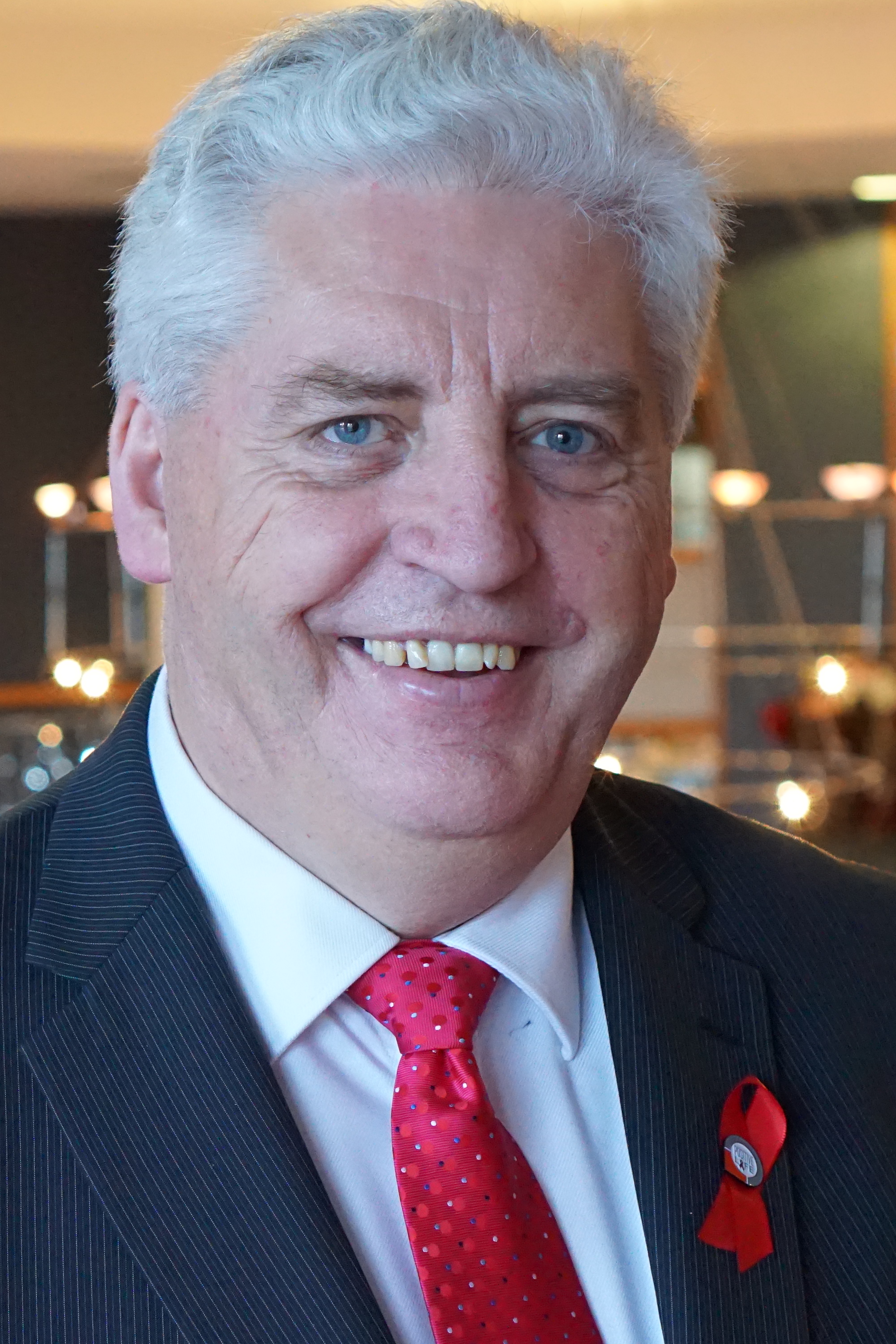

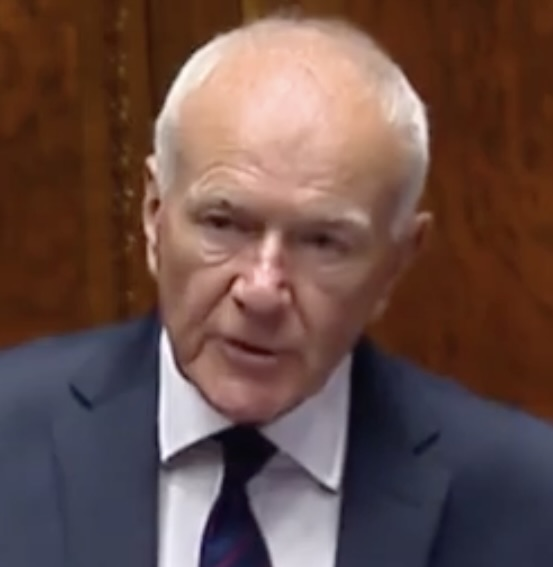
	First party	Second party	Third party
Leader	Peter Robinson	Mike Nesbitt	Martin McGuinness
Party	DUP	UUP	Sinn Féin
Seats won	13	12	8
Seat change	New council	New council	New council
	Fourth party	Fifth party	Sixth party
Leader	Alasdair McDonnell	David McNarry
Party	SDLP	UKIP	Ind. Unionist
Seats won	6	1	1
Seat change	New council	New council	New council
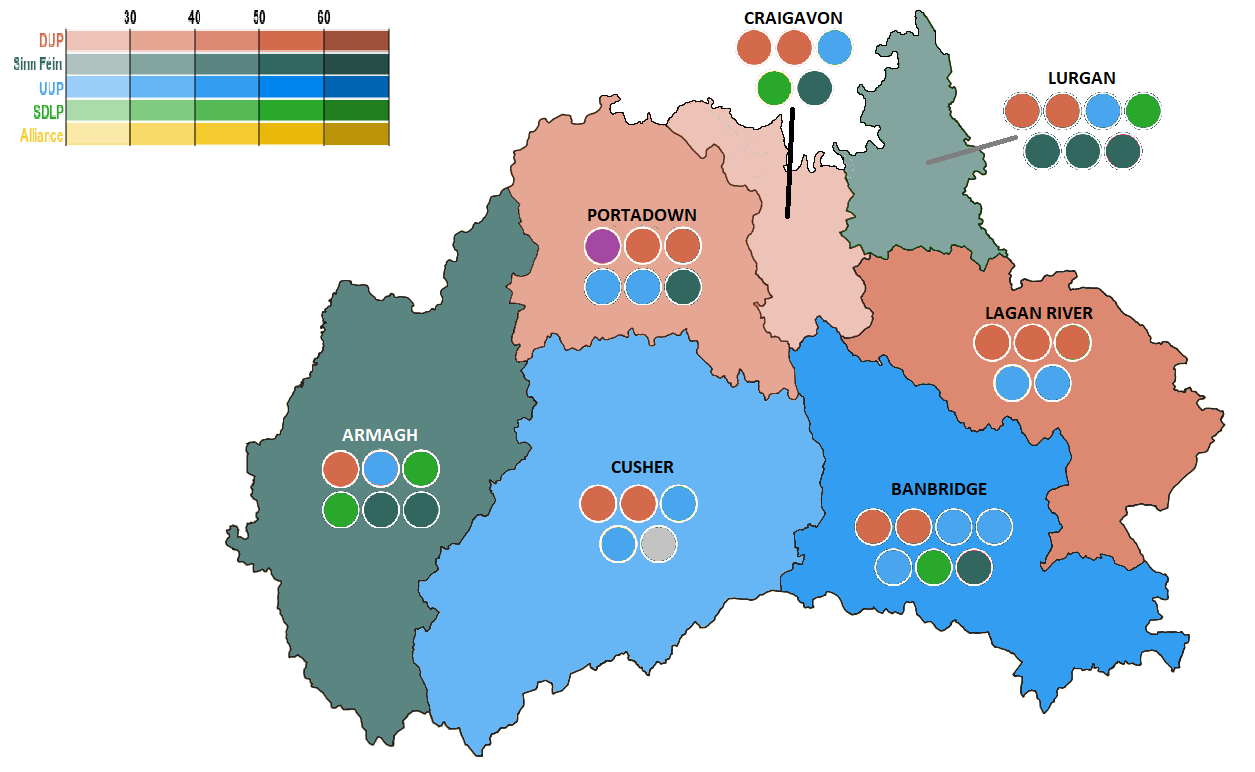
- Armagh City, Banbridge and Craigavon 2014 Council Election Results by DEA (Shaded by plurality of FPVs)

The first election to Armagh City, Banbridge and Craigavon Borough Council, part of the Northern Ireland local elections on 22 May 2014, returned 41 members to the newly-formed council via Single Transferable Vote. The Democratic Unionist Party won a plurality of seats, although the Ulster Unionist Party attracted the most first-preference votes.

== Election results ==
Party	Seats	First Pref. votes	FPv%
DUP	13	17,734	24.56
UUP	12	18,882	26.14
Sinn Féin	8	15,160	20.99
SDLP	6	10,083	13.96
Ind. Unionist	1	2,590	3.59
UKIP	1	1,322	1.83
Alliance	0	2,440	3.38
TUV	0	1,852	2.56
PUP	0	1,274	1.76
NI21	0	884	1.22
Totals	41	72,221	100.00

== Districts summary ==
Results of the Armagh, Banbridge and Craigavon District Council election, 2014 by district
Ward	%	Cllrs	%	Cllrs	%	Cllrs	%	Cllrs	%	Cllrs	%	Cllrs	%	Cllrs	Total Cllrs
Ward	DUP		UUP		Sinn Féin		SDLP		UKIP		Alliance		Others		Total Cllrs
Armagh	9.6	1	19.3	1	41.0	2	26.8	2	2.1	0	1.2	0	0.0	0	6
Banbridge	23.8	2	41.0	3	12.3	0	14.5	1	0.0	0	5.1	0	3.3	0	7
Craigavon	25.4	2	21.7	1	22.5	1	15.1	1	0.0	0	4.7	0	10.6	0	5
Cusher	22.0	1	38.4	2	9.7	0	11.4	1	0.0	0	0.0	0	18.5	1	5
Lagan River	40.7	3	31.4	2	3.2	0	3.8	0	0.0	0	6.2	0	14.7	0	5
Lurgan	22.6	2	12.5	1	35.8	3	14.4	1	0.0	0	5.1	0	9.6	0	7
Portadown	32.7	2	19.4	2	16.7	1	8.7	0	7.8	1	2.0	0	12.7	0	5
Total	24.6	13	26.1	12	21.0	8	14.0	6	1.8	1	3.4	0	9.1	1	41

== District results ==
=== Armagh ===
2014: 2 x Sinn Féin, 2 x SDLP, 1 x UUP, 1 x DUP

Armagh - 6 seats
Party	Candidate	FPv%	Count					
Party	Candidate	FPv%	1	2	3	4	5	6
Sinn Féin	Garath Keating*	20.13%	2,298					
SDLP	Thomas O'Hanlon*	14.94%	1,705					
Sinn Féin	Darren McNally*	12.23%	1,396	1,681.07				
UUP	Sam Nicholson	11.64%	1,329	1,329.58	1,389.87	2,010.87		
DUP	Freda Donnelly*	9.59%	1,095	1,096.16	1,172.16	1,435.16	1,790.51	
SDLP	Mealla Campbell*	11.83%	1,350	1,403.36	1,496.52	1,515.81	1,537.89	1,690.77
Sinn Féin	Gerard White*	8.60%	982	1,287.08	1,297.66	1,300.66	1,301.35	1,307.23
UUP	Joy Rollston*	7.69%	878	878.29	951.29			
UKIP	Adam Watt	2.10%	240	241.74				
Alliance	Mohammad Zahid	1.23%	140	144.35				
Electorate: 21,049 Valid: 11,413 (54.22%) Spoilt: 221 Quota: 1,631 Turnout: 11,634 (55.26%)

=== Banbridge ===
2014: 3 x UUP, 2 x DUP, 1 x SDLP, 1 x Sinn Féin

Banbridge - 7 seats
Party	Candidate	FPv%	Count						
Party	Candidate	FPv%	1	2	3	4	5	6	7
UUP	Glenn Barr*	17.49%	1,999						
UUP	Ian Burns*	12.01%	1,373	1,724.12					
UUP	Elizabeth Ingram*	11.53%	1,318	1,431.68					
DUP	Paul Greenfield	8.45%	966	986.44	1,090.04	1,114.12	1,114.12	1,137.24	1,554.24
DUP	Junior McCrum*	9.01%	1,030	1,059.68	1,157.68	1,180.92	1,180.92	1,217.32	1,492.32
Sinn Féin	Brendan Curran* †	7.54%	862	862.56	862.56	866.56	1,291.56	1,333.56	1,334.56
SDLP	Seamus Doyle*	8.53%	975	976.96	982.84	1,023.96	1,079.96	1,259.88	1,275.68
SDLP	Marie Hamilton*	5.95%	680	682.8	685.04	720.6	771.6	1,003.56	1,028.36
DUP	Ian Wilson	6.38%	730	755.48	814.56	843.08	843.08	868.04	
Alliance	Sheila McQuaid*	5.07%	579	582.92	592.72	740.52	753.52		
Sinn Féin	Kevin Savage	4.79%	547	547	547	555			
NI21	Emma Hutchinson	3.25%	371	374.92	389.48				
Electorate: 23,380 Valid: 11,430 (48.89%) Spoilt: 162 Quota: 1,429 Turnout: 11,592 (49.58%)

=== Craigavon ===
Craigavon - 5 seats
Party	Candidate	FPv%	Count								
Party	Candidate	FPv%	1	2	3	4	5	6	7	8	9
UUP	Kenneth Twyble*	16.41%	1,389	1,389	1,451						
DUP	Robert Smith*	14.76%	1,250	1,250	1,265	1,430					
SDLP	Declan McAlinden*	9.93%	841	858	893	896	896.88	896.88	1,247.52	1,416.52	
Sinn Féin	Fergal Lennon ‡	10.75%	910	1,023	1,044	1,049	1,049.88	1,049.88	1,111.88	1,236.88	
DUP	Margaret Tinsley*	10.62%	899	899	912	964	967.52	981.6	983.6	999.71	1,303.71
Sinn Féin	Tommy O'Connor*	9.24%	782	837	844	844	844	844	881	991	995
UUP	Julie Flaherty	5.26%	445	445	476	633	659.4	661.71	667.47	694.58	
Independent	Kieran Corr	5.79%	490	494	542	545	546.76	546.98	596.98		
SDLP	Thomas Larkham	5.19%	439	451	537	539	544.28	544.28			
PUP	Brian Cummings	4.85%	411	411	424						
Alliance	John Cleland	4.69%	397	401							
Sinn Féin	Vincent McAleenan	2.52%	213								
Electorate: 17,589 Valid: 8,466 (48.13%) Spoilt: 174 Quota: 1,412 Turnout: 8,640 (49.12%)

=== Cusher ===
Cusher - 5 seats
Party	Candidate	FPv%	Count			
Party	Candidate	FPv%	1	2	3	4
UUP	Jim Speers*	21.17%	2,221			
Independent	Paul Berry*	18.36%	1,927			
UUP	Gordon Kennedy*	17.27%	1,812			
SDLP	Sharon Haughey*	11.44%	1,200	1,229.52	1,235.52	1,949.52
DUP	Gareth Wilson*	12.25%	1,285	1,547.8	1,631.6	1,632.6
DUP	Tim McClelland	9.77%	1,025	1,195.88	1,273.18	1,281.18
Sinn Féin	Mary Doyle*	9.75%	1,023	1,023.48	1,024.48	
Electorate: 17,523 Valid: 10,493 (59.88%) Spoilt: 122 Quota: 1,749 Turnout: 10,615 (60.58%)

=== Lagan River ===
Lagan River - 5 seats
Party	Candidate	FPv%	Count								
Party	Candidate	FPv%	1	2	3	4	5	6	7	8	9
DUP	Mark Baxter*	16.00%	1,341	1,352	1,353	1,369	1,373	1,484			
DUP	Paul Rankin*	15.13%	1,268	1,308	1,311	1,322	1,335	1,484			
UUP	Marc Woods	12.21%	1,023	1,032	1,032	1,054	1,059	1,229	1,235.72	1,249.8	1,483.8
UUP	Carol Black* ‡	10.08%	845	867	871	904	919	1,023	1,035.6	1,049.68	1,450.68
DUP	Hazel Gamble*	9.59%	804	819	820	832	836	915	980.52	1,031.72	1,226.04
Alliance	Harry Hamilton	6.23%	522	546	570	715	1,034	1,053	1,053.84	1,053.84	1,080.84
UUP	Olive Mercer*	9.12%	764	775	776	795	811	909	909.84	916.24	
TUV	Samuel Morrison	9.14%	766	777	778	789	792				
SDLP	Maureen Litter	3.77%	316	321	527	553					
NI21	Neville Hutchinson	3.42%	287	302	314						
Sinn Féin	Keara Downey	3.25%	272	273							
Independent	Frazer McCammond	2.06%	173								
Electorate: 16,260 Valid: 8,381 (51.54%) Spoilt: 92 Quota: 1,397 Turnout: 8,473 (52.11%)

=== Lurgan ===
Lurgan - 7 seats
Party	Candidate	FPv%	Count													
Party	Candidate	FPv%	1	2	3	4	5	6	7	8	9	10	11	12	13	14
DUP	Carla Lockhart* †	17.50%	2,013													
SDLP	Joe Nelson*	7.29%	839	839.28	842.28	932.28	937.28	937.28	937.28	979.28	1,125.84	1,632.84				
UUP	Colin McCusker*	7.85%	903	997.64	1,011.92	1,011.92	1,052.32	1,133.4	1,306.68	1,307.96	1,353.8	1,357.8	1,364.68	1,802.68		
DUP	Philip Moutray* †	5.07%	583	920.68	931.24	931.24	973.88	1,054.84	1,169.36	1,169.92	1,199.6	1,210.16	1,211.02	1,520.02		
Sinn Féin	Máire Cairns †	8.71%	1,002	1,002.28	1,004.28	1,010.28	1,013.28	1,015.28	1,017.56	1,103.56	1,137.56	1,173.56	1,211.4	1,218.24	1,232.24	1,240.24
Sinn Féin	Keith Haughian	8.09%	930	930	931	936	939	939	940	1,043	1,085	1,133	1,184.6	1,185.44	1,189.44	1,193.44
Sinn Féin	Catherine Seeley* †	7.34%	844	844	844	851	854	854	856	945	971.28	1.009.28	1,076.36	1,080.92	1,089.92	1,102.92
Sinn Féin	Noel McGeown*	6.57%	756	757.12	758.12	761.12	764.12	764.12	765.12	975.12	1,004.12	1,059.12	1,085.78	1,086.78	1,091.78	1,093.78
UUP	Aaron Carson	4.67%	539	586.88	598.16	598.16	641.16	747.8	935.76	936.76	972.88	980.16	982.74			
SDLP	Pat McDade	5.63%	648	649.96	661.96	687.96	694.96	694.96	698.24	733.24	884.52					
Alliance	Peter Lavery	5.12%	589	592.36	654.76	660.76	677.04	679.32	684.6	700.6						
Sinn Féin	Liam Mackle*	5.10%	587	587.84	590.84	596.84	598.84	598.84	598.84							
TUV	Roy Ferguson	3.22%	370	390.72	392.72	393.72	443.68	537								
PUP	Lexi Davidson	2.79%	321	352.64	355.64	356.64	388.6									
UKIP	Jonny Johns	2.30%	264	276.88	280.16	281.44										
SDLP	Anna Ochal-Molenda	1.50%	173	173.28	175.28											
NI21	Stuart McClelland	1.23%	141	144.08												
Electorate: 23,950 Valid: 11,502 (48.03%) Spoilt: 233 Quota: 1,438 Turnout: 11,735 (49.00%)

=== Portadown ===
Portadown - 6 seats
Party	Candidate	FPv%	Count								
Party	Candidate	FPv%	1	2	3	4	5	6	7	8	9
DUP	Jonathan Buckley* †	14.19%	1,738								
Sinn Féin	Gemma McKenna* †	10.30%	929	939	939	939.13	941.13	1,592.13			
DUP	Darryn Causby*	11.21%	954	968	1,115.29	1,266.33	1,442.84	1,443.84	2,035.84		
UUP	Doug Beattie †	13.57%	1,089	1,127	1,150.53	1,224.92	1,399.7	1,399.7	1,504.75	1,738.75	
UUP	Arnold Hatch*	12.21%	955	994	1,003.23	1,041.62	1,121.66	1,123.66	1,203.29	1,368.29	1,546.29
UKIP	David Jones ‡	7.73%	818	841	847.11	978.37	1,246.67	1,256.8	1,323.01	1,361.01	1,387.01
SDLP	Eamon McNeill*	9.53%	917	1,002	1,002.39	1,004.39	1,005.39	1,138.39	1,145.39	1,149.39	1,149.39
DUP	Terry McWilliams*	7.56%	753	763	786.66	823.18	902.35	906.48			
Sinn Féin	Paul Duffy*	8.76%	827	838	838.52	838.52	841.52				
TUV	Paul Coleman	6.67%	716	720	728.19	818.71					
PUP	John Stevenson	5.05%	542	550	553.38						
Alliance	Pete Giffen	1.98%	213								
NI21	Kyle Thomas	0.79%	85								
Electorate: 20,556 Valid: 10,536 (51.26%) Spoilt: 196 Quota: 1,506 Turnout: 10,732 (52.21%)

* Incumbent

== Changes during the term ==
=== † Co-options ===
Co-option date	Electoral Area	Party	Outgoing	Co-optee	Reason
12 August 2016	Banbridge	Sinn Féin	Brendan Curran	Kevin Savage	Curran resigned his seat for health reasons.
2 February 2017	Portadown	Sinn Féin	Gemma McKenna	Paul Duffy	McKenna resigned her seat for personal reasons.
26 May 2016	Portadown	UUP	Doug Beattie	Julie Flaherty	Beattie was elected to the Northern Ireland Assembly.
8 June 2016	Lurgan	DUP	Carla Lockhart	Terry McWilliams	Lockhart was elected to the Northern Ireland Assembly.
8 June 2016	Lurgan	Sinn Féin	Catherine Seeley	Liam Mackle	Seeley was elected to the Northern Ireland Assembly.
4 Apr 2017	Portadown	DUP	Jonathan Buckley	Louise Templeton	Buckley was elected to the Northern Ireland Assembly.
18 June 2018	Lurgan	Sinn Féin	Máire Cairns	Catherine Nelson (Catherine Seeley)	Cairns resigned.
17 December 2018	Lurgan	DUP	Philip Moutray	Stephen Moutray	Moutray resigned.

=== ‡ Changes of affiliation ===
Date	Electoral Area	Name	Previous affiliation	New affiliation
14 Feb 2017	Lagan River	Carol Black	UUP	Independent
11 May 2018	Portadown	David Jones	UKIP	Independent
26 Feb 2018	Craigavon	Fergal Lennon	Sinn Féin	Aontú

Current composition: see Armagh City, Banbridge and Craigavon Borough Council.
