= Seamus Mallon =

Northern Ireland politician (1936–2020)

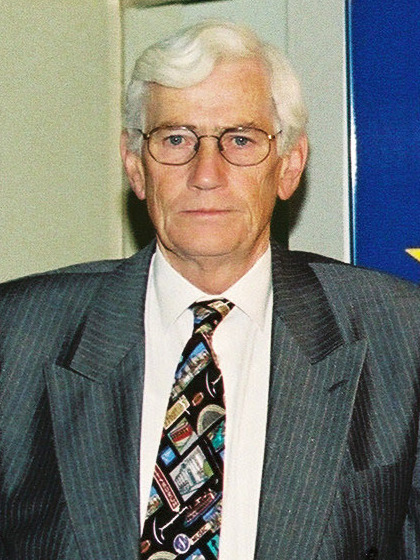
- Mallon in 1998

Deputy First Minister of Northern Ireland
- In office 1 July 1998 – 6 November 2001 Serving with David Trimble
- Preceded by: Office established
- Succeeded by: Mark Durkan

Deputy Leader of the Social Democratic and Labour Party
- In office 1979–2001
- Leader: John Hume
- Preceded by: John Hume
- Succeeded by: Bríd Rodgers

Member of the Legislative Assembly for Newry and Armagh
- In office 25 June 1998 – 26 November 2003
- Preceded by: Constituency established
- Succeeded by: Dominic Bradley

Member of Parliament for Newry and Armagh
- In office 23 January 1986 – 11 April 2005
- Preceded by: Jim Nicholson
- Succeeded by: Conor Murphy

Senator
- In office 13 May 1982 – 23 February 1983
- Taoiseach: Charles Haughey
- Constituency: Nominated by the Taoiseach

Personal details
- Born: Seamus Frederick Mallon; 17 August 1936 Markethill, County Armagh, Northern Ireland
- Died: 24 January 2020 (aged 83) Markethill, Northern Ireland
- Party: SDLP
- Spouse: Gertrude Cush (died 2016)
- Children: 1
- Education: St Mary's University College
- Profession: Teacher

Seamus Frederick Mallon (/ˈʃeɪməs ˈmælən/ SHAY-məs MAL-ən; 17 August 1936 – 24 January 2020) was an Irish politician who served as deputy First Minister of Northern Ireland from 1998 to 2001 and Deputy Leader of the Social Democratic and Labour Party (SDLP) from 1979 to 2001. He also sat in the House of Commons of the United Kingdom from 1986 to 2005.

== Background ==
Seamus Mallon was born in the largely Protestant village of Markethill to Jane (née O'Flaherty) and Francis Mallon, and was educated at the Abbey Christian Brothers Grammar School in Newry and St Patrick's Grammar School, Armagh. He came from a family of Republicans, and his father was a former IRA man who had fought in the Irish Civil War. His mother, Jane, also from a Republican family, was from Castlefin, a village in the east of County Donegal.

He trained to be a teacher at St Mary's University College, Belfast. As a career he (like his father) chose teaching, and became headmaster of St James's Primary School in Markethill. Mallon was also involved in the Gaelic Athletic Association (GAA), playing Gaelic football for the Armagh county team. He first played club football for Middletown during the 1950s then with Keady Dwyers, Queen's University and Crossmaglen Rangers.

He was also involved in amateur drama and wrote a play which won an All-Ireland amateur drama play award.

== Introduction to politics ==
During the 1960s, Mallon was involved in the civil rights movement, especially in his native County Armagh. He first got involved in the 1960s when trying to help a man and his family secure a council house, but was told by a local unionist councillor that "No Catholic pig or his litter will get a house here as long as I am here."

In 1979, when John Hume went from being deputy leader of the SDLP (under Gerry Fitt) to leader, Mallon became deputy leader. He was elected to the first power-sharing Assembly in 1973, and to the Northern Ireland Constitutional Convention in 1975 representing Armagh. Between May and December 1982 he was appointed by the then Taoiseach Charles Haughey to the Republic's upper house, Seanad Éireann.

Mallon was a strong advocate of non-violent nationalism, and opposed political violence. In an interview with Eilis O'Hanlon he recalled seeing his own close friend's dead body after being murdered by loyalists and having witnessed two RUC members bleeding to death after being murdered in an IRA ambush in Markethill.

== 1982 Assembly and Westminster ==
In 1982, Mallon was elected to the new Northern Ireland Assembly, set up as part of then-Secretary of State for Northern Ireland James Prior's rolling devolution. However, due to his membership of the Seanad he was, following a challenge by Unionist politicians, disqualified. Under legislation of the time, no elected member of a British parliament or regional assembly could serve in a parliament outside the United Kingdom or Commonwealth without losing their British seat. That restriction was removed with regard to the Oireachtas by the Disqualifications Act 2000.

In 1986, he was elected to Westminster as an MP for Newry and Armagh, a seat he held until 2005. In a 1993 parliamentary debate on anti-terrorism legislation Mallon addressed the ineffectiveness of these types of legislation: "From the very day and hour that the state was formed it has been sustained by draconian emergency legislation, military might, soldiers, not one police service but on certain occasions two and on others three, and by the inpouring of billions of pounds--according to the Secretary of State, £3.5 billion last year. There is a fundamental question to be asked outside of the legalities of the emergency provisions legislation, of the statistics and of the emotions that it engenders. Where a state or a statelet is formed with the weight of the British Government behind it in military and financial terms and in terms of the emergency provisions legislation, the Prevention of Terrorism Acts and the Special Powers Act and still the problem remains, is there not a fundamental question to ask? Is it not even more fundamental to ask why, after 72 years, all those measures have never brought peace, stability or unity of purpose to the north of Ireland?"

Mallon won the seat in a by-election to replace Jim Nicholson, who had resigned his seat in protest at the Anglo-Irish Agreement, along with all the other Northern Irish unionist MPs. Nicholson was the only MP to fail to be re-elected.

== Peace process and 1998 Assembly ==
Mallon was elected to the Forum for Peace and Reconciliation in 1994. He was a member of the SDLP team at the all-party negotiations (the 'Stormont talks') that opened in Belfast in June 1996. He has frequently been quoted as saying that the Good Friday Agreement, which resulted from the talks in 1998, was "Sunningdale for slow learners". The Good Friday Agreement led to the setting up of the Northern Ireland Assembly, which was elected in June 1998, with a power-sharing Executive. Mallon was elected as member for Newry and Armagh, and in December 1999 became Deputy First Minister of Northern Ireland, serving alongside Ulster Unionist Party leader David Trimble.

Mallon remained a strong opponent of IRA violence, and was also in favour of police reform in Northern Ireland.

== Retirement ==
He retired in 2001, along with John Hume, from the leadership of the SDLP. Mark Durkan replaced both, Hume as leader and Mallon as Deputy First Minister, when the Northern Ireland Executive was re-established following a suspension.

Mallon did not contest his seat in the Stormont Assembly in the 2003 elections, and stood down at the 2005 Westminster election. Dominic Bradley was nominated to contest the seat Mallon vacated, but failed to re-capture the seat as Conor Murphy of Sinn Féin won.

Mallon was conferred with the Freedom of Drogheda in 2018.

His autobiography, A Shared Home Place, written with Andy Pollak, was published in 2019.

In retirement, Mallon spent much of his time in County Donegal, his mother's native county.

== Personal life ==
During his time in politics, Mallon lived in his hometown of Markethill, in a house with bulletproof windows installed.

He was a lifelong smoker and drinker who suffered from heart problems throughout his life, having his first heart attack in 1980.

His wife Gertrude (née Cush) died in October 2016. Their daughter Órla is married with one child.

Mallon had retired to his second home in County Donegal for a while, but when his wife's health began to fail he moved back to Markethill to care for her, and continued to live in Markethill after her death.

Mallon died at his home in Markethill on 24 January 2020, aged 83. He had been treated for cancer before his death. SDLP Stormont leader, Nichola Mallon (no relation) paid tribute to Seamus Mallon in the Assembly; describing him as "a man of peace" and "an Irish political giant". Many world leaders paid tribute to Mallon after his death. Former US president Bill Clinton paid tribute by saying "Seamus never wavered from his vision for a shared future where neighbors of all faiths could live in dignity, or from the belief he shared with John Hume and the entire SDLP that nonviolence was the only way to reach that goal."

Northern Ireland Assembly (1973)
New assembly	Assembly Member for Armagh; 1973–1974	Assembly abolished
Northern Ireland Constitutional Convention
New convention	Member for Armagh; 1975–1976	Convention dissolved
Northern Ireland Assembly (1982)
New assembly	MPA for Armagh; 1982–1983	Succeeded by Jim Speers
Parliament of the United Kingdom
Preceded by Jim Nicholson	Member of Parliament for Newry and Armagh; 1986–2005	Succeeded by Conor Murphy
Northern Ireland Forum
New forum	Member for Newry and Armagh; 1996–1998	Forum dissolved
Northern Ireland Assembly
New assembly Good Friday Agreement	MLA for Newry and Armagh; 1998–2003	Succeeded by Dominic Bradley
Party political offices
Preceded by John Hume	Deputy Leader of the SDLP; 1979–2001	Succeeded by Bríd Rodgers
Political offices
New title Good Friday Agreement	deputy First Minister of Northern Ireland; 1998–2001	Succeeded by Mark Durkan
