= Gareth Wilson =

Northern Irish politician

Gareth Wilson MLA

Member of the Northern Ireland Assembly for Newry and Armagh
- Incumbent
- Assumed office 5 January 2026
- Preceded by: William Irwin

Armagh City, Banbridge and Craigavon Borough Councillor for Cusher
- In office 22 May 2014 – 12 December 2025
- Preceded by: New council

Armagh District Councillor for Cusher
- In office 5 May 2005 – 22 May 2014
- Preceded by: James Clayton
- Succeeded by: Council abolished

Personal details
- Party: Democratic Unionist Party

Gareth Wilson is a Democratic Unionist Party (DUP) politician who has been a Member of the Northern Ireland Assembly (MLA) for Newry and Armagh since January 2026.

== Political career ==
Wilson was first elected onto Armagh District Council at the 2005 election, which saw the Democratic Unionist Party (DUP) take three seats in the Cusher DEA. He retained his seat at the 2011 local elections.

Following the reorganisation of local government in preparation for the 2014 local elections, Wilson was returned to represent Cusher on the newly merged Armagh City, Banbridge and Craigavon District Council. He was re-elected at the 2019 and 2023 Council elections.

At the 2024 general election, Wilson ran as the DUP's candidate in Newry and Armagh, taking third place with 12.8% of the vote.

=== Member of the Northern Ireland Assembly ===
In December 2025, it was announced that Wilson will be co-opted to the Northern Ireland Assembly, succeeding long-serving Newry and Armagh member William Irwin. He took his seat on 5 January 2026.
