= Newry and Armagh (Assembly constituency) =

Constituency of the Northern Ireland Assembly

Coordinates: 54.211°N 6.499°W

- Northern Ireland Assembly; Parliamentary constituency
- Newry and Armagh shown within Northern Ireland

Current constituency
- Created: 1996
- Seats: 6 (1996–2016); 5 (2017–)
- MLAs: Cathal Boylan (SF); Aoife Finnegan (SF); Gareth Wilson (DUP); Liz Kimmins (SF); Justin McNulty (SDLP)
- Districts: Newry, Mourne and Down District Council

Newry and Armagh is a constituency in the Northern Ireland Assembly.

The seat was first used for a Northern Ireland-only election for the Northern Ireland Forum in 1996. Since 1998, it has elected members to the current Assembly.

For Assembly elections prior to 1996, the constituency was part of the Armagh and South Down constituencies. Since 1997, it has shared boundaries with the Newry and Armagh UK Parliament constituency.

For further details of the history and boundaries of the constituency, see Newry and Armagh (UK Parliament constituency).

== Members ==
Election	MLA (party)	MLA (party)	MLA (party)	MLA (party)	MLA (party)	MLA (party)
1996	Maria Caraher (Sinn Féin)	Patrick McNamee (Sinn Féin)	Frank Feely (SDLP)	Seamus Mallon (SDLP)	Jim Speers (UUP)	5 seats 1996–1998
1998	Conor Murphy (Sinn Féin)	Patrick McNamee (Sinn Féin)	John Fee (SDLP)	Seamus Mallon (SDLP)	Paul Berry (DUP)	Danny Kennedy (UUP)
2003	Conor Murphy (Sinn Féin)	Davy Hyland (Sinn Féin)	Pat O'Rawe (Sinn Féin)	Dominic Bradley (SDLP)	Paul Berry (DUP)	Danny Kennedy (UUP)
2007	Conor Murphy (Sinn Féin)	Cathal Boylan (Sinn Féin)	Mickey Brady (Sinn Féin)	Dominic Bradley (SDLP)	William Irwin (DUP)	Danny Kennedy (UUP)
2011	Conor Murphy (Sinn Féin)	Cathal Boylan (Sinn Féin)	Mickey Brady (Sinn Féin)	Dominic Bradley (SDLP)	William Irwin (DUP)	Danny Kennedy (UUP)
July 2012 co-option	Megan Fearon (Sinn Féin)	Cathal Boylan (Sinn Féin)	Mickey Brady (Sinn Féin)	Dominic Bradley (SDLP)	William Irwin (DUP)	Danny Kennedy (UUP)
June 2015 co-option	Megan Fearon (Sinn Féin)	Cathal Boylan (Sinn Féin)	Conor Murphy (Sinn Féin)	Dominic Bradley (SDLP)	William Irwin (DUP)	Danny Kennedy (UUP)
2016	Megan Fearon (Sinn Féin)	Cathal Boylan (Sinn Féin)	Conor Murphy (Sinn Féin)	Justin McNulty (SDLP)	William Irwin (DUP)	Danny Kennedy (UUP)
2017	Megan Fearon (Sinn Féin)	Cathal Boylan (Sinn Féin)	Conor Murphy (Sinn Féin)	Justin McNulty (SDLP)	William Irwin (DUP)	5 seats 2017–present
January 2020 co-option	Liz Kimmins (Sinn Féin)	Cathal Boylan (Sinn Féin)	Conor Murphy (Sinn Féin)	Justin McNulty (SDLP)	William Irwin (DUP)	5 seats 2017–present
2022	Liz Kimmins (Sinn Féin)	Cathal Boylan (Sinn Féin)	Conor Murphy (Sinn Féin)	Justin McNulty (SDLP)	William Irwin (DUP)	5 seats 2017–present
February 2025 co-option	Liz Kimmins (Sinn Féin)	Cathal Boylan (Sinn Féin)	Aoife Finnegan (Sinn Féin)	Justin McNulty (SDLP)	William Irwin (DUP)	5 seats 2017–present
January 2026 co-option	Liz Kimmins (Sinn Féin)	Cathal Boylan (Sinn Féin)	Aoife Finnegan (Sinn Féin)	Justin McNulty (SDLP)	Gareth Wilson (DUP)	5 seats 2017–present

Note: The columns in this table are used only for presentational purposes, and no significance should be attached to the order of columns. For details of the order in which seats were won at each election, see the detailed results of that election.

== Elections ==
=== Northern Ireland Assembly ===
==== 2027 ====
2027 Assembly election: Newry and Armagh – 5 seats
Party	Candidate	FPv%	Count
Party	Candidate	FPv%	1
Sinn Féin	Cathal Boylan		
SDLP	Pete Byrne		
Sinn Féin	Aoife Finnegan		
Sinn Féin	Liz Kimmins		
Aontú	Roisin Mulgrew		
UUP	Sam Nicholson		
TUV	Keith Ratcliffe		

==== 2022 ====
2022 Assembly election: Newry and Armagh – 5 seats
Party	Candidate	FPv%	Count				
Party	Candidate	FPv%	1	2	3	4	5
Sinn Féin	**Conor Murphy**	16.72%	**9,847**				
Sinn Féin	**Cathal Boylan**	16.72%	**9,843**				
SDLP	**Justin McNulty**	10.56%	6,217	6,585	7,483	7,686	**10,231**
Sinn Féin	**Liz Kimmins**	13.52%	7,964	8,192	9,464	9,472	**9,969**
DUP	**William Irwin**	12.87%	7,577	7,668	7,720	9,414	**9,784**
TUV	Keith Ratcliffe	9.18%	5,407	5,436	5,461	6,706	6,892
Alliance	Jackie Coade	5.68%	3,345	3,637	4,088	4,741	
UUP	David Taylor	6.56%	3,864	3,895	3,956		
Independent	Gavin Malone	5.36%	3,157	3,380			
Aontú	Daniel Connolly	2.02%	1,189				
Green (NI)	Ciara Henry	0.53%	314				
Workers' Party	Nicola Grant	0.27%	160				
Electorate: 87,156 Valid: 58,884 (67.56%) Spoilt: 809 Quota: 9,815 Turnout: 59,693 (68.49%)

==== 2017 ====
2017 Assembly election: Newry and Armagh – 5 seats
Party	Candidate	FPv%	Count		
Party	Candidate	FPv%	1	2	3
DUP	**William Irwin**	17.77%	**9,760**		
Sinn Féin	**Cathal Boylan**	16.75%	**9,197**		
SDLP	**Justin McNulty**	16.36%	8,983	**10,085**	
Sinn Féin	**Megan Fearon**	16.17%	8,881	**9,175**	
Sinn Féin	**Conor Murphy**	15.39%	8,454	8,681	**9,018**
UUP	Danny Kennedy	13.21%	7,256	7,675	7,939
Alliance	Jackie Coade	2.58%	1,418		
CISTA	Emmet Crossan	1.28%	704		
Green (NI)	Rowan Tunnicliffe	0.48%	265		
Electorate: 80,140 Valid: 54,918 (68.53%) Spoilt: 707 Quota: 9,154 Turnout: 55,625 (69.41%)

==== 2016 ====
2016 Assembly election: Newry and Armagh – 6 seats
Party	Candidate	FPv%	Count								
Party	Candidate	FPv%	1	2	3	4	5	6	7	8	9
DUP	**William Irwin**	16.72%	**7,980**								
Sinn Féin	**Megan Fearon**	14.33%	**6,838**								
Sinn Féin	**Cathal Boylan**	14.30%	**6,822**								
UUP	**Danny Kennedy**	10.28%	4,904	5,602.25	5,602.25	5,616.7	5,804.4	5,817.4	5,905.05	**9,595.3**	
Sinn Féin	**Conor Murphy**	12.27%	5,854	5,855.05	5,855.05	5,883.05	5,922.05	6,125.05	6,421.35	6,435.35	**6,442.35**
SDLP	**Justin McNulty**	10.01%	4,775	4,779.05	4,779.05	4,806.05	4,936.2	5,128.35	5,325.5	5,369.2	**5,701.2**
SDLP	Karen McKevitt	8.22%	3,923	3,929.45	3,929.45	3,963.6	4,086.2	4,356.35	4,515.65	4,564.2	5,042.2
UUP	Sam Nicholson	3.86%	1,841	2,045.75	2,045.75	2,049.2	2,159.85	2,166.85	2,220.45		
Independent	Paul Berry	3.49%	1,663	1,861.6	1,861.6	1,865.6	1,940.45	1,957.05	1,998.95		
CISTA	Emmet Crossan	2.16%	1,032	1,036.5	1,036.5	1,112.1	1,228.6	1,308.6			
Independent	Martin McAllister	1.97%	940	941.2	941.2	957.2	1,003.5				
Alliance	Craig Weir	1.03%	493	498.75	498.75	597.05					
UKIP	Alan Love	0.66%	315	346.05	346.05	349.2					
Green (NI)	Michael Watters	0.70%	335	337.4	337.4						
Electorate: 81,756 Valid: 47,715 (58.36%) Spoilt: 783 Quota: 6,817 Turnout: 48,498 (59.32%)

==== 2011 ====
2011 Assembly election: Newry and Armagh – 6 seats
Party	Candidate	FPv%	Count					
Party	Candidate	FPv%	1	2	3	4	5	6
Sinn Féin	**Conor Murphy**	19.62%	**9,127**					
UUP	**Danny Kennedy**	18.74%	**8,718**					
SDLP	**Dominic Bradley**	15.31%	**7,123**					
Sinn Féin	**Cathal Boylan**	14.22%	6,614	**8,092.40**				
DUP	**William Irwin**	13.12%	6,101	6,105.48	**7,502.46**			
Sinn Féin	**Mickey Brady**	7.00%	3,254	4,049.48	4,058.58	5,376.54	5,615.30	**5,624.92**
SDLP	Thomas O'Hanlon	8.22%	3,825	3,934.48	4,011.70	4,063.50	4,640.70	5,014.06
TUV	Barrie Halliday	1.78%	830	831.40	1,238.30	1,239.70		
Alliance	David Murphy	1.58%	734	748.28	838.76	840.44		
UKIP	Robert Woods	0.21%	98	99.40	125.66	126.22		
Independent	James Malone	0.19%	90	93.92	99.12	99.68		
Electorate: 77,544 Valid: 46,514 (59.98%) Spoilt: 1,048 Quota: 6,645 Turnout: 47,562 (61.34%)

==== 2007 ====
2007 Assembly election: Newry and Armagh – 6 seats
Party	Candidate	FPv%	Count						
Party	Candidate	FPv%	1	2	3	4	5	6	7
Sinn Féin	**Conor Murphy**	14.99%	**7,437**						
Sinn Féin	**Cathal Boylan**	14.32%	**7,105**						
Sinn Féin	**Mickey Brady**	12.77%	6,337	6,455	6,705.92	**7,513.92**			
DUP	**William Irwin**	12.93%	6,418	6,672	6,672.12	6,674.12	**8,008.12**		
UUP	**Danny Kennedy**	13.13%	6,517	6,813	6,813.28	6,833.36	**7,653.36**		
SDLP	**Dominic Bradley**	10.72%	5,318	5,530	5,551.64	5,974.48	6,025.6	6,169.6	**6,310.6**
SDLP	Sharon Haughey	9.07%	4,500	4,709	4,722.32	5,001.48	5,068.48	5,229.48	5,368.48
Independent	Paul Berry	4.67%	2,317	2,512	2,512.44	2,526.48			
Independent	Davy Hyland	4.41%	2,188	2,260	2,267.76				
Independent	Willie Frazer	1.22%	605						
Green (NI)	Brendan Morgan	1.21%	599						
Alliance	Máire Hendron	0.56%	278						
Electorate: 70,823 Valid: 49,619 (70.06%) Spoilt: 546 Quota: 7,089 Turnout: 50,165 (70.83%)

==== 2003 ====
2003 Assembly election: Newry and Armagh – 6 seats
Party	Candidate	FPv%	Count				
Party	Candidate	FPv%	1	2	3	4	5
DUP	**Paul Berry**	17.15%	**8,125**				
Sinn Féin	**Conor Murphy**	16.04%	**7,595**				
UUP	**Danny Kennedy**	15.51%	**7,347**				
SDLP	**Dominic Bradley**	8.68%	4,111	4,119.8	4,135	4,400.14	**6,783.14**
Sinn Féin	**Davy Hyland**	12.20%	5,779	5,779.48	6,347.38	6,367	**6,633.9**
Sinn Féin	**Pat O'Rawe**	11.56%	5,478	5,478.16	5,590.66	5,603.32	**5,712**
SDLP	Jim Lennon	8.69%	4,116	4,118.88	4,125.98	4,390.98	5,112.5
SDLP	John Fee	7.20%	3,410	3,411.28	3,459.38	3,656.96	
DUP	Freda Donnelly	1.00%	474	1,638.64	1,638.94		
Independent	Willie Frazer	1.33%	632	743	744		
Alliance	Pete Whitcroft	0.66%	311	314	315		
Electorate: 68,731 Valid: 47,378 (68.93%) Spoilt: 855 Quota: 6,769 Turnout: 48,233 (70.18%)

==== 1998 ====
1998 Assembly election: Newry and Armagh – 6 seats
Party	Candidate	FPv%	Count							
Party	Candidate	FPv%	1	2	3	4	5	6	7	8
SDLP	**Seamus Mallon**	25.09%	**13,582**							
DUP	**Paul Berry**	13.33%	7,214	7,217.44	7,231.87	**7,899.87**				
UUP	**Danny Kennedy**	10.15%	5,495	5,522.52	5,692.11	5,979.84	6,090	**10,184**		
Sinn Féin	**Conor Murphy**	8.94%	4,839	5,017.45	5,026.46	5,294.25	5,294.25	5,305.54	5,311.54	**7,741.25**
Sinn Féin	**Patrick McNamee**	8.44%	4,570	5,078.26	5,087.41	5,320.81	5,320.81	5,332.53	5,334.53	**7,176.79**
SDLP	**John Fee**	5.85%	3,166	5,419.63	5,485.67	6,429.02	6,430.38	6,514.11	6,949.11	**7,169.01**
SDLP	Frank Feely	4.07%	2,205	4,238.47	4,317.4	4,852.86	4,853.54	4,957.65	5,492.65	5,874.55
Sinn Féin	Davy Hyland	8.58%	4,643	4,879.5	4,888.08	5,261.06	5,261.74	5,270.37	5,284.37	
UUP	Jim Speers	7.99%	4,324	4,353.24	4,558.26	4,747.56	4,799.24			
NI Women's Coalition	Kate Fearon	2.10%	1,138	1,391.7	1,635.5					
Independent	Mary Allen	2.27%	1,227	1,357.29	1,398.45					
Ulster Independence	Willie Frazer	1.72%	933	935.58	947.58					
Alliance	Peter Whitcroft	1.44%	777	860.85						
Natural Law	David Evans	0.04%	23	25.15						
Electorate: 71,553 Valid: 54,136 (75.66%) Spoilt: 1,157 Quota: 7,735 Turnout: 55,293 (77.28%)

=== 1996 forum ===
Successful candidates are shown in bold.

Party	Candidate(s)	Votes	Percentage
SDLP	**Seamus Mallon**; **Frank Feely**; Pat Brannigan; Mary McLeown; John Fee	16,775	34.1
Sinn Féin	**Patrick McNamee**; **Maria Caraher**; Noel Sheridan; Brendan Curran; Caoimhghín Ó Caoláin	12,585	25.6
UUP	**Jim Speers**; Danny Kennedy; Elaine McClure; Sylvia McRoberts	11,047	22.5
DUP	Meredith Patterson; Margaret Black; John McKew	4,774	9.8
Alliance	Pete Whitcroft; Anne-Marie Cunningham	1,037	2.1
PUP	David Jamison; Raymond Laverty	640	1.4
UK Unionist	Robert St-Cyr; Margaret Thomson	474	0.9
NI Women's Coalition	Sheila Fairon; Lynd Roper; Kathleen Magee	356	0.7
Labour coalition	Eimear Duffy; Marian McKeown; Eamon Duffy; Eoin McGuinness	262	0.5
Ulster Democratic	William Garrett; Alan Hewitt	257	0.5
Workers' Party	Dennis Carroll; Vivian Hutchinson; Mary Campbell; James McConville; Pat Smith	208	0.4
Green (NI)	Vincent MacDowell; Tara Foley	205	0.4
Ulster Independence	Willie Frazer; John Gray	173	0.3
NI Conservatives	Sarah Humphreys; Jennifer Cumming	131	0.3
Democratic Partnership	Ronald Dawson; Donal Kelly	114	0.2
Independent DUP	Nigel Cummings; John Whitten	55	0.1
Democratic Left	Brendan Montague; Orla McClean	46	0.1
Natural Law	Eileen Leahy; Miguel Martin-Ramos	31	0.1
Independent Chambers	Stella Irvine; Sharon Ralston	12	0.0
