= Jim Speers =

Northern Irish politician

Member of Armagh City, Banbridge and Craigavon Borough Council
- In office 22 May 2014 – 18 May 2023
- Preceded by: Council created
- Succeeded by: Keith Ratcliffe
- Constituency: Cusher

Member of Armagh City and District Council
- In office 15 May 1985 – 22 May 2014
- Preceded by: District created
- Succeeded by: Council abolished
- Constituency: The Orchard
- In office 18 May 1977 – 20 May 1981
- Preceded by: Nelson Huddleston
- Succeeded by: District abolished
- Constituency: Armagh Area B

Member of the Northern Ireland Forum for Newry and Armagh
- In office 30 May 1996 – 25 April 1998
- Preceded by: Forum established
- Succeeded by: Forum dissolved

Member of the Northern Ireland Assembly for Armagh
- In office 1983–1986
- Preceded by: Seamus Mallon
- Succeeded by: Assembly dissolved

Personal details
- Born: 20 May 1946 (age 80) County Armagh, Northern Ireland
- Party: Ulster Unionist Party

James Alexander Speers MBE (born 20 May 1946), known as Jim Speers, is a Northern Irish farmer and former Ulster Unionist Party (UUP) politician, active in County Armagh.

== Career ==
Speers works as a businessman and part-time farmer. He was elected to Armagh City and District Council in 1977 for the Ulster Unionist Party.

He was an unsuccessful candidate at the 1982 Northern Ireland Assembly election, but was elected to the Assembly the following year in a by-election caused by the disqualification of Seamus Mallon, a Social Democratic and Labour Party (SDLP) member of the 1982 Northern Ireland Assembly, who had been a member of Seanad Éireann at the time of his election. The SDLP called on voters to boycott the election, which Speers contested as the UUP candidate. He easily beat the only other candidate, Tom French of the Workers' Party, and served on the Assembly until it was abolished in 1986.

Speers contested Newry and Armagh at the 1992 United Kingdom general election, and took second place, with 36% of the vote. In 1996, he was elected to the Northern Ireland Forum, as a UUP representative for Newry and Armagh. However, he failed to take a seat at the 1998 Northern Ireland Assembly election.

Speers later served on the Northern Ireland Tourist Board, and as of 2007 is the Chairperson of the UUP's Newry & Armagh Constituency Association, while continuing to sit on Armagh Council.

Northern Ireland Assembly (1982)
Preceded by Seamus Mallon	MPA for Armagh; 1983–1986	Assembly abolished
Northern Ireland Forum
New forum	Member for Newry and Armagh; 1996–1998	Forum dissolved
Civic offices
Preceded by Jim Nicholson	Mayor of Armagh; 1996–1997	Succeeded by Pat Brannigan
Preceded by Thomas O'Hanlon	Mayor of Armagh; 2010–2011	Succeeded by Freda Donnelly
