= Armagh City and District Council =

Former local council in Northern Ireland

Coordinates: 54.348°N 6.656°W

Armagh City and District
- Area: 671 km^{2} (259 sq mi); Ranked 6th of 26
- District HQ: Armagh
- Catholic: 48.4%
- Protestant: 48%
- Country: Northern Ireland
- Sovereign state: United Kingdom
- Councillors: MLAs Newry & Armagh Sinn Féin: 3 DUP: 1 SDLP: 1; MPs Conor Murphy (Sinn Féin)
- Website: www.armagh.gov.uk

Armagh City and District Council was a district council in County Armagh in Northern Ireland. It merged with Banbridge District Council and Craigavon Borough Council in May 2015 under local government reorganisation in Northern Ireland to become Armagh City, Banbridge and Craigavon Borough Council.

The Council area included the city of Armagh, as well as the surrounding area. City status was officially conferred in 1995. Armagh has a long reputation as an administrative centre and the headquarters of the Southern Education and Library Board and the Southern Health and Social Services Board were located in the city. The Armagh Outreach Centre was established in 1995 and is linked to the Queen's University of Belfast. The heads of both the Roman Catholic Church in Ireland and the Church of Ireland reside in the city.

The district consisted of four electoral areas: Armagh City, Cusher, Crossmore and The Orchard, from which 22 councillors were elected for a period of four years by proportional representation. At the last election in 2011 members were elected from the following political parties: 6 Ulster Unionist Party (UUP), 6 Sinn Féin, 5 Social Democratic and Labour Party (SDLP), 4 Democratic Unionist Party (DUP), and independent Councillor Paul Berry, a former DUP councillor. The last mayor of Armagh was Councillor Freda Donnelly (DUP). The last election was due to take place in May 2009, but, on 25 April 2008, Shaun Woodward, Secretary of State for Northern Ireland announced that the scheduled 2009 district council elections were to be postponed until the introduction of the eleven new councils in 2011.

The proposed reforms were postponed in 2010, and the most recent district council elections took place in 2011. Together with part of the district of Newry and Mourne, it formed the Newry & Armagh constituency for elections to the Westminster Parliament and Northern Ireland Assembly.

== Lord Mayor ==
Map of the district's DEAs from 1993 to 2014

A Lord Mayoralty was granted by Letters Patent to Armagh City and District on the occasion of the Diamond Jubilee of Elizabeth II in 2012. Since then the position has been that of Lord Mayor of Armagh City and District Council. Between 1995 and 2012 the position was Mayor of Armagh City and District Council.

== Mayors of Armagh ==
1995 – 96: Jim Nicholson, Ulster Unionist Party
1996 – 97: Jim Speers, Ulster Unionist Party
1997 – 98: Pat Brannigan, Social Democratic and Labour Party
1998 – 99: Robert Turner, Ulster Unionist Party
1999 – 00: Tom Canavan, Social Democratic and Labour Party
2000 – 01: Jimmy Clayton, Ulster Unionist Party
2001 – 02: Sylvia McRoberts, Ulster Unionist Party
2002 – 03: Anna Brolly, Social Democratic and Labour Party
2003 – 04: Pat O'Rawe, Sinn Féin
2004 – 05: Eric Speers, Ulster Unionist Party
2005 – 06: John Campbell, Social Democratic and Labour Party
2006 – 07: William Irwin, Democratic Unionist Party
2007 – 08: Charles Rollston, Ulster Unionist Party
2008 – 09: Noel Sheridan, Sinn Féin
2009 – 10: Thomas O'Hanlon, Social Democratic and Labour Party
2010 – 11: Jim Speers, Ulster Unionist Party
2011 – 12: Freda Donnelly, Democratic Unionist Party

== Lord Mayors of Armagh ==
2012 – 13: Sharon Haughey, Social Democratic and Labour Party
2013 – 14: Robert Turner, Ulster Unionist Party
2014 – 15: Cathy Rafferty, Sinn Féin

== Lord Mayors of Armagh City, Banbridge and Craigavon Borough ==
- See Armagh City, Banbridge and Craigavon Borough Council

== Population ==
The area covered by Armagh City and District Council had a population of 59,340 residents according to the 2011 Northern Ireland census.

== See also ==
- Local government in Northern Ireland
