= 2005 United Kingdom local elections =

- 5 May 2005

All 34 non-metropolitan counties, 3 out of 46 unitary authorities, 1 sui generis authority, 4 directly elected mayors and all 26 Northern Irish districts
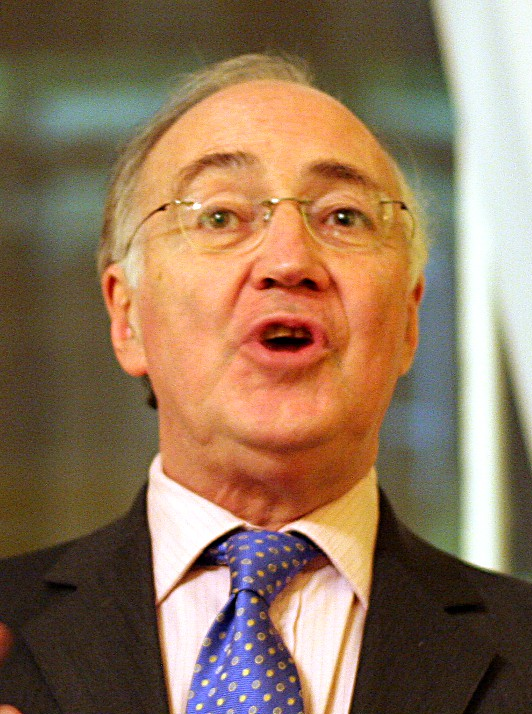

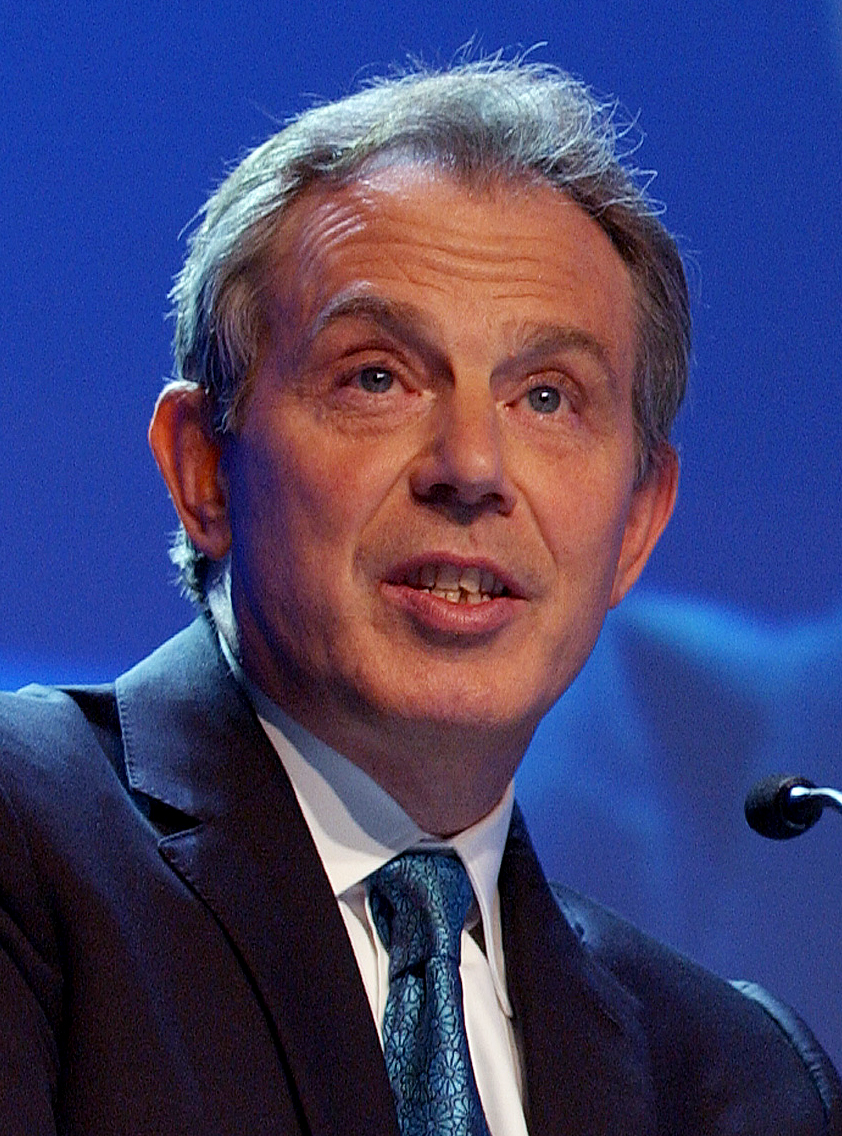

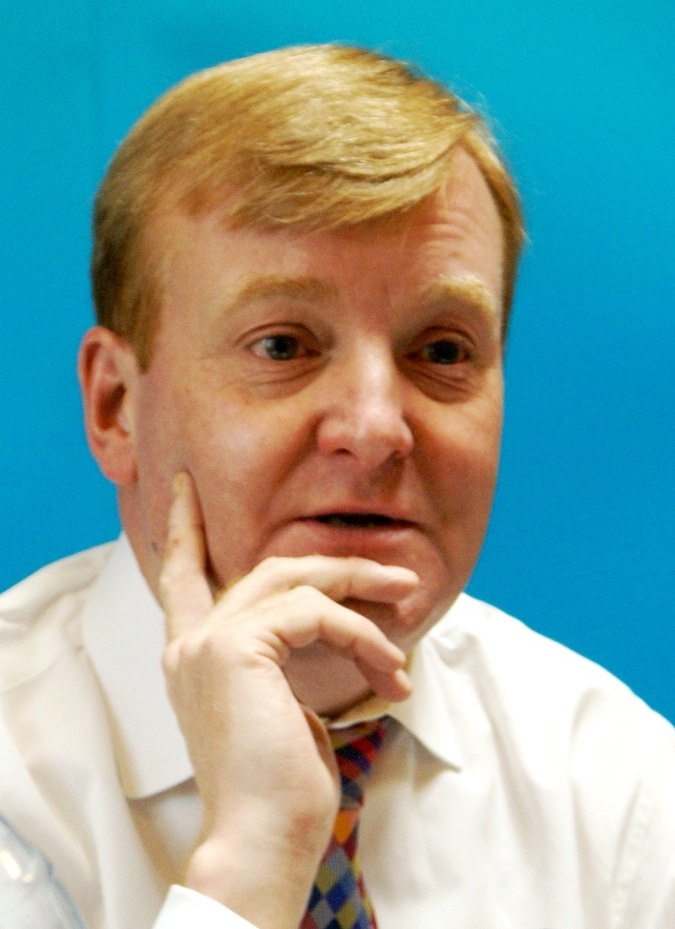
	Majority party	Minority party	Third party
Leader	Michael Howard	Tony Blair	Charles Kennedy
Party	Conservative	Labour	Liberal Democrats
Leader since	6 November 2003	21 July 1994	9 August 1999
Percentage	40%	28%	25%
Swing	▲3%	▼2%	▲4%
Councils	24	6	3
Councils +/-	▲7	▼1	▲3
Councillors	1,193	612	493
Councillors +/-	▲152	▼114	▲40
- Colours denote the winning party, as shown in the main table of results.

The 2005 United Kingdom local elections were held on Thursday 5 May 2005, with various councils and local government seats being contested in England and Northern Ireland, and a local referendum taking place on the Isle of Wight on the issue of a directly elected mayor. These local elections were held in conjunction with the 2005 general election across the entire United Kingdom.

Despite losing the general election held on the same day, the Conservatives made some gains at Labour's expense, providing some comfort to the party. Conservative leader Michael Howard resigned soon afterwards and was succeeded by David Cameron, who had a decent platform to build on in his challenge to lead the Conservatives to a general election victory; the party had increased its share of council seats and importantly its share of seats in parliament.

== Summary of results ==
Party	Councillors		Councils	
Party	Number	Change	Number	Change
Conservative	1,193	▲152	24	▲7
Labour	612	▼114	6	▼1
Liberal Democrats	493	▲40	3	▲3
DUP	182	▲51	2	▲2
Sinn Féin	126	▲18	0	Steady
UUP	115	▼39	0	Steady
SDLP	101	▼16	0	Steady
Alliance	30	▲2	0	Steady
Independent	20	▼14	0	Steady
Green	8	▲6	0	Steady
Residents	8	▼3	0	Steady
Green (NI)	3	▲3	0	Steady
Liberal	2	▼3	0	Steady
PUP	2	▼2	0	Steady
United Unionist	2	Steady	0	Steady
Health Concern	1	▼5	0	Steady
Newtownabbey; Ratepayers	1	Steady	0	Steady
NI Women's Coalition	0	▼1	0	Steady
UKIP	0	▼1	0	Steady
UK Unionist	0	▼2	0	Steady
Other	96	▼26	0	Steady
No overall control	n/a	n/a	4	▼9

Like in 2001, many results were in line with the general election on the same day.

The Liberal Democrats gained Cornwall, whilst simultaneously winning Camborne & Falmouth from Labour, and thus holding every parliamentary seat in Cornwall. Similarly in Somerset too, where they regained Taunton from the Conservatives.

The Conservative gain in Gloucestershire coincided with their gain of Forest of Dean from Labour, the swing towards them in Cheltenham where the previous Lib Dem MP had retired and their near-miss result where Labour narrowly held on to Stroud. Worcestershire's result coincided with reduced Labour majorities in Worcester and Redditch, whilst overtaking Labour for second place in Wyre Forest. The Isle of Wight was also in line with the general election, which saw a huge increase in the Conservative majority on the island.

Northamptonshire coincided with Labour's losses in Kettering, Wellingborough and Northampton South, all of which were extremely marginal seats that the Conservatives narrowly lost in 1997 and where they failed to make any progress in 2001. Shropshire similarly coincided with 3 gains in the general elections for the Conservatives, where they took The Wrekin and Shrewsbury & Atcham from Labour and took Ludlow from the Liberal Democrats. Suffolk coincided with no actual seat gains in the general election, but swings to the Conservatives of at least 3% in all seven constituencies. The swings were larger in their own five constituencies, with a swing of almost 7% in Bury St Edmunds.

The Liberal Democrat gain in Devon, however, happened despite a mixed bag of results in the general election. They lost Devon West & Torridge to the Conservatives, and in Torbay, the Conservatives reduced their majority. There were small swings to the Lib Dems in Totnes, Teignbridge and Devon North, though a big swing away from them in Tiverton and Honiton.

== England ==
=== Non-metropolitan county councils ===
In 34 shire county county councils, all seats were up for re-election.

Council	Previous control	Result	Details
Bedfordshire ‡	Conservative	Conservative hold	Details
Buckinghamshire ‡	Conservative	Conservative hold	Details
Cambridgeshire ‡	Conservative	Conservative hold	Details
Cheshire	Conservative	Conservative hold	Details
Cornwall ‡	No overall control	Liberal Democrats gain	Details
Cumbria	No overall control	No overall control hold	Details
Derbyshire ‡	Labour	Labour hold	Details
Devon ‡	No overall control	Liberal Democrats gain	Details
Dorset ‡	Conservative	Conservative hold	Details
Durham ‡	Labour	Labour hold	Details
East Sussex ‡	Conservative	Conservative hold	Details
Essex ‡	Conservative	Conservative hold	Details
Gloucestershire ‡	No overall control	Conservative gain	Details
Hampshire ‡	Conservative	Conservative hold	Details
Hertfordshire	Conservative	Conservative hold	Details
Kent ‡	Conservative	Conservative hold	Details
Lancashire ‡	Labour	Labour hold	Details
Leicestershire ‡	Conservative	Conservative hold	Details
Lincolnshire	Conservative	Conservative hold	Details
Norfolk ‡	Conservative	Conservative hold	Details
North Yorkshire ‡	Conservative	Conservative hold	Details
Northamptonshire	Labour	Conservative gain	Details
Northumberland	Labour	Labour hold	Details
Nottinghamshire ‡	Labour	Labour hold	Details
Oxfordshire ‡	No overall control	Conservative gain	Details
Shropshire ‡	No overall control	Conservative gain	Details
Somerset	No overall control	Liberal Democrats gain	Details
Staffordshire ‡	Labour	Labour hold	Details
Suffolk ‡	No overall control	Conservative gain	Details
Surrey ‡	Conservative	Conservative hold	Details
Warwickshire ‡	No overall control	No overall control hold	Details
West Sussex ‡	Conservative	Conservative hold	Details
Wiltshire ‡	Conservative	Conservative hold	Details
Worcestershire ‡	No overall control	Conservative gain	Details

‡ New electoral division boundaries

=== Unitary authorities ===
==== Whole council ====
In two unitary authorities the whole council were up for election and one had a third of the council up for election.

Council	Previous control	Result	Details
Isle of Wight	No overall control	Conservative gain	Details
Stockton-on-Tees ‡	Labour	No overall control gain	Details

‡ New ward boundaries

==== Third of council ====
Council	Previous control	Result	Details
Bristol	No overall control	No overall control hold	Details

=== Sui generis ===
Council	Previous control	Result	Details
Isles of Scilly	Independent	Independent hold	Details

=== Mayoral elections ===
Four direct mayoral elections were held.

Local Authority	Previous Mayor	Mayor-elect	Details
Doncaster	Martin Winter (Labour)	Martin Winter (Labour)	
Hartlepool	Stuart Drummond (Independent)	Stuart Drummond (Independent)	
North Tyneside	Linda Arkley (Conservative)	John Harrison (Labour)	Details
Stoke-on-Trent	Mike Wolfe (Independent)	Mark Meredith (Labour)	

== Northern Ireland ==
All seats were up for election in the 26 districts of Northern Ireland. The many parties and the use of the single transferable vote meant that most councils ended up in no overall control. The DUP gained majority control of three councils: Ards, Ballymena, and Castlereagh.

=== Results summary ===
Party	Councillors		Votes	
Party	Change	Total	% share	Total
DUP	+51	182	30	208,278
Sinn Féin	+18	126	23	163,205
UUP	-39	115	18	126,317
SDLP	-16	101	17	121,991
Alliance	+2	30	5	35,149
Independent	-14	20	4	27,677
Green (NI)	+3	3	1	5,703
PUP	-2	2	1	4,591
United Unionist	0	2	0.3	2,064
Newtownabbey Ratepayers	0	1	0.3	1,897
Socialist Environmental	0	0	0.2	1,321
NI Conservatives	0	0	0.2	1,164
Workers' Party	0	0	0.1	1,052
Socialist Party	0	0	0.1	828
NI Women's Coalition	-1	0	0.1	738
UK Unionist	-2	0	0.1	734

=== Council Control ===
Council	Previous control	Result	Details
Antrim	No overall control	No overall control	Details
Ards	No overall control	DUP	Details
Armagh	No overall control	No overall control	Details
Ballymena	No overall control	DUP	Details
Ballymoney	DUP	DUP	Details
Banbridge	No overall control	No overall control	Details
Belfast	No overall control	No overall control	Details
Carrickfergus	No overall control	No overall control	Details
Castlereagh	No overall control	DUP	Details
Coleraine	No overall control	No overall control	Details
Cookstown	No overall control	No overall control	Details
Craigavon	No overall control	No overall control	Details
Derry	No overall control	No overall control	Details
Down	No overall control	No overall control	Details
Dungannon and South Tyrone	No overall control	No overall control	Details
Fermanagh	No overall control	No overall control	Details
Larne	No overall control	No overall control	Details
Limavady	No overall control	No overall control	Details
Lisburn	No overall control	No overall control	Details
Magherafelt	No overall control	Sinn Féin	Details
Moyle	No overall control	No overall control	Details
Newry and Mourne	No overall control	No overall control	Details
Newtownabbey	No overall control	No overall control	Details
North Down	No overall control	No overall control	Details
Omagh	No overall control	No overall control	Details
Strabane	No overall control	Sinn Féin	Details

Source: ARK research and knowledge group
