= 2005 Oxfordshire County Council election =

UK local election

← 2001	5 May 2005	2009 →

All 74 seats to Oxfordshire County Council 38 seats needed for a majority
	Majority party	Minority party	Third party
Party	Conservative	Labour	Liberal Democrats
Last election	26	24	18
Seats won	43	9	17
Seat change	▲17	▼15	▼1
	Fourth party
Party	Green
Last election	2
Seats won	5
Seat change	▲3
- 2005 local election results in Oxfordshire
Party before election
Conservative
Elected Party
Conservative

The 2005 Oxfordshire County Council election took place on 5 May 2005 as part of the 2005 United Kingdom local elections, coinciding with the 2005 United Kingdom general election. 74 councillors were elected from various electoral divisions, which returned either one, two or three county councillors each by first-past-the-post voting for a four-year term of office. This was the first election using the new electoral divisions following proposals from the Electoral Commission in 2004, meaning the council would consist of three seats more than previously.

All locally registered electors (British, Irish, Commonwealth and European Union citizens) who were aged 18 or over on 5 May 2005 were entitled to vote in the local elections. Those who were temporarily away from their ordinary address (for example, away working, on holiday, in student accommodation or in hospital) were also entitled to vote in the local elections, although those who had moved abroad and registered as overseas electors cannot vote in the local elections. It is possible to register to vote at more than one address (such as a university student who had a term-time address and lives at home during holidays) at the discretion of the local Electoral Register Office, but it remains an offence to vote more than once in the same local government election.

== Summary ==
The election saw the Conservative Party increase their majority on Oxfordshire County Council by an extra 17 seats, with Labour slipping into third place behind the Liberal Democrats. The Liberal Democrats maintained most of their seats and the Green Party raised their seat total to five.

Owing to a national trend of decreasing Labour share after their 2001 landslide election, the re-drawing of boundary lines, as well as the high levels of wealth and older median age of residents in the county, the results were in line with expectations.

== Division results ==
Due to the redistribution of boundary lines, all seats have been classed as new seats. Incumbent councillors have, however, been marked with an asterisk.

Abingdon East
Party	Candidate	Votes	%	±%
Liberal Democrats	L. Legge*	2,136	45.8	N/A
Conservative	A. McLernan	1,407	30.2	N/A
Labour	R. Dacombe	748	16	N/A
Green	S. Burchill	372	8	N/A
Majority		729	15.6	N/A
Turnout		4,663	67.1	N/A
Liberal Democrats win (new seat)				

Abingdon North*
Party	Candidate	Votes	%	±%
Liberal Democrats	A. Bryden	2,057	41.5	N/A
Conservative	A. Lovatt	1,731	34.9	N/A
Labour	R. Eden	829	16.7	N/A
Green	T. Lines	339	6.8	N/A
Majority		326	6.6	N/A
Turnout		4,956	69.1	N/A
Liberal Democrats win (new seat)				

Abingdon West
Party	Candidate	Votes	%	±%
Conservative	C. Badcock	2,702	38.7	N/A
Conservative	M. Badcock	2,680		N/A
Liberal Democrats	N. Fawcett*	2,552	36.5	N/A
Liberal Democrats	A. Lawrence	2,494		N/A
Labour	L. Baxter	1,132	16.2	N/A
Labour	P. Morton	905		N/A
Green	N. Freestone	599	8.6	N/A
Green	D. Giacomin	507		N/A
Majority		150	2.2	N/A
Turnout		6,809	59.2	N/A
Conservative win (new seat)				
Conservative win (new seat)				

Bampton
Party	Candidate	Votes	%	±%
Conservative	D. Seale*	2,180	52.2	N/A
Liberal Democrats	F. Stanger	1,061	25.4	N/A
Labour	W. Tumbridge	679	16.3	N/A
Green	P. Creighton	255	6.1	N/A
Majority		1,119	26.8	N/A
Turnout		4,175	71.4	N/A
Conservative win (new seat)				

Banbury Easington
Party	Candidate	Votes	%	±%
Conservative	K. Mallon*	1,885	46.2	N/A
Labour	M. Weird	1,172	28.7	N/A
Liberal Democrats	H. Lord	805	19.7	N/A
Green	V. Houillon	219	5.4	N/A
Majority		713	17.5	N/A
Turnout		4,081	64.5	N/A
Conservative win (new seat)				

Banbury Grimsbury & Castle
Party	Candidate	Votes	%	±%
Conservative	R. Higham	1,323	37.1	N/A
Labour	S. Mold*	1,244	34.9	N/A
Liberal Democrats	A. Khalid	789	22.1	N/A
Green	T. Pizey	212	5.9	N/A
Majority		79	2.2	N/A
Turnout		3,568	51.6	N/A
Conservative win (new seat)				

Banbury Hardwick
Party	Candidate	Votes	%	±%
Conservative	N. Turner	1,533	41.5	N/A
Labour	R. Mold*	1,368	37	N/A
Liberal Democrats	A. Burns	665	18	N/A
Green	M. Sellwood	129	3.5	N/A
Majority		165	4.5	N/A
Turnout		3,695	56.2	N/A
Conservative win (new seat)				

Banbury Neithrop
Party	Candidate	Votes	%	±%
Labour	S. Dhesi	1,617	40.6	N/A
Conservative	C. Blackwell	1,540	38.7	N/A
Liberal Democrats	P. Bearder	600	15.1	N/A
Green	A. Fraser	225	5.7	N/A
Majority		77	1.9	N/A
Turnout		3,982	61.3	N/A
Labour win (new seat)				

Banbury Ruscote
Party	Candidate	Votes	%	±%
Labour	P. Cartledge	1,493	50.5	N/A
Conservative	K. Strangwood	927	31.4	N/A
Liberal Democrats	P. Cusack	418	14.1	N/A
Green	A. Fraser	118	4	N/A
Majority		566	19.1	N/A
Turnout		3,016	50.5	N/A
Labour win (new seat)				

Barton & Churchill
Party	Candidate	Votes	%	±%
Liberal Democrats	R. Smith	2,691	33.5	N/A
Labour	E. Brighouse*	2,511	31.3	N/A
Labour	M. McAndrews*	2,336		N/A
Liberal Democrats	M. Khan	1,995		N/A
Conservative	P. Dailey	1,510	18.8	N/A
Conservative	B. Barber	1,370		N/A
Green	R. Hitchins	844	10.5	N/A
Green	A. Williams	765		N/A
Independent	J. Craft	468	5.8	N/A
Majority		180	2.2	N/A
Turnout		7,282	53.2	N/A
Liberal Democrats win (new seat)				
Labour win (new seat)				

Benson
Party	Candidate	Votes	%	±%
Conservative	A. Crabbe*	1,731	43.5	N/A
Liberal Democrats	S. Cooper	1,622	40.8	N/A
Labour	M. Stephenson	404	10.2	N/A
Green	S. Miles	219	5.5	N/A
Majority		109	2.7	N/A
Turnout		3,973	66.8	N/A
Conservative win (new seat)				

Bicester
Party	Candidate	Votes	%	±%
Conservative	N. Bolster	5,165	41.7	N/A
Conservative	M. Waine	4,817		N/A
Conservative	L. Stratford	4,617		N/A
Labour	L. Sibley*	3,654	29.5	N/A
Labour	J. Hanna	3,014		N/A
Labour	J. Broad	2,882		N/A
Liberal Democrats	S. Creed	2,073	16.7	N/A
Liberal Democrats	B. Shakespeare	1,969		N/A
Green	J. Chipchase	887	7.2	N/A
Green	L. James	668		N/A
National Front	J. Starkey	601	4.9	N/A
Green	C. Williams	568		N/A
Majority		1,511	12.2	N/A
Turnout		10,421	55.1	N/A
Conservative win (new seat)				
Conservative win (new seat)				
Conservative win (new seat)				

Bicester South
Party	Candidate	Votes	%	±%
Conservative	C. Shouler*	2,091	53.3	N/A
Labour	C. Thompson	828	21.1	N/A
Liberal Democrats	A. Burns	802	20.4	N/A
Green	S. Cameron	203	5.2	N/A
Majority		1,263	32.2	N/A
Turnout		3,923	65	N/A
Conservative win (new seat)				

Bloxham
Party	Candidate	Votes	%	±%
Conservative	K. Mitchell*	2,669	54.3	N/A
Liberal Democrats	I. Thomas	1,234	25.1	N/A
Labour	R. Muir	720	14.7	N/A
Green	K. Hyams	290	5.9	N/A
Majority		1,435	29.2	N/A
Turnout		4,910	72	N/A
Conservative win (new seat)				

Burford & Carterton North
Party	Candidate	Votes	%	±%
Conservative	J. Couchman	1,905	53	N/A
Liberal Democrats	J. Tayler	729	20.3	N/A
Labour	R. Gibbons	683	19	N/A
Green	A. Edmonds	279	7.8	N/A
Majority		1,176	32.7	N/A
Turnout		3,598	63	N/A
Conservative win (new seat)				

Carterton South West
Party	Candidate	Votes	%	±%
Conservative	K. Stone	2,095	51.7	N/A
Liberal Democrats	P. Madden	1,103	27.2	N/A
Labour	M. Rowley	728	18	N/A
Green	P. Reiss	128	3.2	N/A
Majority		992	24.5	N/A
Turnout		4,055	62.3	N/A
Conservative win (new seat)				

Chalgrove
Party	Candidate	Votes	%	±%
Liberal Democrats	D. Turner*	2,111	50.5	N/A
Conservative	P. Pritchard	1,359	32.5	N/A
Labour	P. Collins	477	11.4	N/A
Green	S. Lane	237	5.7	N/A
Majority		752	18	N/A
Turnout		4,181	67.8	N/A
Liberal Democrats win (new seat)				

Charlbury
Party	Candidate	Votes	%	±%
Conservative	S. Haffenden	2,022	38.8	N/A
Labour	J. Hodgson*	1,760	33.8	N/A
Liberal Democrats	G. Cutting	1,136	21.8	N/A
Green	L. Patterson	287	5.5	N/A
Majority		262	5	N/A
Turnout		5,207	75.2	N/A
Conservative win (new seat)				

Chipping Norton
Party	Candidate	Votes	%	±%
Conservative	H. Hibbert-Biles	1,666	42	N/A
Labour	R. Evans*	1,428	36	N/A
Liberal Democrats	D. Brown	643	16.2	N/A
Green	B. Luney	233	5.9	N/A
Majority		238	6	N/A
Turnout		3,969	67.8	N/A
Conservative win (new seat)				

Cowley & Littlemore
Party	Candidate	Votes	%	±%
Labour	O. McIntosh-Stedman	2,983	41.4	N/A
Labour	J. Sanders	2,856		N/A
Liberal Democrats	C. Bones	1,838	25.5	N/A
Liberal Democrats	J. Wilde	1,513		N/A
Conservative	J. Harley	1,325	18.4	N/A
Conservative	E. Mills	1,274		N/A
Green	S. Brook	1,060	14.7	N/A
Green	M. Juckes	1,057		N/A
Majority		1,100	15.9	N/A
Turnout		7,005	54.7	N/A
Labour win (new seat)				
Labour win (new seat)				

Deddington
Party	Candidate	Votes	%	±%
Conservative	R. Jelf	2,616	54.6	N/A
Liberal Democrats	P. Davis	1,005	21	N/A
Labour	J. Darke	714	14.9	N/A
Green	L. Ford	460	9.6	N/A
Majority		1,611	33.6	N/A
Turnout		4,797	72.8	N/A
Conservative win (new seat)				

Didcot Ladygrove
Party	Candidate	Votes	%	±%
Conservative	W. Service	1,393	38.5	N/A
Liberal Democrats	C. Jennings	1,225	33.9	N/A
Labour	P. Thompson	850	23.5	N/A
Green	I. Harrison	150	4.1	N/A
Majority		168	4.6	N/A
Turnout		3,618	66.5	N/A
Conservative win (new seat)				

Didcot South
Party	Candidate	Votes	%	±%
Labour	T. Joslin*	2,996	40.7	N/A
Labour	N. Harris*	2,837		N/A
Conservative	T. Harbour	2,294	31.2	N/A
Conservative	A. Thompson	2,219		N/A
Liberal Democrats	A. Jones	1,653	22.5	N/A
Liberal Democrats	L. Hacker	1,318		N/A
Green	M. Ledbury	410	5.6	N/A
Green	P. Lingwood	308		N/A
Majority		702	9.5	N/A
Turnout		7,048	60.8	N/A
Labour win (new seat)				
Labour win (new seat)				

Dorchester & Berinsfield
Party	Candidate	Votes	%	±%
Conservative	J. Howell	2,060	50.2	N/A
Labour	M. Hall	906	22.1	N/A
Liberal Democrats	C. Heath-Whyte	807	19.6	N/A
Green	D. Scott	334	8.1	N/A
Majority		1,154	28.1	N/A
Turnout		4,105	66.0	N/A
Conservative win (new seat)				

East Oxford
Party	Candidate	Votes	%	±%
Green	C. Simmons*	2,623	35.7	N/A
Green	L. Sanders	2,361		N/A
Liberal Democrats	S-H. Malik	2,004	27.2	N/A
Liberal Democrats	M. Whittaker	1,988		N/A
Labour	M. Abbasi	1,851	25.2	N/A
Labour	B. Hudson*	1,826		N/A
Conservative	J. Young	877	11.9	N/A
Conservative	G. Shomroni	828		N/A
Majority		619	8.4	N/A
Turnout		7,226	54.6	N/A
Green win (new seat)				
Green win (new seat)				

Eynsham
Party	Candidate	Votes	%	±%
Liberal Democrats	H. Wyatt*	2,276	44.3	N/A
Conservative	J. Mills	1,807	35.1	N/A
Labour	D. Enright	701	13.6	N/A
Green	X. Bevis	359	7	N/A
Majority		469	9.1	N/A
Turnout		5,140	72.4	N/A
Liberal Democrats win (new seat)				

Faringdon
Party	Candidate	Votes	%	±%
Conservative	J. Heathcoat*	1,807	51.3	N/A
Labour	D. England	918	26	N/A
Liberal Democrats	J. Hanna	550	15.6	N/A
Green	D. O'Neal	249	7.1	N/A
Majority		889	25.2	N/A
Turnout		3,521	64.4	N/A
Conservative win (new seat)				

Goring
Party	Candidate	Votes	%	±%
Conservative	J. Farrow*	2,099	44	N/A
Liberal Democrats	R. Peirce	1,751	36.7	N/A
Green	J. Norman	531	11.1	N/A
Labour	J. Tanner	387	8.1	N/A
Majority		348	7.3	N/A
Turnout		4,770	73.9	N/A
Conservative win (new seat)				

Grove & Wantage
Party	Candidate	Votes	%	±%
Liberal Democrats	Z. Patrick*	3,414	35.6	N/A
Liberal Democrats	J. Moley*	3,317		N/A
Conservative	W. Melotti	3,152	32.9	N/A
Conservative	D. Phillips	3,148		N/A
Labour	J. Nunn-Price	2,270	23.7	N/A
Labour	W. Ackers	2,044		N/A
Green	K. Harris	742	7.7	N/A
Green	M. Oakenby	393		N/A
Majority		262	2.7	N/A
Turnout		9,257	68.2	N/A
Liberal Democrats win (new seat)				
Liberal Democrats win (new seat)				

Hanborough
Party	Candidate	Votes	%	±%
Conservative	L. Chapman	1,910	42.5	N/A
Liberal Democrats	D. James	1,846	41.1	N/A
Labour	R. Harris	520	11.6	N/A
Green	T. Dighton-Brown	213	4.7	N/A
Majority		64	1.4	N/A
Turnout		4,490	74.7	N/A
Conservative win (new seat)				

Hanneys & Hendreds
Party	Candidate	Votes	%	±%
Conservative	I. Brown	2,076	44.3	N/A
Liberal Democrats	P. Kent	1,663	35.5	N/A
Labour	S. Quinton	695	14.8	N/A
Green	L. Sherwood	250	5.3	N/A
Majority		414	8.8	N/A
Turnout		4,684	75	N/A
Conservative win (new seat)				

Headington & Marston
Party	Candidate	Votes	%	±%
Liberal Democrats	P. Bones	2,576	32.2	N/A
Liberal Democrats	M. Altaf-Khan	2,328		N/A
Labour	N. Bartleet	2,085	26.1	N/A
Conservative	M. Cox	1,891	23.6	N/A
Labour	K. Pounds	1,881		N/A
Conservative	M. Davis	1,566		N/A
Green	K. Wedell	1,008	12.6	N/A
Green	M. Dhanda	876		N/A
Independent	M. Haines	440	5	N/A
Independent	K. Tiwari	341		N/A
Majority		491	6.1	N/A
Turnout		7,547	59	N/A
Liberal Democrats win (new seat)				
Liberal Democrats win (new seat)				

Henley North & Chilterns
Party	Candidate	Votes	%	±%
Conservative	D. Nimmo-Smith	1,861	48	N/A
Henley Residents	K. Arlett	814	21	N/A
Liberal Democrats	J. Griffin	582	15	N/A
Labour	M. Fahey	362	9.3	N/A
Green	C. Dear	260	6.7	N/A
Majority		1,047	27	N/A
Turnout		3,882	63.8	N/A
Conservative win (new seat)				

Henley South
Party	Candidate	Votes	%	±%
Conservative	P. Skolar	1,839	46.3	N/A
Henley Residents	T. Buckett	1,081	27.2	N/A
Liberal Democrats	J. Allison	514	12.9	N/A
Green	S. Findlay	294	7.4	N/A
Labour	W. Atkinson	247	6.2	N/A
Majority		758	19.1	N/A
Turnout		3,977	66.9	N/A
Conservative win (new seat)				

Isis
Party	Candidate	Votes	%	±%
Green	D. Glass	3,155	37.9	N/A
Green	J. Sherwood	2,370		N/A
Liberal Democrats	S-H. Malik	2,085	25.0	N/A
Labour	E. Goodall	2,008	24.1	N/A
Liberal Democrats	A. Rosser	1,446		N/A
Labour	K. Harper	1,432		N/A
Conservative	S. Mort	1,080	13	N/A
Conservative	M. Barber	1,038		N/A
Majority		1,070	12.8	N/A
Turnout		7,336	58.1	N/A
Green win (new seat)				
Green win (new seat)				

Kennington & Radley
Party	Candidate	Votes	%	±%
Liberal Democrats	R. Johnston*	1,889	44.8	N/A
Conservative	J. Standen	1,567	37.2	N/A
Labour	E. Turner	460	10.9	N/A
Green	C. Henderson	299	7.1	N/A
Majority		322	7.6	N/A
Turnout		4,215	70.1	N/A
Liberal Democrats win (new seat)				

Kidlington & Yarnton
Party	Candidate	Votes	%	±%
Conservative	M. Billington	3,534	38.5	N/A
Conservative	M. Hastings	3,137		N/A
Liberal Democrats	D. Rae	2,885	31.4	N/A
Liberal Democrats	S. Wilson-Higgins	2,282		N/A
Labour	C. Arakelian	2,124	23.1	N/A
Labour	C. Robins*	1,993		N/A
Green	J. Warren	644	7	N/A
Green	J. Poster	411		N/A
Majority		649	7.1	N/A
Turnout		8,528	59.3	N/A
Conservative win (new seat)				
Conservative win (new seat)				

Kingston Bagpuize
Party	Candidate	Votes	%	±%
Conservative	M. Tilley	1,961	50.6	N/A
Liberal Democrats	E. Last	874	22.5	N/A
Labour	C. Gill	841	21.7	N/A
Green	L. Losito	203	5.2	N/A
Majority		1,087	28	N/A
Turnout		3,880	71.4	N/A
Conservative win (new seat)				

Leys & Lye
Party	Candidate	Votes	%	±%
Labour	V. Smith	3,134	48.7	N/A
Labour	B. Gatehouse*	2,536		N/A
Liberal Democrats	I. Bearder	1,070	16.6	N/A
Independent	S. Radbourne	970	15.1	N/A
Liberal Democrats	N. Pyle	933		N/A
Independent	D. Saunders	903		N/A
Conservative	W. Clare	790	12.3	N/A
Conservative	A. Mills	788		N/A
Green	S. Tibbles	467	7.3	N/A
Green	N. Young	346		N/A
Majority		2,064	32.1	N/A
Turnout		6,002	46.6	N/A
Labour win (new seat)				
Labour win (new seat)				

Moreton
Party	Candidate	Votes	%	±%
Conservative	P. Greene*	1,934	45.9	N/A
Liberal Democrats	M. Gray	1,355	32.1	N/A
Labour	N. Hards	665	15.8	N/A
Green	D. Caldwell	263	6.2	N/A
Majority		579	13.7	N/A
Turnout		4,219	72.3	N/A
Conservative win (new seat)				

North Hinksey & Wytham
Party	Candidate	Votes	%	±%
Liberal Democrats	J. Godden*	1,739	42.4	N/A
Conservative	A. Dykes	1,363	33.2	N/A
Labour	J. Salmon	541	13.2	N/A
Green	R. Cowley	461	11.2	N/A
Majority		376	9.2	N/A
Turnout		4,106	68.2	N/A
Liberal Democrats win (new seat)				

Otmoor & Kirtlington
Party	Candidate	Votes	%	±%
Conservative	T. Hallchurch	1,762	46.6	N/A
Liberal Democrats	R. Makepeace	1,038	27.4	N/A
Labour	A. Hornsby-Smith	671	17.7	N/A
Green	M. Dale	312	8.2	N/A
Majority		724	19.1	N/A
Turnout		3,784	69	N/A
Conservative win (new seat)				

Ploughley
Party	Candidate	Votes	%	±%
Conservative	C. Fulljames*	2,596	63.8	N/A
Liberal Democrats	E. Yardley	793	19.5	N/A
Labour	N. Cherry	677	16.7	N/A
Majority		1,803	44.3	N/A
Turnout		4,066	70.4	N/A
Conservative win (new seat)				

Shrivenham
Party	Candidate	Votes	%	±%
Conservative	A. Fitzgerald-O'Connor	2,574	52	N/A
Liberal Democrats	J. Hannaby	1,410	28.5	N/A
Labour	J. Douglas	700	14.2	N/A
Green	A. Hinkes	262	5.3	N/A
Majority		1,164	23.5	N/A
Turnout		4,948	68.5	N/A
Conservative win (new seat)				

Sonning Common
Party	Candidate	Votes	%	±%
Conservative	C. Viney*	2,758	61.9	N/A
Liberal Democrats	P. Wardle	843	18.9	N/A
Labour	N. Newman	576	12.9	N/A
Green	D. Allport	275	6.2	N/A
Majority		1,915	43	N/A
Turnout		4,454	71.6	N/A
Conservative win (new seat)				

Summertown & Wolvercote
Party	Candidate	Votes	%	±%
Liberal Democrats	J. Fooks*	3,266	37.9	N/A
Liberal Democrats	D.Roaf*	2,936		N/A
Green	J. Coleman	2,334	27.1	N/A
Green	C. Goodall	2,275		N/A
Conservative	R. Porter	2,011	23.4	N/A
Conservative	J. Wheatland	1,814		N/A
Labour	P. Clark	997	11.6	N/A
Labour	M. Taylor	934		N/A
Majority		932	10.8	N/A
Turnout		8,327	62.8	N/A
Liberal Democrats win (new seat)				
Liberal Democrats win (new seat)				

Sutton Courtenay & Harwell
Party	Candidate	Votes	%	±%
Conservative	C. Lamont	2,060	45.3	N/A
Liberal Democrats	R. Farrell*	1,603	35.2	N/A
Labour	R. Darke	573	12.6	N/A
Green	D. Sherwood	315	6.9	N/A
Majority		457	10.1	N/A
Turnout		4,551	68.6	N/A
Conservative win (new seat)				

Thame & Chinnor
Party	Candidate	Votes	%	±%
Conservative	D. Wilmshurst*	3,476	40.1	N/A
Conservative	N. Carter	3,333		N/A
Liberal Democrats	P. Haywood	3,292	38	N/A
Liberal Democrats	D. Laver	3,238		N/A
Labour	E. Atiken	1,392	16.1	N/A
Labour	J. Marfleet	1,169		N/A
Green	O. Tickell	498	5.8	N/A
Green	S. Drew	447		N/A
Majority		184	2.1	N/A
Turnout		8,465	64.6	N/A
Conservative win (new seat)				
Conservative win (new seat)				

Wallingford
Party	Candidate	Votes	%	±%
Liberal Democrats	W. Bradshaw*	2,037	46.0	N/A
Conservative	A. Dykes	1,499	33.8	N/A
Labour	M. Winters	593	13.4	N/A
Green	M. Belgrove Jones	215	4.9	N/A
English Democrat	G. Lambourne	88	2	N/A
Majority		538	12.1	N/A
Turnout		4,434	68.6	N/A
Liberal Democrats win (new seat)				

Watlington
Party	Candidate	Votes	%	±%
Conservative	R. Belson*	2,270	56.2	N/A
Liberal Democrats	B. Moseley	1,000	24.8	N/A
Labour	C. Chandler	480	11.9	N/A
Green	R. Sykes	286	7.1	N/A
Majority		1,170	31.5	N/A
Turnout		4,035	71.6	N/A
Conservative win (new seat)				

West Central Oxford
Party	Candidate	Votes	%	±%
Liberal Democrats	A. Armitage	2,867	34.5	N/A
Green	S. Dhall	2,936		N/A
Liberal Democrats	P. Sargent	2,383		N/A
Green	L. Squire	1,853		N/A
Labour	A. Naime	1,612	19.4	N/A
Conservative	E. Pryor	1,368	16.4	N/A
Conservative	W. Wilson	1,260		N/A
Labour	C. Witcher	1,195		N/A
Majority		393	4.7	N/A
Turnout		7,544	56.9	N/A
Liberal Democrats win (new seat)				
Green win (new seat)				

Wheatley
Party	Candidate	Votes	%	±%
Liberal Democrats	P. Purse*	2,168	49.6	N/A
Conservative	J. Walsh	1,304	29.8	N/A
Labour	M. Shields	610	13.9	N/A
Green	J. Battye	291	6.7	N/A
Majority		864	19.8	N/A
Turnout		4,373	67.7	N/A
Liberal Democrats win (new seat)				

Witney North & East
Party	Candidate	Votes	%	±%
Conservative	D. Robertson*	1,912	39.2	N/A
Liberal Democrats	D. Nicholson	1,305	26.8	N/A
Labour	D. Wesson	962	19.7	N/A
Green	R. Dossett-Davies	698	14.3	N/A
Majority		607	12.4	N/A
Turnout		4,878	66.6	N/A
Conservative win (new seat)				

Witney West
Party	Candidate	Votes	%	±%
Conservative	A. Harvey	2,766	35.1	N/A
Conservative	S. Hayward*	2,474		N/A
Labour	P. Edney	2,050	26	N/A
Labour	R. Kelsall	1,747		N/A
Liberal Democrats	P. Slamin	1,454	18.5	N/A
Independent	P. Green	975	12.4	N/A
Green	E. Dossett-Davies	630	8	N/A
Green	S. Simpson	517		N/A
Majority		716	9.1	N/A
Turnout		6,973	65	N/A
Conservative win (new seat)				
Conservative win (new seat)				

Woodstock
Party	Candidate	Votes	%	±%
Conservative	I. Hudspeth	1,964	40.8	N/A
Liberal Democrats	J. Cooper*	1,602	33.3	N/A
Labour	C. Carritt	915	19	N/A
Green	S. Turnbull	337	7	N/A
Majority		362	7.5	N/A
Turnout		4,821	71.5	N/A
Conservative win (new seat)				

Wootton
Party	Candidate	Votes	%	±%
Liberal Democrats	C. Wise	1,705	41.1	N/A
Conservative	E. Egawhary	1,510	36.4	N/A
Labour	D. Paskins	383	9.2	N/A
Green	A-M. Heslop	324	7.8	N/A
UKIP	J. Jones	229	5.5	N/A
Majority		195	4.7	N/A
Turnout		4,151	68.2	N/A
Liberal Democrats win (new seat)				

Wroxton
Party	Candidate	Votes	%	±%
Conservative	G. Reynolds*	2,788	57.8	N/A
Liberal Democrats	J. Johnson	887	18.4	N/A
Labour	H. Goodman	764	15.8	N/A
Green	M. Franklin	388	8	N/A
Majority		1,901	39.4	N/A
Turnout		4,826	75.2	N/A
Conservative win (new seat)				

Wychwood
Party	Candidate	Votes	%	±%
Conservative	R. Rose*	2,487	54.7	N/A
Liberal Democrats	M. West	1,005	22.1	N/A
Labour	G. Burrows	749	16.5	N/A
Green	J. Jones	304	6.7	N/A
Majority		1,382	32.6	N/A
Turnout		4,542	71.8	N/A
Conservative win (new seat)				
