= 2005 Dorset County Council election =

Local election in Dorset

Map of the results.

Elections to Dorset County Council were held on 5 May 2005, alongside other local elections across the United Kingdom. All 45 seats were up for election. The Conservative Party retained overall control of the council.

== Results summary ==
2005 Dorset County Council election
Party	Seats before	Seats after	Change
Conservative Party	23	24	▲1
Liberal Democrats	14	16	▲2
Labour Party	4	4	Steady
Independents	1	1	Steady
