= 2009 Nottinghamshire County Council election =

Elections to Nottinghamshire County Council

- 4 June 2009

All 67 seats to Nottinghamshire County Council 34 seats needed for a majority
- Turnout: 38.9%
	First party	Second party	Third party
Party	Conservative	Labour	Liberal Democrats
Last election	25	38	4
Seats won	35	13	9
Seat change	▲+10	▼-25	▲+5
Popular vote	92,753	55,600	43,645
Percentage	39.4%	23.6%	18.5%
Swing	▲+6.5	▼-13.9	▲+1.5
- Map of the results of the election coloured by victorious party
Leader before election
Labour
Elected Leader
Conservative

Elections to Nottinghamshire County Council took place on 4 June 2009, having been delayed from 7 May, in order to coincide with elections to the European Parliament.

The Conservative Party gained control of the council for the first time since 1977, albeit with a slim majority. The Labour Party suffered a historic defeat, winning just 13 of 67 council seats, a reduction of 25 seats compared with the 2005 election. The Liberal Democrats also made gains at the expense of Labour, and the Mansfield Independents won 6 seats in Mansfield, all of which were gained from Labour.

== Background ==
In the previous election, held on 5 May 2005, the Labour Party won a majority with 36 out of 67 seats. The Conservative Party were second with 26 seats, and the Liberal Democrats had five. Following the 2005 election, there were three by-elections, which all saw swings against Labour. The Conservatives gained Hucknall and the Liberal Democrats Sutton-in-Ashfield North from Labour, and the Labour Party's majority in Mansfield East was reduced by nearly two-thirds.

== Campaign ==
A key local issue was the planned extension of the Nottingham Express Transit tram system to Clifton and Toton, which was opposed by the Conservatives.

== Overall election results ==
Political composition of the council following the election

Overall Turnout
Registered electors	594,230
Votes cast	231,389
Turnout	38.9%

2009 Nottinghamshire County Council election
Party	Candidates	Seats	Gains	Losses	Net gain/loss	Seats %	Votes %	Votes	+/−
Conservative	67	35	10	0	▲+10		39.4	92,753	▲+6.5
Labour	65	13	0	25	▼-25		23.6	55,600	▼-13.9
Liberal Democrats	52	9	5	0	▲+5		18.5	43,645	▲+1.5
Mansfield Independent	9	6	6	0	▲+6		3.3	7,678	NEW
Independent	16	3	3	0	▲+3		4.7	11,067	▼-4.3
UKIP	13	1	1	0	▲+1		3.9	9,172	▲+3.8
BNP	15	0	0	0	Steady		3.4	7,935	▲+3.1
Green	13	0	0	0	Steady		2.5	5,982	▼-0.4
English Democrat	4	0	0	0	Steady		0.7	1,652	NEW

== Results by District ==
Nottinghamshire County Council is made up of 67 seats in a total of 54 electoral divisions across 7 districts: Ashfield District, Bassetlaw District, Broxtowe Borough, Gedling Borough, Mansfield District, Newark & Sherwood District, and Rushcliffe Borough.

=== Ashfield District ===
(10 seats, 8 electoral divisions)

Ashfield District
Party	Candidates						Votes		
Party	Stood	Elected	Gained	Unseated	Net	% of total	%	No.	Net %
Liberal Democrats	10	4	4	0	▲+4		23.5	7,859	▲+11.7
Labour	10	2	0	8	▼-8		22.8	7,624	▼-23.1
Conservative	10	2	2	0	▲+2		17.9	5,986	▲+2.9
UKIP	3	1	1	0	▲+1		7.6	2,541	NEW
Independent	9	1	1	0	▲+1		11.8	3,953	▼-7.1
BNP	8	0	0	0	Steady		12.8	4,289	NEW
Green	2	0	0	0	Steady		1.0	336	▼-5.4
English Democrat	2	0	0	0	Steady		2.7	897	NEW

Ashfield Turnout
Registered electors	89,906
Votes cast	31,480
Turnout	35.0%

==== Hucknall ====
Hucknall
Party	Candidate	Votes	%	±%
Conservative	Mick Murphy (inc)*	2,690	33.2	▼−0.9
UKIP	Tom Irvine	2,541	31.4	NEW
Conservative	Kevin Rostance	2,519	31.1	▼−1.8
Conservative	Robert Rankin	2,498	30.8	▲+0.3
Labour	Chris Baron (inc)	2,393	29.5	▼−23.3
Labour	Dave Shaw (inc)	2,258	27.9	▼−24.6
Labour	Trev Locke	2,213	27.3	▼−25.1
UKIP	Kenneth Browne	1,204	14.9	NEW
UKIP	Mark Brinsley-Day	1,202	14.8	NEW
Liberal Democrats	Kevin Moore	1,125	13.9	NEW
Liberal Democrats	Harry Toseland	1,058	13.1	NEW
BNP	Susan Gamble	905	11.2	NEW
Liberal Democrats	Austin Rathe	881	10.9	NEW
English Democrat	Kevin Worrall	602	7.4	NEW
Independent	Geoff Thorpe	223	2.8	NEW
Turnout		8,104	34.1	
Registered electors		23,789		
Conservative gain from Labour		Swing		
UKIP gain from Labour		Swing		
Conservative gain from Labour		Swing		

* Incumbent following election at by-election, 25 January 2007

==== Kirkby in Ashfield North ====
Kirkby in Ashfield North
Party	Candidate	Votes	%	±%
Labour	John Knight (inc)	842	26.4	▼−10.3
BNP	Michael Clarke	722	22.6	NEW
Independent	Wendy Harvey	597	18.7	▼−2.2
Conservative	James Thornton	445	13.9	NEW
Liberal Democrats	Melvin Grant	412	12.9	▼−2.0
Independent	Dave Spalding	174	5.5	NEW
Turnout		3,192	31.3	
Registered electors		10,208		
Labour hold		Swing		

==== Kirkby in Ashfield South ====
Kirkby in Ashfield South
Party	Candidate	Votes	%	±%
Liberal Democrats	Rachel Madden	1,752	39.3	▲+24.1
Labour	Yvonne Davidson (inc)	868	19.5	▼−19.8
Conservative	Robert Copley	614	13.8	NEW
BNP	Darran Burke	482	10.8	NEW
English Democrat	Tony Ellis	295	6.6	NEW
Green	Lisa Brown	257	5.8	▼−4.3
Independent	Tony Brown	191	4.3	NEW
Turnout		4,459	40.4	
Registered electors		11,041		
Liberal Democrats gain from Labour		Swing		

==== Selston ====
Selston
Party	Candidate	Votes	%	±%
Independent	Gail Turner	1,593	36.7	▼−2.4
Liberal Democrats	Robert Sears-Piccavey	1,037	23.9	▲+6.5
BNP	Edward Holmes	734	16.9	NEW
Labour	Stephen Mays	557	12.8	▼−30.6
Conservative	Brian Jarvis	343	7.9	NEW
Green	Kevin Bradford	79	1.8	NEW
Turnout		4,343	43.4	
Registered electors		10,006		
Independent gain from Labour		Swing		

==== Sutton in Ashfield Central ====
Sutton in Ashfield Central
Party	Candidate	Votes	%	±%
Liberal Democrats	Michelle Gent	801	29.6	▲+13.4
Labour	Edward Llewellyn-Jones (inc)	696	25.8	▼−25.2
Conservative	Christine Vernon	384	14.2	▼−4.9
BNP	Jane Clarke	347	12.8	NEW
Independent	Leslie Matthews	276	10.2	NEW
Independent	Tony Johnson	198	7.3	NEW
Turnout		2,702	31.3	
Registered electors		8,643		
Liberal Democrats gain from Labour		Swing		

==== Sutton in Ashfield East ====
Sutton in Ashfield East
Party	Candidate	Votes	%	±%
Labour	Steve Carroll (inc)	772	27.3	▼−25.2
Liberal Democrats	Philip Smith	628	22.2	▼−0.8
Conservative	John Baker	426	15.1	NEW
Independent	Tony Wallis	401	14.2	NEW
Independent	David Parker	300	10.6	NEW
BNP	Paul Gamble	299	10.6	NEW
Turnout		2,826	32.1	
Registered electors		8,817		
Labour hold		Swing		

==== Sutton in Ashfield North ====
Sutton in Ashfield North
Party	Candidate	Votes	%	±%
Liberal Democrats	Jason Zadrozny (inc)*	1,038	37.7	▲+23.8
Labour	Trish Phillips	738	26.8	▼−18.0
Conservative	Michael Halls	562	20.4	▼−3.4
BNP	Michael Clarke	418	15.2	NEW
Turnout		2,932	34.3	
Registered electors		8,542		
Liberal Democrats gain from Labour		Swing		

* Incumbent following election at by-election, 22 March 2007

==== Sutton in Ashfield West ====
Sutton in Ashfield West
Party	Candidate	Votes	%	±%
Liberal Democrats	Fiona Asbury	1,066	39.1	▲+25.8
Labour	David Kirkham (inc)	758	27.8	▼−18.7
Conservative	Michael Champion	522	19.1	▼−4.1
BNP	Hilda Holmes	382	14.0	NEW
Turnout		2,922	33.0	
Registered electors		8,860		
Liberal Democrats gain from Labour		Swing		

=== Bassetlaw District ===
(9 seats, 9 electoral divisions)

Bassetlaw District
Party	Candidates						Votes		
Party	Stood	Elected	Gained	Unseated	Net	% of total	%	No.	Net %
Conservative	9	5	3	0	▲+3		52.5	15,517	▲+15.1
Labour	9	4	0	3	▼-3		38.3	11,318	▼-10.9
Liberal Democrats	3	0	0	0	Steady		6.5	1,933	NEW
Independent	1	0	0	0	Steady		2.6	762	▼-10.8

Bassetlaw Turnout
Registered electors	84,413
Votes cast	30,167
Turnout	35.7%

==== Blyth & Harworth ====
Blyth & Harworth
Party	Candidate	Votes	%	±%
Labour	Sheila Place (inc)	1,663	52.7	Steady
Conservative	Chris Wanless	1,492	47.3	NEW
Turnout		3,226	34.1	
Registered electors		9,453		
Labour hold		Swing		

==== Misterton ====
Misterton
Party	Candidate	Votes	%	±%
Conservative	Liz Yates	3,321	76.5	▲+14.0
Labour	David Challinor	1,023	23.5	▼−14.0
Turnout		4,477	42.5	
Registered electors		10,530		
Conservative hold		Swing		

==== Retford East ====
Retford East
Party	Candidate	Votes	%	±%
Conservative	Wendy Quigley	1,933	62.1	▲+14.4
Labour	Mick Storey (inc)	1,182	37.9	▼−14.4
Turnout		3,182	37.3	
Registered electors		8,530		
Conservative gain from Labour		Swing		

==== Retford West ====
Retford West
Party	Candidate	Votes	%	±%
Conservative	Michael Quigley	1,305	46.3	▼−0.8
Labour	James Napier (inc)	942	33.4	▼−19.5
Liberal Democrats	David Hassett	574	20.3	NEW
Turnout		2,853	34.3	
Registered electors		8,329		
Conservative gain from Labour		Swing		

==== Tuxford ====
Tuxford
Party	Candidate	Votes	%	±%
Conservative	John Hempsall (inc)	2,511	61.0	▼−1.7
Liberal Democrats	Brian Cane	910	22.1	NEW
Labour	Marilyn McCarthy	694	16.9	▼−20.4
Turnout		4,179	40.7	
Registered electors		10,262		
Conservative hold		Swing		

==== Worksop East ====
Worksop East
Party	Candidate	Votes	%	±%
Labour	Glynn Gilfoyle (inc)	1,525	54.2	▼−8.4
Independent	Geoff Coe	762	27.1	▼−10.3
Conservative	Tracey Taylor	527	18.7	NEW
Turnout		2,871	30.7	
Registered electors		9,367		
Labour hold		Swing		

==== Worksop North ====
Worksop North
Party	Candidate	Votes	%	±%
Labour	Sybil Fielding (inc)	1,711	54.5	▲+1.4
Conservative	Jonathan Sheppard	1,426	45.5	▲+18.2
Turnout		3,228	31.4	
Registered electors		10,288		
Labour hold		Swing		

==== Worksop North East & Carlton ====
Worksop North East & Carlton
Party	Candidate	Votes	%	±%
Labour	Alan Rhodes (inc)	1,669	51.1	▼−0.8
Conservative	Bill Graham	1,599	48.9	▲+13.4
Turnout		3,362	36.3	
Registered electors		9,271		
Labour hold		Swing		

==== Worksop West ====
Worksop West
Party	Candidate	Votes	%	±%
Conservative	Michael Bennett	1,403	50.8	▲+13.2
Labour	David Potts	909	32.9	▼−17.4
Liberal Democrats	Mark Hunter	449	16.3	NEW
Turnout		2,789	33.3	
Registered electors		8,383		
Conservative gain from Labour		Swing		

=== Broxtowe Borough ===
(10 seats, 8 electoral divisions)

Broxtowe District
Party	Candidates						Votes		
Party	Stood	Elected	Gained	Unseated	Net	% of total	%	No.	Net %
Conservative	10	5	1	0	▲+1		35.4	14,008	▲+4.4
Liberal Democrats	9	5	1	0	▲+1		26.8	10,596	▲+0.8
Labour	9	0	0	2	▼-2		19.1	7,559	▼-15.4
Green	6	0	0	0	Steady		4.9	1,931	▲+1.3
BNP	3	0	0	0	Steady		4.9	1,924	▲+4.0
UKIP	2	0	0	0	Steady		4.5	1,799	NEW
Independent	1	0	0	0	Steady		4.4	1,741	▲+0.8

Broxtowe Turnout
Registered electors	83,096
Votes cast	37,643
Turnout	45.3%

==== Beauvale ====
Beauvale
Party	Candidate	Votes	%	±%
Conservative	David Taylor (inc)	1,532	43.3	▲+4.9
BNP	Dave Brown	698	19.7	▲+10.4
Liberal Democrats	Bob Charlesworth	657	18.6	▲+4.5
Labour	Jen Cole	650	18.4	▼−19.7
Turnout		3,554	43.6	
Registered electors		8,159		
Conservative hold		Swing		

==== Beeston North ====
Beeston North
Party	Candidate	Votes	%	±%
Liberal Democrats	Steve Carr (inc)	2,026	53.1	▲+15.4
Conservative	Philip Hopkinson	905	23.7	▲+1.5
Labour	Kate Foale	549	14.4	▼−18.6
Green	Paul Anderson	334	8.8	▲+3.2
Turnout		3,833	48.5	
Registered electors		7,897		
Liberal Democrats hold		Swing		

==== Beeston South & Attenborough ====
Beeston South & Attenborough
Party	Candidate	Votes	%	±%
Conservative	Eric Kerry	1,889	41.0	▲+9.4
Labour	Pat Lally (inc)	1,700	36.9	▼−2.7
Liberal Democrats	Graham Hopcroft	432	9.4	▼−11.0
Green	Sylvia Rule	306	6.6	▲+0.1
BNP	Wayne Shelbourn	278	6.0	NEW
Turnout		4,619	51.2	
Registered electors		9,028		
Conservative gain from Labour		Swing		

==== Bramcote & Stapleford ====
Bramcote & Stapleford
Party	Candidate	Votes	%	±%
Liberal Democrats	Stan Heptinstall (inc)	3,281	42.0	▼−0.1
Liberal Democrats	Brian Wombwell (inc)	3,095	39.6	▲+0.1
Conservative	John Doddy	2,528	32.4	▲+8.4
Conservative	Philip Brooks-Stephenson	2,245	28.7	▲+6.0
Labour	John McGrath	1,418	18.1	▼−9.9
Labour	Geoff Ward	1,119	14.3	▼−11.9
UKIP	Chris Cobb	1,013	13.0	NEW
Green	Emma Fawcett	507	6.5	▲+1.2
Green	Mary Venning	394	5.0	NEW
Turnout		7,814	45.5	
Registered electors		17,178		
Liberal Democrats hold		Swing		
Liberal Democrats hold		Swing		

==== Chilwell & Toton ====
Chilwell & Toton
Party	Candidate	Votes	%	±%
Conservative	Tom Pettengell (inc)	3,388	50.1	▲+12.3
Conservative	Richard Jackson (inc)	3,356	49.6	▲+12.3
Labour	Ed Jacobs	1,442	21.3	▼−13.4
Labour	Atul Joshi	1,135	16.8	▼−13.3
Liberal Democrats	Dave Pearson	1,076	15.9	▲+0.2
Liberal Democrats	Christine Wombwell	998	14.7	▼−0.9
UKIP	Keith Marriott	786	11.6	NEW
Green	Richard Eddleston	658	9.7	▲+3.5
BNP	Mary Clifton	546	8.1	NEW
Green	David Mitchell	500	7.4	NEW
Turnout		6,769	42.6	
Registered electors		15,889		
Conservative hold		Swing		
Conservative hold		Swing		

==== Eastwood ====
Eastwood
Party	Candidate	Votes	%	±%
Liberal Democrats	Keith Longdon	1,539	49.7	▲+32.8
Labour	Milan Radulovic	888	28.7	▼−18.8
Conservative	Graham Kilbourne	672	21.7	▲+0.3
Turnout		3,151	38.3	
Registered electors		8,236		
Liberal Democrats gain from Labour		Swing		

==== Kimberley & Trowell ====
Kimberley & Trowell
Party	Candidate	Votes	%	±%
Liberal Democrats	Ken Rigby (inc)	1,585	36.3	▼−1.0
Conservative	Shane Easom	1,342	30.7	▼−0.1
Labour	Richard Robinson	912	20.9	▼−11.0
BNP	Kevin Lambert	402	9.2	NEW
Green	Gordon Stoner	126	2.9	NEW
Turnout		4,377	49.0	
Registered electors		8,931		
Liberal Democrats hold		Swing		

==== Nuthall ====
Nuthall
Party	Candidate	Votes	%	±%
Conservative	Philip Owen (inc)	1,752	50.2	▲+11.8
Independent	Sue Wildey	1,741	49.8	▲+27.9
Turnout		3,526	45.3	
Registered electors		7,778		
Conservative hold		Swing		

=== Gedling Borough ===
(10 seats, 6 electoral divisions)

Gedling District
Party	Candidates						Votes		
Party	Stood	Elected	Gained	Unseated	Net	% of total	%	No.	Net %
Conservative	10	7	4	0	▲+4		43.9	15,457	▲+3.9
Labour	10	3	0	4	▼-4		29.4	10,364	▼-10.7
Liberal Democrats	8	0	0	0	Steady		16.8	5,914	▼-1.0
UKIP	3	0	0	0	Steady		6.0	2,109	▲+5.0
BNP	3	0	0	0	Steady		4.0	1,399	▲+2.9

Gedling Turnout
Registered electors	87,593
Votes cast	35,111
Turnout	40.1%

==== Arnold North ====
Arnold North
Party	Candidate	Votes	%	±%
Conservative	Gerald Clarke	3,343	48.7	▲+9.5
Conservative	Carol Pepper	3,255	47.4	▲+8.3
Labour	Pauline Allan	1,995	29.0	▼−16.6
Labour	John Stocks (inc)	1,805	26.3	▼−13.3
Liberal Democrats	Sandra Thornley	1,361	19.8	▲+1.8
Liberal Democrats	Roger Patterson	1,352	19.7	▲+1.8
Turnout		6,869	37.1	
Registered electors		18,522		
Conservative gain from Labour		Swing		
Conservative gain from Labour		Swing		

==== Arnold South ====
Arnold South
Party	Candidate	Votes	%	±%
Conservative	Rod Kempster (inc)	3,257	41.8	▼−1.3
Conservative	Melvyn Shepherd	2,948	37.8	▼−0.5
Labour	Peter Barnes (inc)	2,210	28.4	▼−12.4
Labour	Paul Key	2,044	26.2	▼−9.1
Liberal Democrats	Andrew Swift	1,521	19.5	▲+0.3
Liberal Democrats	Tadeusz Jones	1,502	19.3	▲+1.1
UKIP	Anthony Ellwood	1,135	14.6	▲+10.1
Turnout		7,793	42.0	
Registered electors		18,562		
Conservative hold		Swing		
Conservative gain from Labour		Swing		

==== Calverton ====
Calverton
Party	Candidate	Votes	%	±%
Conservative	Mark Spencer (inc)	2,229	70.5	▲+15.1
Labour	Michael Hope	934	29.5	▼−15.1
Turnout		3,236	40.7	
Registered electors		7,951		
Conservative hold		Swing		

==== Carlton East ====
Carlton East
Party	Candidate	Votes	%	±%
Labour	John Clarke (inc)	2,165	30.5	▼−8.4
Conservative	Allen Clarke	2,144	30.2	▼−2.2
Labour	James O'Riordan (inc)	2,099	29.5	▼−6.6
Conservative	Cheryl Clarke	2,035	28.6	▼−2.7
Liberal Democrats	Richard Berry	1,960	27.6	▼−5.2
Liberal Democrats	Richard Fife	1,811	25.5	▼−4.3
BNP	Stephen Adcock	739	10.4	NEW
BNP	Jean Katimertzis	556	7.8	NEW
Turnout		7,106	41.1	
Registered electors		17,287		
Labour hold		Swing		
Conservative gain from Labour		Swing		

==== Carlton West ====
Carlton West
Party	Candidate	Votes	%	±%
Labour	Jim Creamer (inc)	2,191	32.3	▼−10.8
Labour	Darrell Pulk (inc)	2,152	31.7	▼−9.6
Conservative	Thomas Butcher	2,030	29.9	▼−3.3
Conservative	Eric Collin	2,025	29.8	▼−2.9
Liberal Democrats	Paul Hughes	1,072	15.8	▼−6.7
Liberal Democrats	Christopher Pratt	994	14.7	▼−6.6
UKIP	Deva Kumarasiri	974	14.4	NEW
UKIP	Anthony Prior	971	14.3	NEW
BNP	William Bell	660	9.7	NEW
Turnout		6,784	38.8	
Registered electors		17,479		
Labour hold		Swing		
Labour hold		Swing		

==== Newstead ====
Newstead
Party	Candidate	Votes	%	±%
Conservative	Christopher Barnfather	2,454	73.8	▲+9.5
Labour	Carol Wright	869	26.2	▼−9.5
Turnout		3,323	42.6	
Registered electors		7,792		
Conservative hold		Swing		

=== Mansfield District ===
(9 seats, 5 electoral divisions)

Mansfield District
Party	Candidates						Votes		
Party	Stood	Elected	Gained	Unseated	Net	% of total	%	No.	Net %
Mansfield Independent	9	6	6	0	▲+6		30.5	7,678	NEW
Labour	9	3	0	6	▼-6		29.9	7,537	▼-9.4
Conservative	9	0	0	0	Steady		23.2	5,828	▲+6.5
Liberal Democrats	7	0	0	0	Steady		9.2	2,303	▼-6.2
UKIP	2	0	0	0	Steady		5.3	1,335	NEW
English Democrat	1	0	0	0	Steady		1.9	487	NEW

Mansfield Turnout
Registered electors	81,523
Votes cast	25,572
Turnout	31.4%

==== Mansfield East ====
Mansfield East
Party	Candidate	Votes	%	±%
Mansfield Independent	Bob Cross	1,891	33.3	NEW
Mansfield Independent	Martin Wright	1,883	33.2	NEW
Labour	Helen Holt (inc)*	1,629	28.7	▼−12.2
Conservative	Brian Marshall	1,558	27.4	▲+5.6
Labour	Chris Winterton (inc)	1,423	25.1	▼−4.1
Conservative	Muriel Ragis	1,262	22.2	▲+3.5
Turnout		5,677	31.3	
Registered electors		18,115		
Mansfield Independent gain from Labour		Swing		
Mansfield Independent gain from Labour		Swing		

* Incumbent following election at by-election, 28 September 2006

==== Mansfield North ====
Mansfield North
Party	Candidate	Votes	%	±%
Labour	Joyce Bosnjak (inc)	1,758	30.4	▼−10.1
Labour	Parry Tsimbiridis (inc)	1,494	25.8	▼−4.1
UKIP	Andrea Hamilton	1,335	23.1	NEW
UKIP	David Hamilton	1,328	22.9	NEW
Mansfield Independent	Mick Barton	1,033	17.9	NEW
Conservative	Drew Stafford	1,007	17.4	▼−2.1
Conservative	Janet Ward	908	15.7	NEW
Mansfield Independent	David Smith	764	13.2	NEW
Liberal Democrats	Veronica Goddard	756	13.1	▼−9.4
Liberal Democrats	Marc Hollingworth	651	11.2	▼−10.2
Turnout		5,787	32.2	
Registered electors		17,980		
Labour hold		Swing		
Labour hold		Swing		

==== Mansfield South ====
Mansfield South
Party	Candidate	Votes	%	±%
Mansfield Independent	Tom Appleby	2,043	33.4	NEW
Mansfield Independent	Stephen Garner	1,960	32.0	NEW
Conservative	Nick Bennett	1,791	29.3	▲+9.9
Conservative	Philip Smith	1,483	24.2	▲+6.5
Labour	Albert Haynes (inc)	1,259	20.6	▼−14.2
Labour	David Harrison	1,187	19.4	▼−5.7
Liberal Democrats	Adrian Bacon	698	11.4	▼−5.2
Liberal Democrats	Kristyna Ellis	610	10.0	NEW
English Democrat	Diane Bilgrami	487	8.0	NEW
Turnout		6,121	32.0	
Registered electors		19,118		
Mansfield Independent gain from Labour		Swing		
Mansfield Independent gain from Labour		Swing		

==== Mansfield West ====
Mansfield West
Party	Candidate	Votes	%	±%
Mansfield Independent	June Stendall	2,034	39.6	NEW
Mansfield Independent	Vic Bobo	1,675	32.6	NEW
Labour	Paul Henshaw	1,520	29.6	▼−11.5
Labour	John Carter (inc)	1,511	29.4	▼−15.2
Conservative	Mark Fretwell	889	17.3	▲+2.0
Conservative	Fraser McFarland	716	13.9	NEW
Liberal Democrats	Anna Ellis	653	12.7	▼−3.9
Liberal Democrats	Nicholas Spencer	631	12.3	NEW
Turnout		5,141	30.2	
Registered electors		17,016		
Mansfield Independent gain from Labour		Swing		
Mansfield Independent gain from Labour		Swing		

==== Warsop ====
Warsop
Party	Candidate	Votes	%	±%
Labour	John Allin (inc)	1,371	48.5	▼−13.2
Mansfield Independent	John Milnes	677	23.9	NEW
Conservative	Michael Ward	583	20.6	▲+9.3
Liberal Democrats	Victoria Zadrozny	196	6.9	NEW
Turnout		2,846	30.6	
Registered electors		9,294		
Labour hold		Swing		

=== Newark & Sherwood District ===
(10 seats, 10 electoral divisions)

Newark and Sherwood District
Party	Candidates						Votes		
Party	Stood	Elected	Gained	Unseated	Net	% of total	%	No.	Net %
Conservative	10	7	0	0	Steady		52.1	16,881	▲+10.2
Independent	5	2	2	0	▲+2		11.3	3,667	▲+3.4
Labour	9	1	0	2	▼-2		18.2	5,886	▼-11.8
Liberal Democrats	6	0	0	0	Steady		18.4	5,955	▼-1.8

Newark & Sherwood Turnout
Registered electors	83,506
Votes cast	32,746
Turnout	39.2%

==== Balderton ====
Balderton
Party	Candidate	Votes	%	±%
Conservative	Keith Walker (inc)	1,401	59.1	▲+15.3
Liberal Democrats	Neil Allen	559	23.6	▲+3.9
Labour	Carola Richards	410	17.3	▼−19.1
Turnout		2,399	31.4	
Registered electors		7,648		
Conservative hold		Swing		

==== Blidworth ====
Blidworth
Party	Candidate	Votes	%	±%
Independent	Geoff Merry	852	34.7	▼−9.1
Labour	Yvonne Woodhead (inc)	802	32.6	▼−23.6
Conservative	Rod Allen	496	20.2	NEW
Independent	Kevan Wakefield	307	12.5	NEW
Turnout		2,468	32.7	
Registered electors		7,549		
Independent gain from Labour		Swing		

==== Collingham ====
Collingham
Party	Candidate	Votes	%	±%
Conservative	Vincent Dobson (inc)	2,160	62.0	▲+11.5
Liberal Democrats	Marylyn Rayner	1,325	38.0	▲+18.2
Turnout		3,550	36.7	
Registered electors		9,673		
Conservative hold		Swing		

==== Farndon & Muskham ====
Farndon & Muskham
Party	Candidate	Votes	%	±%
Conservative	Sue Saddington (inc)	2,178	68.9	▲+14.7
Liberal Democrats	Antony Barson	657	20.8	▼−7.4
Labour	Brian Howes	328	10.4	▼−7.2
Turnout		3,183	47.6	
Registered electors		6,685		
Conservative hold		Swing		

==== Farnsfield & Lowdham ====
Farnsfield & Lowdham
Party	Candidate	Votes	%	±%
Conservative	Andy Stewart (inc)	3,333	79.1	▲+22.1
Labour	Celia Brooks	879	20.9	▼−0.2
Turnout		4,302	50.1	
Registered electors		8,593		
Conservative hold		Swing		

==== Newark East ====
Newark East
Party	Candidate	Votes	%	±%
Conservative	Peter Prebble (inc)	1,267	51.6	▲+10.1
Liberal Democrats	Chris Harrison	746	30.4	▲+9.0
Labour	John Bell	441	18.0	▼−19.1
Turnout		2,483	31.5	
Registered electors		7,877		
Conservative hold		Swing		

==== Newark West ====
Newark West
Party	Candidate	Votes	%	±%
Conservative	Keith Girling (inc)	980	42.6	▲+0.7
Independent	Gill Dawn	483	21.0	NEW
Labour	Ian Campbell	450	19.6	▼−19.1
Liberal Democrats	Declan Logue	387	16.8	▼−2.6
Turnout		2,313	32.2	
Registered electors		7,193		
Conservative hold		Swing		

==== Ollerton & Boughton ====
Ollerton & Boughton
Party	Candidate	Votes	%	±%
Labour	Stella Smedley	1,202	40.6	N/A
Conservative	Mary Brown	1,042	35.2	N/A
Independent	Mick McLelland	716	24.2	N/A
Turnout		2,980	34.2	
Registered electors		8,704		
Labour hold		Swing		

==== Rufford ====
Rufford
Party	Candidate	Votes	%	±%
Independent	Les Ward	1,309	35.6	NEW
Conservative	Mike Butler	1,259	34.2	▲+8.5
Labour	Andrew Freeman (inc)	1,109	30.2	▼−18.2
Turnout		3,718	37.1	
Registered electors		10,031		
Independent gain from Labour		Swing		

==== Southwell & Caunton ====
Southwell & Caunton
Party	Candidate	Votes	%	±%
Conservative	Bruce Laughton (inc)	2,765	52.1	▼−0.5
Liberal Democrats	Peter Harris	2,281	42.9	▼−4.5
Labour	Glenn Bardill	265	5.0	NEW
Turnout		5,350	56.0	
Registered electors		9,553		
Conservative hold		Swing		

=== Rushcliffe Borough ===
(9 seats, 8 electoral divisions)

Rushcliffe District
Party	Candidates						Votes		
Party	Stood	Elected	Gained	Unseated	Net	% of total	%	No.	Net %
Conservative	9	9	0	0	Steady		49.8	19,076	▲+4.5
Liberal Democrats	9	0	0	0	Steady		21.4	8,206	▼-4.0
Labour	9	0	0	0	Steady		13.9	5,312	▼-11.4
Green	5	0	0	0	Steady		7.8	2,983	▲+4.0
UKIP	3	0	0	0	Steady		3.6	1,388	NEW
BNP	1	0	0	0	Steady		0.8	323	NEW
English Democrat	1	0	0	0	Steady		0.7	268	NEW

Rushcliffe Turnout
Registered electors	84,193
Votes cast	38,670
Turnout	45.9%

==== Bingham ====
Bingham
Party	Candidate	Votes	%	±%
Conservative	Martin Suthers (inc)	2,020	48.7	▲+5.3
Liberal Democrats	George Davidson	1,207	29.1	▼−1.5
Independent	Terry Coleman	510	12.3	NEW
Labour	Alan Tiplady	410	9.9	▼−13.8
Turnout		4,166	43.9	
Registered electors		9,486		
Conservative hold		Swing		

==== Cotgrave ====
Cotgrave
Party	Candidate	Votes	%	±%
Conservative	Richard Butler (inc)	1,807	53.1	▲+7.8
Labour	Andrew Clayworth	522	15.3	▼−20.2
Liberal Democrats	Diane Rotherham	387	11.4	▼−7.8
UKIP	Rach Wolfe	367	10.8	NEW
BNP	Tony Woodward	323	9.5	NEW
Turnout		3,420	40.2	
Registered electors		8,505		
Conservative hold		Swing		

==== Keyworth ====
Keyworth
Party	Candidate	Votes	%	±%
Conservative	John Cottee (inc)	2,484	56.1	▲+8.4
Liberal Democrats	Debbie Boote	1,313	29.7	▼−10.8
Green	Tony Latham	371	8.4	NEW
Labour	Richard Crawley	259	5.9	▼−5.9
Turnout		4,454	53.2	
Registered electors		8,377		
Conservative hold		Swing		

==== Radcliffe on Trent ====
Radcliffe on Trent
Party	Candidate	Votes	%	±%
Conservative	Kay Cutts (inc)	2,724	58.8	▲+4.6
Labour	Steve Collins	784	16.9	▼−5.5
Liberal Democrats	Susan Hull	613	13.2	▼−10.2
Green	Andrew Mattison	514	11.1	
Turnout		4,665	48.3	
Registered electors		9,653		
Conservative hold		Swing		

==== Ruddington ====
Ruddington
Party	Candidate	Votes	%	±%
Conservative	Reg Adair (inc)	1,918	48.7	▲+0.9
Liberal Democrats	Barbara Venes	981	24.9	▼−2.9
Labour	Ian Wilson	403	10.2	▼−8.8
UKIP	Pete Wolfe	398	10.1	NEW
Independent	David Hall	240	6.1	NEW
Turnout		3,957	45.6	
Registered electors		8,687		
Conservative hold		Swing		

==== Soar Valley ====
Soar Valley
Party	Candidate	Votes	%	±%
Conservative	Lynn Sykes (inc)	2,502	59.6	▲+11.7
Liberal Democrats	Sheila Gauld	885	21.1	▼−0.6
Labour	Paul Morrissey	811	19.3	▲−11.1
Turnout		4,262	45.8	
Registered electors		9,302		
Conservative hold		Swing		

==== West Bridgford Central & South ====
West Bridgford Central & South
Party	Candidate	Votes	%	±%
Conservative	Michael Cox (inc)	3,432	38.9	▲+1.2
Conservative	Barrie Cooper (inc)	3,401	38.6	▲+1.8
Green	Sue Mallender	1,787	20.3	▲+9.9
Green	Richard Mallender	1,616	18.3	▲+8.9
Labour	Liz Plant	1,578	17.9	▼−11.7
Labour	Alistair MacInnes	1,563	17.7	▼−11.3
Liberal Democrats	Keith Jamieson	1,223	13.9	▼−6.8
Liberal Democrats	Steve Travis	1,217	13.8	▼−5.1
UKIP	Matthew Faithfull	623	7.1	NEW
Turnout		8,820	43.3	
Registered electors		20,392		
Conservative hold		Swing		
Conservative hold		Swing		

==== West Bridgford West ====
West Bridgford West
Party	Candidate	Votes	%	±%
Conservative	Gordon Wheeler	2,189	44.6	▲+0.1
Liberal Democrats	Karrar Khan	1,597	32.5	▲+10.3
Labour	Peter Vallelly	545	11.1	▼−15.7
Green	Simon Anthony	311	6.3	▼−0.1
English Democrat	Barrie Worrall	268	5.5	NEW
Turnout		4,926	50.3	
Registered electors		9,791		
Conservative hold		Swing		

== By-Elections between June 2009 – April 2013 ==
By-elections are called when a representative Councillor resigns or dies, so are unpredictable. A by-election is held to fill a political office that has become vacant between the scheduled elections.

1. Newark East - 17 September 2009

Newark East By-Election 17 September 2009
Party	Candidate	Votes	%	±%
Conservative	Stuart Wallace	517	45.2	−6.4
Liberal Democrats	Chris Harrison	322	28.1	−2.3
Labour	Glenn Bardill	198	17.3	−0.7
UKIP	Terry Coleman	107	9.4	+9.4
Majority		195	17.1	
Turnout		1,144	15.6	
Conservative hold		Swing		

2. Mansfield South - 25 February 2010

Mansfield South By-Election 25 February 2010
Party	Candidate	Votes	%	±%
Labour	Chris Winterton	1,342	33.5	+13.4
Mansfield Independent Forum	Andrew Tristram	1,108	27.6	−12.7
Conservative	Drew Stafford	774	19.3	−9.2
UKIP	Nick Bennet	489	12.2	+12.2
Liberal Democrats	Danielle Gent	295	7.4	−3.8
Majority		234	5.9	
Turnout		4,008	20.9	
Labour gain from Independent		Swing		

3. Worksop West - 16 September 2010

Worksop West By-Election 25 February 2010
Party	Candidate	Votes	%	±%
Labour	Kevin Maurizio Greaves	1,457	61.5	
Conservative	Alec Thorpe	755	31.9	
Liberal Democrats	Leon Maurice Duveen	88	3.7	
Independent	Ronald Dawes	56	2.4	
Independent	Terry George Coleman	13	0.6	
Majority		702		
Turnout		2,369		
Labour gain from Conservative		Swing		

4. Chilwell & Toton - 15 March 2012

Chilwell & Toton By-Election 15 March 2012
Party	Candidate	Votes	%	±%
Conservative	John Doddy	1,958	47.7	+5.9
Liberal Democrats	David Watts	1,375	33.5	+20.6
UKIP	Lee Waters	682	16.6	+7.0
Majority		583	14.2	
Turnout		4,102	25.6	
Conservative hold		Swing		

5. Rufford - 20 September 2012

Rufford By-Election 20 September 2012
Party	Candidate	Votes	%	±%
Labour	John Peck	1,557	58.0	+27.8
Conservative	Daniel Mottishaw	660	24.6	−9.7
Nottinghamshire Independents	Jim Gregson	346	12.9	−22.7
UKIP	Carole Terzza	123	4.6	+4.6
Majority		897	33.4	
Turnout		2,686	24.52	
Labour gain from Independent		Swing		
