= 2009 Oxfordshire County Council election =

2009 UK local government election

← 2005	4 June 2009	2013 →

All 74 seats to Oxfordshire County Council 38 seats needed for a majority
	Majority party	Minority party	Third party
Party	Conservative	Liberal Democrats	Labour
Last election	43	16	8
Seats won	51	10	9
Seat change	▲8	▼5	▲1
Percentage	42.81%	23.87%	15.09%
	Fourth party	Fifth party
Party	Green	Independent
Last election	5	2
Seats won	2	1
Seat change	▼2	▼1
Percentage	13.87%	3.96%
- 2009 local election results in Oxfordshire
Party before election
Conservative
Elected Party
Conservative

An election to Oxfordshire County Council took place on 4 June 2009 as part of the 2009 United Kingdom local elections, having been delayed from 7 May, to coincide with elections to the European Parliament. 74 councillors were elected from various electoral divisions, which returned either one, two or three county councillors each by first-past-the-post voting for a four-year term of office. The electoral divisions were the same as those used at the previous election in 2005.

All locally registered electors (British, Irish, Commonwealth and European Union citizens) who were aged 18 or over on Thursday 4 June 2009 were entitled to vote in the local elections. Those who were temporarily away from their ordinary address (for example, away working, on holiday, in student accommodation or in hospital) were also entitled to vote in the local elections, although those who had moved abroad and registered as overseas electors cannot vote in the local elections. It is possible to register to vote at more than one address (such as a university student who had a term-time address and lives at home during holidays) at the discretion of the local Electoral Register Office, but it remains an offence to vote more than once in the same local government election.

== Summary ==
The election saw the Conservative Party increase their majority on the council by an extra 8 seats, the party won two thirds of the seats in the council. The Liberal Democrats remained the councils official opposition despite losing 5 seats. Labour gained a seat and the Greens lost 3 seats, reducing their representation down to 2 councillors. One Independent lost his seat, the other was re-elected.

== Results ==
Oxfordshire County Council election, 2009
Party	Seats	Gains	Losses	Net gain/loss	Seats %	Votes %	Votes	+/−
Conservative	51	8	0	+8	70	42.81%		
Liberal Democrats	10	0	5	-5	13.5	23.87%		
Labour	9	1	0	+1	12.2	15.09%		
Green	2	0	3	-3	2.7	13.87%		
Independent	1	0	1	-1	1.35	3.96%		
