= 2005 Northumberland County Council election =

2005 UK local government election

- 5 May 2005

All 67 seats to Northumberland County Council 34 seats needed for a majority
- Turnout: 61.0%
	First party	Second party
Party	Labour	Liberal Democrats
Last election	38	9
Seats won	35	14
Seat change	▼3	▲5
Popular vote	51,324	53,509
Percentage	34.4%	35.9%
	Third party	Fourth party
Party	Conservative	Independent
Last election	17	3
Seats won	14	4
Seat change	▼3	▲1
Popular vote	36,081	7,607
Percentage	24.2%	5.1%
- Map of the results of the 2005 local election.
Control of Council before election
Labour Party
Control of Council after election
Labour Party

Local elections to Northumberland County Council, a county council in the north east of England, were held on 5 May 2005, resulting in a council with Labour members forming a majority.

== Results ==
2005 Northumberland County Council election
Party	Seats	Gains	Losses	Net gain/loss	Seats %	Votes %	Votes	+/−
Labour	35					34.4	51,324	
Liberal Democrats	14					36.1	53,509	
Conservative	14					24.3	36,081	
Independent	4					5.1	7,607	
Green	0					0.4	522	
