= 2005 Armagh City and District Council election =

Local govt election in Northern Ireland

- 5 May 2005

All 22 seats to Armagh City and District Council 12 seats needed for a majority
	First party	Second party	Third party
Party	DUP	SDLP	Sinn Féin
Seats won	6	6	5
Seat change	▲2	0	0
	Fourth party
Party	UUP
Seats won	5
Seat change	▼2
- Party with the most votes by district.

Elections to Armagh City and District Council were held on 5 May 2005 on the same day as the other Northern Irish local government elections. The election used four district electoral areas to elect a total of 22 councillors.

== Election results ==
Armagh City and District Council Election Result 2005
Party	Seats	Gains	Losses	Net gain/loss	Seats %	Votes %	Votes	+/−
DUP	6	2	2	▲2	27.3	29.6	7,960	▲4.0
SDLP	6	0	0	0	27.3	21.2	5,705	▼3.2
Sinn Féin	5	0	0	0	22.7	23.1	6,234	▲2.5
UUP	5	0	2	▼2	22.7	22.7	6,122	▼3.2
Independent	0	0	0	0	0.0	3.4	915	▲0.6

Note: "Votes" are the first preference votes.

== Districts summary ==
Results of the Armagh City and District Council election, 2005 by district
Ward	%	Cllrs	%	Cllrs	%	Cllrs	%	Cllrs	%	Cllrs	Total Cllrs
Ward	DUP		SDLP		Sinn Féin		UUP		Others		Total Cllrs
Armagh City	16.0	1	27.6	2	32.3	2	14.8	1	9.3	0	6
Crossmore	15.0	1	33.3	2	38.5	2	13.2	0	0.0	0	5
Cusher	47.7	3	9.8	1	8.1	0	30.3	2	4.1	0	6
The Orchard	33.9	1	17.6	1	18.5	1	30.0	2	0.0	0	5
Total	29.6	6	21.2	6	23.1	5	22.7	5	3.4	0	22

== District results ==
=== Armagh City ===
2001: 2 x Sinn Féin, 2 x SDLP, 1 x DUP, 1 x UUP
2005: 2 x Sinn Féin, 2 x SDLP, 1 x DUP, 1 x UUP
2001-2005 Change: No change

Armagh City - 6 seats
Party	Candidate	FPv%	Count						
Party	Candidate	FPv%	1	2	3	4	5	6	7
DUP	Freda Donnelly*	15.97%	1,004						
SDLP	Pat Brannigan*	14.82%	932						
UUP	Sylvia McRoberts*	14.81%	931						
Sinn Féin	Cathy Rafferty*	14.28%	898	898.22	932.22				
Sinn Féin	Noel Sheridan	10.16%	639	639.22	680.66	1,103.66			
SDLP	Mealla Bratton	7.44%	468	511.78	734.72	754.72	814.72	828.72	854.31
Independent	John Nixon	9.40%	591	618.08	647.5	688.5	782.5	793.5	794.43
Sinn Féin	John Crowley	7.81%	491	491.22	498.22				
SDLP	Michael Carson	5.31%	334	366.78					
Electorate: 9,743 Valid: 6,288 (64.54%) Spoilt: 119 Quota: 899 Turnout: 6,407 (65.76%)

=== Crossmore ===
2001: 2 x Sinn Féin, 2 x SDLP, 1 x UUP
2005: 2 x Sinn Féin, 2 x SDLP, 1 x DUP
2001-2005 Change: DUP gain from UUP

Crossmore - 5 seats
Party	Candidate	FPv%	Count				
Party	Candidate	FPv%	1	2	3	4	5
Sinn Féin	Cathal Boylan	14.09%	864	898	1,374		
SDLP	Thomas O'Hanlon	14.54%	891	982	1,025		
Sinn Féin	Pat O'Rawe*	13.87%	850	876	991	1,332.11	
SDLP	Gerald Mallon	9.87%	605	964	974	981.7	1,031.75
DUP	Noel Donnelly	15.04%	922	923	924	924	925.54
UUP	Billy Morton	13.21%	810	818	819	819	821.31
Sinn Féin	Willie Monaghan	10.49%	643	661			
SDLP	James Lennon	8.89%	545				
Electorate: 8,579 Valid: 6,130 (71.45%) Spoilt: 115 Quota: 1,022 Turnout: 6,245 (72.79%)

=== Cusher ===
2001: 3 x UUP, 2 x DUP, 1 x SDLP
2005: 3 x DUP, 2 x UUP, 1 x SDLP
2001-2005 Change: DUP gain from UUP

Cusher - 6 seats
Party	Candidate	FPv%	Count					
Party	Candidate	FPv%	1	2	3	4	5	6
DUP	Paul Berry*	40.48%	3,263					
UUP	Eric Speers*	16.08%	1,296					
DUP	Margaret Black*	3.09%	249	1,591.25				
SDLP	Sharon Haughey	9.85%	794	801.8	802.85	853.5	855.7	1,300.7
DUP	Gareth Wilson	4.12%	332	749.95	1,060.96	1,131.39	1,138.87	1,138.87
UUP	Robert Turner*	11.14%	898	829.3	867.1	953.32	1,045.17	1,048.17
UUP	James Clayton*	5.58%	450	570.25	625.27	764.32	801.17	807.03
Sinn Féin	Siobhán Vallely	8.13%	655	655	655.21	660.86	660.97	
Independent	Paul Bowbanks	4.02%	324	393.55	408.88			
Electorate: 11,376 Valid: 8,061 (70.86%) Spoilt: 125 Quota: 1,152 Turnout: 8,186 (71.96%)

=== The Orchard ===
2001: 2 x UUP, 1 x DUP, 1 x Sinn Féin, 1 x SDLP
2005: 2 x UUP, 1 x DUP, 1 x Sinn Féin, 1 x SDLP
2001-2005 Change: No change

The Orchard - 5 seats
Party	Candidate	FPv%	Count				
Party	Candidate	FPv%	1	2	3	4	5
DUP	William Irwin	28.02%	1,809				
UUP	Jim Speers*	18.88%	1,219				
Sinn Féin	Paul Corrigan*	18.49%	1,194				
SDLP	John Campbell*	17.59%	1,136				
UUP	Charles Rollston*	11.12%	718	845.1	973.14	1,072.34	1,123
DUP	Robert Steenson	5.90%	381	982.47	995.79	1,013.39	1,018.66
Electorate: 9,140 Valid: 6,457 (70.65%) Spoilt: 95 Quota: 1,077 Turnout: 6,552 (71.68%)
