= List of electoral wards in Oxfordshire =

This is a list of electoral divisions and wards in the ceremonial county of Oxfordshire in South East England. All changes since the re-organisation of local government following the passing of the Local Government Act 1972 are shown. The number of councillors elected for each electoral division or ward is shown in brackets.

== County council ==
=== Oxfordshire ===
Electoral Divisions from 1 April 1974 (first election 12 April 1973) to 2 May 1985:

1. Abingdon No. 1 (Caldecott) (1)
2. Abingdon No. 2 (1)
3. Abingdon No. 3 (1)
4. Banbury No. 1 (1)
5. Banbury No. 2 (1)
6. Banbury No. 3 (Neithrop) (1)
7. Banbury No. 4 (Ruscote) (1)
8. Banbury Rural No. 1 (1)
9. Banbury Rural No. 2 (1)
10. Banbury Rural No. 3 (1)
11. Benson (1)
12. Bicester (1)
13. Chinnor & Tetsworth (1)
14. Chipping Norton (1)
15. Chipping Norton Rural No. 1 (1)
16. Chipping Norton Rural No. 2 (1)
17. Chipping Norton Rural No. 3 (1)
18. Cumnor (1)
19. Didcot (Manor) (1)
20. Didcot (Mereland) (1)
21. Dorchester (1)
22. Drayton (1)
23. Faringdon No. 1 (1)
24. Faringdon No. 2 (1)
25. Great Milton & Wheatley (1)
26. Henley (North) (1)
27. Henley (South) (1)
28. Henley Rural No. 1 (Mapledurham) (1); electoral division abolished in 1977
29. Henley Rural No. 2 (1)
30. Henley Rural No. 3 (1)
31. Henley Rural No. 4 (1); electoral division abolished in 1977
32. Henley Rural No. 5 (1)
33. Hinksey (1)
34. Hormer (1)
35. Littlemore (1)
36. Marcham (1)
37. Moreton (1)
38. Oxford (Blackbird Leys) (1)
39. Oxford (Cherwell) (1)
40. Oxford (Donnington) (1)
41. Oxford (East) (1)
42. Oxford (Headlington) (1)
43. Oxford (Iffley) (1)
44. Oxford (Marston) (1)
45. Oxford (North) (1)
46. Oxford (Quarry) (1)
47. Oxford (South) (1)
48. Oxford (St Clements) (1)
49. Oxford (Temple Cowley) (1)
50. Oxford (West) (1)
51. Oxford (Wolvercote) (1)
52. Oxford (Wood Farm) (1)
53. Ploughley No. 1 (1)
54. Ploughley No. 2 (1)
55. Ploughley No. 3 (1)
56. Ploughley No. 4 (1)
57. Stanton St John (1)
58. Thame (1)
59. Wallingford (1)
60. Wantage (1)
61. Wantage Rural No. 1 (1)
62. Wantage Rural No. 2 (1)
63. Watlington (1)
64. Witney (North) (1)
65. Witney (South) (1)
66. Witney Rural No. 1 (Eynsham & Stand (1)
67. Witney Rural No. 2 (1)
68. Witney Rural No. 3 (1)
69. Witney Rural No. 4 (1)
70. Witney Rural No. 5 (1)
71. Henley Rural No. 1A (1); new electoral division added in 1977

Electoral Divisions from 2 May 1985 to 5 May 2005:

1. Abingdon Central (1)
2. Abingdon North (1)
3. Abingdon South (1)
4. Bampton (1)
5. Banbury Easington (1)
6. Banbury Grimsbury (1)
7. Banbury Hardwick (1)
8. Banbury Neithrop (1)
9. Banbury Ruscote (1)
10. Benson (1)
11. Bicester North (1)
12. Bicester South (1)
13. Blackbird Leys (1)
14. Bloxham (1)
15. Burford (1)
16. Carterton (1)
17. Chalgrove (1)
18. Charlbury (1)
19. Chinnor (1)
20. Chipping Norton (1)
21. Cumnor (1)
22. Deddington (1)
23. Didcot Manor (1)
24. Didcot Mereland (1)
25. Dorchester (1)
26. Drayton (1)
27. Eynsham (1)
28. Faringdon (1)
29. Goring (1)
30. Grove (1)
31. Hanborough (1)
32. Headington (1)
33. Henley North (1)
34. Henley South (1)
35. Hinksey (1)
36. Hormer (1)
37. Iffley (1)
38. Kidlington North (1)
39. Kidlington South (1)
40. Littlemore (1)
41. Marcham (1)
42. Moreton (1)
43. New Marston (1)
44. Old Marston (1)
45. Oxford Central (1)
46. Oxford Cherwell (1)
47. Oxford East (1)
48. Oxford North (1)
49. Oxford South (1)
50. Oxford West (1)
51. Ploughley (1)
52. Quarry (1)
53. Shrivenham (1)
54. Sonning Common (1)
55. St Clements (1)
56. Temple Cowley (1)
57. Thame (1)
58. Wallingford (1)
59. Wantage (1)
60. Wantage Rural (1)
61. Watlington (1)
62. Wheatley (1)
63. Witney North (1)
64. Witney South (1)
65. Wolvercote (1)
66. Wood Farm (1)
67. Woodstock (1)
68. Wroxton (1)
69. Wychwood (1)
70. Yarnton & Otmoor (1)

Electoral Divisions from 5 May 2005 to 2 May 2013:

1. Abingdon East (1)
2. Abingdon North (1)
3. Abingdon West (2)
4. Bampton (1)
5. Banbury Easington (1)
6. Banbury Grimsbury & Castle (1)
7. Banbury Hardwick (1)
8. Banbury Neithrop (1)
9. Banbury Ruscote (1)
10. Barton & Churchill (2)
11. Benson (1)
12. Bicester (3)
13. Bicester South (1)
14. Bloxham (1)
15. Burford & Carterton North East (1)
16. Carterton South West (1)
17. Chalgrove (1)
18. Charlbury (1)
19. Chipping Norton (1)
20. Cowley & Littlemore (2)
21. Deddington (1)
22. Didcot Ladygrove (1)
23. Didcot South (2)
24. Dorchester & Berinsfield (1)
25. East Oxford (2)
26. Eynsham (1)
27. Faringdon (1)
28. Goring (1)
29. Grove & Wantage (2)
30. Hanborough (1)
31. Hanneys & Hendreds (1)
32. Headington & Marston (2)
33. Henley North & Chilterns (1)
34. Henley South (1)
35. Isis (2)
36. Kennington & Radley (1)
37. Kidlington & Yarnton (2)
38. Kingston Bagpuize (1)
39. Leys & Lye (2)
40. Moreton (1)
41. North Hinksey & Wytham (1)
42. Otmoor & Kirtlington (1)
43. Ploughley (1)
44. Shrivenham (1)
45. Sonning Common (1)
46. Summertown & Wolvercote (2)
47. Sutton Courtenay & Harwell (1)
48. Thame & Chinnor (2)
49. Wallingford (1)
50. Watlington (1)
51. West Central Oxford (2)
52. Wheatley (1)
53. Witney East (1)
54. Witney West (2)
55. Woodstock (1)
56. Wootton (1)
57. Wroxton (1)
58. Wychwood (1)

Electoral Divisions from 2 May 2013 to 1 May 2025:

1. Abingdon East (1)
2. Abingdon North (1)
3. Abingdon South (1)
4. Banbury Calthorpe (1)
5. Banbury Grimsbury & Castle (1)
6. Banbury Hardwick (1)
7. Banbury Ruscote (1)
8. Barton, Sandhills & Risinghurst (1)
9. Benson & Cholsey (1)
10. Berinsfield & Garsington (1)
11. Bicester North (1)
12. Bicester Town (1)
13. Bicester West (1)
14. Bloxham & Easington (1)
15. Burford & Carterton North (1)
16. Carterton South & West (1)
17. Chalgrove & Watlington (1)
18. Charlbury & Wychwood (1)
19. Chipping Norton (1)
20. Churchill & Lye Valley (1)
21. Cowley (1)
22. Deddington (1)
23. Didcot East & Hagbourne (1)
24. Didcot Ladygrove (1)
25. Didcot West (1)
26. Eynsham (1)
27. Faringdon (1)
28. Goring (1)
29. Grove & Wantage (2)
30. Hanborough & Minster Lovell (1)
31. Headington & Quarry (1)
32. Hendreds & Harwell (1)
33. Henley-on-Thames (1)
34. Iffley Fields & St Mary’s (1)
35. Isis (1)
36. Jericho & Osney (1)
37. Kennington & Radley (1)
38. Kidlington South (1)
39. Kingston & Cumnor (1)
40. Kirtlington & Kidlington North (1)
41. Leys (1)
42. Marston & Northway (1)
43. North Hinksey (1)
44. Otmoor (1)
45. Ploughley (1)
46. Rose Hill & Littlemore (1)
47. Shrivenham (1)
48. Sonning Common (1)
49. St Clement’s & Cowley Marsh (1)
50. St Margaret’s (1)
51. Sutton Courtenay & Marcham (1)
52. Thame & Chinnor (2)
53. University Parks (1)
54. Wallingford (1)
55. Wheatley (1)
56. Witney North & East (1)
57. Witney South & Central (1)
58. Witney West & Bampton (1)
59. Wolvercote & Summertown (1)
60. Woodstock (1)
61. Wroxton & Hook Norton (1)

Electoral Divisions from 1 May 2025 to present:

1. Abingdon East (1)
2. Abingdon North (1)
3. Abingdon South (1)
4. Adderbury, Bloxham & Bodicote (1)
5. Bampton & Carterton South (1)
6. Banbury Calthorpe (1)
7. Banbury Easington (1)
8. Banbury Grimsbury & Castle (1)
9. Banbury Hardwick (1)
10. Banbury Ruscote (1)
11. Bartlemas (1)
12. Barton, Sandhills & Risinghurst (1)
13. Benson & Crowmarsh (1)
14. Berinsfield & Garsington (1)
15. Bicester East (1)
16. Bicester North (1)
17. Bicester South (1)
18. Bicester West (1)
19. Brize Norton & Carterton East (1)
20. Burford & Carterton West (1)
21. Chalgrove & Thame West (1)
22. Charlbury & Wychwood (1)
23. Charlton, Ardington & Hendreds (1)
24. Chesterton & Launton (1)
25. Chinnor (1)
26. Chipping Norton (1)
27. Cholsey & The Hagbournes (1)
28. Churchill & Lye Valley (1)
29. Cowley (1)
30. Cropredy & Hook Norton (1)
31. Deddington (1)
32. Didcot Ladygrove (1)
33. Didcot South (1)
34. Didcot West (1)
35. Drayton, Sutton Courtenay & Steventon (1)
36. Eynsham (1)
37. Faringdon (1)
38. Goring & Woodcote (1)
39. Grove (1)
40. Hanborough & Hailey (1)
41. Harwell, Western Valley & Blewbury (1)
42. Headington & Quarry (1)
43. Henley (1)
44. Isis (1)
45. Jericho & Osney (1)
46. Kennington & Radley (1)
47. Kidlington East (1)
48. Kidlington North & Otmoor (1)
49. Kidlington West (1)
50. Kingston & Stanford (1)
51. Leys (1)
52. Marcham & Cumnor (1)
53. Marston & Northway (1)
54. North Hinksey (1)
55. Parks (1)
56. Rose Hill & Littlemore (1)
57. Shrivenham (1)
58. Sonning Common & Henley South (1)
59. Summertown & Walton Manor (1)
60. Thame (1)
61. Wallingford (1)
62. Wantage West (1)
63. Watlington & Rotherfield (1)
64. Wheatley (1)
65. Witney North & East (1)
66. Witney South & Central (1)
67. Witney West & Ducklington (1)
68. Wolvercote & Cutteslowe (1)
69. Woodstock (1)

== District councils ==
=== Cherwell ===
Wards from 1 April 1974 (first election 7 June 1973) to 3 May 1979:

Wards from 3 May 1979 to 2 May 2002:

Wards from 2 May 2002 to 5 May 2016:

1. Adderbury (1)
2. Ambrosden & Chesterton (1)
3. Banbury Calthorpe (2)
4. Banbury Easington (3)
5. Banbury Grimsbury & Castle (3)
6. Banbury Hardwick (3)
7. Banbury Neithrop (2)
8. Banbury Ruscote (3)
9. Bicester East (2)
10. Bicester North (2)
11. Bicester South (2)
12. Bicester Town (2)
13. Bicester West (3)
14. Bloxham & Bodicote (2)
15. Caversfield (1)
16. Cropredy (1)
17. Deddington (1)
18. Fringford (1)
19. Hook Norton (1)
20. Kidlington North (2)
21. Kidlington South (3)
22. Kirtlington (1)
23. Launton (1)
24. Otmoor (1)
25. Sibford (1)
26. The Astons & Heyfords (2)
27. Wroxton (1)
28. Yarnton, Gosford & Water Eaton (2)

Wards from 5 May 2016 to present:

1. Adderbury, Bloxham & Bodicote (3)
2. Banbury Calthorpe & Easington (3)
3. Banbury Cross & Neithrop (3)
4. Banbury Grimsbury & Hightown (3)
5. Banbury Hardwick (3)
6. Banbury Ruscote (3)
7. Bicester East (3)
8. Bicester North & Caversfield (3)
9. Bicester South & Ambrosden (3)
10. Bicester West (3)
11. Cropredy, Sibfords & Wroxton (3)
12. Deddington (3)
13. Fringford & Heyfords (3)
14. Kidlington East (3)
15. Kidlington West (3)
16. Launton & Otmoor (3)

=== Oxford ===
Wards from 1 April 1974 (first election 7 June 1973) to 3 May 1979:

Wards from 3 May 1979 to 2 May 2002:

1. Littlemore (3); new ward added in 1991
2. Old Marston & Risinghurst (3); new ward added in 1991

Wards from 2 May 2002 to 6 May 2021:

1. Barton & Sandhills (2)
2. Blackbird Leys (2)
3. Carfax (2)
4. Churchill (2)
5. Cowley (2)
6. Cowley Marsh (2)
7. Headington (2)
8. Headington Hill & Northway (2)
9. Hinksey Park (2)
10. Holywell (2)
11. Iffley Fields (2)
12. Jericho & Osney (2)
13. Littlemore (2)
14. Lye Valley (2)
15. Marston (2)
16. North (2)
17. Northfield Brook (2)
18. Quarry & Risinghurst (2)
19. Rose Hill & Iffley (2)
20. St Clement's (2)
21. St Margaret's (2)
22. St Mary's (2)
23. Summertown (2)
24. Wolvercote (2)

Wards from 6 May 2021 to present:

1. Barton & Sandhills (2)
2. Blackbird Leys (2)
3. Carfax & Jericho (2)
4. Churchill (2)
5. Cowley (2)
6. Cutteslowe & Sunnymead (2)
7. Donnington (2)
8. Headington (2)
9. Headington Hill & Northway (2)
10. Hinksey Park (2)
11. Holywell (2)
12. Littlemore (2)
13. Lye Valley (2)
14. Marston (2)
15. Northfield Brook (2)
16. Osney & St Thomas (2)
17. Quarry & Risinghurst (2)
18. Rose Hill & Iffley (2)
19. St Clement's (2)
20. St Mary's (2)
21. Summertown (2)
22. Temple Cowley (2)
23. Walton Manor (2)
24. Wolvercote (2)

=== South Oxfordshire ===
Wards from 1 April 1974 (first election 7 June 1973) to 5 May 1983:

1. No. 22 (); ward abolished in 1977
2. No. 23 (); changed to (1) in 1977
3. No. 27 (); ward abolished in 1977
4. No. 28 (); ward abolished in 1977
5. No. 22A (1); new ward added in 1977

Wards from 5 May 1983 to 1 May 2003:

1. Littlemore (); ward abolished in 1991
2. Marston (); ward abolished in 1991
3. Risinghurst (); ward abolished in 1991
4. Horspath (1); new ward added in 1991

Wards from 1 May 2003 to 7 May 2015:

1. Aston Rowant (1)
2. Benson (2)
3. Berinsfield (2)
4. Brightwell (1)
5. Chalgrove (1)
6. Chiltern Woods (1)
7. Chinnor (2)
8. Cholsey & Wallingford South (2)
9. Crowmarsh (1)
10. Didcot All Saints (2)
11. Didcot Ladygrove (3)
12. Didcot Northbourne (2)
13. Didcot Park (2)
14. Forest Hill & Holton (1)
15. Garsington (1)
16. Goring (2)
17. Great Milton (1)
18. Hagbourne (1)
19. Henley North (2)
20. Henley South (2)
21. Sandford (1)
22. Shiplake (2)
23. Sonning Common (2)
24. Thame North (2)
25. Thame South (2)
26. Wallingford North (2)
27. Watlington (2)
28. Wheatley (2)
29. Woodcote (1)

Wards from 7 May 2015 to present:

1. Benson & Crowmarsh (2)
2. Berinsfield (1)
3. Chalgrove (1)
4. Chinnor (2)
5. Cholsey (2)
6. Didcot North East (3)
7. Didcot South (3)
8. Didcot West (2)
9. Forest Hill & Holton (1)
10. Garsington & Horspath (1)
11. Goring (1)
12. Haseley Brook (1)
13. Henley-on-Thames (3)
14. Kidmore End & Whitchurch (1)
15. Sandford & the Wittenhams (1)
16. Sonning Common (2)
17. Thame (3)
18. Wallingford (2)
19. Watlington (1)
20. Wheatley (1)
21. Woodcote & Rotherfield (2)

=== Vale of White Horse ===
Wards from 1 April 1974 (first election 7 June 1973) to 3 May 1979:

Wards from 3 May 1979 to 1 May 2003:

Wards from 1 May 2003 to 7 May 2015:

1. Abingdon Abbey & Barton (2)
2. Abingdon Caldecott (2)
3. Abingdon Dunmore (2)
4. Abingdon Fitzharris (2)
5. Abingdon Northcourt (2)
6. Abingdon Ock Meadow (2)
7. Abingdon Peachcroft (2)
8. Appleton & Cumnor (3)
9. Blewbury & Upton (1)
10. Craven (1)
11. Drayton (1)
12. Faringdon & The Coxwells (3)
13. Greendown (1)
14. Grove (3)
15. Hanneys (1)
16. Harwell (2)
17. Hendreds (2)
18. Kennington & South Hinksey (2)
19. Kingston Bagpuize with Southmoor (1)
20. Longworth (1)
21. Marcham & Shippon (1)
22. North Hinksey & Wytham (2)
23. Radley (1)
24. Shrivenham (2)
25. Stanford (1)
26. Sunningwell & Wootton (2)
27. Sutton Courtenay & Appleford (1)
28. Wantage Charlton (3)
29. Wantage Segsbury (2)

Wards from 7 May 2015 to present:

1. Abingdon Abbey Northcourt (2)
2. Abingdon Caldecott (2)
3. Abingdon Dunmore (2)
4. Abingdon Fitzharris (2)
5. Abingdon Peachcroft (2)
6. Blewbury & Harwell (2)
7. Botley & Sunningwell (2)
8. Cumnor (2)
9. Drayton (1)
10. Faringdon (2)
11. Grove North (2)
12. Hendreds (1)
13. Kennington & Radley (2)
14. Kingston Bagpuize (1)
15. Marcham (1)
16. Ridgeway (1)
17. Stanford (1)
18. Steventon & the Hanneys (1)
19. Sutton Courtenay (1)
20. Thames (1)
21. Wantage & Grove Brook (2)
22. Wantage Charlton (2)
23. Watchfield & Shrivenham (2)
24. Wootton (1)

=== West Oxfordshire ===
Wards from 1 April 1974 (first election 7 June 1973) to 3 May 1979:

Wards from 3 May 1979 to 2 May 2002:

Wards from 2 May 2002 to present:

1. Alvescot & Filkins (1)
2. Ascott & Shipton (1)
3. Bampton & Clanfield (2)
4. Brize Norton & Shilton (1) †
5. Burford (1) †
6. Carterton North East (2)
7. Carterton North West (2) †
8. Carterton South (2)
9. Chadlington & Churchill (1) ‡
10. Charlbury & Finstock (2) ‡
11. Chipping Norton (3)
12. Ducklington (1)
13. Eynsham & Cassington (3)
14. Freeland & Hanborough (2)
15. Hailey, Minster Lovell & Leafield (2) †‡
16. Kingham, Rollright & Enstone (2)
17. Milton-under-Wychwood (1)
18. North Leigh (1)
19. Standlake, Aston & Stanton Harcourt (2)
20. Stonesfield & Tackley (2)
21. The Bartons (1)
22. Witney Central (2)
23. Witney East (3)
24. Witney North (2)
25. Witney South (3)
26. Witney West (2)
27. Woodstock & Bladon (2)

† minor boundary changes in 2014 ‡ minor boundary changes in 2016

== Electoral wards by constituency ==
Wards as they existed on 1 December 2020.

=== Banbury ===
Cherwell: Adderbury, Bloxham & Bodicote; Banbury, Calthorpe & Easington; Banbury Cross & Neithrop; Banbury Grimsbury & Hightown; Banbury Hardwick; Banbury Ruscote; Cropredy, Sibfords & Wroxton; Deddington.

West Oxfordshire: Chadlington & Churchill; Charlbury & Finstock; Chipping Norton; Kingham, Rollright & Enstone; The Bartons.

=== Bicester and Woodstock ===
Cherwell: Bicester East; Bicester North & Caversfield; Bicester South & Ambrosden; Bicester West; Fringford & Heyfords; Kidlington East; Kidlington West; Launton & Otmoor.

West Oxfordshire: Eynsham & Cassington; Freeland & Hanborough; North Leigh; Stonesfield & Tackley; Woodstock & Bladon.

=== Didcot and Wantage ===
South Oxfordshire: Cholsey; Didcot North East; Didcot South; Didcot West; Sandford & the Wittenhams; Wallingford.

Vale of White Horse: Blewbury & Harwell; Drayton; Grove North; Hendreds; Ridgeway; Stanford; Steventon & the Hanneys; Sutton Courtenay; Wantage & Grove Brook; Wantage Charlton.

=== Henley and Thame ===
South Oxfordshire: Benson & Crowmarsh; Berinsfield; Chalgrove; Chinnor; Forest Hill & Holton; Garsington & Horspath; Goring; Haseley Brook; Henley-on-Thames; Kidmore End & Whitchurch; Sonning Common; Thame; Watlington; Wheatley; Woodcote & Rotherfield.

=== Oxford East ===
Oxford: Barton & Sandhills; Blackbird Leys; Churchill; Cowley; Donnington; Headington; Headington Hill & Northway; Hinksey Park; Littlemore; Lye Valley; Marston; Northfield Brook; Quarry & Risinghurst; Rose Hill & Iffley; St. Clement’s; St. Mary’s; Temple Cowley.

=== Oxford West and Abingdon ===
Oxford: Carfax & Jericho; Cutteslowe & Sunnymead; Holywell; Osney & St. Thomas; Summertown; Walton Manor; Wolvercote.

Vale of White Horse: Abingdon Abbey Northcourt; Abingdon Caldecott; Abingdon Dunmore; Abingdon Fitzharris; Abingdon Peachcroft; Botley & Sunningwell; Cumnor; Kennington & Radley; Marcham; Wootton.

=== Witney ===
Vale of White Horse: Faringdon; Kingston Bagpuize; Thames; Watchfield & Shrivenham.

West Oxfordshire: Alvescot & Filkins; Ascott & Shipton; Bampton & Clanfield; Brize Norton & Shilton; Burford; Carterton North East; Carterton North West; Carterton South; Ducklington; Hailey, Minster Lovell & Leafield; Milton-under-Wychwood; Standlake, Aston & Stanton Harcourt; Witney Central; Witney East; Witney North; Witney South; Witney West.

== See also ==
- List of parliamentary constituencies in Oxfordshire
