= 2005 Nottinghamshire County Council election =

2005 UK local government election

← 2001	5 May 2005	2009 →

All 67 seats to Nottinghamshire County Council 34 seats needed for a majority
- Turnout: 62% (▲+1.5)
	First party	Second party	Third party
Party	Labour	Conservative	Liberal Democrats
Seats won	38	25	4
Popular vote	134,152	117,598	60,788
Percentage	37.5%	32.9%	17.0%
Swing	▼-6.7	▼-3.2	▲+2.3
- Map of the results of the election in each division. Colours denote the winning party, as shown in the main table of results.
Council control before election
Labour
Council control after election
Labour

The 2005 Nottinghamshire County Council election was held on Thursday, 5 May 2005, the same day as the 2005 UK General Election. The whole council was up for election and the Labour Party retained control of the council.

Boundary changes to the electoral divisions took effect at this election, with the number of seats increased by four.

== Overall election results ==
Political composition of the council following the election

Overall Turnout
Registered electors	567,217
Votes cast	351,848
Turnout	62.0% (▲+1.5)

2005 Nottinghamshire County Council election
Party	Candidates	Seats	Gains	Losses	Net gain/loss	Seats %	Votes %	Votes	+/−
Labour	66	38					37.5	134,152	▼-6.7
Conservative	57	25					32.9	117,598	▼-3.2
Liberal Democrats	46	4					17.0	60,788	▲+2.3
Independent	33	0					9.0	32,030	▲+5.2
Green	20	0					2.9	10,294	▲+1.7
BNP	2	0					0.3	1,093	▲+0.2
Ashfield Ind.	1	0					0.3	985	NEW
UKIP	1	0					0.1	531	NEW
Veritas	1	0					0.1	149	NEW

== Results by District ==
Each electoral division returned either one, two or three county councillors.

=== Ashfield ===
(10 seats, 8 electoral divisions)

Ashfield District
Party	Candidates						Votes		
Party	Stood	Elected	Gained	Unseated	Net	% of total	%	No.	Net %
Labour	10	10					45.9	22,556	▼-11.9
Independent	11	0					18.9	9,277	▲+7.9
Conservative	6	0					15.0	7,396	▼-12.6
Liberal Democrats	7	0					11.8	5,805	NEW
Green	8	0					6.4	3,132	▲+3.6
Ashfield Ind.	1	0					2.0	985	NEW

Ashfield Turnout
Registered electors	82,960
Votes cast	48,391
Turnout	58.3% (▲+5.0)

==== Hucknall ====
Hucknall (3 seats)
Party	Candidate	Votes	%
Labour	Dave Shaw	6,619	52.8
Labour	Chris Baron (inc)*	6,576	52.5
Labour	Nellie Smedley (inc)✝	6,566	52.4
Conservative	G Riley	4,278	34.1
Conservative	S Robbins	4,125	32.9
Conservative	B Andrews	3,824	30.5
Green	S Boffey	1,540	12.3
Green	A Hilton	1,320	10.5
Green	D Lowe	1,149	9.2
Independent	T Goodall	854	6.8
Independent	Robert Sears-Piccavey	742	5.9
Turnout		12,531	54.5
Registered electors		23,010	
Labour win (new seat)			
Labour win (new seat)			
Labour win (new seat)			

* Incumbent councillor for Hucknall East division prior to boundary changes. ✝ Incumbent councillor for Hucknall West division prior to boundary changes.

==== Kirkby in Ashfield North ====
Kirkby in Ashfield North
Party	Candidate	Votes	%
Labour	John Knight	1,897	36.7
Independent	J Baird	1,423	27.5
Independent	Wendy Harvey	1,083	20.9
Liberal Democrats	Austin Raithe	771	14.9
Turnout		5,174	53.4
Registered electors		9,695	
Labour win (new boundaries)			

==== Kirkby in Ashfield South ====
Kirkby in Ashfield South
Party	Candidate	Votes	%
Labour	Yvonne Davidson (inc)	2,457	39.3
Independent	Rachel Madden	1,230	19.7
Ashfield Ind.	T Brown	985	15.7
Liberal Democrats	T Theaker	948	15.2
Green	M Harrison	634	10.1
Turnout		6,254	60.3
Registered electors		10,376	
Labour win (new boundaries)			

==== Selston ====
Selston
Party	Candidate	Votes	%
Labour	Joan Taylor (inc)	2,523	43.4
Independent	Gail Turner	2,272	39.1
Liberal Democrats	B Charlesworth	1,013	17.4
Turnout		5,808	58.7
Registered electors		9,893	
Labour win (new boundaries)			

==== Sutton in Ashfield Central ====
Sutton in Ashfield Central
Party	Candidate	Votes	%
Labour	Edward Llewellyn-Jones (inc)	2,301	51.0
Conservative	Christine Vernon	860	19.1
Liberal Democrats	L Bradshaw	731	16.2
Independent	J Ross	316	7.0
Independent	C Perry	153	3.4
Green	A Finlayson	151	3.3
Turnout		4,512	53.5
Registered electors		8,433	
Labour win (new boundaries)			

==== Sutton in Ashfield East ====
Sutton in Ashfield East
Party	Candidate	Votes	%
Labour	Steve Carroll (inc)	2,364	52.6
Liberal Democrats	L Mullaney	1,034	23.0
Independent	C Madin	768	17.1
Green	C Davenport	326	7.3
Turnout		4,492	53.8
Registered electors		8,342	
Labour win (new boundaries)			

==== Sutton in Ashfield North ====
Sutton in Ashfield North
Party	Candidate	Votes	%
Labour	Dick Anthony (inc)	2,105	44.8
Conservative	J Baker	1,118	23.8
Liberal Democrats	P Birkitt	654	13.9
Independent	P Thorpe	598	12.7
Green	F Keen	223	4.7
Turnout		4,698	56.8
Registered electors		8,278	
Labour win (new boundaries)			

==== Sutton in Ashfield West ====
Sutton in Ashfield West
Party	Candidate	Votes	%
Labour	David Kirkham (inc)	2,290	46.5
Conservative	S Lyons	1,140	23.2
Liberal Democrats	A Fell	654	13.3
Independent	H Greasley	580	11.8
Green	K Bradford	258	5.2
Turnout		4,922	57.4
Registered electors		8,572	
Labour win (new boundaries)			

=== Bassetlaw ===
(9 seats, 9 electoral divisions)

Bassetlaw District
Party	Candidates						Votes		
Party	Stood	Elected	Gained	Unseated	Net	% of total	%	No.	Net %
Labour	9	7					49.2	23,607	▼-0.8
Conservative	7	2					37.4	17,977	▼-1.2
Independent	5	0					13.4	6,432	▲+12.4

Bassetlaw Turnout
Registered electors	82,572
Votes cast	48,016
Turnout	58.2% (▲+0.2)

==== Blyth and Harworth ====
Blyth and Harworth
Party	Candidate	Votes	%
Labour	Sheila Place (inc)	2,612	52.7
Independent	David Challinor	2,342	47.3
Turnout		4,954	53.7
Registered electors		9,226	
Labour win (new boundaries)			

==== Misterton ====
Misterton
Party	Candidate	Votes	%
Conservative	Kenneth Bullivant (inc)	4,172	62.5
Labour	Rory Palmer	2,501	37.5
Turnout		6,673	64.7
Registered electors		10,306	
Conservative win (new boundaries)			

==== Retford East ====
Retford East
Party	Candidate	Votes	%
Labour	Mick Storey (inc)*	2,675	52.3
Conservative	Michael Quigley	2,438	47.7
Turnout		5,113	60.0
Registered electors		8,522	
Labour win (new seat)			

* Incumbent councillor for Retford South division prior to boundary changes.

==== Retford West ====
Retford West
Party	Candidate	Votes	%
Labour	James Napier (inc)*	2,343	52.9
Conservative	J Bush	2,090	47.1
Turnout		4,433	56.6
Registered electors		7,831	
Labour win (new seat)			

* Incumbent councillor for Retford North division prior to boundary changes.

==== Tuxford ====
Tuxford
Party	Candidate	Votes	%
Conservative	John Hempsall (inc)	4,120	62.7
Labour	Pamela Skelding	2,449	37.3
Turnout		6,569	65.4
Registered electors		10,051	
Conservative win (new boundaries)			

==== Worksop East ====
Worksop East
Party	Candidate	Votes	%
Labour	Glynn Gilfoyle (inc)	2,983	62.6
Independent	Geoff Coe	1,779	37.4
Turnout		4,762	52.0
Registered electors		9,165	
Labour win (new boundaries)			

==== Worksop North ====
Worksop North
Party	Candidate	Votes	%
Labour	Sybil Fielding	2,855	53.1
Conservative	Barry Bowles	1,465	27.3
Independent	R Barsley	1,056	19.6
Turnout		5,376	54.7
Registered electors		9,827	
Labour win (new seat)			

==== Worksop North East and Carlton ====
Worksop North East and Carlton
Party	Candidate	Votes	%
Labour	Alan Rhodes	2,913	51.9
Conservative	Val Bowles	1,989	35.5
Independent	A Barsley	708	12.6
Turnout		5,610	59.9
Registered electors		9,363	
Labour win (new seat)			

==== Worksop West ====
Worksop West
Party	Candidate	Votes	%
Labour	Alan Davison (inc)	2,276	50.3
Conservative	Chris Wanless	1,703	37.6
Independent	J Payne	547	12.1
Turnout		4,526	54.7
Registered electors		8,281	
Labour win (new boundaries)			

=== Broxtowe ===
(10 seats, 8 electoral divisions)

Broxtowe District
Party	Candidates						Votes		
Party	Stood	Elected	Gained	Unseated	Net	% of total	%	No.	Net %
Conservative	10	4					31.0	16,626	▼-2.4
Liberal Democrats	10	4					26.0	13,910	▲+3.2
Labour	10	2					34.5	18,501	▼-6.3
Independent	4	0					3.6	1,953	▲+2.6
Green	4	0					3.6	1,938	▲+1.6
BNP	1	0					0.9	509	NEW
Veritas	1	0					0.3	149	NEW

Broxtowe Turnout
Registered electors	81,258
Votes cast	54,247
Turnout	66.8% (▲+2.0)

==== Beauvale ====
Beauvale
Party	Candidate	Votes	%
Conservative	David Taylor (inc)*	2,100	38.4
Labour	D Ryan	2,083	38.1
Liberal Democrats	P Fell	771	14.1
BNP	S Graham	509	9.3
Turnout		5,463	67.5
Registered electors		8,091	
Conservative win (new seat)			

* Incumbent councillor for Greasley and Nuthall division prior to boundary changes.

==== Beeston North ====
Beeston North
Party	Candidate	Votes	%
Liberal Democrats	Steve Carr	1,942	37.7
Labour	S Barber	1,703	33.0
Conservative	Philip Hopkinson	1,144	22.2
Green	S Rule	290	5.6
Independent	M Tewson	78	1.5
Turnout		5,157	68.6
Registered electors		7,519	
Liberal Democrats win (new boundaries)			

==== Beeston South and Attenborough ====
Beeston South and Attenborough
Party	Candidate	Votes	%
Labour	Pat Lally	2,363	39.6
Conservative	Eric Kerry	1,884	31.6
Liberal Democrats	C Wombwell	1,218	20.4
Green	P Anderson	390	6.5
Independent	A Buttery	106	1.8
Turnout		5,961	66.1
Registered electors		9,012	
Labour win (new seat)			

==== Bramcote and Stapleford ====
Bramcote and Stapleford
Party	Candidate	Votes	%
Liberal Democrats	Stan Heptinstall (inc)*	4,841	42.1
Liberal Democrats	Brian Wombwell	4,541	39.5
Labour	Geoff Ward	3,221	28.0
Labour	John Bell (inc)✝	3,013	26.2
Conservative	S Tonks	2,759	24.0
Conservative	E Atherton	2,605	22.7
Green	Mary Venning	609	5.3
Turnout		11,498	67.6
Registered electors		17,010	
Liberal Democrats win (new seat)			
Liberal Democrats win (new seat)			

* Incumbent councillor for Bramcote and Stapleford East division prior to boundary changes. ✝ Incumbent councillor for Stapleford North & West division prior to boundary changes.

==== Chilwell and Toton ====
Chilwell and Toton
Party	Candidate	Votes	%
Conservative	Tom Pettengell (inc)*	3,971	37.8
Conservative	Richard Jackson	3,920	37.3
Labour	M Garrett	3,646	34.7
Labour	A Howlett	3,160	30.1
Liberal Democrats	M Rich	1,653	15.7
Liberal Democrats	J Williams	1,639	15.6
Green	R Eddleston	649	6.2
Turnout		10,512	68.6
Registered electors		15,325	
Conservative win (new seat)			
Conservative win (new seat)			

* Incumbent councillor for Toton and Attenborough division prior to boundary changes.

==== Eastwood ====
Eastwood
Party	Candidate	Votes	%
Labour	Ellie Lodziak (inc)	2,225	47.5
Conservative	T Spencer	1,002	21.4
Liberal Democrats	E Birkitt	792	16.9
Independent	C Robb	661	14.1
Turnout		4,680	58.3
Registered electors		8,024	
Labour win (new seat)			

==== Kimberley and Trowell ====
Kimberley and Trowell
Party	Candidate	Votes	%
Liberal Democrats	Ken Rigby	2,202	37.3
Labour	M Clarke	1,885	31.9
Conservative	L Ball	1,821	30.8
Turnout		5,908	66.8
Registered electors		8,842	
Liberal Democrats win (new boundaries)			

==== Nuthall ====
Nuthall
Party	Candidate	Votes	%
Conservative	Philip Owen	1,945	38.4
Labour	J Pearce	1,375	27.1
Independent	Sue Wildey	1,108	21.9
Liberal Democrats	W Longdon	491	9.7
Veritas	G Green	149	2.9
Turnout		5,068	68.2
Registered electors		7,435	
Conservative win (new seat)			

=== Gedling ===
(10 seats, 6 electoral divisions)

Gedling District
Party	Candidates						Votes		
Party	Stood	Elected	Gained	Unseated	Net	% of total	%	No.	Net %
Labour	10	7					40.1	22,235	▼-2.8
Conservative	10	3					40.0	22,169	▲+0.4
Liberal Democrats	8	0					17.8	9,887	▲+4.4
BNP	1	0					1.1	584	NEW
UKIP	1	0					1.0	531	NEW

Gedling Turnout
Registered electors	86,806
Votes cast	53,326
Turnout	61.4% (▼-1.6)

==== Arnold North ====
Arnold North
Party	Candidate	Votes	%
Labour	Jennifer Cole	4,991	45.6
Labour	John Stocks (inc)*	4,334	39.6
Conservative	Veronica Pepper (inc)✝	4,289	39.2
Conservative	Gerald Clarke	4,279	39.1
Liberal Democrats	M Swift	1,974	18.0
Liberal Democrats	A Sowter	1,963	17.9
Turnout		10,940	59.1
Registered electors		18,511	
Labour win (new seat)			
Labour win (new seat)			

* Incumbent councillor for Calverton division prior to boundary changes. ✝ Incumbent councillor for Arnold East division prior to boundary changes.

==== Arnold South ====
Arnold South
Party	Candidate	Votes	%
Conservative	Rod Kempster (inc)*	5,049	43.1
Labour	Peter Barnes	4,769	40.8
Conservative	Mel Shepherd	4,480	38.3
Labour	J Truscott	4,129	35.3
Liberal Democrats	A Swift	2,249	19.2
Liberal Democrats	R Dawson	2,131	18.2
UKIP	P Foulkes	531	4.5
Turnout		11,702	64.4
Registered electors		18,172	
Conservative win (new seat)			
Labour win (new seat)			

* Incumbent councillor for Arnold Central division prior to boundary changes.

==== Calverton ====
Calverton
Party	Candidate	Votes	%
Conservative	Mark Spencer	2,799	55.4
Labour	James Woodward (inc)*	2,250	44.6
Turnout		5,049	63.8
Registered electors		7,911	
Conservative win (new boundaries)			

* Incumbent councillor for Arnold West division prior to boundary changes.

==== Carlton East ====
Carlton East
Party	Candidate	Votes	%
Labour	John Clarke (inc)*	4,000	38.9
Labour	James O'Riordan	3,721	36.1
Liberal Democrats	Richard Berry	3,378	32.8
Conservative	P Blandamer	3,338	32.4
Conservative	T Butcher	3,225	31.3
Liberal Democrats	C Pratt	3,070	29.8
Turnout		10,296	60.4
Registered electors		17,047	
Labour win (new boundaries)			
Labour win (new boundaries)			

* Incumbent councillor for Carlton South division prior to boundary changes.

==== Carlton West ====
Carlton West
Party	Candidate	Votes	%
Labour	Jim Creamer	4,382	43.1
Labour	Darrell Pulk (inc)	4,200	41.3
Conservative	E Collin	3,375	33.2
Conservative	E Goodwin	3,330	32.7
Liberal Democrats	A Dunkin	2,286	22.5
Liberal Democrats	P Hughes	2,166	21.3
BNP	B Wheeldon	584	5.7
Turnout		10,177	58.4
Registered electors		17,428	
Labour win (new boundaries)			
Labour win (new boundaries)			

==== Newstead ====
Newstead
Party	Candidate	Votes	%
Conservative	Joe Lonergan (inc)	3,319	64.3
Labour	Leoni Mathers	1,843	35.7
Turnout		5,162	66.7
Registered electors		7,737	
Conservative win (new boundaries)			

=== Mansfield ===
(9 seats, 5 electoral divisions)

Mansfield District
Party	Candidates						Votes		
Party	Stood	Elected	Gained	Unseated	Net	% of total	%	No.	Net %
Labour	9	9					39.3	18,560	▼-13.7
Independent	8	0					22.0	10,398	▲+16.6
Conservative	7	0					16.7	7,868	▼-10.0
Liberal Democrats	5	0					15.4	7,253	▲+3.3
Green	4	0					6.6	3,126	▲+3.9

Mansfield Turnout
Registered electors	77,569
Votes cast	43,406
Turnout	56.0% (▲+1.2)

==== Mansfield East ====
Mansfield East
Party	Candidate	Votes	%
Labour	G Kane	3,997	40.9
Labour	Chris Winterton (inc)*	2,854	29.2
Independent	D Etches	2,461	25.2
Conservative	Brian Marshall	2,132	21.8
Liberal Democrats	R Heywood	1,976	20.2
Conservative	N Ward	1,828	18.7
Green	P Frost	1,019	10.4
Turnout		9,764	56.0
Registered electors		17,436	
Labour win (new seat)			
Labour win (new seat)			

* Incumbent councillor for Titchfield and Eakring division prior to boundary changes.

==== Mansfield North ====
Mansfield North
Party	Candidate	Votes	%
Labour	Joyce Bosnjak (inc)*	3,900	40.5
Labour	Parry Tsimbiridis (inc)✝	2,878	29.9
Liberal Democrats	P Smith	2,161	22.5
Independent	E Betts	2,158	22.4
Liberal Democrats	G Greenhough	2,062	21.4
Conservative	A Beattie	1,877	19.5
Green	R Parkin	704	7.3
Turnout		9,620	56.0
Registered electors		17,180	
Labour win (new seat)			
Labour win (new seat)			

* Incumbent councillor for Ravensdale and Sherwood division prior to boundary changes. ✝ Incumbent councillor for Leeming and Forest Town division prior to boundary changes.

==== Mansfield South ====
Mansfield South
Party	Candidate	Votes	%
Labour	Albert Haynes	3,358	34.8
Labour	K Wakefield	2,420	25.1
Independent	K Allsop	2,194	22.8
Independent	Tom Appleby	1,989	20.6
Conservative	K Rees	1,871	19.4
Conservative	Philip Smith	1,706	17.7
Liberal Democrats	R Hallam	1,598	16.6
Green	J Jackson	731	7.6
Independent	B Bagri	648	6.7
Turnout		9,640	55.5
Registered electors		17,370	
Labour win (new seat)			
Labour win (new seat)			

==== Mansfield West ====
Mansfield West
Party	Candidate	Votes	%
Labour	John Carter (inc)*	4,084	44.6
Labour	Paul Henshaw	3,768	41.1
Independent	M Revill	2,177	23.8
Independent	D Smith	1,883	20.5
Liberal Democrats	D Rumley	1,518	16.6
Conservative	E Hatton	1,399	15.3
Green	M Comerford	672	7.3
Turnout		9,164	55.1
Registered electors		16,632	
Labour win (new seat)			
Labour win (new seat)			

==== Warsop ====
Warsop
Party	Candidate	Votes	%
Labour	John Allin	3,221	61.7
Independent	R Lilley	1,408	27.0
Conservative	J Rees	589	11.3
Turnout		5,218	58.3
Registered electors		8,951	
Labour win (new boundaries)			

=== Newark and Sherwood ===
(10 seats, 10 electoral divisions)

Newark and Sherwood District
Party	Candidates						Votes		
Party	Stood	Elected	Gained	Unseated	Net	% of total	%	No.	Net %
Conservative	8	7					41.9	20,283	▲+2.9
Labour	9	3					30.0	14,544	▼-7.8
Liberal Democrats	7	0					20.2	9,769	▲+3.1
Independent	4	0					7.9	3,824	▲+1.8

Newark and Sherwood Turnout
Registered electors	75,677
Votes cast	48,420
Turnout	64.0% (▲+1.1)

==== Balderton ====
Balderton
Party	Candidate	Votes	%
Conservative	Keith Walker (inc)	2,012	43.8
Labour	J Weinbren	1,671	36.4
Liberal Democrats	Neil Allen	906	19.7
Turnout		4,589	59.5
Registered electors		7,715	
Conservative win (new boundaries)			

==== Blidworth ====
Blidworth
Party	Candidate	Votes	%
Labour	Yvonne Woodhead (inc)	2,579	56.2
Independent	Geoff Merry	2,007	43.8
Turnout		4,586	56.1
Registered electors		8,177	
Labour win (new boundaries)			

==== Collingham ====
Collingham
Party	Candidate	Votes	%
Conservative	Vincent Dobson (inc)	3,130	50.5
Labour	L Goff	1,839	29.7
Liberal Democrats	Marylyn Rayner	1,230	19.8
Turnout		6,199	64.1
Registered electors		9,664	
Conservative win (new boundaries)			

==== Farndon and Muskham ====
Farndon and Muskham
Party	Candidate	Votes	%
Conservative	Sue Saddington	2,509	54.2
Liberal Democrats	D Logue	1,307	28.2
Labour	V Hall	813	17.6
Turnout		4,629	74.0
Registered electors		6,256	
Conservative win (new seat)			

==== Farnsfield and Lowdham ====
Farnsfield and Lowdham
Party	Candidate	Votes	%
Conservative	Andy Stewart	3,618	57.0
Labour	M Pain	1,338	21.1
Liberal Democrats	G Ball	1,132	17.8
Independent	T Cutler	257	4.1
Turnout		6,345	72.5
Registered electors		8,747	
Conservative win (new seat)			

==== Newark East ====
Newark East
Party	Candidate	Votes	%
Conservative	Peter Prebble (inc)*	1,865	41.5
Labour	A Bradbury	1,670	37.1
Liberal Democrats	I Harrison	964	21.4
Turnout		4,499	60.1
Registered electors		7,483	
Conservative win (new seat)			

==== Newark West ====
Newark West
Party	Candidate	Votes	%
Conservative	Keith Girling	1,868	41.9
Labour	A Hannaford	1,725	38.7
Liberal Democrats	A Hargreaves	866	19.4
Turnout		4,459	54.3
Registered electors		8,209	
Conservative win (new seat)			

==== Ollerton and Boughton ====
Ollerton and Boughton
Party	Candidate	Votes	%
Labour	Stella Smedley (inc)	Unopposed	
Labour win (new boundaries)			

==== Rufford ====
Rufford
Party	Candidate	Votes	%
Labour	Andrew Freeman (inc)	2,909	48.4
Conservative	R Bradbury	1,542	25.7
Independent	J Faben	954	15.9
Independent	V Bobo	606	10.1
Turnout		6,011	61.7
Registered electors		9,744	
Labour win (new seat)			

==== Southwell and Caunton ====
Southwell and Caunton
Party	Candidate	Votes	%
Conservative	Bruce Laughton (inc)*	3,739	52.6
Liberal Democrats	S Thompstone	3,364	47.4
Turnout		7,103	73.4
Registered electors		9,682	
Conservative win (new seat)			

* Incumbent councillor for Caunton division prior to boundary changes.

=== Rushcliffe ===
(9 seats, 8 electoral divisions)

Rushcliffe District
Party	Candidates						Votes		
Party	Stood	Elected	Gained	Unseated	Net	% of total	%	No.	Net %
Conservative	9	9					45.3	25,279	▲+0.9
Liberal Democrats	9	0					25.4	14,164	▲+1.4
Labour	9	0					25.3	14,149	▼-6.3
Green	4	0					3.8	2,098	NEW
Independent	1	0					0.3	146	NEW

Rushcliffe Turnout
Registered electors	80,375
Votes cast	56,042
Turnout	69.7% (▲+3.0)

==== Bingham ====
Bingham
Party	Candidate	Votes	%
Conservative	Martin Suthers (inc)	2,709	43.4
Liberal Democrats	George Davidson	1,915	30.6
Labour	B Howes	1,478	23.7
Independent	M Morar	146	2.3
Turnout		6,248	68.7
Registered electors		9,095	
Conservative win (new boundaries)			

==== Cotgrave ====
Cotgrave
Party	Candidate	Votes	%
Conservative	Richard Butler (inc)	2,333	45.3
Labour	A Macinnes	1,827	35.5
Liberal Democrats	S Hull	987	19.2
Turnout		5,147	63.1
Registered electors		8,156	
Conservative win (new boundaries)			

==== Keyworth ====
Keyworth
Party	Candidate	Votes	%
Conservative	John Cottee (inc)	3,009	47.7
Liberal Democrats	S Boote	2,558	40.5
Labour	R Crosby	742	11.8
Turnout		6,309	74.6
Registered electors		8,453	
Conservative win (new boundaries)			

==== Radcliffe on Trent ====
Radcliffe on Trent
Party	Candidate	Votes	%
Conservative	Kay Cutts (inc)	3,631	54.2
Liberal Democrats	D Allen	1,569	23.4
Labour	W Stephens	1,497	22.4
Turnout		6,697	71.1
Registered electors		9,420	
Conservative win (new boundaries)			

==== Ruddington ====
Ruddington
Party	Candidate	Votes	%
Conservative	Reg Adair	2,805	47.8
Liberal Democrats	P McGowan	1,634	27.8
Labour	G Aldridge	1,117	19.0
Green	T Gallagher	315	5.4
Turnout		5,871	72.3
Registered electors		8,122	
Conservative win (new boundaries)			

==== Soar Valley ====
Soar Valley
Party	Candidate	Votes	%
Conservative	Lynn Sykes	2,932	47.9
Labour	Paul Morrissey	1,865	30.4
Liberal Democrats	C Evans	1,330	21.7
Turnout		6,127	69.4
Registered electors		8,829	
Conservative win (new seat)			

==== West Bridgford Central and South ====
West Bridgford Central and South
Party	Candidate	Votes	%
Conservative	Michael Cox (inc)*	4,873	37.7
Conservative	Barrie Cooper	4,755	36.8
Labour	Graham Jackson (inc)✝	3,822	29.6
Labour	Liz Plant	3,752	29.0
Liberal Democrats	L Porter	2,678	20.7
Liberal Democrats	Steve Travis	2,440	18.9
Green	S Anthony	1,351	10.4
Green	J Beresford	1,213	9.4
Turnout		12,930	68.7
Registered electors		18,822	

* Incumbent councillor for West Bridgford South division prior to boundary changes. ✝ Incumbent councillor for West Bridgford East division prior to boundary changes.

==== West Bridgford West ====
West Bridgford West
Party	Candidate	Votes	%
Conservative	Martin Brandon-Bravo (inc)	2,987	44.5
Labour	R Crawley	1,801	26.8
Liberal Democrats	J Banks	1,493	22.2
Green	B Hewis	432	6.4
Turnout		6,713	70.8
Registered electors		9,478	
Conservative win (new boundaries)			
