= 2005 Warwickshire County Council election =

2005 UK local government election

2005 local election results in Warwickshire

Elections in May 2005 to elect all 62 councillors to run Warwickshire County Council for the next four years resulted, party politically, in no overall control and as such, a continuation of this status, which was first reached in 1993. In these elections the largest single party switched to the Conservatives however the administration from 2005 was led by the Labour Party with ongoing general support of Liberal Democrat party votes.

== Summary ==
Warwickshire County Council election, 2005
Party	Seats	Gains	Losses	Net gain/loss	Seats %	Votes %	Votes	+/−
Conservative	27			+6				
Labour	23			-4				
Liberal Democrats	11			-2				
Green	0			0				
Independent	1			0				
UKIP	0							
TUSC	0							
BNP	0							
English Democrat	0							

== Results arranged by district ==
The county is divided into 59 divisions i.e. wards which can be grouped into five districts with between 8 and 15 wards.

=== North Warwickshire ===
Seat	Result	Majority
Arley	Conservative HOLD	1,055
Atherstone	Conservative GAIN from Labour	87
Baddlesley	Labour HOLD	188
Coleshill	Conservative HOLD	604
Hartshill	Conservative GAIN from Labour	370
Kingsbury	Labour HOLD	221
Polesworth	Conservative GAIN from Labour	200
Water Orton	Conservative HOLD	937

=== Nuneaton and Bedworth ===
Seat	Result	Majority
Abbey		
Arbury and Stockingford		
Bede		
Bedworth North		
Bedworth West		
Bulkington		
Camp Hill		
Galley Common		
Poplar		
St. Nicholas		
Weddington		
Wembrook		
Whitestone		

=== Rugby ===
Seat	Result	Majority
Admirals		
Brownsover		
Caldecott		
Dunchurch		
Earl Craven		
Eastlands and Hillmorton*		
Fosse		
Lawford and New Bilton		

=== Stratford upon Avon ===
Seat	Result	Majority
Alcester		
Aston Cantlow		
Bidford on Avon		
Feldon		
Henley in Arden		
Kineton		
Shipston on Stour		
Southam		
Stour and the Vale		
Stratford Avenue and New Town		
Stratford South*		
Studley		
Wellesbourne		

=== Warwick ===
Seat	Result	Majority
Bishop's Tachbrook		
Cubbington		
Kenilworth, Abbey		
Kenilworth, Park Hill		
Kenilworth, St. John's		
Leamington, Brunswick		
Leamington, Milverton		
Leamington North*		
Leamington, Willes		
Leek Wootton		
Warwick North		
Warwick South		
Warwick West		
Whitnash		

- Wards marked with a star elect two members
