= Buckinghamshire County Council elections =

Buckinghamshire County Council in England was elected every four years from 1973 until 2020.

== Political control ==
From 1973 until its merger into Buckinghamshire Council in 2020, political control of the council was consistently held by the Conservative party:

Year	Control
1973	Conservative
1977	Conservative
1981	Conservative
1985	Conservative
1989	Conservative
1993	Conservative
1997	Conservative
2001	Conservative
2005	Conservative
2009	Conservative
2013	Conservative
2017	Conservative

In the 1993 elections, it was the only county council to have elected a majority of Conservative councillors, while the party lost majorities on strongholds such as Essex, Kent and Lincolnshire.

== Council elections ==
- 1973 Buckinghamshire County Council election
- 1977 Buckinghamshire County Council election
- 1981 Buckinghamshire County Council election
- 1985 Buckinghamshire County Council election
- 1989 Buckinghamshire County Council election
- 1993 Buckinghamshire County Council election
- 1997 Buckinghamshire County Council election
- 2001 Buckinghamshire County Council election
- 2005 Buckinghamshire County Council election (boundary changes increased the number of seats by 2)
- 2009 Buckinghamshire County Council election
- 2013 Buckinghamshire County Council election (boundary changes reduced the number of seats by 8)
- 2017 Buckinghamshire County Council election

== County result maps ==
2005 results map

2009 results map

2013 results map

2017 results map

== By-election results ==
=== 1997-2001 ===
Long Crendon & Brill by-election 1 October 1998
Party	Candidate	Votes	%	±%
Conservative	David Graves	1,232	57.4	+8.8
Liberal Democrats	Eileen Young	505	23.5	+23.5
Labour	Ian Chapman	410	19.1	−10.2
Majority		727	33.9	
Turnout		2,147	33.4	
Conservative hold		Swing		

Wendover By-Election 6 May 1999
Party	Candidate	Votes	%	±%
Conservative	Marion Clayton	1,211	55.8	+4.0
Liberal Democrats	Robert Hammond	958	44.2	+10.3
Majority		253	11.6	
Turnout		2,169	39.0	
Conservative hold		Swing		

Marsh and Micklefield By-Election 15 June 2000
Party	Candidate	Votes	%	±%
Labour	Caroline Martnes	579	61.3	+15.9
Conservative	Frank Downes	266	28.2	−1.2
Liberal Democrats	Matthew Brown	99	10.5	−14.7
Majority		313	33.1	
Turnout		944	17.6	
Labour hold		Swing		

=== 2001-2005 ===
Gerrards Cross By-Election 19 August 2004
Party	Candidate	Votes	%	±%
Conservative	Peter Hardy	933	77.1	+13.9
Liberal Democrats	Peter Chapman	277	22.9	−2.7
Majority		656	54.2	
Turnout		1,210	22.2	
Conservative hold		Swing		

Buckingham South By-Election 18 November 2004
Party	Candidate	Votes	%	±%
Conservative	Hedley Cadd	1,098	51.1	+7.6
Labour	Robin Stuchbury	559	26.0	−2.6
Liberal Democrats	Ian Metherell	491	22.8	−5.1
Majority		539	25.1	
Turnout		2,148	19.4	
Conservative hold		Swing		

=== 2005-2009 ===
Rymead, Tylers Green & Loudwater By-Election 20 April 2006
Party	Candidate	Votes	%	±%
Conservative	Peter Cartwright	1,277	61.0	+13.6
Liberal Democrats	Trevor Snaith	596	28.5	−2.1
Labour	Clare Martens	221	10.5	−11.5
Majority		681	32.5	
Turnout		2,094	20.5	
Conservative hold		Swing		

Stoke Poges and Farnham Common By-Election 29 March 2007
Party	Candidate	Votes	%	±%
Conservative	Trevor Egleton	875	57.3	−4.8
Independent	William Foulds	283	18.5	+18.5
Liberal Democrats	Ingrid Greenhow	280	18.3	−1.8
Labour	Lindsey Gillan	89	5.8	−11.9
Majority		592	38.8	
Turnout		1,527	23.8	
Conservative hold		Swing		

=== 2009-2013 ===
Amersham By-Election 17 September 2009
Party	Candidate	Votes	%	±%
Conservative	Steven Adams	1,840	46.6	−3.7
Liberal Democrats	Davida Allen	1,768	44.8	+0.0
UKIP	Christopher Cooke	140	3.5	+3.5
Labour	Lynda Greenhill	106	2.7	−2.2
Green	Phil Folly	95	2.4	+2.4
Majority		72	1.8	
Turnout		3,949	30.6	
Conservative hold		Swing		

=== 2017-2020 ===
Beaconsfield By-Election 2 November 2017
Party	Candidate	Votes	%	±%
Conservative	Anita Cranmer	1,298	81.3	+11.2
Liberal Democrats	Mark Skoyles	299	18.7	+2.4
Majority		999	62.6	
Turnout		1,597		
Conservative hold		Swing		

Aylesbury North-West By-Election 29 November 2018
Party	Candidate	Votes	%	±%
Liberal Democrats	Anders Christensen	654	39.3	+9.5
Conservative	Ashley Waite	507	30.5	+6.0
Labour	Liz Hind	426	25.6	+2.9
Green	Mark Wheeler	77	4.6	+1.3
Majority		147	8.8	
Turnout		1,664		
Liberal Democrats hold		Swing		

Totteridge and Bowerdean By-Election 9 February 2019
Party	Candidate	Votes	%	±%
Labour	Israr Rashid	978	40.8	+15.5
East Wycombe Independents	Matt Knight	668	27.8	−12.1
Liberal Democrats	Ben Holkham	508	21.2	+6.4
Conservative	Richard Peters	245	10.2	−9.8
Majority		310	12.9	
Turnout		2,399		
Labour gain from East Wycombe Independents		Swing		
