= 2005 Buckinghamshire County Council election =

2005 UK local government election

← 2001	5 May 2005	2009 →

All 57 seats to Buckinghamshire County Council 29 seats needed for a majority
	First party	Second party	Third party
Party	Conservative	Liberal Democrats	Labour
Seats before	40	9	5
Seats won	44	11	2
Seat change	▲4	▲2	▼3
Popular vote	146,980	97,289	47,072
Percentage	49.67%	32.88%	15.91%
- Map showing the results of the 2005 Buckinghamshire County Council elections.
Council control before election
Conservative
Council control after election
Conservative

Elections to Buckinghamshire County Council were held on 5 May 2005, alongside the 2005 UK General Election and other local elections in England and Northern Ireland. The entire council was up for election, with each successful candidate serving a four-year term of office, expiring in 2009.

The Conservative Party remained in overall control of the council, winning 44 out of 57 seats. 11 of the remaining seats were won by the Liberal Democrats, whilst the remaining 2 were won by Labour.

== Results summary ==
Buckinghamshire County Council Election Result 2005
Party	Seats	Gains	Losses	Net gain/loss	Seats %	Votes %	Votes	+/−
Conservative	44			+4	77.19	49.67	146,980	
Liberal Democrats	11			+2	19.30	32.88	97,289	
Labour	2			-3	3.51	15.91	47,072	
Aylesbury Residents Action	0				0.00	0.87	2,587	
UKIP	0				0.00	0.41	1,200	
Green	0				0.00	0.26	777	

The overall turnout was 65.4% with a total of 295,905 valid votes cast. A total of 2,397 ballots were rejected.

== Council Composition ==
Following the last election in 2001 the composition of the council was:

↓
40	9	5
Conservatives	Liberal Democrats	Labour

After the election, the composition of the council was:

↓
44	11	2
Conservatives	Liberal Democrats	Labour

== Ward results ==
All results by ward are listed below. The turnout numbers recorded is the valid voter turnout, not the total number of ballots cast including those that were spoiled.

=== Abbey ===
Abbey (1 seat)
Party	Candidate	Votes	%
Conservative	Lesley Clarke	1,804	50.1
Labour	Carolyn Pudney	996	27.7
Liberal Democrats	Stephen Guy	801	22.2
Majority		808	22.4
Turnout		3,601	60.2
Conservative hold			

=== Alderbourne ===
Alderbourne (1 seat)
Party	Candidate	Votes	%
Conservative	William Lidgate	2,339	61.8
Liberal Democrats	Edwina Mitchell	1,446	38.2
Majority		893	23.6
Turnout		3,785	62.5
Conservative hold			

=== Amersham ===
Amersham (2 seats)
Party	Candidate	Votes	%
Conservative	David Meacock	3,770	24.2
Conservative	Pauline Wilkinson	3,651	23.4
Liberal Democrats	Davida Allen	3,567	22.9
Liberal Democrats	Patricia Pearce	2,739	17.6
Labour	Lynda Greenhill	959	6.1
Labour	David Tench	909	5.8
Majority		84	0.5
Turnout		8,707	66.0
Conservative hold			
Conservative hold			

=== Aston Clinton ===
Aston Clinton (1 seat)
Party	Candidate	Votes	%
Conservative	William Chapple	3,062	64.1
Liberal Democrats	Peter Vernon	1,440	30.2
Aylesbury Residents Action	Andrew Hill	273	5.7
Majority		1,622	33.9
Turnout		4,775	68.6
Conservative hold			

=== Aylesbury East ===
Aylesbury East (2 seats)
Party	Candidate	Votes	%
Liberal Democrats	Chloe Willetts	2,789	21.4
Liberal Democrats	Raj Khan	2,482	19.0
Conservative	Andrew Huxley	2,377	18.2
Conservative	Abdul Khaliq	1,791	13.7
Labour	Richard Wells	1,224	9.4
Labour	Mohammed Khaliel	1,084	8.3
Independent	Patrick Martin	659	5.1
Aylesbury Residents Action	Julia Powell	323	2.5
Aylesbury Residents Action	Elsie Davies	303	2.3
Majority		105	0.8
Turnout		13,032	60.0
Liberal Democrats hold			
Liberal Democrats hold			

=== Aylesbury North ===
Aylesbury North (2 seats)
Party	Candidate	Votes	%
Liberal Democrats	Mary Baldwin	2,159	22.2
Liberal Democrats	Niknam Hussain	1,665	17.1
Conservative	Jane Sale	1,587	16.3
Conservative	Wajid Kiani	1,262	13.0
Labour	Philip McGoldrick	1,225	12.6
Labour	Sandra Moorcroft	1,019	10.5
Aylesbury Residents Action	Suzanna Copcutt	419	4.3
Aylesbury Residents Action	David Davies	379	3.9
Majority		78	5.1
Turnout		9,715	52.2
Liberal Democrats hold			
Liberal Democrats hold			

=== Aylesbury South ===
Aylesbury South (1 seat)
Party	Candidate	Votes	%
Liberal Democrats	Denise Summers	1,446	39.0
Conservative	Elisabeth Wilkins	1,435	38.7
Labour	Henry Gardner	730	19.7
Aylesbury Residents Action	Margaret Martin	100	2.7
Majority		11	0.3
Turnout		3,711	61.1
Liberal Democrats hold			

=== Aylesbury South East ===
Aylesbury South East (1 seat)
Party	Candidate	Votes	%
Liberal Democrats	Chester Jones	2,330	47.4
Conservative	John Champion	1,917	39.0
Labour	Adrian Mumford-Smith	570	11.6
Aylesbury Residents Action	Dennis Price	95	1.9
Majority		413	8.4
Turnout		4,912	72.0
Liberal Democrats hold			

=== Aylesbury West ===
Aylesbury West (2 seats)
Party	Candidate	Votes	%
Liberal Democrats	Freda Roberts	3,074	21.1
Liberal Democrats	Steve Kennell	3,050	21.0
Conservative	Brian Foster	2,283	15.7
Conservative	John Wiseman	2,283	15.7
Labour	Neal Bonham	1,755	12.1
Labour	Zard Khan	1,479	10.2
Aylesbury Residents Action	Julie Ludlow	333	2.3
Aylesbury Residents Action	Martin Hill	292	2.0
Majority		767	5.3
Turnout		14,549	54.5
Liberal Democrats hold			
Liberal Democrats hold			

=== Beaconsfield ===
Beaconsfield (1 seat)
Party	Candidate	Votes	%
Conservative	Margaret Dewar	2,546	65.1
Liberal Democrats	Barbara Wainwright	856	21.9
Labour	Stephen Lathrope	511	13.1
Majority		1,690	43.2
Turnout		3,913	67.7
Conservative hold			

=== Bernwood ===
Bernwood (1 seat)
Party	Candidate	Votes	%
Conservative	Michael Edmonds	3,189	59.0
Labour	Joanna Dodsworth	1,113	20.6
Liberal Democrats	Alan Sherwell	1,106	20.5
Majority		2,076	38.4
Turnout		5,408	72.9
Conservative hold			

=== Booker, Cressex & Sands ===
Booker, Cressex & Sands (1 seat)
Party	Candidate	Votes	%
Conservative	Alan Hill	1,397	39.0
Labour	Nigel Vickery	1,303	36.4
Liberal Democrats	Tuffail Hussain	529	14.8
UKIP	Lynne Pearce	354	9.9
Majority		94	2.6
Turnout		3,583	58.2
Conservative hold			

=== Bowerdean, Micklefield & Totteridge ===
Bowerdean, Micklefield and Totteridge (2 seats)
Party	Candidate	Votes	%
Labour	Julia Wassell	2,555	24.3
Labour	Chaudhary Ditta	2,003	19.0
Conservative	Kathleen Dix	1,874	17.8
Conservative	Ian McEnnis	1,756	16.7
Liberal Democrats	Frances Alexander	1,185	11.2
Liberal Democrats	Ian Morton	1,163	11.0
Majority		129	1.2
Turnout		10,536	53.9
Labour hold			
Labour hold			

=== Buckingham North ===
Buckingham North (1 seat)
Party	Candidate	Votes	%
Conservative	David Polhill	2,141	50.7
Labour	Robert Lehmann	1,194	28.3
Liberal Democrats	Robert Lewis	884	21.0
Majority		947	22.4
Turnout		4,219	63.0
Conservative hold			

=== Buckingham South ===
Buckingham South (1 seat)
Party	Candidate	Votes	%
Conservative	Hedley Cadd	2,374	49.2
Labour	Robin Stuchbury	1,718	35.6
Liberal Democrats	Michael Cashman	738	15.3
Majority		656	13.6
Turnout		4,830	68.0
Conservative hold			

=== Bulstrode ===
Bulstrode (1 seat)
Party	Candidate	Votes	%
Conservative	Peter Hardy	2,513	65.2
Liberal Democrats	Jane Hartley	850	22.0
Labour	Phillip Oram	493	12.8
Majority		1,663	43.2
Turnout		3,856	66.1
Conservative hold			

=== Burnham Beeches ===
Burnham Beeches (1 seat)
Party	Candidate	Votes	%
Conservative	Linda Hazell	2,239	60.5
Liberal Democrats	David Linsdall	802	21.7
Labour	Mark Craddock	658	17.8
Majority		1,437	38.8
Turnout		3,699	61.2
Conservative hold			

=== Chalfont St Peter ===
Chalfont St Peter (1 seat)
Party	Candidate	Votes	%
Conservative	Bruce Allen	2,512	59.8
Liberal Democrats	Richard Williams	1,006	24.0
Labour	Malcolm Horne	682	16.2
Majority		1,506	35.8
Turnout		4,200	62.8
Conservative hold			

=== Chesham East ===
Chesham East (1 seat)
Party	Candidate	Votes	%
Liberal Democrats	Patricia Lindsley	2,003	44.4
Conservative	Mohammed Bhatti	1,632	36.1
Labour	Kathryn Drinkall	532	11.8
Green	Nicholas Wilkins	348	7.7
Majority		371	8.3
Turnout		4,515	65.4
Liberal Democrats hold			

=== Chesham North West ===
Chesham North West (1 seat)
Party	Candidate	Votes	%
Conservative	Steven Adams	1,363	38.8
Liberal Democrats	Michael Brand	1,333	38.0
Labour	Peter Ward	632	18.0
Green	Phillip Folly	184	5.2
Majority		30	0.8
Turnout		3,512	65.8
Conservative hold			

=== Chess Valley ===
Chess Valley (1 seat)
Party	Candidate	Votes	%
Conservative	Hugh Wilson	1,439	42.2
Liberal Democrats	Jane Bramwell	1,225	35.9
Labour	David Cross	499	14.6
Green	Kathleen Folly	245	7.2
Majority		214	6.3
Turnout		3,408	64.5
Conservative hold			

=== Chiltern Ridges ===
Chiltern Ridges (1 seat)
Party	Candidate	Votes	%
Conservative	Patricia Birchley	2,395	59.8
Liberal Democrats	John Clutterbuck	1,222	30.5
Labour	Barbara Hunter	389	9.7
Majority		1,173	29.3
Turnout		4,006	72.1
Conservative hold			

=== Chiltern Valley ===
Chiltern Valley (1 seat)
Party	Candidate	Votes	%
Conservative	Robert Woollard	2,221	57.0
Liberal Democrats	Neil Timberlake	814	20.9
Labour	Kathleen Draper	689	17.7
UKIP	Brian Pearce	171	4.4
Majority		1,407	36.1
Turnout		3,895	65.5
Conservative hold			

=== Downley, Disraeli, Oakridge & Castlefield ===
Downley, Disraeli, Oakridge & Castlefield (2 seats)
Party	Candidate	Votes	%
Conservative	Wendy Mallen	2,991	21.3
Conservative	Zahir Mohammed	2,521	17.9
Liberal Democrats	Pamela Brooks	2,282	16.2
Labour	Sajid Ali	2,260	16.1
Labour	Chaudry Shafique	2,247	16.0
Liberal Democrats	William Doran	1,749	12.4
Majority		239	1.7
Turnout		14,050	60.4
Conservative hold			
Conservative hold			

=== Gerrards Cross & Denham North ===
Gerrards Cross & Denham North (1 seat)
Party	Candidate	Votes	%
Conservative	Peter Roberts	2,260	63.6
Liberal Democrats	Gillian Underwood	815	22.9
Labour	John Hunter	481	13.5
Majority		1,445	40.7
Turnout		3,556	62.8
Conservative hold			

=== Great Brickhill ===
Great Brickhill (1 seat)
Party	Candidate	Votes	%
Conservative	Brenda Jennings	2,765	60.8
Liberal Democrats	Llewellyn Monger	1,781	39.2
Majority		984	21.6
Turnout		4,546	72.1
Conservative hold			

=== Great Missenden ===
Great Missenden (1 seat)
Party	Candidate	Votes	%
Conservative	Michael Colston	2,882	58.8
Liberal Democrats	Sebastian Berry	2,018	41.2
Majority		864	17.6
Turnout		4,900	70.9
Conservative hold			

=== Greater Hughenden ===
Greater Hughenden (1 seat)
Party	Candidate	Votes	%
Conservative	Richard Pushman	3,123	64.6
Liberal Democrats	William Barnes	1,710	35.4
Majority		1,413	29.2
Turnout		4,833	73.9
Conservative hold			

=== Grendon Underwood ===
Grendon Underwood (1 seat
Party	Candidate	Votes	%
Conservative	John Cartwright	2,744	56.6
Liberal Democrats	Ian Metherell	2,100	43.4
Majority		644	13.2
Turnout		4,844	67.0
Conservative hold			

=== Haddenham ===
Haddenham (1 seat)
Party	Candidate	Votes	%
Conservative	Margaret Aston	2,494	55.8
Liberal Democrats	Eileen Young	1,978	44.2
Majority		516	11.6
Turnout		4,472	70.0
Conservative hold			

=== Hazelmere ===
Hazelmere (1 seat)
Party	Candidate	Votes	%
Conservative	David Carroll	3,471	71.8
Labour	Ian Bates	1,364	28.2
Majority		2,107	43.6
Turnout		4,835	65.9
Conservative hold			

=== Icknield and Bledlow ===
Icknield and Bledlow (1 seat)
Party	Candidate	Votes	%
Conservative	Paul Rogerson	3,124	65.7
Liberal Democrats	Lee Harte	1,092	23.0
Labour	Anne Edwards	541	11.4
Majority		2,032	42.7
Turnout		4,757	71.6
Conservative hold			

=== Iver ===
Iver (1 seat)
Party	Candidate	Votes	%
Liberal Democrats	Alex Oxley	2,011	52.6
Conservative	Kathleen Webber	1,811	47.4
Majority		200	5.2
Turnout		3,822	63.7
Liberal Democrats hold			

=== Ivinghoe ===
Ivinghoe (1 seat)
Party	Candidate	Votes	%
Liberal Democrats	Avril Davies	2,722	53.0
Conservative	Terence Jones	2,411	47.0
Majority		311	6.0
Turnout		5,133	73.3
Liberal Democrats hold			

=== Marlow ===
Marlow (2 seats)
Party	Candidate	Votes	%
Conservative	Douglas Anson	4,040	23.9
Conservative	Frank Sweatman	3,532	20.9
Liberal Democrats	Maurice Oram	3,112	18.4
Liberal Democrats	James Campbell	2,965	17.6
Labour	Janet Pritchard	1,313	7.8
Labour	Paul Mansell	1,241	7.4
UKIP	Diana Davis	675	7.4
Majority		420	2.5
Turnout		16,878	68.2
Conservative hold			
Conservative hold			

=== Penn, Coleshill & Holmer Green ===
Penn, Coleshill & Holmer Green (1 seat)
Party	Candidate	Votes	%
Conservative	Francis Robinson	2,782	59.7
Liberal Democrats	Deborah Williams	1,246	26.8
Labour	Michael Cole	629	13.5
Majority		1,536	32.9
Turnout		4,657	69.0
Conservative hold			

=== Ryemead, Tylers Green & Loudwater ===
Ryemead, Tylers Green & Loudwater (2 seats)
Party	Candidate	Votes	%
Conservative	Elizabeth Lay	2,908	24.6
Conservative	David Shakespeare	2,781	23.5
Liberal Democrats	Ian Forbes	1,875	15.9
Liberal Democrats	Trevor Snaith	1,612	13.6
Labour	Clare Martens	1,350	11.4
Labour	Peter Morris	1,303	11.0
Majority		906	7.6
Turnout		11,829	60.7
Conservative hold			
Conservative hold			

=== Stoke Poges & Farnham Common ===
Stoke Poges & Farnham Common (1 seat)
Party	Candidate	Votes	%
Conservative	Rodney Royston	2,605	62.1
Liberal Democrats	Eamonn Lyons	844	20.1
Labour	Lindsey Gillan	743	17.7
Majority		1,761	42.0
Turnout		4,192	66.0
Conservative hold			

=== Stokenchurch, Radnage & West Wycombe ===
Stokenchurch, Radnage & West Wycombe (1 seat)
Party	Candidate	Votes	%
Conservative	Frank Downes	2,369	54.0
Liberal Democrats	Rosemary Eames	1,114	25.4
Labour	Samuel Trueman	902	20.6
Majority		1,255	28.6
Turnout		4,385	63.4
Conservative hold			

=== Taplow, Dorney & Lent Rise ===
Taplow, Dorney & Lent Rise (1 sale)
Party	Candidate	Votes	%
Conservative	Peter Smith	2,018	57.9
Liberal Democrats	Christopher Tucker	1,469	42.1
Majority		549	15.8
Turnout		3,487	61.2
Conservative hold			

=== Terriers & Amersham Hill ===
Terriers & Amersham Hill (1 seat)
Party	Candidate	Votes	%
Conservative	Valerie Letheren	1,784	47.2
Labour	Kiern Moran	1,004	26.6
Liberal Democrats	Wendy Guy	991	26.2
Majority		780	20.6
Turnout		3,779	61.7
Conservative hold			

=== Thames ===
Thames (2 seats)
Party	Candidate	Votes	%
Conservative	Michael Appleyard	4,539	28.7
Conservative	David Watson	4,052	25.6
Liberal Democrats	Brian Pollock	2,843	18.0
Liberal Democrats	Jeff Herschel	2,808	17.7
Labour	Michael Phelan	1,592	10.1
Majority		1,209	7.6
Turnout		15,834	66.5
Conservative hold			
Conservative hold			

=== The Chalfonts & Seer Green ===
The Chalfonts & Seer Green (2 seats)
Party	Candidate	Votes	%
Conservative	Pamela Bacon	5,514	31.5
Conservative	Martin Tett	4,882	27.9
Liberal Democrats	Michael Meakin	2,578	14.7
Liberal Democrats	Peter Nowell	2,535	14.5
Labour	Sarah Hutchison	1,088	6.2
Labour	Gearoid De Barra	922	5.3
Majority		2,304	13.2
Turnout		17,519	67.2
Conservative hold			
Conservative hold			

=== The Risboroughs ===
The Risboroughs (1 seat)
Party	Candidate	Votes	%
Conservative	Dennis Green	2,277	53.9
Liberal Democrats	Nelson Bathurst	1,231	29.2
Labour	William Dore	713	16.9
Majority		1,046	24.7
Turnout		4,221	67.2
Conservative hold			

=== Wendover & Halton ===
Wendover & Halton (1 seat)
Party	Candidate	Votes	%
Conservative	Marion Clayton	1,984	48.9
Liberal Democrats	Christopher Peeler	1,547	38.1
Labour	Robert Pile	458	11.3
Aylesbury Residents Action	Dorothy Price	70	1.7
Majority		437	10.8
Turnout		4,059	67.1
Conservative hold			

=== Wing ===
Wing (1 seat)
Party	Candidate	Votes	%
Conservative	Quintin Ings-Chambers	2,323	55.9
Liberal Democrats	Mark Watson	1,832	44.1
Majority		491	11.8
Turnout		4,155	71.3
Conservative hold			

=== Winslow ===
Winslow (1 seat)
Party	Candidate	Votes	%
Conservative	David Rowlands	2,841	62.2
Liberal Democrats	Harold Newman	1,725	37.8
Majority		1,116	24.4
Turnout		4,566	70.1
Conservative hold			
