= 2009 Buckinghamshire County Council election =

2009 UK local government election

← 2005	4 June 2009	2013 →

All 57 seats to Buckinghamshire County Council 29 seats needed for a majority
	First party	Second party
Party	Conservative	Liberal Democrats
Seats before	44	11
Seats won	46	11
Seat change	▲2	Steady
Popular vote	92,450	54,389
Percentage	48.46%	28.51%
- 2009 local election results in Buckinghamshire
Council control before election
Conservative
Council control after election
Conservative

Elections to Buckinghamshire County Council took place on 4 June 2009 as part of the 2009 United Kingdom local elections, having been delayed from 7 May, to coincide with elections to the European Parliament.

All locally registered electors (British, Irish, Commonwealth and European Union citizens) who were aged 18 or over on Thursday 4 June 2009 were entitled to vote in the local elections. Those who were temporarily away from their ordinary address (for example, away working, on holiday, in student accommodation or in hospital) were also entitled to vote in the local elections, although those who had moved abroad and registered as overseas electors cannot vote in the local elections. It is possible to register to vote at more than one address (such as a university student who had a term-time address and lives at home during holidays) at the discretion of the local Electoral Register Office, but it remains an offence to vote more than once in the same local government election.

== Results Summary ==
2009 Buckinghamshire County Council election
Party	Seats	Gains	Losses	Net gain/loss	Seats %	Votes %	Votes	+/−
Conservative	46	3	1	+2	80.70	48.46	92,450	-1.21
Liberal Democrats	11	3	3	0	19.30	28.51	54,389	-4.37
UKIP	0	0	0	0	0.00	13.68	26,109	+13.27
Labour	0	0	2	-2	0.00	6.02	11,493	-9.89
Independent	0	0	0	0	0.00	1.86	3,553	+1.86
Green	0	0	0	0	0.00	1.07	2,031	+0.81
BNP	0	0	0	0	0.00	0.40	770	+0.40

The overall turnout was 40.50% with a total of 190,795 valid votes cast. A total of 843 ballots were rejected.

== Council Composition ==
Following the last election in 2005 the composition of the council was:

↓
44	11	2
Conservatives	Liberal Democrats	L

After the election, the composition of the council was:

↓
46	11
Conservatives	Liberal Democrats

L - Labour

== Ward results ==
Asterisks denote incumbent Councillors seeking re-election. Councillors seeking re-election were elected in 2005, and results are compared to that year's polls on that basis. All results are listed below:

=== Abbey ===
Abbey (1 seat)
Party	Candidate	Votes	%	±%
Conservative	Lesley Clarke*	1,201	58.0	+7.9
Liberal Democrats	Robert Perkins	333	16.1	−6.1
UKIP	Joshua Richardson	278	13.4	
Labour	Ria Ramsaran	257	12.4	−15.3
Majority		868	41.9	+19.5
Turnout		2,069	32.4	−27.8
Conservative hold		Swing		

=== Alderbourne ===
Alderbourne (1 seat)
Party	Candidate	Votes	%	±%
Conservative	William Lidgate*	1,131	51.9	−9.9
UKIP	Richard Fagan	606	27.8	
Liberal Democrats	Edwina Mitchell	444	20.4	−17.8
Majority		525	24.1	+0.5
Turnout		2,181	34.1	−28.4
Conservative hold		Swing		

=== Amersham ===
Amersham (2 seats)
Party	Candidate	Votes	%	±%
Conservative	Martin Phillips	3,075	26.7	+2.5
Conservative	Pauline Wilkinson*	2,897	25.2	+1.8
Liberal Democrats	Davida Allen	2,738	23.8	+0.9
Liberal Democrats	Susan Jordan	2,202	19.1	+1.5
Labour	Peter Harper	299	2.6	−3.5
Labour	Oliver Hyams	295	2.6	−3.2
Majority		159	1.4	+0.9
Turnout		11,506	46.0	−20.0
Conservative hold		Swing		
Conservative hold		Swing		

=== Aston Clinton ===
Aston Clinton (1 seat)
Party	Candidate	Votes	%	±%
Conservative	Bill Chapple*	2,104	62.8	−1.3
Liberal Democrats	Paul Hughes	652	19.5	−10.7
UKIP	Lynne Roberts	596	17.8	
Majority		1,452	43.3	+9.4
Turnout		3,352	44.4	−24.2
Conservative hold		Swing		

=== Aylesbury East ===
Aylesbury East (2 seats)
Party	Candidate	Votes	%	±%
Liberal Democrats	Jenny Puddefoot	1,868	22.1	+0.7
Liberal Democrats	Raj Khan*	1,856	22.0	+3.0
Conservative	Andy Gattward	1,301	15.4	−2.8
Conservative	Abdul Khaliq	1,072	12.7	−1.0
UKIP	Ann Day	931	11.0	
UKIP	Pat Norris	844	10.0	
Labour	Michael Rowlinson	323	3.8	−4.5
Labour	Richard Wells	245	2.9	−6.5
Majority		555	6.6	+5.8
Turnout		8,440	37.4	−22.6
Liberal Democrats hold		Swing		
Liberal Democrats hold		Swing		

=== Aylesbury North ===
Aylesbury North (2 seats)
Party	Candidate	Votes	%	±%
Liberal Democrats	Mary Baldwin*	1,275	18.2	−4.0
Liberal Democrats	Niknam Hussain*	1,168	16.7	−0.4
Conservative	Philip Turner	1,149	16.4	+0.1
Conservative	Mark Winn	1,024	14.6	+1.6
UKIP	Chris Adams	829	11.8	
UKIP	Bruce Bolton	742	10.6	
Labour	Neal Bonham	330	4.7	−5.8
Labour	Philip McGolrick	315	4.5	−8.1
Independent	Andy Huxley	183	2.6	
Majority		19	0.3	−4.8
Turnout		7,015	32.5	−19.7
Liberal Democrats hold		Swing		
Liberal Democrats hold		Swing		

=== Aylesbury South ===
Aylesbury South (1 seat)
Party	Candidate	Votes	%	±%
Conservative	Brian Roberts	1,172	46.2	+7.5
Liberal Democrats	Mark Willis	736	29.0	−10.0
UKIP	Brian Adams	440	17.3	
Labour	Ron Gardner	191	7.5	−12.2
Majority		436	17.2	+16.9
Turnout		2,539	40.0	−21.1
Conservative gain from Liberal Democrats		Swing		

=== Aylesbury South East ===
Aylesbury South East (1 seat)
Party	Candidate	Votes	%	±%
Liberal Democrats	Chester Jones*	1,427	41.9	−5.5
Conservative		1,418	41.7	+2.7
UKIP	Gerard McCormack	425	12.5	
Labour	Ruth McGoldrick	133	3.9	−7.7
Majority		9	0.2	−8.2
Turnout		3,403	49.8	−22.2
Liberal Democrats hold		Swing		

=== Aylesbury West ===
Aylesbury West (2 seats)
Party	Candidate	Votes	%	±%
Liberal Democrats	Freda Roberts*	2,164	22.8	+1.7
Liberal Democrats	Steven Kennell*	1,914	20.2	−0.8
Conservative	Marion Dorrell	1,290	13.6	−2.1
Conservative	Denise Summers	1,243	13.1	−2.6
UKIP	Petra Johns	1,023	10.8	
UKIP	John Wiseman	972	10.2	
Labour	Michael Beall	499	5.3	−6.8
Labour	Kiern Moran	393	4.1	−6.1
Majority		624	6.6	+1.3
Turnout		9,498	31.9	−22.6
Liberal Democrats hold		Swing		
Liberal Democrats hold		Swing		

=== Beaconsfield ===
Beaconsfield (1 seat)
Party	Candidate	Votes	%	±%
Conservative	Adrian Busby	1,481	64.8	−0.3
Liberal Democrats	Jane Hartley	390	17.1	−4.8
UKIP	Joan Martin	313	13.7	
Labour	John Hunter	100	4.4	−8.7
Majority		1,091	47.7	+4.5
Turnout		2,284	37.9	−29.8
Conservative hold		Swing		

=== Bernwood ===
Bernwood (1 seat)
Party	Candidate	Votes	%	±%
Conservative	Michael Edmonds*	2,104	58.9	−0.1
Liberal Democrats	Bette Melling	673	18.8	−1.7
UKIP	Robyn Adams	481	13.5	
Labour	Joanna Dodsworth	316	8.8	−11.8
Majority		1,431	40.1	+1.7
Turnout		3,574	47.4	−25.5
Conservative hold		Swing		

=== Booker, Cressex & Sands ===
Booker, Cressex & Sands (1 seat)
Party	Candidate	Votes	%	±%
Conservative	Alan Hill*	730	36.6	−2.4
UKIP	Brian Pearce	657	32.9	+23.0
Labour	Nigel Vickery	334	16.7	−19.7
Liberal Democrats	Paula Lee	274	13.7	−1.1
Majority		73	3.7	+1.1
Turnout		1,995	31.9	−26.3
Conservative hold		Swing		

=== Bowerdean, Micklefield & Totteridge ===
Bowerdean, Micklefield and Totteridge (2 seats)
Party	Candidate	Votes	%	±%
Liberal Democrats	Chaudhary Ditta*	1,855	24.3	+13.1
Liberal Democrats	Julia Wassell*	1,854	24.2	+13.2
Conservative	Bob Bate	1,121	14.7	−3.1
Conservative	Arif Hussain	1,104	14.4	−2.3
UKIP	Lynne Pearce	510	6.7	
Labour	Kathleen Draper	450	5.9	−18.4
Labour	Peter Morris	396	5.2	−13.8
UKIP	Amber Pinnock	358	4.7	
Majority		733	9.5	+8.3
Turnout		7,648	33.3	−20.6
Liberal Democrats gain from Labour		Swing		
Liberal Democrats gain from Labour		Swing		

Both Julia Wassell and Chaudhary Ditta were previously elected as Labour councillors.

=== Buckingham North ===
Buckingham North (1 seat)
Party	Candidate	Votes	%	±%
Conservative	David Polhill*	1,413	57.3	+6.6
Liberal Democrats	Lucy Monger	612	24.8	+3.8
UKIP	Alfred May	442	17.9	
Majority		801	32.5	+10.1
Turnout		2,467	34.8	−28.0
Conservative hold		Swing		

=== Buckingham South ===
Buckingham South (1 seat)
Party	Candidate	Votes	%	±%
Conservative	Hedley Cadd*	1,560	52.2	+3.0
Labour	Robin Stuchbury	909	30.4	−5.2
UKIP	John Russell	518	17.3	
Majority		651	21.8	+8.2
Turnout		2,987	40.0	−28.0
Conservative hold		Swing		

=== Bulstrode ===
Bulstrode (1 seat)
Party	Candidate	Votes	%	±%
Conservative	Peter Hardy*	1,407	63.0	−2.2
Liberal Democrats	Peter Chapman	487	21.8	−0.2
UKIP	Ken Rumens	341	15.3	
Majority		920	41.2	−2.0
Turnout		2,235	39.9	−26.2
Conservative hold		Swing		

=== Burnham Beeches ===
Burnham Beeches (1 seat)
Party	Candidate	Votes	%	±%
Conservative	Linda Hazell*	1,321	60.0	−0.5
Liberal Democrats	Chris Cole	383	17.4	−4.3
UKIP	Peter Price	330	15.0	
Labour	Helena Wright	169	7.7	−10.1
Majority		938	42.6	+3.8
Turnout		2,203	35.0	−26.2
Conservative hold		Swing		

=== Chalfont St Peter ===
Chalfont St Peter (1 seat)
Party	Candidate	Votes	%	±%
Conservative	Bruce Allen*	1,698	66.6	+6.8
Liberal Democrats	Karoline Lamb	395	15.5	−8.5
Green	Tony Abbott	320	12.6	
Labour	Kim Honour	135	5.3	−10.9
Majority		1,303	51.1	+15.3
Turnout		2,548	38.7	−24.1
Conservative hold		Swing		

=== Chesham East ===
Chesham East (1 seat)
Party	Candidate	Votes	%	±%
Conservative	Mohammad Bhatti	1,283	42.3	+6.2
Liberal Democrats	Alison Pirouet	855	28.2	−16.2
UKIP	Reginald Amos	422	13.9	
Green	Nic Wilkins	345	11.4	+3.7
Labour	Janet Sjogren	130	4.3	−7.5
Majority		428	14.1	+5.8
Turnout		3,035	44.7	−20.7
Conservative gain from Liberal Democrats		Swing		

=== Chesham North West ===
Chesham North West (1 seat)
Party	Candidate	Votes	%	±%
Liberal Democrats	Michael Brand	984	39.1	+1.1
Conservative	Steven Adams*	947	37.6	−1.2
UKIP	Hazel Feist	286	11.4	
Green	Phil Folly	151	6.0	+0.8
Labour	Peter Ward	148	5.9	−12.1
Majority		37	1.5	+0.7
Turnout		2,516	46.3	−19.5
Liberal Democrats gain from Conservative		Swing		

=== Chess Valley ===
Chess Valley (1 seat)
Party	Candidate	Votes	%	±%
Conservative	Noel Brown	1,120	53.5	+11.3
Liberal Democrats	Roy Abraham	538	25.7	−10.2
Green	Tina Kamei	285	13.6	+6.4
Labour	David Cross	151	7.2	−7.4
Majority		582	27.8	+21.5
Turnout		2,094	40.4	−24.1
Conservative hold		Swing		

=== Chiltern Ridges ===
Chiltern Ridges (1 seat)
Party	Candidate	Votes	%	±%
Conservative	Patricia Birchley*	1,643	58.8	−1.0
Liberal Democrats	Richard Williams	550	19.7	−10.8
UKIP	Barry Kempson	350	12.5	
Green	Rob Craig	249	8.9	−0.8
Majority		1,093	39.1	−19.8
Turnout		2,792	50.4	−21.7
Conservative hold		Swing		

=== Chiltern Valley ===
Chiltern Valley (1 seat)
Party	Candidate	Votes	%	±%
Conservative	Robert Woollard*	1,462	63.5	+6.5
Liberal Democrats	Neil Timberlake	384	16.7	−4.2
UKIP	Daniel Lewis	289	12.5	+8.1
Labour	Janet Pritchard	169	7.3	−10.4
Majority		1,078	46.8	+10.7
Turnout		2,304	37.5	−28.0
Conservative hold		Swing		

=== Downley, Disraeli, Oakridge & Castlefield ===
Downley, Disraeli, Oakridge & Castlefield (2 seats)
Party	Candidate	Votes	%	±%
Conservative	Zahir Mohammed*	2,196	23.5	+5.6
Conservative	Wendy Mallen*	2,077	22.3	+1.0
Labour	Mohammed Hanif	1,261	13.5	−2.6
Labour	Ian Bates	997	10.7	−5.3
Liberal Democrats	Andy Randall	962	10.3	−5.9
Liberal Democrats	Matt Brown	831	8.9	−3.5
UKIP	Ruth Bolton	517	5.5	
UKIP	Gavin Richardson	492	5.3	
Majority		816	8.8	+7.1
Turnout		9,333	37.5	−42.9
Conservative hold		Swing		
Conservative hold		Swing		

=== Gerards Cross & Denham North ===
Gerards Cross & Denham North (1 seat)
Party	Candidate	Votes	%	±%
Conservative	Roger Reed	1,205	51.1	−12.5
Independent	Chris Brown	841	35.7	
UKIP	John Fagan	310	13.2	
Majority		364	15.4	25.3
Turnout		2,356	39.9	22.9
Conservative hold		Swing		

=== Great Brickhill ===
Great Brickhill (1 seat)
Party	Candidate	Votes	%	±%
Conservative	Brenda Jennings*	1,836	60.6	−0.2
Liberal Democrats	Geoff Twiss	767	25.3	−13.9
UKIP	Gareth Tyzack	425	14.0	
Majority		1,069	35.3	+13.7
Turnout		3,028	45.1	−27.0
Conservative hold		Swing		

=== Great Missenden ===
Great Missenden (1 seat)
Party	Candidate	Votes	%	±%
Conservative	Michael Colston*	2,052	65.2	+6.4
Liberal Democrats	Brenda Barker	651	20.7	−20.5
UKIP	Dennis Sluman	320	10.2	
Labour	Barbara Hunter	125	4.0	
Majority		1,401	44.5	+26.9
Turnout		3,148	45.0	−25.9
Conservative hold		Swing		

=== Greater Hughenden ===
Greater Hughenden (1 seat)
Party	Candidate	Votes	%	±%
Conservative	Richard Pushman*	1,877	65.7	+1.1
Liberal Democrats	Kevin Peters	426	14.9	−20.5
UKIP	Mike Slack	381	13.3	
Labour	William Cass	172	6.0	
Majority		1,451	50.8	+21.6
Turnout		2,856	44.1	−29.8
Conservative hold		Swing		

=== Grendon Underwood ===
Grendon Underwood (1 seat)
Party	Candidate	Votes	%	±%
Conservative	John Cartwright*	1,445	43.8	−12.8
Liberal Democrats	Ian Metherell	985	29.9	−13.5
UKIP	Dave Fowler	868	26.3	
Majority		460	13.9	+0.7
Turnout		3,298	44.0	−23.0
Conservative hold		Swing		

=== Haddenham ===
Haddenham (1 seat)
Party	Candidate	Votes	%	±%
Conservative	Margaret Aston*	1,641	52.1	−3.7
Liberal Democrats	David Vick	1,109	35.2	−9.0
UKIP	Stefanie Falle	399	12.7	
Majority		532	16.9	+5.3
Turnout		3,149	47.2	−22.8
Conservative hold		Swing		

=== Hazlemere ===
Hazlemere (1 seat)
Party	Candidate	Votes	%	±%
Conservative	David Carroll*	1,727	62.5	−9.3
Liberal Democrats	David Johnson	562	20.4	
UKIP	Barbara Adams	358	13.0	
BNP	Hilary Tait	114	4.1	
Majority		1,165	42.1	−1.5
Turnout		2,761	36.9	−29.0
Conservative hold		Swing		

=== Icknield and Bledlow ===
Icknield and Bledlow (1 seat)
Party	Candidate	Votes	%	±%
Conservative	Paul Rogerson*	2,166	68.8	+3.1
Liberal Democrats	Peter Vernon	560	17.8	−5.2
UKIP	Derek Coles	422	13.4	
Majority		1,606	51.0	+8.3
Turnout		3,148	47.3	−24.3
Conservative hold		Swing		

=== Iver ===
Iver (1 seat)
Party	Candidate	Votes	%	±%
Conservative	Ruth Vigor-Hedderly	1,042	41.6	
Liberal Democrats	Alan Oxley*	981	39.2	
UKIP	Susan Fagan	481	19.2	
Majority		61	2.4	
Turnout		2,504	39.3	
Conservative gain from Liberal Democrats		Swing		

=== Ivinghoe ===
Ivinghoe (1 seat)
Party	Candidate	Votes	%	±%
Liberal Democrats	Avril Davies*	1,637	47.9	−5.1
Conservative	Christopher Poll	1,392	40.7	−6.3
UKIP	Martin Norris	389	11.4	
Majority		245	7.2	+1.2
Turnout		3,418	46.8	−26.5
Liberal Democrats hold		Swing		

=== Marlow ===
Marlow (2 seats)
Party	Candidate	Votes	%	±%
Conservative	Richard Scott	2,710	25.6	+4.7
Conservative	Douglas Anson*	2,653	25.0	+1.1
Liberal Democrats	Maurice Oram	1,688	15.9	−2.5
Liberal Democrats	James Campbell	1,660	15.7	+1.9
UKIP	Alan Harper	651	6.1	−1.3
UKIP	Jamie Boyce	466	4.4	
Labour	Helen Ingram	346	3.3	−4.5
Labour	Alan Kaye	256	2.4	−5.0
BNP	Richard Hamilton	163	1.5	
Majority		965	9.1	+6.6
Turnout		10,593	40.5	27.7
Conservative hold		Swing		
Conservative hold		Swing		

=== Penn, Coleshill & Holmer Green ===
Penn, Coleshill & Holmer Green (1 seat)
Party	Candidate	Votes	%	±%
Conservative	David Schofield	2,199	69.0	+9.3
Liberal Democrats	Bob Young	515	16.2	−10.6
UKIP	Philip Whitehead	328	10.3	
Labour	Lynda Greenhill	145	4.5	9.0
Majority		1,684	52.8	+19.9
Turnout		3,187	47.1	−21.9
Conservative hold		Swing		

=== Ryemead, Tylers Green & Loudwater ===
Ryemead, Tylers Green & Loudwater (2 seats)
Party	Candidate	Votes	%	±%
Conservative	Peter Cartwright	2,077	26.8	+2.2
Conservative	David Shakespeare*	1,955	25.3	+2.2
Liberal Democrats	Ray Farmer	1,399	18.1	+2.2
Liberal Democrats	Trevor Snaith	1,377	17.8	+4.2
UKIP	Niki Adams	401	5.2	
UKIP	Nicola Paine	348	4.5	
BNP	Helen Hamilton	183	2.4	
Majority		556	7.2	−0.4
Turnout		7,740	37.0	−23.7
Conservative hold		Swing		
Conservative hold		Swing		

=== Stoke Poges & Farnham Common ===
Stoke Poges & Farnham Common (1 seat)
Party	Candidate	Votes	%	±%
Conservative	Trevor Egleton	1,499	62.8	+0.7
UKIP	Delphine Gray-Fisk	391	16.4	
Liberal Democrats	Jason Bingley	310	13.0	−7.1
Labour	Lindsey Gillan	186	7.8	−9.9
Majority		1,108	46.4	+4.4
Turnout		2,386	36.2	−29.8
Conservative hold		Swing		

=== Stokenchurch, Radnage & West Wycombe ===
Stokenchurch, Radnage & West Wycombe (1 seat)
Party	Candidate	Votes	%	±%
Conservative	Frank Downes*	1,368	55.7	+1.7
Liberal Democrats	Michael Mill	478	19.5	−5.9
UKIP	Aimee Gibson	405	16.5	
Labour	Henry Oriabure	205	8.3	−12.3
Majority		890	36.2	+7.6
Turnout		2,456	33.8	−27.2
Conservative hold		Swing		

=== Taplow, Dorney & Lent Rise ===
Taplow, Dorney & Lent Rise (1 seat)
Party	Candidate	Votes	%	±%
Conservative	Dev Dhillon	1,039	52.9	−5.0
Liberal Democrats	David Linsdall	377	19.2	−22.9
UKIP	Ken Wight	360	18.3	
Labour	Catherine Palasz	187	9.5	
Majority		662	33.7	+17.9
Turnout		1,963	33.4	−27.8
Conservative hold		Swing		

=== Terriers & Amersham Hill ===
Terriers & Amersham Hill (1 seat)
Party	Candidate	Votes	%	±%
Conservative	Valerie Letheren*	1,204	55.6	+8.4
Liberal Democrats	Wendy Guy	485	22.4	−3.8
UKIP	Heather Adams	247	11.4	
Labour	Matthew Kitching	228	10.5	−16.1
Majority		719	33.2	+12.6
Turnout		2,164	33.8	−27.9
Conservative hold		Swing		

=== Thames ===
Thames (2 seats)
Party	Candidate	Votes	%	±%
Conservative	Mike Appleyard*	2,864	28.5	−0.2
Conservative	David Watson*	2,469	24.6	−1.0
Liberal Democrats	Brian Pollock	1,382	13.8	−4.2
Liberal Democrats	Jeff Herschel	1,268	12.6	+5.1
Green	Jem Bailey	681	6.8	
UKIP	Stephern Barrow	538	5.4	
UKIP	Jessica Black	536	5.3	
BNP	Matthew Tait	310	3.1	
Majority		1,087	10.8	+3.2
Turnout		10,048	37.9	−28.6
Conservative hold		Swing		
Conservative hold		Swing		

=== The Chalfonts & Seer Green ===
The Chalfonts & Seer Green (2 seats)
Party	Candidate	Votes	%	±%
Conservative	Timothy Butcher	3,451	29.5	−2.0
Conservative	Martin Tett*	3,112	26.6	−1.3
Liberal Democrats	Michael Meakin	1,178	10.1	−4.6
Liberal Democrats	Anne Rafferty	1,112	9.5	−5.0
UKIP	John Archdeacon	931	7.9	
UKIP	Christopher Cooke	839	7.2	
Independent	Graham Smith	586	5.0	
Labour	Gearoid De Barra	257	2.2	−3.1
Labour	Mihir Roy	245	2.1	−4.1
Majority		1,934	16.5	+3.3
Turnout		11,711	44.1	−23.1
Conservative hold		Swing		
Conservative hold		Swing		

=== The Risboroughs ===
The Risboroughs (1 seat)
Party	Candidate	Votes	%	±%
Conservative	Carl Etholen	1,082	42.6	−11.3
Independent	Alan Turner	1,004	39.5	
Liberal Democrats	Michael Smith	278	10.9	−18.3
UKIP	Debz Sharman	177	7.0	
Majority		78	3.1	−21.6
Turnout		2,541	39.8	−27.4
Conservative hold		Swing		

=== Wendover & Halton ===
Wendover & Halton (1 seat)
Party	Candidate	Votes	%	±%
Conservative	Marion Clayton	1,490	54.7	+5.8
Liberal Democrats	Chris Peeler	720	26.4	−11.7
UKIP	John Lesingham	377	13.8	
Labour	Robert Pile	136	5.0	−6.3
Majority		770	28.3	+17.5
Turnout		2,723	45.2	−22.0
Conservative hold		Swing		

=== Wing ===
Wing (1 seat)
Party	Candidate	Votes	%	±%
Conservative	Netta Glover	1,206	41.1	−14.8
Independent	Peter Cooper	939	32.0	
Liberal Democrats	Corry Cashman	455	15.5	−28.6
UKIP	Katherine Ward	332	11.3	
Majority		267	9.1	−2.7
Turnout		2,932	47.8	−23.5
Conservative hold		Swing		

=== Winslow ===
Winslow (1 seat)
Party	Candidate	Votes	%	±%
Conservative	David Rowlands*	1,553	48.3	−13.9
Liberal Democrats	Llew Monger	1,225	38.1	+0.3
UKIP	Oliver Dagois	437	13.6	
Majority		328	10.2	
Turnout		3,215	46.3	
Conservative hold		Swing		
