= 2001 Buckinghamshire County Council election =

2001 UK local government election

← 1997	7 June 2001	2005 →

All 54 seats to Buckinghamshire County Council 28 seats needed for a majority
	First party	Second party	Third party
Party	Conservative	Liberal Democrats	Labour
Seats before	38	10	5
Seats won	40	9	5
Seat change	▲2	▼1	Steady
Popular vote	118,469	74,491	34,865
Percentage	51.0%	32.1%	15.0%
- The County of Buckinghamshire within England.
Council control before election
Conservative
Council control after election
Conservative

The 2001 Buckinghamshire Council election took place on 7 June 2001 to elect members of Buckinghamshire County Council in England. The whole council was up for election and the Conservative Party stayed in overall control of the council.

The election had been postponed from 3 May to be held at the same time as the 2001 general election. Several councillors stood down at the election including the chairman, Ken Ross, and a former Conservative group leader, Mark Greenburgh. The results saw the Conservative make two gains to hold 40 of the 54 seats.

== Election result ==
Buckinghamshire local election result 2001
Party	Seats	Gains	Losses	Net gain/loss	Seats %	Votes %	Votes	+/−
Conservative	40			+2	74.1			
Liberal Democrats	9			-1	16.7			
Labour	5			0	9.3			
Independent	0			-1	0.0			

== Council Composition ==
After the election, the composition of the council was:

↓
40	9	5
Conservatives	Liberal Democrats	Labour
