= 2017 Buckinghamshire County Council election =

2017 UK local government election

| ← 2013 | 4 May 2017 | 2021 → |

All 49 seats to Buckinghamshire County Council 25 seats needed for a majority
| | First party | Second party |
|---|---|---|
| Party | Conservative | Liberal Democrats |
| Seats before | 36 | 5 |
| Seats won | 41 | 4 |
| Seat change | ▲5 | ▼1 |
| Popular vote | 72,070 | 25,276 |
| Percentage | 53.13% | 18.63% |
| | Third party | Fourth party |
| Party | Independent | Labour |
| Seats before | 1 | 1 |
| Seats won | 3 | 1 |
| Seat change | ▲2 | Steady |
| Popular vote | 6,852 | 18,469 |
| Percentage | 5.05% | 13.61% |
- Map showing the results of the 2017 Buckinghamshire County Council elections.
Council control before election
Conservative
Council control after election
Conservative

The 2017 Buckinghamshire County Council election took place on 4 May 2017 as part of the 2017 local elections in the United Kingdom. All 49 councillors were elected from electoral divisions which returned one county councillor each by first-past-the-post voting for a four-year term of office, due to expire in 2021.

The Conservative Party retained an overall control on the council, winning 41 of the 49 seats on the council. Of the remaining 9 councillors, there were four Liberal Democrats, three Independents and one Labour. UKIP lost all six of their seats.

This was the last Buckinghamshire County Council election.

Due to the replacement of Buckinghamshire County Council by Buckinghamshire Council in 2020, the successor election to this election is the 2021 Buckinghamshire Council election.

== Result ==
2017 Buckinghamshire County Council Election Result
| Party | Seats | Gains | Losses | Net gain/loss | Seats % | Votes % | Votes | +/− |
|---|---|---|---|---|---|---|---|---|
| Conservative | 41 | 6 | 1 | +5 | 83.68 | 53.13 | 72,070 | +12.08% |
| Liberal Democrats | 4 | 2 | 3 | -1 | 8.16 | 18.63 | 25,276 | +3.72% |
| East Wycombe Independents | 2 | 2 | 0 | +2 | 4.08 | 1.53 | 2,079 | +1.53% |
| Labour | 1 | 1 | 1 | 0 | 2.04 | 13.61 | 18,469 | +2.16% |
| Independent | 1 | 0 | 0 | 0 | 2.04 | 3.52 | 4,773 | +1.48% |
| UKIP | 0 | 0 | 6 | -6 | 0.00 | 6.05 | 8,204 | -20.94% |
| Green | 0 | 0 | 0 | 0 | 0.00 | 3.53 | 4,794 | +1.82% |

The overall turnout was 34.8% with a total of 135,665 valid votes cast.

== Council Composition ==
Following the last election in 2013 the composition of the council was:

↓
| 36 | 6 | 5 | 1 | 1 |
| Conservatives | UKIP | Lib Dems | L | I |

After the election, the composition of the council was:

↓
| 41 | 4 | 2 | 1 | 1 |
| Conservatives | Lib Dems | EWI | L | I |

Lib Dems - Liberal Democrats
L - Labour Party
I - Independent
EWI - East Wycombe Independents

== Ward results ==
Asterisks denote incumbent Councillors seeking re-election. Councillors seeking re-election were elected in 2013, and results are compared to that year's polls on that basis. All results are listed below:

=== Abbey ===
Abbey
| Party | Candidate | Votes | % | ±% |
|---|---|---|---|---|
| Conservative | Lesley Mary Clarke* | 1,224 | 50.6 | +3.3 |
| Labour | Mohammed Rafiq | 801 | 33.1 | +9.2 |
| Liberal Democrats | Tamsin Nicola Holkham | 198 | 8.2 | +1.9 |
| UKIP | Bob Harris | 110 | 4.5 | −18.1 |
| Green | Neil James Denham | 87 | 3.6 | |
| Majority | | 423 | 17.5 | −5.9 |
| Turnout | | 2,420 | 32.6 | +8.5 |
| Conservative hold | | Swing | | |

=== Amersham & Chesham Bois ===
Amersham & Chesham Bois
| Party | Candidate | Votes | % | ±% |
|---|---|---|---|---|
| Conservative | Gareth David Williams | 1,763 | 58.9 | +7.4 |
| Liberal Democrats | Walid Marzouk | 844 | 28.2 | +11.3 |
| Labour | Alexander Damien Rhys | 259 | 8.6 | −1.0 |
| UKIP | Freda Margaret Stevens | 129 | 4.3 | −17.7 |
| Majority | | 919 | 30.7 | +1.2 |
| Turnout | | 2,995 | 39.3 | +8.5 |
| Conservative hold | | Swing | | |

=== Aston Clinton & Bierton ===
Aston Clinton & Bierton
| Party | Candidate | Votes | % | ±% |
|---|---|---|---|---|
| Conservative | Bill Chapple* | 1,765 | 59.7 | +20.5 |
| Liberal Democrats | Mark Frederick Willis | 370 | 12.5 | −3.5 |
| UKIP | Geoff Baile | 328 | 11.1 | −25.3 |
| Labour | Mike Butcher | 307 | 10.4 | +2.0 |
| Green | Coral Simpson | 188 | 6.4 | |
| Majority | | 1,395 | 47.2 | +44.5 |
| Turnout | | 2,958 | 38.9 | +3.7 |
| Conservative hold | | Swing | | |

=== Aylesbury East ===
Aylesbury East
| Party | Candidate | Votes | % | ±% |
|---|---|---|---|---|
| Conservative | Julie Elizabeth Ward | 1,374 | 43.7 | +13.5 |
| Liberal Democrats | Allison Jayne Harrison | 862 | 27.4 | +6.8 |
| UKIP | Phil Gomm* | 432 | 13.7 | −21.9 |
| Labour | Damien Marie Bishop | 355 | 11.3 | −1.3 |
| Green | Andy Capjon | 122 | 3.9 | |
| Majority | | 512 | 16.3 | +10.9 |
| Turnout | | 3,145 | 38.6 | +2.9 |
| Conservative gain from UKIP | | Swing | | |

=== Aylesbury North ===
Aylesbury North
| Party | Candidate | Votes | % | ±% |
|---|---|---|---|---|
| Liberal Democrats | Raj Wali Khan* | 1,066 | 40.6 | +7.0 |
| Conservative | Ammer Raheel | 577 | 22.0 | +1.8 |
| Labour | Gary Paxton | 492 | 18.7 | −2.2 |
| UKIP | Paul Hobbs | 314 | 12.0 | −13.3 |
| Green | Colin Norman Bloxham | 176 | 6.7 | |
| Majority | | 489 | 18.6 | +10.2 |
| Turnout | | 2,625 | 31.0 | +3.4 |
| Liberal Democrats hold | | Swing | | |

=== Aylesbury North West ===
Aylesbury North West
| Party | Candidate | Votes | % | ±% |
|---|---|---|---|---|
| Liberal Democrats | Martin Paul Farrow | 658 | 29.8 | +3.9 |
| Conservative | Graham Moore | 542 | 24.5 | +10.1 |
| Labour | John Anthony Cowell | 501 | 22.7 | +7.8 |
| UKIP | Andy Huxley* | 436 | 19.7 | −25.1 |
| Green | Huseyin Caglayan | 72 | 3.3 | |
| Majority | | 116 | 5.3 | −13.6 |
| Turnout | | 2,209 | 25.3 | +0.7 |
| Liberal Democrats gain from UKIP | | Swing | | |

=== Aylesbury South East ===
Aylesbury South East
| Party | Candidate | Votes | % | ±% |
|---|---|---|---|---|
| Conservative | Brian Keith Roberts* | 1,468 | 53.5 | +13.6 |
| Liberal Democrats | Richard Gordon Lloyd | 499 | 18.2 | +3.6 |
| Labour | Ansar Gulzar | 394 | 14.4 | +1.3 |
| UKIP | Heather Adams | 248 | 9.0 | −19.0 |
| Green | Nigel Antony Foster | 135 | 4.9 | |
| Majority | | 969 | 35.3 | +23.4 |
| Turnout | | 2,744 | 32.0 | +3.3 |
| Conservative hold | | Swing | | |

=== Aylesbury South West ===
Aylesbury South West
| Party | Candidate | Votes | % | ±% |
|---|---|---|---|---|
| Liberal Democrats | Niknam Hussain | 851 | 34.7 | +2.1 |
| Labour | Mark Trevor Bateman | 689 | 28.1 | +9.0 |
| Conservative | Sophie Elizabeth Vaughan-Evans | 526 | 21.5 | +10.3 |
| UKIP | Brian Adams* | 330 | 13.5 | −21.6 |
| Green | Mark Wheeler | 55 | 2.2 | |
| Majority | | 162 | 6.6 | +4.1 |
| Turnout | | 2,451 | 31.9 | +4.7 |
| Liberal Democrats gain from UKIP | | Swing | | |

=== Aylesbury West ===
Aylesbury West
| Party | Candidate | Votes | % | ±% |
|---|---|---|---|---|
| Liberal Democrats | Steven Michael Lambert | 1,362 | 55.8 | +14.2 |
| Conservative | Peter William Ward | 522 | 21.4 | +6.4 |
| Labour | Carmel Traynor | 322 | 13.2 | +1.5 |
| UKIP | Debbie Huntley | 237 | 9.7 | −22.0 |
| Majority | | 840 | 34.4 | +24.5 |
| Turnout | | 2,443 | 31.4 | +4.1 |
| Liberal Democrats hold | | Swing | | |

=== Beaconsfield ===
Beaconsfield
| Party | Candidate | Votes | % | ±% |
|---|---|---|---|---|
| Conservative | Alan Martin Walters | 1,828 | 70.1 | +9.5 |
| Liberal Democrats | Peter Jeffrey Chapman | 424 | 16.3 | +3.0 |
| Labour | Nigel Paul Vickery | 179 | 6.9 | |
| UKIP | Tim Scott | 175 | 6.7 | −19.5 |
| Majority | | 1,404 | 53.8 | +19.4 |
| Turnout | | 2,606 | 31.7 | +4.1 |
| Conservative hold | | Swing | | |

=== Bernwood ===
Bernwood
| Party | Candidate | Votes | % | ±% |
|---|---|---|---|---|
| Conservative | Clive Harriss | 1,482 | 47.4 | +3.4 |
| Green | David Richard Lyons | 965 | 30.9 | +18.1 |
| Labour | Alison Duncan Watt | 497 | 15.9 | +0.2 |
| UKIP | Colin Evered | 184 | 5.9 | −15.8 |
| Majority | | 517 | 16.5 | −5.8 |
| Turnout | | 3,128 | 39.9 | +4.8 |
| Conservative hold | | Swing | | |

=== Booker, Cressex & Castlefield ===
Booker, Cressex & Castlefield
| Party | Candidate | Votes | % | ±% |
|---|---|---|---|---|
| Labour | Majid Hussain | 1,608 | 44.9 | +16.6 |
| Conservative | Zahir Mohammed* | 1,597 | 44.6 | −0.5 |
| Liberal Democrats | Jenese Jacquelyn Joseph | 206 | 5.8 | −1.6 |
| UKIP | Maria Delores Busby | 169 | 4.7 | −8.1 |
| Majority | | 11 | 0.3 | −18.5 |
| Turnout | | 3,580 | 41.6 | +4.3 |
| Labour gain from Conservative | | Swing | | |

=== Buckingham East ===
Buckingham East
| Party | Candidate | Votes | % | ±% |
|---|---|---|---|---|
| Conservative | Warren Whyte* | 1,326 | 55.9 | +11.7 |
| Labour | Jon Simon Harvey | 506 | 21.3 | −2.4 |
| Liberal Democrats | Anja Schaefer | 201 | 8.5 | +3.9 |
| Green | Nicola Smith | 120 | 5.1 | |
| UKIP | Nick Shipp | 119 | 5.0 | −22.5 |
| Independent | Leah Yeoman | 99 | 4.2 | |
| Majority | | 820 | 24.6 | +7.8 |
| Turnout | | 2,371 | 33.2 | +8.8 |
| Conservative hold | | Swing | | |

=== Buckingham West ===
Buckingham West
| Party | Candidate | Votes | % | ±% |
|---|---|---|---|---|
| Conservative | Charlie Clare | 1,593 | 50.0 | +11.8 |
| Labour | Robin Stuchbury* | 1,366 | 42.9 | +2.9 |
| Liberal Democrats | David George Evershed | 124 | 3.9 | −1.2 |
| Green | Elliot John Settle | 103 | 3.2 | |
| Majority | | 227 | 7.1 | +5.2 |
| Turnout | | 3,186 | 39.4 | +7.4 |
| Conservative gain from Labour | | Swing | | |

=== Chalfont St Giles ===
Chalfont St Giles
| Party | Candidate | Votes | % | ±% |
|---|---|---|---|---|
| Conservative | Timothy Richard Butcher | 1,778 | 60.9 | +15.3 |
| Liberal Democrats | Sally Elizabeth Ash | 623 | 21.3 | +13.2 |
| UKIP | David George Meacock | 230 | 7.9 | −29.7 |
| Labour | Tim Starkey | 169 | 5.8 | −3.0 |
| Green | Philip John Wall | 121 | 4.1 | |
| Majority | | 1,155 | 39.6 | +31.6 |
| Turnout | | 2,921 | 34.9 | +5.2 |
| Conservative hold | | Swing | | |

=== Chalfont St Peter ===
Chalfont St Peter
| Party | Candidate | Votes | % | ±% |
|---|---|---|---|---|
| Conservative | David John Francis Martin | 2,009 | 70.5 | +15.1 |
| Liberal Democrats | Daniel Paul Gallagher | 555 | 19.5 | +13.4 |
| Labour | Julian Darley | 149 | 5.2 | −1.3 |
| UKIP | Andrew John Glen | 138 | 4.8 | −27.2 |
| Majority | | 1,454 | 51.0 | +27.6 |
| Turnout | | 2,851 | 34.6 | +1.7 |
| Conservative hold | | Swing | | |

=== Chesham ===
Chesham
| Party | Candidate | Votes | % | ±% |
|---|---|---|---|---|
| Conservative | Mark Wayne Shaw* | 1,704 | 56.4 | +19.7 |
| Labour | Graham Simon Gardner | 668 | 22.1 | −5.1 |
| Liberal Democrats | Frances Catherine Van Ijzendoorn | 526 | 17.4 | +5.8 |
| UKIP | Richard George Ness | 121 | 4.0 | −15.0 |
| Majority | | 1,036 | 34.3 | +24.8 |
| Turnout | | 3,019 | 40.9 | +4.3 |
| Conservative hold | | Swing | | |

=== Chess Valley ===
Chess Valley
| Party | Candidate | Votes | % | ±% |
|---|---|---|---|---|
| Conservative | Noel Lawrence Brown* | 1,557 | 52.3 | +4.8 |
| Liberal Democrats | Davina Joy Kirby | 682 | 22.9 | +7.5 |
| Labour | North Pyper | 388 | 13.0 | +2.7 |
| Green | Gillian Walker | 221 | 7.4 | −0.2 |
| UKIP | Timothy James Matthews | 130 | 4.4 | −14.7 |
| Majority | | 875 | 29.4 | +1.0 |
| Turnout | | 2,978 | 39.0 | +7.5 |
| Conservative hold | | Swing | | |

=== Chiltern Ridges ===
Chiltern Ridges
| Party | Candidate | Votes | % | ±% |
|---|---|---|---|---|
| Conservative | Patricia Mary Birchley* | 1,815 | 49.8 | +13.0 |
| Liberal Democrats | Mohammad Fayyaz | 1,232 | 33.8 | +17.0 |
| Labour | Barbara Ann Hunter | 244 | 6.7 | +2.0 |
| Green | Alan John Gray Booth | 175 | 4.8 | −2.7 |
| UKIP | Richard Neal Phoenix | 175 | 4.8 | −29.4 |
| Majority | | 583 | 16.0 | +13.4 |
| Turnout | | 3,641 | 44.4 | +4.1 |
| Conservative hold | | Swing | | |

=== Chiltern Villages ===
Chiltern Villages
| Party | Candidate | Votes | % | ±% |
|---|---|---|---|---|
| Conservative | Jean Elizabeth Teesdale* | 2,318 | 74.9 | +17.3 |
| Green | Peter James Sims | 476 | 15.4 | |
| Labour | Jacqui Jacques | 299 | 9.7 | +0.1 |
| Majority | | 1,842 | 59.5 | +25.8 |
| Turnout | | 3,093 | 35.9 | +7.7 |
| Conservative hold | | Swing | | |

=== Cliveden ===
Cliveden
| Party | Candidate | Votes | % | ±% |
|---|---|---|---|---|
| Conservative | Dev Dhillon* | 1,215 | 53.8 | +13.1 |
| Liberal Democrats | Jane Wallis | 325 | 14.4 | +6.6 |
| Labour | Alexa Anne Collins | 309 | 13.7 | +0.7 |
| Independent | Edwina Jane Glover | 249 | 11.0 | |
| UKIP | Graham Geoffrey Smith | 160 | 7.1 | −31.4 |
| Majority | | 890 | 39.4 | +37.2 |
| Turnout | | 2,258 | 30.0 | +2.7 |
| Conservative hold | | Swing | | |

=== Denham ===
Denham
| Party | Candidate | Votes | % | ±% |
|---|---|---|---|---|
| Conservative | Roger William Reed* | 1,208 | 58.2 | +4.8 |
| Liberal Democrats | Andy Milburn | 292 | 14.1 | +4.7 |
| UKIP | John Shearme | 267 | 12.9 | −24.3 |
| Labour | Charlotte Louise Hall | 156 | 7.5 | |
| Green | Robert Michael Smith | 151 | 7.3 | |
| Majority | | 916 | 44.1 | +27.9 |
| Turnout | | 2,074 | 28.2 | +3.4 |
| Conservative hold | | Swing | | |

=== Downley ===
Downley
| Party | Candidate | Votes | % | ±% |
|---|---|---|---|---|
| Conservative | Wendy Janet Mallen | 1,314 | 50.7 | +7.9 |
| Labour | Mohammed Hanif | 757 | 29.2 | −1.3 |
| Liberal Democrats | Ray Farmer | 409 | 15.8 | +6.3 |
| UKIP | John Gregory McCollough | 112 | 4.3 | −13.0 |
| Majority | | 557 | 21.5 | +9.2 |
| Turnout | | 2,592 | 32.2 | +0.5 |
| Conservative hold | | Swing | | |

=== Farnham Common & Burnham Beeches ===
Farnham Common & Burnham Beeches
| Party | Candidate | Votes | % | ±% |
|---|---|---|---|---|
| Conservative | Lin Hazell* | 1,476 | 66.2 | +7.0 |
| Liberal Democrats | Carol Lesley Linton | 463 | 20.8 | +8.7 |
| Labour | Janet Violet Sjogren | 149 | 6.7 | |
| UKIP | Susan Ann Fagan | 140 | 6.3 | −22.4 |
| Majority | | 1,013 | 45.4 | +14.9 |
| Turnout | | 2,228 | 30.9 | +4.0 |
| Conservative hold | | Swing | | |

=== Flackwell Heath, Little Marlow & Marlow South East ===
Flackwell Heath, Little Marlow & Marlow South East
| Party | Candidate | Votes | % | ±% |
|---|---|---|---|---|
| Conservative | David Martyn Watson* | 1,765 | 67.2 | +16.8 |
| Liberal Democrats | Paul Michael Anthony Burden | 409 | 15.6 | +6.9 |
| Labour | Helen Elizabeth Ingram | 272 | 10.4 | +1.8 |
| UKIP | John Albert Gooding | 180 | 6.9 | −15.5 |
| Majority | | 1,356 | 51.6 | +23.6 |
| Turnout | | 2,626 | 31.3 | +5.8 |
| Conservative hold | | Swing | | |

=== Gerrards Cross ===
Gerrards Cross
| Party | Candidate | Votes | % | ±% |
|---|---|---|---|---|
| Conservative | Barbara Lynn Gibbs | 1,221 | 57.3 | +10.1 |
| Independent | Christopher Stuart Brown | 584 | 27.4 | +4.0 |
| Liberal Democrats | Diane Margaret Holden | 201 | 9.4 | +4.2 |
| Labour | Michael Anthony Kavanagh | 126 | 5.9 | |
| Majority | | 637 | 29.9 | +14.1 |
| Turnout | | 2,132 | 31.5 | +3.8 |
| Conservative hold | | Swing | | |

=== Great Brickhill ===
Great Brickhill
| Party | Candidate | Votes | % | ±% |
|---|---|---|---|---|
| Conservative | Janet Blake* | 1,949 | 62.5 | +12.1 |
| Liberal Democrats | Dave Frearson | 469 | 15.0 | +3.2 |
| Labour | Maxine Myatt | 299 | 9.6 | |
| UKIP | Amy Howitt | 218 | 7.0 | −30.7 |
| Green | Deborah Lovatt | 182 | 5.8 | |
| Majority | | 1,480 | 47.5 | +34.8 |
| Turnout | | 3,117 | 35.2 | +2.4 |
| Conservative hold | | Swing | | |

=== Great Missenden ===
Great Missenden
| Party | Candidate | Votes | % | ±% |
|---|---|---|---|---|
| Conservative | Peter Ernest Charles Martin | 1,974 | 62.8 | +25.1 |
| Liberal Democrats | Ruth Juett | 512 | 16.3 | +12.2 |
| Green | Jennifer Sarah Brazil | 275 | 8.7 | |
| Labour | Benjamin Thomas Davies | 231 | 7.3 | +1.2 |
| UKIP | Alan Peter Stevens* | 151 | 4.8 | −35.9 |
| Majority | | 1,462 | 46.5 | +43.5 |
| Turnout | | 3,143 | 40.1 | +2.8 |
| Conservative gain from UKIP | | Swing | | |

=== Grendon Underwood ===
Grendon Underwood
| Party | Candidate | Votes | % | ±% |
|---|---|---|---|---|
| Conservative | Angela MacPherson* | 1,909 | 65.4 | +23.5 |
| Liberal Democrats | Jules Newman | 402 | 13.8 | +5.0 |
| Labour | Jennifer Ann Tuffley | 247 | 8.5 | −1.5 |
| Green | Clare Elisabeth Butler | 191 | 6.5 | −0.8 |
| UKIP | Jason Wise | 170 | 5.8 | −27.3 |
| Majority | | 1,507 | 51.6 | +42.8 |
| Turnout | | 2,919 | 34.8 | +3.8 |
| Conservative hold | | Swing | | |

=== Hazlemere ===
Hazlemere
| Party | Candidate | Votes | % | ±% |
|---|---|---|---|---|
| Conservative | Katrina Suzanne Atkins Wood* | 1,632 | 68.0 | +22.0 |
| Liberal Democrats | Ian Forbes | 324 | 13.5 | +5.4 |
| Labour | Rosie Paola Greco | 254 | 10.6 | +1.6 |
| UKIP | Philip John Whitehead | 190 | 7.9 | −29.0 |
| Majority | | 1,308 | 54.5 | +45.4 |
| Turnout | | 2,400 | 32.6 | +3.7 |
| Conservative hold | | Swing | | |

=== Iver ===
Iver
| Party | Candidate | Votes | % | ±% |
|---|---|---|---|---|
| Conservative | Luisa Katherine Sullivan | 1,357 | 62.0 | +16.9 |
| Green | Leigh Martin Tugwood | 353 | 16.1 | |
| Labour | Richard James Griggs | 246 | 11.2 | |
| UKIP | Paul Dreelan | 126 | 5.8 | −18.4 |
| Liberal Democrats | Jeff Herschel | 108 | 4.9 | −25.8 |
| Majority | | 1,004 | 45.9 | +11.5 |
| Turnout | | 2,190 | 26.8 | +0.3 |
| Conservative hold | | Swing | | |

=== Ivinghoe ===
Ivinghoe
| Party | Candidate | Votes | % | ±% |
|---|---|---|---|---|
| Conservative | Anne Wight | 1,548 | 48.1 | +13.1 |
| Liberal Democrats | Avril Cutland Davies* | 1,314 | 40.8 | +2.7 |
| Green | Johanna Wheeler | 201 | 6.2 | |
| Labour | Nina Dluzewska | 155 | 4.8 | −2.3 |
| Majority | | 234 | 7.3 | +4.2 |
| Turnout | | 3,218 | 39.5 | +6.2 |
| Conservative gain from Liberal Democrats | | Swing | | |

=== Little Chalfont & Amersham Common ===
Little Chalfont & Amersham Common
| Party | Candidate | Votes | % | ±% |
|---|---|---|---|---|
| Conservative | Martin Anthony Tett* | 1,762 | 60.4 | +7.2 |
| Liberal Democrats | Sue Jordan | 675 | 23.1 | +10.0 |
| Labour | Susan Procter | 302 | 10.4 | +1.4 |
| UKIP | Christopher Worley Radcliffe Cooke | 177 | 6.1 | −18.5 |
| Majority | | 1,097 | 37.3 | +8.7 |
| Turnout | | 2,916 | 38.5 | +9.3 |
| Conservative hold | | Swing | | |

=== Marlow ===
Marlow
| Party | Candidate | Votes | % | ±% |
|---|---|---|---|---|
| Conservative | Alex Collingwood | 2,107 | 63.7 | +6.2 |
| Liberal Democrats | Mark Andrew Skoyles | 832 | 25.2 | +12.6 |
| Labour | George William Alderman | 223 | 6.7 | −2.5 |
| UKIP | Paddy Gallaugher | 146 | 4.4 | −16.2 |
| Majority | | 1,275 | 38.5 | 1.6 |
| Turnout | | 3,308 | 40.1 | +8.8 |
| Conservative hold | | Swing | | |

=== Penn Wood & Old Amersham ===
Penn Wood & Old Amersham
| Party | Candidate | Votes | % | ±% |
|---|---|---|---|---|
| Conservative | Isobel Anne Darby | 2,247 | 69.7 | +14.8 |
| Liberal Democrats | Richard Neil Williams | 570 | 17.7 | +7.1 |
| Labour | Ruth Werbiski Dutton | 229 | 7.1 | −0.7 |
| UKIP | Liam David Noble | 178 | 5.5 | −21.2 |
| Majority | | 1,677 | 52.0 | +19.6 |
| Turnout | | 3,224 | 38.6 | +6.2 |
| Conservative hold | | Swing | | |

=== Ridgeway East ===
Ridgeway East
| Party | Candidate | Votes | % | ±% |
|---|---|---|---|---|
| Conservative | David James Carroll* | 2,238 | 68.8 | +19.6 |
| Liberal Democrats | Graeme Peter Card | 562 | 17.3 | +11.5 |
| Labour | Linda Mary Ruth Derrick | 313 | 9.6 | +2.8 |
| UKIP | Vijay Singh Srao | 140 | 4.3 | −33.9 |
| Majority | | 1,676 | 51.5 | +41.5 |
| Turnout | | 3,253 | 38.7 | +6.5 |
| Conservative hold | | Swing | | |

=== Ridgeway West ===
Ridgeway West
| Party | Candidate | Votes | % | ±% |
|---|---|---|---|---|
| Conservative | Carl Alexander Arvid Etholen* | 1,913 | 69.5 | +14.2 |
| Liberal Democrats | Candy Piercy | 496 | 18.0 | +12.9 |
| Labour | Shaharyan Khan | 181 | 6.6 | +0.2 |
| UKIP | Jonathan Mark Evered | 164 | 6.0 | −18.2 |
| Majority | | 1,417 | 51.5 | +20.4 |
| Turnout | | 2,754 | 35.2 | +4.1 |
| Conservative hold | | Swing | | |

=== Ryemead & Micklefield ===
Ryemead & Micklefield
| Party | Candidate | Votes | % | ±% |
|---|---|---|---|---|
| East Wycombe Independent | Julia Denise Wassell* | 1,149 | 43.0 | |
| Liberal Democrats | Trevor Snaith | 894 | 33.4 | −20.8 |
| Conservative | Neil Stephen Mockley | 365 | 13.6 | −2.1 |
| Labour | Naveed Javed Akhtar | 207 | 7.7 | −7.1 |
| Independent | Scott Gavin Ridley | 60 | 2.2 | |
| Majority | | 255 | 9.6 | 28.9 |
| Turnout | | 2,675 | 35.0 | +11.9 |
| [[East Wycombe Independent|Independent]] gain from Liberal Democrats | | Swing | | |

Julie Wassell was previously elected as a Liberal Democrat councillor for this ward at the last election.

=== Stoke Poges & Wexham ===
Stoke Poges & Wexham
| Party | Candidate | Votes | % | ±% |
|---|---|---|---|---|
| Conservative | Ralph Bagge | 1,512 | 68.4 | +15.1 |
| UKIP | Karen Perez | 278 | 12.6 | −18.0 |
| Labour | Rory Andrew Nosworthy | 216 | 9.8 | +0.2 |
| Liberal Democrats | Christopher Francis Woolley | 205 | 9.3 | +2.8 |
| Majority | | 1,234 | 55.8 | +33.1 |
| Turnout | | 2,211 | 28.2 | +3.6 |
| Conservative hold | | Swing | | |

=== Stone and Waddesdon ===
Stone and Waddesdon
| Party | Candidate | Votes | % | ±% |
|---|---|---|---|---|
| Conservative | Paul Irwin* | 1,625 | 61.9 | +36.2 |
| Liberal Democrats | Rebecca Halifax Beswick | 388 | 14.8 | −11.3 |
| Labour | Mike Padmore | 266 | 10.1 | |
| UKIP | Gary Good | 194 | 7.4 | −20.0 |
| Green | Greg Smith | 153 | 5.8 | |
| Majority | | 1,237 | 47.1 | +45.7 |
| Turnout | | 2,626 | 30.8 | −5.6 |
| Conservative gain from UKIP | | Swing | | |

=== Terriers & Amersham Hill ===
Terriers & Amersham Hill
| Party | Candidate | Votes | % | ±% |
|---|---|---|---|---|
| Conservative | Arif Hussain | 1,157 | 49.5 | −2.2 |
| Liberal Democrats | Steve Guy | 533 | 22.8 | +10.7 |
| Labour | Adam James Coulthard | 511 | 21.9 | +3.0 |
| UKIP | Linda Rosemary Ann Harris | 135 | 5.8 | −11.6 |
| Majority | | 624 | 26.7 | −6.1 |
| Turnout | | 2,336 | 30.9 | +5.8 |
| Conservative hold | | Swing | | |

=== The Risboroughs ===
The Risboroughs
| Party | Candidate | Votes | % | ±% |
|---|---|---|---|---|
| Conservative | Bill Bendyshe-Brown* | 1,569 | 55.0 | +18.1 |
| Independent | Andy Ball | 886 | 31.1 | |
| Liberal Democrats | Ian Patrick Metherell | 249 | 8.7 | +6.1 |
| Labour | Brian Huw Gammage | 148 | 5.2 | −0.6 |
| Majority | | 683 | 23.9 | +18.2 |
| Turnout | | 2,852 | 38.1 | +5.6 |
| Conservative hold | | Swing | | |

=== The Wooburns, Bourne End & Hedsor ===
The Wooburns, Bourne End & Hedsor
| Party | Candidate | Votes | % | ±% |
|---|---|---|---|---|
| Conservative | Mike Appleyard* | 1,265 | 47.6 | +1.6 |
| Independent | Geoff Howard | 606 | 22.8 | |
| Liberal Democrats | Mark Jolliffe | 409 | 15.4 | −6.1 |
| Labour | Wendy Byrne | 287 | 10.8 | −1.0 |
| UKIP | John Willoughby Feltrim Fagan | 93 | 3.5 | −19.2 |
| Majority | | 659 | 24.8 | +1.5 |
| Turnout | | 2,660 | 32.3 | +5.9 |
| Conservative hold | | Swing | | |

=== Totteridge & Bowerdean ===
Totteridge & Bowerdean
| Party | Candidate | Votes | % | ±% |
|---|---|---|---|---|
| East Wycombe Independent | Chaudhary Allah Ditta* | 930 | 39.9 | +1.2 |
| Labour | Sebert Headley Graham | 588 | 25.3 | −2.0 |
| Conservative | Alexander James Shayler | 466 | 20.0 | +0.4 |
| Liberal Democrats | Ben James Holkham | 344 | 14.8 | +0.4 |
| Majority | | 342 | 14.6 | +3.2 |
| Turnout | | 2,328 | 29.8 | −2.3 |
| [[East Wycombe Independent|Independent]] gain from Liberal Democrats | | Swing | | |

=== Tylers Green & Loudwater ===
Tylers Green & Loudwater
| Party | Candidate | Votes | % | ±% |
|---|---|---|---|---|
| Conservative | David Alastair Clifton Shakespeare* | 1,438 | 60.9 | +17.4 |
| Liberal Democrats | Paula Louise Lee | 539 | 22.8 | +4.1 |
| Labour | Fariha Khan | 207 | 8.8 | −0.8 |
| UKIP | Brian James Mapletoft | 179 | 7.6 | −20.6 |
| Majority | | 899 | 38.1 | +22.8 |
| Turnout | | 2,363 | 28.7 | +3.0 |
| Conservative hold | | Swing | | |

=== Wendover, Halton & Stoke Mandeville ===
Wendover, Halton & Stoke Mandeville
| Party | Candidate | Votes | % | ±% |
|---|---|---|---|---|
| Conservative | Steve Bowles | 1,687 | 55.5 | +31.4 |
| Liberal Democrats | Anders Carl Christensen | 397 | 13.1 | +9.9 |
| Labour | Martin Ian Abel | 372 | 12.2 | +6.3 |
| UKIP | Chris Adams | 326 | 10.7 | −25.6 |
| Green | Tom Peter Hodge | 256 | 8.4 | +3.5 |
| Majority | | 1,290 | 41.4 | +30.8 |
| Turnout | | 3,038 | 37.4 | +0.8 |
| Conservative gain from UKIP | | Swing | | |

=== West Wycombe ===
West Wycombe
| Party | Candidate | Votes | % | ±% |
|---|---|---|---|---|
| Independent | Darren John Hayday* | 1,409 | 51.1 | +20.8 |
| Conservative | Tony Green | 628 | 22.8 | −1.9 |
| Labour | Ghulam Rabani | 555 | 20.1 | +4.1 |
| Liberal Democrats | Neil Timberlake | 163 | 5.9 | −2.7 |
| Majority | | 1,181 | 28.3 | +22.7 |
| Turnout | | 2,755 | 37.4 | +9.2 |
| Independent hold | | Swing | | |

=== Wing ===
Wing
| Party | Candidate | Votes | % | ±% |
|---|---|---|---|---|
| Conservative | Netta Glover* | 1,366 | 43.8 | +9.4 |
| Independent | Peter Aiden Cooper | 880 | 28.2 | −1.6 |
| Labour | David Christopher Hancock | 286 | 9.2 | +2.1 |
| Liberal Democrats | Sheila De Rosa | 256 | 8.2 | +0.1 |
| UKIP | Roger Huntley | 209 | 6.7 | −13.9 |
| Green | Kumar Bala | 119 | 3.8 | |
| Majority | | 486 | 15.6 | +11.0 |
| Turnout | | 3,116 | 35.0 | +3.5 |
| Conservative hold | | Swing | | |

=== Winslow ===
Winslow
| Party | Candidate | Votes | % | ±% |
|---|---|---|---|---|
| Conservative | John Chilver* | 1,389 | 46.4 | +9.3 |
| Liberal Democrats | Llew Monger | 1,256 | 42.0 | +9.3 |
| Labour | Philip Christian Jacques | 184 | 6.1 | −0.1 |
| UKIP | Niki Adams | 163 | 5.4 | −12.5 |
| Majority | | 133 | 4.4 | 0.0 |
| Turnout | | 2,992 | 39.9 | 5.3 |
| Conservative hold | | Swing | | |
