= 1977 Buckinghamshire County Council election =

1977 UK local government election

← 1973	5 May 1977	1981 →

All 70 seats of Buckinghamshire County Council 36 seats needed for a majority
	First party	Second party
Party	Conservative	Independent
Seats before	46	1
Seats won	64	2
Seat change	▲18	▲1
Percentage	63.1%	5.3%
	Third party	Fourth party
Party	Labour	Others
Seats before	16
Seats won	1	3
Seat change	▼15
Percentage	19.8%	2.8%
- The County of Buckinghamshire within England.
Council control before election
Conservative
Council control after election
Conservative

Elections to Buckinghamshire County Council were held on Thursday, 5 May 1977, when the whole council of 70 members was up for election.

The result was that the Conservatives comfortably retained their control, winning sixty-four seats, a gain of eighteen. The ranks of Labour were decimated, and the party was left with only one county councillor, a loss of fifteen. Independents gained two seats, one Ratepayer and one Independent Conservative, but lost one and the Liberals lost the single seat they had had. Three other candidates also won seats.

== Election result ==
Buckinghamshire County Council election, 1977
Party	Seats	Gains	Losses	Net gain/loss	Seats %	Votes %	Votes	+/−
Conservative	64	18	0	+18	91.4	63.1		▲18.4
Independent	2	2	1	+1	2.9	5.3		▼4.5
Labour	1	0	15	-15	1.4	19.8		▼12.3
Liberal	0	0	1	-1	0.0	8.9		▼0.7
Others	3				4.3	2.8		▼0.9
