= 2013 Buckinghamshire County Council election =

2013 UK local government election

← 2009	2 May 2013	2017 →

All 49 seats to Buckinghamshire County Council 25 seats needed for a majority
	First party	Second party	Third party
Party	Conservative	UKIP	Liberal Democrats
Seats before	46	0	11
Seats won	36	6	5
Seat change	▼10	▲6	▼6
Popular vote	47,688	31,357	17,323
Percentage	41.05%	26.99%	14.91%
	Fourth party	Fifth party
Party	Labour	Independent
Seats before	0	0
Seats won	1	1
Seat change	▲1	▲1
Popular vote	13,304	4,450
Percentage	11.45%	3.83%
- Map showing the results of the 2013 Buckinghamshire County Council elections.
Council control before election
Conservative
Council control after election
Conservative

An election to Buckinghamshire County Council took place on 2 May 2013 as part of the 2013 United Kingdom local elections. 49 councillors were elected from electoral divisions which returned one county councillor each by first-past-the-post voting for a four-year term of office. Following a boundary review, the size of the council was reduced from 57 to 49 members for this election. No elections were held in Milton Keynes, which is a unitary authority outside the area covered by the County Council. The council continues to be administered on the Leader and Cabinet model. The Conservative Party won a reduced majority on the council.

All locally registered electors (British, Irish, Commonwealth and European Union citizens) who were aged 18 or over on Thursday 2 May 2013 were entitled to vote in the local elections. Those who were temporarily away from their ordinary address (for example, away working, on holiday, in student accommodation or in hospital) were also entitled to vote in the local elections, although those who had moved abroad and registered as overseas electors cannot vote in the local elections. It is possible to register to vote at more than one address (such as a university student who had a term-time address and lives at home during holidays) at the discretion of the local Electoral Register Office, but it remains an offence to vote more than once in the same local government election.

== Summary ==
Suffering the loss of 335 of 1451 councillors in simultaneous elections across England, the Conservative Party won 36 seats, and saw their majority on the council cut from 17 seats to 11. Meanwhile, the main opposition group on the council altered from the Liberal Democrats to UKIP who won their highest percentage of the vote since their 1993 formation, at 27%. The Labour Party won its first seat here since the 2005 election, in Buckingham West. Seven of twelve Liberal Democrats lost their seats, to Conservative, UKIP and Labour candidates. (Note: Many electoral division boundaries are approximate comparisons having seen boundary changes. Examples include West Wycombe, which was smaller and geographically included an enclaved electoral division which was excluded and was named: Stokenchurch, Radnage & West Wycombe) An independent candidate won the West Wycombe electoral division that replaced Stokenchurch, Radnage & West Wycombe.

== Results ==
2013 Buckinghamshire County Council election
Party	Seats	Gains	Losses	Net gain/loss	Seats %	Votes %	Votes	+/−
Conservative	36			-10	73.47	41.05	47,688	-7.41
UKIP	6			+6	12.25	26.99	31,357	+13.31
Liberal Democrats	5			-6	10.20	14.91	17,323	-13.60
Labour	1			+1	2.04	11.45	13,304	+5.43
Independent	1			+1	2.04	3.83	4,450	+1.97
Green	0			0	0.00	1.71	1,987	+0.64
TUSC	0			0	0.00	0.06	73	+0.06

The overall turnout was 30.2% with a total of 116,182 valid votes cast. A total of 533 ballots were rejected.

== Council Composition ==
Following the last election in 2009 the composition of the council was:

↓
46	11
Conservatives	Liberal Democrats

After the election, the composition of the council was:

↓
36	6	5	1	1
Conservatives	UKIP	Lib Dems	L	I

Lib Dems – Liberal Democrats
L – Labour Party
I – Independent

== Ward results ==
An asterisk denotes an incumbent seeking re-election.

=== Abbey ===
Abbey
Party	Candidate	Votes	%	±%
Conservative	Lesley Clarke*	793	47.3	−10.7
Labour	Riaz Ahmed	401	23.9	+11.5
UKIP	Bob Harris	379	22.6	+9.2
Liberal Democrats	Matt Knight	105	6.3	−9.8
Majority		392	23.4	−18.5
Turnout		1,678	24.1	−8.3
Conservative hold		Swing		

=== Amersham and Chesham Bois ===
Amersham and Chesham Bois
Party	Candidate	Votes	%	±%
Conservative	Martin Phillips*	1,251	51.5	
UKIP	Bev Weedon	533	22.0	
Liberal Democrats	Howard Maitland-Jones	411	16.9	
Labour	Robin Walters	232	9.6	
Majority		718	29.5	
Turnout		2,427	30.8	
Conservative win (new seat)				

Martin Phillips previously served as councillor for Amersham prior to the boundaries being changed before this set of elections.

=== Aston Clinton and Bierton ===
Aston Clinton and Bierton
Party	Candidate	Votes	%	±%
Conservative	Bill Chapple*	1,048	39.2	
UKIP	Nigel Hayward	975	36.4	
Liberal Democrats	Jonathan Gilpin	428	16.0	
Labour	Martin Abel	224	8.4	
Majority		73	2.7	
Turnout		2,675	35.2	
Conservative win (new seat)				

Bill Chapple previously served as councillor for Aston Clinton prior to the boundaries being changed before this set of elections.

=== Aylesbury East ===
Aylesbury East
Party	Candidate	Votes	%	±%
UKIP	Phil Gomm	1,027	35.6	
Conservative	Jenny Bloom	871	30.2	
Liberal Democrats	Steve Patrick	594	20.6	
Labour	Roy McNickle	363	12.6	
TUSC	Helen Tucker	31	1.1	
Majority		156	5.4	
Turnout		2,886	35.7	
UKIP win (new seat)				

=== Aylesbury North ===
Aylesbury North
Party	Candidate	Votes	%	±%
Liberal Democrats	Raj Khan*	820	33.6	
UKIP	Roger Huntley	616	25.3	
Labour Co-op	Mike Padmore	510	20.9	
Conservative	Edward Sims	493	20.2	
Majority		204	8.4	
Turnout		2,439	27.6	
Liberal Democrats win (new seat)				

Raj Khan previously served as councillor for Aylesbury East prior to the boundaries being changed before this set of elections.

=== Aylesbury North West ===
Aylesbury North West
Party	Candidate	Votes	%	±%
UKIP	Andy Huxley	939	44.8	
Liberal Democrats	Niknam Hussain*	543	25.9	
Labour	Michael Bell	312	14.9	
Conservative	Denise Summers	302	14.4	
Majority		396	18.9	
Turnout		2,096	24.6	
UKIP win (new seat)				

Niknam Hussain previously served as councillor for Aylesbury North prior to the boundaries being changed before this set of elections.

=== Aylesbury South East ===
Aylesbury South East
Party	Candidate	Votes	%	±%
Conservative	Brian Roberts*	994	39.9	−1.8
UKIP	Heather Adams	697	28.0	+15.5
Liberal Democrats	Mark Willis	363	14.6	−27.3
Labour	David Caldwell	326	13.1	+9.2
Green	Chris Peeler	112	4.5	
Majority		297	11.9	+11.7
Turnout		2,492	28.7	−21.1
Conservative gain from Liberal Democrats		Swing		

Brian Roberts previously served as councillor for Aylesbury South prior to the boundaries being changed before this set of elections.

=== Aylesbury South West ===
Aylesbury South West
Party	Candidate	Votes	%	±%
UKIP	Brian Adams	742	35.1	
Liberal Democrats	Freda Roberts*	689	32.6	
Labour	Mark Bateman	405	19.1	
Conservative	Sarah Sproat	237	11.2	
TUSC	Steve Bell	42	2.0	
Majority		53	2.5	
Turnout		2,115	27.2	
UKIP win (new seat)				

Freda Roberts previously served as councillor for Aylesbury West prior to the boundaries being changed before this set of elections.

=== Aylesbury West ===
Aylesbury West
Party	Candidate	Votes	%	±%
Liberal Democrats	Steven Lambert	921	41.6	
UKIP	Barry Cooper	702	31.7	
Conservative	Heather Wallace	333	15.0	
Labour	Lynda Greenhill	258	11.7	
Majority		219	9.9	
Turnout		2,214	27.3	
Liberal Democrats win (new seat)				

=== Beaconsfield ===
Beaconsfield
Party	Candidate	Votes	%	±%
Conservative	Adrian Busby*	1,366	60.6	−4.2
UKIP	Graham Smith	590	26.2	+12.5
Liberal Democrats	Carol Gibson	299	13.3	−3.8
Majority		776	34.4	−13.3
Turnout		2,255	27.8	−10.1
Conservative hold		Swing		

=== Bernwood ===
Bernwood
Party	Candidate	Votes	%	±%
Conservative	Margaret Aston*	1,197	44.0	−8.1
UKIP	William Bate	591	21.7	+9.0
Labour	Roderick Floud	428	15.7	
Green	David Lyons	348	12.8	
Liberal Democrats	Bette Melling	155	5.7	−29.5
Majority		606	22.3	+5.4
Turnout		2,719	35.1	−12.1
Conservative hold		Swing		

Margaret Aston previously served as councillor for Haddenham prior to the boundaries being changed before this set of elections.

=== Booker, Cressex & Castlefield ===
Booker, Cressex & Castlefield
Party	Candidate	Votes	%	±%
Conservative	Zahir Mohammed*	1,413	47.1	
Labour	Mohammed Hanif	848	28.3	
UKIP	Brian Pearce	385	12.8	
Liberal Democrats	Simon Parker	222	7.4	
Independent	Ricki Hussein	131	4.4	
Majority		565	18.8	
Turnout		2,999	37.3	
Conservative win (new seat)				

Zahir Mohammed previously served as councillor for Downley, Disraeli, Oakridge & Castlefield prior to the boundaries being changed before this set of elections.

=== Buckingham East ===
Buckingham East
Party	Candidate	Votes	%	±%
Conservative	Warren Whyte	838	44.2	
UKIP	John Russell	520	27.5	
Labour	Patrick Collins	449	23.7	
Liberal Democrats	Richard Lloyd	87	4.6	
Majority		318	16.8	
Turnout		1,894	24.4	
Conservative win (new seat)				

=== Buckingham West ===
Buckingham West
Party	Candidate	Votes	%	±%
Labour	Robin Stuchbury	927	40.0	
Conservative	Patrick Fealey	884	38.2	
UKIP	Sheila Sewell	385	16.6	
Liberal Democrats	Lucy Monger	119	5.1	
Majority		43	1.9	
Turnout		2,315	32.0	
Labour win (new seat)				

=== Chalfont St Giles ===
Chalfont St Giles
Party	Candidate	Votes	%	±%
Conservative	Timothy Butcher	1,159	45.6	
UKIP	Steven Babb	956	37.6	
Labour	Peter Hutchinson	223	8.8	
Liberal Democrats	Kaley Botting	206	8.1	
Majority		203	8.0	
Turnout		2,544	29.7	
Conservative win (new seat)				

Timothy Butcher previously served as councillor for The Chalfonts & Seer Green prior to the boundaries being changed before this set of elections.

=== Chalfont St Peter ===
Chalfont St Peter
Party	Candidate	Votes	%	±%
Conservative	David Martin	1,520	55.4	
UKIP	David Meacock	879	32.0	
Labour	Stephen Agar	178	6.5	
Liberal Democrats	David Rafferty	166	6.1	
Majority		641	23.4	
Turnout		2,743	32.9	
Conservative hold		Swing		

=== Chesham ===
Chesham
Party	Candidate	Votes	%	±%
Conservative	Mark Shaw	1,018	36.7	
Labour	Mohammad Bhatti*	756	27.2	
UKIP	Reg Amos	528	19.0	
Liberal Democrats	Alison Pirouet	322	11.6	
Green	Phil Folly	151	5.4	
Majority		262	9.5	
Turnout		2,775	36.6	
Conservative hold		Swing		

Mohmammad Bhatti previously served as Conservative councillor for Chesham East prior to the boundaries being changed before this set of elections.

=== Chess Valley ===
Chess Valley
Party	Candidate	Votes	%	±%
Conservative	Noel Brown*	1,165	47.5	−6.0
UKIP	Richard Ness	468	19.1	
Liberal Democrats	Mohammad Fayyaz	378	15.4	−10.3
Labour	David Cross	253	10.3	+3.1
Green	Rob Craig	187	7.6	−6.0
Majority		697	28.4	+0.6
Turnout		2,451	31.5	−8.9
Conservative hold		Swing		

=== Chiltern Ridges ===
Chiltern Ridges
Party	Candidate	Votes	%	±%
Conservative	Patricia Birchley*	1,223	36.8	−22.0
UKIP	Barry Kempson	1,135	34.2	+21.7
Liberal Democrats	Ruth Juett	559	16.8	+2.9
Green	Kate Folly	249	7.5	−1.4
Labour	Barbara Hunter	156	4.7	
Majority		88	2.6	−36.5
Turnout		3,322	40.3	−10.1
Conservative hold		Swing		

=== Chiltern Villages ===
Chiltern Villages
Party	Candidate	Votes	%	±%
Conservative	Jean Teesdale	1,367	57.6	
UKIP	Rita Luxton	567	23.9	
Labour	Peter Morris	227	9.6	
Liberal Democrats	Paul Lambourne	212	8.9	
Majority		800	33.7	
Turnout		2,373	28.2	
Conservative win (new seat)				

=== Cliveden ===
Cliveden
Party	Candidate	Votes	%	±%
Conservative	Dev Dhillon*	822	40.7	
UKIP	Ken Wight	778	38.5	
Labour	Samantha Memmott	263	13.0	
Liberal Democrats	David Lindsall	157	7.8	
Majority		44	2.2	
Turnout		2,020	27.3	
Conservative win (new seat)				

Dev Dhillon previously served as councillor for Taplow, Dorney & Lent Rise prior to the boundaries being changed before this set of elections.

=== Denham ===
Denham
Party	Candidate	Votes	%	±%
Conservative	Roger Reed*	942	53.4	
UKIP	Susan Fagan	657	37.2	
Liberal Democrats	Jeffrey Herschel	166	9.4	
Majority		285	16.2	
Turnout		1,765	24.8	
Conservative win (new seat)				

Roger Reed previously served as councillor for Gerards Cross & Denham North prior to the boundaries being changed before this set of elections.

=== Downley ===
Downley
Party	Candidate	Votes	%	±%
Conservative	Wendy Mallen*	1,053	42.8	
Labour	Mohammed Rafiq	750	30.5	
UKIP	Vijay Srao	427	17.3	
Liberal Democrats	Matt Brown	233	9.5	
Majority		303	12.3	
Turnout		2,463	31.7	
Conservative win (new seat)				

Wendy Mallen previously served as councillor for Downley, Disraeli, Oakridge & Castleford prior to the boundaries being changed before this set of elections.

=== Farnham Common & Burnham Beeches ===
Farnham Common & Burnham Beeches
Party	Candidate	Votes	%	±%
Conservative	Lin Hazell*	1,114	59.2	
UKIP	Paul Marshall	541	28.7	
Liberal Democrats	Jane Hartley	228	12.1	
Majority		573	30.5	
Turnout		1,883	26.9	
Conservative win (new seat)				

Lin Hazell previously served as councillor for Burnham Beeches prior to the boundaries being changed before this set of elections.

=== Flackwell Heath, Little Marlow & Marlow South East ===
Flackwell Heath, Little Marlow & Marlow South East
Party	Candidate	Votes	%	±%
Conservative	David Watson*	1,082	50.4	
UKIP	Tim Scott	482	22.4	
Green	Jem Bailey	212	9.9	
Liberal Democrats	Paul Burden	186	8.7	
Labour	Nigel Vickery	185	8.6	
Majority		600	28.0	
Turnout		2,147	25.5	
Conservative win (new seat)				

David Watson previously served as councillor for Thames prior to the boundaries being changed before this set of elections.

=== Gerrards Cross ===
Gerrards Cross
Party	Candidate	Votes	%	±%
Conservative	Peter Hardy*	881	47.2	
Independent	Chris Brown	586	31.4	
UKIP	John Fagan	302	16.2	
Liberal Democrats	Peter Chapman	98	5.2	
Majority		295	15.8	
Turnout		1,867	27.7	
Conservative win (new seat)				

Peter Hardy previously served as councillor for Bulstrode prior to the boundaries being changed before this set of elections.

=== Great Brickhill ===
Great Brickhill
Party	Candidate	Votes	%	±%
Conservative	Janet Blake	1,406	50.4	−10.2
UKIP	Ben Saunders	1,051	37.7	+23.7
Liberal Democrats	Julian Newman	330	11.8	−13.5
Majority		355	12.7	
Turnout		2,787	32.8	
Conservative hold		Swing		

=== Great Missenden ===
Great Missenden
Party	Candidate	Votes	%	±%
UKIP	Alan Stevens	1,243	40.7	+30.5
Conservative	Sonia Brock	1,151	37.7	−27.5
Independent	Rob Green	350	11.5	
Labour	Christopher Barr	186	6.1	+2.1
Liberal Democrats	Ruth Chenoweth	125	4.1	−16.6
Majority		92	3.0	−41.5
Turnout		3,055	37.3	−7.7
UKIP gain from Conservative		Swing		

=== Grendon Underwood ===
Grendon Underwood
Party	Candidate	Votes	%	±%
Conservative	Angela MacPherson	1,089	41.9	−1.9
UKIP	Dave Fowler	861	33.1	+6.8
Labour	Joanna Dodsworth	259	10.0	
Liberal Democrats	Ian Metherell	202	7.8	−22.1
Green	Clare Butler	189	7.3	N/A
Majority		228	8.8	−5.1
Turnout		2,600	31.0	−13.0
Conservative hold		Swing		

=== Hazlemere ===
Hazlemere
Party	Candidate	Votes	%	±%
Conservative	Katrina Wood	976	46.0	−16.5
UKIP	Brian Mapletoft	784	36.9	+23.9
Labour	Ian Bates	191	9.0	
Liberal Democrats	Wendy Guy	173	8.1	−12.3
Majority		192	9.1	−33.0
Turnout		2,124	28.9	−8.0
Conservative hold		Swing		

=== Iver ===
Iver
Party	Candidate	Votes	%	±%
Conservative	Ruth Vigor-Hedderly*	955	45.1	+3.5
Liberal Democrats	Alan Oxley	650	30.7	−8.5
UKIP	Adam Pamment	512	24.2	+5.0
Majority		305	14.4	+12.0
Turnout		2,117	26.5	−12.8
Conservative hold		Swing		

=== Ivinghoe ===
Ivinghoe
Party	Candidate	Votes	%	±%
Liberal Democrats	Avril Davies*	1,032	38.1	−9.8
Conservative	Chris Poll	947	35.0	−5.7
UKIP	Nicholas Griffin	534	19.7	+8.3
Labour	Robert Kempster	193	7.1	
Majority		85	3.1	−4.1
Turnout		2,706	33.3	−13.5
Liberal Democrats hold		Swing		

=== Little Chalfont & Amersham Common ===
Little Chalfont & Amersham Common
Party	Candidate	Votes	%	±%
Conservative	Martin Tett*	1,171	53.2	
UKIP	Christopher Cooke	542	24.6	
Liberal Democrats	Richard Williams	289	13.1	
Labour	John Harris	198	9.0	
Majority		629	28.6	
Turnout		2,200	29.2	
Conservative win (new seat)				

Martin Tett previously served as councillor for The Chalfonts & Seer Green prior to the boundaries being changed before this set of elections.

=== Marlow ===
Marlow
Party	Candidate	Votes	%	±%
Conservative	Richard Scott*	1,395	57.5	
UKIP	Penny Hill	501	20.6	
Liberal Democrats	Nicholas Jarrett	307	12.6	
Labour	Helen Ingram	224	9.2	
Majority		894	36.9	
Turnout		2,427	29.7	
Conservative hold		Swing		

=== Penn Wood & Old Amersham ===
Penn Wood & Old Amersham
Party	Candidate	Votes	%	±%
Conservative	David Schofield*	1,531	54.9	
UKIP	Michael Hurley	744	26.7	
Liberal Democrats	Barbara Mallinder	296	10.6	
Labour	Ruth Werbiski	219	7.8	
Majority		787	32.4	
Turnout		2,790	32.4	
Conservative win (new seat)				

David Schofield previously served as councillor for Penn, Coleshill & Holmer Green prior to the boundaries being changed before this set of elections.

=== Ridgeway East ===
Ridgeway East
Party	Candidate	Votes	%	±%
Conservative	David Carroll*	1,338	49.2	
UKIP	Nick Morris	1,040	38.2	
Labour	Ron Gardner	185	6.8	
Liberal Democrats	Allison Harrison	159	5.8	
Majority		298	11.0	
Turnout		2,722	32.2	
Conservative win (new seat)				

David Carroll previously served as councillor for Hazlemere prior to the boundaries being changed before this set of elections.

=== Ridgeway West ===
Ridgeway West
Party	Candidate	Votes	%	±%
Conservative	Carl Etholen*	1,165	55.3	
UKIP	Helen Shingleton	511	24.2	
Green	Sally Fisher	189	9.0	
Labour	Jo Caldwell	135	6.4	
Liberal Democrats	Michael Smith	108	5.1	
Majority		654	31.1	
Turnout		2,108	27.5	
Conservative win (new seat)				

Carl Etholen previously served as councillor for The Risborough prior to the boundaries being changed before this set of elections.

=== Ryemead & Micklefield ===
Ryemead & Micklefield
Party	Candidate	Votes	%	±%
Liberal Democrats	Julia Wassell*	870	54.2	
Conservative	Mark Harris	252	15.7	
Labour	Martin Bradshaw	238	14.8	
UKIP	Pauline Day	194	12.1	
Green	Ivan Cicin-Sain	50	3.1	
Majority		618	38.5	
Turnout		1,604	23.1	
Liberal Democrats win (new seat)				

Julia Wassell previously served as councillor for Bowerdean, Micklefield & Totteridge prior to the boundaries being changed before this set of elections.

=== Stoke Poges & Wexham ===
Stoke Poges & Wexham
Party	Candidate	Votes	%	±%
Conservative	Trevor Egleton*	1,073	53.3	
UKIP	John Davis	616	30.6	
Labour	John Hunter	194	9.6	
Liberal Democrats	Chris Woolley	131	6.5	
Majority		457	22.7	
Turnout		2,014	25.8	
Conservative win (new seat)				

Trevor Egleton previously served as councillor for Stoke Poges & Farnham Common prior to the boundaries being changed before this set of elections.

=== Stone and Waddesdon ===
Stone and Waddesdon
Party	Candidate	Votes	%	±%
UKIP	Paul Irwin	606	27.4	
Liberal Democrats	David Vick	576	26.1	
Conservative	Clive Harriss	569	25.7	
Independent	Mark Bale	460	20.8	
Majority		30	1.4	
Turnout		2,211	36.4	
UKIP win (new seat)				

=== Terriers & Amersham Hill ===
Terriers & Amersham Hill
Party	Candidate	Votes	%	±%
Conservative	Valerie Letheren*	949	51.7	−3.9
Labour	Joseph Manomano	347	18.9	−8.4
UKIP	Barbara Adams	319	17.4	+6.0
Liberal Democrats	Chaudhry Mahmood	222	12.1	−10.3
Majority		602	32.8	−0.4
Turnout		1,837	25.1	−8.7
Conservative hold		Swing		

=== The Risboroughs ===
The Risboroughs
Party	Candidate	Votes	%	±%
Conservative	Bill Bendyshe-Brown	910	36.9	−5.7
Independent	Alan Turner	770	31.2	−8.3
UKIP	Kate Rixon	580	23.5	+16.5
Labour	Jef Abbott	144	5.8	
Liberal Democrats	Gerald Harmsworth	63	2.6	−8.3
Majority		140	5.7	+2.6
Turnout		2,467	32.5	−7.3
Conservative hold		Swing		

=== The Wooburns, Bourne End & Hedsor ===
The Wooburns, Bourne End & Hedsor
Party	Candidate	Votes	%	±%
Conservative	Michael Appleyard*	979	46.0	
UKIP	Joan Martin	482	22.7	
Liberal Democrats	Brian Pollock	457	21.5	
Labour	Christina Gradowski	209	9.8	
Majority		497	23.3	
Turnout		2,127	26.4	
Conservative win (new seat)				

Michael Appleyard previously served as councillor for Thames prior to the boundaries being changed before this set of elections.

=== Totteridge & Bowerdean ===
Totteridge & Bowerdean
Party	Candidate	Votes	%	±%
Liberal Democrats	Chaudhary Ditta*	953	38.7	
Labour	Ghalib Hussain	671	27.3	
Conservative	Tony Green	482	19.6	
UKIP	Philip Whitehead	354	14.4	
Majority		282	11.4	
Turnout		2,460	32.1	
Liberal Democrats win (new seat)				

Chaudhary Ditta previously served as councillor for Bowerdean, Micklefield & Totteridge prior to the boundaries being changed before this set of elections.

=== Tylers Green & Loudwater ===
Tylers Green & Loudwater
Party	Candidate	Votes	%	±%
Conservative	David Shakespeare*	911	43.5	
UKIP	Richard Postles	590	28.2	
Liberal Democrats	Trevor Snaith	392	18.7	
Labour	Mark Ferris	201	9.6	
Majority		321	15.3	
Turnout		2,094	25.7	
Conservative win (new seat)				

David Shakespeare previously served as councillor for Ryemead, Tylers Green & Loudwater prior to the boundaries being changed before this set of elections.

=== Wendover, Halton & Stoke Mandeville ===
Wendover, Halton and Stoke Mandeville
Party	Candidate	Votes	%	±%
UKIP	Chris Adams	1,085	36.3	
Independent	Chris Richards	768	25.7	
Conservative	Steve Bowles	720	24.1	
Labour	Philip McGoldrick	175	5.9	
Green	Sue Hetherington	145	4.9	
Liberal Democrats	Peter Vernon	96	3.2	
Majority		317	10.6	
Turnout		2,989	36.6	
UKIP win (new seat)				

=== West Wycombe ===
West Wycombe
Party	Candidate	Votes	%	±%
Independent	Darren Hayday	587	30.3	
Conservative	Ian McEnnis	480	24.7	
UKIP	Hedley Luxton	396	20.4	
Labour	Henry Oriabure	310	16.0	
Liberal Democrats	Neil Timberlake	167	8.6	
Majority		107	5.6	
Turnout		1,940	28.2	
Independent win (new seat)				

=== Wing ===
Wing
Party	Candidate	Votes	%	±%
Conservative	Netta Glover*	920	34.4	−6.7
Independent	Peter Cooper	798	29.8	−2.2
UKIP	John Jeffries	550	20.6	+9.3
Liberal Democrats	Alan Sherwell	217	8.1	−7.4
Labour	John Thwaites	191	7.1	
Majority		122	4.6	
Turnout		2,676	31.5	
Conservative hold		Swing		

=== Winslow ===
Winslow
Party	Candidate	Votes	%	±%
Conservative	John Chilver	953	37.1	−11.2
Liberal Democrats	Llew Monger	841	32.7	−5.4
UKIP	John Day	461	17.9	+4.3
Labour	Jon Harvey	160	6.2	
Green	Mary Hunt	155	6.0	
Majority		112	4.4	
Turnout		2,570	34.6	
Conservative hold		Swing		
