= Bowerdean, Micklefield and Totteridge =

Coordinates: 51.631°N 0.715°W

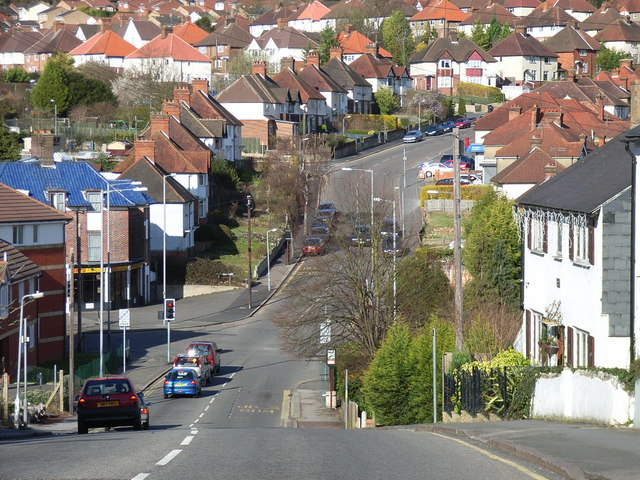
Totteridge Road, High Wycombe, 2006

Bowerdean, Micklefield and Totteridge was an electoral division of Buckinghamshire County Council in Buckinghamshire, England from 2005 to 2013.

It was a two-seat constituency and at the 2005 election Julia Wassell and Chaudhary Ditta, both representing the Labour Party were returned. In 2008, Julia Wassell and Chaudhary Ditta both switched their allegiance to the Liberal Democrats.
