= Armagh Area D =

District electoral areas in Armagh, Northern Ireland

Armagh Area D was one of the four district electoral areas in Armagh, Northern Ireland which existed from 1973 to 1985. The district elected five members to Armagh District Council, and formed part of the Armagh constituencies for the Northern Ireland Assembly and UK Parliament.

It was created for the 1973 local elections, and contained the wards of Demesne, Downs, Lisanally, Lurgyvallen and The Mall. It was abolished for the 1985 local elections and replaced by the Armagh City DEA.

== Councillors ==
Election	Councillor (Party)	Councillor (Party)	Councillor (Party)	Councillor (Party)	Councillor (Party)
1981	Frederick Armstrong (UUP)	George Macartney (UUP)	Pat Brannigan (SDLP)	John Agnew (SDLP)	Bernard McManus (Independent Nationalist)/ (SDLP)
1977	Frederick Armstrong (UUP)	Norman Creswell (UUP)	Pat Brannigan (SDLP)	Oliver Tobin (SDLP)	Bernard McManus (Independent Nationalist)/ (SDLP)
1973	Frederick Armstrong (UUP)	Norman Creswell (UUP)	Robert Mercer (UUP)	Oliver Tobin (SDLP)	Bernard McManus (Independent Nationalist)/ (SDLP)

== 1981 Election ==
1977: 2 x SDLP, 2 x UUP, 1 x Independent Nationalist

1981: 2 x SDLP, 2 x UUP, 1 x Independent Nationalist

1977-1981 Change: No change

Armagh Area D - 6 seats
Party	Candidate	FPv%	Count							
Party	Candidate	FPv%	1	2	3	4	5	6	7	8
UUP	Frederick Armstrong*	20.95%	1,173							
Ind. Nationalist	Bernard McManus*	18.06%	1,011							
SDLP	Pat Brannigan*	14.41%	807	808.4	832.8	854.22	857.22	1,224.22		
SDLP	John Agnew	11.02%	617	617.4	646.6	672.59	675.59	887.39	1,174.49	
UUP	George Macartney	7.02%	393	457.8	469	469.18	820.58	822.87	823.74	855.93
DUP	Letitia McClenaghan	11.66%	653	667.6	671.6	671.78	713.78	716.07	716.07	719.55
SDLP	Gerald Grimley	10.14%	568	568.2	593.4	619.41	620.61			
UUP	Norman Creswell*	4.34%	243	394.4	405.4	405.58				
Independent Labour	Carson Greer	2.39%	134	134.8						
Electorate: 8,699 Valid: 5,599 (64.36%) Spoilt: 228 Quota: 934 Turnout: 5,827 (66.98%)

== 1977 Election ==
1973: 3 x UUP, 2 x SDLP

1977: 2 x UUP, 2 x SDLP, 1 x Independent Nationalist

1973-1977 Change: SDLP gain from UUP, Independent Nationalist leaves SDLP

Armagh Area D - 6 seats
Party	Candidate	FPv%	Count								
Party	Candidate	FPv%	1	2	3	4	5	6	7	8	9
UUP	Frederick Armstrong*	19.17%	1,008								
Ind. Nationalist	Bernard McManus*	15.96%	839	839.78	866.91	866.91	896.91				
SDLP	Oliver Tobin*	13.05%	686	686	711	712.13	784.52	981.52			
UUP	Norman Creswell*	7.51%	395	481.84	485.84	697.65	807.47	808.47	1,124.47		
SDLP	Pat Brannigan	9.76%	513	513.78	528.78	531.78	555.91	658.04	660.3	673.3	765.7
Republican Clubs	Patrick Houlahan	9.64%	507	507	546	547	553	582	583.39	590.39	602.39
DUP	Letitia McClenaghan	7.04%	370	374.42	374.55	385.72	394.24	394.24			
SDLP	James McAvinchey	5.67%	298	298.26	317.26	318.26	339.39				
Alliance	Norah Dawson	5.17%	272	274.73	302.99	309.03					
UUP	Robert Mercer*	3.80%	200	233.41	237.54						
Independent Labour	Paddy Grimes	3.21%	169	169.65							
Electorate: 8,619 Valid: 5,257 (60.99%) Spoilt: 240 Quota: 877 Turnout: 5,497 (63.78%)

== 1973 Election ==
1973: 3 x UUP, 2 x SDLP

Armagh Area D - 6 seats
Party	Candidate	FPv%	Count													
Party	Candidate	FPv%	1	2	3	4	5	6	7	8	9	10	11	12	13	14
UUP	Frederick Armstrong	27.69%	1,584													
SDLP	Bernard McManus	11.63%	665	665	668	677	678	684	711	749	822	827	837	1,071		
UUP	Robert Mercer	8.27%	473	779.54	779.54	779.54	779.54	779.54	781.54	781.54	781.54	802.85	802.85	805.85	910.12	
SDLP	Oliver Tobin	7.06%	404	404.39	404.39	406.39	406.39	407.39	427.39	436.39	534.39	540.39	544.39	675.39	875.39	984.58
UUP	Norman Creswell	8.41%	481	772.72	772.72	773.5	773.5	773.5	775.89	780.06	780.06	790.93	794.62	797.62	888.91	888.91
Republican Clubs	Patrick Houlahan	4.65%	266	266	275	276	297	368	377	398	403	405	720	747	769	775.71
Alliance	J. Fitzgerald	4.81%	275	282.8	282.8	287.8	287.8	288.8	309.8	313.8	323.8	523.75	530.75	553.75		
SDLP	T. M. McIntegart	5.26%	301	301	305	311	314	321	350	369	417	423	431			
Republican Clubs	A. P. Cassin	4.62%	264	264.39	270.39	271.39	297.39	323.39	327.39	365.39	367.39	369.39				
Alliance	M. K. Lamb	3.85%	220	227.02	227.02	227.41	227.41	229.41	251.41	251.41	258.41					
SDLP	M. M. McReynolds	4.04%	231	231	231	232	233	234	244	246						
Unity	Patrick Agnew	2.67%	153	154.17	164.17	165.17	167.17	171.17	177.17							
NI Labour	Paddy Grimes	2.48%	142	142.39	142.39	164.39	164.39	164.39								
Republican Clubs	J. Trainor	1.80%	103	103	104	105	120									
Republican Clubs	E. P. Reilly	1.22%	70	70	71	71										
NI Labour	G. J. McCreesh	0.89%	51	52.17	52.17											
Independent	G. R. Mackey	0.65%	37	37												
Electorate: 8,434 Valid: 5,720 (67.82%) Spoilt: 122 Quota: 954 Turnout: 5,842 (69.27%)
