= Armagh Area B =

District electoral areas in Armagh, Northern Ireland

Armagh Area B was one of the four district electoral areas in Armagh, Northern Ireland which existed from 1973 to 1985. The district elected six members to Armagh District Council, and formed part of the Armagh constituencies for the Northern Ireland Assembly and UK Parliament.

It was created for the 1973 local elections, and contained the wards of Killeen, Laurelvale, Markethill, Poyntz Pass, Richhill and Tandragee. It was abolished for the 1985 local elections and replaced by the Cusher DEA.

== Councillors ==
Election	Councillor (Party)	Councillor (Party)	Councillor (Party)	Councillor (Party)	Councillor (Party)	Councillor (Party)
1981	Thomas Black (DUP)	Francis Little (UUUP)	Jim Speers (UUP)	William McClelland (UUP)	Robert Turner (UUP)	Seamus Mallon (SDLP)
1977	Thomas Black (DUP)	Francis Little (UUUP)	Jim Speers (UUP)	William McClelland (UUP)	William Henning (UUP)	Seamus Mallon (SDLP)
1973	Thomas Black (DUP)	Nathaniel McMahon (UUP)	Nelson Huddleston (UUP)	Andrew Crothers (UUP)	William Henning (UUP)	Seamus Mallon (SDLP)

== 1981 Election ==
1977: 3 x UUP, 1 x DUP, 1 x SDLP, 1 x UUUP

1981: 3 x UUP, 1 x DUP, 1 x SDLP, 1 x UUUP

1977-1981 Change: No change

Armagh Area B - 6 seats
Party	Candidate	FPv%	Count						
Party	Candidate	FPv%	1	2	3	4	5	6	7
UUP	Jim Speers*	22.40%	1,931						
SDLP	Seamus Mallon*	16.17%	1,394						
UUP	William McClelland*	12.67%	1,092	1,264.8					
DUP	Thomas Black*	10.64%	917	955.16	959.88	963.38	1,170.16	1,843.16	
UUUP	Francis Little*	8.49%	732	768.72	808.08	819.98	867.52	895.84	1,189.84
UUP	Robert Turner	8.61%	742	967	968.72	1,033.12	1,054.48	1,087.38	1,178.38
UUP	Thomas Johnston	8.50%	733	891.4	902.2	970.8	994.04	1,026.44	1,143.44
DUP	John Alexander	6.51%	561	573.96	576.4	582	787.96		
DUP	Mervyn Spratt	5.32%	459	498.96	503.96	511.66			
UUUP	Frederick Hamilton	0.68%	59	65.48					
Electorate: 10,993 Valid: 8,620 (78.41%) Spoilt: 160 Quota: 1,232 Turnout: 8,780 (79.87%)

== 1977 Election ==
1973: 4 x UUP, 1 x DUP, 1 x SDLP

1977: 3 x UUP, 1 x DUP, 1 x SDLP, 1 x UUUP

1973-1977 Change: UUUP gain from UUP

Armagh Area B - 6 seats
Party	Candidate	FPv%	Count							
Party	Candidate	FPv%	1	2	3	4	5	6	7	8
UUP	William Henning*	16.55%	1,177							
SDLP	Seamus Mallon*	15.35%	1,092							
DUP	Thomas Black*	15.14%	1,077							
UUP	William McClelland	13.51%	961	1,044.85						
UUUP	Francis Little	7.79%	554	561.93	562.23	572.43	659.79	662.24	977.33	988.36
UUP	Jim Speers	9.86%	701	727.39	727.49	729.49	745.3	754.15	807.96	895.12
UUP	George Parks	7.21%	513	539.65	539.85	544.5	555.78	572.53	622.83	794.32
Alliance	James McAfee	4.37%	311	311.91	360.31	360.51	361.51	530.1	530.1	
DUP	Mervyn Spratt	5.58%	397	398.69	398.69	430.34	454.26	455.46		
Alliance	Christina Glendinning	2.64%	188	190.6	210.7	211.5	214.65			
UUUP	David Robb	2.00%	142	143.43	143.43	147.03				
Electorate: 10,579 Valid: 7,113 (67.24%) Spoilt: 257 Quota: 1,017 Turnout: 7,370 (69.67%)

== 1973 Election ==
1973: 4 x UUP, 1 x DUP, 1 x SDLP

Armagh Area B - 6 seats
Party	Candidate	FPv%	Count							
Party	Candidate	FPv%	1	2	3	4	5	6	7	8
DUP	Thomas Black	20.51%	1,525							
UUP	Nathaniel McMahon	16.26%	1,209							
SDLP	Seamus Mallon	14.41%	1,071							
UUP	William Henning	14.10%	1,048	1,168.45						
UUP	Nelson Huddleston	10.17%	756	838.5	890.46	929.76	931.76	961.08	994.87	1,127.87
UUP	Andrew Crothers	6.66%	495	646.14	687.06	729.66	729.99	748.44	763.25	942.29
UUP	Thomas Hutchinson	6.40%	476	543.32	586.64	607.64	609.76	642.93	678.69	781.7
Alliance	Austin Best	4.32%	321	326.61	328.17	328.47	334.8	416.57	638.41	
Alliance	John Lamb	3.23%	240	249.24	252.6	252.9	267.9	329.9		
Alliance	Harden Glendinning	1.56%	116	119.63	120.35	120.35	141.47			
Independent	Robert Newell	1.30%	97	108.55	110.95	112.15	112.15			
NI Labour	Eamon McCann	1.08%	80	80.66	81.02	81.02				
Electorate: 9,667 Valid: 7,434 (76.90%) Spoilt: 115 Quota: 1,063 Turnout: 7,549 (78.09%)
