= Armagh Area C =

District electoral areas in Armagh, Northern Ireland

Armagh Area C was one of the four district electoral areas in Armagh, Northern Ireland which existed from 1973 to 1985. The district elected five members to Armagh District Council, and formed part of the Armagh constituencies for the Northern Ireland Assembly and UK Parliament.

It was created for the 1973 local elections, and contained the wards of Carriagatuke, Derrynoose, Keady, Killylea and Milford. It was abolished for the 1985 local elections and replaced by the Crossmore DEA.

== Councillors ==
Election	Councillor (Party)	Councillor (Party)	Councillor (Party)	Councillor (Party)	Councillor (Party)
1981	Joseph McBride (DUP)	Jim Nicholson (UUP)	Patrick Fegan (SDLP)	James McKernan (SDLP)	Joseph Dunleavy (SDLP)
1977	Eleanor Boyd (UUP)	Jim Nicholson (UUP)	Patrick Fegan (SDLP)	James McKernan (SDLP)	Joseph Fullerton (SDLP)
1973	J. Reid (UUP)	W. Shilliday (UUP)	Patrick Fegan (SDLP)	M. Cunningham (SDLP)	Eugene Connolly (Alliance)

== 1981 Election ==
1977: 3 x SDLP, 2 x UUP

1981: 3 x SDLP, 1 x UUP, 1 x DUP

1977-1981 Change: DUP gain from UUP

Armagh Area C - 5 seats
Party	Candidate	FPv%	Count			
Party	Candidate	FPv%	1	2	3	4
SDLP	Patrick Fegan*	17.55%	980			
UUP	Jim Nicholson*	17.23%	962			
SDLP	James McKernan*	16.71%	933			
DUP	Joseph McBride	12.63%	705	705.35	709.4	1,041.4
SDLP	Joseph Dunleavy	12.36%	690	729.35	853.9	867.9
Irish Independence	Patrick Agnew	8.83%	493	495.6	629.9	633.95
UUP	Eleanor Boyd*	8.06%	450	450.35	462.35	
Independent	Peter McSorley	6.63%	370	373.9		
Electorate: 7,281 Valid: 5,583 (76.68%) Spoilt: 207 Quota: 931 Turnout: 5,790 (79.52%)

== 1977 Election ==
1973: 2 x SDLP, 2 x UUP, 1 x Alliance

1977: 3 x SDLP, 2 x UUP

1973-1977 Change: SDLP gain from Alliance

Armagh Area C - 5 seats
Party	Candidate	FPv%	Count			
Party	Candidate	FPv%	1	2	3	4
UUP	Eleanor Boyd	23.24%	1,153			
SDLP	Patrick Fegan*	19.27%	956			
SDLP	James McKernan	17.66%	876			
UUP	Jim Nicholson	13.71%	680	985.08		
SDLP	Joseph Fullerton	14.82%	735	737.61	741.09	851.13
Alliance	Eugene Connolly*	11.31%	561	575.21	691.5	708.3
Electorate: 7,216 Valid: 4,961 (68.75%) Spoilt: 280 Quota: 827 Turnout: 5,241 (72.63%)

== 1973 Election ==
1973: 2 x SDLP, 2 x UUP, 1 x Alliance

Armagh Area C - 5 seats
Party	Candidate	FPv%	Count					
Party	Candidate	FPv%	1	2	3	4	5	6
UUP	J. Reid	28.39%	1,544					
SDLP	Patrick Fegan	17.93%	975					
UUP	W. Shilliday	15.66%	852	1,474.79				
SDLP	M. Cunningham	11.33%	616	616.82	618.46	653.88	895.25	1,026.25
Alliance	Eugene Connolly	7.04%	383	385.46	559.3	563.78	584.89	696.09
Independent	E. Conroy	8.99%	489	489.41	494.74	501.25	521.36	571.52
NI Labour	J. Fullerton	5.11%	278	281.69	334.99	340.87	363.77	
SDLP	P. Nugent	5.55%	302	302.41	303.23	318.7		
Electorate: 7,398 Valid: 5,439 (73.52%) Spoilt: 166 Quota: 907 Turnout: 5,605 (75.76%)
