= Armagh Area A =

District electoral areas in Armagh, Northern Ireland

Armagh Area A was one of the four district electoral areas in Armagh, Northern Ireland which existed from 1973 to 1985. The district elected four members to Armagh District Council, and formed part of the Armagh constituencies for the Northern Ireland Assembly and UK Parliament.

It was created for the 1973 local elections, and contained the wards of Ballymartin, Charlemont, Hockley and Loughgall. It was abolished for the 1985 local elections and replaced by The Orchard DEA.

== Councillors ==
Election	Councillor (Party)	Councillor (Party)	Councillor (Party)	Councillor (Party)
1981	Douglas Hutchinson (DUP)	Samuel Foster (UUP)	Ronald Allen (UUP)	Francis McIlvanna (SDLP)
1977	Douglas Hutchinson (DUP)	Samuel Foster (UUP)	Mary Huey (UUP)	Francis McIlvanna (SDLP)
1973	Douglas Hutchinson (DUP)	Samuel Foster (UUP)	Mary Huey (UUP)	D. Magee (Independent)

== 1981 Election ==
1977: 2 x UUP, 1 x SDLP, 1 x DUP

1981: 2 x UUP, 1 x SDLP, 1 x DUP

1977-1981 Change: No change

Armagh Area A - 4 seats
Party	Candidate	FPv%	Count		
Party	Candidate	FPv%	1	2	3
UUP	Ronald Allen	22.78%	938		
DUP	Douglas Hutchinson*	21.32%	878		
UUP	Samuel Foster*	14.81%	610	844	
SDLP	Francis McIlvanna*	18.97%	781	784	804
SDLP	Francis Kernan	14.40%	593	599	676
DUP	Norman Kerr	5.93%	244		
UUUP	Robert Cummings	1.80%	74		
Electorate: 5,833 Valid: 4,118 (70.60%) Spoilt: 178 Quota: 824 Turnout: 4,296 (73.65%)

== 1977 Election ==
1973: 2 x UUP, 1 x DUP, 1 x Independent

1977: 2 x UUP, 1 x DUP, 1 x SDLP

1973-1977 Change: SDLP gain from Independent

Armagh Area A - 4 seats
Party	Candidate	FPv%	Count			
Party	Candidate	FPv%	1	2	3	4
DUP	Douglas Hutchinson*	23.00%	821			
UUP	Mary Huey*	19.27%	688	785		
UUP	Samuel Foster*	17.93%	640	738		
SDLP	Francis McIlvanna	17.70%	632	633	650	651
SDLP	Francis Kernan	15.49%	553	561	598	605
UUUP	Noel Lyttle	6.61%	236			
Electorate: 5,767 Valid: 3,570 (61.90%) Spoilt: 222 Quota: 715 Turnout: 3,792 (65.75%)

== 1973 Election ==
1973: 2 x UUP, 1 x DUP, 1 x Independent

Armagh Area A - 4 seats
Party	Candidate	FPv%	Count							
Party	Candidate	FPv%	1	2	3	4	5	6	7	8
DUP	Douglas Hutchinson	24.83%	1,076							
UUP	Mary Huey	16.87%	731	847.55	849.97	849.97	930.97			
UUP	Samuel Foster	17.44%	756	837.9	837.9	837.9	876.9			
Independent	D. Magee	11.14%	483	484.05	517.26	528.26	570.73	590.73	680.94	795.94
SDLP	Francis McIlvanna	8.84%	383	383	398	415.21	435.21	437.21	606.21	729.21
Republican Clubs	T. C. McGleenan	3.39%	147	147	198	320	323	323	349	
SDLP	S. R. D. Coyle	5.81%	252	252	263	267	302.21	303.21		
Alliance	R. W. Anderson	5.31%	230	235.46	237.46	238.46				
Republican Clubs	P. McCusker	3.32%	144	144.21	157.21					
Republican Clubs	M. J. Toal	1.75%	76	76						
NI Labour	P. Hunter	0.74%	32	32.84						
Independent	P. Fox	0.55%	24	24						
Electorate: 5,667 Valid: 4,334 (76.48%) Spoilt: 88 Quota: 867 Turnout: 4,422 (78.03%)
