= 1977 Armagh District Council election =

Local govt election in Northern Ireland

← 1973	18 May 1977	1981 →

All 20 seats to Armagh District Council 11 seats needed for a majority
	First party	Second party	Third party
Party	UUP	SDLP	DUP
Seats won	9	7	2
Seat change	▼2	▲2	0
	Fourth party	Fifth party	Sixth party
Party	UUUP	Ind. Nationalist	Alliance
Seats won	1	1	0
Seat change	▲1	▲1	▼1
	Seventh party
Party	Independent
Seats won	0
Seat change	▼1

Elections to Armagh District Council were held on 18 May 1977 on the same day as the other Northern Irish local government elections. The election used four district electoral areas to elect a total of 20 councillors.

== Election results ==
Armagh District Council Election Result 1977
Party	Seats	Gains	Losses	Net gain/loss	Seats %	Votes %	Votes	+/−
UUP	9	0	2	▼2	45.0	38.8	8,116	▼6.6
SDLP	7	2	0	▲2	35.0	30.3	6,341	▲7.6
DUP	2	0	0	0	10.0	12.8	2,665	▲1.5
UUUP	1	1	0	▲1	5.0	4.5	932	New
Ind. Nationalist	1	1	0	▲1	5.0	4.0	839	▲4.0
Alliance	0	0	1	▼1	0.0	6.4	1,332	▼1.4
Republican Clubs	0	0	0	0	0.0	2.4	507	▼2.3
Independent	0	0	0	0	0.0	0.8	169	▼4.1

Note: "Votes" are the first preference votes.

== Districts summary ==
Results of the Armagh District Council election, 1977 by district
Ward	%	Cllrs	%	Cllrs	%	Cllrs	%	Cllrs	%	Cllrs	Total Cllrs
Ward	UUP		SDLP		DUP		UUUP		Others		Total Cllrs
Area A	37.2	2	33.2	1	23.0	1	6.6	0	0.0	0	4
Area B	47.1	3	15.4	1	20.7	1	9.8	1	7.0	0	6
Area C	36.9	2	51.7	3	0.0	0	0.0	0	11.4	0	5
Area D	30.5	2	28.5	2	7.0	0	0.0	0	34.0	1	5
Total	38.8	9	30.3	7	12.8	2	4.5	1	13.6	1	20

== Districts results ==
=== Area A ===
1973: 2 x UUP, 1 x DUP, 1 x Independent
1977: 2 x UUP, 1 x DUP, 1 x SDLP
1973-1977 Change: SDLP gain from Independent

Armagh Area A - 4 seats
Party	Candidate	FPv%	Count			
Party	Candidate	FPv%	1	2	3	4
DUP	Douglas Hutchinson*	23.00%	821			
UUP	Mary Huey*	19.27%	688	785		
UUP	Samuel Foster*	17.93%	640	738		
SDLP	Francis McIlvanna	17.70%	632	633	650	651
SDLP	Francis Kernan	15.49%	553	561	598	605
UUUP	Noel Lyttle	6.61%	236			
Electorate: 5,767 Valid: 3,570 (61.90%) Spoilt: 222 Quota: 715 Turnout: 3,792 (65.75%)

=== Area B ===
1973: 4 x UUP, 1 x DUP, 1 x SDLP
1977: 3 x UUP, 1 x DUP, 1 x SDLP, 1 x UUUP
1973-1977 Change: UUUP gain from UUP

Armagh Area B - 6 seats
Party	Candidate	FPv%	Count							
Party	Candidate	FPv%	1	2	3	4	5	6	7	8
UUP	William Henning*	16.55%	1,177							
SDLP	Seamus Mallon*	15.35%	1,092							
DUP	Thomas Black*	15.14%	1,077							
UUP	William McClelland	13.51%	961	1,044.85						
UUUP	Francis Little	7.79%	554	561.93	562.23	572.43	659.79	662.24	977.33	988.36
UUP	Jim Speers	9.86%	701	727.39	727.49	729.49	745.3	754.15	807.96	895.12
UUP	George Parks	7.21%	513	539.65	539.85	544.5	555.78	572.53	622.83	794.32
Alliance	James McAfee	4.37%	311	311.91	360.31	360.51	361.51	530.1	530.1	
DUP	Mervyn Spratt	5.58%	397	398.69	398.69	430.34	454.26	455.46		
Alliance	Christina Glendinning	2.64%	188	190.6	210.7	211.5	214.65			
UUUP	David Robb	2.00%	142	143.43	143.43	147.03				
Electorate: 10,579 Valid: 7,113 (67.24%) Spoilt: 257 Quota: 1,017 Turnout: 7,370 (69.67%)

=== Area C ===
1973: 2 x SDLP, 2 x UUP, 1 x Alliance
1977: 3 x SDLP, 2 x UUP
1973-1977 Change: SDLP gain from Alliance

Armagh Area C - 5 seats
Party	Candidate	FPv%	Count			
Party	Candidate	FPv%	1	2	3	4
UUP	Eleanor Boyd	23.24%	1,153			
SDLP	Patrick Fegan*	19.27%	956			
SDLP	James McKernan	17.66%	876			
UUP	Jim Nicholson	13.71%	680	985.08		
SDLP	Joseph Fullerton	14.82%	735	737.61	741.09	851.13
Alliance	Eugene Connolly*	11.31%	561	575.21	691.5	708.3
Electorate: 7,216 Valid: 4,961 (68.75%) Spoilt: 280 Quota: 827 Turnout: 5,241 (72.63%)

=== Area D ===
1973: 3 x UUP, 2 x SDLP
1977: 2 x UUP, 2 x SDLP, 1 x Independent Nationalist
1973-1977 Change: SDLP gain from UUP, Independent Nationalist leaves SDLP

Armagh Area D - 6 seats
Party	Candidate	FPv%	Count								
Party	Candidate	FPv%	1	2	3	4	5	6	7	8	9
UUP	Frederick Armstrong*	19.17%	1,008								
Ind. Nationalist	Bernard McManus*	15.96%	839	839.78	866.91	866.91	896.91				
SDLP	Oliver Tobin*	13.05%	686	686	711	712.13	784.52	981.52			
UUP	Norman Creswell*	7.51%	395	481.84	485.84	697.65	807.47	808.47	1,124.47		
SDLP	Pat Brannigan	9.76%	513	513.78	528.78	531.78	555.91	658.04	660.3	673.3	765.7
Republican Clubs	Patrick Houlahan	9.64%	507	507	546	547	553	582	583.39	590.39	602.39
DUP	Letitia McClenaghan	7.04%	370	374.42	374.55	385.72	394.24	394.24			
SDLP	James McAvinchey	5.67%	298	298.26	317.26	318.26	339.39				
Alliance	Norah Dawson	5.17%	272	274.73	302.99	309.03					
UUP	Robert Mercer*	3.80%	200	233.41	237.54						
Independent Labour	Paddy Grimes	3.21%	169	169.65							
Electorate: 8,619 Valid: 5,257 (60.99%) Spoilt: 240 Quota: 877 Turnout: 5,497 (63.78%)
