= 1973 Armagh District Council election =

Local govt election in Northern Ireland

30 May 1973	1977 →

All 20 seats to Armagh District Council 11 seats needed for a majority
	First party	Second party	Third party
Party	UUP	SDLP	DUP
Seats won	11	5	2
	Fourth party	Fifth party
Party	Alliance	Independent
Seats won	1	1

Elections to Armagh District Council were held on 30 May 1973 on the same day as the other Northern Irish local government elections. The election used four district electoral areas to elect a total of 20 councillors.

== Election results ==
Party	Seats	±	First Pref. votes	FPv%	±%
UUP	11		10,405	45.4	
SDLP	5		5,200	22.7	
DUP	2		2,601	11.3	
Alliance	1		1,785	7.8	
Independent	1		1,130	4.9	
Republican Clubs	0		1,070	4.7	
NI Labour	0		583	2.5	
Unity	0		153	0.7	
Totals	20		22,927	100.0	—

== Districts summary ==
Results of the Armagh District Council election, 1973 by district
Ward	%	Cllrs	%	Cllrs	%	Cllrs	%	Cllrs	%	Cllrs	Total Cllrs
Ward	UUP		SDLP		DUP		Alliance		Others		Total Cllrs
Area A	34.3	2	14.6	0	24.8	1	5.3	0	21.0	1	4
Area B	53.6	4	14.4	1	20.5	1	9.1	0	2.4	0	6
Area C	44.1	2	34.8	2	0.0	0	7.0	1	14.1	0	5
Area D	44.4	3	28.0	2	0.0	0	8.7	0	18.9	0	5
Total	45.4	11	22.7	5	11.3	2	7.8	1	12.8	1	20

== Districts results ==
=== Area A ===
1973: 2 x UUP, 1 x DUP, 1 x Independent

Armagh Area A - 4 seats
Party	Candidate	FPv%	Count							
Party	Candidate	FPv%	1	2	3	4	5	6	7	8
DUP	Douglas Hutchinson	24.83%	1,076							
UUP	Mary Huey	16.87%	731	847.55	849.97	849.97	930.97			
UUP	Samuel Foster	17.44%	756	837.9	837.9	837.9	876.9			
Independent	D. Magee	11.14%	483	484.05	517.26	528.26	570.73	590.73	680.94	795.94
SDLP	Francis McIlvanna	8.84%	383	383	398	415.21	435.21	437.21	606.21	729.21
Republican Clubs	T. C. McGleenan	3.39%	147	147	198	320	323	323	349	
SDLP	S. R. D. Coyle	5.81%	252	252	263	267	302.21	303.21		
Alliance	R. W. Anderson	5.31%	230	235.46	237.46	238.46				
Republican Clubs	P. McCusker	3.32%	144	144.21	157.21					
Republican Clubs	M. J. Toal	1.75%	76	76						
NI Labour	P. Hunter	0.74%	32	32.84						
Independent	P. Fox	0.55%	24	24						
Electorate: 5,667 Valid: 4,334 (76.48%) Spoilt: 88 Quota: 867 Turnout: 4,422 (78.03%)

=== Area B ===
1973: 4 x UUP, 1 x DUP, 1 x SDLP

Armagh Area B - 6 seats
Party	Candidate	FPv%	Count							
Party	Candidate	FPv%	1	2	3	4	5	6	7	8
DUP	Thomas Black	20.51%	1,525							
UUP	Nathaniel McMahon	16.26%	1,209							
SDLP	Seamus Mallon	14.41%	1,071							
UUP	William Henning	14.10%	1,048	1,168.45						
UUP	Nelson Huddleston	10.17%	756	838.5	890.46	929.76	931.76	961.08	994.87	1,127.87
UUP	Andrew Crothers	6.66%	495	646.14	687.06	729.66	729.99	748.44	763.25	942.29
UUP	Thomas Hutchinson	6.40%	476	543.32	586.64	607.64	609.76	642.93	678.69	781.7
Alliance	Austin Best	4.32%	321	326.61	328.17	328.47	334.8	416.57	638.41	
Alliance	John Lamb	3.23%	240	249.24	252.6	252.9	267.9	329.9		
Alliance	Harden Glendinning	1.56%	116	119.63	120.35	120.35	141.47			
Independent	Robert Newell	1.30%	97	108.55	110.95	112.15	112.15			
NI Labour	Eamon McCann	1.08%	80	80.66	81.02	81.02				
Electorate: 9,667 Valid: 7,434 (76.90%) Spoilt: 115 Quota: 1,063 Turnout: 7,549 (78.09%)

=== Area C ===
1973: 2 x SDLP, 2 x UUP, 1 x Alliance

Armagh Area C - 5 seats
Party	Candidate	FPv%	Count					
Party	Candidate	FPv%	1	2	3	4	5	6
UUP	J. Reid	28.39%	1,544					
SDLP	Patrick Fegan	17.93%	975					
UUP	W. Shilliday	15.66%	852	1,474.79				
SDLP	M. Cunningham	11.33%	616	616.82	618.46	653.88	895.25	1,026.25
Alliance	Eugene Connolly	7.04%	383	385.46	559.3	563.78	584.89	696.09
Independent	E. Conroy	8.99%	489	489.41	494.74	501.25	521.36	571.52
NI Labour	J. Fullerton	5.11%	278	281.69	334.99	340.87	363.77	
SDLP	P. Nugent	5.55%	302	302.41	303.23	318.7		
Electorate: 7,398 Valid: 5,439 (73.52%) Spoilt: 166 Quota: 907 Turnout: 5,605 (75.76%)

=== Area D ===
1973: 3 x UUP, 2 x SDLP

Armagh Area D - 6 seats
Party	Candidate	FPv%	Count													
Party	Candidate	FPv%	1	2	3	4	5	6	7	8	9	10	11	12	13	14
UUP	Frederick Armstrong	27.69%	1,584													
SDLP	Bernard McManus	11.63%	665	665	668	677	678	684	711	749	822	827	837	1,071		
UUP	Robert Mercer	8.27%	473	779.54	779.54	779.54	779.54	779.54	781.54	781.54	781.54	802.85	802.85	805.85	910.12	
SDLP	Oliver Tobin	7.06%	404	404.39	404.39	406.39	406.39	407.39	427.39	436.39	534.39	540.39	544.39	675.39	875.39	984.58
UUP	Norman Creswell	8.41%	481	772.72	772.72	773.5	773.5	773.5	775.89	780.06	780.06	790.93	794.62	797.62	888.91	888.91
Republican Clubs	Patrick Houlahan	4.65%	266	266	275	276	297	368	377	398	403	405	720	747	769	775.71
Alliance	J. Fitzgerald	4.81%	275	282.8	282.8	287.8	287.8	288.8	309.8	313.8	323.8	523.75	530.75	553.75		
SDLP	T. M. McIntegart	5.26%	301	301	305	311	314	321	350	369	417	423	431			
Republican Clubs	A. P. Cassin	4.62%	264	264.39	270.39	271.39	297.39	323.39	327.39	365.39	367.39	369.39				
Alliance	M. K. Lamb	3.85%	220	227.02	227.02	227.41	227.41	229.41	251.41	251.41	258.41					
SDLP	M. M. McReynolds	4.04%	231	231	231	232	233	234	244	246						
Unity	Patrick Agnew	2.67%	153	154.17	164.17	165.17	167.17	171.17	177.17							
NI Labour	Paddy Grimes	2.48%	142	142.39	142.39	164.39	164.39	164.39								
Republican Clubs	J. Trainor	1.80%	103	103	104	105	120									
Republican Clubs	E. P. Reilly	1.22%	70	70	71	71										
NI Labour	G. J. McCreesh	0.89%	51	52.17	52.17											
Independent	G. R. Mackey	0.65%	37	37												
Electorate: 8,434 Valid: 5,720 (67.82%) Spoilt: 122 Quota: 954 Turnout: 5,842 (69.27%)
