= 1981 Armagh District Council election =

Local govt election in Northern Ireland

← 1977	20 May 1981	1985 →

All 20 seats to Armagh District Council 11 seats needed for a majority
	First party	Second party	Third party
Party	UUP	SDLP	DUP
Seats won	8	7	3
Seat change	▼1	0	▲1
	Fourth party	Fifth party
Party	UUUP	Ind. Nationalist
Seats won	1	1
Seat change	0	0

Elections to Armagh District Council were held on 20 May 1981 on the same day as the other Northern Irish local government elections. The election used four district electoral areas to elect a total of 20 councillors.

== Election results ==
Armagh District Council Election Result 1981
Party	Seats	Gains	Losses	Net gain/loss	Seats %	Votes %	Votes	+/−
UUP	8	0	1	▼1	40.0	38.7	9,267	▼0.1
SDLP	7	0	0	0	35.0	30.8	7,363	▲0.5
DUP	3	1	0	▲1	15.0	18.5	4,417	▲5.7
Ind. Nationalist	1	0	0	0	5.0	4.2	1,011	▲0.2
UUUP	1	0	0	0	5.0	3.6	865	▼0.9
Irish Independence	0	0	0	0	0.0	2.1	493	New
Independent	0	0	0	0	0.0	1.5	370	▲0.7
Independent Labour	0	0	0	0	0.0	0.6	134	▲0.6

Note: "Votes" are the first preference votes.

== Districts summary ==
Results of the Armagh District Council election, 1981 by district
Ward	%	Cllrs	%	Cllrs	%	Cllrs	%	Cllrs	%	Cllrs	Total Cllrs
Ward	UUP		SDLP		DUP		UUUP		Others		Total Cllrs
Area A	37.6	2	33.3	1	27.2	1	1.8	0	0.0	0	4
Area B	52.2	3	16.2	1	22.5	1	9.2	1	0.0	0	6
Area C	25.3	1	46.6	3	12.6	0	0.0	0	15.5	0	5
Area D	32.3	2	35.6	2	11.7	0	0.0	0	20.4	1	5
Total	38.7	8	30.8	7	18.5	3	3.6	1	8.4	1	20

== Districts results ==
=== Area A ===
1977: 2 x UUP, 1 x SDLP, 1 x DUP
1981: 2 x UUP, 1 x SDLP, 1 x DUP
1977-1981 Change: No change

Armagh Area A - 4 seats
Party	Candidate	FPv%	Count		
Party	Candidate	FPv%	1	2	3
UUP	Ronald Allen	22.78%	938		
DUP	Douglas Hutchinson*	21.32%	878		
UUP	Samuel Foster*	14.81%	610	844	
SDLP	Francis McIlvanna*	18.97%	781	784	804
SDLP	Francis Kernan	14.40%	593	599	676
DUP	Norman Kerr	5.93%	244		
UUUP	Robert Cummings	1.80%	74		
Electorate: 5,833 Valid: 4,118 (70.60%) Spoilt: 178 Quota: 824 Turnout: 4,296 (73.65%)

=== Area B ===
1977: 3 x UUP, 1 x DUP, 1 x SDLP, 1 x UUUP
1981: 3 x UUP, 1 x DUP, 1 x SDLP, 1 x UUUP
1977-1981 Change: No change

Armagh Area B - 6 seats
Party	Candidate	FPv%	Count						
Party	Candidate	FPv%	1	2	3	4	5	6	7
UUP	Jim Speers*	22.40%	1,931						
SDLP	Seamus Mallon*	16.17%	1,394						
UUP	William McClelland*	12.67%	1,092	1,264.8					
DUP	Thomas Black*	10.64%	917	955.16	959.88	963.38	1,170.16	1,843.16	
UUUP	Francis Little*	8.49%	732	768.72	808.08	819.98	867.52	895.84	1,189.84
UUP	Robert Turner	8.61%	742	967	968.72	1,033.12	1,054.48	1,087.38	1,178.38
UUP	Thomas Johnston	8.50%	733	891.4	902.2	970.8	994.04	1,026.44	1,143.44
DUP	John Alexander	6.51%	561	573.96	576.4	582	787.96		
DUP	Mervyn Spratt	5.32%	459	498.96	503.96	511.66			
UUUP	Frederick Hamilton	0.68%	59	65.48					
Electorate: 10,993 Valid: 8,620 (78.41%) Spoilt: 160 Quota: 1,232 Turnout: 8,780 (79.87%)

=== Area C ===
1977: 3 x SDLP, 2 x UUP
1981: 3 x SDLP, 1 x UUP, 1 x DUP
1977-1981 Change: DUP gain from UUP

Armagh Area C - 5 seats
Party	Candidate	FPv%	Count			
Party	Candidate	FPv%	1	2	3	4
SDLP	Patrick Fegan*	17.55%	980			
UUP	Jim Nicholson*	17.23%	962			
SDLP	James McKernan*	16.71%	933			
DUP	Joseph McBride	12.63%	705	705.35	709.4	1,041.4
SDLP	Joseph Dunleavy	12.36%	690	729.35	853.9	867.9
Irish Independence	Patrick Agnew	8.83%	493	495.6	629.9	633.95
UUP	Eleanor Boyd*	8.06%	450	450.35	462.35	
Independent	Peter McSorley	6.63%	370	373.9		
Electorate: 7,281 Valid: 5,583 (76.68%) Spoilt: 207 Quota: 931 Turnout: 5,790 (79.52%)

=== Area D ===
1977: 2 x SDLP, 2 x UUP, 1 x Independent Nationalist
1981: 2 x SDLP, 2 x UUP, 1 x Independent Nationalist
1977-1981 Change: No change

Armagh Area D - 6 seats
Party	Candidate	FPv%	Count							
Party	Candidate	FPv%	1	2	3	4	5	6	7	8
UUP	Frederick Armstrong*	20.95%	1,173							
Ind. Nationalist	Bernard McManus*	18.06%	1,011							
SDLP	Pat Brannigan*	14.41%	807	808.4	832.8	854.22	857.22	1,224.22		
SDLP	John Agnew	11.02%	617	617.4	646.6	672.59	675.59	887.39	1,174.49	
UUP	George Macartney	7.02%	393	457.8	469	469.18	820.58	822.87	823.74	855.93
DUP	Letitia McClenaghan	11.66%	653	667.6	671.6	671.78	713.78	716.07	716.07	719.55
SDLP	Gerald Grimley	10.14%	568	568.2	593.4	619.41	620.61			
UUP	Norman Creswell*	4.34%	243	394.4	405.4	405.58				
Independent Labour	Carson Greer	2.39%	134	134.8						
Electorate: 8,699 Valid: 5,599 (64.36%) Spoilt: 228 Quota: 934 Turnout: 5,827 (66.98%)
