= Michael Armstrong (politician) =

Politician, lawyer and soldier from Northern Ireland

Member of the Northern Ireland Constitutional Convention for Armagh
- In office 1975–1976
- Preceded by: Convention created
- Succeeded by: Convention abolished

Personal details
- Born: 1924; France
- Died: 1982
- Political party: Ulster Unionist

Michael Armstrong (1924–1982) was a Northern Irish politician, barrister and soldier.

== Background ==
Born in France, Armstrong studied law at Cambridge University and practised as a barrister before embarking on a military career. At the outbreak of the Second World War he enlisted as an officer in the Irish Guards and retired as a captain in 1945, having served with the Allied occupation government of Germany. He subsequently served with the Ulster Special Constabulary and was a district commander in this group when it was disbanded in 1970. He was then a commander in the County Armagh company of the Ulster Defence Regiment until 1974.

Armstrong was a member of the Ulster Unionist Party and in 1975 was elected as a delegate to the Northern Ireland Constitutional Convention for Armagh. He also served as honorary secretary of the Ulster Unionist Council as UUP spokesman on defence and security issues.

He was killed in a car crash in 1982.

Northern Ireland Constitutional Convention
New convention	Member for Armagh; 1975–1976	Convention dissolved
