= Alistair Black =

Northern Irish unionist politician

Member of Craigavon Borough Council
- In office 15 May 1985 – 17 May 1989
- Preceded by: District created
- Succeeded by: Meta Crozier
- Constituency: Lurgan
- In office 30 May 1973 – 15 May 1985
- Preceded by: Council established
- Succeeded by: District abolished
- Constituency: Craigavon Area D

Member of the Northern Ireland Constitutional Convention for Armagh
- In office 1975–1976

Member of the Northern Ireland Assembly for Armagh
- In office 1973–1975

Personal details
- Party: Ulster Unionist Party (from 1984); United Ulster Unionist (1975 - 1984)
- Other political affiliations: Vanguard (1972 - 1975)

Alistair Black was a Northern Irish unionist politician.

== Background ==
The headmaster of Carrick Primary School, Black came to prominence as the leading figure in Ulster Vanguard in County Armagh. Due to his outspoken loyalist views, the Irish Republican Army attempted to kill him in 1972 and again in 1975, when a bomb left in his desk drawer instead killed a police officer who was investigating.

Black was elected to Craigavon Borough Council for the Vanguard Unionist Progressive Party at the 1973 Northern Ireland local elections, and then to the Northern Ireland Constitutional Convention in Armagh in 1975. He joined the United Ulster Unionist Party (UUUP) split from Vanguard and held his council seat in 1977 and 1981, but lost his Armagh seat at the 1982 Assembly election. When the UUUP dissolved, he instead joined the Ulster Unionist Party and again held his council seat in 1985.

Northern Ireland Constitutional Convention
| New convention | Member for Armagh; 1975–1976 | Convention dissolved |
