= 1985 Armagh District Council election =

Local govt election in Northern Ireland

| ← 1981 | 15 May 1985 | 1989 → |

All 22 seats to Armagh District Council 12 seats needed for a majority
| | First party | Second party | Third party |
|---|---|---|---|
| Party | UUP | SDLP | DUP |
| Seats won | 11 | 7 | 3 |
| Seat change | ▲3 | 0 | 0 |
| | Fourth party | Fifth party | Sixth party |
| Party | Sinn Féin | UUUP | Ind. Nationalist |
| Seats won | 1 | 0 | 0 |
| Seat change | ▲1 | ▼1 | ▼1 |

Elections to Armagh District Council were held on 15 May 1985 on the same day as the other Northern Irish local government elections. The election used four district electoral areas to elect a total of 22 councillors.

== Election results ==
Armagh District Council Election Result 1985
| Party | Seats | Gains | Losses | Net gain/loss | Seats % | Votes % | Votes | +/− |
|---|---|---|---|---|---|---|---|---|
| UUP | 11 | 0 | 3 | ▲3 | 50.0 | 43.8 | 10,287 | ▲5.1 |
| SDLP | 7 | 0 | 0 | 0 | 31.8 | 30.1 | 7,076 | ▼0.7 |
| DUP | 3 | 0 | 0 | 0 | 13.6 | 17.0 | 3,985 | ▼1.5 |
| Sinn Féin | 1 | 1 | 0 | ▲1 | 4.5 | 6.4 | 1,515 | New |
| Ind. Nationalist | 0 | 0 | 1 | ▼1 | 0.0 | 2.7 | 640 | ▼1.5 |

Note: "Votes" are the first preference votes.

== Districts summary ==
Results of the Armagh District Council election, 1985 by district
| Ward | % | Cllrs | % | Cllrs | % | Cllrs | % | Cllrs | % | Cllrs | Total Cllrs |
| Ward | UUP | | SDLP | | DUP | | Sinn Féin | | Others | | Total Cllrs |
|---|---|---|---|---|---|---|---|---|---|---|---|
| Armagh City | 30.4 | 2 | 30.3 | 2 | 12.6 | 1 | 16.1 | 1 | 10.6 | 0 | 6 |
| Crossmore | 30.6 | 2 | 58.5 | 3 | 10.9 | 0 | 0.0 | 0 | 0.0 | 0 | 5 |
| Cusher | 60.2 | 4 | 17.8 | 1 | 22.0 | 1 | 0.0 | 0 | 0.0 | 0 | 6 |
| The Orchard | 48.7 | 3 | 21.2 | 1 | 20.4 | 1 | 9.7 | 0 | 0.0 | 0 | 5 |
| Total | 43.8 | 11 | 30.1 | 7 | 17.0 | 2 | 6.4 | 1 | 2.7 | 0 | 22 |

== District results ==
=== Armagh City ===
1985: 2 x SDLP, 2 x UUP, 1 x Sinn Féin, 1 x DUP

Armagh City - 6 seats
| Party | Candidate | FPv% | Count | | | | | |
| Party | Candidate | FPv% | 1 | 2 | 3 | 4 | 5 | 6 |
|---|---|---|---|---|---|---|---|---|
| Sinn Féin | Thomas Carroll | 16.11% | 970 | | | | | |
| SDLP | John Agnew* | 12.27% | 739 | 762.94 | 920.94 | | | |
| SDLP | Pat Brannigan* | 10.16% | 612 | 622.92 | 861.42 | | | |
| UUP | John Doogan | 10.71% | 645 | 645.14 | 646.14 | 646.14 | 901.14 | |
| UUP | George Macartney* | 10.30% | 620 | 620.14 | 625.14 | 625.9 | 871.9 | |
| DUP | Geoffrey Knipe | 12.55% | 756 | 756.14 | 757.14 | 757.14 | 816.14 | 854.33 |
| Ind. Nationalist | Bernard McManus* | 10.63% | 640 | 699.78 | 773.84 | 832.36 | 835.36 | 835.93 |
| UUP | Robert Orr | 9.37% | 564 | 564 | 565 | 565 | | |
| SDLP | Oliver Tobin | 7.90% | 476 | 487.62 | | | | |
Electorate: 9,766 Valid: 6,022 (61.66%) Spoilt: 100 Quota: 861 Turnout: 6,122 (62.69%)

=== Crossmore ===
1985: 3 x SDLP, 2 x UUP

Crossmore - 5 seats
| Party | Candidate | FPv% | Count | | | |
| Party | Candidate | FPv% | 1 | 2 | 3 | 4 |
|---|---|---|---|---|---|---|
| SDLP | Charles Mallon | 22.41% | 1,072 | | | |
| UUP | Jim Nicholson* | 19.84% | 949 | | | |
| SDLP | James McKernan* | 18.58% | 889 | | | |
| SDLP | Thomas McArdle | 17.50% | 837 | | | |
| UUP | Thomas Shilliday | 10.72% | 513 | 541 | 667.88 | 690.88 |
| DUP | Joseph McBride* | 10.95% | 524 | 580 | 603.36 | 611.36 |
Electorate: 7,459 Valid: 4,784 (64.14%) Spoilt: 137 Quota: 798 Turnout: 4,921 (65.97%)

=== Cusher ===
1985: 4 x UUP, 1 x SDLP, 1 x DUP

Cusher - 6 seats
| Party | Candidate | FPv% | Count | | |
| Party | Candidate | FPv% | 1 | 2 | 3 |
|---|---|---|---|---|---|
| UUP | Eric Speers | 17.92% | 1,267 | | |
| SDLP | Seamus Mallon* | 17.82% | 1,260 | | |
| UUP | Thomas Johnston | 16.25% | 1,149 | | |
| DUP | Thomas Black* | 14.27% | 1,009 | | |
| UUP | Robert Turner* | 12.74% | 901 | 1,042.4 | |
| UUP | James Clayton | 13.28% | 939 | 993.4 | 1,059.4 |
| DUP | Mervyn Spratt | 7.72% | 546 | 570 | 615 |
Electorate: 9,467 Valid: 7,071 (74.69%) Spoilt: 63 Quota: 1,011 Turnout: 7,134 (75.36%)

=== The Orchard ===
1985: 3 x UUP, 1 x SDLP, 1 x DUP

The Orchard - 5 seats
| Party | Candidate | FPv% | Count | | | | | |
| Party | Candidate | FPv% | 1 | 2 | 3 | 4 | 5 | 6 |
|---|---|---|---|---|---|---|---|---|
| UUP | Jim Speers* | 21.13% | 1,189 | | | | | |
| DUP | Douglas Hutchinson* | 20.44% | 1,150 | | | | | |
| UUP | Ronald Allen* | 15.55% | 875 | 972.23 | | | | |
| UUP | Samuel Foster* | 12.02% | 676 | 823.21 | 1,027.81 | | | |
| SDLP | Christopher McAnallen | 10.88% | 612 | 612.63 | 612.83 | 626.43 | 783.63 | 794.34 |
| SDLP | Francis McIlvanna* | 10.29% | 579 | 579.84 | 580.04 | 584.64 | 771.04 | 773.14 |
| Sinn Féin | Brigid McCartan | 9.69% | 545 | 545 | 546.4 | 546.6 | | |
Electorate: 7,682 Valid: 5,626 (73.24%) Spoilt: 92 Quota: 938 Turnout: 5,718 (74.43%)
