= Armagh (Assembly constituency) =

Coordinates: 54.348°N 6.656°W

Armagh was a constituency used for the Northern Ireland Assembly.

The seat was first used for a Northern Ireland-only election for the Northern Ireland Assembly, 1973. Members were then elected from the constituency to the 1975 Constitutional Convention and the 1982 Assembly. After the Assembly dissolved in 1986, the constituency was not used again, its area being represented by parts of Newry and Armagh and Upper Bann.

It usually shared boundaries with the Armagh UK Parliament constituency, however the boundaries of the two constituencies were slightly different from 1983 to 1986 as the Assembly boundaries had not caught up with Parliamentary boundary changes.

For further details of the history and boundaries of the constituency, see Armagh (UK Parliament constituency).

== Members ==
Election	MLA (Party)	MLA (Party)	MLA (Party)	MLA (Party)	MLA (Party)	MLA (Party)	MLA (Party)
1973	Hugh News (SDLP)	Seamus Mallon (SDLP)	Paddy O'Hanlon (SDLP)	Herbert Whitten (UUP)	James Stronge (UUP)	Thomas Carson (Vanguard)	Douglas Hutchinson (DUP)
1975	Hugh News (SDLP)	Seamus Mallon (SDLP)	Michael Armstrong (UUP)	Herbert Whitten (UUP)	Alistair Black (Vanguard)	Thomas Carson (Vanguard)	Douglas Hutchinson (DUP)
1982	Hugh News (SDLP)	Seamus Mallon (SDLP)	Jim McAllister (Sinn Féin)	Mary Simpson (UUP)	Jim Nicholson (UUP)	Harold McCusker (UUP)	David Calvert (DUP)
1983 by-election	Hugh News (SDLP)	Jim Speers (UUP)	Jim McAllister (Sinn Féin)	Mary Simpson (UUP)	Jim Nicholson (UUP)	Harold McCusker (UUP)	David Calvert (DUP)

Note: The columns in this table are used only for presentational purposes, and no significance should be attached to the order of columns. For details of the order in which seats were won at each election, see the detailed results of that election.

== Elections ==
=== 1983 by-election ===
1983 by-election: Armagh – 1 seat
Party	Candidate	FPv%	Count
Party	Candidate	FPv%	1
UUP	Jim Speers	84.5	26,907
Workers' Party	Tom French	15.5	4,920
Electorate: 95,100 Valid: 31,827 Spoilt: 571 Quota: 15,914 Turnout: 31,827 (34.07%)

=== 1982 Assembly Election ===
1982 Assembly election: Armagh – 7 seats
Party	Candidate	FPv%	Count													
Party	Candidate	FPv%	1	2	3	4	5	6	7	8	9	10	11	12	13	14
UUP	Harold McCusker	31.58%	19,547													
SDLP	Seamus Mallon	13.78%	8,528													
UUP	Jim Nicholson	4.18%	2,590	7,155.4	7,156.39	7,384.79	7,472.99	7,472.99	8,137.39							
Sinn Féin	Jim McAllister	8.37%	5,182	5,188.6	5,230.81	5,247.06	5,248.06	7,717.11	7,720.11	7,721.11	8,090.61					
UUP	Mary Simpson	1.16%	721	3,838	3,838.18	4,147.38	4,360.18	4,361.47	4,857.07	5,126.57	5,220.57	5,221.45	8,212.94			
DUP	David Calvert	4.30%	2,661	3,110.4	3,110.4	3,124.8	3,873.6	3,873.6	4,845.6	4,868.6	4,887.8	4,887.8	5,135.9	5,310.32	9,459.68	
SDLP	Hugh News	4.64%	2,871	2,883	3,256.77	3,578.05	3,580.05	3,778.44	3,781.44	3,781.44	5,460.43	5,566.91	5,570.11	5,571.01	5,576.58	5,607.18
SDLP	Paddy O'Hanlon	6.84%	4,231	4,239.4	4,501.75	4,688.94	4,691.63	4,799.17	4,800.17	4,801.17	5,199.69	5,245.45	5,252.51	5,254.67	5,255.27	5,288.87
DUP	Douglas Hutchinson	3.77%	2,333	2,894	2,894.27	2,915.36	3,630.56	3,631.63	4,238.45	4,259.95	4,276.15	4,277.91	4,741.51	5,016.91		
UUP	Jim Speers	2.97%	1,836	3,438	3,438.45	3,538.72	3,623.32	3,625.1	3,858.5	3,953	3,981.6	3,982.48				
Workers' Party	Tom French	4.57%	2,826	2,850.6	2,872.02	3,270.19	3,272.88	3,470.41	3,494.21	3,494.71						
UUUP	Alistair Black	3.25%	2,014	2,873.8	2,873.98	2,941.78	3,096.38	3,096.98								
Sinn Féin	Jim O'Hagan	4.91%	3,042	3,049.2	3,072.42	3,088.87	3,088.87									
DUP	Woolsey Smith	2.77%	1,716	2,028	2,028.18	2,039.38										
Alliance	William Jeffrey	2.92%	1,806	1,942.2	1,958.04											
Electorate: 95,610 Valid: 61,904 (64.75%) Spoilt: 2,078 Quota: 7,739 Turnout: 63,982 (66.92%)

=== 1975 Constitutional Convention ===
1975 Constitutional Convention: Armagh – 7 seats
Party	Candidate	FPv%	Count								
Party	Candidate	FPv%	1	2	3	4	5	6	7	8	9
SDLP	Seamus Mallon	15.15%	8,999								
UUP	Michael Armstrong	14.82%	8,802								
DUP	Douglas Hutchinson	13.04%	7,746								
UUP	Herbert Whitten	8.15%	4,843	4,843.68	5,198.13	5,240.93	5,242.93	5,276.1	5,381.45	5,383.64	7,021.28
Vanguard	Thomas Carson	10.06%	5,974	5,974.17	6,225.57	6,367.29	6,371.29	6,388.17	6,439.62	6,448.83	6,885.85
Vanguard	Alistair Black	9.15%	5,435	5,435	6,064.7	6,180.18	6,188.22	6,213.99	6,283.98	6,287.17	6,789.62
SDLP	Hugh News	5.56%	3,303	4,261.12	4,261.87	4,261.91	4,327.43	4,375	5,074.49	6,140.54	6,457.05
SDLP	Paddy O'Hanlon	7.93%	4,710	5,095.22	5,095.22	5,095.26	5,190.25	5,206.16	5,678.08	6,243.37	6,361.22
Unionist Party NI	John Maginnis	4.71%	2,797	2,798.53	2,860.48	2,867.16	2,870.46	3,002.02	3,838.8	3,856.14	
Republican Clubs	Malachy McGurran	4.34%	2,577	2,650.1	2,650.55	2,650.71	3,587.51	3,602.36	3,761.35		
Alliance	Eugene Connolly	2.93%	1,742	1,781.44	1,787.74	1,788.14	1,806.09	2,828.98			
Alliance	Brian English	2.20%	1,307	1,318.05	1,327.65	1,328.41	1,332.28				
Republican Clubs	Patrick Houlahan	1.04%	617	636.38	636.98	637.18					
Republican Clubs	Thomas Moore	0.90%	536	546.2	546.2	546.2					
Electorate: 90,640 Valid: 59,388 (65.52%) Spoilt: 2,011 Quota: 7,424 Turnout: 61,399 (67.74%)

=== 1973 Assembly Election ===
1973 Assembly election: Armagh – 7 seats
Party	Candidate	FPv%	Count											
Party	Candidate	FPv%	1	2	3	4	5	6	7	8	9	10	11	12
SDLP	Paddy O'Hanlon	13.39%	8,219											
SDLP	Seamus Mallon	13.02%	7,995											
UUP	Herbert Whitten	11.22%	6,891	6,891.24	7,127.3	7,127.58	7,208.62	7,284.62	8,140.62					
Vanguard	Thomas Carson	11.18%	6,866	6,866.66	6,936.66	6,936.74	6,955.86	7,432.86	7,505.86	7,810.86				
UUP	James Stronge	7.06%	4,335	4,336.44	4,458.56	4,458.72	4,524.72	4,537.78	5,235.84	5,383.84	5,526.94	8,693.94		
SDLP	Hugh News	7.71%	4,731	5,163.3	5,278.48	5,564.96	5,670.04	5,672.08	5,677.18	5,677.18	5,677.73	5,688.79	5,691.03	7,832.03
DUP	Douglas Hutchinson	7.41%	4,552	4,552.12	4,598.18	4,598.5	4,612.5	4,821.5	4,902.56	6,620.56	6,644.76	6,887.4	7,237.4	7,431.4
Vanguard	Frederick Crowe	4.01%	2,465	2,465.12	2,492.12	2,492.24	2,503.28	3,639.34	3,689.34	4,168.34	4,190.89	4,447.37	4,904.33	5,093.33
Alliance	Eugene Connolly	4.19%	2,572	2,589.7	2,763.38	2,780.06	4,268.62	4,275.72	4,292.72	4,302.72	4,304.37	4,329.3	4,630.34	
UUP	Alexander Greer	4.28%	2,630	2,630.36	2,689.42	2,689.56	2,762.6	2,771.66	3,603.8	3,697.8	3,869.95			
DUP	Thomas Willey	4.26%	2,616	2,616	2,639.06	2,639.14	2,642.14	2,726.14	2,773.14					
UUP	Robert James Mitchell	4.19%	2,571	2,571.42	2,625.48	2,625.84	2,653.84	2,673.64						
Vanguard	Samuel McCammick	3.29%	2,018	2,018.3	2,034.36	2,034.48	2,040.52							
Alliance	Howard McNally	2.67%	1,637	1,642.58	1,940.6	1,945.54								
NI Labour	Thomas Newell	1.70%	1,044	1,053.9										
Independent	Robert Murphy	0.39%	238	244										
Electorate: 89,056 Valid: 61,400 (68.95%) Spoilt: 1,955 Quota: 7,676 Turnout: 63,355 (71.14%)
