= Douglas Hutchinson =

Member of Armagh District Council
- In office 15 May 1985 – 19 May 1993
- Preceded by: District created
- Succeeded by: Brian Hutchinson
- Constituency: The Orchard
- In office 30 May 1973 – 15 May 1985
- Preceded by: Council created
- Succeeded by: District abolished
- Constituency: Armagh Area A

Member of the Northern Ireland Constitutional Convention for Armagh
- In office 1975–1976

Member of the Northern Ireland Assembly for Armagh
- In office 1973–1974

Member of Armagh Rural District Council
- In office 1953–1973

Personal details
- Born: 1918 Richhill, County Armagh, Northern Ireland
- Died: December 1995 (aged 76–77)
- Party: DUP (1971 - 1995); Ulster Unionist (until 1969)
- Other political affiliations: Ulster Protestant Action (before 1966)

Douglas Hutchinson (1918 – December 1995) was a Northern Irish Unionist politician.

== Background ==
Born in Richhill, County Armagh, Hutchinson worked as a fruit farmer. In 1953, he succeeded his father as an Ulster Unionist Party (UUP) member of Armagh Rural District Council, holding his seat until its abolition in 1973. He was also active in Ian Paisley's Ulster Protestant Action, and was prominent in the paramilitary Ulster Protestant Volunteers. He served in the Ulster Special Constabulary, but left after being sentenced to one month's imprisonment for disrupting a civil rights march in Armagh in November 1968.

Hutchinson resigned from the UUP in October 1969, stating that he disagreed with their policy of compromise. Around this time, he was expelled from the Orange Order and from the Royal Black Preceptory for protesting against what he saw as support for appeasement among some of their leadership. In 1971, he was sentenced to six months in prison for taking part in a banned parade in Dungiven although, on appeal, this was commuted to a £60 fine.

Hutchinson stood for the Democratic Unionist Party in Armagh at the 1973 Northern Ireland Assembly election, becoming the last candidate elected. He was elected to Armagh District Council at the 1973 local election. He was elected to the 1975 Northern Ireland Constitutional Convention with an increased vote, but failed to take a seat in the 1982 Assembly election. He held his council seat until his retirement in 1993, when he was succeeded by his son, Brian.

Northern Ireland Assembly (1973)
New assembly	Assembly Member for Armagh; 1973–1974	Assembly abolished
Northern Ireland Constitutional Convention
New convention	Member for Armagh; 1975–1976	Convention dissolved
