= 2005 Banbridge District Council election =

Local govt election in Northern Ireland

← 2001	5 May 2005	2011 →

All 17 seats to Banbridge District Council 9 seats needed for a majority
	First party	Second party	Third party
Party	DUP	UUP	SDLP
Seats won	7	5	3
Seat change	▲2	▼2	Steady
	Fourth party	Fifth party	Sixth party
Party	Sinn Féin	Alliance	Independent
Seats won	1	1	0
Seat change	▲1	Steady	▼1
- Party with the most votes by district.

Elections to Banbridge District Council were held on 5 May 2005 on the same day as the other Northern Irish local government elections. The election used three district electoral areas to elect a total of 17 councillors.

== Election results ==
Banbridge District Council Election Result 2005
Party	Seats	Gains	Losses	Net gain/loss	Seats %	Votes %	Votes	+/−
DUP	7	2	0	▲2	41.2	38.3	7,251	▲10.6
UUP	5	0	2	▼2	29.4	32.4	6,122	▼5.0
SDLP	3	0	0	Steady	17.6	15.9	2,999	▼3.3
Sinn Féin	1	1	0	▲1	5.9	6.3	1,187	▲2.6
Alliance	1	0	0	Steady	5.9	4.5	856	▲2.5
Independent	0	0	1	▼1	0.0	2.6	498	▼3.3

Note: "Votes" are the first preference votes.

== Districts summary ==
Results of the Banbridge District Council election, 2005 by district
Ward	%	Cllrs	%	Cllrs	%	Cllrs	%	Cllrs	%	Cllrs	%	Cllrs	Total Cllrs
Ward	DUP		UUP		SDLP		Sinn Féin		Alliance		Others		Total Cllrs
Banbridge Town	32.8	2	38.3	2	19.9	1	0.0	0	9.0	1	0.0	0	6
Dromore	49.8	3	31.3	1	11.8	1	7.1	0	0.0	0	0.0	0	5
Knockiveagh	33.2	2	27.8	2	15.7	1	11.3	1	4.5	0	7.5	0	6
Total	38.3	7	32.4	5	15.9	3	6.3	1	4.5	1	2.6	0	17

== Districts results ==
=== Banbridge Town ===
2001: 3 x UUP, 1 x DUP, 1 x SDLP, 1 x Alliance
2005: 2 x UUP, 2 x DUP, 1 x SDLP, 1 x Alliance
2001-2005 Change: DUP gain from UUP

Banbridge Town - 6 seats
Party	Candidate	FPv%	Count					
Party	Candidate	FPv%	1	2	3	4	5	6
UUP	Joan Baird*	24.17%	1,501					
SDLP	Patrick McAleenan*	19.91%	1,236					
DUP	Jim McElroy*	17.54%	1,089					
DUP	Junior McCrum	15.25%	947					
Alliance	Frank McQuaid*	8.95%	556	593.8	920.54			
UUP	Ian Burns*	8.84%	549	724.14	729.72	839.44	862.93	876.13
UUP	Derick Bell*	5.33%	331	727.06	740.7	824.68	857.08	873.8
Electorate: 10,610 Valid: 6,209 (58.52%) Spoilt: 102 Quota: 888 Turnout: 6,311 (59.48%)

=== Dromore ===
2001: 2 x DUP, 2 x UUP, 1 x SDLP
2005: 3 x DUP, 1 x UUP, 1 x SDLP
2001-2005 Change: DUP gain from UUP

Dromore - 5 seats
Party	Candidate	FPv%	Count			
Party	Candidate	FPv%	1	2	3	4
UUP	Tyrone Howe	21.64%	1,304			
DUP	Norah Beare*	21.44%	1,292			
SDLP	Cassie McDermott*	11.82%	712	725.11	1,054.11	
DUP	David Herron*	13.91%	838	858.24	862.24	1,055.84
DUP	Paul Rankin*	14.44%	870	897.14	897.6	976.8
UUP	William Martin*	9.63%	580	814.6	834.83	843.85
Sinn Féin	Francis Branniff	7.12%	429	429.92		
Electorate: 9,542 Valid: 6,025 (63.14%) Spoilt: 94 Quota: 1,005 Turnout: 6,119 (64.13%)

=== Knockiveagh ===
2001: 2 x UUP, 2 x DUP, 1 x SDLP, 1 x Independent
2005: 2 x UUP, 2 x DUP, 1 x SDLP, 1 x Sinn Féin
2001-2005 Change: Sinn Féin gain from Independent

Knockiveagh - 6 seats
Party	Candidate	FPv%	Count							
Party	Candidate	FPv%	1	2	3	4	5	6	7	8
SDLP	Seamus Doyle*	15.74%	1,051							
DUP	Stephen Herron*	15.36%	1,026							
UUP	John Ingram*	13.15%	878	882.68	927.58	932.74	1,176.74			
UUP	John Hanna*	8.88%	593	594.71	674.15	675.95	784.37	964.85		
DUP	Wilfred McFadden*	11.08%	740	740.54	755.54	792.98	826.64	852.56	1,272.56	
Sinn Féin	Dessie Ward	11.35%	758	787.25	798.31	798.31	801.67	802.63	804.65	804.65
Independent	Malachy McCartan*	7.46%	498	534.99	610.73	610.85	620.54	625.34	636.96	723.96
DUP	Ian Wilson	6.72%	449	449.27	460.27	475.63	493.26	501.9		
UUP	John McCallister	5.78%	386	387.53	423.71	425.15				
Alliance	David Griffin	4.49%	300	315.57						
Electorate: 10,151 Valid: 6,679 (65.80%) Spoilt: 117 Quota: 955 Turnout: 6,796 (66.95%)
