= 2001 Banbridge District Council election =

Local govt election in Northern Ireland

← 1997	7 June 2001	2005 →

All 17 seats to Banbridge District Council 9 seats needed for a majority
	First party	Second party	Third party
Party	UUP	DUP	SDLP
Seats won	7	5	3
Seat change	▼2	▲2	0
	Fourth party	Fifth party	Sixth party
Party	Alliance	Independent	Ind. Nationalist
Seats won	1	1	0
Seat change	▲1	▲1	▼2
- Party with the most votes by district.

Elections to Banbridge District Council were held on 7 June 2001 on the same day as the other Northern Irish local government elections. The election used three district electoral areas to elect a total of 17 councillors.

== Election results ==
Banbridge District Council Election Result 2001
Party	Seats	Gains	Losses	Net gain/loss	Seats %	Votes %	Votes	+/−
UUP	7	0	2	▼2	41.2	37.4	7,702	▼15.0
DUP	5	2	0	▲2	29.4	27.7	5,697	▲12.4
SDLP	3	0	0	0	17.6	19.2	3,957	▲1.3
Independent	1	1	0	▲1	5.9	5.9	1,216	▼3.3
Alliance	1	1	0	▲1	5.9	2.0	420	▼3.1
UK Unionist	0	0	0	0	0.0	3.8	776	New
Sinn Féin	0	0	0	0	0.0	3.7	755	▲3.7
NI Unionist	0	0	0	0	0.0	0.3	45	New

Note: "Votes" are the first preference votes.

== Districts summary ==
Results of the Banbridge District Council election, 2001 by district
Ward	%	Cllrs	%	Cllrs	%	Cllrs	%	Cllrs	%	Cllrs	Total Cllrs
Ward	UUP		DUP		SDLP		Alliance		Others		Total Cllrs
Banbridge Town	41.4	3	20.8	1	19.9	0	6.0	1	11.9	0	6
Dromore	40.4	2	39.3	2	19.6	1	0.0	0	0.7	0	5
Knockiveagh	31.2	2	24.6	2	18.3	1	0.0	0	25.9	1	6
Total	37.4	7	27.7	5	19.2	3	2.0	1	13.7	1	17

== Districts results ==
=== Banbridge Town ===
1997: 3 x UUP, 1 x DUP, 1 x SDLP, 1 x Independent Nationalist
2001: 3 x UUP, 1 x DUP, 1 x SDLP, 1 x Alliance
1997-2001 Change: Alliance gain from Independent Nationalist

Banbridge Town - 6 seats
Party	Candidate	FPv%	Count					
Party	Candidate	FPv%	1	2	3	4	5	6
UUP	Joan Baird*	28.06%	1,979					
SDLP	Patrick McAleenan	19.90%	1,404					
UUP	Derick Bell*	6.49%	458	1,063.5				
Alliance	Frank McQuaid	5.95%	420	461.5	702.68	724.68	1,054.68	
DUP	Jim McElroy	10.97%	774	808.5	810.67	938.17	952.41	953.49
UUP	Ian Burns	6.88%	485	674	679.58	800.58	882	926
DUP	Kyle Ferguson	9.88%	697	723	723.31	813.62	819.05	819.93
Independent	Frank Downey	6.35%	448	467.5	608.55	633.05		
UK Unionist	David Hudson	5.51%	389	431.5	431.81			
Electorate: 10,939 Valid: 7,054 (64.48%) Spoilt: 118 Quota: 1,008 Turnout: 7,172 (65.56%)

=== Dromore ===
1997: 3 x UUP, 1 x DUP, 1 x SDLP
2001: 2 x UUP, 2 x DUP, 1 x SDLP
1997-2001 Change: DUP gain from UUP

Dromore - 5 seats
Party	Candidate	FPv%	Count		
Party	Candidate	FPv%	1	2	3
DUP	Paul Rankin	22.43%	1,375		
SDLP	Cassie McDermott*	19.61%	1,202		
DUP	David Herron*	16.84%	1,032		
UUP	William Martin*	14.59%	894	905	1,033.7
UUP	Norah Beare	14.62%	896	910	1,020.22
UUP	Thompson Howe	11.18%	685	696	806.22
NI Unionist	Joseph McIlwaine	0.73%	45		
Electorate: 9,149 Valid: 6,129 (66.99%) Spoilt: 103 Quota: 1,022 Turnout: 6,232 (68.12%)

=== Knockiveagh ===
1997: 3 x UUP, 1 x DUP, 1 x SDLP, 1 x Independent Nationalist
2001: 2 x UUP, 2 x DUP, 1 x SDLP, 1 x Independent
1997-2001 Change: DUP gain from UUP, Independent Nationalist becomes Independent

Knockiveagh - 6 seats
Party	Candidate	FPv%	Count					
Party	Candidate	FPv%	1	2	3	4	5	6
SDLP	Seamus Doyle*	18.29%	1,351					
UUP	John Ingram*	16.28%	1,202					
DUP	Wilfred McFadden*	14.68%	1,084					
UUP	John Hanna*	8.35%	617	622	669.47	734.43	1,122.43	
DUP	Stephen Herron	9.95%	735	736	744.57	963.64	1,089.19	
Independent	Malachy McCartan*	10.40%	768	921	922.16	936.75	951.48	1,014.62
Sinn Féin	Brendan Curran	10.22%	755	874	874.37	875.6	879.67	882.75
UUP	Violet Cromie*	6.58%	486	492	571.88	648.68		
UK Unionist	Stephen Briggs	5.24%	387	388	392.83			
Electorate: 9,937 Valid: 7,385 (74.32%) Spoilt: 108 Quota: 1,056 Turnout: 7,493 (75.41%)
