= 2019 Armagh City, Banbridge and Craigavon Borough Council election =

2019 Northern Irish local government election

2019 Armagh, Banbridge and Craigavon Borough Council election
- 2 May 2019

All 41 council seats 21 seats needed for a majority
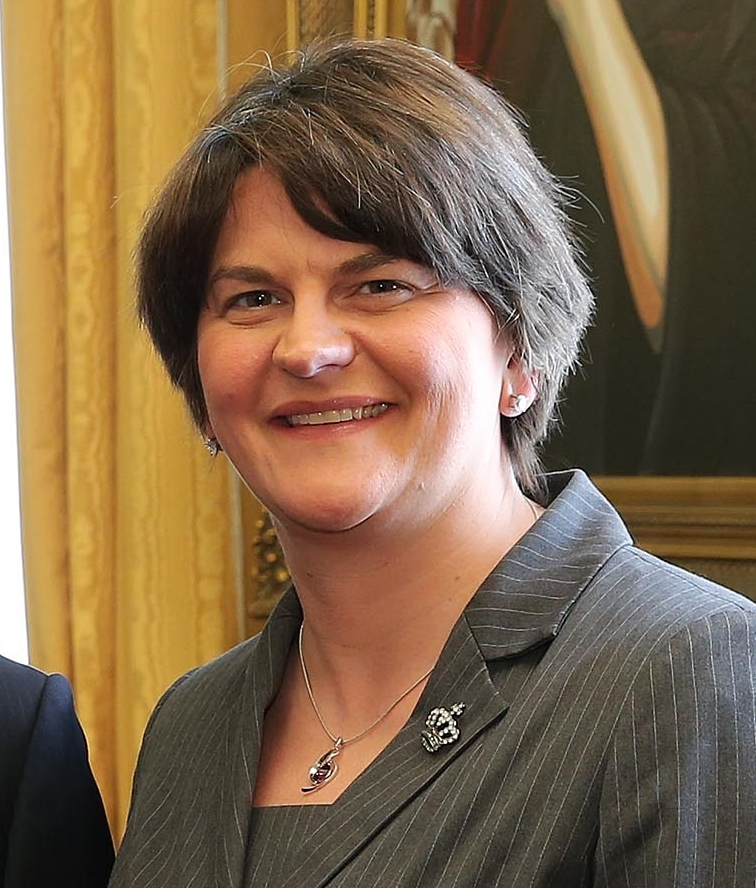

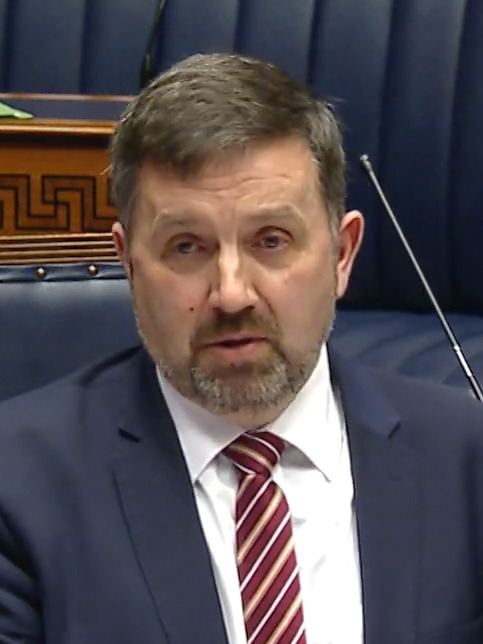

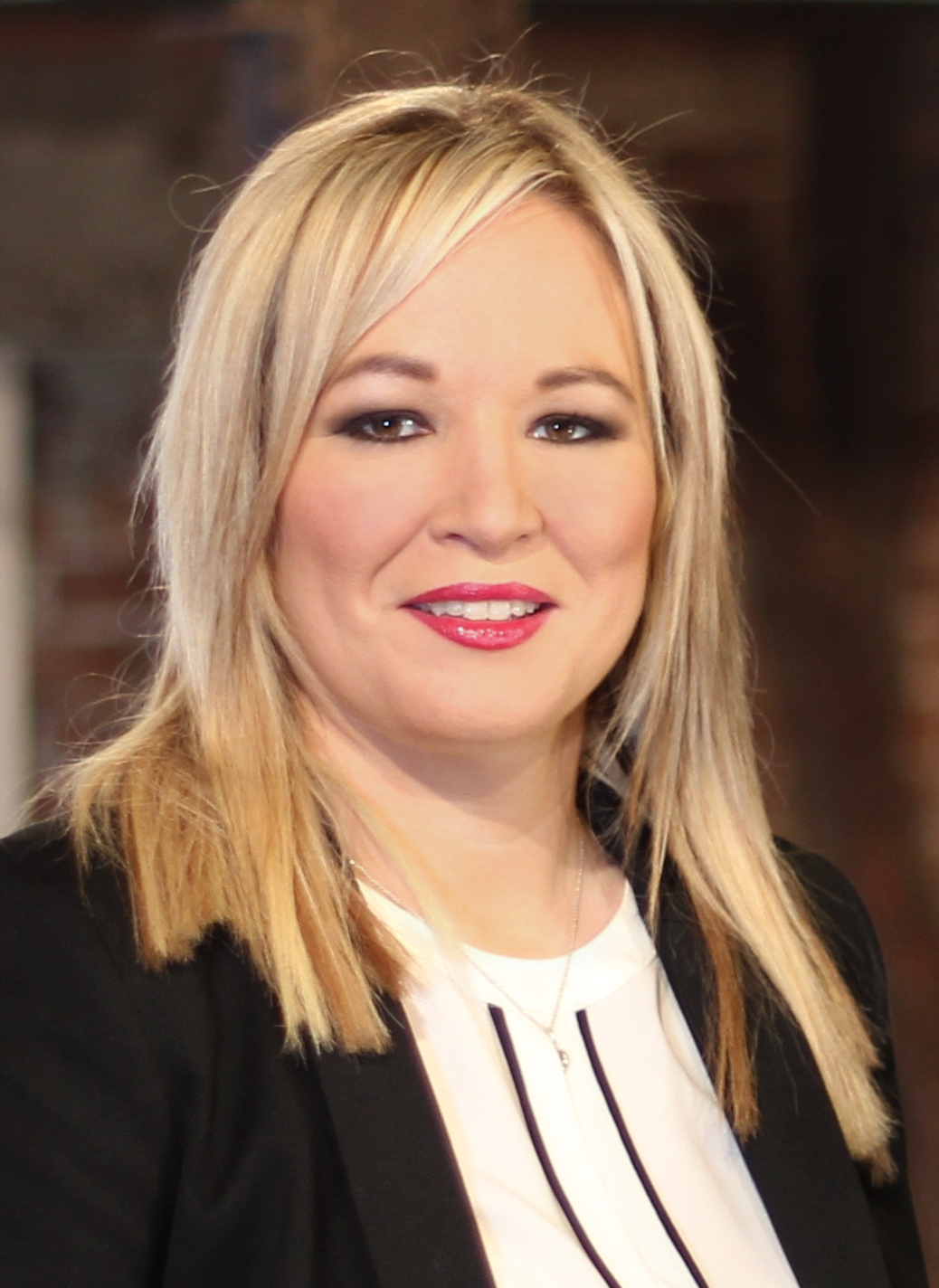

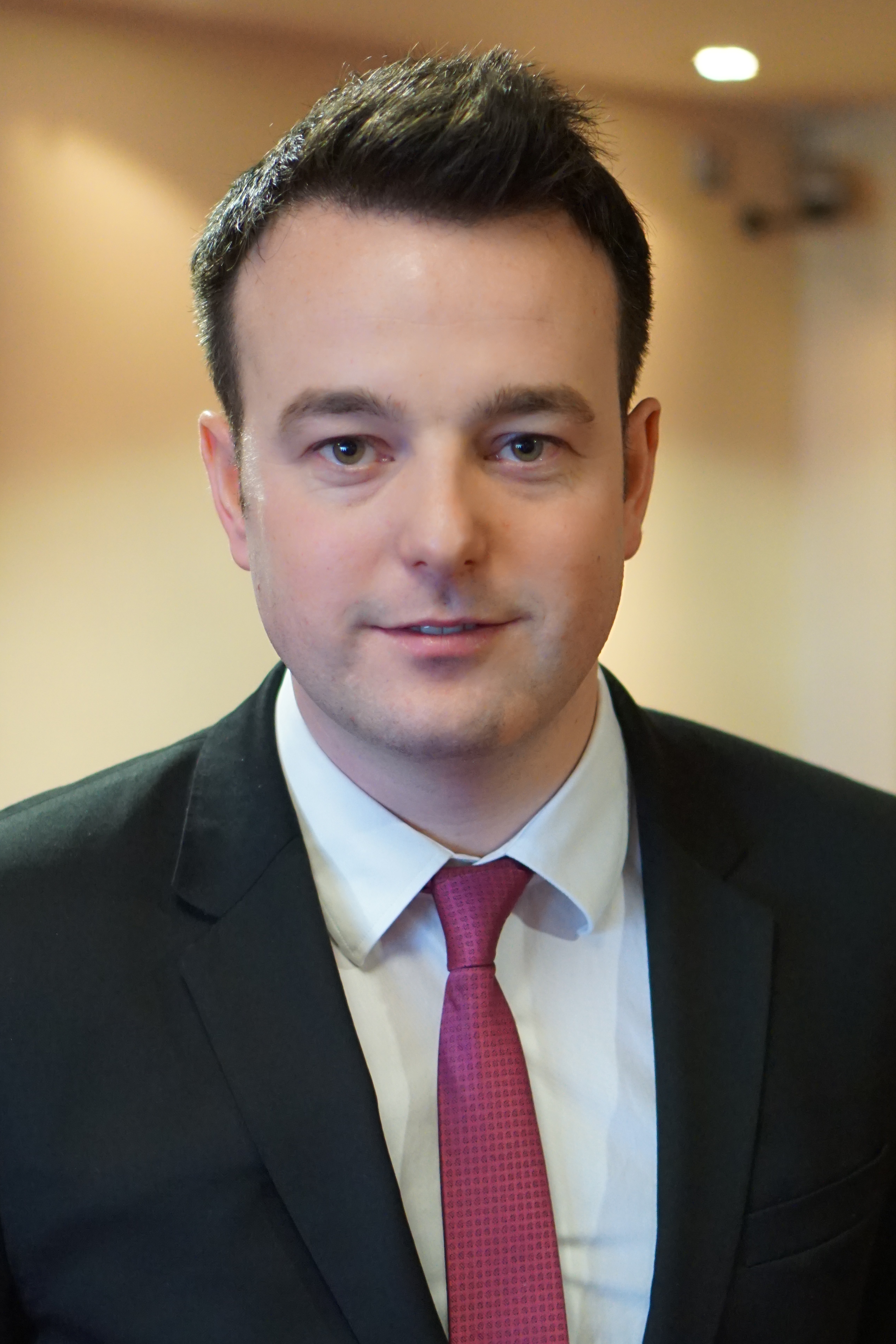

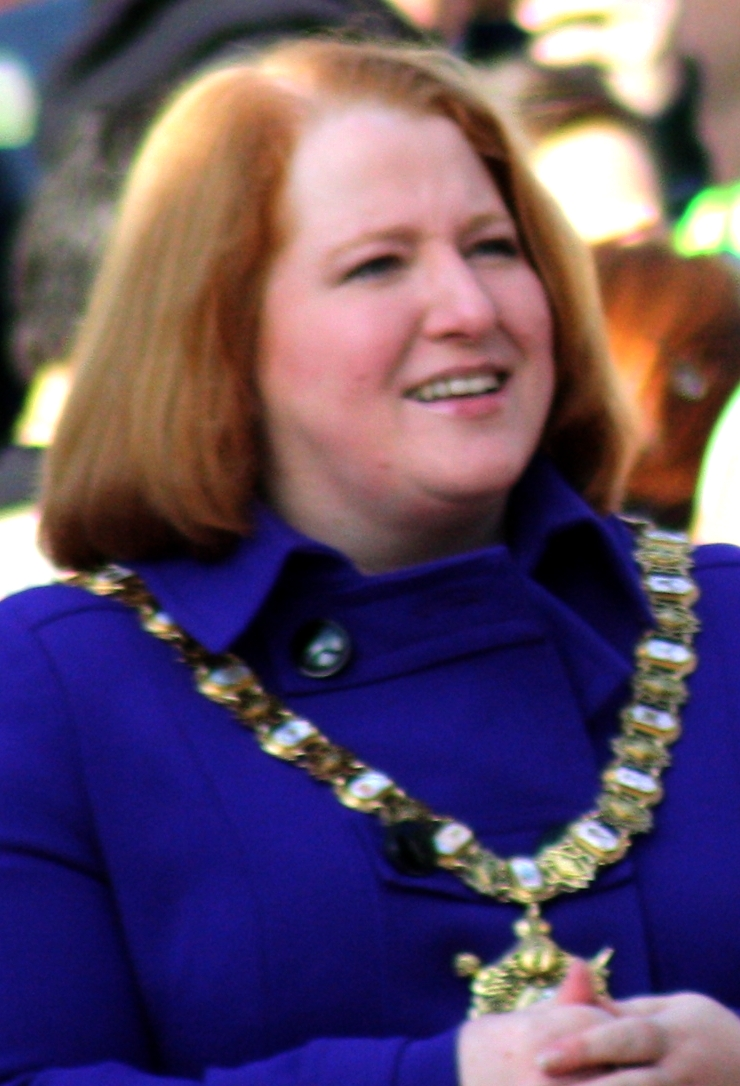

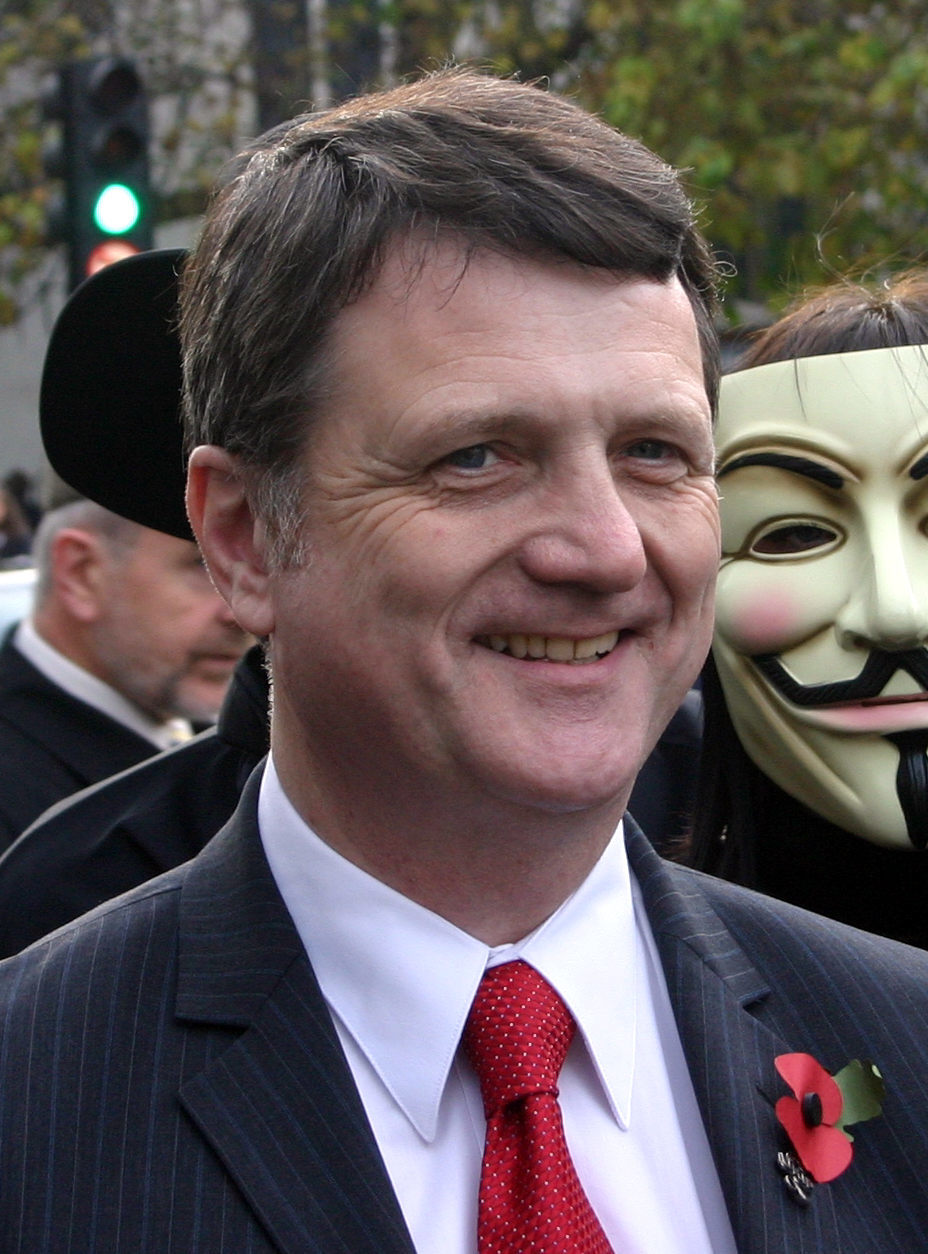
| | First party | Second party | Third party |
|---|---|---|---|
| Leader | Arlene Foster | Robin Swann | Michelle O'Neill |
| Party | DUP | UUP | Sinn Féin |
| Seats won | 11 | 10 | 10 |
| Seat change | ▼2 | ▼2 | ▲2 |
| | Fourth party | Fifth party | Sixth party |
| Leader | Colum Eastwood | Naomi Long |
| Party | SDLP | Alliance | Independent |
| Seats won | 6 | 3 | 1 |
| Seat change | 0 | ▲3 | 0 |
| | Seventh party |
| Leader | Gerard Batten |
| Party | UKIP |
| Seats won | 0 |
| Seat change | ▼1 |
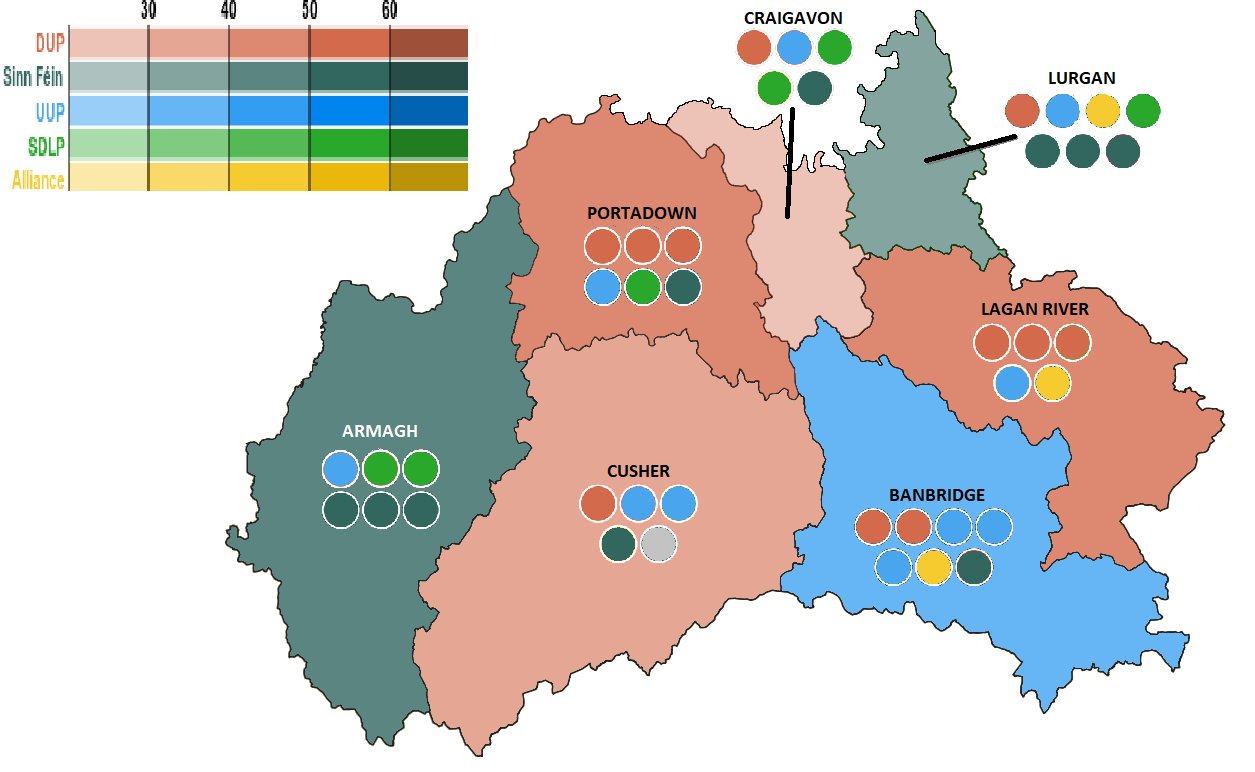
- Armagh City, Banbridge and Craigavon 2019 Council Election Results by DEA (Shaded by the plurality of FPVs)

Elections to Armagh City, Banbridge and Craigavon Borough Council, part of the Northern Ireland local elections on 2 May 2019, returned 41 members to the council using Single Transferable Vote. The Democratic Unionist Party were the largest party in both first-preference votes and seats.

== Election results ==
Armagh City, Banbridge and Craigavon Borough Council Election Result 2019
| Party | Seats | Gains | Losses | Net gain/loss | Seats % | Votes % | Votes | +/− |
|---|---|---|---|---|---|---|---|---|
| DUP | 11 | 0 | 3 | ▼3 | 26.8 | 27.9 | 21,840 | ▲3.3 |
| Sinn Féin | 10 | 2 | 0 | ▲2 | 24.4 | 22.0 | 17,154 | ▲1.0 |
| UUP | 10 | 0 | 1 | ▼1 | 24.4 | 21.6 | 16,881 | ▼4.5 |
| SDLP | 6 | 2 | 2 | 0 | 14.6 | 13.5 | 10,513 | ▼0.5 |
| Alliance | 3 | 3 | 0 | ▲3 | 7.3 | 7.8 | 6,111 | ▲4.4 |
| Independent | 1 | 0 | 0 | 0 | 2.4 | 3.5 | 2,761 | ▼0.1 |
| TUV | 0 | 0 | 0 | 0 | 0.0 | 2.0 | 1,554 | ▼0.6 |
| Aontú | 0 | 0 | 0 | 0 | 0.0 | 1.3 | 1,052 | New |
| UKIP | 0 | 0 | 1 | ▼1 | 0.0 | 0.4 | 278 | ▼1.4 |

Note: "Votes" are the first preference votes.

The overall turnout was 52.81% with a total of 78,144 valid votes cast. A total of 1,165 ballots were rejected.

== Districts summary ==
Results of the Armagh City, Banbridge and Craigavon Borough Council election, 2019 by district
| Ward | % | Cllrs | % | Cllrs | % | Cllrs | % | Cllrs | % | Cllrs | % | Cllrs | Total Cllrs |
| Ward | DUP | | Sinn Féin | | UUP | | SDLP | | Alliance | | Others | | Total Cllrs |
|---|---|---|---|---|---|---|---|---|---|---|---|---|---|
| Armagh | 12.9 | 0 | 40.3 | 3 | 13.3 | 1 | 21.5 | 2 | 5.3 | 0 | 6.7 | 0 | 6 |
| Banbridge | 23.0 | 2 | 14.1 | 1 | 36.1 | 3 | 10.8 | 0 | 11.7 | 1 | 4.2 | 0 | 7 |
| Craigavon | 26.1 | 1 | 21.3 | 1 | 19.7 | 1 | 23.3 | 2 | 7.2 | 0 | 2.4 | 0 | 5 |
| Cusher | 30.2 | 1 | 13.3 | 1 | 25.0 | 2 | 7.9 | 0 | 4.0 | 0 | 19.6 | 1 | 5 |
| Lagan River | 45.0 | 3 | 2.6 | 0 | 28.0 | 1 | 4.2 | 0 | 10.8 | 1 | 9.5 | 0 | 5 |
| Lurgan | 23.1 | 1 | 36.9 | 3 | 12.7 | 1 | 16.4 | 1 | 11.0 | 1 | 0.0 | 0 | 7 |
| Portadown | 41.3 | 3 | 18.4 | 1 | 18.0 | 1 | 8.6 | 1 | 5.1 | 0 | 8.6 | 0 | 6 |
| Total | 27.9 | 11 | 22.0 | 10 | 21.6 | 10 | 13.5 | 6 | 7.8 | 3 | 7.2 | 1 | 41 |

== District results ==
=== Armagh ===
2014: 2 x Sinn Féin, 2 x SDLP, 1 x UUP, 1 x DUP
2019: 3 x Sinn Féin, 2 x SDLP, 1 x UUP
2014-2019 Change: Sinn Féin gain from DUP

Armagh - 6 seats
| Party | Candidate | FPv% | Count | | | | |
| Party | Candidate | FPv% | 1 | 2 | 3 | 4 | 5 |
|---|---|---|---|---|---|---|---|
| Sinn Féin | Garath Keating* † | 16.01% | 2,037 | | | | |
| Sinn Féin | Jackie Donnelly | 13.18% | 1,677 | 1,680 | 1,761.3 | 1,818.1 | |
| SDLP | Mealla Campbell* † | 9.79% | 1,246 | 1,250 | 1,267.8 | 1,550.6 | 1,819.6 |
| SDLP | Thomas O'Hanlon* | 11.72% | 1,491 | 1,493 | 1,502.2 | 1,615.6 | 1,811.5 |
| UUP | Sam Nicholson* | 13.34% | 1,697 | 1,699 | 1,699 | 1,764 | 1,775 |
| Sinn Féin | Darren McNally* | 11.11% | 1,413 | 1,415 | 1,493.8 | 1,522.3 | 1,680.3 |
| DUP | Freda Donnelly* | 12.87% | 1,638 | 1,638 | 1,638.3 | 1,649.3 | 1,670.6 |
| Aontú | Martin Kelly | 6.46% | 822 | 830 | 840.1 | 903.5 | |
| Alliance | Jackie Coade | 5.30% | 674 | 677 | 681.9 | | |
| Independent | Pol Oh-Again | 0.22% | 28 | | | | |
Electorate: 21,982 Valid: 12,723 (57.88%) Spoilt: 191 Quota: 1,818 Turnout: 12,914 (58.75%)

=== Banbridge ===
2014: 3 x UUP, 2 x DUP, 1 x Sinn Féin, 1 x SDLP
2019: 3 x UUP, 2 x DUP, 1 x Sinn Féin, 1 x Alliance
2014-2019 Change: Alliance gain from SDLP

Banbridge - 7 seats
| Party | Candidate | FPv% | Count | | | | | | | |
| Party | Candidate | FPv% | 1 | 2 | 3 | 4 | 5 | 6 | 7 | 8 |
|---|---|---|---|---|---|---|---|---|---|---|
| UUP | Glenn Barr* | 14.53% | 1,764 | | | | | | | |
| DUP | Paul Greenfield* | 12.88% | 1,563 | | | | | | | |
| UUP | Ian Burns* | 10.45% | 1,273 | 1,421.68 | 1,554.68 | | | | | |
| Sinn Féin | Kevin Savage* | 8.55% | 1,038 | 1,038.14 | 1,040.14 | 1,533.14 | | | | |
| UUP | Jill Macauley | 11.12% | 1,350 | 1,418.88 | 1,504.28 | 1,506.28 | 1,509.24 | 1,533.11 | | |
| DUP | Junior McCrum* † | 10.15% | 1,232 | 1,250.06 | 1,478.32 | 1,481.32 | 1,508.4 | 1,519.56 | | |
| Alliance | Brian Pope | 11.74% | 1,425 | 1,429.34 | 1,442.62 | 1,476.76 | 1,476.94 | 1,477.25 | 1,480.04 | 1,485.93 |
| SDLP | Seamus Doyle* | 10.78% | 1,309 | 1,310.96 | 1,317.96 | 1,454.76 | 1,455.16 | 1,455.78 | 1,465.95 | 1,468.43 |
| Sinn Féin | Vincent McAleenan | 5.57% | 676 | 676.28 | 676.42 | | | | | |
| TUV | William Martin | 4.19% | 508 | 511.12 | | | | | | |
Electorate: 24,418 Valid: 12,138 (49.71%) Spoilt: 136 Quota: 1,518 Turnout: 12,274 (50.27%)

=== Craigavon ===
2014: 2 x DUP, 1 x SDLP, 1 x Sinn Féin, 1 x UUP
2019: 2 x SDLP, 1 x DUP, 1 x Sinn Féin, 1 x UUP
2014-2019 Change: SDLP gain from DUP

Craigavon - 5 seats
| Party | Candidate | FPv% | Count | | | | | | |
| Party | Candidate | FPv% | 1 | 2 | 3 | 4 | 5 | 6 | 7 |
|---|---|---|---|---|---|---|---|---|---|
| Sinn Féin | Catherine Nelson | 13.77% | 1,332 | 1,388 | 1,430 | 2,072 | | | |
| SDLP | Thomas Larkham | 12.86% | 1,244 | 1,272 | 1,524 | 1,591 | 1,817 | | |
| UUP | Kenneth Twyble* | 10.72% | 1,037 | 1,037 | 1,135 | 1,136 | 1,139 | 1,141 | 1,803 |
| SDLP | Declan McAlinden* | 10.48% | 1,014 | 1,083 | 1,191 | 1,218 | 1,324 | 1,470 | 1,544 |
| DUP | Margaret Tinsley* | 14.64% | 1,416 | 1,416 | 1,427 | 1,427 | 1,428 | 1,428 | 1,506 |
| DUP | Robert Smith* | 11.42% | 1,105 | 1,108 | 1,118 | 1,119 | 1,121 | 1,121 | 1,235 |
| UUP | Kate Evans | 9.00% | 871 | 873 | 995 | 996 | 998 | 1,002 | |
| Sinn Féin | Michael Tallon | 7.51% | 727 | 749 | 761 | | | | |
| Alliance | Sean Hagan | 7.22% | 699 | 725 | | | | | |
| Aontú | Fergal Lennon* | 2.38% | 230 | | | | | | |
Electorate: 18,798 Valid: 9,675 (51.47%) Spoilt: 176 Quota: 1,613 Turnout: 9,851 (52.40%)

=== Cusher ===
2014: 2 x UUP, 1 x DUP, 1 x SDLP, 1 x Independent
2019: 2 x UUP, 1 x DUP, 1 x Sinn Féin, 1 x Independent
2014-2019 Change: Sinn Féin gain from SDLP

Cusher - 5 seats
| Party | Candidate | FPv% | Count | | | | | | |
| Party | Candidate | FPv% | 1 | 2 | 3 | 4 | 5 | 6 | 7 |
|---|---|---|---|---|---|---|---|---|---|
| DUP | Gareth Wilson* | 19.62% | 2,248 | | | | | | |
| Independent | Paul Berry* | 17.54% | 2,009 | | | | | | |
| Sinn Féin | Bróna Haughey | 13.26% | 1,519 | 1,519.15 | 1,552.3 | 2,094.3 | | | |
| UUP | Jim Speers* | 14.25% | 1,633 | 1,697.05 | 1,827.3 | 1,931.3 | | | |
| UUP | Gordon Kennedy* | 10.73% | 1,229 | 1,254.95 | 1,393.5 | 1,465.5 | 1,520.5 | 1,567.6 | 1,585.96 |
| DUP | Quincey Dougan | 10.60% | 1,215 | 1,445.1 | 1,514.95 | 1,527.4 | 1,538.4 | 1,581.4 | 1,584.12 |
| SDLP | Seamus Livingstone | 7.86% | 901 | 902.45 | 1,106.05 | | | | |
| Alliance | Gareth Hay | 4.03% | 462 | 463.05 | | | | | |
| Independent | Paul Bowbanks | 2.10% | 241 | 253.15 | | | | | |
Electorate: 18,496 Valid: 11,457 (61.94%) Spoilt: 112 Quota: 1,910 Turnout: 11,569 (62.55%)

=== Lagan River ===
2014: 3 x DUP, 2 x UUP
2019: 3 x DUP, 1 x UUP, 1 x Alliance
2014-2019 Change: Alliance gain from UUP

Lagan River - 5 seats
| Party | Candidate | FPv% | Count | | | | | | | | |
| Party | Candidate | FPv% | 1 | 2 | 3 | 4 | 5 | 6 | 7 | 8 | 9 |
|---|---|---|---|---|---|---|---|---|---|---|---|
| DUP | Mark Baxter* | 21.12% | 1,876 | | | | | | | | |
| UUP | Kyle Savage | 18.17% | 1,614 | | | | | | | | |
| DUP | Paul Rankin* †† | 16.25% | 1,444 | 1,519.39 | | | | | | | |
| Alliance | Eóin Tennyson † | 10.81% | 960 | 963.36 | 968 | 991.29 | 991.4 | 1,027.4 | 1,064.98 | 1,495.98 | |
| DUP | Tim McClelland | 7.63% | 678 | 945.96 | 960.36 | 988.12 | 1,020.79 | 1,020.79 | 1,049.72 | 1,052.74 | 1,352.02 |
| UUP | Olive Mercer | 9.80% | 871 | 981.37 | 987.29 | 1,010.09 | 1,013.83 | 1,014.25 | 1,102.37 | 1,141.06 | 1,311.62 |
| TUV | Samuel Morrison | 5.62% | 499 | 511.39 | 517.55 | 542.58 | 543.13 | 543.13 | 581.51 | 588.51 | |
| SDLP | John O'Hare | 4.15% | 369 | 369.42 | 370.3 | 372.38 | 372.38 | 548.38 | 559.46 | | |
| Independent | Sammy Ogle | 2.44% | 217 | 220.36 | 222.92 | 234 | 234.33 | 238.33 | | | |
| Sinn Féin | Tony Gorrell | 2.56% | 227 | 227.84 | 227.84 | 228.84 | 228.84 | | | | |
| UKIP | Jordan Stewart | 1.45% | 129 | 133.2 | 134.88 | | | | | | |
Electorate: 17,249 Valid: 8,884 (51.50%) Spoilt: 75 Quota: 1,481 Turnout: 8,959 (51.94%)

=== Lurgan ===
2014: 3 x Sinn Féin, 2 x DUP, 1 x UUP, 1 x SDLP
2019: 3 x Sinn Féin, 1 x DUP, 1 x UUP, 1 x SDLP, 1 x Alliance
2014-2019 Change: Alliance gain from DUP

Lurgan - 7 seats
| Party | Candidate | FPv% | Count | | | | | |
| Party | Candidate | FPv% | 1 | 2 | 3 | 4 | 5 | 6 |
|---|---|---|---|---|---|---|---|---|
| Sinn Féin | Keith Haughlan* | 16.39% | 1,974 | | | | | |
| UUP | Louise McKinstry | 12.65% | 1,524 | | | | | |
| Sinn Féin | Liam Mackle | 9.88% | 1,190 | 1,362.32 | 1,595.32 | | | |
| SDLP | Joe Nelson* † | 8.68% | 1,046 | 1,060.64 | 1,104.52 | 1,860.52 | | |
| Alliance | Peter Lavery | 10.97% | 1,321 | 1,347.16 | 1,371.12 | 1,462.28 | 1,701.05 | |
| DUP | Stephen Moutray* | 12.48% | 1,504 | 1,504.24 | 1,504.24 | 1,504.24 | 1,504.87 | 1,505.5 |
| Sinn Féin | Sorcha McGeown | 6.83% | 823 | 1,010.44 | 1,195.4 | 1,255.84 | 1,388.61 | 1,457.44 |
| DUP | Terry McWilliams* | 10.64% | 1,282 | 1,282.64 | 1,283.64 | 1,284.64 | 1,285.5 | 1,286.13 |
| SDLP | Ciarán Toman | 7.71% | 928 | 948.08 | 957.72 | | | |
| Sinn Féin | Noel McGeown | 3.77% | 454 | 496.88 | | | | |
Electorate: 25,336 Valid: 12,044 (47.54%) Spoilt: 251 Quota: 1,506 Turnout: 12,295 (48.53%)

=== Portadown ===
2014: 2 x DUP, 2 x UUP, 1 x Sinn Féin, 1 x UKIP
2019: 3 x DUP, 1 x UUP, 1 x Sinn Féin, 1 x SDLP
2014-2019 Change: DUP and SDLP gain from UUP and UKIP

Portadown - 6 seats
| Party | Candidate | FPv% | Count | | | | | | | | |
| Party | Candidate | FPv% | 1 | 2 | 3 | 4 | 5 | 6 | 7 | 8 | 9 |
|---|---|---|---|---|---|---|---|---|---|---|---|
| DUP | Darryn Causby* ‡‡† | 18.51% | 2,077 | | | | | | | | |
| DUP | Sydney Anderson | 15.11% | 1,696 | | | | | | | | |
| Sinn Féin | Paul Duffy* | 14.92% | 1,675 | | | | | | | | |
| UUP | Julie Flaherty* | 13.47% | 1,512 | 1,591.2 | 1,607.2 | | | | | | |
| DUP | Lavelle McIlwrath | 7.72% | 866 | 1,157.72 | 1,210.62 | 1,238.87 | 1,238.99 | 1,330.67 | 1,331.67 | 1,343.91 | 1,618.91 |
| SDLP | Eamonn McNeill | 8.62% | 967 | 967.44 | 967.79 | 967.84 | 976.36 | 983.36 | 1,250.25 | 1,583.4 | 1,590.4 |
| UUP | Arnold Hatch* | 4.51% | 506 | 518.1 | 522.9 | 544.93 | 545.21 | 633.08 | 636.32 | 758.94 | 976.94 |
| TUV | Darrin Foster | 4.87% | 547 | 575.38 | 580.73 | 615.96 | 616.24 | 697.6 | 698.64 | 713.25 | |
| Alliance | Emma Hutchinson | 5.08% | 570 | 573.3 | 573.85 | 580.9 | 582.58 | 596.02 | 630.71 | | |
| Sinn Féin | Callum O'Dufaigh | 3.49% | 392 | 392.44 | 392.54 | 392.54 | 446.02 | 448.06 | | | |
| Independent | David Jones* | 2.37% | 266 | 289.98 | 291.53 | 340.39 | 340.43 | | | | |
| UKIP | David Jameson | 1.33% | 149 | 163.08 | 164.88 | | | | | | |
Electorate: 21,698 Valid: 11,223 (51.72%) Spoilt: 224 Quota: 1,604 Turnout: 11,447 (52.76%)

== Changes during the term ==
=== † Co-options ===
| Date co-opted | Electoral Area | Party | Outgoing | Co-optee | Reason |
|---|---|---|---|---|---|
| 1 January 2021 | Armagh | SDLP | Mealla Campbell | Grainne O'Neill | Campbell resigned. |
| 1 January 2021 | Lurgan | SDLP | Joe Nelson | Ciaran Toman | Nelson resigned. |
| 20 August 2021 | Banbridge | DUP | Junior McCrum | Ian Wilson | McCrum died. |
| 21 February 2022 | Lagan River | DUP | Paul Rankin | Keith Parke | Rankin was co-opted to the Northern Ireland Assembly. |
| 23 February 2022 | Armagh | Sinn Féin | Garath Keating | Fergal Donnelly | Keating resigned. |
| 26 May 2022 | Lagan River | Alliance | Eóin Tennyson | Jessica Johnston | Tennyson was elected to the Northern Ireland Assembly. |
| 31 May 2022 | Lagan River | DUP | Keith Parke | Paul Rankin | Rankin returned to council having briefly been co-opted to the Northern Ireland Assembly before the Assembly election. |
| 7 November 2022 | Portadown | DUP | Darryn Causby | Kyle Moutray | Causby resigned. |

=== ‡ Changes in affiliation ===
| Date | Electoral Area | Name | Previous affiliation | New affiliation | Circumstance |
|---|---|---|---|---|---|
| 18 June 2021 | Portadown | Darryn Causby | DUP | Independent | Resigned from the DUP over disagreements with the new party leadership. |
| 23 November 2021 | Portadown | Darryn Causby | Independent | DUP | Rejoined the DUP after resolving disagreements with the new party leadership. |

=== – Suspensions ===
None

Last updated 7 November 2022.

Current composition: see Armagh City, Banbridge and Craigavon Borough Council
