= 2011 Banbridge District Council election =

Local govt election in Northern Ireland

- 5 May 2011

All 17 seats to Banbridge District Council 9 seats needed for a majority
	First party	Second party	Third party
Party	UUP	DUP	SDLP
Seats won	7	5	2
Seat change	▲2	▼2	▼1
	Fourth party	Fifth party
Party	Sinn Féin	Alliance
Seats won	2	1
Seat change	▲1	Steady
- Party with the most votes by district.

Elections to Banbridge District Council were held on 5 May 2011 on the same day as the other Northern Irish local government elections. The election used three district electoral areas to elect a total of 17 councillors.

== Election results ==
Banbridge District Council Election Result 2011
Party	Seats	Gains	Losses	Net gain/loss	Seats %	Votes %	Votes	+/−
UUP	7	2	0	▲2	41.2	33.8	6,167	▲1.4
DUP	5	0	2	▼2	29.4	32.4	5,904	▼5.9
SDLP	2	0	1	▼1	11.8	13.2	2,409	▼2.7
Sinn Féin	2	1	0	▲1	11.8	11.4	2,071	▲5.1
Alliance	1	0	0	Steady	5.9	4.9	892	▲0.4
TUV	0	0	0	Steady	0.0	2.5	458	New
Independent	0	0	0	Steady	0.0	1.8	335	▼0.8

Note: "Votes" are the first preference votes.

== Districts summary ==
Results of the Banbridge District Council election, 2011 by district
Ward	%	Cllrs	%	Cllrs	%	Cllrs	%	Cllrs	%	Cllrs	%	Cllrs	Total Cllrs
Ward	UUP		DUP		SDLP		Sinn Féin		Alliance		Others		Total Cllrs
Banbridge Town	36.3	2	30.8	2	11.6	1	7.4	0	8.2	1	5.7	0	6
Dromore	26.0	2	44.2	2	8.3	0	10.2	1	7.0	0	4.3	0	5
Knockiveagh	38.6	3	23.0	1	19.1	1	16.0	1	0.0	0	3.3	0	6
Total	33.8	7	32.4	5	13.2	2	11.4	2	4.9	1	4.3	0	17

== Districts results ==
=== Banbridge Town ===
2005: 2 x UUP, 2 x DUP, 1 x SDLP, 1 x Alliance
2011: 2 x UUP, 2 x DUP, 1 x SDLP, 1 x Alliance
2005-2011 Change: No change

Banbridge Town - 6 seats
Party	Candidate	FPv%	Count							
Party	Candidate	FPv%	1	2	3	4	5	6	7	8
UUP	Joan Baird*	24.86%	1,466							
DUP	Junior McCrum*	17.60%	1,038							
UUP	Ian Burns*	11.46%	676	1,200.6						
DUP	Jim McElroy*	8.02%	473	518.58	750.57	917.01				
Alliance	Sheila McQuaid	8.19%	483	495.47	544.68	546.39	546.63	588.63	679.03	788.34
SDLP	Marie Hamilton	6.22%	367	375.17	389.97	391.11	391.27	450.7	655.84	684.07
Sinn Féin	Vincent McAleenan	7.38%	435	435.86	436.23	436.23	436.23	601.23	645.6	645.68
DUP	John McKinstry	5.22%	308	324.34	370.59	391.11	457.35	460.35	468.6	
SDLP	Cassie McDermott*	5.36%	316	325.46	339.52	340.66	340.99	383.9		
Independent	Dessie Ward*	5.68%	335	335.43	335.8	335.8	335.8			
Electorate: 11,532 Valid: 5,897 (51.14%) Spoilt: 124 Quota: 843 Turnout: 6,021 (52.21%)

=== Dromore ===
2005: 3 x DUP, 1 x UUP, 1 x SDLP
2011: 2 x DUP, 2 x UUP, 1 x Sinn Féin
2005-2011 Change: UUP and Sinn Féin gain from DUP and SDLP

Dromore - 5 seats
Party	Candidate	FPv%	Count						
Party	Candidate	FPv%	1	2	3	4	5	6	7
DUP	Paul Rankin*	16.49%	967	1,013					
DUP	Hazel Gamble*	16.08%	943	983					
UUP	Carol Black	13.98%	820	883	976	982.23			
UUP	Olive Mercer	12.05%	707	751	842	850.01	850.86	851.7	923.7
Sinn Féin	Paul Gribben	10.18%	597	597	604	604	604	604	880
DUP	Norah Beare*	11.68%	685	705	746	766.47	770.38	773.74	814.74
SDLP	Louis Boyle	8.32%	488	488	601	601	601.17	601.17	
Alliance	David Griffin	6.97%	409	422					
TUV	Lyle Rea	4.25%	249						
Electorate: 10,290 Valid: 5,865 (57.00%) Spoilt: 59 Quota: 978 Turnout: 5,924 (57.57%)

=== Knockiveagh ===
2005: 2 x UUP, 2 x DUP, 1 x SDLP, 1 x Sinn Féin
2011: 3 x UUP, 1 x DUP, 1 x SDLP, 1 x Sinn Féin
2005-2011 Change: UUP gain from DUP

Knockiveagh - 6 seats
Party	Candidate	FPv%	Count				
Party	Candidate	FPv%	1	2	3	4	5
SDLP	Seamus Doyle*	19.12%	1,238				
UUP	Elizabeth Ingram	17.53%	1,135				
Sinn Féin	Brendan Curran	16.05%	1,039				
DUP	David Herron*	13.42%	869	922.9	991.9		
UUP	John Hanna*	10.67%	691	803.7	844.4	945.1	
UUP	Glenn Barr	10.38%	672	763.7	815.9	893.61	955.11
DUP	Ian Wilson	9.59%	621	645.5	690.3	711.96	764.46
TUV	Stephen Herron*	3.23%	209	234.9			
Electorate: 11,012 Valid: 6,474 (58.79%) Spoilt: 105 Quota: 925 Turnout: 6,579 (59.74%)
