= Paul Rankin (politician) =

Northern Irish politician

Armagh City, Banbridge and Craigavon Borough Councillor for Lagan River
- Incumbent
- Assumed office 31 May 2022
- Preceded by: Keith Parke
- In office 22 May 2014 – 21 February 2022
- Preceded by: Council created
- Succeeded by: Keith Parke

Member of the Northern Ireland Assembly for Lagan Valley
- In office 14 March 2022 – 28 March 2022
- Preceded by: Edwin Poots
- Succeeded by: Emma Little-Pengelly

Member of Banbridge District Council
- In office 7 June 2001 – 22 May 2014
- Preceded by: Thomas Gribben
- Succeeded by: Council abolished
- Constituency: Dromore

Personal details
- Born: Dromore, County Down, Northern Ireland
- Party: Democratic Unionist Party

Paul Rankin is a Democratic Unionist Party (DUP) politician, serving as an Armagh City, Banbridge and Craigavon Borough Councillor for the Lagan River DEA since 2014 .

He was briefly a Member of the Northern Ireland Assembly (MLA) for Lagan Valley in March 2022, having replaced former party leader, Edwin Poots.

== Political career ==
Rankin was first elected to Banbridge District Council in 2001, representing the Dromore District.

He retained his council seat at the 2005 and 2011 council elections.

Rankin was elected onto the successor Armagh City, Banbridge and Craigavon Borough Council at the 2014 local elections, representing the Lagan River District; he was re-elected in 2019.

He was co-opted to the Northern Ireland Assembly for Lagan Valley, on 14 March 2022, after Edwin Poots switched to South Belfast, following the sudden death of Christopher Stalford in February 2022.

Rankin was only an MLA for two weeks after being co-opted, as the Assembly was dissolved at the end of March ahead of the May Assembly election, for which he was not selected as a DUP candidate in Lagan Valley.

Following the Assembly election, he was co-opted back onto the council, and was subsequently re-elected at the 2023 election.
