= 2024 Alliance Party of Northern Ireland deputy leadership election =

- 8 October 2024

190 party delegates 96 votes needed to win
Candidate
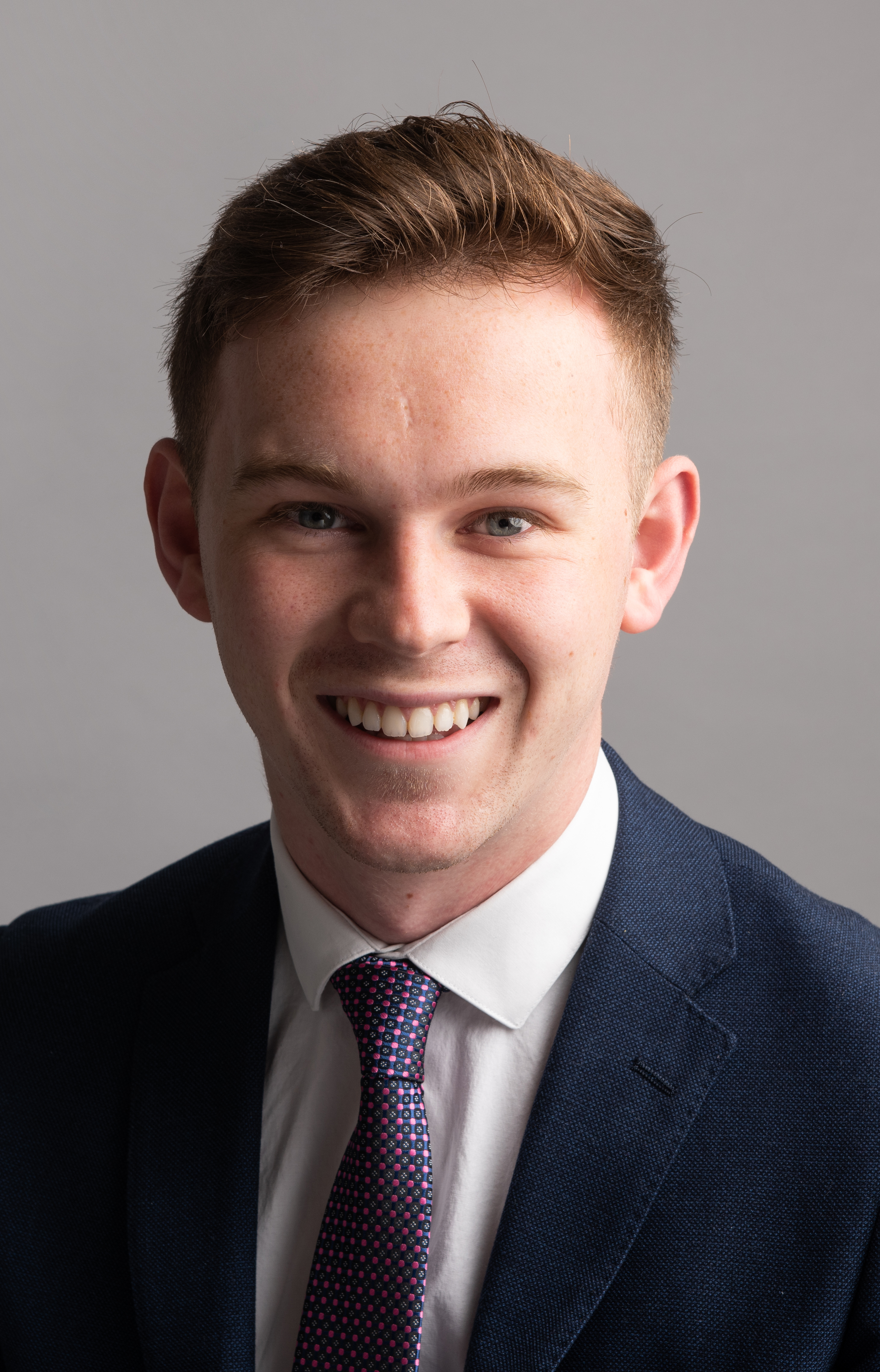
Eóin Tennyson
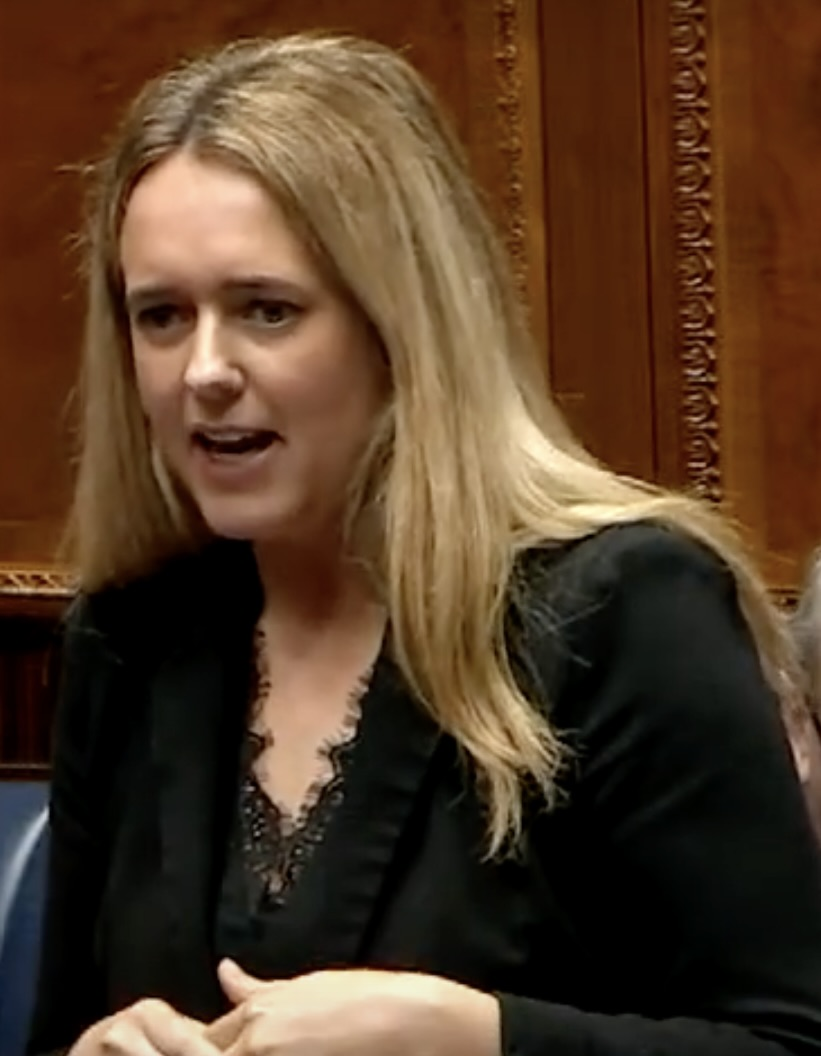
Kate Nicholl
Deputy Leader before election
Stephen Farry
Elected Deputy Leader
Eóin Tennyson

The 2024 Alliance Party of Northern Ireland deputy leadership election was held on 8 October 2024 following the resignation of Stephen Farry as Deputy leader of the Alliance Party. Farry had been in the role in the party since 2016. The party's finance spokesperson, Eóin Tennyson, was elected to succeed him.

Alliance MLAs Kate Nicholl and Eóin Tennyson went head-to-head to be the party’s next deputy leader.

== Background ==
Following the resignation of David Ford as Alliance leader on 5 October 2016, Stephen Farry was named by The Irish Times as a potential leadership contender alongside Naomi Long. However, he did not stand as a leadership candidate and was later elected unopposed as Deputy Leader of the party. Farry was elected in North Down at the 2019 United Kingdom general election and was the Alliance Party's sole Member of Parliament during the 2019-2024 Parliament. He lost his seat at the 2024 United Kingdom general election. It was reported that he would not take the seat in the Northern Ireland Assembly vacated by Sorcha Eastwood. Farry announced his resignation to delegates at the Alliance Party council meeting on 7 September 2024, but only made it public the day after. He said he announced his resignation at the party council as he wanted to "take the opportunity to personally thank the party membership for putting their trust in me as deputy leader from 2016 onwards, and for their ongoing support for me during my 30 years in elected politics".

== Campaign ==
The party's sole MP, Sorcha Eastwood, ruled herself out of the contest on 24 September 2024, saying her focus is on her constituency of Lagan Valley. In the wake of her success in winning Lagan Valley from the Democratic Unionist Party (DUP), it was thought that Eastwood would be the front-runner for the position. Having a deputy leader in Westminster, while Naomi Long is Justice Minister in Stormont, would be the natural choice, party sources said.

Both Agriculture Minister Andrew Muir and North Belfast MLA Nuala McAllister had ruled themselves out of the race.

Following the closure of nominations at 6pm on 24 September, it was revealed that South Belfast MLA Kate Nicholl and Upper Bann MLA Eóin Tennyson would run for the position. It was previously believed Tennyson would be the only candidate.

Tennyson became Stormont’s youngest MLA when he was elected in Upper Bann in 2022. He had been a councillor for the previous three years. He is the third openly gay MLA to serve, joining his party colleagues John Blair and Andrew Muir. He is one of Alliance’s most high-profile media performers.

Nicholl was elected to Stormont in 2022 when Alliance won two seats in South Belfast. She had been a member of Belfast City Council for six years previously, becoming Lord Mayor in 2021. She has been a passionate advocate for migrants and asylum seekers, and has been reported as "one of the best liked MLAs in Stormont across the parties."

The two candidates addressed the Alliance Party conference on 8 October. Eóin Tennyson was elected by a majority of delegates at the party conference. The exact result of the election was not announced.

== Procedure ==
A meeting of the Alliance Party Executive was held on 12 September to set out the arrangements for the election of the party's new deputy leader. Any Member of the Legislative Assembly (MLA) or Member of Parliament (MP) could be nominated. Farry remained in his post as acting deputy leader until a replacement was confirmed. Up to 10 delegates from each of the party’s 18 local associations met to elect a new deputy leader on 8 October 2024. Alliance’s 17 MLAs, sole MP, and the party’s 67 councillors also had a vote.

Key dates
Date	Event
13 September	Nominations opened.
24 September	Nominations closed.
8 October	Deputy leader elected.

== Candidates ==
=== Declared ===
- Kate Nicholl, MLA for Belfast South (since 2022)
- Eóin Tennyson, MLA for Upper Bann (since 2022)

=== Declined ===
- Sorcha Eastwood, MP for Lagan Valley (since 2024)
- Nuala McAllister, MLA for Belfast North (since 2022)
- Andrew Muir, Minister of Agriculture, Environment and Rural Affairs (since 2024) and MLA for North Down (since 2019)
