= Eóin Tennyson =

Deputy leader of Alliance Party (born 1998)

Eóin Tennyson MLA
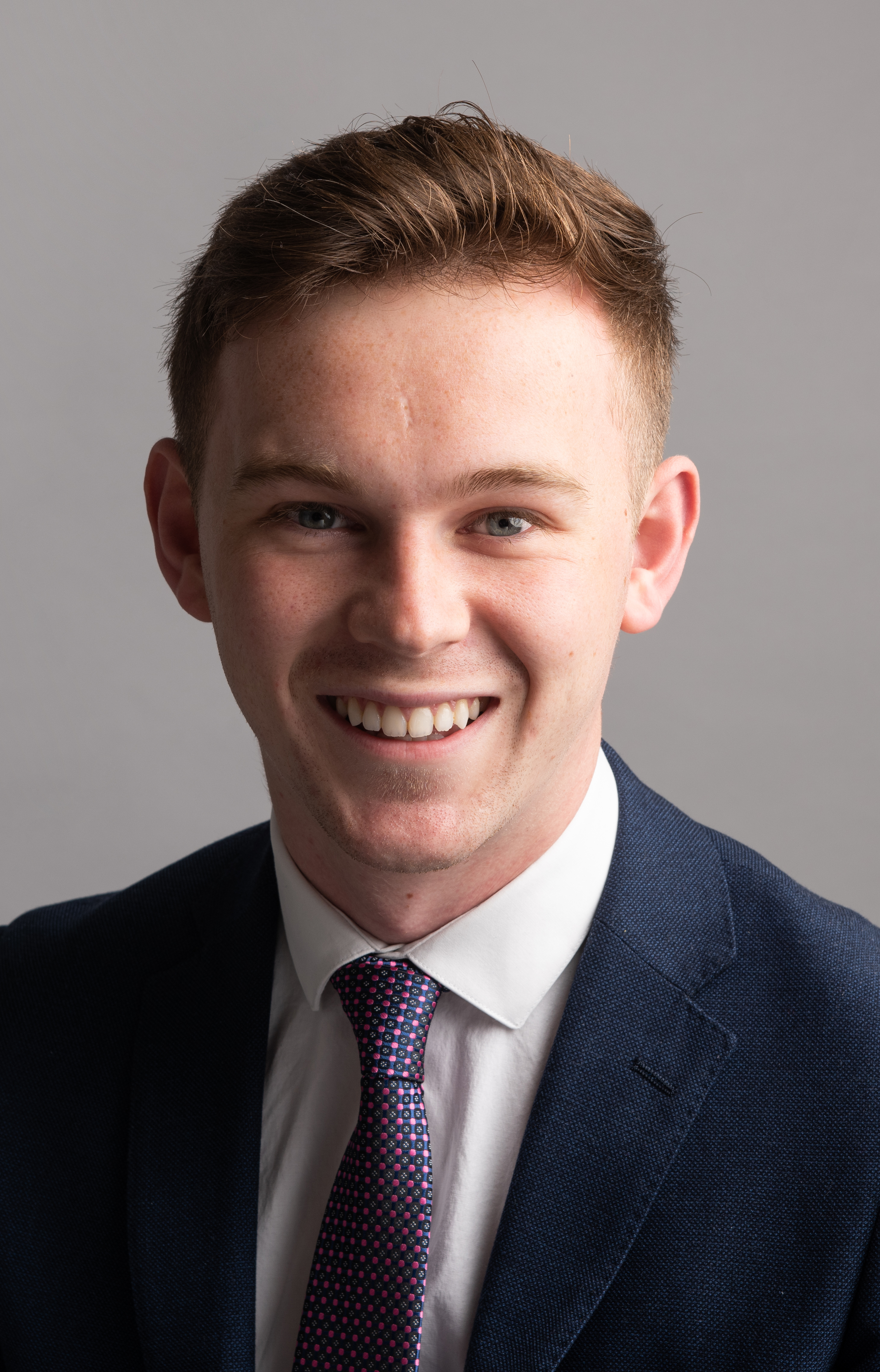

Deputy Leader of the Alliance Party
- Incumbent
- Assumed office 8 October 2024
- Leader: Naomi Long
- Preceded by: Stephen Farry

Member of the Northern Ireland Assembly for Upper Bann
- Incumbent
- Assumed office 5 May 2022
- Preceded by: Dolores Kelly

Member of Armagh City, Banbridge and Craigavon Borough Council
- In office 7 May 2019 – 5 May 2022
- Preceded by: Carol Black
- Succeeded by: Jessica Johnston
- Constituency: Lagan River

Personal details
- Born: 17 May 1998 (age 28) Maghery, Northern Ireland
- Party: Alliance
- Education: St. Patrick's Academy
- Alma mater: Queen's University Belfast (BSc); University College Dublin (MAcc)
- Occupation: Politician

Eóin Tennyson (born 17 May 1998) is a Northern Irish politician who has been the deputy leader of the Alliance Party of Northern Ireland since October 2024. He succeeded former deputy leader Stephen Farry who resigned from the position in 2024. He has been a Member of the Legislative Assembly (MLA) for Upper Bann since 2022, where he defeated former Social Democratic and Labour Party incumbent Dolores Kelly to become the youngest MLA for the constituency.

He is the youngest member of the Northern Ireland Assembly. Tennyson was a successful candidate in the 2024 Alliance Party deputy leadership election.

== Early life and career ==
Tennyson attended St. Patrick's Academy, a Catholic grammar school in Dungannon, County Tyrone. He studied accounting at Queen's University Belfast, graduating with bachelor of science degree in 2019. While at university, he was elected chair of Alliance Youth. In 2020, he obtained a Master of Accounting from the Michael Smurfit Graduate Business School at University College Dublin. He subsequently joined Deloitte in Belfast as an auditor and began training as a chartered accountant.

== Political career ==
=== Early career ===
Tennyson was elected to Armagh City, Banbridge and Craigavon Borough Council in the 2019 local elections, representing the Lagan River district electoral area. He polled 10.81% of the first-preference votes, and gained a seat at the expense of the Ulster Unionist Party.

In December, he contested the 2019 general election in Upper Bann, placing third with 13% of the vote. Though unsuccessful, he obtained a swing of 8.4% and polled ahead of Doug Beattie of the UUP and Dolores Kelly of the SDLP.

=== Member of the Legislative Assembly ===
Tennyson was elected as a Member of the Legislative Assembly (MLA) for Upper Bann in the 2022 Assembly election, outpolling the leader of the Ulster Unionist Party (UUP) and gaining a seat at the expense of the Social Democratic and Labour Party's (SDLP) Dolores Kelly. He polled 6,440 (11.5%) first-preference votes, increasing Alliance's share by 6.2% on the previous Assembly election. Tennyson became the first non-designated politician to be elected for the Upper Bann constituency. At 23-years-old, he also became the youngest MLA elected to the Assembly, and gained the unofficial title of Baby of the House. He is the third openly gay MLA to serve, joining his party colleagues John Blair and Andrew Muir.

During the course of the 2022 campaign, Tennyson faced abuse and intimidation. On one occasion, he was verbally abused and told to leave a 'Protestant area' when canvassing in Lurgan.

At a sitting of the Assembly on 30 May 2022, Tennyson accused the Democratic Unionist Party (DUP) of treating the public as "leverage", after the party refused to assent to the election of a Speaker and blocked formation of an Assembly in protest over the Northern Ireland Protocol. He subsequently called on the Secretary of State for Northern Ireland to stop the salaries of MLAs who refused to enter the Assembly in order to incentivise the DUP to "get back to work". Following the restoration of devolution in February 2024, Tennyson was appointed to the Committee for Finance and became a member of the Northern Ireland Policing Board.

He contested Upper Bann at the 2024 general election, coming third, with a small increase in his vote by 0.7%.

=== Deputy Leader of the Alliance Party ===
On 24 September 2024, Tennyson announced that he was nominated as a candidate in the 2024 Alliance Party deputy leadership election. While it was initially expected he would run unopposed, South Belfast MLA Kate Nicholl also put her name forward for the position. In a campaign announcement video uploaded to X, Tennyson stated that "my candidacy is not about a change in direction, but a change in gear. I'm keen to build on the momentum left behind by Stephen [Farry] and his enormous legacy and to work with Naomi [Long] and our vibrant leadership team to grow the party even further."

Tennyson was elected Deputy Leader of the Alliance Party on 8 October 2024. He said working with party leader Naomi Long is an "important role" that he was excited to begin.

== Personal life ==
Tennyson came out as gay at age 19.

Northern Ireland Assembly
| Preceded by Dolores Kelly | MLA for Upper Bann; 2022–present | Incumbent |
