= Dromore (District Electoral Area) =

District electoral areas in Banbridge, Northern Ireland

Dromore DEA (1993-2014) within Banbridge

Dromore was one of the three district electoral areas in Banbridge, Northern Ireland which existed from 1985 to 2014. The district elected five members to Banbridge District Council, and formed part of the Lagan Valley constituencies for the Northern Ireland Assembly and UK Parliament.

It was created for the 1985 local elections, and contained the wards of Croob, Dromore North, Dromore South, Garran and Quilly. It was abolished for the 2014 local elections and largely moved into the Lagan River DEA.

== Councillors ==
Election	Councillor (Party)	Councillor (Party)	Councillor (Party)	Councillor (Party)	Councillor (Party)
2011	Paul Gribben (Sinn Féin)	Carol Black (UUP)	Olive Mercer (UUP)	Paul Rankin (DUP)	Hazel Gamble (DUP)
2008	Paul Gribben (Sinn Féin)	Carol Black (UUP)	Norah Beare (DUP/ (UUP)	Paul Rankin (DUP)	David Herron (DUP)
2005	Cassie McDermott (SDLP)	Tyrone Howe (UUP)	Norah Beare (DUP/ (UUP)	Paul Rankin (DUP)	David Herron (DUP)
2001	Cassie McDermott (SDLP)	William Martin (UUP)	Norah Beare (DUP/ (UUP)	Paul Rankin (DUP)	David Herron (DUP)
1997	Cassie McDermott (SDLP)	William Martin (UUP)	William McCracken (UUP)	Thomas Gribben (UUP)	David Herron (DUP)
1993	Cassie McDermott (SDLP)	William Martin (UUP)	William McCracken (UUP)	Drew Nelson (UUP)	David Herron (DUP)
1989	Cassie McDermott (SDLP)	William Martin (UUP)	William McCracken (UUP)	Drew Nelson (UUP)	Robert Hill (UUP)
1985	Cassie McDermott (SDLP)	William Martin (UUP)	Robert Barr (UUP)	Brian Biggerstaff (DUP)	Robert Hill (UUP)

== 2011 Election ==
2005: 3 x DUP, 1 x UUP, 1 x SDLP

2011: 2 x DUP, 2 x UUP, 1 x Sinn Féin

2005-2011 Change: UUP and Sinn Féin gain from DUP and SDLP

Dromore - 5 seats
Party	Candidate	FPv%	Count						
Party	Candidate	FPv%	1	2	3	4	5	6	7
DUP	Paul Rankin*	16.49%	967	1,013					
DUP	Hazel Gamble*	16.08%	943	983					
UUP	Carol Black	13.98%	820	883	976	982.23			
UUP	Olive Mercer	12.05%	707	751	842	850.01	850.86	851.7	923.7
Sinn Féin	Paul Gribben	10.18%	597	597	604	604	604	604	880
DUP	Norah Beare*	11.68%	685	705	746	766.47	770.38	773.74	814.74
SDLP	Louis Boyle	8.32%	488	488	601	601	601.17	601.17	
Alliance	David Griffin	6.97%	409	422					
TUV	Lyle Rea	4.25%	249						
Electorate: 10,290 Valid: 5,865 (57.00%) Spoilt: 59 Quota: 978 Turnout: 5,924 (57.57%)

== 2008 By-Election ==
Dromore by-election 13 February 2008
Party	Candidate	FPv%	Count				
Party	Candidate	FPv%	1	2	3	4	5
UUP	Carol Black	24.2	912	937	1,119	1,194	1,571
DUP	Paul Stewart	28.3	1,069	1,074	1,127	1,178	1,505
TUV	Keith Harbinson	19.6	739	742	801	828	
Sinn Féin	Paul Gribben	9.3	350	507	567		
Alliance	David Griffin	9.5	357	479			
SDLP	Paul Gribben	7.7	290				
Green (NI)	Helen Corry	1.6	59				
Valid: 3,776 Spoilt: 17 Quota: 1,889 Turnout: 3,793

== 2005 Election ==
2001: 2 x DUP, 2 x UUP, 1 x SDLP

2005: 3 x DUP, 1 x UUP, 1 x SDLP

2001-2005 Change: DUP gain from UUP

Dromore - 5 seats
Party	Candidate	FPv%	Count			
Party	Candidate	FPv%	1	2	3	4
UUP	Tyrone Howe	21.64%	1,304			
DUP	Norah Beare*	21.44%	1,292			
SDLP	Cassie McDermott*	11.82%	712	725.11	1,054.11	
DUP	David Herron*	13.91%	838	858.24	862.24	1,055.84
DUP	Paul Rankin*	14.44%	870	897.14	897.6	976.8
UUP	William Martin*	9.63%	580	814.6	834.83	843.85
Sinn Féin	Francis Branniff	7.12%	429	429.92		
Electorate: 9,542 Valid: 6,025 (63.14%) Spoilt: 94 Quota: 1,005 Turnout: 6,119 (64.13%)

== 2001 Election ==
1997: 3 x UUP, 1 x DUP, 1 x SDLP

2001: 2 x UUP, 2 x DUP, 1 x SDLP

1997-2001 Change: DUP gain from UUP

Dromore - 5 seats
Party	Candidate	FPv%	Count		
Party	Candidate	FPv%	1	2	3
DUP	Paul Rankin	22.43%	1,375		
SDLP	Cassie McDermott*	19.61%	1,202		
DUP	David Herron*	16.84%	1,032		
UUP	William Martin*	14.59%	894	905	1,033.7
UUP	Norah Beare	14.62%	896	910	1,020.22
UUP	Thompson Howe	11.18%	685	696	806.22
NI Unionist	Joseph McIlwaine	0.73%	45		
Electorate: 9,149 Valid: 6,129 (66.99%) Spoilt: 103 Quota: 1,022 Turnout: 6,232 (68.12%)

== 1997 Election ==
1993: 3 x UUP, 1 x DUP, 1 x SDLP

1997: 3 x UUP, 1 x DUP, 1 x SDLP

1993-1997 Change: No change

Dromore - 5 seats
Party	Candidate	FPv%	Count			
Party	Candidate	FPv%	1	2	3	4
UUP	William McCracken*	28.77%	1,358			
UUP	Thomas Gribben	14.13%	667	919.84		
UUP	William Martin*	15.02%	709	876.16		
DUP	David Herron*	16.31%	770	836.36		
SDLP	Cassie McDermott*	15.44%	729	732.78	735.98	816.98
Ind. Unionist	Robert Hill	6.06%	286	349	467.8	539.36
Alliance	Julian Crozier	4.28%	202	209.98	218.78	
Electorate: 8,457 Valid: 4,721 (55.82%) Spoilt: 66 Quota: 787 Turnout: 4,787 (56.60%)

== 1993 Election ==
1989: 4 x UUP, 1 x SDLP

1993: 3 x UUP, 1 x SDLP, 1 x DUP

1989-1993 Change: DUP gain from UUP

Dromore - 5 seats
Party	Candidate	FPv%	Count		
Party	Candidate	FPv%	1	2	3
UUP	Drew Nelson*	19.63%	980		
SDLP	Cassie McDermott*	19.05%	951		
DUP	David Herron	17.48%	873		
UUP	William Martin*	15.44%	771	794.4	854.85
UUP	William McCracken*	14.92%	745	826	845.53
UUP	Robert Hill*	13.48%	673	711.1	748.61
Electorate: 7,917 Valid: 4,993 (63.07%) Spoilt: 70 Quota: 833 Turnout: 5,063 (63.95%)

== 1989 Election ==
1985: 3 x UUP, 1 x DUP, 1 x SDLP

1989: 4 x UUP, 1 x SDLP

1985-1989 Change: UUP gain from DUP

Dromore - 5 seats
Party	Candidate	FPv%	Count					
Party	Candidate	FPv%	1	2	3	4	5	6
UUP	Drew Nelson	20.81%	1,109					
SDLP	Cassie McDermott*	18.31%	976					
UUP	William Martin*	15.87%	846	874.8	876	916.32		
UUP	Robert Hill*	14.39%	767	814	821.4	844.36	893.36	
UUP	William McCracken	10.68%	569	669.8	676	683.56	729.96	822.6
DUP	Robert McIlroy	8.37%	446	458.2	467.4	475.24	495.12	784.36
DUP	William Lough	6.14%	327	346.4	350.6	354.24	439.4	
Ulster Democratic	Colin Halliday	4.07%	217	224.4	268.8	271.32		
Ulster Democratic	Thomas Dickson	1.37%	73	74.6				
Electorate: 7,883 Valid: 5,330 (67.61%) Spoilt: 103 Quota: 889 Turnout: 5,433 (68.92%)

== 1985 Election ==
1985: 3 x UUP, 1 x DUP, 1 x SDLP

Dromore - 5 seats
Party	Candidate	FPv%	Count						
Party	Candidate	FPv%	1	2	3	4	5	6	7
DUP	Brian Biggerstaff*	18.79%	923						
UUP	Robert Barr	17.48%	859						
UUP	Robert Hill*	13.13%	645	662	684.66	833.66			
SDLP	Cassie McDermott	9.44%	464	465	466.1	473.1	474.15	474.15	904.15
UUP	William Martin	11.66%	573	580	582.42	760.28	787.73	800.45	809.45
DUP	Robert McIlroy	8.51%	418	575	640.78	660.99	668.34	669.9	670.9
SDLP	Bernard Rice	9.57%	470	471	471	471	471.2	471.2	
UUP	James McRoberts	7.21%	354	373	380.04				
DUP	Robert McGregor	4.21%	207						
Electorate: 7,240 Valid: 4,913 (67.86%) Spoilt: 116 Quota: 819 Turnout: 5,029 (69.46%)
