= 2023 Armagh City, Banbridge and Craigavon Borough Council election =

- 18 May 2023

All 41 council seats 21 seats needed for a majority
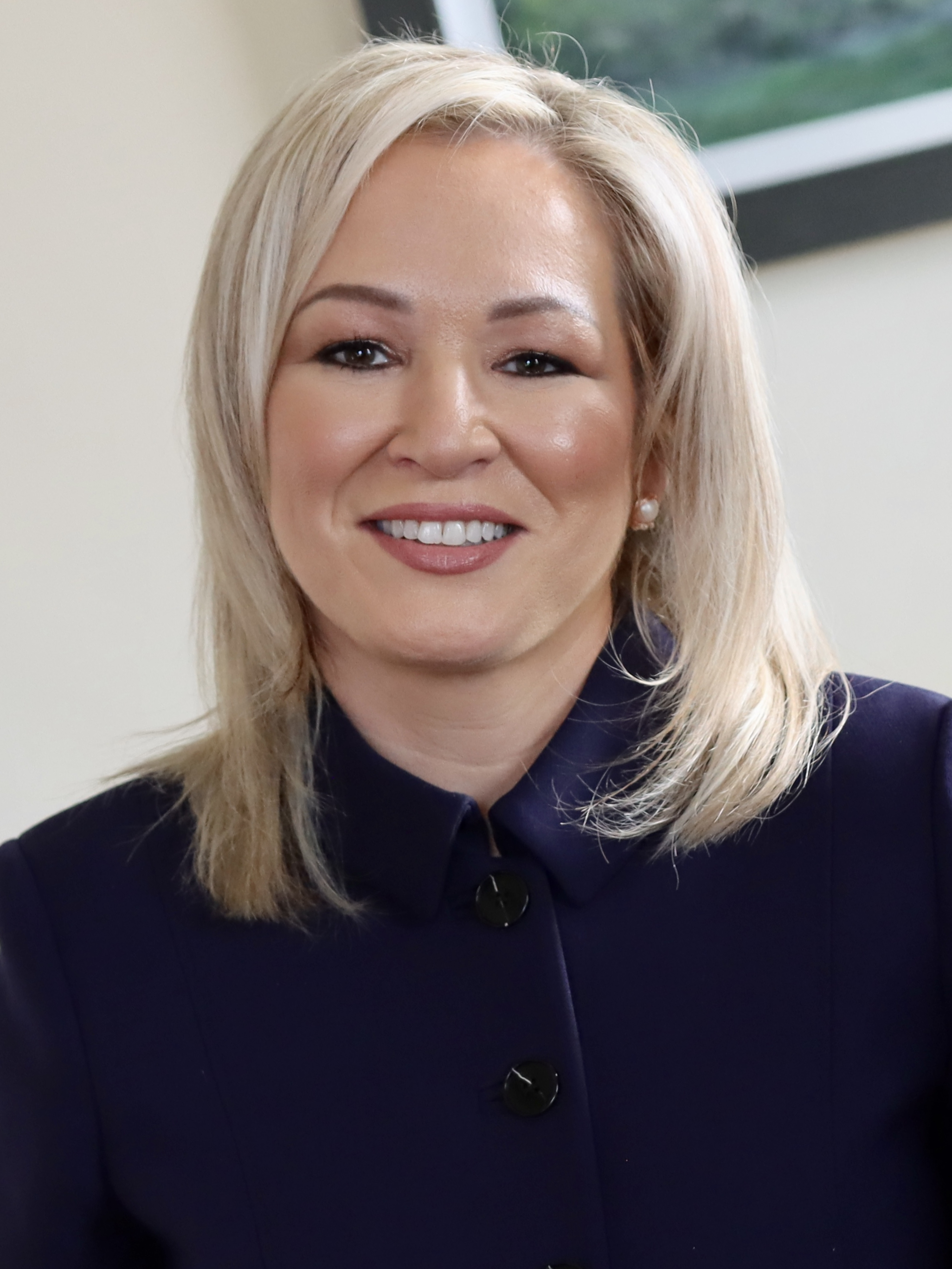

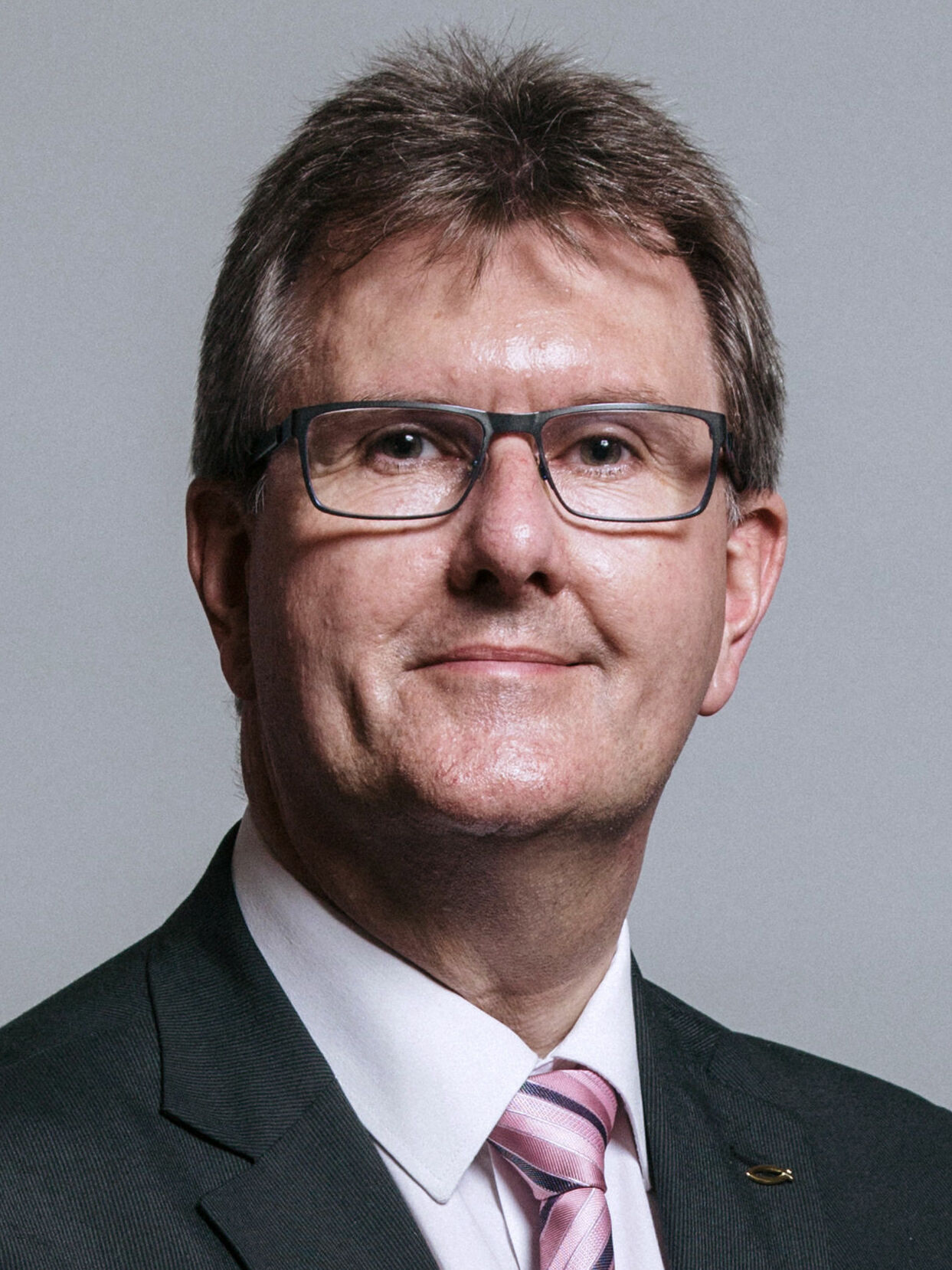

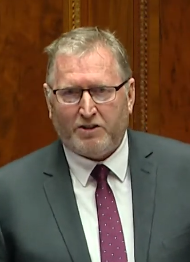

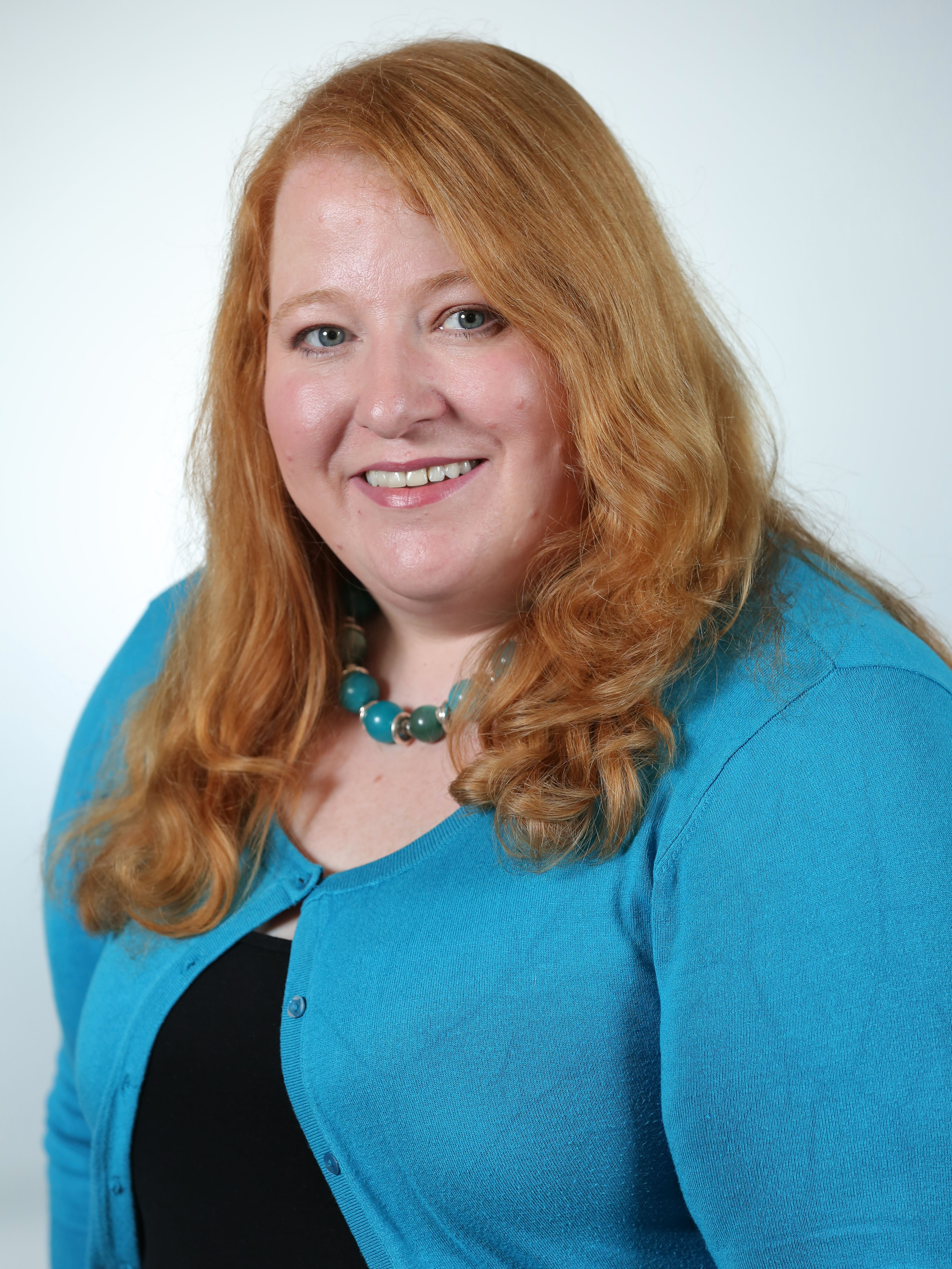

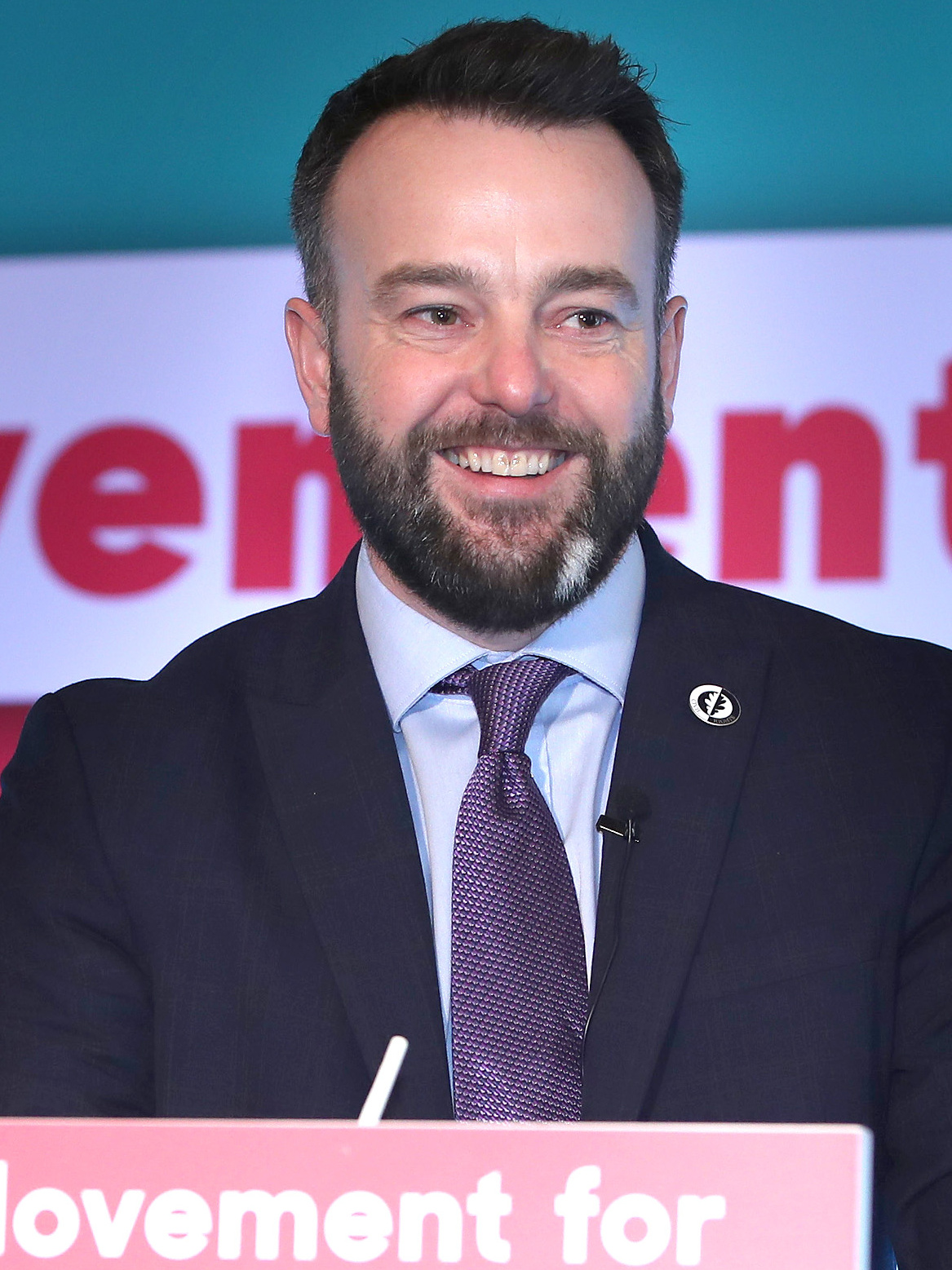

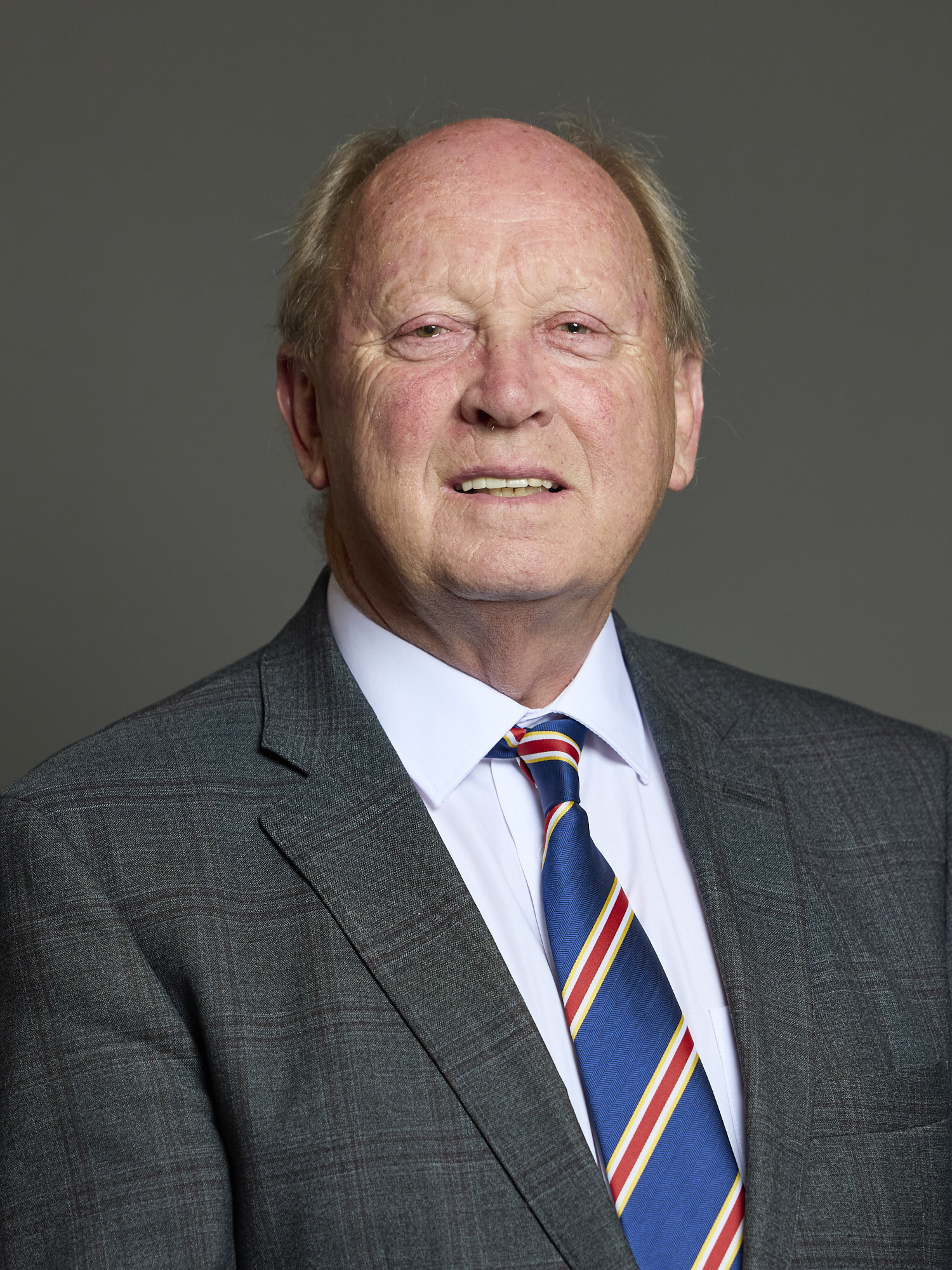
	First party	Second party	Third party
Leader	Michelle O'Neill (Note: The leader of Sinn Féin is Mary Lou McDonald, who sits as a TD in the Irish Dáil Éireann for Dublin Central. O'Neill is the leader of the party in Northern Ireland.)	Jeffrey Donaldson	Doug Beattie
Party	Sinn Féin	DUP	UUP
Last election	10	11	10
Seats won	15	13	6
Seat change	▲5	▲2	▼4
Popular vote	26,355	24,672	12,883
Percentage	30.47%	28.52%	14.89%
Swing	▲8.4%	▲0.7%	▼6.7%
	Fourth party	Fifth party	Sixth party
Leader	Naomi Long	Colum Eastwood	Jim Allister
Party	Alliance	SDLP	TUV
Last election	3	6	0
Seats won	4	1	1
Seat change	▲1	▼5	▲1
Popular vote	9,126	6,996	4,052
Percentage	10.55%	8.09%	4.68%
Swing	▲2.7%	▼5.4%	▲2.7%
	Seventh party
Party	Independent
Last election	1
Seats won	1
Seat change	Steady
Popular vote	2,059
Percentage	2.38%
Swing	▼1.2%
- Armagh City, Banbridge and Craigavon 2023 Council Election Results by DEA (Shaded by the plurality of FPVs)
Council control before election
No overall control
Council control after election
No overall control

The 2023 election to Armagh City, Banbridge and Craigavon Borough Council was held on 18 May 2023, alongside other local elections in Northern Ireland, two weeks after local elections in England. The Northern Ireland elections were delayed by two weeks to avoid overlapping with the coronation of King Charles III.

The 41 councillors were elected via single transferable vote.

== Election results ==
2023 Armagh City, Banbridge and Craigavon Borough Council election result
Party	Seats	Gains	Losses	Net gain/loss	Seats %	Votes %	Votes	+/−
Sinn Féin	15	5	0	▲5	36.59	30.47	26,355	▲8.52
DUP	13	2	0	▲2	31.70	28.52	24,672	▲0.57
UUP	6	0	4	▼4	14.63	14.89	12,883	▼6.71
Alliance	4	1	0	▲1	9.76	10.55	9,126	▲2.73
SDLP	1	0	5	▼5	2.44	8.09	6,996	▼5.36
TUV	1	1	0	▲1	2.44	4.68	4,052	▲2.69
Independent	1	0	0	0	2.44	2.38	2,059	▼1.15
Aontú	0	0	0	0	0.00	0.41	357	▼0.94
Total	41						86,500	

Note: "Votes" are the first preference votes.

== Districts summary ==
Results of the 2023 Armagh City, Banbridge and Craigavon Borough Council election by district
District Electoral Area (DEA)	%	Cllrs	%	Cllrs	%	Cllrs	%	Cllrs	%	Cllrs	%	Cllrs	%	Cllrs	Total cllrs
District Electoral Area (DEA)	Sinn Féin		DUP		UUP		Alliance		SDLP		TUV		Independents and others		Total cllrs
Armagh	49.59	4 ▲1	14.16	1 ▲1	9.78	0 ▼1	4.55	0	19.29	1 ▼1	0.00	0	2.63	0	6
Banbridge	24.47	2 ▲1	22.26	2	28.84	2 ▼1	14.34	1	5.76	0	4.34	0	0.00	0	7
Craigavon	35.90	2 ▲1	29.48	1	12.13	1	12.94	1 ▲1	8.90	0 ▼2	0.00	0	0.00	0	5
Cusher	17.73	1	26.81	1	12.55	1 ▼1	4.84	0	4.71	0	16.59	1 ▲1	16.77	1	5
Lagan River	5.02	0	49.03	3	19.86	1	17.62	1	2.20	0	6.27	0	0.00	0	5
Lurgan	48.59	4 ▲1	23.19	2 ▲1	7.84	0 ▼1	13.33	1	7.04	0 ▼1	0.00	0	0.00	0	7
Portadown	23.71	2 ▲1	41.58	3	13.74	1	7.55	0	6.90	0 ▼1	6.52	0	0.00	0	6
Total	30.47	15 ▲5	28.52	13 ▲2	14.89	6 ▼4	10.55	4 ▲1	8.09	1 ▼5	4.68	1 ▲1	5.10	1	41

== District results ==
=== Armagh ===
2019: 3 x Sinn Féin, 2 x SDLP, 1 x UUP

2023: 4 x Sinn Féin, 1 x SDLP, 1 x DUP

2019–2023 Change: Sinn Féin and DUP gain from SDLP and UUP

Armagh - 6 seats
Party	Candidate	FPv%	Count					
Party	Candidate	FPv%	1	2	3	4	5	6
Sinn Féin	Fergal Donnelly*	15.89%	2,158					
DUP	Scott Armstrong	14.16%	1,924	1,943				
SDLP	Thomas O'Hanlon*	12.18%	1,654	1,758	1,886	1,898.30	2,591.30	
Sinn Féin	Sarah Duffy	10.37%	1,409	1,442	1,498	1,663.90	1,864.70	2,091.70
Sinn Féin	Ashley Mallon	12.23%	1,661	1,694	1,716	1,729.60	1,782.20	1,848.20
Sinn Féin	John Óg O'Kane	11.10%	1,508	1,526	1,547	1,560.90	1,689.40	1,794.40
UUP	Sam Nicholson*	9.78%	1,328	1,329	1,442	1,442.20	1,504.20	1,572.20
SDLP	Gráinne O'Neill*	7.11%	966	1,006	1,263	1,271.80		
Alliance	Hanagh Winter	4.55%	619	638				
Aontú	Daniel Connolly	2.63%	357					
Electorate: 22,800 Valid: 13,584 (59.58%) Spoilt: 205 Quota: 1,941 Turnout: 13,789 (60.48%)

=== Banbridge ===
2019: 3 x UUP, 2 x DUP, 1 x Sinn Féin, 1 x Alliance

2023: 2 x UUP, 2 x Sinn Féin, 2 x DUP, 1 x Alliance

2019–2023 Change: Sinn Féin gain from UUP

Banbridge - 7 seats
Party	Candidate	FPv%	Count					
Party	Candidate	FPv%	1	2	3	4	5	6
Alliance	Joy Ferguson	14.34%	1,961					
UUP	Glenn Barr*	13.92%	1,903					
Sinn Féin	Chris McCartan	12.80%	1,750					
DUP	Paul Greenfield*	12.78%	1,747					
Sinn Féin	Kevin Savage*	11.67%	1,595	1,627.34	1,629.48	1,629.98	2,147.98	
DUP	Ian Wilson*	9.48%	1,296	1,301.46	1,684.74	1,702.04	1,713.04	
UUP	Ian Burns*	7.20%	984	1,029.64	1,143.06	1,262.96	1,344.76	1,433.76
UUP	Jill Macauley*	7.72%	1,055	1,090.28	1,154.28	1,201.28	1,258.96	1,317.96
SDLP	Seamus Doyle	5.76%	787	902.78	909.62	912.62		
TUV	Brian Moorhead	4.34%	593	596.78				
Electorate: 25,504 Valid: 13,671 (53.60%) Spoilt: 141 Quota: 1,709 Turnout: 13,812 (54.16%)

=== Craigavon ===
2019: 2 x SDLP, 1 x DUP, 1 x Sinn Féin, 1 x UUP

2023: 2 x Sinn Féin, 1 x DUP, 1 x Alliance, 1 x UUP

2019–2023 Change: Sinn Féin and Alliance gain from SDLP (two seats)

Craigavon - 5 seats
Party	Candidate	FPv%	Count				
Party	Candidate	FPv%	1	2	3	4	5
Sinn Féin	Jude Mallon	18.26%	1,964				
Sinn Féin	Catherine Nelson*	17.64%	1,897				
DUP	Margaret Tinsley*	16.84%	1,811				
Alliance	Robbie Alexander	12.94%	1,392	1,439	1,935		
UUP	Kate Evans ‡	12.13%	1,305	1,313	1,375	1,531.40	1,671.58
DUP	Ian Patterson	12.64%	1,360	1,361	1,379	1,393.28	1,395.00
SDLP	Declan McAlinden*	7.08%	762	889			
SDLP	Jackie Coade	1.82%	196				
Electorate: 20,449 Valid: 10,757 (52.60%) Spoilt: 172 Quota: 1,793 Turnout: 10,929 (53.45%)

=== Cusher ===
2019: 2 x UUP, 1 x DUP, 1 x Sinn Féin, 1 x Independent

2023: 1 x DUP, 1 x Sinn Féin, 1 x TUV, 1 x UUP, 1 x Independent

2019–2023 Change: TUV gain from UUP

Cusher - 5 seats
Party	Candidate	FPv%	Count			
Party	Candidate	FPv%	1	2	3	4
Sinn Féin	Bróna Haughey*	17.73%	2,177			
Independent	Paul Berry*	16.77%	2,059			
TUV	Keith Ratcliffe	16.59%	2,037	2,037.28	2,072.28	
DUP	Gareth Wilson* †	15.57%	1,912	1,912.07	1,941.07	1,963.49
UUP	Gordon Kennedy*	8.95%	1,099	1,099.84	1,432.91	1,832.93
DUP	Philip Weir	11.24%	1,380	1,380.14	1,402.14	1,432.61
SDLP	Emma Jayne McKernan	4.71%	578	685.03	688.03	
Alliance	Mark Skillen	4.84%	594	605.34	620.34	
UUP	Ewan McNeill	3.60%	442	442.07		
Electorate: 19,358 Valid: 12,278 (63.43%) Spoilt: 92 Quota: 2,047 Turnout: 12,370 (63.90%)

=== Lagan River ===
2019: 3 x DUP, 1 x UUP, 1 x Alliance

2023: 3 x DUP, 1 x UUP, 1 x Alliance

2019–2023 Change: No change

Lagan River - 5 seats
Party	Candidate	FPv%	Count					
Party	Candidate	FPv%	1	2	3	4	5	6
DUP	Mark Baxter*	22.61%	2,261					
Alliance	Jessica Johnston*	17.62%	1,762					
UUP	Kyle Savage*	13.93%	1,393	1,477.76	1,494.02	1,519.08	1,997.08	
DUP	Paul Rankin*	15.05%	1,505	1,594.44	1,597.70	1,602.18	1,677.18	
DUP	Tim McClelland*	11.37%	1,137	1,501.52	1,505.78	1,508.16	1,537.55	1,736.55
TUV	Samuel Morrison	6.27%	627	658.20	662.46	665.54	682.34	799.34
Sinn Féin	Vincent McAleenan	5.02%	502	502.26	647.78	677.39	685.38	694.38
UUP	Sammy Ogle	5.93%	593	603.66	624.66	653.85		
SDLP	Oisín Edwards	2.20%	220	222.34				
Electorate: 18,389 Valid: 10,000 (54.38%) Spoilt: 69 Quota: 1,667 Turnout: 10,069 (54.76%)

=== Lurgan ===
2019: 3 x Sinn Féin, 1 x DUP, 1 x SDLP, 1 x UUP, 1 x Alliance

2023: 4 x Sinn Féin, 2 x DUP, 1 x Alliance

2019–2023 Change: Sinn Féin gain from SDLP, DUP gain from UUP

Lurgan - 7 seats
Party	Candidate	FPv%	Count						
Party	Candidate	FPv%	1	2	3	4	5	6	7
Sinn Féin	Keith Haughian*	15.29%	2,153						
Alliance	Peter Lavery*	13.33%	1,877						
DUP	Peter Haire	13.13%	1,849						
Sinn Féin	Liam Mackle*	13.03%	1,835						
Sinn Féin	Sorchá McGeown* †	9.23%	1,299	1,615.44	1,632.90	1,633.26	1,666.34	2,048.34	
Sinn Féin	Mary O'Dowd	11.04%	1,554	1,586.04	1,591.92	1,591.92	1,625.20	1,926.20	
DUP	Stephen Moutray*	10.06%	1,416	1,416.36	1,419.30	1,479.26	1,479.38	1,492.08	1,497.08
UUP	Louise McKinstry*	7.84%	1,104	1,104.72	1,125.36	1,137.52	1,137.64	1,229.68	1,312.68
SDLP	Ciarán Toman*	7.04%	991	1,024.66	1,079.80	1,080.32	1,086.48		
Electorate: 26,807 Valid: 14,078 (52.52%) Spoilt: 221 Quota: 1,760 Turnout: 14,299 (53.34%)

=== Portadown ===
2019: 3 x DUP, 1 x Sinn Féin, 1 x UUP, 1 x SDLP

2023: 3 x DUP, 2 x Sinn Féin, 1 x UUP

2019–2023 Change: Sinn Féin gain from SDLP

Portadown - 6 seats
Party	Candidate	FPv%	Count								
Party	Candidate	FPv%	1	2	3	4	5	6	7	8	9
Sinn Féin	Paul Duffy*	16.28%	1,986								
DUP	Lavelle McIlwrath*	14.96%	1,826								
DUP	Kyle Moutray*	14.88%	1,816								
DUP	Alan Mulholland	11.74%	1,432	1,454	1,454.48	1,516.72	1,564.39	2,126.39			
UUP	Julie Flaherty*	11.10%	1,355	1,623	1,624.08	1,628.56	1,631.17	1,799.17			
Sinn Féin	Clare McConville-Walker	7.43%	907	907	1,107.28	1,107.32	1,107.35	1,108.47	1,109.47	1,492.06	1,493.06
Alliance	Emma Hutchinson	7.55%	921	931	942.76	943.00	943.30	958.01	1,021.01	1,437.03	1,470.03
SDLP	Eamon McNeill*	6.90%	842	844	861.88	862.44	862.59	867.99	903.99		
TUV	Robert Oliver	6.52%	795	806	806.36	811.24	814.63				
UUP	Zöe McCullough	2.64%	322								
Electorate: 22,318 Valid: 12,202 (54.67%) Spoilt: 214 Quota: 1,744 Turnout: 12,416 (55.63%)

== Changes during the term ==
=== † Co-options ===
Date co-opted	Electoral Area	Party	Outgoing	Co-optee	Reason
23 January 2026	Cusher	DUP	Gareth Wilson	Adam Copeland	Wilson was co-opted to the Northern Ireland Assembly.
1 June 2026	Lurgan	Sinn Féin	Sorchá McGeown	Chloe Devine	McGeown resigned.

=== ‡ Changes in affiliation ===
Date	Electoral Area	Name	Previous affiliation	New affiliation	Circumstance
25 May 2026	Craigavon	Kate Evans	UUP	Independent	Left the UUP.
