= Lagan River (District Electoral Area) =

District electoral area in Northern Ireland

- Armagh City, Banbridge and Craigavon Borough Council DEA constituency

Current constituency
- Created: 2014
- Seats: 5 (2014-)
- Councillors: Mark Baxter (DUP); Jessica Johnston (APNI); Tim McClelland (DUP); Paul Rankin (DUP); Kyle Savage (UUP)

Lagan River DEA within Armagh City, Banbridge and Craigavon

Lagan River is one of the seven district electoral areas (DEA) in Armagh City, Banbridge and Craigavon, Northern Ireland. The district elects five members to Armagh City, Banbridge and Craigavon Borough Council and contains the wards of Donaghcloney, Dromore, Gransha, Quilly and Waringstown. Lagan River forms part of the Upper Bann constituencies for the Northern Ireland Assembly and UK Parliament and part of the Lagan Valley constituencies for the Northern Ireland Assembly and UK Parliament.

It was created for the 2014 local elections, largely replacing the Dromore DEA which had existed since 1985, and parts of the Lurgan DEA.

== Councillors ==
Election	Councillor (Party)	Councillor (Party)	Councillor (Party)	Councillor (Party)	Councillor (Party)
2023	Jessica Johnston (Alliance)	Kyle Savage (UUP)	Tim McClelland (DUP)	Paul Rankin (DUP)	Mark Baxter (DUP)
May 2022 Co-Options	Jessica Johnston (Alliance)	Kyle Savage (UUP)	Tim McClelland (DUP)	Paul Rankin (DUP)	Mark Baxter (DUP)
February 2022 Co-Option	Eóin Tennyson (Alliance)	Kyle Savage (UUP)	Tim McClelland (DUP)	Keith Parke (DUP)	Mark Baxter (DUP)
2019	Eóin Tennyson (Alliance)	Kyle Savage (UUP)	Tim McClelland (DUP)	Paul Rankin (DUP)	Mark Baxter (DUP)
November 2015 Defection	Carol Black (UUP)/ (Independent)	Marc Woods (UUP)	Hazel Gamble (DUP)	Paul Rankin (DUP)	Mark Baxter (DUP)
2014	Carol Black (UUP)/ (Independent)	Marc Woods (UUP)	Hazel Gamble (DUP)	Paul Rankin (DUP)	Mark Baxter (DUP)

== 2023 Election ==
2019: 3 x DUP, 1 x UUP, 1 x Alliance

2023: 3 x DUP, 1 x UUP, 1 x Alliance

2019–2023 Change: No change

Lagan River - 5 seats
Party	Candidate	FPv%	Count					
Party	Candidate	FPv%	1	2	3	4	5	6
DUP	Mark Baxter*	22.61%	2,261					
Alliance	Jessica Johnston*	17.62%	1,762					
UUP	Kyle Savage*	13.93%	1,393	1,477.76	1,494.02	1,519.08	1,997.08	
DUP	Paul Rankin*	15.05%	1,505	1,594.44	1,597.70	1,602.18	1,677.18	
DUP	Tim McClelland*	11.37%	1,137	1,501.52	1,505.78	1,508.16	1,537.55	1,736.55
TUV	Samuel Morrison	6.27%	627	658.20	662.46	665.54	682.34	799.34
Sinn Féin	Vincent McAleenan	5.02%	502	502.26	647.78	677.39	685.38	694.38
UUP	Sammy Ogle	5.93%	593	603.66	624.66	653.85		
SDLP	Oisín Edwards	2.20%	220	222.34				
Electorate: 18,389 Valid: 10,000 (54.38%) Spoilt: 69 Quota: 1,667 Turnout: 10,069 (54.76%)

== 2019 Election ==
2014: 3 x DUP, 2 x UUP

2019: 3 x DUP, 1 x UUP, 1 x Alliance

2014-2019 Change: Alliance gain from UUP

Lagan River - 5 seats
Party	Candidate	FPv%	Count								
Party	Candidate	FPv%	1	2	3	4	5	6	7	8	9
DUP	Mark Baxter*	21.12%	1,876								
UUP	Kyle Savage	18.17%	1,614								
DUP	Paul Rankin* ††	16.25%	1,444	1,519.39							
Alliance	Eóin Tennyson †	10.81%	960	963.36	968	991.29	991.4	1,027.4	1,064.98	1,495.98	
DUP	Tim McClelland	7.63%	678	945.96	960.36	988.12	1,020.79	1,020.79	1,049.72	1,052.74	1,352.02
UUP	Olive Mercer	9.80%	871	981.37	987.29	1,010.09	1,013.83	1,014.25	1,102.37	1,141.06	1,311.62
TUV	Samuel Morrison	5.62%	499	511.39	517.55	542.58	543.13	543.13	581.51	588.51	
SDLP	John O'Hare	4.15%	369	369.42	370.3	372.38	372.38	548.38	559.46		
Independent	Sammy Ogle	2.44%	217	220.36	222.92	234	234.33	238.33			
Sinn Féin	Tony Gorrell	2.56%	227	227.84	227.84	228.84	228.84				
UKIP	Jordan Stewart	1.45%	129	133.2	134.88						
Electorate: 17,249 Valid: 8,884 (51.50%) Spoilt: 75 Quota: 1,481 Turnout: 8,959 (51.94%)

== 2014 Election ==
2014: 3 x DUP, 2 x UUP

Lagan River - 5 seats
Party	Candidate	FPv%	Count								
Party	Candidate	FPv%	1	2	3	4	5	6	7	8	9
DUP	Mark Baxter*	16.00%	1,341	1,352	1,353	1,369	1,373	1,484			
DUP	Paul Rankin*	15.13%	1,268	1,308	1,311	1,322	1,335	1,484			
UUP	Marc Woods	12.21%	1,023	1,032	1,032	1,054	1,059	1,229	1,235.72	1,249.8	1,483.8
UUP	Carol Black* ‡	10.08%	845	867	871	904	919	1,023	1,035.6	1,049.68	1,450.68
DUP	Hazel Gamble*	9.59%	804	819	820	832	836	915	980.52	1,031.72	1,226.04
Alliance	Harry Hamilton	6.23%	522	546	570	715	1,034	1,053	1,053.84	1,053.84	1,080.84
UUP	Olive Mercer*	9.12%	764	775	776	795	811	909	909.84	916.24	
TUV	Samuel Morrison	9.14%	766	777	778	789	792				
SDLP	Maureen Litter	3.77%	316	321	527	553					
NI21	Neville Hutchinson	3.42%	287	302	314						
Sinn Féin	Keara Downey	3.25%	272	273							
Independent	Frazer McCammond	2.06%	173								
Electorate: 16,260 Valid: 8,381 (51.54%) Spoilt: 92 Quota: 1,397 Turnout: 8,473 (52.11%)
