= Craigavon (District Electoral Area) =

District electoral area in Northern Ireland

- Armagh City, Banbridge and Craigavon Borough Council DEA constituency

Current constituency
- Created: 2014
- Seats: 5 (2014-)
- Councillors: Robbie Alexander (APNI); Kate Evans (IND); Jude Mallon (SF); Catherine Nelson (SF); Margaret Tinsley (DUP)

Craigavon DEA within Armagh City, Banbridge and Craigavon

Craigavon is one of the seven district electoral areas (DEA) in Armagh City, Banbridge and Craigavon, Northern Ireland. The district elects five members to Armagh City, Banbridge and Craigavon Borough Council and contains the wards of Bleary, Brownlow, Craigavon Centre, Derrytrasna and Kernan. Craigavon forms part of the Upper Bann constituencies for the Northern Ireland Assembly and UK Parliament.

It was created for the 2014 local elections, largely replacing the Craigavon Central DEA and parts of the Loughside DEA which had existed since 1985.

== Councillors ==
Election	Councillor (Party)	Councillor (Party)	Councillor (Party)	Councillor (Party)	Councillor (Party)
May 2026 Defection	Catherine Nelson (Sinn Féin)	Jude Mallon (Sinn Féin)	Robbie Alexander (Alliance)	Margaret Tinsley (DUP)	Kate Evans (Independent)/ (UUP)
2023	Catherine Nelson (Sinn Féin)	Jude Mallon (Sinn Féin)	Robbie Alexander (Alliance)	Margaret Tinsley (DUP)	Kate Evans (Independent)/ (UUP)
2019	Catherine Nelson (Sinn Féin)	Declan McAlinden (SDLP)	Thomas Larkham (SDLP)	Margaret Tinsley (DUP)	Kenneth Twyble (UUP)
February 2019 Defection	Fergal Lennon (Aontú)/ (Sinn Féin)	Declan McAlinden (SDLP)	Robert Smith (DUP)	Margaret Tinsley (DUP)	Kenneth Twyble (UUP)
2014	Fergal Lennon (Aontú)/ (Sinn Féin)	Declan McAlinden (SDLP)	Robert Smith (DUP)	Margaret Tinsley (DUP)	Kenneth Twyble (UUP)

== 2023 Election ==
2019: 2 x SDLP, 1 x DUP, 1 x Sinn Féin, 1 x UUP

2023: 2 x Sinn Féin, 1 x DUP, 1 x Alliance, 1 x UUP

2019–2023 Change: Sinn Féin and Alliance gain from SDLP (two seats)

Craigavon - 5 seats
Party	Candidate	FPv%	Count				
Party	Candidate	FPv%	1	2	3	4	5
Sinn Féin	Jude Mallon	18.26%	1,964				
Sinn Féin	Catherine Nelson*	17.64%	1,897				
DUP	Margaret Tinsley*	16.84%	1,811				
Alliance	Robbie Alexander	12.94%	1,392	1,439	1,935		
UUP	Kate Evans ‡	12.13%	1,305	1,313	1,375	1,531.40	1,671.58
DUP	Ian Patterson	12.64%	1,360	1,361	1,379	1,393.28	1,395.00
SDLP	Declan McAlinden*	7.08%	762	889			
SDLP	Jackie Coade	1.82%	196				
Electorate: 20,449 Valid: 10,757 (52.60%) Spoilt: 172 Quota: 1,793 Turnout: 10,929 (53.45%)

== 2019 Election ==
2014: 2 x DUP, 1 x SDLP, 1 x Sinn Féin, 1 x UUP

2019: 2 x SDLP, 1 x DUP, 1 x Sinn Féin, 1 x UUP

2014-2019 Change: SDLP gain from DUP

Craigavon - 5 seats
Party	Candidate	FPv%	Count						
Party	Candidate	FPv%	1	2	3	4	5	6	7
Sinn Féin	Catherine Nelson	13.77%	1,332	1,388	1,430	2,072			
SDLP	Thomas Larkham	12.86%	1,244	1,272	1,524	1,591	1,817		
UUP	Kenneth Twyble*	10.72%	1,037	1,037	1,135	1,136	1,139	1,141	1,803
SDLP	Declan McAlinden*	10.48%	1,014	1,083	1,191	1,218	1,324	1,470	1,544
DUP	Margaret Tinsley*	14.64%	1,416	1,416	1,427	1,427	1,428	1,428	1,506
DUP	Robert Smith*	11.42%	1,105	1,108	1,118	1,119	1,121	1,121	1,235
UUP	Kate Evans	9.00%	871	873	995	996	998	1,002	
Sinn Féin	Michael Tallon	7.51%	727	749	761				
Alliance	Sean Hagan	7.22%	699	725					
Aontú	Fergal Lennon*	2.38%	230						
Electorate: 18,798 Valid: 9,675 (51.47%) Spoilt: 176 Quota: 1,613 Turnout: 9,851 (52.40%)

== 2014 Election ==
2014: 2 x DUP, 1 x Sinn Féin, 1 x UUP, 1 x SDLP

Craigavon - 5 seats
Party	Candidate	FPv%	Count								
Party	Candidate	FPv%	1	2	3	4	5	6	7	8	9
UUP	Kenneth Twyble*	16.41%	1,389	1,389	1,451						
DUP	Robert Smith*	14.76%	1,250	1,250	1,265	1,430					
SDLP	Declan McAlinden*	9.93%	841	858	893	896	896.88	896.88	1,247.52	1,416.52	
Sinn Féin	Fergal Lennon ‡	10.75%	910	1,023	1,044	1,049	1,049.88	1,049.88	1,111.88	1,236.88	
DUP	Margaret Tinsley*	10.62%	899	899	912	964	967.52	981.6	983.6	999.71	1,303.71
Sinn Féin	Tommy O'Connor*	9.24%	782	837	844	844	844	844	881	991	995
UUP	Julie Flaherty	5.26%	445	445	476	633	659.4	661.71	667.47	694.58	
Independent	Kieran Corr	5.79%	490	494	542	545	546.76	546.98	596.98		
SDLP	Thomas Larkham	5.19%	439	451	537	539	544.28	544.28			
PUP	Brian Cummings	4.85%	411	411	424						
Alliance	John Cleland	4.69%	397	401							
Sinn Féin	Vincent McAleenan	2.52%	213								
Electorate: 17,589 Valid: 8,466 (48.13%) Spoilt: 174 Quota: 1,412 Turnout: 8,640 (49.12%)
