= Norah Beare =

Northern Ireland politician

Member of Banbridge District Council
- In office 7 June 2001 – 5 May 2011
- Preceded by: William McCracken
- Succeeded by: Olive Mercer
- Constituency: Dromore

Spokesperson for Health and Social Services
- In office 2003–2007

Member of the Northern Ireland Assembly for Lagan Valley
- In office 26 November 2003 – 7 March 2007
- Preceded by: Ivan Davis
- Succeeded by: Jonathan Craig

Personal details
- Born: 25 May 1946 (age 79) Banbridge, Northern Ireland
- Party: DUP (2004 – present); UUP (until 2004)
- Website: Beare DUP

Norah Beare (born 25 May 1946) is a former Northern Irish unionist politician who served as a Member of the Northern Ireland Assembly (MLA) for Lagan Valley from 2003 to 2007.

== Background ==
She was elected as an Ulster Unionist Party (UUP) candidate in the Assembly election of 2003; however, she defected to the Democratic Unionist Party (DUP) in 2004 along with Jeffrey Donaldson MP, MLA for Lagan Valley and Arlene Foster, MLA for Fermanagh and South Tyrone.

Norah Beare worked for forty years as a secretary in a number of different companies and then became in 1997 the Personal Assistant to Jeffrey Donaldson. Beare was elected to the Banbridge, County Down council in 2001 as a UUP candidate. On Donaldson's advice she was selected as the third UUP candidate for the November 2003 Northern Ireland Assembly elections.

In December 2003 she resigned, with Donaldson and Arlene Foster, from the UUP and subsequently joined the DUP in January 2004. In 2005 she was re-elected to the council as a DUP politician. In January 2007, Beare was not selected by the Lagan Valley DUP association to fight the next Northern Ireland Assembly elections due in early March 2007.

Beare was elected chairman of Banbridge District Council in 2008.

Northern Ireland Assembly
Preceded by Ivan Davis	MLA for Lagan Valley; 2003–2007	Succeeded by Jonathan Craig
