= Armagh City, Banbridge and Craigavon Borough Council =

Local authority in Northern Ireland

Type
- Type: District council of Armagh, Banbridge and Craigavon

History
- Founded: 1 April 2015
- Preceded by: Armagh City and District Council; Banbridge District Council; Craigavon Borough Council

Leadership
- Lord Mayor: Mary O'Dowd, Sinn Féin
- Deputy Lord Mayor: Lavelle McIlwrath, Democratic Unionist Party

Structure
- Seats: 41
- Graph of the party split among 41 seats.
- Political groups: All parties (41) Sinn Féin (15) DUP (13) UUP (5) Alliance (4) SDLP (1) TUV (1) Independent (2)
- Length of term: 4 years

Elections
- Voting system: Single transferable vote
- Last election: 18 May 2023
- Next election: 6 May 2027

Meeting place
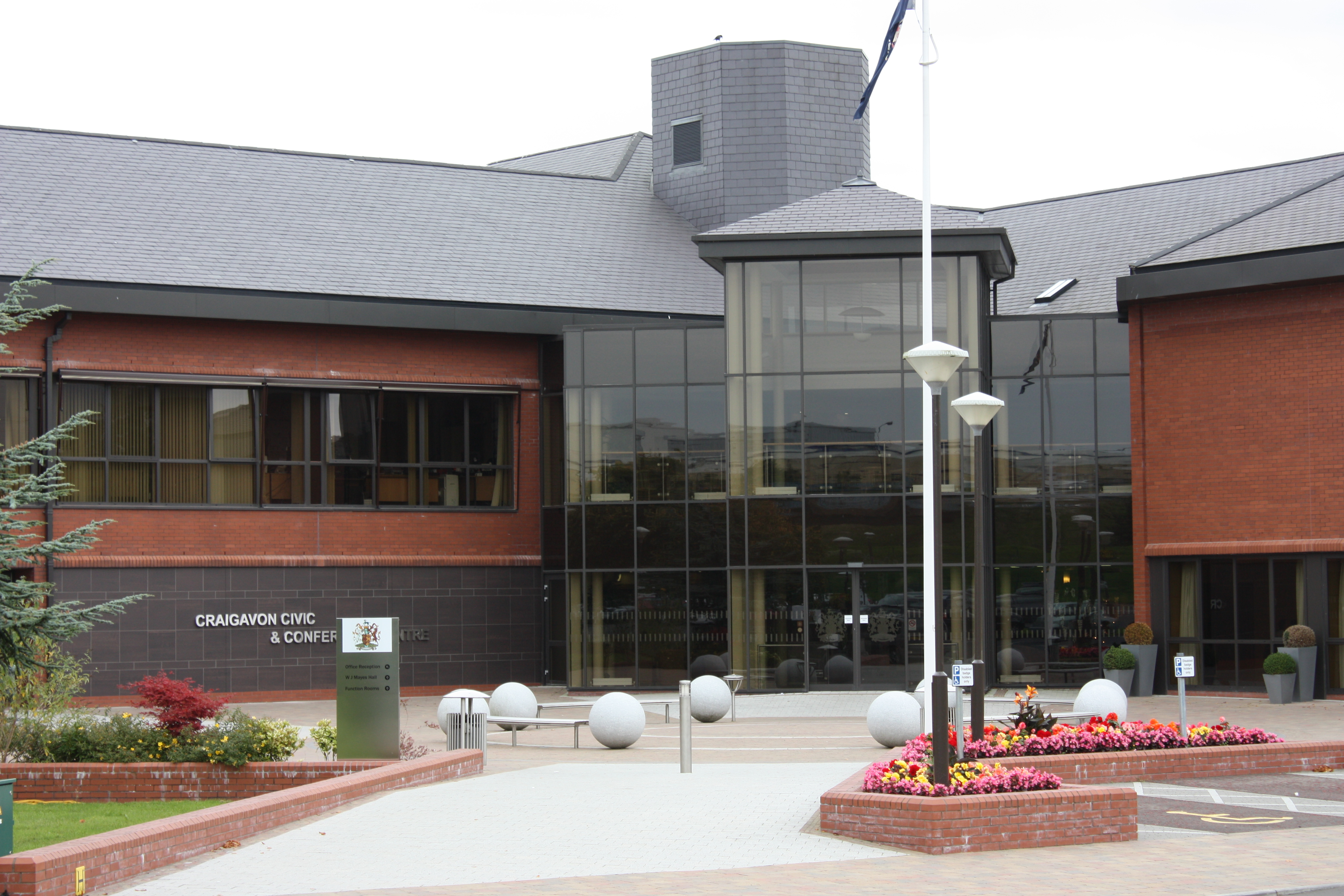
- Craigavon Civic and Conference Centre, Lakeview Road, Craigavon

Website
- www.armaghbanbridgecraigavon.gov.uk

Armagh City, Banbridge and Craigavon Borough Council is a local authority that was established on 1 April 2015. It replaced Armagh City and District Council, Banbridge District Council and Craigavon Borough Council. The first elections to the authority were on 22 May 2014 and it acted as a shadow authority, before the Armagh, Banbridge and Craigavon district was created on 1 April 2015.

== Mayoralty ==
=== Lord Mayor ===
From	To	Name	Party
2015	2016	Darryn Causby	DUP
2016	2017	Garath Keating	Sinn Féin
2017	2018	Gareth Wilson	DUP
2018	2019	Julie Flaherty	UUP
2019	2020	Mealla Campbell	SDLP
2020	2021	Kevin Savage	Sinn Féin
2021	2022	Glenn Barr	UUP
2022	2023	Paul Greenfield	DUP
2023	2024	Margaret Tinsley	DUP
2024	2025	Sarah Duffy	Sinn Féin
2025	2026	Stephen Moutray	DUP
2026	Present	Mary O'Dowd	Sinn Féin

=== Deputy Lord Mayor ===
From	To	Name	Party
2015	2016	Catherine Seeley	Sinn Féin
2016	2017	Paul Greenfield	DUP
2017	2018	Sam Nicholson	UUP
2018	2019	Paul Duffy	Sinn Féin
2019	2020	Margaret Tinsley	DUP
2020	2021	Kyle Savage	UUP
2021	2022	Jackie Donnelly	Sinn Féin
2022	2023	Tim McClelland	DUP
2023	2024	Sorchá McGeown	Sinn Féin
2024	2025	Kyle Savage	UUP
2025	2026	Jessica Johnston	Alliance
2026	Present	Lavelle McIlwrath	DUP

== Councillors ==
For the purpose of elections the council is divided into seven district electoral areas (DEA):

Area	Seats
Armagh	6
Banbridge	7
Craigavon	5
Cusher	5
Lagan River	5
Lurgan	7
Portadown	6

=== Seat summary ===
Party	Elected 2019	Elected 2023	Current
Sinn Féin	10	15	15
DUP	11	13	13
UUP	10	6	5
Alliance	3	4	4
SDLP	6	1	1
TUV	0	1	1
Independents	1	1	2

=== Councillors by electoral area ===
Borders of the DEAs within Armagh City, Banbridge and Craigavon

For further details see 2023 Armagh City, Banbridge and Craigavon Borough Council election.

Current council members
District electoral area	Name	Party
Armagh	Fergal Donnelly	Sinn Féin
Armagh	Scott Armstrong	DUP
Armagh	Thomas O'Hanlon	SDLP
Armagh	Sarah Duffy	Sinn Féin
Armagh	Ashley Mallon	Sinn Féin
Armagh	John Óg O'Kane	Sinn Féin
Banbridge	Joy Ferguson	Alliance
Banbridge	Glenn Barr	UUP
Banbridge	Chris McCartan	Sinn Féin
Banbridge	Paul Greenfield	DUP
Banbridge	Ian Wilson	DUP
Banbridge	Kevin Savage	Sinn Féin
Banbridge	Ian Burns	UUP
Craigavon	Jude Mallon	Sinn Féin
Craigavon	Catherine Nelson	Sinn Féin
Craigavon	Margaret Tinsley	DUP
Craigavon	Robbie Alexander	Alliance
Craigavon	Kate Evans ‡	Independent
Cusher	Bróna Haughey	Sinn Féin
Cusher	Paul Berry	Independent
Cusher	Keith Ratcliffe	TUV
Cusher	Adam Copeland †	DUP
Cusher	Gordon Kennedy	UUP
Lagan River	Mark Baxter	DUP
Lagan River	Jessica Johnston	Alliance
Lagan River	Kyle Savage	UUP
Lagan River	Paul Rankin	DUP
Lagan River	Tim McClelland	DUP
Lurgan	Keith Haughian	Sinn Féin
Lurgan	Peter Lavery	Alliance
Lurgan	Peter Haire	DUP
Lurgan	Liam Mackle	Sinn Féin
Lurgan	Chloe Devine †	Sinn Féin
Lurgan	Mary O'Dowd	Sinn Féin
Lurgan	Stephen Moutray	DUP
Portadown	Paul Duffy	Sinn Féin
Portadown	Lavelle McIlwrath	DUP
Portadown	Kyle Moutray	DUP
Portadown	Julie Flaherty	UUP
Portadown	Alan Mulholland	DUP
Portadown	Clare McConville-Walker	Sinn Féin

== Population ==
The area covered by the council has a population of 218,656 residents according to the 2021 Northern Ireland census. This made it the second largest council, in terms of population, after Belfast City Council.

== Freedom of the Borough ==
The following people and military units have received the Freedom of the Borough of Armagh City, Banbridge and Craigavon Borough.

=== Individuals ===
- Ronnie McFall: 13 May 2017
- Rory Best: 10 September 2018
- Gloria Hunniford: 20 December 2021.
