= Banbridge District Council =

Former local authority of Banbridge in Northern Ireland

Type
- Type: District Council of Banbridge (district)

Banbridge District Council was the local authority of Banbridge in Northern Ireland. It was created in 1973 when the Local Government (Boundaries) Act (Northern Ireland) 1971 came into force. In May 2015, it merged with Armagh City and District Council and Craigavon Borough Council to form one of 11 new local government units. The new council area was named Armagh, Banbridge and Craigavon District Council.

== District council ==
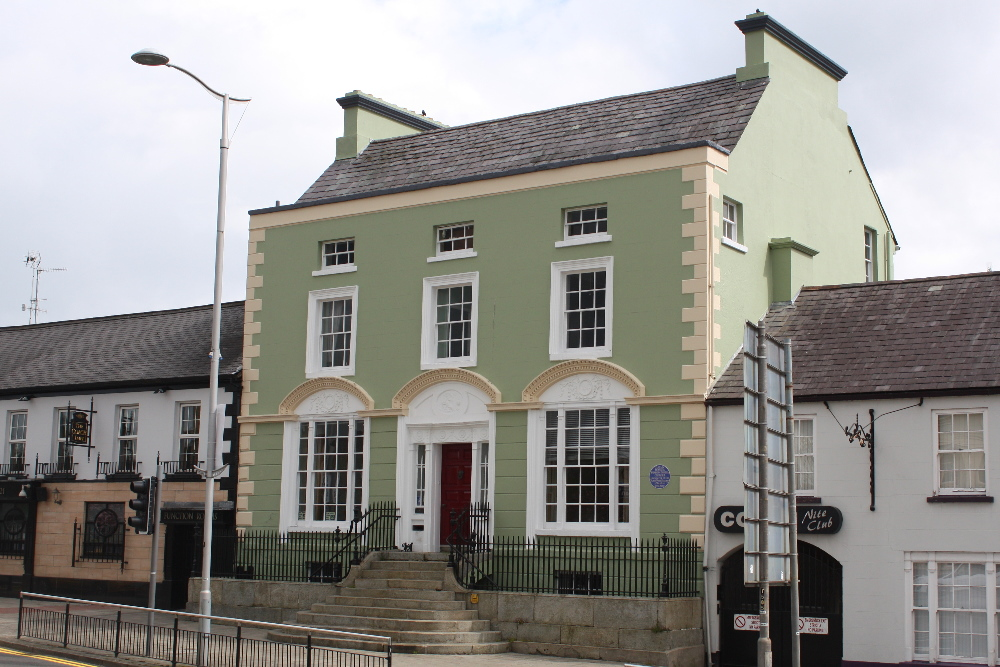
Avonmore House, the former offices of Banbridge District Council

The district was divided into three electoral areas: Banbridge, Knockiveagh and Dromore, which between them returned 17 members. Elections of the whole council were usually held every four years and were conducted under the proportional representation single transferable vote system. Notably, Banbridge District Council was the only council controlled by one party (the UUP) from its creation in 1973 until the year 2000 when the DUP gained a seat in a by-election in Dromore. Following the May 2011 local-government elections, the UUP retook its position from the DUP as the largest party on the council, winning seven of the 17 seats available. This was one of the few gains made by the UUP in either the local or Assembly elections of that year. Six of the 17 councillors elected in 2011 were women. At 56 per cent, turnout in the 2011 elections was the lowest it had been since Banbridge Council was formed in 1973.

In the civic year 2011–2012 UUP councillors Joan Baird and Carol Black served as the head and deputy head of the council. This was the first time in the history of Banbridge Council that the positions of chairman and vice-chairman had been held by women.

=== District Electoral Areas ===
==== 1972/3 ====
When it was created, the council was divided into the following District Electoral Areas under the Local Government (District Electoral Areas) Regulations (Northern Ireland) 1973: -

1. A - 7 seats - wards of Gilford, Edenderry, Lawrencetown, Central, Loughbrickland, Ballydown and Seapatrick.

2. B - 8 seats - wards of Annaclone, Balloolymore, Drumadonnell, Quilly, Garran, Skeagh, Croob and Dromore.

The names and boundaries of those wards (mainly made up of townlands) had been set by the Local Government (Boundaries) Order (Northern Ireland) 1972 (page 593).

==== 1984/5 ====
Prior to the 1985 local election, the council was divided into the following DEAs under the District Electoral Areas (Northern Ireland) Order 1985 (page 359)

1. Banbridge Town - 5 seats - wards of Ballydown, Banbridge West, Edenderry, Fort and Seapatrick.

2. Dromore - 5 seats - wards of Croob, Dromore North, Dromore South, Garran and Quilly.

3. Knockiveagh - 5 seats - wards of Bannside, Gilford, Katesbridge, Lawrencetown and Loughbrickland.

The names of those wards had been set by the Local Government (Boundaries) Order (Northern Ireland) 1984 (page 885). Their boundaries were shown on maps deposited at the office of the Department of the Environment.

==== 1992/3 ====
Map of the district's DEAs from 1993 to 2014

Prior to the 1993 local election, the council was divided into the following DEAs under the District Electoral Areas (Northern Ireland) Order 1993: -

1. Banbridge Town - 6 seats - wards of Ballydown, Banbridge West, Edenderry, Fort, Seapatrick and The Cut.

2. Dromore - 5 seats - wards of Ballyward, Dromore North, Dromore South, Gransha and Quilly.

3. Knockiveagh - 6 seats - wards of Bannside, Gilford, Katesbridge, Lawrencetown, Loughbrickland and Rathfriland.

The names of those wards had been set by the Local Government (Boundaries) Order (Northern Ireland) 1992. Their boundaries were shown on maps deposited at the office of the Department of the Environment.

=== Election results ===
Elections of the entire council were held every four years. The number of seats won by each party is shown below. An election was due in 2009, but this was delayed until 2011 so as to accommodate the completion of a local-government reform programme aimed at reducing the number of council areas from 26 to 11. The proposed amalgamation was abandoned in 2010, and so the 2011 elections returned members for the original 26 councils.

Party	1973	1977	1981	1985	1989	1993	1997	2001	2005	2011
UUP	8	8	8	8	9	10	9	7	5	7
DUP	0	3	4	3	2	2	3	5	6	5
SDLP	1	2	2	3	3	3	3	3	3	2
SF	0	0	0	0	0	0	0	0	0	2
Alliance	0	0	0	0	0	1	0	1	1	1
Other Unionist	3	1	0	0	0	0	0	0	1	0
Independent	3	1	1	1	1	1	2	1	1	0
Total seats	15	15	15	15	15	17	17	17	17	17
Female councillors	-	-	-	-	-	-	-	3	7	6
Turnout (incl. spoilt ballots)	71.34	63.62	72.43	67.17	65.78	62.05	57.57	69.60	63.45	56.42

==== Dromore by-election, 2008 ====
In late 2007 UUP Councillor Tyrone Howe resigned due to work commitments. The resulting by election was the first electoral test for Traditional Unionist Voice. Against expectations, the UUP held the seat.

Dromore by-election 13 February 2008
Party	Candidate	FPv%	Count				
Party	Candidate	FPv%	1	2	3	4	5
UUP	Carol Black	24.2	912	937	1,119	1,194	1,571
DUP	Paul Stewart	28.3	1,069	1,074	1,127	1,178	1,505
TUV	Keith Harbinson	19.6	739	742	801	828	
Sinn Féin	Paul Gribben	9.3	350	507	567		
Alliance	David Griffin	9.5	357	479			
SDLP	Paul Gribben	7.7	290				
Green (NI)	Helen Corry	1.6	59				
Valid: 3,776 Spoilt: 17 Quota: 1,889 Turnout: 3,793
