= 1977 Banbridge District Council election =

Local govt election in Northern Ireland

← 1973	18 May 1977	1981 →

All 15 seats to Banbridge District Council 8 seats needed for a majority
	First party	Second party	Third party
Party	UUP	DUP	SDLP
Seats won	8	3	2
Seat change	▼3	▲3	▲1
	Fourth party	Fifth party
Party	Ind. Unionist	Ind. Nationalist
Seats won	1	1
Seat change	0	▼1

Elections to Banbridge District Council were held on 18 May 1977 on the same day as the other Northern Irish local government elections. The election used two district electoral areas to elect a total of 15 councillors.

== Election results ==
Banbridge District Council Election Result 1977
Party	Seats	Gains	Losses	Net gain/loss	Seats %	Votes %	Votes	+/−
UUP	8	0	3	▼3	53.3	47.0	5,850	▼18.0
DUP	3	3	0	▲3	20.0	17.3	2,155	New
SDLP	2	1	0	▲1	13.3	15.0	1,864	▲7.0
Ind. Unionist	1	0	0	0	6.7	4.7	584	▲2.8
Ind. Nationalist	1	0	1	▼1	6.7	6.0	742	▼3.1
Alliance	0	0	0	0	0.0	6.2	774	▼0.5
UUUP	0	0	0	0	0.0	3.7	465	New
Independent	0	0	1	▼1	0.0	1.7	215	▼11.9

Note: "Votes" are the first preference votes.

== Districts summary ==
Results of the Banbridge District Council election, 1977 by district
Ward	%	Cllrs	%	Cllrs	%	Cllrs	%	Cllrs	Total Cllrs
Ward	UUP		DUP		SDLP		Others		Total Cllrs
Area A	36.2	3	17.8	2	12.2	1	33.8	2	7
Area B	57.9	5	16.8	2	17.8	1	7.5	0	8
Total	47.0	8	17.3	3	15.0	2	20.7	2	15

== Districts results ==
=== Area A ===
1973: 4 x UUP, 2 x Independent Nationalist, 1 x Independent Unionist
1977: 3 x UUP, 1 x DUP, 1 x SDLP, 1 x Independent Nationalist, 1 x Independent Unionist
1973-1977 Change: DUP and SDLP gain from UUP and Independent Nationalist

Banbridge Area A - 7 seats
Party	Candidate	FPv%	Count									
Party	Candidate	FPv%	1	2	3	4	5	6	7	8	9	10
SDLP	James Walsh	12.18%	758	759	780							
UUP	Wilson Davidson*	11.20%	697	726	727	727	748	819				
Ind. Nationalist	Laurence McCartan*	8.47%	527	529	555	555.7	555.7	555.7	778.3			
UUP	Samuel Cowan*	8.00%	498	503	503	503	513	575	576	782		
Ind. Unionist	Hugh Anderson*	6.73%	419	485	487	487.1	493.1	506.1	510.1	539.1	542.82	782.82
DUP	James McElroy	10.17%	633	640	640	640	733	737	739	768	769.24	779.24
UUP	Norman Ferguson	7.99%	497	516	516	516	519	575	576	635	668.48	764.48
DUP	Frederick Baxter	7.65%	476	479	479	479	546	556	556	569	570.86	575.86
Alliance	John McWhirter	6.12%	381	396	488	488.3	489.3	489.4	499.4	504.4	505.02	
UUP	William McCullagh*	5.63%	350	352	352	352	359	363	365			
Ind. Nationalist	Daniel Lennon*	3.46%	215	218	250	250.8	251.8	251.8				
UUP	John Anderson	3.42%	213	221	221	221.1	223.1					
UUUP	John Porter	3.52%	219	221	221	221						
Alliance	Peter Finnegan	2.80%	174	176								
Ind. Unionist	James Crozier*	2.65%	165									
Electorate: 10,687 Valid: 6,222 (58.22%) Spoilt: 262 Quota: 778 Turnout: 6,484 (60.67%)

=== Area B ===
1973: 7 x UUP, 1 x SDLP
1977: 5 x UUP, 2 x DUP, 1 x SDLP
1973-1977 Change: DUP (two seats) gain from UUP (two seats)

Banbridge Area B - 8 seats
Party	Candidate	FPv%	Count								
Party	Candidate	FPv%	1	2	3	4	5	6	7	8	9
UUP	Matthew Bailey*	12.96%	805								
SDLP	Patrick McAvoy*	10.91%	678	678.14	734.14						
UUP	Raymond McCullough*	10.19%	678	688.36	695.36						
DUP	David Herron	10.11%	628	640.32	642.32	740.32					
UUP	Herbert Heslip*	7.60%	472	480.26	498.4	517.54	519.62	519.62	805.62		
UUP	Robert Barr	6.04%	375	427.5	456.78	474.48	475	475	507.26	591.31	629.47
DUP	Brian Biggerstaff	6.73%	418	422.9	423.9	493.32	537	537	553.08	558.41	566.13
UUP	Robert Hill*	6.91%	429	430.82	455.96	475.24	476.8	477.61	524.78	540.36	551.94
UUP	George Gamble	7.36%	457	461.76	481.76	491.04	491.56	492.42	512.26	520.87	545.89
SDLP	Michael O'Hare	6.89%	428	428.42	447.56	448.56	448.56	487.26	491.26	491.26	
UUP	Eric Williamson*	6.10%	379	390.06	407.2	415.62	416.17	418.72			
UUUP	John McKinstry	3.96%	246	248.1	250.24						
Alliance	Edward Gibney	3.53%	219	219.98							
Electorate: 9,844 Valid: 6,212 (63.10%) Spoilt: 245 Quota: 691 Turnout: 6,457 (65.59%)
