= 1973 Banbridge District Council election =

Local govt election in Northern Ireland

30 May 1973	1977 →

All 15 seats to Banbridge District Council 8 seats needed for a majority
	First party	Second party	Third party
Party	UUP	Ind. Nationalist	SDLP
Seats won	11	2	1
	Fourth party
Party	Ind. Unionist
Seats won	1

Elections to Banbridge District Council were held on 30 May 1973 on the same day as the other Northern Irish local government elections. The election used two district electoral areas to elect a total of 15 councillors.

== Election results ==
Party	Seats	±	First Pref. votes	FPv%	±%
UUP	11		9,622	65.0	
Ind. Nationalist	2		1,353	9.1	
SDLP	1		1,183	8.0	
Ind. Unionist	1		283	1.9	
Independent	0		1,336	9.0	
Alliance	0		850	5.7	
NI Labour	0		170	1.1	
Totals	15		14,797	100.0	—

== Districts summary ==
Results of the Banbridge District Council election, 1973 by district
Ward	%	Cllrs	%	Cllrs	%	Cllrs	Total Cllrs
Ward	UUP		SDLP		Others		Total Cllrs
Area A	57.3	4	0.0	0	42.7	3	7
Area B	72.2	7	15.4	1	12.4	0	8
Total	65.0	11	8.0	1	27.0	3	15

== Districts results ==
=== Area A ===
1973: 4 x UUP, 2 x Independent Nationalist, 1 x Independent Unionist

Banbridge Area A - 7 seats
Party	Candidate	FPv%	Count													
Party	Candidate	FPv%	1	2	3	4	5	6	7	8	9	10	11	12	13	14
UUP	Wilson Davidson	15.80%	1,125													
UUP	James Crozier	14.93%	1,063													
UUP	Samuel Cowan	10.90%	776	830.2	871.16	877.12	879.96	891.76								
Ind. Nationalist	Laurence McCartan	9.45%	673	673.2	673.2	675.2	678.2	680.2	707.2	852.2	865.4	866.4	919.4			
UUP	William McCullagh	10.03%	714	733.4	743.16	744.72	746.72	748.04	752.52	752.52	756.88	857.6	857.76	873.64	1,109.64	
Ind. Nationalist	Daniel Lennon	9.55%	680	680	680	682.16	683.16	685.16	701.16	749.16	765.16	765.16	822.16	859.16	863.32	863.32
Ind. Unionist	Hugh Anderson	3.97%	283	301.8	319.08	323.6	328.28	348.68	366.12	366.12	405.2	431.4	434.72	552.4	661.24	707.24
Alliance	A. L. Cowdy	3.61%	257	258.8	262.16	262.32	306.32	323.04	338.2	338.2	356.16	358.68	512.68	554.68	571.12	580.12
UUP	R. W. Jardine	3.48%	248	289	331.56	336.52	342.32	358.76	369.6	369.6	376.48	477.16	479.68	514.6		
Independent	R. G. Quail	2.01%	143	146.6	152.2	175.28	179.6	214.68	256.56	256.56	317.4	336.56	351.88			
Alliance	Peter Finnegan	3.09%	220	220.2	221	222	247	251.16	267.64	276.64	296.64	296.64				
UUP	R. Wilson	2.16%	154	219	240.28	242.88	245.24	247.56	252.6	252.6	262					
NI Labour	J. Hearthwood	2.39%	170	175.2	180	185.48	196.8	206.08	226.68	228.68						
Independent	D. Toman	2.77%	197	197	197	197	198	198	204							
Independent	P. Reavey	1.98%	141	142.6	149.64	151.8	164.6	175.28								
Independent	W. Cross	1.36%	97	101.2	104.72	129.12	132.48									
Alliance	J. H. Rea	1.50%	107	107.6	111.92	118.8										
Independent	J. Hozack	1.03%	73	81.2	87.92											
Electorate: 10,205 Valid: 7,121 (69.78%) Spoilt: 91 Quota: 891 Turnout: 7,212 (70.67%)

=== Area B ===
1973: 7 x UUP, 1 x SDLP

Banbridge Area B - 8 seats
Party	Candidate	FPv%	Count										
Party	Candidate	FPv%	1	2	3	4	5	6	7	8	9	10	11
UUP	Matthew Bailey	15.89%	1,220										
UUP	Raymond McCullough	11.28%	866										
UUP	J. Gibson	10.64%	817	917.5									
UUP	Herbert Heslip	10.88%	835	876.7									
UUP	Eric Williamson	7.76%	596	767.6	783.8	794.96	796.34	798.64	815.24	821.74	904.74		
UUP	J. McClughan	8.48%	651	662.7	672.3	674.82	676.82	677.82	701.42	701.72	740.16	927.16	
UUP	Robert Hill	7.26%	557	570.5	600.9	608.46	609.64	610.64	623.44	624.15	680.9	775.3	845.86
SDLP	Patrick McAvoy	7.82%	600	600.3	600.3	600.3	605.3	707.3	742.3	742.3	701.3	772.31	774.2
SDLP	Michael O'Hare	7.60%	583	583.6	583.6	583.6	602.6	649.6	671.9	671.9	679.1	706.1	706.73
Independent	J. McGrehan	3.62%	278	281	282.6	282.78	286.78	292.78	327.78	327.81	397.02		
Independent	J. S. Higginson	3.11%	239	247.7	251.3	252.92	254.22	262.42	321.72	322.36			
Alliance	Edward Gibney	1.85%	142	147.7	148.5	148.5	235.5	257.5					
Independent	P. B. Hillen	2.19%	168	168.6	168.8	168.8	169.8						
Alliance	G. B. H. Smyth	0.85%	65	65	65.2	65.2							
Alliance	Ebezener Mulligan	0.77%	59	59.3	59.3	59.84							
Electorate: 10,784 Valid: 7,676 (71.18%) Spoilt: 85 Quota: 853 Turnout: 7,761 (71.97%)
