= 1981 Banbridge District Council election =

Local govt election in Northern Ireland

← 1977	20 May 1981	1985 →

All 15 seats to Banbridge District Council 8 seats needed for a majority
	First party	Second party	Third party
Party	UUP	DUP	SDLP
Seats won	8	4	2
Seat change	0	▲1	0
	Fourth party	Fifth party
Party	Ind. Nationalist	Ind. Unionist
Seats won	1	0
Seat change	0	▼1

Elections to Banbridge District Council were held on 20 May 1981 on the same day as the other Northern Irish local government elections. The election used two district electoral areas to elect a total of 15 councillors.

== Election results ==
Banbridge District Council Election Result 1981
Party	Seats	Gains	Losses	Net gain/loss	Seats %	Votes %	Votes	+/−
UUP	8	0	0	0	53.3	42.1	6,241	▼4.9
DUP	4	1	0	▲1	26.7	26.5	3,929	▲9.2
SDLP	2	0	0	0	13.3	14.9	2,217	▼0.1
Ind. Nationalist	1	0	0	0	6.7	6.4	950	▲2.2
Ind. Unionist	0	0	1	▼1	0.0	5.5	818	▲0.8
Alliance	0	0	0	0	0.0	4.6	677	▼1.6

Note: "Votes" are the first preference votes.

== Districts summary ==
Results of the Banbridge District Council election, 1981 by district
Ward	%	Cllrs	%	Cllrs	%	Cllrs	%	Cllrs	Total Cllrs
Ward	UUP		DUP		SDLP		Others		Total Cllrs
Area A	34.7	3	25.3	2	13.9	1	26.1	1	7
Area B	50.4	5	27.9	2	16.2	1	5.5	0	8
Total	42.1	8	26.5	4	14.9	2	16.5	1	15

== Districts results ==
=== Area A ===
1977: 3 x UUP, 1 x DUP, 1 x SDLP, 1 x Independent Nationalist, 1 x Independent Unionist
1981: 3 x UUP, 2 x DUP, 1 x SDLP, 1 x Independent Nationalist
1977-1981 Change: DUP gain from Independent Unionist

Banbridge Area A - 7 seats
Party	Candidate	FPv%	Count							
Party	Candidate	FPv%	1	2	3	4	5	6	7	8
SDLP	James Walsh*	13.86%	1,092							
Ind. Nationalist	Laurence McCartan*	10.98%	865	932.6	988.6					
DUP	Wilfred McFadden	11.52%	907	907.2	907.5	914.5	993.5			
UUP	Wilson Davidson*	11.92%	939	939.2	939.3	972.3	979.3	1,017.3		
UUP	Samuel Cowan*	8.66%	682	682.2	683.4	698.4	699.4	909.4	940.4	1,063.4
DUP	Gareth Bennett	6.34%	499	499.1	499.1	500.1	552.1	566.1	882.2	989.2
UUP	Norman Ferguson*	8.68%	684	684.1	685.1	707.1	708.1	736.1	762.1	959.4
Alliance	Kenneth McElroy	7.28%	573	579.6	605.3	608.3	610.3	626.5	659.8	726.1
Ind. Unionist	Hugh Anderson*	6.83%	538	540.8	543.6	550.6	554.6	567.6	579.6	
DUP	Irene Todd	5.36%	422	422.3	422.4	425.4	436.4	452.4		
UUP	Raymond Armstrong	3.53%	278	278.1	278.2	335.2	337.2			
DUP	Mildred McDowell	2.04%	161	161	161	162.1				
UUP	Herbert Plunkett	1.92%	151	151.1	151.2					
Ind. Nationalist	Margaret McStraw	1.08%	85	111.8						
Electorate: 11,561 Valid: 7,876 (68.13%) Spoilt: 259 Quota: 985 Turnout: 8,135 (70.37%)

=== Area B ===
1977: 5 x UUP, 2 x DUP, 1 x SDLP
1981: 5 x UUP, 2 x DUP, 1 x SDLP
1977-1981 Change: No change

Banbridge Area B - 8 seats
Party	Candidate	FPv%	Count										
Party	Candidate	FPv%	1	2	3	4	5	6	7	8	9	10	11
SDLP	Patrick McAvoy*	16.17%	1,125										
DUP	Brian Biggerstaff*	10.78%	750	751.92	774.92								
UUP	Raymond McCullough*	10.19%	709	719.08	720.08	720.08	789.08						
UUP	Matthew Bailey*	8.47%	589	598.6	626.6	641.04	685.52	688.51	852.51				
UUP	George Gamble	7.55%	525	527.88	528.88	647.2	652.88	652.91	790.91				
UUP	Herbert Heslip*	7.09%	493	494.44	502.92	505.92	674.4	682.68	707.39	740.87	784.87		
UUP	Robert Hill*	6.40%	445	447.88	455.88	478.88	498.88	501.64	556.64	582.02	646.1	659.7	670.34
DUP	David Herron*	6.79%	472	473.92	530.92	539.4	574.4	574.86	600.57	609.75	623.59	626.95	626.95
DUP	Robert McIlroy	6.40%	445	450.76	569.72	577.72	583.72	584.18	598.18	608.98	617.34	617.82	618.96
Alliance	Ebezener Mulligan	1.50%	104	349.28	353.16	447.4	462.88	462.88	470.8	471.34			
UUP	Robert Barr*	5.26%	366	373.2	391.2	429.08	447.08	447.54					
UUP	Eric Williamson	5.46%	380	388.16	395.16	397.12							
Ind. Unionist	Thompson Howe	4.03%	280	326.56	326.56								
DUP	Robert McIlroy	3.92%	273	277.32									
Electorate: 9,513 Valid: 6,956 (73.12%) Spoilt: 172 Quota: 773 Turnout: 7,128 (74.93%)
