= Knockiveagh (District Electoral Area) =

District electoral areas in Banbridge, Northern Ireland

Knockiveagh DEA (1993-2014) within Banbridge

Knockiveagh was one of the three district electoral areas in Banbridge, Northern Ireland which existed from 1985 to 2014. The district elected five members to Banbridge District Council until 1993, and six members until 2014, and formed part of the Upper Bann constituencies for the Northern Ireland Assembly and UK Parliament.

It was created for the 1985 local elections. Two of its wards came from Banbridge Area A and 3 Banbridge Area B, both of which had existed since 1973. It contained the wards of Bannside, Gilford, Katesbridge, Lawrencestown and Loughbrickland. For the 1993 local elections it gained an additional ward, Rathfriland, which was transferred from Newry and Mourne District Council. It was abolished for the 2014 local elections and largely moved into the Banbridge DEA.

== Councillors ==
Election	Councillor (Party)	Councillor (Party)	Councillor (Party)	Councillor (Party)	Councillor (Party)	Councillor (Party)
2011	Seamus Doyle (SDLP)	Brendan Curran (Sinn Féin)	John Hanna (UUP)	Elizabeth Ingram (UUP)	David Herron (DUP)	Glenn Barr (UUP)
2005	Seamus Doyle (SDLP)	Dessie Ward (Sinn Féin)	John Hanna (UUP)	John Ingram (UUP)	Wilfred McFadden (DUP)	Stephen Herron (DUP)
2001	Seamus Doyle (SDLP)	Malachy McCartan (Independent Nationalist)	John Hanna (UUP)	John Ingram (UUP)	Wilfred McFadden (DUP)	Stephen Herron (DUP)
1997	Seamus Doyle (SDLP)	Malachy McCartan (Independent Nationalist)	John Hanna (UUP)	John Ingram (UUP)	Wilfred McFadden (DUP)	Violet Cromie (UUP)
1993	Seamus Doyle (SDLP)	Laurence McCartan (Independent Nationalist)	John Hanna (UUP)	John Ingram (UUP)	Wilfred McFadden (DUP)	Violet Cromie (UUP)
1989	Seamus Doyle (SDLP)	Laurence McCartan (Independent Nationalist)	Vivienne Bennett (UUP)	Samuel Walker (UUP)	Wilfred McFadden (DUP)	6 seats 1993–2014
1985	Peter McGreevy (SDLP)	Laurence McCartan (Independent Nationalist)	Raymond McCullough (UUP)	Samuel Cowan (UUP)	Wilfred McFadden (DUP)	6 seats 1993–2014

== 2011 Election ==
2005: 2 x UUP, 2 x DUP, 1 x SDLP, 1 x Sinn Féin

2011: 3 x UUP, 1 x DUP, 1 x SDLP, 1 x Sinn Féin

2005-2011 Change: UUP gain from DUP

Knockiveagh - 6 seats
Party	Candidate	FPv%	Count				
Party	Candidate	FPv%	1	2	3	4	5
SDLP	Seamus Doyle*	19.12%	1,238				
UUP	Elizabeth Ingram	17.53%	1,135				
Sinn Féin	Brendan Curran	16.05%	1,039				
DUP	David Herron*	13.42%	869	922.9	991.9		
UUP	John Hanna*	10.67%	691	803.7	844.4	945.1	
UUP	Glenn Barr	10.38%	672	763.7	815.9	893.61	955.11
DUP	Ian Wilson	9.59%	621	645.5	690.3	711.96	764.46
TUV	Stephen Herron*	3.23%	209	234.9			
Electorate: 11,012 Valid: 6,474 (58.79%) Spoilt: 105 Quota: 925 Turnout: 6,579 (59.74%)

== 2005 Election ==
2001: 2 x UUP, 2 x DUP, 1 x SDLP, 1 x Independent

2005: 2 x UUP, 2 x DUP, 1 x SDLP, 1 x Sinn Féin

2001-2005 Change: Sinn Féin gain from Independent

Knockiveagh - 6 seats
Party	Candidate	FPv%	Count							
Party	Candidate	FPv%	1	2	3	4	5	6	7	8
SDLP	Seamus Doyle*	15.74%	1,051							
DUP	Stephen Herron*	15.36%	1,026							
UUP	John Ingram*	13.15%	878	882.68	927.58	932.74	1,176.74			
UUP	John Hanna*	8.88%	593	594.71	674.15	675.95	784.37	964.85		
DUP	Wilfred McFadden*	11.08%	740	740.54	755.54	792.98	826.64	852.56	1,272.56	
Sinn Féin	Dessie Ward	11.35%	758	787.25	798.31	798.31	801.67	802.63	804.65	804.65
Independent	Malachy McCartan*	7.46%	498	534.99	610.73	610.85	620.54	625.34	636.96	723.96
DUP	Ian Wilson	6.72%	449	449.27	460.27	475.63	493.26	501.9		
UUP	John McCallister	5.78%	386	387.53	423.71	425.15				
Alliance	David Griffin	4.49%	300	315.57						
Electorate: 10,151 Valid: 6,679 (65.80%) Spoilt: 117 Quota: 955 Turnout: 6,796 (66.95%)

== 2001 Election ==
1997: 3 x UUP, 1 x DUP, 1 x SDLP, 1 x Independent Nationalist

2001: 2 x UUP, 2 x DUP, 1 x SDLP, 1 x Independent

1997-2001 Change: DUP gain from UUP, Independent Nationalist becomes Independent

Knockiveagh - 6 seats
Party	Candidate	FPv%	Count					
Party	Candidate	FPv%	1	2	3	4	5	6
SDLP	Seamus Doyle*	18.29%	1,351					
UUP	John Ingram*	16.28%	1,202					
DUP	Wilfred McFadden*	14.68%	1,084					
UUP	John Hanna*	8.35%	617	622	669.47	734.43	1,122.43	
DUP	Stephen Herron	9.95%	735	736	744.57	963.64	1,089.19	
Independent	Malachy McCartan*	10.40%	768	921	922.16	936.75	951.48	1,014.62
Sinn Féin	Brendan Curran	10.22%	755	874	874.37	875.6	879.67	882.75
UUP	Violet Cromie*	6.58%	486	492	571.88	648.68		
UK Unionist	Stephen Briggs	5.24%	387	388	392.83			
Electorate: 9,937 Valid: 7,385 (74.32%) Spoilt: 108 Quota: 1,056 Turnout: 7,493 (75.41%)

== 1997 Election ==
1993: 3 x UUP, 1 x DUP, 1 x SDLP, 1 x Independent Nationalist

1997: 3 x UUP, 1 x DUP, 1 x SDLP, 1 x Independent Nationalist

1993-1997 Change: No change

Knockiveagh - 6 seats
Party	Candidate	FPv%	Count				
Party	Candidate	FPv%	1	2	3	4	5
UUP	John Ingram*	18.22%	1,129				
DUP	Wilfred McFadden*	17.80%	1,103				
SDLP	Seamus Doyle*	15.26%	946				
UUP	John Hanna*	12.89%	799	862.14	900.14		
UUP	Violet Cromie*	10.83%	671	844.14	880.78	1,082.03	
Ind. Nationalist	Malachy McCartan	11.16%	692	694.42	769.64	781.64	799.64
SDLP	Oliver Moore	10.66%	661	661.22	692.22	694.22	697.72
Alliance	Mary Cook	3.18%	197	200.52			
Electorate: 9,460 Valid: 6,198 (65.52%) Spoilt: 75 Quota: 886 Turnout: 6,273 (66.31%)

== 1993 Election ==
1989: 2 x UUP, 1 x DUP, 1 x SDLP, 1 x Independent Nationalist

1993: 3 x UUP, 1 x DUP, 1 x SDLP, 1 x Independent Nationalist

1989-1993 Change: UUP gain due to the addition of one seat

Knockiveagh - 6 seats
Party	Candidate	FPv%	Count					
Party	Candidate	FPv%	1	2	3	4	5	6
SDLP	Seamus Doyle*	19.12%	1,229					
UUP	John Ingram	16.85%	1,083					
DUP	Wilfred McFadden*	15.20%	977					
Ind. Nationalist	Laurence McCartan*	11.39%	732	811.3	812.8	1,047.8		
UUP	Violet Cromie	12.17%	782	785.9	902	921.38		
UUP	John Hanna	10.45%	672	672.52	690.52	695.42	714.42	741.3
UUP	Samuel Walker*	9.55%	614	614.26	638.56	648.88	663.88	693.42
SDLP	Liam McDermott	5.27%	339	559.74	559.74			
Electorate: 9,323 Valid: 6,428 (68.95%) Spoilt: 107 Quota: 919 Turnout: 6,535 (70.10%)

== 1989 Election ==
1985: 2 x UUP, 1 x DUP, 1 x SDLP, 1 x Independent Nationalist

1989: 2 x UUP, 1 x DUP, 1 x SDLP, 1 x Independent Nationalist

1985-1989 Change: No change

Knockiveagh - 5 seats
Party	Candidate	FPv%	Count					
Party	Candidate	FPv%	1	2	3	4	5	6
SDLP	Seamus Doyle	14.52%	739	942				
Ind. Nationalist	Laurence McCartan*	15.41%	784	839	926.84			
UUP	Vivienne Bennett	14.17%	721	723	724.22	729.1	1,019.1	
DUP	Wilfred McFadden*	16.20%	824	824	825.83	828.88	915.88	
UUP	Samuel Walker	13.74%	699	699	699	700.83	796.83	843.03
UUP	John Hanna	10.34%	526	526	527.22	527.83	570.44	691.64
UUP	James McRoberts	10.30%	524	524	524	524.61		
SDLP	Peter McGreevy*	5.34%	272					
Electorate: 7,162 Valid: 5,089 (71.06%) Spoilt: 117 Quota: 849 Turnout: 5,206 (72.69%)

== 1985 Election ==
1985: 2 x UUP, 1 x DUP, 1 x SDLP, 1 x Independent Nationalist

Knockiveagh - 5 seats
Party	Candidate	FPv%	Count					
Party	Candidate	FPv%	1	2	3	4	5	6
DUP	Wilfred McFadden*	15.78%	766	904				
UUP	Samuel Cowan*	14.94%	725	728	744.72	991.72		
UUP	Raymond McCullough*	15.52%	753	758	799.8	829.8		
Ind. Nationalist	Laurence McCartan*	14.30%	694	695	695.76	714.76	718.91	810.91
SDLP	Peter McGreevy	10.51%	510	510	510	510	510	809
UUP	Herbert Heslip*	10.34%	510	516	538.04	588.4	766.02	766.02
SDLP	Helen Stewart	8.14%	395	395	395	395	395	
UUP	William Hamilton	7.07%	343	345	358.68			
DUP	Elizabeth McDowell	3.24%	157					
Electorate: 7,012 Valid: 4,853 (69.21%) Spoilt: 88 Quota: 809 Turnout: 4,941 (70.46%)
