= Banbridge Area A =

District electoral areas in Banbridge, Northern Ireland

Banbridge Area A was one of the two district electoral areas in Banbridge, Northern Ireland which existed from 1973 to 1985. The district elected seven members to Banbridge District Council, and formed part of the South Down constituencies for the Northern Ireland Assembly and UK Parliament.

It was created for the 1973 local elections, and contained the wards of Ballydown, Central, Edenderry, Gilford, Lawrencetown, Loughbrickland and Seapatrick. It was abolished for the 1985 local elections and replaced by the Banbridge Town DEA and the Knockiveagh DEA.

== Councillors ==
| Election | Councillor (Party) | Councillor (Party) | Councillor (Party) | Councillor (Party) | Councillor (Party) | Councillor (Party) | Councillor (Party) |
|---|---|---|---|---|---|---|---|
| 1981 | Wilfred McFadden (DUP) | Gareth Bennett (DUP) | Wilson Davidson (UUP) | Samuel Cowan (UUP) | Norman Ferguson (UUP) | James Walsh (SDLP) | Laurence McCartan (Independent Nationalist) |
| 1977 | Hugh Anderson (Independent Unionist) | James McElroy (DUP) | Wilson Davidson (UUP) | Samuel Cowan (UUP) | Norman Ferguson (UUP) | James Walsh (SDLP) | Laurence McCartan (Independent Nationalist) |
| 1973 | Hugh Anderson (Independent Unionist) | James Crozier (UUP) | Wilson Davidson (UUP) | Samuel Cowan (UUP) | William McCullagh (UUP) | Daniel Lennon (Independent Nationalist) | Laurence McCartan (Independent Nationalist) |

== 1981 Election ==
1977: 3 x UUP, 1 x DUP, 1 x SDLP, 1 x Independent Nationalist, 1 x Independent Unionist

1981: 3 x UUP, 2 x DUP, 1 x SDLP, 1 x Independent Nationalist

1977-1981 Change: DUP gain from Independent Unionist

Banbridge Area A - 7 seats
| Party | Candidate | FPv% | Count | | | | | | | |
| Party | Candidate | FPv% | 1 | 2 | 3 | 4 | 5 | 6 | 7 | 8 |
|---|---|---|---|---|---|---|---|---|---|---|
| SDLP | James Walsh* | 13.86% | 1,092 | | | | | | | |
| Ind. Nationalist | Laurence McCartan* | 10.98% | 865 | 932.6 | 988.6 | | | | | |
| DUP | Wilfred McFadden | 11.52% | 907 | 907.2 | 907.5 | 914.5 | 993.5 | | | |
| UUP | Wilson Davidson* | 11.92% | 939 | 939.2 | 939.3 | 972.3 | 979.3 | 1,017.3 | | |
| UUP | Samuel Cowan* | 8.66% | 682 | 682.2 | 683.4 | 698.4 | 699.4 | 909.4 | 940.4 | 1,063.4 |
| DUP | Gareth Bennett | 6.34% | 499 | 499.1 | 499.1 | 500.1 | 552.1 | 566.1 | 882.2 | 989.2 |
| UUP | Norman Ferguson* | 8.68% | 684 | 684.1 | 685.1 | 707.1 | 708.1 | 736.1 | 762.1 | 959.4 |
| Alliance | Kenneth McElroy | 7.28% | 573 | 579.6 | 605.3 | 608.3 | 610.3 | 626.5 | 659.8 | 726.1 |
| Ind. Unionist | Hugh Anderson* | 6.83% | 538 | 540.8 | 543.6 | 550.6 | 554.6 | 567.6 | 579.6 | |
| DUP | Irene Todd | 5.36% | 422 | 422.3 | 422.4 | 425.4 | 436.4 | 452.4 | | |
| UUP | Raymond Armstrong | 3.53% | 278 | 278.1 | 278.2 | 335.2 | 337.2 | | | |
| DUP | Mildred McDowell | 2.04% | 161 | 161 | 161 | 162.1 | | | | |
| UUP | Herbert Plunkett | 1.92% | 151 | 151.1 | 151.2 | | | | | |
| Ind. Nationalist | Margaret McStraw | 1.08% | 85 | 111.8 | | | | | | |
Electorate: 11,561 Valid: 7,876 (68.13%) Spoilt: 259 Quota: 985 Turnout: 8,135 (70.37%)

== 1977 Election ==
1973: 4 x UUP, 2 x Independent Nationalist, 1 x Independent Unionist

1977: 3 x UUP, 1 x DUP, 1 x SDLP, 1 x Independent Nationalist, 1 x Independent Unionist

1973-1977 Change: DUP and SDLP gain from UUP and Independent Nationalist

Banbridge Area A - 7 seats
| Party | Candidate | FPv% | Count | | | | | | | | | |
| Party | Candidate | FPv% | 1 | 2 | 3 | 4 | 5 | 6 | 7 | 8 | 9 | 10 |
|---|---|---|---|---|---|---|---|---|---|---|---|---|
| SDLP | James Walsh | 12.18% | 758 | 759 | 780 | | | | | | | |
| UUP | Wilson Davidson* | 11.20% | 697 | 726 | 727 | 727 | 748 | 819 | | | | |
| Ind. Nationalist | Laurence McCartan* | 8.47% | 527 | 529 | 555 | 555.7 | 555.7 | 555.7 | 778.3 | | | |
| UUP | Samuel Cowan* | 8.00% | 498 | 503 | 503 | 503 | 513 | 575 | 576 | 782 | | |
| Ind. Unionist | Hugh Anderson* | 6.73% | 419 | 485 | 487 | 487.1 | 493.1 | 506.1 | 510.1 | 539.1 | 542.82 | 782.82 |
| DUP | James McElroy | 10.17% | 633 | 640 | 640 | 640 | 733 | 737 | 739 | 768 | 769.24 | 779.24 |
| UUP | Norman Ferguson | 7.99% | 497 | 516 | 516 | 516 | 519 | 575 | 576 | 635 | 668.48 | 764.48 |
| DUP | Frederick Baxter | 7.65% | 476 | 479 | 479 | 479 | 546 | 556 | 556 | 569 | 570.86 | 575.86 |
| Alliance | John McWhirter | 6.12% | 381 | 396 | 488 | 488.3 | 489.3 | 489.4 | 499.4 | 504.4 | 505.02 | |
| UUP | William McCullagh* | 5.63% | 350 | 352 | 352 | 352 | 359 | 363 | 365 | | | |
| Ind. Nationalist | Daniel Lennon* | 3.46% | 215 | 218 | 250 | 250.8 | 251.8 | 251.8 | | | | |
| UUP | John Anderson | 3.42% | 213 | 221 | 221 | 221.1 | 223.1 | | | | | |
| UUUP | John Porter | 3.52% | 219 | 221 | 221 | 221 | | | | | | |
| Alliance | Peter Finnegan | 2.80% | 174 | 176 | | | | | | | | |
| Ind. Unionist | James Crozier* | 2.65% | 165 | | | | | | | | | |
Electorate: 10,687 Valid: 6,222 (58.22%) Spoilt: 262 Quota: 778 Turnout: 6,484 (60.67%)

== 1973 Election ==
1973: 4 x UUP, 2 x Independent Nationalist, 1 x Independent Unionist

Banbridge Area A - 7 seats
| Party | Candidate | FPv% | Count | | | | | | | | | | | | | |
| Party | Candidate | FPv% | 1 | 2 | 3 | 4 | 5 | 6 | 7 | 8 | 9 | 10 | 11 | 12 | 13 | 14 |
|---|---|---|---|---|---|---|---|---|---|---|---|---|---|---|---|---|
| UUP | Wilson Davidson | 15.80% | 1,125 | | | | | | | | | | | | | |
| UUP | James Crozier | 14.93% | 1,063 | | | | | | | | | | | | | |
| UUP | Samuel Cowan | 10.90% | 776 | 830.2 | 871.16 | 877.12 | 879.96 | 891.76 | | | | | | | | |
| Ind. Nationalist | Laurence McCartan | 9.45% | 673 | 673.2 | 673.2 | 675.2 | 678.2 | 680.2 | 707.2 | 852.2 | 865.4 | 866.4 | 919.4 | | | |
| UUP | William McCullagh | 10.03% | 714 | 733.4 | 743.16 | 744.72 | 746.72 | 748.04 | 752.52 | 752.52 | 756.88 | 857.6 | 857.76 | 873.64 | 1,109.64 | |
| Ind. Nationalist | Daniel Lennon | 9.55% | 680 | 680 | 680 | 682.16 | 683.16 | 685.16 | 701.16 | 749.16 | 765.16 | 765.16 | 822.16 | 859.16 | 863.32 | 863.32 |
| Ind. Unionist | Hugh Anderson | 3.97% | 283 | 301.8 | 319.08 | 323.6 | 328.28 | 348.68 | 366.12 | 366.12 | 405.2 | 431.4 | 434.72 | 552.4 | 661.24 | 707.24 |
| Alliance | A. L. Cowdy | 3.61% | 257 | 258.8 | 262.16 | 262.32 | 306.32 | 323.04 | 338.2 | 338.2 | 356.16 | 358.68 | 512.68 | 554.68 | 571.12 | 580.12 |
| UUP | R. W. Jardine | 3.48% | 248 | 289 | 331.56 | 336.52 | 342.32 | 358.76 | 369.6 | 369.6 | 376.48 | 477.16 | 479.68 | 514.6 | | |
| Independent | R. G. Quail | 2.01% | 143 | 146.6 | 152.2 | 175.28 | 179.6 | 214.68 | 256.56 | 256.56 | 317.4 | 336.56 | 351.88 | | | |
| Alliance | Peter Finnegan | 3.09% | 220 | 220.2 | 221 | 222 | 247 | 251.16 | 267.64 | 276.64 | 296.64 | 296.64 | | | | |
| UUP | R. Wilson | 2.16% | 154 | 219 | 240.28 | 242.88 | 245.24 | 247.56 | 252.6 | 252.6 | 262 | | | | | |
| NI Labour | J. Hearthwood | 2.39% | 170 | 175.2 | 180 | 185.48 | 196.8 | 206.08 | 226.68 | 228.68 | | | | | | |
| Independent | D. Toman | 2.77% | 197 | 197 | 197 | 197 | 198 | 198 | 204 | | | | | | | |
| Independent | P. Reavey | 1.98% | 141 | 142.6 | 149.64 | 151.8 | 164.6 | 175.28 | | | | | | | | |
| Independent | W. Cross | 1.36% | 97 | 101.2 | 104.72 | 129.12 | 132.48 | | | | | | | | | |
| Alliance | J. H. Rea | 1.50% | 107 | 107.6 | 111.92 | 118.8 | | | | | | | | | | |
| Independent | J. Hozack | 1.03% | 73 | 81.2 | 87.92 | | | | | | | | | | | |
Electorate: 10,205 Valid: 7,121 (69.78%) Spoilt: 91 Quota: 891 Turnout: 7,212 (70.67%)
