= Banbridge Area B =

District electoral areas in Banbridge, Northern Ireland

Banbridge Area B was one of the two district electoral areas in Banbridge, Northern Ireland which existed from 1973 to 1985. The district elected eight members to Banbridge District Council, and formed part of the South Down constituencies for the Northern Ireland Assembly and UK Parliament.

It was created for the 1973 local elections, and contained the wards of Annaclone, Ballyoolymore, Croob, Dromore, Drumadonnell, Garran, Quilly and Skeagh. It was abolished for the 1985 local elections with 5 of its wards forming the Dromore DEA and the remaining 3 forming part of the Knockiveagh DEA.

== Councillors ==
Election	Councillor (Party)	Councillor (Party)	Councillor (Party)	Councillor (Party)	Councillor (Party)	Councillor (Party)	Councillor (Party)	Councillor (Party)
1981	Brian Biggerstaff (DUP)	David Herron (DUP)	Raymond McCullough (UUP)	Herbert Heslip (UUP)	Matthew Bailey (UUP)	Robert Hill (UUP)	George Gamble (UUP)	Patrick McEvoy (SDLP)
1977	Brian Biggerstaff (DUP)	David Herron (DUP)	Raymond McCullough (UUP)	Herbert Heslip (UUP)	Matthew Bailey (UUP)	Robert Hill (UUP)	Robert Barr (UUP)	Patrick McEvoy (SDLP)
1973	J. Gibson (UUP)	J. McClughan (UUP)	Raymond McCullough (UUP)	Herbert Heslip (UUP)	Matthew Bailey (UUP)	Robert Hill (UUP)	Eric Williamson (UUP)	Patrick McEvoy (SDLP)

== 1981 Election ==
1977: 5 x UUP, 2 x DUP, 1 x SDLP

1981: 5 x UUP, 2 x DUP, 1 x SDLP

1977-1981 Change: No change

Banbridge Area B - 8 seats
Party	Candidate	FPv%	Count										
Party	Candidate	FPv%	1	2	3	4	5	6	7	8	9	10	11
SDLP	Patrick McAvoy*	16.17%	1,125										
DUP	Brian Biggerstaff*	10.78%	750	751.92	774.92								
UUP	Raymond McCullough*	10.19%	709	719.08	720.08	720.08	789.08						
UUP	Matthew Bailey*	8.47%	589	598.6	626.6	641.04	685.52	688.51	852.51				
UUP	George Gamble	7.55%	525	527.88	528.88	647.2	652.88	652.91	790.91				
UUP	Herbert Heslip*	7.09%	493	494.44	502.92	505.92	674.4	682.68	707.39	740.87	784.87		
UUP	Robert Hill*	6.40%	445	447.88	455.88	478.88	498.88	501.64	556.64	582.02	646.1	659.7	670.34
DUP	David Herron*	6.79%	472	473.92	530.92	539.4	574.4	574.86	600.57	609.75	623.59	626.95	626.95
DUP	Robert McIlroy	6.40%	445	450.76	569.72	577.72	583.72	584.18	598.18	608.98	617.34	617.82	618.96
Alliance	Ebezener Mulligan	1.50%	104	349.28	353.16	447.4	462.88	462.88	470.8	471.34			
UUP	Robert Barr*	5.26%	366	373.2	391.2	429.08	447.08	447.54					
UUP	Eric Williamson	5.46%	380	388.16	395.16	397.12							
Ind. Unionist	Thompson Howe	4.03%	280	326.56	326.56								
DUP	Robert McIlroy	3.92%	273	277.32									
Electorate: 9,513 Valid: 6,956 (73.12%) Spoilt: 172 Quota: 773 Turnout: 7,128 (74.93%)

== 1977 Election ==
1973: 7 x UUP, 1 x SDLP

1977: 5 x UUP, 2 x DUP, 1 x SDLP

1973-1977 Change: DUP (two seats) gain from UUP (two seats)

Banbridge Area B - 8 seats
Party	Candidate	FPv%	Count								
Party	Candidate	FPv%	1	2	3	4	5	6	7	8	9
UUP	Matthew Bailey*	12.96%	805								
SDLP	Patrick McAvoy*	10.91%	678	678.14	734.14						
UUP	Raymond McCullough*	10.19%	678	688.36	695.36						
DUP	David Herron	10.11%	628	640.32	642.32	740.32					
UUP	Herbert Heslip*	7.60%	472	480.26	498.4	517.54	519.62	519.62	805.62		
UUP	Robert Barr	6.04%	375	427.5	456.78	474.48	475	475	507.26	591.31	629.47
DUP	Brian Biggerstaff	6.73%	418	422.9	423.9	493.32	537	537	553.08	558.41	566.13
UUP	Robert Hill*	6.91%	429	430.82	455.96	475.24	476.8	477.61	524.78	540.36	551.94
UUP	George Gamble	7.36%	457	461.76	481.76	491.04	491.56	492.42	512.26	520.87	545.89
SDLP	Michael O'Hare	6.89%	428	428.42	447.56	448.56	448.56	487.26	491.26	491.26	
UUP	Eric Williamson*	6.10%	379	390.06	407.2	415.62	416.17	418.72			
UUUP	John McKinstry	3.96%	246	248.1	250.24						
Alliance	Edward Gibney	3.53%	219	219.98							
Electorate: 9,844 Valid: 6,212 (63.10%) Spoilt: 245 Quota: 691 Turnout: 6,457 (65.59%)

== 1973 Election ==
1973: 7 x UUP, 1 x SDLP

Banbridge Area B - 8 seats
Party	Candidate	FPv%	Count										
Party	Candidate	FPv%	1	2	3	4	5	6	7	8	9	10	11
UUP	Matthew Bailey	15.89%	1,220										
UUP	Raymond McCullough	11.28%	866										
UUP	J. Gibson	10.64%	817	917.5									
UUP	Herbert Heslip	10.88%	835	876.7									
UUP	Eric Williamson	7.76%	596	767.6	783.8	794.96	796.34	798.64	815.24	821.74	904.74		
UUP	J. McClughan	8.48%	651	662.7	672.3	674.82	676.82	677.82	701.42	701.72	740.16	927.16	
UUP	Robert Hill	7.26%	557	570.5	600.9	608.46	609.64	610.64	623.44	624.15	680.9	775.3	845.86
SDLP	Patrick McAvoy	7.82%	600	600.3	600.3	600.3	605.3	707.3	742.3	742.3	701.3	772.31	774.2
SDLP	Michael O'Hare	7.60%	583	583.6	583.6	583.6	602.6	649.6	671.9	671.9	679.1	706.1	706.73
Independent	J. McGrehan	3.62%	278	281	282.6	282.78	286.78	292.78	327.78	327.81	397.02		
Independent	J. S. Higginson	3.11%	239	247.7	251.3	252.92	254.22	262.42	321.72	322.36			
Alliance	Edward Gibney	1.85%	142	147.7	148.5	148.5	235.5	257.5					
Independent	P. B. Hillen	2.19%	168	168.6	168.8	168.8	169.8						
Alliance	G. B. H. Smyth	0.85%	65	65	65.2	65.2							
Alliance	Ebezener Mulligan	0.77%	59	59.3	59.3	59.84							
Electorate: 10,784 Valid: 7,676 (71.18%) Spoilt: 85 Quota: 853 Turnout: 7,761 (71.97%)
