= 1989 Banbridge District Council election =

Local govt election in Northern Ireland

← 1985	17 May 1989	1993 →

All 15 seats to Banbridge District Council 8 seats needed for a majority
	First party	Second party	Third party
Party	UUP	SDLP	DUP
Seats won	9	3	2
Seat change	▲1	0	▼1
	Fourth party
Party	Ind. Nationalist
Seats won	1
Seat change	0

Elections to Banbridge District Council were held on 17 May 1989 on the same day as the other Northern Irish local government elections. The election used three district electoral areas to elect a total of 15 councillors.

== Election results ==
Banbridge District Council Election Result 1989
Party	Seats	Gains	Losses	Net gain/loss	Seats %	Votes %	Votes	+/−
UUP	9	1	0	▲1	60.0	58.0	8,928	▲10.8
SDLP	3	0	0	0	20.0	19.2	2,959	▲0.5
DUP	2	0	1	▼1	13.3	13.5	2,083	▼11.9
Ind. Nationalist	1	0	0	0	6.7	5.1	784	▲0.4
Alliance	0	0	0	0	0.0	2.2	343	▲0.6
Ulster Democratic	0	0	0	0	0.0	1.9	290	New

Note: "Votes" are the first preference votes.

== Districts summary ==
Results of the Banbridge District Council election, 1989 by district
Ward	%	Cllrs	%	Cllrs	%	Cllrs	%	Cllrs	Total Cllrs
Ward	UUP		SDLP		DUP		Others		Total Cllrs
Banbridge Town	63.7	3	19.6	1	9.8	1	6.9	0	5
Dromore	61.7	4	18.3	1	14.5	0	5.5	0	5
Knockiveagh	48.5	2	19.9	1	16.2	1	15.4	1	5
Total	58.0	9	19.2	3	13.5	2	9.3	1	15

== Districts results ==
=== Banbridge Town ===
1985: 3 x UUP, 1 x SDLP, 1 x DUP
1989: 3 x UUP, 1 x SDLP, 1 x DUP
1985-1989 Change: No change

Banbridge Town - 5 seats
Party	Candidate	FPv%	Count			
Party	Candidate	FPv%	1	2	3	4
UUP	Joan Baird*	31.18%	1,549			
UUP	Archie McKelvey*	16.83%	836			
UUP	John Dobson	15.74%	782	1,384.07		
DUP	Margaret Walker	9.78%	486	572.01	1,054.96	
SDLP	James Walsh*	15.58%	774	782.46	800.66	826.01
Alliance	Mary Doyle	6.90%	343	355.22	394.87	452.72
SDLP	Robert Murray	3.99%	198	199.41	206.56	214.36
Electorate: 8,871 Valid: 4,968 (56.00%) Spoilt: 126 Quota: 829 Turnout: 5,094 (57.42%)

=== Dromore ===
1985: 3 x UUP, 1 x DUP, 1 x SDLP
1989: 4 x UUP, 1 x SDLP
1985-1989 Change: UUP gain from DUP

Dromore - 5 seats
Party	Candidate	FPv%	Count					
Party	Candidate	FPv%	1	2	3	4	5	6
UUP	Drew Nelson	20.81%	1,109					
SDLP	Cassie McDermott*	18.31%	976					
UUP	William Martin*	15.87%	846	874.8	876	916.32		
UUP	Robert Hill*	14.39%	767	814	821.4	844.36	893.36	
UUP	William McCracken	10.68%	569	669.8	676	683.56	729.96	822.6
DUP	Robert McIlroy	8.37%	446	458.2	467.4	475.24	495.12	784.36
DUP	William Lough	6.14%	327	346.4	350.6	354.24	439.4	
Ulster Democratic	Colin Halliday	4.07%	217	224.4	268.8	271.32		
Ulster Democratic	Thomas Dickson	1.37%	73	74.6				
Electorate: 7,883 Valid: 5,330 (67.61%) Spoilt: 103 Quota: 889 Turnout: 5,433 (68.92%)

=== Knockiveagh ===
1985: 2 x UUP, 1 x DUP, 1 x SDLP, 1 x Independent Nationalist
1989: 2 x UUP, 1 x DUP, 1 x SDLP, 1 x Independent Nationalist
1985-1989 Change: No change

Knockiveagh - 5 seats
Party	Candidate	FPv%	Count					
Party	Candidate	FPv%	1	2	3	4	5	6
SDLP	Seamus Doyle	14.52%	739	942				
Ind. Nationalist	Laurence McCartan*	15.41%	784	839	926.84			
UUP	Vivienne Bennett	14.17%	721	723	724.22	729.1	1,019.1	
DUP	Wilfred McFadden*	16.20%	824	824	825.83	828.88	915.88	
UUP	Samuel Walker	13.74%	699	699	699	700.83	796.83	843.03
UUP	John Hanna	10.34%	526	526	527.22	527.83	570.44	691.64
UUP	James McRoberts	10.30%	524	524	524	524.61		
SDLP	Peter McGreevy*	5.34%	272					
Electorate: 7,162 Valid: 5,089 (71.06%) Spoilt: 117 Quota: 849 Turnout: 5,206 (72.69%)
