= 1985 Banbridge District Council election =

Local govt election in Northern Ireland

← 1981	15 May 1985	1989 →

All 15 seats to Banbridge District Council 8 seats needed for a majority
	First party	Second party	Third party
Party	UUP	DUP	SDLP
Seats won	8	3	3
Seat change	0	▼1	▲1
	Fourth party
Party	Ind. Nationalist
Seats won	1
Seat change	0

Elections to Banbridge District Council were held on 15 May 1985 on the same day as the other Northern Irish local government elections. The election used three district electoral areas to elect a total of 15 councillors.

== Election results ==
Banbridge District Council Election Result 1985
Party	Seats	Gains	Losses	Net gain/loss	Seats %	Votes %	Votes	+/−
UUP	8	0	0	0	53.3	47.2	7,022	▲5.1
DUP	3	0	1	▼1	20.0	25.4	3,775	▼1.1
SDLP	3	1	0	▲1	20.0	18.7	2,787	▲3.8
Ind. Nationalist	1	0	0	0	6.7	4.7	694	▼1.7
Alliance	0	0	0	0	0.0	1.6	234	▼3.0
Independent	0	0	0	0	0.0	2.4	364	▲0.5

Note: "Votes" are the first preference votes.

== Districts summary ==
Results of the Banbridge District Council election, 1985 by district
Ward	%	Cllrs	%	Cllrs	%	Cllrs	%	Cllrs	Total Cllrs
Ward	UUP		DUP		SDLP		Others		Total Cllrs
Banbridge Town	44.2	3	25.5	1	18.6	1	11.7	0	5
Dromore	49.5	3	31.5	1	19.0	1	0.0	0	5
Knockiveagh	48.0	2	19.1	1	18.6	1	14.3	1	5
Total	47.2	8	25.4	3	18.7	3	8.7	1	15

== District results ==
=== Banbridge Town ===
1985: 3 x UUP, 1 x SDLP, 1 x DUP

Banbridge Town - 5 seats
Party	Candidate	FPv%	Count					
Party	Candidate	FPv%	1	2	3	4	5	6
DUP	Jim Wells	17.85%	912					
UUP	Archie McKelvey	17.40%	889					
SDLP	James Walsh*	12.33%	630	630.24	685.24	1,023.24		
UUP	Joan Baird	15.87%	811	818.62	844.68	847.68	854.68	
UUP	Ivan Gault	10.96%	560	564.32	600.38	600.38	602.38	853.38
Independent	Leslie Mathews	7.12%	364	366.46	435.56	442.46	580.46	618.44
DUP	Gareth Bennett*	7.67%	392	431.6	432.6	432.6	433.6	
SDLP	James Smyth	6.22%	318	318	353			
Alliance	Frank McQuaid	4.58%	234	234.12				
Electorate: 8,320 Valid: 5,110 (61.42%) Spoilt: 81 Quota: 852 Turnout: 5,191 (62.39%)

=== Dromore ===
1985: 3 x UUP, 1 x DUP, 1 x SDLP

Dromore - 5 seats
Party	Candidate	FPv%	Count						
Party	Candidate	FPv%	1	2	3	4	5	6	7
DUP	Brian Biggerstaff*	18.79%	923						
UUP	Robert Barr	17.48%	859						
UUP	Robert Hill*	13.13%	645	662	684.66	833.66			
SDLP	Cassie McDermott	9.44%	464	465	466.1	473.1	474.15	474.15	904.15
UUP	William Martin	11.66%	573	580	582.42	760.28	787.73	800.45	809.45
DUP	Robert McIlroy	8.51%	418	575	640.78	660.99	668.34	669.9	670.9
SDLP	Bernard Rice	9.57%	470	471	471	471	471.2	471.2	
UUP	James McRoberts	7.21%	354	373	380.04				
DUP	Robert McGregor	4.21%	207						
Electorate: 7,240 Valid: 4,913 (67.86%) Spoilt: 116 Quota: 819 Turnout: 5,029 (69.46%)

=== Knockiveagh ===
1985: 2 x UUP, 1 x DUP, 1 x SDLP, 1 x Independent Nationalist

Knockiveagh - 5 seats
Party	Candidate	FPv%	Count					
Party	Candidate	FPv%	1	2	3	4	5	6
DUP	Wilfred McFadden*	15.78%	766	904				
UUP	Samuel Cowan*	14.94%	725	728	744.72	991.72		
UUP	Raymond McCullough*	15.52%	753	758	799.8	829.8		
Ind. Nationalist	Laurence McCartan*	14.30%	694	695	695.76	714.76	718.91	810.91
SDLP	Peter McGreevy	10.51%	510	510	510	510	510	809
UUP	Herbert Heslip*	10.34%	510	516	538.04	588.4	766.02	766.02
SDLP	Helen Stewart	8.14%	395	395	395	395	395	
UUP	William Hamilton	7.07%	343	345	358.68			
DUP	Elizabeth McDowell	3.24%	157					
Electorate: 7,012 Valid: 4,853 (69.21%) Spoilt: 88 Quota: 809 Turnout: 4,941 (70.46%)
