= Banbridge (District Electoral Area) =

District electoral area in Northern Ireland

- Armagh City, Banbridge and Craigavon Borough Council DEA constituency

Current constituency
- Created: 1985
- Seats: 5 (1985-1993); 6 (1993-2014); 7 (2014-)
- Councillors: Glenn Barr (UUP); Ian Burns (UUP); Joy Ferguson (APNI); Paul Greenfield (DUP); Chris McCartan (SF); Kevin Savage (SF); Ian Wilson (DUP)

Banbridge DEA within Armagh City, Banbridge and Craigavon

Banbridge Town DEA (1993-2014) within Banbridge

Banbridge is one of the seven district electoral areas (DEA) in Armagh City, Banbridge and Craigavon, Northern Ireland. The district elects seven members to Armagh City, Banbridge and Craigavon Borough Council and contains the wards of Banbridge East, Banbridge North, Banbridge South, Banbridge West, Gilford, Loughbrickland and Rathfriland. Banbridge forms part of the Upper Bann constituencies for the Northern Ireland Assembly and UK Parliament.

It was created for the 1985 local elections, replacing Banbridge Area A which had existed since 1973. It was called Banbridge Town until 2014, and contained five wards (Ballydown, Banbridge West, Edenderry, Fort and Seapatrick). For the 1993 local elections it gained an additional ward, The Cut. For the 2014 local elections it gained most of the abolished Knockiveagh DEA.

== Councillors ==
Election	Councillor (Party)	Councillor (Party)	Councillor (Party)	Councillor (Party)	Councillor (Party)	Councillor (Party)	Councillor (Party)
2023	Joy Ferguson (Alliance)	Kevin Savage (Sinn Féin)	Chris McCartan (Sinn Féin)	Ian Burns (UUP)	Glenn Barr (UUP)	Ian Wilson (DUP)	Paul Greenfield (DUP)
August 2021 Co-Option	Brian Pope (Alliance)	Kevin Savage (Sinn Féin)	Jill Macauley (UUP)	Ian Burns (UUP)	Glenn Barr (UUP)	Ian Wilson (DUP)	Paul Greenfield (DUP)
2019	Brian Pope (Alliance)	Kevin Savage (Sinn Féin)	Jill Macauley (UUP)	Ian Burns (UUP)	Glenn Barr (UUP)	Junior McCrum (DUP)	Paul Greenfield (DUP)
August 2016 Co-Option	Seamus Doyle (SDLP)	Kevin Savage (Sinn Féin)	Elizabeth Ingram (UUP)	Ian Burns (UUP)	Glenn Barr (UUP)	Junior McCrum (DUP)	Paul Greenfield (DUP)
2014	Seamus Doyle (SDLP)	Brendan Curran (Sinn Féin)	Elizabeth Ingram (UUP)	Ian Burns (UUP)	Glenn Barr (UUP)	Junior McCrum (DUP)	Paul Greenfield (DUP)
2011	Marie Hamilton (SDLP)	Sheila McQuaid (Alliance)	Joan Baird (UUP)	Ian Burns (UUP)	Jim McElroy (DUP)	Junior McCrum (DUP)	6 seats 1993–2014
2005	Patrick McAleenan (SDLP)	Frank McQuaid (Alliance)	Joan Baird (UUP)	Ian Burns (UUP)	Jim McElroy (DUP)	Junior McCrum (DUP)	6 seats 1993–2014
2001	Patrick McAleenan (SDLP)	Frank McQuaid (Alliance)	Joan Baird (UUP)	Ian Burns (UUP)	Jim McElroy (DUP)	Derick Bell (UUP)	6 seats 1993–2014
1997	James Walsh (SDLP)/ (Independent Nationalist)	Mel Byrne (SDLP)	Joan Baird (UUP)	William Bell (UUP)	Cyril Vage (DUP)	Derick Bell (UUP)	6 seats 1993–2014
1993	James Walsh (SDLP)/ (Independent Nationalist)	Frank McQuaid (Alliance)	Joan Baird (UUP)	Archie McKelvey (UUP)	John Dobson (UUP)	Ian Burns (UUP)	6 seats 1993–2014
1989	James Walsh (SDLP)/ (Independent Nationalist)	Margaret Walker (DUP)	Joan Baird (UUP)	Archie McKelvey (UUP)	John Dobson (UUP)	5 seats 1985–1993	6 seats 1993–2014
1985	James Walsh (SDLP)/ (Independent Nationalist)	Jim Wells (DUP)	Joan Baird (UUP)	Archie McKelvey (UUP)	Ivan Gault (UUP)	5 seats 1985–1993	6 seats 1993–2014

== 2023 Election ==
2019: 3 x UUP, 2 x DUP, 1 x Sinn Féin, 1 x Alliance

2023: 2 x UUP, 2 x Sinn Féin, 2 x DUP, 1 x Alliance

2019–2023 Change: Sinn Féin gain from UUP

Banbridge - 7 seats
Party	Candidate	FPv%	Count					
Party	Candidate	FPv%	1	2	3	4	5	6
Alliance	Joy Ferguson	14.34%	1,961					
UUP	Glenn Barr*	13.92%	1,903					
Sinn Féin	Chris McCartan	12.80%	1,750					
DUP	Paul Greenfield*	12.78%	1,747					
Sinn Féin	Kevin Savage*	11.67%	1,595	1,627.34	1,629.48	1,629.98	2,147.98	
DUP	Ian Wilson*	9.48%	1,296	1,301.46	1,684.74	1,702.04	1,713.04	
UUP	Ian Burns*	7.20%	984	1,029.64	1,143.06	1,262.96	1,344.76	1,433.76
UUP	Jill Macauley*	7.72%	1,055	1,090.28	1,154.28	1,201.28	1,258.96	1,317.96
SDLP	Seamus Doyle	5.76%	787	902.78	909.62	912.62		
TUV	Brian Moorhead	4.34%	593	596.78				
Electorate: 25,504 Valid: 13,671 (53.60%) Spoilt: 141 Quota: 1,709 Turnout: 13,812 (54.16%)

== 2019 Election ==
2014: 3 x UUP, 2 x DUP, 1 x Sinn Féin, 1 x SDLP

2019: 3 x UUP, 2 x DUP, 1 x Sinn Féin, 1 x Alliance

2014-2019 Change: Alliance gain from SDLP

Banbridge - 7 seats
Party	Candidate	FPv%	Count							
Party	Candidate	FPv%	1	2	3	4	5	6	7	8
UUP	Glenn Barr*	14.53%	1,764							
DUP	Paul Greenfield*	12.88%	1,563							
UUP	Ian Burns*	10.45%	1,273	1,421.68	1,554.68					
Sinn Féin	Kevin Savage*	8.55%	1,038	1,038.14	1,040.14	1,533.14				
UUP	Jill Macauley	11.12%	1,350	1,418.88	1,504.28	1,506.28	1,509.24	1,533.11		
DUP	Junior McCrum* †	10.15%	1,232	1,250.06	1,478.32	1,481.32	1,508.4	1,519.56		
Alliance	Brian Pope	11.74%	1,425	1,429.34	1,442.62	1,476.76	1,476.94	1,477.25	1,480.04	1,485.93
SDLP	Seamus Doyle*	10.78%	1,309	1,310.96	1,317.96	1,454.76	1,455.16	1,455.78	1,465.95	1,468.43
Sinn Féin	Vincent McAleenan	5.57%	676	676.28	676.42					
TUV	William Martin	4.19%	508	511.12						
Electorate: 24,418 Valid: 12,138 (49.71%) Spoilt: 136 Quota: 1,518 Turnout: 12,274 (50.27%)

== 2014 Election ==
2011: 2 x UUP, 2 x DUP, 1 x SDLP, 1 x Alliance

2014: 3 x UUP, 2 x DUP, 1 x SDLP, 1 x Sinn Féin

2011-2014 Change: UUP and Sinn Féin gain from Alliance and due to the addition of one seat

Banbridge - 7 seats
Party	Candidate	FPv%	Count						
Party	Candidate	FPv%	1	2	3	4	5	6	7
UUP	Glenn Barr*	17.49%	1,999						
UUP	Ian Burns*	12.01%	1,373	1,724.12					
UUP	Elizabeth Ingram*	11.53%	1,318	1,431.68					
DUP	Paul Greenfield	8.45%	966	986.44	1,090.04	1,114.12	1,114.12	1,137.24	1,554.24
DUP	Junior McCrum*	9.01%	1,030	1,059.68	1,157.68	1,180.92	1,180.92	1,217.32	1,492.32
Sinn Féin	Brendan Curran* †	7.54%	862	862.56	862.56	866.56	1,291.56	1,333.56	1,334.56
SDLP	Seamus Doyle*	8.53%	975	976.96	982.84	1,023.96	1,079.96	1,259.88	1,275.68
SDLP	Marie Hamilton*	5.95%	680	682.8	685.04	720.6	771.6	1,003.56	1,028.36
DUP	Ian Wilson	6.38%	730	755.48	814.56	843.08	843.08	868.04	
Alliance	Sheila McQuaid*	5.07%	579	582.92	592.72	740.52	753.52		
Sinn Féin	Kevin Savage	4.79%	547	547	547	555			
NI21	Emma Hutchinson	3.25%	371	374.92	389.48				
Electorate: 23,380 Valid: 11,430 (48.89%) Spoilt: 162 Quota: 1,429 Turnout: 11,592 (49.58%)

== 2011 Election ==
2005: 2 x UUP, 2 x DUP, 1 x SDLP, 1 x Alliance

2011: 2 x UUP, 2 x DUP, 1 x SDLP, 1 x Alliance

2005-2011 Change: No change

Banbridge Town - 6 seats
Party	Candidate	FPv%	Count							
Party	Candidate	FPv%	1	2	3	4	5	6	7	8
UUP	Joan Baird*	24.86%	1,466							
DUP	Junior McCrum*	17.60%	1,038							
UUP	Ian Burns*	11.46%	676	1,200.6						
DUP	Jim McElroy*	8.02%	473	518.58	750.57	917.01				
Alliance	Sheila McQuaid	8.19%	483	495.47	544.68	546.39	546.63	588.63	679.03	788.34
SDLP	Marie Hamilton	6.22%	367	375.17	389.97	391.11	391.27	450.7	655.84	684.07
Sinn Féin	Vincent McAleenan	7.38%	435	435.86	436.23	436.23	436.23	601.23	645.6	645.68
DUP	John McKinstry	5.22%	308	324.34	370.59	391.11	457.35	460.35	468.6	
SDLP	Cassie McDermott*	5.36%	316	325.46	339.52	340.66	340.99	383.9		
Independent	Dessie Ward*	5.68%	335	335.43	335.8	335.8	335.8			
Electorate: 11,532 Valid: 5,897 (51.14%) Spoilt: 124 Quota: 843 Turnout: 6,021 (52.21%)

== 2005 Election ==
2001: 3 x UUP, 1 x DUP, 1 x SDLP, 1 x Alliance

2005: 2 x UUP, 2 x DUP, 1 x SDLP, 1 x Alliance

2001-2005 Change: DUP gain from UUP

Banbridge Town - 6 seats
Party	Candidate	FPv%	Count					
Party	Candidate	FPv%	1	2	3	4	5	6
UUP	Joan Baird*	24.17%	1,501					
SDLP	Patrick McAleenan*	19.91%	1,236					
DUP	Jim McElroy*	17.54%	1,089					
DUP	Junior McCrum	15.25%	947					
Alliance	Frank McQuaid*	8.95%	556	593.8	920.54			
UUP	Ian Burns*	8.84%	549	724.14	729.72	839.44	862.93	876.13
UUP	Derick Bell*	5.33%	331	727.06	740.7	824.68	857.08	873.8
Electorate: 10,610 Valid: 6,209 (58.52%) Spoilt: 102 Quota: 888 Turnout: 6,311 (59.48%)

== 2001 Election ==
1997: 3 x UUP, 1 x DUP, 1 x SDLP, 1 x Independent Nationalist

2001: 3 x UUP, 1 x DUP, 1 x SDLP, 1 x Alliance

1997-2001 Change: Alliance gain from Independent Nationalist

Banbridge Town - 6 seats
Party	Candidate	FPv%	Count					
Party	Candidate	FPv%	1	2	3	4	5	6
UUP	Joan Baird*	28.06%	1,979					
SDLP	Patrick McAleenan	19.90%	1,404					
UUP	Derick Bell*	6.49%	458	1,063.5				
Alliance	Frank McQuaid	5.95%	420	461.5	702.68	724.68	1,054.68	
DUP	Jim McElroy	10.97%	774	808.5	810.67	938.17	952.41	953.49
UUP	Ian Burns	6.88%	485	674	679.58	800.58	882	926
DUP	Kyle Ferguson	9.88%	697	723	723.31	813.62	819.05	819.93
Independent	Frank Downey	6.35%	448	467.5	608.55	633.05		
UK Unionist	David Hudson	5.51%	389	431.5	431.81			
Electorate: 10,939 Valid: 7,054 (64.48%) Spoilt: 118 Quota: 1,008 Turnout: 7,172 (65.56%)

== 1997 Election ==
1993: 4 x UUP, 1 x SDLP, 1 x Alliance

1997: 3 x UUP, 1 x DUP, 1 x SDLP, 1 x Independent Nationalist

1993-1997 Change: DUP and Independent Nationalist gain from UUP and Alliance

Banbridge Town - 6 seats
Party	Candidate	FPv%	Count					
Party	Candidate	FPv%	1	2	3	4	5	6
UUP	Joan Baird*	28.00%	1,438					
Ind. Nationalist	James Walsh*	15.75%	809					
UUP	William Bell	11.72%	602	773.99				
UUP	Derick Bell	7.59%	390	729.08	730.88	752.44		
SDLP	Mel Byrne	10.40%	534	536.94	577.34	577.45	577.45	771.45
DUP	Cyril Vage	11.31%	581	639.31	641.41	644.6	646.3	675.26
UUP	Ian Burns*	6.99%	359	460.92	462.02	472.47	487.47	571.21
Alliance	Frank McQuaid*	8.24%	423	444.56	469.96	472.05	473.15	
Electorate: 10,351 Valid: 5,136 (49.62%) Spoilt: 79 Quota: 734 Turnout: 5,215 (50.38%)

== 1993 Election ==
1989: 3 x UUP, 1 x SDLP, 1 x DUP

1993: 4 x UUP, 1 x SDLP, 1 x Alliance

1989-1993 Change: UUP and Alliance gain from DUP and due to the addition of one seat

Banbridge Town - 6 seats
Party	Candidate	FPv%	Count		
Party	Candidate	FPv%	1	2	3
UUP	Joan Baird*	27.45%	1,352		
SDLP	James Walsh*	24.08%	1,186		
UUP	Archie McKelvey*	14.66%	722		
UUP	Ian Burns	10.29%	507	830.4	
UUP	John Dobson*	10.50%	517	744.85	
Alliance	Frank McQuaid	5.87%	289	303.21	776.25
DUP	Margaret Davis	7.17%	353	426.01	320.87
Electorate: 9,533 Valid: 4,926 (51.67%) Spoilt: 88 Quota: 704 Turnout: 5,014 (52.60%)

== 1989 Election ==
1985: 3 x UUP, 1 x SDLP, 1 x DUP

1989: 3 x UUP, 1 x SDLP, 1 x DUP

1985-1989 Change: No change

Banbridge Town - 5 seats
Party	Candidate	FPv%	Count			
Party	Candidate	FPv%	1	2	3	4
UUP	Joan Baird*	31.18%	1,549			
UUP	Archie McKelvey*	16.83%	836			
UUP	John Dobson	15.74%	782	1,384.07		
DUP	Margaret Walker	9.78%	486	572.01	1,054.96	
SDLP	James Walsh*	15.58%	774	782.46	800.66	826.01
Alliance	Mary Doyle	6.90%	343	355.22	394.87	452.72
SDLP	Robert Murray	3.99%	198	199.41	206.56	214.36
Electorate: 8,871 Valid: 4,968 (56.00%) Spoilt: 126 Quota: 829 Turnout: 5,094 (57.42%)

== 1985 Election ==
1985: 3 x UUP, 1 x SDLP, 1 x DUP

Banbridge Town - 5 seats
Party	Candidate	FPv%	Count					
Party	Candidate	FPv%	1	2	3	4	5	6
DUP	Jim Wells	17.85%	912					
UUP	Archie McKelvey	17.40%	889					
SDLP	James Walsh*	12.33%	630	630.24	685.24	1,023.24		
UUP	Joan Baird	15.87%	811	818.62	844.68	847.68	854.68	
UUP	Ivan Gault	10.96%	560	564.32	600.38	600.38	602.38	853.38
Independent	Leslie Mathews	7.12%	364	366.46	435.56	442.46	580.46	618.44
DUP	Gareth Bennett*	7.67%	392	431.6	432.6	432.6	433.6	
SDLP	James Smyth	6.22%	318	318	353			
Alliance	Frank McQuaid	4.58%	234	234.12				
Electorate: 8,320 Valid: 5,110 (61.42%) Spoilt: 81 Quota: 852 Turnout: 5,191 (62.39%)
