= 1997 Banbridge District Council election =

Local govt election in Northern Ireland

← 1993	21 May 1997	2001 →

All 17 seats to Banbridge District Council 9 seats needed for a majority
	First party	Second party	Third party
Party	UUP	SDLP	DUP
Seats won	9	3	3
Seat change	▼1	0	▲1
	Fourth party	Fifth party
Party	Ind. Nationalist	Alliance
Seats won	2	0
Seat change	▲1	▼1
- Results by district electoral area, shaded by First Preference Votes.

Elections to Banbridge District Council were held on 21 May 1997 on the same day as the other Northern Irish local government elections. The election used three district electoral areas to elect a total of 17 councillors.

== Election results ==
Banbridge District Council Election Result 1997
Party	Seats	Gains	Losses	Net gain/loss	Seats %	Votes %	Votes	+/−
UUP	9	0	1	▼1	52.9	52.4	8,408	▼5.2
SDLP	3	0	0	0	17.6	17.9	2,870	▼4.8
DUP	3	1	0	▲1	17.6	15.3	2,454	▲1.8
Ind. Nationalist	2	1	0	▲1	11.8	9.3	1,501	▲4.9
Alliance	0	0	1	▼1	0.0	5.1	822	▲3.3
Ind. Unionist	0	0	0	0	0.0	1.8	289	▲1.8

Note: "Votes" are the first preference votes.

== Districts summary ==
Results of the Banbridge District Council election, 1997 by district
Ward	%	Cllrs	%	Cllrs	%	Cllrs	%	Cllrs	%	Cllrs	Total Cllrs
Ward	UUP		SDLP		DUP		Alliance		Others		Total Cllrs
Banbridge Town	54.3	3	10.4	1	11.3	1	8.2	0	15.8	1	6
Dromore	57.8	3	15.4	1	16.4	1	4.3	0	6.1	0	5
Knockiveagh	43.3	3	26.8	1	18.4	1	0.0	0	11.5	1	6
Total	52.4	9	17.9	3	15.3	3	5.1	0	9.3	2	17

== Districts results ==
=== Banbridge Town ===
1993: 4 x UUP, 1 x SDLP, 1 x Alliance
1997: 3 x UUP, 1 x DUP, 1 x SDLP, 1 x Independent Nationalist
1993-1997 Change: DUP and Independent Nationalist gain from UUP and Alliance

Banbridge Town - 6 seats
Party	Candidate	FPv%	Count					
Party	Candidate	FPv%	1	2	3	4	5	6
UUP	Joan Baird*	28.00%	1,438					
Ind. Nationalist	James Walsh*	15.75%	809					
UUP	William Bell	11.72%	602	773.99				
UUP	Derick Bell	7.59%	390	729.08	730.88	752.44		
SDLP	Mel Byrne	10.40%	534	536.94	577.34	577.45	577.45	771.45
DUP	Cyril Vage	11.31%	581	639.31	641.41	644.6	646.3	675.26
UUP	Ian Burns*	6.99%	359	460.92	462.02	472.47	487.47	571.21
Alliance	Frank McQuaid*	8.24%	423	444.56	469.96	472.05	473.15	
Electorate: 10,351 Valid: 5,136 (49.62%) Spoilt: 79 Quota: 734 Turnout: 5,215 (50.38%)

=== Dromore ===
1993: 3 x UUP, 1 x DUP, 1 x SDLP
1997: 3 x UUP, 1 x DUP, 1 x SDLP
1993-1997 Change: No change

Dromore - 5 seats
Party	Candidate	FPv%	Count			
Party	Candidate	FPv%	1	2	3	4
UUP	William McCracken*	28.77%	1,358			
UUP	Thomas Gribben	14.13%	667	919.84		
UUP	William Martin*	15.02%	709	876.16		
DUP	David Herron*	16.31%	770	836.36		
SDLP	Cassie McDermott*	15.44%	729	732.78	735.98	816.98
Ind. Unionist	Robert Hill	6.06%	286	349	467.8	539.36
Alliance	Julian Crozier	4.28%	202	209.98	218.78	
Electorate: 8,457 Valid: 4,721 (55.82%) Spoilt: 66 Quota: 787 Turnout: 4,787 (56.60%)

=== Knockiveagh ===
1993: 3 x UUP, 1 x DUP, 1 x SDLP, 1 x Independent Nationalist
1997: 3 x UUP, 1 x DUP, 1 x SDLP, 1 x Independent Nationalist
1993-1997 Change: No change

Knockiveagh - 6 seats
Party	Candidate	FPv%	Count				
Party	Candidate	FPv%	1	2	3	4	5
UUP	John Ingram*	18.22%	1,129				
DUP	Wilfred McFadden*	17.80%	1,103				
SDLP	Seamus Doyle*	15.26%	946				
UUP	John Hanna*	12.89%	799	862.14	900.14		
UUP	Violet Cromie*	10.83%	671	844.14	880.78	1,082.03	
Ind. Nationalist	Malachy McCartan	11.16%	692	694.42	769.64	781.64	799.64
SDLP	Oliver Moore	10.66%	661	661.22	692.22	694.22	697.72
Alliance	Mary Cook	3.18%	197	200.52			
Electorate: 9,460 Valid: 6,198 (65.52%) Spoilt: 75 Quota: 886 Turnout: 6,273 (66.31%)
