= 1993 Banbridge District Council election =

Local govt election in Northern Ireland

← 1989	19 May 1993	1997 →

All 17 seats to Banbridge District Council 9 seats needed for a majority
	First party	Second party	Third party
Party	UUP	SDLP	DUP
Seats won	10	3	2
Seat change	▲1	0	0
	Fourth party	Fifth party
Party	Alliance	Ind. Nationalist
Seats won	1	1
Seat change	▲1	0
- Party with the most votes by district.

Elections to Banbridge District Council were held on 19 May 1993 on the same day as the other Northern Irish local government elections. The election used three district electoral areas to elect a total of 17 councillors.

== Election results ==
Banbridge District Council Election Result 1993
Party	Seats	Gains	Losses	Net gain/loss	Seats %	Votes %	Votes	+/−
UUP	10	2	1	▲1	58.8	57.6	9,418	▼0.4
SDLP	3	0	0	0	17.6	22.7	3,705	▲3.5
DUP	2	1	1	0	11.8	13.5	2,203	0.0
Ind. Nationalist	1	0	0	0	5.9	4.4	732	▼0.7
Alliance	1	1	0	▲1	5.9	1.8	289	▼0.4

Note: "Votes" are the first preference votes.

== Districts summary ==
Results of the Banbridge District Council election, 1993 by district
Ward	%	Cllrs	%	Cllrs	%	Cllrs	%	Cllrs	%	Cllrs	Total Cllrs
Ward	UUP		SDLP		DUP		Alliance		Others		Total Cllrs
Banbridge Town	62.9	4	24.1	1	7.2	0	5.8	1	0.0	0	6
Dromore	63.5	3	19.0	1	17.5	1	0.0	0	0.0	0	5
Knockiveagh	49.0	3	24.4	1	15.2	1	0.0	0	11.4	1	6
Total	57.6	10	22.7	3	13.5	2	1.8	1	4.4	1	17

== District results ==
=== Banbridge Town ===
1989: 3 x UUP, 1 x SDLP, 1 x DUP
1993: 4 x UUP, 1 x SDLP, 1 x Alliance
1989-1993 Change: UUP and Alliance gain from DUP and due to the addition of one seat

Banbridge Town - 6 seats
Party	Candidate	FPv%	Count		
Party	Candidate	FPv%	1	2	3
UUP	Joan Baird*	27.45%	1,352		
SDLP	James Walsh*	24.08%	1,186		
UUP	Archie McKelvey*	14.66%	722		
UUP	Ian Burns	10.29%	507	830.4	
UUP	John Dobson*	10.50%	517	744.85	
Alliance	Frank McQuaid	5.87%	289	303.21	776.25
DUP	Margaret Davis	7.17%	353	426.01	320.87
Electorate: 9,533 Valid: 4,926 (51.67%) Spoilt: 88 Quota: 704 Turnout: 5,014 (52.60%)

=== Dromore ===
1989: 4 x UUP, 1 x SDLP
1993: 3 x UUP, 1 x SDLP, 1 x DUP
1989-1993 Change: DUP gain from UUP

Dromore - 5 seats
Party	Candidate	FPv%	Count		
Party	Candidate	FPv%	1	2	3
UUP	Drew Nelson*	19.63%	980		
SDLP	Cassie McDermott*	19.05%	951		
DUP	David Herron	17.48%	873		
UUP	William Martin*	15.44%	771	794.4	854.85
UUP	William McCracken*	14.92%	745	826	845.53
UUP	Robert Hill*	13.48%	673	711.1	748.61
Electorate: 7,917 Valid: 4,993 (63.07%) Spoilt: 70 Quota: 833 Turnout: 5,063 (63.95%)

=== Knockiveagh ===
1989: 2 x UUP, 1 x DUP, 1 x SDLP, 1 x Independent Nationalist
1993: 3 x UUP, 1 x DUP, 1 x SDLP, 1 x Independent Nationalist
1989-1993 Change: UUP gain due to the addition of one seat

Knockiveagh - 6 seats
Party	Candidate	FPv%	Count					
Party	Candidate	FPv%	1	2	3	4	5	6
SDLP	Seamus Doyle*	19.12%	1,229					
UUP	John Ingram	16.85%	1,083					
DUP	Wilfred McFadden*	15.20%	977					
Ind. Nationalist	Laurence McCartan*	11.39%	732	811.3	812.8	1,047.8		
UUP	Violet Cromie	12.17%	782	785.9	902	921.38		
UUP	John Hanna	10.45%	672	672.52	690.52	695.42	714.42	741.3
UUP	Samuel Walker*	9.55%	614	614.26	638.56	648.88	663.88	693.42
SDLP	Liam McDermott	5.27%	339	559.74	559.74			
Electorate: 9,323 Valid: 6,428 (68.95%) Spoilt: 107 Quota: 919 Turnout: 6,535 (70.10%)
