= Herbert Heslip =

Member of Banbridge District Council
- In office 30 May 1973 – 15 May 1985
- Preceded by: Council established
- Succeeded by: District abolished
- Constituency: Banbridge Area B

Member of the Northern Ireland Constitutional Convention for South Down
- In office 1975–1976
- Preceded by: Convention created
- Succeeded by: Convention dissolved

Deputy speaker of the Northern Ireland Assembly
- In office 1973–1974

Member of the Northern Ireland Assembly for South Down
- In office 28 June 1973 – 1974
- Preceded by: Assembly established
- Succeeded by: Assembly abolished

Personal details
- Born: 1913 Ballinaskeagh, Northern Ireland
- Died: 1992 (aged 78–79)
- Party: Ulster Unionist Party

Herbert Heslip (1913 in Ballinaskeagh, near Banbridge, County Down – 1992) was a Northern Irish politician with the Ulster Unionist Party (UUP).

== Political career ==
Heslip was a well-known figure in County Down Unionism, serving as a member of Down District Council from 1968 to 1973 and then of Banbridge District Council until 1985.

Heslip was elected to the Northern Ireland Assembly of 1973, serving as Deputy Speaker, and also sat in its successor the Northern Ireland Constitutional Convention, in both cases for South Down. By conviction, however, he supported a return to the Parliament of Northern Ireland. He also served as Vice-President of the loyalist vigilante group Down Orange Welfare.

Following the death of Raymond McCullough in 1985 Heslip attempted to regain his seat in a by-election but was defeated by McCullough's daughter, Vivienne.

Northern Ireland Assembly (1973)
New assembly	Assembly Member for South Down; 1973–1974	Assembly abolished
Northern Ireland Constitutional Convention
New convention	Member for South Down; 1975–1976	Convention dissolved
