= Raymond McCullough =

Politician from Northern Ireland (1919–1985)

Member of the Northern Ireland Assembly for South Down
- In office 20 October 1982 – June 1985
- Preceded by: Assembly re-established
- Succeeded by: Jeffrey Donaldson

Member of Banbridge District Council
- In office 15 May 1985 – June 1985
- Preceded by: District created
- Succeeded by: Vivienne Bennett
- Constituency: Knockiveagh
- In office 30 May 1973 – 15 May 1985
- Preceded by: Council established
- Succeeded by: District abolished
- Constituency: Banbridge Area B

Personal details
- Born: 1919 County Down, Northern Ireland
- Died: June 1985 (aged 65–66)
- Party: Ulster Unionist

Raymond McCullough (1919 – June 1985) was a Northern Irish Ulster Unionist Party (UUP) politician who served as a Member of the Legislative Assembly (MLA) for South Down from 1982, until 1985.

== Political career ==
McCullough, who was Honorary Secretary of the South Down Unionist Association, was elected to Banbridge District Council on that body's creation in 1973 and subsequently served as chairman. He was elected to the Northern Ireland Assembly at the 1982 election to represent South Down and remained a member until his death, serving as deputy chairman of the Agriculture Committee and a member of the Environment Committee. He was also a member of the committee of the Grand Orange Lodge of Ireland under the Loyal Orange Institution.

Following his death McCullough's Assembly seat was won by Jeffrey Donaldson whilst his council seat went to his daughter Vivienne McCullough as an independent Unionist.

Northern Ireland Assembly (1982)
| New assembly | MPA for South Down; 1982–1985 | Succeeded by Jeffrey Donaldson |
