= Charleroi =

City in Hainaut Province, Wallonia, Belgium

Charleroi: Tchålerwè (Walloon)
- City and municipality
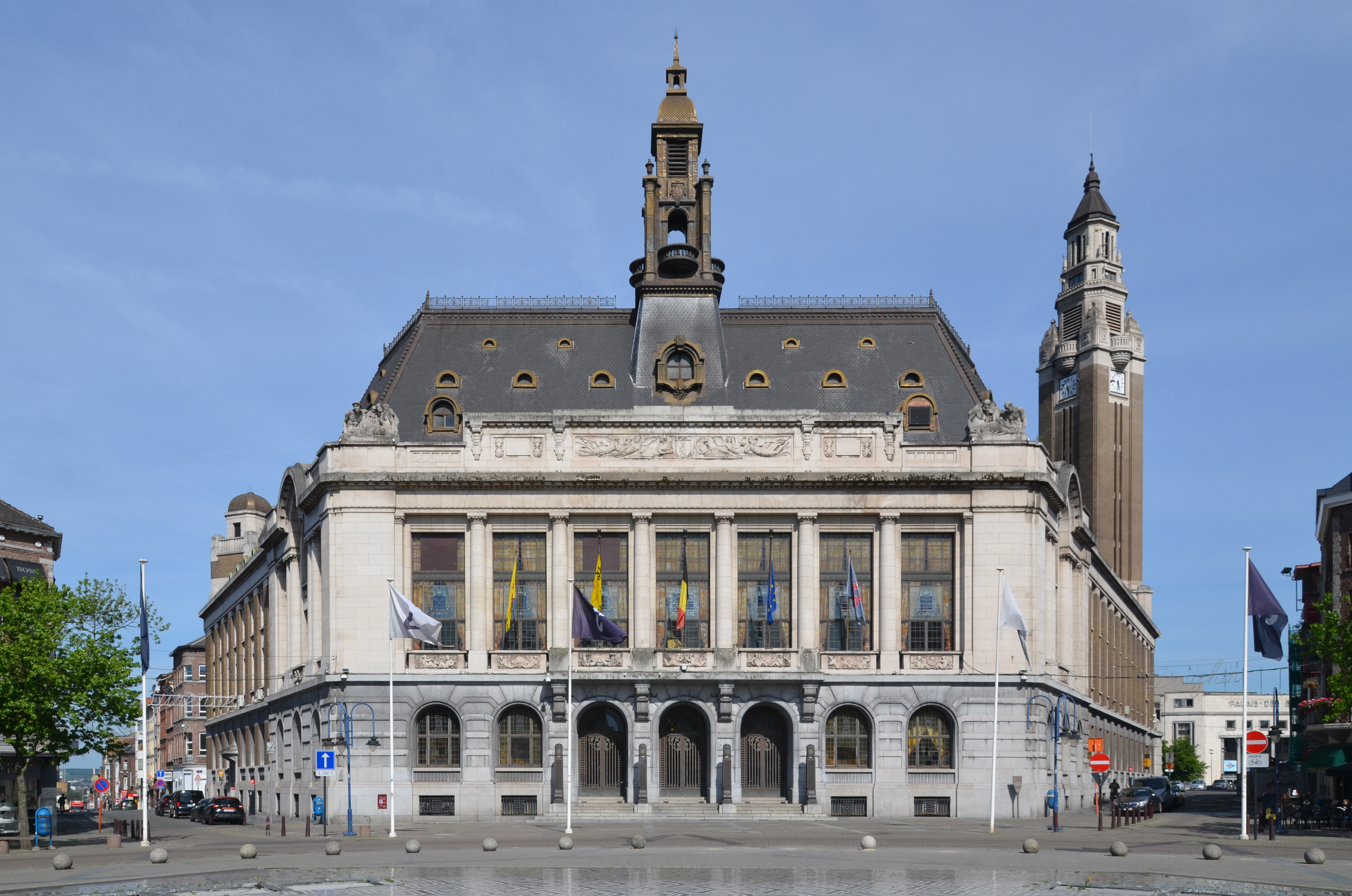
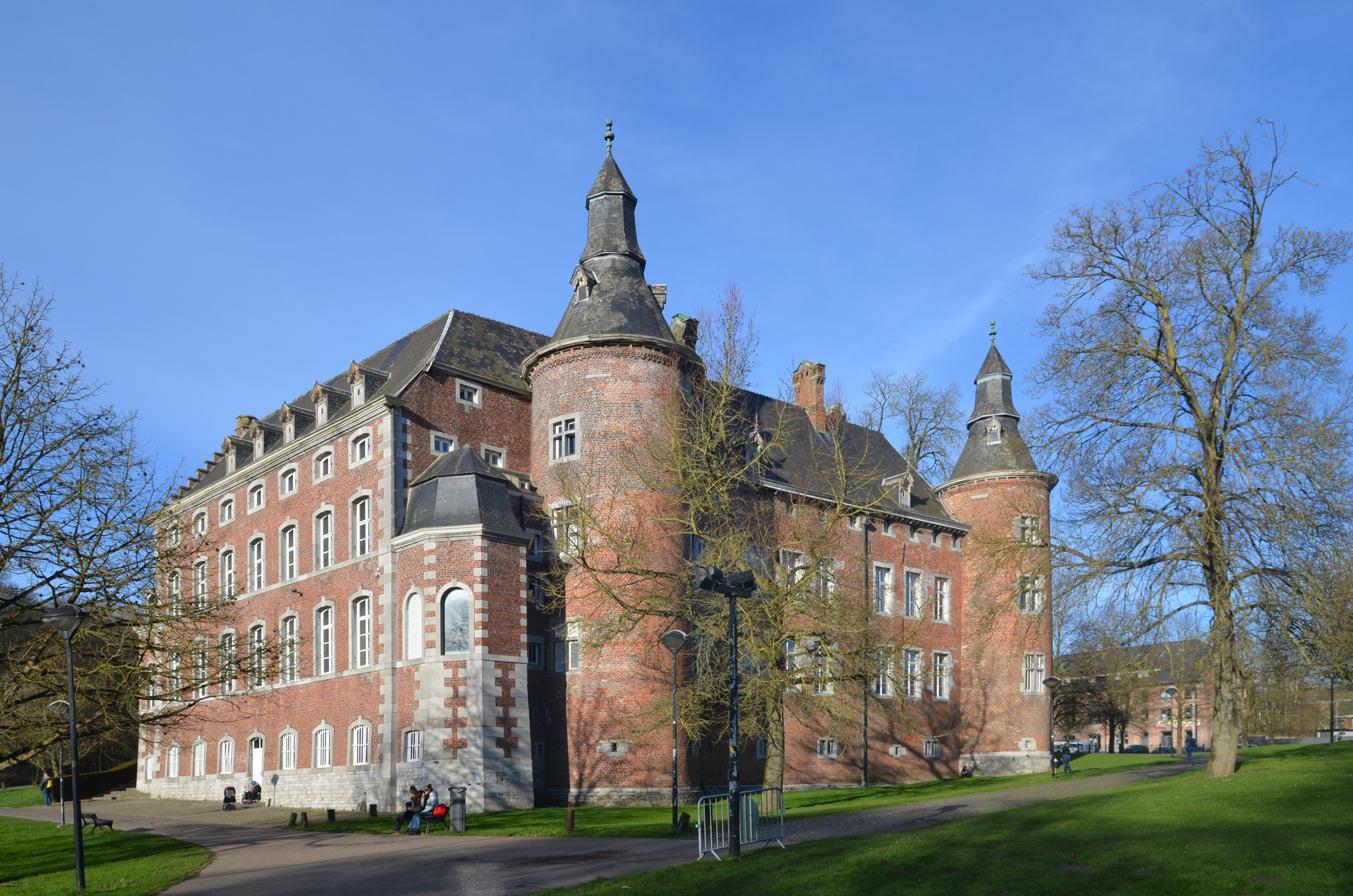
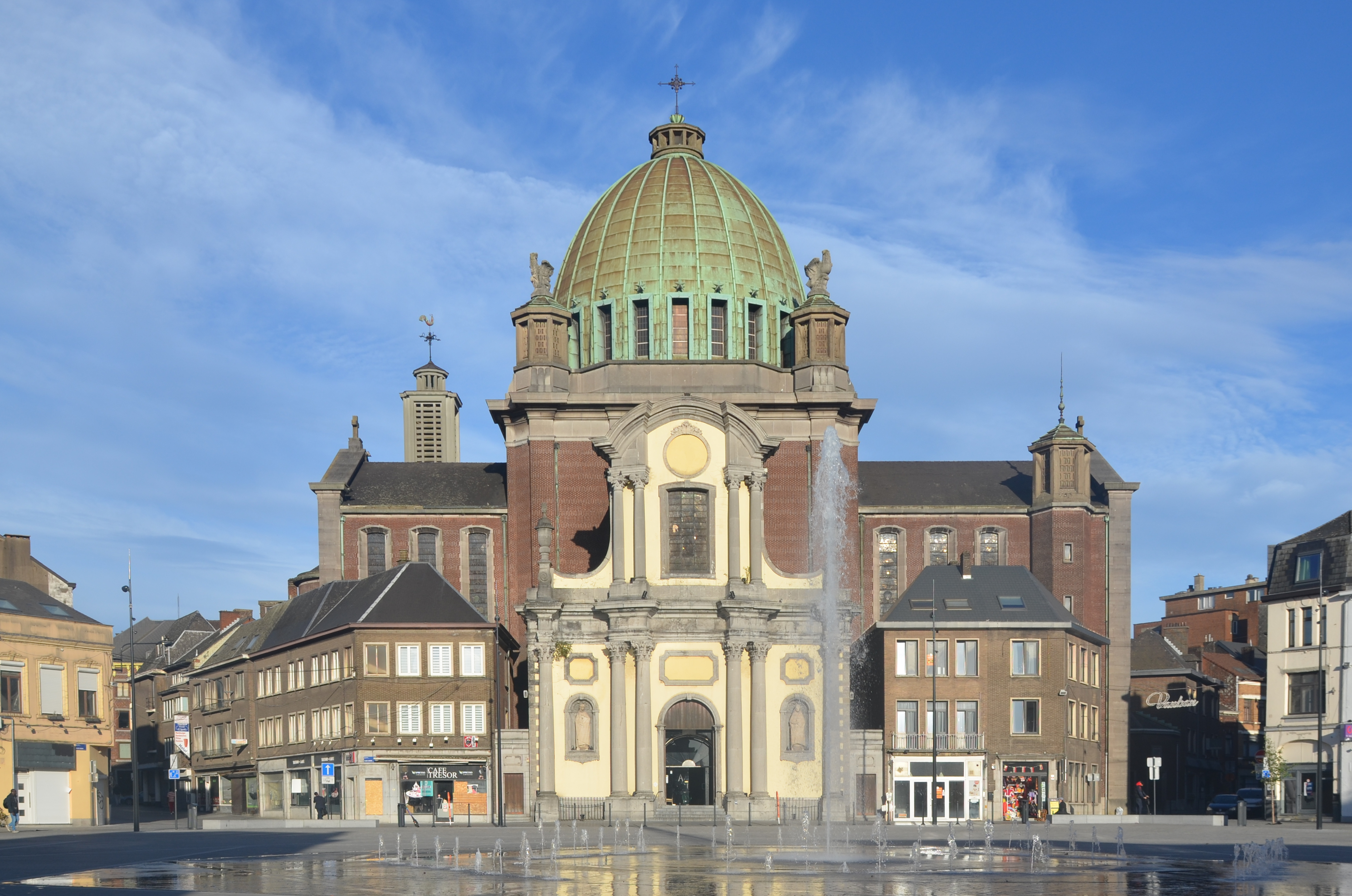
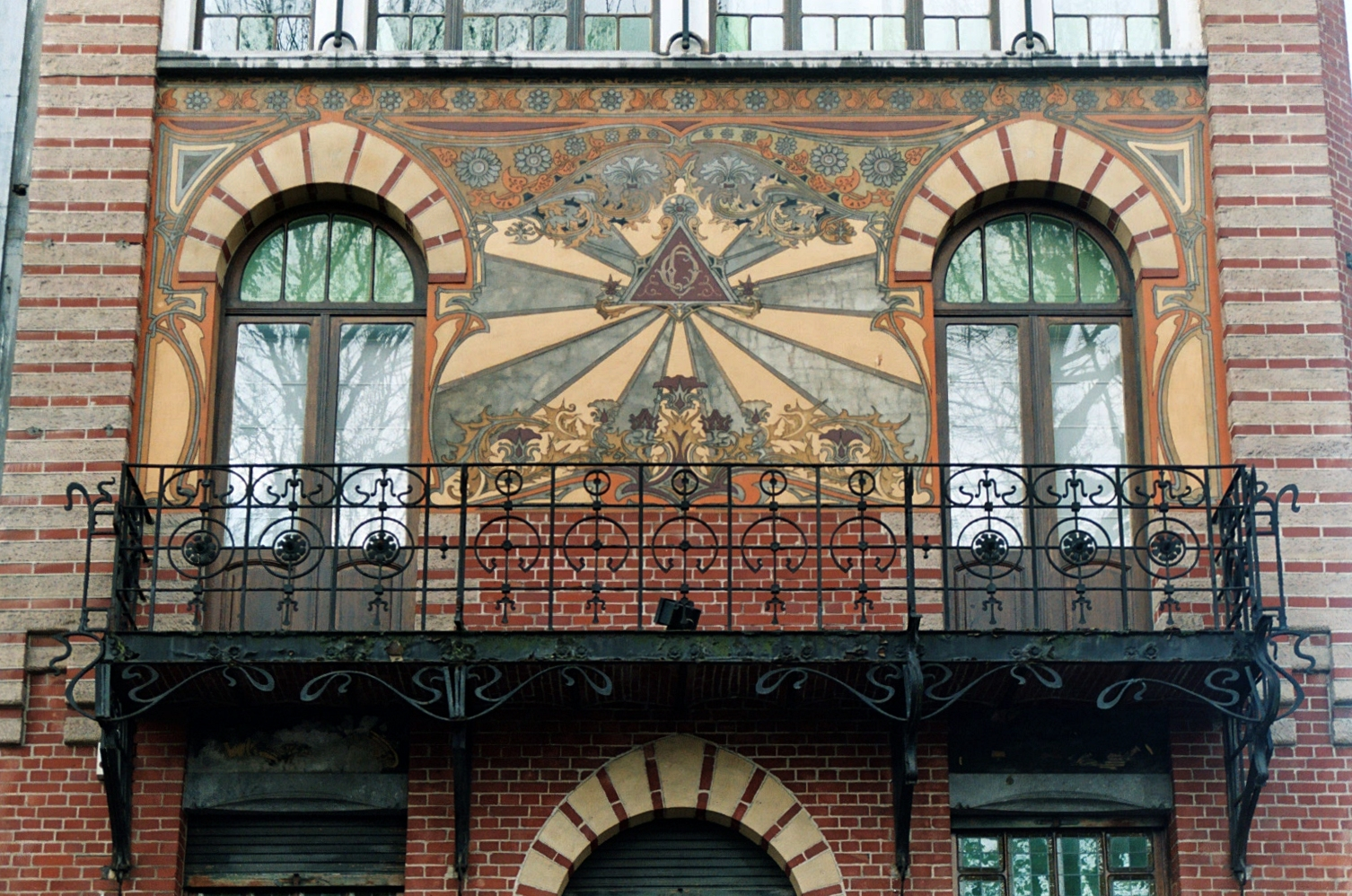
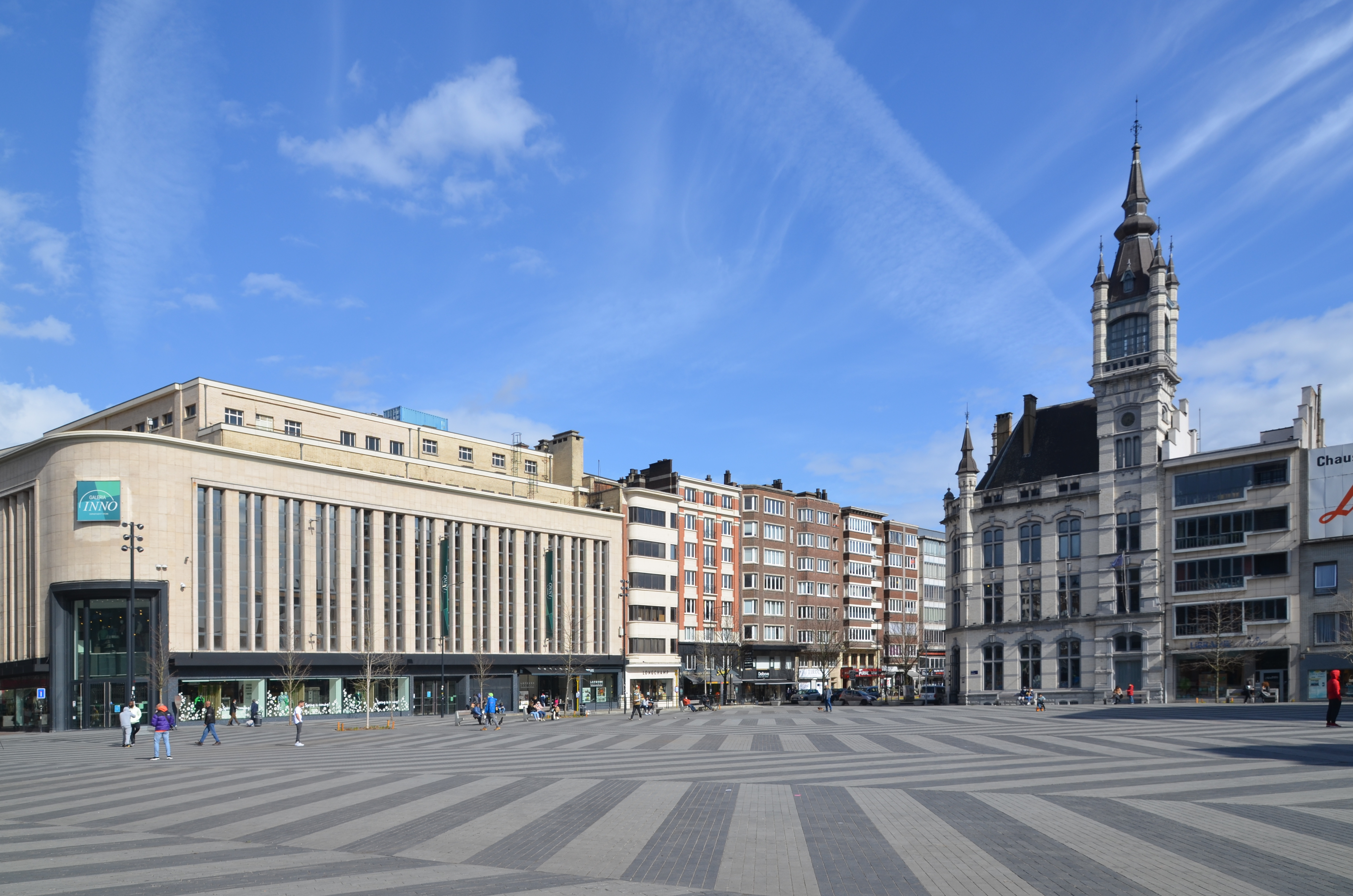
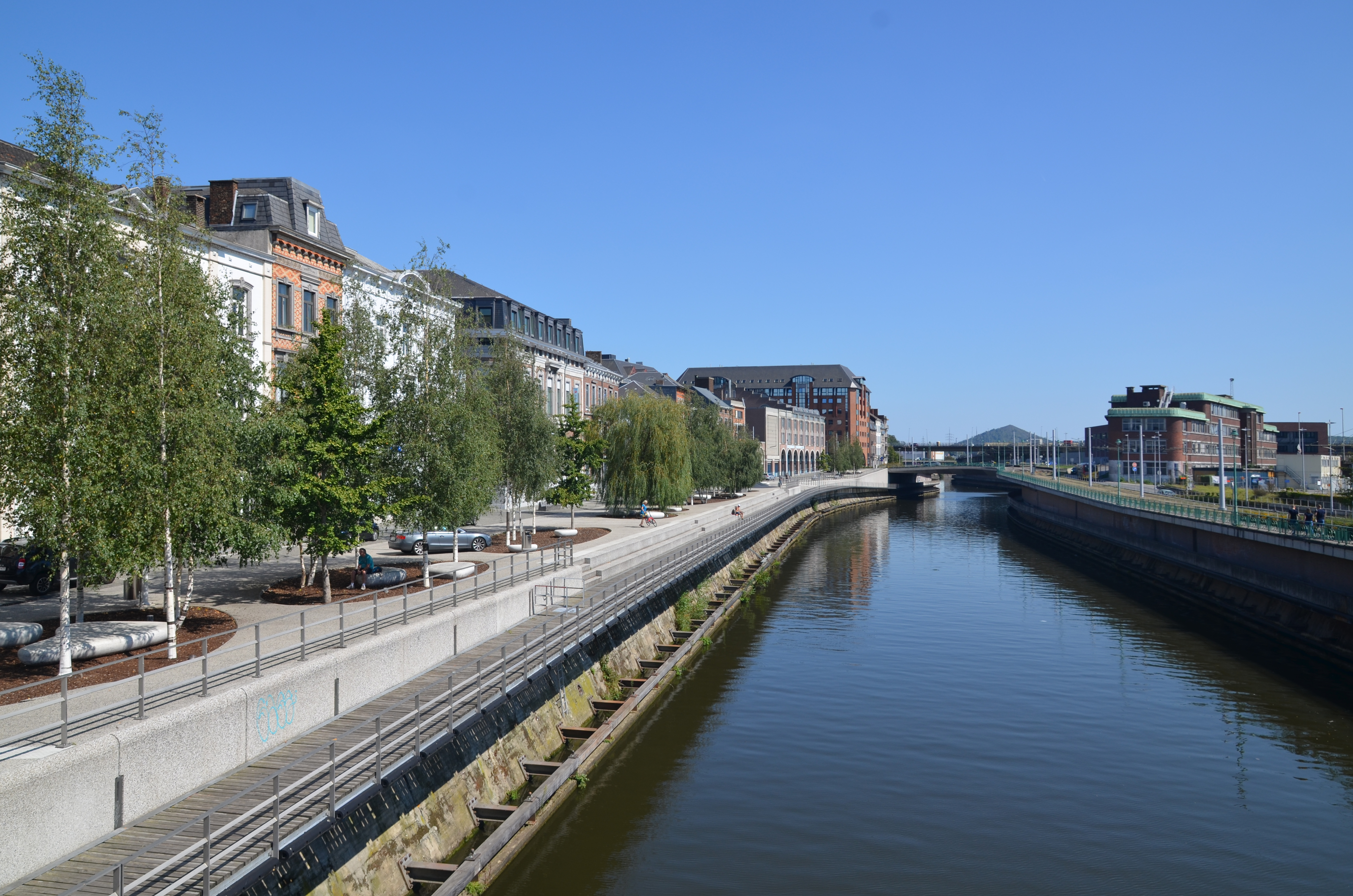
- Clockwise from top: Charleroi's Town Hall; St. Christopher's Church on the Place Vauban; the Place Verte; the Sambre; the Golden House; and the Castle of Monceau-sur-Sambre

- Flag Coat of arms
- Interactive map of Charleroi
- Location in Belgium Charleroi (Europe)
- Coordinates: 50°24′29″N 4°26′51″E
- Country: Belgium
- Community: French Community
- Region: Wallonia
- Province: Hainaut
- Arrondissement: Charleroi

Government
  - Mayor: Thomas Dermine (PS)
  - Governing parties: PS, Les Engagés

Area
  - Total: 102.95 km^{2} (39.75 sq mi)
- Elevation: 109 m (359 ft)

Population (2022-01-01)
  - Total: 202,421
  - Density: 1,966.2/km^{2} (5,092.5/sq mi)
- Time zone: UTC+01:00 (CET)
  - Summer (DST): UTC+02:00 (CEST)
- Postal codes: 6000, 6001, 6010, 6020, 6030–6032, 6040–6044, 6060, 6061
- NIS code: 52011
- Area codes: 071
- Website: www.charleroi.be

Charleroi (UK: /ˈʃɑːrlə.rwʌ/, US: /-rɔɪ, -rwɑː/; French: [ʃaʁləʁwa]; Walloon: Tchålerwè [tʃɑːlɛʀwɛ]) is a city and a municipality of Wallonia, located in the province of Hainaut, Belgium. It is the largest city in both Hainaut and Wallonia. The city is situated in the valley of the Sambre, in the south-west of Belgium, not far from the border with France. By 1 January 2008, the total population of Charleroi was 201,593. The metropolitan area, including the outer commuter zone, covers an area of 1,462 square kilometres (564 sq mi) with a total population of 522,522 by 1 January 2008, ranking it as the 5th most populous in Belgium after Brussels, Antwerp, Liège, and Ghent. The inhabitants are called Carolorégiens or simply Carolos.

== History ==
The Charleroi area was already settled in the prehistoric period, with traces of metallurgical and commercial activities along the Sambre. Several public buildings, temples and villas were built in the area in the Roman period. Burial places, with jewels and weapons, have been found. The first written mention of a place called Charnoy dates from a 9th-century offering in the Lobbes abbey, which lists various neighboring towns and related tithe duties. During the Middle Ages, Charnoy was one of the many small hamlets in the area, with no more than about 50 inhabitants, part of the County of Namur.

=== Foundation ===
Spanish territorial losses in the 1659 Treaty of the Pyrenees left a gap between the key fortresses of Mons and Namur; to fill this, Francisco Castel Rodrigo, then Governor of the Spanish Netherlands, expropriated land around Charnoy to build a fortress near the Sambre. In September 1666, it was renamed Charle-roi, or King Charles, in honour of five-year-old Charles II of Spain; the chronogram FVNDATVR CAROLOREGIVM (MDCLVVVI) can be found in the register of the parish of Charnoy.

Construction had only just begun when the War of Devolution with France began in 1667, and the Spanish withdrew. France retained the town under the 1668 Treaty of Aix-la-Chapelle, and its fortifications were completed by Vauban. A bridge was built over the Sambre, connecting the Ville Haute and Ville Basse, with incentives offered to persuade people to settle there. The French relinquished control in 1678, and although it changed hands several times over the next 50 years, the town remained part of the Netherlands until the foundation of modern Belgium.

=== 1666–1830 ===
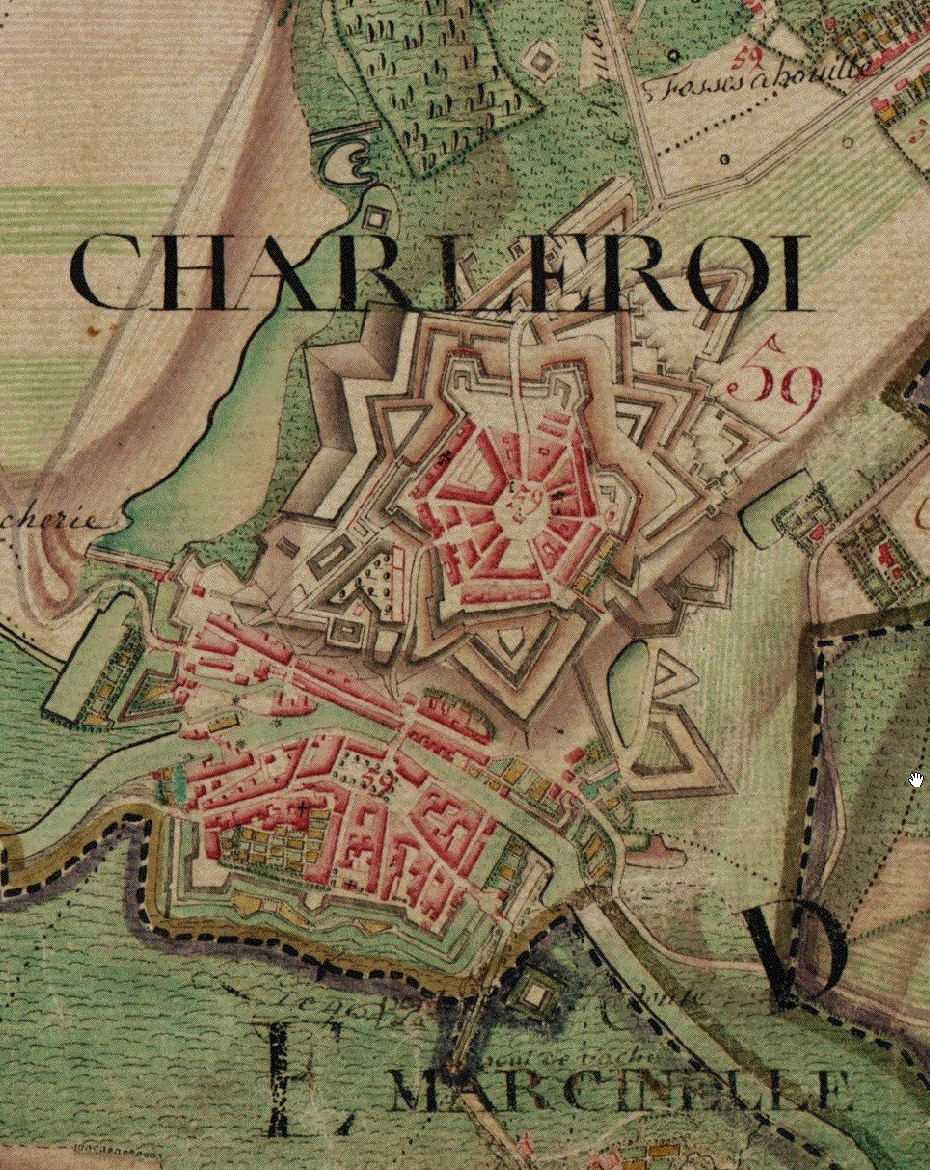
Map of Charleroi in 1770s

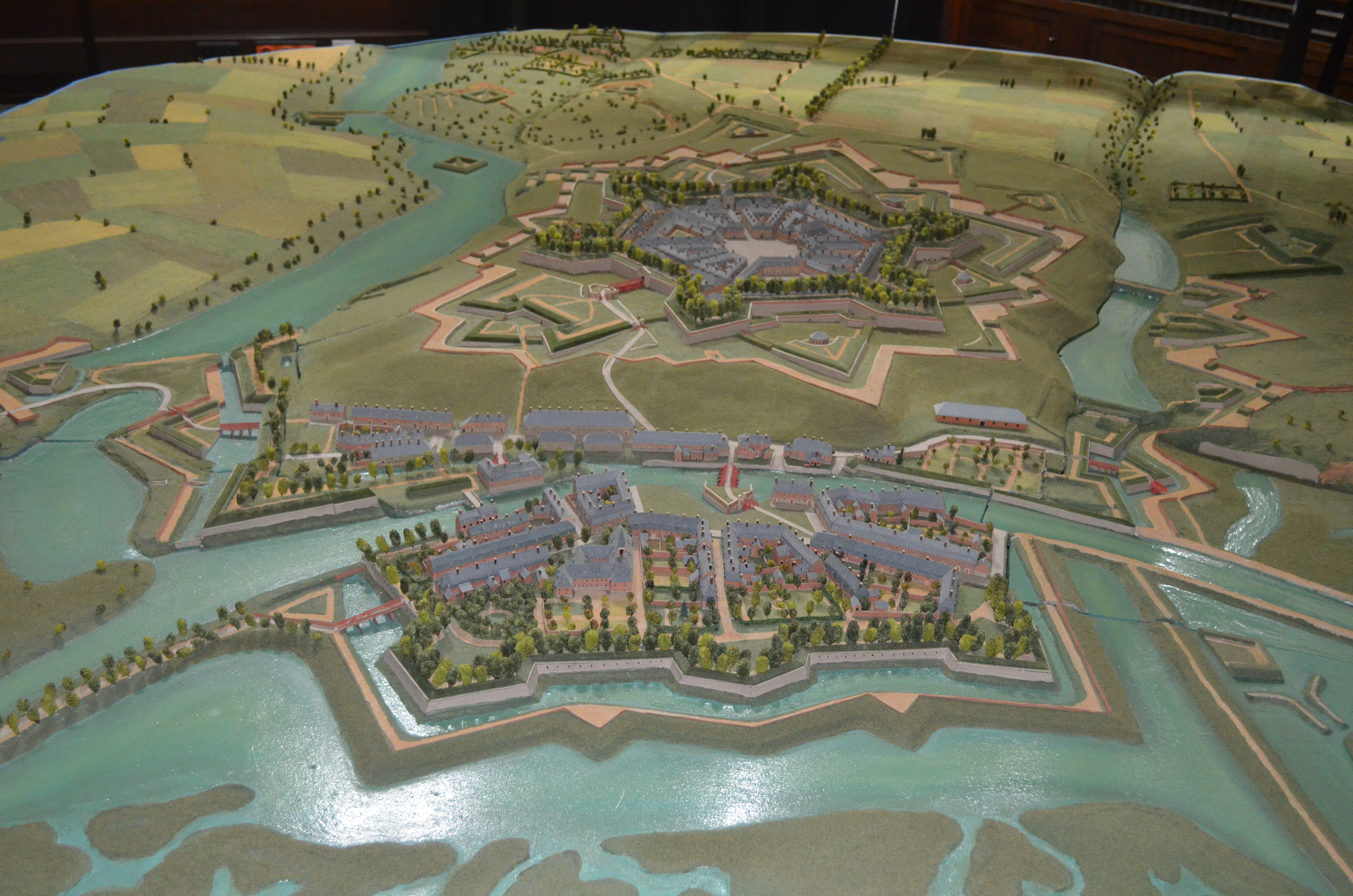
Copy of the plan-relief of Charleroi made in 1696. View from the south. On display at the Town Hall.

Shortly after its foundation, the new city was in turn besieged by the Dutch, ceded to the Spanish in 1678 (Treaty of Nijmegen), taken by the French in 1693, ceded again to the Spanish in 1698 (Treaty of Rijswijk), then taken by the French, the Dutch and the Austrians in 1714 (Treaty of Baden). The French Prince of Conti took the city again in 1745, but it was ceded back to Austria in 1748, beginning a period of prosperity under Joseph II. Glass, steel and coal industries, which had already sprung up a century earlier, could now flourish.

Trouble began again in 1790, the year of the civil uprising that eventually led to the United States of Belgium. The Austrians occupied the city, were forced out by the French after the Battle of Jemappes on 6 November 1792, and took it back again four months later. On 12 June 1794, the French revolutionary Army of Sambre-et-Meuse under the command of Jean-Baptiste Jourdan, invested Charleroi and won a decisive victory in the ensuing Battle of Fleurus. The city took the revolutionary name of Libre-sur-Sambre until 1800. After France's defeat in 1814, the whole area was annexed to the Netherlands, and new walls were built around the city. Napoleon stayed in Charleroi for a couple of days in June 1815, just before the Battle of Waterloo.

=== 1830 to present ===
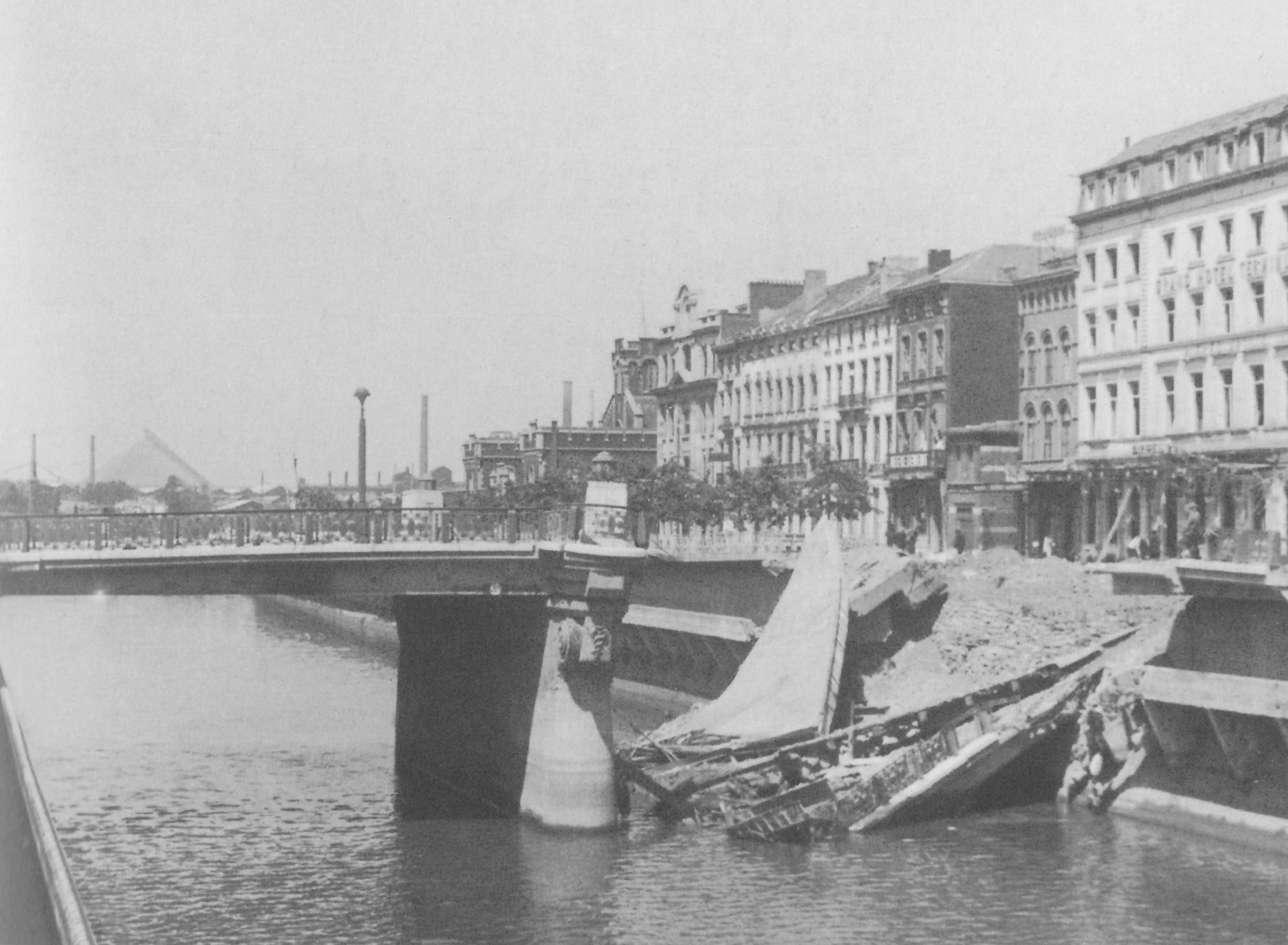
The station bridge partially collapsed in May 1940 under the effect of French army explosives

The Belgian Revolution of 1830 gave the area its freedom from the Netherlands and ushered in a new era of prosperity, still based mostly on glass, metallurgy and coal, hence the area's name, Pays Noir ("Black Country"). After the Industrial Revolution, Charleroi benefited from the increased use of coke in the metallurgical industry. People from across Europe were attracted by the economic opportunities, and the population grew rapidly.

Following the Industrial Revolution in Wallonia, Charleroi from the 1850s–1860s became one of the most important places where labor strikes broke out. In 1886, 12 strikers were killed by the Belgian army in Roux. In the 1880s, miners in Hainaut were recruited by the Dominion Coal Company in Glace Bay, Nova Scotia. These miners were anxious to flee the repression following bloody strikes and riots in Liège and Charleroi during the Walloon Jacquerie of 1886. Walloon miners from Charleroi also emigrated to Alberta, Canada. The working men of Charleroi always played an important role in Belgian general strikes and particularly during the Belgian general strike of 1936, the general strike against Leopold III of Belgium, and the 1960–1961 winter general strike.

By 1871, the fortified walls around the city were completely torn down.

Heavy fighting took place during World War I due to the city's strategic location on the Sambre. The city was badly damaged with further destruction only being prevented by the Couillet Treaty agreed with the German forces which required the payment of 10 million Belgian Francs, foodstuffs, vehicles and armaments. The magazine Spirou, which featured the popular cartoon characters Lucky Luke and the Smurfs, was launched by the publishing company Éditions Dupuis in 1938. After World War II, Charleroi witnessed a general decline of its heavy industry. Following the merger with several surrounding municipalities in 1977, the city as of 2013 ranks as the largest city in Wallonia and the fourth-largest in Belgium.

=== Logotype ===
As part of the effort to improve its identity, the city adopted a new logo and graphic charter in early 2015, designed by the Brussels studio Pam and Jenny.

The crown of three triangles above the C has several meanings:

- The triangular shape evokes the slag heaps, yesterday black and today green, which symbolise the city's industrial past and its factories.
- It also recalls the crest of the cockerel designed by Pierre Paulus and symbol of Wallonia.
- The crown refers to King Charles II who gave his name to the city at the time of its foundation.
- The typography used is also very similar to that used in the logo of ACEC, a historic company founded, developed and finally closed down in Charleroi in 1989 after more than a century of existence.
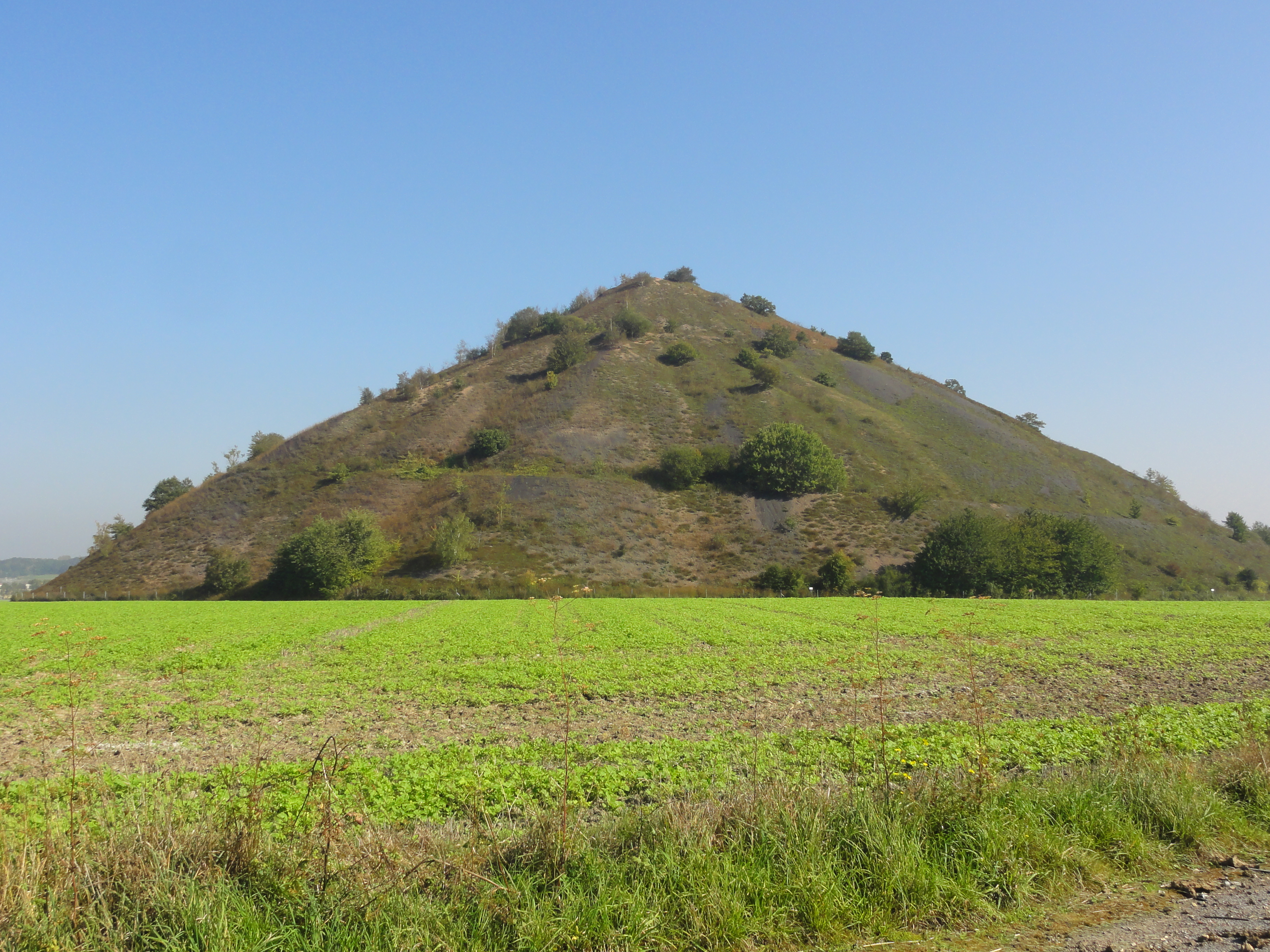
Slag heap

Flag of Wallonia

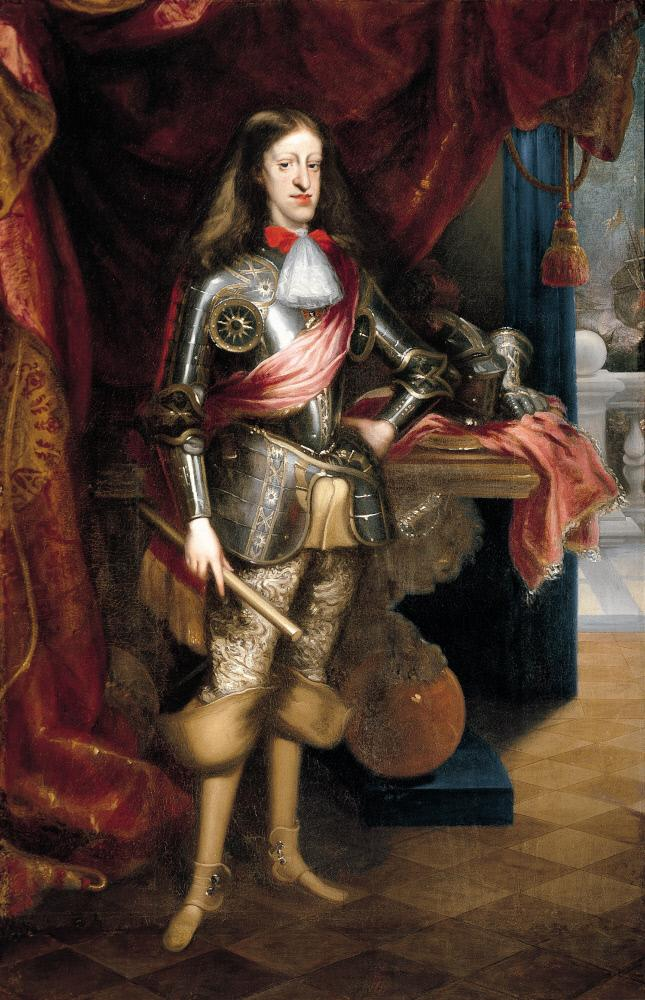
King Charles II

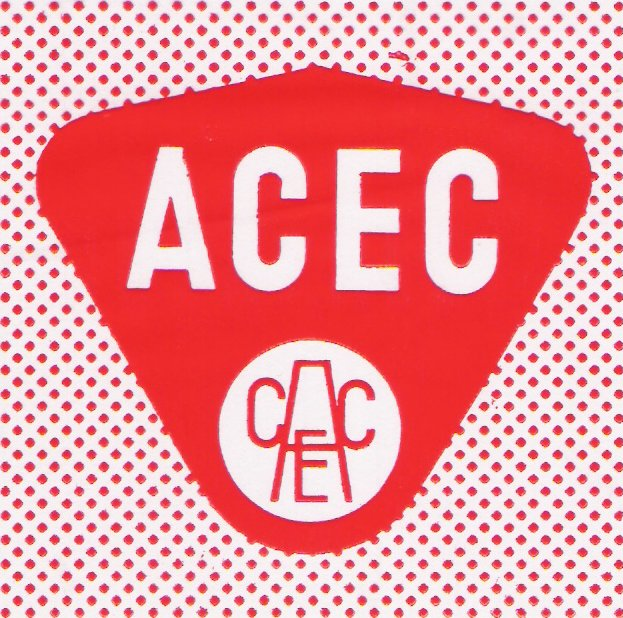
Typography

== Geography ==
The 15 districts of Charleroi, in Roman numerals, with the surrounding municipalities labelled with letters

The municipality of Charleroi straddles both banks of the river Sambre in an area marked by industrial activities (coal mining and steel industry), which has been nicknamed the Pays Noir ("Black Country"), part of the larger sillon industriel. Even though most of the factories have closed since the 1950s, the landscape remains dotted with spoil tips and old industrial buildings.

Charleroi lies around 50 kilometres (31 mi) south of Brussels.

The municipality comprises:

- I. the central district of Charleroi

and the following former municipalities, now sections, merged into Charleroi in 1977:

- II. Dampremy
- III. Lodelinsart
- IV. Gilly
- V. Montignies-sur-Sambre
- VI. Couillet
- VII. Marcinelle
- VIII. Mont-sur-Marchienne
- IX. Marchienne-au-Pont
- X. Monceau-sur-Sambre
- XI. Goutroux
- XII. Roux
- XIII. Jumet
- XIV. Gosselies
- XV. Ransart

Neighboring municipalities:

- a. Les Bons Villers
- b. Fleurus
- c. Châtelet
- d. Gerpinnes
- e. Ham-sur-Heure-Nalinnes
- f. Montigny-le-Tilleul
- g. Fontaine-l'Évêque
- h. Courcelles
- i. Pont-à-Celles

=== Topography and hydrography ===
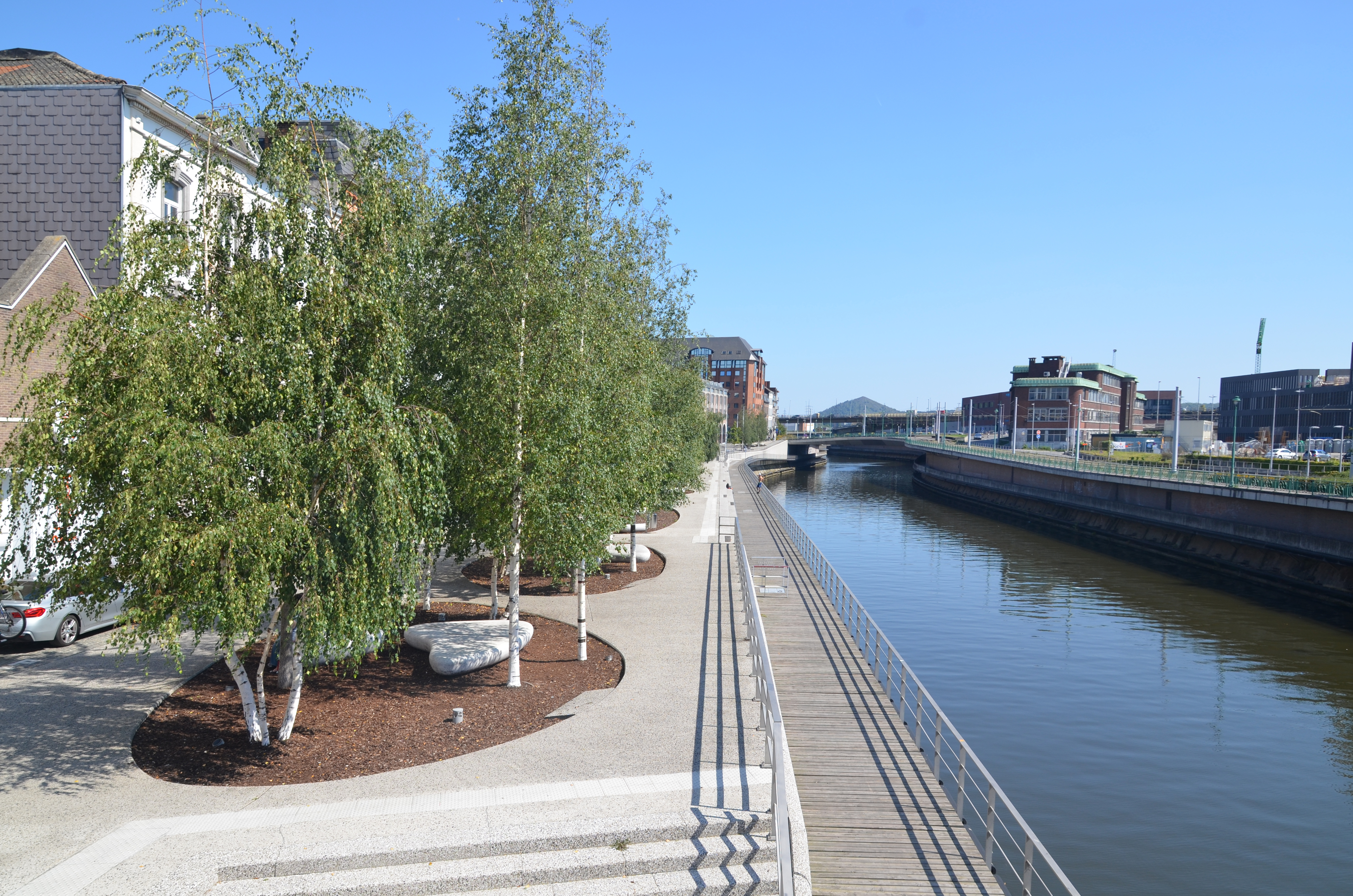
The Quai Arthur Rimbaud (formerly Quai de Brabant) along the Sambre after renovation

The topography of Charleroi is influenced by the valley of the river Sambre, which flows from west to east before joining the Meuse at Namur. The Piéton river flows from north to south to join the Sambre at Dampremy. The Charleroi-Brussels canal is dug in the valley of this stream. The Eau d'Heure river comes from the south and also flows into the Sambre at Marchienne-au-Pont. About twenty streams run through the territory of the municipality.

The altitude ranges from 100 metres (Sambre and Piéton valleys) to over 220 metres at the Bois du Prince in Marcinelle. The level is 132 metres on the Place Charles II. The height of the slag heaps often exceeds 200 metres, the Saint-Charles slag heap in the Bois du Cazier reaches 241 metres.

=== Biodiversity ===
The six slag heaps in the Pays Noir are reservoirs of biodiversity that should be preserved.

Like the calcareous grassland, the slag heaps are habitats created by human activity that are home to many very specific and often threatened animal and plant species. The rarity of these species depends on the rarity of the environment itself (the biotope). Biodiversity is also present in other environments: in a wasteland, a body of water, a meadow, etc. In terms of biodiversity, it is therefore preferable to maintain a mosaic of habitats, hence the interest in preserving different types of environments on the slag heaps.

The Viviers site, for example, is an old mining site located in the east of Charleroi (Gilly). This site has a small conical slag heap and large open areas consisting mainly of pioneer grassland and wasteland. It also includes a small body of water as well as temporary ponds, and some wooded areas on the western and northern edges. This particular biotope is of great biological interest and acts as a refuge for a diverse fauna. The vast reed bed surrounding the pond is home to the red warbler, a passerine bird specific to this type of vegetation. Several species of amphibians can be seen here, including a population of the natterjack toad, as well as certain insects, such as the magnificent blue-winged grasshopper.

The Martinet site, a former colliery on the boundary of the Monceau-sur-Sambre and Roux sections, is in the process of being rehabilitated and reallocated. Like the Viviers slag heap in Gilly, this vast site is of great biological interest.

=== Climate ===
Similar to the rest of Belgium Charleroi has an oceanic climate as a result of the Gulf Stream influence warming winters, while also moderating summer warmth in spite of its inland position.

Climate data for Charleroi (1991–2020 normals)
Month	Jan	Feb	Mar	Apr	May	Jun	Jul	Aug	Sep	Oct	Nov	Dec	Year
Record high °C (°F)	15.2 (59.4)	19.5 (67.1)	23.9 (75.0)	28.7 (83.7)	31.8 (89.2)	34.4 (93.9)	40.4 (104.7)	36.6 (97.9)	35.4 (95.7)	26.0 (78.8)	20.4 (68.7)	16.7 (62.1)	40.4 (104.7)
Mean daily maximum °C (°F)	5.8 (42.4)	6.9 (44.4)	10.7 (51.3)	14.8 (58.6)	18.4 (65.1)	21.4 (70.5)	23.6 (74.5)	23.4 (74.1)	19.6 (67.3)	14.8 (58.6)	9.6 (49.3)	6.3 (43.3)	14.6 (58.3)
Daily mean °C (°F)	3.2 (37.8)	3.7 (38.7)	6.5 (43.7)	9.7 (49.5)	13.4 (56.1)	16.4 (61.5)	18.5 (65.3)	18.2 (64.8)	14.9 (58.8)	11.0 (51.8)	6.8 (44.2)	3.8 (38.8)	10.5 (50.9)
Mean daily minimum °C (°F)	0.6 (33.1)	0.6 (33.1)	2.4 (36.3)	4.7 (40.5)	8.4 (47.1)	11.3 (52.3)	13.4 (56.1)	13.1 (55.6)	10.1 (50.2)	7.2 (45.0)	3.9 (39.0)	1.4 (34.5)	6.4 (43.6)
Record low °C (°F)	−17.5 (0.5)	−16.7 (1.9)	−10.1 (13.8)	−5.5 (22.1)	0.1 (32.2)	3.7 (38.7)	5.6 (42.1)	6.0 (42.8)	2.9 (37.2)	−5.3 (22.5)	−8.7 (16.3)	−11.8 (10.8)	−17.5 (0.5)
Average precipitation mm (inches)	79.7 (3.14)	69.9 (2.75)	65.5 (2.58)	47.9 (1.89)	65.1 (2.56)	76.0 (2.99)	75.6 (2.98)	85.6 (3.37)	63.3 (2.49)	67.1 (2.64)	75.7 (2.98)	98.3 (3.87)	869.7 (34.24)
Average precipitation days (≥ 1 mm)	12.8	11.6	11.3	9.1	10.2	10.2	10.2	10.3	9.6	10.6	12.1	14.4	132.4
Mean monthly sunshine hours	55	73	126	178	204	208	217	206	157	114	64	47	1,649
Source 1: Royal Meteorological Institute
Source 2: Infoclimat

== Politics ==
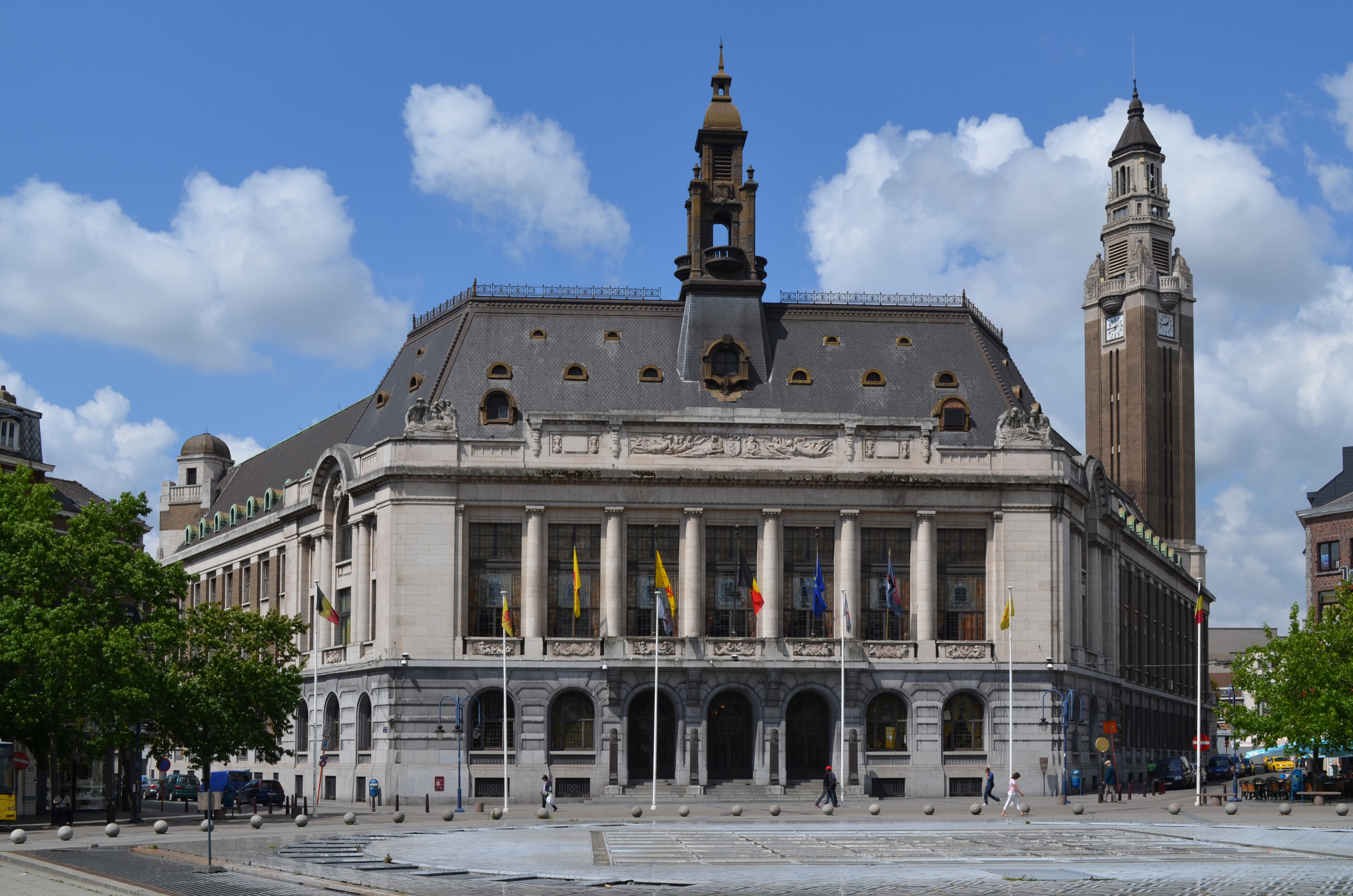
Charleroi's Town Hall

Before the merger of municipalities, from Belgian independence in 1830 until 1 January 1977 (with the exception of the period linked to the Second World War), Charleroi only experienced liberal mayors and majorities. The municipal elections in 1976, just before the merger of municipalities, brought an absolute majority for the Socialist Party (Parti Socialiste or PS), and Lucien Harmegnies, previous minister and until then mayor of Marcinelle, became the first socialist mayor of the new entity. Since 1977, the Socialist Party has constantly been part of the political majority within the municipal council, either holding an absolute majority or being in coalition with other parties.

In 2005, numerous judicial affairs put into question Charleroi's elected socialist municipal councillors. The media resonance and the impact were significant at local, regional and even national level. At local level, the PS lost its absolute majority as a result of the municipality elections of 8 October 2006.

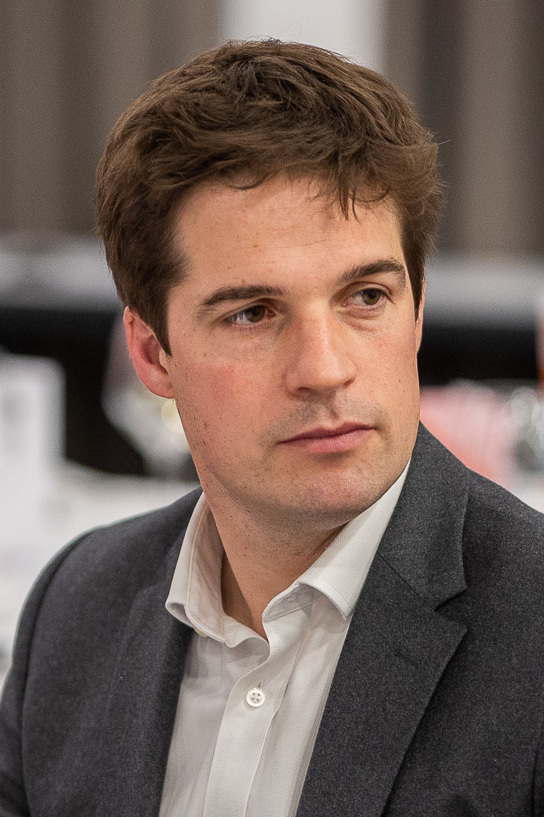
Thomas Dermine, mayor of Charleroi since 2024

At the elections of October 2012, the PS, under the leadership of Paul Magnette, regained the absolute majority at the municipal council. Mayor Paul Magnette chose, however, to open the socialist majority and to reconduct the coalition of socialists, liberals and centrists. At the municipal elections of 2018, Magnette, re-elected mayor, opened the socialist city majority to ecologists and centrists (C+).

=== Municipal elections ===
Party	2000 (%)	2006 (%)	2012 (%)	2018 (%)
Socialist Party (Parti Socialiste)	51.4	38.4	47.7	41.3
Reformist Movement (Mouvement Réformateur)	16.1	24.6	16.3	11.2
Humanist Democratic Centre (Centre Démocrate Humaniste)	9.6	14.4	10.6	7.61^{(*)}
National Front (Front National)	6.9	9.5	5.8^{(**)}	/
Ecolo	11.4	8.1	7.4	7.4
PTB/PTB+	1.3	2.1	3.4	15.7
DéFI	/	/	1.8	5.2

(*)Under the local list name "C+" (**)Under alternative name

== Landmarks ==
- The belfry, part of the City Hall, was inscribed on the UNESCO World Heritage List in 1999 as part of the Belfries of Belgium and France site.
- The Maison Dorée was built in 1899 by Art Nouveau architect Alfred Frère. Its name is derived from the golden sgraffiti that adorn the façade.
- The city is home to several museums of fine art, glass and other disciplines, as well as a significant one specializing in photography, in the Mont-sur-Marchienne district.
- Castle of Monceau-sur-Sambre : set into a large English style park, high building flanked by circular towers, dating mainly from the seventeenth and eighteenth century.
- St. Christopher's Church (Charleroi Ville-Haute) : construction started in 1667 under the reign of Louis XIV. The church has been several times restored and transformed in a modern-style architecture in 1956.
- St. Antoine's Church (Charleroi Ville-Basse) : it was inaugurated in 1830 in a neoclassical style, its architect is Jean Kuypers.
- The Protestant Church of Belgium (Charleroi Ville-Haute) : the church has held English-speaking (Anglican) services since 1933. Episcopal services in English continue on the second and fourth Sundays of the month until the present day.
- Former hôtel des Postes (Charleroi Ville-Basse) : building with a belfry in Flemish neo-renaissance style on the place Verte constructed in 1907.
- The Caserne Caporal Trésignies (Charleroi Ville-Basse) : Former Gothic Revival Infantry Barracks, now houses the Museum of the Chasseurs à pied.
- Monument to the Martyrs (Charleroi Ville-Haute) : a neoclassical memorial inaugurated in 1923, honoring the memory of the victims of both world wars.
- Eden (Charleroi Ville-Haute) : The building was built by Auguste Cador towards the end of the 19th century.
- In remembrance to the Jews of Charleroi being murdered by the Nazi regime, the German artist Gunter Demnig has collocated nine Stolpersteine in Charleroi.
- Bois du Cazier (Marcinelle) : coal mining dating from the nineteenth century inscribed in 2012 on the UNESCO World Heritage List. A museum of industry and glassware is located in the buildings of the industrial era.
- The Passage de la Bourse (Charleroi Ville-Basse) : is a commercial gallery inaugurated in 1892 in a mixture of neoclassical and Flemish neo-Renaissance styles.
- The Tour Bleue ("Blue Tower"), located in the centre of Charleroi and 75 m high. Realised in 2015 by Jean Nouvel, it is the headquarters of the Police.
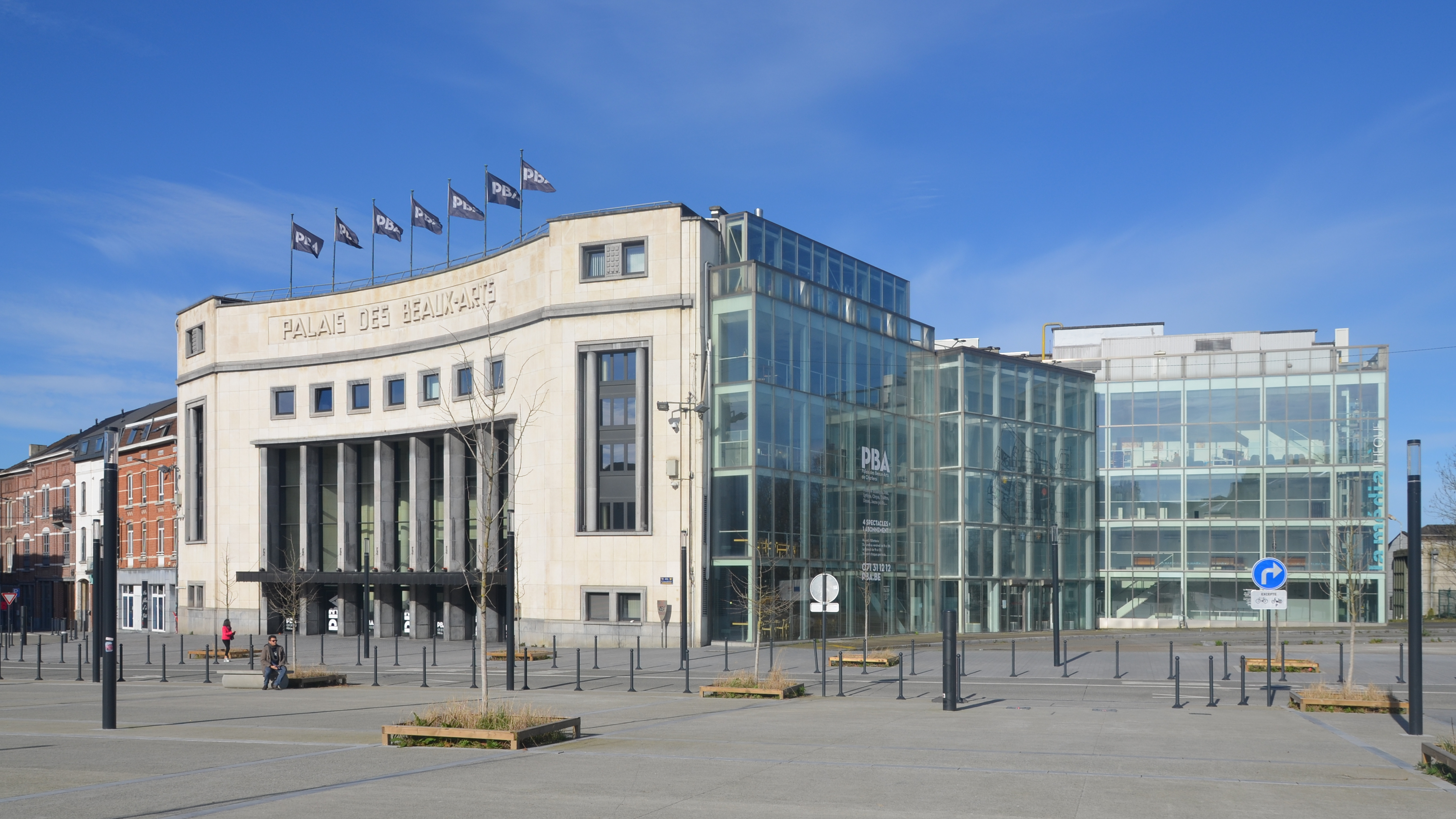
Palais des Beaux-Arts

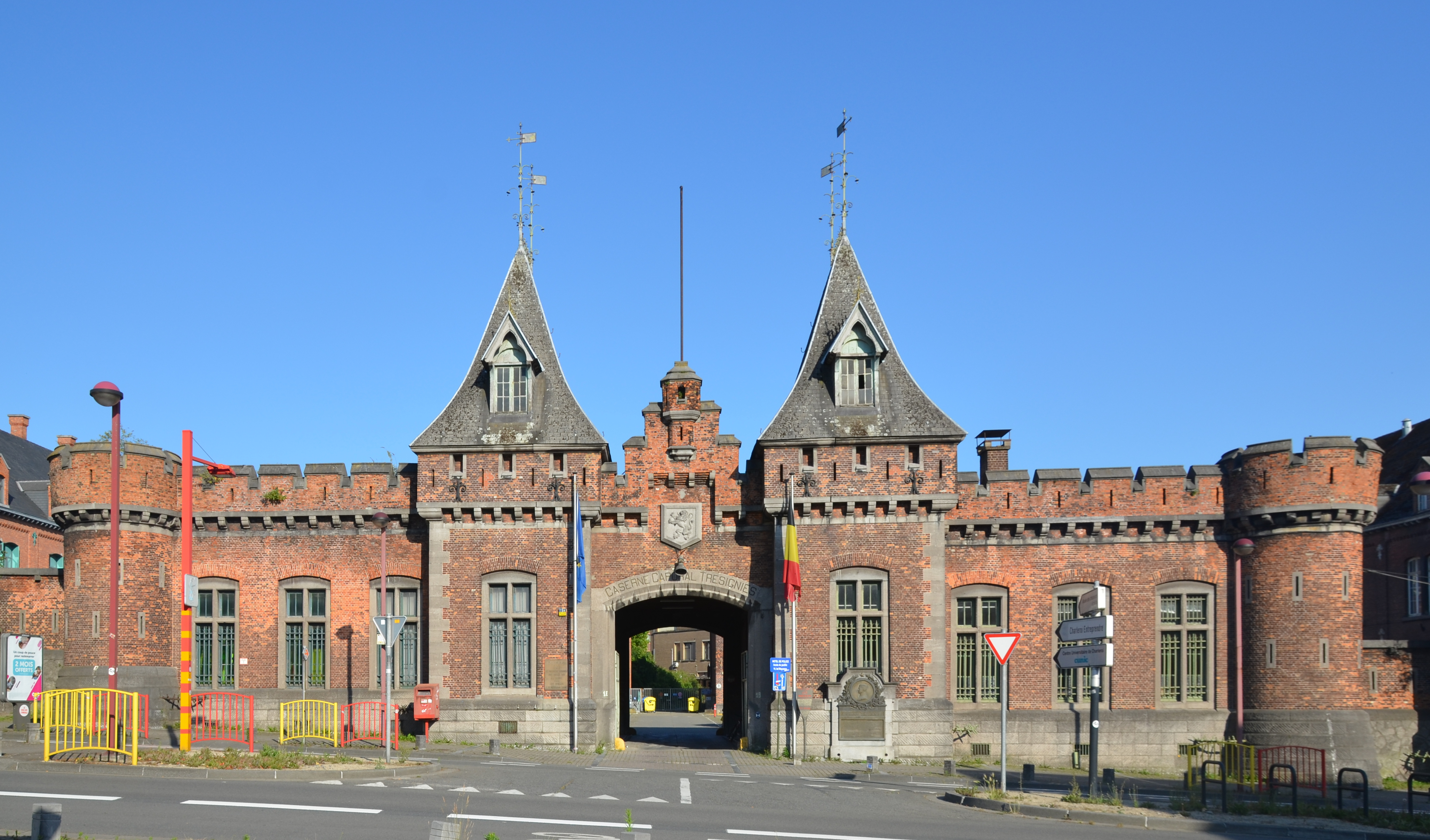
Caserne Caporal Trésignies

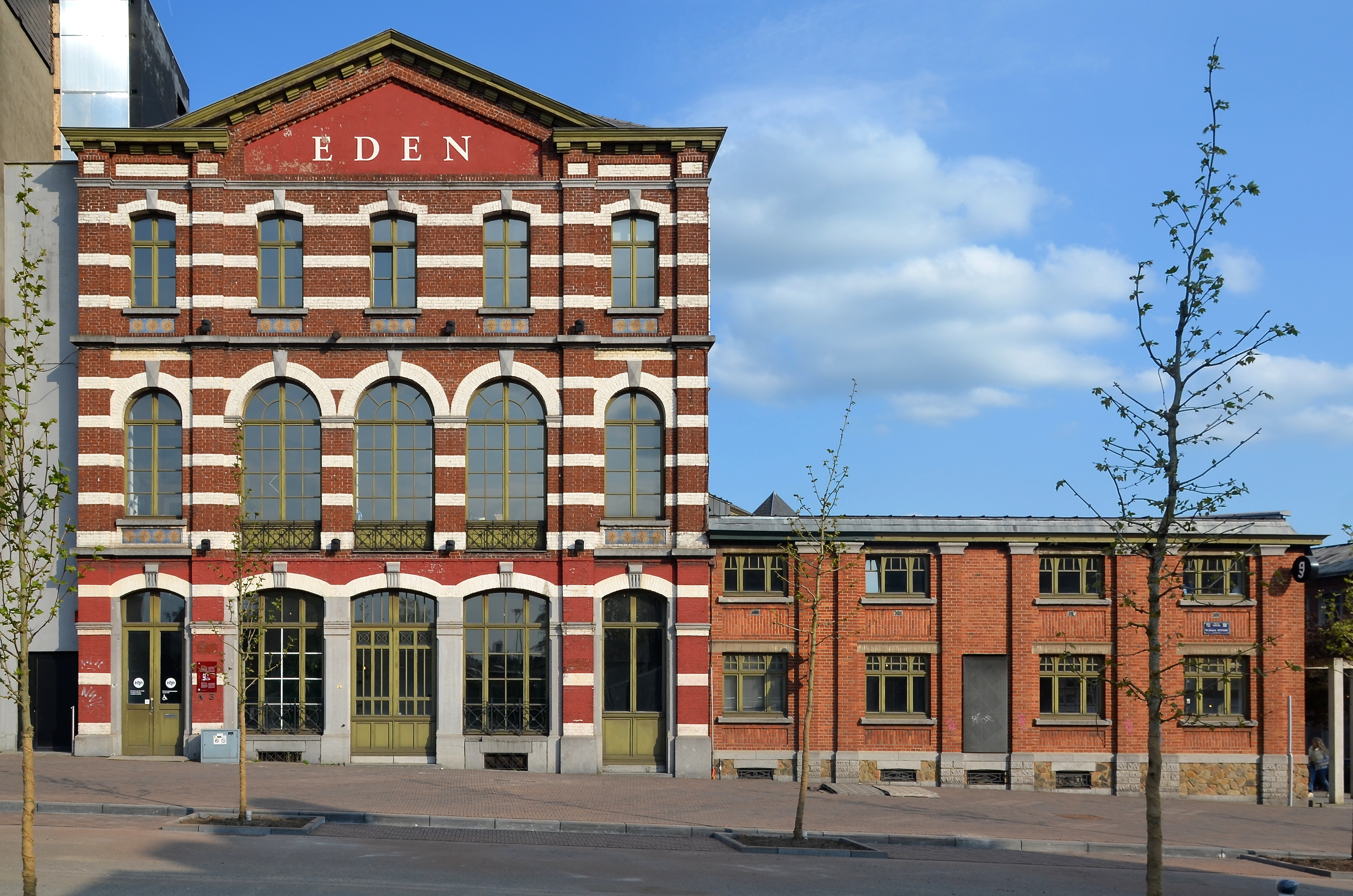
Eden theater

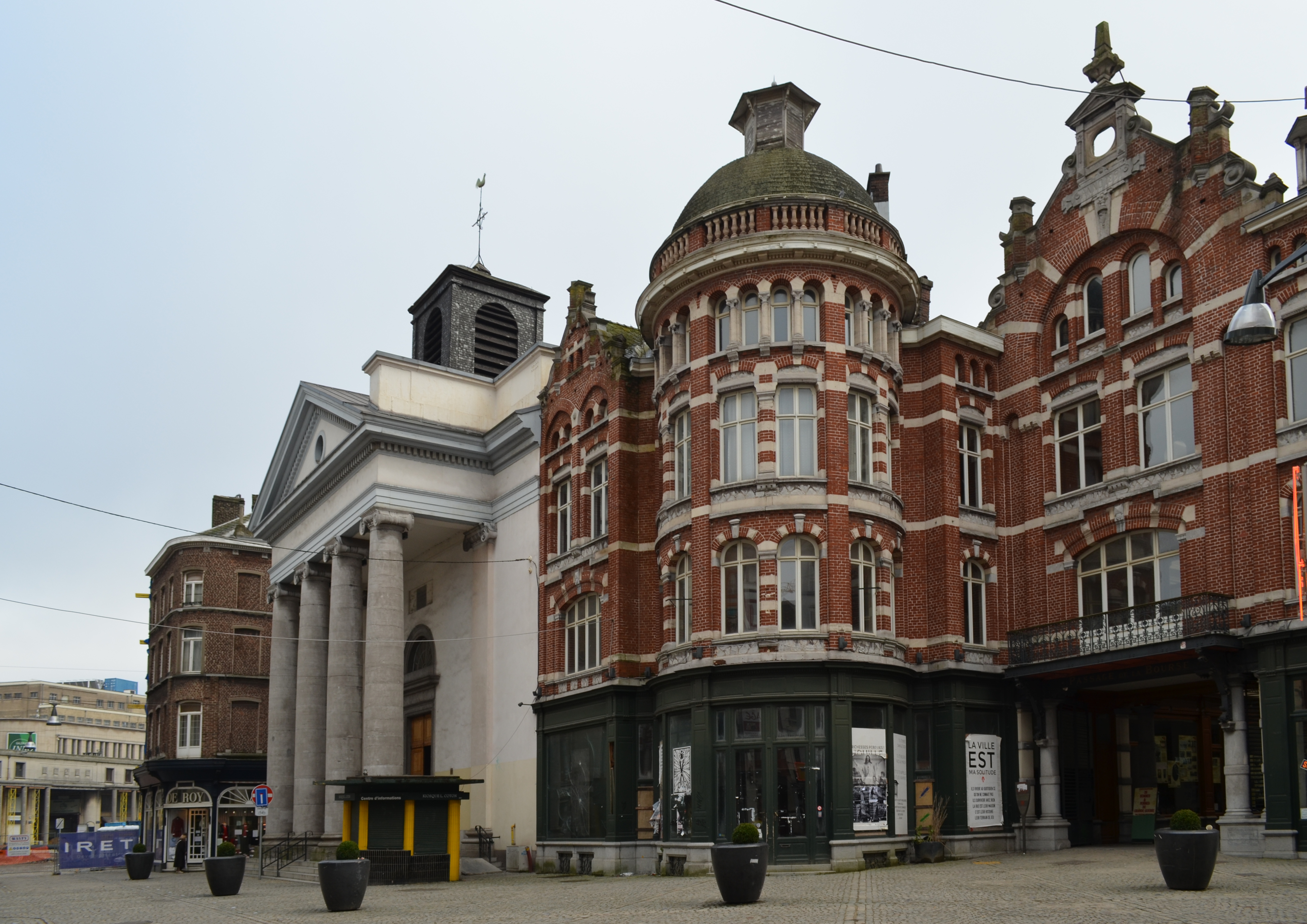
St. Antoine's Church (left) with the Passage de la Bourse (right)

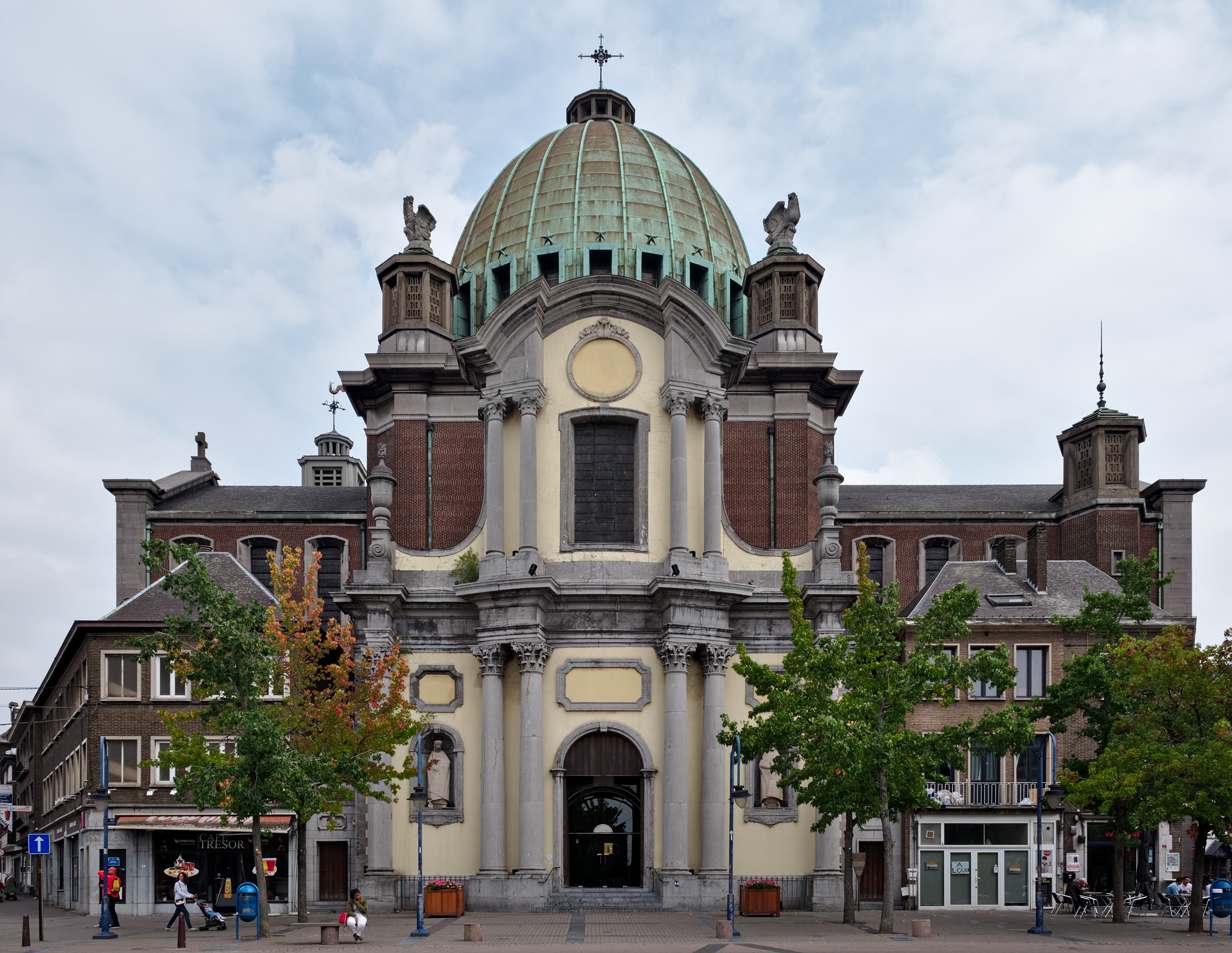
St. Christopher's Church

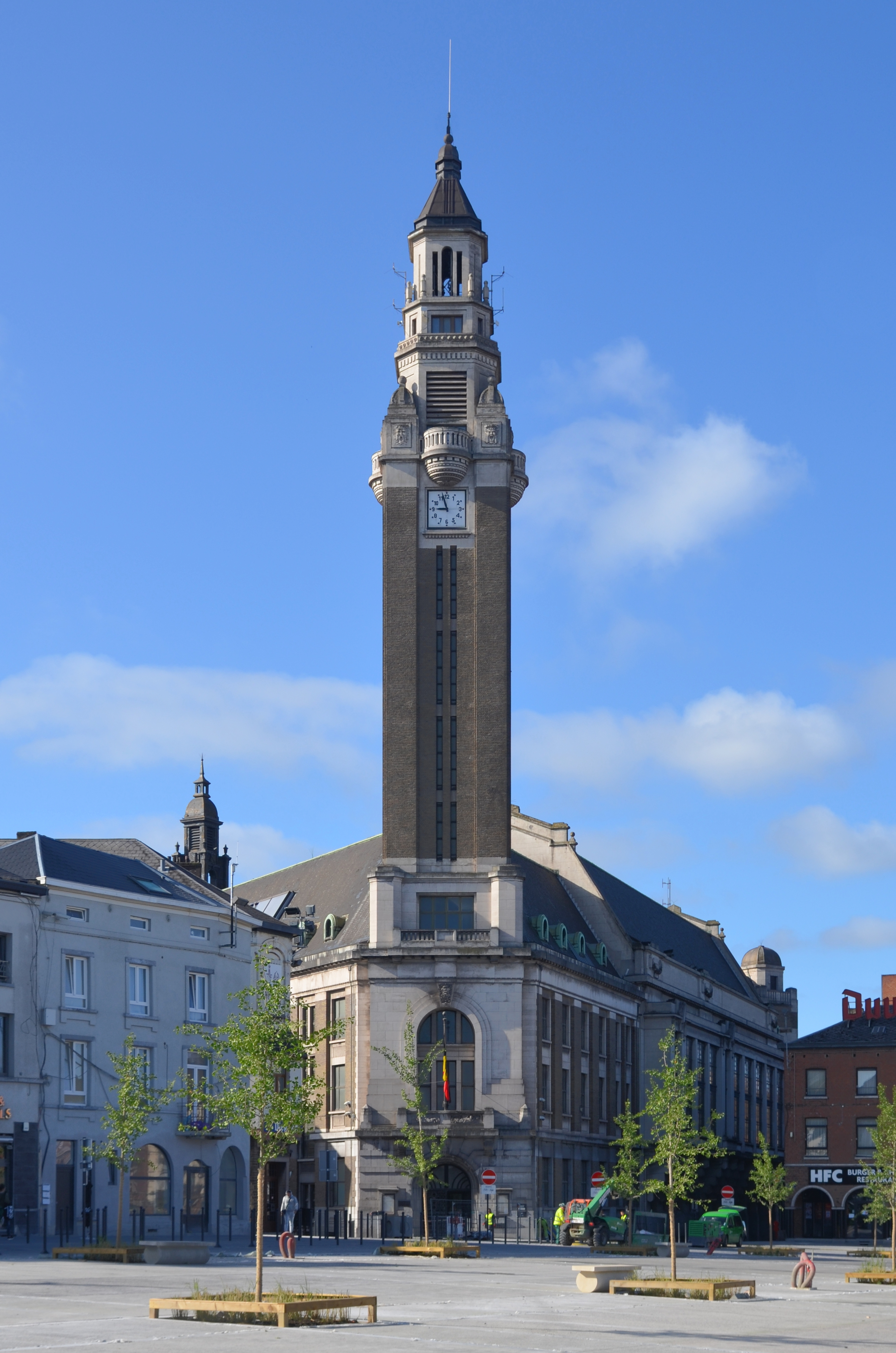
The belfry in front of the Place du Manège

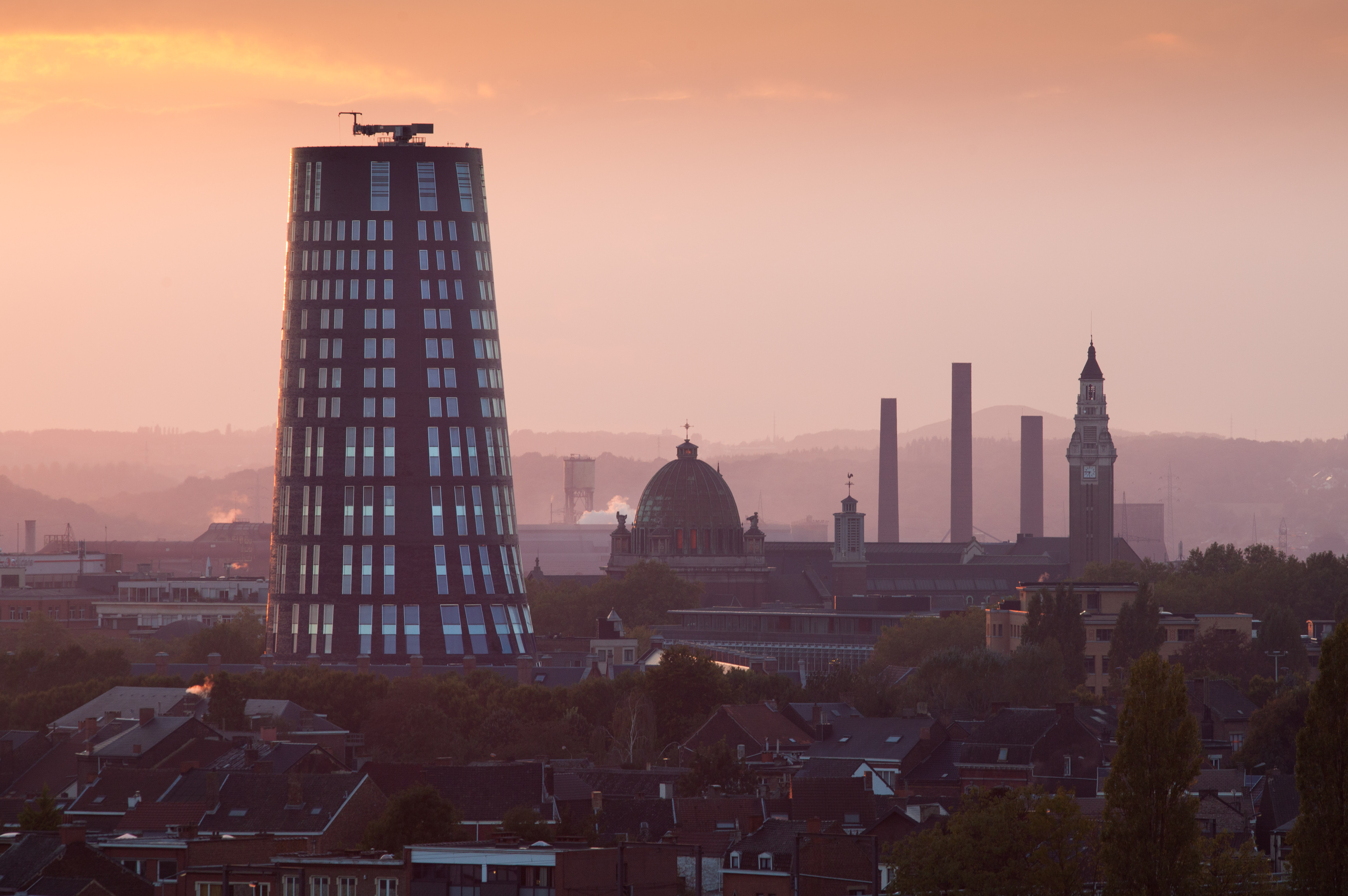
The Tour Bleue in the Charleroi skyline

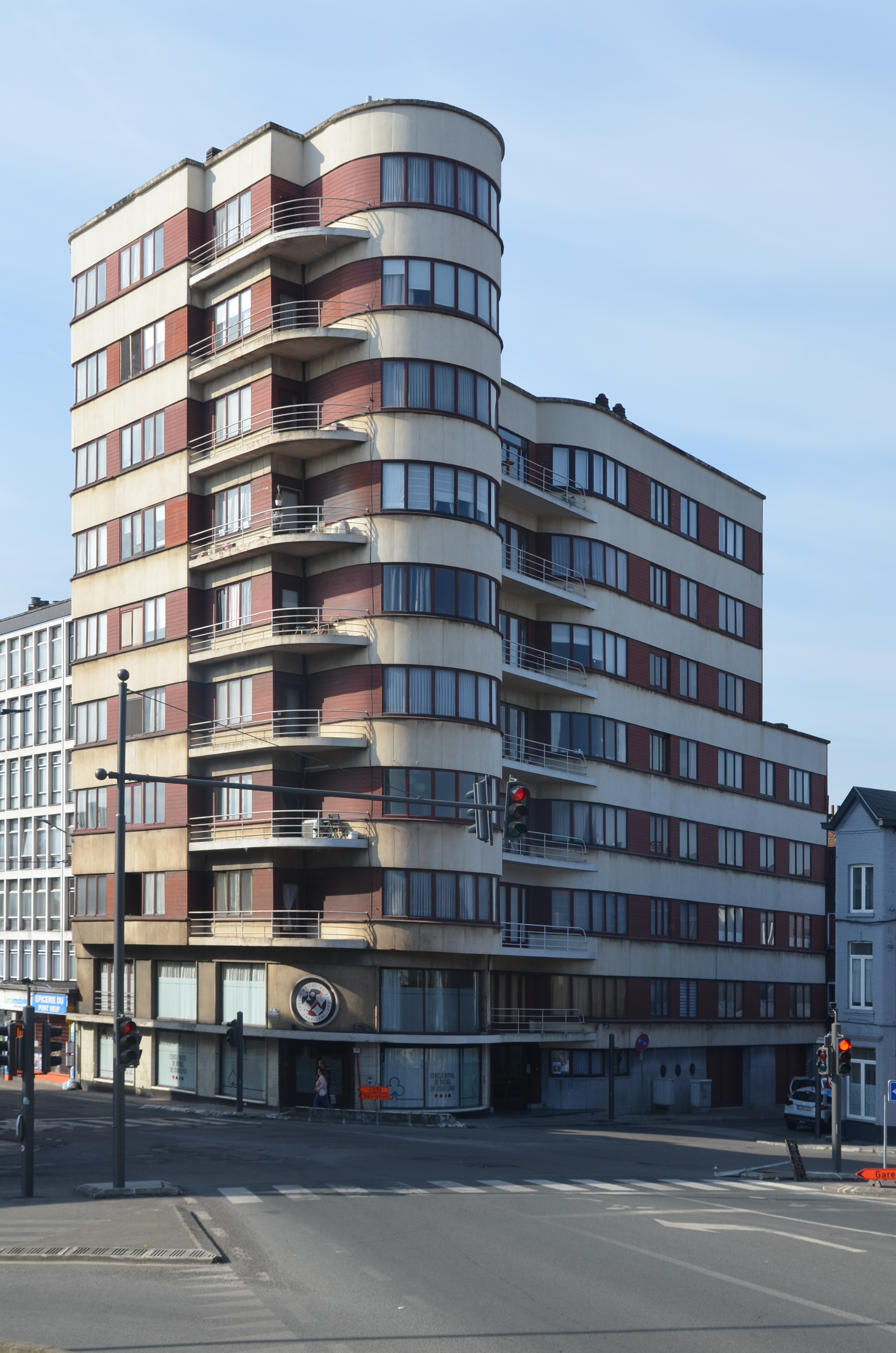
Résidence Albert

== Economy ==
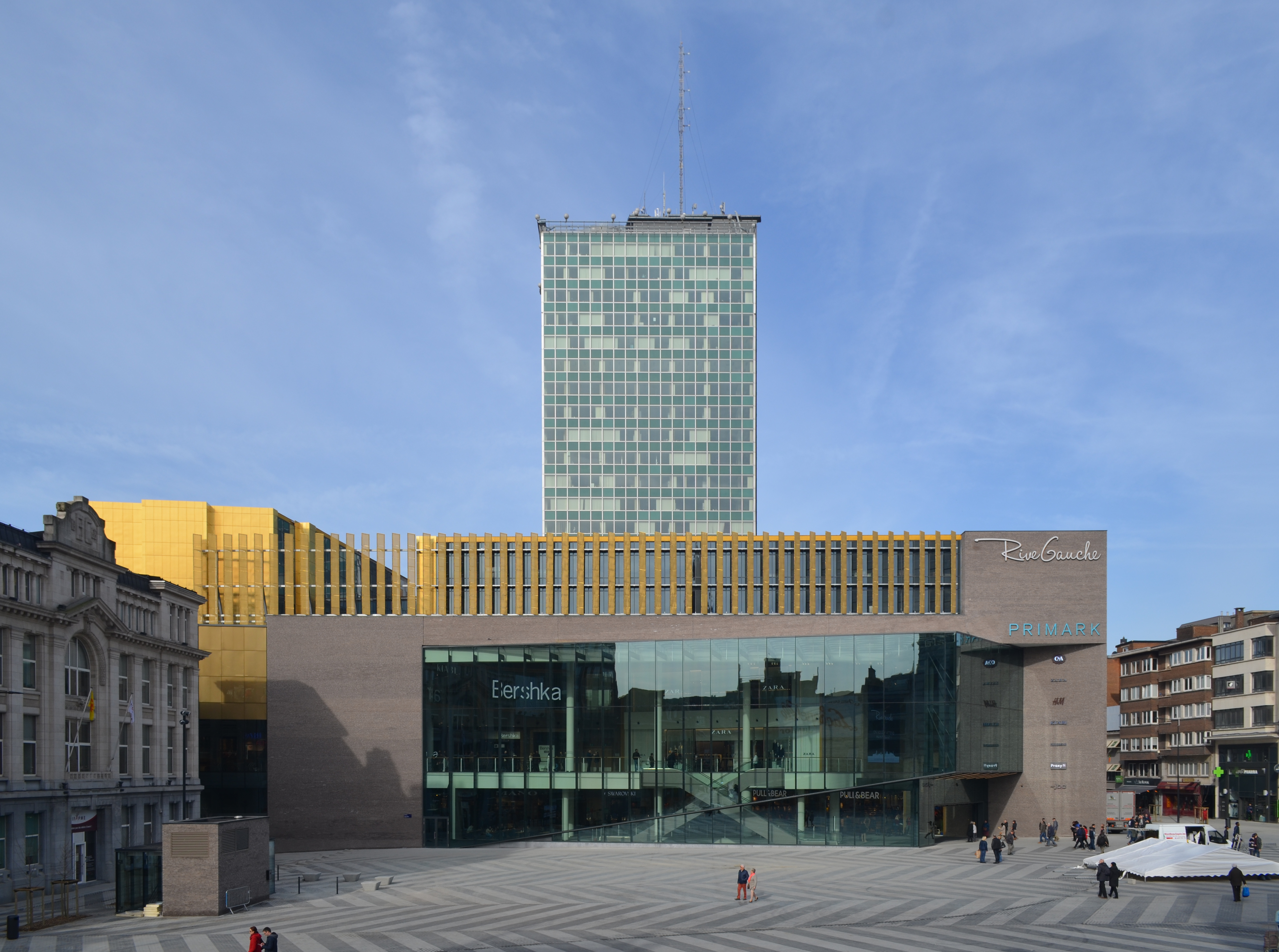
Rive Gauche

Charleroi lies in the center of a coal basin as well as steel and glass industries. Even so, due to the widespread loss in industrial power in the area since the 1970s, the coal and steel areas experienced a significant decline for most of the 1980s and 1990s.

From these industrial activities, the region of Charleroi has inherited a wide industrial area for electrical engineering and production of iron, steel, glass and chemicals. The conglomerate ArcelorMittal subdivided its Industeel unit to encompass the Charleroi steelworks.

Moreover, from the early 2000s, the overall economy of the area has diversified to include health care, logistics, biotechnologies, energy (Suez), railway transportation (Alstom) and telecommunications (Alcatel).

More recently, other sectors have developed, mainly civil and military aeronautics (SABCA, SONACA), logistics, printing and biotechnology. The aeronautics and space industry is developing rapidly around Charleroi-Brussels-South airport with the foundation of two university research centres: the Center of Excellence in Information Technologies (CETIC) serving as a center of expertise for the development of Walloon companies and founded by UCLouvain with the universities of Namur and Mons, as well as the Cenaero (Centre for research in aeronautics) of the University of Liège (ULiège), the University of Louvain (UCLouvain) and the University of Brussels (ULB).

Likewise, the Brussels South Charleroi Airport has evolved in a major commercial success with a grow of passengers from 210.000 in 1998 to 8.3 millions passengers in 2023. Therefore, it has become the second airport of Belgium for passenger transport which is a substantial asset for the economical and commercial development of the region of Charleroi. The activity of the airport thus generates numerous direct and indirect jobs.

The Intercommunale Igretec is the official body of the region of Charleroi giving assistance and support for the installation and development of high-tech companies around the airport and in the region of Charleroi.

Charleroi is also connected through highways with all the major cities of Belgium and the French border. It also has a port ("Port autonome de Charleroi") and a river network giving access to three major ports (Dunkirk, Antwerp and Rotterdam).

From the 1990s, two big shopping malls (Ville 2 and Rive Gauche), cinemas, and a local craft brewery have been built in and around the city center, bringing back shops and customers downtown.

== Education ==
Charleroi is the biggest city in Belgium without its own university. In 1966, the University of Louvain began operations in Charleroi with three faculties on its UCLouvain Charleroi campus based in the city centre and in Montignies-sur-Sambre, including the Louvain School of Management and, more recently, the Louvain School of Engineering, issuing Bachelor's and Master's degrees and conducting research. Other universities have since started operations in Charleroi, including the Universities of Namur, Mons and the Université libre de Bruxelles.

In Charleroi, a Campus of Sciences, Art and Trade is currently being developed by the European Regional Development Fund (ERDF) of the European Union. This campus, located on the site of the University of Labour, will constitute a centre of training, teaching and research in the city with a Cité des Métiers, a university centre, a centre for technological higher education, and a design and innovation competence centre.

=== Primary and secondary schools ===
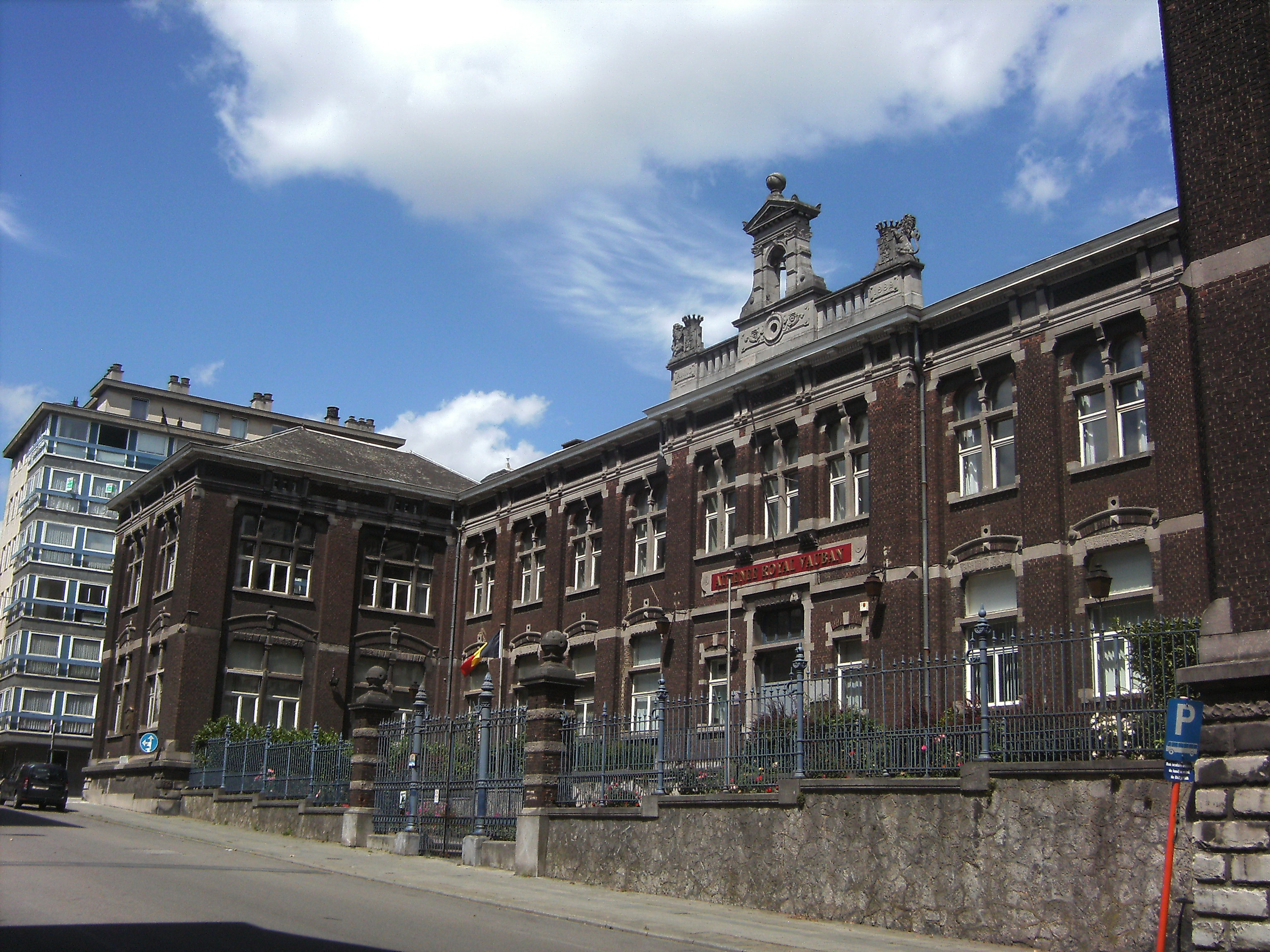
Athénée Royal Vauban

Secondary schools include:

- Athénée Royal Jules Destrée
- Athénée Royal Orsini Dewerpe
- Athénée Royal de Gilly
- Athénée Royal Les Marlaires
- Athénée Royal Ernest Solvay
- Athénée Royal Vauban
- Athénée Royal Yvonne Vieslet
- Centre Educatif Communal Secondaire — La Garenne
- Institut d'Enseignement Technique Secondaire de l'UT
- Institut Jean Jaurès de l'UT
- Centre Educatif Communal Secondaire de Couillet-Marcinelle
- Institut Provincial d'Enseignement Secondaire Paramédical La Samaritaine

The catholic secondary schools include:

- Institut Saint-Joseph (ISJ);
- Institut Saint-André (ISA);
- Institut Notre-Dame (IND);
- IET Notre-Dame (IETND);
- Collège du Sacré-Cœur (jesuits);
- Collège Technique Aumôniers du Travail de Charleroi (ATC).

== Transport ==
=== Air ===
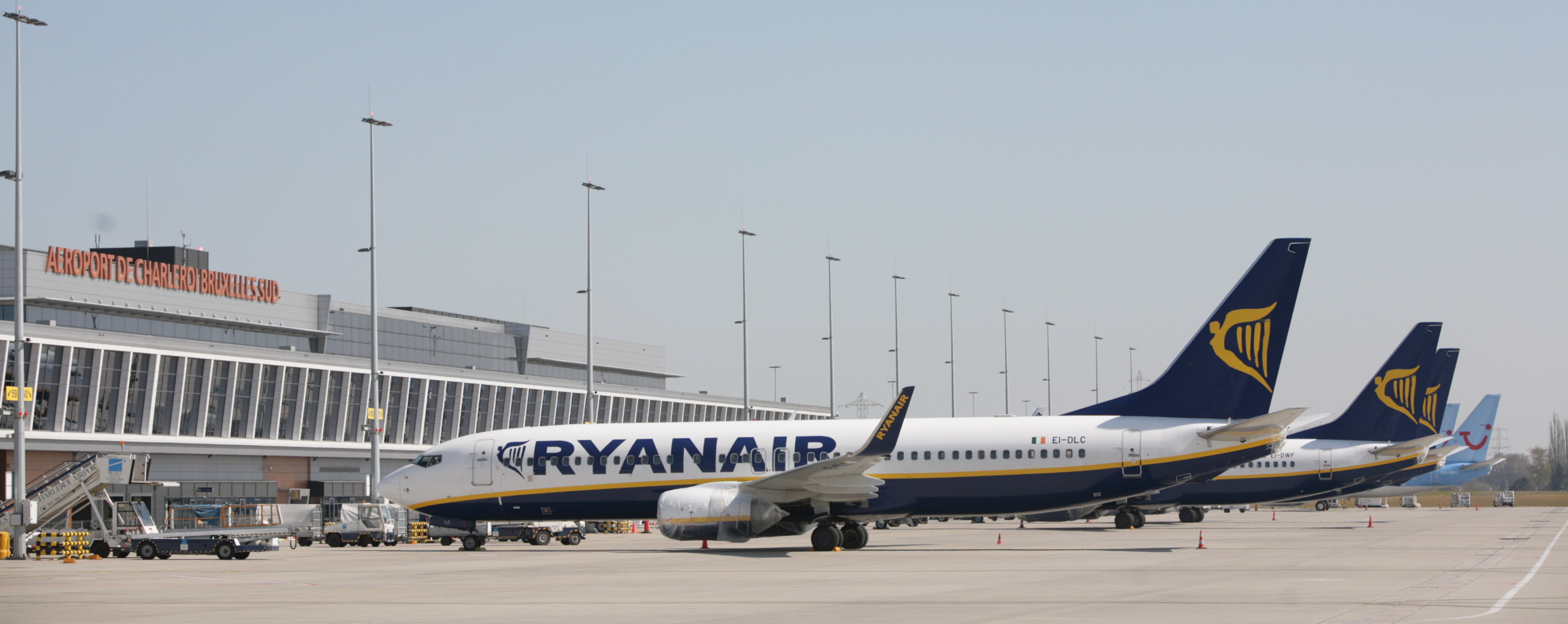
Brussels South Charleroi Airport

The Brussels South Charleroi Airport in Gosselies, 7 km (4.3 mi) north of the centre, opened in 1919 as a flight school. Later, it housed the Fairey aircraft-factory building.

Gosselies is now used as an alternate airport for Brussels. Low-cost carrier Ryanair is the largest airline to provide service there; others include Wizz Air and Jetairfly. Seasonal holiday charters also use the airport.

A new terminal opened in January 2008, replacing a much smaller building which had exceeded capacity.

Brussels is 47 km (29 mi) north of Charleroi Airport.

In October 2021, the 650 m (2,130 ft) extension of the runway was officially opened, bringing it to a total length of 3,200 m (10,500 ft).

=== Rail ===
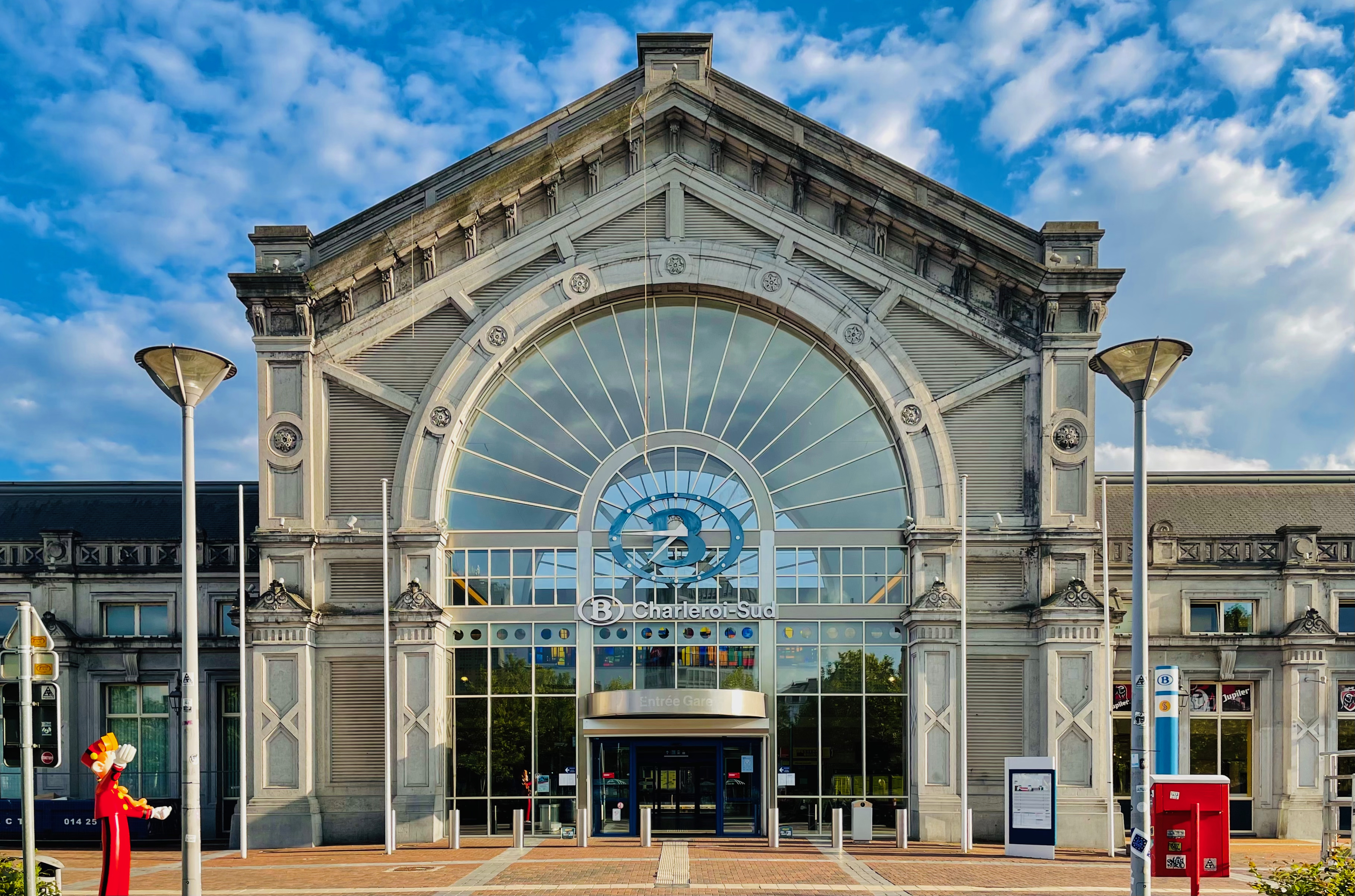
Charleroi-Central railway station

Charleroi is connected by train to other major Belgian cities through the main Charleroi-Central railway station. The city also has a secondary railway station, Charleroi-West, on the Charleroi-to-Ottignies line.

=== River transport ===
The Port autonome de Charleroi gives access through the Belgian, Dutch and French canal and river network to three major ports (Dunkirk, Antwerp and Rotterdam). It is composed of twenty-nine ports in the region of Charleroi distributed along the river Sambre and the Brussels-Charleroi canal. It has 8 km of embankments, 5 million tons of goods transported each year, 10,000 containers and a trimodal platform for the containers; 100 companies have a concession and there are 1,700 direct and 1,000 indirect jobs associated.

=== Public transport ===
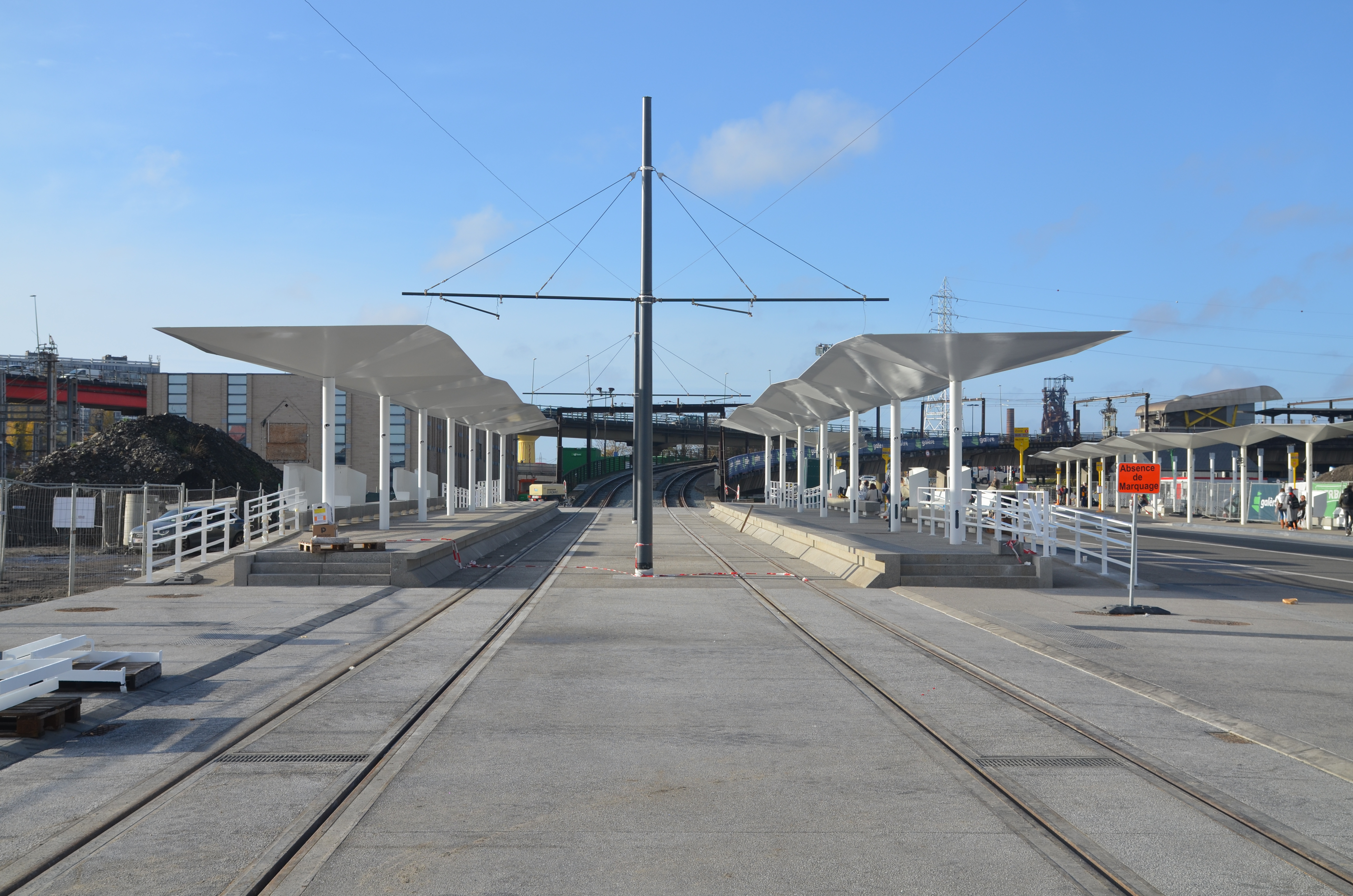
Gare centrale (MLC)

Public transport is provided by TEC (Transport En Commun), the Walloon public transport service. The greater Charleroi region is served by bus lines and a light-rail system named Métro Léger de Charleroi. Part of the latter is famous for incorporating one of the few remnants of the Vicinal, the former Belgian national tramway network. Charleroi also has a planned four-line S-bahn type suburban rail system, the Réseau express régional de Charleroi (Réseau S).

==== Charleroi light rail system ====
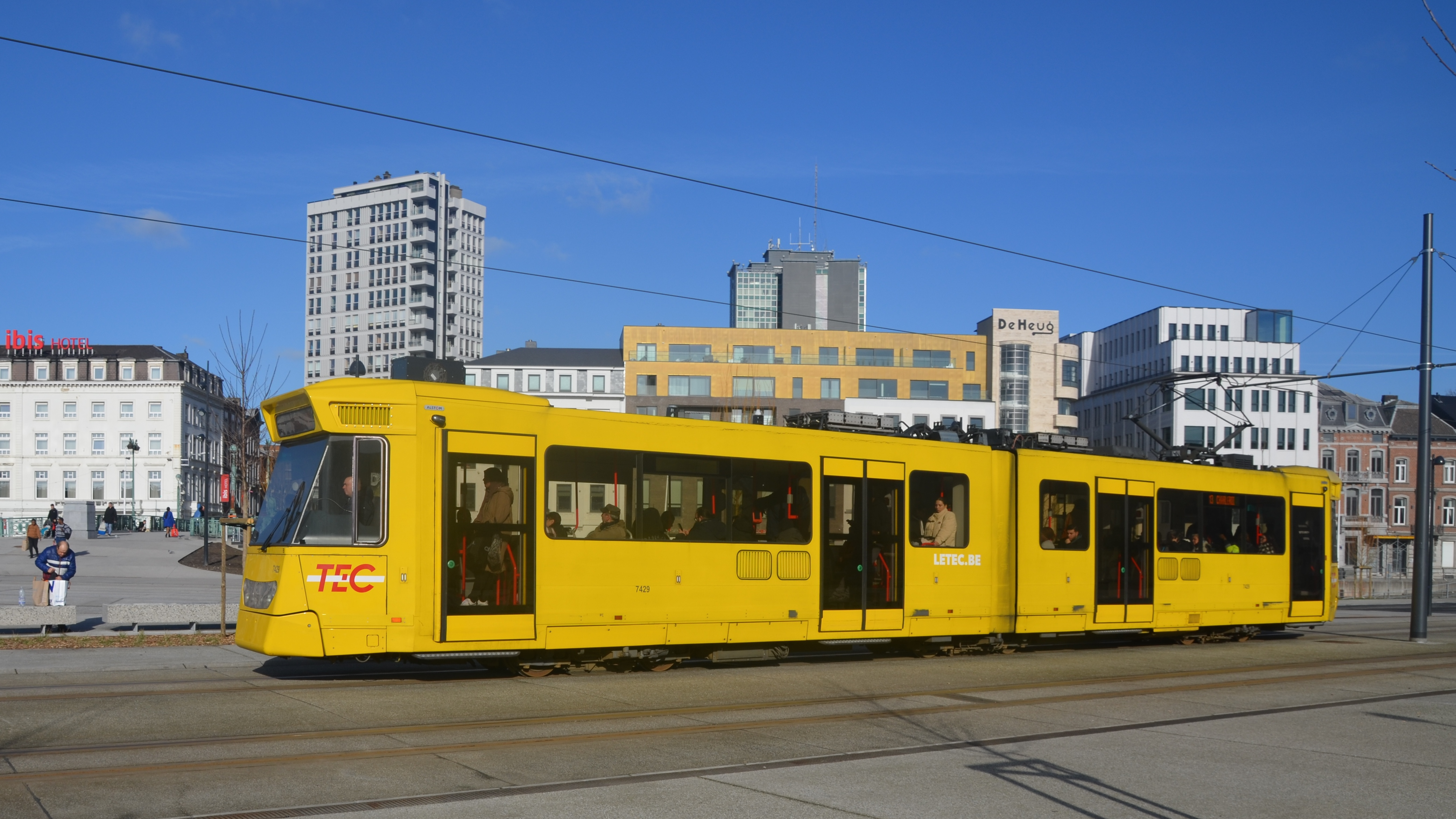
Métro Léger de Charleroi

The Métro Léger de Charleroi is equally famous for the parts of the system which were never built, partially built or fully completed but not opened. It was planned in the 1960s as a 48 km (30 mi.) light-rail network, operating partly on metro infrastructure, consisting of eight branch lines radiating from a central loop downtown. However, only one line (to Petria), part of another line (to Gilly) and three-quarters of the loop were actually built and opened to traffic, all from 1976 to 1996. Another branch line toward the suburb of Châtelet (Châtelineau) was almost fully built, to the extent of installing power cables, escalators and still-working electric signals in the first three stations but was never opened as passenger numbers would be too low to economically justify the extra staff. The high costs of construction, a decline in Charleroi's traditional "smokestack" industries and questioning of the scope of the whole project in proportion to the actual demand for it are cited as reasons for the original plan's becoming unfulfilled.

The central loop and the Gilly branch as far as Soleilmont were completed in 2012, with funds from the European Investment Bank. The Gosselies branch opened as a street-level tramline in 2013. In June 2021 it was announced that €60m will be allocated to refurbish and open the long-ago completed but never served inner section of the Châtelet "ghost" line, and extend it to the new hospital development in the area.

In June 2021, the new look of the first renovated tram was presented. This €22 million fleet-wide renovation will be completed by 2026.

== Demographics ==
Group of origin	Year	
Group of origin	2023	
Group of origin	Number	%
Belgians with Belgian background	98,798	48.48%
Belgians with foreign background (Note: The number includes Belgian nationals who either previously were foreign nationals themselves or at least one of their parents was a foreign national.)	70,839	34.76%
Neighboring country (Note: Countries included within this are: Germany; France; Luxembourg; the Netherlands; the United Kingdom;)	5,991	2.94%
EU27 (excluding neighbouring country)	26,518	13.01%
Outside EU 27	38,330	18.81%
Non-Belgians	32,367	15.88%
Neighbouring country (Note: Countries included within this are: Germany; France; Luxembourg; the Netherlands; the United Kingdom;)	2,529	1.24%
EU27 (excluding neighbouring country)	15,152	7.44%
Outside EU 27	14,686	7.21%
Total	203,785	100%

== Culture ==
=== Museums ===
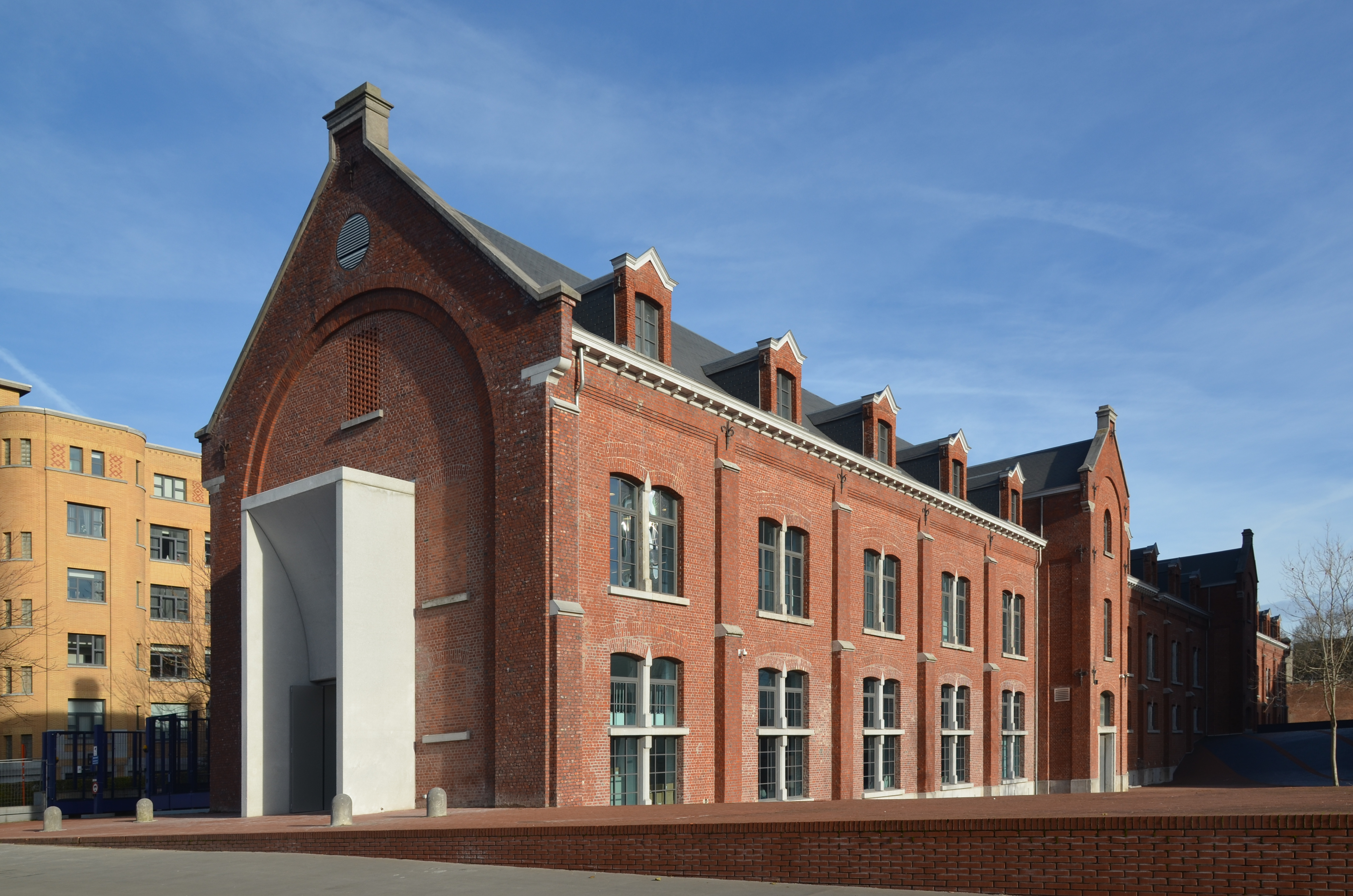
The Musée des Beaux-Arts

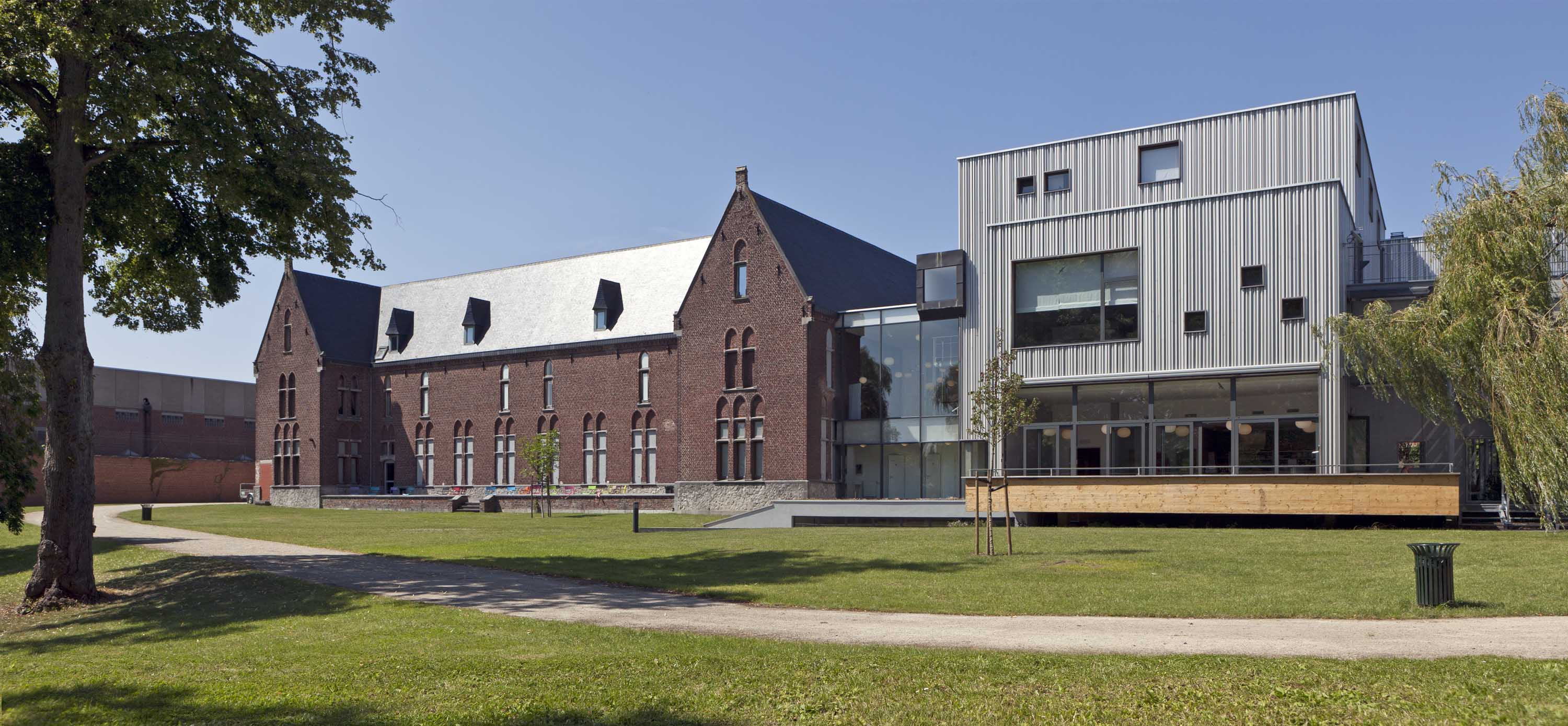
Musée de la photographie

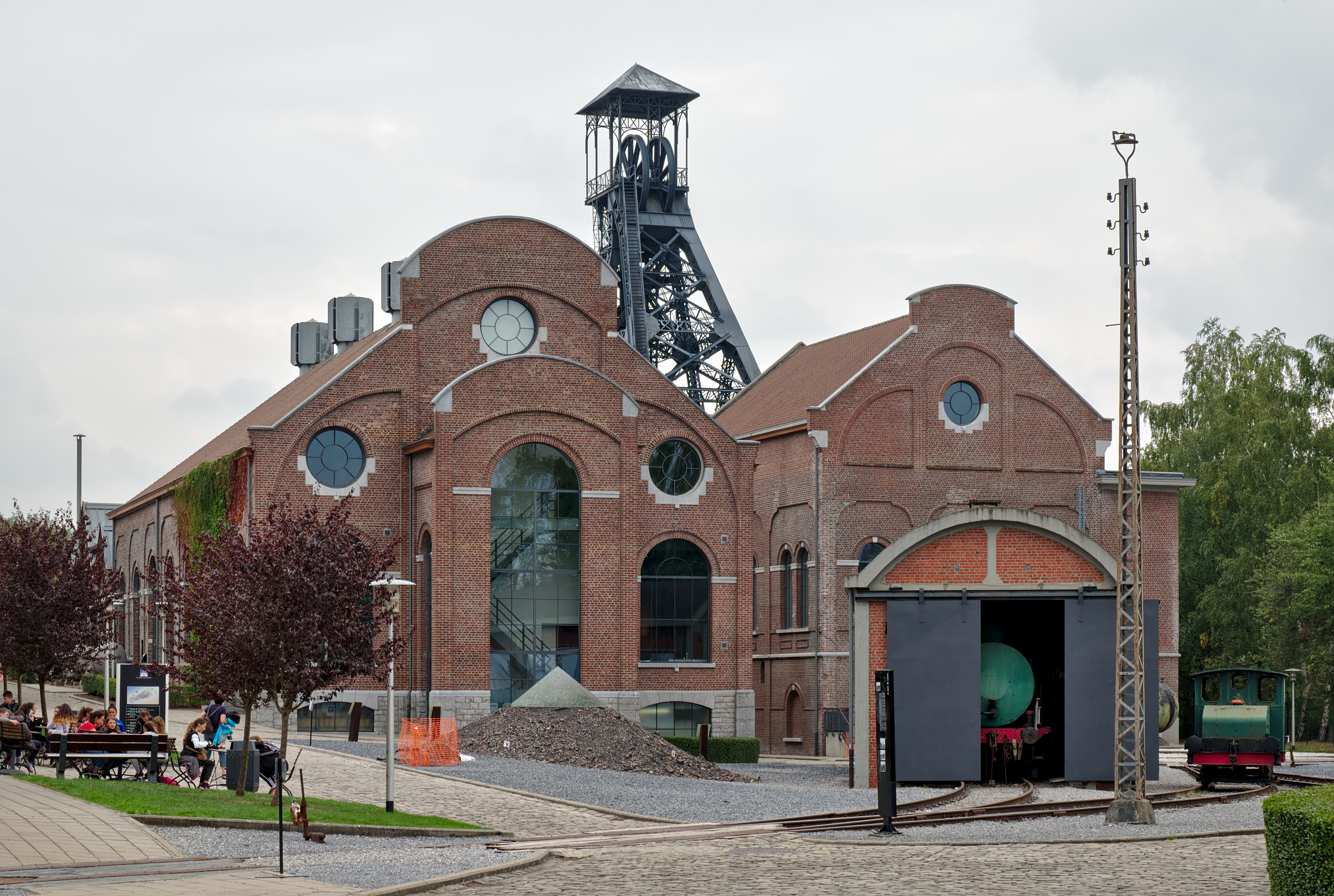
The Bois du Cazier

- Musée de la photographie, opened in 1987, is housed in a former Gothic Revival Carmelite monastery. It is the largest photography museum in Europe, featuring a diverse collection and hosting various exhibitions in Mont-sur-Marchienne
- Musée des Chasseurs à pied, located in the former Corporal Tresignie barracks (named after Léon Trésignies, a Belgian hero of World War I), is a military museum.
- BPS22, art museum of the Hainaut province installed in a former industrial hall built during the Charleroi exhibition in 1911, in which training was provided for industrial professions.
- Bois du Cazier, in Marcinelle
- Musée des Beaux-Arts ("Museum of Fine Arts"), is housed in a former cavalry barracks. This historic building was transformed to showcase a diverse collection of artworks, like François-Joseph Navez, Gustave Camus and Pierre Paulus. It is located near the Tour Bleue created by Jean Nouvel.

=== Theatres and dance hall ===
- Charleroi Danses
- Théâtre de l'Ancre

=== Performance halls and cultural centers ===
- Rockerill, alternative concert hall, exhibition space and performances located in Marchienne-au-Pont
- Vecteur, multidisciplinary cultural platform
- Eden, performance hall

=== Media ===
- Éditions Dupuis, comic and magazines publisher located in Marcinelle
- Telesambre, regional television channel
- La Nouvelle Gazette, a Belgian French-language daily newspaper

=== Folklore events ===
- The Marches of Entre-Sambre-et-Meuse : every year, from May to October, the Marches of Entre-Sambre-et-Meuse, both a religious procession and a folk march, take place in Jumet (Tour de la Madeleine) and in the region south of Charleroi, which bring together many walkers parading in costumes of First Empire and Third Empire uniform. In 2012, fifteen of these marches were recognised as masterpieces of the Oral and Intangible Heritage by UNESCO.
- The Mardi Gras carnival with the release of the giants puppets and the parade of the Climbias, a folk and charity club in Lodelinsart.
- The Easter and August fairs.
- The Sunday market.

=== Itineraries, tours ===
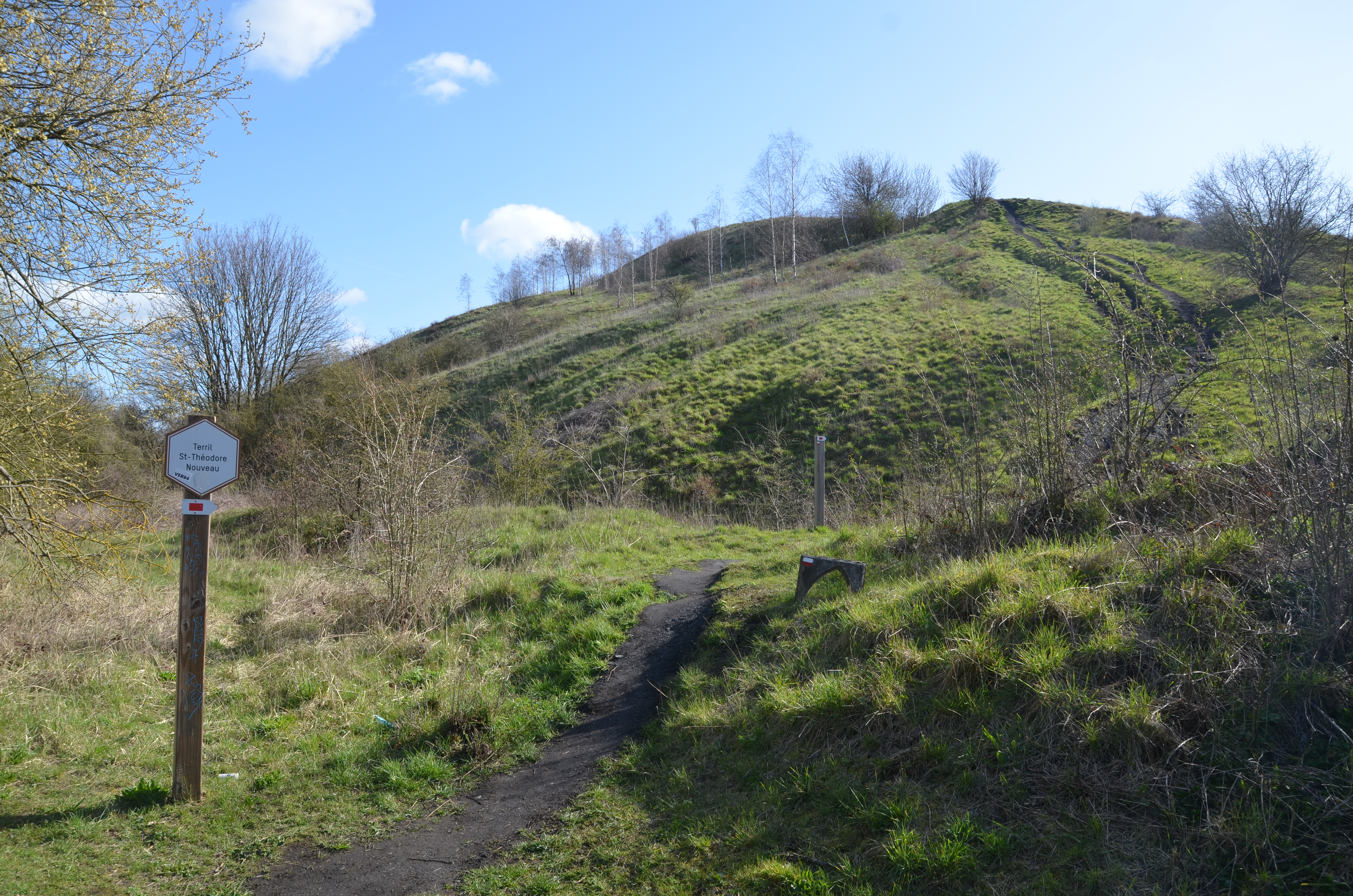
The Saint-Théodore slag heap. A walkway of the Boucle Noire.

- Boucle Noire ("Black Loop"), a 26 km walk between the industrial and natural landscape of Charleroi
- Grande dérive ("Big Drift") : this path forms a 54 km loop surrounding the greater Charleroi. La Grande Dérive, passes through the green margins of Charleroi, on marked trails, climbing on the slag heaps and crossing public parks, woods, agricultural areas and wasteland.
- Eurovelo 3 pilgrims' route : Charleroi is located on the EuroVelo3 route. It is a 5,122 km long road that connects Trondheim in Norway to Santiago de Compostela in Spain. The route thus crosses seven countries, Norway, Sweden, Denmark, Germany, Belgium, France and Spain.
- In the Charleroi region, the RAVeL network (in French Réseau Autonome des Voies Lentes and in English autonomous network of slow ways) allows cycling for sports and tourism purposes on protected routes. The routes take the towpaths along the river Sambre and the Charleroi-Brussels canal and on disused railway lines.

== Sports ==
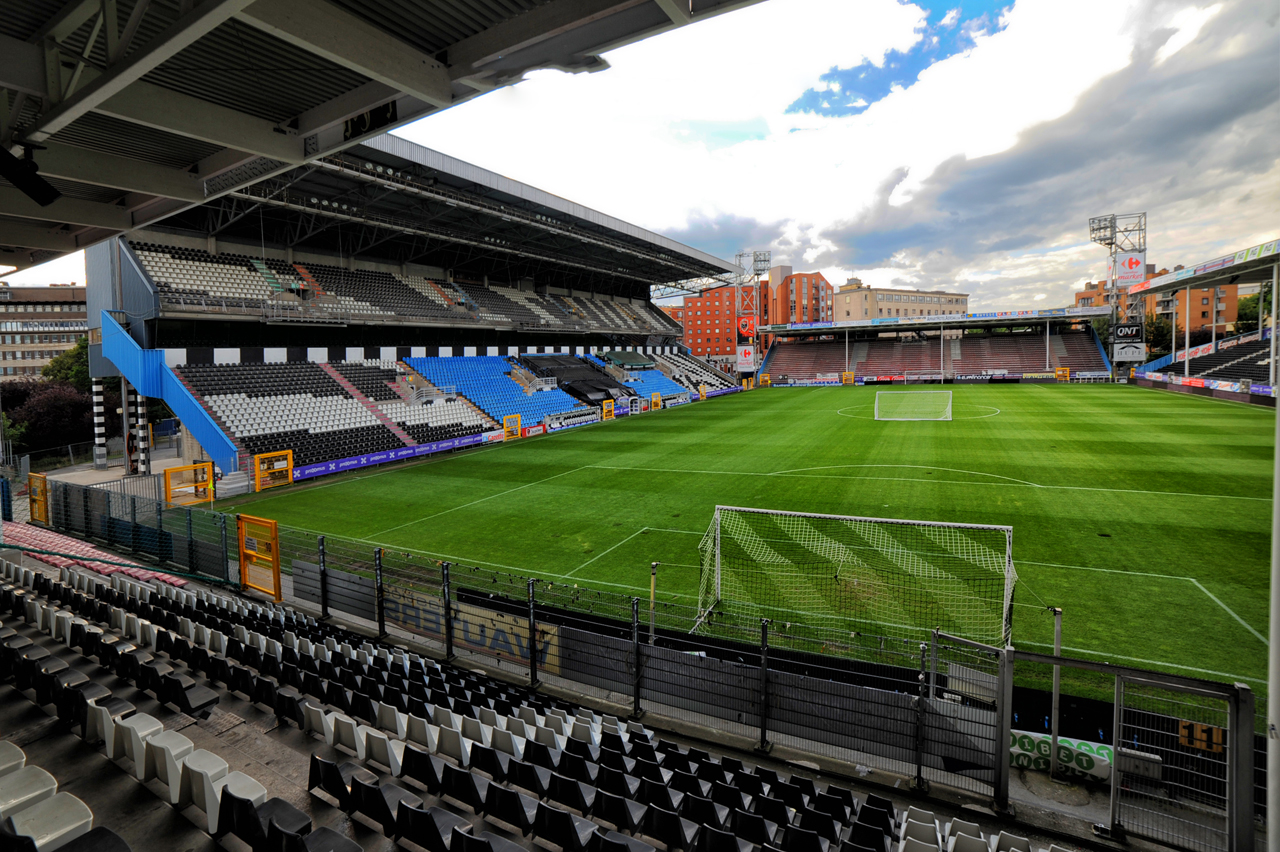
Stade du Pays de Charleroi

Charleroi is home to a number of champion teams in various sports. Spirou Charleroi in basketball has been an eight-times winner in the Basketball League Belgium. La Villette Charleroi in table tennis is the most successful club in the Champions League with five titles and has been the Belgian champion multiple times. Action 21 Charleroi in futsal has won one UEFA Futsal Cup and nine titles in the Belgian Division 1. In football, Royal Charleroi SC and ROC Charleroi have finished second in the Belgian Pro League. The 30,000-capacity Stade du Pays de Charleroi was a venue at UEFA Euro 2000.

== Notable people ==
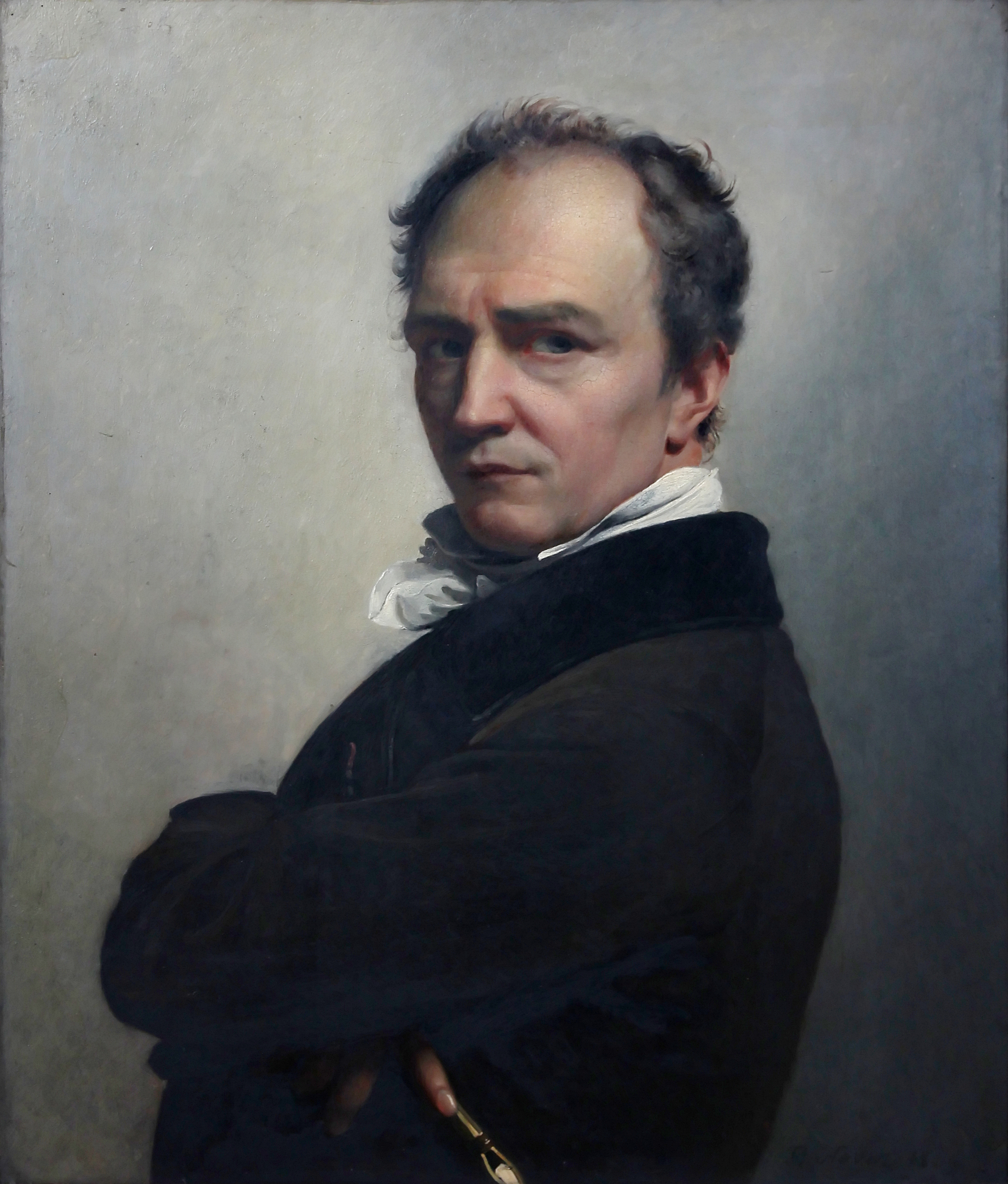
Painter François-Joseph Navez (self-portrait)

=== Born in Charleroi ===
- Léon Rosenfeld (1904–1974), physicist
- Jean-Marie André, scientist
- Alexandre Czerniatynski, football player, winner of the UEFA cup
- Jules Destrée, lawyer and politician, born in Marcinelle, 19th century
- Karl Erjavec, Slovenian lawyer and politician, Minister of Foreign Affairs, born in Aiseau
- Paul Finet (1897–1965), Belgian politician, born in Montignies-sur-Sambre
- Albert Frère, businessman and the richest person in Belgium
- Régis Genaux, football player
- Paul-François Huart-Chapel, industrialist, 19th century
- Jean-Pierre Lecocq (1947–1992), molecular biologist and entrepreneur
- Georges Lemaître (1894–1966), priest and astronomer, 20th century
- Fabrice Lig, music producer, 20th century
- Loïc Nottet, musician
- Jean Dupuis, printer and editor, founder of the Dupuis editions
- Pierre Marcolini, chocolatier
- Joseph Maréchal, Jesuit priest and philosopher, 20th century
- Joëlle Milquet, politician, 20th century
- Chantal Mouffe, political theorist, 20th century
- François-Joseph Navez, painter, 18th century
- Paul Pastur, lawyer and politician
- Gaston Salmon (1878–1917), épée fencer, Olympic champion
- Marcel Thiry, poet, 19th century
- Jeanne Toussaint (1887–1976), jeweller
- Raymond Troye, wartime writer, 20th century
- Annette Vande Gorne, composer
- Fernand Verhaegen, painter and etcher, born in Marchienne-au-Pont, 19th century

=== Resided in Charleroi ===
- Robert Arcq, writer
- Paul Cuvelier, painter and comics artist
- Arthur Grumiaux, violinist
- Ernest Solvay, Belgian chemist, industrialist and philanthropist
- Paul Magnette, Belgian politician (Socialist Party), current mayor of Charleroi, former political science professor at the Université libre de Bruxelles (ULB) and Minister-President of Wallonia from 2014 to 2017
- René Magritte, painter
- Pierre Paulus, Expressionist painter of industrial landschapes of Charleroi
- Arthur Rimbaud, poet
- Paul Verlaine, poet

== Twin cities ==
Charleroi is twinned with the following places:

- Hirson, France
- Saint-Junien, France
- Sélestat, France
- Schramberg, Germany
- Waldkirch, Germany
- Manoppello, Italy
- Casarano, Italy
- Follonica, Italy
- Himeji, Japan (since 1965)
- Donetsk, Ukraine (since 1983)
- (United States) Pittsburgh, US

== See also ==
- Aéropole Science Park
- Dauphines Charleroi
- ICDI affair
- List of municipalities in Wallonia
- Municipalities of Belgium
- R. Charleroi S.C.
- R.O.C. Charleroi
- Maison Mattot
- Charleroi Courthouse
- Broucheterre Swimming Pool
