= Marabout metro station =

Metro station in Charleroi, Belgium

Marabout

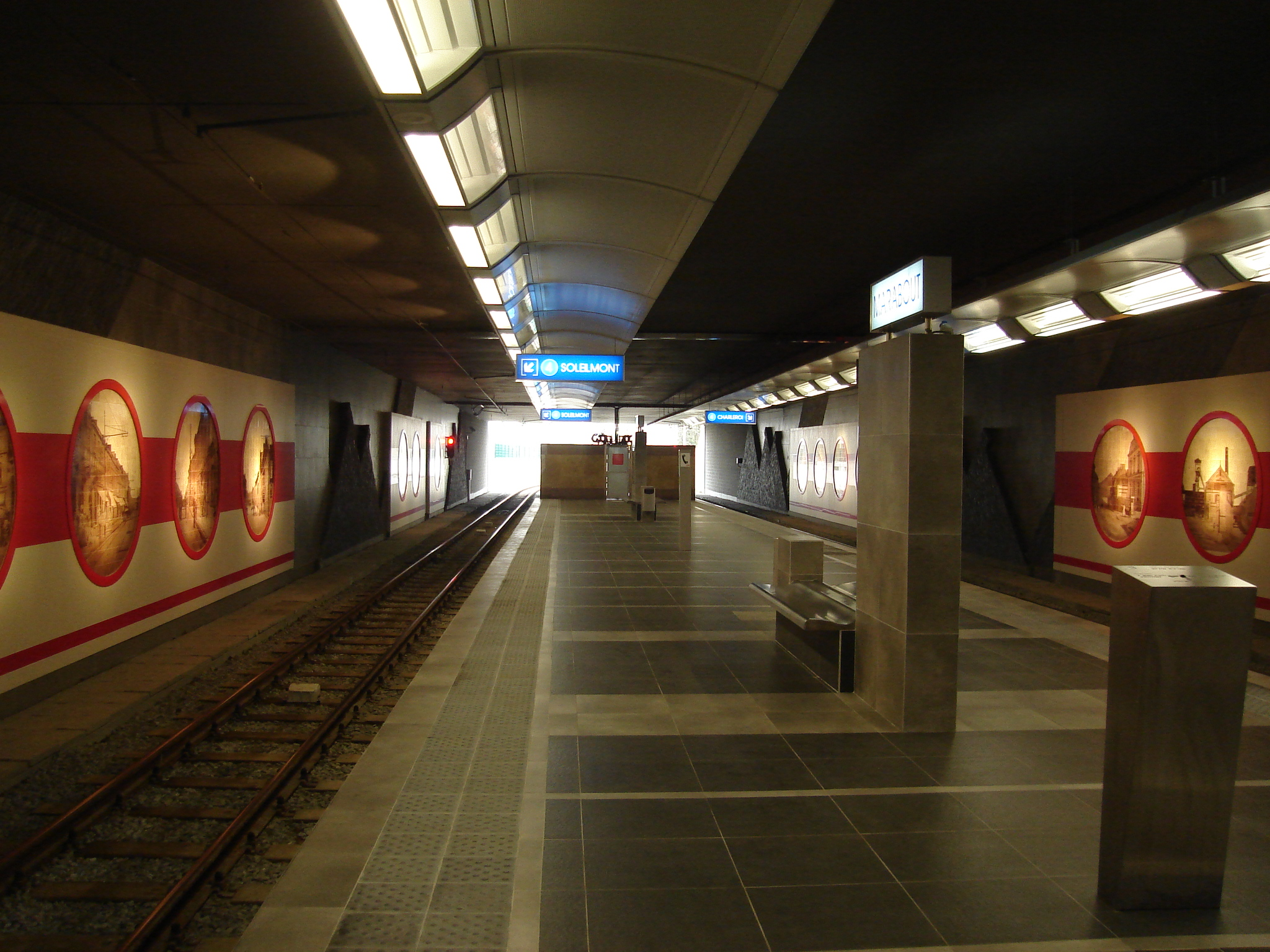

General information
- Coordinates: 50°25′37″N 4°29′14″E
- Transit authority: TEC Charleroi
- Platforms: Central
- Tracks: 2
- Bus routes: 3
- Bus operators: TEC Charleroi

Construction
- Depth: Underground
- Platform levels: 1

Other information
- Fare zone: 2

History
- Opened: 27 February 2012

Services
Preceding station	Charleroi Metro	Following station
Gilly towards Sud	M4	Sart-Culpart towards Soleilmont
Location

Marabout is a Charleroi Metro station located in Gilly, Belgium (part of the Charleroi municipality), opened on 27 February 2012 as part of the Soleilmont extension of the Gilly branch of the Charleroi Pre-metro. The station is entirely underground and features a central platform with street access at its western end. Decoration inside the station depicts old views of Charleroi.

The station is located in TEC Charleroi fare zone 2.

The main station structure was built in the 1980s but was never put into service until 27 February 2012.

== Nearby points of interest ==
The station is located in a residential area of Gilly (the Louvy neighbourhood).

== Transfers ==
There are no direct train or bus transfers at the station. There is a TEC Charleroi bus stop, named Marabout and served by lines 11, 12 and 12b in the vicinity, but its location involves a 500-metre (1,600 ft) walk to the station.

== See also ==
- List of Charleroi Metro stations
