= Charleroi-West railway station =

Railway station in Hainaut, Belgium

Charleroi-West
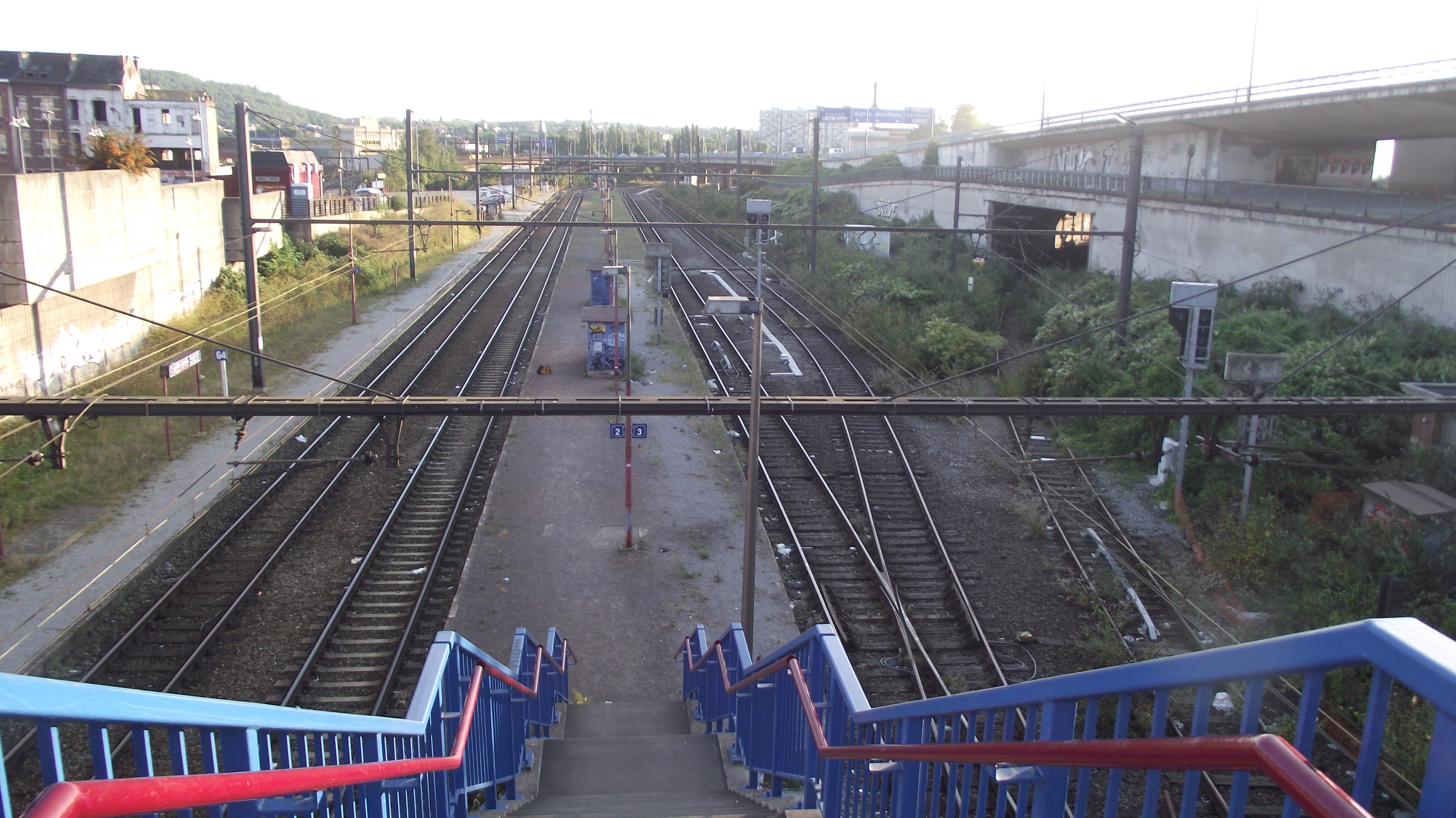
- Charleroi-West railway station

General information
- Location: Place de l'Ouest, 6000 Charleroi; Belgium
- Coordinates: 50°24′38″N 4°26′11″E
- System: Railway Station
- Owner: SNCB/NMBS
- Operator: SNCB/NMBS
- Lines: 140, 260
- Platforms: 1
- Tracks: 2

Construction
- Parking: Yes

History
- Opened: 20 August 1855; 171 years ago
- Rebuilt: 1886; 140 years ago

Services
Preceding station	NMBS/SNCB	Following station
Lodelinsart towards Ottignies	L 14	Charleroi-Sud towards Jambes
Location
- Location within Belgium Location within Europe

Charleroi-West railway station (French: Gare de Charleroi-Ouest; Dutch: Station Charleroi-West) (Note: Officially Charleroi-West (French: Charleroi-Ouest; Dutch: Charleroi-West)) is a secondary railway station serving Charleroi, Hainaut, Belgium. It is one of two railway stations located in downtown Charleroi, the other one being the much larger Charleroi-Central railway station. It is operated by the National Railway Company of Belgium (SNCB/NMBS).

Charleroi-West is also a station of the Charleroi metro.

== Rail station ==
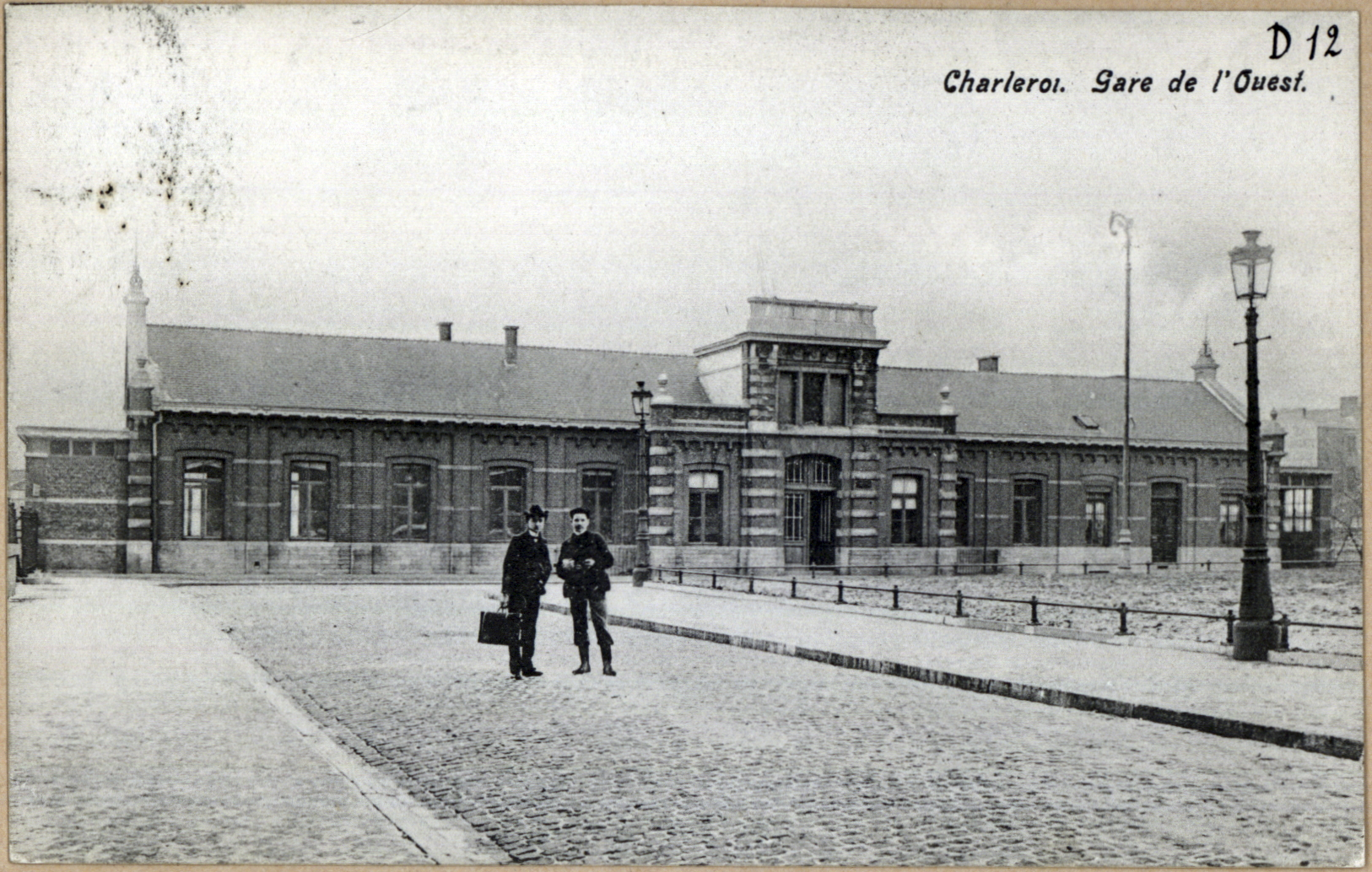
Charleroi-West railway station at the beginning of the 20th century

Charleroi-West is a small, unstaffed station with no building or other services of its own, served only by Belgian railway line 140 linking Charleroi to Ottignies. Charleroi-West used to be a dead-end station (and thus the terminus of line 140) until 27 May 1987, when a rail connection to Charleroi-South was opened (since renamed Charleroi-Central). The 6 km industrial line 260 links Charleroi-Ouest with the freight classification yard of Monceau-sur-Sambre.

Because of its proximity to Charleroi-Central and the limited train service, Charleroi-West sees very little passenger traffic, with a weekday average of 75 boarding passengers on weekdays (20 on Saturdays, 30 on Sundays) in 2007.

The original station, inaugurated in 1855, was located slightly to the South. The current station was built between 1884 and 1886.

== Train services ==
The station is served by the following service(s):

- Local services (L-14) Ottignies - Fleurus - Charleroi - Tamines - Namur - Jambes

== Metro station ==
Ouest

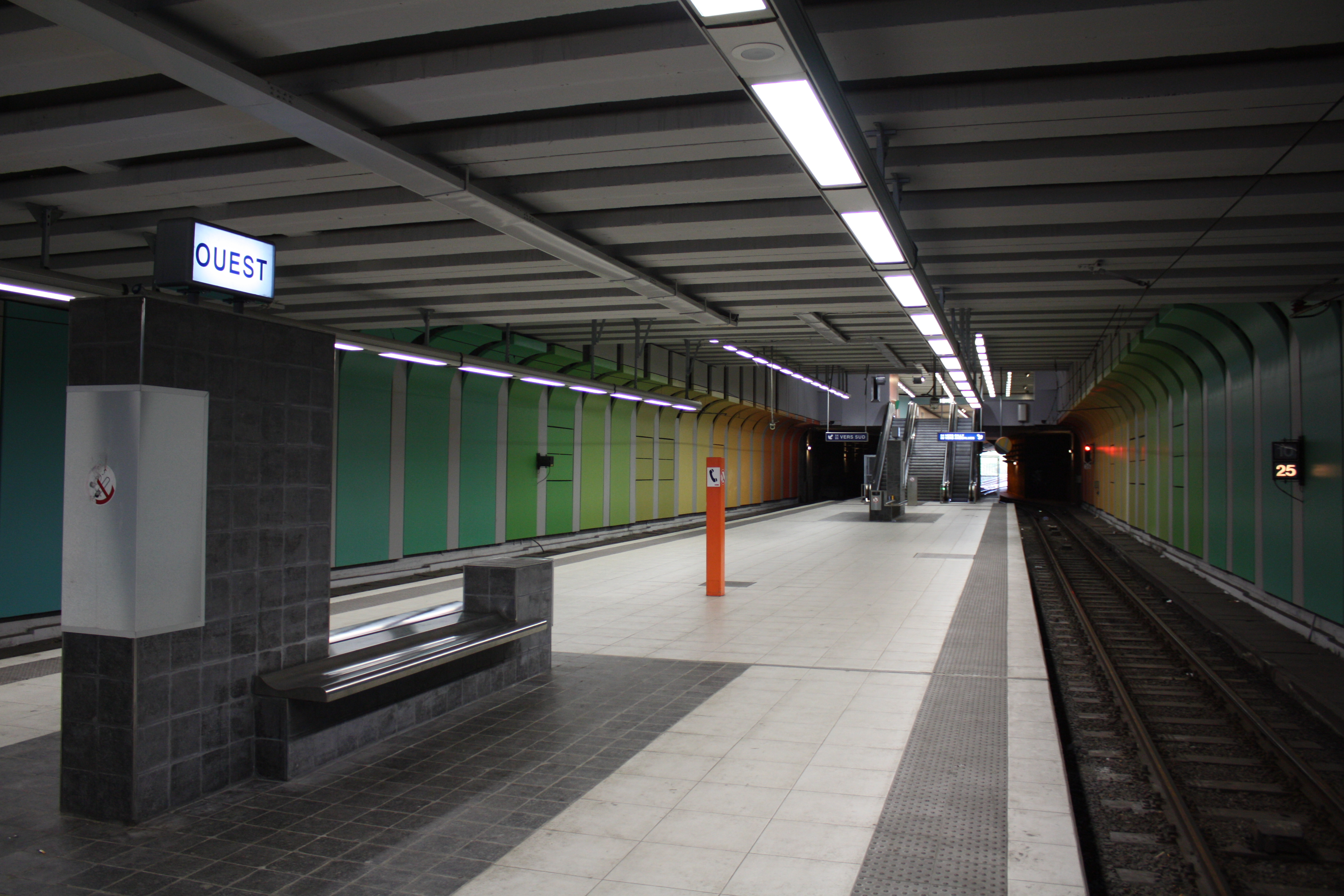

General information
- Transit authority: TEC Charleroi
- Platforms: Central
- Tracks: 2
- Bus routes: 7
- Bus operators: TEC Charleroi

Construction
- Platform levels: 2
- Parking: No

History
- Opened: 30 June 1980

Services
Preceding station	Charleroi Metro	Following station
Piges One-way operation	M1	Villette towards Monument
Palais towards Monument	M2	Villette One-way operation
Palais towards Faubourg de Bruxelles	M3	Villette One-way operation
Palais One-way operation	M4	Villette towards Soleilmont
Location

West (French: Ouest) is a Charleroi Metro station, located at the western end of Charleroi downtown, in fare zone 1. The station is accessible through three distinct street entrances leading to a mezzanine, giving access to the central platform via escalators.

The station has been renovated in 2009, with a new decoration based on works of local artist Charles Szymkowicz. The mezzanine level hosts 11 reproductions of Szymkowicz's watercolor paintings depicting Tuscany landscapes, made by Belgian ceramist Maurice Joly. One of the station entrances is adorned with a 3.5 x 4m fresco depicting Szymkowicz and his mother passing the so-called "viaduct" bridge where the station is now located.

== Nearby points of interest ==
- Charleroi Expo, main exhibition hall in Charleroi.

== Transfers ==
TEC Charleroi bus lines 41, 43, 83, 85, 86 and Midi-Docherie.

== See also ==
- List of railway stations in Belgium
- Rail transport in Belgium
- List of Charleroi Pre-metro stations
- Digue Square
