= Dampremy metro station =

Charleroi metro station

Dampremy

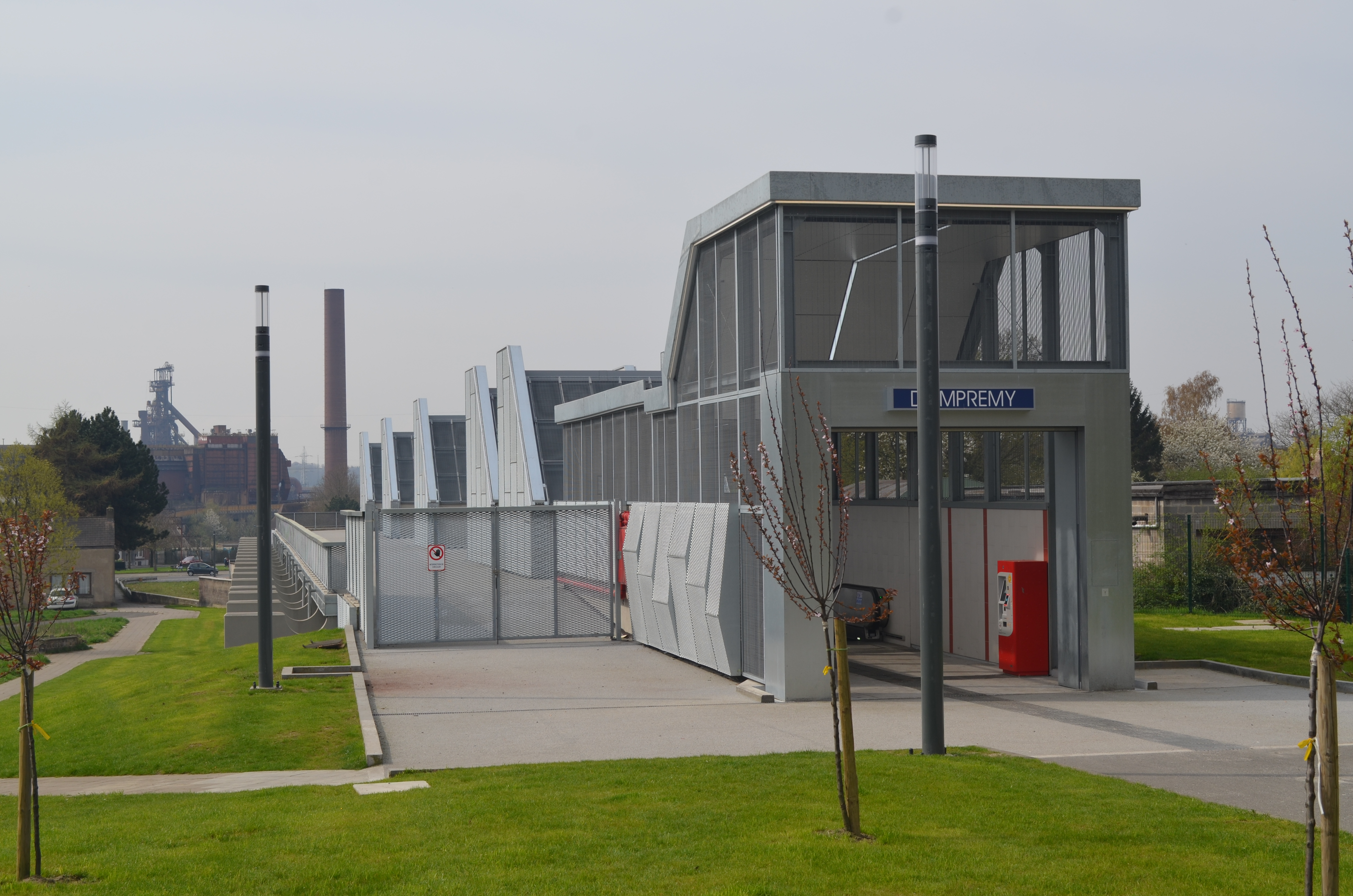

General information
- Coordinates: 50°25′00″N 4°25′43″E
- Transit authority: TEC Charleroi
- Platforms: Central
- Tracks: 2
- Bus routes: 1
- Bus operators: TEC Charleroi

Construction
- Parking: No

History
- Opened: 24 May 1983

Services
Preceding station	Charleroi Metro	Following station
Providence towards Monument	M1	Piges towards Sud
Providence towards Monument	M2	Piges towards Sud
Location

Dampremy is a Charleroi Metro station, located in Dampremy (part of the Charleroi municipality), in fare zone 1. The station is built as a semi-underground station, with underground tracks toward Piges and semi-underground tracks (leading to a viaduct) toward Providence.

== Nearby points of interest ==
The station is located in a residential area, close to the Dampremy cemetery and the Charleroi end of the Brussels–Charleroi Canal.

== Transfers ==
TEC Charleroi bus lines 41, 42, Midi-Docherie.
