= Villette metro station =

Metro station in Charleroi, Belgium

Villette

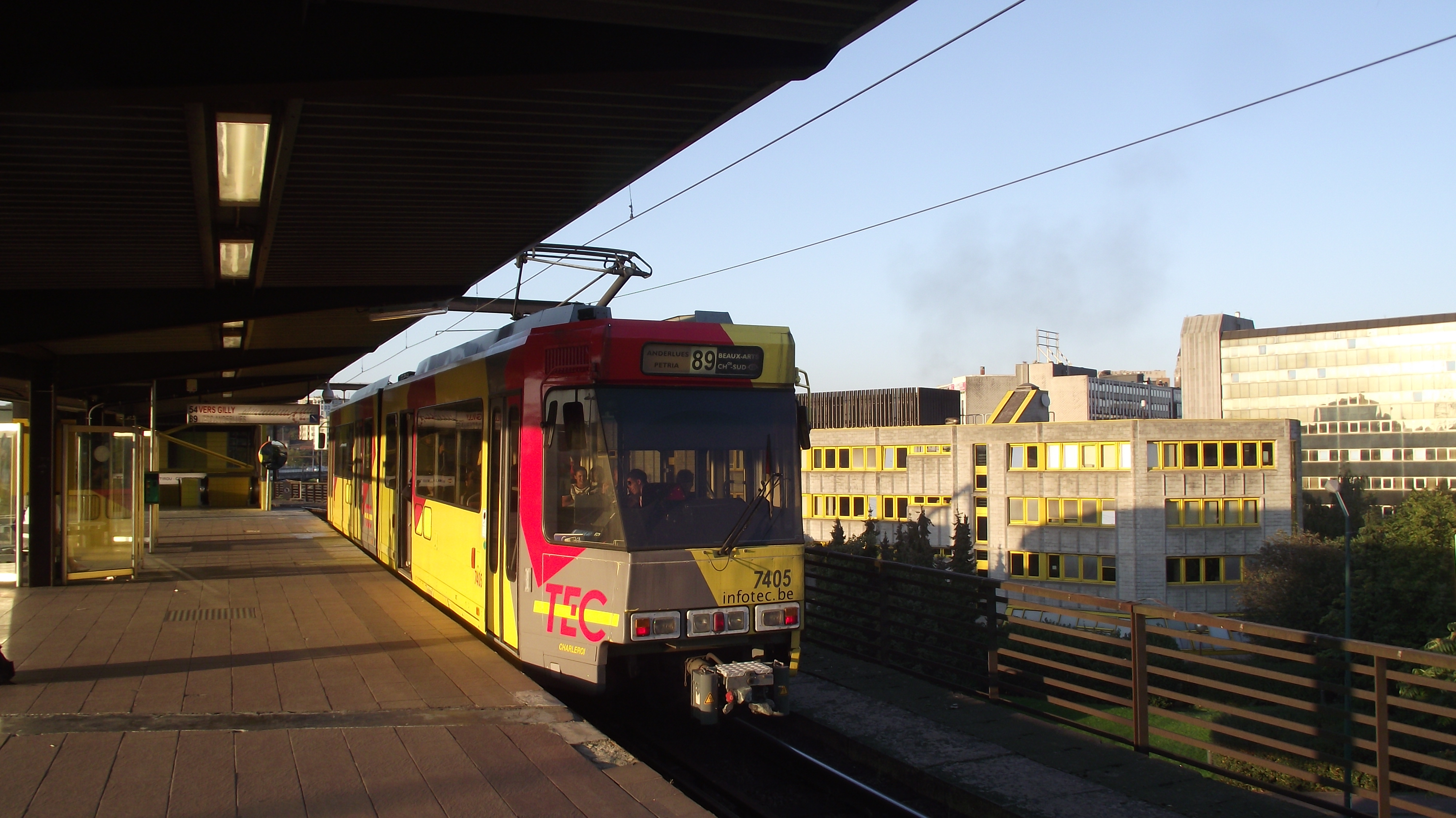

General information
- Coordinates: 50°24′23″N 4°26′6″E
- Transit authority: TEC Charleroi
- Platforms: Central
- Tracks: 2

Construction
- Platform levels: 1
- Parking: Yes

History
- Opened: 21 June 1976
- Closed: 10 December 2025

Services
Preceding station	Charleroi Metro	Following station
Ouest One-way operation	M1	Sud towards Monument
Ouest towards Monument	M2	Sud One-way operation
Ouest towards Faubourg de Bruxelles	M3	Sud One-way operation
Ouest One-way operation	M4	Sud towards Soleilmont
Location

Villette (French pronunciation: [vilɛt]) was a Charleroi Metro station, located at the southwestern end of Charleroi downtown, in fare zone 1. It was the first metro station in Belgium to be built on a viaduct, spanning over the river Sambre. The station is accessible from both banks of the river and features a central platform serving two tram tracks. Villette station is particularly close (300 m) to the Sud station.

== Nearby points of interest ==
- Headquarters of TEC Charleroi, a subsidiary of the Opérateur de transport de Wallonie in charge of public transportation in Charleroi.
- Charleroi branch of the Federal Public Service Finance.

== Transfers ==
There are no direct train or bus transfers at this station.
