= Piges metro station =

Metro station in Charleroi, Belgium

Piges

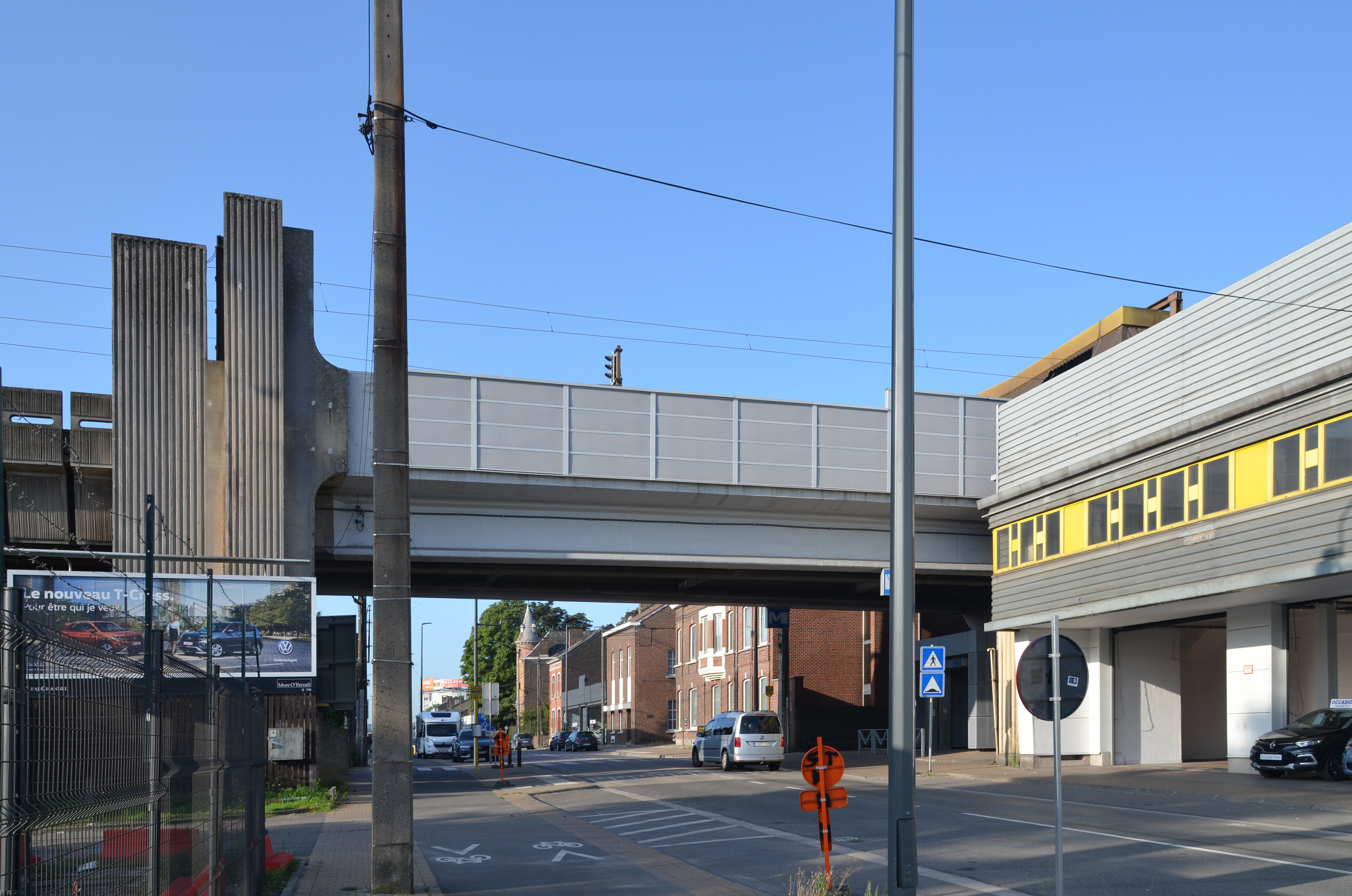

General information
- Coordinates: 50°24′55″N 4°26′14″E
- Transit authority: TEC Charleroi
- Platforms: Central
- Tracks: 2
- Bus routes: 3
- Bus operators: TEC Charleroi

Construction
- Parking: No

History
- Opened: 30 June 1980

Services
Preceding station	Charleroi Metro	Following station
Dampremy towards Monument	M1	Palais One-way operation
Dampremy towards Monument	M1	Ouest towards Sud
Dampremy towards Monument	M2	Palais towards Sud
Sacré Madame towards Faubourg de Bruxelles	M3	Palais towards Sud
Location

Piges (French pronunciation: [piʒ]) is a Charleroi Metro station, located in Dampremy (part of the Charleroi municipality), in fare zone 1. The station is built on a viaduct and is accessed through escalators and stairs from a street entrance located on Chaussée de Bruxelles (Brussels Road).

Although the station is built on a viaduct, tracks enter a tunnel at its western end, as they pass under a spoil tip (Terril des Piges) toward Dampremy.

A tram line to Gosselies starts at the station.

== Nearby points of interest ==
Station surroundings are sparsely populated (lower part of the Chaussée de Bruxelles) and do not feature important points of interest, which explains the low passenger flow through the station.

== Transfers ==
TEC Charleroi bus lines 365a, M3ab and Midi-Docherie.
