= Sart-Culpart metro station =

Metro station in Gilly, Belgium

Sart-Culpart

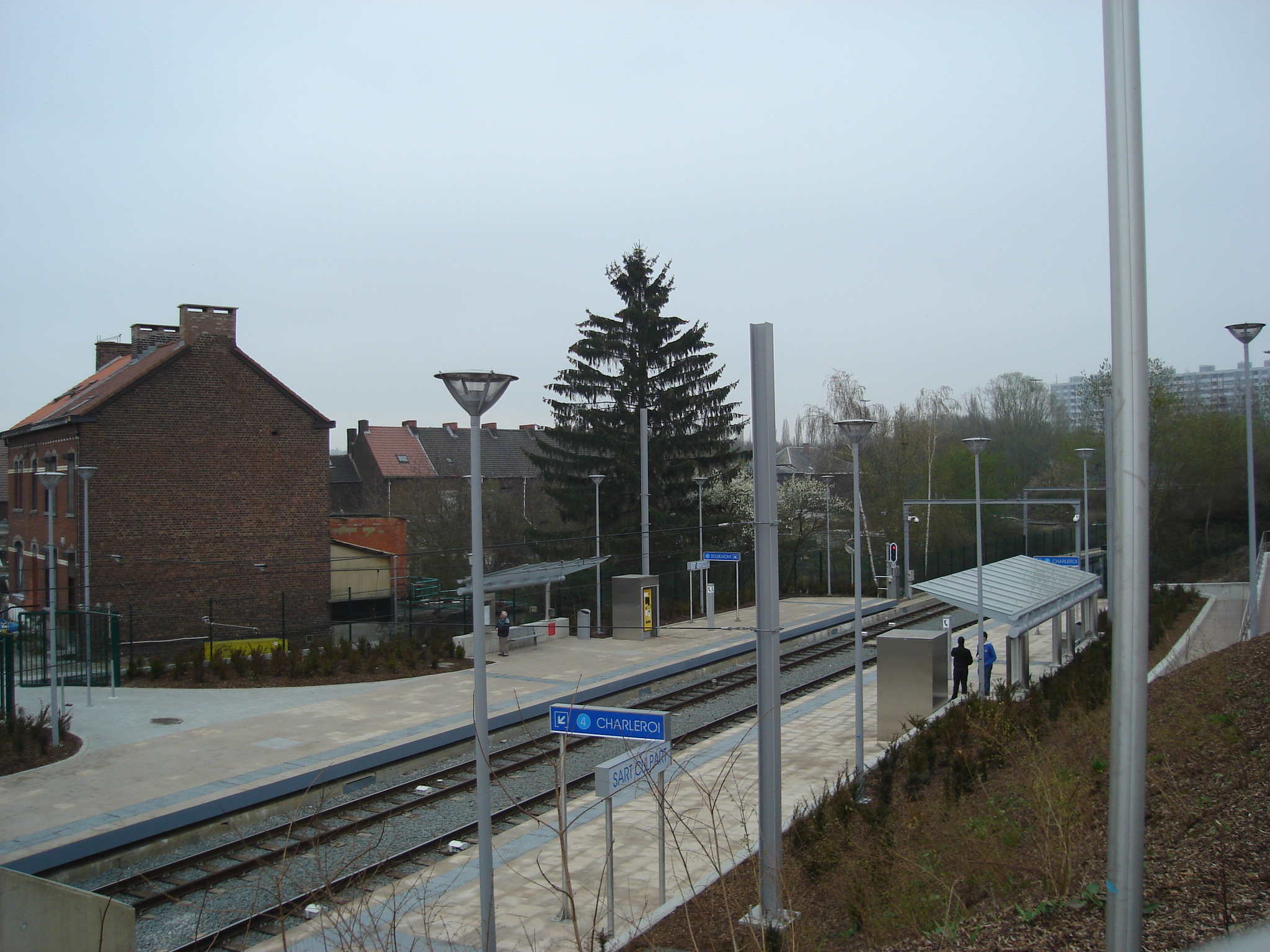

General information
- Coordinates: 50°25′45″N 4°29′43″E
- Transit authority: TEC
- Platforms: 2 lateral
- Tracks: 2

Construction
- Depth: Surface
- Platform levels: 1
- Parking: No

Other information
- Fare zone: 2

History
- Opened: 27 February 2012

Services
| Preceding station | Charleroi Metro | Following station |
|---|---|---|
| Marabout towards Sud | M4 | Soleilmont Terminus |
Location

Sart-Culpart (French pronunciation: [saʁ kylpaʁ]) is a Charleroi Metro station located in Gilly, Belgium (part of the Charleroi municipality), opened on 27 February 2012 as part of the Soleilmont extension of the Gilly branch of the Charleroi Pre-metro. The station is built at ground level and features a two lateral platforms.

The station is located in TEC Charleroi fare zone 2.

The original Sart-Culpart station structure was built in the 1980s as an underground station slightly to the east of the current location, but has never been put into service since then. The unfinished station has been vandalized through the years and it was rebuilt in a more urbanized and secure location as part of the 2009-2011 extension of the Gilly branch of the network.

The station is located in a residential area of Gilly (the Sart-Culpart neighbourhood).

There is no train or bus interchange at this station.

== Gilly-Sart-Culpart railway station ==
Gilly-Sart-Culpart railway station was a former station (1879–1953) on the now dismantled Belgian railway line 119 linking Châtelet to Luttre. It was located 700-metre (2,300 ft) northwest of the current pre-metro station.

== See also ==
- List of Charleroi Metro stations
