= Palais metro station =

Chareloi metro station

Palais

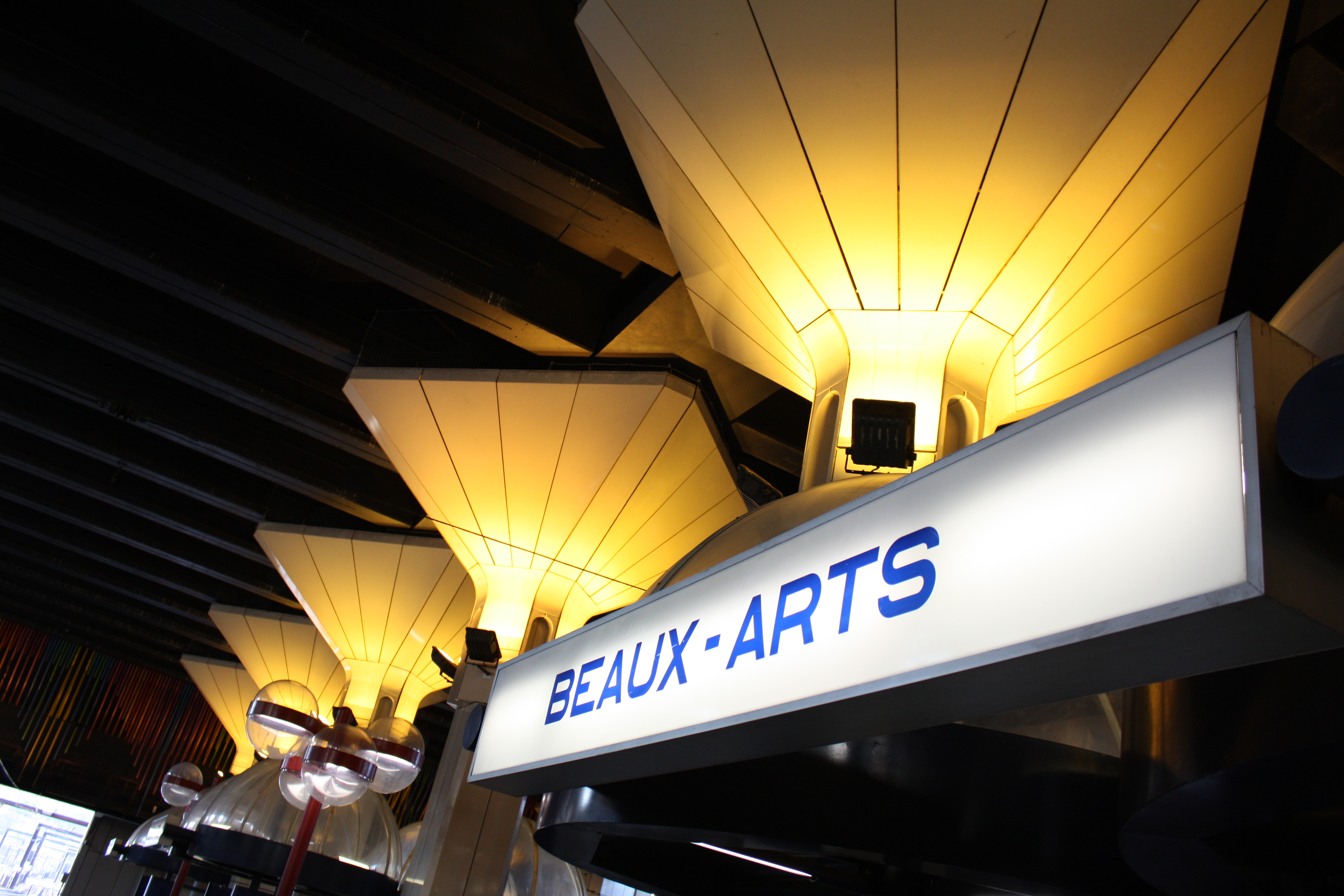

General information
- Coordinates: 50°24′53″N 4°26′35″E
- Transit authority: TEC Charleroi
- Platforms: 1 central, 1 lateral
- Tracks: 4

Construction
- Platform levels: 2
- Parking: Yes

History
- Opened: 24 May 1983
- Former names: Beaux-Arts

Services
Preceding station	Charleroi Metro	Following station
Piges towards Monument	M1	Waterloo One-way operation
Piges towards Monument	M2	Waterloo towards Sud
Piges towards Monument	M2	Ouest One-way operation
Piges towards Faubourg de Bruxelles	M3	Waterloo towards Sud
Piges towards Faubourg de Bruxelles	M3	Ouest One-way operation
Waterloo One-way operation	M4	Ouest towards Soleilmont
Location

Palais (French pronunciation: [palɛ], lit. 'Palace'), formerly Beaux-Arts (pronounced [boz‿aʁ], lit. 'Fine arts'), is the largest station in the Charleroi Metro network, located in Charleroi downtown, in fare zone 1. Because of its situation on a slope, the station terminates on a viaduct at one end (toward Ouest and Piges), and in a tunnel at the other end (toward Waterloo).

The station has two street entrances leading to a mezzanine level where ticket counters and shops are located. Platforms are accessible from the mezzanine through escalators and stairs.

The station has one lateral platform that used to serve former lines 88 and 89 to Anderlues, and one central platform that currently serves all lines. A third platform, not accessible to passengers, is used to exhibit old Charleroi trams.

One particularity of the station is a reversing loop for light rail vehicles entering the station from the west (from Piges or Ouest). It is used by lines M2 and M3, leaving the central loop on their way to Anderlues and Gosseiles, respectively, to enter and leave the station from the same side, thus needing to execute a U-turn. To do so, vehicles first pass through the station on a track not linked to any platform, then enter a loop shaped tunnel to end up in the station again, but from the other side.

The name of the station comes from the nearby Palais des Beaux-Arts (Fine arts palace), a music/theatre venue.

== Nearby points of interest ==
- Palais des Beaux-Arts (Fine arts palace), a music/theatre venue.
- Charleroi Expo, main exhibition hall in Charleroi.
- Charleroi belfry
- Charleroi city hall.

== Transfers ==
The Palais Pre-metro station is connected to one of two major bus stations in Charleroi (the other being Charleroi-Central). As such, numerous bus transfer options are available.
