= Charleroi Metro line 3 =

Transit line in Charleroi, Belgium

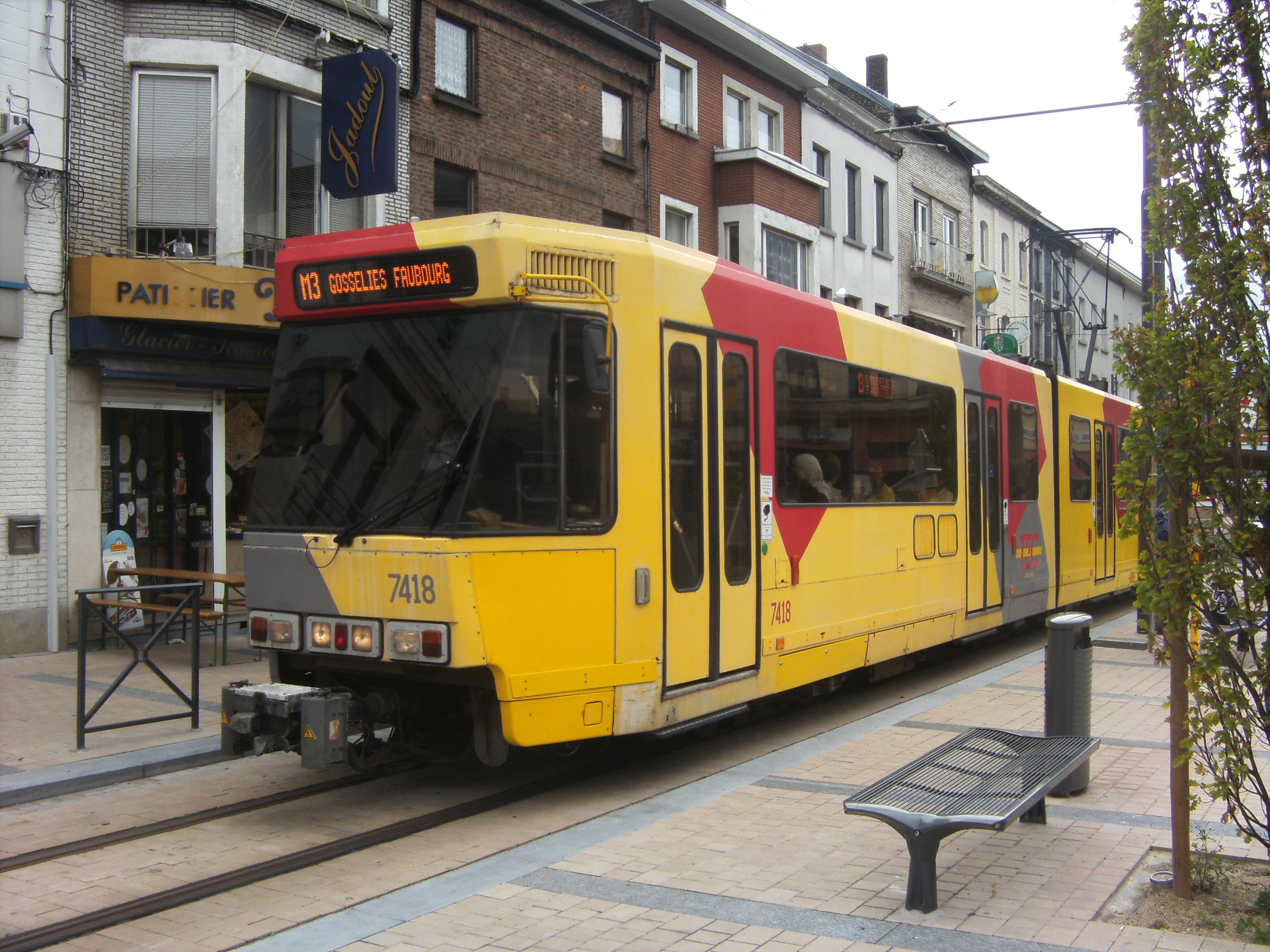
A line 3 tram in Gosselies on the line's opening day.

Line M3 is a line of the Charleroi Metro in Belgium operated by TEC Charleroi, running from Gosselies (north of Charleroi) to the loop around downtown Charleroi, before heading back to Gosselies.

Line M3 was inaugurated on 22 June 2013 (11 years ago) and replaced a number of bus lines running between the two suburbs. Introduction of new line numbers (M1, M2, M3 and M4) in February 2012 coincided with the formal association of colors to line numbers. The official color for Line M3 is yellow.

== Operations ==
Line M3 has a length of 15 kilometres (9.3 mi) (including the loops in both Charleroi and Gosselies), running both on light metro and tramway infrastructures. It has 18 stations on the tram portion of the line.

Trams drive on the right for the full journey.

Trams on Line M3 run from 05:00 until 20:00 with frequencies of:

- Every 10 minutes from Monday to Friday except public holidays.
- Every 15 minutes on Saturdays except public holidays.
- Every 20 minutes on Sundays and public holidays.

=== Replacement night bus service ===
A replacement bus service, similarly numbered M3ab on timetables (with "ab" standing for "autobus"), operates with roughly the same itinerary, from 20:00 to 23:00.

== List of stations ==
=== Tram stops ===
The following tram stops are found on the northern portion of the M3 line:

- Faubourg de Bruxelles
- Rue du Chemin de Fer
- Emailleries
- City Nord
- Chuassée de Fleurus
- Rue Léopold
- Calvaire
- Bruyerre
- Carrosse
- Madeleine
- Rue Berteau
- Chaussée de Gilly
- Puissant
- Saint Antoine
- Marie Curie
- Deschassis
- La Planche
- Sacré Madame

=== Premetro stations ===
The following stations are found on the full metro portion of the system in central Charleroi:

- Piges
- Ouest
- Villette
- Sud
- Sambre
- Tirou
- Parc
- Janson
- Waterloo
- Beaux-Arts
