= STIC =

STIC or stic may refer to:

- Science and Technology Information Center (Ethiopia)
- STIC Investments, a South Korean venture capital firm
- Standard Television Interface Circuit, a chip for video encoding
- stic.man, American rapper, music producer, activist and author
- Société des Transports Intercommunaux de Charleroi, a public transport company in Belgium
- Santo Tomas Internment Camp, Japanese internment camp for civilians in the Philippines
