= Société des Transports Intercommunaux de Charleroi =

Public transport company in Belgium

STIC
- Company type: Government-owned corporation
- Industry: Public Transport
- Founded: January 1, 1962
- Defunct: 1991
- Fate: Merger
- Headquarters: Charleroi, Belgium
- Products: Public Transport

The Société des Transports Intercommunaux de Charleroi (Charleroi Intercity Transport Company), abbreviated and referred to as STIC, was a company operating a local and regional public transport network in Charleroi, Belgium. The company was active from 1962 until 1991, when it was merged with the Charleroi part of the SNCV to form the TEC Charleroi, the current public transport company in Charleroi.

== History ==
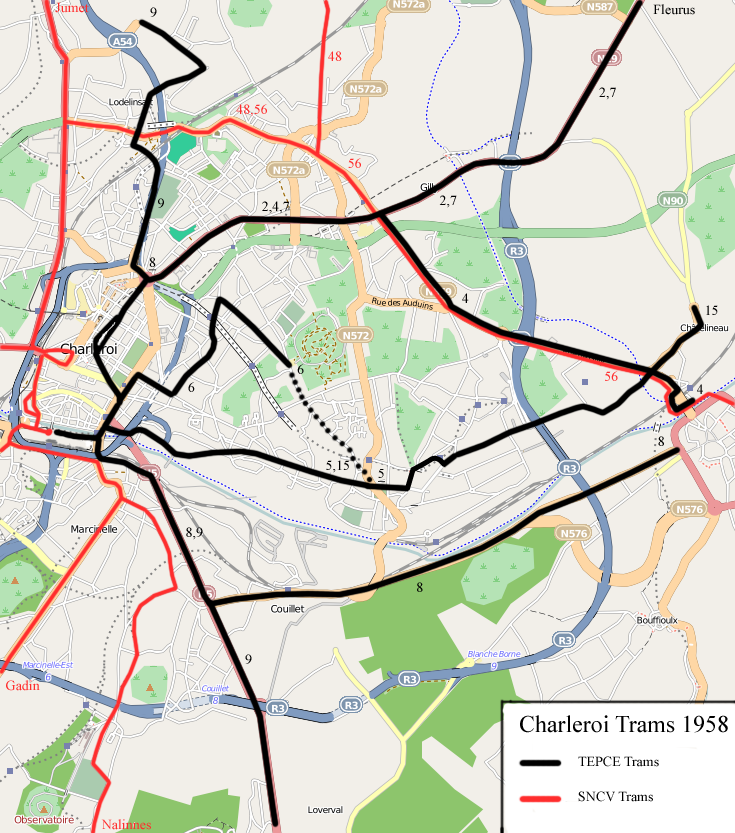
Charleroi tram networks of TEPCE (black) and SNCV (red) in 1958.

=== Tramways Electriques du Pays de Charleroi et Extensions (TEPCE) ===
Charleroi saw its first horse towed tramways in 1881, but it wasn't until 6 years later (1887) that the SNCV began operating three tramway lines in Charleroi. In the meantime, another company, the SCVB (Société des chemins de fer vicinaux belges - Belgian vicinal railways company) had begun operating its own lines. The SCVB contract was transferred to RELSE (Railways Economiques de Liège-Seraing et Extensions) in 1903, which electrified the Charleroi lines and established a subsidiary in 1904 to operate them as TEPCE (Tramways Electriques du Pays de Charleroi et Extensions - Electrical tramways of the Charleroi region and extensions).

TEPCE operated from 1904 until 1961. Because of their distinctive green livery, its trams were soon nicknamed les trams verts (the green trams), and this nickname, which was later also applied to STIC buses, survived until the end of STIC in 1991.

TEPCE also operated a couple of tram lines on behalf of SNCV until 1923.

The TEPCE tramway network reached its heyday just before World War II, with a total length of 67-kilometre (42 mi). The war brought extensive damage to the network and other infrastructure, which was progressively rebuilt. However, the 1950s saw private cars win terrain against public transport, and trams slowly began to be replaced by buses, which were cheaper and more flexible to operate and were perceived as more modern. TEPCE followed the trend and decided to progressively phase out trams to replace them by buses. TEPCE buses also wore a distinctive green/grey livery.

The TEPCE public contract ended in 1961, and a new company, STIC, was created in 1962 to take over operation of the network, which consisted in 8 lines, essentially in Charleroi downtown and eastern suburbs.

=== STIC ===
Network map in year 1990.

STIC operated the former TEPCE tram and bus network from 1 January 1962 until 1991. However, the trend to replace trams by buses continued, and the last STIC tram was put out of service in June 1974.

During the STIC years, SNCV operated its own network of trams and buses in Charleroi (and the rest of Belgium). Both networks complemented each other, more than they competed.

Following an 8 August 1988 law, organization of public transportation in Belgium was transferred from the federal government to regional governments. As an application of this law, a 26 June 1990 law dissolved the SNCV.

As a result, a new Walloon holding company was created (SRWT) in 1991. All public owned transport companies in Wallonia were merged into the new company, including STIC and the Walloon part of the SNCV. Operations were delegated to five local companies known as TEC (Transport en commun - Public transportation). One of those, TEC Charleroi, became responsible for operating the Charleroi part of the SNCV network, as well as the former STIC network.

For a couple of years, STIC green buses continued to be seen in the streets of Charleroi with TEC stickers. Both the SNCV and STIC networks and fares were immediately integrated, and buses were progressively repainted in TEC livery.

=== Heritage ===
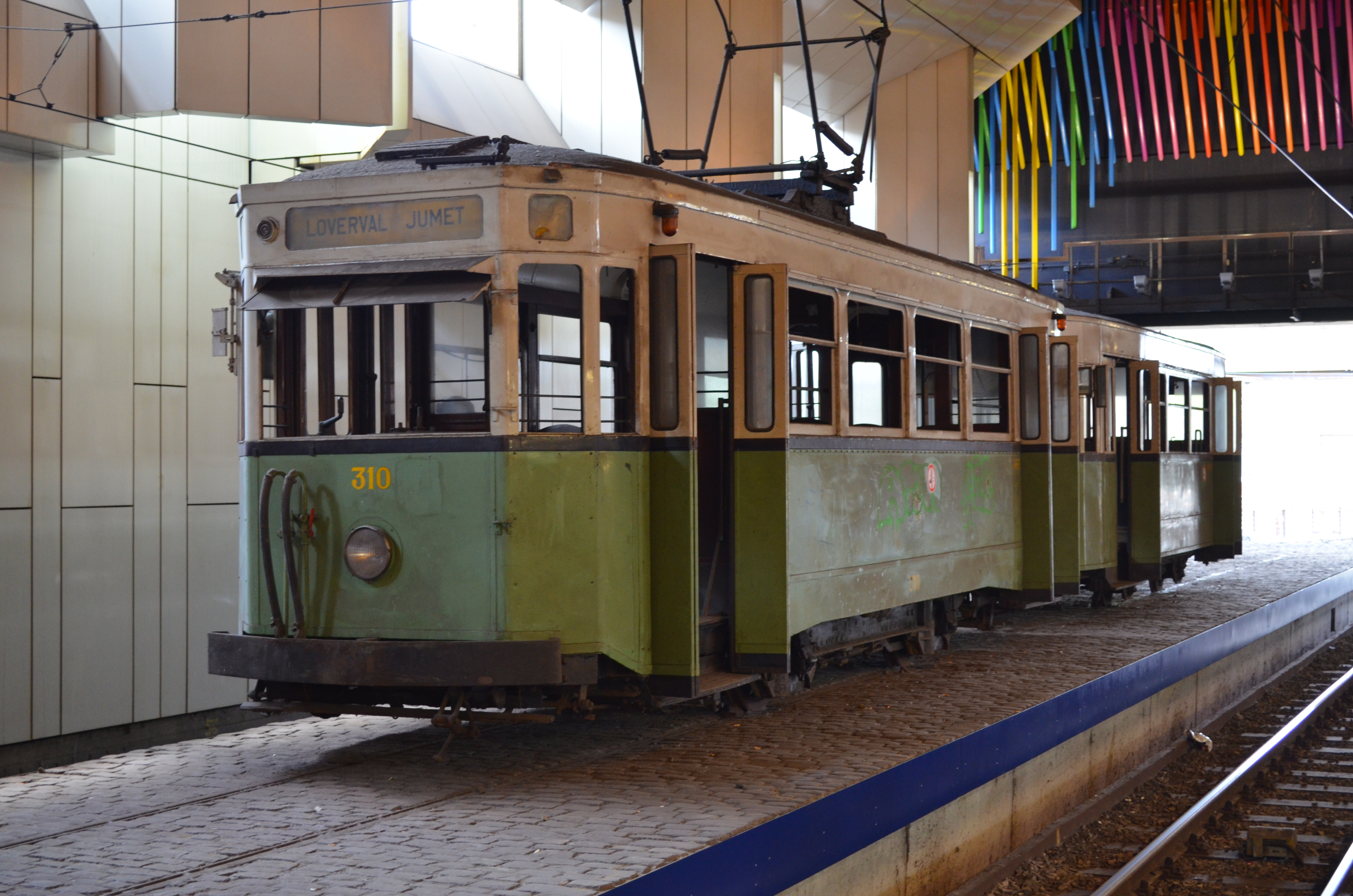
TEPCE/STIC tram in Beaux-Arts station

As there was no overlap between SNCV and STIC line numbers, both were kept after the merger. Some of today's TEC bus line numbers are inherited from the STIC days, particularly in eastern Charleroi. Examples of this include lines 1, 3, 4, 7, 8, 10, 11, 12, 13, 14, 17, 18, 25, 35, 37, 722 and E.

The Beaux-Arts metro station in downtown Charleroi exhibits an old green STIC tram.

== See also ==
- Charleroi Metro
- Société Régionale Wallonne du Transport
- Vicinal tramway
