= Digue Square =

Square in Charleroi, Belgium

Coordinates: 50.40954999531097°N 4.43810909986496°E

La Digue Square
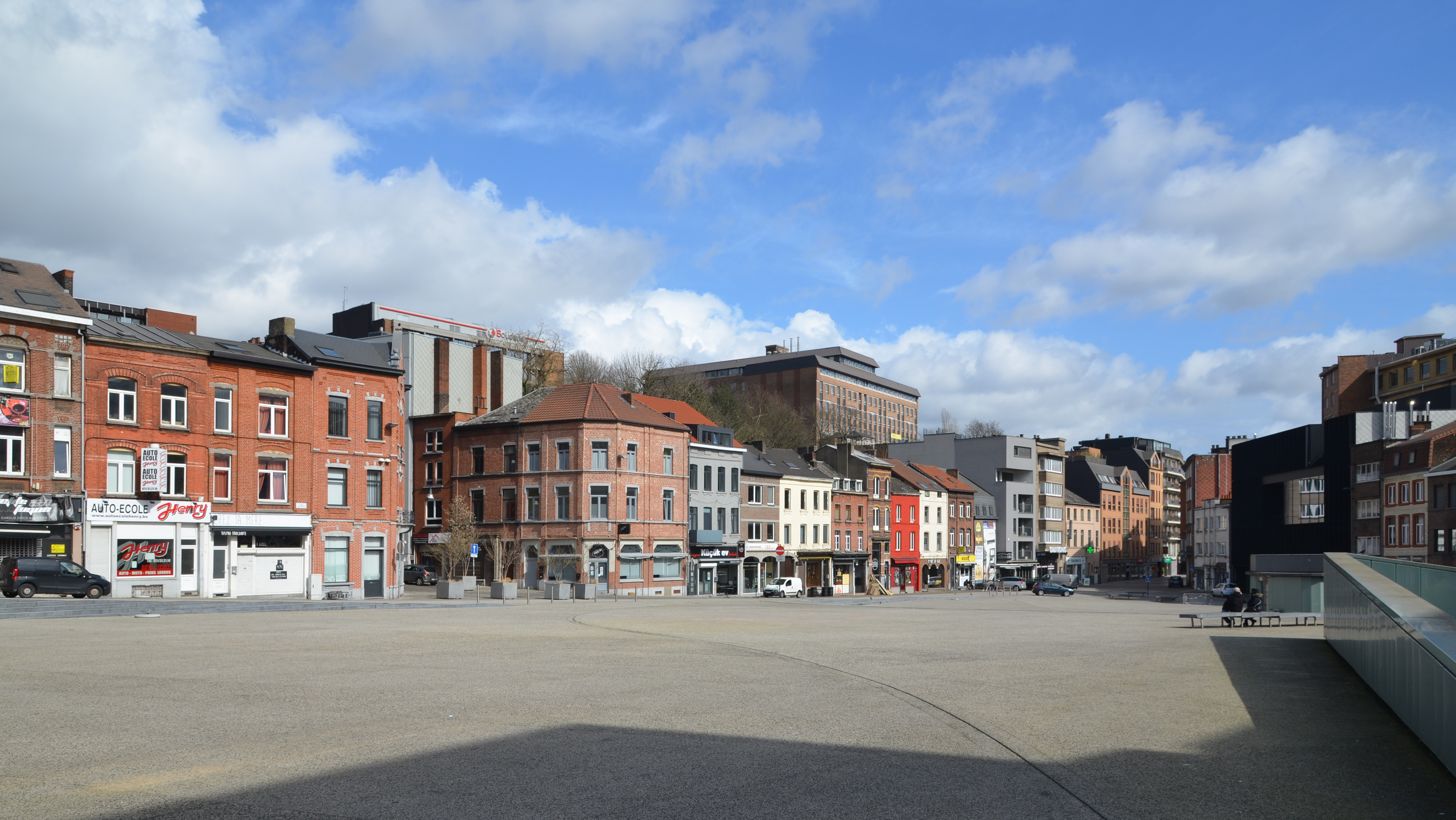
- La Digue Square seen from Grand-Central Street towards Dampremy Street. In the high background, the Mutualite Solidaris building on Alliés Avenue and the Institut Saint-Joseph on l'Yser Boulevard.

- Location within Belgium
- Type: Square
- Location: Wallonia
- Arrondissement: Charleroi
- Quarter: Ville-Basse
- From: Dampremy Street
- To: Grand Central Street

Construction
- Inauguration: c. 1870 c. 1930 extension 2014 creation of an underground parking lot

The Digue Square and Digue Street are located in the lower town of Charleroi, Belgium.

The triangular-shaped square rises from Dampremy Street in the east to Grand Central Street in the west. Before the works, it was a paved parking lot; since May 2014, it has been a pedestrian space above an underground parking lot.

The street climbs from Digue Square towards Alliés Avenue, a little further north.

== History ==
They owe their name to the dike built to close off the valley of the Lodelinsart stream, creating an artificial pond to help protect the Charleroi fortress.

The fortress was partially dismantled by Louis XV in 1748. After the Battle of Waterloo (1815), the Dutch built a new, larger fortress. When this fortress was still protecting the city (from 1815 to 1870), the future square was a built-up island surrounded by three streets: l'Hôpital Street (to the north), Tonneliers Street (to the south) and Digue Street (to the west). This block occupied around a third of the square's current area.

Rue de l'Hôpital took its name from the civil hospital that ran alongside it from 1844 to 1937, when it was demolished to make way for a school building in 1939. Prior to 1860, this street was known as Vieux-Fours Street, because the town's former communal ovens were located here. The street became Dampremy Street in 1919, the name of the street it was an extension of.

Rue des Tonneliers was the site of Charleroi's first public Protestant place of worship.

Following the dismantling of the fortress (1867–1871), a vast space became available, and a square opened up to the west of the islet, which was named Digue Square. Digue Street, known for a time as Charles Dupre Streett before taking on its present name in 1897, was extended into a new avenue, Avenue du Viaduc, before being renamed Avenue des Alliés in 1921.

The block, made up of insalubrious and, for the most part, old-built dwellings, was called "Sâle Dèbout" (dirty end, in French) by the inhabitants. In the early 1930s, this "Sâle Dèbout" was demolished and the square extended from Grand Central Street to Dampremy Street.

For many years, the square was the site of a Sunday market for horses, piglets, goats and sheep, as well as a morning market for market gardeners.

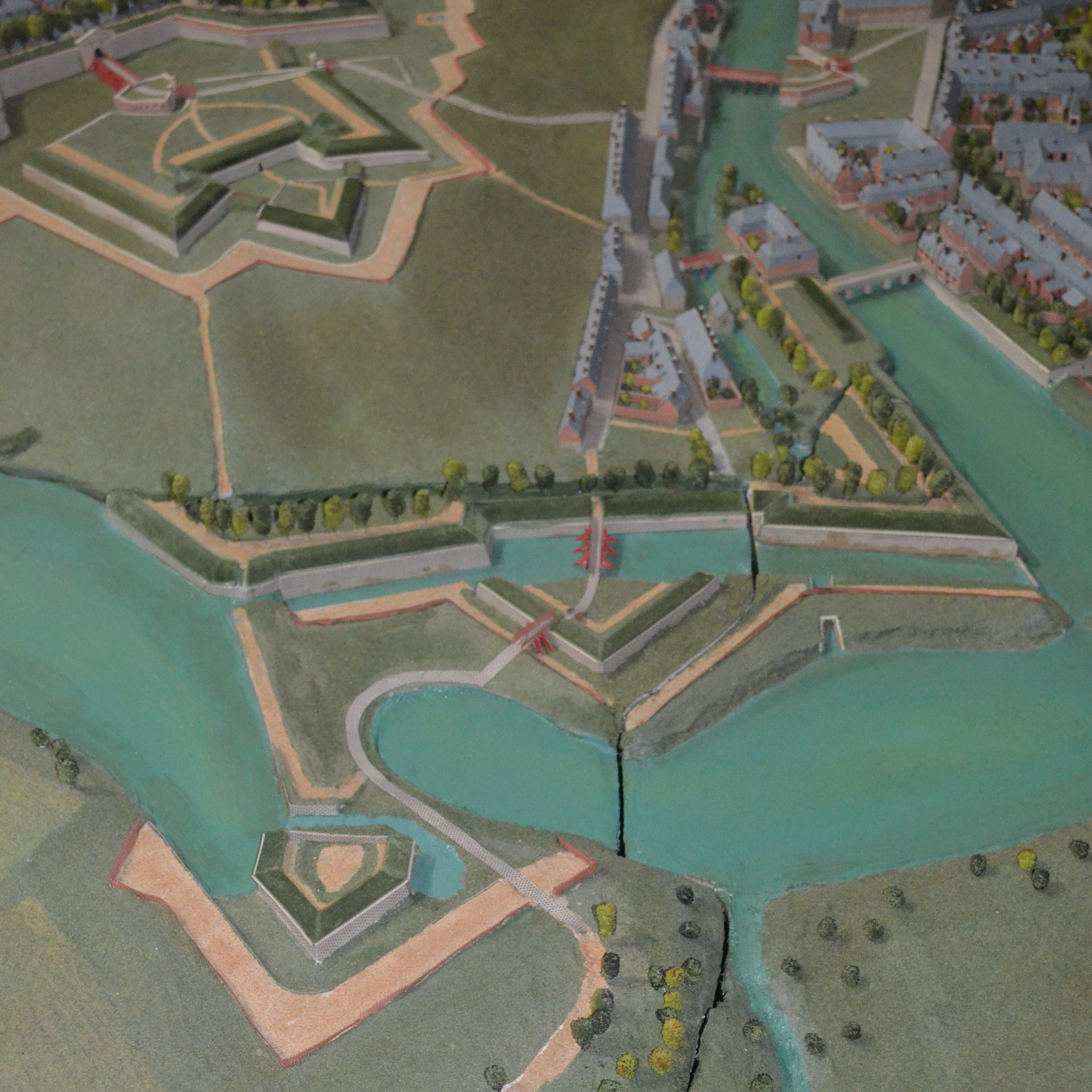
Copy of the Charleroi relief plan of 1696. On the left, the dike closing off the great flood of the Lodelinsart brook valley. In the center, the half-moon and the bridge to the Porte de Dampremy.

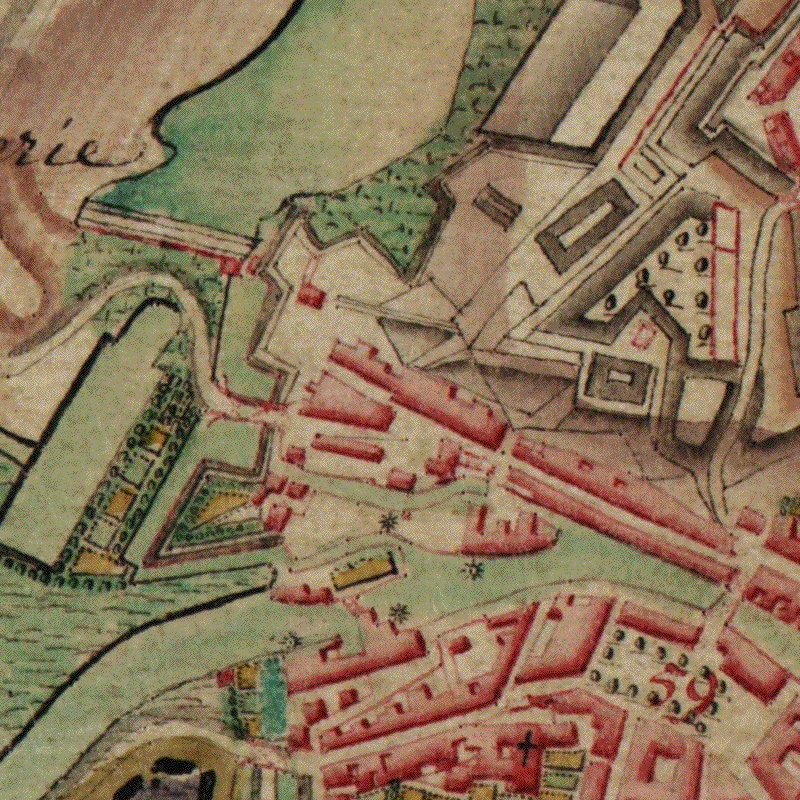
Map drawn around 1775 by Joseph de Ferraris. At top left, the pond and dike that gave its name to the future square.

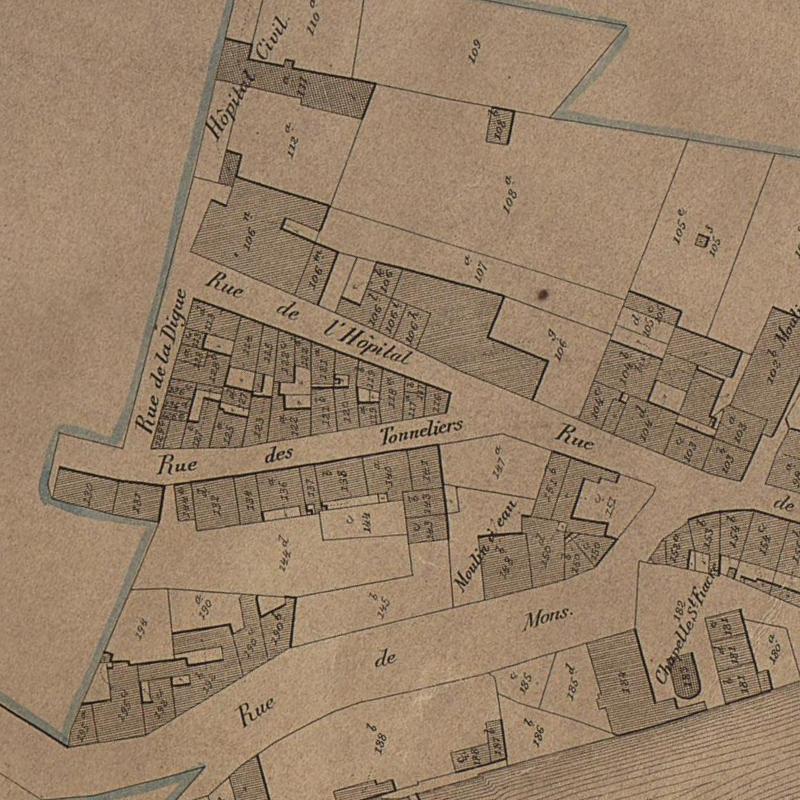
Circa 1865. Extract from the Popp plan.

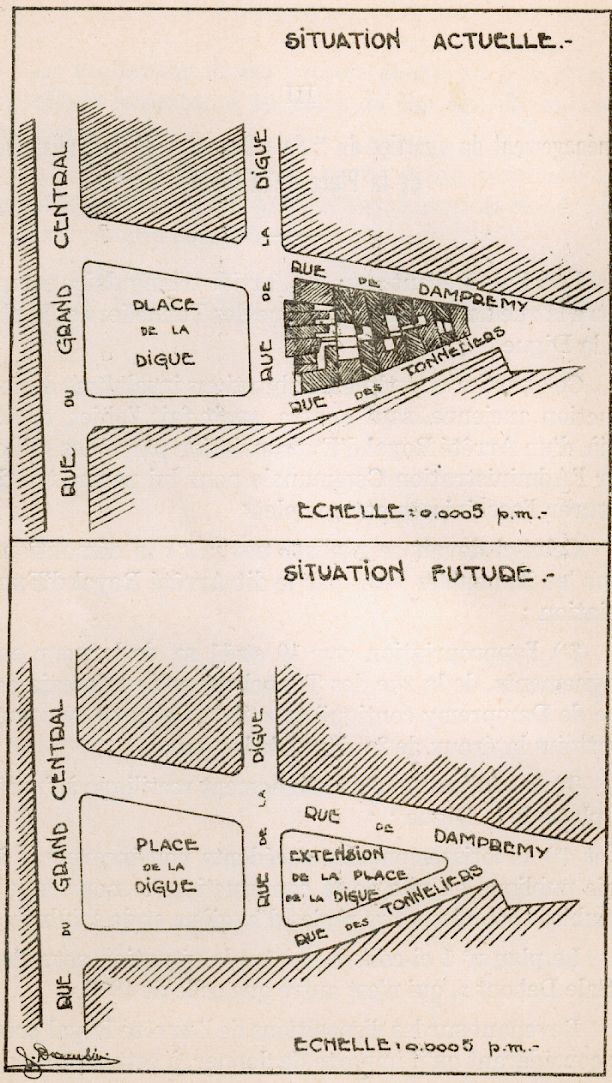
Plan from 1927. The "current situation" on the plan is that before the demolition of the block, while the "future situation" is that after 1933.

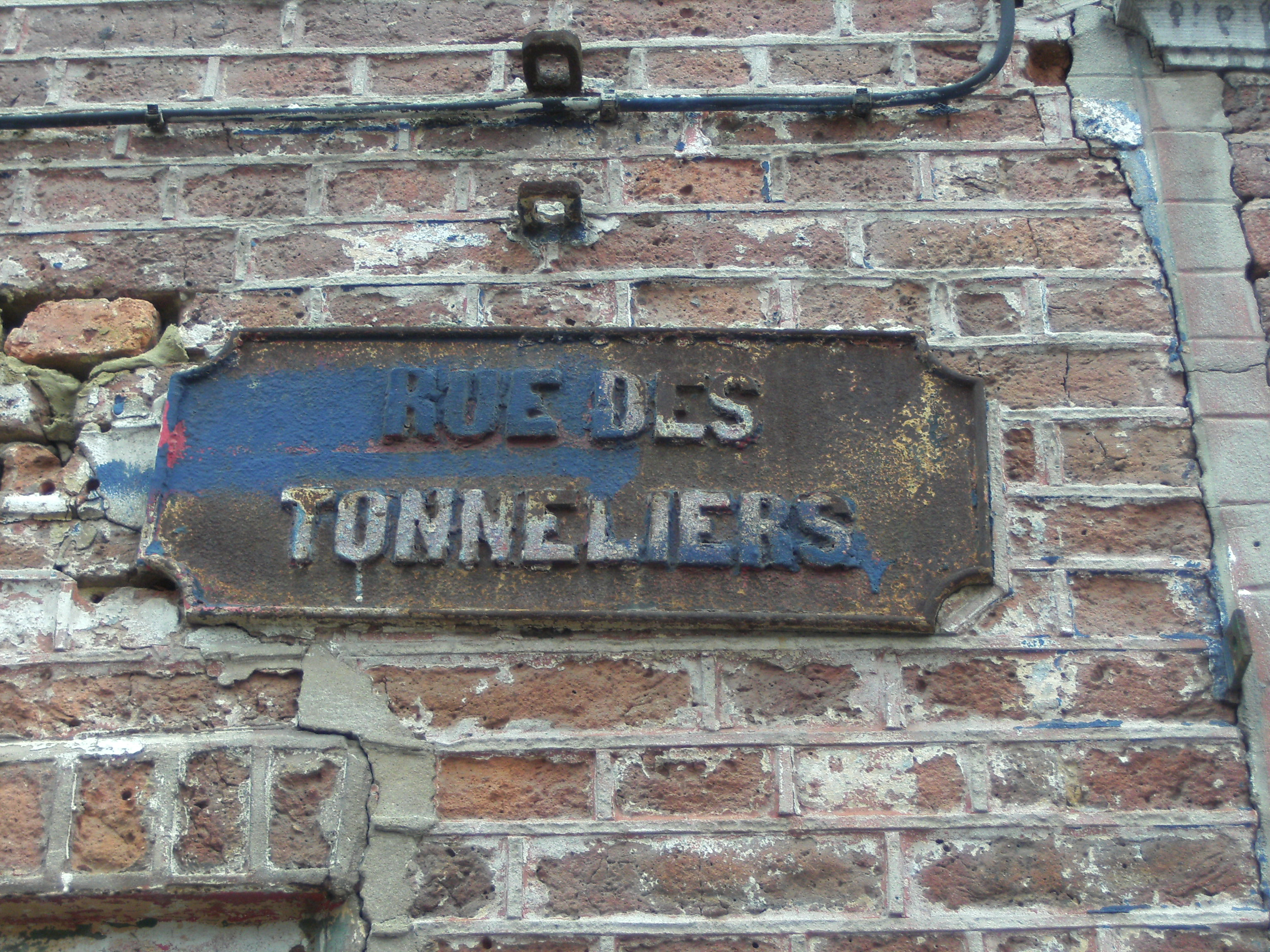
Plaque at number 19 of Digue Square. Tonneliers Street ran alongside the "Sâle Dèbout". The plaque is opposite Digue Street, at the former corner of the "Sâle Dèbout".

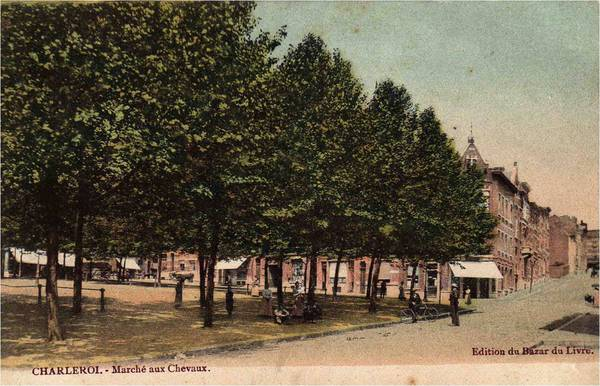
Digue Square and Digue Street. Postcard from the early 20th century.

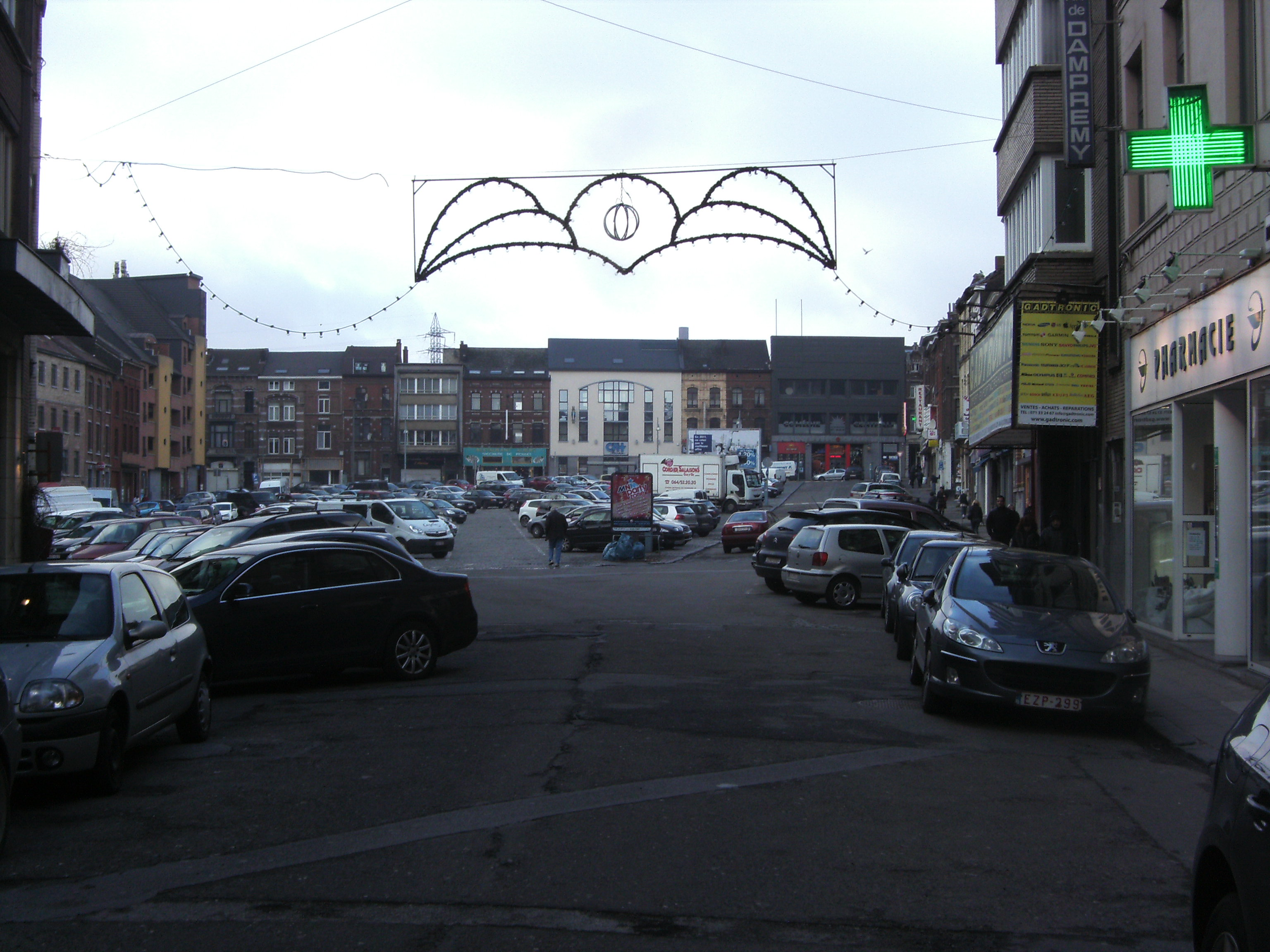
The square before the 2011 works, seen from Dampremy Street.

== 2010s renovation ==
Long abandoned by the public authorities despite numerous announcements, the "Projet Phénix", with the help of European funds, has enabled a thorough overhaul of the Digue Square. It has become a pedestrian area above an underground parking lot. Work began in late February 2011 and was completed on May 3, 2014.

== French fortress and "Sâle dèbout" revealed ==
Remains of Vauban's fortress have come to light during excavation work in 2011.

The main element is a section of curtain wall forming a pincer that crosses the excavation from north to south over a total length of 73m. It is built of rubble stones bonded with lime mortar. It is fitted with a dozen buttresses and rests on an earthen bank inside the town. The exterior is clad in carefully crafted sandstone. This is the longest section of the French fortified wall observed to date.

A section of the counterscarp wall, parallel to the curtain wall, shows the rear face of the Dampremy ravelin, which originally protected the gate of the same name.

Between the two was a drowned ditch spanned by a bridge. The bridge's five piers, some of which have been preserved, are made of large, carefully dressed rubble stone.

The eastern part of the square reveals a group of houses created in the late 17th century and which evolved until the 20th century. Here, the relief plan shows terraced houses with gardens that follow the triangular shape of the square. Subsequently, the plots were subdivided. However, despite the major modifications made over the course of two centuries, the whole respects the boundaries of the original plot. This is evidenced by the replacement of old walls in more recent constructions. It was this block, known as "Sâle Dèbout", that was demolished in the early 1930s.

The urgency of the work, subsidized by European funds, meant that the remains could not be preserved. However, metal nails mark the curtain wall on the ground.

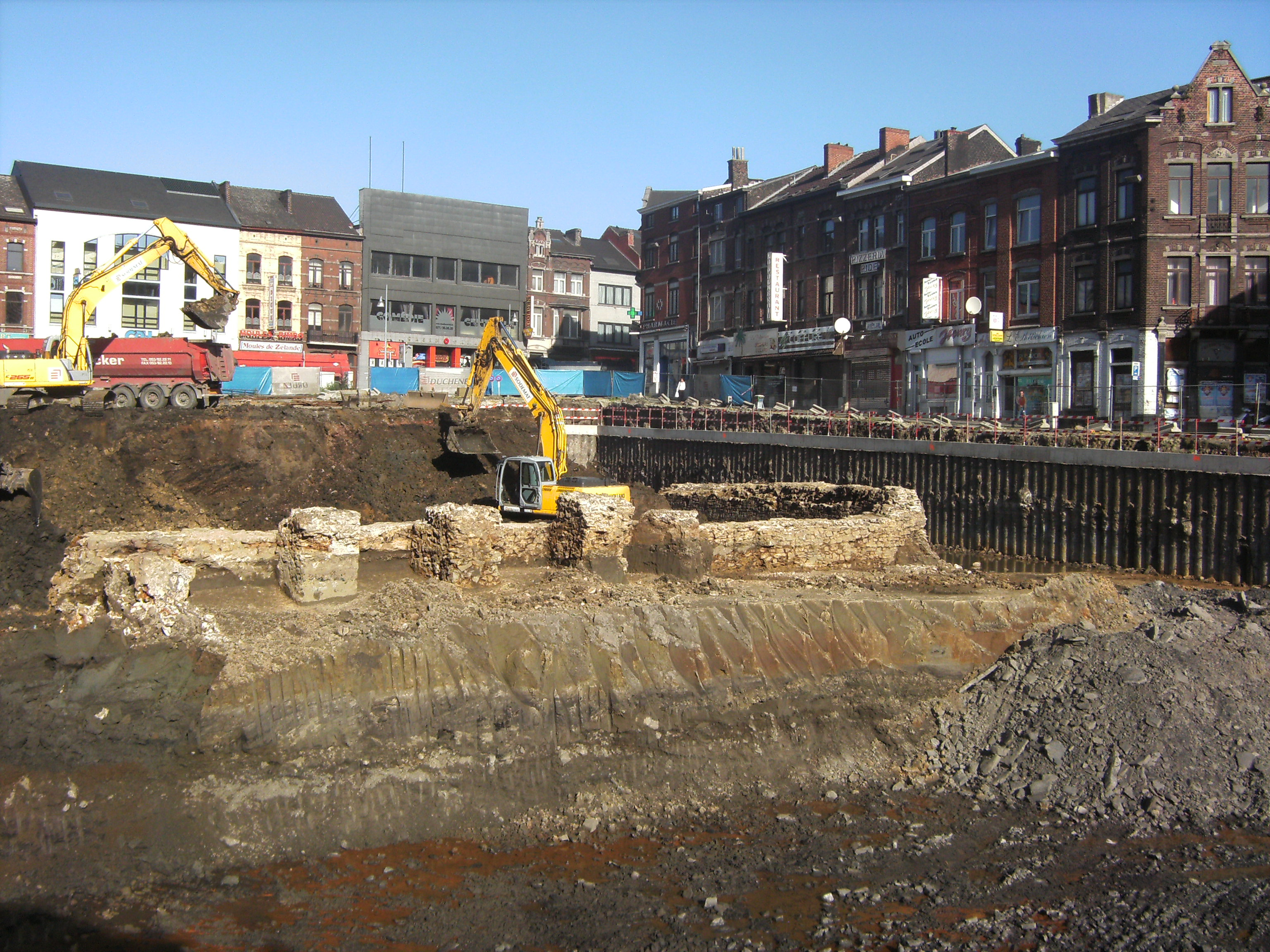
View from the east: curtain wall with buttresses that rested on an earthen embankment towards the town's interior.

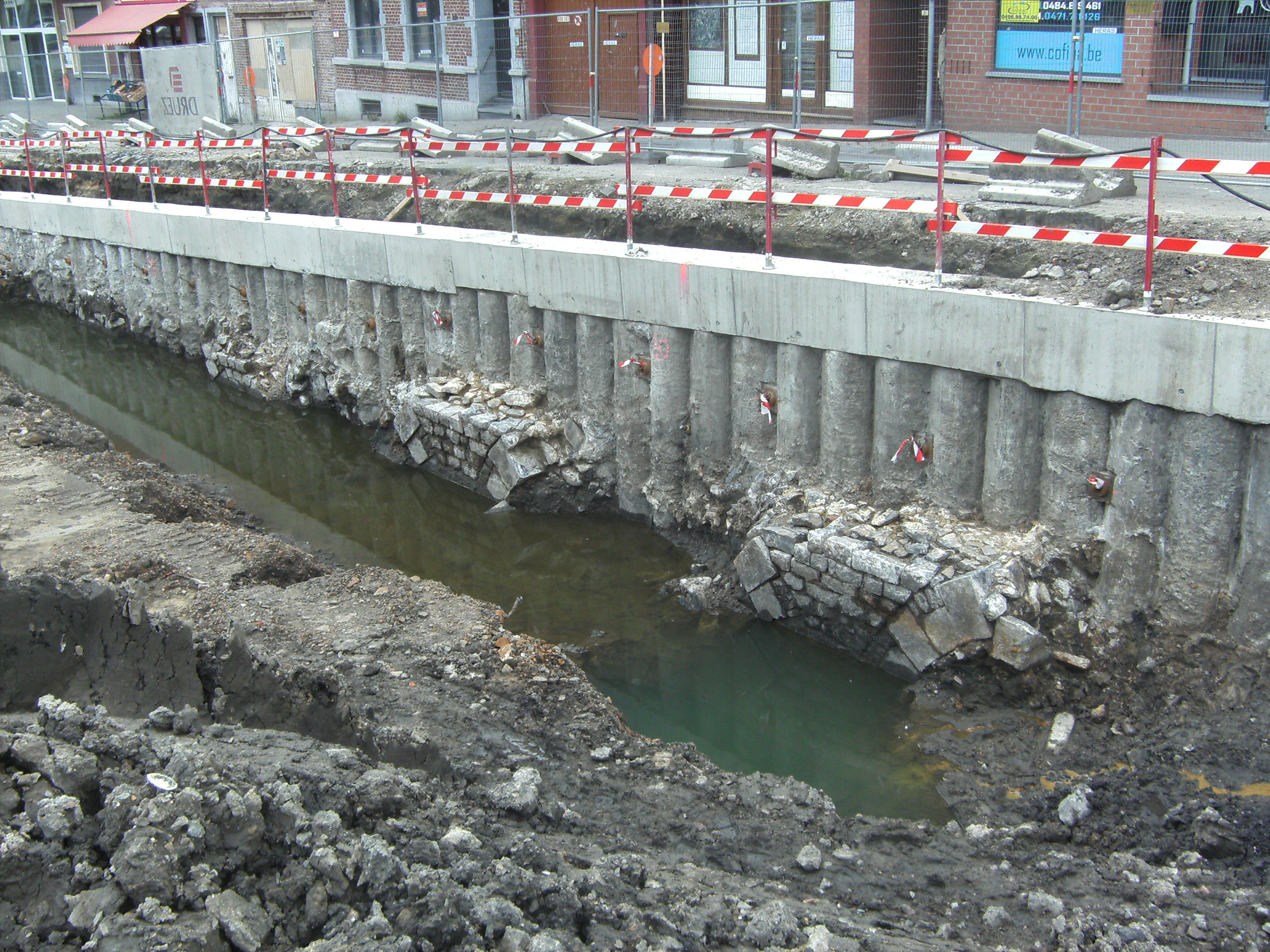
Remains of bridge piers spanning the ditch.

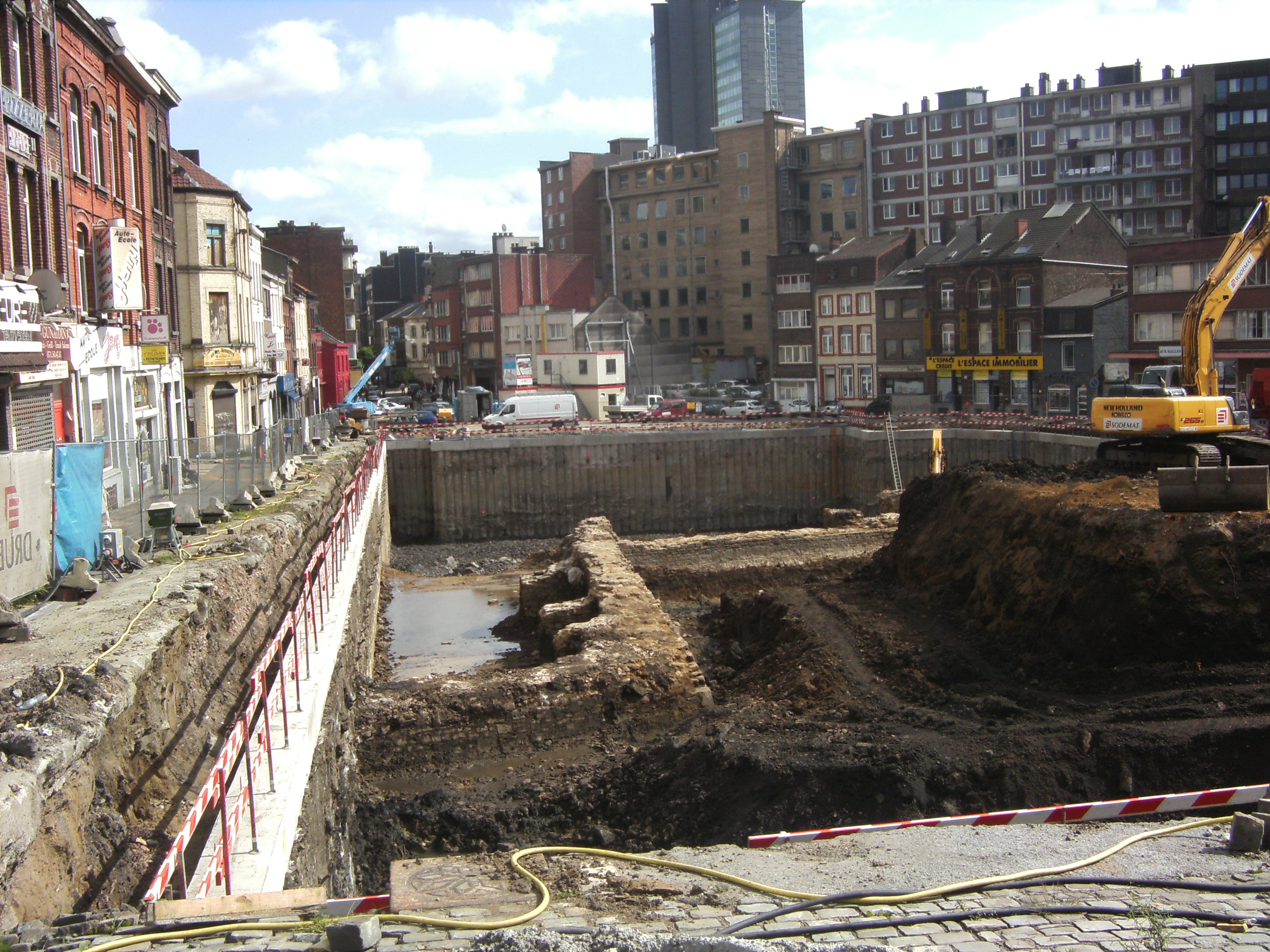
Curtain wall, seen from the west, outside the town.

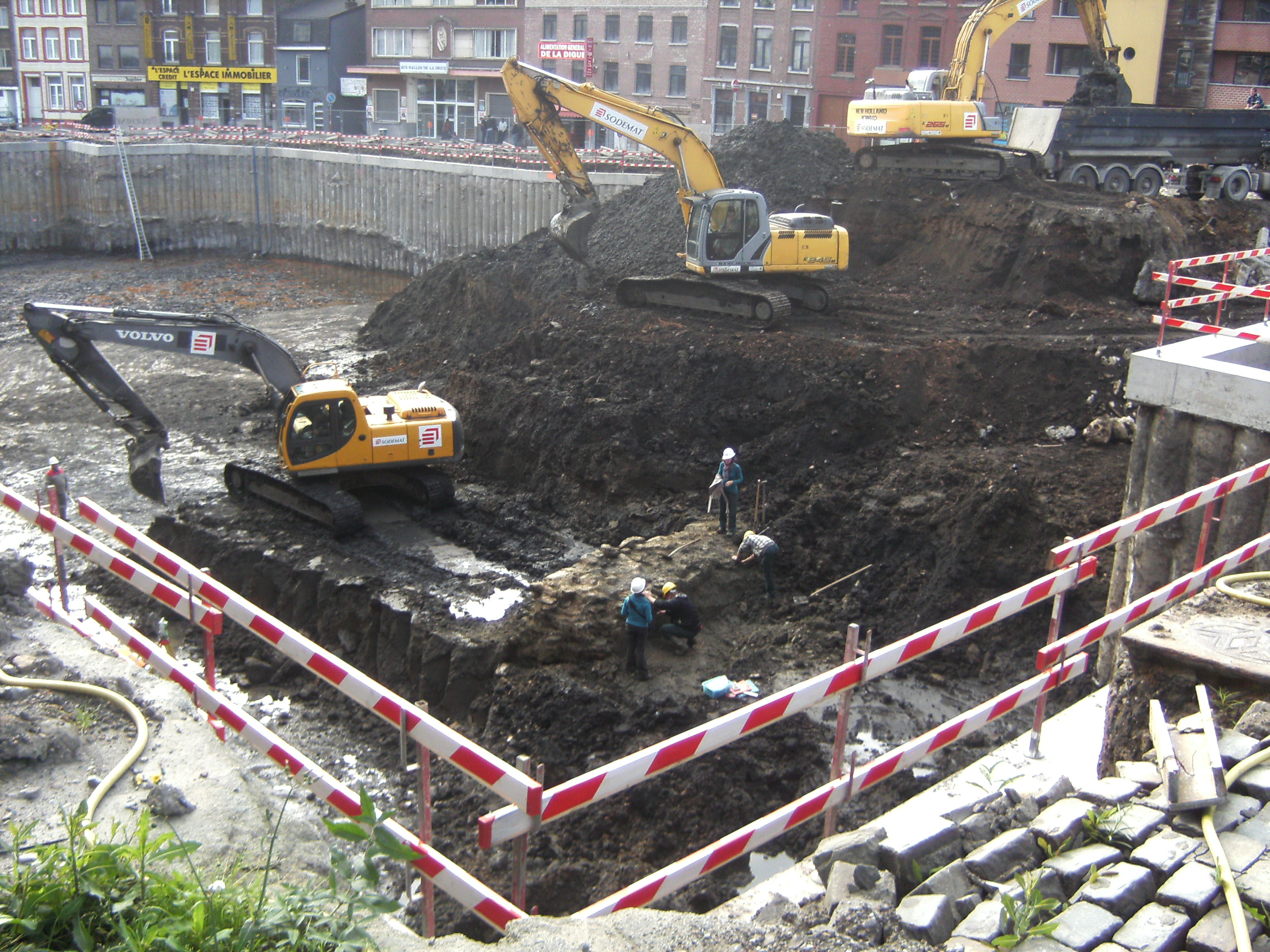
Archaeologists clear the counterscarp amidst the construction machinery.

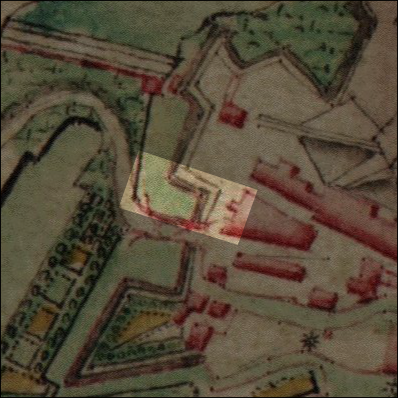
Approximate location of the excavation on the Ferraris map.

== Bibliography ==
- Inauguration des grands travaux par L.L.M.M. le Roi et la Reine le dimanche 22 juin 1930 : Notices descriptives des travaux, Charleroi, Ville de Charleroi, 1930
- Maurice-A. Arnould, Le plan relief de Charleroi, Bruxelles, Crédit Communal, coll. « Histoire in-4° », 1986, 68 p. (ISBN 2-87193-006-6)
- Jean Everard, Monographie des rues de Charleroi, Charleroi, Collins, 1959, 223 p., In-12
- Jean Fichefet, Charleroi : Étude de Géographie urbaine, Charleroi, Librairie de la Bourse, 1935, 218 p.
- Lecomte, Aurélie (2012). "Place de la Digue : mise au jour des fortifications françaises de Charleroi (xviie siècle)" [Place de la Digue: uncovering of the French fortifications of Charleroi (17th century)] (PDF). La Lettre du Patrimoine (in French) (28). Namur, Belgium: Institut du Patrimoine: 6.
- Lecomte, Aurélie (2013). "Charleroi : suivi archéologique des travaux menés place de la Digue : Fortification française et quartier d'habitat" [Charleroi: archaeological monitoring of the work carried out at Place de la Digue: French fortification and residential district]. Chronique de l'archéologie wallonne (in French) (20). Jambes, Belgium: Département du patrimoine du service public de Wallonie: 111–114. ISBN 978-2-930711-02-7. ISSN 1370-5202.
- Philippe Mac Kay, Marianne Bruneau et Denis Gauvain, Charleroi d'hier et d'aujourd'hui : Rue par rue, Charleroi, coll. « Un dossier de La Nouvelle Gazette », October 1996
- Philippe Nonclercq, Charleroy autrefois : ses rues, ses quartiers, son histoire, Liège, Noir Dessin Production, 2016, 276 p. (ISBN 978-2-87351-329-0).
- Espace Environnement, Étude et analyse du projet d'aménagement de la place de la Digue, Charleroi, 26 p., Charleroi, Ville de Charleroi, 1930
