= Dampremy =

Dampremy Dårmè (Walloon)
- Former municipality of Belgium
- Coat of arms

- Location in the municipality of Charleroi

- Location in Belgium
- Coordinates: 50°24′N 4°26′E
- Country: Belgium
- Region: Wallonia
- Community: French Community
- Province: Hainaut
- Municipality: Charleroi

Area
  - Total: 1.07 sq mi (2.77 km^{2})

Population (2001)
  - Total: 8,566
- Time zone: UTC+1 (CET)
  - Summer (DST): UTC+2 (CEST)
- Postal code: 6020
- Area code: 071

Dampremy (Walloon: Dårmè) is a town of Wallonia and district of the municipality of Charleroi, located in the province of Hainaut, Belgium.

It was a municipality of its own before the fusion of the Belgian municipalities in 1977.

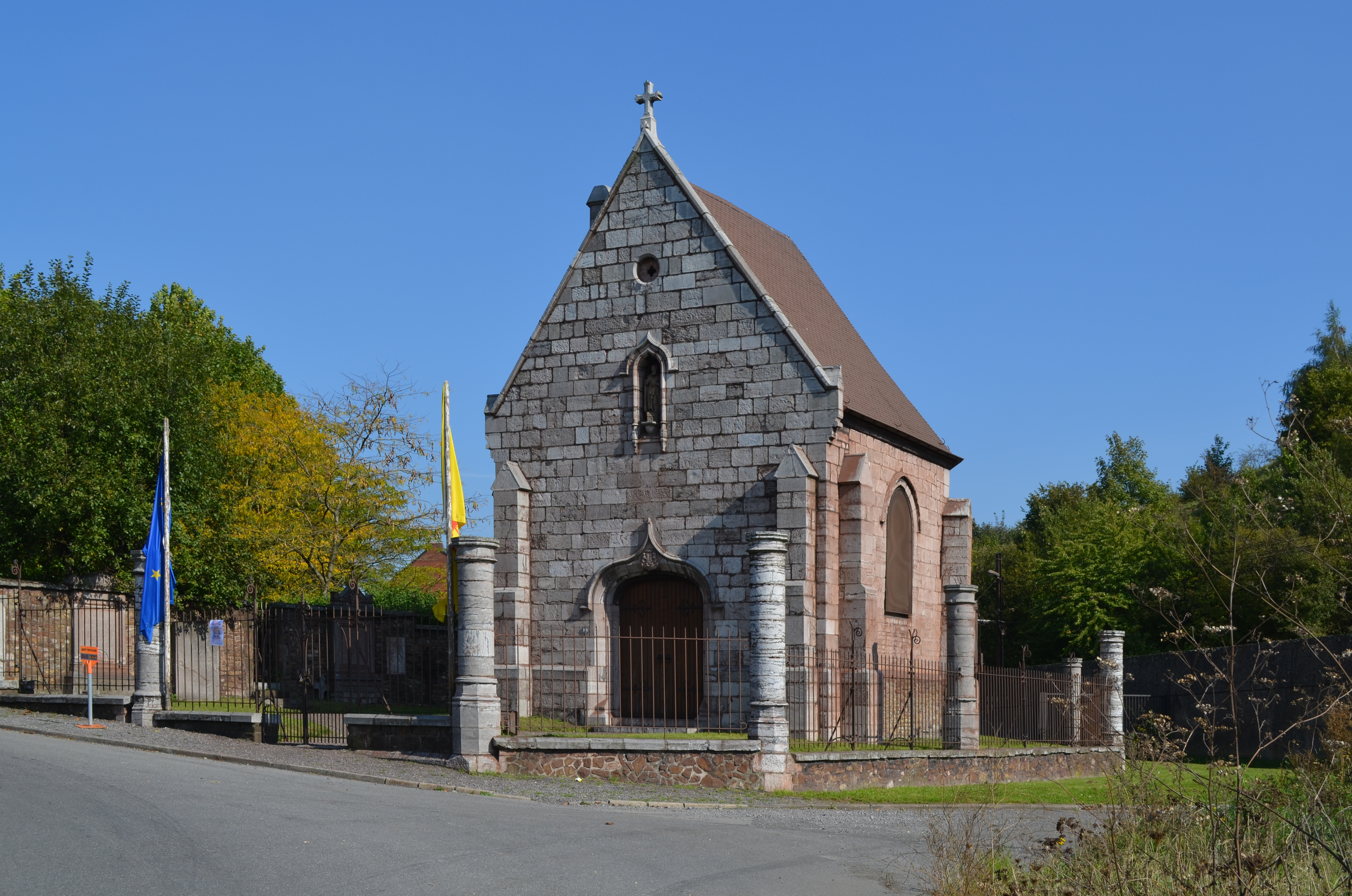
Saint-Ghislain chapel.

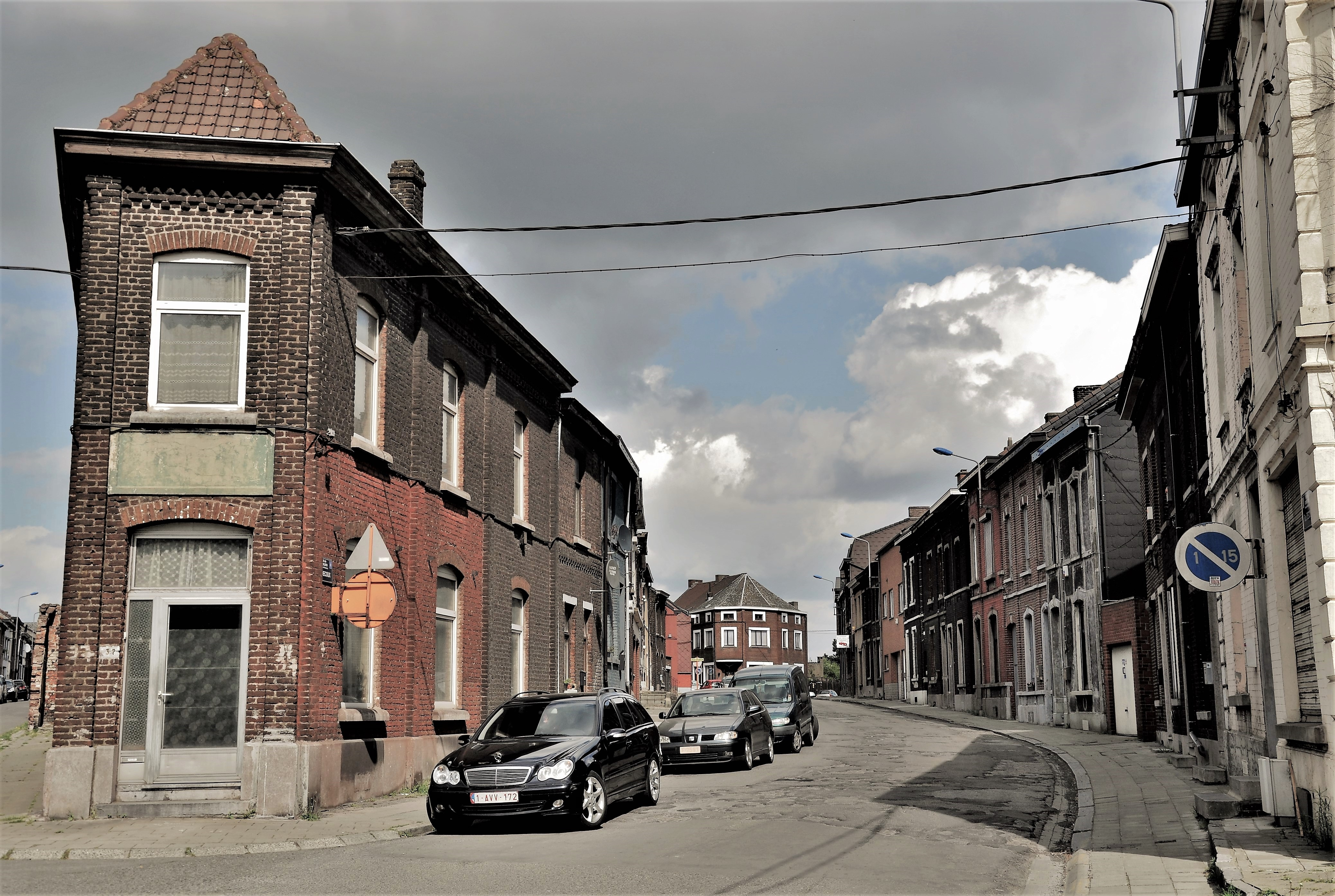
Rue Arthur Decoux

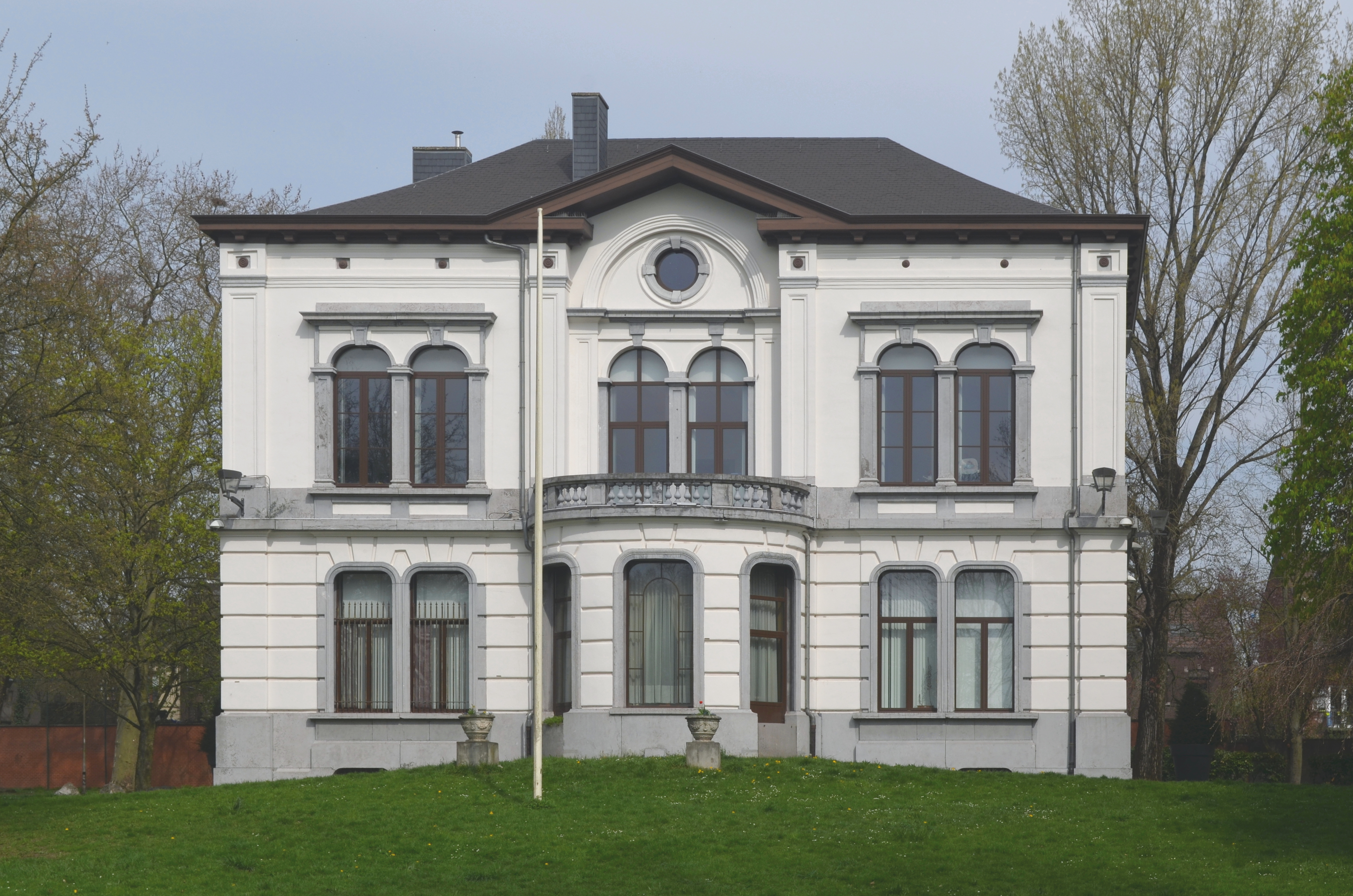
Former town hall.
