= Soleilmont metro station =

Metro station in Gilly, Belgium

Soleilmont

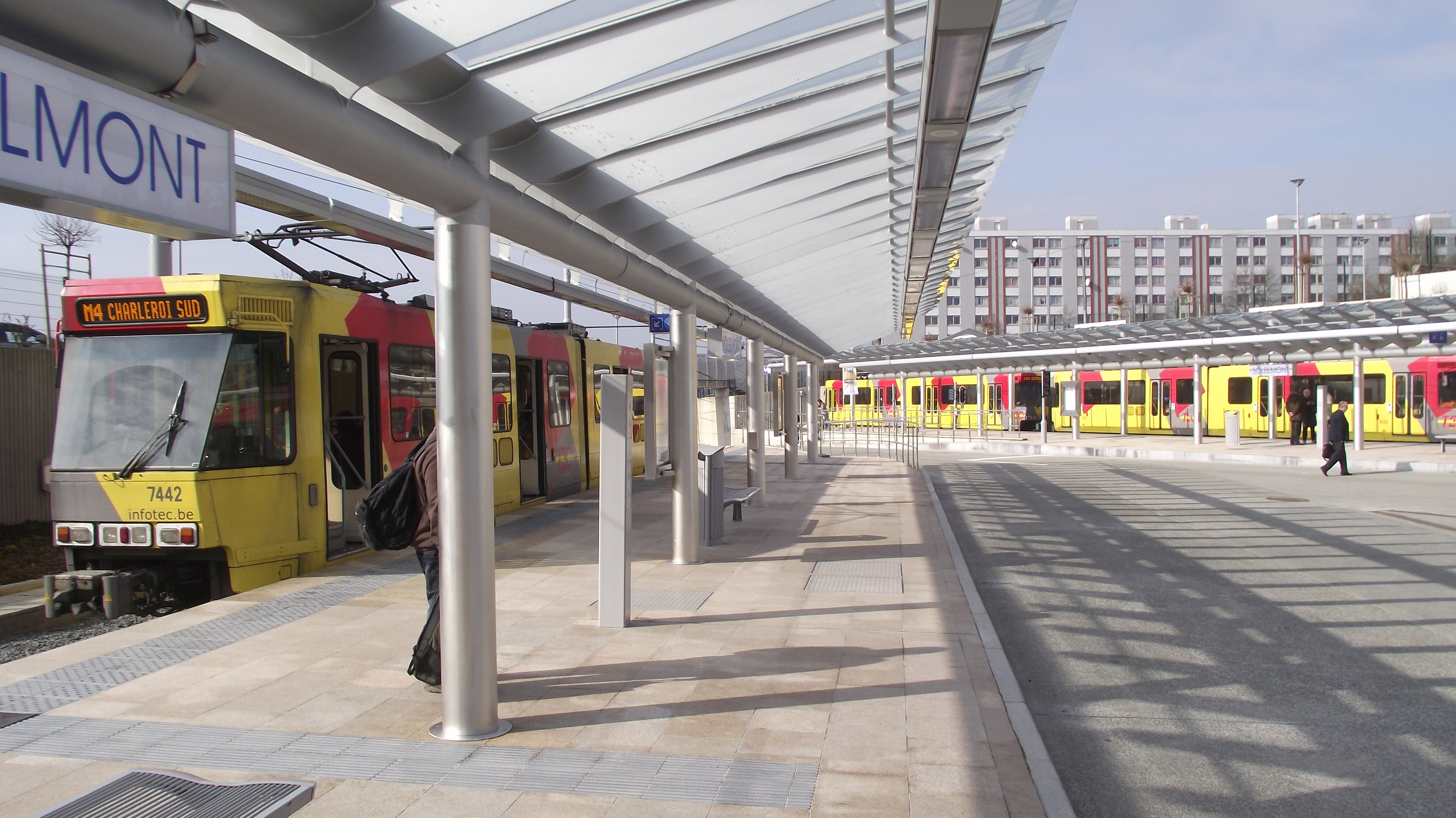

General information
- Coordinates: 50°25′49″N 4°30′10″E
- Transit authority: TEC Charleroi
- Platforms: One for arrivals, one for departures (shared with buses)
- Tracks: 2
- Bus routes: 6
- Bus operators: TEC Charleroi

Construction
- Depth: Surface
- Platform levels: 1
- Parking: Yes (P+R - 200 spaces)

Other information
- Fare zone: 2

History
- Opened: 27 February 2012

Services
Preceding station	Charleroi Metro	Following station
Sart-Culpart towards Sud	M4	Terminus
Location

Soleilmont (French pronunciation: [sɔlɛjmɔ̃]) is a Charleroi Metro station located in Gilly, Belgium (part of the Charleroi municipality), opened on 27 February 2012 as part of the Soleilmont extension of the Gilly branch of the Charleroi Metro. The station, built at ground level, is the terminus of the Gilly branch (line M4) and is an intermodal transport hub served by trams and buses and featuring a 200 spaces car park.

The station is located in TEC Charleroi fare zone 2.

As the terminus of the Gilly branch of the network, the station features a loop track allowing trams to make a U-turn to start their journey back to Charleroi.

== Nearby points of interest ==
The station is located in a mixed residential/commercial area of Gilly (the Soleilmont neighbourhood).

== Interchange ==
TEC Charleroi bus lines 17, 25, 62, 710, E83 and M4ab.

== See also ==
- List of Charleroi Metro stations
