= Charleroi-Central railway station =

Railway station in Hainaut, Belgium

Charleroi-Central
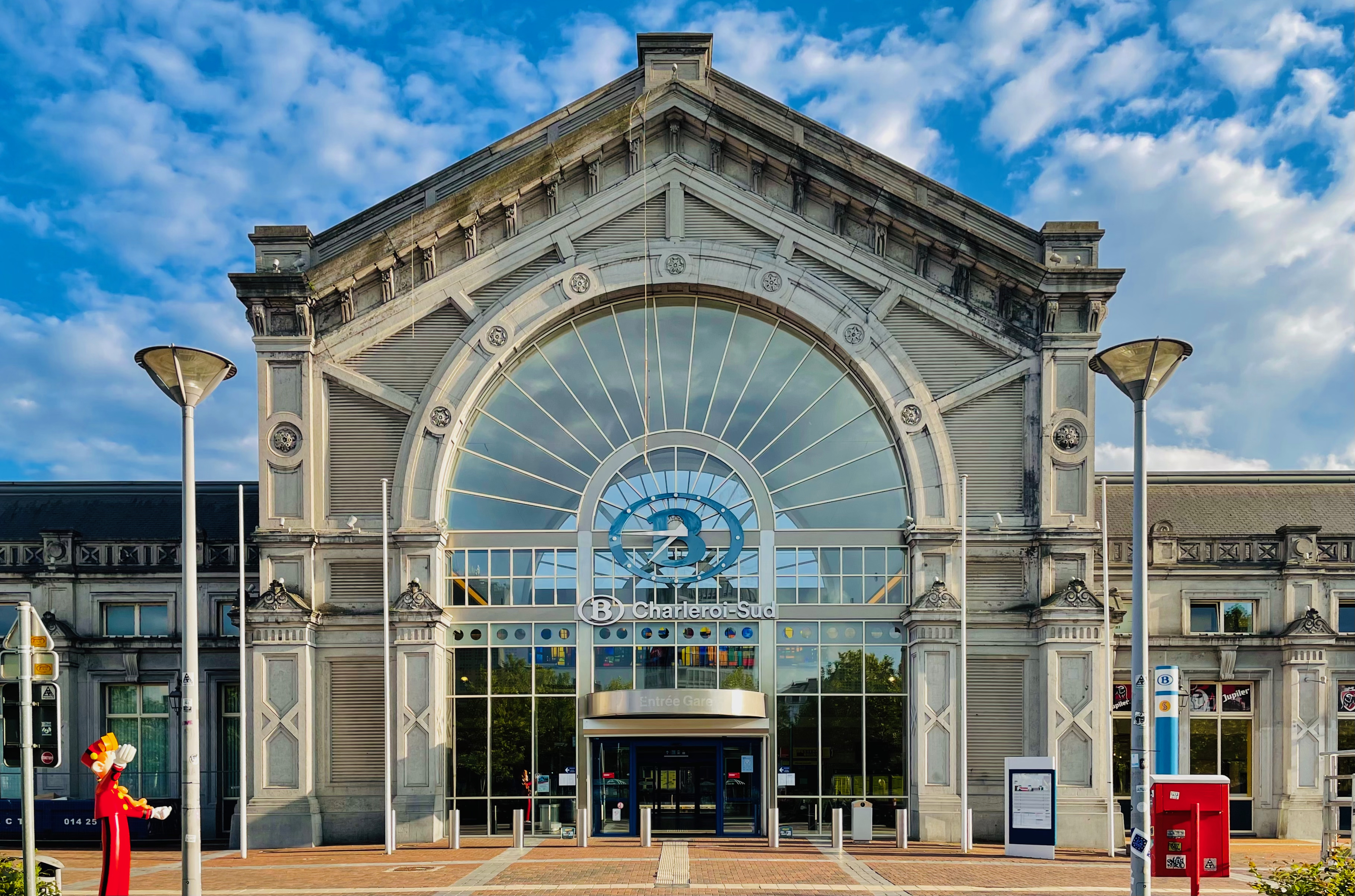
- Charleroi-Central railway station

General information
- Location: Square des Martyrs du 18 août, 6000 Charleroi; Belgium
- Coordinates: 50°24′17″N 4°26′19″E
- System: Railway Station
- Owner: SNCB/NMBS
- Operator: SNCB/NMBS
- Lines: 117, 118, 124, 130, 130A, 132, 130, 140
- Platforms: 11
- Tracks: 12

Other information
- Station code: FCR

History
- Opened: 1843; 183 years ago
- Former names: Charleroi-South
Location
- Location within Belgium Location within Europe

Charleroi-Central railway station (French: Gare de Charleroi-Central; Dutch: Station Charleroi-Centraal) (Note: Officially Charleroi-Central (French: Charleroi-Central; Dutch: Charleroi-Centraal)) is the main railway station serving Charleroi, Hainaut, Belgium. It is operated by the National Railway Company of Belgium (SNCB/NMBS). It was formerly called Charleroi-South railway station (French: Gare de Charleroi-Sud; Dutch: Station Charleroi-Zuid) (Note: Officially Charleroi-Sud (French: Charleroi-Sud; Dutch: Charleroi-Zuid)) until December 2022.

Charleroi-Central is also the main TEC bus station in Charleroi, and a station of the Charleroi Metro.

== History ==
=== Early history ===
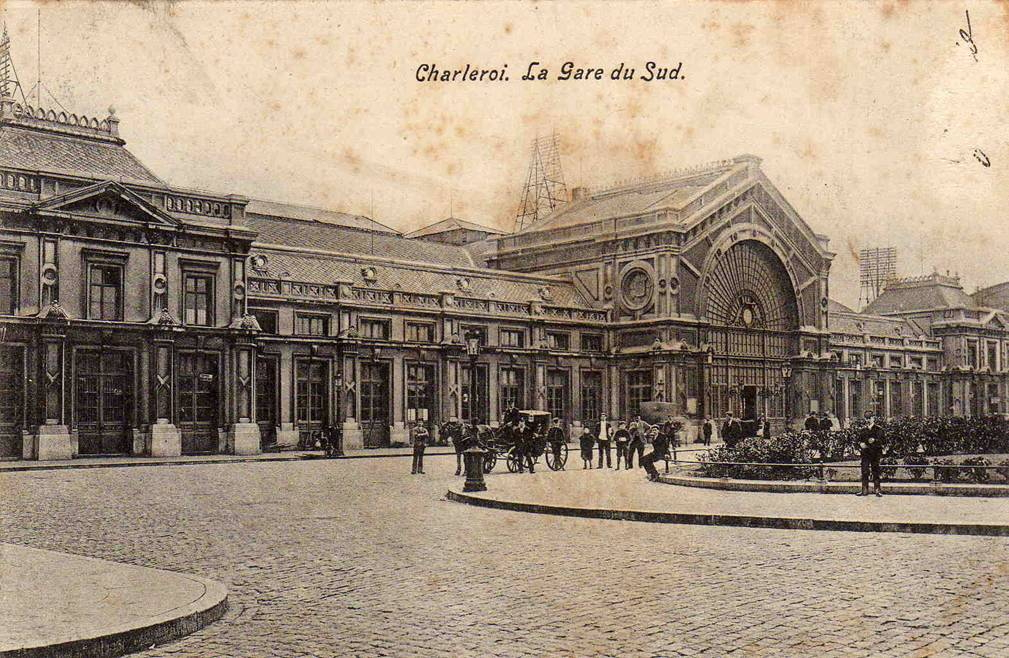
Charleroi-South railway station in the early 20th century

The first railway connection to Charleroi was inaugurated in 1843, when the Belgian State Railways (Chemins de fer de l'État Belge) opened an indirect line from Brussels to Charleroi (via Braine-le-Comte), continuing to Namur. On 23 October 1843, a train stopped for the first time in Charleroi. At this time, the station was not more than a temporary building along the rails at the north-west of the actual site. In 1848, the Compagnie de l'Entre Sambre et Meuse to Walcourt and Morialmé opened, to support local extractive industries. In 1852, the Compagnie du Nord-Belge opened to connect Charleroi with its northern French network, via Erquelinnes. In 1855, the Compagnie du Grand Central Belge to Ottignies also opened.

The opening of the current more direct line to Brussels, via Nivelles and Luttre, took place in 1874. The current station building was inaugurated in October the same year after nine years of works. The building is in neoclassical style and the use of innovative materials such as iron and glass at the time gave it an avant-garde style. The building is a continuation of the work of A.P.J. Lambeau, principal engineer for the Ministry of Railways, who also designed the stations at Namur (1864), Liège-Guillemins (1870), and Mons (1870). In 1949, the line to Brussels was electrified, making the second railway line in Belgium to be electrified after the Brussels–Antwerp line in 1935.

=== 21st century ===
The station was served by a daily Thalys high-speed rail service to Paris between 1998 and 31 March 2015. In June 2011, after seven years of work, the renovated station was inaugurated. Renovation included the exterior of the 1874 building, the interior (including a new shopping gallery), tunnels, as well as the square in front of the station.

In 2021, work began to improve accessibility to the station. It will include the installation of lifts to access each platform. The station will now be fully accessible to persons with reduced mobility. New ticket offices will be installed, the platform shelters will be modernised and a brand new corridor will be built under the tracks.

== Train services ==
The station is served by the following services:

- Intercity services (IC-05) Antwerp - Mechelen - Brussels - Nivelles - Charleroi (weekdays)
- Intercity services (IC-19) Lille - Tournai - Saint-Ghislain - Mons - Charleroi - Namur
- Intercity services (IC-24) Charleroi - Walcourt - Mariembourg - Couvin
- Intercity services (IC-25) Mons - Charleroi - Namur - Huy - Liege (weekdays)
- Intercity services (IC-25) Mouscron - Tournai - Saint-Ghislain - Mons - Charleroi - Namur - Huy - Liege - Liers (weekends)
- Intercity services (IC-27) Brussels Airport - Brussels-Luxembourg - Nivelles - Charleroi (weekdays)
- Intercity services (IC-31) Antwerp - Mechelen - Brussels - Nivelles - Charleroi (weekends)
- Intercity services (K82) Maubeuge - Charleroi - Namur
- Local services (L-06) Luttre - Manage - La Louvière - Charleroi (weekdays)
- Local services (L-06) Manage - La Louvière - Charleroi (weekends)
- Local services (L-06A) Manage - Luttre - Charleroi (weekends)
- Local services (L-07) Erquelinnes - Lobbes - Charleroi
- Local services (L-14) Ottignies - Fleurus - Charleroi - Tamines - Namur - Jambes

Preceding station	NMBS/SNCB	Following station
Marchienne-au-Pont towards Antwerpen-Centraal	IC 05 weekdays	Terminus
La Louvière-Sud towards Lille-Flandres	IC 19	Tamines towards Namur
Berzée towards Couvin	IC 24 weekdays	Terminus
Jamioulx towards Couvin	IC 24 weekends	Terminus
Marchienne-au-Pont towards Mons	IC 25 weekdays	Châtelet (B) towards Herstal
Marchienne-au-Pont towards Mouscron	IC 25 weekends	Châtelet (B) towards Liers
Marchienne-au-Pont towards Brussels National Airport	IC 27 weekdays	Terminus
Marchienne-au-Pont towards Antwerpen-Centraal	IC 31 weekends	Terminus
Marchienne-au-Pont towards Luttre	L 06 weekdays	Terminus
Marchienne-au-Pont towards Manage	L 06 weekends	Terminus
Marchienne-au-Pont towards Manage	L 06A weekends	Terminus
Marchienne-Zone towards Erquelinnes	L 07	Terminus
Charleroi-West towards Ottignies	L 14	Couillet towards Jambes
Preceding station	TER Hauts-de-France	Following station
Maubeuge Terminus	Krono K82	Namur Terminus

In addition to the above services, additional peak time trains are scheduled on weekdays (mornings and end of afternoons).

== Metro station ==
Gare Centrale

General information
- Transit authority: TEC Charleroi
- Tracks: 2
- Bus routes: 32
- Bus operators: TEC Charleroi

Construction
- Platform levels: 1
- Parking: Yes

History
- Opened: 21 June 1976

Services
Preceding station	Charleroi Metro	Following station
Ouest One-way operation	M1	Tirou towards Monument
Ouest towards Monument	M2	Tirou One-way operation
Ouest towards Faubourg de Bruxelles	M3	Tirou One-way operation
Ouest One-way operation	M4	Tirou towards Soleilmont
Location

Charleroi-South metro station, simply known as South (French: Sud) on network maps, was opened in 1976. Along with Vilette, Sud was the first station to enter service on the Charleroi Metro.

Located at street level, Sud was a terminus station until the opening of the last section of the central loop of the Charleroi Metro, on 27 February 2012. The station features a balloon loop from the times it was a terminus, allowing vehicles entering it from the west to reverse. It is unused since the central loop's completion.

== Bus station ==
Charleroi-South bus station is the main TEC bus transfer point in Charleroi. An express bus line (line A1) serves the Brussels South Charleroi Airport.

== Gallery ==
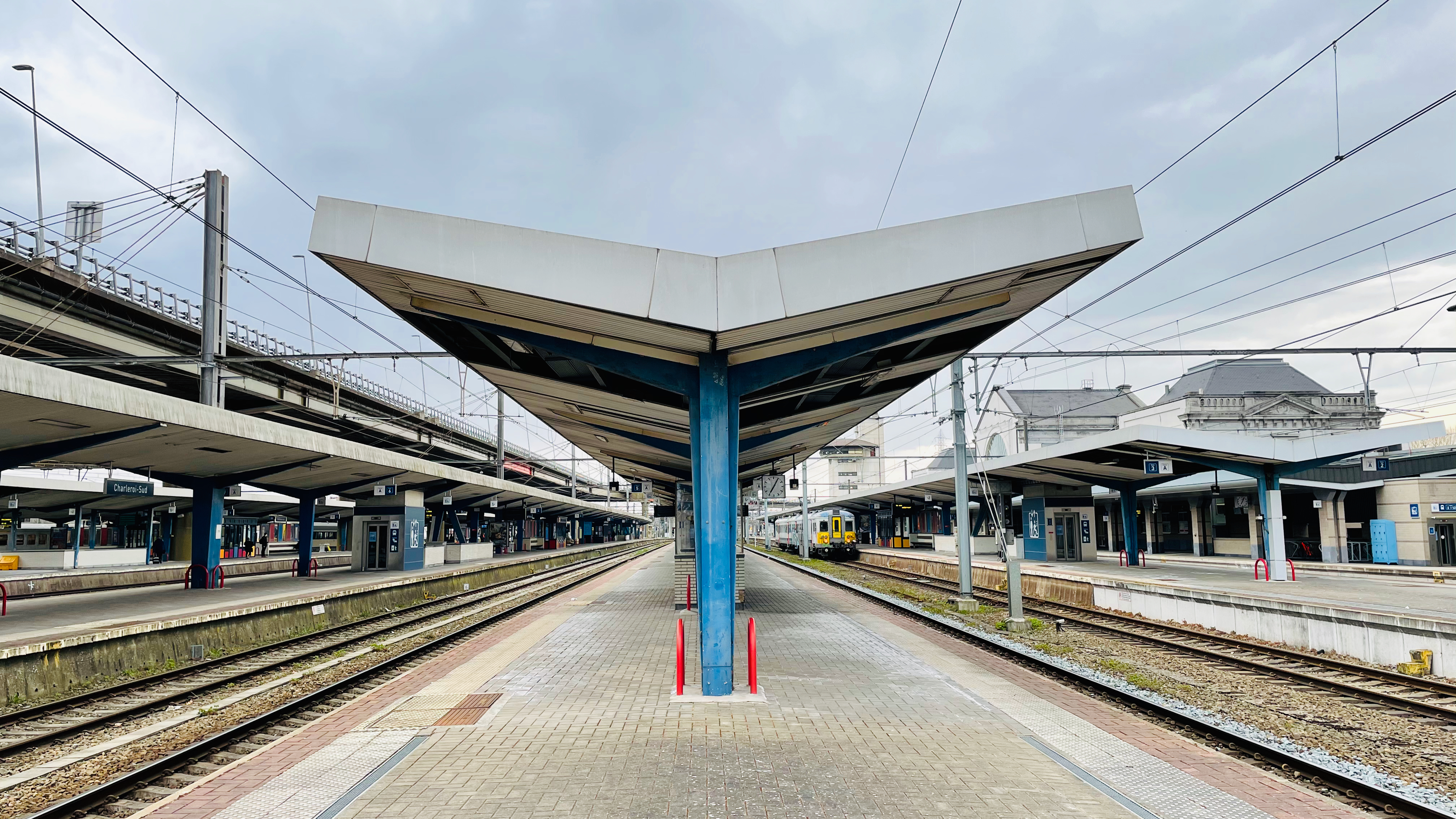
View of the platforms

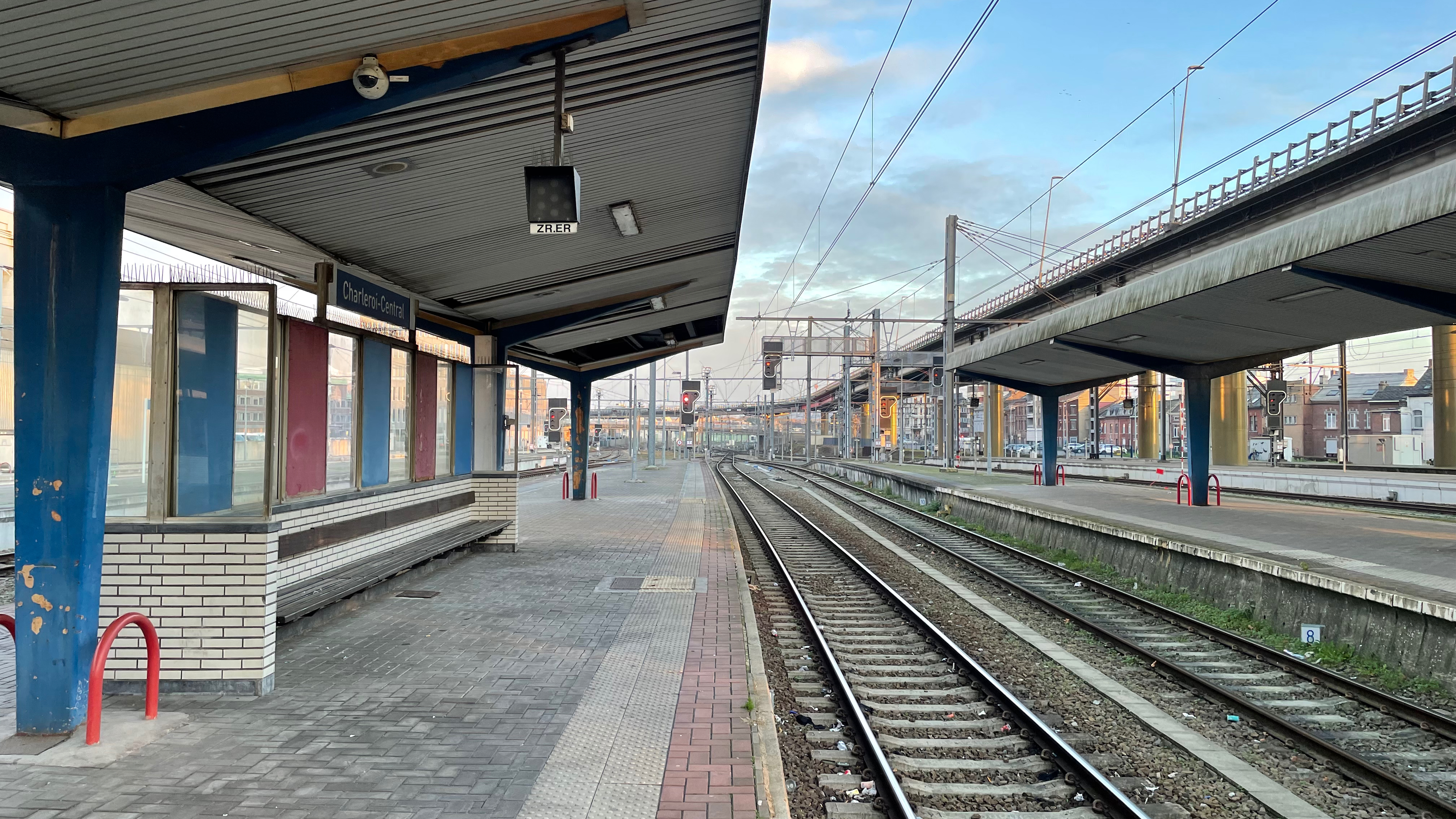
View of the platforms and tracks

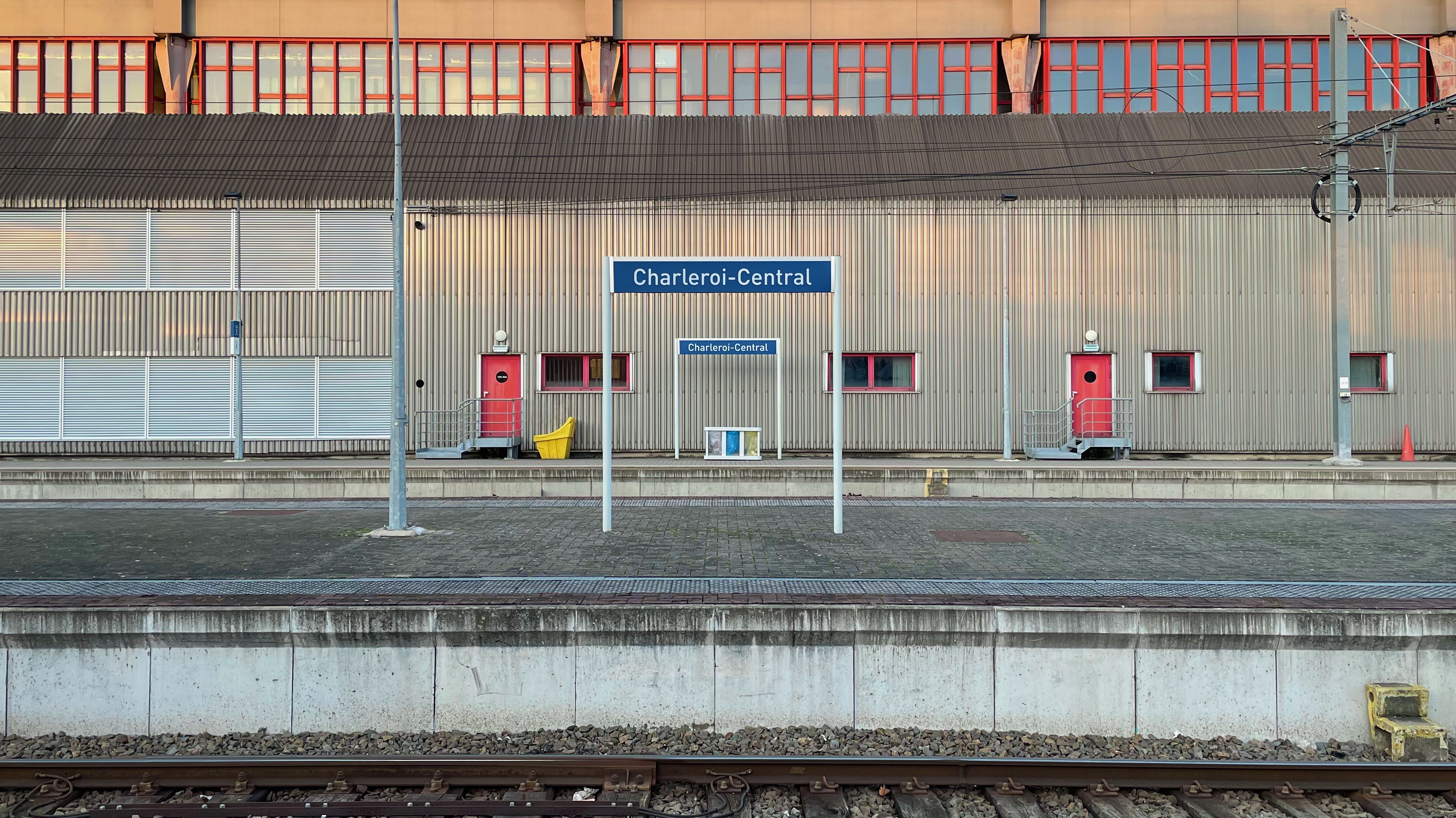
Place name sign on a platform

== See also ==
- List of railway stations in Belgium
- Rail transport in Belgium
