= Opérateur de transport de Wallonie =

Walloon public transport corporation

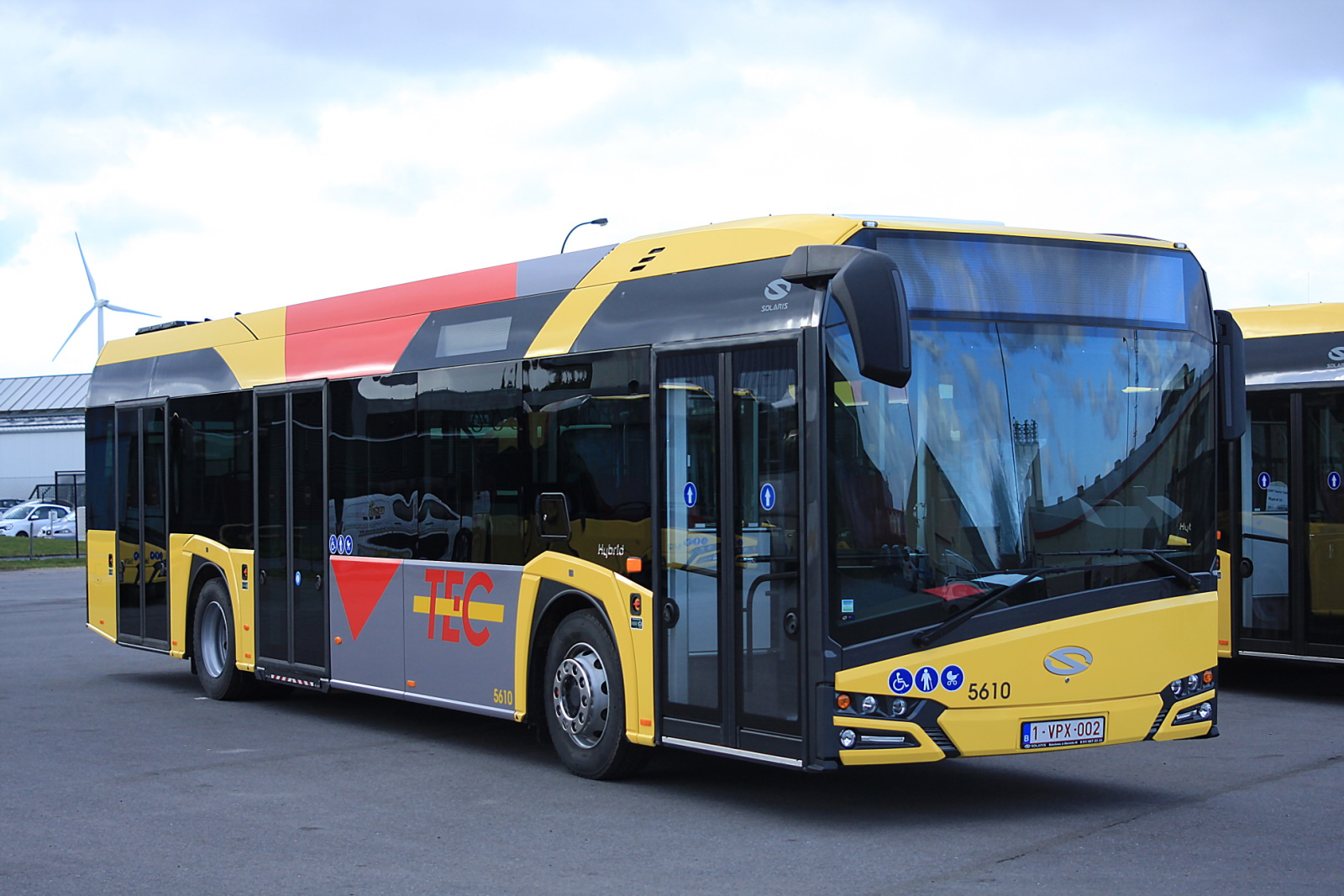
- TEC Liège's Solaris Urbino Mk4 Hybrid
- Parent: Government of Wallonia
- Founded: 1991
- Headquarters: Av. Gouverneur Bovesse, 96; 5100 Jambes; Belgium
- Service area: Wallonia (main)
- Service type: bus service, tram, Metro, demand responsive transport
- Website: (in English) https://www.letec.be/

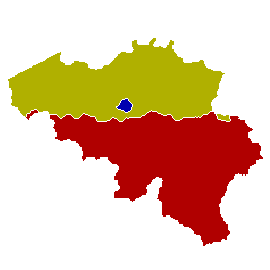
Regions of Belgium Brussels-Capital (blue) Wallonia (red) Flanders (yellow)

Opérateur de transport de Wallonie (French pronunciation: [ɔpeʁatœʁ də tʁɑ̃spɔʁ də walɔni], Transport Operator of Wallonia, OTW), formerly Société régionale wallonne du transport ([sɔsjete ʁeʒjɔnal walɔn dy tʁɑ̃spɔʁ], Walloon Regional Transport Company, SRWT), is responsible for the supervision, strategic planning and marketing of a group of five regional public transport directorates branded as TEC or "Transport En Commun" (French for: Public Transport) in Wallonia, Belgium. It is primarily a bus operator, but also operates the Charleroi light rail system and the light rail line in Liège.

TEC sells the MOBIB smartcard, branded "TEC it easy", and runs a chain of shops called Espace TEC. Most of TEC buses, and trams in Charleroi, are distinctively painted yellow and red.

== History ==
TEC was founded in 1991 through the breakup of the former Belgian NMVB/SNCV into separate companies for Wallonia and Flanders. In 2019, Société régionale wallonne du Transport (SRWT) became Opérateur de transport de Wallonie (OTW).

== TEC directorate ==
- TEC Walloon Brabant
- TEC Charleroi
- TEC Hainaut
- TEC Liège-Verviers
- TEC Namur-Luxembourg

== See also ==
- De Lijn - public transport company in Flanders
- Société des Transports Intercommunaux de Bruxelles STIB-MIVB - public transport company in Brussels
- Vicinal tramway - the former SNCV
- Métro Léger de Charleroi
- Trams in Liège
