= List of Charleroi Metro stations =

The following is the list of the 49 stations (25 premetro stations, and 24 tram stops) of the Charleroi Metro in Belgium, and includes all stations in the Charleroi area network, as well as tram stops that are also served by premetro lines. It also includes 4 unopened stations on the unfinished line to Châtelet that will be renewed and extended.

== Central loop ==
The "central loop" of the Charleroi Metro is grade separated (except in the vicinity of Tirou) and thus is the portion of the network that effectively operates as an almost fully metro-standards rapid transit system. There are 9 stations on the central loop, and these are served by all four Charleroi Metro lines:

Name	Type	Character	Lines	Opened	Municipality	Coords
Sud	tram	Surface	M1 M2 M3 M4	October 1973	Charleroi	50°24′17″N 4°26′19″E
Villette	metro	Viaduct	M1 M2 M3 M4	21 July 1976	Charleroi	50°24′23″N 4°26′6″E
Ouest	metro	Underground	M1 M2 M3 M4	30 June 1980	Charleroi	50°24′38″N 4°26′11″E
Beaux-Arts	metro	Underground	M1 M2 M3 M4	24 or 29 May 1983	Charleroi	50°24′53″N 4°26′35″E
Waterloo	metro	Underground	M1 M2 M3 M4	28 August 1992	Charleroi	50°25′02″N 4°27′02″E
Janson	metro	Underground	M1 M2 M3 M4	30 August 1996	Charleroi	50°24′47″N 4°27′07″E
Parc	metro	Underground	M1 M2 M3 M4	30 August 1996	Charleroi	50°24′34″N 4°26′55″E
Tirou	Tram	Surface	M1 M2 M3 M4	27 February 2012	Charleroi	50°24′22″N 4°26′44″E
Sambre	Tram	Surface	M1 M2 M3 M4	3 January 2023	Charleroi	50°24′19″N 4°26′31″E

== Anderlues line: Lines M1 & M2 ==
The following 10 stations (including one station that also serves the M3 line) and 6 tram stops are found on the M1 and M2 lines of the Charleroi Metro:

Name	Type	Character	Lines	Opened	Municipality	Coords
Piges	metro	Viaduct	M1 M2 M3	30 June 1980	Dampremy (Charleroi)	50°24′55″N 4°26′14″E
Dampremy	metro	Underground	M1 M2	24 or 29 May 1983	Dampremy (Charleroi)	50°25′00″N 4°25′43″E
Providence	metro	Viaduct	M1 M2	22 or 23 August 1992	Marchienne-au-Pont (Charleroi)	50°24′46″N 4°24′27″E
De Cartier	metro	Underground	M1 M2	22 or 23 August 1992	Marchienne-au-Pont (Charleroi)	50°24′25″N 4°23′43″E
Moulin	metro	Viaduct	M1 M2	22 or 23 August 1992	Monceau-sur-Sambre (Charleroi)	50°24′31″N 4°23′14″E
Morgnies	metro	Surface	M1 M2	21 June 1982	Monceau-sur-Sambre (Charleroi)	50°24′15″N 4°21′54″E
Leernes	metro	Surface	M1 M2	21 June 1982	Leernes (Fontaine-l'Évêque)	50°24′06″N 4°20′50″E
Paradis	metro	Viaduct	M1 M2	21 June 1982	Fontaine-l'Évêque	50°24′19″N 4°20′17″E
Fontaine	metro	Underground	M1 M2	30 August 1986	Fontaine-l'Évêque	50°24′24″N 4°19′37″E
Pétria	metro	Surface	M1 M2	30 August 1986	Fontaine-l'Évêque	50°24′22″N 4°18′42″E
Coron du Berger	Tram	Surface	M1 M2		Fontaine-l'Évêque	50°24′23″N 4°18′07″E
Surchiste	Tram	Surface	M1 M2		Fontaine-l'Évêque	50°24′23″N 4°17′37″E
Route de Thuin	Tram	Surface	M1 M2		Anderlues	50°24′12″N 4°17′14″E
Jonction	Tram	Surface	M1 M2		Anderlues	50°24′00″N 4°16′59″E
Route de la Station	Tram	Surface	M1 M2		Anderlues	50°24′12″N 4°16′37″E
Monument	Tram	Surface	M1 M2		Anderlues	50°24′21″N 4°16′18″E

== Gosselies line: Line M3 ==
The following 18 tram stops and the Piges premetro station which is also served by the M1 and M2 lines are found on just the M3 line:

Name	Type	Character	Lines	Opened	Municipality	Coords
Piges	metro	Viaduct	M1 M2 M3	30 June 1980	Dampremy (Charleroi)	50°24′55″N 4°26′14″E
Sacré Madame	Tram	Surface	M3	22 June 2013	Dampremy (Charleroi)	50°25′05″N 4°26′19″E
La Planche	Tram	Surface	M3	22 June 2013	Dampremy (Charleroi)	50°25′20″N 4°26′25″E
Deschassis	Tram	Surface	M3	22 June 2013	Lodelinsart (Charleroi)	50°25′38″N 4°26′26″E
Marie Curie	Tram	Surface	M3	22 June 2013	Lodelinsart (Charleroi)	50°25′51″N 4°26′27″E
Saint Antoine	Tram	Surface	M3	22 June 2013	Jumet (Charleroi)	50°26′08″N 4°26′26″E
Puissant	Tram	Surface	M3	22 June 2013	Jumet (Charleroi)	50°26′24″N 4°26′18″E
Chaussée de Gilly	Tram	Surface	M3	22 June 2013	Jumet (Charleroi)	50°26′36″N 4°26′13″E
Rue Berteau	Tram	Surface	M3	22 June 2013	Jumet (Charleroi)	50°26′48″N 4°26′08″E
Madeleine	Tram	Surface	M3	22 June 2013	Jumet (Charleroi)	50°27′08″N 4°25′59″E
Carrosse	Tram	Surface	M3	22 June 2013	Gosselies (Charleroi)	50°27′33″N 4°25′49″E
Léopold ↓	Tram	Surface	M3	22 June 2013	Gosselies (Charleroi)	50°27′55″N 4°25′54″E
Calvaire ↓	Tram	Surface	M3	22 June 2013	Gosselies (Charleroi)	50°28′07″N 4°25′56″E
Bruyerre ↓	Tram	Surface	M3	22 June 2013	Gosselies (Charleroi)	50°28′24″N 4°26′08″E
Chaussée de Fleurus ↑	Tram	Surface	M3	22 June 2013	Gosselies (Charleroi)	50°27′50″N 4°26′12″E
City Nord ↑	Tram	Surface	M3	22 June 2013	Gosselies (Charleroi)	50°28′05″N 4°26′18″E
Emailleries ↑	Tram	Surface	M3	22 June 2013	Gosselies (Charleroi)	50°28′16″N 4°26′19″E
Rue du Chemin de Fer ↑	Tram	Surface	M3	22 June 2013	Gosselies (Charleroi)	50°28′22″N 4°26′20″E
Faubourg de Bruxelles	Tram	Surface	M3	22 June 2013	Gosselies (Charleroi)	50°28′37″N 4°26′24″E

== Gilly line: Line M4 ==
The following 6 stations are found on the M4 line of the Charleroi Metro:

Name	Type	Character	Lines	Opened	Municipality	Coords
Samaritaine	metro	Underground	M4	28 August 1992	Charleroi	50°25′12″N 4°27′41″E
Gazomètre	metro	Underground	M4	28 August 1992	Gilly (Charleroi)	50°25′19″N 4°28′26″E
Gilly	metro	Underground	M4	28 August 1992	Gilly (Charleroi)	50°25′25″N 4°28′45″E
Marabout	metro	Underground	M4	27 February 2012	Gilly (Charleroi)	50°25′37″N 4°29′14″E
Sart-Culpart	metro	Surface	M4	27 February 2012	Gilly (Charleroi)	50°25′45″N 4°29′43″E
Soleilmont	metro	Surface	M4	27 February 2012	Gilly (Charleroi)	50°25′49″N 4°30′10″E

== Châtelet line: Line M5: Not completed ==
The following 4 stations are found on the unfinished line to Châtelet. These out-of-service stations were completed in late 1980s but never opened for service. There were 4 more stations planned (construction of some of them started but did not finish) but the line has been abandoned, and the surface building of the Centennaire station was demolished in 2010s (while the underground structure still remains intact). In early 2021 a decision was made to finish and open the line (see Métro Léger de Charleroi § Châtelet line: Line M5 branch for more details).

Name	Type	Character	Lines	Opened	Municipality	Coords
Neuville	metro	Viaduct	M5	—	Montignies-sur-Sambre (Charleroi)	50°24′53″N 4°27′32″E
Chet	metro	Viaduct	M5	—	Montignies-sur-Sambre (Charleroi)	50°24′37″N 4°27′52″E
Pensée	metro	Surface	M5	—	Montignies-sur-Sambre (Charleroi)	50°24′23″N 4°28′07″E
Centenaire	metro	Underground	M5	—	Montignies-sur-Sambre (Charleroi)	50°24′11″N 4°28′46″E
Champeau	metro	Surface (No Track)	M5	—	Montignies-sur-Sambre (Charleroi)	50°24'11.4"N 4°29'16.3"E
Léopold	metro	Surface (No Track)	M5	—	Montignies-sur-Sambre (Charleroi)	50°24'26.7"N 4°29'34.1"E

== See also ==
- List of Charleroi Metro former lines
