= List of Charleroi Metro former lines =

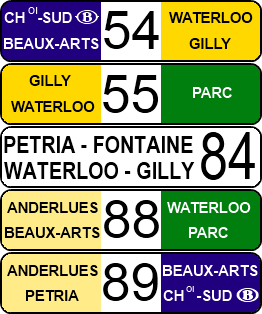
Destination display on Charleroi trams prior to 2012.

The following is a list of former lines of the Charleroi Metro which are now defunct. These lines operated on the Charleroi Metro (then known as the Charleroi Premetro) starting from the early 1990s (though a version of Line 89 had existed since 1976) until the system's reorganization into the Charleroi Metro in 2012.

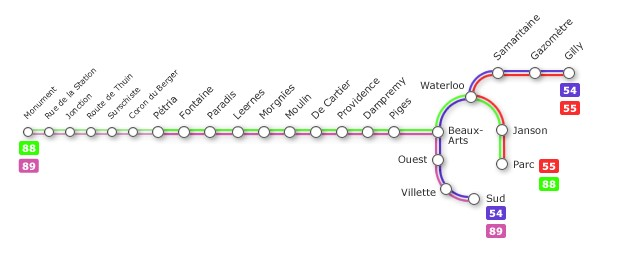
Charleroi Premetro system map previous to 27 February 2012.

Trams on former Lines 54/55 ran from 05:00 until 20:00, and had train frequencies of:

- Every 10 minutes (15 minutes between 18:00 and 20:00) on weekdays.
- Every 15 minutes (20 minutes between 18:00 and 20:00) on Saturdays, and on weekdays during school holidays.
- Every 20 minutes (30 minutes between 18:00 and 20:00) on Sundays and holidays.

Trams on former Lines 88/89 (but not Line 84) ran from 05:30 until 19:00, and had train frequencies of:

- Every 30 minutes on weekdays.
- Every 1 hour on weekends.

These lines operated before the full opening of the 'central loop' of the Charleroi Metro in central Charleroi in 2012, which led to the inauguration of the currently operating Charleroi Metro lines M1, M2, and M4 (and a year later, in 2013, line M3).

== Line 54 ==
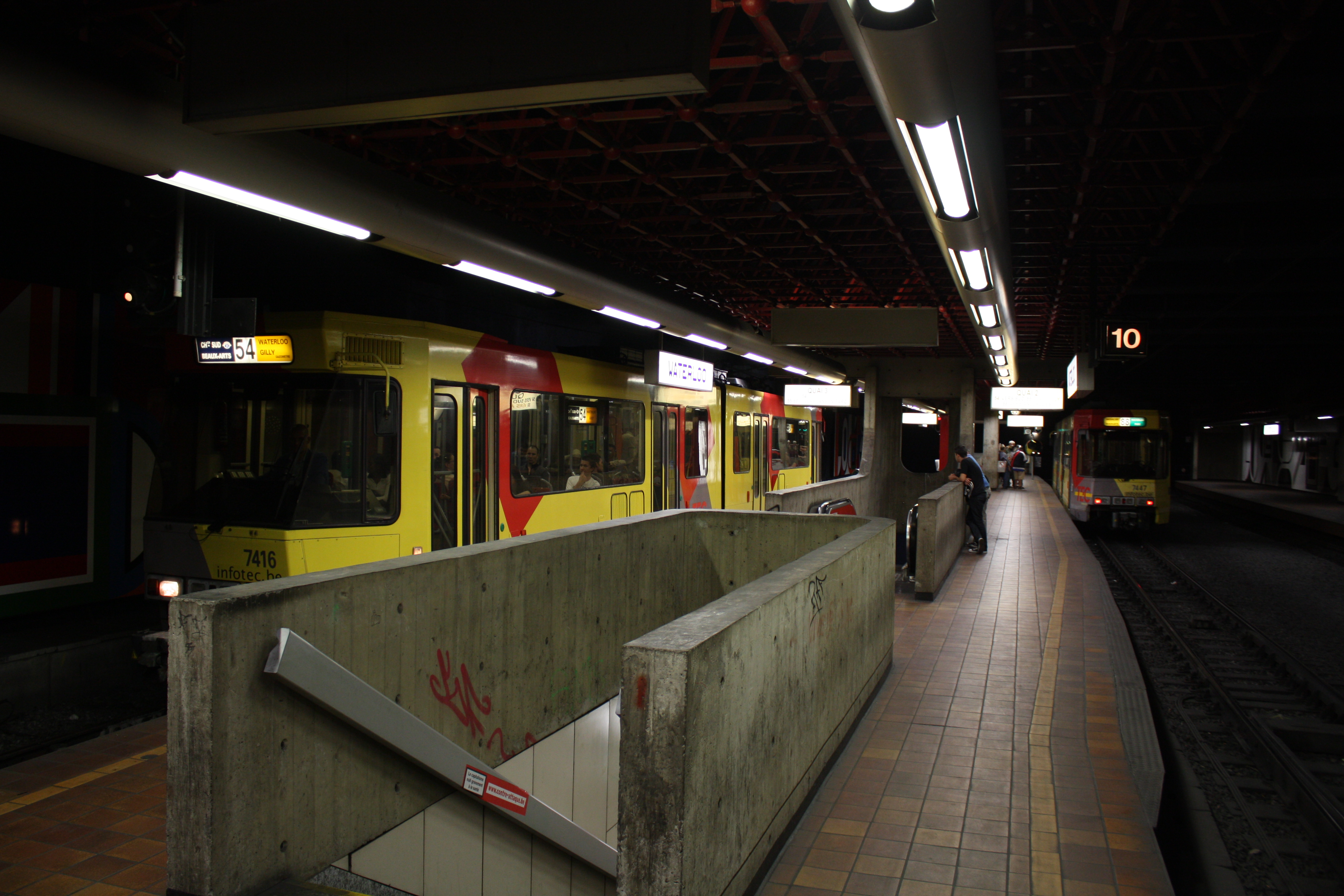
A Line 54 tram in Waterloo station (2009).

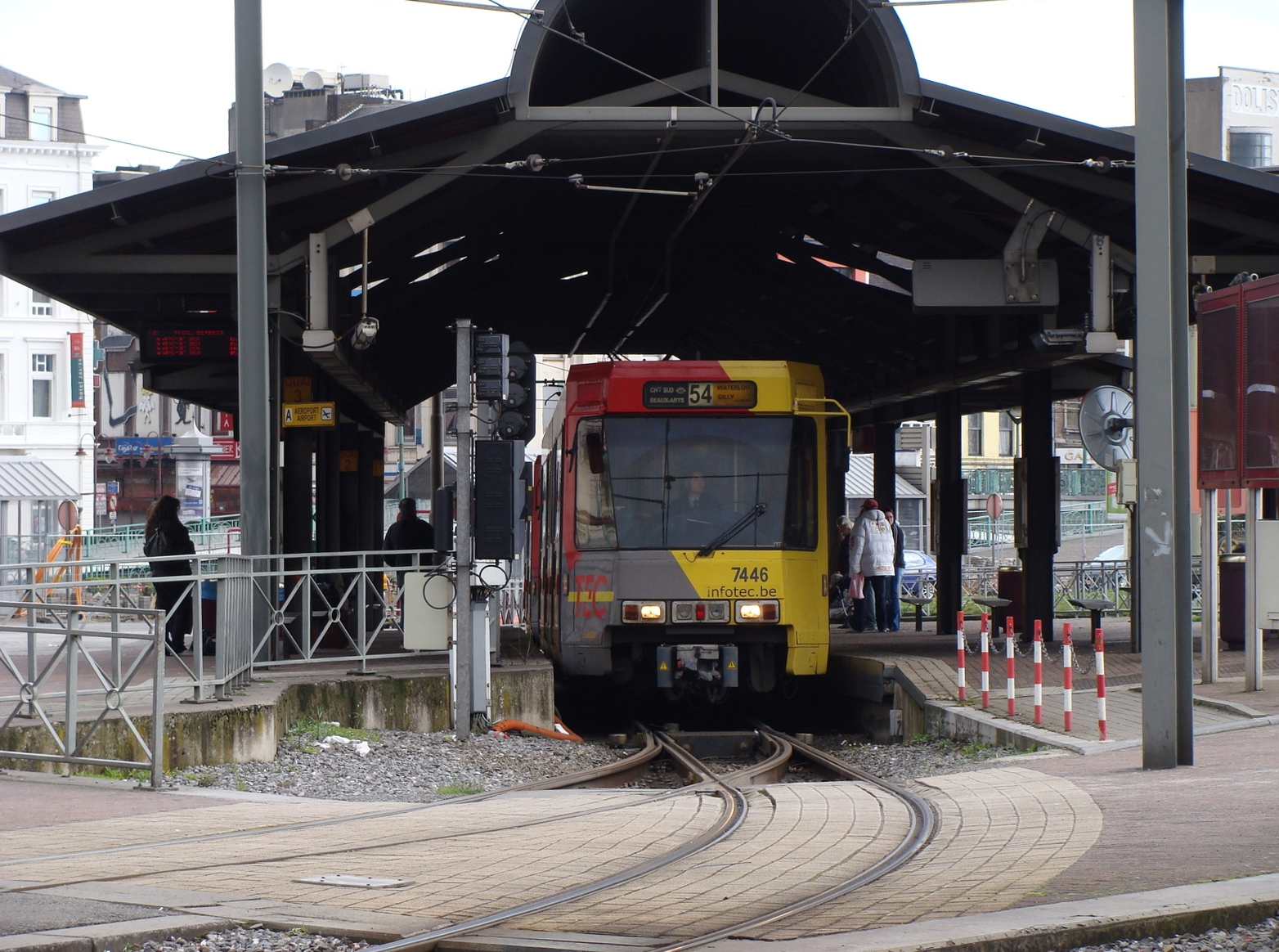
A Line 54 tram ready to leave Sud station (2010).

Line 54 was a line on the Charleroi Premetro in Belgium operated by TEC Charleroi, running from Charleroi-South railway station (aka. Sud), in downtown Charleroi, to Gilly (part of the municipality of Charleroi), via the western part of the downtown loop.

Line 54 was inaugurated on 28 August 1992 and was the first to use the Gilly branch of the Charleroi Premetro network when it opened in 1992. It remained the sole line to operate on that branch until the opening of Line 55 in 1996.

Line 54 had a length of 5.38 kilometres (3.34 mi), all on premetro infrastructure, and included 8 stations. Trams drove on the right between Sud and Waterloo, then on the left between Samaritaine and Gilly. Some Line 54 services were operated by 2 trams coupled together.

=== List of stations on Line 54 ===
- Sud^{†}
- Villette^{†}
- Ouest^{†}
- Beaux-Arts^{†}
- Waterloo^{†}
- Samaritaine
- Gazomètre
- Gilly

^{^† On the then-incomplete Charleroi metro loop.}

== Line 55 ==
Line 55 was a line on the Charleroi Premetro in Belgium operated by TEC Charleroi, running from Parc station, in downtown Charleroi, to Gilly (part of the municipality of Charleroi), via the eastern part of the downtown loop.

Line 55 was inaugurated on 30 August 1996, together with the Waterloo-Parc section of the downtown loop. It had a length of 3.45 kilometres (2.14 mi), all on premetro infrastructure, and included 6 stations.

Trams drove on the right between Parc and Waterloo, then on the left between Samaritaine and Gilly.

=== List of stations on Line 55 ===
- Parc^{†}
- Janson^{†}
- Waterloo^{†}
- Samaritaine
- Gazomètre
- Gilly

^{^† On the then-incomplete Charleroi metro loop.}

== Line 84 ==
Line 84 was a special line on the Charleroi Premetro in Belgium operated by TEC Charleroi, running from Anderlues (west of Charleroi) to Gilly (northeast), via the northwestern part of the downtown loop.

Line 84 was a hybrid between Lines 88/89 and Line 54. Its itinerary used only premetro infrastructure to allow service by two trams coupled together, which was not feasible on the tram section of Lines 88/89 in Anderlues. For this reason, Line 84 was limited to terminating at Pétria station in Anderlues.

Line 84 was a special morning rush hour line, operating only one service a day (departing Pétria at 07:29, only on school days), aimed at reducing morning congestion on Lines 88/89 and provide a direct line between western Charleroi and the north/northeastern part of downtown Charleroi where some important schools are located. It was not mentioned on network maps and stations signs, but was shown on the timetable of Lines 88 and 89.

=== List of stations on Line 84 ===
- Pétria
- Fontaine
- Paradis
- Leernes
- Morgnies
- Moulin
- De Cartier
- Providence
- Dampremy
- Piges
- Beaux-Arts^{†}
- Waterloo^{†}
- Samaritaine
- Gazomètre
- Gilly

^{^† On the then-incomplete Charleroi metro loop.}

== Line 88 ==
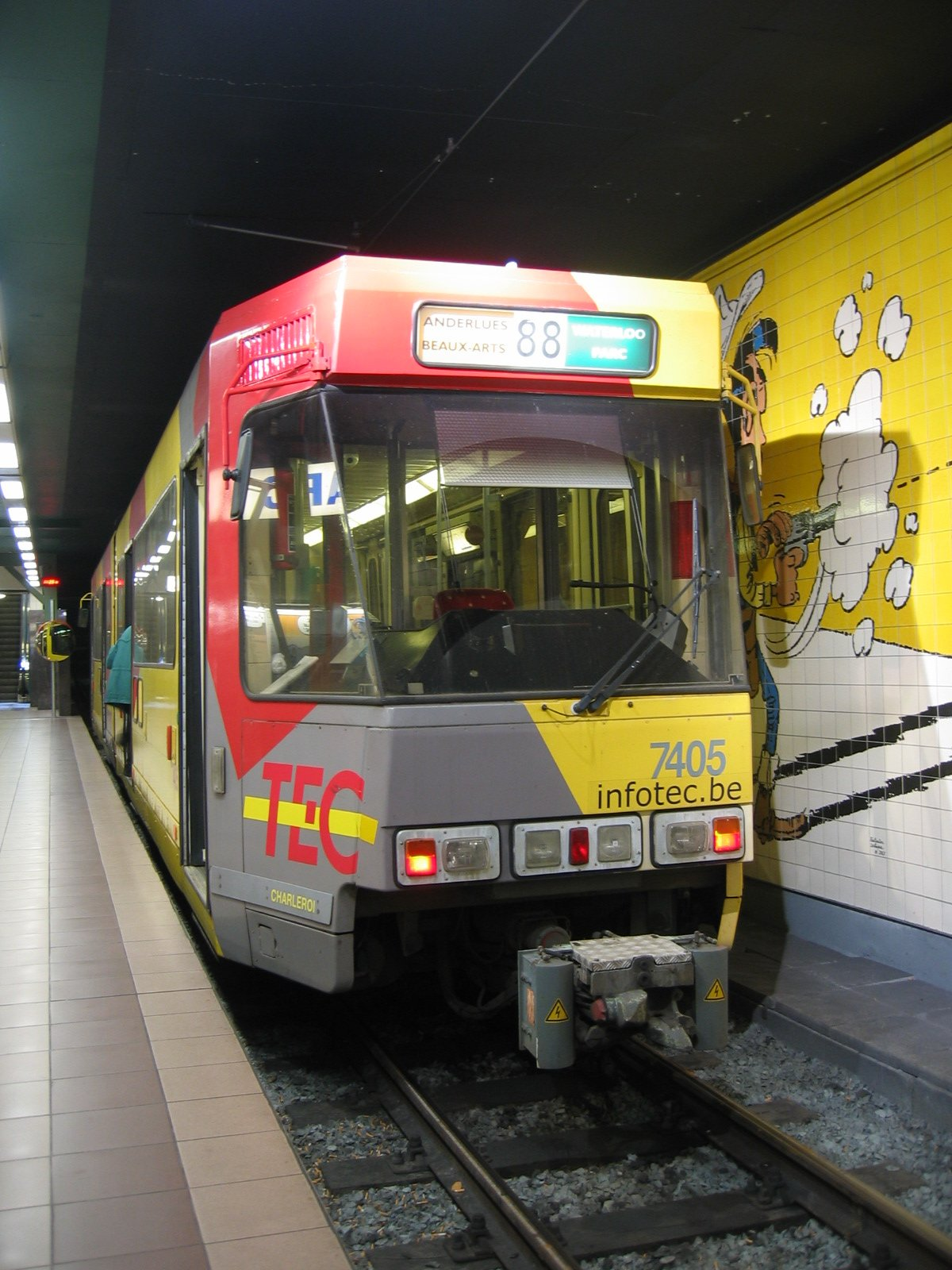
A Line 88 tram at Parc station (2005).

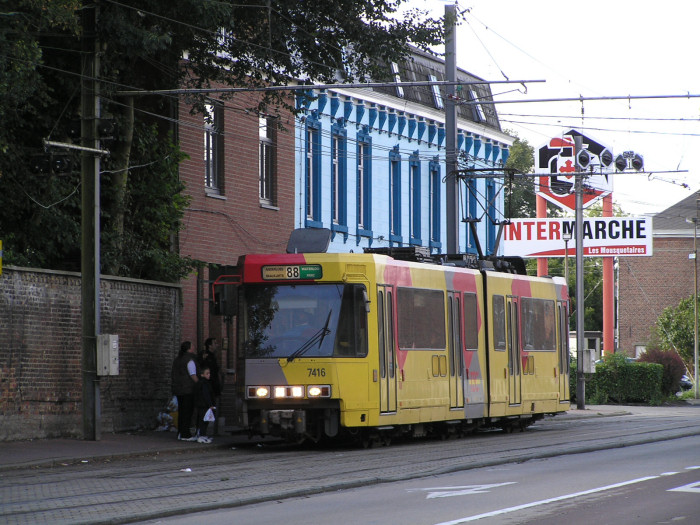
A Line 88 tram in Anderlues at the Monument terminus (2005).

Line 88 was a line on the Charleroi Premetro in Belgium operated by TEC Charleroi, running from Parc station, in downtown Charleroi, to Anderlues (west of Charleroi), via the northern part of the downtown loop.

Line 88 was inaugurated on 30 August 1996, together with the Waterloo-Parc section of the downtown loop. It was created to duplicate the existing Line 89 between Anderlues and Beaux-Arts, but taking the downtown loop to the North at Beaux-Arts (as opposed to traveling to the South for Line 89).

Line 88 had a length of 16.35 kilometres (10.16 mi), of which 3.4 kilometres (2.1 mi) were a standard tramline with in-street running (at the Anderlues end), with the remainder of the line running on premetro infrastructure. It had 14 premetro stations and 6 tram stops, and was the longest line of the Charleroi Premetro network along with Line 89.

Trams drove on the right on the entire line, but on the tram part of the line in Anderlues trams ran on the left, right, or in the middle of the street. A couple of sections of the tram part of the line in Anderlues were single track.

=== List of stations of Line 88 ===
==== Premetro stations ====
The following stations were found on the premetro portion of the system in the vicinity of Charleroi:

- Parc^{†}
- Janson^{†}
- Waterloo^{†}
- Beaux-Arts^{†}
- Piges
- Dampremy
- Providence
- De Cartier
- Moulin
- Morgnies
- Leernes
- Paradis
- Fontaine
- Pétria

^{^† On the then-incomplete Charleroi metro loop.}

==== Tram stops ====
The following tram stops were found in Anderlues on the western portion of the line:

- Coron du Berger
- Surchiste
- Route de Thuin
- Jonction
- Route de la station
- Monument

== Line 89 ==
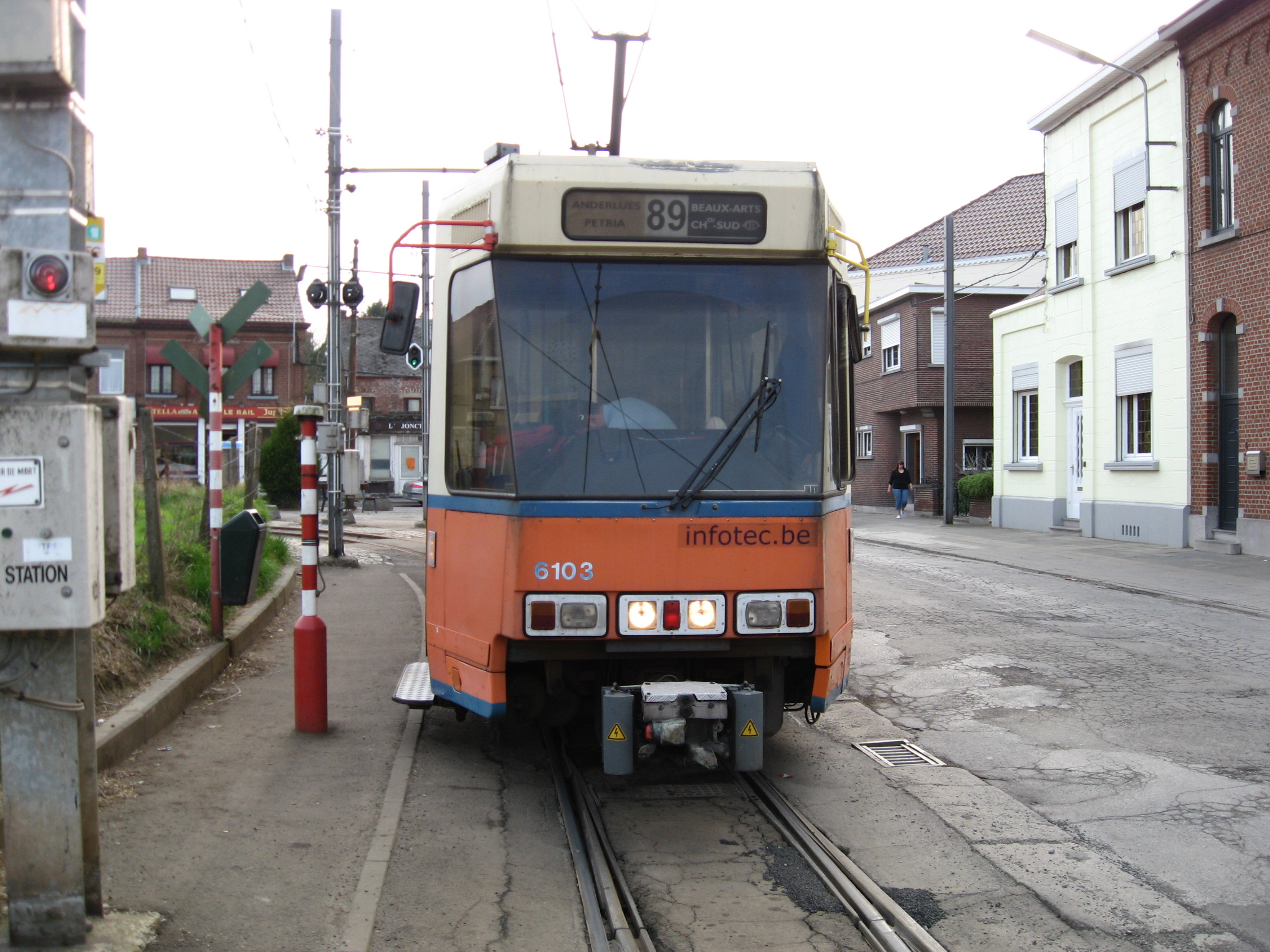
A line 89 tram in Anderlues (2009).

Line 89 was a line on the Charleroi Premetro in Belgium operated by TEC Charleroi, running from Charleroi-South railway station (aka. Sud), in downtown Charleroi, to Anderlues (west of Charleroi), via the southwestern part of the downtown loop.

Line 89 existed before the first stations of the Charleroi Premetro were inaugurated in 1976, as an SNCV tramline linking Charleroi and Anderlues. It became a premetro line in phases, starting in 1976, as more premetro stations were added to the network. The Line 89 version of this tramline started its service in 1992.

Line 89 followed the same itinerary as Line 88 between Anderlues and Beaux-Arts, but took the (then-partial) downtown loop to the South at Beaux-Arts (as opposed to traveling to the North for Line 88).

Line 89 had a length of 16.28 kilometres (10.12 mi), of which 3.4 kilometres (2.1 mi) were a standard tramline with in-street running (at the Anderlues end), with the remainder of the line running on premetro infrastructure. It had 14 premetro stations and 6 tram stops, and was the longest line of the Charleroi Premetro network along with Line 88.

Trams drove on the right on the entire line, but on the tram part of the line in Anderlues trams ran on the left, right, or in the middle of the street. A couple of sections of the tram part of the line in Anderlues were single track.

=== Replacement night bus service ===
Between 20:00 and 22:00, a replacement night bus (also numbered "89") operated with low frequency (only 3 departures in each direction on weekdays, 2 on weekends), following an itinerary similar but not identical to this tramline. Stations Piges, De Cartier and Leernes were not served by the night bus service.

=== List of stations on Line 89 ===
==== Premetro stations ====
The following stations were found on the premetro portion of the system in the vicinity of Charleroi:

- Sud^{†}
- Villette^{†}
- Ouest^{†}
- Beaux-Arts^{†}
- Piges
- Dampremy
- Providence
- De Cartier
- Moulin
- Morgnies
- Leernes
- Paradis
- Fontaine
- Pétria

^{^† On the then-incomplete Charleroi metro loop.}

==== Tram stops ====
The following tram stops were found in Anderlues on the western portion of the line:

- Coron du Berger
- Surchiste
- Route de Thuin
- Jonction
- Route de la station
- Monument

== Line 90 ==
Line 90 was a former tram (and premetro) line, operating with the same itinerary as Line 89, but continuing past Anderlues toward La Louvière, via Binche. Historically, Line 90 had previously been an SNCV tramline between Charleroi and Mons. The modern Line 90, which also used the Charleroi Premetro infrastructure, was a hybrid between this historical line (between Charleroi and Binche) and the SNCV Line 36 (between Binche and La Louvière).

Line 90 was closed on 28 August 1993, and the tramline between Anderlues, Binche and La Louvière was left abandoned.

== See also ==
- List of Charleroi Metro stations
- Premetro
