= Charleroi Metro line 1 =

Transit line in Charleroi, Belgium

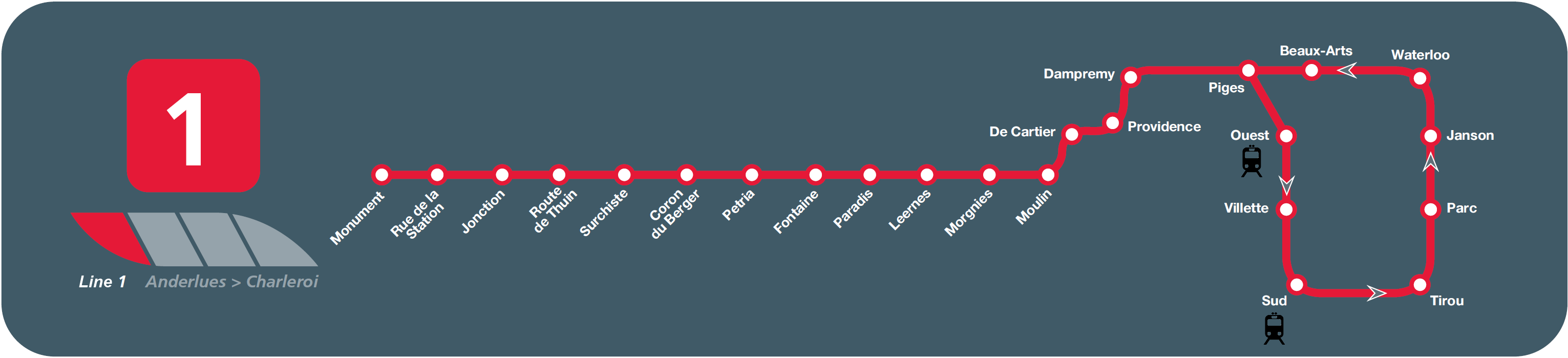
Line M1 map

Line M1 is a line of the Charleroi Metro in Belgium operated by TEC Charleroi, running from the Monument tram stop in Anderlues to the metro loop around central Charleroi, before heading back to Anderlues. Line M1 was created on 27 February 2012 (13 years ago) to replace former lines 88 and 89 after completion of the loop around central Charleroi. Introduction of new line numbers (M1, M2, M3 and M4) in February 2012 coincided with the formal association of colors to line numbers. The official color for line M1 is red.

Line M1 is identical to Line M2 except that it runs along the downtown loop in a counter-clockwise direction.

== Operations ==
Line M1 has a length of 32.12 kilometres (19.96 mi) (including the return portion to Anderlues), of which 6.98 kilometres (4.34 mi) are on a standard tram line on the street (in Anderlues) and the remainder on premetro infrastructure. It has 28 premetro stations (18 distinct) and 12 tram stops (6 distinct). Lines M1 and M2 are the longest lines of the Charleroi Metro network.

Trams drive on the right on the entire line, but the regular tram section of the line in Anderlues (outside of premetro infrastructure) runs on the left, right, or in the middle of the street. A couple of portions of that section in Anderlues are single track.

Officially, the Monument tram stop in Anderlues constitutes the terminus of the line in both directions, however, station and train signage in the eastern direction (towards Charleroi) mentions Charleroi-Sud as a pseudo-terminus for clarity. Signage in the western direction simply mentions Anderlues instead of Monument since Monument is just a small tram stop in the municipality of Anderlues.

The journey duration from Monument to Sud is 32 minutes, which is identical to the duration from Sud to Monument although the itinerary is different depending on the direction.

Period	First departure from Anderlues	First departure from Sud	Last departure from Sud	Last arrival in Anderlues	Interval between trains
Monday to Friday from January to June and from September to December	04:47	05:17	20:10	20:46	30 minutes
Monday to Friday in July and August	04:47	05:17	20:10	20:46	60 minutes 30 minutes during morning/afternoon peak times
Saturday	04:47	05:17	19:47	20:23	60 minutes
Sunday and public holidays	06:44	07:17	19:47	20:23	60 minutes

=== Replacement night bus service ===
A replacement bus service, similarly numbered M1ab on timetables (with "ab" standing for "autobus"), which also functions as the night bus line covering the M2 line route as well, operates with roughly the same itinerary, from 20:00 to 22:00 (3 departures in each direction on weekdays, 2 on week-ends, school and public holidays).

== List of stations ==
=== Tram stops ===
The following tram stops are found in Anderlues on the western portion of the line:

- Monument
- Route de la station
- Jonction
- Route de Thuin
- Surchiste
- Coron du Berger

=== Premetro stations ===
The following stations are found on the premetro portion of the system in the vicinity of Charleroi:

- Pétria
- Fontaine
- Paradis
- Leernes
- Morgnies
- Moulin
- De Cartier
- Providence
- Dampremy

The following stations are found on the full metro portion of the system in central Charleroi:

- Piges
- Ouest
- Villette
- Sud
- Sambre
- Tirou
- Parc
- Janson
- Waterloo
- Beaux-Arts
