= Gazomètre metro station =

Metro station in Charleroi, Belgium

Gazomètre

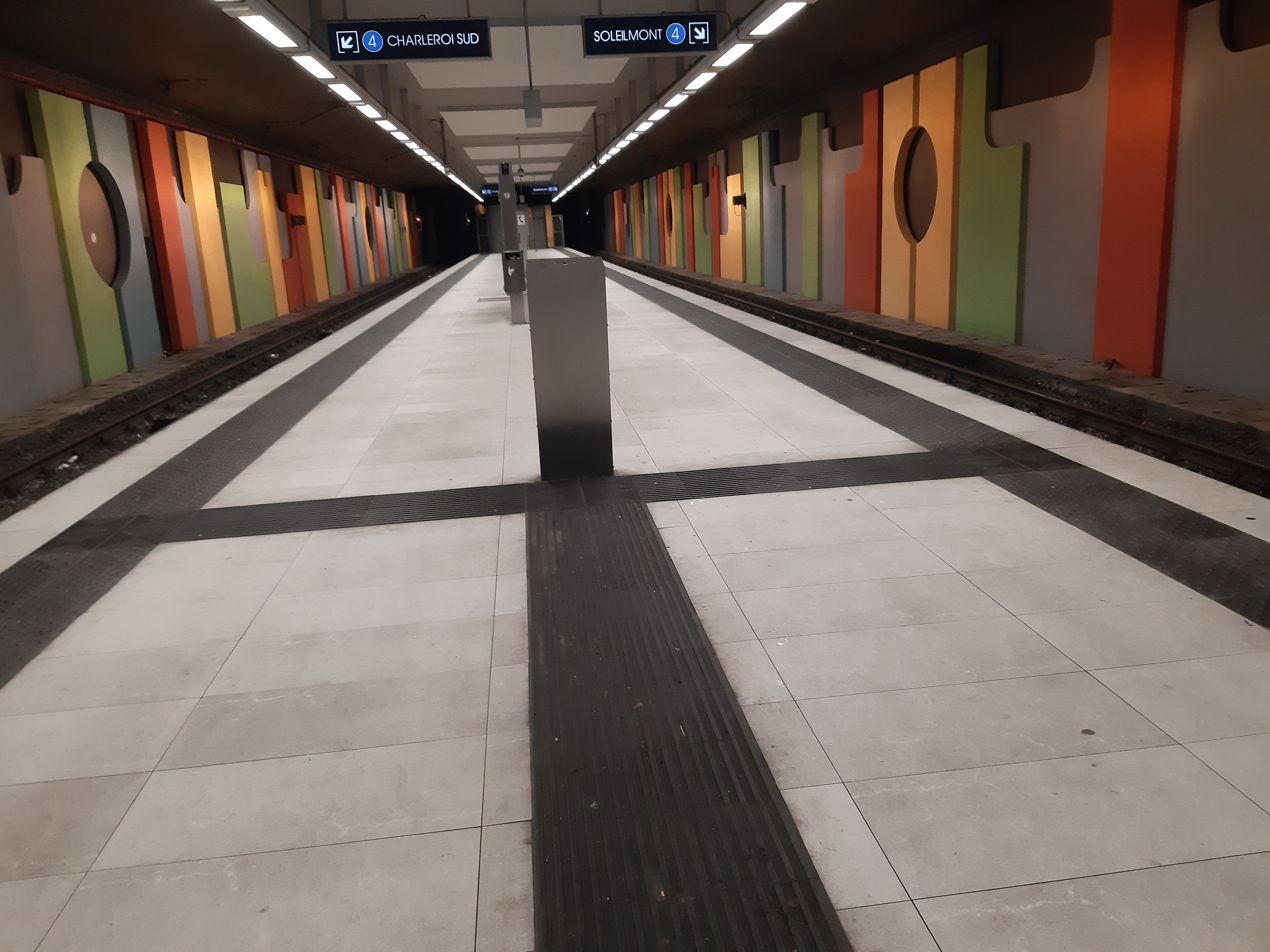

General information
- Coordinates: 50°25′19″N 4°28′26″E
- Transit authority: TEC Charleroi
- Platforms: Island platform
- Tracks: 2

History
- Opened: 28 August 1992

Services
Preceding station	Charleroi Metro	Following station
Samaritaine towards Sud	M4	Gilly towards Soleilmont
Location

Gazomètre (French pronunciation: [ɡazɔmɛtʁ]) is a Charleroi Metro station, located in Gilly (part of the Charleroi municipality), in fare zone 2. Gazomètre is an underground station featuring a central platform, with street access at the eastern end only.

While trams drive on the right on most of the Charleroi Pre-metro network, they drive on the left on the Gilly line, of which Gazomètre is part.

== Nearby points of interest ==
- ZAMI business park.

== Transfers ==
TEC Charleroi bus lines 11, 12/, 14, 27, 28, 155, 156, 710, GHDC, M4ab.
