= Charleroi Metro line 2 =

Metro's line of the city Charleroi

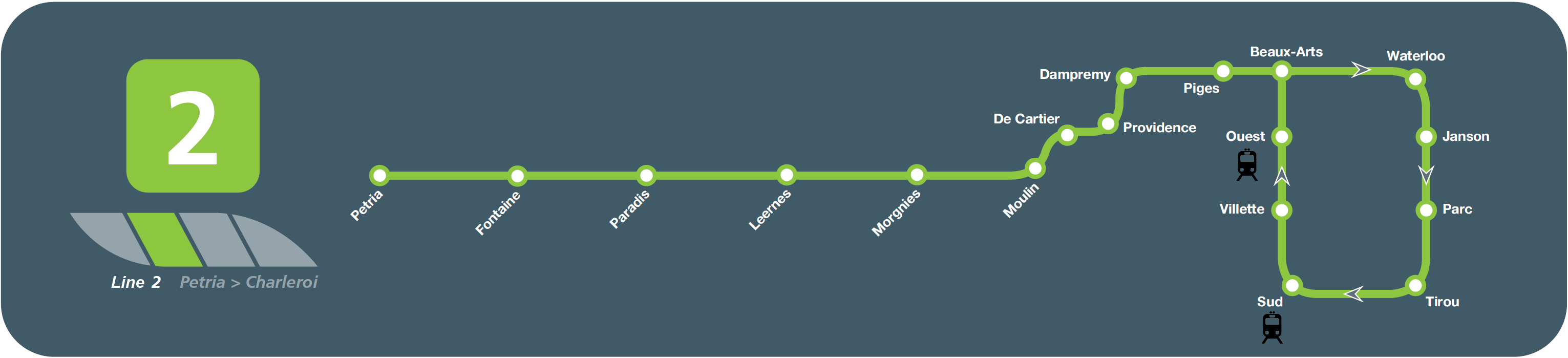
Line M2 map

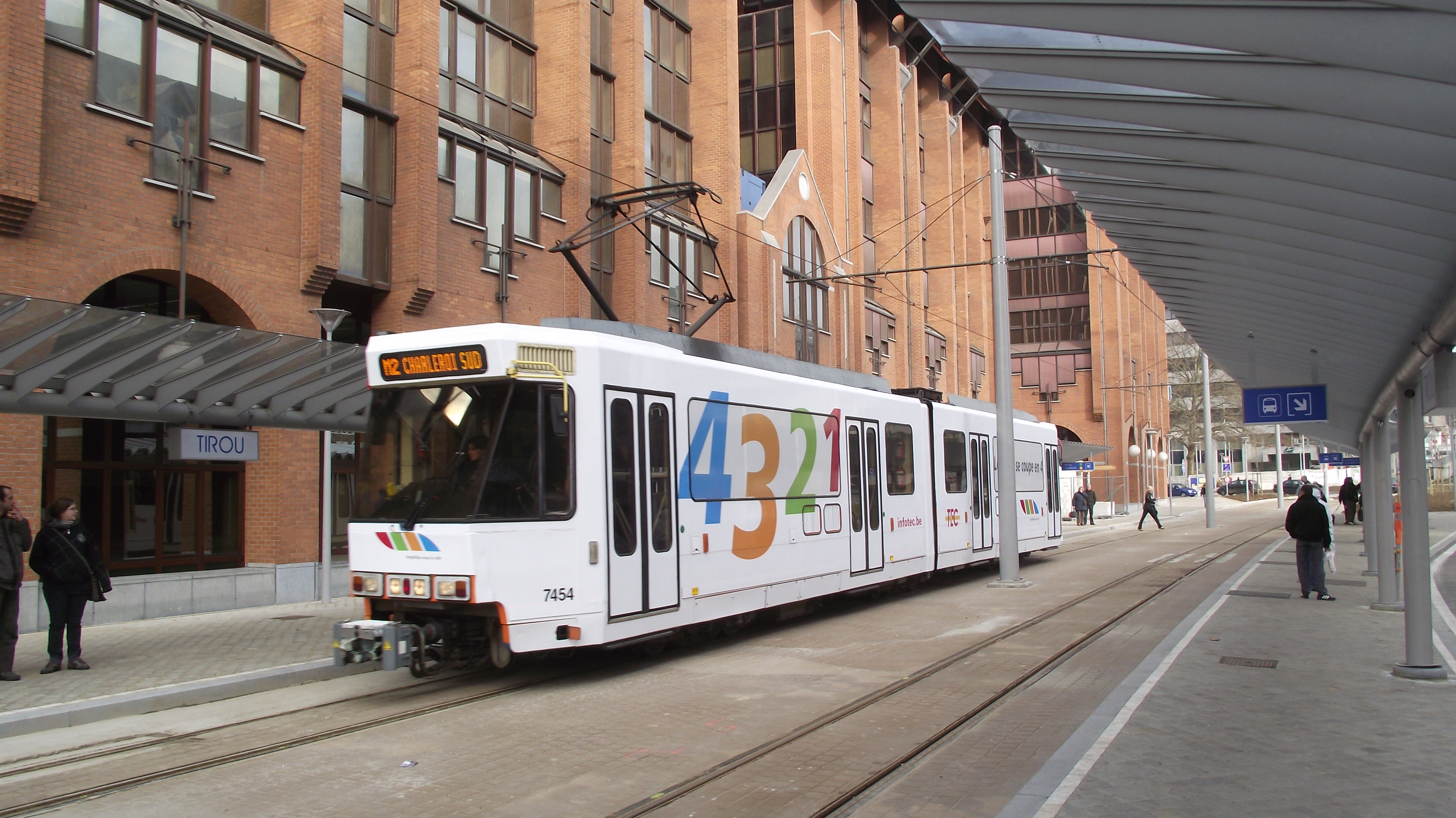
A line 2 tram at Tirou station.

Line M2 is a line of the Charleroi Metro in Belgium operated by TEC Charleroi, running from the Monument tram stop in Anderlues to the metro loop around central Charleroi, before heading back to Anderlues. Line M2 was created on 27 February 2012 (13 years ago) to replace former lines 88 and 89 after completion of the loop around central Charleroi. Introduction of new line numbers (M1, M2, M3 and M4) in February 2012 coincided with the formal association of colors to line numbers. The official color for line M2 is green.

Line M2 is identical to line M1 except that it runs along the downtown loop in a clockwise direction.

== Operations ==
Line M2 has a length of 32.12-kilometre (19.96 mi) (including the return portion to Anderlues), of which 6.98 kilometres (4.34 mi) are on a standard tram line on the street (in Anderlues) and the remainder on premetro infrastructure. It has 29 premetro stations (18 distinct) and 12 tram stops (6 distinct). Lines M1 and M2 are the longest lines of the Charleroi Metro network.

Trams drive on the right on the entire line, but the regular tram section of the line in Anderlues (outside of premetro infrastructure) runs on the left, right, or in the middle of the street. A couple of portions of that section in Anderlues are single track.

Period	First departure from Pétria	First departure from Sud	Last departure from Sud	Last arrival in Pétria	Interval between trains
Monday to Friday from January to June and from September to December	05:37	06:09	18:39	19:03	30 minutes
Monday to Friday in July and August	07:07	07:39	17:09	17:41	60 minutes 30 minutes during morning/afternoon peak times
Saturday	05:22	05:54	18:54	19:18	60 minutes
Sunday and public holidays	07:14	07:54	18:54	19:18	60 minutes

Because M2 trams going from Sud to Pétria enter Beaux-Arts station from the West and have to leave it to the West, a change of direction is required. Trams accomplish this by first passing through Beaux-Arts on a lateral track without stopping, before entering a loop-shaped tunnel leading back to the station but from the opposite direction.

== List of stations ==
=== Tram stops ===
The following tram stops are found in Anderlues on the western portion of the line:

- Monument
- Route de la station
- Jonction
- Route de Thuin
- Surchiste
- Coron du Berger

=== Premetro stations ===
The following stations are found on the premetro portion of the system in the vicinity of Charleroi:

- Pétria
- Fontaine
- Paradis
- Leernes
- Morgnies
- Moulin
- De Cartier
- Providence
- Dampremy

The following stations are found on the full metro portion of the system in central Charleroi:

- Piges
- Ouest
- Villette
- Sud
- Sambre
- Tirou
- Parc
- Janson
- Waterloo
- Beaux-Arts
