= Samaritaine metro station =

Metro station in Charleroi, Belgium

Samaritaine

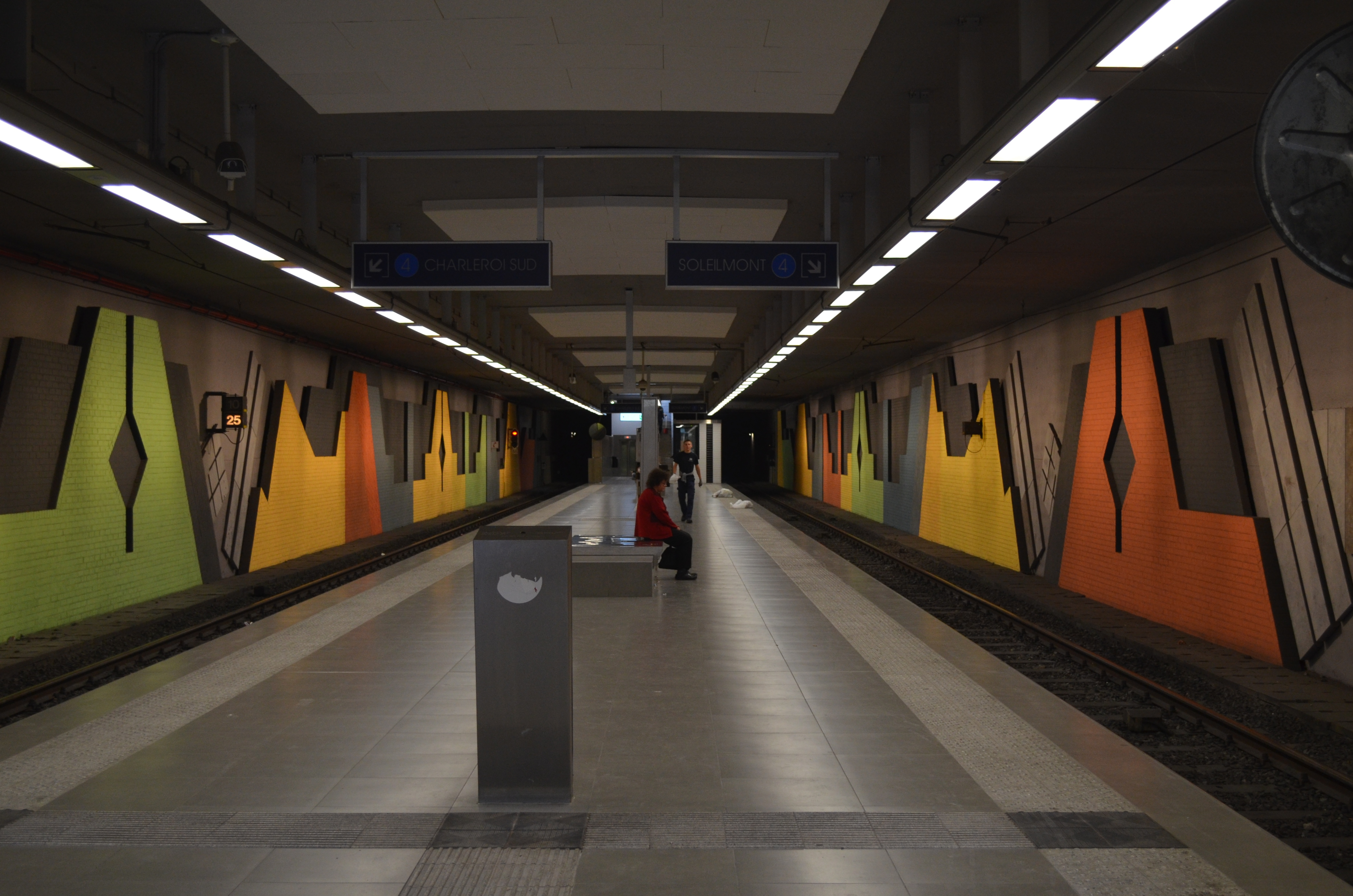

General information
- Coordinates: 50°25′12″N 4°27′41″E
- Transit authority: TEC Charleroi
- Platforms: Island platform
- Tracks: 2

History
- Opened: 28 August 1992

Services
Preceding station	Charleroi Metro	Following station
Waterloo towards Sud	M4	Gazomètre towards Soleilmont
Location

Samaritaine (French pronunciation: [samaʁitɛn]) is a Charleroi Metro station, located at the northeastern edge of downtown Charleroi, in fare zone 1. Samaritaine is an underground station featuring a central platform, with street access at both ends.

While trams run on the right on most of the network on most of the Charleroi Pre-metro network, they drive on the left on the Gilly line, of which Samaritaine is part. The change from right-hand to left-hand running occurs between Waterloo and Samaritaine.

== Nearby points of interest ==
- Ville 2 shopping mall.
- Pathé Charleroi (cinema), formerly named cinepointcom, formerly named Carolywood (largest cinema in Charleroi).
- High schools in the vicinity.

== Transfers ==
There are no direct bus transfers at this station.
