= Gilly metro station =

Metro station in Charleroi, Belgium

Gilly

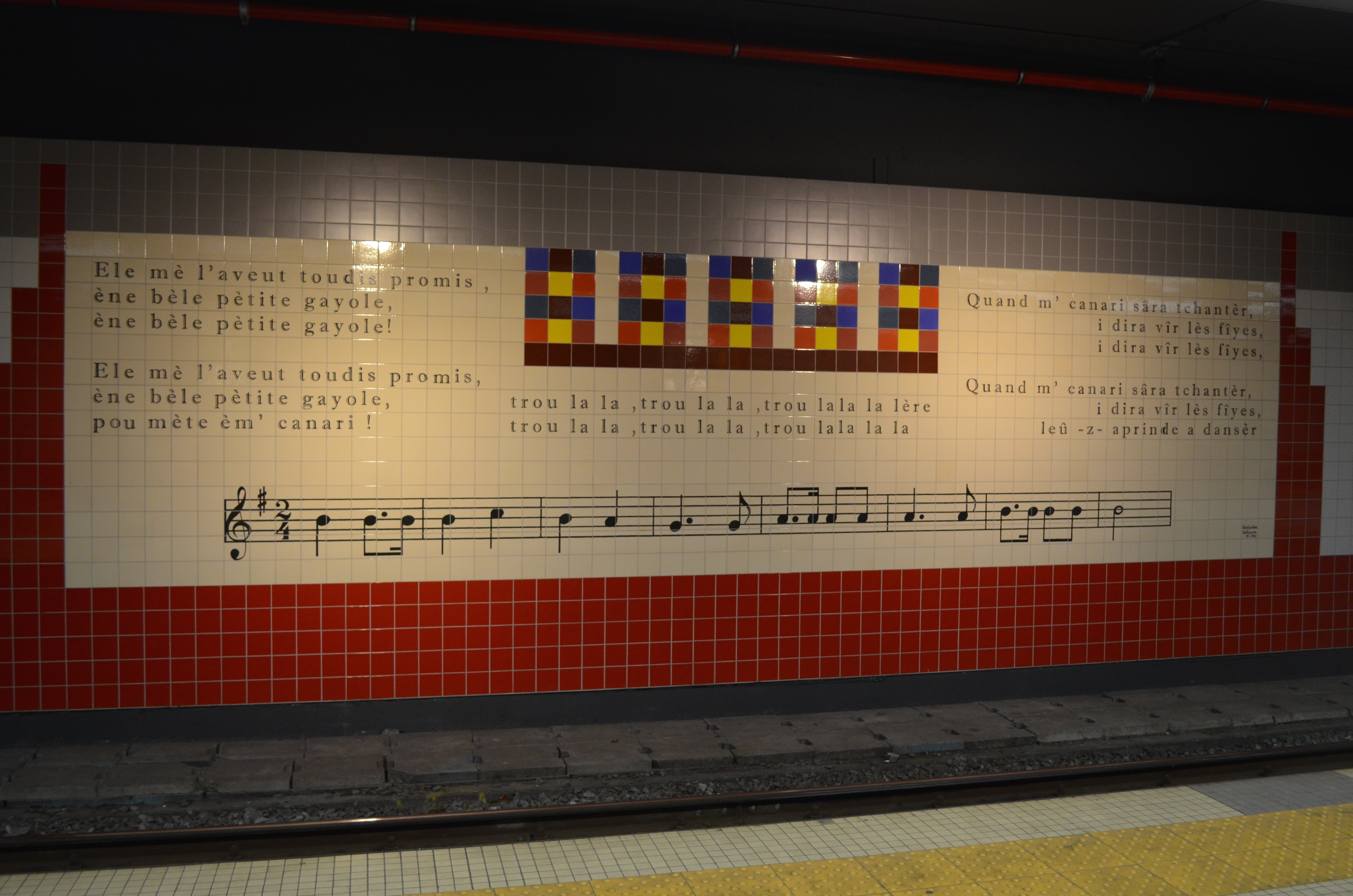
- Lyrics of La p'tite gayole.

General information
- Coordinates: 50°25′25″N 4°28′45″E
- Transit authority: TEC Charleroi
- Platforms: Island platform
- Tracks: 2
- Bus routes: 5
- Bus operators: TEC Charleroi

History
- Opened: 28 August 1992

Services
Preceding station	Charleroi Metro	Following station
Gazomètre towards Sud	M4	Marabout towards Soleilmont
Location

Gilly is a Charleroi Metro station, located in Gilly (part of the Charleroi municipality), in fare zone 2. Gilly is an underground station featuring a central platform

Until the opening of the Soleilmont extension on 27 February 2012, Gilly was the terminus of former lines 54 and 55.

Gilly station was opened on 28 August 1992, although it had been built in the eighties. It was refurbished in 2008 and reopened in its current version on 23 April 2008. One of the walls is adorned with coat of arms of other Gilly's in Europe, while the opposite wall features the lyrics of La p'tite gayole, a song in Walloon language written by Belgian artist Oscar Sabeau.

While trams drive on the right on most of the Charleroi Pre-metro network, they drive on the left on the Gilly line.

== Nearby points of interest ==
- Gilly city hall.
- Gilly municipal swimming pool.
- Athénée Royal de Gilly (school).

== Transfers ==
TEC Charleroi bus lines 27, 28, 29, 172 and 710.
