= Leernes metro station =

Metro station in Fontaine-l'Évêque, Belgium

Leernes

General information
- Coordinates: 50°24′06″N 4°20′50″E
- Transit authority: TEC Charleroi
- Platforms: Central
- Tracks: 2

Construction
- Platform levels: 1
- Parking: No

History
- Opened: 24 May 1983

Services
Preceding station	Charleroi Metro	Following station
Paradis towards Monument	M1	Morgnies towards Sud
Paradis towards Monument	M2	Morgnies towards Sud
Location

Leernes [lɛʀn] is a Charleroi Metro station, built at ground level and located in Leernes (part of the Fontaine-l'Évêque municipality), in fare zone 2. The station has only one entrance, on its eastern end.

== Nearby points of interest ==
The station is located in a rural area, relatively far from the community it is supposed to serve. The Leernes cemetery is 400 m away from the station.

== Transfers ==
There are no direct bus transfers at the station, although there is a bus stop 300 m away served by TEC Charleroi no. 173 from Monday to Saturday.
