= Charleroi Light Metro =

Light rail network in Charleroi, Belgium

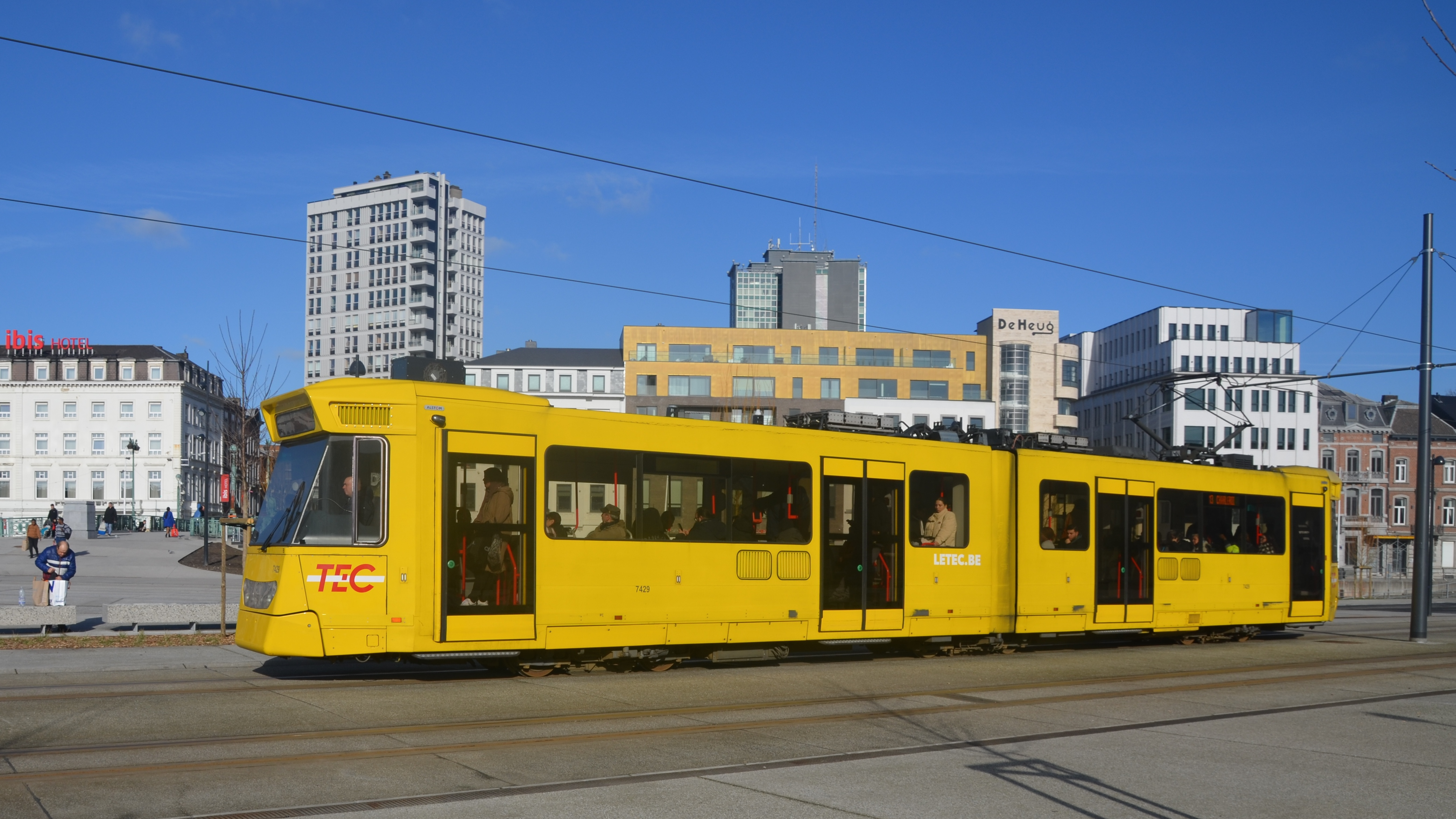

Overview
- Native name: Métro léger de Charleroi
- Owner: Opérateur de transport de Wallonie
- Locale: Charleroi, Hainaut, Belgium
- Transit type: Light rail
- Number of lines: 4
- Line number: M1, M2, M3, M4
- Number of stations: 48 (incl. 10 underground and 26 tram stops)
- Headquarters: Place des Tramways, 9/1 6000 Charleroi
- Website: TEC Homepage

Operation
- Began operation: 21 June 1976; 50 years ago
- Operator: TEC Charleroi
- Number of vehicles: 48

Technical
- System length: 33 km (21 mi)
- Track gauge: 1,000 mm (3 ft 3 3/8 in) metre gauge
- Electrification: 600 V DC overhead
Network map (as of 2026)

The Charleroi Light Metro (French: Métro Léger de Charleroi, French pronunciation: [metʁo leʒe də ʃaʁləʁwa], abbreviated as MLC, is a 33-kilometre (21 mi) light rail network in Charleroi, Belgium.

The system consists of a loop line around central Charleroi and three branches towards the suburbs of Gilly, Anderlues and Gosselies. Another branch to Châtelet (historically, the third one) was partially built, never entered service, but will finally do so in 2027.

The original plan was much more extensive with eight branches radiating from the central loop, by gradually upgrading the existing tram network with grade separated sections. Full completion had to be abandoned due to high costs and low prospective ridership rates. As a result, a significant part of the network consists of tram infrastructure and is operated with high-floor trams. The system functions partly as a tram and partly as a metro.

The system was opened in seven phases ranging from 1976 to 2012, which included 30 stops, of which 22 were stations as of 2012 along with two regular tram stops in Charleroi (the loop) and six in Anderlues. On 22 June 2013, 18 more tram stops were added to the network when line M3 to Gosselies went into service. Despite not meeting full metro standards, it is locally also referred to as the Métro Carolo or simply Le Métro in French.

== Operations ==
As of June 2013, the network consists in a central loop running around the centre of Charleroi and comprising six stations and two tram stops, from which three branches radiate to suburbs:

- A 14 km (8.7 mi) branch with ten stations and six tram stops runs west to Anderlues. This branch runs on the street as a normal tram after Pétria station, following a line of the old vicinal network.
- A 4 km (2.5 mi) branch with six stations runs northeast to Gilly.
- A 7.5 km (4.7 mi) branch with 18 tram stops runs north to Gosselies.

In addition, another branch is currently inactive:

- A branch running east towards Châtelet was built during the 1980s. A first section comprising four stations was completed but never entered service, while further sections are in various stages of completion.

The network allows transfers to the national railway network at the main Charleroi-Central railway station as well as at the secondary Charleroi-Ouest station.

=== Lines ===
The completion and opening of the central loop in 2012 led to a significant reorganization of the metro/tram lines previously operating on the system. The five former lines – 54, 55, 84, 88, and 89 – that operated on the network were replaced on 27 February 2012 by three new lines (M1, M2 and M4); a fourth line (M3) went into service on 22 June 2013.

Lines of the Métro Léger de Charleroi
Existing
Line	Route	Opened	Length	Stations
M1	Anderlues-Monument – Piges – Ouest – Villette – Gare Centrale – Sambre – Tirou – Janson – Parc – Waterloo – Palais – Piges – Anderlues-Monument (anticlockwise)	27 February 2012	32.1 km (19.9 mi)	28 (18 distinct) + 12 tram stops (6 distinct)
M2	Anderlues-Monument – Piges – Palais – Waterloo – Janson – Parc – Tirou – Sambre – Gare Centrale – Villette – Ouest – Palais – Piges – Anderlues-Monument (clockwise)	27 February 2012	32.1 km (19.9 mi)	29 (18 distinct)
M3	Gosselies-Faubourg de Bruxelles – Piges – Palais – Waterloo – Janson – Parc – Tirou – Sambre – Gare Centrale – Villette – Ouest – Palais – Piges – Gosselies-Faubourg de Bruxelles (clockwise)	22 June 2013	19.5 km (12.1 mi)	11 (9 distinct) + 27 tram stops (18 distinct)
M4	Soleilmont – Waterloo – Palais – Ouest – Villette – Gare Centrale – Sambre – Tirou – Janson – Parc – Waterloo – Soleilmont (anticlockwise)	27 February 2012	12.0 km (7.5 mi)	21 (14 distinct)
Under construction
M5	Les Viviers – Waterloo – Palais – Ouest – Villette – Gare Centrale – Sambre – Tirou – Parc – Janson – Waterloo – Les Viviers (anticlockwise)	planned for 2027	5.5 km (3.4 mi)	17 (8 distinct)

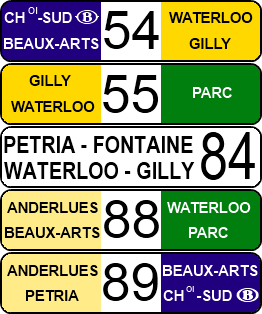
Destination display on trams prior to 2012.

The system is run by TEC Charleroi, a subsidiary of the Walloon public transport operator (Société Régionale Wallonne du Transport). Intervals between trains depend on the period (weekdays/weekends, holidays, etc.). The standard interval is 30 minutes for lines M1 and M2, ensuring a 15 minutes interval on the Charleroi – Anderlues section. This interval becomes 60 minutes (30 minutes on the common section) on weekends and holidays, and during the July–August period. On line M4, the standard interval is 10 minutes (15 minutes on Sundays and public holidays); similarly, line M3 also runs with 10-minute intervals.

From 2012 on, all trams have been equipped with orange colored LED destination indicators, displaying the line number and final station. Prior to that, mechanical destination indicators were used, using various layouts. The most common display showed two distinctly colored rectangles indicating the most important stations of the line, with the line number displayed on a white square between both rectangles. Rectangle color used the following code:

- Pale yellow : used on lines originating/terminating in Anderlues.
- Bright yellow : used on lines originating/terminating at Gilly.
- Dark blue : used on lines originating/terminating at Sud.
- Dark green : used on lines originating/terminating at Parc.

Beside this system, it happened that trams only displayed the terminus station as one of Charleroi-Sud (dark blue background) or Parc (green), without line number. Line 84 used a completely different display with black characters on a completely white background and line number on the right.

Trams run on the right track, except on the Soleilmont branch and the out-of-service Châtelet branch. Some short street-running sections in Anderlues and in Gosselies are single track. Theoretical maximum speed on the network is 65 km/h (40 mph), but actual speed is generally lower, especially on curves. Speed limits are displayed on panels along the track and can take one of the following values : 10 km/h (6.2 mph), 17 km/h (11 mph), 25 km/h (16 mph), 35 km/h (22 mph), 45 km/h (28 mph), 55 km/h (34 mph) and 65 km/h (40 mph). An onboard system warns the driver in case of overspeed, and will stop the tram abruptly in absence of reaction. A similar system will stop the tram immediately in the event of a red signal being ignored. Rail switches are controlled directly by tram drivers using a remote control unit sending a signal to a receiver along the track.

=== Stations ===
Station entrance sign, identical to the one used in Brussels.

As of 2013, the Charleroi network comprises 48 stations (24 metro stations and 24 tram stops) served by four lines. There are also 3 unused stations on the unfinished Châtelet branch (see below).

Station entrances are marked with a stylized white "M" on a blue background, identical to the symbol used by the Brussels metro. Access to the platforms is unrestricted (no gates/barriers) and most stations are not staffed. Some stations are equipped with automatic ticket vending machines; otherwise tickets are sold by machines inside the trams (tickets used to be sold directly by the tram drivers until 2012).

=== Rolling stock ===
==== Passenger cars ====
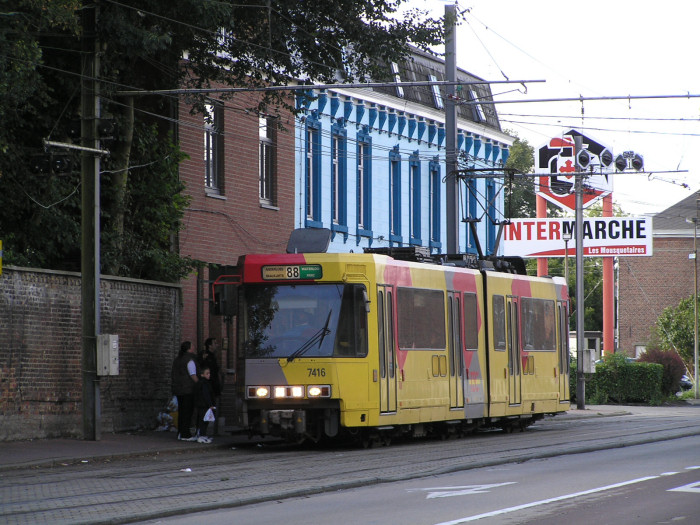
A Charleroi metro BN tram in TEC Charleroi livery.

Charleroi's LRV cars are bi-directional articulated trams which were supplied by La Brugeoise et Nivelles (BN) (with ACEC providing the motors and the electrical/electronic components) from 1980 to 1982. They are similar to the trams operated on the Belgian coast tram line (although those have doors on only one side) and, to a lesser extent, to the first generation trains of the Manila Light Rail Transit System yellow line.

According to an official statement by TEC Charleroi, 44 of these trams are operational, the future network with the completed downtown loop and the Gilly branch extension requiring 22, then 35 when the Gosselies branch opens.

Each unit has a length of 22.88 m (75 ft 1 in) and a width of 2.5 m (8 ft 2 in), and is capable of carrying 44 seated and 148 standing passengers (6 pax/m^{2}), totalling 192 passengers. (Note: An original SNCV brochure mentions 98 standing pax at 4 pax/m^{2}, however indications inside trams mention a total capacity of 192, which equates to (192 total – 44 seats = 148 standing pax).) It is powered by two electric engines providing a total power of 456 kW (612 hp). Their maximum speed is 65 km/h (40 mph). They can theoretically be coupled to form trains of up to three trams, however the single tram configuration is the preferred one on the Charleroi network, with only a few peak hour services on line M4 being operated by 2 trams coupled together.

Most trams carry the distinctive bright yellow, red and grey livery of TEC Charleroi and are identified by a 4 digit number starting with 74. Six trams (7404, 7426, 7428, 7448, 7453 and 7454) wear a temporary special livery to celebrate the new lines created on 27 February 2012. Prior to that date, several trams were still wearing the old SNCV livery with an orange bottom and beige top separated by a blue line (with a 4-digit fleet number starting with 61).

==== Work cars ====
- Type S – SNCV Hainaut – work car
- Type SJ – SNCV Hainaut – passenger cars – acquired 1984
- Esslingen/Schorling tram – track scrubber – acquired 1981

== History ==
Original plan for Charleroi Metro network.

The Charleroi metro was planned in the 1960s as a 52 km (32 mi) network, consisting of eight branch lines radiating from a central downtown loop and no less than 69 stations. If completed as planned, this would have been the largest metro system in the Benelux region.

In the 1960s, Charleroi already had an extensive tramway network, operated by both SNCV and STIC, but trams were starting to be replaced by buses as those were supposedly more flexible, were cheaper to operate and were perceived as more modern. The metro network was meant to offer trams a second life by providing a fast and comfortable mass transit system, while removing them from the street.

Full completion of the initial project was envisioned between 1992 and 1994. As a general rule, plans called for tracks to be at ground level, on dedicated infrastructure (separated from the street). If not possible, priority was given to viaducts, and tunnels were considered as the last option, except in Charleroi downtown or in densely populated areas.

The first section opened on 21 June 1976, between Sud and Villette (which was the first metro station in Belgium to be built on a viaduct). These were served by what would eventually become line 89 of the original light metro system.

Piges and Ouest were opened 4 years later, on 30 June 1980. Each time a new section was inaugurated, trams would transit through it before going back to the street for the remainder of their journey.

Stations Palais, Dampremy, and the section between Morgnies and Paradis were opened on 24 May 1983. Pétria followed on 24 May 1986. The same year, works were completed on a first section of the Châtelet branch (until Centenaire station), however this branch has never been put into service.

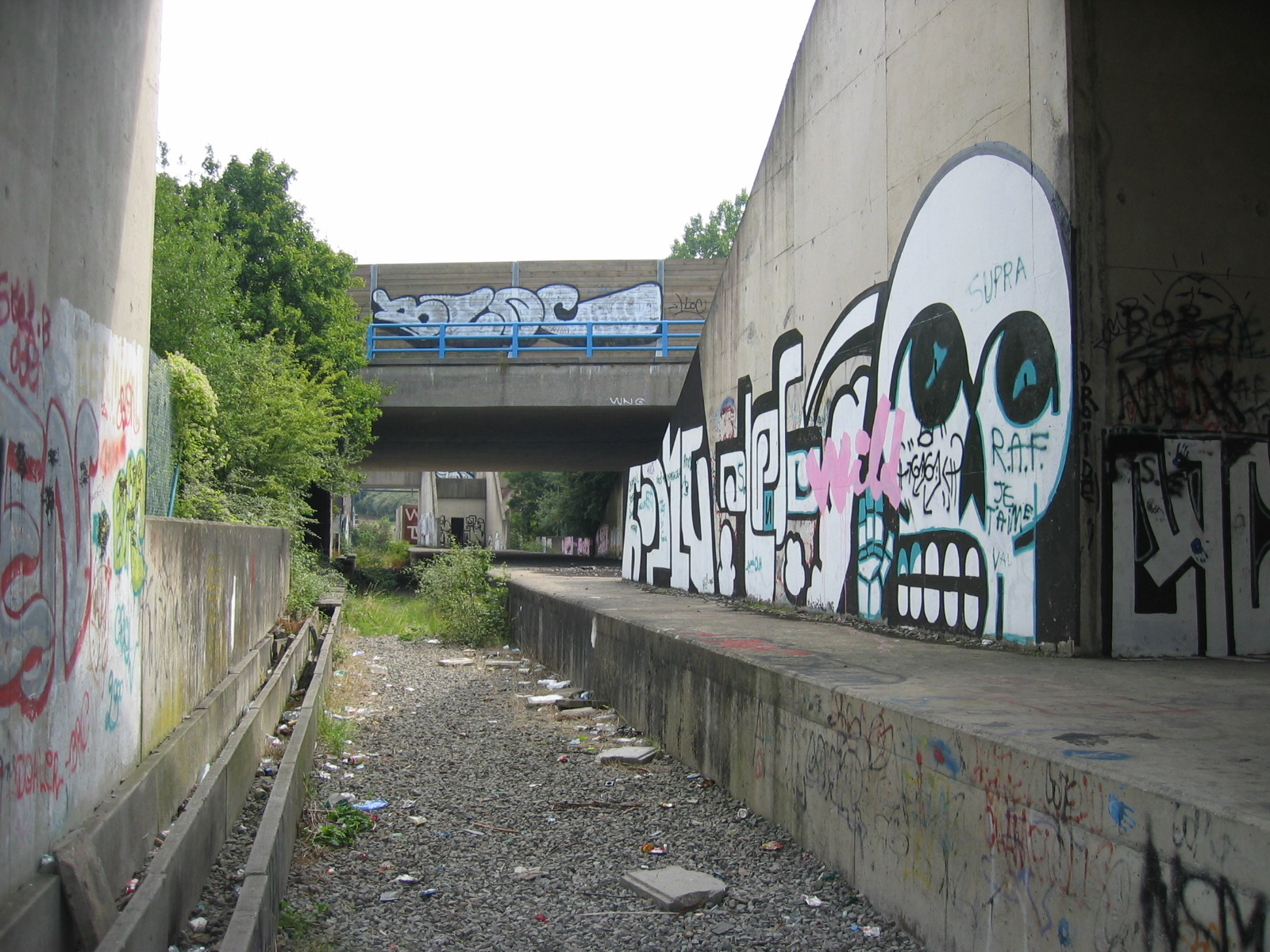
Unfinished Sart-Culpart station on the Gilly/Soleilmont branch in 2005, demolished in 2011

The remaining stations on the Anderlues branch (Providence, De Cartier, Moulin and Fontaine) were opened on 22 August 1992. One week later, on 28 August, a first section of the Gilly branch (from the downtown loop until Gilly) was inaugurated, along with the Waterloo station on the downtown loop. At the time, infrastructure beyond Gilly to Soleilmont was in various stages of completion, but not in service. 54 was created to serve the new branch.

On 30 August 1996, two additional stations were opened on the downtown loop (Janson and Parc). Lines 55 and 88 were created to duplicate the two existing lines while using the northern part of the unfinished loop.

2008 and 2009 saw the resumption of metro construction, following a 75 million euro loan from the European Investment Bank, out of a total estimated cost of 150 million euro. Work to complete the downtown loop started on 20 October 2008, building of the Gosselies branch on 16 March 2009, and the lengthening works on the Gilly branch toward Soleilmont started on 30 March 2009.

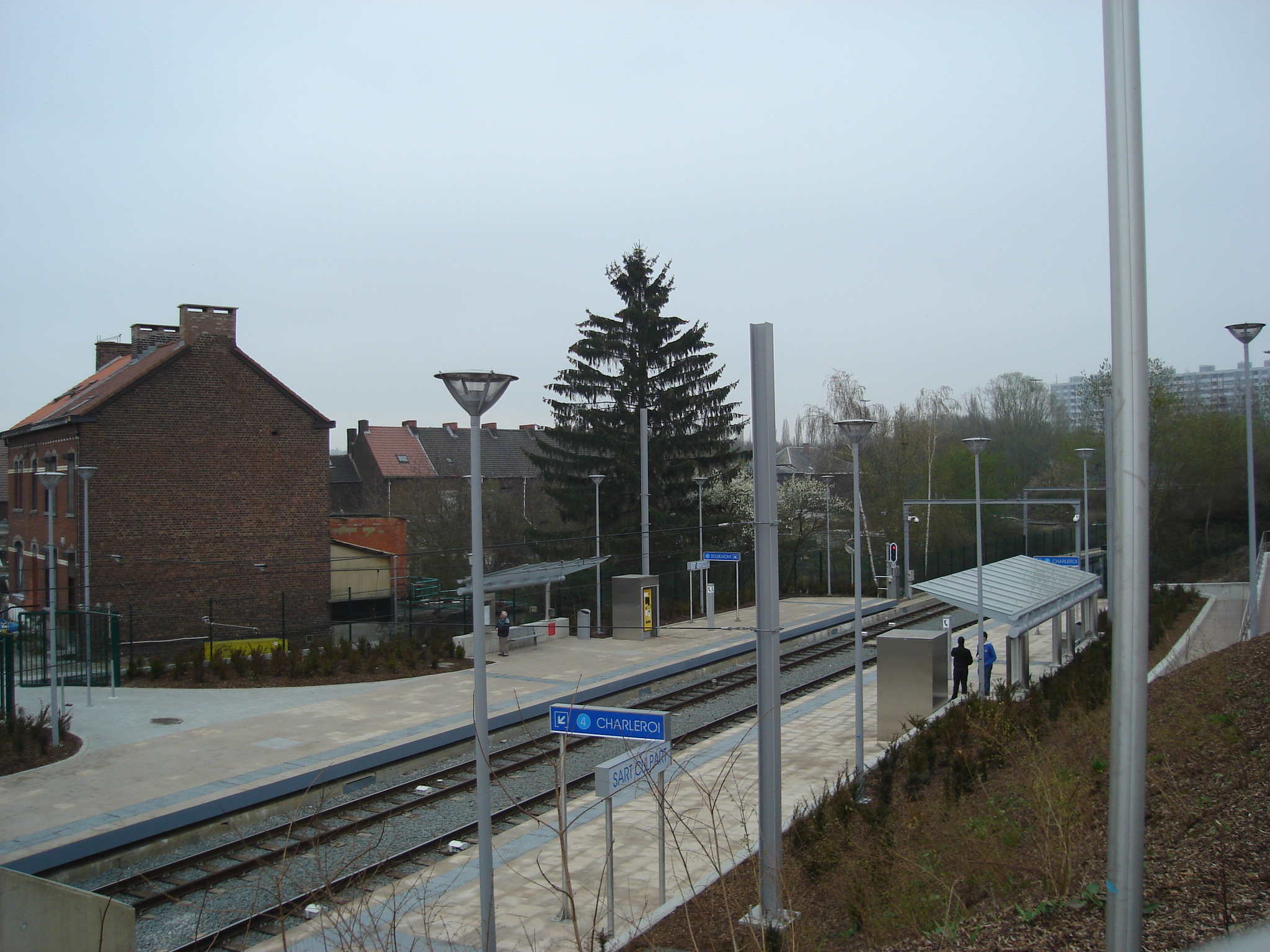
New Sart-Culpart station relocated about 250 m to the west, opened in 2012

The finished downtown loop was put in service on 27 February 2012 with the completion of the Sud to Parc section. The same day saw the opening of the Soleilmont extension of the Gilly branch. The completion of the downtown loop involved a comprehensive reorganization of the lines and the introduction of new numbers (M1, M2 and M4) and colors, and the inauguration of the now "Charleroi Metro".

The Gosselies branch (Line M3) project created a new branch starting at Piges station and running as a regular tramway line toward Gosselies. A large section of the line already existed to the Jumet tram depot, but as it is only used by empty trams going to and from the depot, and was not equipped for commercial passenger transport, it had to be completely rebuilt. The Jumet to Gosselies section is new, although it is built on the site of former SNCV tramway lines.

The project included full renovation of the Chaussée de Bruxelles (Brussels Road) which is used by the new line. Because of the narrowness of some streets in Gosselies, the line uses single track in different streets for each direction.

The Gosselies branch was scheduled for completion in 2011, however multiple obstacles had delayed its opening. The fourth line of the Charleroi Metro thus entered service on 22 June 2013. This northern branch is served by a new line, dubbed "M3" (yellow color), which is how it is now depicted on official maps and on station signage.

=== Expansion plans ===
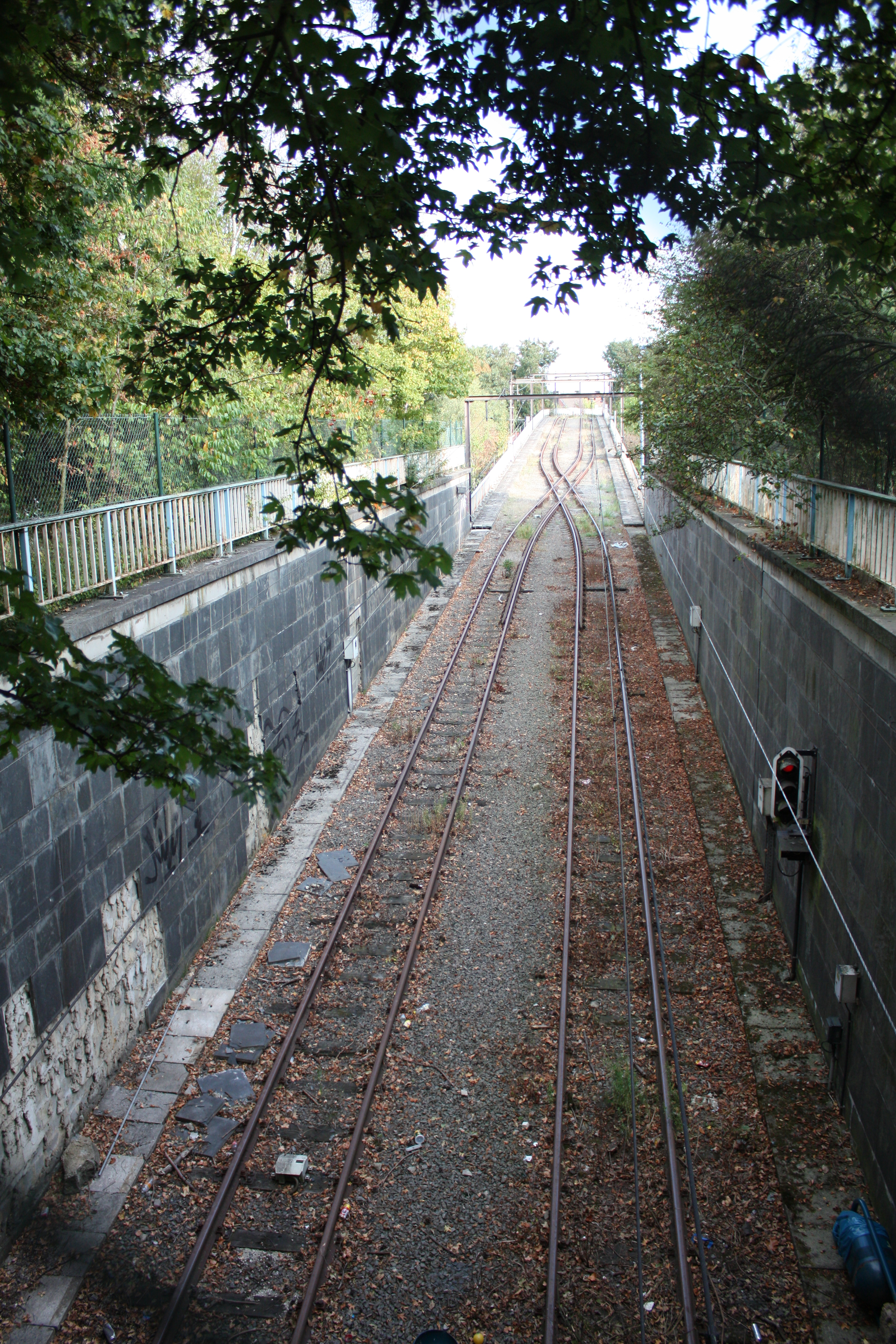
Unused section between Waterloo and Neuville stations, showing crossover

==== Châtelet line: Line M5 branch ====
The original metro project envisioned an eastern branch from Waterloo station (then Nord) to Châtelet, comprising eight stations. Construction of this branch began in the 1980s and resulted in a first 4 km (2.5 mi) section in various stages of completion.

The Waterloo to Centenaire part has been finished, but was never put into service. As a result, the finished Neuville, Chet, Pensée and Centenaire stations remained closed and were vandalized. Sometime in the 2010s, the station building of Centenaire was demolished. The track until Chet (now Yernaux) was used for driver training, so rails and catenary were maintained. Occasionally, special journeys were organised to the station Centenaire on the colloquially named "Métro Fantôme" (ghost metro), including in March 2017.

Only structural work was completed on the Centenaire to Roctiau part, with no tracks installed. The rest of the branch has never been built.

In 2011 preliminary estimates gave a cost of 5 million euros to refresh the Waterloo-Centenaire section, and another 20 million to complete the line to Corbeau (serving a nearby popular shopping mall).

In early 2021, TEC Charleroi announced that the Châtelet branch may be finally completed, and the existing part of the branch renewed, using the funds from the Charleroi's €250 million share of the Walloon Recovery Plan. If given the go-ahead, the line was expected to open by 2026. The funding has been confirmed on 23 June 2021, the project will benefit from €60 million to be used to revitalise the line between Waterloo and Pensée, the last complete station on the line, and to extend it to Viviers to provide connection to the new hospital under construction and due to open in 2024. In January 2023 the building permit for the track, eight stations, and a service building was granted, construction work started November 2024 and the opening is planned for 2027.

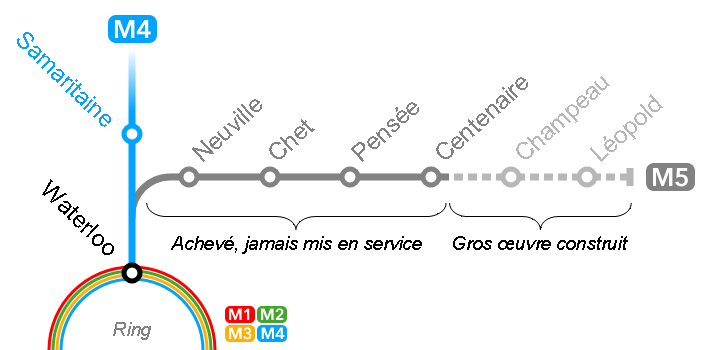
Map of the original Châtelet line: Line M5 branch

=== Tram renewal ===
Le Tec in Charleroi on 21 June 2022 presents its first tram with a new look. This renewal operation will involve 12 vehicles per year until 2026. This investment has a total amount of 22 million euros to renew the entire fleet, 500,000 euros per tram. It was assigned to Alstom, which is in charge of most of the work and is subcontracting certain aspects, in collaboration with Entra, an adapted work company based in Fleurus.

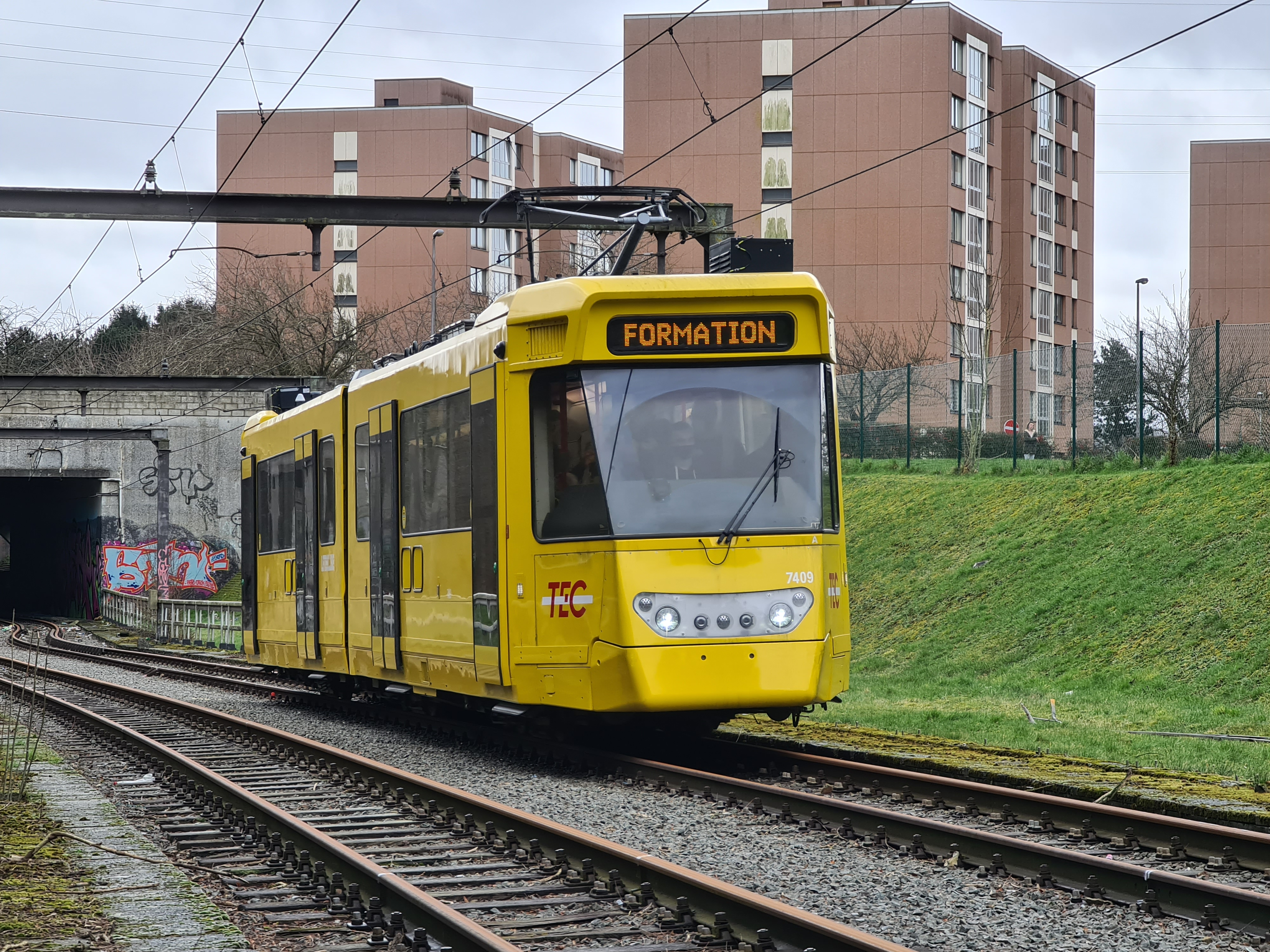
The restyled tram model

== See also ==
- List of Charleroi Metro stations
- List of Charleroi Metro former lines
- Vicinal tramway
- Transport in Belgium
- List of rapid transit systems
- Brussels Metro
