= Charleroi Metro line 4 =

Transit line in Charleroi, Belgium

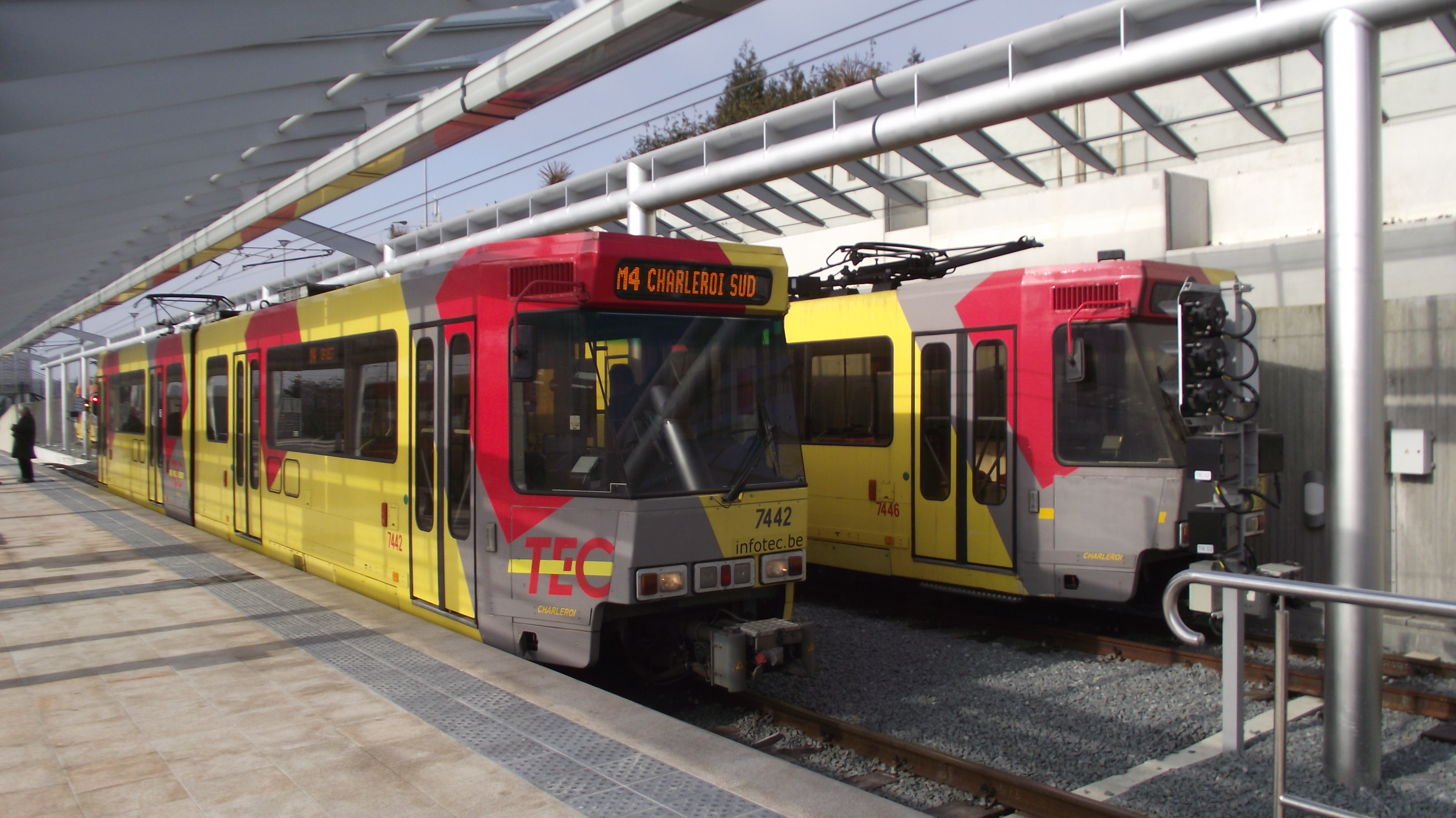
A line 4 tram at its Soleimont terminus.

Line 4 is a line of the Charleroi Metro in Belgium operated by TEC Charleroi, running from Soleimont in Gilly (northeast of Charleroi) to the loop around downtown Charleroi, before heading back to Soleilmont.

Line 4 was inaugurated on 27 February 2012 (13 years ago) and replaced former lines 54 and 55 following the completion of the metro loop line around downtown Charleroi. Introduction of new line numbers (1, 2, 3 and 4) in February 2012 coincided with the formal association of colors to line numbers. The official color for line 4 is blue.

== Operations ==
Line 4 has a length of 12 kilometres (7.5 mi) (including the return portion to Soleilmont), all on premetro infrastructure. It has 21 premetro stations (14 distinct). Line 4 is the shortest line of the Charleroi Metro network.

Trams drive on the right on the downtown loop, and on the left on the Soleimont branch (they switch sides between Waterloo and Samaritaine).

Trams on line 4 run from 05:00 until 20:00, with frequencies of:

- Every 10 minutes from Monday to Saturday except public holidays.
- Every 15 minutes on Sundays and public holidays.

=== Replacement night bus service ===
A replacement bus service, similarly numbered M4ab on timetables (with "ab" standing for "autobus"), operates with roughly the same itinerary, from 20:00 to 23:00 (6 departures in each direction on weekdays, less on week-ends and holidays).

== List of stations ==
The following stations are found on the premetro portion of the M4 line east of Charleroi:

- Soleilmont
- Sart-Culpart
- Marabout
- Gilly
- Gazomètre
- Samaritaine

The following stations are found on the full metro portion of the system in central Charleroi:

- Waterloo
- Beaux-Arts
- Ouest
- Villette
- Sud
- Sambre
- Tirou
- Parc
- Janson
