= De Cartier metro station =

Metro station in Charleroi, Belgium

De Cartier

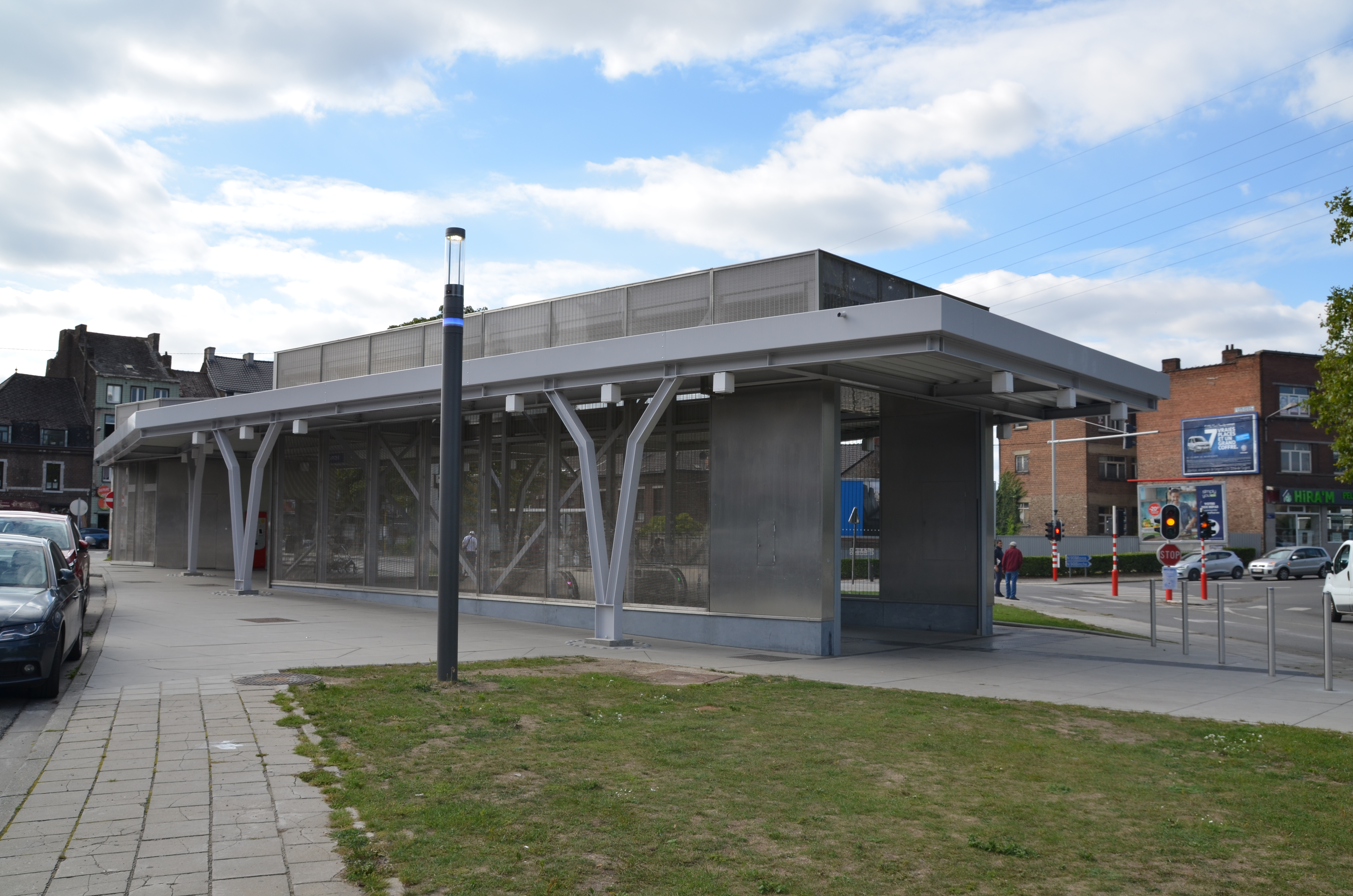
- Outside of the station in 2019.

General information
- Coordinates: 50°24′25″N 4°23′43″E
- Transit authority: TEC Charleroi
- Platforms: Central
- Tracks: 2
- Bus routes: 9
- Bus operators: TEC Charleroi

Construction
- Parking: Yes

History
- Opened: 24 August 1992

Services
Preceding station	Charleroi Metro	Following station
Moulin towards Monument	M1	Providence towards Sud
Moulin towards Monument	M2	Providence towards Sud
Location

De Cartier (French pronunciation: [də kaʁtje]) is a Charleroi Metro station, located in the center of Marchienne-au-Pont (part of the Charleroi municipality), in fare zone 2. It is an underground station featuring a central platform with escalator and stairs access at both ends.

The interior of the station, designed by architect Noterman, features a large mural depicting Marchienne-au-Pont somewhere between the 16th and 18th century. Reproductions of old, tilted walls are used as decoration on the opposite side of the station.

== Nearby points of interest ==
- De Cartier castle (French: Château de Cartier), which has given its name to the station.
- Municipal park of Marchienne-au-Pont.
- Marchienne-au-Pont public swimming pool.
- Marchienne-au-Pont city hall.
- Schools: Notre-Dame and Athénée Royal Yvonne Vieslet.
- Our Lady of Mercy church.
- Marchienne-au-Pont soccer stadium.

== Transfers ==
TEC Charleroi bus lines 43, 71, 72, 75, 77, 109a, 172, V2.
