= Providence metro station =

Metro station in Charleroi, Belgium

Providence

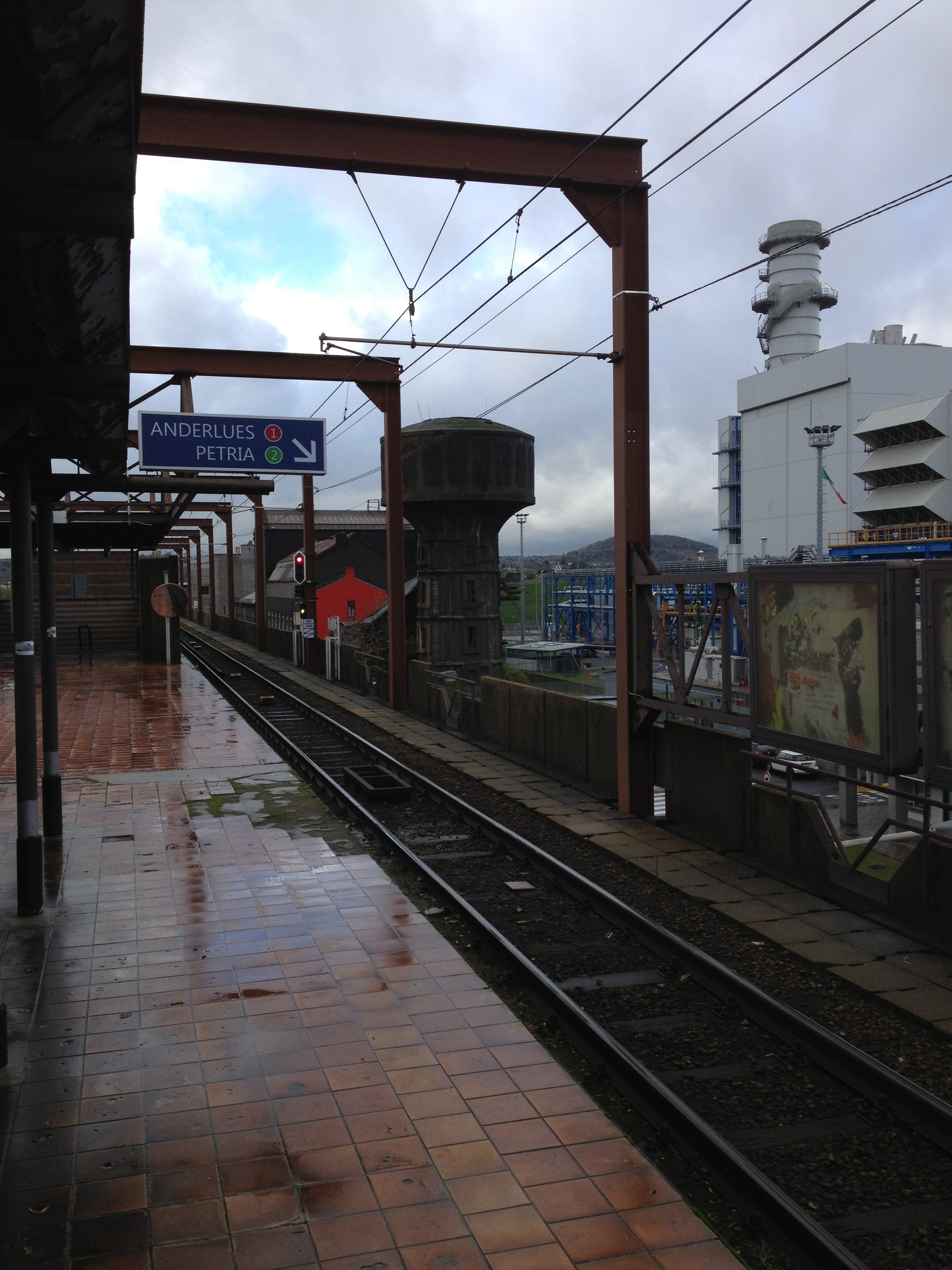

General information
- Coordinates: 50°24′46″N 4°24′28″E
- Transit authority: TEC
- Platforms: Central
- Tracks: 2

Construction
- Parking: No

History
- Opened: 24 August 1992

Services
Preceding station	Charleroi Metro	Following station
De Cartier towards Monument	M1	Dampremy towards Sud
De Cartier towards Monument	M2	Dampremy towards Sud
Location

Providence (French pronunciation: [pʁɔvidɑ̃s]) is a Charleroi Metro station, built on a viaduct and located in Marchienne-au-Pont, Belgium (part of the Charleroi municipality), in fare zone 1. The station has only one entrance (on its western end), equipped with escalators and stairs.

About 300 m east of the station (toward Dampremy), as space was insufficient for 2 tram tracks because of the presence of industrial buildings, both tracks are merged into a single one for a couple of metres. At this point, speed is restricted to 25 km/h.

The name of the station comes from the now defunct Forges de la Providence steel factory which was located in front of where the station now is, and also gave its name to the adjacent street.

== Nearby points of interest ==
The station is located on the Sambre river bank, in a dense industrial area which explains the low passenger flow through the station.

== Transfers ==
TEC Charleroi bus lines 43, 50, 51, 52, 71, 72, 73, 74, 75, 83.
