= Janson metro station =

Metro station in Charleroi, Belgium

Janson

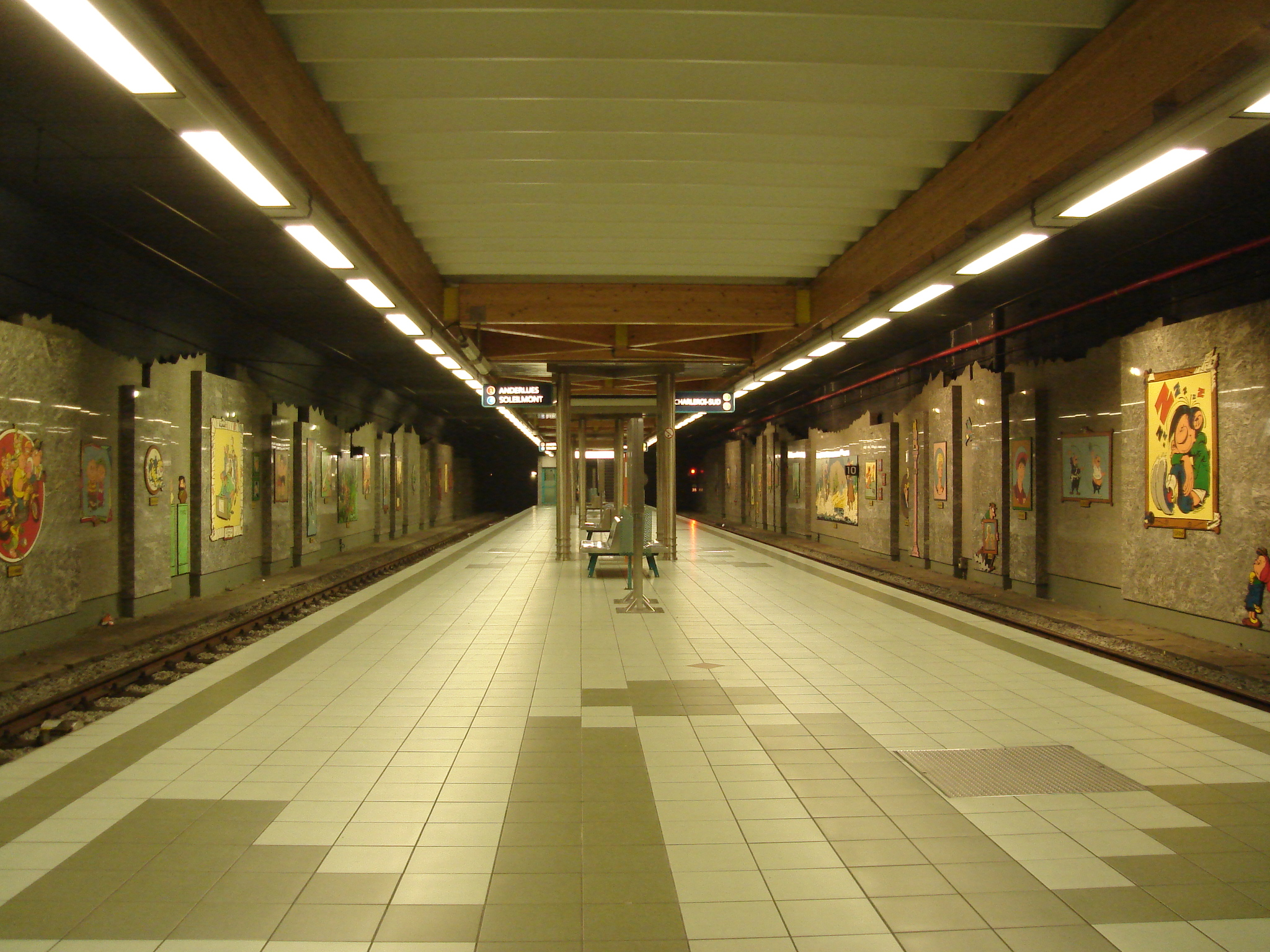

General information
- Coordinates: 50°24′47″N 4°27′07″E
- Transit authority: TEC Charleroi
- Platforms: Central
- Tracks: 2

Construction
- Platform levels: 2
- Parking: No

History
- Opened: 30 August 1996

Services
Preceding station	Charleroi Metro	Following station
Parc One-way operation	M1	Waterloo towards Monument
Parc towards Monument	M2	Waterloo One-way operation
Parc towards Faubourg de Bruxelles	M3	Waterloo One-way operation
Parc One-way operation	M4	Waterloo towards Soleilmont
Location

Janson is a Charleroi Metro station, located in downtown Charleroi, Belgium, in fare zone 1. It is an underground station featuring a central platform, with street access at both ends.

Interior decoration, designed by architect Jean Yernaux, is themed around the Belgian comics characters from Dupuis Publishing, a well-known Belgian comics publishing company based in Marcinelle (part of the Charleroi municipality).

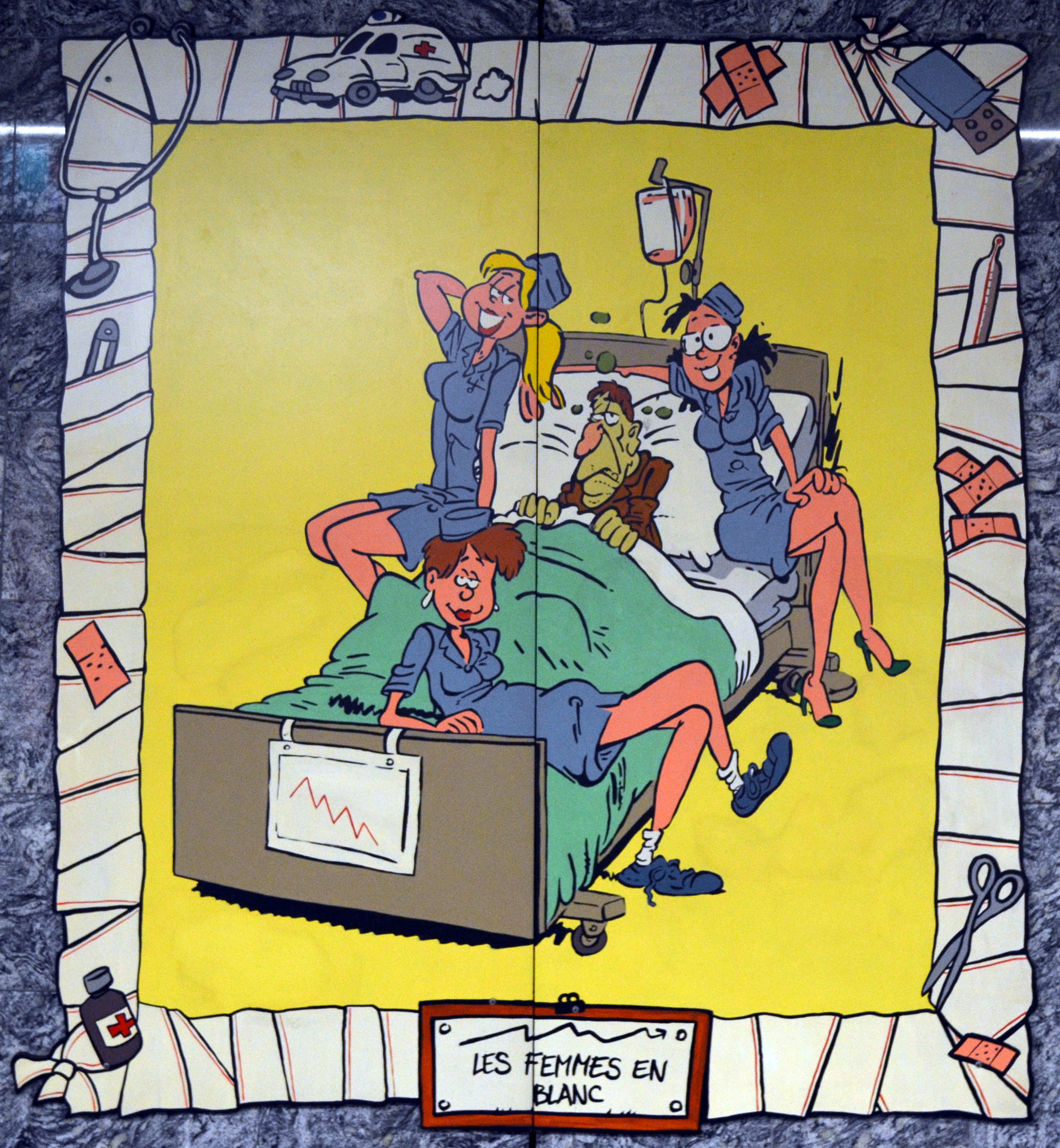
Les Femmes en Blanc.

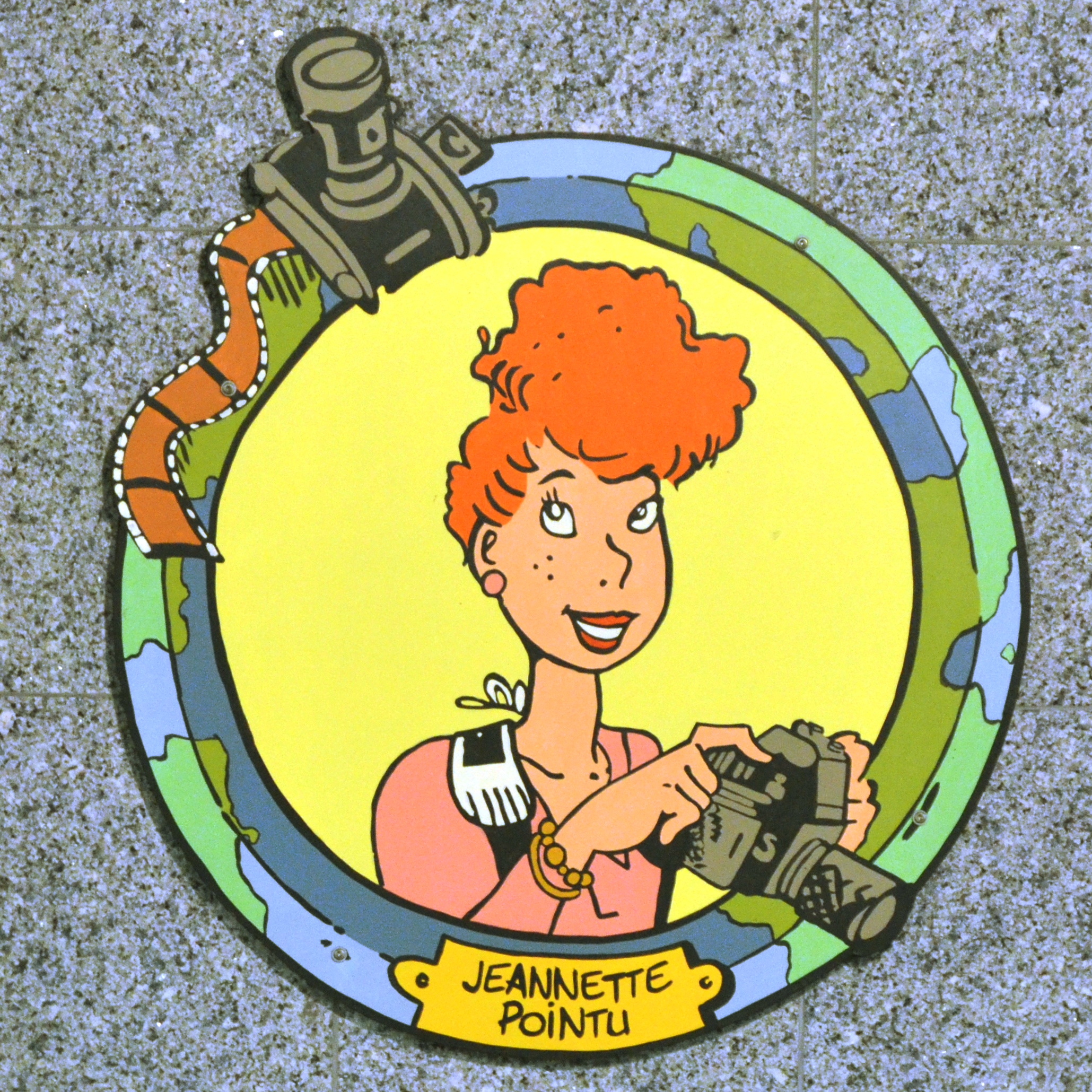
Jeannette Pointu.

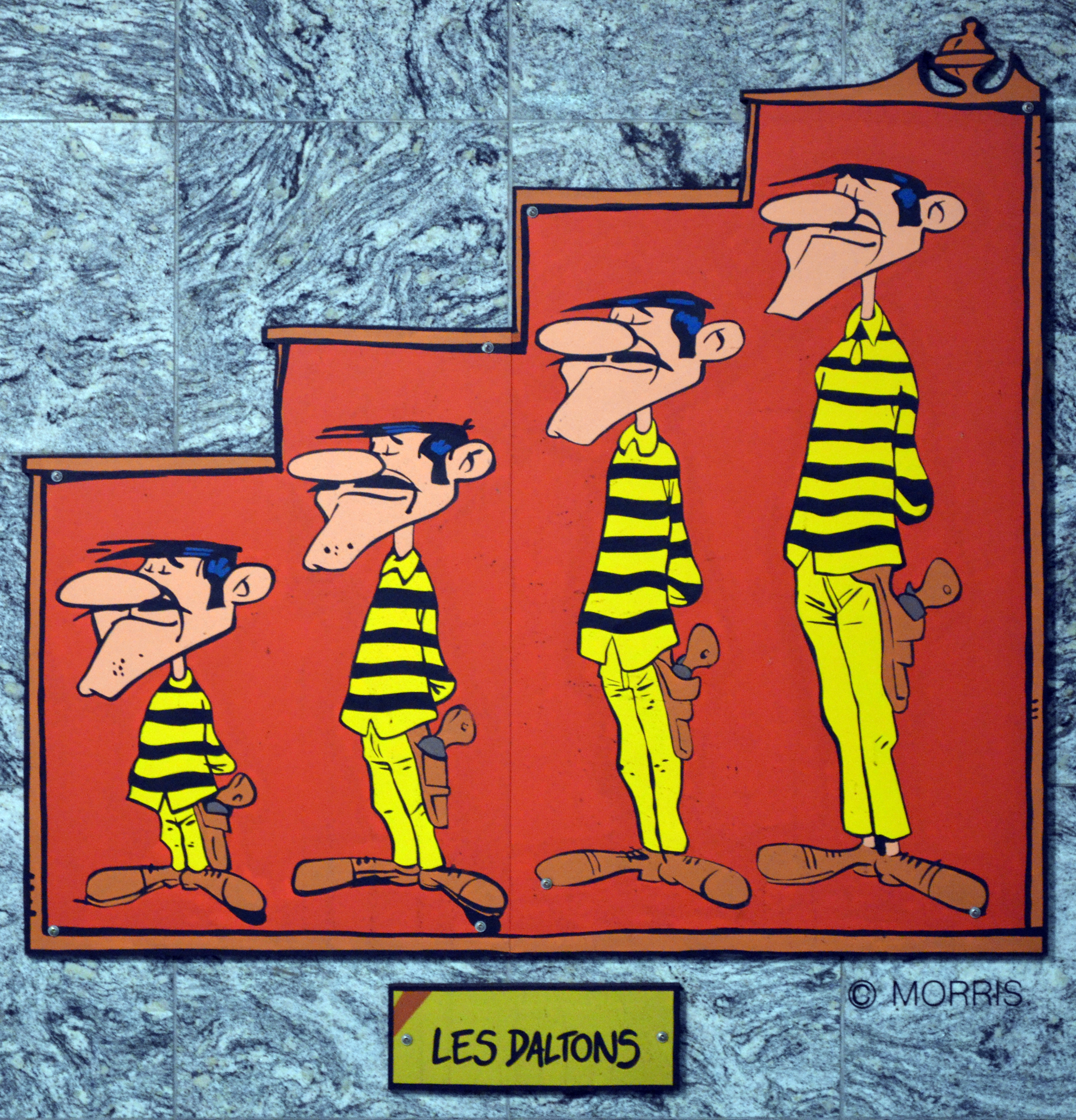
The Daltons.

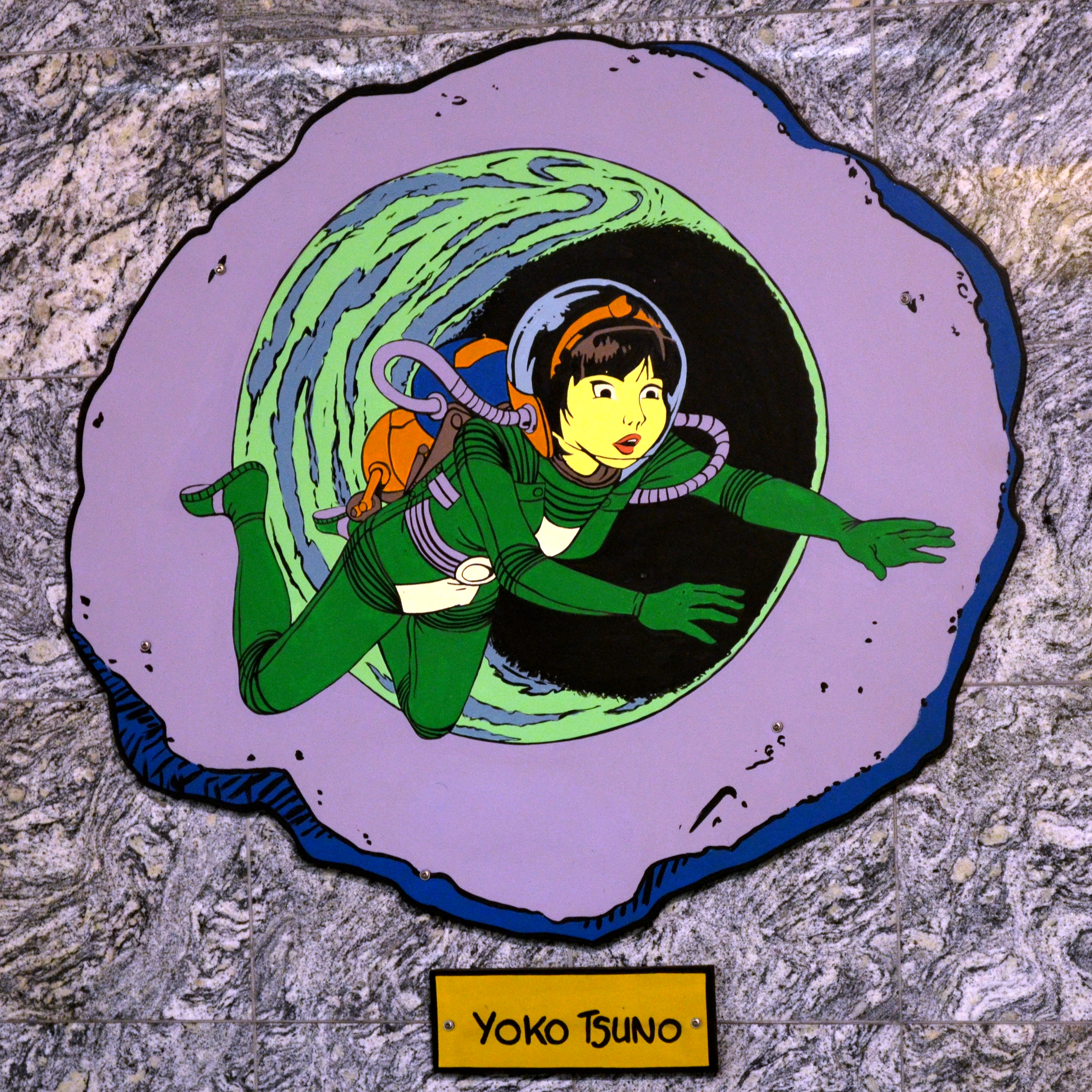
Yoko Tsuno.

The station and the nearby Paul Janson Boulevard are named after Belgian politician Paul Janson.

== Nearby points of interest ==
- CHU de Charleroi / Hôpital Civil hospital.
- Stade du Pays de Charleroi (soccer stadium).
- Chasseurs à pied museum, in the Trésignies barrack.
- Spirou, Fantasio and Spip roundabout
- Mambourg Polyclinic

== Transfers ==
TEC Charleroi bus lines 52, 71, 74, 86, 154, 158, E, City-Bus.
