= Moulin metro station =

Metro station in Charleroi, Belgium

Moulin

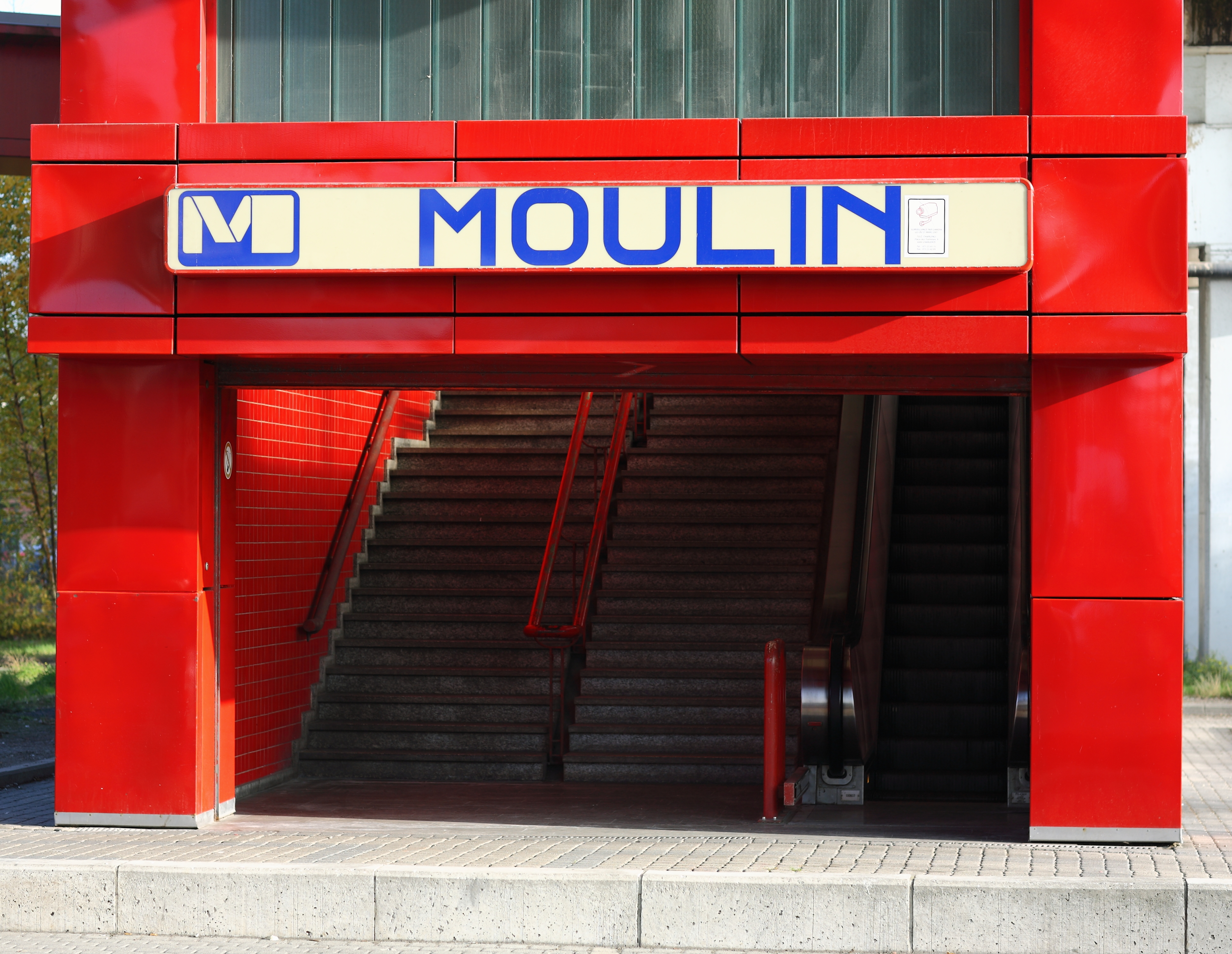

General information
- Coordinates: 50°24′31″N 4°23′14″E
- Transit authority: TEC Charleroi
- Platforms: Central
- Tracks: 2
- Bus routes: 6
- Bus operators: TECCharleroi

Construction
- Platform levels: 1
- Parking: Yes

History
- Opened: 24 August 1992

Services
Preceding station	Charleroi Metro	Following station
Morgnies towards Monument	M1	De Cartier towards Sud
Morgnies towards Monument	M2	De Cartier towards Sud
Location

Moulin (French pronunciation: [mulɛ̃]) is a Charleroi Metro station, located on the border of Marchienne-au-Pont and Monceau-sur-Sambre (both part of the Charleroi municipality), in fare zone 2. The station is built on a viaduct and features a central platform with escalator and stairs access at the western end, leading to two separate street accesses (one on each side of the Rue de Mons).

== Nearby points of interest ==
- Monceau-sur-Sambre castle (French: Château de Monceau) and park.

== Transfers ==
TEC Charleroi bus lines 51, 53, 71, 72, 75, M1ab.
