= Waterloo metro station (Charleroi) =

Charleroi Metro station

Waterloo

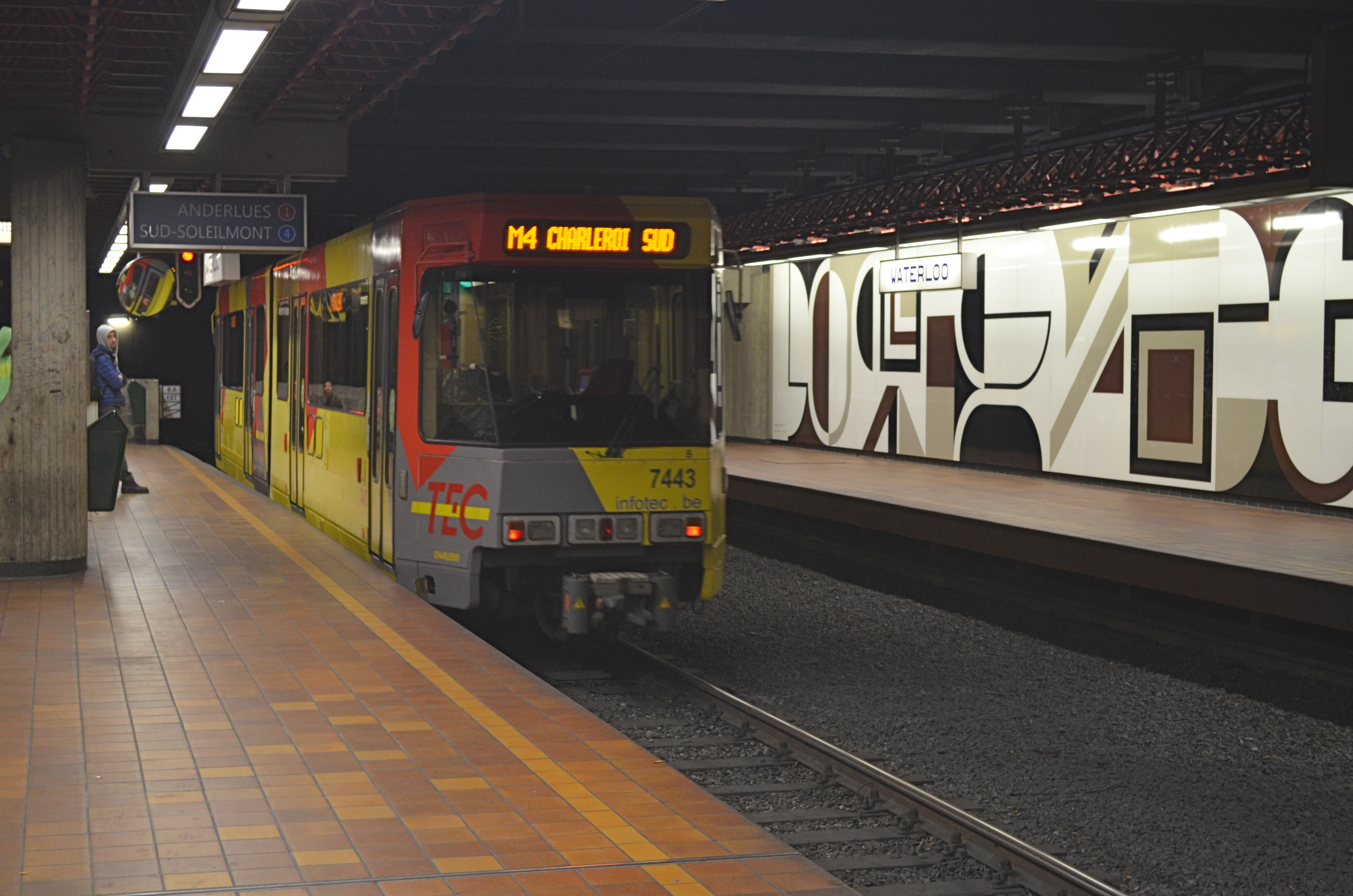
- Vehicle leaving the station. On the wall, an artwork from André Goffin.

General information
- Coordinates: 50°25′03″N 4°27′00″E
- Transit authority: TEC Charleroi
- Platforms: 1 central, 1 lateral (not used)
- Tracks: 2
- Bus routes: 1
- Bus operators: TEC Charleroi

Construction
- Platform levels: 2

History
- Opened: 28 August 1992

Services
Preceding station	Charleroi Metro	Following station
Palais towards Monument	M1	Janson One-way operation
Palais One-way operation	M2	Janson towards Sud
Palais One-way operation	M3	Janson towards Sud
Palais towards Sud	M4	Samaritaine towards Soleilmont
Janson One-way operation	M4	Samaritaine towards Soleilmont
Location

Waterloo (French pronunciation: [watɛʁlo]) is a Charleroi Metro station, located at the northern end of the Belgian city of Charleroi downtown, in fare zone 1.

The station has 3 street entrances (two on each side of the Jules Hénin Avenue, one on the Jules Hiérnaux Square), leading to the lowest level. Platforms are located on the upper level and are accessible through escalators and stairs.

The station has one lateral platform which is currently not used (nor connected to any tram tracks). All current lines use a central platform. Waterloo is also the starting point of the partially built and unused Centenaire line.

Starting from Waterloo is a short track-section running to the North and surfacing north of the Jules Hiérnaux Square, which would have been the starting point of pre-metro lines to Lodelinsart and Gosselies on one side, and Ransart and Heppignies on the other side. (A tram line to Gosselies, beginning at Piges, has been built since.)

The station features an extensive track network, allowing light rail-vehicles to pass the station and reverse the travel direction by entering it from opposite direction (first bypassing it by a passing loop) or by traveling back after departing the station using a passing loop.

On the initial project plan for the Charleroi Pre-metro, the Waterloo station was called Nord (French for "North").

== Nearby points of interest ==
- In the middle of the nearby Jules Hiérnaux Square is a Marsupilami statue which is a well-known Charleroi landmark.
- Notre-Dame (Our Lady) hospital.
- Université du Travail Higher education school.
- Ville 2 Mall

== Transfers ==
TEC Charleroi bus line M4ab after the closure of the metro line.
