= Gilly, Belgium =

Gilly Djilî
- Former municipality of Belgium
- Location in the municipality of Charleroi

- Location in Belgium
- Coordinates: 50°24′N 4°26′E
- Country: Belgium
- Region: Wallonia
- Community: French Community
- Province: Hainaut
- Municipality: Charleroi

Area
  - Total: 2.82 sq mi (7.30 km^{2})

Population (2001)
  - Total: 19,468
- Time zone: UTC+1 (CET)
  - Summer (DST): UTC+2 (CEST)
- Postal code: 6060
- Area code: 071

Gilly (French pronunciation: [ʒili], Walloon: Djilî) is a town of Wallonia and a district of the municipality of Charleroi, located in the province of Hainaut, Belgium.

It was a municipality of its own before the fusion of the Belgian municipalities in 1977.

It houses the base of Fédération des Patros, a youth organisation.

During the 1980s and 1990s it was also the home of an international group of Christian missionaries working with Operation Mobilisation.
