= Anderlues =

Municipality in Hainaut Province, Wallonia, Belgium

Anderlues Anderluwe (Walloon)
- Municipality
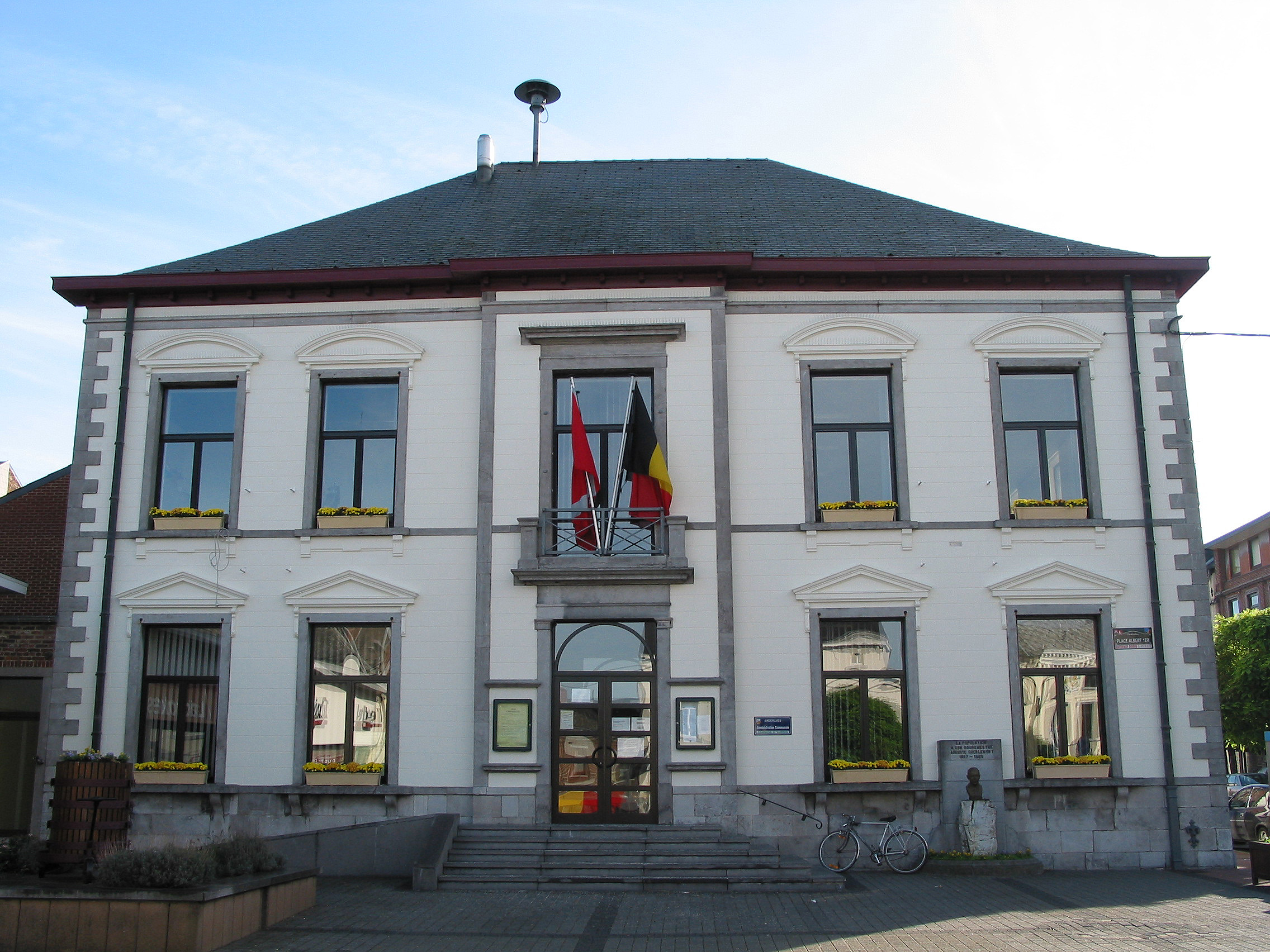
- Anderlues town hall

- Flag Coat of arms

- Location of Anderlues in Hainaut
- Interactive map of Anderlues
- Location in Belgium
- Coordinates: 50°24′N 04°16′E
- Country: Belgium
- Community: French Community
- Region: Wallonia
- Province: Hainaut
- Arrondissement: Thuin

Government
  - Mayor: Philippe Tison (PS)
  - Governing party: PS

Area
  - Total: 17.2 km^{2} (6.6 sq mi)

Population (2026-01-01)
  - Total: 13,107
  - Density: 762/km^{2} (1,970/sq mi)
- Postal codes: 6150
- NIS code: 56001
- Area codes: 071
- Website: www.anderlues.be

Anderlues (French pronunciation: [ɑ̃dɛʁly]; Walloon: Anderluwe; Picard: Andérluve) is a municipality of Wallonia located in the province of Hainaut, Belgium.

On 1 January 2006 Anderlues had a total population of 11,578. The total area is 17.02 square kilometres (6.57 sq mi) which gives a population density of 680 inhabitants per square kilometre. Its postcode is 6150.

On 1 December 1983 a local jewellery store was robbed by the Brabant killers. Some low-value jewels were stolen and two people were killed in what was the gang's last robbery before going silent for one year.
