= Parc metro station (Charleroi) =

Metro station in Charleroi, Belgium

Parc

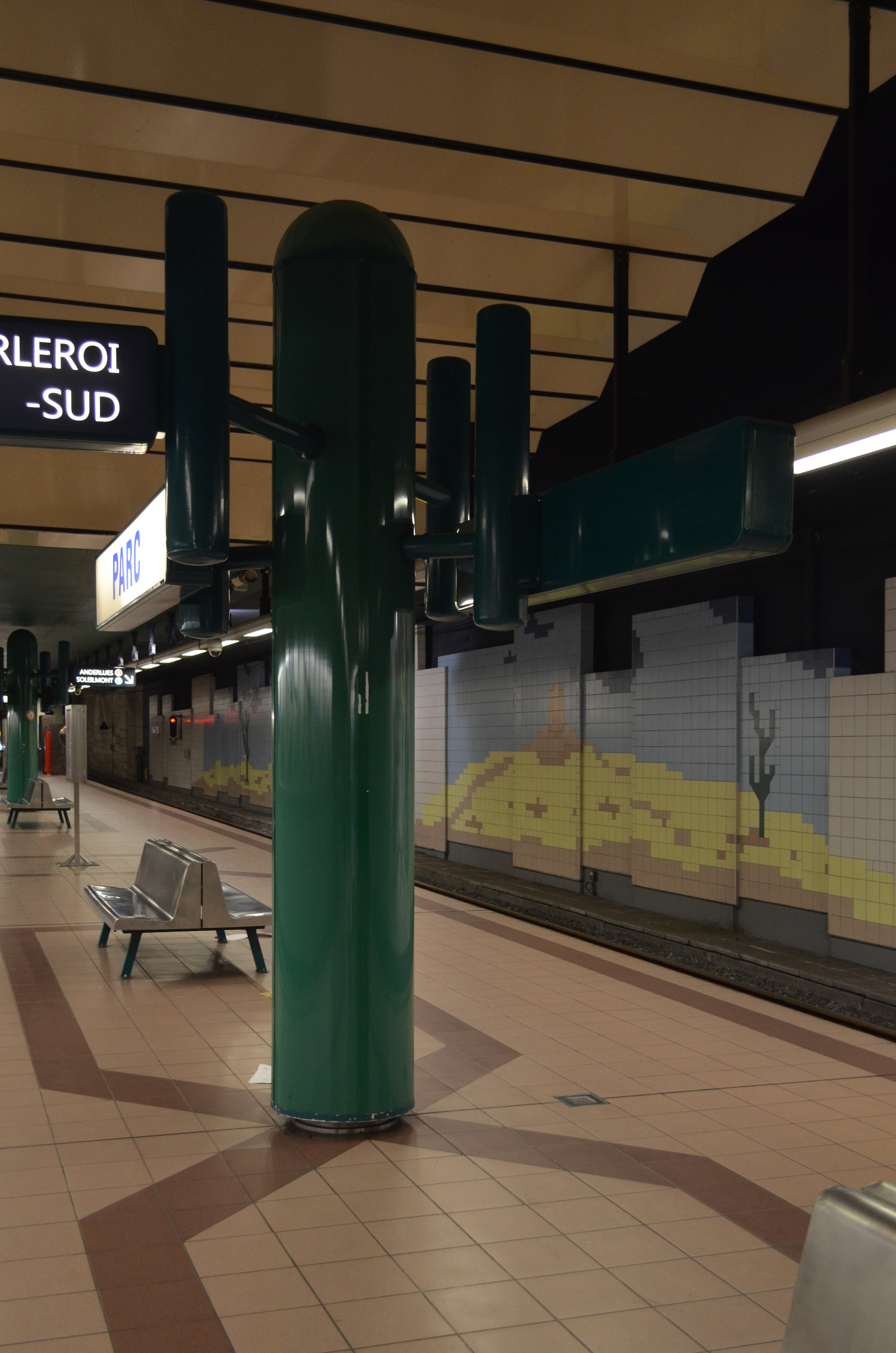

General information
- Coordinates: 50°24′34″N 4°26′55″E
- Transit authority: TEC
- Platforms: Central
- Tracks: 2

Construction
- Platform levels: 1
- Parking: No

History
- Opened: 30 August 1996

Services
Preceding station	Charleroi Metro	Following station
Tirou One-way operation	M1	Janson towards Monument
Tirou towards Monument	M2	Janson One-way operation
Tirou towards Faubourg de Bruxelles	M3	Janson One-way operation
Tirou One-way operation	M4	Janson towards Soleilmont
Location

Parc (French pronunciation: [paʁk]) is a Charleroi Metro station, located in downtown Charleroi, in fare zone 1. It is an underground station with a central platform accessible from the street at both ends.

Interior decoration, themed around the Lucky Luke Belgian comics character, features a fresco of the comics main characters on one side, and a short comics strip depicting a train attack by the Daltons on the other side. There's also a Lucky Luke statue outside of the station, near the park's eastern entrance.

Until 26 February 2012, Parc was the terminus of former lines 55 and 88. Trams would arrive from Janson on the western side of the central platform, then move forward to a turnback siding in a short tunnel section south of the station, before returning to the station for departure on the eastern side of the platform. The turnback now forms part of the Parc to Tirou section.

The station name (French for Park) comes from the adjacent municipal park.

== Nearby points of interest ==
- Queen Astrid municipal park (French: Parc Reine Astrid).
- Charleroi courthouse.
- Schools : Collège du Sacré-Coeur and Athénée Royal Vauban.

== Transfers ==
TEC Charleroi bus lines 1, 3, 18, 25, 35, 71, M1ab, M3ab.

== Photos ==
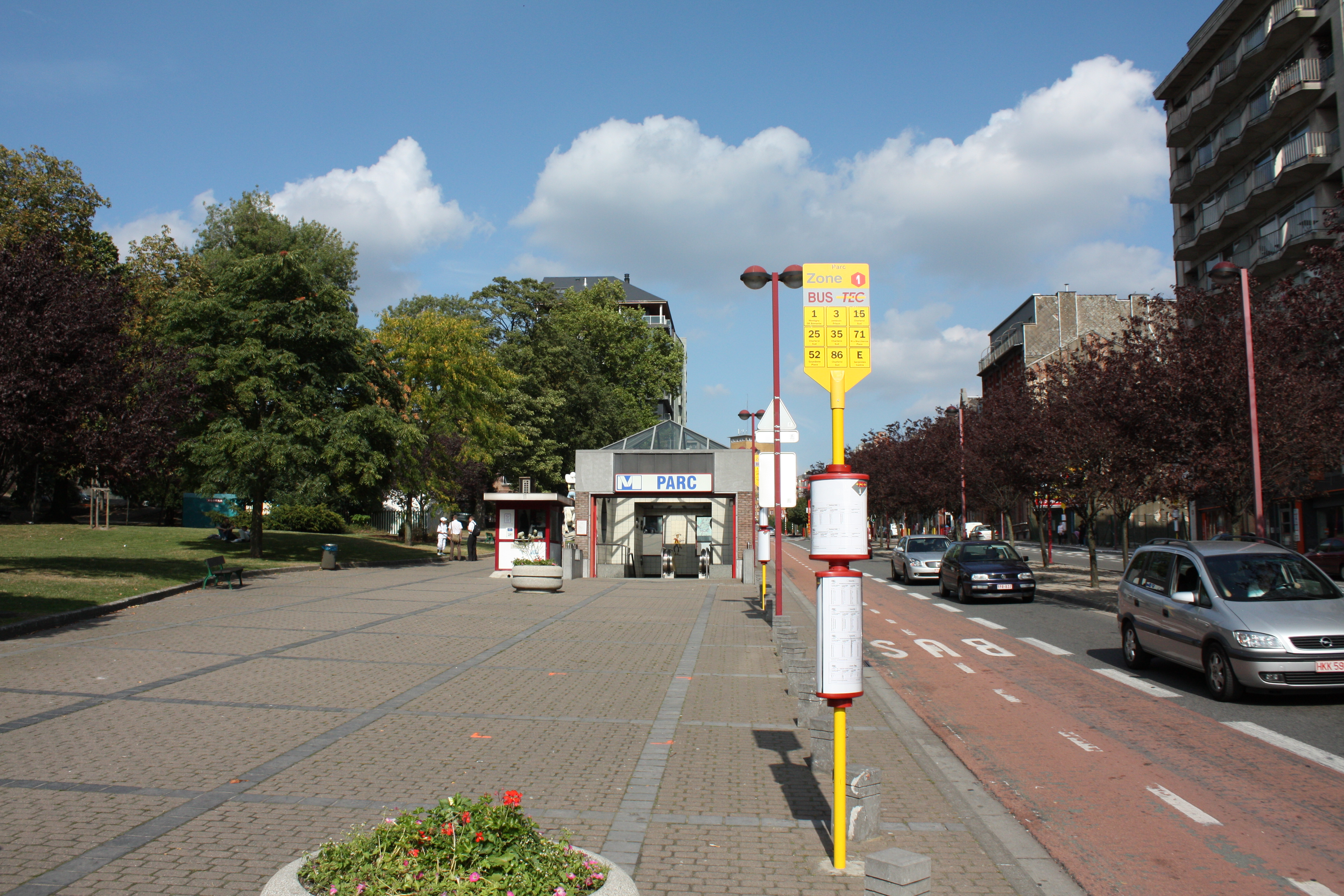
South entrance of the station, with the park on the left.

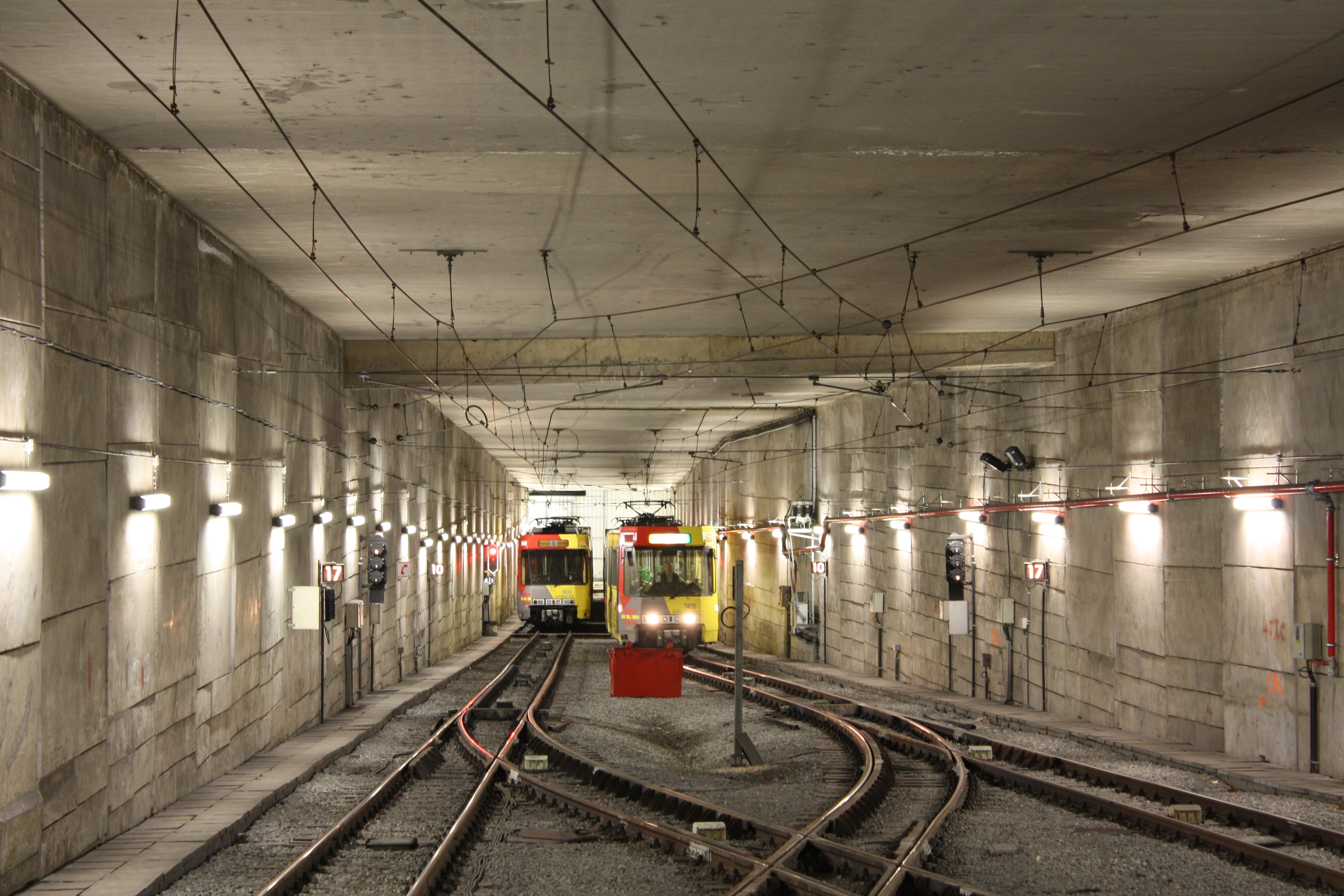
The short tunnel section south of the station where trams park before departure.

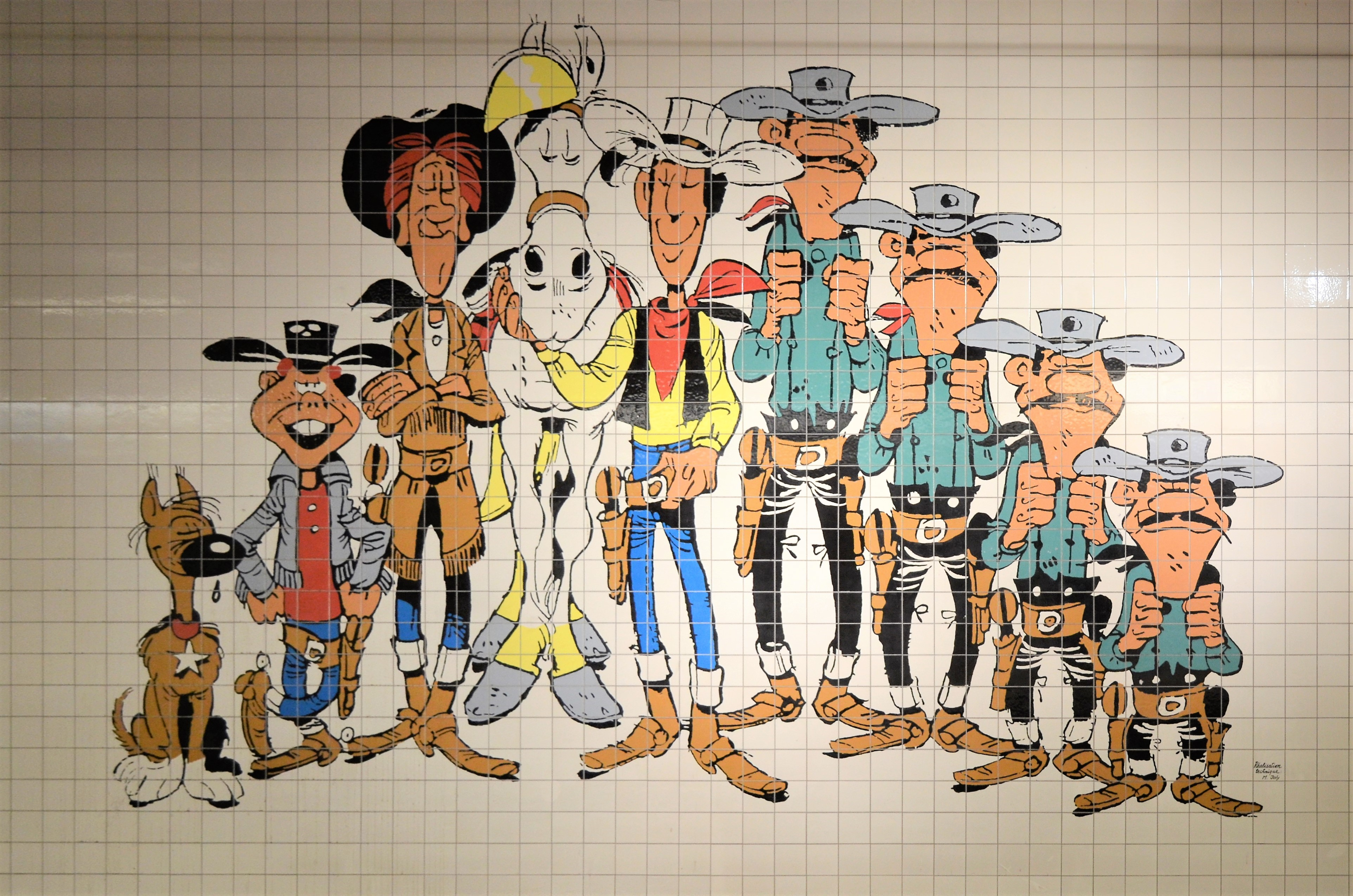
Lucky Luke and other characters from the humorous comics series.
