= Antoine-Félix Bouré =

Belgian sculptor

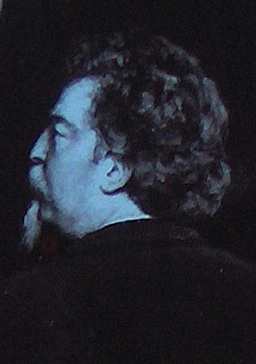
- Detail from group portrait of the Société Libre des Beaux-Arts by Edmond Lambrichs
- Born: 8 July 1831; Brussels
- Died: 8 April 1883 (aged 51); Ixelles
- Known for: sculpture
- Notable work: Gileppe Dam monumental lion L'enfant au lézard Ambiorix · Cicero · Ulpian and portrait busts
- Movement: Realism; Les animaliers

Antoine-Félix Bouré (8 July 1831 – 8 April 1883), known in his own time as Félix Bouré but sometimes found in modern scholarship as Antoine Bouré, was a Belgian sculptor, best known for his monumental lions.

== Life and career ==
Bouré was born in Brussels as the Belgian war of independence was drawing to a close. He studied locally first under Guillaume Geefs and then from 1846 to 1852 under Eugène Simonis at the Royal Academy for Fine Art, going abroad to complete his training at the Academy of Fine Arts at Florence. In his studies, he followed the same course as his older brother, Paul Bouré. Paul died in his mid-twenties when Antoine-Félix was only 17.

Bouré was among the artists whose work was exhibited at the Musée Bovie, a grand maison built by the painter Virginie Bovie on the Rue de Trône, Brussels. In 1868, he was one of sixteen co-founders of the Société Libre des Beaux-Arts, an avant-garde society that provided exhibition space alternative to that of the official Salon in Belgium. The manifesto of the society espoused the Realist principle of "free and individual interpretation of nature" along with avant-gardist ideals of "struggle, change, freedom, progress, originality and tolerance" that were inspired by Courbet and Baudelaire. "Modernity" and "sincerity" were keywords. By 1875 the Salon had come to accept and then coopt the Realist program, at which time the society disbanded.

Bouré was a friend of Auguste Rodin, who worked on a number of projects in Brussels throughout the 1870s. In 1877, Bouré was one of two Belgian sculptors who offered testimony on behalf of the 36-year-old Rodin during a controversy over The Vanquished, a life-sized male nude modeled after a Belgian soldier that was later retitled The Age of Bronze. Rodin had been accused of assembling the work from plaster casts rather than modeling it from life; Bouré confirmed Rodin's work methods from his own observations in the studio.

Bouré's sculptures were considered remarkable for their combination of grace and power. The critic Camille Lemonnier, a fellow member of the Sociéte Libre, praised him for "sincerity", one of the ideals prized by their group. Bouré showed work at the Exposition Universelle de Paris in the years 1867 and 1878, and at numerous salons in Belgium and abroad. He earned medals at exhibitions in Brussels, Paris, and Philadelphia.

Bouré was awarded the Order of Leopold, either as a chevalier (knight) or officier. He died at Ixelles in 1883 in what was marked as the prime of his life, and was buried next to his brother. In L'Art moderne, he was eulogized jointly with the octogenarian Geefs to the detriment of his former teacher, whom the anonymous writer accused of "inundating the country with pathetic vulgarities": Bouré, the writer said, "produced little, but all of it fine." La rue Félix Bouré (or just la rue Bouré) in Ixelles is named for him.

== Animalier ==
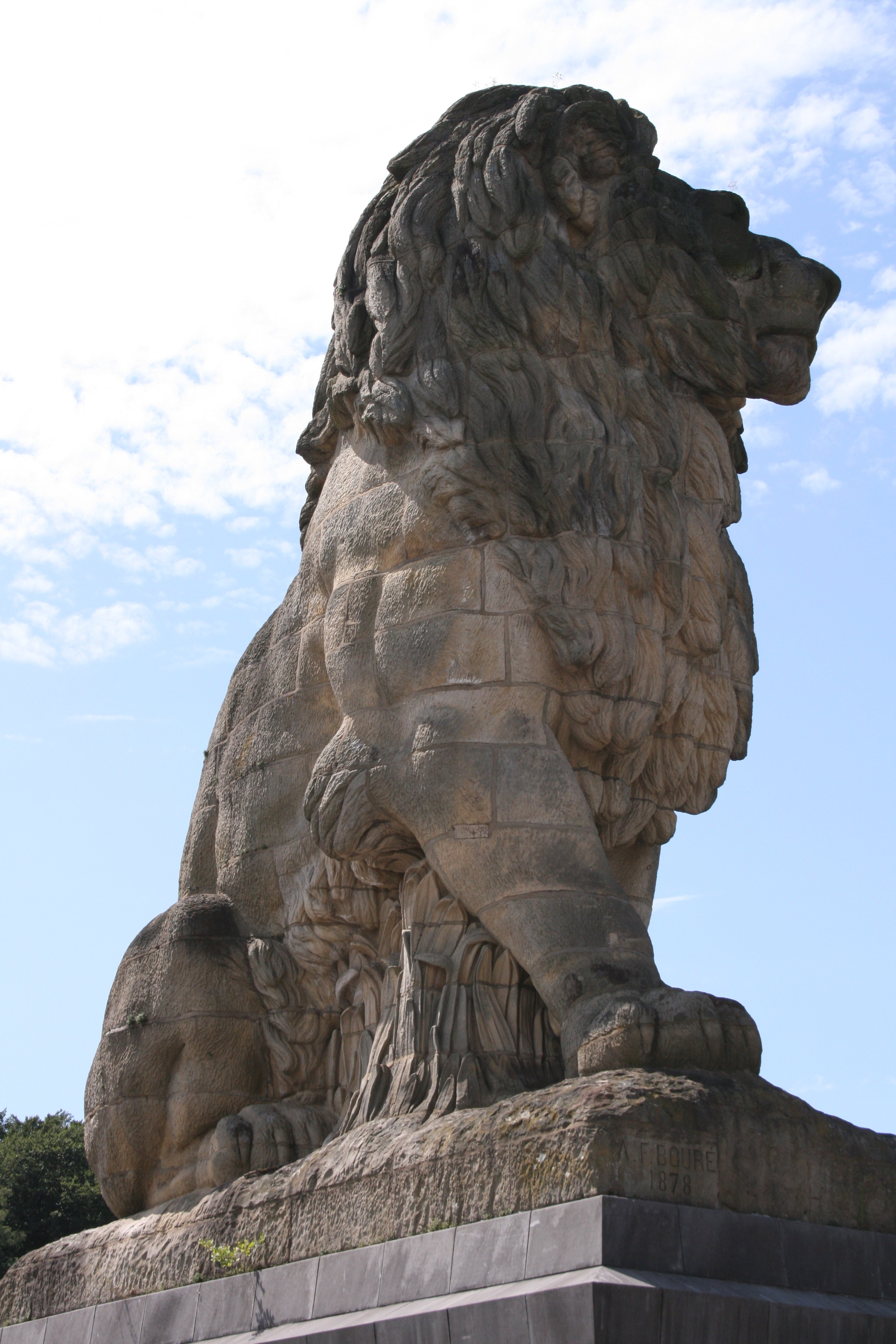
The monumental lion atop the Gileppe Dam

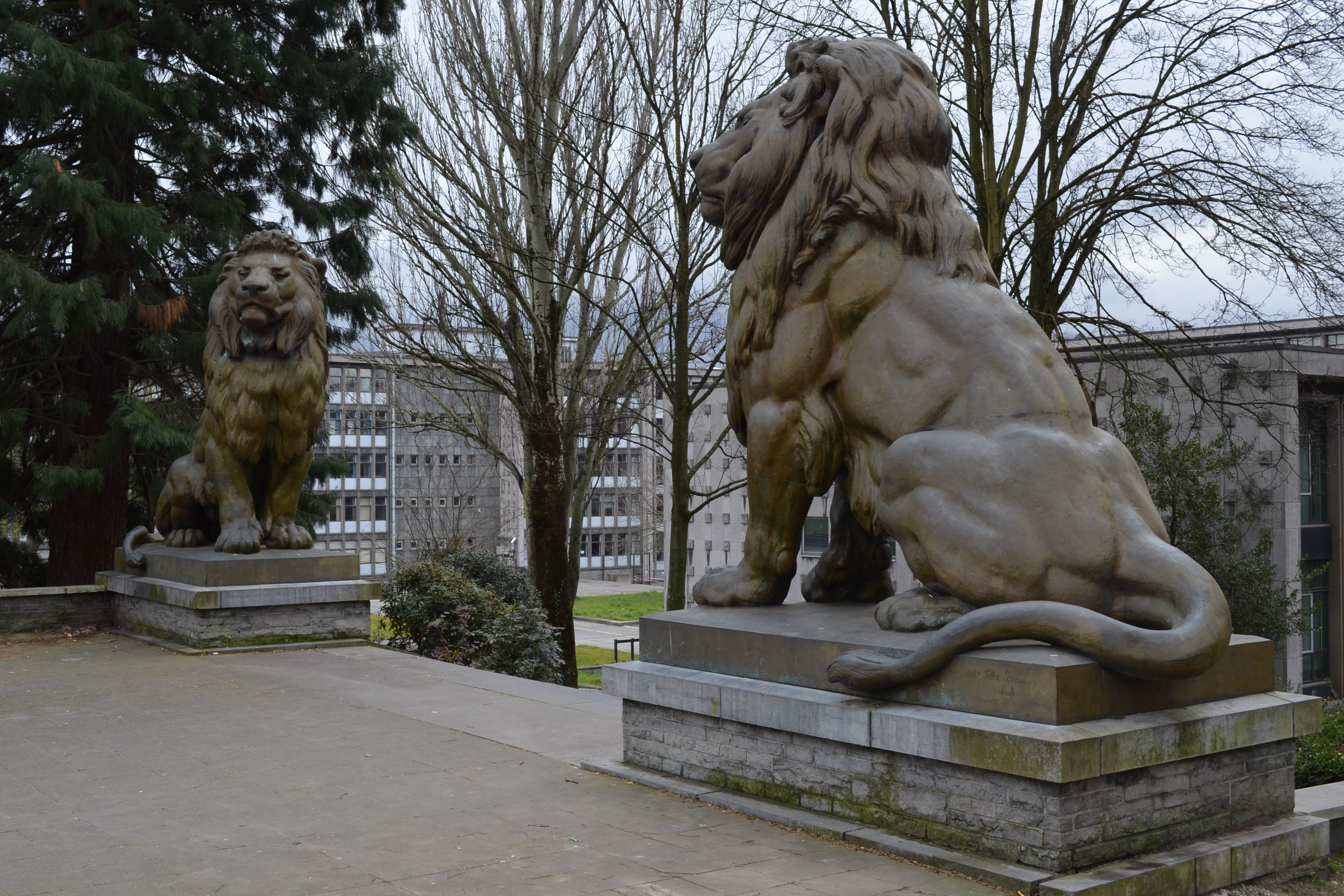
Totor et Tutur at the Palais de Justice in Charleroi

Bouré's reputation rests primarily on his large sculptural lions, characterized by their athletic musculature and majestic air. The most famous of these is the colossal lion that sits atop the Gileppe Dam "like a cat on a garden wall." The Gileppe lion stands 13.5 meters tall (around 44 feet). Weighing 130 tonnes, it was constructed from 183 blocks of sandstone brought to the site by horse-drawn carts.

Bouré also sculpted the colossal lion in bronzed zinc at the Leopold Gate in Brussels; the pair at the entrance to the Palais de Justice in Charleroi, known as Totor et Tutur; and other lions throughout Brussels, including those in the garden of the Palais des Académies and four along the Rue Royale. Some of his lions were produced in tabletop versions.

Bouré's interest in leonine subject matter places him in company with les animaliers, the 19th-century French sculptors led by Antoine-Louis Barye who made animals the focus of their work rather than relegating them to the background. Along with the sculptor Léon Mignon (1847–1898) and Jacques de Lalaing (1858–1917), Bouré helped establish a distinctively Belgian tradition of animal art, to which the flourishing Antwerp Zoo contributed inspiration.

== The Lizard ==
Le lézard by Bouré, juxtaposed with a flipped and rotated image of the Apollo Sauroctonos to show compositional similarities

The other work for which Bouré is most noted shows a strikingly different side of the artist. The white marble Le lézard or L'enfant au lezard, not quite 4 feet long and about 2 feet high (overall 61.5 by 118.5 by 39 cm), depicts a nude boy lying on his stomach, ankles crossed, resting on his left elbow with his right hand cocked inquisitively as he directs his absorbed gaze down at a small lizard. Bouré created this délicieux morceau during the period 1872–1874. It was praised for its fine modeling and lifelike expression, its charm and grace of attitude, and the "rare suppleness of its lines." Le lézard was not uniformly admired. One critic noted its "poverty of imagination" and thinness of execution, while admitting other qualities.

Bouré's child recalls in some aspects the Apollo Sauroctonos ("Apollo the Lizard-Slayer"), an often-reproduced figure in classical antiquity of the pubescent god observing a lizard as it climbs up a tree. The original bronze was attributed to the Athenian sculptor Praxiteles. The Louvre acquired a white marble version in 1807. The sculpture received attention in French-language books on art published while Bouré was active, including Émile Gebhart's Praxitèle (1864) and Wilhelm Fröhner's Notice de la sculpture antique du Musée Impérial du Louvre (1878). If an image of the Sauroctonos is rotated and flipped horizontally, the compositional resemblances with Bouré's L'enfant au lézard become more evident. The Apollo's overall height of nearly 5 feet, which includes the tree trunk extending past the body, gives the figure a vertical proportion comparable to that of Bouré's 4-foot horizontal boy.

The Louvre acquired its Apollo Sauroctonos as part of the Borghese Collection, which included other pieces that may have influenced Bouré such as a boyish standing Eros, the so-called ephebe Narcissus, and a sleeping Hermaphroditus.

Related marbles from the Borghese Collection

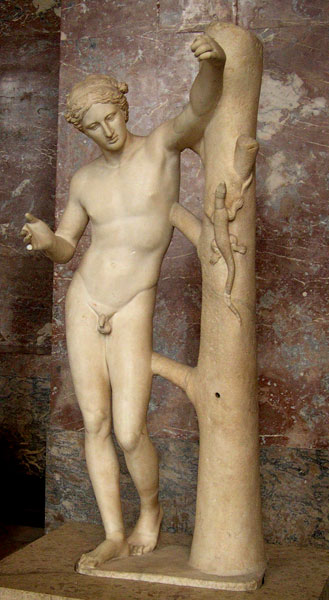
Apollo Sauroctonos

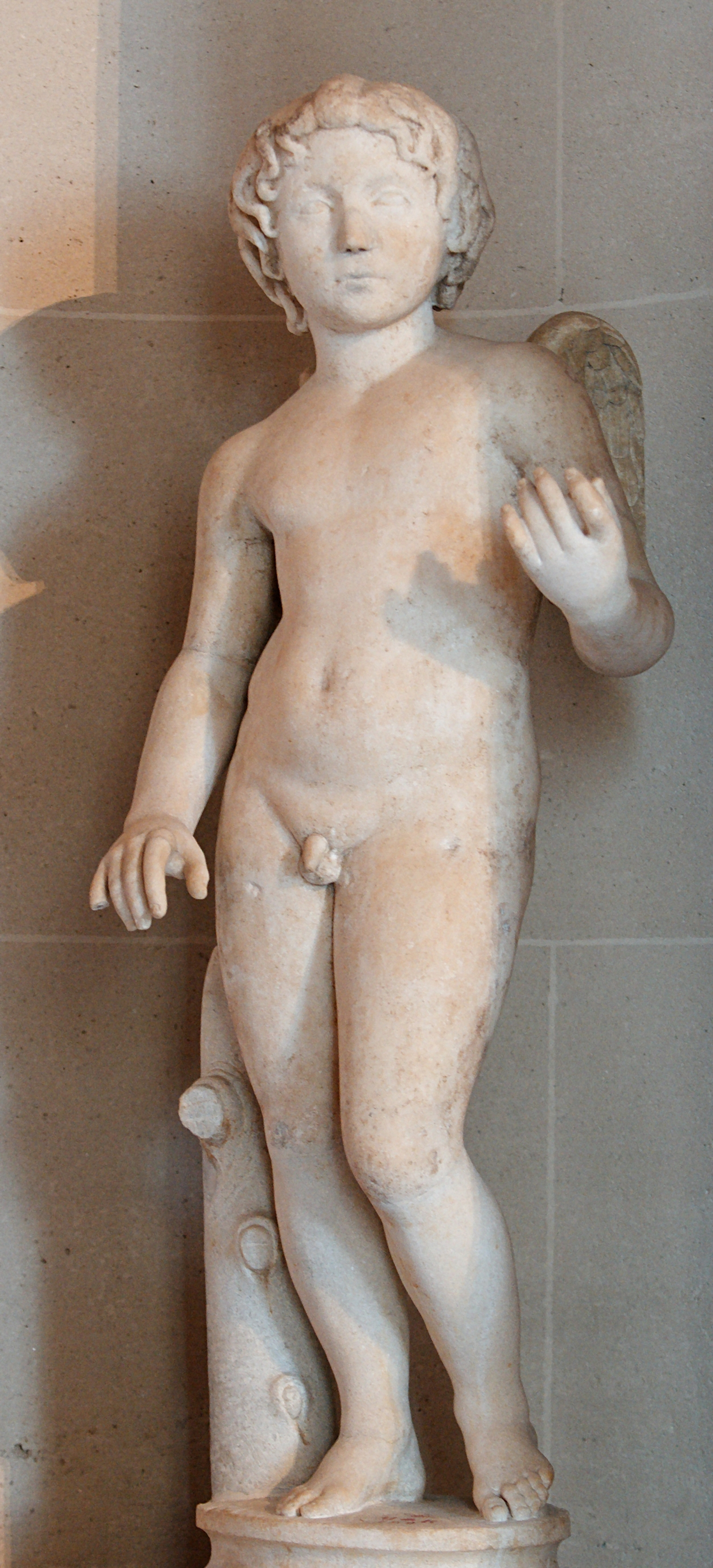
Eros as a boy

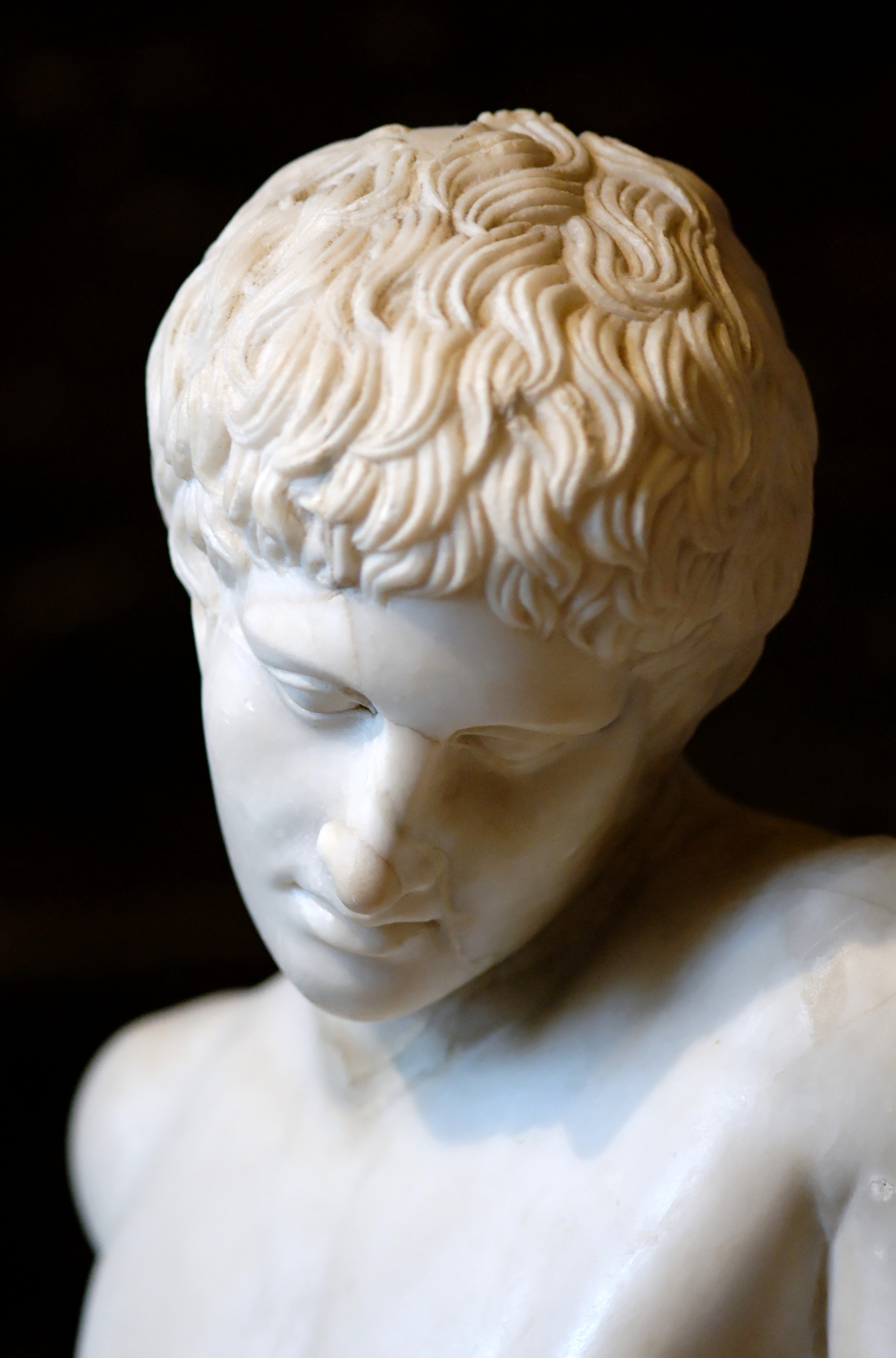
Ephebe Narcissus (detail)

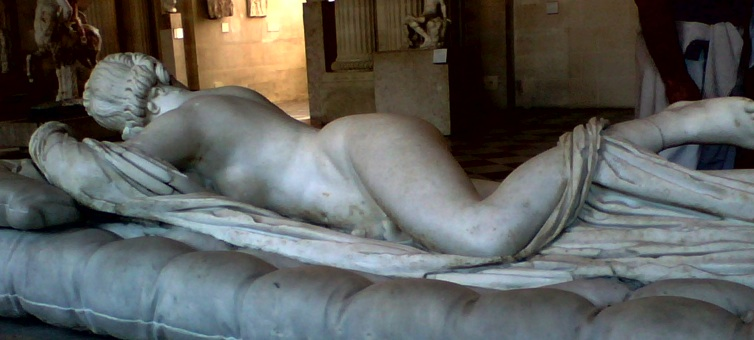
Borghese Hermaphroditus

In classical iconography, a lizard may also appear with Eros, and the Louvre Eros is thought to have originally held a small creature in its hand. Lemonnier pointed to classical qualities in Bouré's work, particularly in relation to ancient Roman sculpture.

Although the subject matter seems out of keeping with Bouré's monumental and public works, his friend Rodin was also sculpting children during his time in Belgium in the 1870s, when Bouré was a visitor to his studio. Several years later, Rodin produced the bronze Les enfants au lézard (Children with a Lizard), depicting a little girl who retreats to her older sister's arms in fear of the small lizard below. Despite a similarity of subject matter, the work bears little resemblance to Bouré's sinuous reclining figure. Rodin's approach to representing children as "well-fed babies" has been related to his practice in drawing cupids (erotes) for various two-dimensional media.

== Historical figures ==
Bouré's Ulpian, Palais de Justice

On the monumental gate of Berchem in Antwerp, Bouré's statue of the Belgo-gallic leader Ambiorix was paired with that of the Nervian general Boduognatus by Pierre Armand Cattier. Their works were brought together again at the Palais de Justice in Brussels, where a pair of Bouré's griffins also preside over the portal. For the interior of the Palais, each artist provided a pair of larger-than-life figures, Cattier the Greek orators Demosthenes and Lycurgus, and Bouré the Roman jurists Cicero and Ulpian. These were among Bouré's last completed works.

== Other works ==
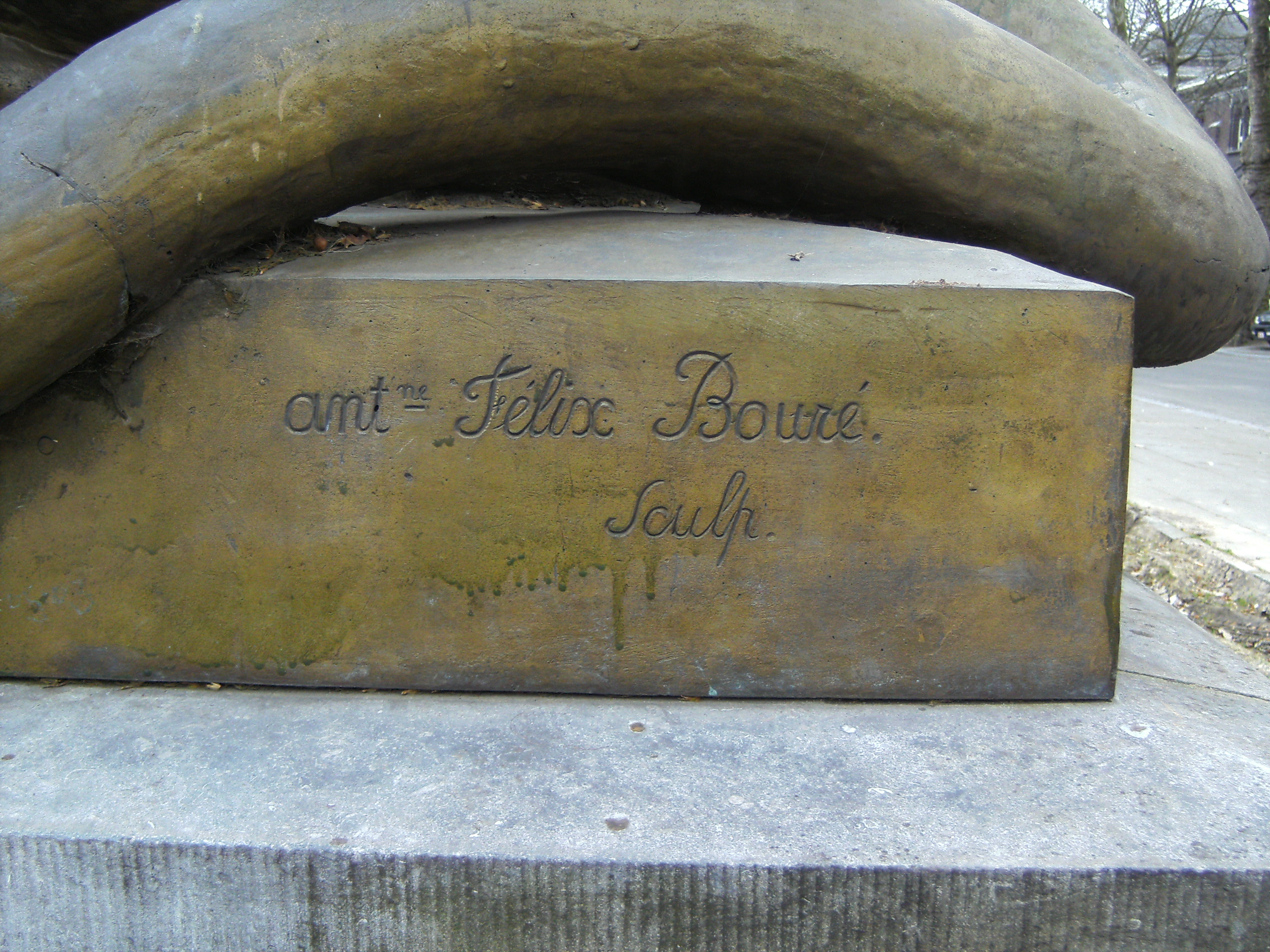
Bouré's signature on the base of one of the lions in the pair Totor et Tutur at Charleroi

Bouré created one of five sculpted pediments for the Royal Conservatory of Brussels. The Génie des Arts ("Genius of the Arts") appears in the center of the five-figure group, with Drama depicted as male to his left and a female Comedy to his right. These are flanked by Dance and Music, or the Muses Terpsichore and Euterpe. Bouré's Freedom of Association (1864) was created for the Chambre des Représentants.

People at the base of Bouré's Gileppe Dam lion show its colossal proportions

Bouré's portrait busts of notable Belgians include Joseph Poelaert, the architect of the Palais de Justice; the surgeon and iodotherapist Limange; and Jean van Ruysbroeck, the architect of the Hôtel de ville de Bruxelles. Bouré created a self-portrait for his own tomb, and at the time of his death was working on a bronze bust of the 16th-century architect Cornelis Floris de Vriendt which was completed by Joseph van Rasbourgh. Lemonnier compared the bust of Limange, with a face "seamed by wrinkles and worked with Socratic embossing," to the portraiture of antiquity.
