= Jacques de Lalaing (artist) =

Anglo-Belgian painter and sculptor

- Born: Jacques de Lalaing c. 1858; London, U.K.
- Died: c. 1917
- Education: Académie Royale des Beaux-Arts of Brussels
- Occupation: Painter

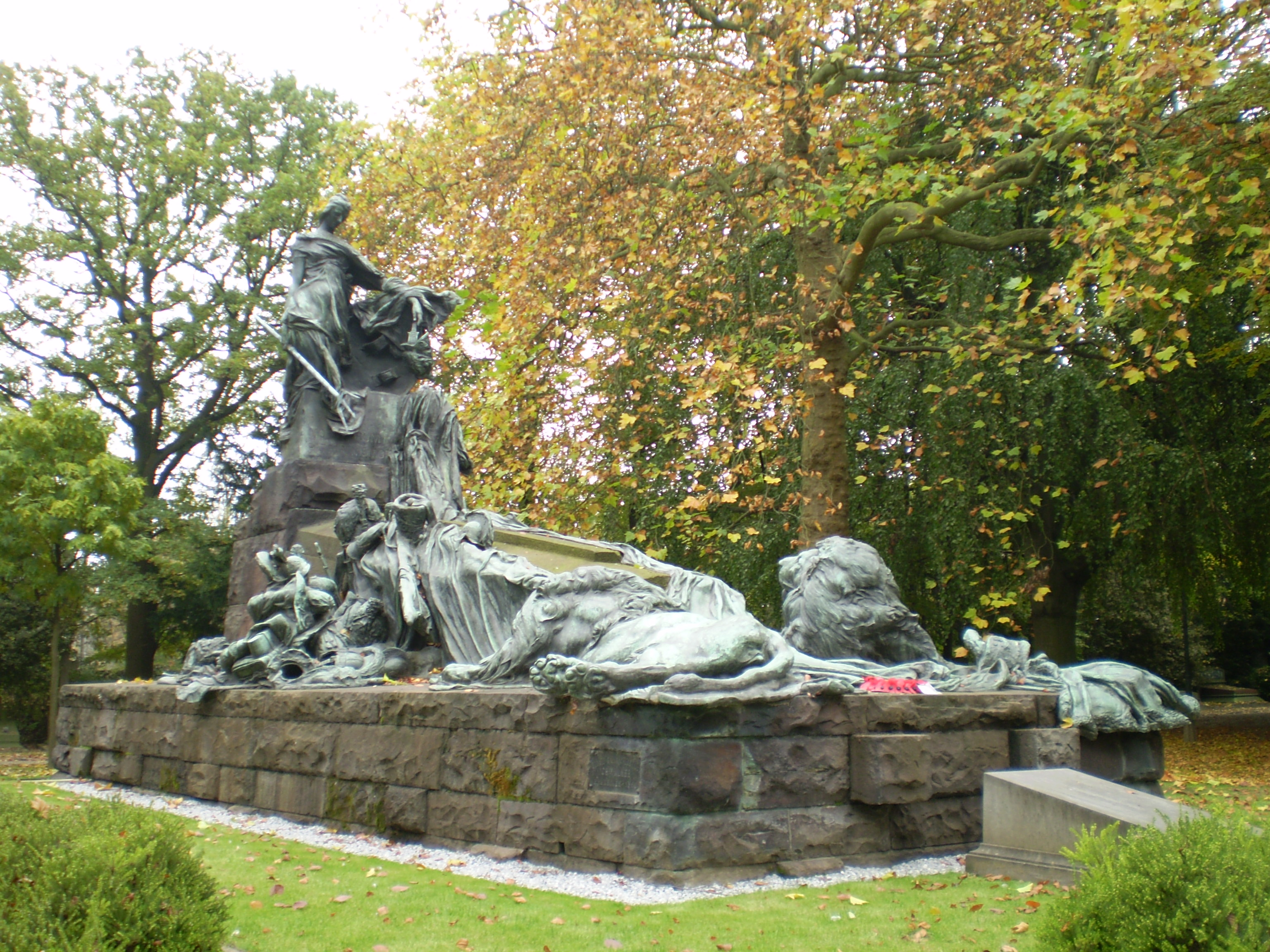
Waterloo Memorial, Brussels Cemetery

Jacques de Lalaing (1858–1917) was an Anglo-Belgian painter and sculptor, specializing in animals.

== Life ==
Jacques was born in London in one of the oldest noble families of Belgium. He was the son of Count Maximilien IV de Lalaing (1811–1881). His brother was Charles Maximilien de Lalaing (1857–1919), who was an important diplomat.

Lalaing was raised in England until 1875, when he moved to Brussels. He trained as an artist under Jean-François Portaels and Louis Gallait at the Académie Royale des Beaux-Arts in Brussels, showing first as a painter with the group L'Essor.

With the encouragement of Thomas Vinçotte and Jef Lambeaux, Lalaing began to sculpt in 1884. As a painter he continued to work in a realistic, naturalistic style, as a portrait painter and producing historical scenes. As a sculptor he produced allegorical bronzes and memorial art. Along with his fellow animalier sculptors Léon Mignon (1847–1898) and Antoine-Félix Bouré (1831–1883), Lalaing established a distinctively Belgian tradition of animal art, to which the flourishing Antwerp Zoo contributed inspiration.

In 1896 Lalaing became a member of the Royal Academy where he had studied, and from 1904 through 1913 he served as its director. His works are represented in the collections of museums in Antwerp, Bruges, Brussels, Ghent and Tournai.

== Works ==
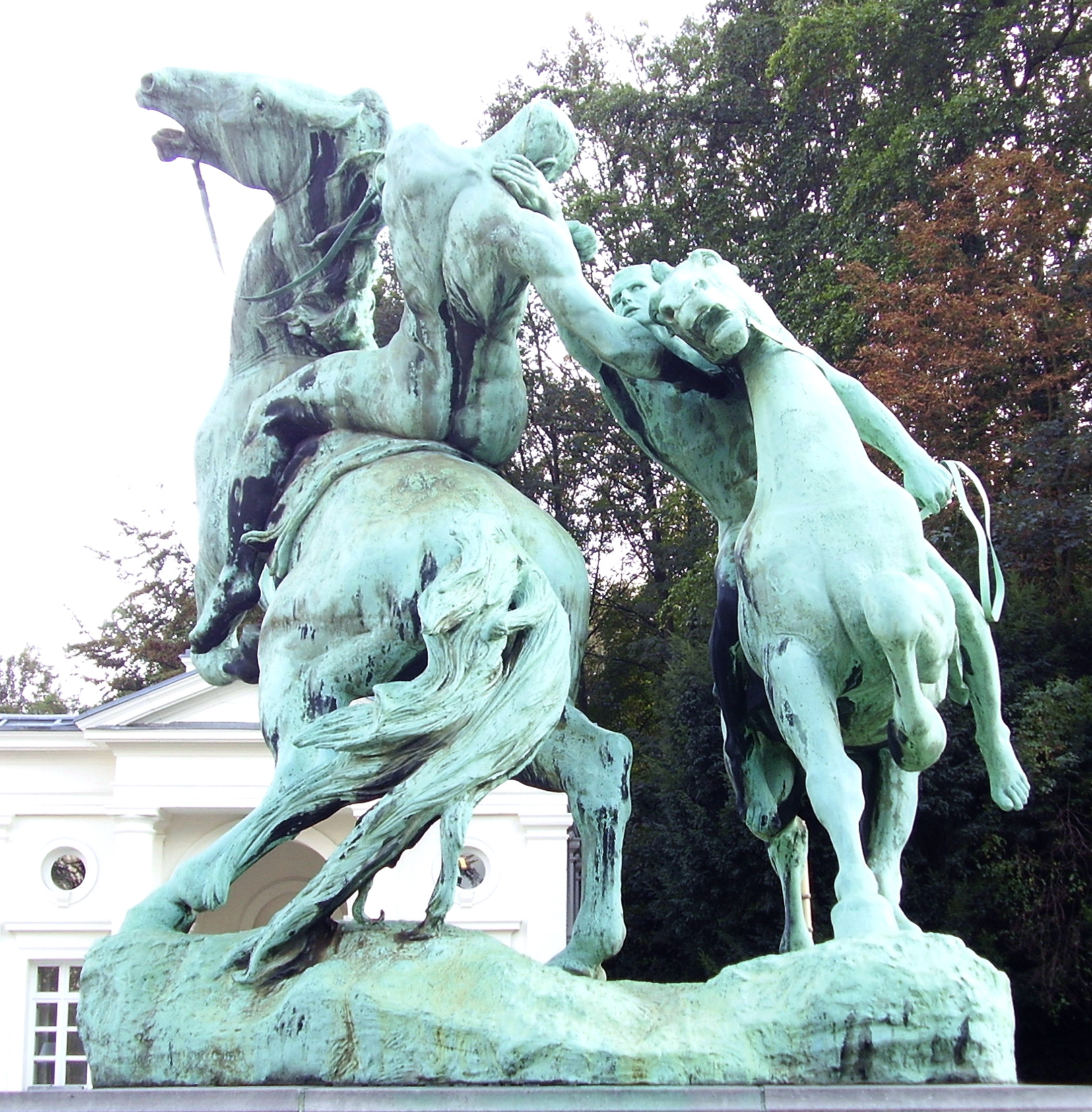
Battle of Horsemen bronze, Bois de la Cambre, Brussels

- The equestrian bronze of Leopold I of Belgium in Ostend
- The horseman battle bronze group at the entrance of the Bois de la Cambre, Brussels
- memorial to British soldiers in the Battle of Waterloo, Brussels Cemetery, Brussels, 1890
- 22-meter bronze pylon at the corner of Louis-Bertrand Avenue and Deschanel in Schaerbeek, originally made for the Ghent Exposition in 1913
- A group of three bronzes representing the Three Ages of Man, Square Ambiorix, Brussels
- interior work at the Hotel de Ville of Saint-Gilles, including allegorical figures of Education and Justice

=== Bibliography ===
- Max Waller, Le salon de Brussels - 1884, Brussels, 1884.
- Jules Du Jardin, Les artistes contemporains, Brussels, 1900.
- Albert Van Dievoet, « La participation des Belges à l'exposition quatriennale à Munich », dans : L'Expansion Belge, VII, août 1909, p. 485.
- Francis Vurgey, « À l'atelier de Lalaing », dans La Fédération Artistique, Brussels, 6 décembre 1903.
- P. Lambotte, Le comte Jacques de Lalaing, peintre et sculpteur, 1858–1917, Anvers, 1918.
- Charles Conrardy, La sculpture belge au XIXe siècle, Brussels, 1947.
- Jean Portaels et ses élèves, catalogue d'exposition, Brussels, Musées royaux, 1979.
- Gérald Schurr, 1820-1920, les petits maîtres de la peinture: valeur de demain, Paris, Éditions de l'Amateur, 1979.
- Hugo Lettens, Raymond Petiau, Hubert Verbruggen, Véronique Cnudde et Richard Kerremans, Le mât électrique : Jacques de Lalaing, 1858–1917, Schaerbeek, 1993, 133 p.
- Jacques van Lennep et Catherine Leclercq, Les sculptures de Bruxelles, Anvers et Brussels, 2000.
- Catherine Leclercq, Jacques de Lalaing : artiste et homme du monde (1858–1917), avec de larges extraits de son journal, Brussels, Académie royale de Belgique, 2006, 443 p. ISBN 2-8031-0232-3.
- L'art au Sénat : découverte d'un patrimoine, Brussels : éditions Racine, 2006 ISBN 978-90-209-6880-4 .
- Hugh Robert Boudin, « de Lalaing, Jacques », in : Dictionnaire historique du protestantisme et de l'anglicanisme en Belgique du 16e siècle à nos jours, Arquennes, 2014 ISBN 978-2-930698-06-9.
- Alain Jacobs, https://collections.heritage.brussels/fr/objects/43895 https://collections.heritage.brussels/fr/objects/42762https://collections.heritage.brussels/fr/objects/43885https://collections.heritage.brussels/fr/objects/43914
