= Virginie Bovie =

Belgian painter

- Born: Virginie Bovie ca. 1821; Brussels, Belgium
- Died: ca. 1888

Virginie Bovie (1821–1888), full name Joséphine-Louise-Virginie Bovie, was a Belgian painter and arts patron. In 1870, she was described as "well known", but she has fallen into neglect in the 20th and early 21st centuries and only seven of her more than 200 works have been located.

== Life and career ==
Bovie was born in Brussels and studied drawing first under Frans-Karel Deweirdt (1799–1855) before becoming part of the painting atelier of Antoine Wiertz (1806–1865), whose "megalomanic conceptions" she is said to have picked up. From 1850 forward, she regularly exhibited her works at the annual salons of Brussels, Antwerp, and Ghent. These were historical and allegorical scenes, portraits or genre pieces. By the time she was 30, Bovie had executed two large-scale paintings for her parish church.

She began a tour of Italy in 1855 with her older sister, Louise Bovie, a writer whose collected stories were published posthumously in 1870. Of the 300 Belgian painters, sculptors, engravers, and architects who traveled to Italy to study during the period 1830–1914, only five are thought to have been women; Bovie is one of three whose presence there is attested with certainty. She visited Rome, Florence, Naples, and Venice, obtaining permission to copy paintings in the galleries of Florence as she did later in Paris at the Louvre, where in 1858 she reproduced The Raft of the Medusa by Théodore Géricault. Bovie painted several works on canvas drawing on Italian subject matter, including Neapolitan Woman with Child (1857), and exhibited some of these at the 1866 salon in Brussels and the 1879 salon in Antwerp.

Her father was a rentier capitalist, and Bovie was able to remain financially independent and unmarried throughout her life. She lived in Saint-Josse-ten-Noode and Ixelles, suburbs of Brussels that were favored by artists. She built a grand maison at 208 rue de Trône, Ixelles, and had Musée Bovie carved into one of the foundation stones. She lived there for many years with Louise, who also never married, and used the house as exhibition space. Her cousin Félix Bovie, a painter, and the sculptor Antoine-Félix Bouré also showed their works there. In an 1873 English-language guide describing a six-day walking tour of Brussels, the Musée Bovie was noted as near the Musée Wiertz.

Bovie persisted with history painting at a time when it had become unfashionable, but her subject matter shows great variety. Her economic and personal independence enabled her to focus her energies on her career as a painter. The art historian Anne-Marie ten Bokum has conjectured that Bovie was a lesbian.

Virginie and Louise had a third sister, Hortence or Hortense, who married François-Joachim-Alexandre Rouen and appears to have outlived him and both her sisters.

Upon Bovie's death, the state declined the bequest of her musée and allowed its contents to be auctioned off. A catalogue for the auction, held in February 1889, was compiled by Jules de Brauwere.

== Work ==
The auction catalogue for the estate lists 170 works of art by Bovie, in addition to 71 she had collected. She is thought to have produced at least 204 works, an unusually high figure for a woman at the time, but as of 2005, only seven could be located. In addition to her grand historical and religious paintings, some of which were official commissions, her diverse oeuvre includes scenes of contemporary life, floral arrangements, and portraits. Unlike the large-scale paintings, the genre works appeal to a bourgeois sensibility and permit a female perspective.

In the first decade of the 21st century, The Crucifixion and Descent from the Cross were still on view at the Église Saints-Jean-et-Nicolas at Schaerbeek in Brussels. These early paintings show the influence of Wiertz and masters of the Flemish Baroque such as Rubens and de Crayer.

Bovie exhibited The Visitation and The Iconoclasts at the Cathedral of Antwerp at the Antwerp salon of 1861. A reviewer remarked:

They show evidence of substantial studies, a good grasp of composition, great feeling for color—all qualities which are grounds for astonishment in a woman and in a century when painting shines with more grace than power.

Through her observation of Venetian masterworks, her use of color gained warmth and luminosity. During the last decade of her life, she gradually renounced the academic tradition of painting and her style became freer.

Other known works are the Neapolitan Woman with Child (1857), among those inspired by her travels in Italy; L'affranchissement de l'Escaut (1863), a drawing in black chalk (pierre noire) and sanguine that came to auction in Belgium in 2009; and a self portrait (1872).

== Selected bibliography ==
- P. & V. Berko, "Dictionary of Belgian painters born between 1750 & 1875", Knokke 1981, p. 70.
- Virginie Bovie in Dictionnaire des femmes belges: XIXe et XXe siècles (Éditions Racine, 2006), with a black-and-while reproduction of her self-portrait
- Anne-Marie ten Bokum, "Virginie Bovie, een vergeten Brusselse schilderes," Art&fact 24: Femmes et créations (2005) (in French)
