= Paul Bouré =

Belgian artist

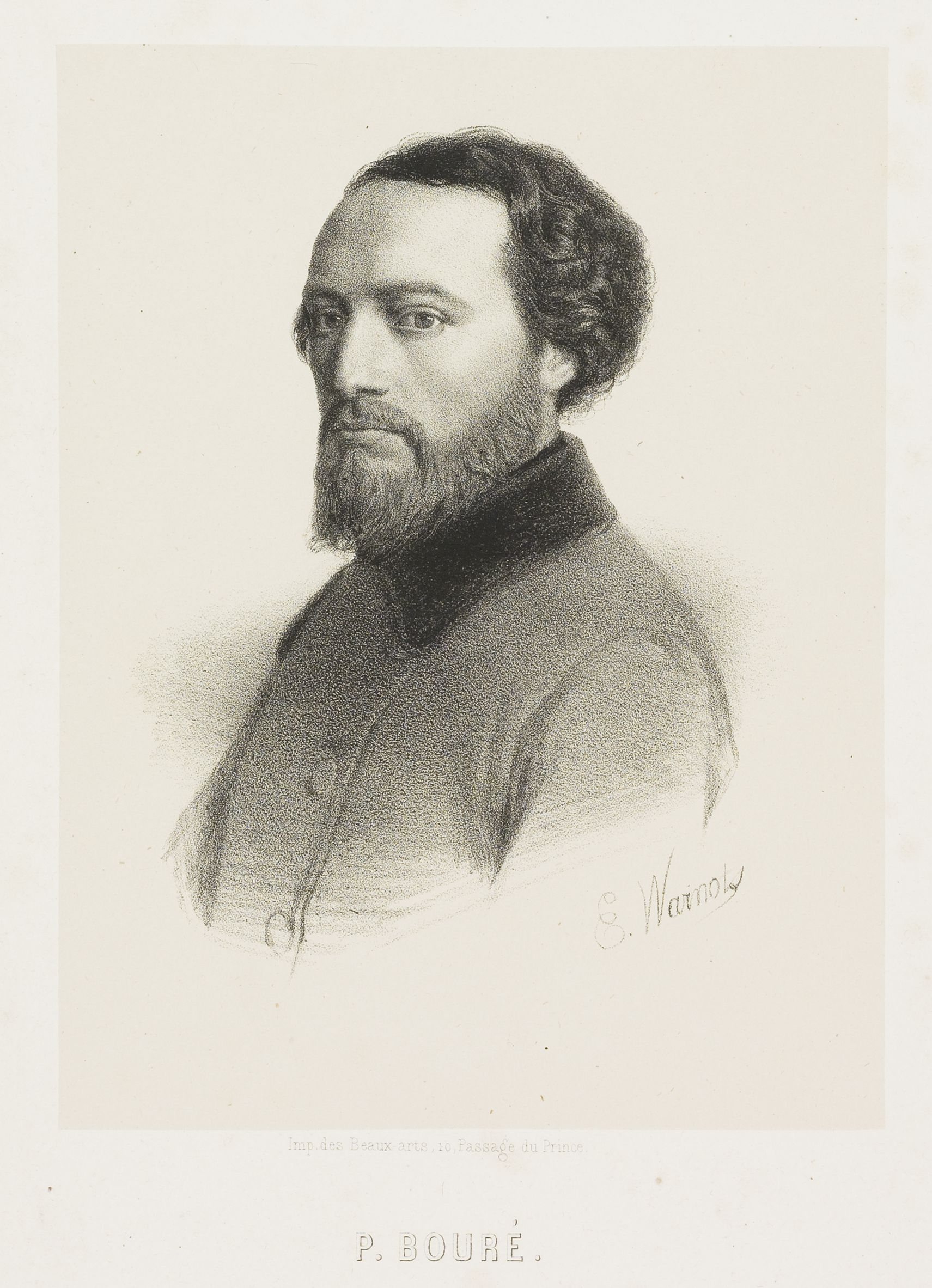
Paul Bouré

Paul Bouré or Paul-Joseph Bouré (2 July 1823 – 17 December 1848) was a Belgian artist. Poised to become one of the most notable sculptors of his time, he died at the age of 25.

== Education and career ==
Bouré studied at the Académie Royale des Beaux-Arts from 1837 to 1841, first under Guillaume Geefs in 1838 and then with Eugène Simonis. In October 1841, he traveled to Italy and visited Rome, Florence and Pisa.

His teacher Simonis wrote to him in 1842 on the value of studying in Florence:

You can also, and perhaps more easily than in the Eternal City, compare the ancient plaster casts that you have obtained for study with the marble originals, and in this manner convince yourself of the absurdity of the great number of critics who only judge ancient sculptors on the basis of bad plaster casts that came into their range of vision by sheer chance.

He began studies in 1842 at the workshop of Emilio Santarelli (1801–1886), rather than at the Florence academy, and earned the attention of Lorenzo Bartolini, who was struck by his precocious talent. He remained in Florence until 1844.

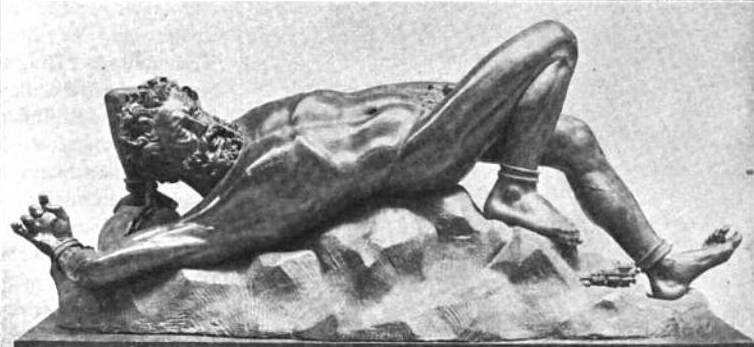
Prometheus Chained on Mount Caucasus (1845) by Paul Bouré

Bouré returned to Belgium in 1844 and began to exhibit his works. The Italian sculptor Carlo Finelli praised his Meditating Love (1844), and his Young Faun Reclining (1843) was also much admired. Bouré's version of Prometheus Bound, called an "erudite and impressive creation," was later remembered as the most remarkable work at the Brussels exhibition of 1845. At the time, however, a reviewer characterized the work as an entirely physical treatment of the myth, admittedly modeled "with an astonishing power and vigor," but failing to capture what was then a common view of Prometheus as a Christ-like figure symbolizing the struggle of doomed human intelligence. Bouré himself was hailed as "on the way to becoming a truly distinguished artist."

In 1848, Bouré showed Enfant jouant aux billes (Child Playing with Balls) and Sauvage surpris par un serpent (Savage Surprised by a Snake), earning the gold medal. The latter work in particular locates the artist at the intersection of classicism and Romanticism. Its serpentine struggle between human and animal has been compared to the Laocoön theme in sculpture. Bouré departs from the classical heroic conception by portraying his human subject as "without hope, already defeated, strangled and trapped, deprived of any possibility of fighting for liberty."

Bouré also created sculpture for the façade of the Brussels Town Hall.

Toward the end of his life, Bouré withdrew to Olloy-sur-Viroin, a small town near Namur, where his maternal grandmother lived. There he took up painting. Although his paintings are not well known, a self-portrait is mentioned in the catalogue of a retrospective exhibition in 1905. Shortly before his death, Bouré managed to complete a group of eight figures that had been commissioned for the Brussels Town Hall: Philip the Good, Charles the Bold, Mary of Burgundy, Maximilian I, Philip I of Castile, Charles V, Margaret of Parma, Philip II of Spain. His last two works, of Christ and the Virgin, were destined for the church at Olloy. At his father's request, the plaster casts of his statues were given to the Belgian government.

His younger brother Antoine-Félix Bouré (1831–1883) was also a sculptor, known for his monumental lions and his statue of the Gallic leader Ambiorix on the monumental gate of Berchem in Antwerp.

== Sources ==
- "Bouré, Paul Joseph," Belgian Art Links and Tools, Kunstenaarsbiografie
- Edmond Marchal, La sculpture et les chefs-d'œuvre de l'orfèvrerie belges (Brussels, 1895), pp. 695–696 online.
- Royal Museums of Fine Arts of Belgium, Fabritius online catalogue, several examples of Bouré's sculptures with images
