= Charleroi Courthouse =

Courthouse in Charleroi, Belgium

- Palais de justice de Charleroi
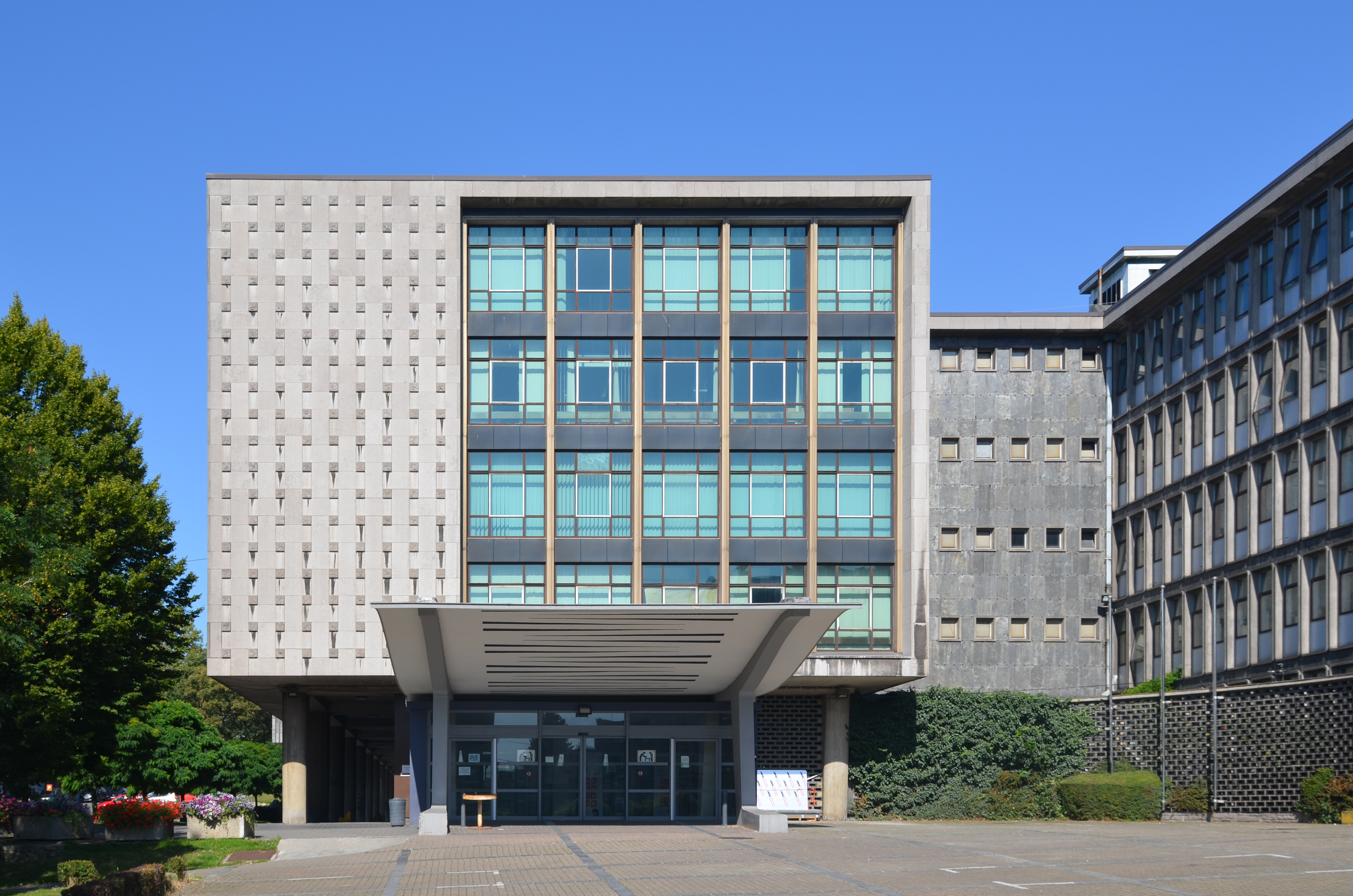
- The entrance to the courthouse in August 2019
- Location: Avenue Général Michel
- Designer: Jacques Depelsenaire, Simon Brigode
- Type: Courthouse
- Beginning date: 1954-1969

The Charleroi Courthouse is located on Avenue Général Michel in Charleroi, Belgium.

Built between 1959 and 1963, according to Charleroi architect Jacques Depelsenaire, it is the fourth building since the early 19th century to house the Charleroi judiciary.

Today, it houses the Hainaut Court of First Instance, Charleroi Division, the Charleroi public prosecutor's office, the justices of the peace of Charleroi I and II, and the police court, Charleroi Division.

On the same land, there is a building where the National Glass Institute, the Glass Museum, and the Archaeological Museum were housed from 1967 to 2006. Since 2010, the building has been occupied by the company court (until 2018 "commercial court"), the labor court, and the labor prosecutor's office.

== Location ==
The Palace of Justice and its extension, the Palais du verre, or The Glass Palace of Charleroi, are located on the former Maneuver Plain and used for the training of soldiers from the Caporal Trésignies barracks located on the other side of Avenue Général Michel. This rectangular plot of land is surrounded, in addition to Avenue Général Michel to the east, by street Émile Tumelaire to the south, boulevard Alfred de Fontaine to the west, and boulevard Paul Janson to the north. Since 2015, the site has been named Jacques Depelsenaire Park.

== History ==
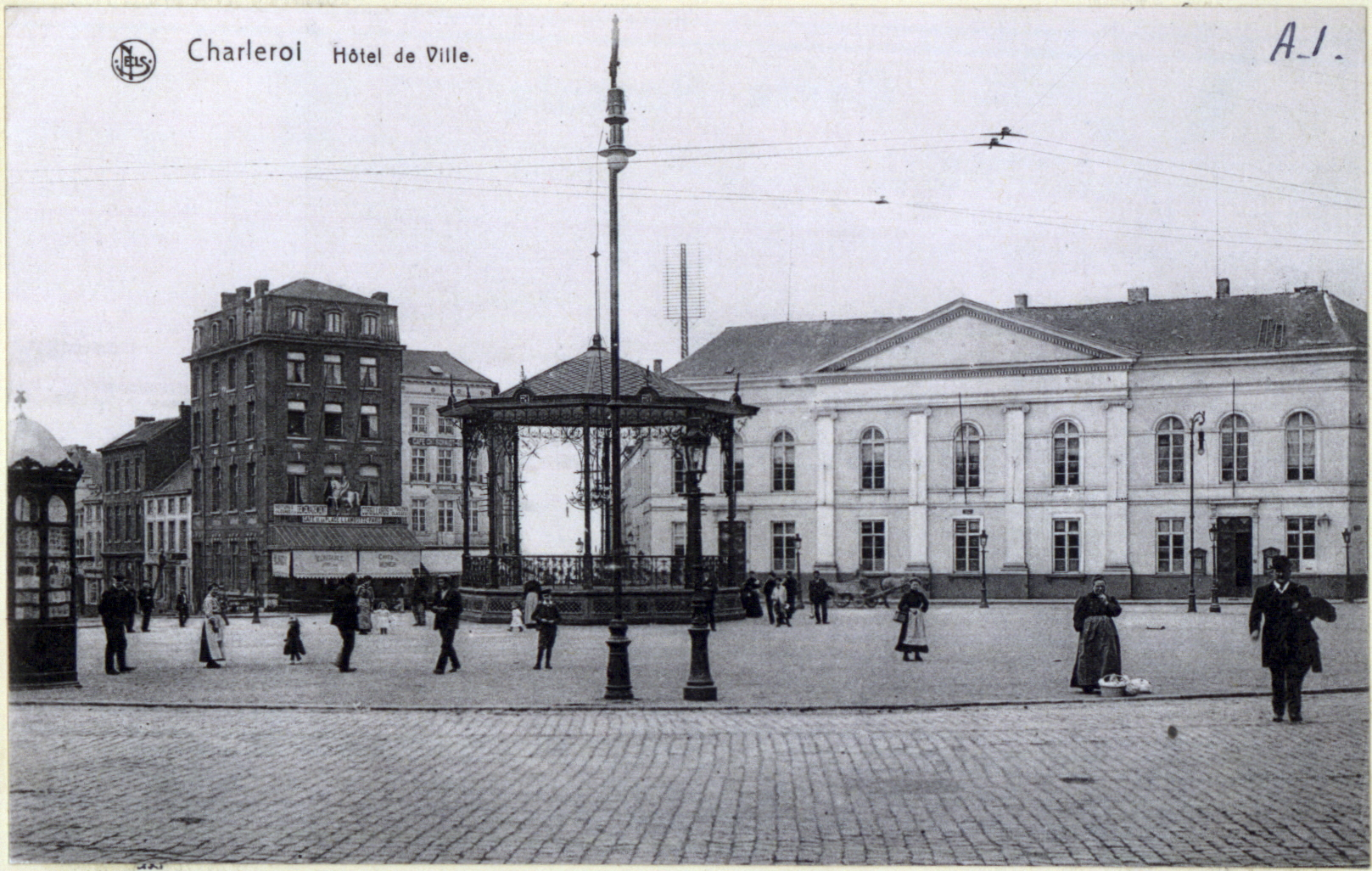
The building by Jean Kuypers later became the town hall of Charleroi (photo from the beginning of the 20th century).

On October 1, 1795, the Austrian Netherlands was annexed to France, and Charleroi became part of the Jemmapes department. The law of 27 "ventôse an VIII" (March 18, 1800), reforming the judicial system, created a court of first instance in Charleroi, despite protests from Thuin and Binche, which claimed the sea. On October 10, 1800, the court moved into a former military building in the Ville-Haute, then occupied by the municipal administration, which had moved to the Ville-Basse. The building was located on the site of Charleroi town hall. The building had been fitted out following public subscription but remained antiquated and inconvenient.

In 1826, under the Dutch regime, there was talk of abolishing the courthouse in Charleroi. To preserve it, the municipal authorities took charge of building a new courthouse. It was built in the same place in 1826, according to plans by architect Jean Kuypers.

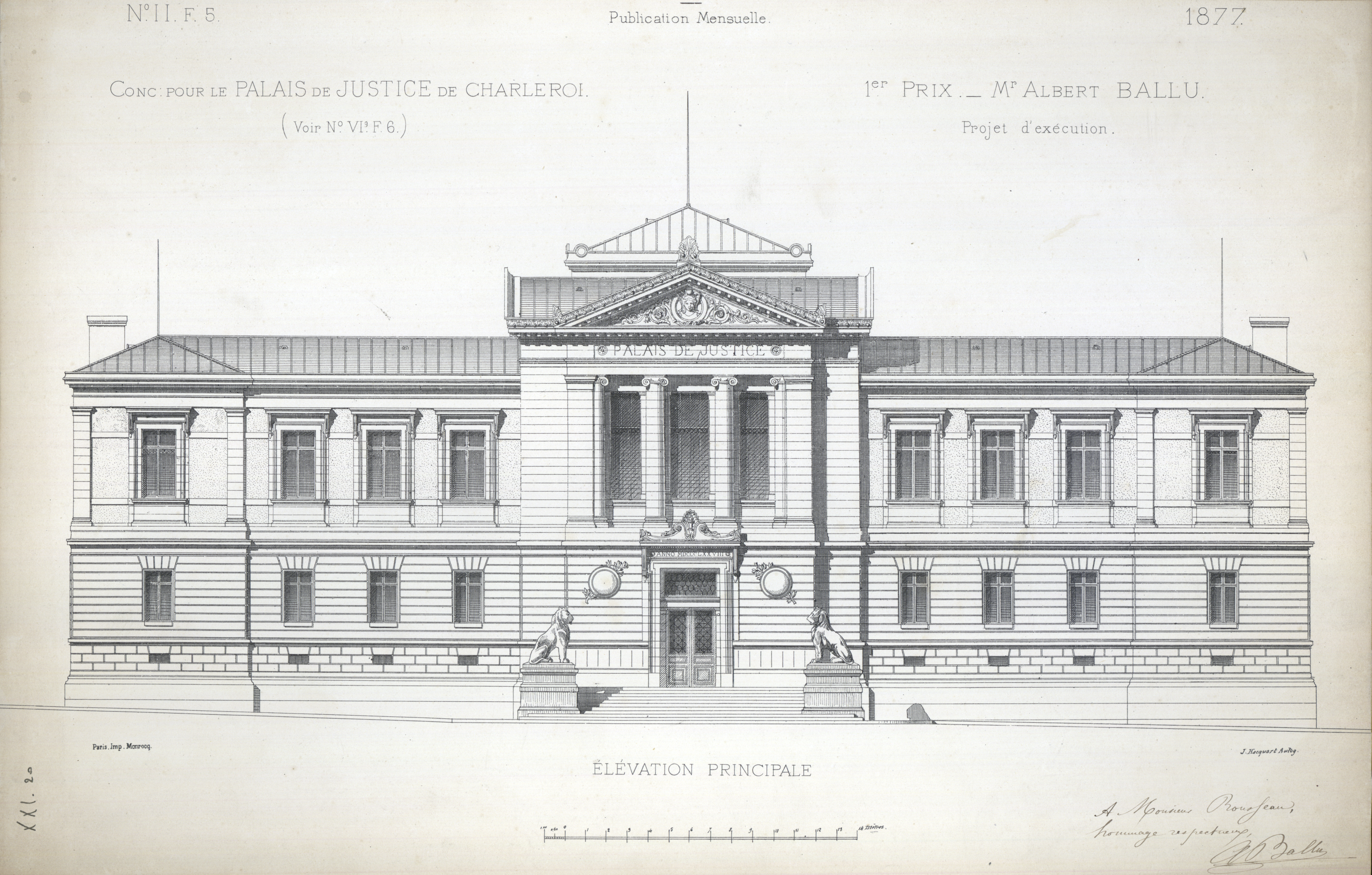
Project for the main facade designed in 1877 by Albert Ballu.

The growth in judicial business soon required more space. As early as 1850, municipal authorities held talks with higher authorities, but it wasn't until 1876 that it was decided to build a courthouse. The chosen place was Boulevard Central (now Boulevard Audent). Parisian architect Albert Ballu was selected following a competition. The palace, with its neoclassical facade, was inaugurated on July 10, 1880. Two cast-iron lions, designed by Antoine-Félix Bouré, stand at the top of the porch. They were nicknamed Totor and Tutur by journalist Louis-Xavier Bufquin des Essarts in his legal column in the Charleroi Journal.

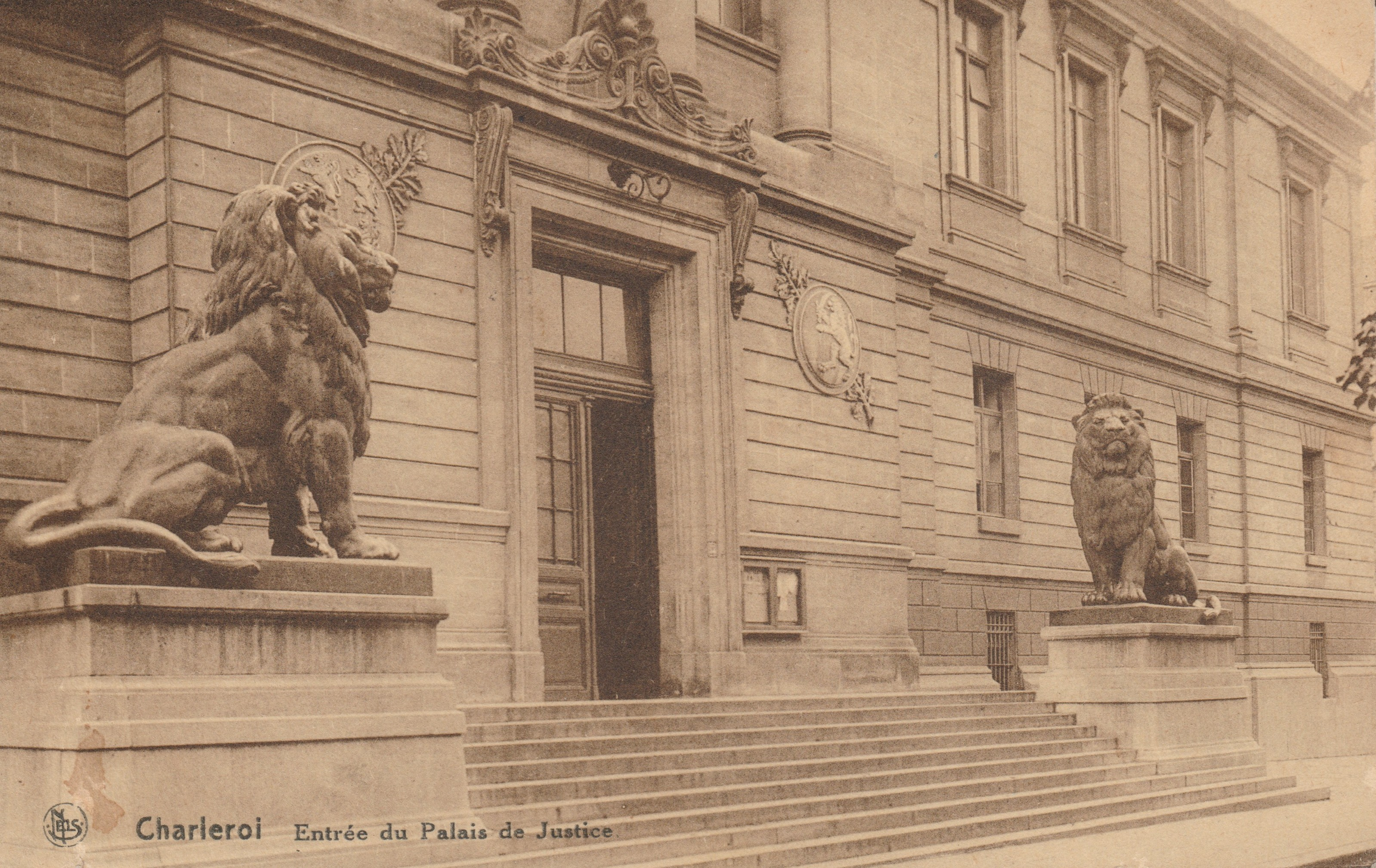
The lions on either side of the entrance.

When it was created, this courthouse had three large courtrooms, each with its own council room and a room reserved for witnesses. The increase in workload, directly proportional to the growth of the region over which the court extended its legal jurisdiction, meant that the premises also became too cramped. The number of judges increased from six to twenty-seven between 1880 and 1965. During the same period, the number of public prosecutors increased from one to twenty-three. The number of other users increased to the same proportions.

Added to this is the rapid dilapidation of the building, following a poor choice of materials by the architect, a cut stone which turned out to be very friable. “From being sumptuous as it appeared on the day of its inauguration, the palace had become a sort of gigantic hovel where it rained on stormy days and was too cold on winter days”. Plasters fell on the members of the court and listeners in the middle of session 15. From 1945, it became essential to build a new courthouse in Charleroi. It was not until 1969 that the palace on Boulevard Audent was definitively deallocated.

After the Second World War, the project was born to create the National Glass Institute, which would carry out research work whose results would be communicated to the glass industries that it would include among its members. The industry is facing economic difficulties and is financially unable to invest in research. At the same time, Mayor Joseph Tirou had the idea of building a Glass Museum. These two projects were materialized by an agreement signed on 27 mars 1950 which stipulates that a building that would house the Institute and the museum would be built by the State.

Under Mayor Octave Pinkers, plans were made to redevelop the Plaine de Manoeuvres and build the Glass Museum and a new courthouse in this space.

The project was entrusted to Jacques Depelsenaire, a native of Charleroi country and winner of the Prix de Rome. In 1952, he presented two projects for the Palais de Justice and one for the Glass Museum. The final plans were approved in 1954. The work, carried out in phases, stretched from 1959 to 1963 for the palace. The National Glass Institute moved into its buildings in 1967. For this building, Jacques Depelsenaire joined forces with Simon Brigode, also from Charleroi.

The Glass Museum was inaugurated on June 25, 1973 by Prince Albert II of Belgium. From 1976, an exhibition area was occupied by part of the collections of the Archaeological Museum of Charleroi whose building, inaugurated in 1879 on Boulevard Jacques Bertrand, had been closed since 1954, damaged following miner movements.

Due to the gradual disappearance of the glass industry, the activities of the Institute are also decreasing. At the end of the 20th century, the federal state, owner of the premises, wanted to install commercial and labor courts there. The Glass Museum then moved to the Bois du Cazier place, while the Archaeological Museum once again lost its exhibition space.

The transformation work began in 2006, led by the same architect who drew the original plans. In 2010, the work was completed and the building, renamed “Palais du Verre”, became an extension of the Palace of Justice.

== Architecture ==
The architectural image chosen for the Palace of Justice by Jacques Depelsenaire, is that of modernity and democratic openness, typical of the expression of the post-war modernist style.

The courthouse is spread out in a U shape in the lower part of the former maneuvering plain, now Jacques Depelsenaire Park. The buildings that make it up are set back from the road.

The central wing of the Palace which runs along the street Tumelaire rests partially on powerful pillars, which allow access to an interior courtyard extended by a monumental staircase that leads to the Palais du Verre.

The building has a concrete frame offering two types of facades, the first is opaque with a square frame in blue stone including projecting elements at regular spaces, and the second is glazed with the regular frame of the curtain facade.

The main access to the Palace of Justice is via an undulating canopy from Boulevard Général Michel.

== Integration of works of art ==
The facade towards Avenue Général Michel is decorated with a monumental work by André Hupet Justice Pursuing Evil. Next to the entrance of Boulevard de Fontaine is a sculpture by Alphonse Darville, Justice et Paix. Further along the same boulevard, there are two lions (Totor and Tutur) by Antoine-Félix Bouré from the old palace on Boulevard Audent that were reinstalled.

In the interior courtyard, you cannot miss two 'cyclopean' sculptures by Michel Stiévenart.

Inside, in the hall, are Bouffioulx stoneware ceramics by Marie-Henriette Bataille, Claire Lambert, and Paul Timper. A sculpture by Charles De Rouck is installed on the staircase. The courtrooms are decorated with frescoes by Émile Tainmont, a monumental painting by Marcel Vintevogel (police court), and a ceramic by Olivier Strebelle.

At the top of the Park, near the entrance to the Palais du verre, a tribute to Georges Lemaître by Jean-François Diord emerges from the infinity pool and on the other side of this building, a work by Boris Tellegen installed in 2014 as part of Asphalte#1, urban art biennial.

== Gallery ==
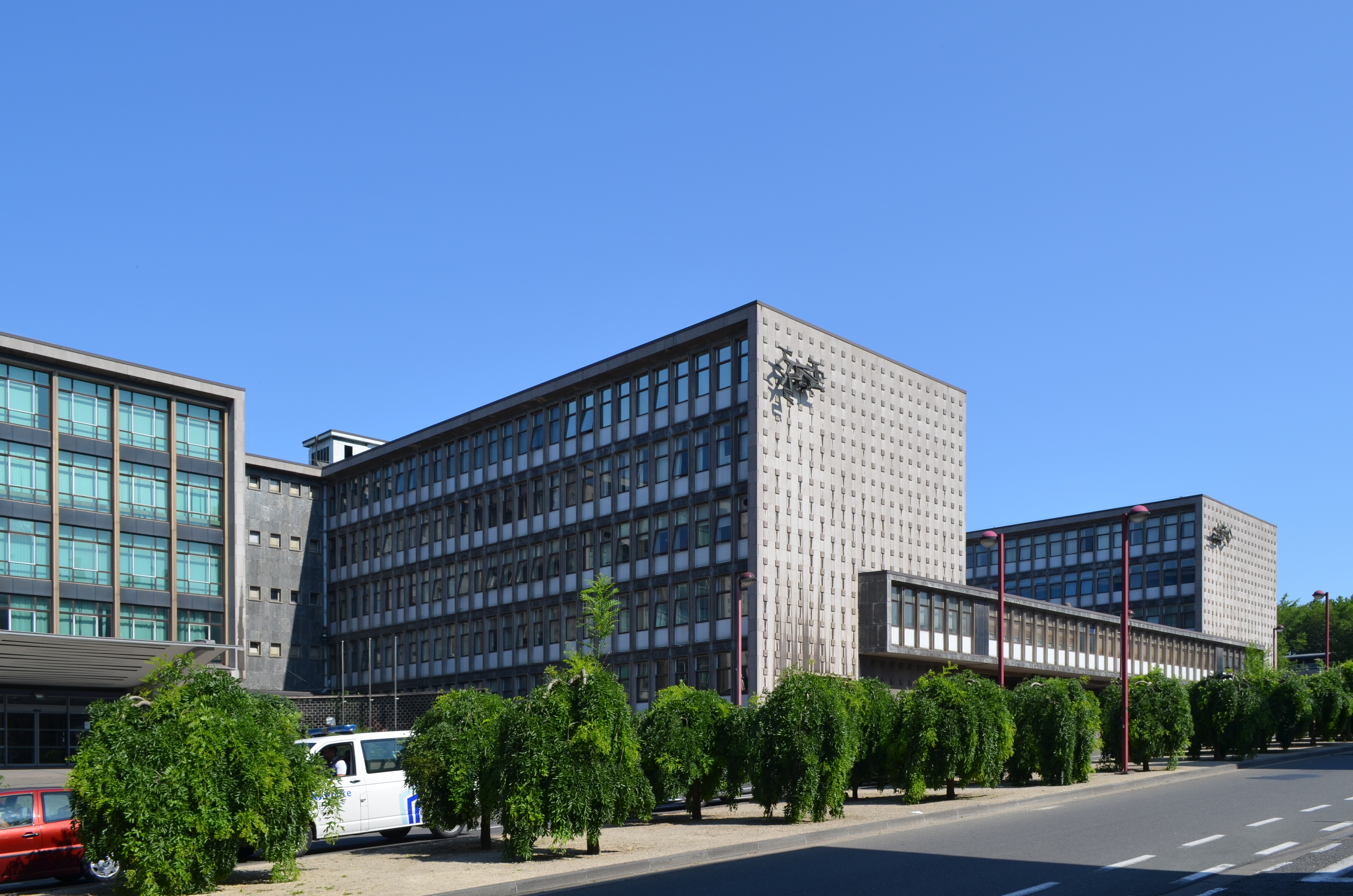
Facade on the Avenue Général Michel side.

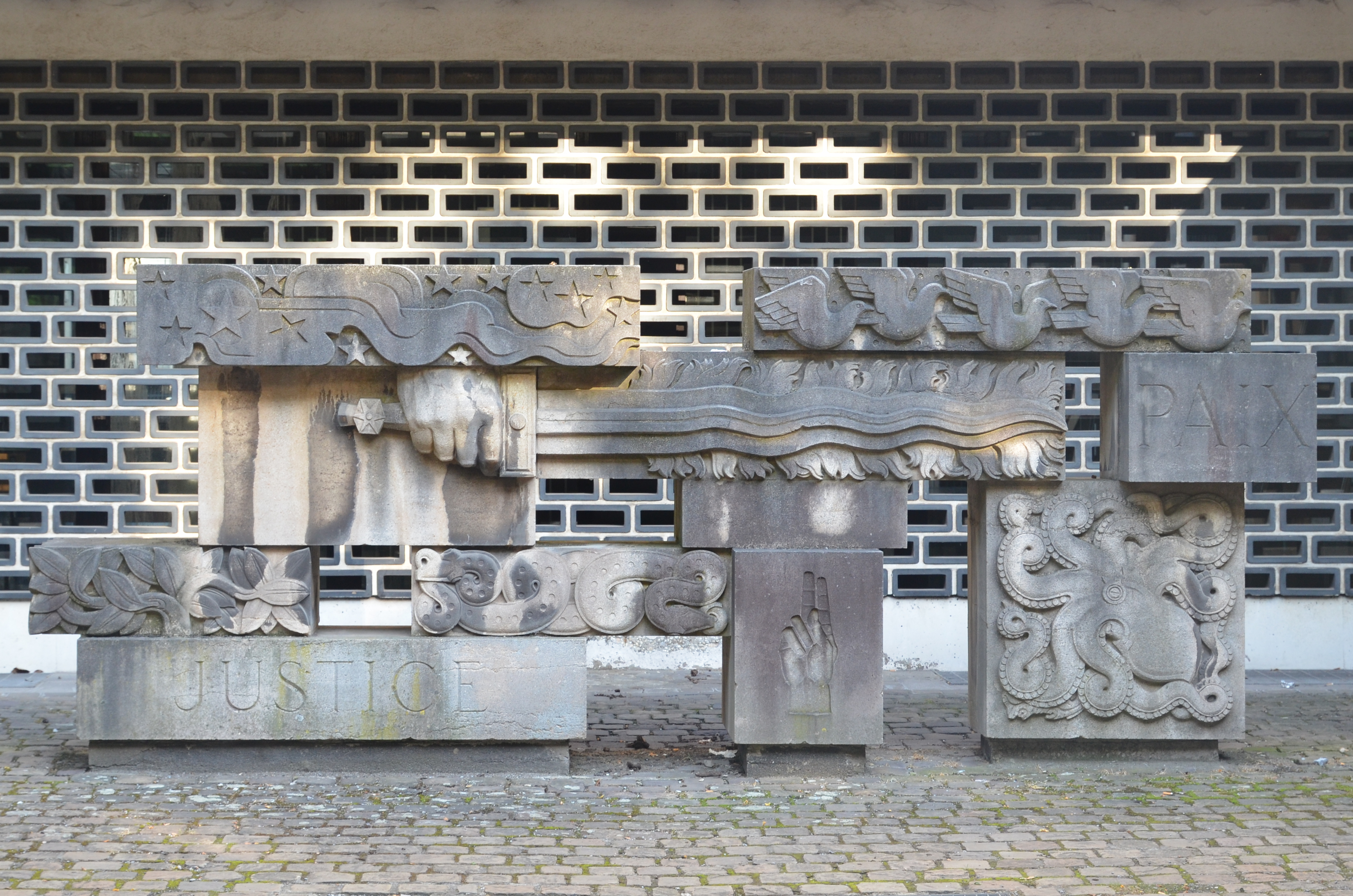
''Justice et Paix'', work by Alphonse Darville.

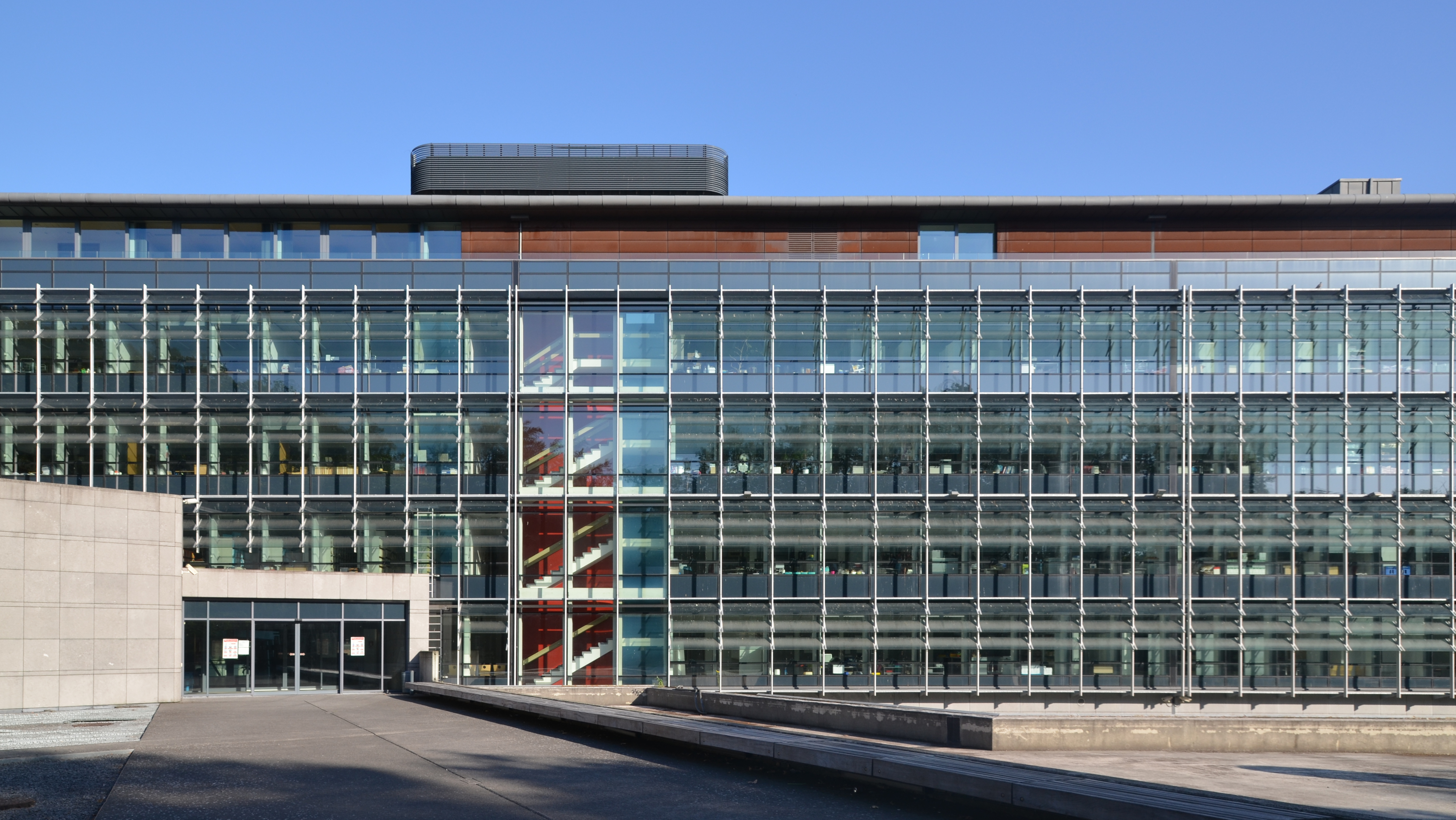
"Palais du Verre" seen from the front.

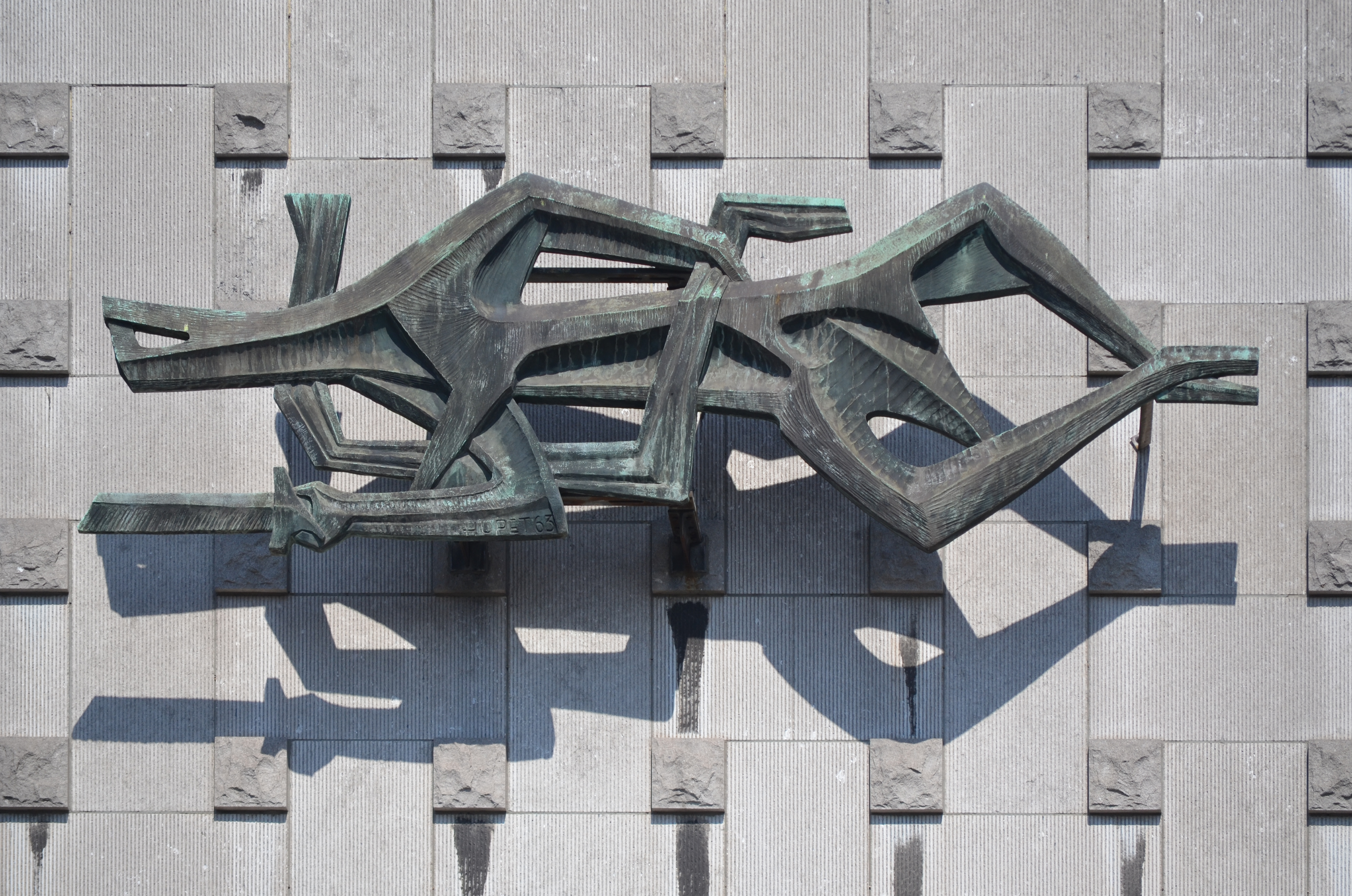
"La Justice poursuivant le Mal", work by André Hupet.

== See also ==
- Charleroi
- Thuin
- Binche
