= Tirou metro station =

Metro station in Charleroi, Belgium

Tirou

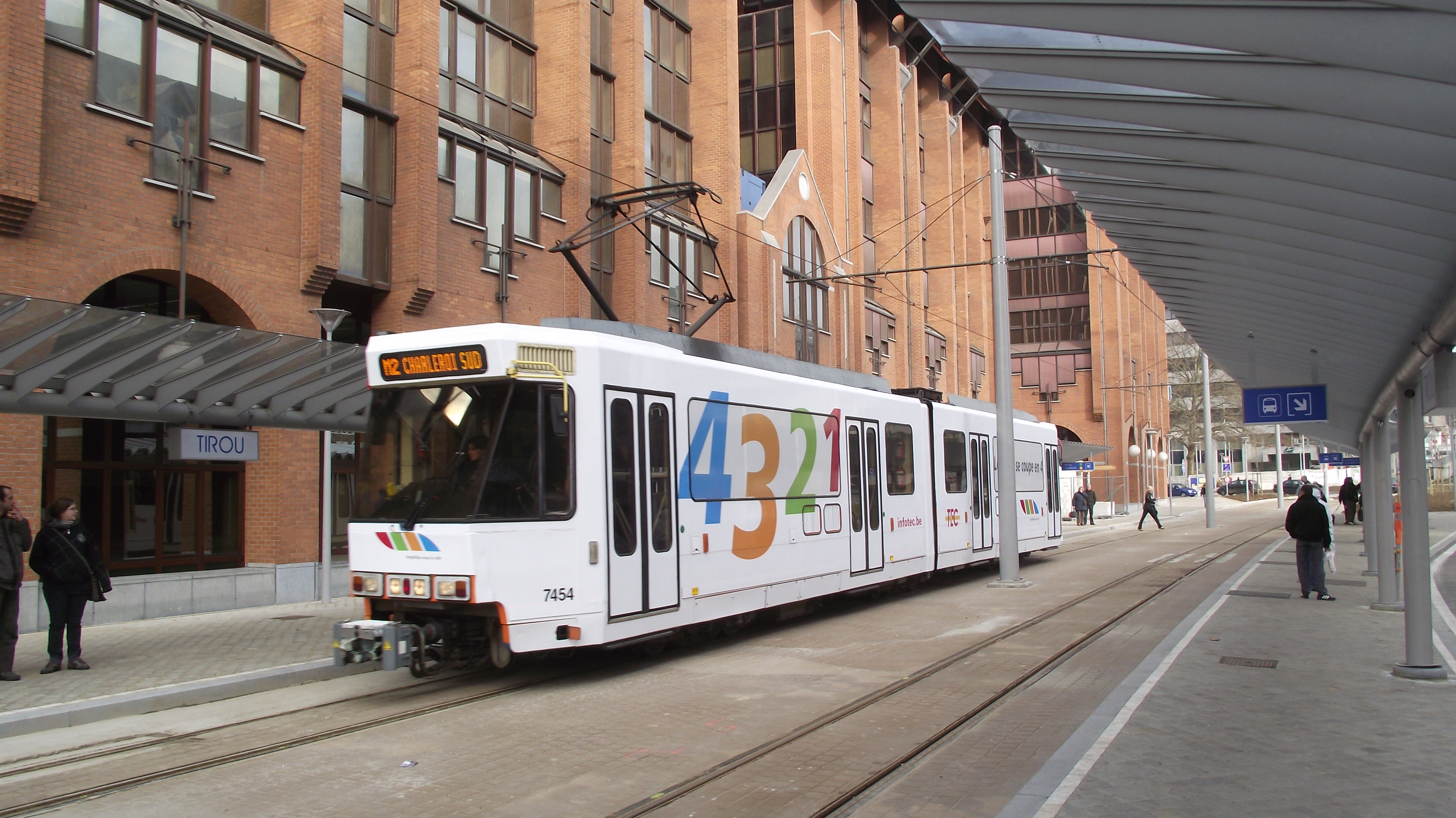

General information
- Location: Charleroi; Belgium
- Coordinates: 50°24′22″N 4°26′44″E
- Transit authority: TEC Charleroi
- Platforms: Lateral
- Tracks: 2

Construction
- Platform levels: 1
- Parking: No

Other information
- Fare zone: 1

History
- Opened: 27 February 2012

Services
Preceding station	Charleroi Metro	Following station
Sud One-way operation	M1	Parc towards Monument
Sud towards Monument	M2	Parc One-way operation
Sud towards Faubourg de Bruxelles	M3	Parc One-way operation
Sud One-way operation	M4	Parc towards Soleilmont
Location

Tirou (French pronunciation: [tiʁu]) is a Charleroi Metro station, located in downtown Charleroi, in fare zone 1. Tirou is an open-air station located at street level (Rue de l'écluse) and offers same-platform bus transfer.

The station's lateral platforms are publicly accessible and serve as regular street sidewalks.

The station and the nearby Tirou Boulevard are named after Joseph Tirou (1876–1952), a former Belgian politician and mayor of Charleroi.

== Nearby points of interest ==
- Boulevard Joseph Tirou, the main shopping district in the lower town of Charleroi.
- Institut Notre-Dame (Charleroi) school.
- Forem.

== Transfers ==
TEC Charleroi bus lines 1, 3, 18, 25, 35, 71, 138b, 451, CITY, M1ab, M4ab.

Media related to Tirou metro station (Charleroi) at Wikimedia Commons
