= Louise Bovie =

Belgian writer

- Born: Josine Natalie Louise Bovie; 1810
- Died: 11 January 1870 (age 59-60); Ixelles, Belgium
- Occupation: writer

Louise Bovie, full name Josine Natalie Louise Bovie (1810 – 11 January 1870), was a Belgian writer. She published a novella (un petit roman) called "La Perdrix" (The Partridge) under the pen name Marie Sweerts. She also wrote poetry and short stories, and contributed to the monthly literary journal Revue de belgique, where she was eulogized as having "a distinguished spirit."

Bovie was the elder sister of the painter and arts patron Virginie Bovie, with whom she toured Italy in 1855. Neither of the sisters ever married, and Louise eventually moved into Virginie's home on the rue du Trône in Ixelles, a suburb of Brussels, and they lived there together for many years. A third sister, Hortence, had married but was soon widowed. Louise Bovie died at Ixelles and is interred at Dilbeek.

== Contes posthumes ==
Contes posthumes, a 339-page collection of Bovie's stories published posthumously within a year of her death, included '"La Perdrix'" along with "Raphaël," "L'éducation particulière," "Le missionaire," and "Souvenirs d'un caillou." The publication was illustrated by V. Bovie. The stories were mostly realistic, with some Romantic influence in the choice and treatment of the subject matter, which included unjust imprisonment, revenge, suicide, incest, and spiritual trials.

A critic for The Athenaeum, writing in 1870, the year the Contes were published, remarked that Belgian writers of the day suffered from a lack of domestic interest, as Francophone readers preferred literature from France: "what keeps down authors is the coldness of the public, and the silence or hostility of criticism. This is also the reason why authors often go on to the end of their lives without curing themselves of certain faults which no one has been at the pains to draw their attention to." He adduces Bovie as an example, noting the "strong powers" evidenced by her writing, as well as a "warm sensibility" that in the story "Raphaël", about the incestuous desire between a young painter and his mother, became excessive. As a whole, however, the collection was judged to be marred by "sad inequalities, failures and exaggerations." The review in what might be considered her "home" publication, Le revue belgique, thought the collection earned her a worthy place among Belgian short-story writers, but was overall tepid even in its praise.

== See also ==
- Belgian literature
