= Claire Lambe (artist) =

Artist, sculptor

Claire Lambe (born 1962) is a visual artist born in Macclesfield, England who lives and works in Melbourne, Australia. She was part of the National Gallery of Australia's 2021–22 Know My Name exhibition, and featured in the National Gallery of Victoria's exhibition, Melbourne Now.

== Biography ==
Lambe completed a Bachelor of Fine Art at Bristol College of Art in 1985, followed by postgraduate studies at the University of New South Wales in 1990 and a Master of Fine Arts at Goldsmiths, London in 1995.

From 2010 to 2012, Lambe established the artist-run space Death Be Kind with Elvis Richardson.

== Exhibitions ==
Lambe has participated in various solo, group and collaborative exhibitions. Significant exhibitions include:

- The Memorial (2010)
- The Rest is Silence (2011)
- Yakety Sax (2011)
- "Northern Riot (2014)". smh.com.au.
- LazyBoy (2012)
- Melbourne Now (2013–2014)
- West Space, Melbourne (2013)
- Neverwhere, Gaia Gallery, Istanbul (2014)
- Spring 1883 art fair (2014)
- Lurid Beauty, National Gallery of Victoria, Melbourne (2015)
- Mother Holding Something Horrific, Australian Centre for Contemporary Art, Melbourne (2017)
- From Will to Form: TarraWarra Biennial, Victoria (2018)

== Artwork ==
Lambe produces installation, sculpture and ready made objects. Components in her work are drawn from cultural and historical references such as Northern English Club Culture of the 1970s, motherhood, subconscious and the abject.

Lambe's process involves exorcising images and objects that have lodged in her memory: there are subconscious associations at work. In drawing from films and museum objects, the work is also speaking back to culture. In this way, Lambe's work attempts to re-possess earlier forms of transgression. Lambe has strategically occupied a number of different sites of sexual exploitation and perversion, including 1970s' sexploitation cinema and the works of Marcel Duchamp. Lambe's occupation is neither a celebration nor a critique, but something has shifted through her re-possession of these forms.

Lambe uses the tactile and transformative possibilities of sculpture to unsettle conventional notions of gender and sexuality. Her work for the 2013 exhibition Melbourne Now, held at the National Gallery of Victoria, uses the female body to address underlying histories of violence, social discontent and sexual promiscuity, shifting between hard-edged minimalism, abjection, and humour.
