= Léon Mignon =

Belgian sculptor

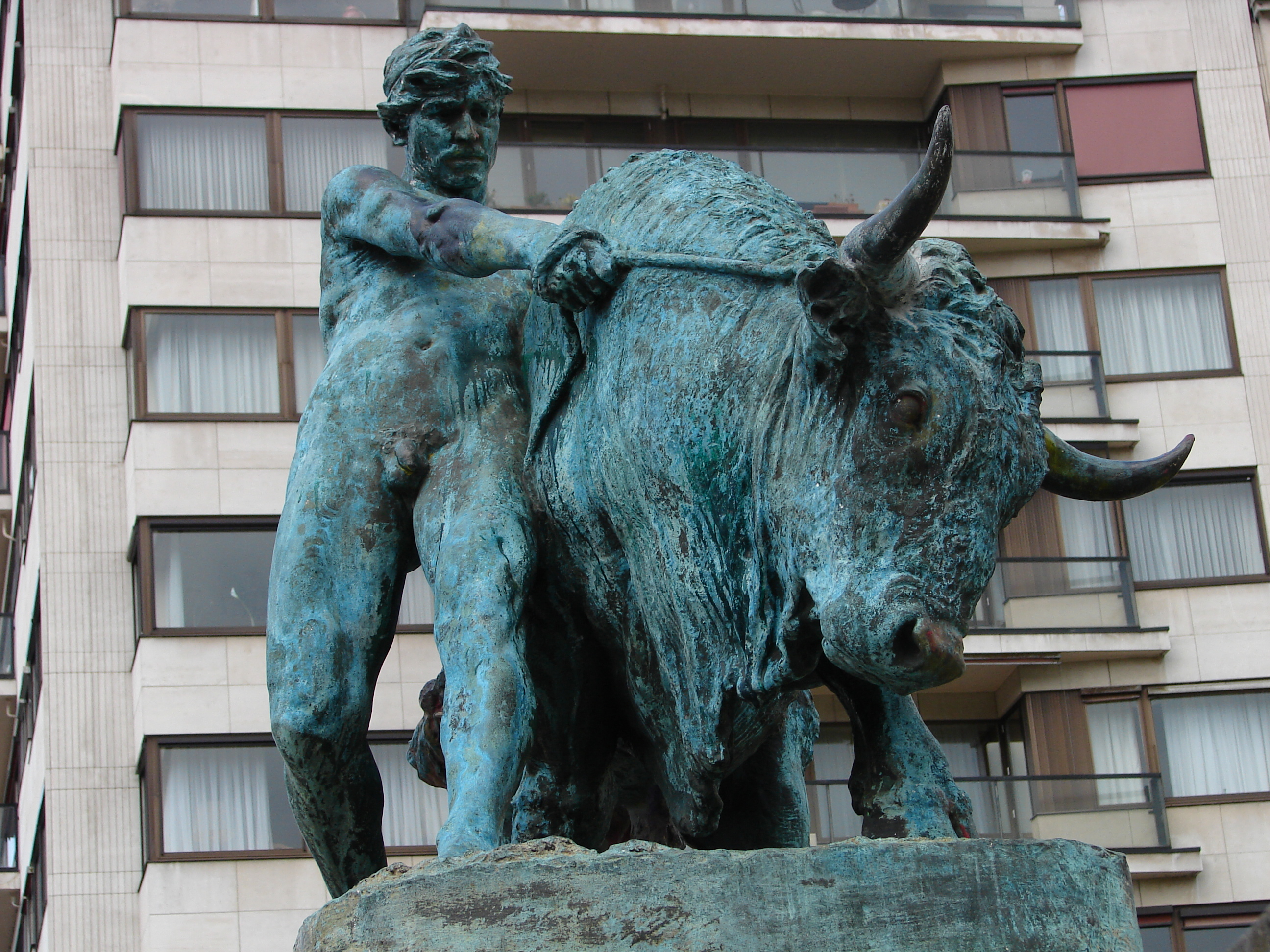
Li Tore (1881), the Terrasses d'Avroy, Liège

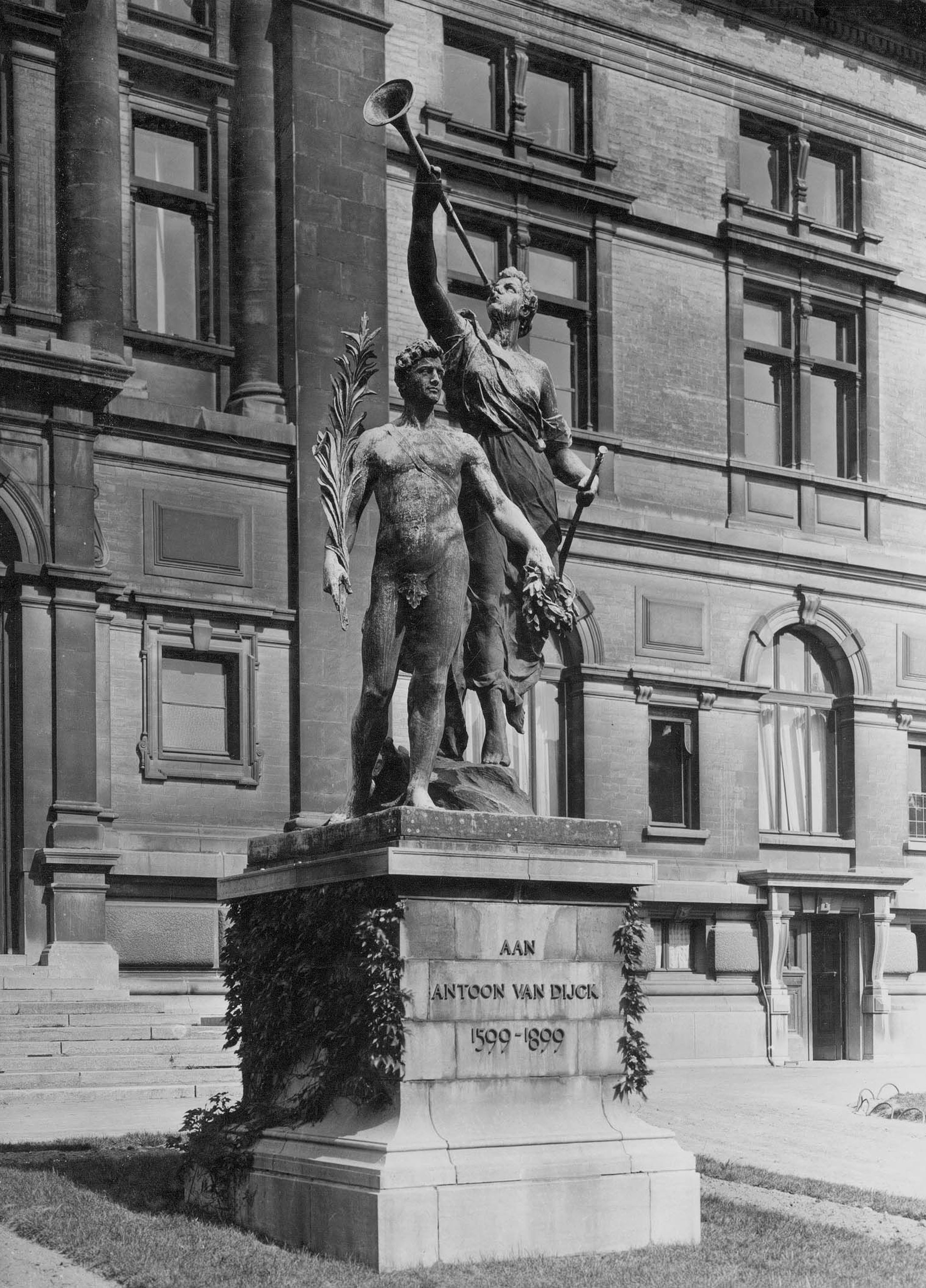
De Faam (1899), which honours Anthony van Dyck, located outside the Royal Museum of Fine Arts Antwerp

Léon Mignon (9 April 1847 in Liège – 30 September 1898 in Schaerbeek) was a Belgian sculptor working in a realist idiom, known for his depiction of bulls.

Born at Liège, Léon Mignon completed his studies at the Académie royale des Beaux-Arts de Liège in 1871. He made his first showing at the Salon of Ghent, and obtained a fellowship from the Fondation Darchis for further study in Italy.

He set up his studio in Paris in 1876 in collaboration with Paul de Vigne, then settled permanently at Schaerbeek. He won a gold medal at the Paris Salon for his sculpture Li Tore, the Bull-Tamer (illustration) which provoked polemics from critics for its combination of nudity with forthright realism.

Li Tore, set up at Liège, became the mascot of the students, who hid it in the cellars of the Académie to protect it during World War II. The bull has become an emblem for all Liège, with the city motto "Liège, forcer l’avenir!", "Liège, make the future happen!"

A bronze on a similar theme, his Le Dompteur de Taureaux (1881), which had been noticed at the retrospective exhibition of Belgian sculpture the previous year (in its plaster model), and was championed by Gustave Rolin-Jaequemyns, Minister of the Interior, stands on the Terrasses d'Avroy, Liège. Though a scarf had been added to the model to disguise the figure's nudity, the sculpture scandalised the editors of the Catholic daily, La Gazette de Liège.

One among his animalier sculptures is to be seen at the Botanical Garden of Brussels: The Olive Tree, or Peace, representing an agricultural worker with his ox. His early Combat de taureaux dans la campagne romaine is conserved in the Musée Royal des Beaux-Arts, Brussels.

Other sculptures include Hide-and-Seek and Lady Godiva.

Both Schaerbeek and Liège possess a rue Léon Mignon.
