= SONACA =

Belgian aerospace company

Sonaca Group
- Type: SA
- Industry: Aerospace
- Founded: 10 April 1978
- Headquarters: Gosselies, Charleroi (Hainaut Province), Belgium
- Number of employees: 4,630
- Subsidiaries: LMI Aerospace, Sonaca Montréal, Sonaca Brasil, Sinelson, Sonaca Aircraft, Sonaca Space
- Website: www.sonaca.com

The Sonaca Group, short for Societe Nationale de Construction Aerospatiale ("National Aerospace Construction Company") is a Belgian aerospace company. The company has subsidiaries in the United States, Canada, Mexico, Brazil, China, Romania, Sri Lanka and Spain. In 2018, the Sonaca Group's operating revenues amounted to $900 million. The Sonaca Group employs 4,630 workers as of 2018. 92.604% of the company is owned by SRIW S.A. (French: Société Régionale d'Investissement de Wallonie), 7.393% is owned by SFPI S.A. (French: Société Fédérale de Participations et d'Investissement) and 0.003% is owned by SABCA S.A.

The primary activities of the Sonaca Group are the design and construction of the movable elements of wings (slats and flaps) and complex structural components for civil and military aircraft. In addition, the Sonaca Group has continuously developed its design and construction activities in space structures.

== History ==
=== SEGA ===
Sonaca is an heir of the Belgian company Avions Fairey, but before that was SEGA (French: Société Générale d'Entreprises Aéronautiques). SEGA was created on 25 June 1920, witnessed by the notary Maillard, by a group of local notables: Fernand Loescher, Victor Dupuis, Alphonse and Désiré Jaumin, André Gobbe, Marius Loiselet and Arille Carlier.

The first activity developed by SEGA was a flying school launched by Commander Fernand Jacquet, a 7-victory WWI-ace and a leading figure in military aviation, a position from which he resigned in January 1921. In July 1921, Jacquet obtained a major contract for training military pilots, which for nearly ten years was the primary activity of SEGA. The company gradually acquired all the land that constituted the embryo of what is now the Gosselies Aerodrome. In the 1920s, SEGA carried out repairs, produced under license 5 AVIA BH-21, as well as prototypes of the HB-1 based on plans by Henri Bulté.

=== Avions Fairey ===
In 1931, when Belgium bought 43 Fairey Firefly IIM aircraft, the contract stipulated that part of the equipment (33) had to be manufactured in Belgium. Faced with SABCA's refusal to produce these licensed aircraft, Fairey UK (Hayes) decided to create a subsidiary under the direction of Ernest Oscar Tips, Société Belge des Avions Fairey, using SEGA's aerodrome, facilities, and qualified staff. During the first eight years of activity, the company produced 250 aircraft.

Then, Avions Fairey produced the Fairey Fox, a light bomber derived from Firefly IIM. The Tipsy range of light aircraft was developed and built at Fairey factories under the impetus of Ernest O.Tips. Another development of Fairey factories was the Fairey Fantôme, an improved version of the Firefly IIM. This biplane was known for its elegant lines but was technologically outdated. It was not commercially successful.

In order to urgently rearm military aeronautics at the dawn of the Second World War, in parallel with the order for the British-made Hawker Hurricane Mk1, an order for 80 aircraft to be manufactured in Belgium was placed. Only two planes could still be delivered before the conflict broke out. At dawn on May 10, 1940, the factory was seriously damaged by a German bombardment. SEGA was inactive until 1946, when the maintenance activity of the Belgian Air Force aircraft and some civil aviation administration aircraft resumed.

From 1950 onwards, the factory began to produce the Meteor F.8 for the Belgian and Dutch air forces. From 1953 to 1958, it then produced the fuselages of the Hawker Hunters of the same air forces. In 1957, it manufactured the Tipsy Nipper, a cheap single-engine single-seater equipped with a 25 HP VW motor. From 1957 to 1963, SEGA carried out the maintenance of the Belgian Air Force's F-84F. When six European countries chose to acquire F-104G combat planes, "Avions Fairey" and SABCA joined forces to produce them. The Belgian F-104G aircraft were produced between January 1962 and June 1965. Between 1964 and 1971, "Avions Fairey" also performed some maintenance work on the Luftwaffe's F-104G aircraft.

From May 1960, based on instructions from the British government to rationalise its aeronautical industry, Fairey UK had completely divested itself of the sector by selling its aeronautical activities to Westland. In 1968, SEGA was incorporated into the capital of Fairey S.A. In 1972, the English company "Fairey Aviation" bought Britten-Norman, which was virtually bankrupt despite its interesting twin-engine BN-2 Islander utility plane. The idea was to boost sales and production at the Gosselies plant, which was sorely lacking in a work plan. Initially, the Islander was manufactured in Romania and completed in Gosselies, where they were then produced entirely, including the Trislander development. The Belgian army acquired 12 Islanders in 1976.

=== Sonaca ===
The UK subsidiary had financial difficulties, which led to its liquidation on 11 October 1977 and which spread to its Belgian subsidiary. However, Belgium had chosen the F-16 as its multi-role aircraft, and its industry was already well-engaged in a multinational partnership (Netherlands, Belgium, Denmark, Norway) for the production of the F-16 in Europe. The Belgian government decides to buy the company to ensure the sustainability of its participation in this contract. Thus, Avions Fairey, whose activity had never been interrupted after its request for a composition on 30 September 1977, officially took over under the name of Sonaca - an acronym for “Société Nationale de Construction Aérospatiale” - as from 1 June 1978. In this major contract, Sonaca manufactured the rear fuselage and assembled the F16.

=== Sonaca Group ===
From the 2000s onward, Sonaca began its expansion as the Sonaca Group.

In the 2000s, Sonaca opened a subsidiary near Embraer in Brazil called Sobraer. It is located in São José dos Campos and mainly manufactures fuselage parts. Since 2004, two more factories have been involved in supplying small aircraft parts, Pesola and Sopecaero. All Brazilian subsidiaries are currently in the process of merging into Sonaca Brasil.

In 2007, Sonaca's Canadian subsidiary received support from the Government of Montreal to invest $17 million in the expansion of its aircraft wing manufacturing and assembly plant. In December 2017, Sonaca's Canadian subsidiary acquired a giant CNC machine for $7.5 million to manufacture giant parts at very high speeds.

In 2010, Sonaca acquired a subsidiary in China, Sinelson. Later, in 2016, it acquired another subsidiary in Romania, Sonaca Transilvania.

On September 16, 2015, Sonaca created a new subsidiary, Sonaca Aircraft, to develop a new two-seater training and leisure aircraft. On June 19, 2017, Sonaca conducted the first test flight of the Sonaca 200, a prototype two-seater training aircraft scheduled to go into production in the fall. It became the first Belgian-made aircraft since the Tipsy Nipper produced between 1957 and 1961. Sonaca Aircraft will present the final version of the Sonaca 200 in April 2018 at the Friedrichshafen Air Show. One year later, the company will present the Sonaca 200 Trainer Pro at the same show. Its assembly site is located on the edge of the Namur-Suarlee Airfield in Temploux.

In 2017, Sonaca acquired LMI Aerospace for €405.5 million. LMI Aerospace employs 2,856 people in three countries: the United States, Mexico, and Sri Lanka. The company, although integrated, will continue to be called LMI Aerospace. In addition, it will maintain its headquarters in Missouri.

== Production ==
=== Military ===
Between 1979 and 1991, Sonaca assembled 160 F-16 for Belgium and 60 for Denmark. As part of the F-16 program, Sonaca was a supplier to Lockheed Martin for the latest versions of the F-16. A total of 1,389 rear fuselages (Aft Fuselage) were delivered, and 222 complete structures (Airframe) were integrated. In the military field, Sonaca is involved in the following projects:

- A400M:
  - Leading edge of wings and their associated anti-icing system
  - Main doors of the landing-gear
  - Main structures connecting to engine nacelles.
- B-Hunter: Belgian variant of the Hunter unmanned aerial vehicle (UAV) developed with IAI since 1998, and in service in the Belgian army.

=== Civil ===
In the civil sector, Sonaca is involved in the following projects:

- Airbus
  - All mobile leading edges and their rails, for all Airbus from the A310 to the latest A350, have been developed and produced by Sonaca as a single source.
  - Airbus A380: in addition, "Nose Upper Shell" fuselage structure
- Embraer
  - Embraer ERJ 135/140/145 and Legacy
    - Complete sections of central and aft fuselage
    - Engine mounting pylons
    - Fixed leading edge wings and associated anti-icing system (development, certification and production).
  - Embraer 170/190 E1 & E2 jets
    - Mobile leading edge wings, their actuators and anti-ice system
    - All central fuselage panels, Keel beam
    - Trailing edge flaps
  - Embraer 175/195 E1 & E2 jets
    - E1: Wing slats, wing slats mechanisms
    - E2: Wing slats, wing slat mechanisms, wing flap mechanisms, flap track fairing
- Dassault Aviation's Falcon 7X and Falcon 8X
  - Fixed and mobile wing leading edges
- The company also collaborates with Boeing on various projects

=== Space ===
In the space sector, Sonaca's core activity is the development and construction of flight structures, both metallic and composite, including satellite platforms and instruments. Sonaca has been involved in numerous projects over the past 30 years, including the European shuttle Hermes, Atmospheric Re-entry Demonstrator (ARD), GSTP, FESTIP, Crew Rescue Vehicle (CRV-X38), SPOT5, ISS Columbus, Mars Beagle 2, Aladin-Aeolus, Corot, Pléiades, MUSIS, MPCV Tank Bulkhead, MWI and ICI instruments from MetOp SG.

== Activity sites ==
Belgium:

- Sonaca HQ: head office of the Sonaca group, which develops, manufactures and assembles advanced structures for the civil, military and space markets.
- Sonaca Aircraft: Light aircraft manufacturing

Brazil (Sonaca Brasil):

- Sobraer: Assembly and finishing for Embraer and Airbus
- Sopeçaero : Production of sheet metal parts
- Pesola: machining

Canada:

- Sonaca Montreal: machining and forming of wing panels

China:

- Sinelson: assembly of the leading edges of Airbus A320s assembled on Airbus' final assembly line (FALC) in Tianjin. Closed following coronavirus crisis.

Romania:

- Sonaca Transilvania based in Cluj-Napoca: composite parts manufacturing and assembly

USA

- Machining: Aluminum small and medium machining parts, hard metal machining
- Forming: Large and small sheets
- Composite: Hand-lay-up, thermoplastic
- Assembly: Manual and automated, electro-mechanical
- Space
- Services

Sri Lanka

- Services

Mexico

- Forming: small sheet
