= Tipsy B =

B or Trainer
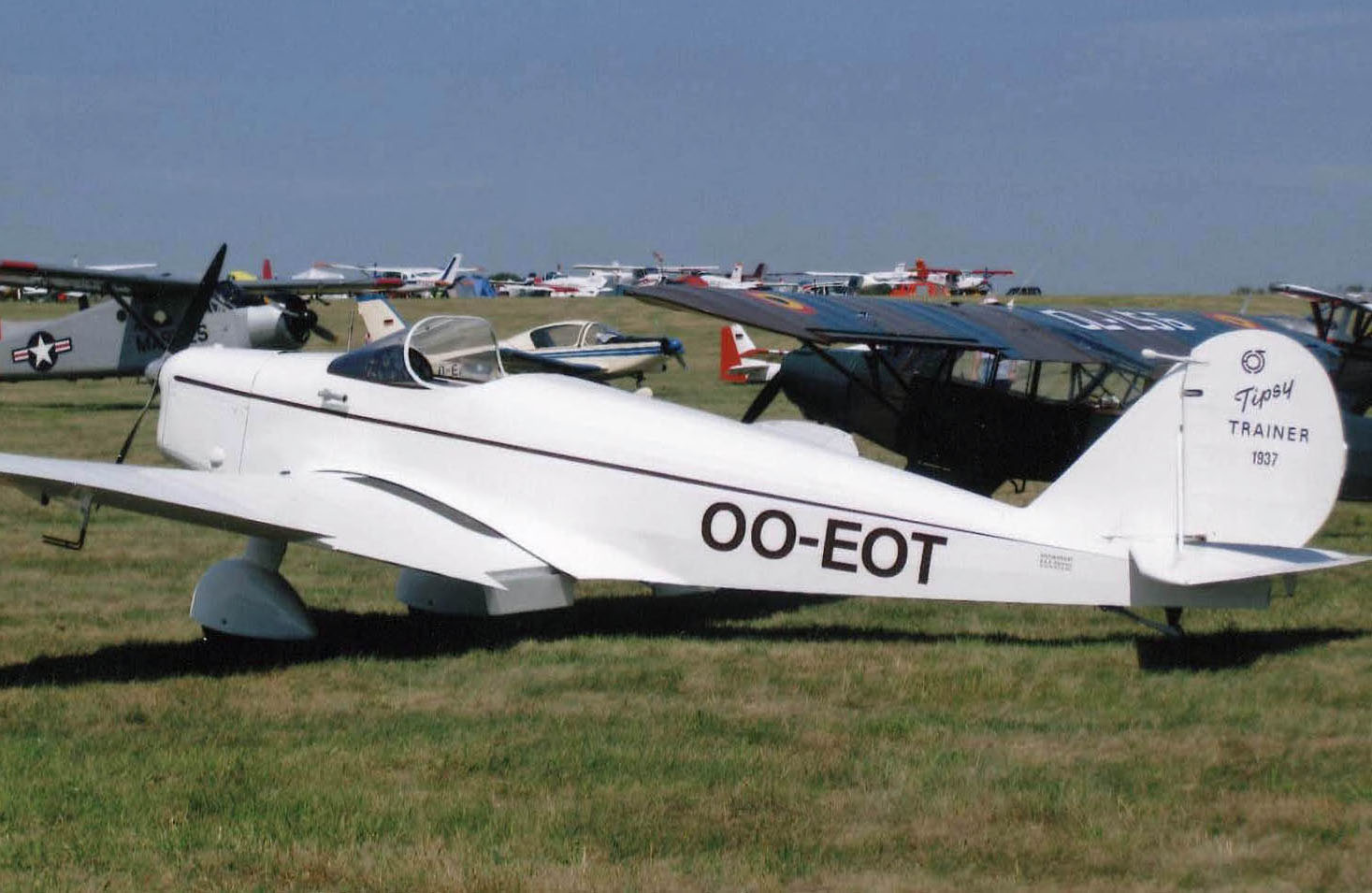
- 1937-built Tipsy B at the Schaffen-Diest (Belgium) rally in August 2009. Its registration incorporates the initials of its designer.

General information
- Type: Two-seat sport aircraft
- National origin: Belgium
- Manufacturer: Avions Tipsy, Gosselies Aerodrome, Charleroi
- Designer: Ernest Oscar Tips
- Number built: 42

History
- First flight: 8 May 1937

The Tipsy B was a small sports two-seat monoplane designed by Ernest Oscar Tips, and built in both Belgium and the UK. A total of 42 was built, and a few are still flying.

== Design and development ==
Avions Fairey, the Fairey Aviation Company's Belgian subsidiary, was set up in 1930–1 to produce Fairey Fox and Firefly aircraft for the Belgian Air Force. Once production of the military aircraft was under way, its manager Ernest Oscar Tips found the time to design and build light aircraft of his own, first the single-seat Tipsy S and S.2 in 1935, then the two-seat Tipsy B. Although the latter was larger, the two aircraft types had much in common; both were single-engined low wing cantilever monoplanes, with wings tapered on the trailing edges. In detail, though, the planforms of the two aircraft were different. Both were built in Belgium by Avions Fairey and in the UK under licence.

The Tipsy B was a wooden framed machine, covered with a mixture of plywood and canvas. The wing had an I-section main spar at about one quarter chord and an auxiliary rear box spar. These were linked by a rigid diagonal pyramid bracing. Stressed plywood skin was used from the main spar forward, with the rest of the wing fabric covered over wooden ribs. The leading edge was almost straight, and the trailing edge straight but strongly forward swept except at the centre section. Differential ailerons were carried on the tapering section, so their hinge line was also strongly forward swept.

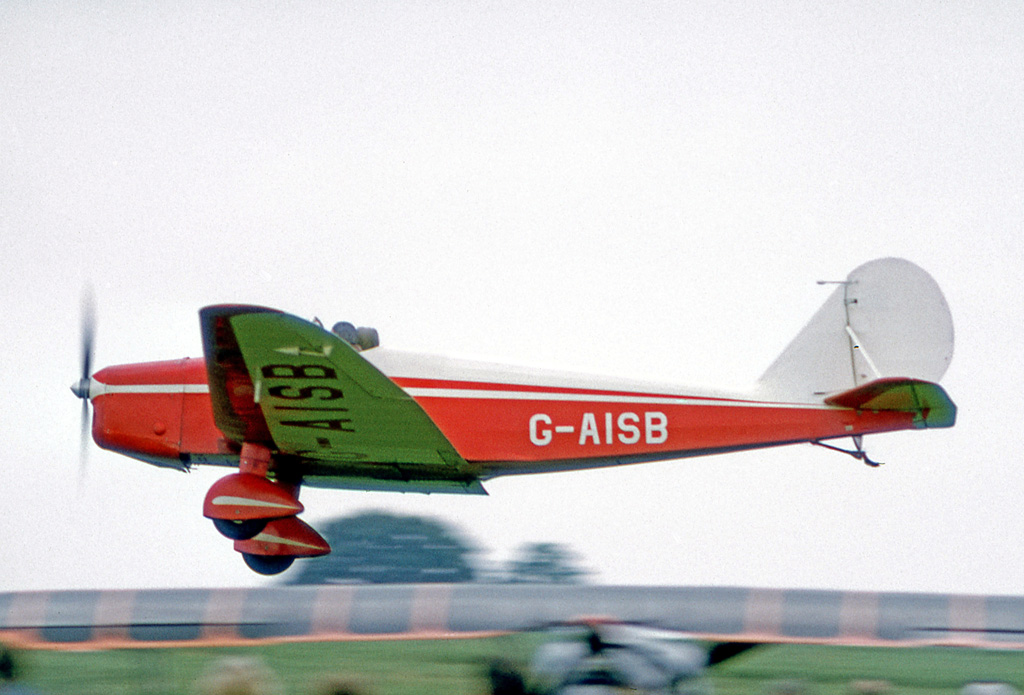
Tipsy B Series 1 built in the UK postwar

The flat sided fuselage had four spruce longerons, and was plywood covered apart from a rounded decking. The depth of the decking behind the cockpit depended on whether the seating was open or closed. The Tipsy B had an open cockpit, with almost side-by-side seating in the sense that the seats were slightly staggered fore and aft to minimise fuselage width, with the left hand seat 8in (200 mm) further forward. The Tipsy Bc had the same seat arrangement, but enclosed under a Rhodoid (cellulose acetate) canopy, faired into the fuselage rearwards by a much deeper decking. Some Tipsy Bs had an asymmetric windscreen formed out of a single Rhodoid sheet, with its free edge further forward on the left to match the displaced seating, but symmetrical screens became common. Dual controls were fitted. The control column was on the mid-line between the seats, with a horizontal extension that could be rotated over either position. A 60 hp (45 kW) Walter Mikron four cylinder inverted in-line engine drove a two-bladed propeller.

The fin was almost triangular, and built as an integral part of the fuselage. The fabric covered rudder was rounded, and moved between the separate elevators, which with the tail plane formed an elliptical shape. As a result, the elevator hinges, like those of the ailerons were strongly forward swept. The tailplane was braced to the fin near the rudder post with a pair of struts. There was a long tailskid. The main undercarriage had two cantilever forks with rubber-in-compression springing, its legs faired and the wheels spatted.

On 8 May 1937, the Tipsy B first flew from the Avions Fairey factory airfield at Gosselies, near Charleroi, with A.J.Eyskens at the controls. A week later, the Tipsy was being demonstrated in the UK at Great West Aerodrome. On 5 June 1937, the Tipsy Light Aircraft Company of London Air Park, Hanworth was established to build the Tipsy B under licence.

In total, twenty-four Tipsy B and Bc aircraft were built at Avions Fairey before the invasion of Belgium by Germany in World War II. About eight had open cockpits (Tipsy B) and the rest were enclosed (Tipsy Bc).

The Tipsy seems to have been mostly nice to fly but, as with other aircraft with pointed wing tips, its low speed behaviour could be unforgiving, dropping a wing at the stall without much warning. Some of these issues were addressed during the British production run, .

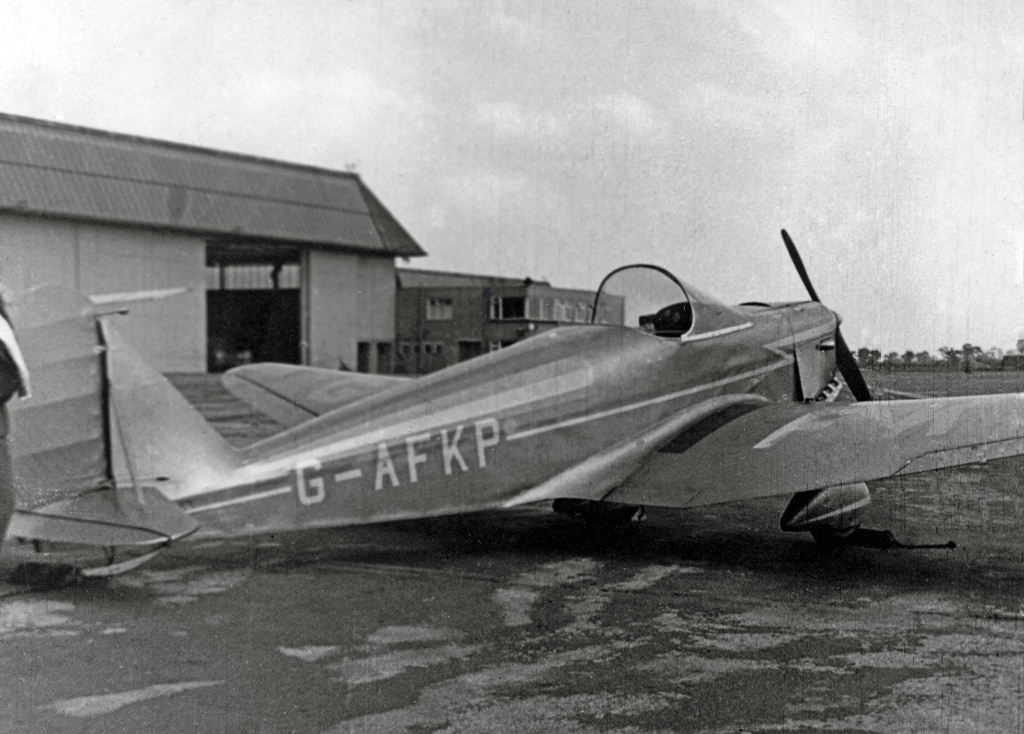
1938 UK-built Tipsy Trainer 1 at Manchester (Ringway) Airport in 1949. This widely travelled aircraft was lost in a crash in Sudan in 1952.

The fourth British aircraft was the first to be modified. To improve the stalling behaviour, it had a strengthened wing with washout at the tips, so that this part of the wing should not stall first, and camber-changing flaps were added to the straight centre section to delay the stall. To meet British airworthiness concerns about control surface flutter, all were mass-balanced. The rudder balance was external, projecting from its leading edge just above the tip of the fin. The elevator was also revised to a single unit with a straight hinge and trailing edge, and the bottom of the rudder slightly cropped to allow it to move. Subsequent British Tipsys included these changes, and from the sixth aircraft onwards also featured fixed letter box slots.

In August 1938, during the Certificate of Airworthiness tests at Martlesham Heath, there were concerns about rudder authority, so Tipsy Light Aircraft added 18% to the rudder area, leading to successful certification. At that point, the name of the aircraft changed from Tipsy B to Tipsy Trainer. The ninth aircraft was approved at an increased all up-weight of 1,200 lb (544 kg), and from then on the name was revised to Tipsy Trainer 1.

In all, Tipsy Light Aircraft built eighteen aircraft, all with open cockpits. The last three were completed after the war, the final example first flying in April 1948.

== Operational history ==
The Avions Fairey-built aircraft flew with private owners and club in Belgium, the UK, Sweden, France and Switzerland. In 1937, the prototype had the rare distinction of serving as a tombola prize, but crashed soon afterwards. In 1940, the second machine escaped to England, served with the RAF in the war, and then became the Tipsy Belfair prototype. Many were destroyed during the war, but at least six flew afterwards. The pattern of ownership of the British-built aircraft was similar; one went to India, and later served the RAF there. Twelve of the UK pre-war machines survived the war, although two did not fly again. One post-war machine went to Finland, another to Belgium.

== Variants ==
Tipsy B
Open cockpit initial version
Tipsy Bc
Enclosed cockpit initial version
Tipsy Trainer
UK-built with washout, mass-balanced control surfaces, slots, flaps, single elevator and enlarged rudder
Tipsy Trainer I
As Tipsy Trainer, with increased all-up weight

== Surviving aircraft ==
Three of the UK-built Tipsy Trainers were still flying in 2008/2009: G-AFWR, G-AISB and OO-EOT. One Belgian-built aircraft is a static exhibit in the Svenidos Bil-Och Flygmuseum at Sloinge, Sweden.

== Specifications (Tipsy B) ==
Data from

General characteristics

- Crew: 2
- Length: 6.6 m (21 ft 8 in)
- Wingspan: 9.5 m (31 ft 2 in)
- Height: 1.73 m (5 ft 8 in)
- Wing area: 12 m^{2} (130 sq ft)
- Empty weight: 225 kg (496 lb)
- Max takeoff weight: 450 kg (992 lb)
- Powerplant: 1 × Walter Mikron II 4-cylinder inverted in-line, air-cooled, 46 kW (62 hp)

Performance

- Maximum speed: 200 km/h (120 mph, 110 kn) at sea level
- Cruise speed: 170 km/h (110 mph, 92 kn)
- Range: 725 km (450 mi, 391 nmi)
- Service ceiling: 6,000 m (20,000 ft)
- Rate of climb: 2.283 m/s (449.4 ft/min) to 2,000 m (6,560 ft)
- Wing loading: 31.25 kg/m^{2} (6.40 lb/sq ft)
