= Fairey Primer =

Primer
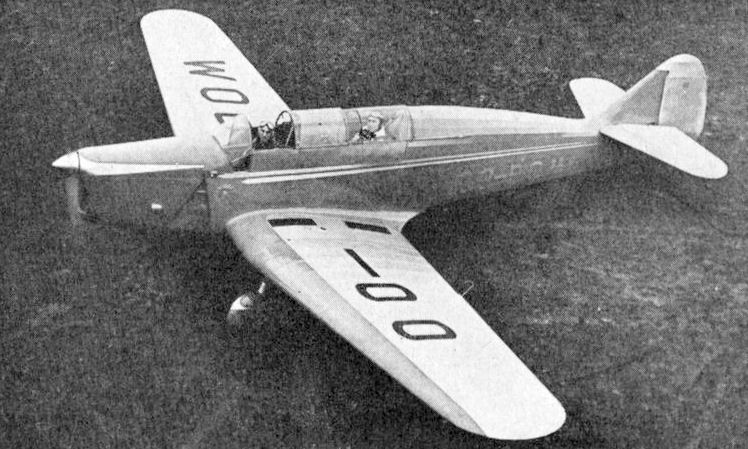
- Avions Fairey Tipsy M

General information
- Type: Basic trainer
- National origin: Belgium
- Manufacturer: Fairey Aviation
- Designer: E.O. Tips
- Number built: 3

History
- First flight: 1938
- Retired: c.1951

The Fairey Primer was a production version of the Avions Fairey Tipsy M tandem seat single-engined basic trainer. Two production aircraft were completed in the late 1940s.

== Development ==
In the 1930s, designer Ernest Oscar Tips of Fairey Aviation's Belgian subsidiary, Avions Fairey produced a series of light aircraft named after him, starting with the Tipsy S. These aircraft were not built by Fairey Aviation. The last to emerge before the Occupation of Belgium in 1940 was the Tipsy M ab initio trainer. Post war, the parent company decided, uniquely to produce this aircraft, calling it the Fairey Primer. Only one Tipsy M had been produced in Belgium and this became the Primer prototype.

The Primer was a conventional single-engined, low-winged monoplane, constructed of welded metal tubes with wood in subsidiary structures like ribs and stringers, all fabric covered. The wings were quite symmetrically tapered and carried manually operated flaps across the centre section. Mild dihedral began outside the centre section. Each mainwheel, equipped with brakes was mounted on a single leg fixed at the end of the centre section. On the prototype the wheels were spatted, but these were removed on production aircraft. There was a small tailwheel below the fin. The rudder was horn balanced and the starboard elevator carried a trim tab.

The enclosed tandem dual control cockpits merged into a raised decking behind them, giving the aircraft a smooth but slightly humped look. Both cockpits were over the wing. The engines used by Primers, the 145 hp (108 kW) de Havilland Gipsy Major 10 and the 155 hp (116 kW) Blackburn Cirrus Major 3 were inverted in-line engines and ran in similar cowlings.

== Operational history ==
The Tipsy M, registered OO-POM and Gipsy powered, first flew at Avions Fairey's works at Gosselies about 1938 and it visited the parent company's works in England in June 1939. The Gosselies factory was destroyed by bombing on 5 May 1940 and at about that time all drawings and jigs for the aircraft were destroyed, deliberately or not. Before the German invasion in May 1940 the machine was taken apart and shipped to England, probably in September or October 1939; certainly it flew from Fairey Aviation's Great West Aerodrome (the site now covered by London Heathrow Airport) for five months after November 1940. It was then used as a company hack until September 1941, when it was put into store. Shortly after the war OO-POM went back to Belgium for small modifications at Fairey's suggestion; they then took over the Tipsy M with the aim of producing it under licence. Early in 1948, it was flying from White Waltham, still bearing its Belgian registration. The following year it received a UK registration (G-AKSX), but seems only to have flown with the experimental number G-6-1. It spent a period of assessment with service pilots at the Aeroplane and Armament Experimental Establishment, Boscombe Down.

When returned from Boscombe Down, the Primer prototype had to be stripped down in order to recreate the lost drawings and jigs. The engine and some other parts were used to build the first production aircraft, though the CAA records G-AKSX as being sold abroad in Aug 1948; whether in flying condition or not is not noted. Fairey had intended to produce a run of ten, but only built two. The first of these, G-ALBL, gained its certificate of airworthiness in October 1948. Initially it had the Gipsy engine but this was later replaced by the Cirrus. It was dismantled in 1949; the CAA records it as destroyed in 1953. The second production aircraft, G-ALEW used this powerplant from the start, and was assessed against the de Havilland Chipmunk at Boscombe Down. The last of the line, it was dismantled in 1951.

== Specifications (Gipsy Major 10) ==
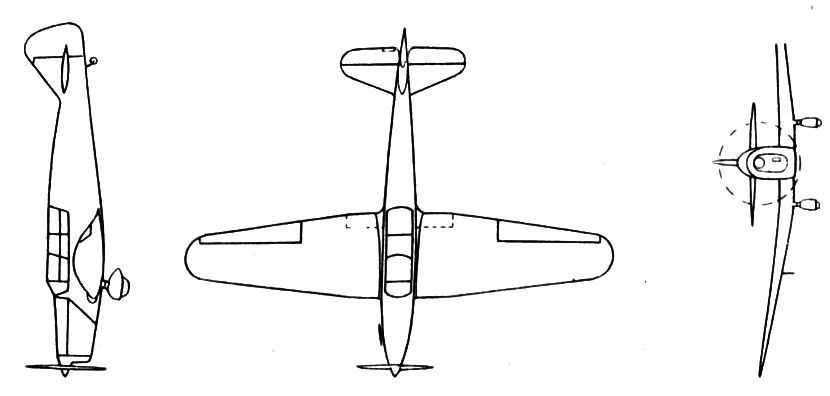
Avions Fairey Tipsy M 3-view drawing from L'Aerophile June 1939

Data from Taylor 1974, pp. 381

General characteristics

- Crew: 2
- Length: 27 ft 6 in (8.38 m)
- Wingspan: 32 ft 10 in (10.0 m)
- Height: 6 ft 10 in (2.08 m)
- Wing area: 154.5 sq ft (14.36 m^{2})
- Empty weight: 1,360 lb (617 kg)
- Gross weight: 1,960 lb (890 kg)
- Powerplant: 1 × de Havilland Gipsy Major 10 air-cooled 4-cylinder inverted inline , 145 hp (108 kW)

Performance

- Maximum speed: 134 mph (215 km/h, 116 kn) at sea level
- Cruise speed: 122 mph (196 km/h, 106 kn) at 2,300 rpm
- Range: 383 mi (616 km, 333 nmi)
- Service ceiling: 19,500 ft (5,900 m)
- Rate of climb: 900 ft/min (4.57 m/s) at sea level
