= Hollis Williams =

British aircraft designer

David Hollis Williams FRAeS (18 February 1900 – 2 April 1974) was a British aircraft designer in the early 1930s for the Fairey Aviation Company, later working for Westland Aircraft.

== Early life ==
He was born in Islington.

== Career ==
=== Royal Air Force ===
He became a pilot officer in the Royal Air Force in November 1923; he flew with the RAF from 1923. He had previously flown as a pilot from 1917 to 1919.

=== Hawker Aircraft ===
In the mid-1920s he worked for Hawker Aircraft in north-east Surrey.

=== Fairey ===
He became chief designer of Fairey in 1930, succeeding Panida Antoni Ralli. In March 1933, he was awarded the Silver Medal of the Royal Aeronautical Society, for work on long range aircraft, when he was assistant chief designer; Sir Roy Fedden received the same honour. In 1938 he became a Fellow of the Royal Aeronautical Society. At Fairey he was largely responsible for the Fairey Long-range Monoplane.

He rejoined Fairey in 1943 as chief engineer.

=== General Aircraft ===
He worked for General Aircraft Limited for nine years as chief engineer from 1934 to 1943, working with Frederick Crocombe, the company's chief designer. Together they designed the ST18 Monospar named 'Croydon' which undertook a record attempt from England to Australia, piloted by Harold 'Tim' Wood. The aircraft suffered a damaged the tail wheel in Karachi enroute and after time spent repairing the wheel they made it to Australia but without breaking the flight time. While there they won the Victoria Air Race. On the return flight the aircraft became lost due to compass problems and bad directional bearings from Darwin and had to make an emergency landing on the Serringapatam reef in the East Timor sea. All 4 crew survived after being picked up by a local fishing boat and returned to England, however the aircraft was submerged by the incoming tide and lost. There are still some remains of the aeroplane on the reef to this day.

=== Westland Aircraft ===
He joined Westland Aircraft in August 1951 as chief engineer, being appointed technical director in 1952. In 1960 he became assistant managing director of Westland. He retired from Westland Aircraft in 1962.

At Westland he led the team that developed the Westland Whirlwind (helicopter), which first flew in August 1953. Westland had already built the Sikorsky H-5 as the Westland WS-51 Dragonfly in 1948. Percival Shunker had been appointed as chief designer of Westland in 1955.

== Personal life ==
In the 1920s and 1930s, he lived on the B467 in Ickenham. He married in 1930. His daughter was born in 1931, and lived on Jersey. His grandson was born in 1954.

His funeral took place in Jersey on 12 April 1974 at 12pm. He had died in Dakar Hospital in Senegal aged 74.

Business positions
| Preceded by Panida Ralli | Chief Designer of the Fairey Aviation Company; 1930 - 1934 | Succeeded by Marcel Lobelle |
| Preceded by Arthur Davenport | Technical Director of Westland Aircraft; 1952 - 1961 | Succeeded by |
