= John Fairey =

English aviator (1935-2009)

John Stephen Fairey
- Born: John Stephen Fairey; 21 April 1935; Iver Heath, Buckinghamshire
- Died: 8 July 2009 (aged 74); Bishop Norton, Lincolnshire
- Cause of death: Aircraft crash
- Spouse: Beverley Halford
- Relatives: Sir Charles Richard Fairey
- Aviation career
- Air force: Rhodesian Air Force
- Rank: Flight lieutenant

John Stephen Fairey FRAeS (21 April 1935 – 8 July 2009) was an English aviator.

== Early life ==
Fairey was the second son of Sir Charles Richard Fairey, founder of the Fairey Aviation Company. He was educated at Eton and Magdalene College, Cambridge.

== Career ==
Fairey gained his pilot licence in Canada, flying seaplanes. While at the University of Cambridge, he joined the Cambridge University Air Squadron and flew de Havilland Canada Chipmunk and North American Harvard aircraft. In the 1960s, Fairey became a pilot with Cambrian Airways, flying Douglas DC-3, Vickers Viscount and BAC One-Eleven aeroplanes.

After emigrating to Rhodesia in 1978, he joined the Rhodesian Air Force, returning to England after the Bush War. He flew with Channel Express until his retirement in 2000.

After his retirement, Fairey continued to fly in displays, particularly in his Spitfire trainer. He later sold this aircraft and commissioned the construction of a Fairey Flycatcher, which is now on show at the Fleet Air Arm Museum.

=== Appointed positions ===
Fairey was chairman of the Museum of Army Flying's Development Trust, vice-president of the Historic Aircraft Association, a fellow of the Royal Aeronautical Society, and a liveryman of the Guild of Air Pilots and Air Navigators. He was also Deputy Lord Lieutenant of Hampshire.

== Death ==
Fairey died on 8 July 2009 when the Percival Provost T1 he was piloting crashed in a field near Bishop Norton in Lincolnshire. The aircraft, which had been on display at RAF Waddington, was based at Brimpton Airfield in Berkshire. He is survived by his daughter, his three sons predeceased him. He also had a second wife, Beverley, née Halford.
