= Fairey Aviation Company =

British aerospace and engineering company (1915–1977)

Fairey Aviation Company Limited
- Industry: Aerospace
- Founded: 1915
- Founder: Charles Richard Fairey
- Defunct: 1960 (aircraft manufacturing)
- Fate: Defunct
- Successor: Westland Aircraft, Spectris, KNDS
- Headquarters: Hayes, Heaton Chapel, Ringway, England
- Key people: Robert Lickley; Marcel Lobelle
- Products: Swordfish; Delta 2; Medium Girder Bridge
- Subsidiaries: Avions Fairey; Fairey Aviation of Canada; Fairey Aviation Company of Australasia; Fairey Air Surveys

The Fairey Aviation Company Limited was a British aircraft manufacturer of the first half of the 20th century based in Hayes in Middlesex and Heaton Chapel and RAF Ringway in Cheshire that designed important military aircraft, including the Fairey III family, the Swordfish, Firefly, and Gannet. It had a strong presence in the supply of naval aircraft, and also built bombers for the RAF.

After the Second World War, the company diversified into mechanical engineering and boat-building. The aircraft manufacturing arm was taken over by Westland Aircraft in 1960. Following a series of mergers and takeovers, the principal successor businesses to the company were FBM Babcock Marine, Spectris, and WFEL (formerly Williams Fairey Engineering Limited).

WFEL was bought by German arms manufacturer Krauss-Maffei Wegmann in 2013 for £60m, and is now called KNDS UK.

== History ==
Founded in 1915 by Charles Richard Fairey (later Sir Richard Fairey) and Belgian engineer Ernest Oscar Tips on their departure from Short Brothers, the company first built under licence or as subcontractor aircraft designed by other manufacturers. (Note: E.g. in 1915 Fairey built 12 Short Admiralty Type 827 seaplanes under subcontract from Short Brothers) The first aircraft designed and built by the Fairey Aviation specifically for use on an aircraft carrier was the Fairey Campania a patrol seaplane that first flew in February 1917. In the third report of the Royal Commission on Awards to Inventors, reported in Flight magazine of 15 January 1925, aviation figures prominently. C. R. Fairey and the Fairey Aviation Co. Ltd, was awarded £4,000 for work on the Hamble Baby seaplane.

Fairey subsequently designed many aircraft types and, after World War II, missiles.

The Propeller Division (Fairey-Reed Airscrews) was located at the Hayes factory, and used designs based on the patents of Sylvanus Albert Reed. C. R. Fairey first encountered Reed's products in the mid-1920s when investigating the possibilities of the Curtiss D-12 engine. The Curtiss company also manufactured propellers designed by Reed. Another example of utilising the talents of independent designers was the use of flaps, designed by Robert Talbot Youngman (Note: In 1934 R. T. Youngman succeeded Mr. Hollis Williams as head of the technical department.) (Fairey-Youngman flaps) which gave many of the Fairey aircraft and those of other manufacturers improved manoeuvrability.

Aircraft production was primarily at the factory in North Hyde Road, Hayes (Middlesex), with flight testing carried out at Northolt Aerodrome (1917–1929), Great West Aerodrome (1930–1944), Heston Airport (1944–1947), and finally at White Waltham (1947–1964). Losing the Great West Aerodrome in 1944 by requisition by the Air Ministry to build London Heathrow Airport, with no compensation until 1964, caused a severe financial shock which may have hastened the company's end.

One notable Hayes-built aircraft type during the late 1930s and World War II was the Swordfish. In 1957, the prototype Fairey Rotodyne vertical takeoff airliner was built at Hayes. After the merger with Westland Helicopters, helicopters such as the Westland Wasp and Westland Scout were built at Hayes in the 1960s.

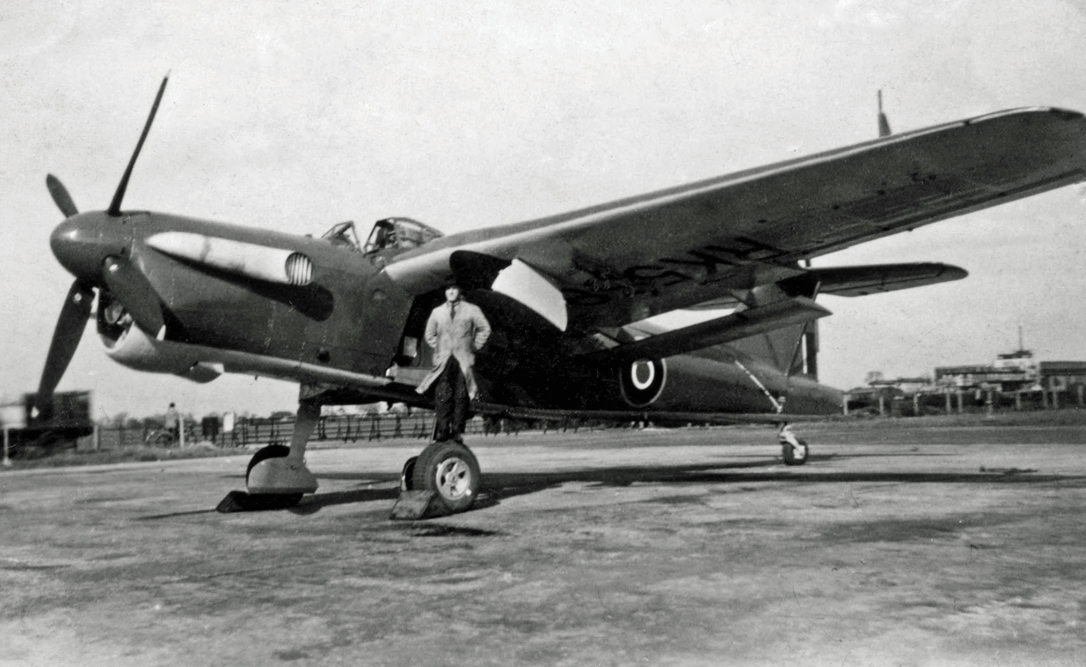
Stockport/Ringway-built Fairey Barracuda TF.V at Manchester Airport in May 1946

Receipt of large UK military contracts in the mid-1930s necessitated acquisition of a large factory in Heaton Chapel Stockport in 1935 that had been used as the National Aircraft Factory No. 2 during World War I. Flight test facilities were built at Manchester's Ringway Airport, the first phase opening in June 1937. A few Hendon monoplane bombers built at Stockport were flown from Manchester's Barton Aerodrome in 1936. Quantity production of Battle light bombers at Stockport/Ringway commenced in mid 1937. Large numbers of Fulmar fighters and Barracuda dive-bombers followed during World War II. Fairey's also built 498 Bristol Beaufighter aircraft and over 660 Handley Page Halifax bombers in their northern facilities. Postwar, Firefly and Gannet naval aircraft were supplemented by sub-contracts from de Havilland for Vampire and Venom jet fighters. Aircraft production and modification at Stockport and Ringway ceased in 1960.

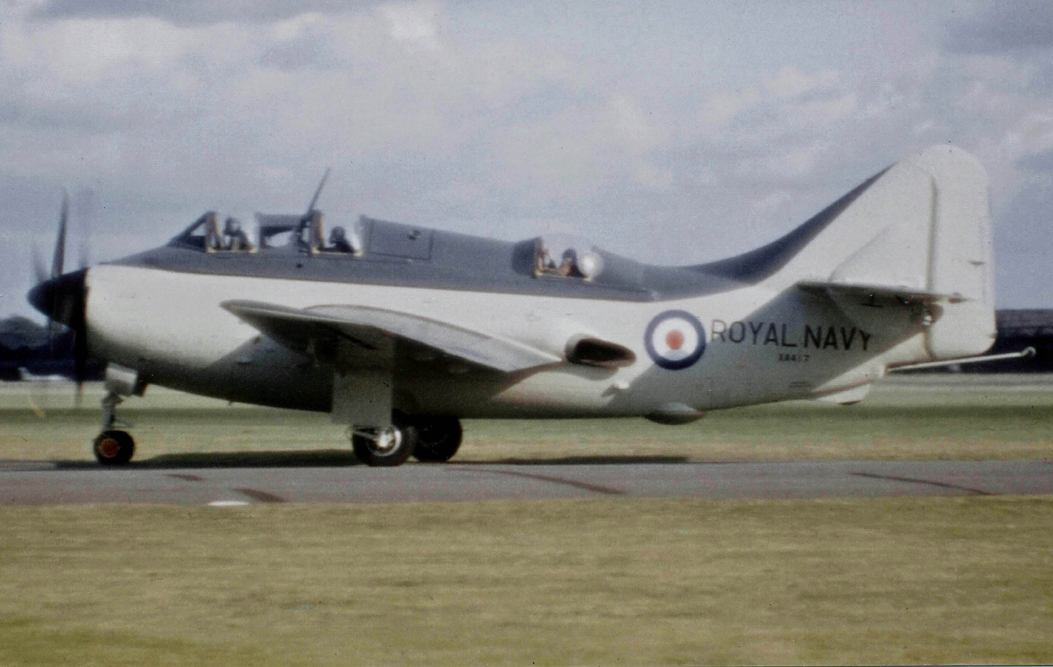
Fairey Stockport/Ringway-built Gannet AS.4 in 1956

On 13 March 1959 Flight reported that Fairey Aviation Ltd was to be reorganised following a proposal to concentrate aircraft and allied manufacturing activities in the United Kingdom into a new wholly owned subsidiary called the Fairey Aviation Co. Ltd. The Board felt that the change, taking effect on 1 April 1959, would enable the Rotodyne and other aircraft work to be handled by a concern concentrating on aviation. It is proposed to change the company's name to the Fairey Co. Ltd, and to concentrate general engineering activities in the Stockport Aviation Co. Ltd, whose name would become Fairey Engineering Ltd. Under these changes, the Fairey Co. would become a holding company, with control of policy and finance throughout the group.

The government in the late 1950s was determined to rationalise the UK's aero industry. The Ministry of Defence saw the future of helicopters as being best met by a single manufacturer. (Note: Which was not the sole factor for a merger; there are other factors that brevity requires not be discussed here.) The merger of Fairey's aviation interests with Westland Aircraft took place in early 1960 shortly after Westland had acquired the Saunders-Roe group and the helicopter division of the Bristol Aeroplane Company. Westland Aircraft and the Fairey Company announced that they had reached agreement for the sale by Fairey to Westland of the issued share capital of Fairey Aviation, which operated all Fairey's UK aviation interests. Westland acquired all Fairey's aircraft manufacturing business (including the Gannet AEW.3) and Fairey's 10% investment in the Aircraft Manufacturing Company (Airco) Fairey's workforce employed on manufacture of the outer wings of the Airco D.H.121. (later to be the HS 121 Trident) was transferred to Westland. Fairey received 2,000,000 Westland shares of 5 shillings each and a cash payment of approximately £1.4m. The sale did not include Fairey Air Surveys or the works at Heston which was home to the weapon division, which had a contract for research into advanced anti-tank missile systems. Fairey's remaining net worth was approximately £9.5m.

=== The collapse of the Fairey Group ===
In 1977 the Fairey Group went into receivership and was effectively nationalised by the government. Fairey went into liquidation when it introduced a Britten-Norman Islander production line into its subsidiary company, Avions Fairey, and overproduced the plane and subsequently faced redundancy payments of about £16 million in Belgium. The companies involved were as follows:

- Fairey Hydraulics Ltd, Heston, Hydraulic power controls and filters for aircraft; sold in 1999 to a management buyout, the name changed to Claverham, bought in 2001 by Hamilton Sundstrand.
- Fairey Engineering Ltd, Stockport, General, and nuclear engineering;
- Fairey Nuclear Ltd, Heston, Nuclear components and light engineering; see also Dungeness nuclear power station
- Fairey Industrial Products Ltd, Heston, Management company;
- Fairey Filtration Ltd, Heston, Industrial filters;
- Fairey Winches Ltd, Tavistock, Vehicle overdrives, winches, and hubs;
- Jerguson Tress Gauge and Valve Co Ltd, Newcastle, Liquid Level indicators;
- The Tress Engineering Co Ltd, Newcastle, Petrochemical valves;
- Fairey Marine Holdings Ltd, Hamble, Management company;
- Fairey Marine (East Cowes) Ltd, East Cowes, Ship, and boat building;
- Fairey Exhibitions Ltd, Hamble, Exhibition stand contractors;
- Fairey Marine Ltd, Hamble, Boatbuilding and repair;
- Fairey Yacht Harbours Ltd, Hamble, Boat handling, berthing, and storage;
- Fairey Surveys Ltd, Maidenhead, Aerial and geophysical survey and mapping;
- Fairey Surveys (Scotland) Ltd, Livingston, Aerial and geophysical survey and mapping;
- Fairey Developments Ltd, Heston, Management company:

The Fairey Britten-Norman Aircraft Company was taken over by Pilatus, then a subsidiary of the Oerlikon group in Switzerland.

The rescue action was taken by the Government under section 8 of the Industry Act 1972 acquiring from the official receiver of the Fairey Company Ltd the entire share capital for £201,163,000. The companies were managed by the National Enterprise Board (NEB). In 1980 The Fairey Group was purchased by Doulton & Co., part of S Pearson & Son, from the NEB. At the time, Pearson's interests in manufacturing were concentrated in the Doulton fine china business. The engineering interests were strengthened in 1980 by the acquisition of the high technology businesses of Fairey, and their merging with Pearson's other engineering interests in 1982. However, these businesses were disposed of in 1986 as part of Pearson wishing to concentrate on core activities; acquired by Williams Holdings they became Williams Fairey Engineering Ltd and then WFEL Ltd.

Other parts of the combined Fairey – Doulton group saw a management buy-out from Pearson, listing on the London Stock Exchange in 1988. During the 1990s this company concentrated on expanding its electronics business, acquiring a number of companies, and disposing of the electrical insulator and hydraulic actuator businesses. In 1997, the company acquired Burnfield, of which Malvern Instruments was the most significant company. Servomex plc was acquired in 1999. In July 2000, the acquisition of the four instrumentation and controls businesses of Spectris AG of Germany for £171m was the largest ever made by the company and marked an important strategic addition to the company's instrumentation and controls business. The reshaping of the group was marked with the change of name from Fairey Group to Spectris in May 2001.

== Subsidiary companies ==
=== Avions Fairey ===
On 27 August 1931, Avions Fairey SA was founded by Fairey engineer Ernest Oscar Tips. Fairey aircraft had impressed the Belgian authorities and a subsidiary, Avions Fairey was established to produce Fairey aircraft in Belgium The company staff left Belgium ahead of the German invasion of the Low Countries and returned after the war to build aircraft under licence for the Belgian Air Force. With Fairey's financial troubles in the later 1970s, the Belgian government bought Avions Fairey to preserve its involvement in the Belgian F-16 project. See also Tipsy Nipper.

=== Fairey Aviation of Canada ===
Formed in 1948 the Fairey Aviation Company of Canada Limited and grew from a six-man operation to a major enterprise employing around a thousand people. In March 1949, the company undertook repair and overhaul work for the Royal Canadian Navy on the Supermarine Seafire and the Fairey Firefly and later the Hawker Sea Fury and also undertook modification work on the Grumman Avenger. The Avro Lancaster conversion programme created the need for plant expansion. The Lancaster was followed in service by the Lockheed Neptune and again the company undertook a share of the repair overhaul and service of these aircraft. The company was engaged in the modification and overhaul of the McDonnell Banshee.

Fairey of Canada also developed a component and instrument design and manufacturing organisation. The company began manufacture of Hydro Booster Units which control flight surfaces hydraulically rather than manually. Other flight controls were designed and manufactured for the Avro CF-100. The Canadair Argus used Fairey-designed hydraulic actuators. The company also produced the "Bear Trap" helicopter /ship handling system for the Royal Canadian Navy. In the early 1960s the company undertook the conversion of the Martin Mars flying boats to water-bearing firefighters.

Drawing on the parent company's expertise in the design of hydraulic equipment led to local manufacturer of the Fairey Microfilter, which had applications in industries beyond aviation. Yet another Fairey designed and manufactured component was the Safety Ohmmeter. This instrument had many applications in missiles, mining, quarrying and similar fields. The company was appointed agent for RFD Inflatable Marine Survival Equipment. This agency included sales, service inspection and repair of inflatable liferafts.

The West Coast Branch of the Fairey Aviation Company of Canada Limited was formed in 1955 at Sidney, Vancouver Island. The plant was located at Patricia Bay Airport. This facility handled mainly repair, overhaul and modification of military and civil aircraft including the conversion of ex-military Avenger aircraft to commercial cropdusting roles. Additionally, the company diversified into designing and manufacturing items of hospital equipment.

Following the failure of the UK parent, Fairey Canada was acquired by IMP Group International.

=== Fairey Aviation Company of Australasia ===
The Australian branch of Fairey Aviation was formed in 1948 as Fairey-Clyde Aviation Co Pty. Ltd, a joint venture with Clyde Engineering and incorporated the aircraft division of CEC. The name was changed in November 1951. Based in Bankstown, Sydney, the factory overhauled aircraft for the Royal Australian Air Force and Royal Australian Navy, converted RAN Firefly AS.5s to Trainer Mark 5 standard. The Special Projects Division built the Jindivik, Meteor, and Canberra drones at Woomera missile test range. Fairey Australasia was the first company to be established at the Weapons Research Establishment (WRE). This was in 1949 when the firm was involved in supporting research trials of the scale model of the Fairey vertical-take-off aircraft. Shortly afterwards the company expanded to manufacture the RTV.l research rockets that were fired in Australia. From this developed a design and production factory that specialised in the manufacture of airborne and ground equipment for target aircraft and missile fields including the Tonic towed target, which can be carried and streamed by a Jindivik 3A.

In 1957 a miniature camera by the name of WRECISS (Weapons Research Establishment camera interception single-shot) was designed and developed by the WRE at Woomera and manufactured by the Fairey Aviation Co of Australasia, at Salisbury, South Australia. In most surface-to-air missile installations the cameras have been mounted in the nose telemetry bay. Although the firing lever must be replaced after each mission, it is estimated that some 30 per cent of the WRECISS can be re-used without repairs and a substantial further proportion can be repaired relatively cheaply. Its film was Ilford Photo SR101 in the form of 0.93in discs punched from 35 mm strip; weight 801; diameter 1.5in; length 1.25in; field of view 186 deg; exposure time 0.3 millisecond; effective relative aperture, approximately f/8. One hundred and ninety-two cameras were made in the initial production run. In 1988 this company was merged into AWA Defence Industries of Australia.

=== Aerial Survey ===
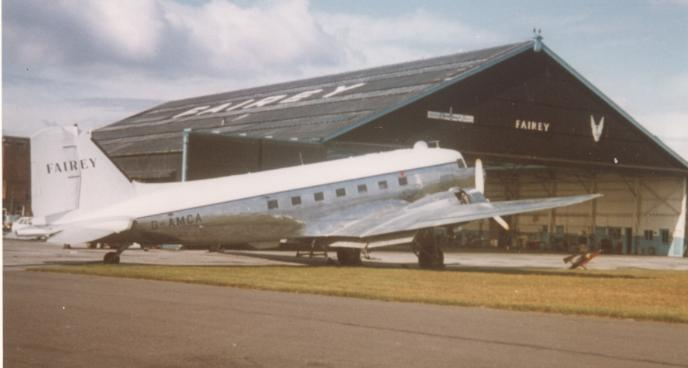
Fairey Air Surveys Douglas DC-3 outside Fairey's 1937-built hangar at Manchester Airport during servicing in 1975

Fairey Air Surveys, Ltd, was initially headquartered at 24 Bruton Street, London W1. and later at Reform Road, Maidenhead, with companies across the world. The aircraft (Douglas Dakotas) and technical offices were based at White Waltham, Berks, along with a special research laboratory. Here the company undertook the design and development of anti-vibration isolators which were incorporated into camera mountings. Both mapping and geophysical work was undertaken. The UK based aircraft were sent out to work all over the world. The company undertook aerial surveys for local authorities within the UK and for many overseas Governments. Maps were also published under the Fairey-Falcon imprint. Over the years the companies names were changed to reflect Fairey ownership and operated into the late 1970s, later becoming Clyde Surveying Services Ltd. Fairey Surveys was absorbed into what eventually became Blom Aerofilms. Subsidiary companies were as follows:—

- Fairey Surveys (Scotland), Livingston, Aerial and geophysical survey and mapping.
- Aero Surveys, Vancouver International Airport, Canada. This company was equipped to handle processing and mapping. Aircraft included two Ansons and one P-38. Operated in partnership with Fairchild Aerial Surveys, Inc.
- Air Survey Company of India, Dum Dum Airport, Calcutta. This branch was fully equipped for processing and mapping. Aircraft included a DC-3 and three DH Rapides (known in 1946 as the Indian Air Survey & Transport Limited).
- Air Survey Company of Pakistan, Dunolly Road, Karachi, 2. This was an office only and no aircraft or ground equipment were permanently based there.
- Air Survey Company of Rhodesia, Salisbury, Southern Rhodesia. Fully equipped for processing and mapping. An Anson or a Dove from the UK fleet was available for operations.

Other companies were located in Nigeria, Zambia and the Republic of Ireland.

== Engineering ==
=== Heaton Chapel ===
The Fairey factory at Heaton Chapel, Stockport can trace its roots back to when Crossley Brothers having had by the end of 1916 supplied large numbers of tenders and aero engines to the Royal Flying Corps acquired premises at High Lane, Heaton Chapel to expand production. In 1917, following the Government's decision to build three National Aircraft Factories was taken, Crossley Motors was formed to manage National Aircraft Factory No.2 as it was known. The factory continued to produce aircraft until November 1918. After the First World War the site switched to vehicle production. The factory was taken over by Willys-Knight and Overland Motors for the manufacture of cars and commercial vehicles and retained by them until 30 November 1934 when it was acquired by Fairey. In 1935 the Fairey company received a substantial order for Hendon night bombers and established production lines at the Heaton Chapel factory. The production facilities at Heaton Chapel were incorporated as the Stockport Aviation Company Limited on 11 February 1936 and the Company took a site at Ringway (now Manchester Airport), where test flights were carried out.

After the end of aircraft production the Heaton Chapel works became Fairey Engineering Ltd and began production of medium and heavy engineering including portable bridges for military and emergency services use, notably the Medium Girder Bridge. Its bridges are in service with the British Army, U.S. Army and many other NATO forces. Fairey Engineering Ltd also made Nuclear Reactor cores and fuelling machines for Dungeness B and Trawsfynydd.

The company became Williams Fairey Engineering in 1986, and was then taken over by the Kidde portion of the American United Technologies Corporation. in 2000, and became now known as WFEL Ltd. In 2006 the Manchester Evening News reported that private equity investors Dunedin Capital Partners backed a management buy-out of WFEL from UTC which employs 160 people at its factory on Crossley Road, Heaton Chapel.

=== Land Rover hubs and overdrives ===
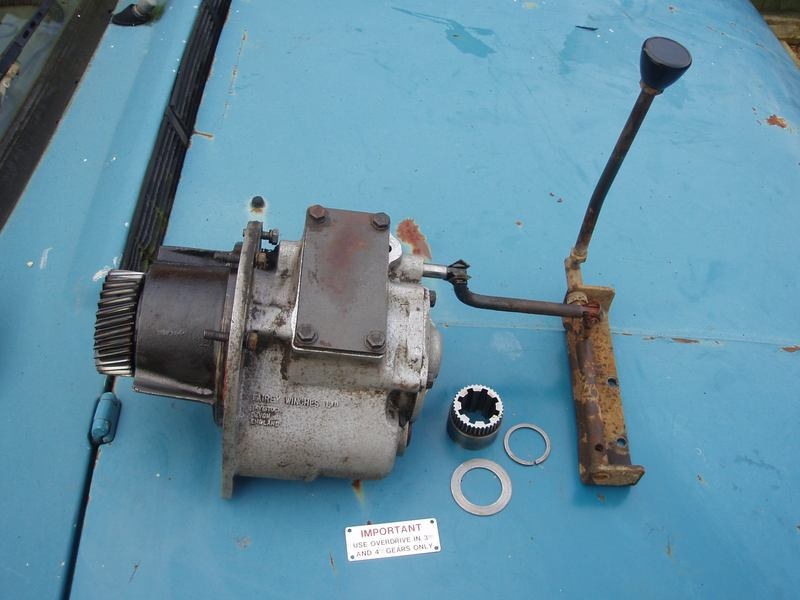
A Fairey mechanical overdrive, as fitted to an early Range Rover

In the post-war period, from the late 1950s onwards, Fairey acquired Mayflower Automotive Products, including their factory in Tavistock, Devon, and with it the designs of its products, including winch and free-wheeling front hubs for Land Rover vehicles. By the 1970s Fairey was manufacturing a wide range of winches, covering mechanical, hydraulic and electric drive and capstan/drum configurations. Fairey winches formed the bulk of the manufacturer-approved winch options for Land Rover throughout the 1970s and early 1980s.

In 1975 Fairey designed and manufactured a mechanical overdrive unit for Land Rovers. Vehicles fitted with the unit carried a badge on the rear saying "Overdrive by Fairey", with the Fairey logo (see above).

This branch of products effectively ceased in the early 1980s when new product development at Land Rover and a trend for manufacturers to build accessories in-house forced Fairey to drop out of the sector. The American company Superwinch bought the Tavistock works and continued making Fairey-designed winches for a few years. The site was Superwinch's European base and manufacturing facility until its closure in 2019, when the US parent company ceased operations and the key assets were sold to the Westin company in San Dimas, California.

== Aircraft ==
=== Fairey aircraft ===
Year of first flight in brackets

- Fairey Hamble Baby – patrol floatplane, 1917
- Fairey F.2 – three-seat fighter (1917)
- Fairey Campania – carrier-based patrol/reconnaissance biplane (1917)
- Fairey III – reconnaissance biplane (1917)
- Fairey N.9 – experimental floatplane (1917)
- Fairey Pintail – floatplane fighter (1920)
- Fairey Flycatcher – biplane fighter (1922)
- Fairey N.4 – long-range reconnaissance flying boat (1923)
- Fairey Fawn – two-seat light bomber (1923)
- Fairey Fremantle – long range seaplane (1924)
- Fairey Firefly I – biplane fighter (1925)
- Fairey Ferret – two-seat general purpose biplane (1925)
- Fairey Fox – biplane bomber (1925)
- Fairey Long-range Monoplane – experimental aircraft (1928)
- Fairey Firefly IIM – biplane fighter (1929)
- Fairey Fleetwing – carrier-based reconnaissance biplane (1929)
- Fairey Seal – carrier-based spotter-reconnaissance (1930)
- Fairey Hendon – monoplane heavy night bomber (1930)
- Fairey Gordon – light bomber, utility biplane (1931)
- Fairey G.4/31 – general purpose biplane (1934)
- Fairey S.9/30 – fleet spotter/reconnaissance biplane (1934)
- Fairey Swordfish – biplane torpedo bomber (1934)
- Fairey Fantôme – single-seat fighter prototype (1935)
- Fairey Battle – light bomber (1936)
- Fairey Seafox – reconnaissance floatplane (1936)
- Fairey P.4/34 – light bomber (1937)
- Fairey Albacore – carrier-borne biplane torpedo bomber (1938)
- Fairey FC1 - four-engine airliner project to Spec. 15/38, 1938
- Fairey Fulmar – carrier-borne fighter (1940)
- Fairey Barracuda – carrier-borne dive bomber/torpedo bomber (1940)
- Fairey Firefly – carrier-borne fighter (1941)
- Fairey Spearfish – torpedo bomber/dive bomber (1945)
- Fairey FB-1 Gyrodyne – gyrodyne (1947)
- Fairey Primer – trainer (1948)
- Fairey Gannet – carrier-borne ASW (later AEW) aircraft (1949)
- Fairey F.D.1 – experimental delta wing (1951)
- Fairey F.D.2 – record-setting delta-wing (1954)
- Fairey Jet Gyrodyne – compound gyroplane (1954)
- Fairey Ultra-light Helicopter (1955)
- Fairey Rotodyne – autogyro/compound helicopter (1957)
- Fairey Gannet AEW.3 – carrier-borne AEW aircraft (1958)

=== Avions Fairey aircraft ===
- Avions Fairey Belfair
- Avions Fairey Junior
- Tipsy B
- Tipsy S.2
- Tipsy Nipper

=== Subcontract production ===
As well as producing their own designs, Fairey produced other aircraft under subcontract.

- Short Admiralty Type 827 (12)
- Sopwith 1½ Strutter (100)

During the Second World War, Fairey produced nearly 500 Bristol Beaufighters and nearly 600 Handley Page Halifax(326 B Mk III and 246 B Mk V) Post war they held subcontracts for production of the de Havilland Vampire, and its successor the de Havilland Venom.

== Aircraft engines ==
Fairey imported 50 Curtiss built D-12 engines in 1926, renaming them the Fairey Felix.

- Fairey Felix
- Fairey Prince (V-12)
- Fairey Prince (H-16) Prince – 16-cylinder 1,500 hp (1,100 kW)
- Fairey Monarch – 2 x 12 cylinders (two engines with one propshaft passing through the other) 2,250 hp. The P-24 flew in 1939 but was cancelled during the war.

== Missiles and drones ==
Fairey's interest in missile production had been kept separate from the Fairey Aviation Co Ltd and its subsequent absorption into the Westland Group in 1960. Production was therefore invested in Fairey Engineering Ltd but by 1962 this had been transformed into a 50/50 joint venture with the British Aircraft Corporation (Holdings) Ltd known as BAC (AT) LTD, with offices at 100 Pall Mall, London SW1 and a share capital of £100. This was separate to the BAC Guided Weapons division.

The Fairey company was also involved in the early development of pilotless aircraft which led to the development of radio controlled pilotless target aircraft in Britain and the United States in the 1930s. In 1931, the Fairey "Queen" radio-controlled target was developed, building a batch of three. The Queen was a modified Fairey IIIF floatplane, (a catapult launched aircraft which was used for reconnaissance by the Royal Navy). Apart from installing radio gear the Queen also had some aerodynamic modifications to improve stability, however the first couple of pilotless flights came to quick endings as the drones crashed as soon as they left the catapult launcher on HMS Valiant.

In 1960, Fairey announced an agreement between Fairey Engineering Ltd and the Del Mar Engineering Laboratories, Los Angeles, California, to distribute a range of subsonic and supersonic towed target systems (RADOP) for air-to-air and surface-to-air guided weapon training in Europe, Africa, the Middle East, the Commonwealth and the UK.

The parent Fairey Company and its Australian subsidiary were heavily involved in guided weapon development. The Weapon Division of Fairey Engineering Ltd was responsible in the UK for the Jindivik Mk 2B Pilotless target aircraft. This had a Bristol Siddeley Viper ASV.8 turbojet, giving a speed of 600 mph (970 km/h) and an operational ceiling in excess of 50,000 ft.

The "Fairey V.T.O" was a vertical take-off delta wing aircraft was designed to explore the possibility of making an aircraft launched from short ramps with low acceleration. Shown for the first time at the Society of British Aircraft Constructors (SBAC) Show in 1952, the Fairey VTO Project was used to test the basic configuration of future research craft. Each wing had a large aileron and the vertical fin carried a large rudder. The V.T.O. obtained 900 lbf (4.0 kN) thrust from each Beta nozzle and, for launching, used two solid-fuel boosters of 600 lbf (2.7 kN) each, bringing the total thrust up to 3,000 lbf (13 kN)—obviously more than the total weight. The Beta I rocket had two jets, one of which could be swivelled laterally and the other vertically, according to signals from an autopilot. The resulting mean thrust line could thus be varied to maintain controlled flight at low airspeeds. Fairey carried out many successful tests, the first of which was from a ship in Cardigan Bay in 1949.

Fairey Rocket Test Vehicle 1, formerly known as LOPGAP ("Liquid Oxygen and Petrol Guided Anti-Aircraft Projectile"). The original design can be traced back to the 1944 Royal Navy specification for a guided anti-aircraft missile known as LOPGAP. In 1947, the Royal Aircraft Establishment took over development work and the missile was renamed RTV1. Several versions of the basic RTV1 were developed.

The Fairey Aviation Company of Australasia Pty Ltd was awarded a contract to build 40 RTV1e rockets. The first of which were completed in early 1954. Components were built by the Royal Australian Navy Torpedo Establishment (hydraulic servo units), EMI (guidance receivers and amplifiers) and the Commonwealth Aircraft Corporation (magnesium castings). Some parts were also imported from the UK. Assembly was undertaken at Salisbury, South Australia by the Special Projects Division of Fairey. Test firings took place in 1955–56 but by this time the RTV1 was considered obsolete RTV1e was the beam guidance test vehicle. Radar guidance was provided by a radar unit which projected a narrow beam. Different versions of the test vehicle were created and each was concerned with a different aspect of control, guidance, propulsion and aerodynamics of the complete rocket. The RTV 1e was a two-stage liquid fuel rocket used for research and development into problems associated with beam riding missiles. It was fired at an angle of 35 degrees with a maximum altitude of about 12,000 feet. The vehicle was launched by seven solid booster rockets which had a burn time of four seconds, after which the liquid fuel sustainer motor took over.

At the 1954 Farnborough Airshow, Fairey Australia displayed a massive missile resembling the RTV-1. The base was formed by a booster unit about 6 ft high and 20 inches in diameter, stabilised by four large and four small fins and housing seven five-inch motors. The main body was about 17 ft in length with a diameter of 10 in. The body was fitted with four wings and four small control vanes.

Fairey Australia also displayed an aerodynamic test vehicle, described as a "three-inch winged round". This was a simple projectile, without guidance, to aid investigations into the properties of various wing/body assemblies at high supersonic speeds. The example shown was about 6 ft long, and had a finely finished, white-painted body apparently made of seamless tube. About two-thirds of the way back from the nose was fitted a laminated-wood wing of about two feet span, positioned across a diameter of the body, with a root chord of some 18 inches and a quarter-chord sweep of about 50 degrees.

In April 1947 Fairey released details of its first guided missile It was an anti-aircraft weapon designed for use in the Pacific War but not completed in time for use by the British Army (who originally ordered it) or for the Royal Navy. The Ministry of Supply requested that the work be completed, and the Stooge was the outcome. It had a length of 7 ft 5.5 in (2.273 m), a span of 6 ft 10 in (2.08 m), a body diameter of 17 in, and weighing 738 lb (335 kg), with a warhead. Propulsion was by four 75 lbf (330 N)-thrust solid-fuel main rockets, but initially four additional booster rockets delivering further 5,600 lb thrust accelerated the Stooge off its 10 ft (3.0 m) long launching ramp. Unlike later designs, the Stooge was intended for high subsonic speeds—and limited ranges. The Stooge consisted of two-stage propulsion, an autopilot, radio control equipment with additional ground unit, and a warhead. The Stooge required a launching ramp and transport. The missile was extensively tested at Woomera.

The Malkara missile was designed in Australia by British and Australian companies. It was a heavy wire-guided missile for deployment from vehicles, light naval craft and fixed emplacements. This weapon replaced the Fairey "Orange William" project for the MoS which would later lead to Swingfire. Fairey Engineering had the sales agency for all countries outside the US, and was also appointed by the Australian Department of Supply's to assist in the introduction of the Malkara to operational service and to design and produce modifications. The missile was in service with the Royal Armoured Corps, deployed on a special vehicle—the Humber Hornet, made by Wharton Engineering—which carried two rounds on launchers and two rounds stowed. The Hornet could be air-dropped, had a crew of three. For training purposes the Malkara Mk I was used, with a range of some 2,000 m (6,600 ft). The operational weapon was the Malkara Mk 1 A, which had a different type of tracking flare, thinner guidance wire, and other improvements to give approximately double the range of Mk 1.

The Fairey Fireflash was an early air-to-air weapon guided by radar beam riding. Developed as "Blue Sky" – a derated version of the Red Hawk missile. It was in service briefly before being replaced by the de Havilland Firestreak.

Green Cheese was a tactical nuclear anti-ship missile for use with the Gannet. Problems with Gannet led to continued development with the Blackburn Buccaneer but it was cancelled.

== Fairey Marine ==
Fairey Marine was established in the late 1940s by Sir Richard Fairey and Fairey Aviation's Managing Director, Mr Chichester-Smith. Both were avid sailing enthusiasts. Utilising techniques developed in the aircraft industry during WWII both men decided that they should produce sailing dinghies and so recruited Charles Currey to help run the company when he came out of the Navy. In the following years, thousands of dinghies were produced by Fairey Marine including the Firefly, Albacore, Falcon, Swordfish, Jollyboat, Flying Fifteen, 505 and International 14's along with the much smaller Dinky and Duckling. Later on in the 1950s they produced the larger sailing cruisers, the Atalanta (named after Sir Richard's first son's wife), Titania, Fulmar and the 27-foot (8.2 m) Fisherman motor sailer (based on the Fairey Lifeboat hull) along with the 15 Cinderella (outboard runabout) and the 16'6" Faun (outboard powered family cruiser).

== Fairey Band ==
In 1937, workers at the Fairey aviation plant formed a brass band. For some sixty years the band was associated with the company and its successors, although the Fairey Band has now had to turn to external sources for financial backing. Throughout its history though the band has retained its identity with the company under guises as the Fairey Aviation Works Band, Williams Fairey Band and later Fairey (FP Music) Band. The band has recently returned to roots, rebranding as just The Fairey Band. The Fairey Band has won many national and international titles throughout its proud history.

== See also ==
- Aerospace industry in the United Kingdom
