= Pandia Ralli =

British aircraft designer (1888–1930)

Pandia Antonio Ralli (28 June 1888 - 17 April 1930) was a British aircraft designer in the 1920s for the Fairey Aviation Company, he was responsible for the thin-bladed metal airscrews used by the Supermarine S.5 which won the 1927 Schneider Trophy and the Supermarine S.6 which won the trophy outright in 1929.

== Early life ==
Ralli was born on the 28 June 1888 the only son of Antonio Pandi Ralli, educated at the Gymnase Scientifique of Lausanne. With a diploma as an electrical engineer and training in advanced mathematics and physics he joined Fairey Aviation in 1916 and apart from a time between 1918 and 1929 worked for the firm until his death.

In 1927 for his work on metal air screws for the Supermarine Schneider Trophy aircraft he was awarded the Royal Aeronautical Society silver medal.

As the Chief Technical Engineer he was also responsible for the design of the Fairey Long-range Monoplane which achieved a non-stop flight between England and India in little over 48 hours.

He died on 17 April 1930 aged 41 at a Nursing Home in Ealing.
