= Gordon Dove =

1930s British monoplane

Gove

General information
- Type: Single seat sports ultralight aircraft
- National origin: United Kingdom
- Manufacturer: Premier Aircraft Construction Ltd
- Designer: S.C. Buszard
- Number built: 3

History
- First flight: 3 March 1937

The Gordon Dove was a British low powered, low wing single seat monoplane, built for the ultralight sports market in competition with aircraft like the Belgian designed Tipsy S. There was little enthusiasm for such machines in England in the late 1930s and only three were constructed.

== Design and development ==
In 1935 Mervyn Chadwick and Raymond Gordon had come together to develop the then popular Flying Flea or other low powered aircraft suited to a predicted market in low cost, single seat flying. The appearance in England of the single seat Tipsy S in the following summer suggested that a low winged cantilever monoplane might be more popular and safer, so they set out to produce an aircraft along the same lines. This became the Gordon Dove, built by Chadwick and Gordon's Premier Aircraft Constructions Ltd, formed in November 1936. Though some commentators have described this as "plagiarism" from the Tipsy, it was significantly different from its inspiration and easily distinguished when seen in the air, in plan view.

The wings of the Dove were strongly tapered to a narrow tip, though the straight leading edge was only slightly swept. Wide span ailerons covered much of the straight, forward swept, trailing edge. The wing was built around a main wooden box spar transversely braced to a subsidiary rear spar and plywood covered from the latter forward. Behind this rear spar the wing was fabric covered. The outer panels were readily detachable for transport. The wide track undercarriage had a single vertical long travel leg on each side to the main spar, with a small bracing strut forward. The first two of the three Doves built had their wheels enclosed in spats, with unfaired legs, but the third used trouser fairings.

The fuselage was a rectangular plywood covered structure, slender in plan. A 28 hp (21 kW) Aero Engines Sprite, an air-cooled flat twin engine, was mounted on steel bearers and well streamlined. The single cockpit was over the wing, with a baggage compartment aft. The Dove was offered with an enclosed Coupé cockpit cover. The tail unit was built of fabric covered wood. Both horizontal and vertical surfaces were heavily revised for the third aircraft, though on all three, all control surfaces were horn balanced. The early machines had tailplanes which were strut braced to the top of the fin, with a straight leading edge of modest sweep and carrying generous, curved elevators. The fin was sharply triangular, but the rudder extended the leading edge line, was curved at the rear and ended above the elevators. On the third Dove the bracing was abandoned, the leading edge sweep increased and the elevators decreased in chord and made straight edged. Its vertical surfaces were altered to produce a more conventional shape, the rudder projecting less above the fin but continuing downwards between the elevators to the fuselage bottom.

The Dove G-AETU first flew on 3 March 1937 from Maylands Aerodrome, Romford, with C. Oscroft at the controls. It was rapidly advertised for sale at £225, a price that included a flying course to pilot's licence standard at the Romford Flying Club (RFC), an organisation in which Chadwick and Gordon had financial interests. Alternatively, a kit of parts was offered at £165, though no kits were sold. The first aircraft was sold to RFC and a production line of seven aircraft was planned, though only two were built. Premier Aircraft Constructions went into Receivership in August 1938. The Dove's failure to sell was at least partly due to the lack of interest in England in single seat sports aircraft, particularly underpowered ones, an attitude that also led to the rapid abandonment of the production under licence of the Tipsy S. which had inspired the Dove. The second Dove was scrapped in May 1939 after being offered for sale complete at £90 and the first was destroyed in a fire in February 1940. The third aircraft was damaged in a forced landing in September 1937, after just two weeks of flight and was kept in store awaiting repair whilst efforts were made to sell it as found.

== Specifications (first two aircraft) ==
Data from Grey & Bridgman 1972, pp. 43c

General characteristics

- Crew: 1
- Length: 18 ft 3 in (5.56 m)
- Wingspan: 27 ft 3 in (8.31 m)
- Height: 5 ft 8 in (1.73 m)
- Wing area: 112 sq ft (10.4 m^{2})
- Empty weight: 382 lb (173 kg)
- Gross weight: 1,323 lb (600 kg)
- Powerplant: 1 × Aero Engines Sprite air cooled flat twin, 28 hp (21 kW)

Performance

- Maximum speed: 95 mph (153 km/h, 83 kn)
- Cruise speed: 85 mph (137 km/h, 74 kn)
- Range: 400 mi (640 km, 350 nmi)
- Rate of climb: 800 ft/min (4.1 m/s) initial
- Wing loading: 5.4 lb/sq ft (26 kg/m^{2})
