= Avions Fairey Junior =

Belgian single-seat light aircraft

Tipsy Junior
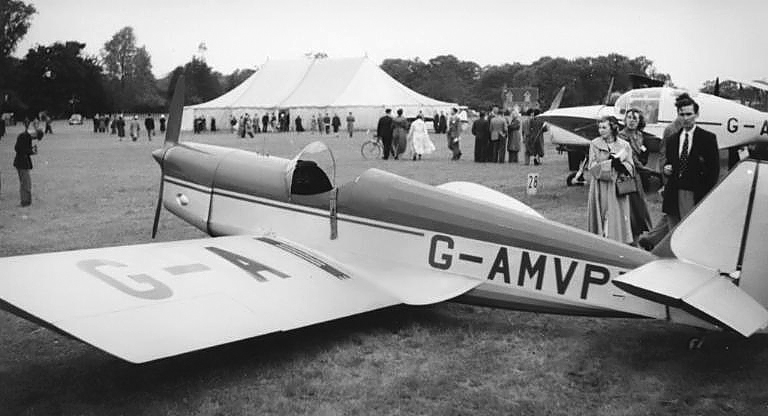
- Tipsy Junior G-AMVP at a UK airshow in 1953

General information
- Type: Sports plane
- Manufacturer: Avions Fairey
- Designer: Ernest Oscar Tips
- Number built: 2

History
- First flight: 30 June 1947

The Avions Fairey Junior, also known as the Tipsy Junior, was a single-seat light aircraft built in Belgium following World War II.

== Development ==
The Junior was one of a series of light aircraft designed by and named after E.O.Tips of Fairey Aviation's Belgian subsidiary, Avions Fairey. Of wood and fabric construction, it was a conventional, low-wing monoplane with a tailwheel undercarriage and a single seat, open cockpit, though there was the option of a bubble hood. The constant chord wings were almost square ended and the tailplane, fin and rudder also angular. Both completed aircraft were initially powered by the 36 hp (27 kW) Aeronca JAP J-99 engine, later replaced by the more powerful, 62 hp (46 kW) Walter Mikron 2.

The Junior, registered OO-TIT, flew for the first time on 30 June 1947 from Gosselies in Belgium.

== Operational history ==
The first Junior was written off after a hard landing in 1948.

The second example (construction number J.111, registration OO-ULA) was bought by Fairey and taken to England in 1953, where it was registered as G-AMVP. In 1957, it was used in a publicity stunt when Fairey test pilot Peter Twiss landed it on the aircraft carrier HMS Ark Royal. For part of its time it had the bubble canopy. Rebuilt after a long time in storage following a forced landing in 1993, it flew again late in 2006. It had a minor landing accident in 2008 but had a permit to fly until May 2009.

The Junior did not sell, and the third airframe was cancelled before completion. It was purchased incomplete by Fairey in 1961 and has been under construction in the hands of a number of owners in the intervening years, but never finished.

== Specifications ==
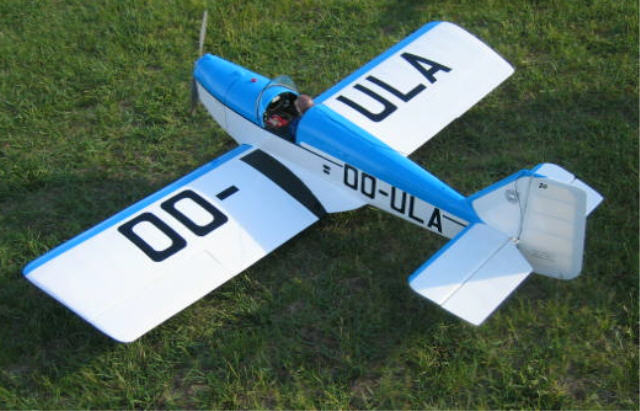
Flying scale model of Avions Fairey Tipsy Junior, built by Donald Granlund

Data from British Civil Aircraft 1919-59 Vol.II.

General characteristics

- Crew: 1
- Length: 5.65 m (18 ft 6 in)
- Wingspan: 6.9 m (22 ft 8 in)
- Height: 1.48 m (4 ft 10 in)
- Wing area: 10.5 m^{2} (113 sq ft)
- Empty weight: 220 kg (485 lb)
- Gross weight: 350 kg (772 lb)
- Powerplant: 1 × Walter Mikron II 4-cylinder air-cooled inverted in-line piston engine, 46 kW (62 hp)
- Propellers: 2-bladed fixed pitch propeller

Performance

- Maximum speed: 174 km/h (108 mph, 94 kn)
- Cruise speed: 158 km/h (98 mph, 85 kn)
- Range: 430 km (270 mi, 230 nmi)
- Service ceiling: 1,800 m (5,900 ft)
