= Avions Fairey =

- Industry: Aircraft manufacture
- Founder: Richard Fairey
- Headquarters: Charleroi, Belgium
- Key people: Marcel Lobelle, Ernest Oscar Tips
- Products: Aircraft

Avions Fairey was the Belgian-based subsidiary of the British Fairey Aviation that built aircraft for the Belgian government. It subsequently separated from the UK parent and became SONACA.

== History ==
In the late 1920s, the Aéronautique Militaire (Belgian Air Force) set out to replace its old aircraft. Accordingly, Belgian officers attended the Hendon Air Display where they saw a Fairey Firefly and met Fairey staff. The Firefly toured Belgian air bases in 1930 and met with approval from pilots. This led to a contract for 12 UK-built Firefly II to be followed by a further 33 aircraft built in Belgium.

Fairey already had a number of Belgians in key roles in the company; Ernest Oscar Tips and Marcel Lobelle had joined during the First World War. Tips went to Belgium to set up the subsidiary company. He based the new company near Charleroi. The fighter ace Fernand Jacquet who operated a flying school nearby joined the company in 1931.

Avions Fairey received further orders for Fireflies followed by Fairey Foxes which would be the main aircraft of the Belgian Air Force; being used as a fighter, bomber and training aircraft.

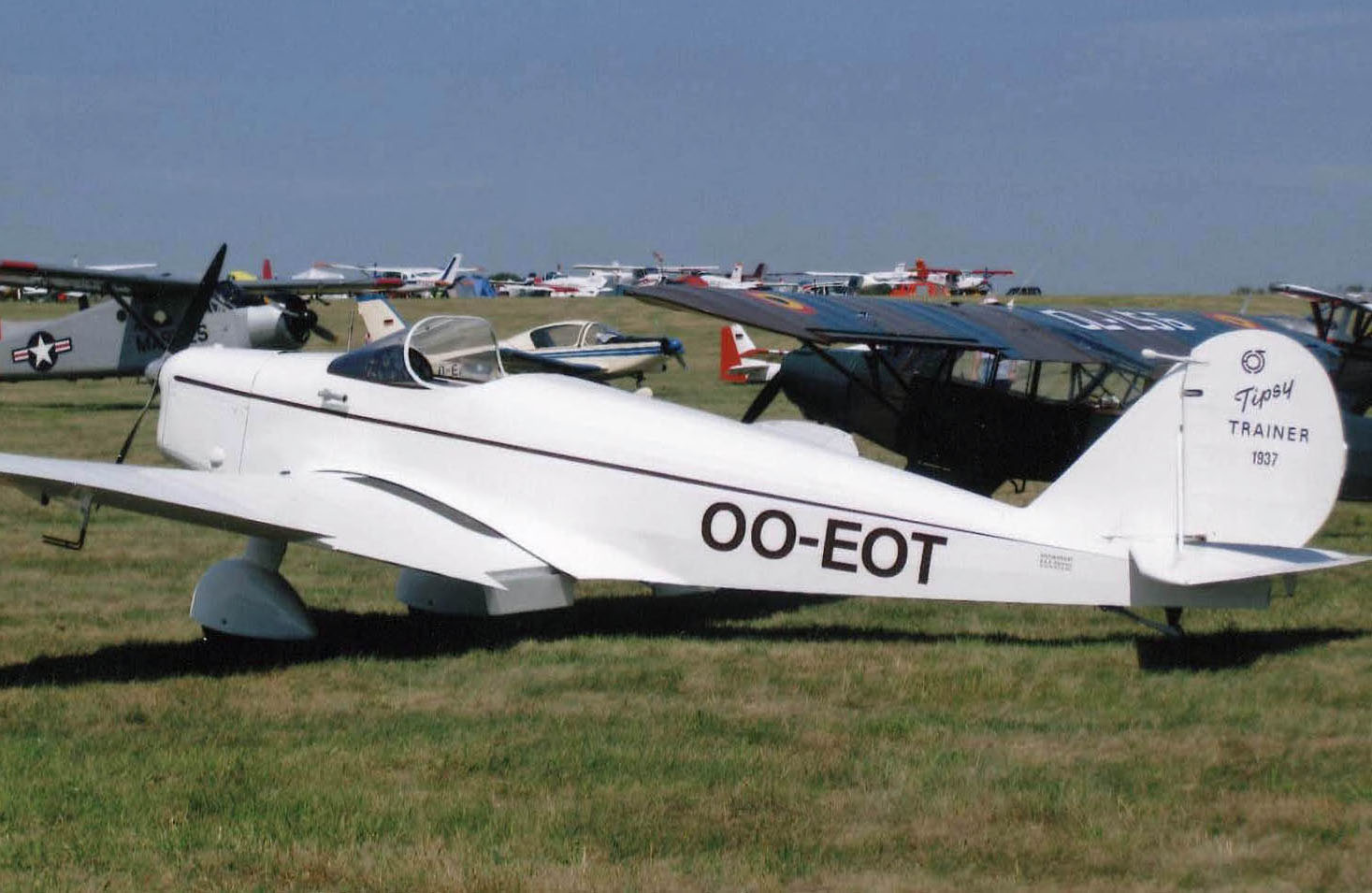
Tipsy B OO-EOT (in 2009) Note the initials of the designer (E.O.Tips) feature in the registration.

E.O. Tips designed a number of light civil aircraft at Avions Fairey; the "Tipsy" family of aircraft. After the 1933 16 hp (12 kW) Tipsy, came the S2 with a more powerful 32 hp (24 kW) engine. The Tipsy B was a side-by-side seat training aircraft. A tandem trainer was the Tipsy M designed for the Belgian Air Force but overlooked for the SV4b. Tipsy series was successful and licence rights for production were sold in the UK and South Africa.

Most Avions Fairey work was on military contracts. The contact with the Belgian military led to Fairey developing the Fairey Fantôme as a followup to the Firefly for the Belgians. Of the three prototypes, two ended up in Spain (via the USSR) the third as a test aircraft with the RAF.

Although they ordered 12 Fairey Battles in 1936 to replace the Fox, no further orders came until an order for Hawker Hurricanes to be built in Belgium. However, on 10 May 1940, the factory was heavily bombed by the Germans.

The company personnel evacuated to France, and then left for England. Their ship was sunk by German bombers outside St Nazaire and eight Fairey staff were killed; the survivors worked for the parent company during the Second World War.

== Post-war ==
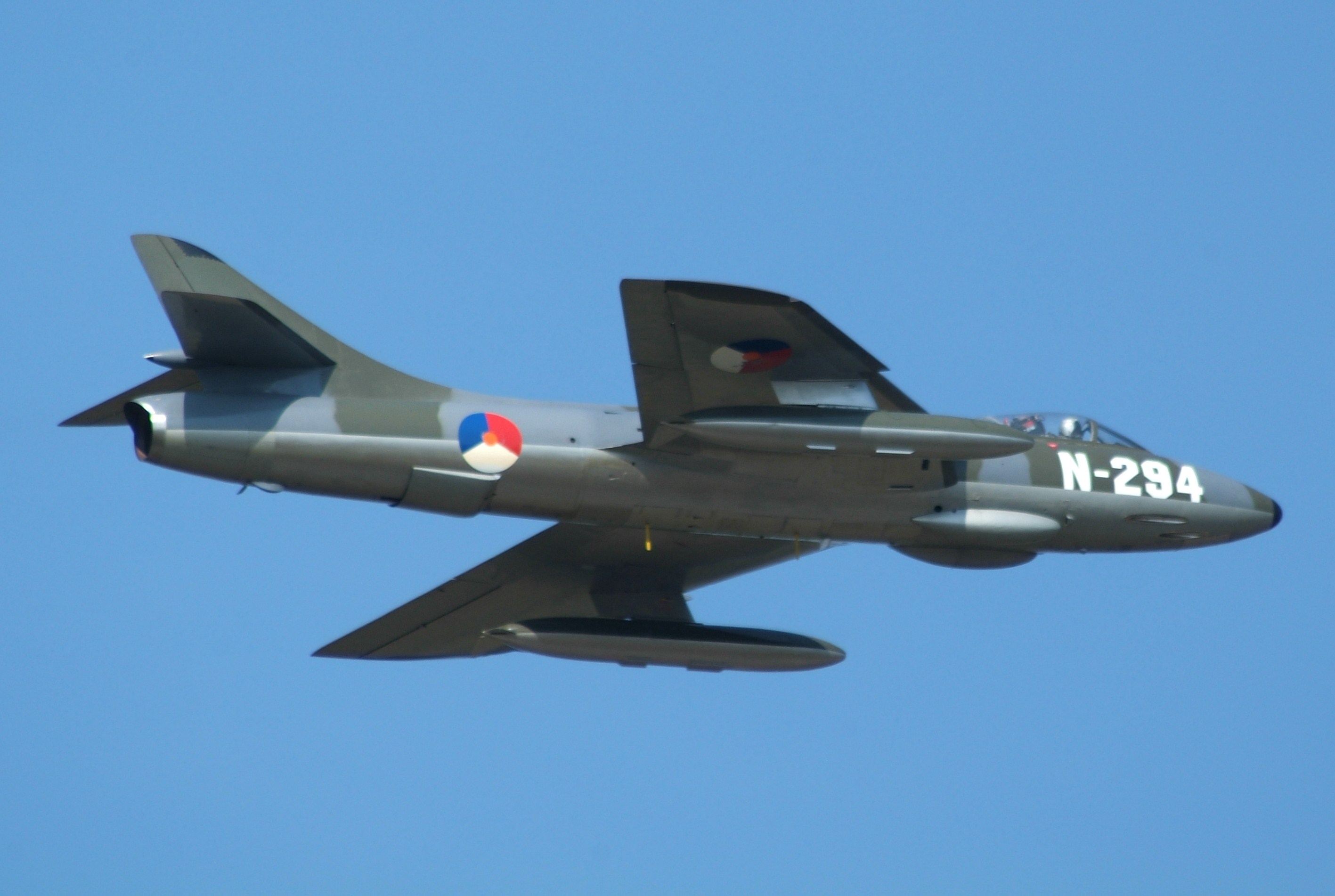
Hawker Hunter F.6A painted with Dutch AF markings

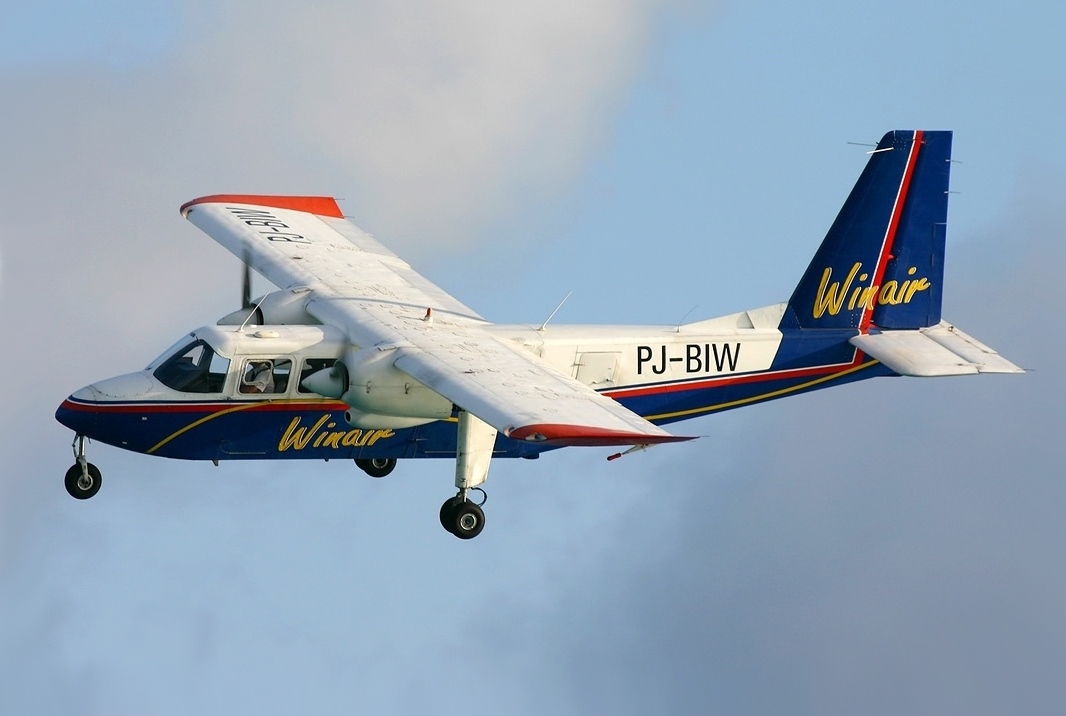
Britten-Norman BN-2A Islander

After the war, Avions Fairey restarted at Gosselies airfield near Charleroi by servicing C-47 Skytrains of the Air Force; this was then extended to other aircraft.

Avions Fairey returned to production as a joint venture with Fokker to build Gloster Meteor jet fighters: 240 were built between the companies for the Dutch and Belgian air forces.

Tipsy development continued; the Tipsy Junior single seater followed by the Tipsy Belfair. Sales were poor due to a glut of ex-military aircraft. In 1957 the Tipsy Nipper which was a very low cost aircraft was produced either assembled or in kit form.

In 1953, Avions Fairey was contracted to produce 256 Hawker Hunter fuselages for the Dutch and Belgian air Force. This lasted until 1958. Avions Fairey continued in service contracts and, in conjunction with SABCA, built Lockheed F-104 Starfighters under licence from 1962.

After Fairey UK bought the Britten-Norman company, their Islanders were built in Belgium and Romania and a Trislander production line started in Belgium. Islanders built in Romania continued to be ferried to Britten-Norman for finishing flight certification as did all aircraft built in Belgium. Fairey UK had its own financial difficulties and the Belgian government took over Avions Fairey in order to preserve the Belgian F-16 project.

On 1 June 1976, the SONACA company was created from Avions Fairey.
