= Fairey Hydraulics =

Aircraft flight control manufacturer

Fairey Hydraulics was a main aircraft flight control system manufacturer of the UK, originally part of Fairey, and now a division of UTC. It made the flight actuation system for the Panavia Tornado, the first fly-by-wire military production aircraft, and the Harrier.

== History ==
The company had been a division of Fairey Engineering Limited, but due to expansion, a separate company was formed on 1 April 1965. Most of Fairey Engineering was the nuclear division, which had built nuclear power stations. The industrial division became Fairey Industrial Hydraulics Limited in 1969. Fairey Filtration was later formed.

It opened the Lickley Engineering Centre in 1982.

It was known as Fairey Hydraulics Limited until January 1998, then briefly known as FHL

=== Ownership ===
The parent company Fairey was bought by Westland Aircraft in 1972. The company was sold by Fairey in January 1998 for £55m. Fairey left aviation at this point, concentrating on electronics and filtration.

It was bought by UTC on 21 December 2000, which became UTC Aerospace Systems in 2012.

== Products ==
By 1965 it had over 4,000 foreign and Commonwealth aircraft fitted with its control systems.

The Panavia Tornado was the world's first military aircraft with fly-by-wire control, in service, which was developed by Fairey Hydraulics: it made the spoiler, rudder and taileron actuator for the Tornado.

It had worked on the Harrier right from the start in 1967, and would work on it throughout. It built the filtration system of Concorde. It made the yaw control system fitted to the rudder actuator of the Hawk.

Fairey Hydraulics developed the deck lock system for helicopters in high winds, also known as Talon; the system involves hydraulic actuators.

== Structure ==
Fairey Hydraulics was on Cranford Lane in Heston. From September 1990, it moved its London operations to its North Somerset site (Claverham, Bristol) over eighteen months, closing the Middlesex site. Also on the Middlesex site was Fairey Nuclear and Fairey Arlon.

Fairey Hydraulics had already moved and closed down its site based in Kingswood, Bristol around 1989

UTC Aerospace Systems sold off the site in May 2017, when it employed around 400 people.

== See also ==
- British Fluid Power Association
- Graviner, also bought by UTC
- Microtecnica of Italy
