= Charles Richard Fairey =

English aircraft manufacturer

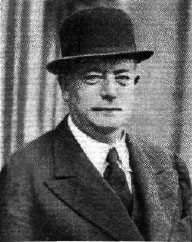
- C.R. Fairey, 1936
- Born: 5 May 1887; Hendon, Middlesex, England
- Died: 30 September 1956 (aged 69); London, England
- Occupation: Aircraft manufacturer
- Children: John Fairey
- Engineering career
- Institutions: Fairey Aviation Company

Sir Charles Richard Fairey MBE FRAeS (5 May 1887 – 30 September 1956), also known as Richard Fairey, was an English aircraft manufacturer.

== Early life ==
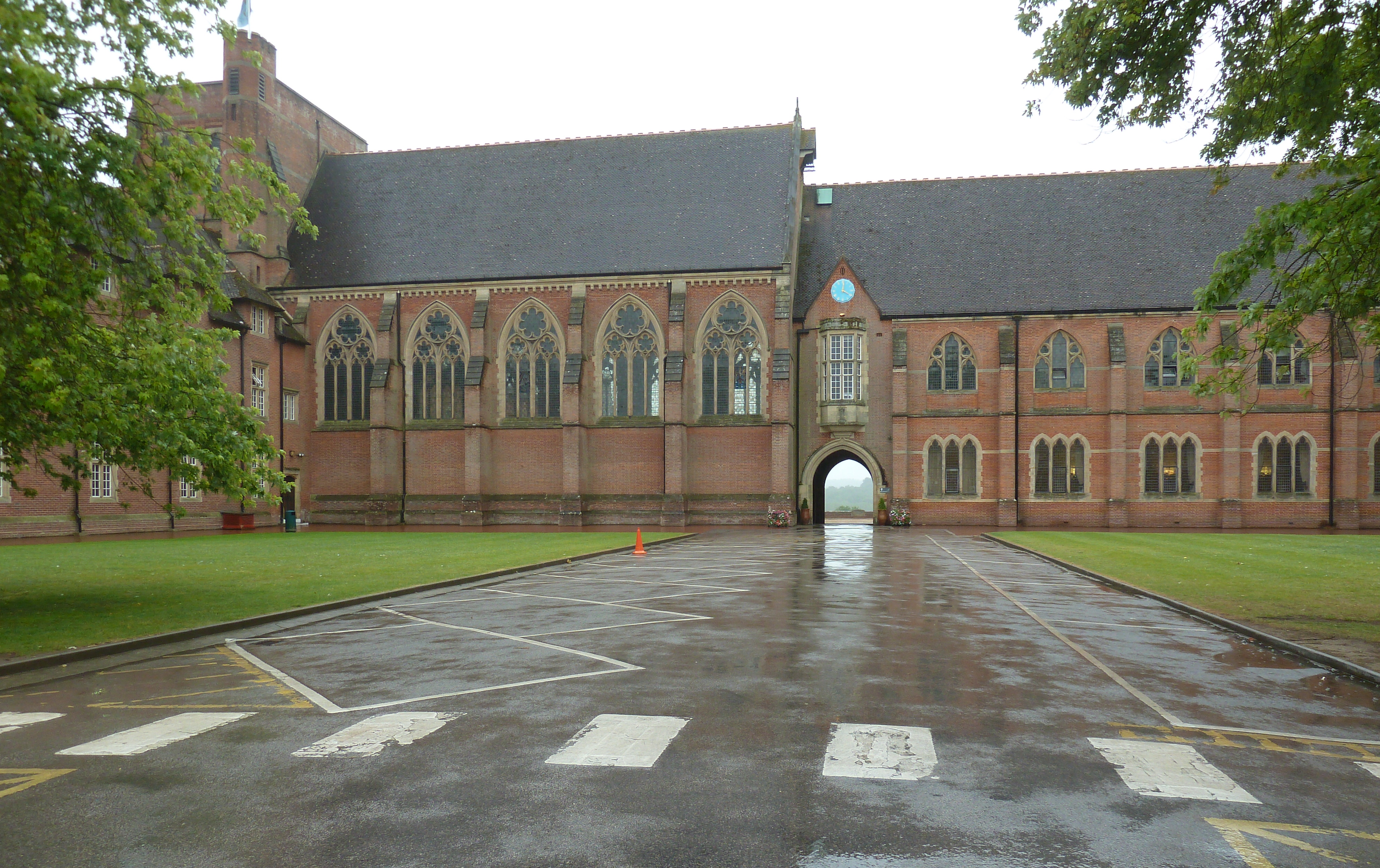
Ardingly College

Charles Fairey was born on 5 May 1887 in Hendon, Middlesex and educated at the Merchant Taylors' School, Northwood and Ardingly College, and later as an apprentice at the Finsbury Technical College where he studied City & Guilds courses in electrical engineering and chemistry. Fairey's father had died when he was aged 11, and although from a middle-class background, this dramatic change in the family's circumstances led to Fairey taking a job, aged 15, with the Jandus Electric Company of London, which manufactured arc lamps. His progress was such that he was able to take charge of the installation of electric lights at Heysham docks whilst still in his teens. His next job was as an analytical chemist, working on boiler-feed and fuel problems at Municipal Borough of Finchley power station. Fairey became a skilled designer and builder of model aeroplanes and active member of the Kite and Model Aeroplane Association. On 4 June 1910 (aged 23) Fairey entered a model flying competition at Crystal Palace, London. His model monoplane design won 1st prize in the Longest Flight and Stability Competition with a distance of 153yds 1 ft 10in. His success in aeroplane modelling helped establish his reputation as a craftsman and innovator.

== Career ==
In 1911, Fairey, aged 24, became General manager with the Blair Atholl Syndicate Ltd., a company formed to develop the tailless aircraft designed by J. W. Dunne, at Eastchurch, Isle of Sheppey.

In 1913, Fairey joined Short Brothers as chief engineer and in 1915, he formed his own company, Fairey Aviation. At the outbreak of the First World War, he attempted to join first the Royal Naval Air Service and then the Royal Flying Corps, but was refused by both on medical grounds and by reason of his skill as an aeronautical engineer. A year later, at the age of 28, he formed his own aircraft company. It started with an office in Piccadilly, and factory space was found initially in The Gramophone company's facilities at Hayes.

His standing in the United Kingdom aircraft industry led him to be the chairman of the Society of British Aircraft Constructors in 1922–1924 and president of the Royal Aeronautical Society in 1930–31 and 1932–33.

His company developed a new factory at Hayes just across the Great Western Railway. In 1930, a 150-acre (0.61 km^{2}) flying field was developed on land purchased from the church under the control of the vicar of Harmondsworth, Middlesex. Known as the Great West Aerodrome, it was later compulsorily purchased by the Crown during World War II, and today forms the south-eastern part of Heathrow Airport, London. Soon afterwards, a seaplane base was established at Hamble. He also gave his private yacht to the Royal Navy for the duration of the war. Armed and refitted, she served on anti-submarine duties as HMS Evadne.

During the forty years he led his business, Fairey was involved with the development of many of his companies' most important products, including aircraft, rotorcraft, marine craft, mechanical engineering and rocketry. He remained in charge of his company until his death in a London nursing home early on 30 September 1956, after suffering from a heart condition for several years.

He served as Commodore of the Royal London Yacht Club from 1936 to 1950.

== Honours ==
- MBE in 1920.
- President of the Royal Aeronautical Society, twice, 1930–31 and 1932–33.
- The Council of the Royal Aeronautical Society awarded, on 21 April 1936, the Sir Charles Wakefield Gold Medal to Mr. C. R. Fairey, for his work on the development of aircraft flaps.
- Knighthood CENTRAL CHANCERY OF THE ORDERS OF KNIGHTHOOD, St. James's Palace, S.W.I, 11 June 1942. The KING has been graciously pleased, on the occasion of the Celebration of His Majesty's Birthday, to signify his intention of conferring the Honour of Knighthood upon Charles Richard Fairey, Esq., M.B.E.,' F.R.Ae.S., Chairman, Fairey Aviation Company. Director-General, British Air Commission, Washington.
- Medal of Freedom with silver palm from the United States government. The Medal was presented to Sir Richard Fairey in 1948. The award was made at Kindley Field airbase, Bermuda, in recognition of Sir Richard's co-operation with the U.S. War Department, which contributed to the planning of U.S. aircraft research and development, while he was Director-General of the British Air Commission in Washington D.C. during the war. Col. Thomas D. Ferguson, the commanding officer of Kindley Field, made the presentation for the U.S. War Department.

== Bibliography ==
- Sherwood, Philip. 1999. Heathrow: 2000 years of History ISBN 0-7509-2132-3
- Sherwood, Tim. 1999. Coming in to Land: A Short History of Hounslow, Hanworth and Heston Aerodromes 1911–1946. Heritage Publications (Hounslow Library) ISBN 1-899144-30-7
- Taylor, H.A. (1974). Fairey Aircraft since 1915. Putnam & Co. Ltd. ISBN 0-370-00065-X.
- Hall, G W (13 March 1959). "A Pioneer Remembered". Flight: 374.
- Oxford Dictionary of National Biography: Fairey, Charles Richard by J.L. Pritchard.

Professional and academic associations
Preceded by	President of the Royal Aeronautical Society; 1930–31	Succeeded by
Preceded by	President of the Royal Aeronautical Society; 1932–33	Succeeded by
