= Ernest Oscar Tips =

Belgian aircraft designer

- Born: 2 October 1893; Tielrode
- Died: March 10, 1978 (aged 84); Brussels
- Known for: Avions Fairey

Ernest Oscar Tips (born 2 October 1893 in Tielrode, died 10 March 1978 in Brussels) was a Belgian aircraft designer, who co-founded the Fairey Aviation Company in 1915 and its Belgian subsidiary Avions Fairey in 1931.

== Biography ==
=== Early days ===
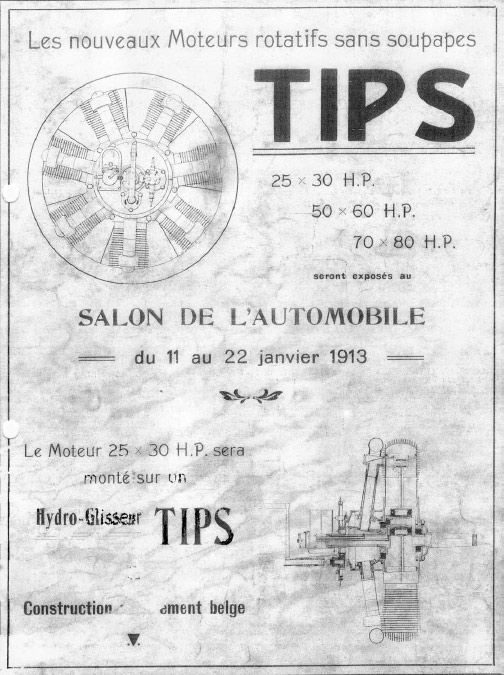
The Tips brothers introducing the valve-less motors at the 1913 Salon de l'Automobile.

Born in Tielrode near Temse in 1893, the youngest of 13 children. His family was active in building mechanical systems such as bicycles. He studied at the Institut St Willebrord, but moved to Brussels at 14 years old to live with his brother after his father had died.

E.O. Tips was already building aircraft ("avion Canard") in 1908, with his brother Maurice. In 1909, they had built a biplane with a rotor. Together, they acquired the licence of the Gnome engine for Belgium and the Netherlands.

He fled Belgium at the outbreak of World War I, arriving in England via the (neutral) Netherlands. He learned aeronautical engineering at Short Brothers, and was the first employee of the newly established Fairey Aviation Company that he cofounded in Hayes, Middlesex. In 1917, he released the ship-borne Campania. He was a close friend to Dick Fairey and the Fairey family.

He gained British pilot's license RAC-UK 5904 on May 6, 1918.

=== Avions Fairey ===
In 1931, he returned to Belgium to create Fairey's Belgian subsidiary Avions Fairey at the Gosselies airfield. Avions Fairey stands at the cornerstone of Belgium's development of its modern aeronautic industry, the government of Belgium had to negotiate with its UK counterpart to develop the Fairey operations in the flat land. Avions Fairey was created in September 1931 (or 1928) when its UK headquarters sold 25 Firefly II to the Belgian army.

Fernand Jacquet joined the company. In 1933, he assembled the first Tipsy S, powered by a Douglas Sprite 16HP. 19 units of the following model, the S2, were sold. The Tipsy M was a hit and its conception was close to those of modern fighters.

Approaching World War II, E.O. Tips organized the company's evacuation to the UK through Saint-Nazaire, France. Tips lost the company's supply at sea, but managed to reach the UK where he held a managing position (Chief Experimental Engineer and Chief Research Engineer of the new helicopter department) at Fairey Aviation. When he returned to Gosselies after the war, the airfield and its buildings had been destroyed. By 1946, E.O. Tips and the team completed the reconstruction of the Gosselies Fairey airfield.

After the war, Tips' two sons joined the company. In 1946, they designed the Tipsy Junior. E.O. Tips he designed the Tipsy Belfair, which held the record for longest distance flight in 1950 (945 km for a -500 kg aircraft) and 1955 (2632 km, same category). In 1953, Avions Fairey received an order of 256 fuselages for the Dutch and Belgian Air Force (as part of the industrial "hunter Program").

In 1955, he became affiliated with the Vieilles Tiges de Belgique.

In 1957, E.O. Tips launched his last aircraft model, the Tipsy Nipper, a light one-seat aircraft that E.O. Tips compared to the "Volkswagen of planes". 62 Tipsy Nipper were produced before E.O. Tips sold the engineering rights when he retired in March 1960.

=== Vieilles Tiges de Belgique ===
From 1968 to 1975, he managed Vieilles Tiges de Belgique (vice-President from 1969 to 1972).

He died in his home on 10 March 1978.

== Designs ==
- Tipsy S
- Tipsy B
- Tipsy M
- Tipsy Belfair
- Tipsy Junior
- Tipsy Nipper

== Places named after him ==
- (street) Rue Ernest-Oscar Tips, Charleroi, Belgium
