= Fairey Fantôme =

Fantôme
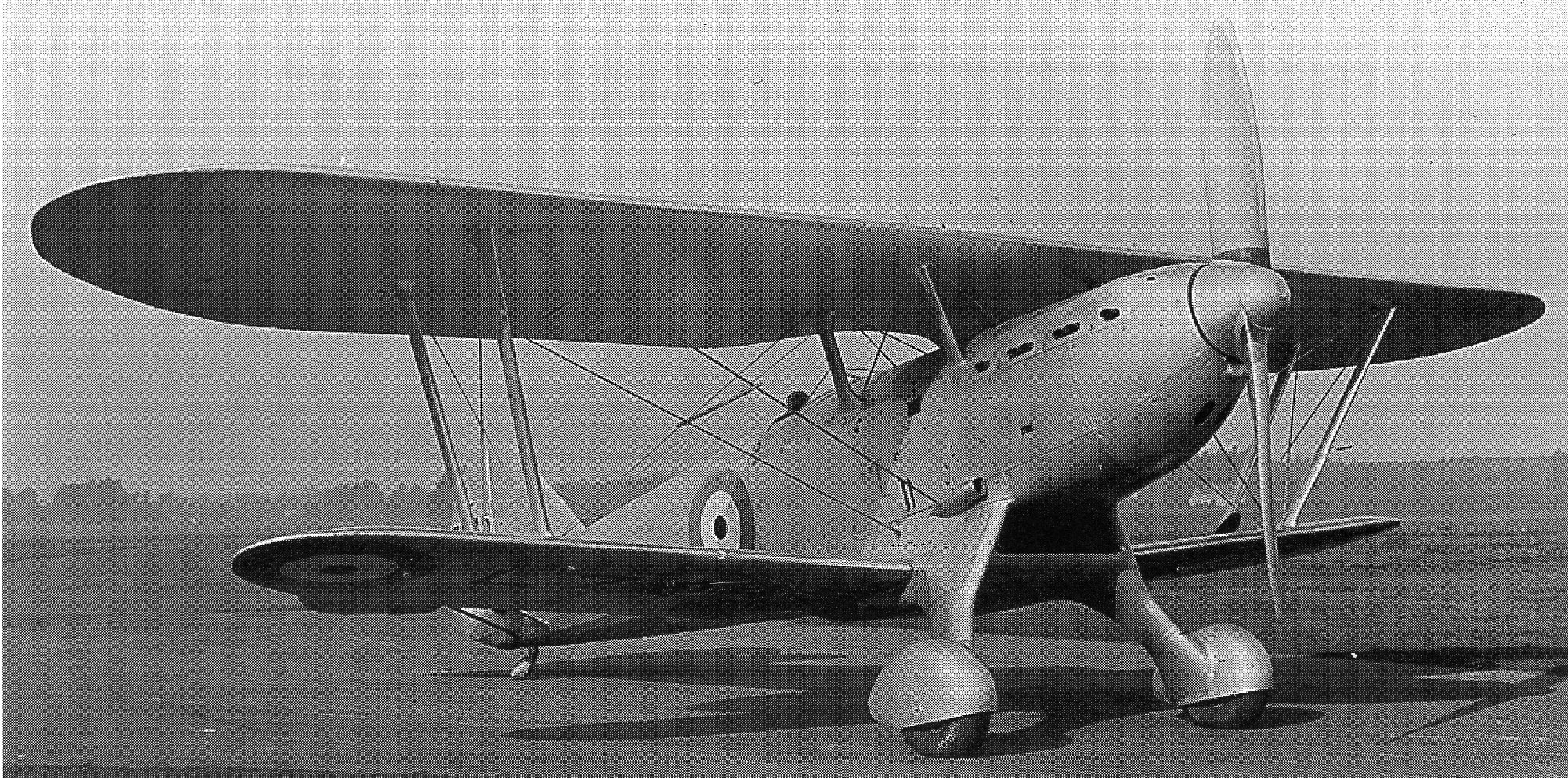

General information
- Type: Fighter
- National origin: United Kingdom
- Manufacturer: Avions Fairey
- Designer: Marcel Lobelle
- Number built: 4

History
- First flight: 6 June 1935

The Fairey Fantôme, also known as the Fairey Féroce, was a Belgian fighter prototype of the mid-1930s. The prototype was designed and built by Fairey Aviation and three production aircraft were assembled in Belgium by Avions Fairey.

== Development ==
The Fantôme was designed in 1934 by Marcel Lobelle to meet a specification drawn up on behalf of the Belgian Aéronautique Militaire who were to hold an international competition to find a replacement for the Fairey Firefly II. It was a single-bay biplane of all-metal construction, with fabric skinning. It had a fixed conventional landing gear with spatted mainwheels. The aircraft was powered by a 925 hp (690 kW) Hispano-Suiza 12Ycrs liquid-cooled V12 engine, with provision for an engine-mounted Oerlikon 20 mm cannon firing through the propeller hub. The cannon was supplemented by two 7.62 mm (0.30 in) wing-mounted Browning machine guns, while two more synchronised Brownings could be fitted in the upper fuselage if the cannon was not present.

== Operational history ==
The Fantôme first flew on 6 June 1935 at the Great West Aerodrome (now part of London Heathrow Airport. The aircraft was shown at the 1935 RAF and SBAC airshows at RAF Hendon in July before being delivered to Belgium to take part in the Belgian fighter competition. It crashed at Evere on 17 July during the competition, killing the pilot. Fairey had already produced parts and components for three other aircraft. These were shipped to Belgium in 1936 and completed under the name Fairey Féroce at Avions Fairey's factory at Gosselies, but Belgium had meanwhile revised its requirements for fighters. Two of them were sold to the Soviet government, which some sources state later gave them to the Spanish Republican air force during the Spanish Civil War, other sources claim that no evidence can be found of such a transfer. The fourth aircraft returned to Britain where it was acquired by the British Air Ministry, where both its flying performance and its armament were evaluated. It was transferred to the Air Gunnery School at Rolleston in December 1940 and struck off charge on 19 March 1943. No further production was undertaken.

== Operators ==
United Kingdom

Soviet Union

- Soviet Air Force - Two aircraft, used for tests and trials.

Spain

== Specifications ==
Data from The Complete Book of Fighters

General characteristics

- Crew: 1
- Length: 27 ft 7 in (8.41 m)
- Wingspan: 34 ft 6 in (10.52 m)
- Height: 11 ft 4 in (3.45 m)
- Wing area: 273 sq ft (25.4 m^{2})
- Empty weight: 2,500 lb (1,134 kg)
- Gross weight: 4,120 lb (1,869 kg)
- Powerplant: 1 × Hispano-Suiza 12Ycrs , 925 hp (690 kW)

Performance

- Maximum speed: 270 mph (430 km/h, 230 kn) at 13,000 ft (4,000 m)
- Endurance: 2 hours
- Time to altitude: 5 min 40 s to 13,000 ft (4,000 m)

Armament

- 1 × engine-mounted 20 mm Oerlikon cannon
- 2 × wing-mounted .30 in (7.62 mm) M1919 Browning machine guns
