= Avions Fairey Belfair =

Tipsy Belfair
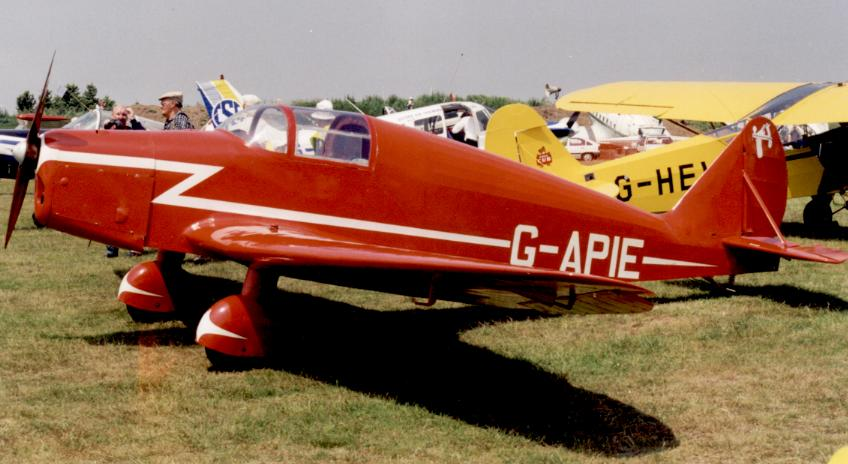
- Tipsy Belfair G-APIE at Coventry Airport in 1999

General information
- Type: Civil utility aircraft
- Manufacturer: Avions Fairey
- Designer: Ernest Oscar Tips
- Number built: 7

History
- First flight: 11 November 1946

The Avions Fairey Belfair, also known as the Tipsy Belfair after its designer, Ernest Oscar Tips, was a two-seat light aircraft built in Belgium following World War II.

== Design and development ==
The Belfair was based on the Tipsy B built before the war, but featured a fully enclosed cabin. It was a low-wing cantilever monoplane of conventional configuration with exceptionally clean lines. It was fitted with tailwheel undercarriage with spatted mainwheels.

The aircraft boasted splendid performance, twice breaking the world distance record for aircraft in its class (FAI class 1A - under 500 kg). The first of these flights was made by Albert van Cothem on 21 August 1950 and covered 945 km (587 mi). The second, made by P. Anderson on 3 August 1955, nearly trebled this to 2,635 km (1,637 mi). Both records were set in the same aircraft, construction number 533, registration OO-TIC.

Unfortunately, the Belfair was a victim of the glut of light aircraft on the market following World War II. The aircraft was priced at BEF 200,000, when war-surplus Piper Cubs and similar aircraft were selling for around BEF 30,000. Consequently, although six airframes past the prototype were under construction, only three had been completed when Tips made the decision that the aircraft was simply not commercially viable and sold the remaining airframes "as is". They were purchased by D. Heaton of Speeton, Yorkshire and completed in the UK, with a further aircraft converted from a prewar Tipsy Trainer to the same standard. One of these aircraft (c/n 535, G-APIE, ex OO-TIE) was still flying in 2025, while another (c/n 536, G-APOD) was under restoration as of 2001.

== Specifications ==
Data from Jane's All The World's Aircraft 1951–52

General characteristics

- Crew: 2
- Length: 6.60 m (21 ft 8 in)
- Wingspan: 9.50 m (31 ft 2 in)
- Height: 1.73 m (5 ft 8 in)
- Wing area: 12 m^{2} (130 sq ft)
- Empty weight: 245 kg (540 lb)
- Gross weight: 500 kg (1,102 lb)
- Fuel capacity: 60 L (13 imp gal; 16 US gal)
- Powerplant: 1 × Walter Mikron II air-cooled four-cylinder inverted inline engine, 46 kW (62 hp)

Performance

- Maximum speed: 177 km/h (110 mph, 96 kn)
- Cruise speed: 160 km/h (99 mph, 86 kn)
- Stall speed: 60 km/h (37 mph, 32 kn)
- Range: 750 km (470 mi, 400 nmi)
- Service ceiling: 6,000 m (20,000 ft)
- Rate of climb: 2.5 m/s (500 ft/min)

== See also ==
Related development

- Tipsy B
