= Tipsy S.2 =

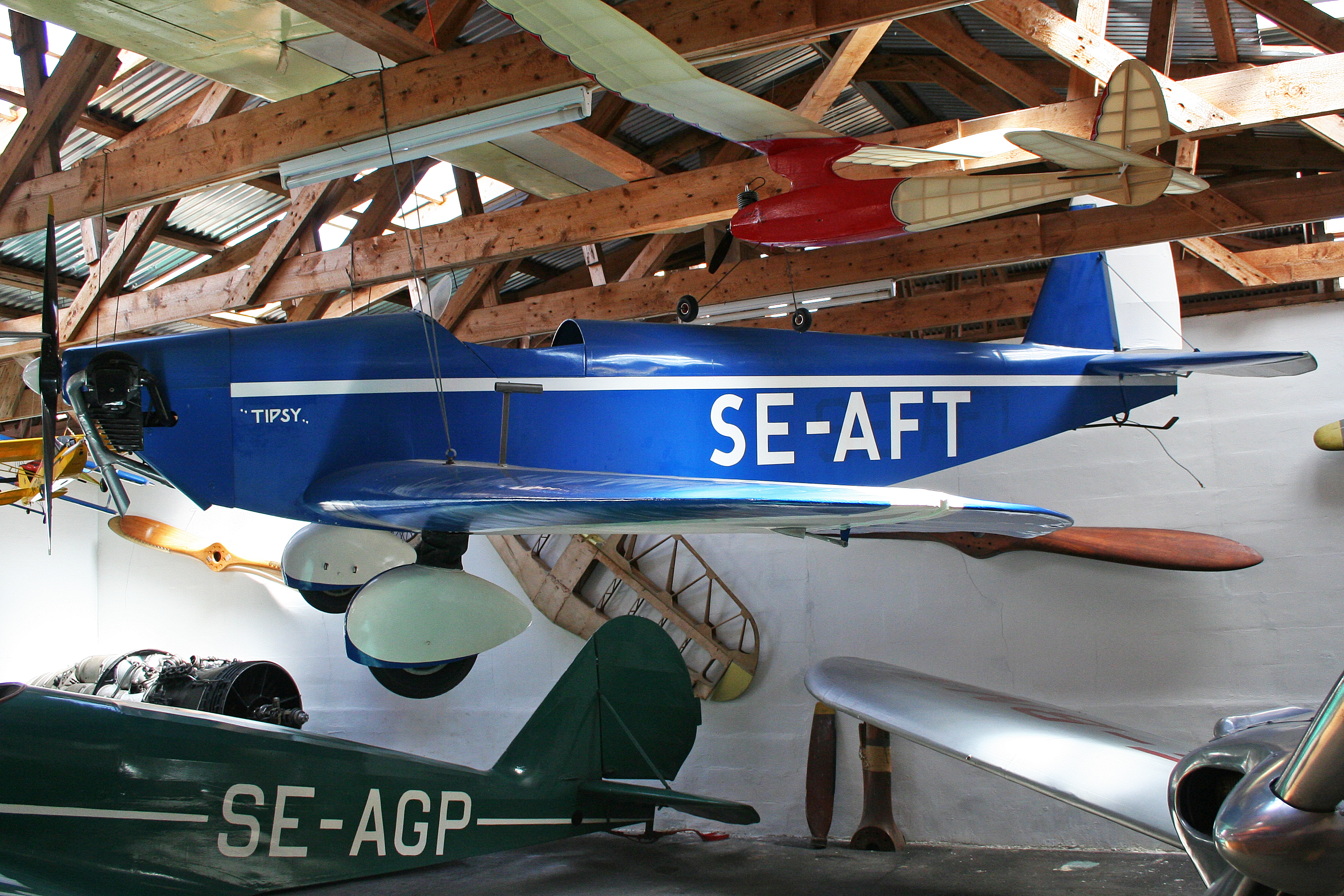

General information
- Type: Two seat sports aircraft
- National origin: Belgium
- Manufacturer: Avions Tipsy, Gosselies Aerodrome, Charleroi
- Designer: Ernest Oscar Tips
- Number built: 26 including prototype

History
- First flight: 11 May 1935

The Tipsy S.2 was the production version of the Tipsy S, a single seat, low wing sports monoplane designed by Ernest Oscar Tips in Belgium in the mid-1930s. It was produced in both the Belgium and the UK.

== Background ==
Avions Fairey, the Fairey Aviation Company's Belgian subsidiary was set up in 1930-1 to produce Fairey Fox and Firefly aircraft for the Belgian Air Force. Its manager was Ernest Oscar Tips. Once production of the military aircraft was under way, Tips found time to design and build light aircraft of his own. The first of these types was the single seat Tipsy S and S.2 in 1935. It was built in Belgium by Avions Fairey and under licence in the UK by Aero Engines Ltd of Bristol. The Tipsy S (for Sport), sometimes known as the S.1, was the prototype. It carried the pleasing registration OO-TIP.

== Design and development ==
The Tipsy S.2 was a wooden framed machine, covered with a mixture of plywood and canvas. The wing was built around an I-section main spar at about one quarter chord and an auxiliary rear box spar. These spars were linked by a rigid diagonal pyramid bracing. Stressed plywood skin was used from the main spar forward, with the rest of the wing fabric covered over wooden ribs. The wing had an "elliptical" shape rather like that of the later Spitfire but with a straighter leading edge. Differential ailerons extended from mid span to the tips; because they continued the trailing edge curvature and their hinge had to be straight though strongly forward swept, the chord of these ailerons initially increased outwards, decreasing rapidly to the tips.

The fuselage was based on four spruce longerons, flat sided and plywood covered. Behind the cockpit was a rounded decking, the depth of which depended on whether the seating was open or closed. The closed variants or Coupés had a deeper decking so that the Rhodoid (cellulose acetate) canopy faired smoothly into it; with the open cockpit, the decking only reached to the top of the headrest.

At the rear the fin was built as an integral part of the fuselage. The fabric covered rudder was rounded, horn balanced and mounted on a forward leaning hinge. The elevators and tailplane together formed an elliptical shape rather like that of the wings. As a result, the elevator hinges were strongly forward swept. The tailplane, mounted on top of the fuselage was supported from the fin near the rudder post with a pair of external struts; the rudder moved above it. There was a small tailskid. The wide track main undercarriage had two cantilever forks fixed to the main spar, with rubber shock absorbers at the attachment points. The legs were faired and the wheels were in spats.

The Tipsy S and S.2 were fitted with a variety of engines, none producing more than 40 hp (30 kW). The Tipsy S prototype began flying with an 11 hp (8 kW) Douglas Sprite, making its first flight on 11 May 1935 at the Avions Fairey field at Gosselies. The following year it had a 25 hp (19 kW) Ava 4A-00 engine, then a variety of small engines including the Sarolea Epervier. Later it returned to the Douglas Sprite, uprated to 20 hp (15 kW). The great majority of production Tipsy S.2s used either the 32 hp (24 kW) Sarolea Epervier (eng: Sparrowhawk) in Belgian-built machines or the 24 hp (18 kW) Douglas Sprite II in English-built ones. Both of these engines were flat twins.

== Operational history ==
Nineteen Tipsy S.2s were built in Belgium, only three not using the Sarolea engine. Just one of the three used a more powerful engine, the four cylinder inverted in-line 40 hp Train 4T. The majority had open cockpits, with just five fitting the enclosed cabin. Several were exported, destinations including France, Indonesia, Poland, Spain, South Africa, Sweden, Switzerland and the UK. The South African aircraft (c/n 34) was impressed into the SAAF during World War II. Only four survived the war and probably only two of these flew again. These other two are now both static museum exhibits: SE-AFT, ex-OO-ASC is at the Flygmuseum at Sloinge, Sweden, and OO-ASB, ex-G-AFVH is painted up as the prototype Tipsy S OO-TIP at the Royal Museum of the Armed Forces and Military History, Brussels.

Nine British aircraft were started but only six completed, and of these only three gained Authorisation to Fly. All were Douglas engined and with an open cockpit. The British market at least had lost enthusiasm for single seat ultralight aircraft and by the end of 1937 no British Tipsy S.2s were flying in the UK. As a result, the Tipsy S was not developed in the UK in the way the Tipsy B was. The S was never given the slotted wing that might have ameliorated its tendency to drop a wing at the stall, then spin.

The single Polish S.2 Tipsy served as the basis for the PWS-36 plane designed for the Podlaska Wytwórnia Samolotów by three recent graduates of Lwów University of Science. However, the design was eventually rejected in 1935 in favour of the PWS-35 created by the same team.

== Specifications (Epervier engine) ==
Data from Grey 1972, p. 10c

General characteristics

- Crew: 1
- Length: 5.72 m (18 ft 9 in)
- Wingspan: 7.5 m (24 ft 7 in)
- Height: 1.45 m (4 ft 9 in)
- Wing area: 9.5 m^{2} (102 sq ft)
- Airfoil: RAF 42 progressing to a RAF 32 and a RAF 22 at the wingtip
- Empty weight: 160 kg (353 lb)
- Gross weight: 280 kg (617 lb)
- Powerplant: 1 × Sarolea Epervier flat twin, 24 kW (32 hp)

Performance

- Maximum speed: 165 km/h (103 mph, 89 kn)
- Endurance: 4 hrs

== See also ==
Aircraft of comparable role, configuration, and era

- Chilton D.W.1
- Gordon Dove
- Watkinson Dingbat
