= Tipsy Nipper =

Aerobatic light aircraft

T.66 Nipper
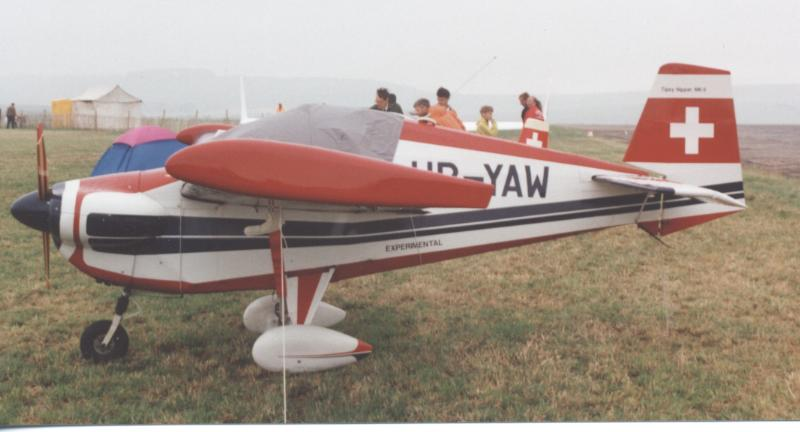
- Swiss Tipsy Nipper at Wroughton, Wiltshire, in July 1992

General information
- Type: Single-seat sporting monoplane
- Designer: Ernest Oscar Tips
- Primary user: private owners
- Number built: 110

History
- First flight: 1957

The Tipsy Nipper T.66 is an aerobatic light aircraft, developed in 1952 by Ernest Oscar Tips of Avions Fairey at Gosselies in Belgium. It was designed to be easy to fly, cheap to buy and cheap to maintain. It was designed for both factory production and home building. "Nipper" was the nickname of Ernest Tips' first grandchild.

The first aircraft flew on 12 December 1957, with test pilot Bernard Neefs. It featured an open cockpit and had a length of 4.56 m (15.0 ft), a span of 6.0 m (19.7 ft) and a range of 400 km (249 mi), extendable with tip tanks to 720 km (447 mi).

== Design and development ==
The aircraft has a welded steel tube fuselage and rudder with a wooden and fabric covered wing, tailplane and elevator. It weighs 165 kg without an engine. Early aircraft were equipped with a 40 hp Stamo Volkswagen air-cooled engine with later types using either 40 hp Pollman-Hepu or 45 hp Stark Stamo engines. More recently the 85 hp (63 kW) Jabiru 2200 engine has been used.

Production was between 1959 and 1961 with Avions Fairey delivering 59 complete aircraft and 78 kits. Avions Fairey stopped production to make capacity available for F-104G Starfighter assembly for the Belgian Air Force.

During 1962 the rights and a large assortment of uncompleted parts were sold to Cobelavia SA -Compagnie Belge d'Aviation, and they assembled 18 Nippers. The type was renamed as the Cobelavia D-158 Nipper.

In June 1966 the license was sold to Nipper Aircraft Ltd at Castle Donington and new Mk.III aircraft were built for them by Slingsby Sailplanes at Kirkbymoorside. Production was ended by the fire at Slingsby's in late 1968 and the subsequent bankruptcy. Several partly constructed Nippers were transferred to Castle Donington.

In May 1971 Nipper Aircraft Ltd. stopped work and sold the license to a company called Nipper Kits and Components, a company that helps home builders with parts and plans.

== Operational history ==
In 2000, about 45 Nippers were still active, mostly in the UK. In 2010, 34 Nippers were registered with the British Civil Aviation Authority, where as of 2017, 19 remained.

== Variants ==
Tipsy Nipper T.66 Mk 1
First production model, powered by a 30 kW (40 hp) Pollman-Hepu engine. Enclosed canopy.
Tipsy Nipper T.66 Mk 2
Second production model; as first but powered by a 33.5 kW (45 hp) Stark Stamo engine.
Nipper Mk III
Slingsby-built for Nipper Aircraft normally with 1500 cc, 33.5 kW (45 hp) Rollason Ardem Mk X engines, 32 built. Tip tanks optional.
Cobelavia D-158 Nipper
Production variant - 18 built

== Specification (Mk.2) ==
Data from Simpson 2001, p. 549

General characteristics

- Crew: 1
- Length: 4.5 m (14 ft 9 in)
- Wingspan: 5.99 m (19 ft 8 in)
- Height: 1.88 m (6 ft 2 in)
- Empty weight: 299 kg (659 lb)
- Powerplant: 1 × Stark Stamo 1400A , 34 kW (45 hp)

Performance

- Maximum speed: 162 km/h (101 mph, 87 kn)
- Cruise speed: 150 km/h (93 mph, 81 kn)
- Range: 320 km (200 mi, 170 nmi)
- Rate of climb: 3.25 m/s (640 ft/min)
