= Great West Aerodrome =

Grass airfield near London, England, 1930–1944

Coordinates: 51°28′39″N 000°27′41″W

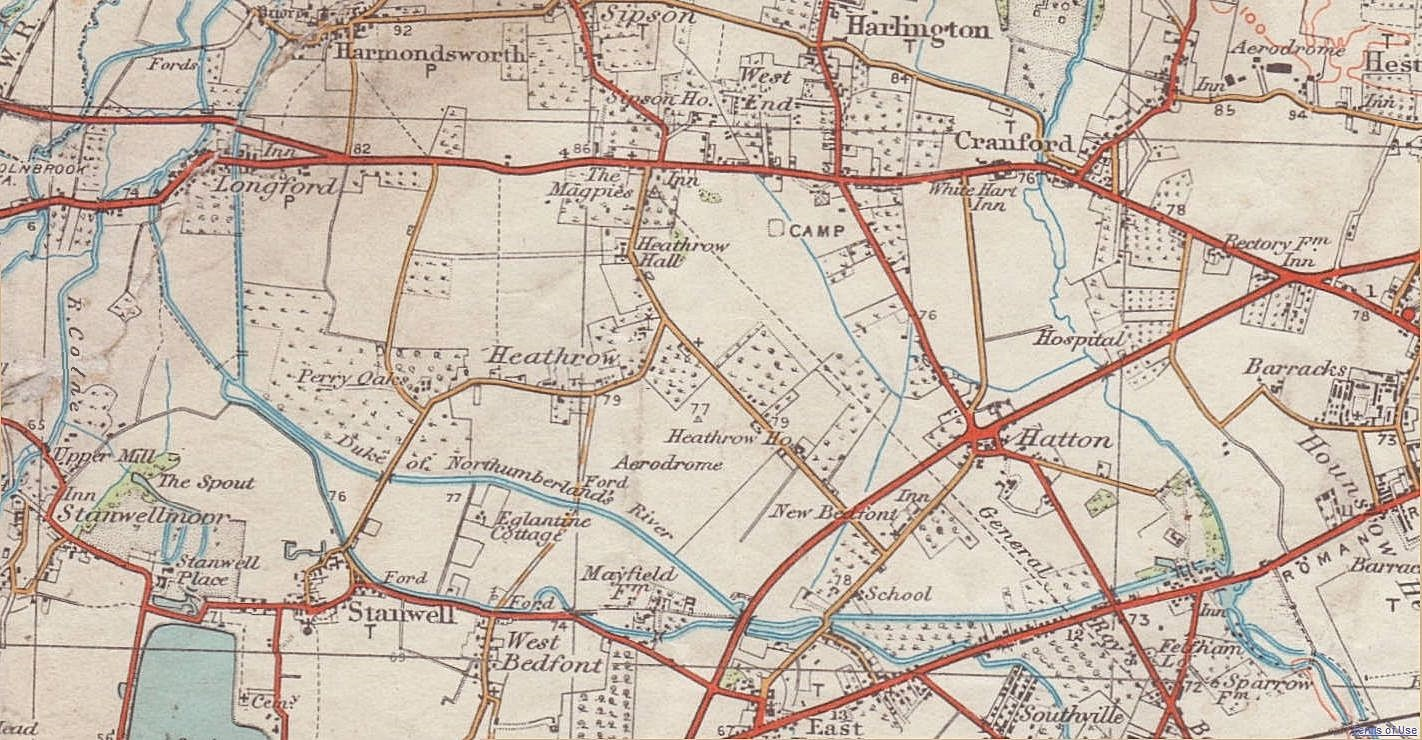
Location of aerodrome in late 1930s

The Great West Aerodrome, also known as Harmondsworth Aerodrome or Heathrow Aerodrome, was a grass airfield which operated between 1930 and 1944. It was on the southeast edge of the hamlet of Heathrow, in the parish of Harmondsworth. The Fairey Aviation Company owned and operated it for assembly and flight testing of Fairey-manufactured aircraft. The area would later become the site of London Heathrow Airport.

== Construction ==
Since 1915, Fairey Aviation had been assembling and flight testing its aircraft from Northolt Aerodrome, but in 1928 the Air Ministry gave it notice to cease using Northolt. Fairey Aviation needed an airfield for flight testing of aircraft designed and manufactured at its factory in North Hyde Road, Hayes. Its chief test pilot, Norman Macmillan, recalled a forced landing and take-off at Heathrow in 1925. He had noted the flatness of the land, and therefore recommended the area as suitable for an aerodrome. Macmillan flew aerial surveys of the site, then used for market gardening. In 1929, Fairey Aviation started by buying four plots of adjoining farmland in the hamlet of Heathrow from four local landowners: see History of Heathrow Airport#1930s. The total was 148 acres (60 ha), at about £1,500, at the typical 1929 farmland market rate of £10 per acre. The site was bounded to the north-east by Cain's Lane, to the south by the Duke of Northumberland's River, and to the west by High Tree Lane. The airfield boundaries were south of the Bath Road, north-west of the Great South West Road, and about two miles west of the west end of the Great West Road. The airfield was about three miles by road from the Hayes factory, and it was declared operational in June 1930. That year, an additional plot of 29 acres (12 ha) was bought, and a hangar was built.

== Flight testing ==
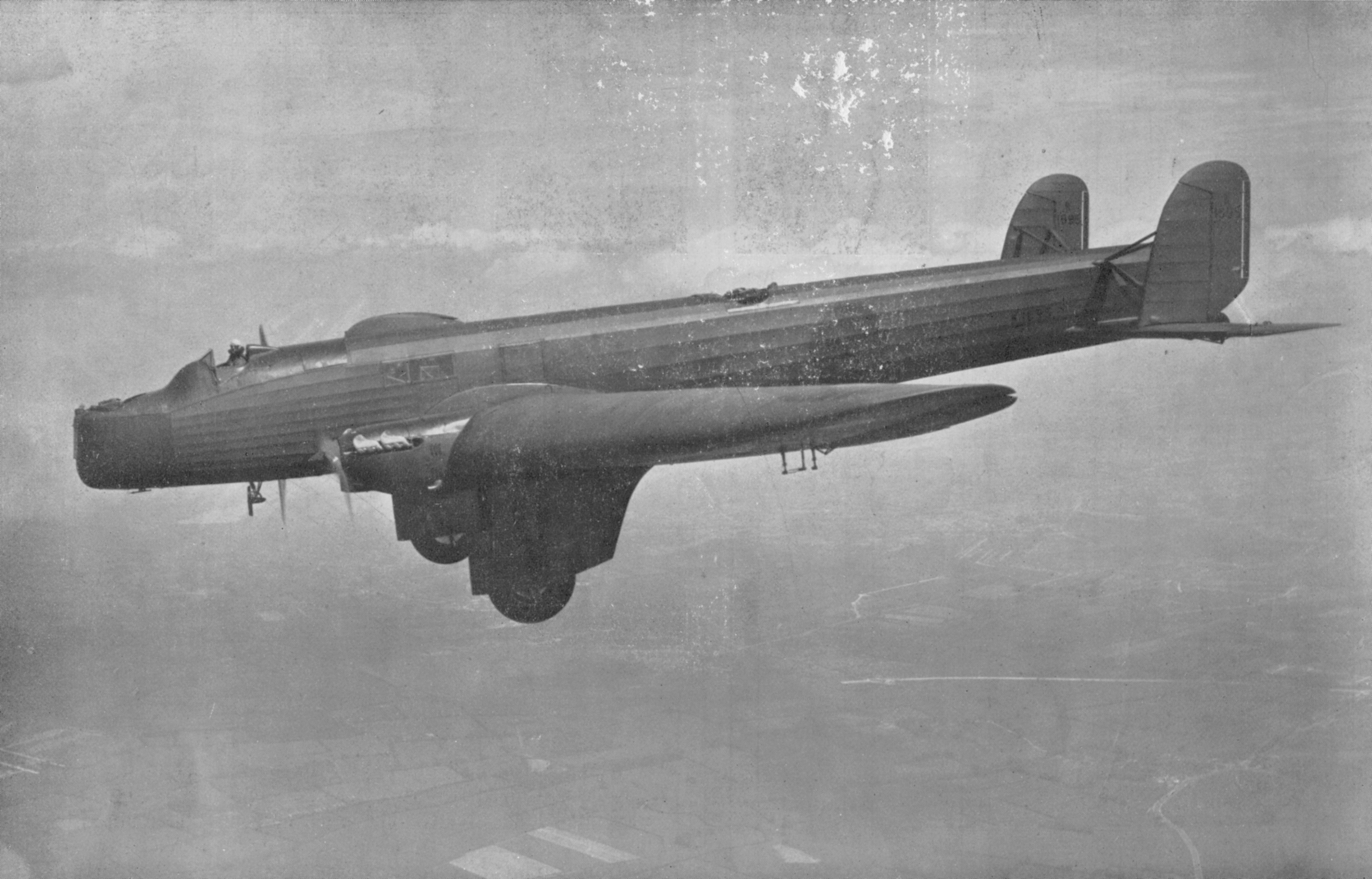
The prototype Fairey Night Bomber K1695

On 25 November 1930, the maiden flight of the Fairey Night Bomber (K1695) was the first major experimental activity at the Great West Aerodrome. On 15 March 1931, the aircraft overran the boundary at Cain's Lane during an emergency landing, requiring re-design of engine installations, major repairs and project delay. Other notable types flown from there included Fairey Fox, Fairey Gordon, Fairey Firefly IIM (biplane), Fairey Fantome, Fairey Swordfish, Fairey Albacore, Airspeed Horsa, Fairey Barracuda, Fairey Battle and Fairey Firefly (monoplane). By March 1938, a second permanent hangar and a temporary canvas Bessonneau hangar had been built.

== Non-commercial uses ==
From 1935 to 1939, the Royal Aeronautical Society (RAeS) held its annual garden party fly-ins at the airfield, at the invitation of Richard Fairey, chairman and managing director of Fairey Aviation Company Ltd, and a past president of the RAeS. The events were aviation society gatherings combined with promotion and display of aircraft and their manufacturers, before the development of aircraft industry shows in Britain, from 1947: see Heathrow (hamlet)#20th century from 1935 to 1939.

Richard Fairey, who started in business with model aircraft, let model aircraft clubs use his airfield at weekends.

== World War II ==
The Great West Aerodrome was not an active RAF airfield, but sometimes during World War II RAF fighters or bombers needing to land used it, and their crews sometimes found a bed for the night in Heathrow village.

== Closure ==
View from the Queen's Building at Heathrow Airport in the 1960s. The Fairey Aviation hangar and control tower can be seen in the background.

In 1942, Richard Fairey was knighted as Sir Richard Fairey, and held the position of Director General of the British Air Mission, based primarily in Washington, DC. In 1943, the Air Ministry, headed by the Secretary of State for Air, Sir Archibald Sinclair, secretly developed plans to requisition the airfield under wartime legislation – the Defence of the Realm Act (1939). The plans were stated to be designed to suit the specific needs of long-range bombers, such as American Boeing B-29s, but they were actually based on recommendations from professor Patrick Abercrombie, an urban planner, for a new international airport for London. The project was headed by Harold Balfour – then Under-Secretary of State for Air, later Lord Balfour of Inchrye – who kept the true nature of it hidden from parliament. The decision and plans were finally revealed in January 1944.

In 1943, Fairey Aviation had bought 10 additional acres of land to add to the 230 acres (93 ha) acquired in 1929, 1930, 1939 and 1942. The company intended to relocate its production facilities from Hayes to the aerodrome. The wartime legislation provided no obligation to pay compensation; Fairey Aviation was offered compensation at the 1939 farming land market rate of £10 per acre, and rejected it.

Sir Richard wrote to his co-chairman of Fairey Aviation:

It is manifestly so much easier for the Civil Aviation authorities to look over the airports near London, that the foresight of private companies has made available, and then using government backing forcibly to acquire them, than to go to the infinite trouble that we had in making an aerial survey to find the site, buying the land from different owners, and then building up a fine airfield from what was market-gardening land. And why the haste to proceed? I cannot escape the thought that the hurry is not uninspired by the fact that a post-war government might not be armed with the power or even be willing to take action that is now being rushed through at the expense of the war effort.

After eviction notices in May 1944, demolition of Heathrow domestic and farm buildings, and the closing of roads entering the site, the new airfield was still under construction at the end of World War II. By then, the plans had already changed from proposed wartime military use to overt development into an international civil airport.

On 1 January 1946, ownership of the site was transferred from the Air Ministry to the Ministry of Civil Aviation. On 31 May 1946, the newly named London Airport was officially opened for commercial operations.

The legal dispute between Fairey and the government was settled in 1964 for £1,600,000. Fairey's 1930 hangar, in legal limbo for 20 years, and used as Heathrow Airport's fire station and as backdrop for an advertising billboard for BOAC, was then demolished.
