= Marches of Entre-Sambre-et-Meuse =

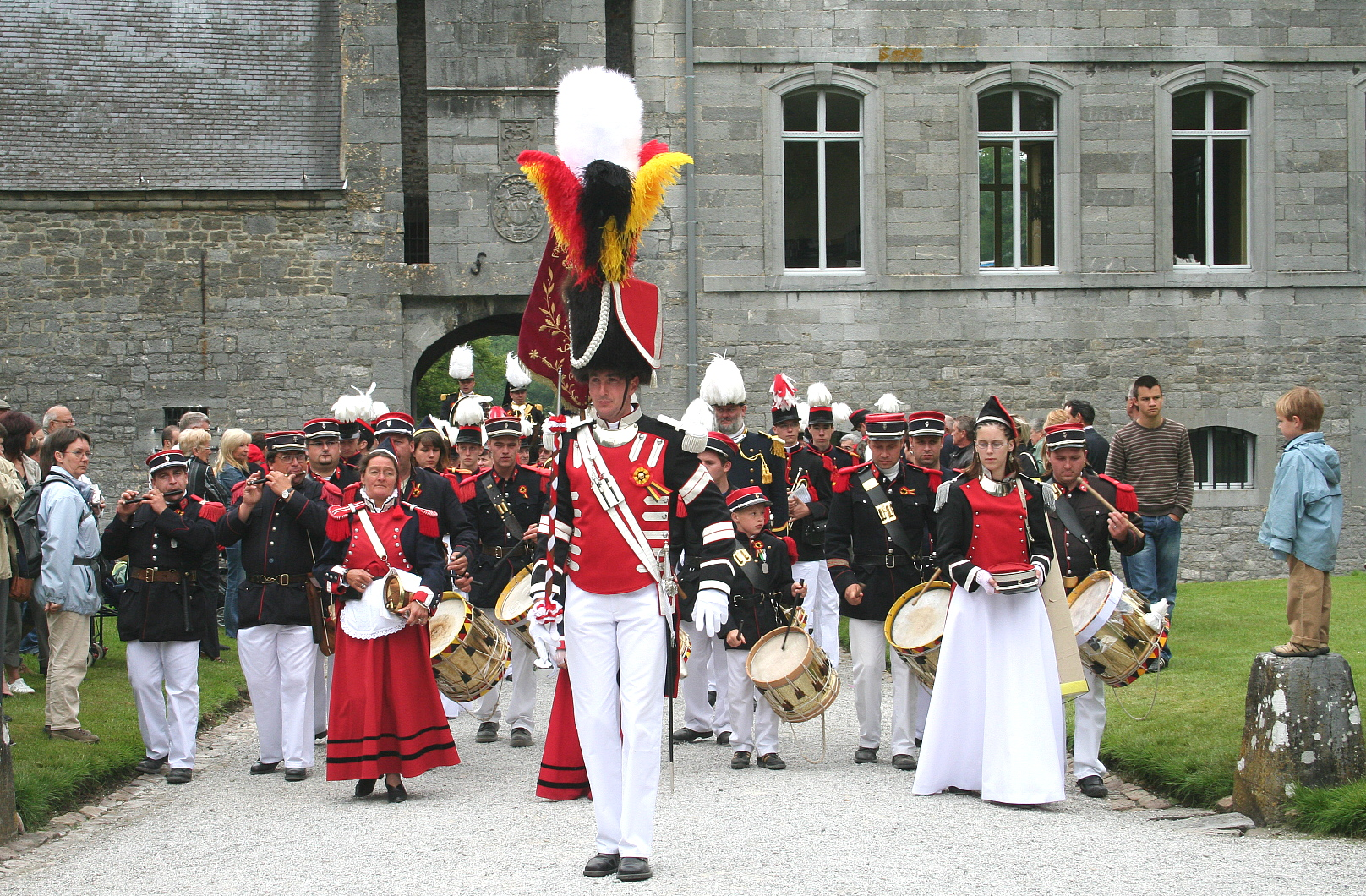
- Joncret's battery leaving the castle of Acoz during Sainte-Rolende (2007)
- Date: May–October
- Frequency: Annual
- Locations: Entre-Sambre-et-Meuse, Belgium

Marches of Entre-Sambre-et-Meuse
- UNESCO Intangible Cultural Heritage
- Country: Belgium
- Reference: 00670
- Region: Europe and North America

Inscription history
- Inscription: 2012 (7th session)
- List: Representative

The Marches of Entre-Sambre-et-Meuse are a set of folk marches, taking place from May to October, in Belgium in Entre-Sambre-et-Meuse. Ancient religious processions dedicated to local saints, protectors of parishes have taken over time a folkloric character, without the religious aspect getting totally lost. They are accompanied by armed escorts, which are just as traditional.

In 2012, fifteen of these marches were recognised as masterpieces of the Oral and Intangible Heritage by UNESCO.

== History ==
Walcourt, Trinité 2012, video report (also on YouTube)

These religious processions have their origin in the Corpus Christi processions. They were most often then dedicated to a saint who miraculously interceded in favor of the local community. Many steps are thus placed under the patronage of Saint Roch (Thuin, Ham-sur-Heure, Châtelet, Acoz ...) who would have interceded on behalf of the populations during the plague epidemics of the 17th century.

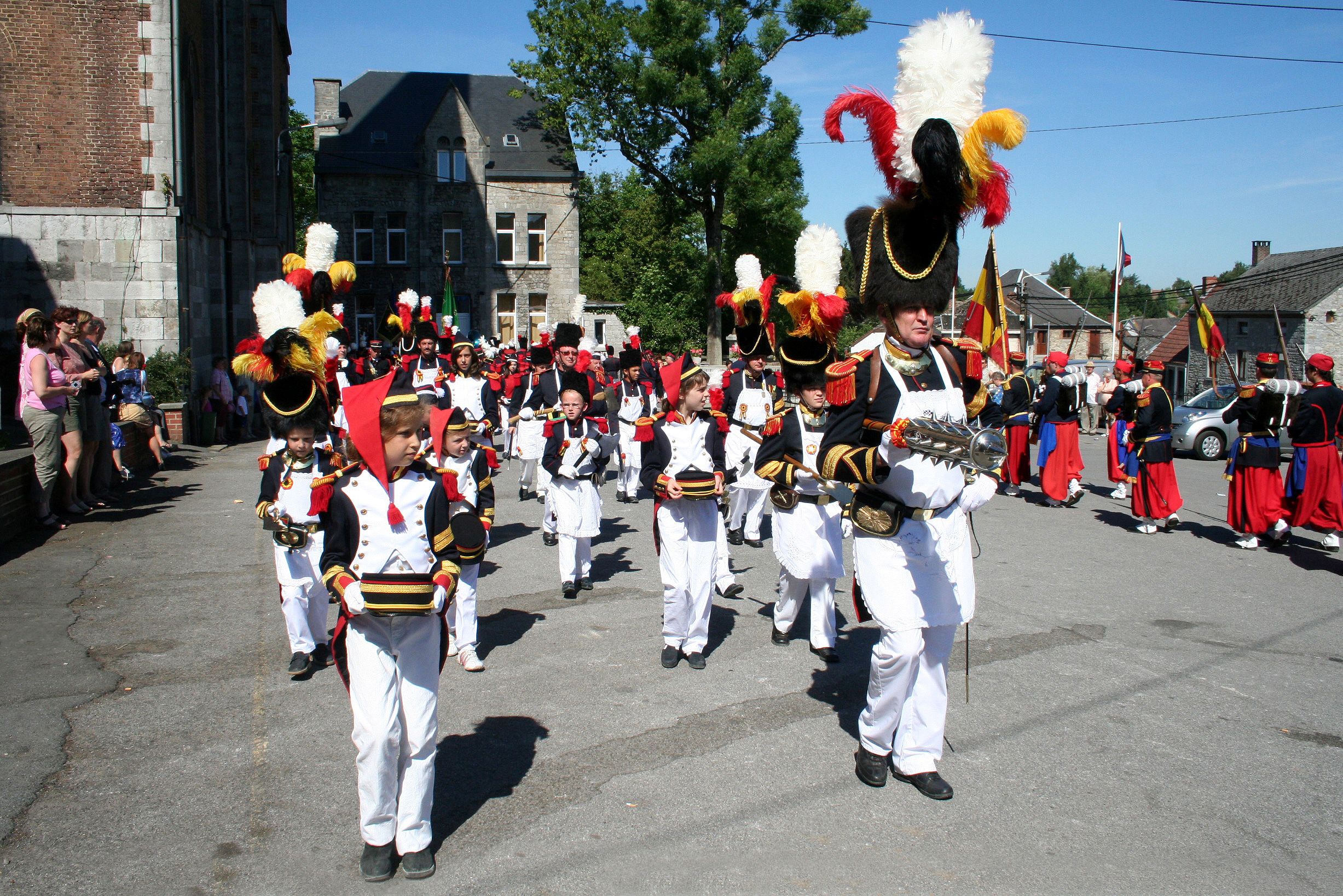
Morialmé, the sappers and zouaves of the Saint-Pierre march (2006)

The origin of the armed escorts accompanying these processions is essentially secular. These armed escorts are the heirs of the urban and rural militias which were to protect towns and villages. These militias also honored major protests in their localities. Over time, these militias have disappeared and their role has shifted to more popular societies, the "jeunesses". These societies of unmarried men were most often responsible for the organization of festive events in towns and villages. These groups perpetuated the traditions by preserving a military aspect to the escorts and by equipping them as best they could with uniforms (of the First and Second Empire and the Belgian Garde Civique) and firearms. Since the 1960s, there have been more groups dressed in uniforms inspired by or identical to those of the armies of the First Empire.

== Procession order ==
Although subject to different variants, the order of these processions obeys a few rules common to the different markets:

- The procession is almost always opened by a platoon of men wearing sapper uniforms. Recognizable by wearing a white apron (in canvas or leather), they carry an axe.
- Next is the corps of drums. Each Corps is composed of fifes and marching percussion (snare drums, bass drums and cymbals) performing traditional marches and folk songs of the region. Led by a drum major, the drummers and fifers are sometimes followed by a fanfare band or a marching band.

Then the majors on horseback follow. These officers are mounted and their number may vary. They are the ones who will generally command the feu de joie of the firing party.

The colour and its escort, most often made up of young children wearing officers' uniforms, are placed between the majors and the firing party.

The latter can be dressed in costumes of outfielders, grenadiers, zouaves, etc. When there are blunderbusses or muskets, these usually close ranks. The main role of the firing party of platoon or squad size is to make the powder speak during the discharges (bursts) in honor of the saint or of the personalities receiving the procession.

The clergy then come, accompanying the relics and followed by the pilgrims.

In some villages, a platoon of riders can also be added to the company. When this is the case, the cavalrymen often opens the way for the parade by trotting or walking in front of the company of troops.

== Glass breaking ==
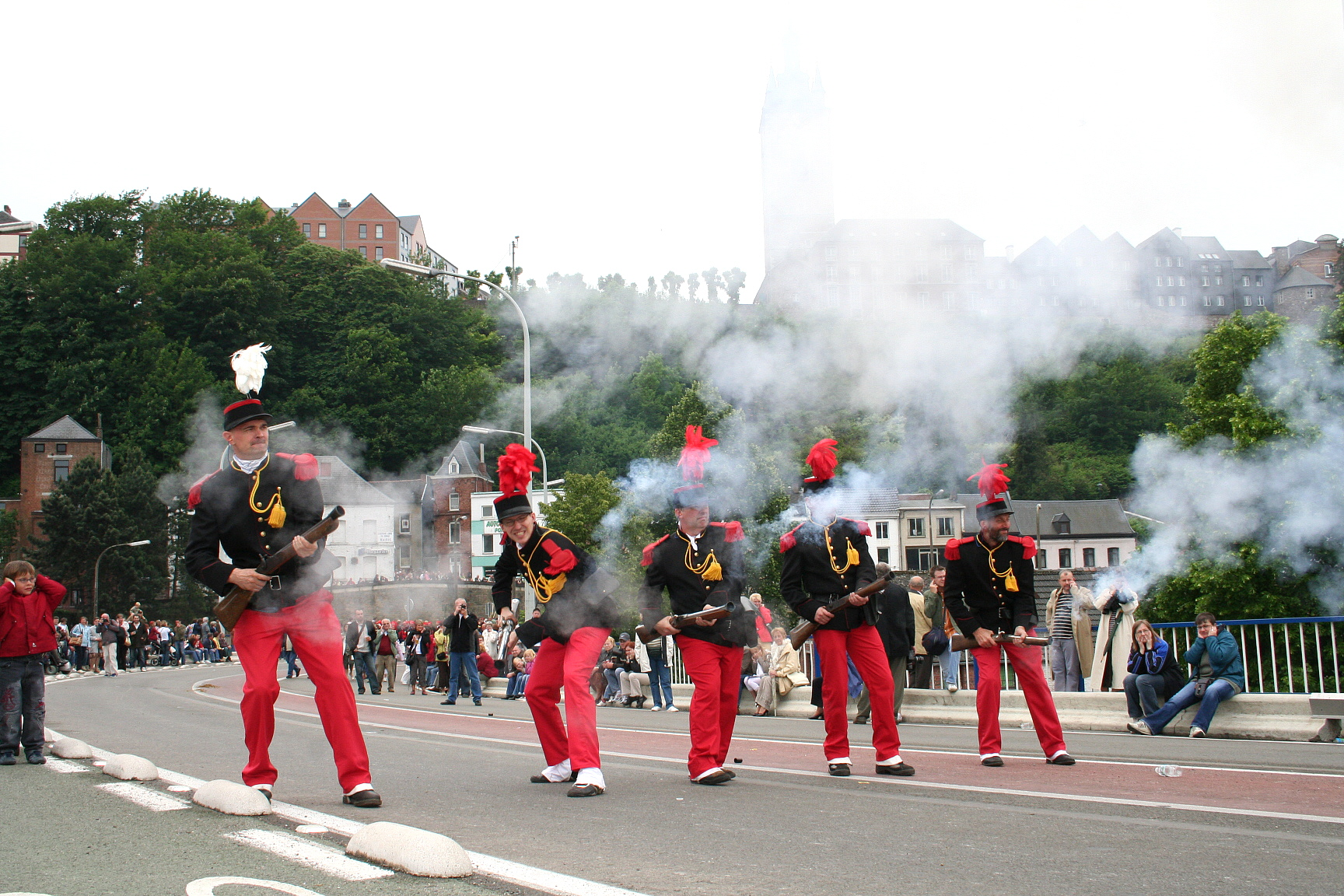
Thuin, blunderbusses of the Fifth Infantry firing a salvo

The breaking of the glass is a traditional ceremony during which, in certain villages of the Marcheurs, the places of officers are allocated. The priority criteria vary from one Company to another depending on local traditions. Numerous office forces are constituted according to degrees of seniority within the Company. Other committees auction off the places of officers and thus favor the highest bidders.

The breaking of the glass constitutes a swearing in ceramony, embedded in commitment, local heritage, and a promise to maintain traditions.

In the presence of many Marcheurs, the mayor and the aldermen, each officer raises his glass, of beer or of "goutte", called a "misérable" at this occasion (because it lacks a foot), empties it at once and throws it violently at his feet. At the moment that the glass breaks, the applause of the spectators and the rolling of the drums salute his engagement.

This "passage of places" is considered very official. The officer must organize, manage, recruit and ensure the maintenance of dignity.

Statutes of 1894 mention the following article: "Whoever after breaking the glass would evade the contracted engagement would be regarded as perjury. We would despise him, he would lose all confidence!".

== Intangible Cultural Heritage ==
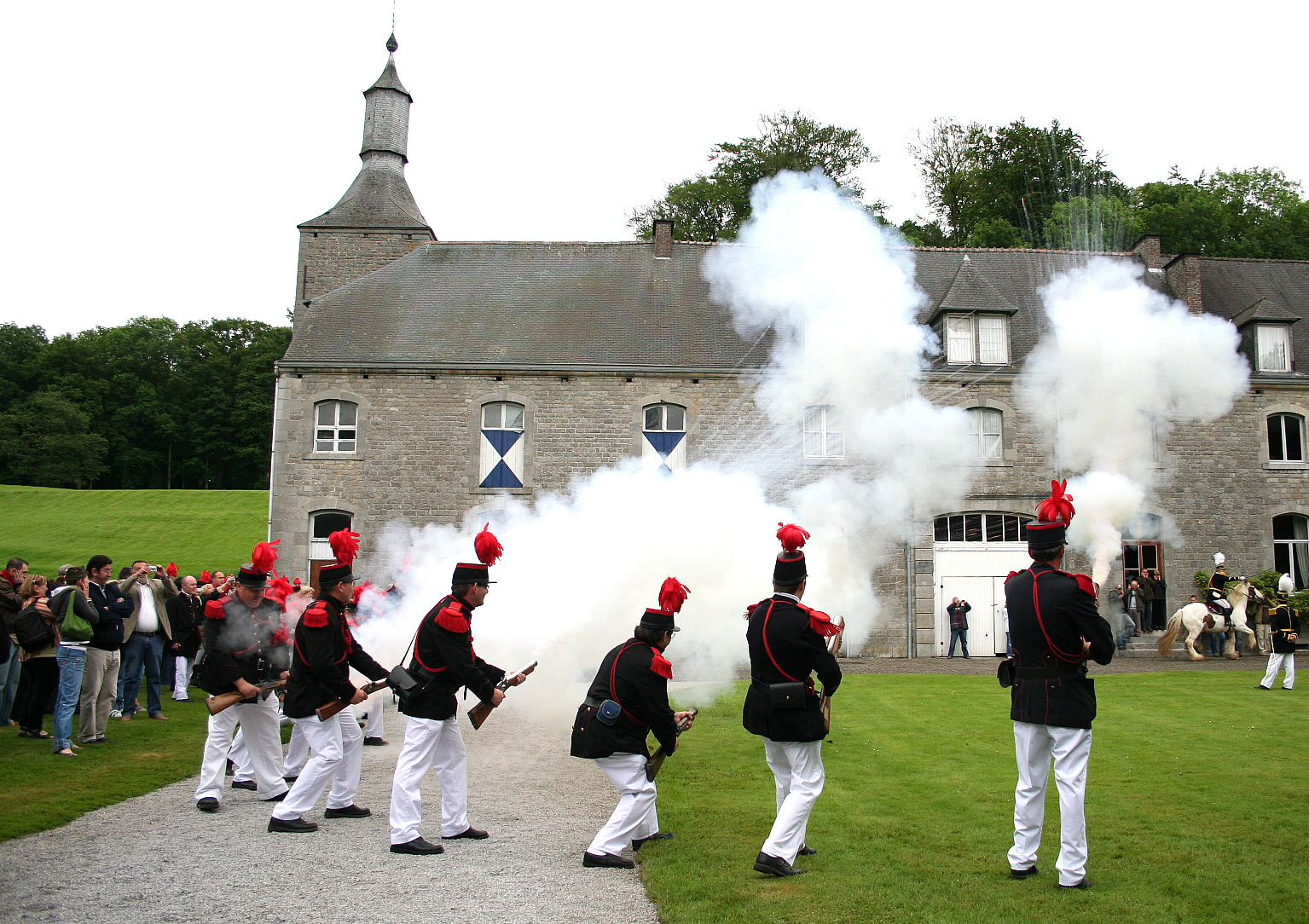
Acoz, salvo in the castle courtyard (2007)

The fifteen marches included on the Lists of Intangible Cultural Heritage take place in the following localities:

- Acoz (Gerpinnes): Saint-Roch and Saint-Frégo march
- Biesmerée (Mettet): Saint-Pierre march
- Florennes: Saints-Pierre-et-Paul march
- Fosses-la-Ville: Saint-Feuillen march, septennial march, last march in 2019
- Gerpinnes: Marche Sainte-Rolende
- Ham-sur-Heure (Ham-sur-Heure-Nalinnes): Marche Saint-Roch
- Jumet (Charleroi): Tour de la Madeleine
- Laneffe (Walcourt): Saint-Éloi march
- Morialmé (Florennes): Saint-Pierre march
- Silenrieux (Cerfontaine): Sainte-Anne march
- Tarcienne (Walcourt): Saint-Fiacre march, the first Sunday in May
- Thuin: Saint-Roch march
- Thy-le-Château (Walcourt): Saints-Pierre-et-Paul march
- Villers-Deux-Églises (Cerfontaine): Saint-Pierre march
- Walcourt: March of the Trinity

== See also ==
- Ommegang

== Bibliography ==
- Bouchat, C. (2006). " En être ". Les dessous identitaires d'un folklore. Approche ethnographique des Marches folkloriques de l'Entre-Sambre-et-Meuse, portée au sein du G.A.L. par le Centre culturel de Walcourt, en partenariat avec le Foyer culturel de Florennes, le Centre culturel de Gerpinnes et la commune de Cerfontaine, financée par la Communauté française, l'Union européenne, la Région wallonne et les communes partenaires ["To be one of them". The identity behind a folklore. Ethnographic approach to the Folk Marches of Entre-Sambre-et-Meuse, worn within the G.A.L. by the Walcourt Cultural Center, in partnership with the Foyer culturel de Florennes, the Gerpinnes Cultural Center and the municipality of Cerfontaine, funded by the French Community, the European Union, the Walloon Region and the partner municipalities.] (in French). Brussels.
- Clocherieux, Ch. (1972). À l'heure des tambours et des fifres [At the time of drums and fifes] (in French). Acoz.
- La Madeleine. Marche jumétoise en l'honneur de sainte Marie-Madeleine [Madeleine. Jumetoise march in honor of Saint Marie-Madeleine] (in French). Brussels: Collectif. 1993.
- Foulon, R. (1976). Marches militaires et folkloriques de l'Entre-Sambre-et-Meuse [Military and folk marches of Entre-Sambre-et-Meuse] (in French). Brussels.
- Golard, R. (1985). Chroniques des marches passées (I) [Chronicles of past marches (I)] (in French). Acoz.
- Golard, R. (2008). Chroniques des marches passées (II) [Chronicles of past marches (II)] (in French). Acoz.
- Hasquin, F.-P.; Mayence, S. (1959). Salves sambriennes [Sambrian salbo] (in French). Charleroi.
- Marinus, A. Les marches de l'Entre-Sambre-et-Meuse, dans Le Folklore belge (I) [The marches of Entre-Sambre-et-Meuse, in Belgian Folklore (I)] (in French).
- Roland, J. (1973). Escortes armées et marches folkloriques. Etude ethnographique et historique [Armed escorts and folk marches. Ethnographic and historical study] (in French). 1973.
- Schroeder, A.; Dereze, G.; Foulon, R. (2006). Processions de foi. Les Marches de l'Entre-Sambre-et-Meuse [Processions of faith. The Marches of Entre-Sambre-et-Meuse] (in French). Brussels.
- Thibaut, B. (2010). En Marches. Les escortes militaires en Entre-Sambre-et-Meuse. Leur évolution, leurs traditions, leurs acteurs [En Marches. Military escorts in Entre-Sambre-et-Meuse. Their evolution, their traditions, their actors] (in French). Brussels.
- Lemaire, Patrick; Fouss, Daniel; Focant, Guy (2014). Cerfontaine. Six villages, six marches [Cerfontaine. Six villages, six marches] (in French). Éditions Action Sud.
