= List of protected heritage sites in Fosses-la-Ville =

This table shows an overview of the protected heritage sites in the Walloon town Fosses-la-Ville. This list is part of Belgium's national heritage.

| Object | Year/architect | Town/section | Address | Coordinates | Number^{?} | Image |
|---|---|---|---|---|---|---|
| Collegiate Church of Saint Feuillen ^{(nl)} ^{(fr)} | | Fosses-la-Ville | | 50.396927°N 4.697395°E | 92048-CLT-0001-01 Info | Stiftkerk Saint-Feuillen More images |
| Chapel of Saint Brigid ^{(nl)} ^{(fr)} | | Fosses-la-Ville | | 50.400534°N 4.698870°E | 92048-CLT-0003-01 Info | Kapel Sainte-Brigide More images |
| House "Le Chapitre" ^{(nl)} ^{(fr)} | | Fosses-la-Ville | Place du Châpitre n° 11 | 50.396564°N 4.698421°E | 92048-CLT-0004-01 Info | |
| Chapel of Saint-Roch ^{(nl)} ^{(fr)} | | Fosses-la-Ville | | 50.394872°N 4.704995°E | 92048-CLT-0005-01 Info | |
| Chapel of Saint-Laurent: old church choir ^{(nl)} ^{(fr)} | | Fosses-la-Ville | | 50.403782°N 4.740219°E | 92048-CLT-0006-01 Info | |
| Music kiosk and a zone of protection for its square "Marché à Fosses" (M) and the facades of the buildings located around it ^{(nl)} ^{(fr)} | | Fosses-la-Ville | place du Marché, Fosses | 50.396596°N 4.696524°E | 92048-CLT-0007-01 Info | Muziekkiosk en een beschermingszone van de place du Marché en de gevels van de gebouwen die rondom gelegen zijn |
| Ensemble of the collegiate church of Saint-Feuillon, except the organ ^{(nl)} ^{(fr)} | | Fosses-la-Ville | | 50.396927°N 4.697395°E | 92048-PEX-0001-01 Info | Ensemble van stiftkerk Saint-Feuillon, uitgezonderd het orgel More images |

== See also ==
- List of protected heritage sites in Namur (province)
