= Foillan =

Irish saint

Saint Foillan
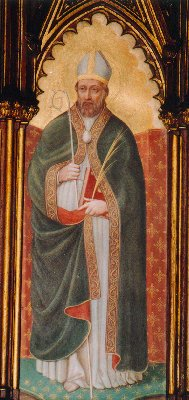
- Born: Ireland
- Died: seventh century Sonian Forest, Belgium
- Venerated in: Roman Catholic Church, Eastern Orthodox Church
- Feast: 31 October (Diocese of Namur); 5 November (Dioceses of Mechelen and Tournai)
- Attributes: Represented with a crown at his feet to show that he despised the honours of the world
- Patronage: Fosses; truss-makers, dentists, surgeons, and children's nurses.

Saint Foillan (Faélán, Faolán, Foélán, French: Feuillen) is an Irish saint of the seventh century.

== Family ==
Foillan was the brother of Saints Ultan and Fursey. He is described as the 'uterine brother' of Fursa, meaning that they had the same mother but not the same father. Certain Latin Lives of Foillan therefore incorporate the Fursa ancestry into Foillan's origins: his mother is stated to have been Gelges, the Christian daughter of 'Aed Finn' (possibly meaning Áed mac Echach), King of Connacht. Fursey's father is stated to be Fintan son of Finlog (though whether of Momonia or of Mag Murthemni, the Bollandist editor finds the sources not in agreement).

== Mission to East Anglia ==
Foillan, probably in company with Ultan, went with his brother Fursa when the latter retired to a lonely island, escaping from the multitudes who gathered around him, some of whom harboured ill-feeling towards him. From there, around 633, Fursa went through British territory to the Kingdom of East Anglia with a group of followers including Foillan and Ultan and priests named Gobán and Dicuill. There they were received kindly by King Sigeberht of East Anglia, who gave Fursa the site of a Roman shore-fort at a place called Cnobheresburg, to build a monastery. The monastery was built at the site usually identified as Burgh Castle or Gariannonum (formerly in Suffolk, now Norfolk), and it flourished between c. 634 and c. 650. The earliest source for Fursa and Foillan in East Anglia is the Vita Sancti Fursei: this was the primary source quoted by the Venerable Bede in his Historia Ecclesiastica Gentis Anglorum of 731.

== Abbot of Cnobheresburg ==
Seized again with the desire for solitude, about 643 Fursa left the monastery of Cnobheresburg in the care of Foillan, while he (Fursa) went off to find his brother Ultan, who had previously gone to live in the East Anglian wilderness as a hermit: Fursa and Ultan lived together for a year in austerity and prayer. At the end of the year Fursa, seeing that East Anglia and the monastery were threatened by hostile invasions, decided to take his leave of East Anglia, and went into Gaul leaving Foillan now fully in charge of the monastery.

The Catholic Encyclopedia states that Fursa made a return visit to the brethren in East Anglia c. 650. This is derived from the Virtutes Fursei, which states that Fursa decided that he would return to visit his brothers, and set out to do so, but then adds that he died on the journey at his estate at Macerias (Mézerolles in Ponthieu), so in fact did not reach them. Neither the early Transitus Fursei nor Bede have the story.

Around 651 there was (as Fursa had foreseen) a disastrous assault on East Anglia by Penda, the Mercian king. King Anna of East Anglia was put to flight, and the monastery of Cnobheresburg fell into the hands of the enemies. It was pillaged, and its superior, Foillan, barely escaped death. He hastened to ransom the captive monks, recovered the relics, put the holy books and objects of veneration on board ship, and departed for Péronne in Frankish Neustria, where his brother Fursa was buried.

== At Péronne and Nivelles ==
He and his companions were well received at Péronne by Erchinoald, Mayor of the Palace, who with King Clovis II had previously befriended Fursa. But soon, turning against these visitors, that nobleman expelled Foillan and his companions from Péronne, and they went to Nivelles, where they were made welcome by (Saint) Itta (also called Iduberg) and her daughter (Saint) Gertrude, and their protector (Gertrude's brother) Grimoald I. Itta and Gertrude, wife and daughter of Duke Pepin I respectively, were the foundresses of the Nivelles monastery in Belgium.

Foillan seems to have been a bishop. He was therefore of great assistance in the organisation of worship, and the holy books and relics which he brought were great treasures for St. Itta and St. Gertrude. As the monastery of Nivelles was under Irish discipline, the companions of Foillan were well received and lived side by side with the holy women, occupying themselves with the details of worship under the general direction of the abbess.

== Foundation of Fosses, and martyrdom ==
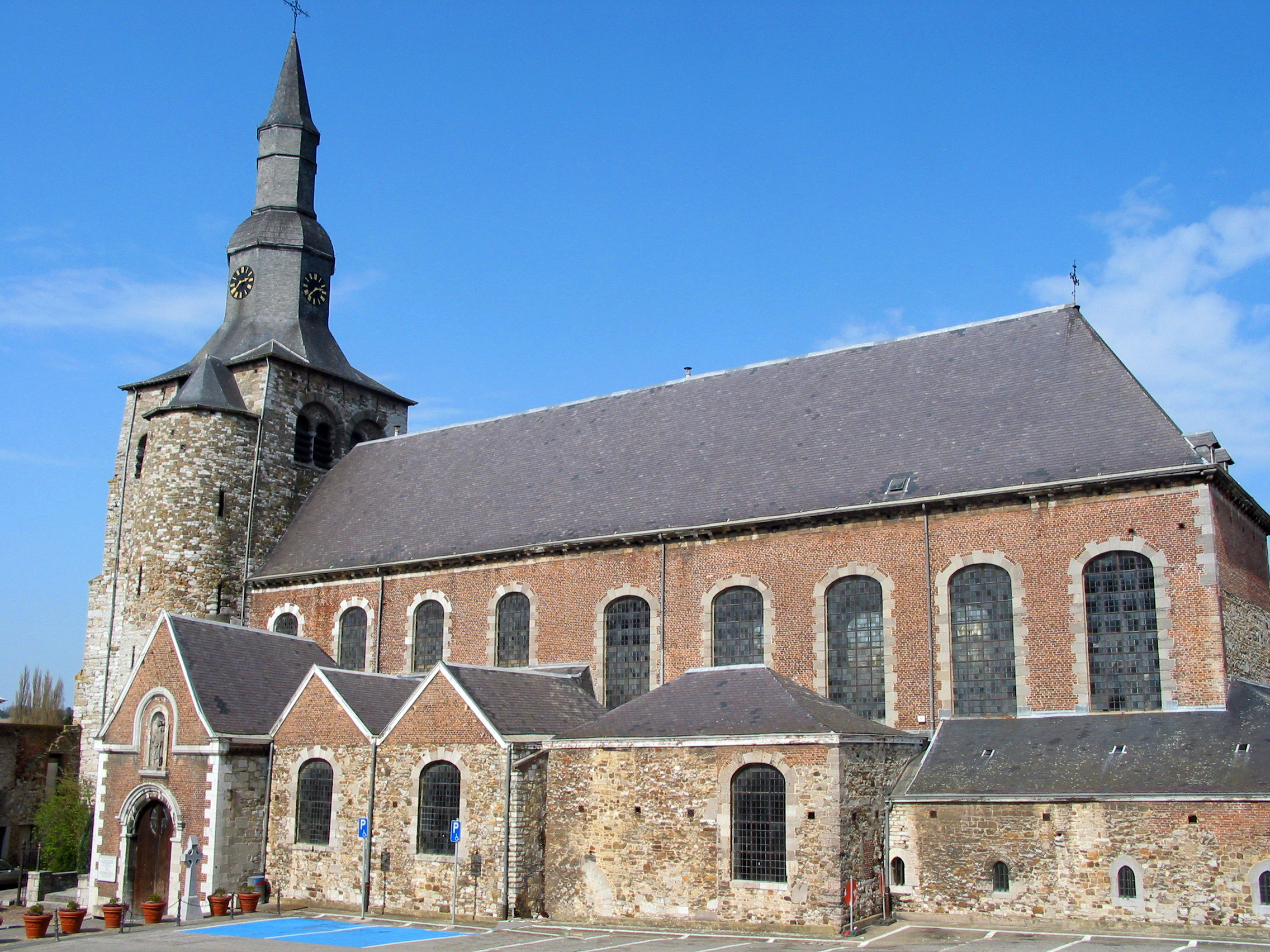
The Collegiate Church of Saint Foillan in Fosses-la-Ville today

Through the liberality of Itta, Foillan was enabled to build a monastery at Fosses-la-Ville, not far from Nivelles, in the modern-day province of Namur. After the death of Itta in 652, Foillan came one day to Nivelles and sang Mass, on the eve of the feast of Saint Quentin. The ceremony being finished, he resumed his journey, doubtless undertaken in the interests of his monastery. In the Sonian Forest the saint and his companions fell into a trap set by bandits who inhabited the dense forest. They were slain, stripped, and their bodies concealed. Foillan's head, still speaking prayers, was thrown into a nearby pigsty. The bodies were recovered by St. Gertrude, and when she had taken some relics of the saint, his body was borne to the monastery of Fosses-la-Ville, where it was buried about 655.

== Veneration ==
Foillan was one of the numerous Irish missionaries who, in the course of the seventh century, evangelised in Neustria, bringing thither the liturgy and sacred vessels, founding prosperous monasteries, and sharing considerably in the propagation of the faith in these countries. Owing to the friendship which united him with Erchinoald, Mayor of the Palace (who, however, expelled him from Lagny), and with the members of Pepin's family, Foillan played a significant part in Frankish ecclesiastical history, as shown by his share in the direction of Nivelles and by the foundation of the monastery of Fosses-la-Ville.

It is not surprising, therefore, that he should be honoured and venerated both at Nivelles and Fosses-la-Ville and to find at Le Roeulx (Belgium) a monastery bearing his name. As late as the twelfth century the veneration in which he was held inspired Philippe de Harvengt, Abbot of Bonne-Esperance, to compose a lengthy biography of the saint. He is the patron of Fosses, near Charleroi. In the Diocese of Namur his feast is celebrated on 31 October, in the Diocese of Mechelen and Diocese of Tournai on 5 November.

There are several Latin Lives of Foillan of varying authority, reproduced by the Society of Bollandists in the Acta Sanctorum. Around 1100 Hillinus, a deacon and cantor of the church of Fosses, wrote a metrical life of Foillan for his master Sigebert, the patron of Fosses. Soon afterwards, between 1102 and 1112, Hillinus also wrote a prose In Miraculis Sancti Foyllani Martyris, a book of the miracles associated with St. Foillan at Fosse.

== Musician ==
According to Gratten Flood, "About the year 653, St. Gertrude, of Brabant, (daughter of Pepin, Mayor of the Palace), abbess of Nivelle, in Brabant, sent for St. Foillan and St. Ultan, brothers of our celebrated St. Fursey (Patron of Perrone), to teach psalmody to her nuns. These two Irish monks complied with her request, and built an adjoining monastery at Fosse, in the diocese of Liege." (* A History of Irish Music, p. 12, William H. Gratten Flood, Dublin, 1906.)
