= Berzée =

Section of Walcourt, Wallonia, Belgium

Berzée Berzeye (Walloon)
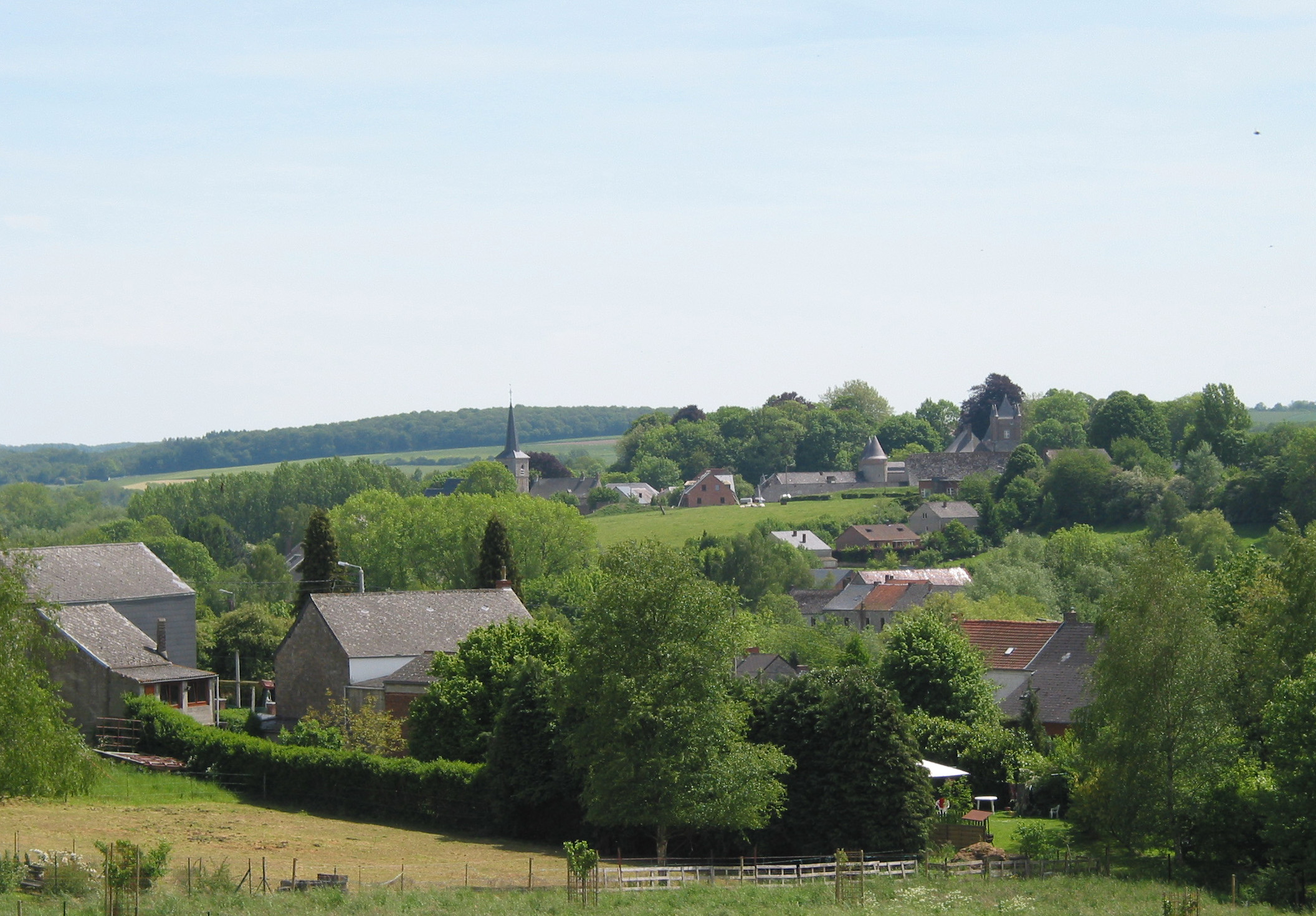
- Berzée

- Location within Belgium Location within Europe
- Coordinates: 50°17′24″N 04°23′56″E
- Country: Belgium
- Region: Wallonia
- Province: Namur
- Municipality: Walcourt

Berzée (French pronunciation: [bɛʁze]; Walloon: Berzeye) is a village of Wallonia and a district of the municipality of Walcourt, located in the province of Namur, Belgium.

A settlement probably existed here during Gallo-Roman times. In the 12th century, it was a dependency of Thy-le-Château, and in 1226 it belonged to Walcourt. From the 15th century, the land was divided between different owners. The village church is a late Gothic building, consecrated in 1584. There is also a fortified farm, founded in the 13th century, in the village.
