= Saint Ultan =

Irish musician and saint

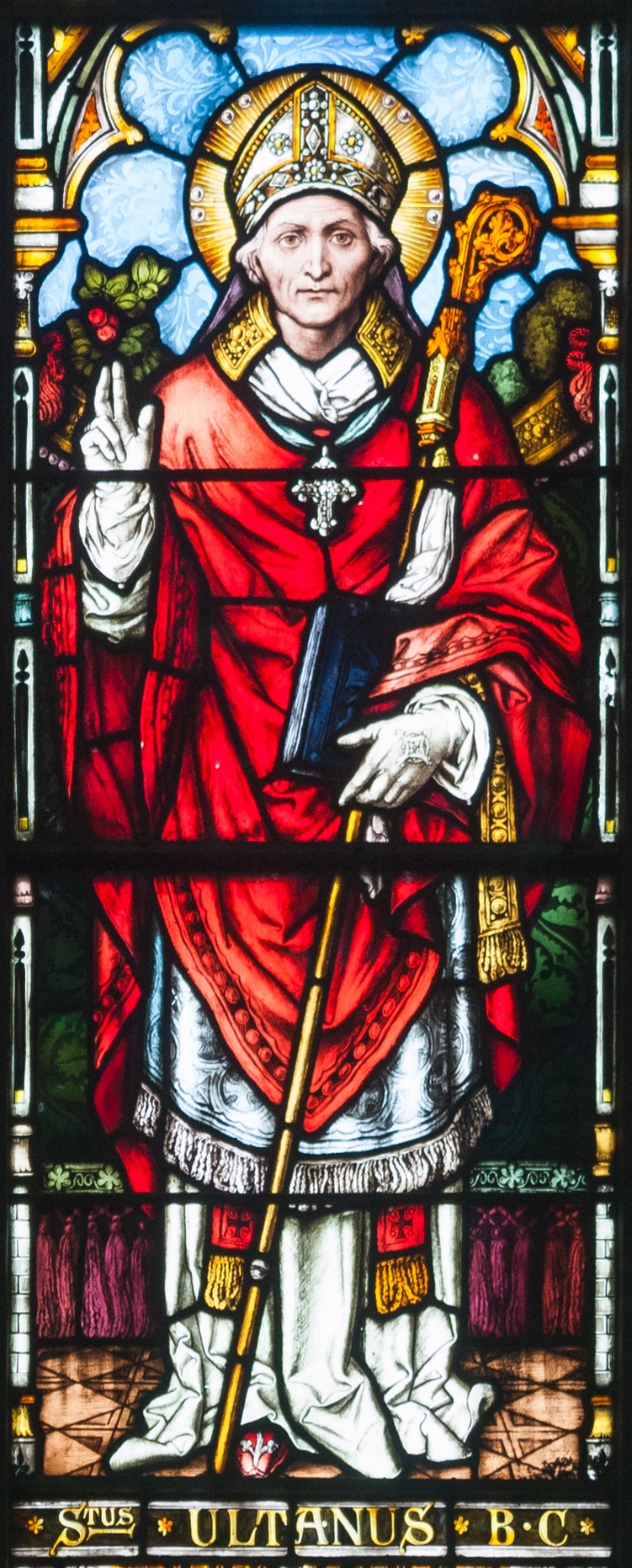
- Stained glass window in the St Macartan's Cathedral, Monaghan

Missionary
- Venerated in: Catholic Church, Eastern Orthodox Church
- Feast: 1 May

Ultan was an Irish monk who later became an abbot. He was the brother of Saints Fursey and Foillan. He was a member of Fursey's mission from Ireland to East Anglia in c. 633, and lived there both as a monastic probationary and later alone as an anchorite. In c. 651 he accompanied his brother Foillan to Nivelles in Merovingian Gaul where they continued their monastic life together.

== Ultan, brother of Saint Fursa ==
The seventh century St. Ultan was a brother of Saint Fursey or Fursa, and of Saint Foillan. He was therefore apparently the son of the royal woman Gelges, herself a daughter of King Áed of Connacht (possibly Áed mac Echach).

The Venerable Bede, in his Ecclesiastical History of the English People, relates that Ultan joined the mission led by Fursa which went from Ireland through British territory to East Anglia in around 633 AD, to the kingdom of King Sigeberht of East Anglia. The monastery of which he was a member there was established in the precinct of an old Roman stone-built shore-fort near the sea, at a place called Cnobheresburg. The King received them and endowed the monastery, and it was later re-endowed by King Anna of East Anglia and his nobles. The site is commonly identified with Burgh Castle (Norfolk) near the mouth of the river Yare, thought to be the Garianonum of the Notitia Dignitatum and of the geographical description of Britain by Claudius Ptolemy.

After several years in which he served a probation in the monastery at Cnobheresburg, Ultan went off to live alone in East Anglia as a hermit. In around 643 Fursey handed his duties to Foillan and went to join Ultan, taking nothing with him, and they lived for a year together by the labour of their hands in a life of contemplation and philosophy. However the kingdom was disturbed by inroads of heathens, and Fursey left East Anglia in around 644, entrusting the monastery in East Anglia and its brethren to his brother Foillan. After being welcomed by Erchinoald at Péronne and by Clovis II and Queen Balthild, Fursey was granted an estate at Lagny on the Marne, where he built a monastery.

A record preserved at Nivelles shows that Foillan and his brethren (including Ultan) fled the Kingdom of East Anglia with the help of King Anna of East Anglia in 651, when the monastery was under attack from King Penda of Mercia, and King Anna himself was then exiled from his own kingdom. Foillan and Ultan took away the precious property and books of the monastery, and after unhappy dealings with Erchinoald they were received by Ste Gertrude of Nivelles and her mother Itta. Foillan went off to found a monastery at Fosse (now Fosses-la-Ville) near Namur with the encouragement and support of Itta, but was murdered with some companions not long afterwards by bandits, during a journey from Nivelles to Fosse.

== Musician ==
According to Grattan Flood, "About the year 653, St. Gertrude, of Brabant, (daughter of Pepin, Mayor of the Palace), abbess of Nivelle, in Brabant, sent for St. Foillan and St. Ultan, brothers of our celebrated St. Fursey (Patron of Perrone), to teach psalmody to her nuns. These two Irish monks complied with her request, and built an adjoining monastery at Fosse, in the diocese of Liege."
