= Sart-Eustache Castle =

Castle in Fosses-la-Ville, Belgium

- Château de Sart-Eustache
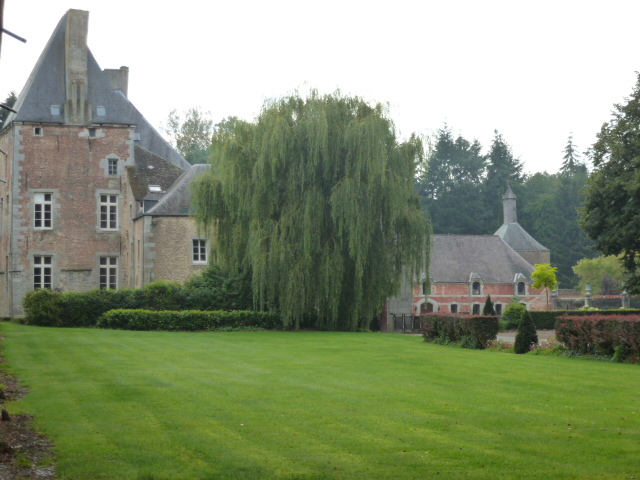
- Sart-Eustache Castle

- Location in Belgium

General information
- Type: Castle
- Location: Sart-Eustache, Fosses-la-Ville, Province of Namur, Wallonia, Belgium, Belgium
- Coordinates: 50.375°N 4.598°E
- Construction started: 1571 (tower)

Sart-Eustache Castle (French: Château de Sart-Eustache) is a castle in the village of Sart-Eustache in the municipality of Fosses-la-Ville, Province of Namur, Wallonia, Belgium. Sart-Eustache is one of six villages in the Fosses-la-Ville municipality, which had a combined population of 10,397 in 2021.

== History ==
The castle originated as a tower built in 1571 by Pierre le Sire, a forge master who operated ironworks along the Biesme stream at the southern end of the village. This tower is the oldest surviving part of the structure. His son François de Sire, a captain of infantry, inherited the tower, forges, and surrounding lands. François was ennobled in 1610 by Archdukes Albert and Isabella.

In 1665, Marguerite de Sire sold the property to Jean Desmanet, from a family of iron masters ennobled in 1660. Desmanet became the first lord of Sart-Eustache. His son Martin-Alexandre Desmanet succeeded him in 1701 and acquired the neighbouring Petit Sart fief in 1702 and the seigneury of Biesme in 1709. The forges ceased operation around 1720.

In 1838, the castle and its lands passed to the de Bruges family, then in 1876 to Baron Guillaume de Giey. Through marriage, the property subsequently passed to the d'Orjo de Marchovelette family, who held it through the 20th century.

== Architecture ==
The castle is listed in the Walloon cultural heritage inventory. Adjacent to the castle on the east side, along rue de l'Église, stands the Basse-Cour farm, a quadrilateral complex dating to the 17th century with later modifications in the 18th and 19th centuries.

== Village traditions ==
The village holds an annual military march dedicated to Saint Roch on the Sunday before 13 August, part of the traditional military escort marches of the Entre-Sambre-et-Meuse region.

== See also ==
- List of castles in Belgium
