= Castle of Thy-le-Château =

Medieval castle in Belgium

Coordinates: 50.281992°N 4.426149°E

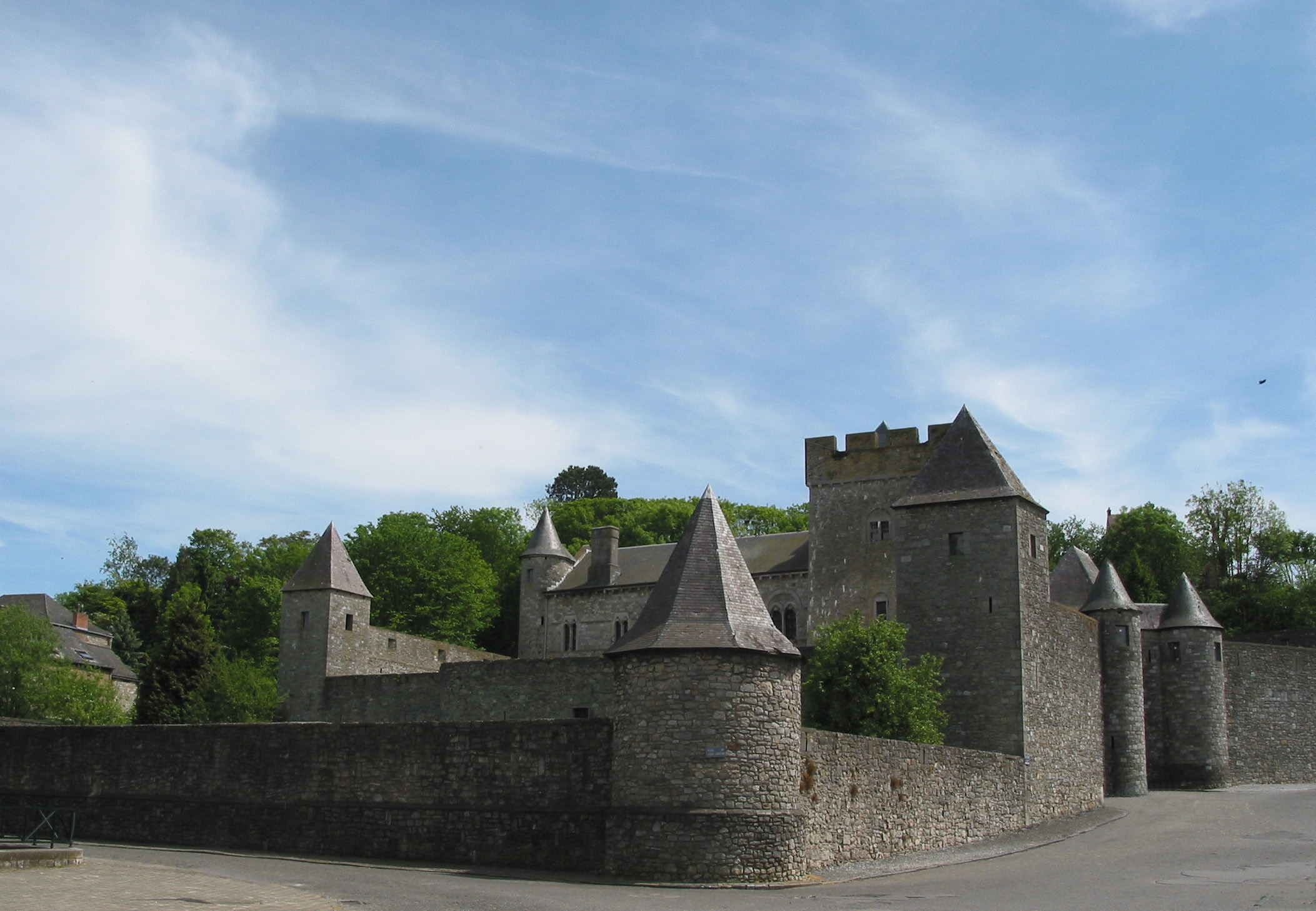
A view of the castle

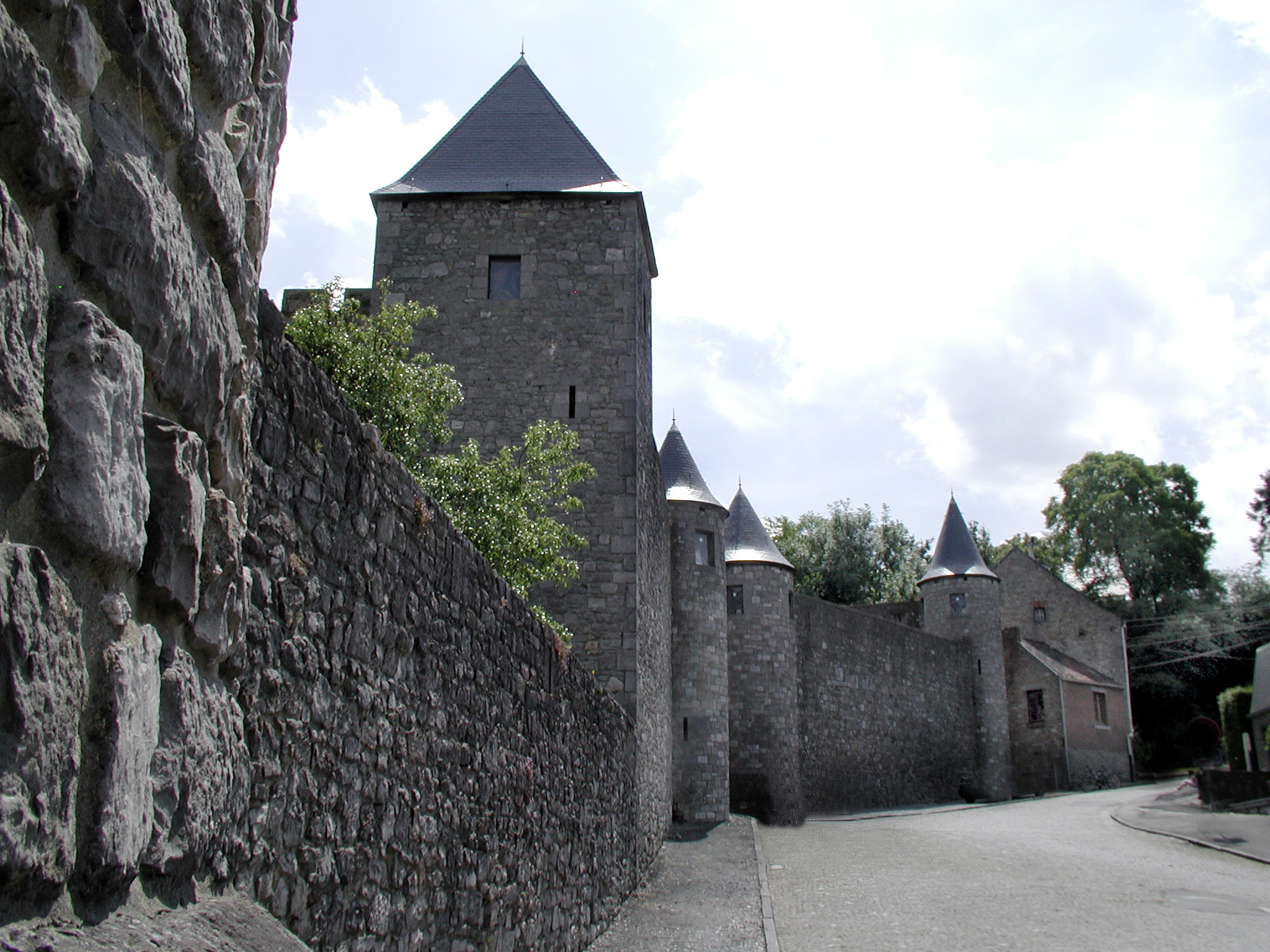
A wall in Thy-le-Chateau

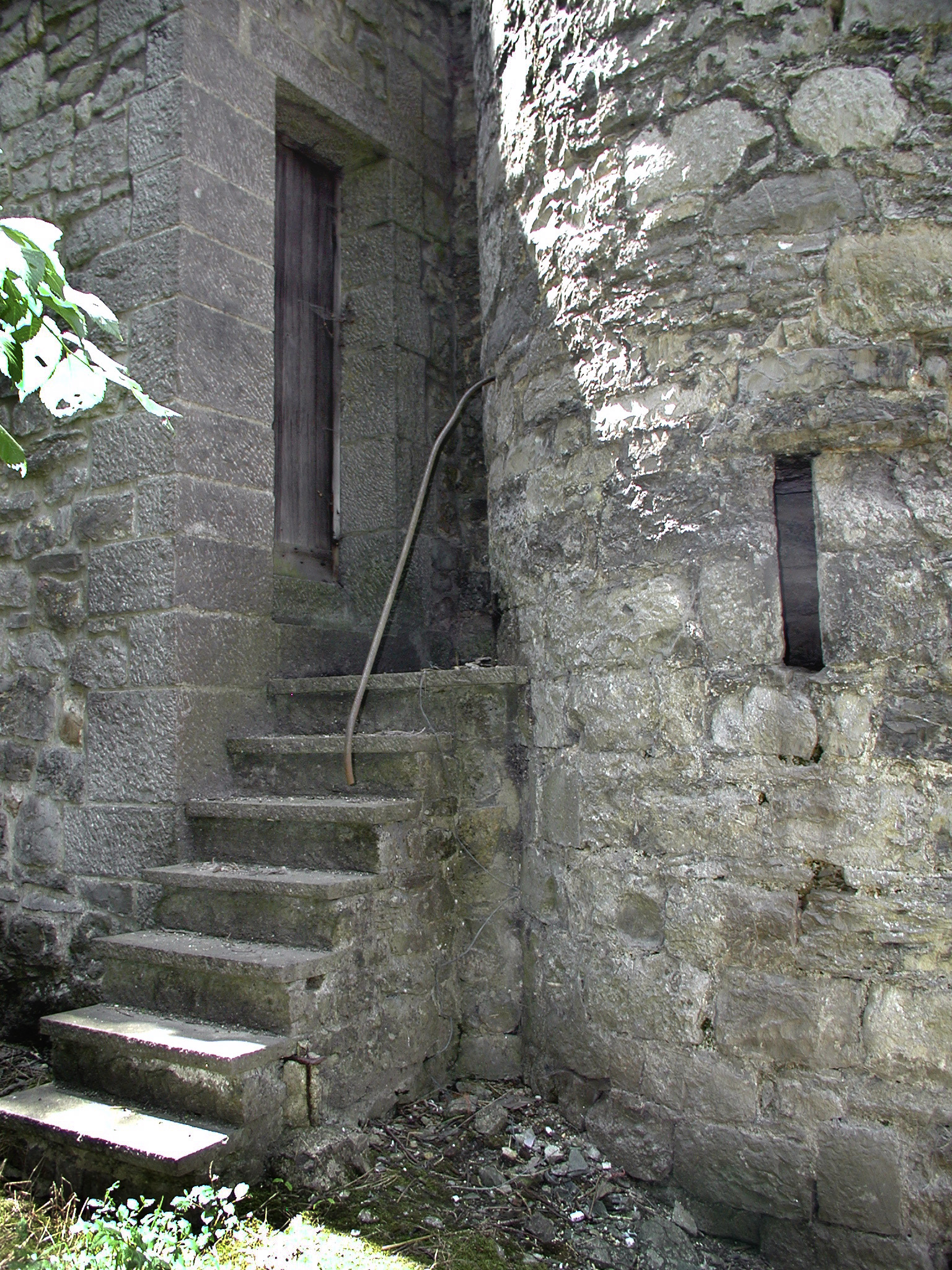
A door in Thy-le-Chateau

The Castle of Thy-le-Chateau (French: Château de Thy-le-Château) is a medieval castle located in Thy-le-Château, Walcourt in the Province of Namur in Belgium. Originally built in the 12th century, it served as the military fortress for several noble clans until the French Revolution, when it fell into disrepair. The castle was successfully restored in 1939.

== See also ==
- List of castles in Belgium
