= Collegiate Church of Saint Foillan =

Church in Fosses-la-Ville, Belgium

Coordinates: 50°23′48″N 4°41′51″E

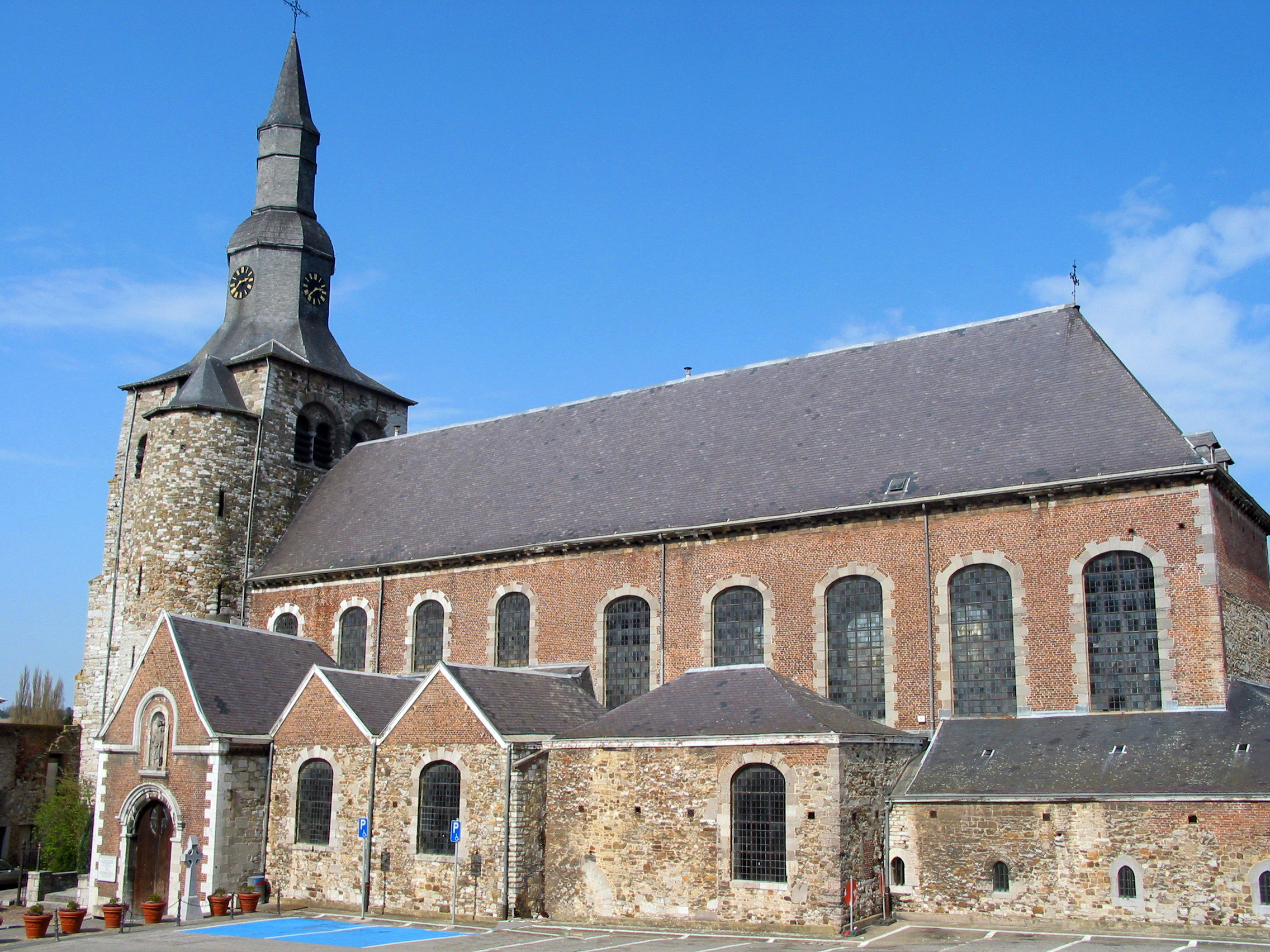
Collegiate Church of Saint Foillan

The Collegiate Church of Saint Foillan (French: Collégiale Saint-Feuillen) is a church in Fosses-la-Ville, a town of Wallonia located in the province of Namur, Belgium. While its origins can be traced to a Merovingian monastery, the oldest parts of the present church, the tower and westwork, are from the 10th century. Around 1086, the relics of Saint Foillan were brought to the church and around the same time the monastery was transformed into a collegiate church. An unusual external crypt, the only one of its kind preserved in Belgium, was constructed in the 11th century. The nave and chancel were almost completely rebuilt in 1721–1723.

== History and architecture ==
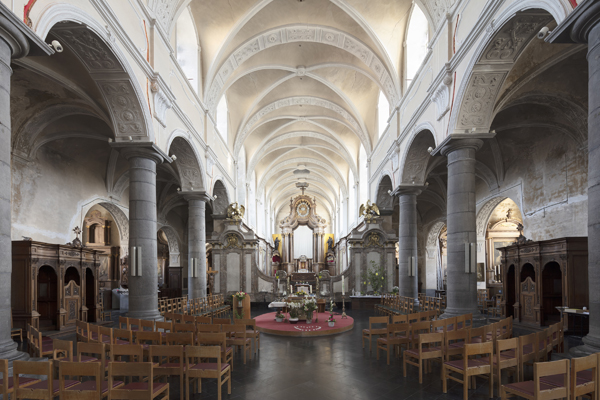
Interior of the church

The church traces its origins to a monastery founded on the same site in 656 by Saint Foillan. Originally it was dedicated to Saint Peter. Little is known about this Merovingian church except that it preceded the currently visible church building. During the Carolingian era, it was replaced by a new building that is partly known through archaeological evidence.

During the late 10th century, the church was again built anew. The currently visible Romanesque western tower and adjoining turrets were date from this time, forming a westwork typical of Ottonian architecture. Sometime around 1086, the relics of Saint Foillan were brought to the church, and at round this time the monastery was also transformed into a collegiate church. In the 11th century the church was also enlarged through the construction of its external crypt. This construction, which allowed pilgrims to pass underneath and around the relics of the saint in the chancel, is a peculiarity of Mosan architecture and was also built at the church of Gembloux Abbey and the Collegiate Church of Saint Begga, but is today only preserved in Belgium in Saint Foillan (but still visible at Susteren Abbey in the Netherlands).

The groin vaults of the church were replaced with the currently visible rib vaults in the 14th to 15th centuries. The nave and chancel were completely reconstructed in 1721–1723; the Baroque tower spire was constructed slightly earlier, in 1707–1708. Of later date is the carillon consisting of 19 bells. The church possesses rich furnishings, including a Romanesque baptismal font, statuary from the 16th to the 18th centuries, and two reliquaries of Saint Foillan.
