= Saint Fursey =

Irish monk (c 597 to 650 AD)

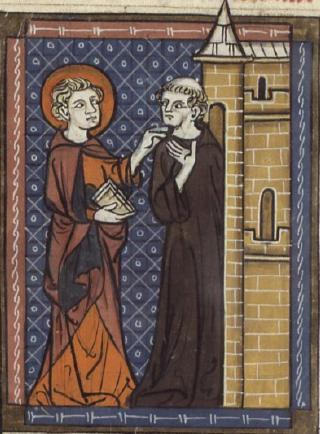
- Saint Fursey and the monk; from a 14th-century manuscript
- Born: c. 597
- Died: 650
- Venerated in: Roman Catholic Church; Eastern Orthodox Church January 29 / January 16.
- Feast: 16 January
- Attributes: depicted with two oxen at his feet; beholding a vision of angels; gazing at the flames of purgatory and hell.

Saint Fursey (also known as Fursa, Fursy, Forseus, and Furseus: died 650) was an Irish monk who did much to establish Christianity throughout the British Isles and particularly in East Anglia. He reportedly experienced angelic visions of the afterlife. Fursey is one of the Four Comely Saints.

== Early life ==
He was born in the region of modern-day Connacht supposedly the son of Fintan and grandson of Finlog, pagan king of the area. His mother was Gelges, the Christian daughter of Aed-Finn, king of Connacht. He was born probably amongst the Hy-Bruin, and was baptised by St Brendan the Traveller, his father's uncle, who then ruled a monastery in the Island of Oirbsen, now called Inisquin in Lough Corrib. He was educated by St Brendan's monks, and when he became of the proper age he was inducted into the monastery at Inisquin (near Galway), under the Abbot St Meldan, his "soul-friend" (anam-chura), where he devoted himself to religious life. His great sanctity was early discerned, and there is a legend that here, through his prayers, twin children of a chieftain related to King Brendinus were raised from the dead. He built his own monastery at Killursa outside the town of Headford in modern County Galway and he became the patron saint of the Parish of Headford.

== Visions ==
He was said to have been something of an ascetic, wearing thin clothing year round. Aspirants came in numbers to place themselves under his rule, but he wished to secure also some of his relatives for the new monastery. For this purpose he set out with some monks for Munster, but on coming near his father's home he was seized with an apparently mortal illness. He fell into a trance from the ninth hour of the day to cock-crow, and while in this state received the first of the ecstatic visions which have made him famous in medieval literature.

In this vision were revealed to him the state of man in sin, the beauty of virtue. He heard the angelic choirs singing "the saints shall go from virtue to virtue, the God of Gods will appear in Sion." An injunction was laid on him by the two angels who appeared to restore him to his body to become a more zealous labourer for the Lord. Three nights later, the ecstasy was renewed. He was taken to the heavens by three angels who contended six times with demons for his soul. He saw the fires of hell, the strife of demons, and then heard the angel hosts sing in four choirs "Holy, holy, holy, Lord God of hosts." Among the spirits of those just made perfect he recognized Saints Meldan and Beoan. They entertained him with much spiritual instruction concerning the duties of ecclesiastics and monks, the dreadful effects of pride and disobedience, and the heinousness of spiritual and internal sins. They also predicted famine and pestilence. As he returned through the fire the demon hurled a tortured sinner at him, burning him, and the angel of the Lord said to him, "Because thou didst receive the mantle of this man when dying in his sin the fire consuming him hath scarred thy body also." Fursey's body bore the mark from that day forward. Exactly twelve months later he received a third vision. This time, the angel remained with him a whole day, instructed him for his preaching, and prescribed for him twelve years of apostolic labour. This he faithfully fulfilled in Ireland, and then stripping himself of all earthly goods he retired for a time to a small island in the ocean.

After some years he founded a monastery at Rathmat on the shore of Lough Corrib which Colgan identifies as Killursa, in the deanery of Annadown. His brothers Foillan and Ultan then joined the community at Rathmat, but Fursey seems to have renounced the administration of the monastery and to have devoted himself to preaching throughout the land, frequently exorcising evil spirits.

== Mission to East Anglia ==
Fursey was the first recorded Irish missionary to Anglo-Saxon England. He arrived in East Anglia with his brothers, Foillan and Ultan, during the 630s shortly before St Aidan founded his monastery on Holy Island.

The conversion of the Kingdom of East Anglia to Christianity began under Raedwald, but halted with the martyrdom of Raedwald's successor, his son Eorpwald. Sigeberht of East Anglia was already Christian when he took the throne around 630. By 633, Sigeberht of East Anglia had established the first East Anglian bishopric at Dommoc and appointed a Burgundian Bishop named Felix.

When Fursey arrived with his brothers Foillan and Ultan, as well as other brethren, bearing the relics of Saints Meldan and Beoan, he had been welcomed by the king, who gave him land to establish an abbey at Cnobheresburg, where there was an abandoned Roman fort, traditionally identified with Burgh Castle in Norfolk.

Here he laboured for some years converting the Picts and Saxons. After Sigeberht was slain by an army led by Penda of Mercia, it is recorded that his successor King Anna of East Anglia, and his nobles, further endowed the monastery at Cnobheresburg. Three miracles are recorded of Fursey's life in this monastery. He then retired for a year to live with Ultan the life of an anchorite. However, as great numbers continued to visit him, and as war threatened in East Anglia, he left Foillan as abbot and proceeded to Lagny, in France around 644.

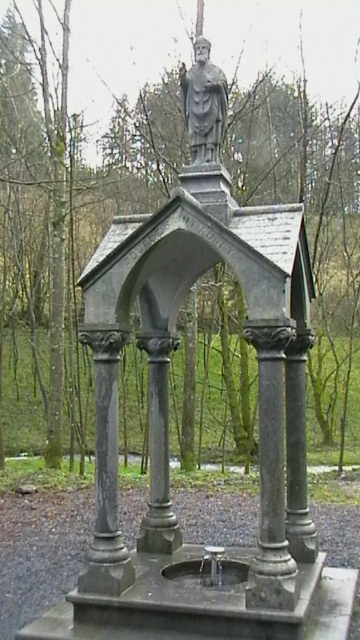
monument to St. Fursey, Bellefontaine

== Mission in Neustria ==
He arrived in France in 648. Passing through Ponthieu, in a village near Mézerolles he found grief and lamentation on all sides, for the only son of Duke Hayson, the lord of that area, was dead. At the prayer of Fursey the body was restored. Pursuing his journey to Neustria he cured many infirmities on the way. He converted a robber, who had attacked the monks in a wood near Corbie, and his family through miracles. He also cured the inhospitable worldling Ermelinda, who had refused to harbour the weary travellers. His fame preceded him to Péronne, where he was joyfully received by Erchinoald, and through his prayers obtained the reprieve of six criminals. He was offered any site in the king's dominions for a monastery. He selected Latiniacum (Lagny), close to Chelles and about six miles from Paris, a spot beside the Marne, at that time covered with shady woods and abounding in fruitful vineyards. Here he built his monastery and three chapels, one dedicated to Jesus Christ the Saviour, one to St Peter, and the third, an unpretending structure, was later dedicated to St Fursey himself. Many of his Irish countrymen were attracted to his rule at Lagny, including Emilian, Eloquius, Mombulus, Adalgisius, Etto, Bertuin, Fredegand, Lactan, and Malguil.

His journeys continued and many churches in Picardy are dedicated to him. He received some premonitions of his end, and set out to visit his brothers Foillan and Ultan who had by this time recruited the scattered monks of Cnobheresburg and re-established that monastery.

== Death ==
He died about 650 at Mézerolles while on a journey. The village was for some time called Forsheim, which translated as the house of Fursey. He was buried in a church (built specially by Earconwald) in Péronne which has claimed him as patron ever since. Many unusual events attended the transmission of his remains, and his body was eventually buried in the portico of the church of St Peter where Fursey had earlier placed the relics of Saints Meldan and Beoan. His body lay unburied for thirty days pending the dedication of the church, and was during that time visited by pilgrims from all parts, incorrupt and emitting a sweet odour. At the end of that time, it was buried near the altar of the church. Four years later, on 9 February, his remains were moved from their earlier location by Saint Eligius, Bishop of Noyon, and Cuthbert, Bishop of Cambrai, to a new chapel specifically built to hold the remains to the east of the main altar. The city would later become a great centre of devotion to him.

== Iconography and veneration ==
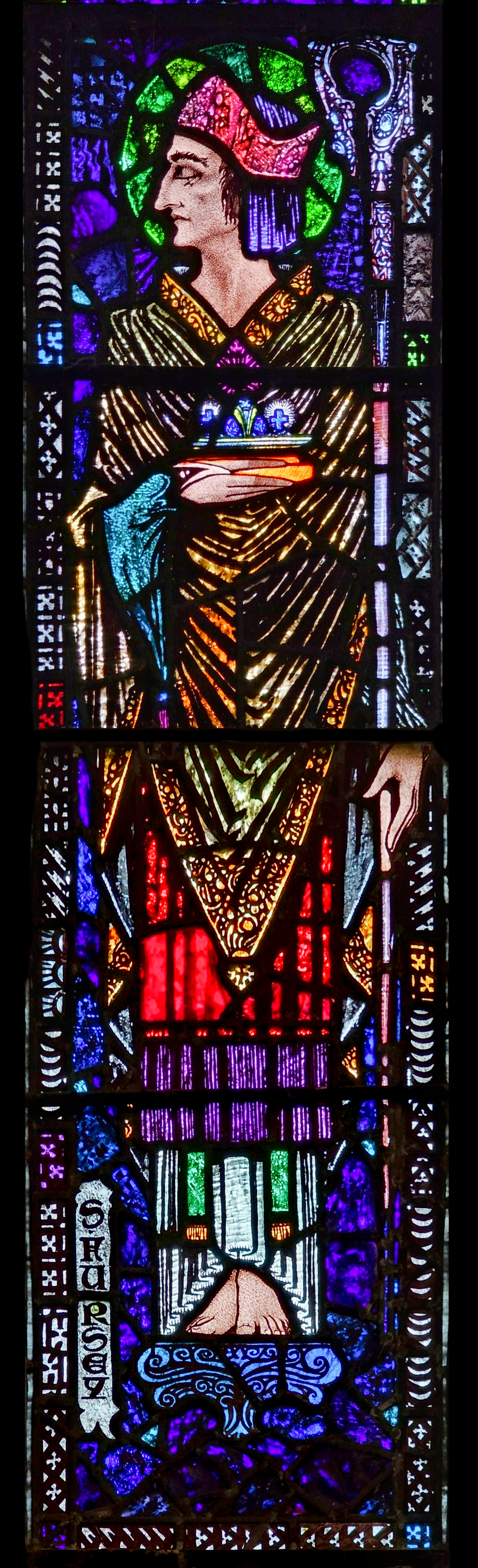
St. Fursey by Harry Clarke

In art St Fursey is represented with two oxen at his feet in commemoration of the prodigy by which, according to legend, Erkinoald's claim to his body was made good; or he is represented striking water from the soil at Lagny with the point of his staff; or beholding a vision of angels, or gazing at the flames of purgatory and hell. It is disputed whether he was a bishop; he may have been a chorepiscopus. A litany attributed to him is among the manuscripts in Trinity College Dublin. An Irish prophecy is attributed to him by Harris. His feast day is 16 January.

== In popular culture ==
- James Joyce mentions S. Fursa in his book Ulysses, among a list of mostly Irish heroes and heroines.
- The Unfortunate Fursey, a popular comic novel by Mervyn Wall describes the saint as a hapless poor soul tormented by visions of buxom women of a type that could only be imagined by the sex-starved Irish ecclesiastics, and bargaining with demons to escape the torments of religion.

== Bibliography ==
- Ann Williams, Alfred P. Smyth and D. P. Kirby (1991). A Biographical Dictionary of Dark Age Britain. Seaby. ISBN 1-85264-047-2
- Attwater, Donald and Catherine Rachel John. The Penguin Dictionary of Saints. 3rd edition. New York: Penguin Books, 1993. ISBN 0-14-051312-4.
- Buckley, Ann. 'Nobilitate vigens Furseus'. The Medieval Office of St Fursey. Norwich: Fursey Pilgrims, 2014. ISBN 0 9544773 6 7
- Dahl, L. H., The Roman Camp and the Irish Saint at Burgh Castle (Jarrold, London 1913).
- Plunkett, S. J., Suffolk in Anglo-Saxon Times (Tempus, Stroud 2005). ISBN 0-7524-3139-0
- Rackham, O., Transitus Beati Fursei - A Translation of the 8th Century Manuscript Life of Saint Fursey (Fursey Pilgrims, Norwich 2007)
- Herbermann, Charles, ed. (1913). "St. Fursey" . Catholic Encyclopedia. New York: Robert Appleton Company.
