= Yves-Gomezée =

Yves-Gomezée Ive (Walloon)
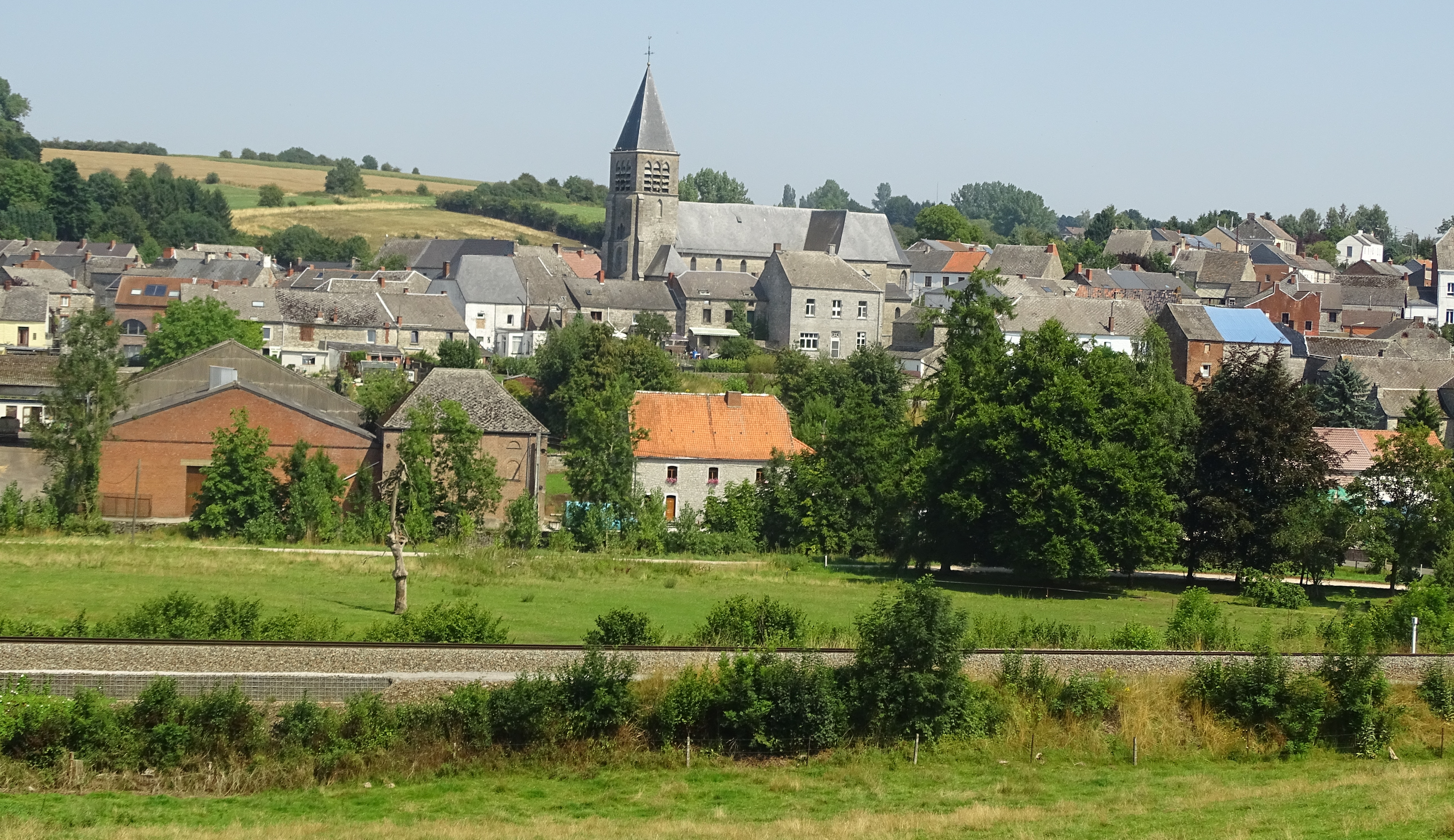
- Yves-Gomezée

- Coat of arms

- Location within Belgium Location within Europe
- Coordinates: 50°14′24″N 04°29′42″E
- Country: Belgium
- Region: Wallonia
- Province: Namur
- Municipality: Walcourt

Yves-Gomezée (Walloon: Ive) is a village of Wallonia and a district of the municipality of Walcourt, located in the province of Namur, Belgium.

The area has been settled for a long time. The Gauls discovered iron ore and developed iron processing centres here, later taken over by the Romans and the Franks. The village church dates from c. 1400, and was partially rebuilt in a Neo-Gothic style in 1865. The chancel was destroyed in 1940 during World War II, but rebuilt after the war. A castle has existed in the village but was burnt down by German troops in 1914, during World War I. The park surrounding the former castle still survives. The village contains several well-preserved old farms and a memorial honouring seven British airmen who died when their plane was shot down above the village during World War II.
