= List of protected heritage sites in Walcourt =

This table shows an overview of the protected heritage sites in the Walloon town Walcourt. This list is part of Belgium's national heritage.

Object	Year/architect	Town/section	Address	Coordinates	Number^{?}	Image
Saint-Materne ^{(nl)} ^{(fr)}	13e-17e eeuw	Walcourt		50.251557°N 4.432070°E	93088-CLT-0001-01 Info	Sint-Maternusbasiliek
Gateway of the Abbey of Our Lady of Jardinet ^{(nl)} ^{(fr)}		Walcourt		50.257872°N 4.434739°E	93088-CLT-0002-01 Info	Toegangspoort Abdij van Onze-Lieve-Vrouw van Jardinet
Ensemble of the location of the ruelle Hugo Frere and the facades of the buildings located them ^{(nl)} ^{(fr)}		Walcourt		50.252774°N 4.432579°E	93088-CLT-0003-01 Info	Ensemble van de ligging van de ruelle Frère Hugo en de gevels van de gebouwen daaraan gelegen
Castle farm of Trazegnies ^{(nl)} ^{(fr)}		Walcourt	rue Bout-de-la-Haut n°s 2-4, Berzée	50.284067°N 4.402581°E	93088-CLT-0004-01 Info	Kasteelboerderij van Trazegnies
Church of Sainte-Marguerite ^{(nl)} ^{(fr)}		Walcourt		50.284747°N 4.403745°E	93088-CLT-0005-01 Info	
Church of Saint-Lambert and monastery wall of old cemetery ^{(nl)} ^{(fr)}		Walcourt		50.277904°N 4.494393°E	93088-CLT-0006-01 Info	
Tower Church of Saints-Pierre-et-Paul ^{(nl)} ^{(fr)}		Walcourt		50.282576°N 4.426232°E	93088-CLT-0009-01 Info	
Church of Saint-Remi: first three bays of the naves, transept and choir ^{(nl)} ^{(fr)}		Walcourt		50.239655°N 4.493808°E	93088-CLT-0010-01 Info	Kerk Saint-Remi: eerste drie traveeën van de beuken, transept en koor
Chapel of Saint-Feuillen ^{(nl)} ^{(fr)}		Walcourt		50.263320°N 4.366202°E	93088-CLT-0011-01 Info	
Ensemble of the chapel of the Notre-Dame de l'Assomption and environment in the hamlet Fairoul ^{(nl)} ^{(fr)}		Walcourt		50.253978°N 4.486975°E	93088-CLT-0012-01 Info	Ensemble van kapel Notre-Dame de l'Assomption en omgeving in het gehucht Fairoul
Old mill of Thy-le-Château: facades, roofs and internal machinery, establishment of a protection zone ^{(nl)} ^{(fr)}		Walcourt		50.276658°N 4.408511°E	93088-CLT-0013-01 Info	
Ensemble with Saint-Materne Basilica, except the organ ^{(nl)} ^{(fr)}		Walcourt		50.251557°N 4.432070°E	93088-PEX-0001-01 Info	

== See also ==
- List of protected heritage sites in Namur (province)
- Walcourt
