= Paul Bouttiau =

Belgian footballer

Personal information
- Date of birth: 10 September 1887
- Place of birth: Thy-le-Château, Belgium
- Date of death: 11 July 1916 (aged 28)
- Place of death: Calais, France

International career
Years	Team	Apps	(Gls)
1910	Belgium	4	(0)

Paul Philippe Marie Joseph Bouttiau (French pronunciation: [pɔl filip maʁi ʒozɛf butjo]; 10 September 1887 – 11 July 1916) was a Belgian footballer. He played in four matches for the Belgium national football team in 1910.

== Personal life and death ==
Bouttiau was son of Paulin Philippe Anton Joseph Bouttiau and his wife Alice Marie Alexandrine (nee Delobbe). He married Laure Elise Semetier. He was living in Liege, Belgium when he was mobilised in the Belgian Army in World War I. He died while serving, exiled in Calais, on 11 July 1916 aged 28. He is buried at the Municipal Cemetery in Thy-le-Château, Belgium.
