= Four Comely Saints =

The Four Comely Saints (Irish: an Ceathrar Álainn) is a collective name for Fursey, Brendan of Birr, Conall, and Berchán, four saints in the early Irish Christian church.

At their reputed burial place on Inishmore is a ruined fifteenth-century church dedicated to them. A reputed miraculous cure at the adjacent holy well inspired John Millington Synge's play The Well of the Saints.
