= Sart-Saint-Laurent =

Section of Fosses-la-Ville, Wallonia, Belgium

Coordinates: 50°24′N 4°45′E

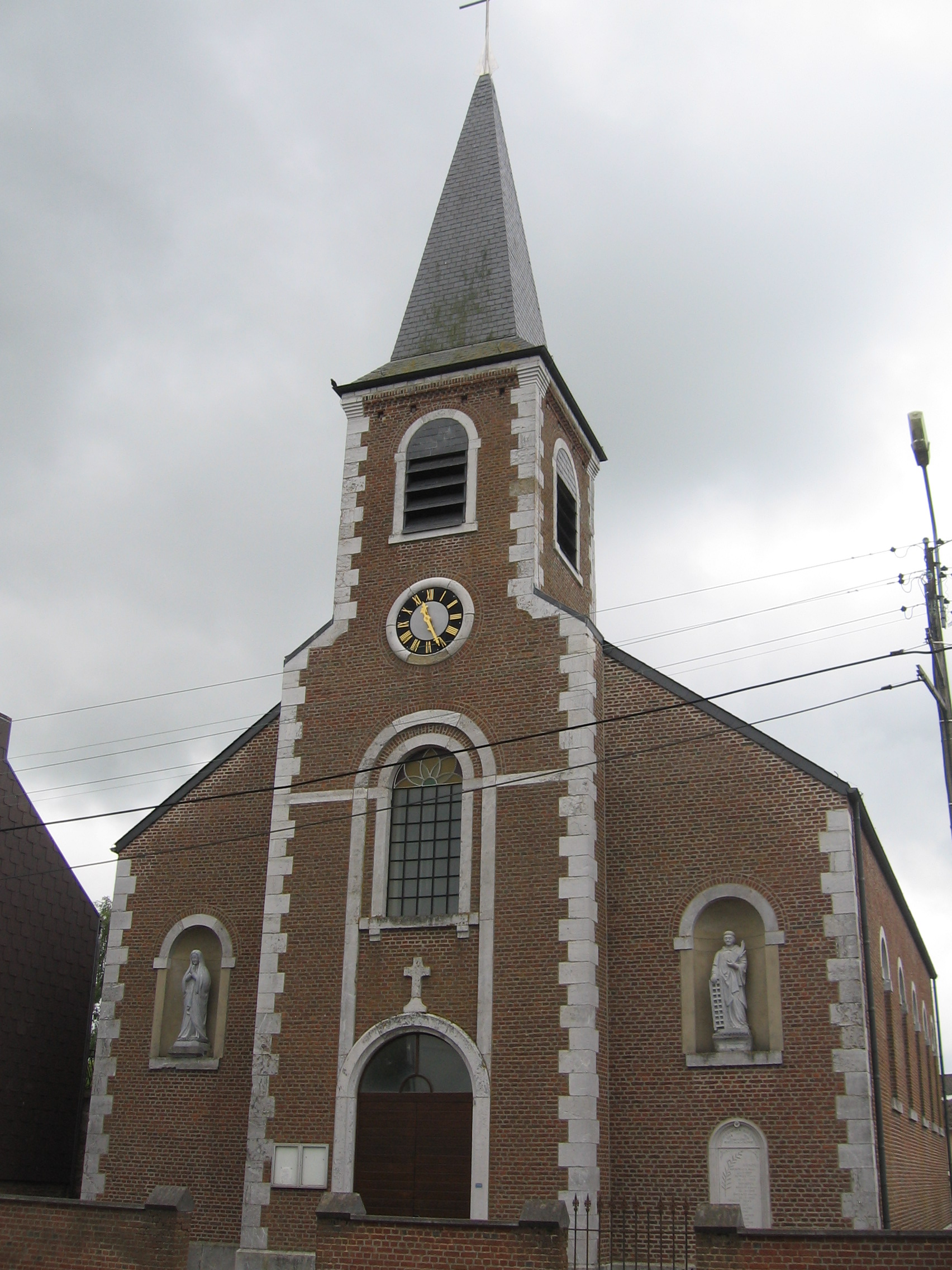
Saint-Laurent church in Sart-Saint-Laurent

Sart-Saint-Laurent (Walloon: Li Sårt-Sint-Lorint) is a village of Wallonia and a district of the municipality Fosses-la-Ville, located in the province of Namur, Belgium.

The village has a few streets of houses and is mostly surrounded by small farms and forests. The closest train station to the village is that of Floreffe, from there it is only a short ride into Namur. Many high school aged students from the village attend schools in and around Namur. University students sometimes study in nearby Namur, but many rural Belgians will prefer to study in Brussels and other parts of the country while renting a kot (a small flat). Recently, a commercial center has developed in Sart-Saint-Laurent, as the larger Fosses-la-Ville, has a dearth of shopping options.

Each year in the village, participants perform Saint Lawrence March (la Marche de Saint-Laurent), a folkloric tradition in which participants bless their weapon by soaking the butt of their weapon, or the pole of the flag they will carry in the fountain of Saint Lawrence, a tradition since 1963. Respectively, the village of Saint-Pierre (Saint Peter) performs the march of Saint Laurent.

== History ==
In the 1960s, the farmer José Genin discovered 56 artifacts and fragments while plowing in a field called Terre Mélin over the area of a hectare. Eighteen of the artifacts were dated back to the Neolithic period.
