= Chastrès =

Section of Walcourt, Wallonia, Belgium

Chastrès Tchestrè (Walloon)
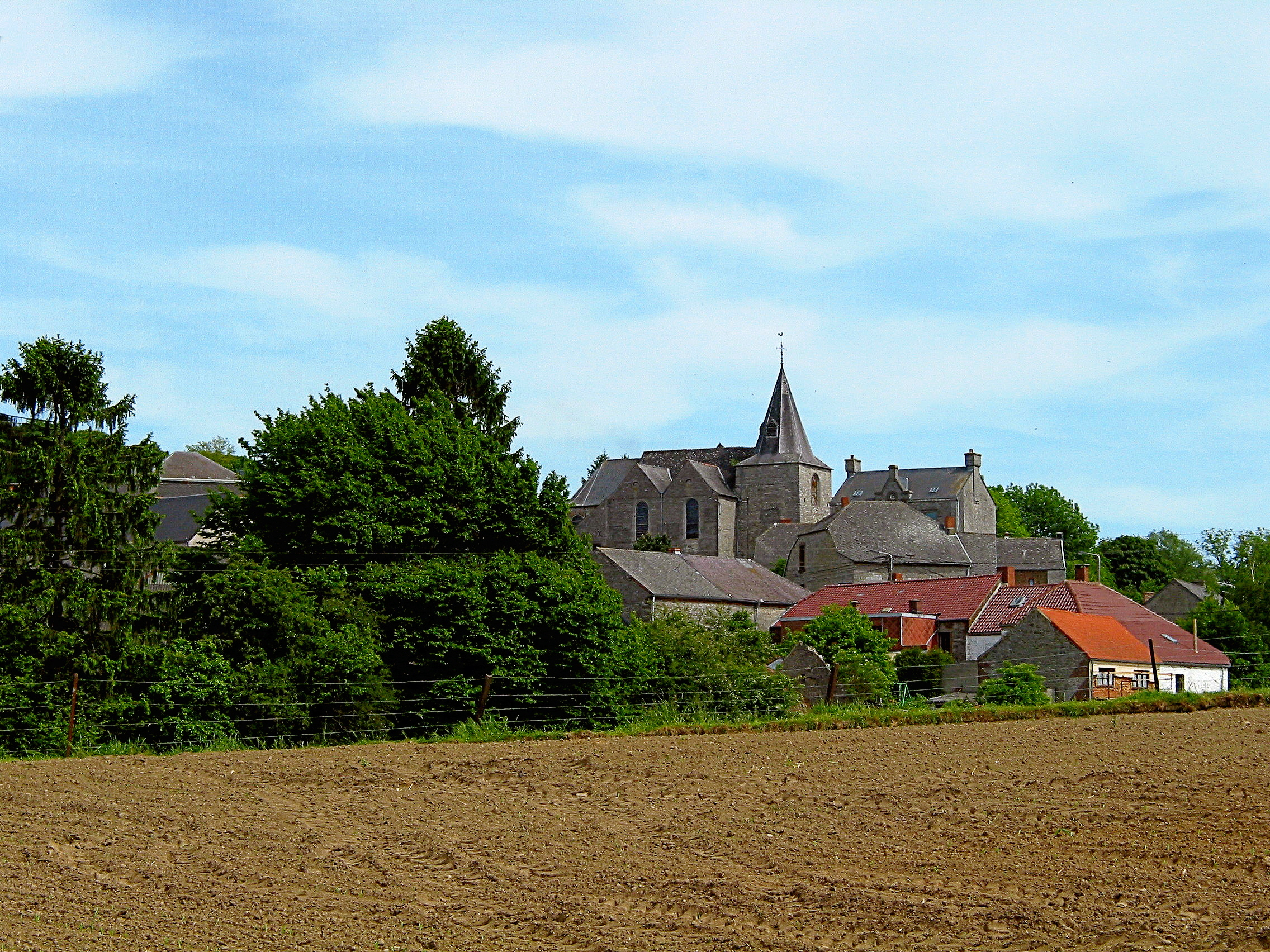
- Chastrès

- Location within Belgium Location within Europe
- Coordinates: 50°15′54″N 04°27′36″E
- Country: Belgium
- Region: Wallonia
- Province: Namur
- Municipality: Walcourt

Chastrès (Walloon: Tchestrè) is a village of Wallonia and a district of the municipality of Walcourt, located in the province of Namur, Belgium.

Chastrès is located by the ancient Roman road connecting Bavay and Trier. In 868, the village is mentioned as having certain obligations toward Lobbes Abbey. From the 12th century, the village was part of the holdings of the Count of Namur. It remained a dependency of the county until the French Revolution. The village church has Romanesque foundations, but has been rebuilt during the 16th and 19th centuries.
