= Killursa =

- Cill Fhursa
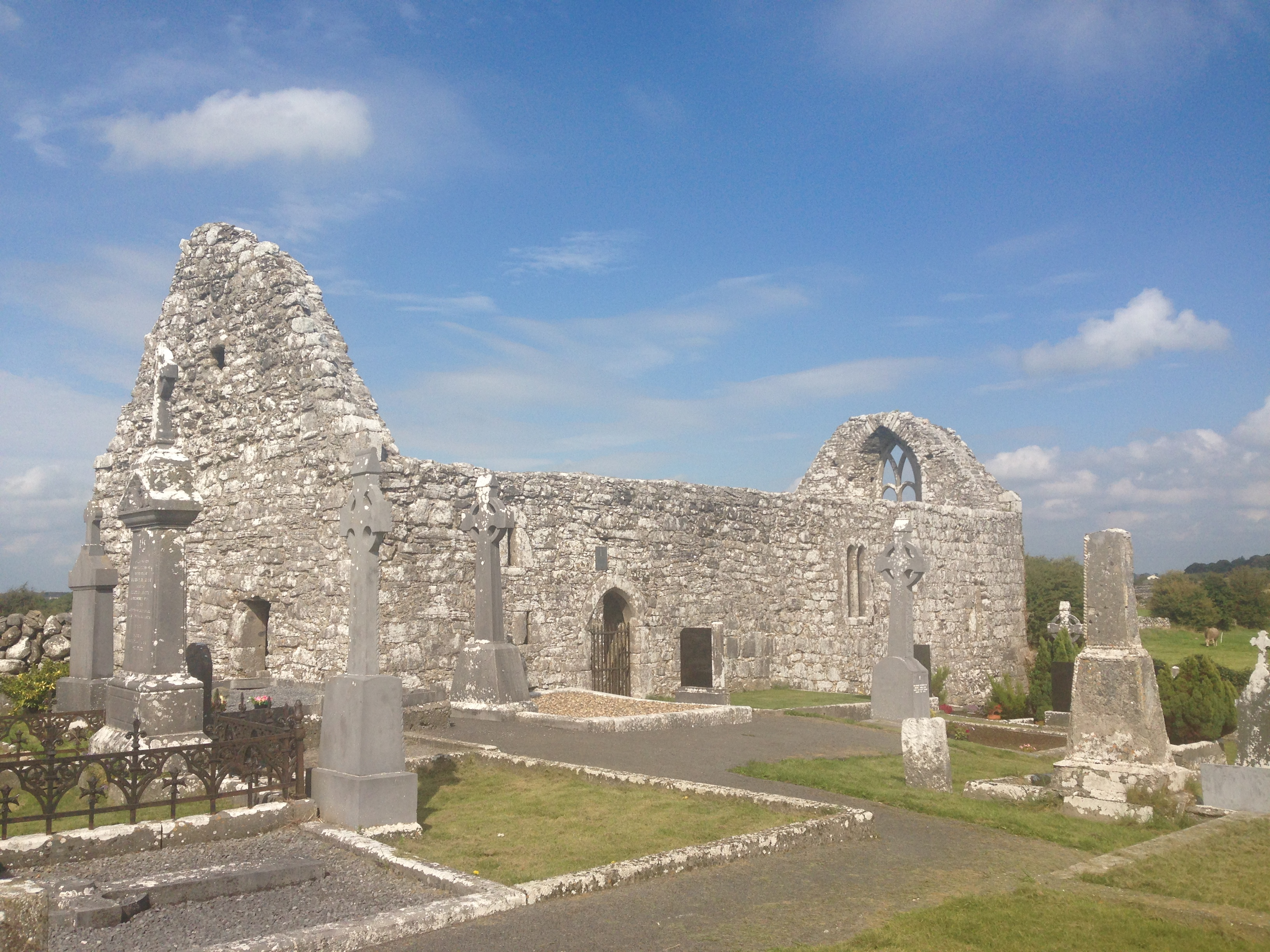

- Location within Ireland
- 53.467762°N 9.144907°W
- Location: Ower, Headford, County Galway
- Country: Ireland
- Denomination: Catholic (pre-Reformation)

History
- Former name: Kildaree Church
- Dedication: Saint Fursey

Architecture
- Functional status: ruined
- Style: Anglo-Norman
- Years built: 12th century AD

Specifications
- Length: 22.5 m (74 ft)
- Width: 7 m (23 ft)

Administration
- Diocese: Tuam

National monument of Ireland
- Official name: Killursa
- Reference no.: 231

Killursa is a medieval ruined church located in County Galway, Ireland. The name comes from the Irish ‘Cill Fhursa’, meaning “the church of Fursa”. St. Fursa was a 7th-century saint who is thought to have established a monastery on this site. The church building dates to the 12th century and was designed in the Romanesque style. It is surrounded by a large burial ground containing a combination of older and more modern graves. It is still in use today. The site is a protected national monument.

== Description ==
The roofless, ruined church and large burial ground are located approximately 1.5 miles (2.4 km) west of Headford, north of Galway city, in Ireland. The building is rectangular in layout, measuring 22.5 m (74 ft) in length and 7 m (23 ft) in width. Designed in the Romanesque style, it contains some interesting architectural details including a mullioned Late Gothic window and trabeate doorway. There is a stone altar on the east end.

The graveyard contains a combination of old and modern gravestones. Some of the more interesting graves include carved Celtic crosses and symbols and inscriptions in Irish and Latin. Many of the surviving gravestones date from the 18th century. There is a statue of St. Fursa near the entrance to the graveyard.

== History ==
A monastery is believed to have been founded in the 7th century on this site or nearby, on the shore of Lough Corrib by Saint Fursa. Saint Fursa was legendary in medieval literature for his visions of angels and the afterlife. The church dates from the 12th or 13th century. It was formally known as "Furnee". The church was probably used until the 18th century when it was abandoned and fell into ruin.

== See also ==
- Clonfert Cathedral
- Drumacoo
