= Castle of Tarcienne =

Castle in Namur Province, Belgium

- Walcourt, Wallonia, Belgium
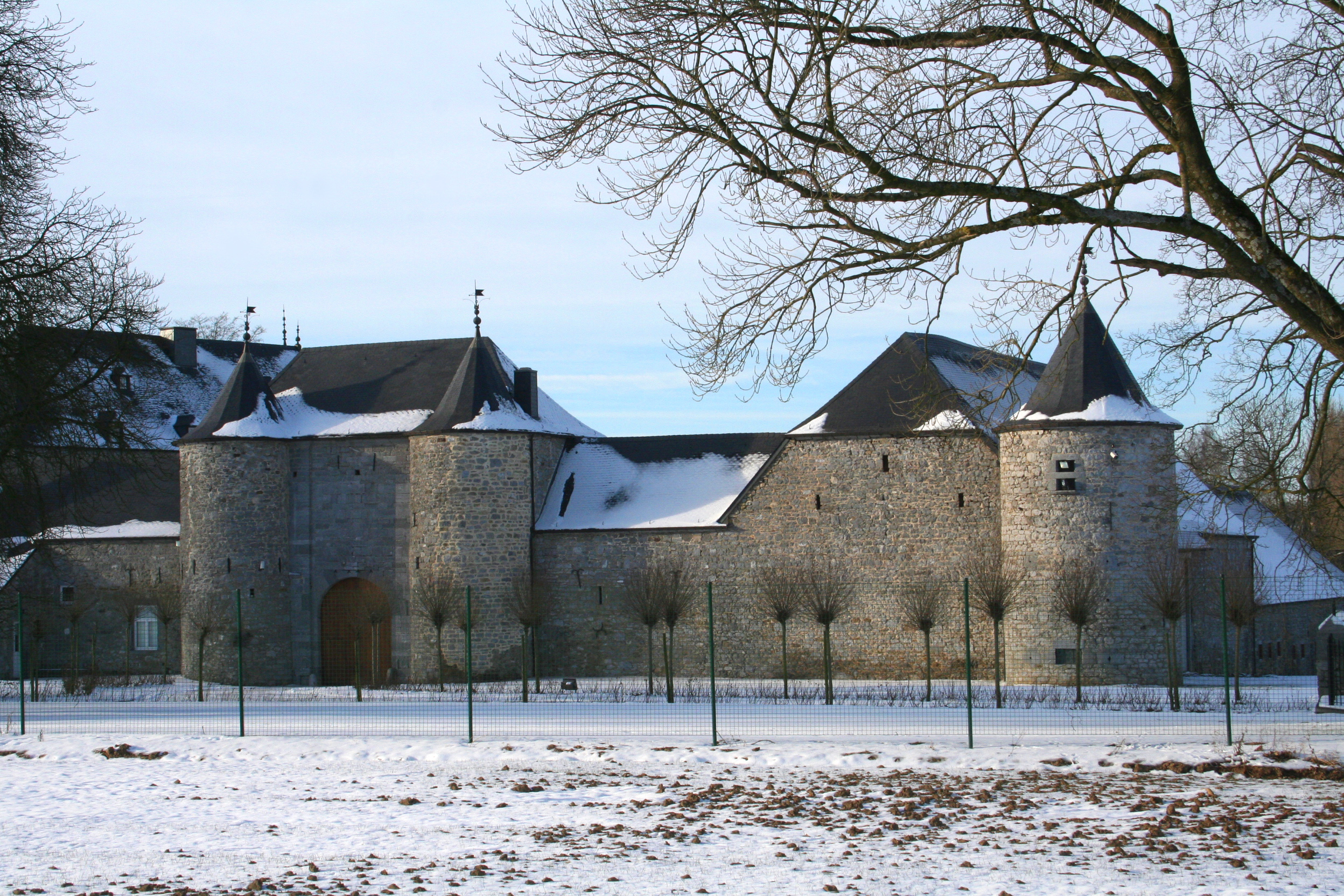

Site information
- Type: Castle

Location
- Coordinates: 50.310°N 4.496°E

Castle of Tarcienne is a castle on a slight hilltop in the western portion of the Walloon village of Tarcienne, in the municipality of Walcourt, Namur Province, Belgium.

It was initially constructed in 1674 for Charles-Ignace de Colins. Its style was Louis XIV.

At present the castle is occupied by Eric Rosens, who is working to restore it to its previous state. It is not presently open to the public.

== See also ==
- List of castles in Belgium
