= Mézerolles =

- Commune
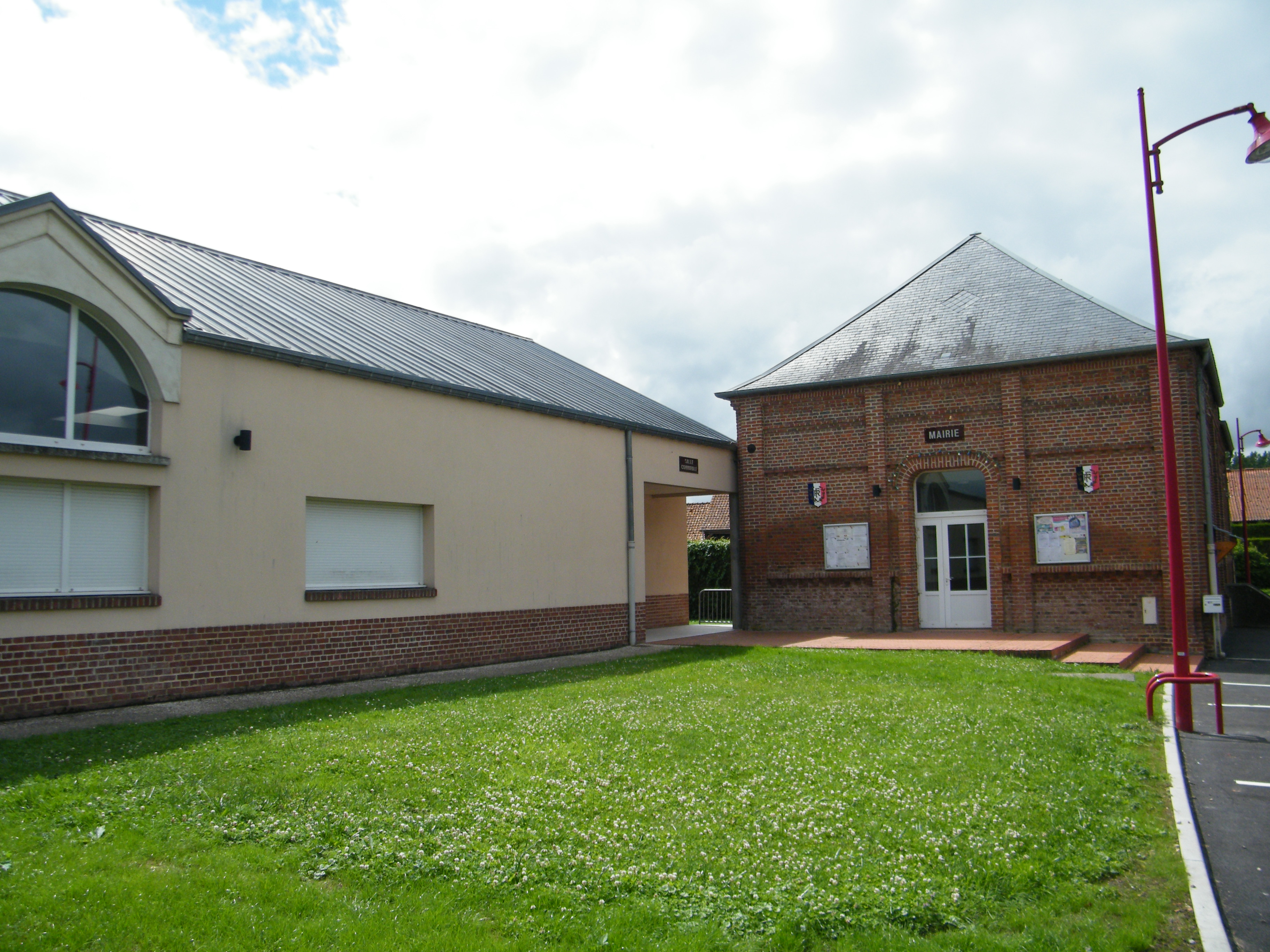
- The town hall in Mézerolles

- Coat of arms
- Location of Mézerolles
- Location within France Location within Hauts-de-France
- Coordinates: 50°11′18″N 2°14′08″E
- Country: France
- Region: Hauts-de-France
- Department: Somme
- Arrondissement: Amiens
- Canton: Doullens
- Intercommunality: CC Territoire Nord Picardie

Government
  - Mayor (2020–2026): Guy Delannoy
- Area^{1}: 6.44 km^{2} (2.49 sq mi)
- Elevation: 48 m (157 ft)
- Highest elevation: 116 m (381 ft)
- Lowest elevation: 41 m (135 ft)
- Population (2023): 184
  - Density: 28.6/km^{2} (74.0/sq mi)
- Time zone: UTC+01:00 (CET)
  - Summer (DST): UTC+02:00 (CEST)
- INSEE/Postal code: 80544 /80600
- ^{1} French Land Register data, which excludes lakes, ponds, glaciers > 1 km^{2} (0.386 sq mi or 247 acres) and river estuaries.

Mézerolles (French pronunciation: [mɛzʁɔl]; Picard: Mézrole) is a commune in the Somme department in Hauts-de-France in northern France.

== Geography ==
The commune is situated on the D938 road, some 21 miles (34 km) northeast of Abbeville, by the banks of the river Authie.

== History ==
Saint Fursey died here around 650.

== Population ==
Historical population
Year	Pop.	±% p.a.
1968	155	—
1975	140	−1.44%
1982	155	+1.46%
1990	160	+0.40%
1999	165	+0.34%
2007	199	+2.37%
2012	194	−0.51%
2017	188	−0.63%
2023	184	−0.36%
Source: INSEE

== See also ==
- Communes of the Somme department
