= Thy-le-Château =

Thy-le-Château Tî-l'-Tchestea (Walloon)
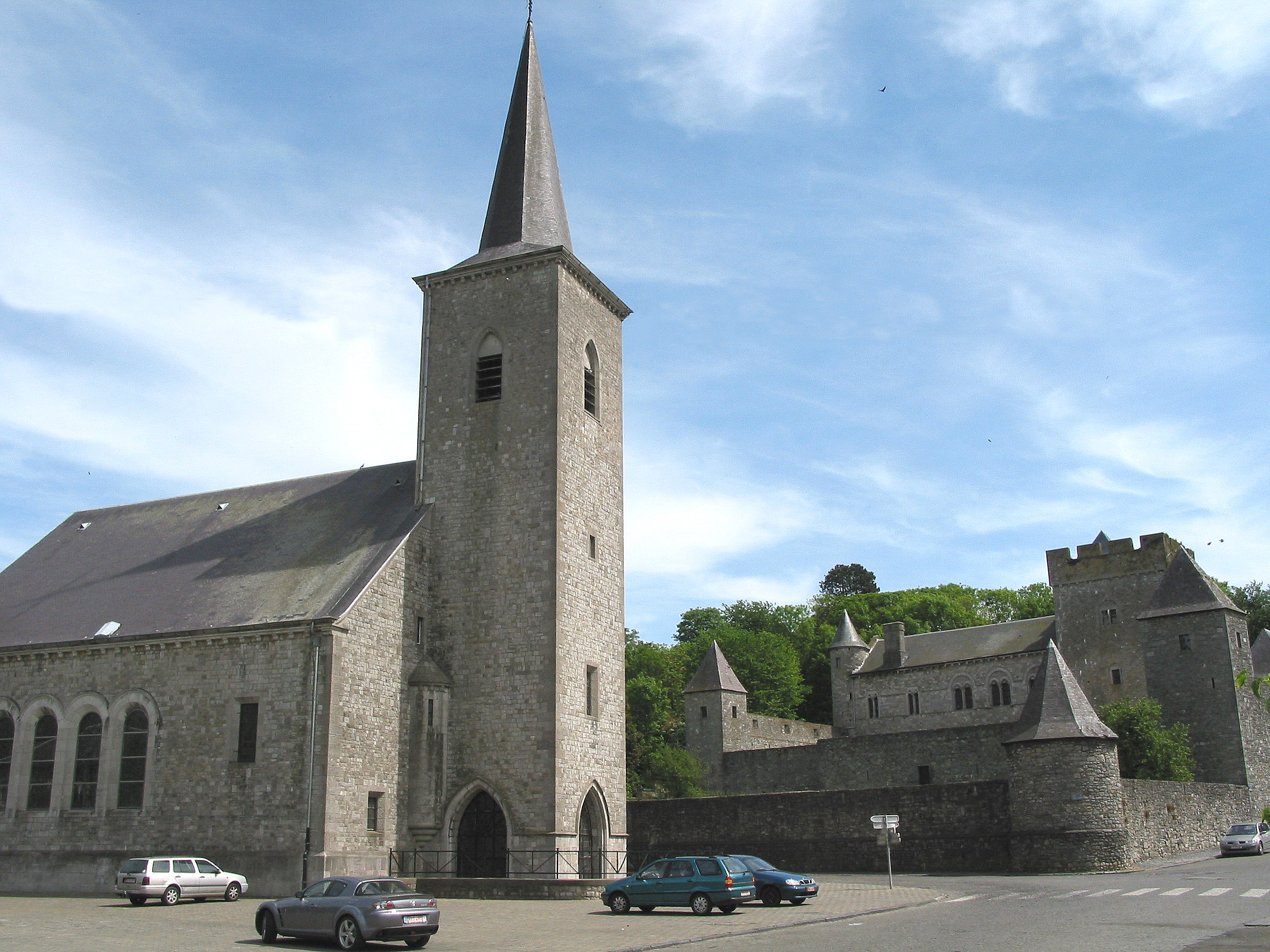
- Thy-le-Château, village church and castle

- Location within Belgium Location within Europe
- Coordinates: 50°16′58″N 04°25′33″E
- Country: Belgium
- Region: Wallonia
- Province: Namur
- Municipality: Walcourt

Thy-le-Château (French pronunciation: [ti lə ʃato], lit. 'Thy the Castle'; Walloon: Tî-l'-Tchestea) is a village of Wallonia and a district of the municipality of Walcourt, located in the province of Namur, Belgium.

The village is mentioned for the first time in the archives of Lobbes Abbey in the 9th century. In 1190 it passed from the abbey to the Count of Hainaut. During the following centuries, the holding often switched owner and belonged to several of the most illustrious noble families of the region. From the 17th century, the village developed a metalworking industry. The village centre is dominated by the castle of Thy-le-Château, a large edifice which dates back to the 12th century.

== Notable people ==
Paul Bouttiau (1887–1916) - Belgian international footballer, died in World War I, born and buried at Thy.
