= Chapel of Saint Brigid =

Roman Catholic chapel in Belgium

Chapel of Saint Brigid, Fosses-la-Ville
- Chapelle Sainte-Brigide de Fosses-la-Ville
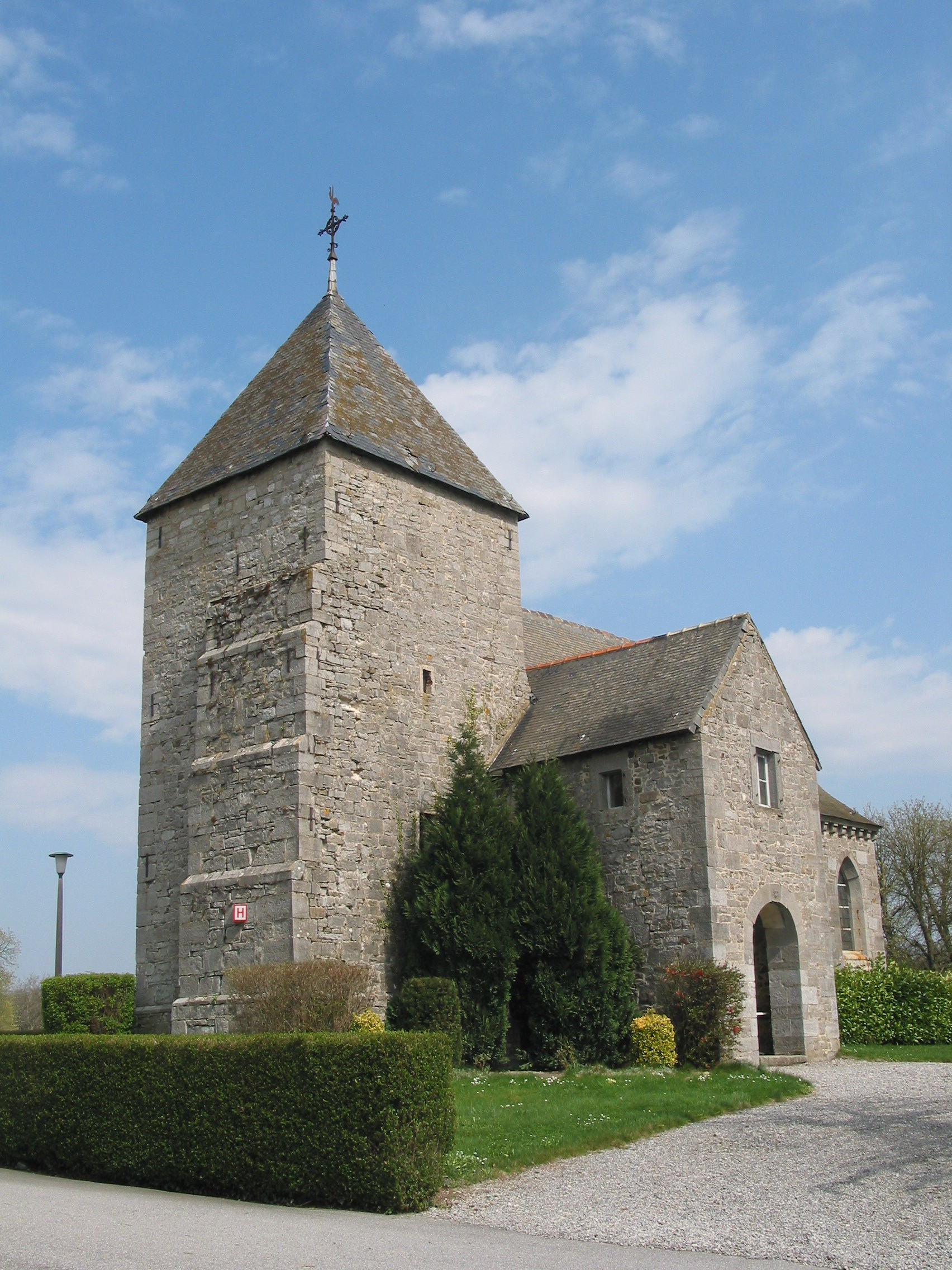

- Location
- 50°24′02″N 4°41′56″E
- Denomination: Roman Catholic

Architecture
- Style: Romanesque

Specifications
- Materials: Limestone

Administration
- Diocese: Namur
- Parish: Cathedral

The Chapel of Saint Brigid (French: Chapelle Sainte-Brigide de Fosses-la-Ville) is an 11th-century chapel overlooking the town of Fosses-la-Ville, province of Namur, Belgium. This large and ancient chapel is placed under the protection of Saint Brigid, an Irish nun.

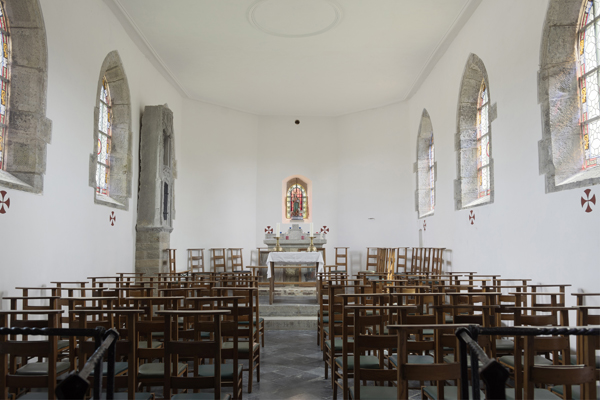
Interior

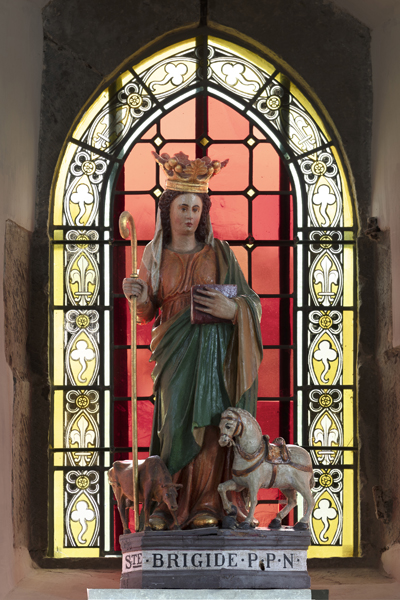
Saint Brigid

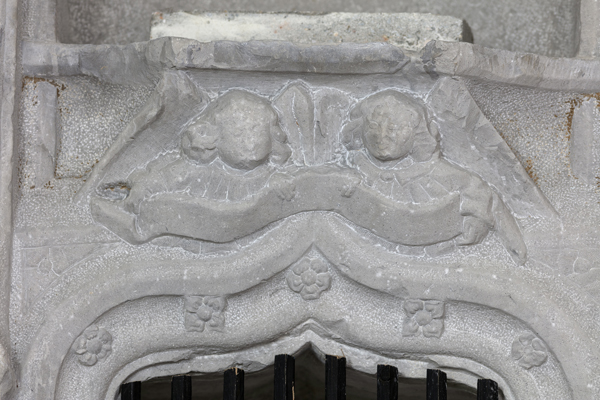
Tabernacle

== Sources ==
- RTBF.be: Fosses la ville: la restauration de Sainte-Brigide assure la transmission du savoir-faire des tailleurs de pierre, 18 May 2022
- Diocese of Namur: A Fosses-la-Ville, la statue de sainte Brigide passe de ferme en ferme, 5 May 2020
- LeSoir.be: Fosses-la-Ville; Un folklore celtique remontant au VII esiècle. Les pèlerins apprêtent leurs baguettes, Luc Scharès, 5 May 2001
- Atelier-arc.eu: Chapelle Sainte-Brigide (Namur)
- LaNouvelleGazette-sambre-meuse.sudinfo.be: 360.000 euros pour la restauration globale de la chapelle Sainte-Brigide à Fosses, 7 December 2021
