= Walcourt =

City in Wallonia, Belgium

Walcourt Walcoû (Walloon)
- City and municipality
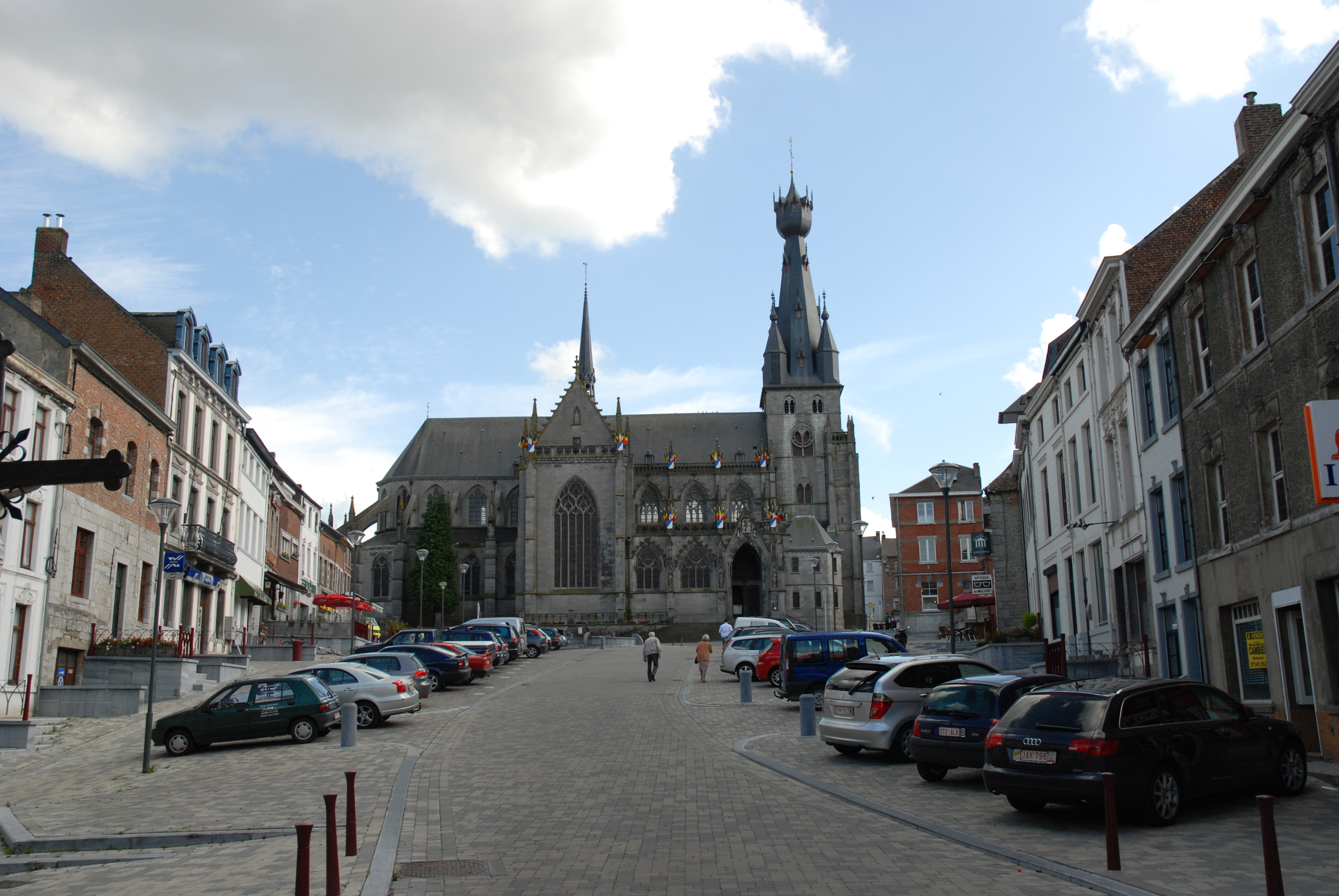
- Walcourt centre with the Basilica of Saint Maternus

- Flag Coat of arms

- Location of Walcourt in the province of Namur
- Interactive map of Walcourt
- Location in Belgium
- Coordinates: 50°15′N 04°25′E
- Country: Belgium
- Community: French Community
- Region: Wallonia
- Province: Namur
- Arrondissement: Philippeville

Government
  - Mayor: Christine Poulin (PS)
  - Governing party: PS - MR

Area
  - Total: 123.64 km^{2} (47.74 sq mi)

Population (2018-01-01)
  - Total: 18,376
  - Density: 148.63/km^{2} (384.94/sq mi)
- Postal codes: 5650, 5651
- NIS code: 93088
- Area codes: 071
- Website: www.walcourt.be

Walcourt (French pronunciation: [walkuʁ]; Walloon: Walcoû) is a municipality and city of Wallonia located in the province of Namur, Belgium.

On 1 January 2006, the municipality had 17,516 inhabitants. The total area is 123.18 km^{2}, giving a population density of 142 inhabitants per km^{2}.

The municipality consists of the following districts: Berzée, Castillon, Chastrès, Clermont, Fontenelle, Fraire, Gourdinne, Laneffe, Pry, Rognée, Somzée, Tarcienne, Thy-le-Château, Vogenée, Walcourt, Yves-Gomezée.

== History ==
The Basilica of Saint Maternus is a Gothic minor basilica, founded in 1026. It contains one of the oldest Madonnas in Western Christianity. In 1689, the Battle of Walcourt was fought here between French troops and the Grand Alliance during the Nine Years' War.

== See also ==
- List of protected heritage sites in Walcourt
