= Fosses-la-Ville =

City in Wallonia, Belgium

Fosses-la-Ville Fosse-li-Veye (Walloon)
- Municipality
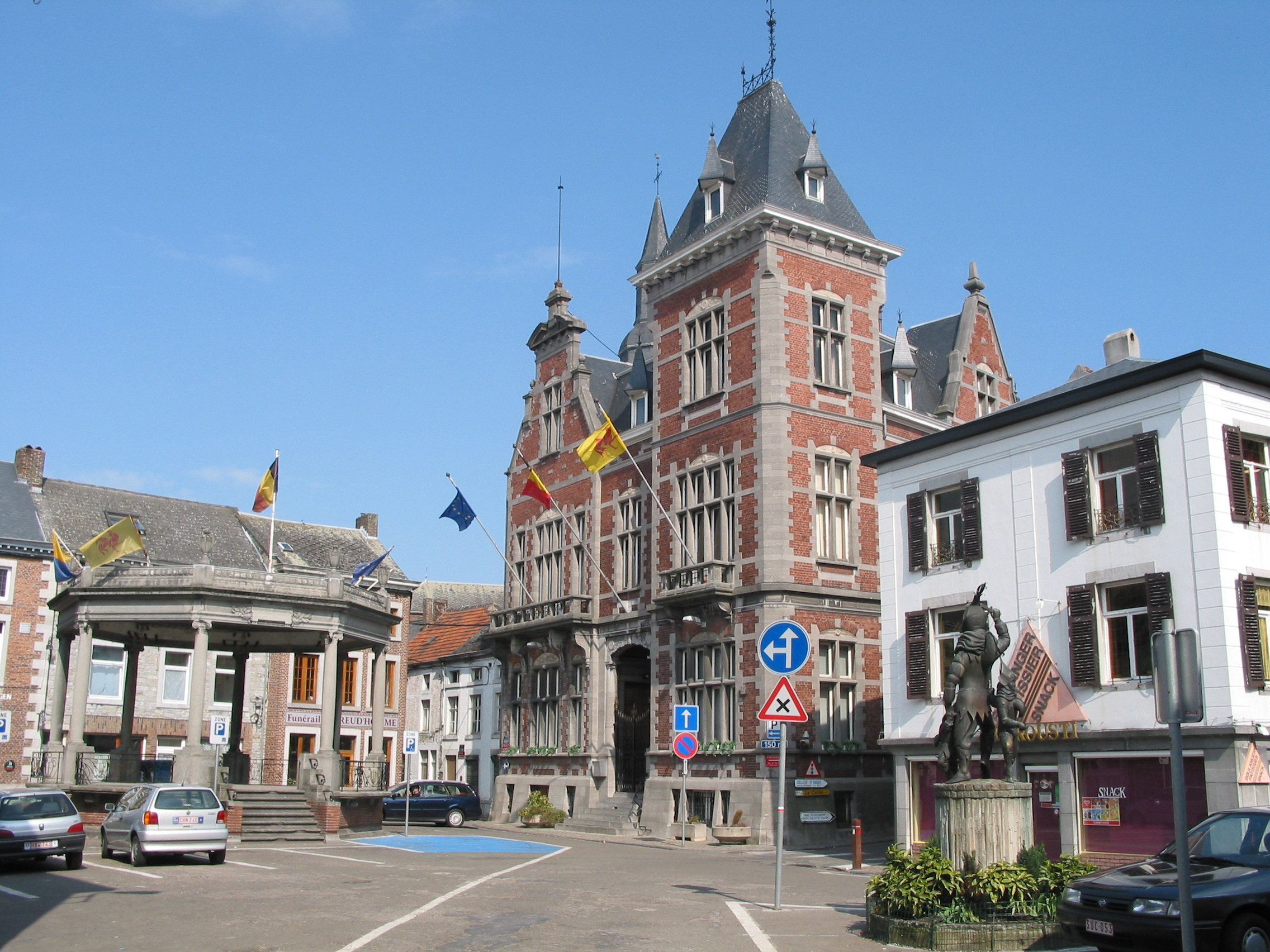
- Town square and town hall

- Flag Coat of arms

- Location of Fosses-la-Ville in Namur Province
- Interactive map of Fosses-la-Ville
- Location in Belgium
- Coordinates: 50°24′N 04°42′E
- Country: Belgium
- Community: French Community
- Region: Wallonia
- Province: Namur
- Arrondissement: Namur

Government
  - Mayor: Gaëtan De Bilderling (UD)
  - Governing party: Union Démocratique (UD)

Area
  - Total: 63.31 km^{2} (24.44 sq mi)

Population (2018-01-01)
  - Total: 10,449
  - Density: 165.0/km^{2} (427.5/sq mi)
- Postal codes: 5070
- NIS code: 92048
- Area codes: 071
- Website: www.fosses-la-ville.be

Fosses-la-Ville (French pronunciation: [fos la vil]; Walloon: Fosse-li-Veye) is a city and municipality of Wallonia located in the province of Namur, Belgium.

On January 1, 2018, Fosses-la-Ville had a total population of 10,449. The total area is 63.24 km^{2} which gives a population density of 165 inhabitants per km^{2}.

The municipality consists of the following districts: Aisemont, Fosses, Le Roux, Sart-Eustache, Sart-Saint-Laurent, and Vitrival.

== Main sights ==
- Collegiate Church of Saint Foillan, rebuilt in the 18th century. It has Romanesque tower and westwork from the 10th century.
- Chapelle Sainte-Brigide, a small sanctuary built by Irish monks, dedicated to Brigid of Kildare

== Twin towns ==
- Orbey, France
- Robecco sul Naviglio, Italy

== Gallery ==
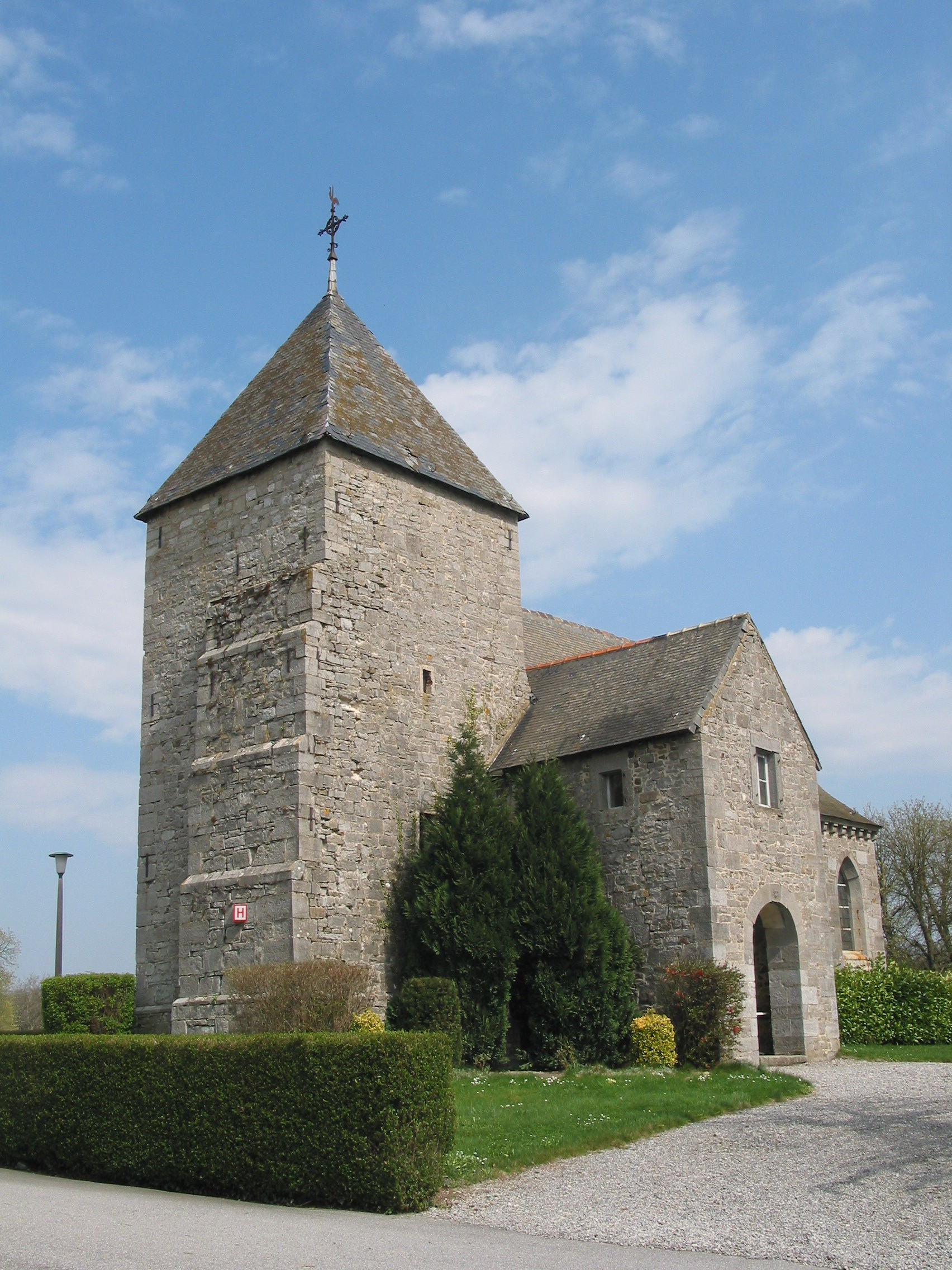
Brigit of Kildare's chapel in Fosses-la-Ville

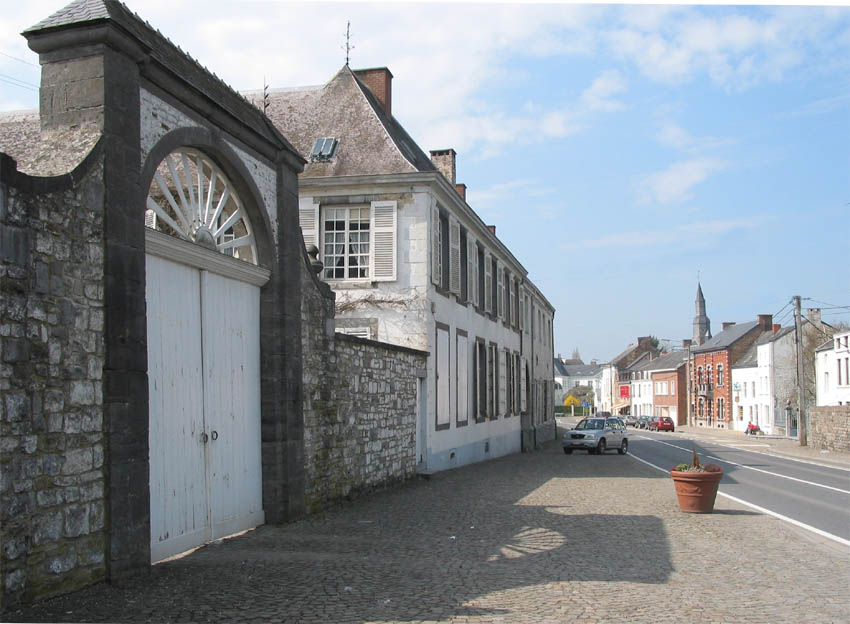
Route N922, entry of the town Fosses-la-ville

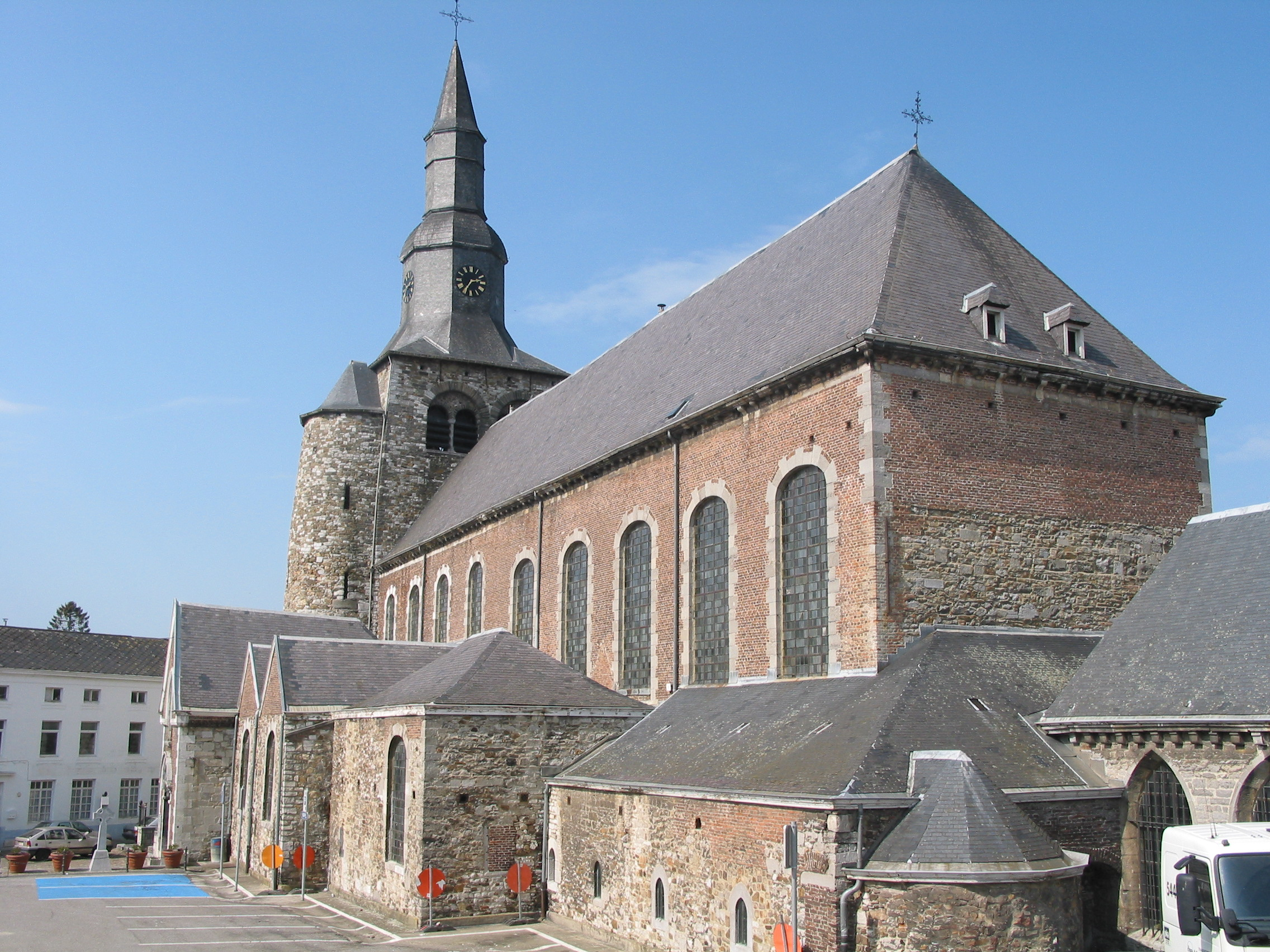
Collegiate Church of Saint Foillan

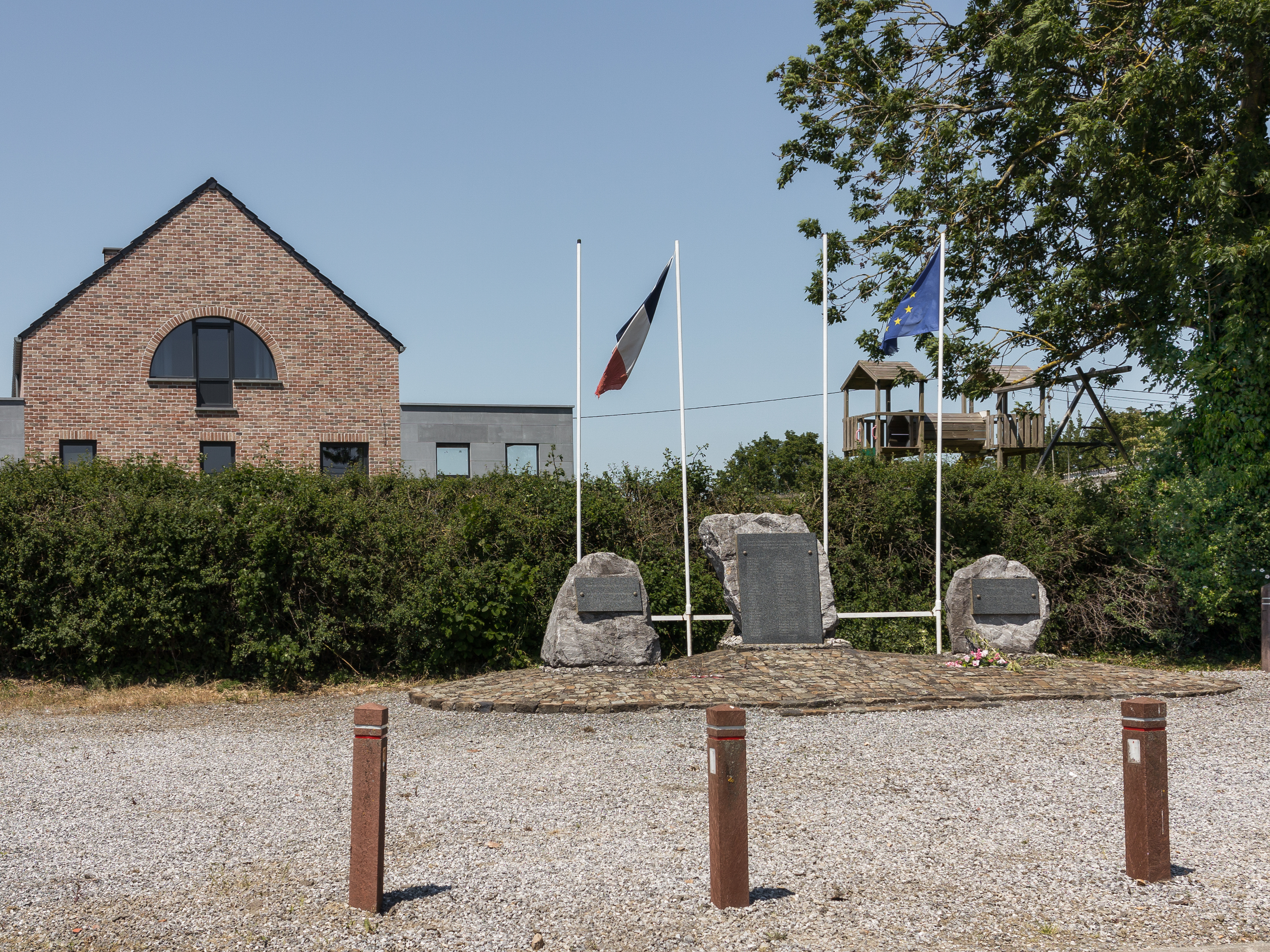
War memorial in Le Roux
