= N5 road (Belgium) =

Road in Belgium

Coordinates: 50.40023°N 4.45276°E

National Route 5
- Dutch: Nationale Weg 5 French: Route nationale 5
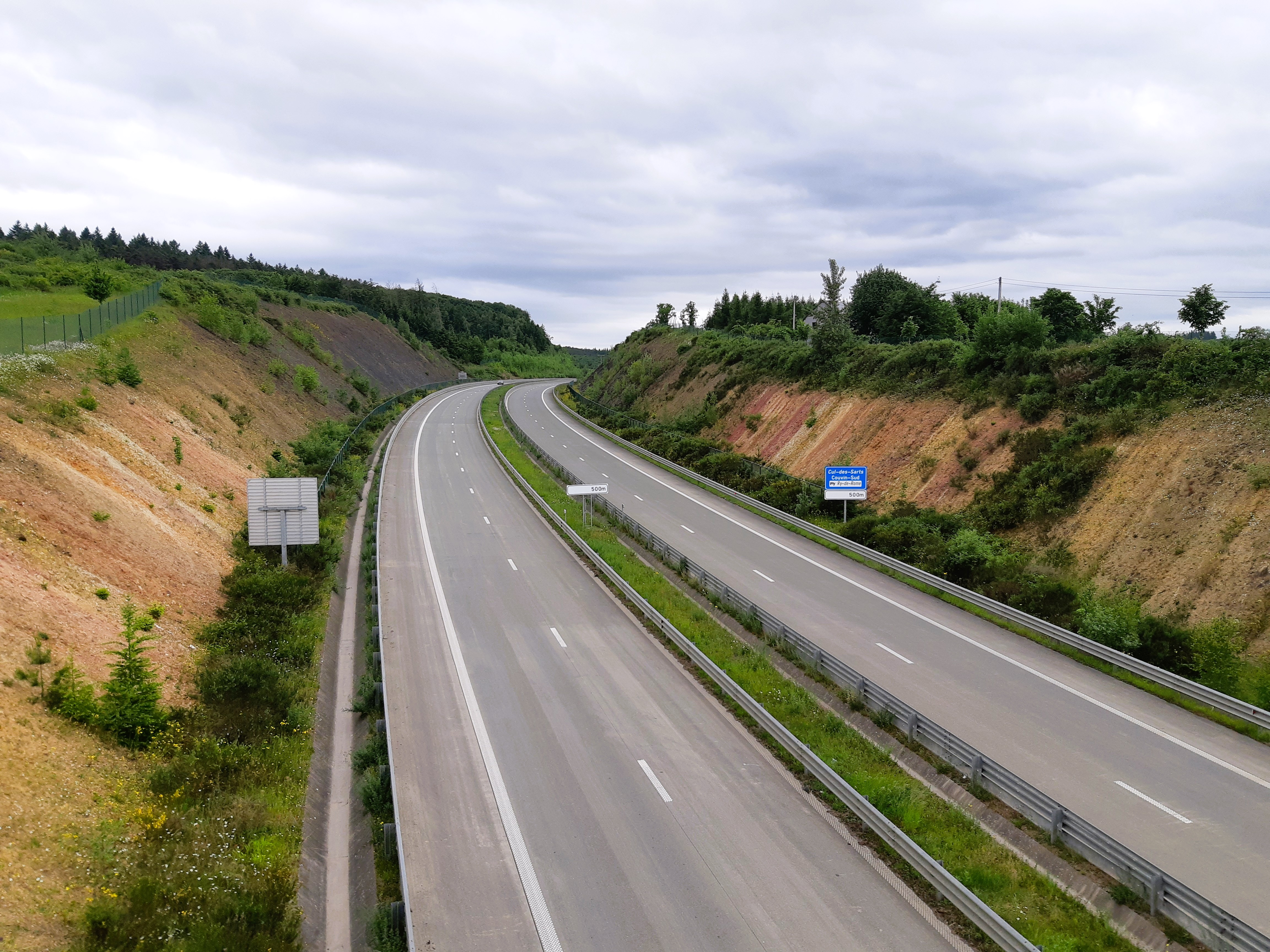
- N5 near Couvin

Route information
- Length: 105 km (65 mi)

Major junctions
- From: Brussels
- To: Couvin

Location
- Country: Belgium

Highway system
- Highways of Belgium; Motorways; National Roads

The N5 is a road in Belgium connecting the small ring in Brussels and Philippeville via Charleroi (commonly named French: Route de Philippeville as far as the ring of Charleroi).

This road could be one of the deadliest of the country. This is not only due to the traffic density and the old fashioned road safety features, but also because many country roads are joining onto a high speed lane, namely the tractors harvesting sugar beet.

The road featured in the history of Belgium: during the Battle of Waterloo, the Imperial French Army used this path to join the battlefield of Quatre-Bras/Ligny. (Note: For a detailed count of wounded persons using this road, see orders of battle from Quatre-Bras, Ligny, Order of Battle of the Waterloo Campaign, and statistics related to road safety from the Institut belge pour la sécurité routière (IBSR).)

== Route ==
The N5 crosses or borders 17 municipalities in total. 4 municipalities are located in the Brussels Capital Region, 1 in Flemish Brabant, 5 in Walloon Brabant, 4 in Hainaut and 3 in Namur. Full municipality list below, main municipalities are in bold.

Region	Province	Municipality	Population	Length of N5 (km)
Brussels Capital Region	/	**City of Brussels**	188737	1.0
Brussels Capital Region	/	Saint-Gilles	48837	1.5
Brussels Capital Region	/	Ixelles	87052	1.1
Brussels Capital Region	/	Uccle	85099	6.2
Flanders	Flemish Brabant	Sint-Genesius-Rode	18628	3.5
Wallonia	Walloon Brabant	**Waterloo**	30356	6.2
Wallonia	Walloon Brabant	**Braine-l'Alleud**	40346	0.3
Wallonia	Walloon Brabant	Lasne	14299	3.3
Wallonia	Walloon Brabant	Genappe	15611	12.1
Wallonia	Walloon Brabant	Villers-la-Ville	10970	0.1
Wallonia	Hainaut	Les Bons Villers	9510	7.1
Wallonia	Hainaut	**Charleroi**	202421	13.4
Wallonia	Hainaut	Gerpinnes	12771	5.8
Wallonia	Hainaut	Ham-sur-Heure-Nalinnes	13725	1.9
Wallonia	Namur	Walcourt	18429	12.0
Wallonia	Namur	Philippeville	9243	12.9
Wallonia	Namur	**Couvin**	13871	20.6

== Junction list ==
Province	Municipality	Section	Junction	Northbound destinations	Southbound destinations
(European Union) (Belgium) Brussels-capital Region	City of Brussels	Brussels- Uccle	Brussels (188.737 inh.) R20 Brussels inner ring road	Brussels	Waterloo Charleroi
(European Union) (Belgium) Brussels-capital Region	Saint-Gilles	Brussels- Uccle	Saint-Gilles (48.837 inh.) N242 Kastelijn N261 Louiza, Uccle	Brussels	Waterloo Charleroi
(European Union) (Belgium) Brussels-capital Region	Ixelles	Brussels- Uccle	/	Brussels	Waterloo Charleroi
(European Union) (Belgium) Brussels-capital Region	City of Brussels / Uccle	Brussels- Uccle	The N5 forms the border between the City of Brussels and Uccle. N241 Churchill, Saint-Gilles, Forest	Brussels	Waterloo Charleroi
(European Union) (Belgium) Brussels-capital Region	Uccle	Brussels- Uccle	R22 Auderghem, Woluwe-Saint-Pierre, Zaventem, Brussels Airport	Brussels	Waterloo Charleroi
(European Union) (Belgium) Flanders Flemish Brabant	Sint-Genesius-Rode	Sint-Genesius-Rode	Sint-Genesius-Rode (18.628 inh.)	Brussels	Waterloo Charleroi
(European Union) (Belgium) Wallonia Walloon Brabant	Waterloo	Waterloo - Genappe	Waterloo (30.356 inh.)	Brussels	Charleroi
(European Union) (Belgium) Wallonia Walloon Brabant	Braine-l'Alleud / Waterloo	Waterloo - Genappe	The N5 forms the border between Braine-l'Alleud and Waterloo. N253 La Hulpe, Overijse N27 Nivelles, La Louvière	Brussels	Charleroi
(European Union) (Belgium) Wallonia Walloon Brabant	Waterloo	Waterloo - Genappe	25 R0, Brussels Ring road Brussels, Brussels Airport, Charleroi, Mons, Ghent, Antwerp, Liège	Brussels	Charleroi
(European Union) (Belgium) Wallonia Walloon Brabant	Lasne	Waterloo - Genappe	Plancenoit (1.592 inh.)	Waterloo Brussels	Charleroi
(European Union) (Belgium) Wallonia Walloon Brabant	Genappe	Waterloo - Genappe	N25 Nivelles, Ottignies-Louvain-la-Neuve, Wavre, Leuven N271 Genappe-Center, Glabais, Lasne, Rixensart N237 Court-Saint-Étienne, Nivelles Genappe (15.611 inh.) Ways (1.258 inh.) Baisy (3.147 inh.) Dernier-Patard	Waterloo Brussels	Charleroi
(European Union) (Belgium) Wallonia Walloon Brabant	Genappe / Villers-la-Ville	Waterloo - Genappe	The N5 forms the border between Genappe and Villers-la-Ville. N93 Nivelles, Villers-la-Ville, Sombreffe, Namur	Waterloo Brussels	Charleroi
(European Union) (Belgium) Wallonia Walloon Brabant	Genappe	Waterloo - Genappe	/	Waterloo Brussels	Charleroi
(European Union) (Belgium) Wallonia Hainaut	Les Bons Villers	Les Bons Villers - Charleroi	Frasnes-lez-Gosselies (3.454 inh.) Frasnes-lez-Gosselies, Villers-Perwin, Villers-la-Ville N567 Mellet, Thiméon, Fleurus	Waterloo Brussels	Charleroi
(European Union) (Belgium) Wallonia Hainaut	Charleroi	Charleroi	16 (Gosselies, Genappe) E42 Charleroi, Brussels South Charleroi Airport, Namur, Liège, La Louvière, Mons, Brussels (E420) Gosselies (10.774 inh.) N582 Gosselies, Courcelles N586 Gosselies 23 (Jumet-North) E420 Nivelles, Brussels, Mons (E42), Liège (E42) N568 Brussels South Charleroi Airport, Fleurus, Farciennes Jumet (24.585 inh.) Lodelinsart (8.459 inh.) N569 Jumet, Marchienne-Docherie, Gilly, Châtelet, Lodelinsart N585 Charleroi Hospital Dampremy (6.807 inh.) 28 R9, E420, Charleroi inner ring road Charleroi, Brussels, Namur, Mons, Couvin, Gembloux, Waterloo Charleroi (202.421 inh.) N90 Marchienne-au-Pont, Anderlues, Binche, Mons R9, E420, Charleroi inner ring road Charleroi, Brussels, Namur, Mons, Couvin, Gembloux, Waterloo Interruption by R9, E420, Charleroi Ring Road with junctions to N53 (Chimay), A503 (Marcinelle), N575 (Châtelet), N90 (Namur, Mons), N29 (Gembloux) and E420 (Brussels) 29 (Porte de la Neuville) R9, E420, Charleroi inner ring road Charleroi, Brussels, Namur, Mons, Couvin, Gembloux, Waterloo Sambre N565 Marcinelle Marcinelle (23.604 inh.) N576 Couillet, Châtelet Couillet (11.458 inh.) 8 (Couillet) R3, Grand ring de Charleroi Charleroi, Châtelet, Courcelles, Brussels South Charleroi Airport, Mons (E42), Liège (E42), Namur (E42), Brussels (E420)	Waterloo Brussels	
(European Union) (Belgium) Wallonia Hainaut	Gerpinnes	Charleroi - Ham-sur-Heure-Nalinnes	Loverval (1.855 inh.) N574 Gerpinnes, Mettet	Charleroi	Couvin France (Reims)
(European Union) (Belgium) Wallonia Hainaut	Gerpinnes / Ham-sur-Heure-Nalinnes	Charleroi - Ham-sur-Heure-Nalinnes	The N5 forms the border between Gerpinnes and Ham-sur-Heure-Nalinnes. Flaches (Gerpinnes) Bultia (Ham-sur-Heure-Nalinnes)	Charleroi	Couvin France (Reims)
(European Union) (Belgium) Wallonia Namur	Walcourt	Walcourt - Couvin	Tarcienne (2.209 inh.) Somzée (1.666 inh.) N978 Somzée, Gerpinnes, Walcourt, Cerfontaine Laneffe (2.017 inh.) Laneffe N932 Fraire, Walcourt, Mettet, Florennes Fraire (1.467 inh.) Yves-Gomezée (1.728 inh.)	Charleroi	Couvin France (Reims)
(European Union) (Belgium) Wallonia Namur	Philippeville	Walcourt - Couvin	Philippeville (only northbound) N40 Philippeville, Beaumont, Dinant, Florennes, France (Maubeuge, Givet) Philippeville (9.243 inh.) Samart, Neuville (only northbound) N978 Cerfontaine, Froidchapelle Roly	Charleroi	Couvin France (Reims)
(European Union) (Belgium) Wallonia Namur	Couvin	Walcourt - Couvin	N939 Mariembourg, Boussu-en-Fagne Mariembourg Mariembourg (2.109 inh.) Mariembourg, Frasnes-lez-Couvin Frasnes-lez-Couvin (1.230 inh.) E420 Couvin-East, France (Rocroi, Charleville-Mézières, Sedan, Reims) N99 Pesche, Chimay, France (Hirson) Couvin (13.871 inh.) N99 Petigny, Viroinval, Doische, France (Givet) N920 France (Rocroi) N964 Cul-des-Sarts, France (Auvillers-les-Forges) Brûly (419 inh.) N920 Moulin Manteau	Charleroi	France (Charleville-Mézières, Reims)
(European Union) (France) (Grand Est)	Continuation by D985 to Rocroi, Charleville-Mézières and Reims.				

== See also ==
- Transport in Belgium
