= List of protected heritage sites in Les Bons Villers =

This table shows an overview of the protected heritage sites in the Walloon town Les Bons Villers. This list is part of Belgium's national heritage.

Object	Year/architect	Town/section	Address	Coordinates	Number^{?}	Image
Domain Hutte on the territory of Bons Villers ^{(nl)} ^{(fr)}		Les Bons Villers		50.534880°N 4.480967°E	52075-CLT-0001-01 Info	
Chapel Notre-Dame du Roux ^{(nl)} ^{(fr)}		Les Bons Villers	ruelle aux Loups	50.539878°N 4.447545°E	52075-CLT-0002-01 Info	
St. Martin's Church ^{(nl)} ^{(fr)}		Les Bons Villers		50.504314°N 4.476028°E	52075-CLT-0003-01 Info	
Chambre échevinale, alderman's room ^{(nl)} ^{(fr)}		Les Bons Villers	rue de la Sainte, n°5 (M) et alentours (S).	50.533271°N 4.448931°E	52075-CLT-0005-01 Info	
High hedge situated at a place called "La Mee" along the stream ^{(nl)} ^{(fr)}		Les Bons Villers		50.524832°N 4.465002°E	52075-CLT-0007-01 Info	
Roof, walls, stairs and two intramural toilets of the medieval keep, except outbuildings. Setting conservation. ^{(nl)} ^{(fr)}		Les Bons Villers	rue A. Helsen 69 bis	50.502974°N 4.472876°E	52075-CLT-0008-01 Info	
Sites called the "Eauguernees" and the "Bons Villers" ^{(nl)} ^{(fr)}		Les Bons Villers	Villers Perwin	50.507694°N 4.440170°E	52075-CLT-0009-01 Info	
The archaeological site of Liberchies ^{(nl)} ^{(fr)}		Les Bons Villers		50.507694°N 4.440170°E	52075-PEX-0001-01 Info	

== See also ==
- List of protected heritage sites in Hainaut (province)
- Les Bons Villers
