= Brussels South =

Brussels South may refer to:

- Brussels-South railway station
- Brussels South Charleroi Airport
