= Mellet =

Coordinates: 50°30′N 4°28′E

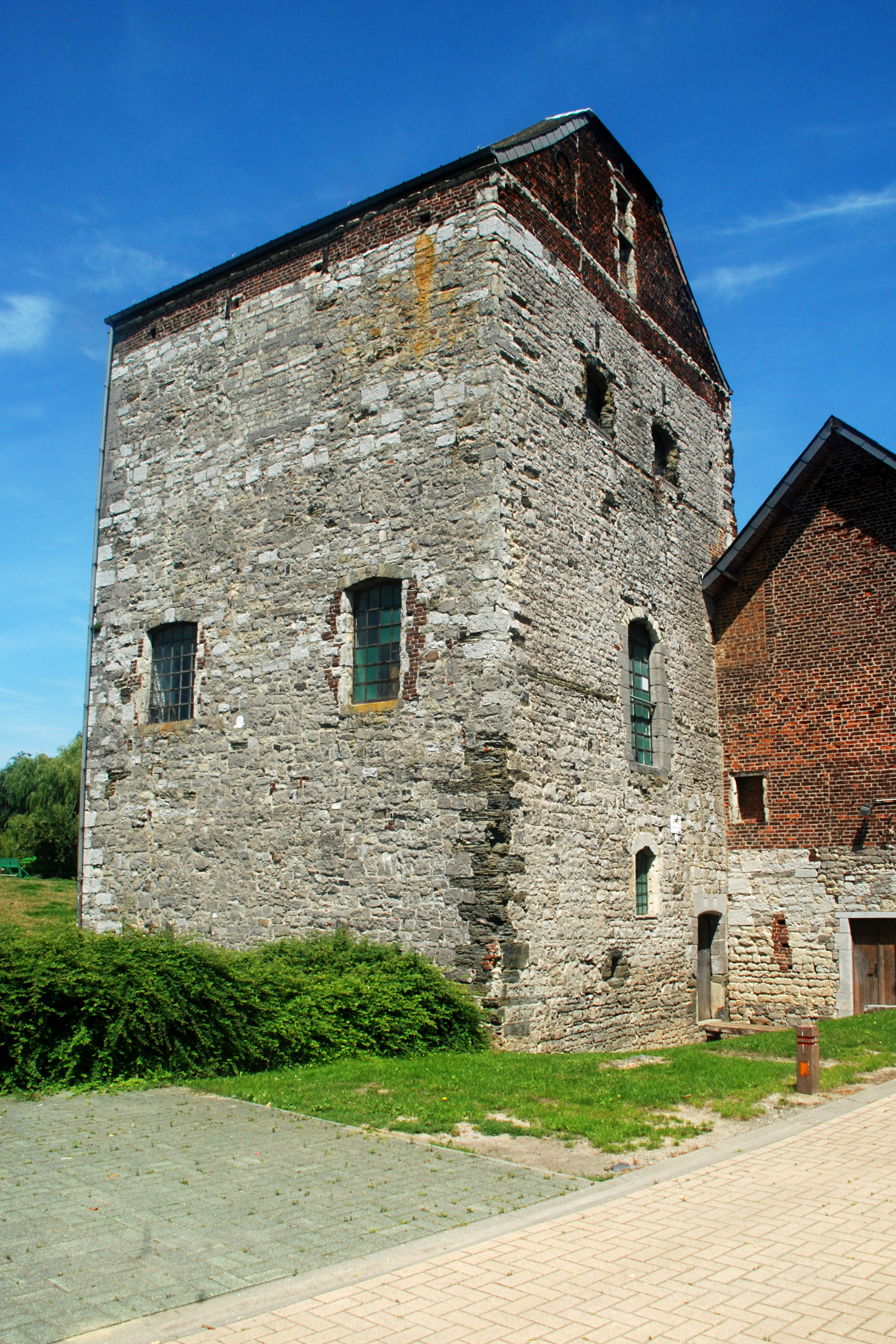
The dungeon of Mellet

Mellet (Walloon: Melet or Melet-dlé-Gochliye; in Old French Meflet) (pronounced [məlɛ] by the inhabitants) is a village of Wallonia and a district of the municipality of Les Bons Villers, located in the province of Hainaut, Belgium, situated north of Charleroi.

The meaning of the name Mellet is uncertain, but it may originate from the Old French meflet or meslet (the use of the long s explains the old spelling meflet). Other hypotheses suggest it comes from the Walloon mèsple (medlar tree), Old French melé (honey or yellowish), or Latin melum (apple). Today, the village is also nicknamed the "carrot village" (village des carottes) by surrounding communities due to its historically abundant carrot cultivation, a theme celebrated in local events.

== Geography ==
Mellet is crossed by a stream called Tintia, as well as the Villers stream, which is a tributary of the Tintia. The Tintia flows into the Piéton. It is part of the Meuse basin. The altitude of Mellet is 140 meters.

=== Demographics ===
The village has seen steady demographic growth, expanding from 1,021 inhabitants in 1831 to over 2,400 today. It has transformed into a residential area attracting both Dutch speakers and French-speaking commuters working in Brussels.

== History ==
The village was offered by the Merovingians to the chapter of Saint-Ursmer of Lobbes towards the end of the 7th century. By the 10th century, it fell under the control of the counts and later the Dukes of Brabant. A small enclave called Biemelet was ceded in 1209 to the Count of Namur. The fiefdoms passed through several noble families, including Glymes-Berghes in the 15th century and Ligne-Arenberg in the 16th century.

In 1742, Marie-Anne de Spanghen married Count Maximilien-Ferdinand de Clauwez-Briant, who acquired the fiefs. The local castle featured two moats and drawbridges, and a chapel containing a bell that was legendarily buried during the 1789 French Revolution to escape vandalism. Economically, the agricultural village once housed lime kilns, eight tile factories, and seven chicory factories.

=== Recent history ===
In 1977, five villages (Frasnes-lez-Gosselies, Mellet, Rèves, Villers-Perwin and Wayaux) came together to form the commune of Les Bons Villers. Mellet was a municipality in its own right before the merger of the municipalities.

== Heritage ==
- An old Roman road separates Mellet from the neighbouring village of Villers-Perwin. Its layout is still very visible. It originally connected Bavay to Tongeren.
- The Dungeon of Mellet, the only vestige of the old medieval 13th-century castle, is today a tourist center. We can find a local museum inside of it focusing on history, tile making, and local folklore. The castle was transferred to the municipal administration in 1862 and used as a school until 1868.
- The birthplace of Saint Mutien-Marie (Louis-Joseph Wiaux) (1841-1917), a brother of the Christian Schools, can be found behind the church.
- The Saints-Martin-et-Mutien-Marie Church, dating from the 8th and 9th centuries with Gothic elements. It was restored notably in 1666, the late 19th century, and 1992. It houses a 17th-century painting of "The Last Supper".
- The Colombier farm (also known as the Stouf farm) on Rue Burny, built in the mid-17th century.
- The Petit Chassart farm on Rue de Fleurus, dating from the first third of the 19th century.
- The village was the terminus of the former vicinal tramway line 60 from Charleroi, which was electrified in 1932. The passenger tram service ended in 1957, and the village's "Place du Terminus" is named after this old line.
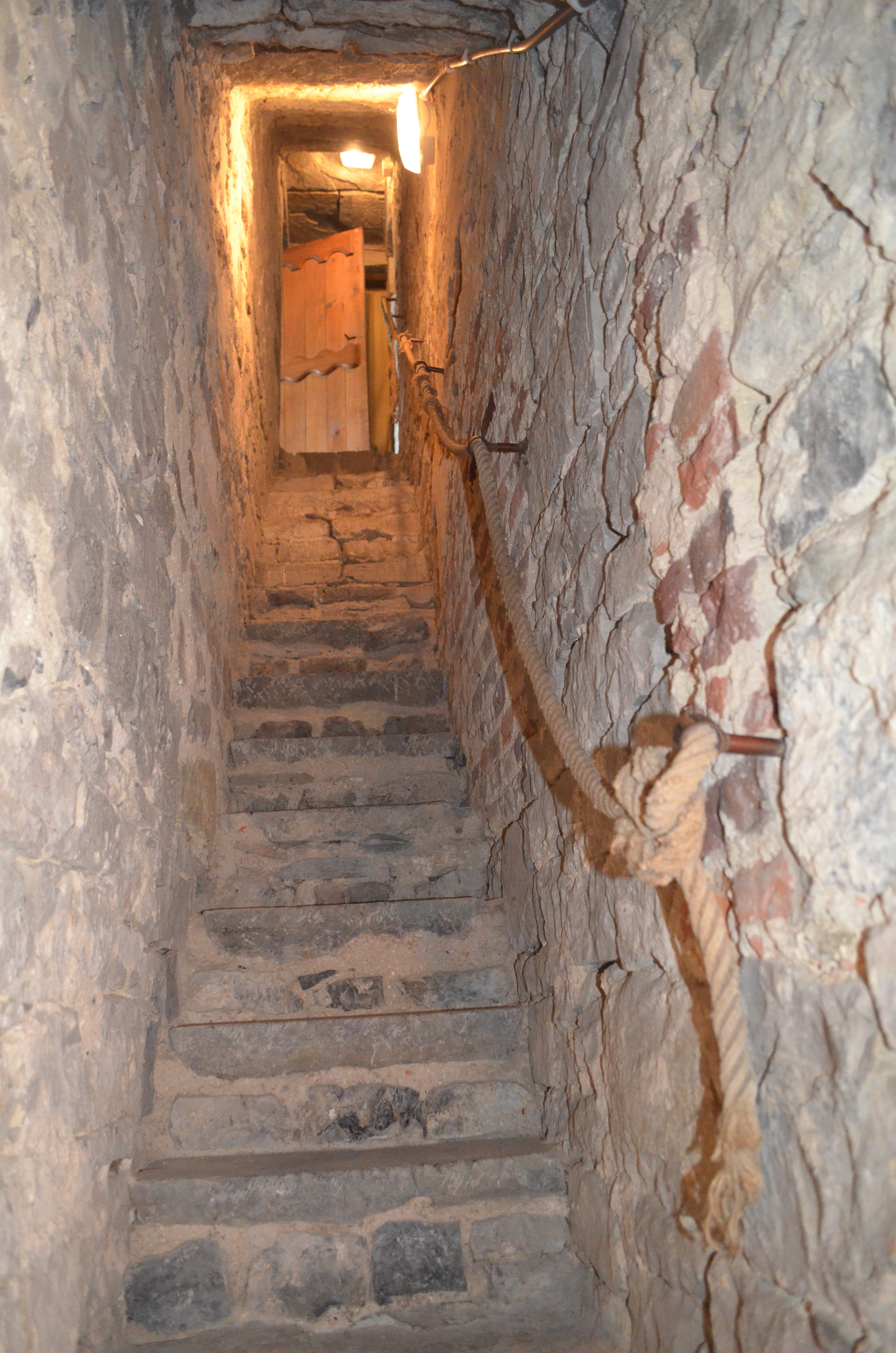
The intramural staircase of the dungeon

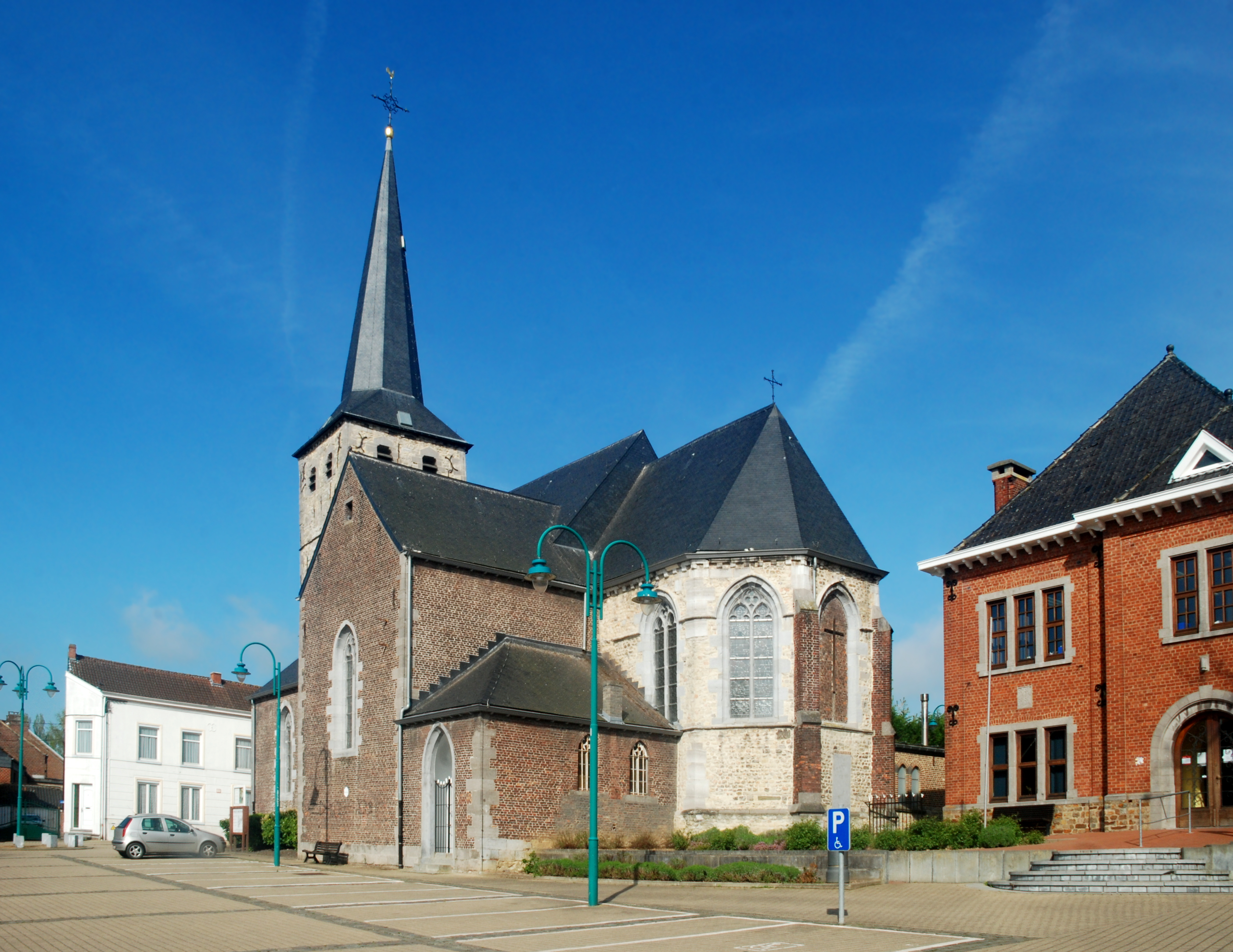
The Saints-Martin-et-Mutien-Marie Church

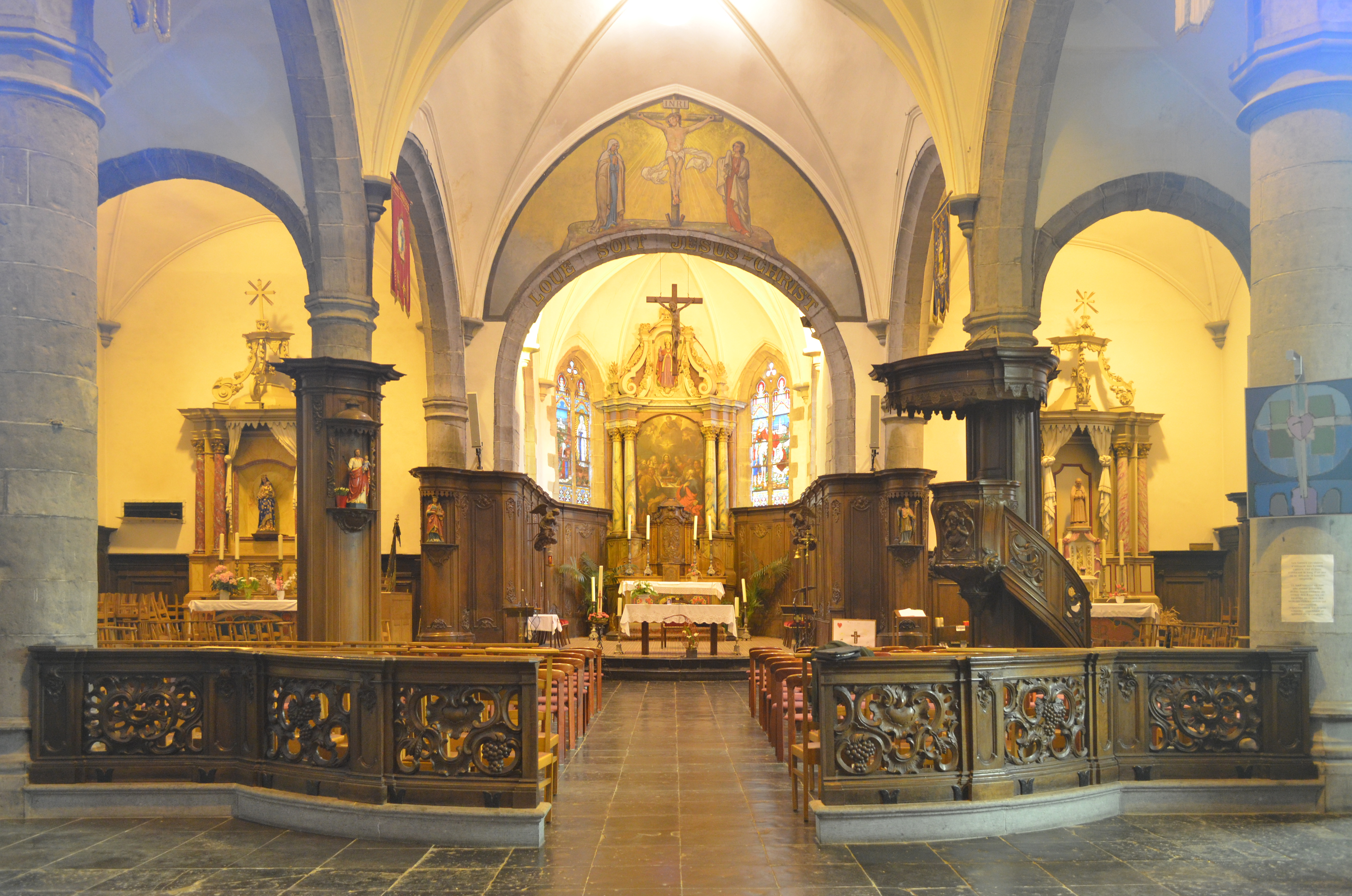
Nave of the church

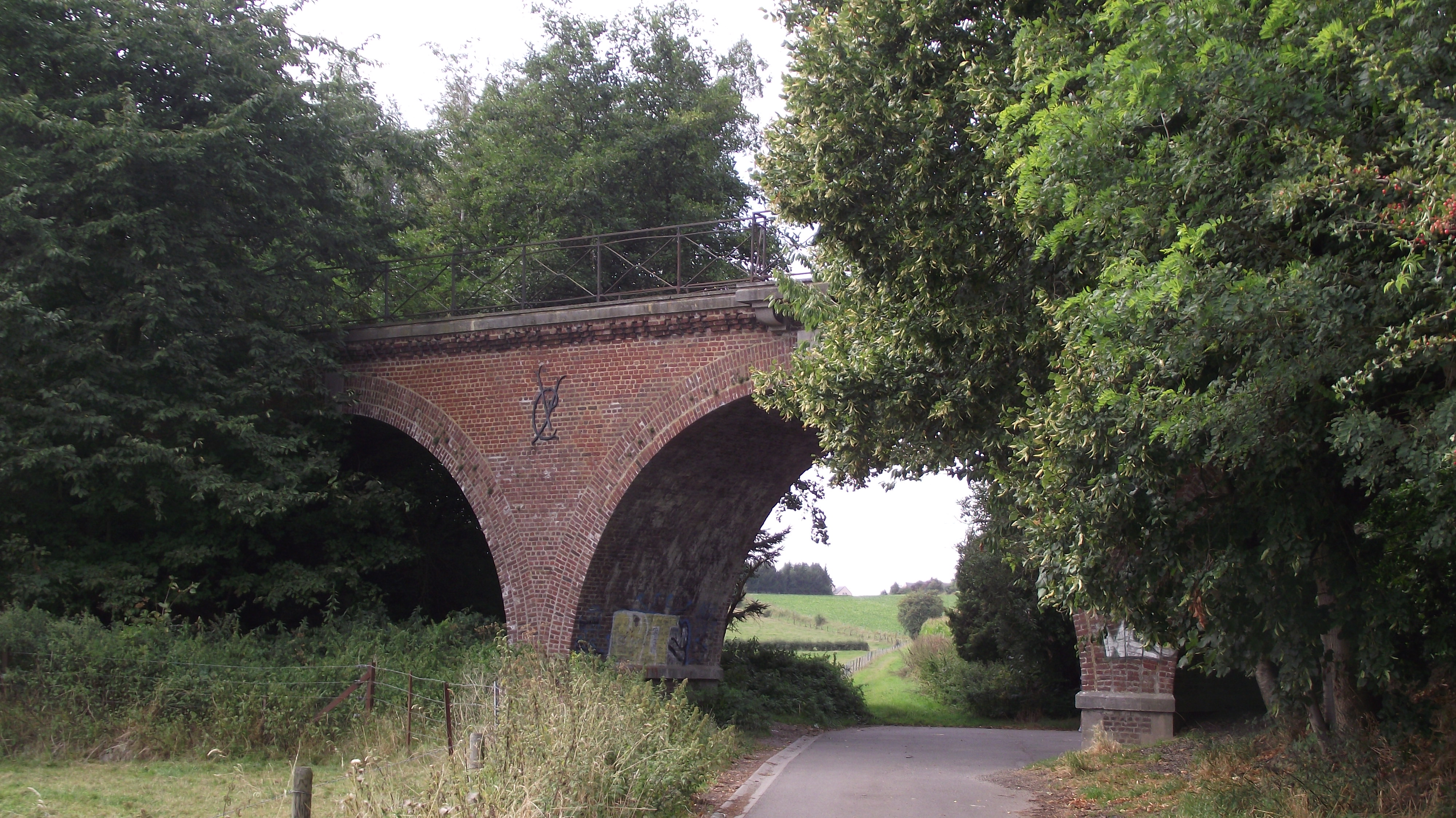
Bridge of the old vicinal railway line

== Activities ==
- A theatre group regularly gives performances in the local Walloon language, a mix of Charleroi and Nivelles dialects.
- A riding school called Le Relais du Maitreya offers riding lessons.
- The village has had its own music group, the Harmonie Royale de Mellet, since 1893.
- The village also has a Scout unit.
- Matches are frequently held on the Mellet Sport football pitch.
- The local municipal school, "Jacques Brel", is divided into a nursery section ("Les Mirabelles") and a primary section ("École du Vieux Château").
- A ducasse (local fair) takes place every year in September, featuring a running competition called the "Jogging des Carottes".
- Every year, around the end of April, the village hosts the traditional Grand Feu (Great Fire) of Mellet.

== Bibliography ==
- Le patrimoine monumental de la Belgique. Vol. 20: Wallonie, Hainaut, Arrondissement de Charleroi. Liège: Pierre Mardaga. 1994. p. 602. ISBN 978-2-8700-9588-1.
- Michaux, Lucien (2010). Le patrimoine de Mellet. Carnets du patrimoine. Vol. 68. Agence Wallonne du patrimoine. p. 64. ISBN 978-2-87522-003-5.
