= Octave Pirmez =

Belgian author

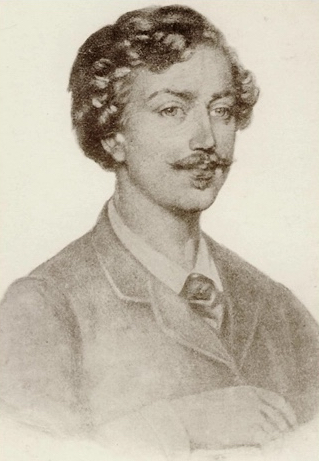
Octave Pirmez

Octave Pirmez (1832 – May 1883) was a Belgian writer born in Châtelineau.

== Life ==
Octave belonged to a well-known Belgian family. His cousin, Edouard Pirmez, was distinguished for his works on literary and political subjects. He lived an uneventful life at his family's château at Acoz, in Gerpinnes in Hainaut, where he died.

== Works ==
Pirmez was an ardent admirer of the French Romanticists. His works include:

- Les Feuillees: pensées et maximes (1862)
- Victor Hugo (1863)
- Jours de solitude (1869)
- Rémo: Souvenir d'un frère (1880); Édition posthume. 1900.
- Heures de philosophie (1881); Édition posthume. Perrin & Cie. 1900.
- (posthumous) Lettres à José (1884).

These books form a history of his emotional life, and reveal an extreme melancholy.
