= List of protected heritage sites in Gerpinnes =

This table shows an overview of the protected heritage sites in the Walloon town Gerpinnes. This list is part of Belgium's national heritage.

Object	Year/architect	Town/section	Address	Coordinates	Number^{?}	Image
Church of Saints-Michel-et-Rolende ^{(nl)} ^{(fr)}		Gerpinnes		50.337588°N 4.526513°E	52025-CLT-0001-01 Info	Kerk Saints-Michel-et-Rolende
Hêtre pourpre ^{(nl)} ^{(fr)}		Gerpinnes	rue de la Brasserie, n°8	50.372461°N 4.476025°E	52025-CLT-0002-01 Info	
Valley of the little stream Haies ^{(nl)} ^{(fr)}		Gerpinnes		50.369107°N 4.459240°E	52025-CLT-0003-01 Info	
Woodlands of the forest "Bois de Roumont" ^{(nl)} ^{(fr)}		Gerpinnes		50.367180°N 4.481287°E	52025-CLT-0004-01 Info	
The tower of the fortified cemetery around the church of Saints Michel et Rolende ^{(nl)} ^{(fr)}		Gerpinnes		50.337561°N 4.526943°E	52025-CLT-0005-01 Info	
Facades and roofs of all castle buildings at Villers-Poterie ^{(nl)} ^{(fr)}		Gerpinnes		50.350983°N 4.549277°E	52025-CLT-0006-01 Info	Gevels en daken alle gebouwen van kasteelhoeve te Villers-Poterie
Castle farm Villers-Poterie and its surroundings ^{(nl)} ^{(fr)}		Gerpinnes		50.350289°N 4.548383°E	52025-CLT-0007-01 Info	Kasteelhoeve Villers-Poterie en diens omgeving
Tomb Chapel of the family Pirmez (formerly church choir of Saint-Martin), old wall and environment ^{(nl)} ^{(fr)}		Gerpinnes	rue de l'église	50.350994°N 4.547044°E	52025-CLT-0009-01 Info	
Calvarie chapel and environment ^{(nl)} ^{(fr)}		Gerpinnes	rue de Presles, n°1 (en face)	50.350289°N 4.548383°E	52025-CLT-0010-01 Info	
Town hall: walls and roofs of old part and office of mayor, two towers at the entrance, gazebo, and environment ^{(nl)} ^{(fr)}		Gerpinnes		50.338089°N 4.528382°E	52025-CLT-0011-01 Info	sectionhuis: gevels en daken van oude deel en kabinet van burgemeester, twee torens bij het entree, tuinpaviljoen, en omgeving
Roman villa and surroundings ^{(nl)} ^{(fr)}		Gerpinnes	rue A. Thiebault n°11 (rechts)	50.334360°N 4.523438°E	52025-CLT-0013-01 Info	
Forest Bois du Houdrois ^{(nl)} ^{(fr)}		Gerpinnes		50.370236°N 4.488879°E	52025-CLT-0014-01 Info	
Woodlands of Bois de Joncret ^{(nl)} ^{(fr)}		Gerpinnes		50.367485°N 4.481020°E	52025-CLT-0015-01 Info	
Woodlands of Bois de la Bierlîre or Bertransart ^{(nl)} ^{(fr)}		Gerpinnes		50.361872°N 4.475181°E	52025-CLT-0016-01 Info	
Organs of the church of Saint-Martin ^{(nl)} ^{(fr)}		Gerpinnes		50.354888°N 4.531132°E	52025-CLT-0017-01 Info	

== See also ==
- List of protected heritage sites in Hainaut (province)
- Gerpinnes
