= Arthur Grumiaux =

Belgian violinist (1921–1986)

Background information
- Born: Arthur Grumiaux; 21 March 1921; Villers-Perwin, Belgium
- Died: 16 October 1986 (aged 65) Brussels, Belgium
- Occupation: Violinist

Baron Arthur Grumiaux (French: [gʁymjo]; 21 March 1921 – 16 October 1986) was a Belgian violinist, considered by some to have been "one of the few truly great violin virtuosi of the twentieth century". He has been noted for having a "consistently beautiful tone and flawless intonation". English music critic and broadcaster, Edward Greenfield wrote of him that he was "a master virtuoso who consistently refused to make a show of his technical prowess".

== Early life ==
Born to a working-class family in the Belgian town of Villers-Perwin, on 21 March 1921, Grumiaux was only three years old when his grandfather urged him to begin music studies. He entered the conservatoire in Charleroi at the age of six; the normal entry age was eleven. He studied violin and piano there until the age of eleven, when he graduated and moved to the Royal Conservatoire in Brussels to study violin.

== Career ==
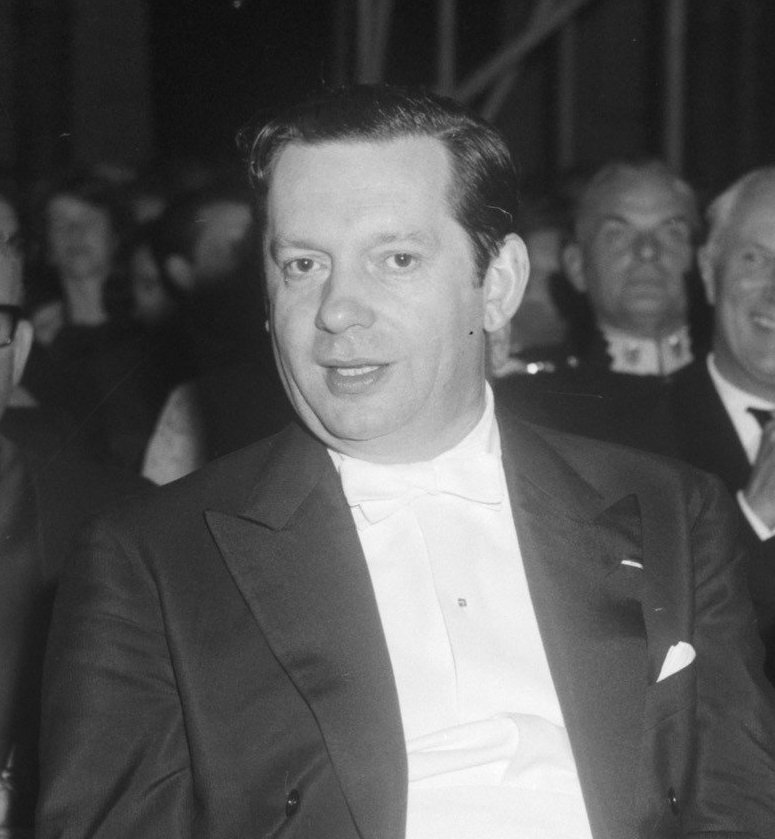
Arthur Grumiaux (1965)

He variously has been described as having made his debut in Brussels at the age of 14, or in 1935, although his debut is more commonly said to have occurred in 1940. This performance was made in Belgium with the Brussels Philharmonic playing Mendelssohn's Violin Concerto.

Due to the German invasion of his homeland, he next played publicly after liberation in 1945 with the Allied military entertainment organisation, making his London debut later that year. In 1949 he was appointed professor of violin at the Brussels Conservatoire where he had once studied. He debuted in the United States in Boston in 1951, and toured the United States in the following year.

In 1973 he was created a baron by King Baudouin of Belgium for his services to music.

== Death ==
He died of a sudden stroke in Brussels (Belgium) on 16 October 1986 at the age of 65.

== Recordings ==
Grumiaux had a long-standing relationship with Philips Records, lasting more than 20 years, and recordings are available from them of him performing works by Handel, Bach, Vivaldi, Michael Haydn, Mozart, Beethoven, Schubert, Mendelssohn, Bruch, Tchaikovsky, Saint-Saëns, Lalo, Henryk Wieniawski, and Johan Svendsen.

He was part of the Grumiaux Trio for many years, an ensemble consisting of Grumiaux, violist Georges Janzer and cellist Eva Czako. They recorded for Philips during the 1960s through to the mid-1970s, until Czako's death in 1978. Their discography includes chamber music by Beethoven, Schubert, Brahms, Dvořák, Martinů and Mozart. In 1967 they recorded a highly-acclaimed interpretation of Mozart's String Trio in E-flat major, K. 563 for Philips that is regarded by critics as one of the greatest chamber music recordings in history. In 1974 the Trio recorded Mozart's string quintets, with the addition of violinist Arpad Gerécz and violist Max Lesueur, for Philips, which were included in the 1991 Complete Mozart Edition.

A recording of Grumiaux's performance of one movement from Bach's Sonatas and Partitas for Solo Violin, the "Gavotte en rondeaux" from the Partita No. 3, is included on the Voyager Golden Record, attached to the Voyager spacecraft, as a sample of the culture of Earth. This recording was chosen by renowned scientist Carl Sagan.

His 1969 recording of Alban Berg's Violin Concerto with the Concertgebouw Orchestra under Igor Markevitch was nominated for the Grammy Award for Best Classical Performance – Instrumental Soloist or Soloists (with or without orchestra) at the 11th Ceremony.

== His violins ==
He owned a Guarneri, the "Rose", made by Giuseppe Guarneri in 1744, and played (but did not own) a Stradivarius, the "General Dupont", made in 1727. He also owned the "Museum", made by Giuseppe Guarneri in 1739, and the "Campoli", made by Giovanni Guadagnini in 1773.

== Violin Competition ==
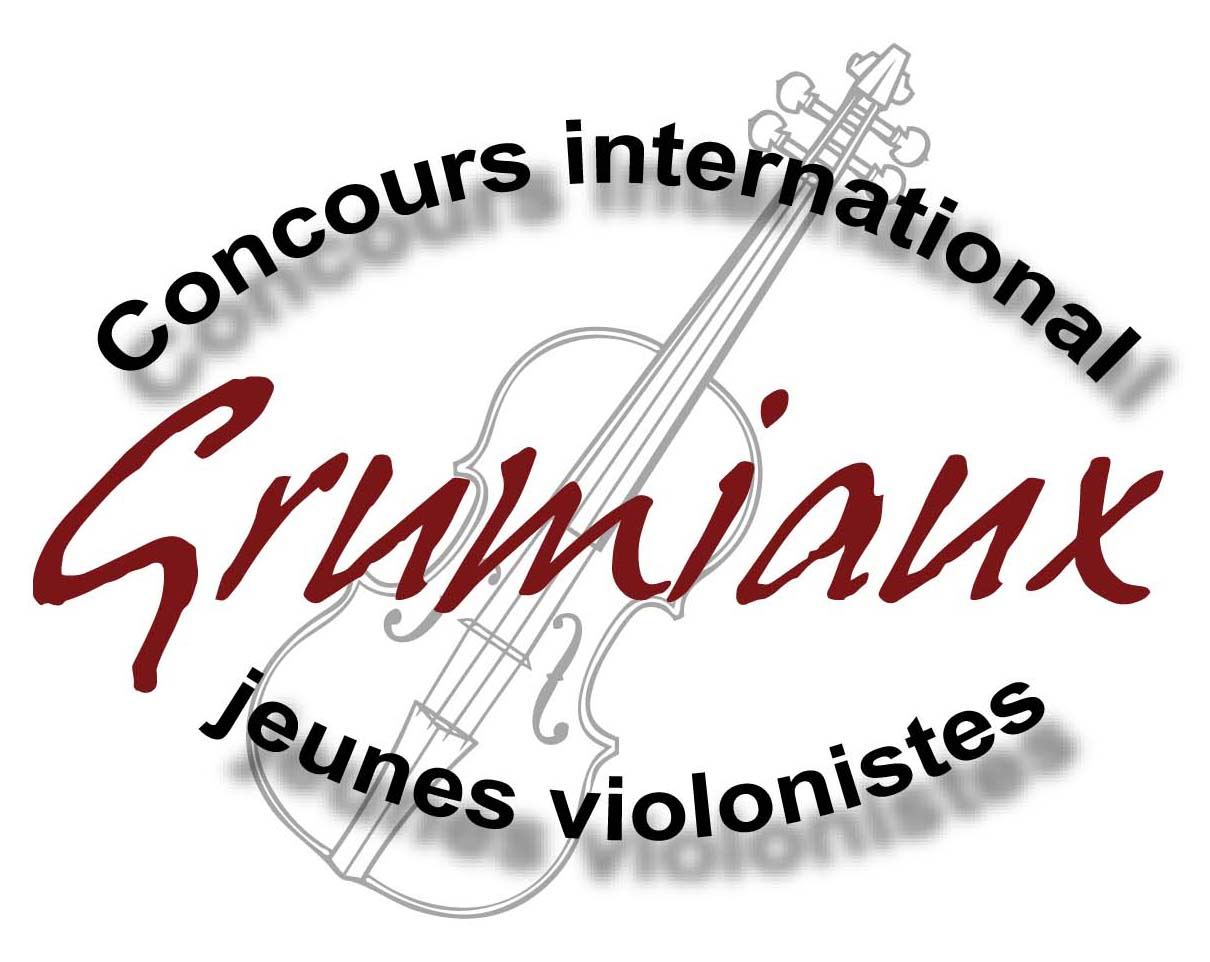
Logo of the competition

The Arthur Grumiaux International Violin Competition is held annually and takes place at the Royal Conservatory of Brussels in Belgium. It was first held in 2008 under the name of "Bravo", In 2015, the competition was renamed in honour of Arthur Grumiaux, and is now called Concours International Arthur Grumiaux pour Jeunes Violonistes (International Arthur Grumiaux Competition for Young Violinists).
