= List of protected heritage sites in Genappe =

This table shows an overview of the protected heritage sites in the Walloon town Genepiën, or Genappe. This list is part of Belgium's national heritage.

Object	Year/architect	Town/section	Address	Coordinates	Number^{?}	Image
The mountains of Thy ^{(nl)} ^{(fr)}		Genepien	Baisy-Thy en Ways	50.609127°N 4.464603°E	25031-CLT-0002-01 Info	
Organs of the church of Saint-Pierre ^{(nl)} ^{(fr)}		Genepien		50.629881°N 4.453529°E	25031-CLT-0004-01 Info	
Organs of the church of Saint-Jean Baptiste ^{(nl)} ^{(fr)}		Genepien		50.597447°N 4.442387°E	25031-CLT-0007-01 Info	
Chapel of Notre-Dame de Foy Loupoigne including the surrounding grounds ^{(nl)} ^{(fr)}		Genepien		50.601761°N 4.452271°E	25031-CLT-0008-01 Info	
Caillou farm, even the house located at the front of the Brussels road, and the enclosing wall and ensemble of the said farm, garden and outbuildings ^{(nl)} ^{(fr)}		Genepien		50.646046°N 4.420703°E	25031-CLT-0009-01 Info	Boerderij van Caillou, namelijk het huis gelegen aan de voorkant van de Brusselse weg, en de omsluitende muur en ensemble van de genoemde boerderij, tuin en bijgebouwen
Church of Saint Martin ^{(nl)} ^{(fr)}		Genepien		50.610044°N 4.462492°E	25031-CLT-0011-01 Info	Kerk Saint Martin
Facade and roof of house ^{(nl)} ^{(fr)}		Genepien	rue du centre n° 32	50.598338°N 4.442981°E	25031-CLT-0012-01 Info	Gevel en dak van huis
Farm: facades and roofs ^{(nl)} ^{(fr)}		Genepien	place Charles Morimont n° 1	50.597883°N 4.441758°E	25031-CLT-0014-01 Info	Boerderij: gevels en daken
Organs in the church of Saint-Hubert ^{(nl)} ^{(fr)}		Genepien		50.593804°N 4.465860°E	25031-CLT-0016-01 Info	Orgels kerk Saint-Hubert
Tower and two wings forming the body of the church of Saint Jean Baptiste ^{(nl)} ^{(fr)}		Genepien		50.597426°N 4.442294°E	25031-CLT-0017-01 Info	
Farm "Basse Cour" of the castle: facades and roofs ^{(nl)} ^{(fr)}		Genepien	rue du Centre n° 37	50.597323°N 4.441669°E	25031-CLT-0018-01 Info	
Ensemble of the old mill, church and the farms ^{(nl)} ^{(fr)}		Genepien		50.597074°N 4.438926°E	25031-CLT-0019-01 Info	
Monument "aux Belges" of 1815, the route Houtain ^{(nl)} ^{(fr)}		Genepien		50.573050°N 4.448246°E	25031-CLT-0020-01 Info	
Ensemble of the forest of Conins and the wooded parts of the ponds ^{(nl)} ^{(fr)}		Genepien		50.648745°N 4.511000°E	25031-CLT-0021-01 Info	
Facades, roofs and stained glass of the chapel of Chantelet ^{(nl)} ^{(fr)}		Genepien		50.649902°N 4.434034°E	25031-CLT-0023-01 Info	
Chapel of Try-au-Chêne and the shrines of Our Lady of Alsemberg and ensemble of these monuments and their surroundings ^{(nl)} ^{(fr)}		Genepien		50.608099°N 4.514121°E	25031-CLT-0024-01 Info	Kapel du Try-au-Chêne en de heiligdommen van Onze Lieve Vrouw van Alsemberg en ensemble van deze monumenten en hun omgeving
Façade and roof of the building, setting up a protection zone ^{(nl)} ^{(fr)}		Genepien	rue de Ways 39	50.610697°N 4.452388°E	25031-CLT-0025-01 Info	Voorgevel en het daken van het gebouw, oprichting beschermingsgebied
Farm of Caillou: establishment of a protection zone ^{(nl)} ^{(fr)}		Genepien		50.648495°N 4.423473°E	25031-CLT-0027-01 Info	

== See also ==
- Lists of protected heritage sites in Walloon Brabant
- Genappe
