= Acoz Castle =

Belgian castle

- Acoz, Wallonia, Belgium
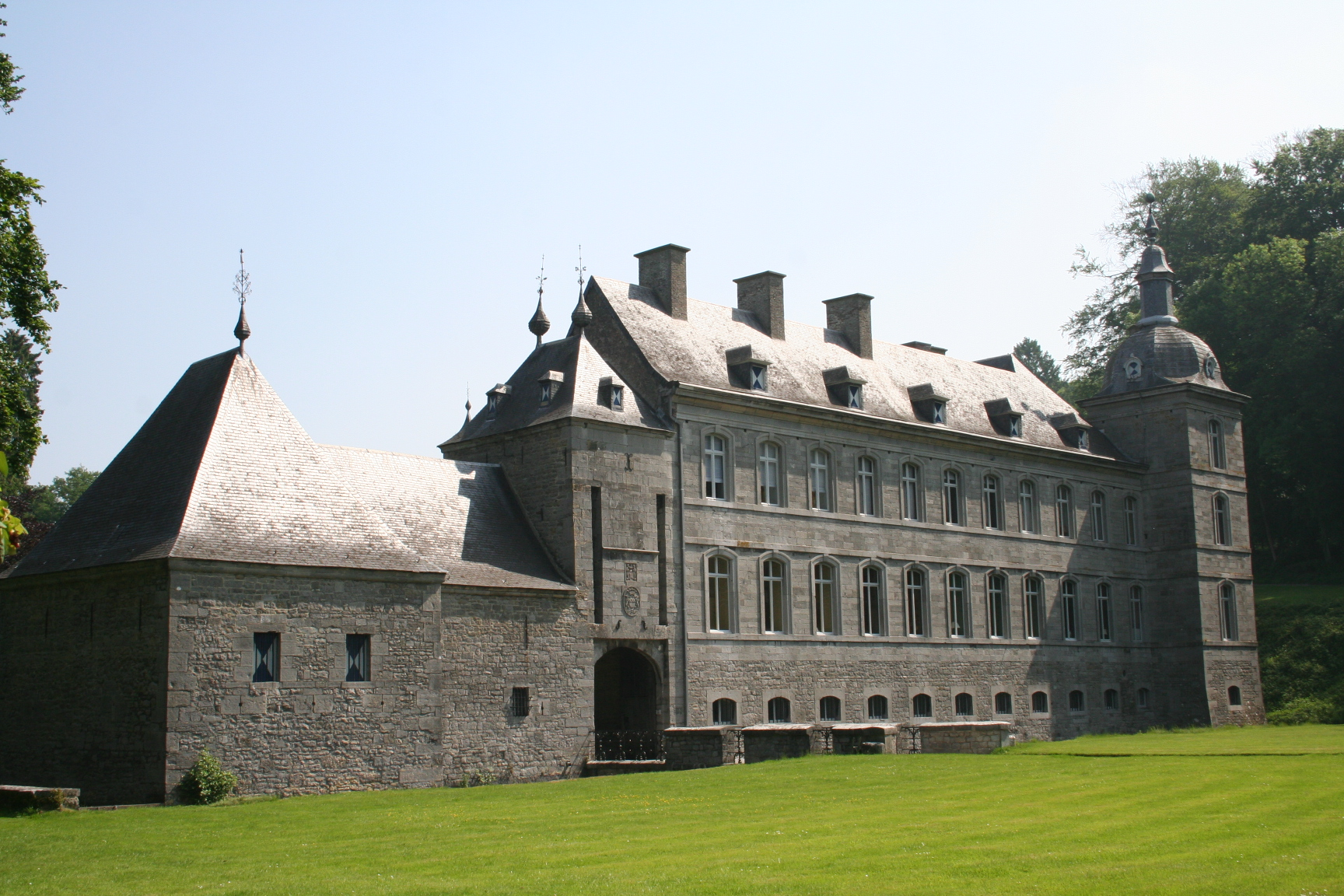

Site information
- Type: Castle

Location
- Coordinates: 50°21′22″N 4°32′05″E

Site history
- Built: 16th–17th centuries

Acoz Castle, also known as the Château Pirmez, is a château in Acoz in the municipality of Gerpinnes, Hainaut, Wallonia, Belgium.

== History ==
In 1760 the castle came through inheritance into possession of Michel-Joseph d'Udekem de Guertechin (1684-1761). It was owned by d'Udekem d'Acoz family until 1860, when the château was sold to the Pirmez family. During the 19th century it was the home of Belgian author Octave Pirmez.

== See also ==
- List of castles in Belgium
