= D'Udekem =

Family

d'Udekem
- noble family
- Coat of Arms of the comital branch since 1999
- Country: Belgium
- Current head: Bernard, Count d'Udekem d'Acoz
- Titles: Count, mostly jonkheer
- Estates: Losange Castle, Couthof Castle, Raepenburg Castle.
- Cadet branches: d'Udekem d'Acoz; d'Udekem Gentinnes; d'Udekem de Guertechin

The House d'Udekem (French: [dyd(ə)kɛm]) is an old noble family that has belonged to the nobility of Belgium since 1816.

== History ==
The origin of the d'Udekem family dates back to the Late Middle Ages, with the earliest member recorded Gooris van Udekem (†1472), who, in 1468, purchased the Lordship of Guertechin in Bossut. In the 18th century the Dominium of Acoz was obtained via marriage by the family. The first elevation of a member of the family to the French nobility took place in 1716, but this branch became extinct in the male line in 1803. The French Revolution meant the abolition of the family's noble status in 1795, but it was later restored under the rule of King William I of the Netherlands.

Until 2000, the head of the d'Udekem family held the rank of Baron. After the wedding of Mathilde d'Udekem d'Acoz with the Duke of Brabant at the time, King Albert II extended the hereditary title of Count to the three brothers Henri, Raoul and Patrick d'Udekem d'Acoz and to all their descendants.

Members of the family were active in politics.

== Descendants of Charles Joseph, Baron d'Udekem d'Acoz ==
Charles Joseph Marie Ghislain, Baron (1921) d'Udekem d'Acoz (1885-1968), Mayor of Proven

  - Henri Joseph Adelin François Xavier Marie, Count (2000) d'Udekem d'Acoz (1933-2021), Mayor of Poperinge, married to Jonkvrouw Marie-Madeleine Kervyn d'Oud Mooreghem (born 1940), without issue
  - Raoul Paul Adelin François Xavier Marie, Count (2000) d´Udekem d'Acoz (1935-2023), local politician, married in 1960 to Jonkvrouw Françoise de Maere d'Aertrycke (born 1935)
  1. Bernard Marguerite Jean Charles Marie Ghislain, Count (2000) d'Udekem d'Acoz (born 1965)
    married in 1998 to Jonkvrouw Marie-Pierre Verhaegen (born 1966), historian, and has three children
  - Patrick Paul François Xavier Marie Ghislain, Count (2000) d'Udekem d'Acoz (1936-2008), local politician, married in 1971 to Countess Anna Maria Komorowska (born 1946)
  1. Mathilde, Countess (2000) d'Udekem d'Acoz (born 1973), married in 1999 to King Philippe of Belgium (born 1960)
  2. Jonkvrouw Marie-Alix (1974-1997)
  3. Elisabeth, Countess (2000) d'Udekem d'Acoz (born 1977), married to Margrave Alfonso Pallavicini (born 1964)
  4. Hélène, Countess (2000) d'Udekem d'Acoz (born 1979), married to Baron Nicolas Janssen (born 1974)
  5. Charles-Henri, Count (2000) d'Udekem d'Acoz (born 1985), married in 2022 to Caroline Philippe

== Properties of d'Udekem d'Acoz family ==
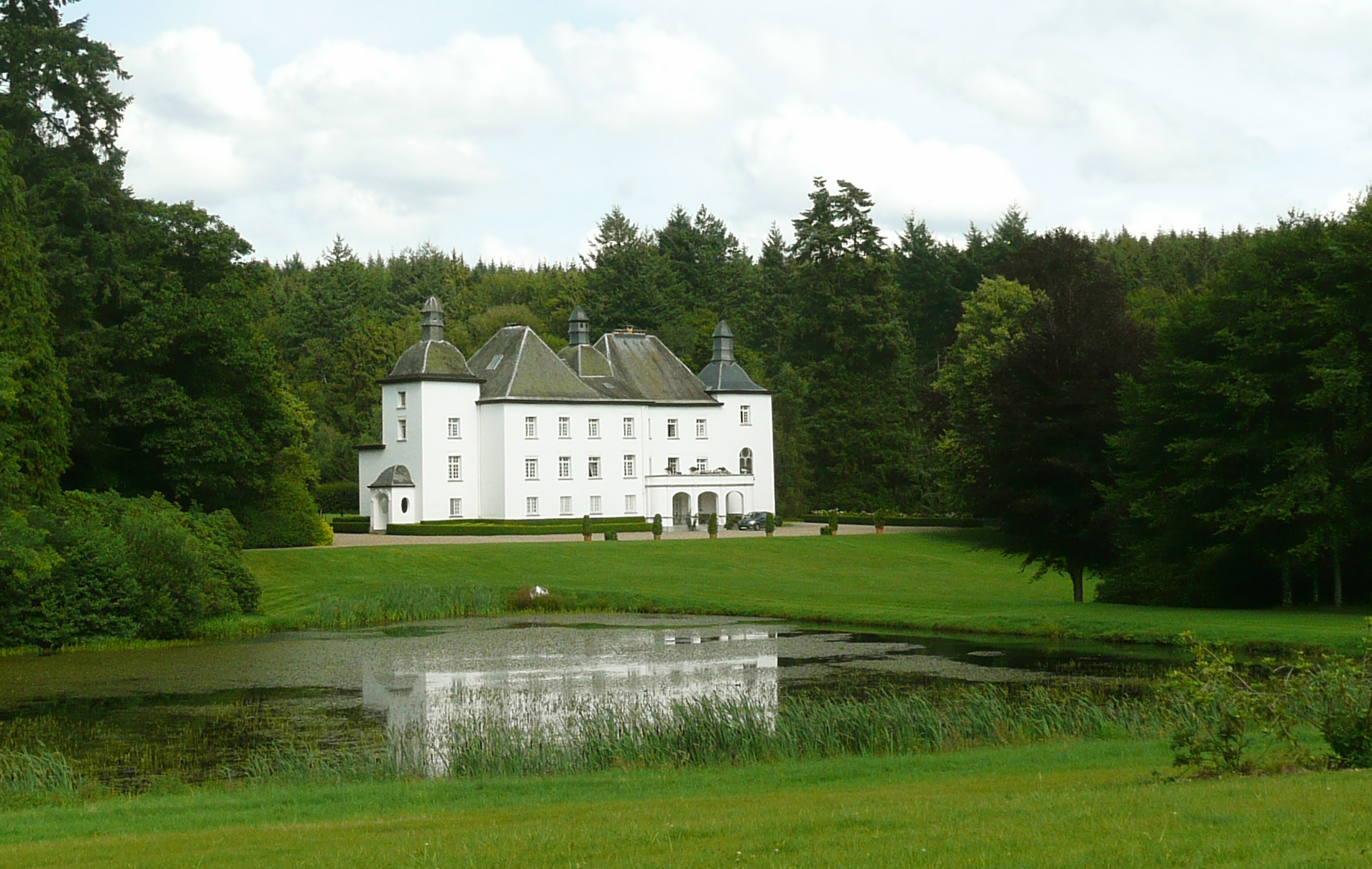
Losange Castle, private property of the dowager Countess Anna Maria d’Udekem d’Acoz

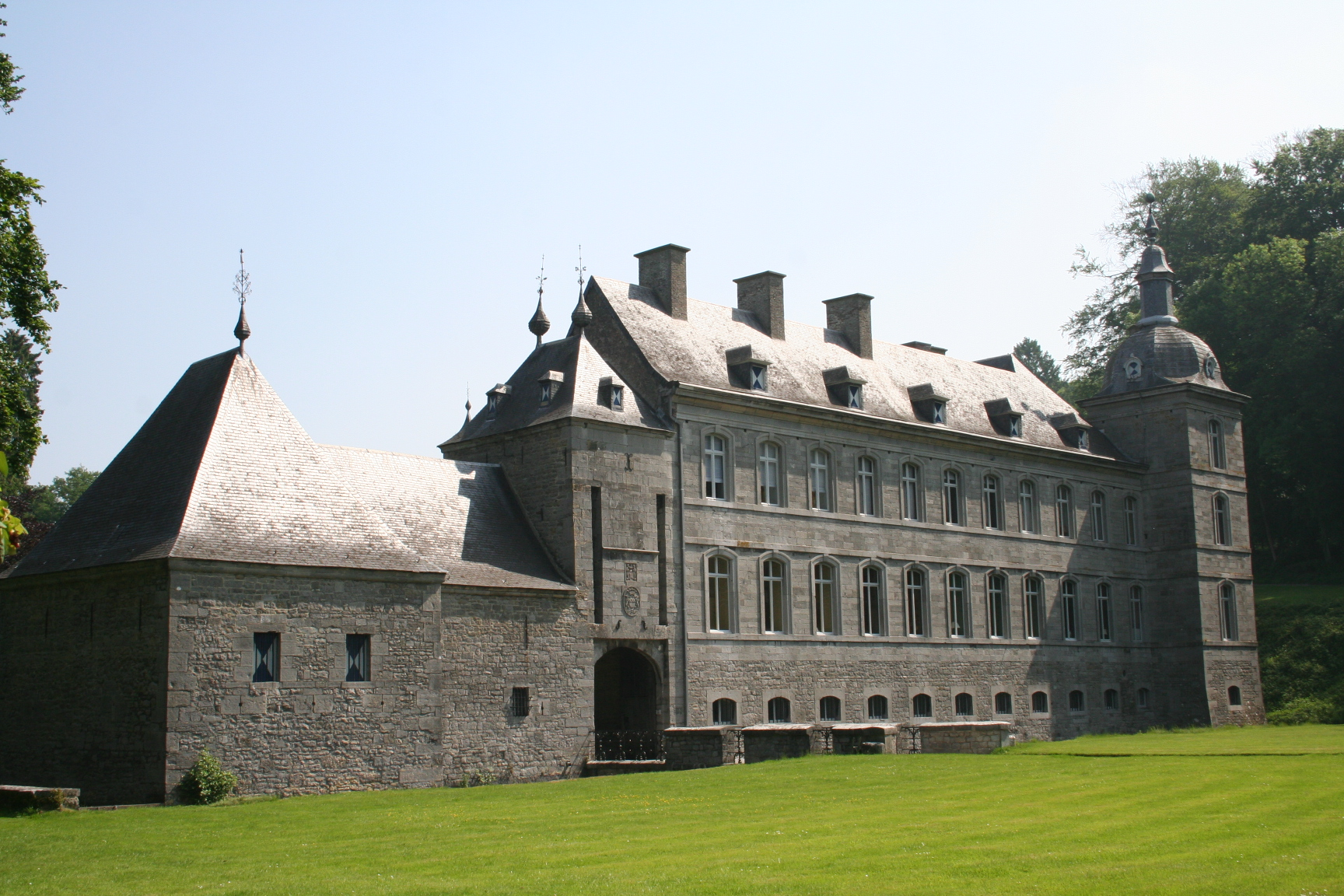
Acoz Castle, home of d'Udekem d'Acoz family from 1760 until 1860

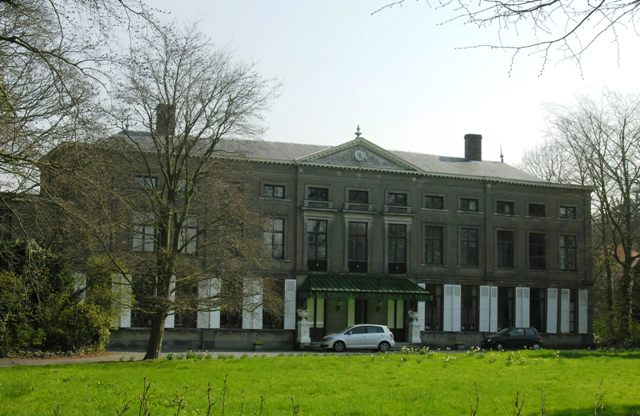
Couthof Castle, residence of d'Udekem family since 1945

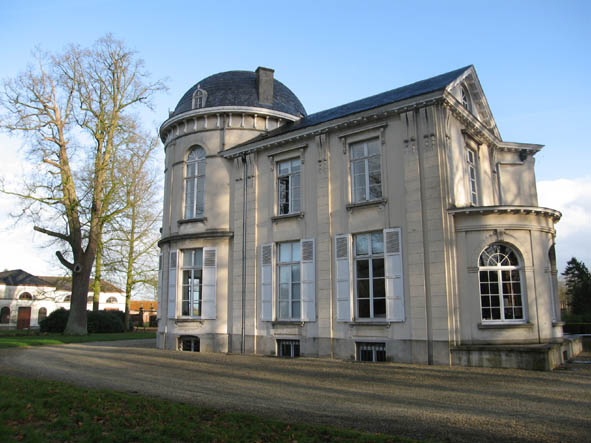
Raepenburg Castle, home of Count Bernard d'Udekem d'Acoz

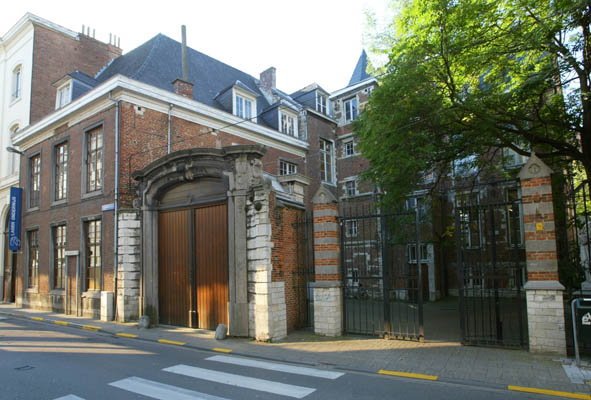
Entrance to the former Hôtel d'Udekem d'Acoz in Leuven, once city residence of the family
