= Edmond Dauchot =

Belgian photographer, poet and engraver

- Born: Edmond Dauchot; 1905; Gosselies
- Died: 1978 (aged 72–73)

Edmond Dauchot (1905–1978) was a Belgian photographer, poet and engraver. He was born in Gosselies in the industrial municipality of Charleroi where he worked in the family brickmaking business but gave it up in 1930 to move to the hamlet of Olloron near the village of Nadrin (municipality of Houffalize) in the Belgian Ardenne, which inspired his work for the rest of his life.

== Bibliography ==
- Edmond Dauchot, Ardenne bien aimée, with a preface by André Dhôtel, Paris-Gembloux, J. Duculot, 1976
- René Hénoumont, Edmond Dauchot : le photographe de l'Ardenne d'autrefois, with an introduction by Georges Vercheval, with a testimony by René Hénoumont and an afterword by André Dhôtel, Tournai, La Renaissance du livre, 2000, ISBN 2804604233
- Jean-Pierre Orban, Edmond Dauchot: Ardenne buissonnière: Journal et photos 1937–1971, Paris-Gembloux, Duculot, 1984, ISBN 2801105228
- Octave Servais, Ardenne: 35 photographies d'Edmond Dauchot, Bruxelles-Liège, PIM services, 1958
