= Brussels South Charleroi Airport =

International airport serving Charleroi, Wallonia, Belgium

Brussels South Charleroi Airport Luchthaven Charleroi Brussel-Zuid Aéroport de Charleroi Bruxelles-Sud Flughafen Charleroi Brüssel-Süd

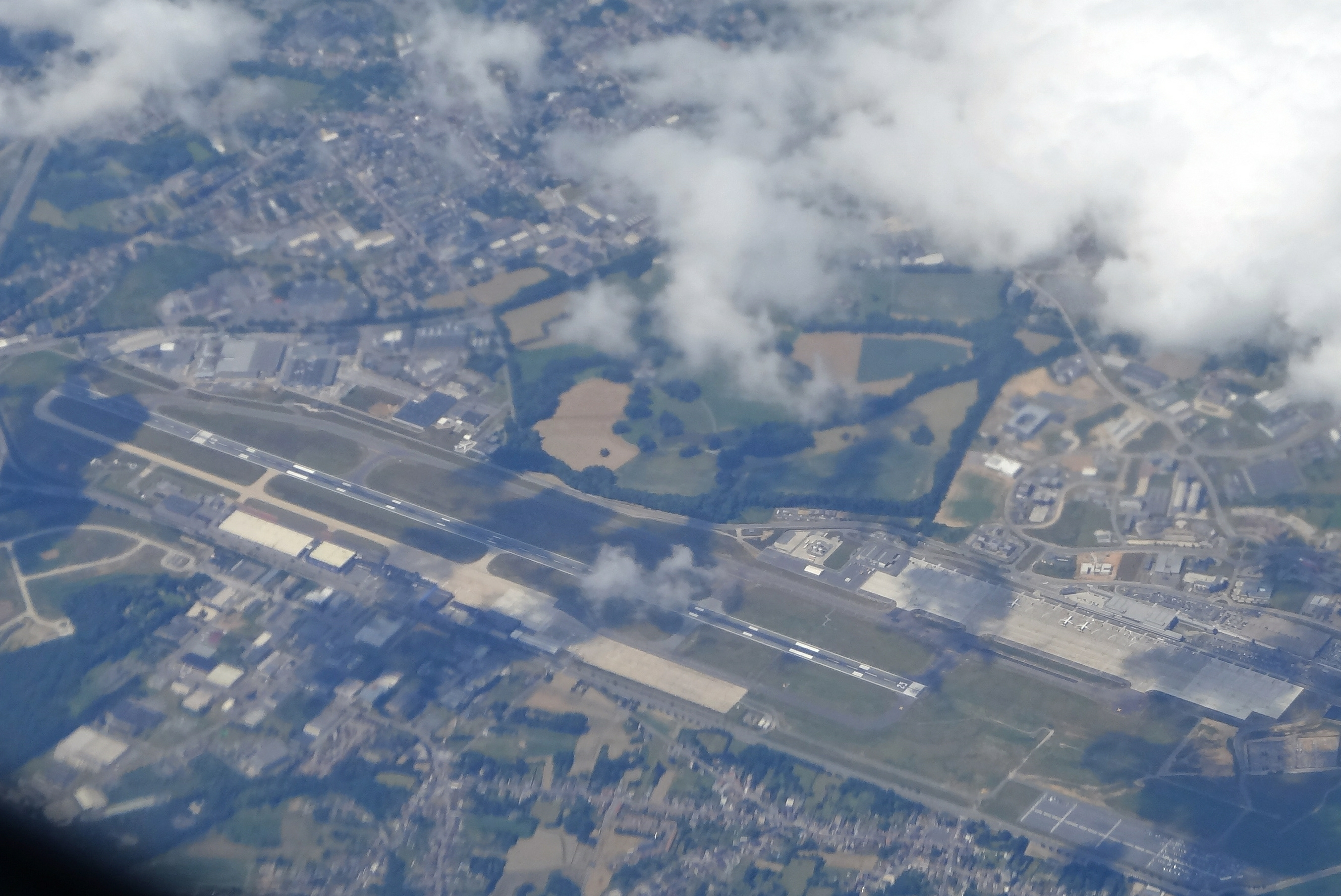
- IATA: CRL; ICAO: EBCI

Summary
- Airport type: Public
- Owner: Government of Wallonia
- Operator: Société Wallonne des Aéroports
- Serves: Brussels and Charleroi
- Location: Charleroi, Wallonia, Belgium
- Focus city for: Wizz Air
- Operating base for: Ryanair
- Elevation AMSL: 606 ft (185 m)
- Coordinates: 50°27′36″N 004°27′10″E
- Website: brussels-charleroi-airport.com

Map
- Brussels South Charleroi Airport in Belgium

Runways
Direction	Length		Surface
Direction	m	ft	Surface
06/24	3,200	10,499	Asphalt

Statistics (2024)
- Passengers: 10,504,554
- Change 23-24: ▲11.7%
- Sources: Elevation, coordinates and runways per AIM Belgium

Brussels South Charleroi Airport (Note: Dutch: Luchthaven Charleroi Brussel-Zuid; French: Aéroport de Charleroi Bruxelles-Sud; German: Flughafen Charleroi Brüssel-Süd) (BSCA), informally called Brussels-Charleroi Airport, (Note: Dutch: Luchthaven Brussel-Charleroi; French: Aéroport de Bruxelles-Charleroi; German: Flughafen Brüssel-Charleroi) Charleroi Brussels-South or Charleroi Airport (Note: Dutch: Luchthaven Charleroi; French: Aéroport de Charleroi; German: Flughafen Charleroi) (IATA: CRL, ICAO: EBCI), is an international airport located in Gosselies, part of the city of Charleroi, Wallonia, Belgium. The airport is 7 km (5 miles) north of downtown Charleroi and 46 km (29 miles) south of the city of Brussels.

Brussels-Charleroi is the second busiest airport in Belgium in terms of passengers and aircraft movements, having served 10,504,554 passengers in 2024 (91.673 movements). It is also a busy general aviation airfield, being home to three flight schools. The Aéropole, one of the Science Parks of Wallonia, is also located near the airport.

== History ==
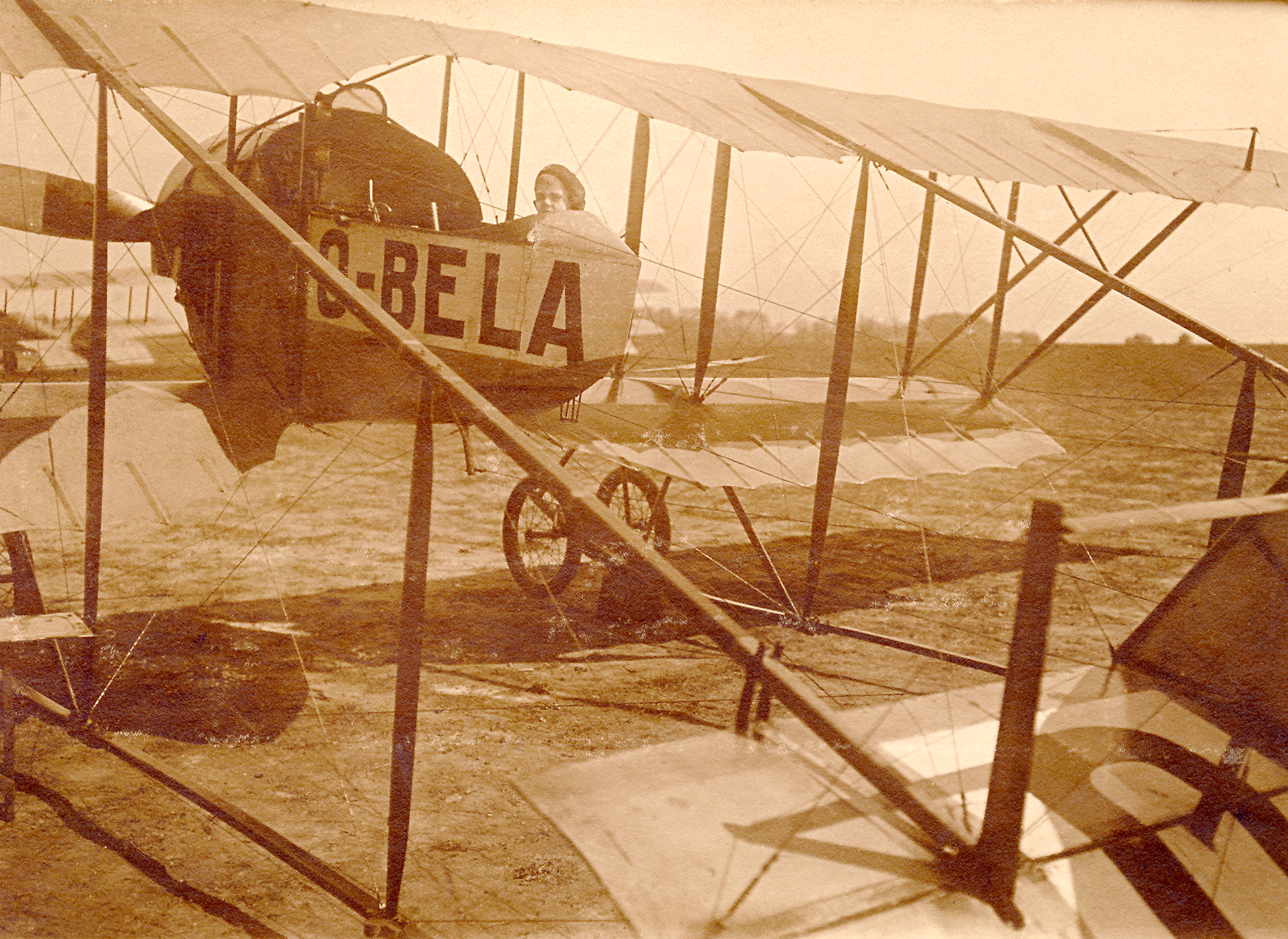
Biplane on the Gosselies airfield in 1920

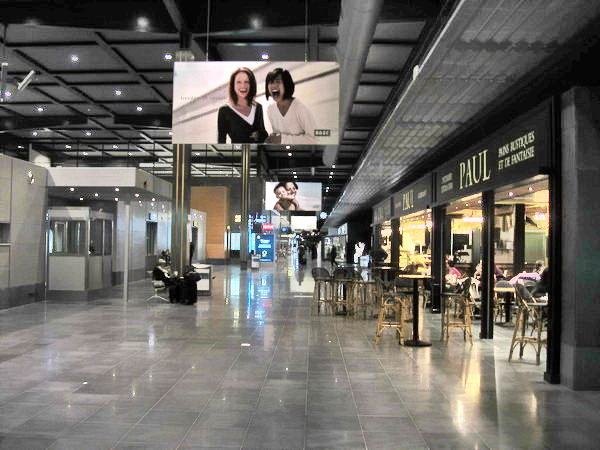
Terminal interior

=== Early years ===
The first aeronautical activities in Gosselies date back to 1919: a flight school was opened on Mont des Bergers—the highest point in the region—then, the following year, the Société Générale d'Aéronautique (SEGA) began aeronautical maintenance activities. The British aircraft manufacturer Fairey Aviation settled a subsidiary Avions Fairey on the site in 1931, making Gosselies a centre of the Belgian aeronautical industry.

During World War II, the site was arranged as an Advanced Landing Ground (A-87) for the allied air forces, from 14 September 1944 until 10 August 1945. After the war, the Gosselies Airfield became a public aerodrome operated by the Belgian State through its agency Régie des Voies Aériennes (RVA)/Regie der Luchtwegen (RLW), but the main activities of the site remained aeronautical constructions (installation of the Société Anonyme Belge de Constructions Aéronautiques (SABCA) in 1954, then the Société Nationale de Construction Aéronautique (SONACA) in 1978, taking over the activities of Fairey).

In the 1970s, the Belgian national airline Sabena launched a Liège–Charleroi–London service, but this was soon dropped because of poor results. Gosselies was left with almost no passenger traffic, the airport being mainly used for private or pleasure flights, training flights and occasional charters to leisure destinations around the Mediterranean Sea or to Algeria.

=== Development since the 1990s ===
On 9 July 1991, the limited company Brussels South Charleroi Airport (BSCA) was created. This operation was part of the effective transfer from the State to the Regions of the powers to manage and operate regional airports, which took place on 1 January 1992. During 1992 and 1993, a series of management procedures were put in place, which began to take effect in 1995 and even more so in 1996.

Operations at Brussels South Charleroi grew in the 1990s, with this new commercial management structure and the arrival of Irish low-cost airline Ryanair in 1997, which opened its first continental base at Charleroi a few years later. Although criticised for the subsidies paid by the Walloon government to help its installation, Ryanair opened new routes from Brussels South Charleroi (they also closed two destinations: London–Stansted and Liverpool, although Stansted was re-introduced in June 2007 before being suspended again). Other low-cost carriers later joined Ryanair in Brussels South Charleroi, such as Wizz Air. The Polish airline Air Polonia operated services from here to Warsaw and Katowice before going bankrupt in August 2004.

In September 2006, it was announced that Moroccan low-cost airline Jet4you would launch three weekly flights to Casablanca (on Wednesday, Thursday and Sunday) starting 1 November 2006, in code-share cooperation with Belgian airline Jetairfly. A new terminal opened in January 2008. It has a capacity of up to 5 million passengers a year, which means that it has reached its maximum capacity in 2010 (5,195,372 passengers).

The European Commission objected to assistance the airport offered to Ryanair, since the airport is owned by the Wallonia regional government and thus the discounts and other benefits could be considered state aid. However, the Court of First Instance (a European Union court) decided on 17 December 2008 that the commission's decision finding that illegal aid had been granted to Ryanair should be annulled and quashed as being erroneous in law. However, in March 2012, the commission reopened the case in order to take this judgment into account.

In January 2017, a second terminal (Terminal 2) was opened in order to relieve the T1 during rush hours and to be able to accommodate 10 million passengers a year in the future. In May 2019, work began on an extension of Charleroi Airport's runway, bringing it to a total length of 3,200 metres. Runway 06/24 is undergoing a 650-meter extension on the 24 end of the runway. On 8 October 2021, the runway extension was inaugurated in the presence of the Walloon Minister in charge of Airports Jean-Luc Crucke

The SABCA facility on site conducts depot-level maintenance, repair and overhaul work on United States Air Force F-16s based in Europe.

The airport plans to completely close for two months in 2028 to allow for runway refurbishment.

== Airlines and destinations ==
The following airlines operate regular scheduled and charter flights at Brussels South Charleroi Airport:

Airlines	Destinations
Air Arabia	Seasonal: Oujda
Air Corsica	Seasonal: Ajaccio, Bastia, Calvi, Figari
Pegasus Airlines	Antalya, Istanbul–Sabiha Gökçen
Ryanair	Agadir, Alghero, Alicante, Amman–Queen Alia, Ancona, Athens, Barcelona, Bari, Bergamo, Béziers, Biarritz, Bologna, Bratislava, Brindisi, Bucharest–Otopeni, Budapest, Cagliari, Carcassonne, Dublin, Dubrovnik, Edinburgh, Essaouira, Faro, Fès, Fuerteventura, Funchal, Girona, Gran Canaria, Helsinki, Katowice, Kraków, Lanzarote, Lisbon, Lourdes, Madrid, Málaga, Malta, Manchester, Marrakesh, Marseille, Nador, Naples, Newcastle upon Tyne, Nîmes, Oujda, Palermo, Palma de Mallorca, Paphos, Perpignan, Pescara, Pisa, Porto, Poznań, Prague, Rabat, Reggio Calabria, Riga, Rome–Ciampino, Rome–Fiumicino, Salerno, Santander, Seville, Sofia, Stockholm–Arlanda, Tangier, Tenerife–South, Tétouan, Thessaloniki, Tirana, Toulouse, Trieste, Turin, Valencia, Venice-Treviso, Verona, Vienna, Vitoria, Warsaw–Chopin, Warsaw–Modlin, Wrocław, Zagreb, Zaragoza; Seasonal: Almería, Banja Luka, Castellón, Chania, Corfu, Cork, Figari, Genoa, Heraklion, Ibiza, Kaunas, Lamezia Terme, La Rochelle, Menorca, Olbia, Perugia, Podgorica, Pula, Reus, Rhodes, Rodez, Santiago de Compostela, Sarajevo, Trapani, Volos, Zadar
Volotea	Seasonal: Bordeaux, Nantes, Nice
Wizz Air	Bucharest–Băneasa, Bucharest–Otopeni, Budapest, Chișinău, Cluj-Napoca, Craiova, Iași, Kutaisi, Pristina, Skopje, Sofia, Suceava, Târgu Mureș, Timișoara, Tirana, Varna, Warsaw–Chopin Yerevan (begins 1 February 2027)

== Statistics ==
Passengers per year
Year	Passengers	Evolution
2001	773,431	–
2002	1,271,979	▲64.45%
2003	1,803,587	▲41.19%
2004	2,034,797	▲12.81%
2005	1,873,349	▼8.61%
2006	2,166,360	▲15.64%
2007	2,458,255	▲13.47%
2008	2,957,026	▲20.28%
2009	3,937,187	▲33.14%
2010	5,195,372	▲31.96%
2011	5,901,007	▲15.18%
2012	6,516,427	▲10.43%
2013	6,786,979	▲4.15%
2014	6,439,957	▼5.11%
2015	6,956,302	▲8.01%
2016	7,303,720	▲4.99%
2017	7,698,767	▲5.41%
2018	7,454,671	▼3.17%
2019	8,224,196	▲10.32%
2020	2,558,046	▼68.89%
2021	3,758,289	▲46.92%
2022	8,271,138	▲120.08%
2023	9,396,251	▲13.60%
2024	10,504,554	▲11.79%

Busiest routes from Charleroi Airport
Rank	Airport	Passengers (2024)
1	Bucharest Airport (Romania)	343,858
2	Tirana Airport (Albania)	319,433
3	Bergamo Airport (Italy)	311,152
4	Budapest Airport (Hungary)	301,684
5	Manchester Airport (United Kingdom)	271,714
Source: Eurostat

== Ground transportation ==
=== Bus ===
There are several shuttles to different cities in the neighbouring countries including Luxembourg, and French cities such as Lille, plus a regular coach service that runs from the airport to Brussels-Central railway station. Also, a special bus (Airport Express – A) operates from the airport to Charleroi-Central railway station. A combined bus and train ticket to any other Belgian railway station can be bought in the terminal. A continuous shuttle bus service links Brussels (Brussels-Midi station) with Charleroi Airport. The buses run every approximately 30 minutes throughout the day, with schedules adapted to flight times. Fares start at €14.99 per person, and tickets can be purchased online on the Flibco website.

Charleroi Airport is connected to the regional rail network via Charleroi-South railway station. Passengers can take a local TEC bus service (Line A) between the airport and the station, with departures every 30 minutes and a journey time of around 20 minutes. From Charleroi-South station, regular SNCB/NMBS trains provide connections to major Belgian cities including Brussels, Namur, Liège and Mons. Tickets for the combined train and bus journey can be purchased at Belgian Rail stations or online via the SNCB/NMBS website.

=== Car ===
The airport is accessible by the A54/E420 highway.

== Accidents and incidents ==
- On 4 April 1978, a Boeing 737 OO-SDH operated on a training flight with an instructor and two co-pilot students. Both students were going to practice ILS approaches to runway 25 at Charleroi-Gosselies Airport (CRL) followed by a touch-and-go. The initial six approaches were uneventful. The students then changed seats. The second student's first approach and touch-and-go were uneventful. During the second touch-and-go a flock of birds (ring doves) were observed crossing the runway. Several birds were ingested as the airplane was rotating. The instructor took over control and attempted to continue takeoff. The airplane failed to respond to his control inputs and seemed to decelerate. He then decided to abort the takeoff. There was insufficient runway length available so the Boeing overran, struck localiser antennas and skidded. The right main gear collapsed and the no. 2 engine was torn off in the slide. The aircraft came to rest 300 m (980 ft) past the runway end and was destroyed by fire.
- On 8 April 2011, a Dutch F-16 made an emergency landing because of a failure of one of its sets of landing gear. The plane landed on its belly. The pilot did not suffer any injuries.
- On 9 February 2013, a small Cessna plane crashed near the runway after suffering technical problems during take-off; all 5 people on board died. The airport was closed for about six hours before resuming services.

== See also ==
- Brussels Airport
- Transportation in Belgium
