= Ducasse =

== Surname ==
Ducasse may refer to:

- Andrés Ducasse (born 1992)
- Alain Ducasse (born 1956), French chef
- Alice Ducasse (1841–1923), 19th century opera singer and teacher
- César Ducasse (born 1979)
- Charles Ducasse (1932–1983)
- Château Larcis Ducasse
- Curt John Ducasse (1881–1969), French philosopher concerned with aesthetics and philosophy of mind
- Francisco Ducasse (born 1996)
- Gervais Emmanuel Ducasse (1903–1988)
- Isidore Lucien Ducasse, who published books under the name Comte de Lautréamont
- Jean-Baptiste du Casse (1646–1715), French colonial governor of Saint-Domingue, slave trader, and admiral under Louis XIV
- Jean-Pierre Ducasse (1944–1969)
- Micaela Martinez DuCasse (1913–1989) American artist, author, and educator, known for her murals and sculptures.
- Pierre Ducasse (politician) (born 1972), Canadian politician and New Democratic Party (NDP) activist
- Vladimir Ducasse (born 1987), Haitian-born American football player

== Other uses ==
- Ducasse d'Ath
- Ducasse de Mons
- Ducasse Wine Merchants
