= Marie-Pierre Verhaegen =

Belgian historian

Jonkvrouw Marie-Pierre Brigitte Olivier Corneille Verhaegen, Countess d'Udekem d'Acoz (born 20 April 1966) is a Belgian noblewoman and a historian.

== Family ==
Verhaegen is of noble birth and daughter of Baron Pierre Corneille Theodore Verhaegen (b. 1923), mayor of Merelbeke and his wife Michelle Charlotte d'Hoop de Synghem. She is a direct descendant of Pierre-Théodore Verhaegen. She married in 1998 to Count Bernard d'Udekem d'Acoz, a first cousin of Queen Mathilde of Belgium. They have three children. She is a member of the Royal Commission of Mesen, member of the board of directors of the Association de la Noblesse du Royaume de Belgique.

She completed her studies in History at Ghent University.

== Works ==
- Marie-Pierre d'Udekem d'Acoz, "Pour le Roi et la Patrie. La noblesse belge dans la Résistance" (Bruxelles, 2003)
- Marie-Pierre d'Udekem d'Acoz, "Voor Koning en vaderland. De Belgische adel in het verzet" (Tielt, 2003)
- Marie-Pierre d'Udekem d'Acoz, "Andrée De Jongh. Une vie de résistante" (Bruxelles, 2016)
- masterscriptie: Merelbeke in de oorlog: analyse en situering van het verzet in een plattelandsgemeente 1940-1944

== Awards ==
- Laureate of the Geheim Leger foundation.
