= Villers-Perwin =

Coordinates: 50.533333°N 4.483333°E

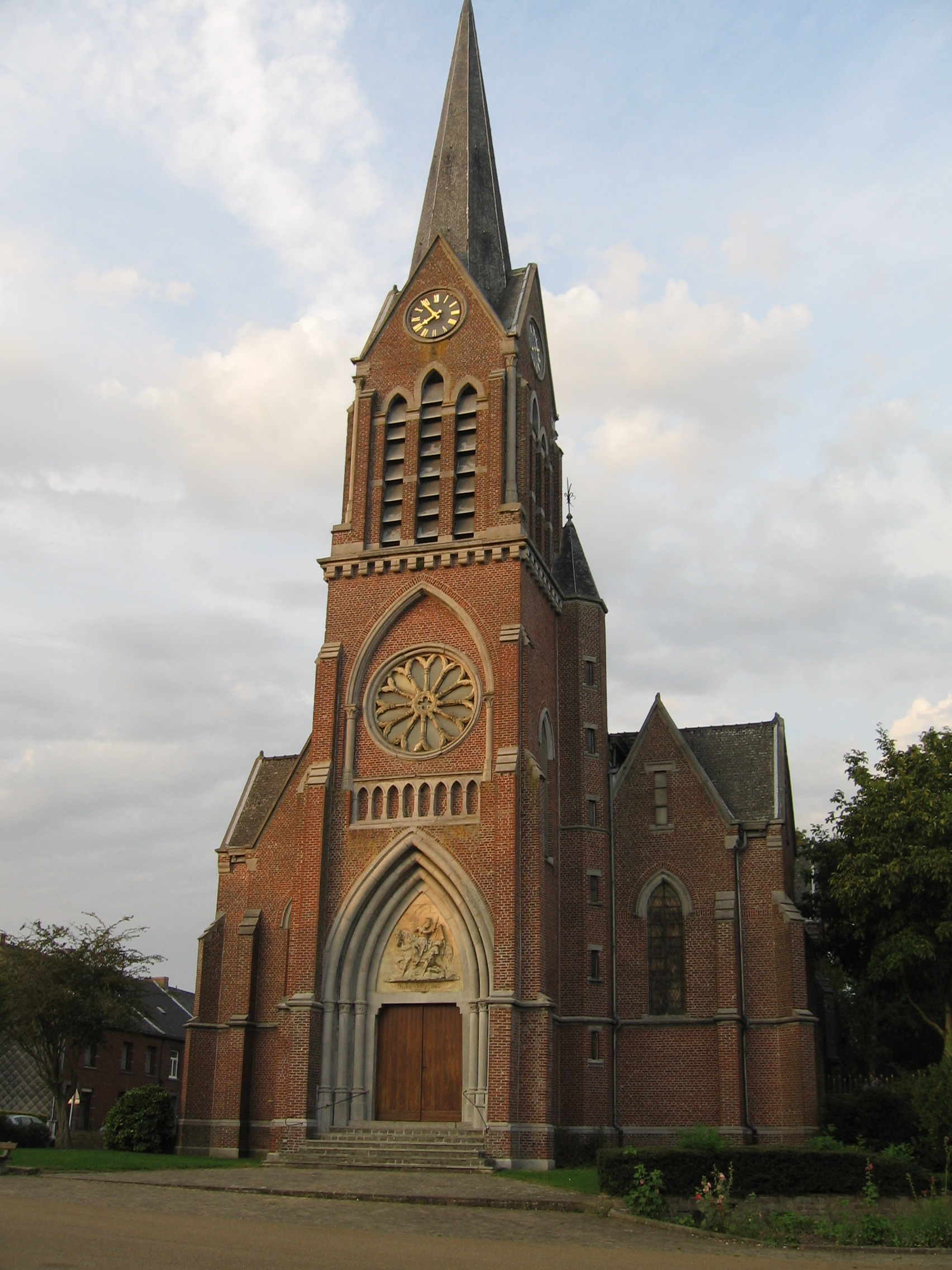
Saint Martin's Church in Villers-Perwin

Villers-Perwin (Walloon: Viyé-Perwin) is a village in Wallonia and a district of the municipality of Les Bons Villers, located in the province of Hainaut, Belgium.
Villers-Perwin was a municipality in its own right until the fusion of the municipalities in Belgium in 1977.

== History ==
Villers-Perwin was part of the Duchy of Brabant for 1,000 years (802–1802) and is now located in the province of Hainaut. The first lords of the village were the Villers-Perwin, then passed successively to the de Walhain (13th century), the de Berghes (15th century) and the de Ligne (16th century). Albert de Ligne sold the seigniory in 1618 to Gérard de Villers, counselor of Archduke Albert and Isabelle. In 1670 it became property of Christophe Hannosset, counselor and receiver general of the province of Brabant. The last lords were the Castro y Toledo and finally the de Renette that built the Chapelle Saint-Hubert in 1760 for the protector of the hunters, celebrated on 3 November and the Chapelle Saint-Jacques in that same year for the protector of the travellers, celebrated on 25 July.
The village is also known for the Battle of Fleurus (1622) fought on its territory with more than 1500 casualties.
This little village possessed a windmill and a brewery. Only a few enterprises were present: a construction atelier, a woodwork assembly firm and a factory of chicory that lasted until just after World War II.
Today it is a residential village with more than 1,300 inhabitants.

=== Heritage ===
- A section of the Roman road between Bavay and Cologne crossing the road between Villers-Perwin and Mellet.
- Saint Martin's Church, built in 1872, with some artistic treasures, the painting Adoration of the Magi (Adoration des mages) by Simon de Ruys de la Haye from the 17th century, and a Christ and gothic cross from the 16th century.
- L'arbre de la Bruyère, the highest point of the region (167 m) with the view of the 15 bell towers.
- The castle, currently owned by a member of the Dumont de Chassart family, built in the 17th, 18th, and 19th centuries.

== Etymology ==
=== Villers ===
The name Villers is from the word villae, and means 'farm, building'. The name Villari means 'outbuilding from the villa' and is commonly used across Gaul. It is therefore believed that the village was part of a villa in Roman times, which is now the actual village.

=== Perwin ===
Various origins are possible for the word Perwin. It is believed that it is referring to the owner of the villa. However, in old French, the P was sometimes replaced by a B, and Perwin would then be Berwin, and Ber means 'bear', which could be referring to the presence of bears in the region when it was covered with forests. Ber means also 'baron', which would be the adviser of the sovereign.

Win could originate from the word wez, which means 'pond' in Walloon. The conclusion would then be a pond where bears came for water.

A second possibility for the origin of the word is from Latin, when the village was called Villers-le-Perwin, Villers-le-Pewyn, or Villers-le-Perwez. Perwin would be derived from the word pervium coming itself from per viam 'near the road'.

== Personalities ==
The well-known violinist Arthur Grumiaux was born in Villers-Perwin in one of the houses of the Place Commandant Bultot.
