= Loverval =

Coordinates: 50°22′N 4°28′E

Loverval (French pronunciation: [lɔvɛʁval]; Walloon: Lavervå) is a village of Wallonia and a district of the municipality of Gerpinnes, located in the province of Hainaut, Belgium.

== History ==
Loverval was formerly a separate municipality and became part of Gerpinnes during the Belgain Municipal mergers of 1977.

== Heritage ==
The Grand Chénait residential development in loverval was laid out between 1925 and 1930 by architects Jules laurent and Marcel Depelsenaire.

Villa Dewez, located in the Grand Chéniat Development, was classified as a monument in 2023.

== Nature ==
Loverval is home to the Verger Naméche state nature reserve, an orchard valued for its ecological diversity and historical importance.
