= Genappe =

City in Walloon Brabant province, Wallonia, Belgium

- City and municipality
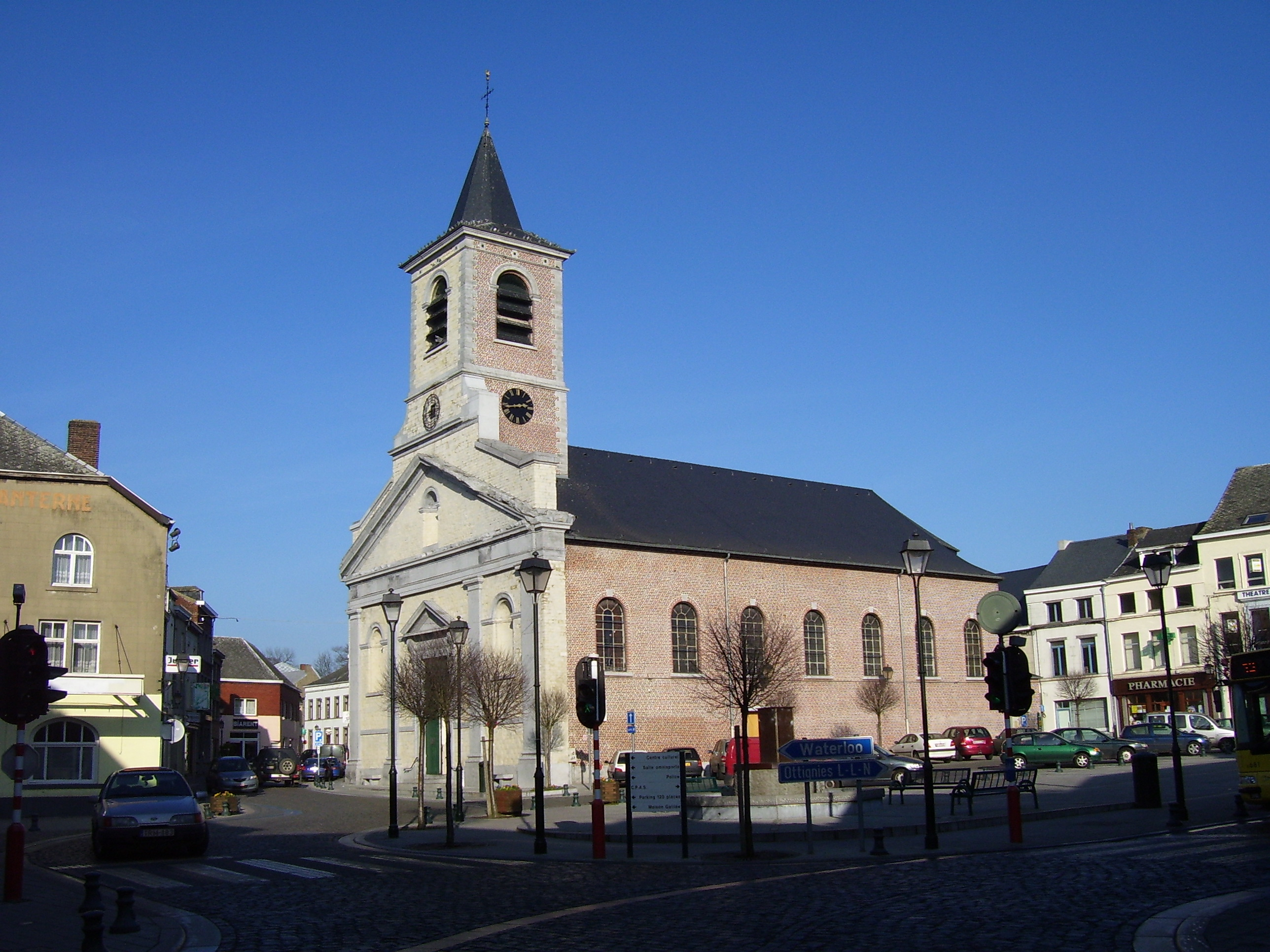

- Flag Coat of arms

- The municipality of Genappe in Walloon Brabant
- Interactive map of Genappe
- Location in Belgium
- Coordinates: 50°36′N 04°27′E
- Country: Belgium
- Community: French Community
- Region: Wallonia
- Province: Walloon Brabant
- Arrondissement: Nivelles

Government
  - Mayor: Gérard Couronné (MR)
  - Governing party: MR - cdH

Area
  - Total: 90.35 km^{2} (34.88 sq mi)

Population (2018-01-01)
  - Total: 15,353
  - Density: 169.9/km^{2} (440.1/sq mi)
- Postal codes: 1470-1474, 1476
- NIS code: 25031
- Area codes: 067
- Website: www.genappe.be

Genappe (French pronunciation: [ʒənap]; Dutch: Genepiën, Dutch pronunciation: [ɣeːˈneːpijə(n)]; Walloon: Djinape) is a municipality and city of Wallonia located in the Belgian province of Walloon Brabant.

== Demographics ==
As of 2023, the municipality of Genappe boasted a population of 14,266 residents. Spanning a total area of 89.57 km^{2}, the region has a population density of 15,26 inhabitants per km^{2}.

== History ==
Although his birthplace was probably Boulogne-sur-Mer, one 13th-century chronicler cites Baisy (now Baisy-Thy in Genappe), as the birthplace of Godfrey of Bouillon, the best-known leader of the First Crusade (1096-1099).

=== Notable people ===
- Alfred Cogniaux (1841–1916), botanist, died in Genappe

=== Postal history ===
The Genappe post-office opened before 1830. It used a postal code 48 with bars (before 1864), and 145 with points before 1870. BOUSVAL opened on 8 April 1880.

Postal codes in 1969 (before the merger of municipalities in 1977): - 1470 Genappe - 1471 Loupoigne - 1472 Vieux-Genappe - 1473 Glabais - 1474 Ways - 1475 Baisy-Thy - 1476 Houtain-le-Val - 1488 Bousval.

== Twinned cities ==
- Narborough, United Kingdom
- Littlethorpe, United Kingdom
- Franklin, Louisiana, United States

== See also ==
- List of protected heritage sites in Genappe
