= Gervais Emmanuel Ducasse =

Haitian painter

Gervais Emmanuel Ducasse (1903–1988) was a Haitian painter. Born in Port-au-Prince, Ducasse painted historical scenes.
