= Air Polonia =

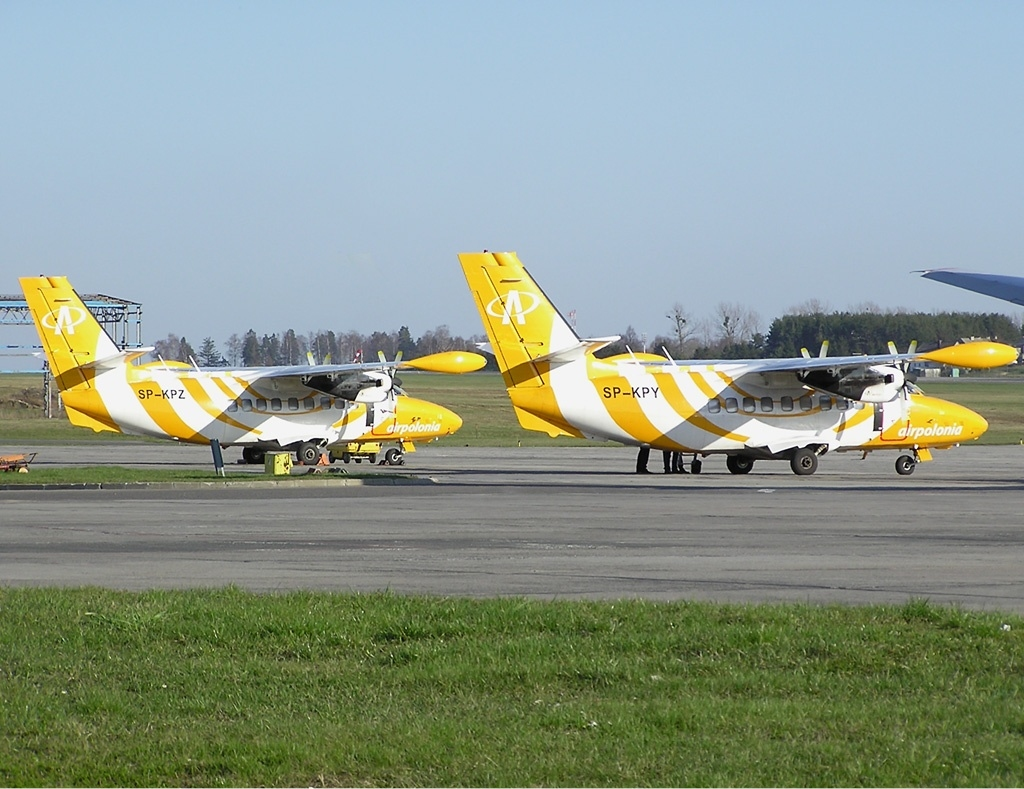
- Both LET 410s of Air Polonia
IATA	ICAO	Call sign
4P	APN	AIR POLONIA
- Founded: 2001
- Commenced operations: 8 December 2003
- Ceased operations: 5 December 2004
- Operating bases: Gdańsk; Katowice; Warsaw; Wrocław
- Fleet size: 6
- Destinations: 28
- Headquarters: Warsaw, Poland
- Website: airpolonia.com

Air Polonia was the first privately owned low-cost airline in Poland with its headquarters in Warsaw and its largest operations base at Warsaw Frédéric Chopin Airport. On 5 December 2004 Air Polonia ceased operations due to financial difficulties.

== History ==
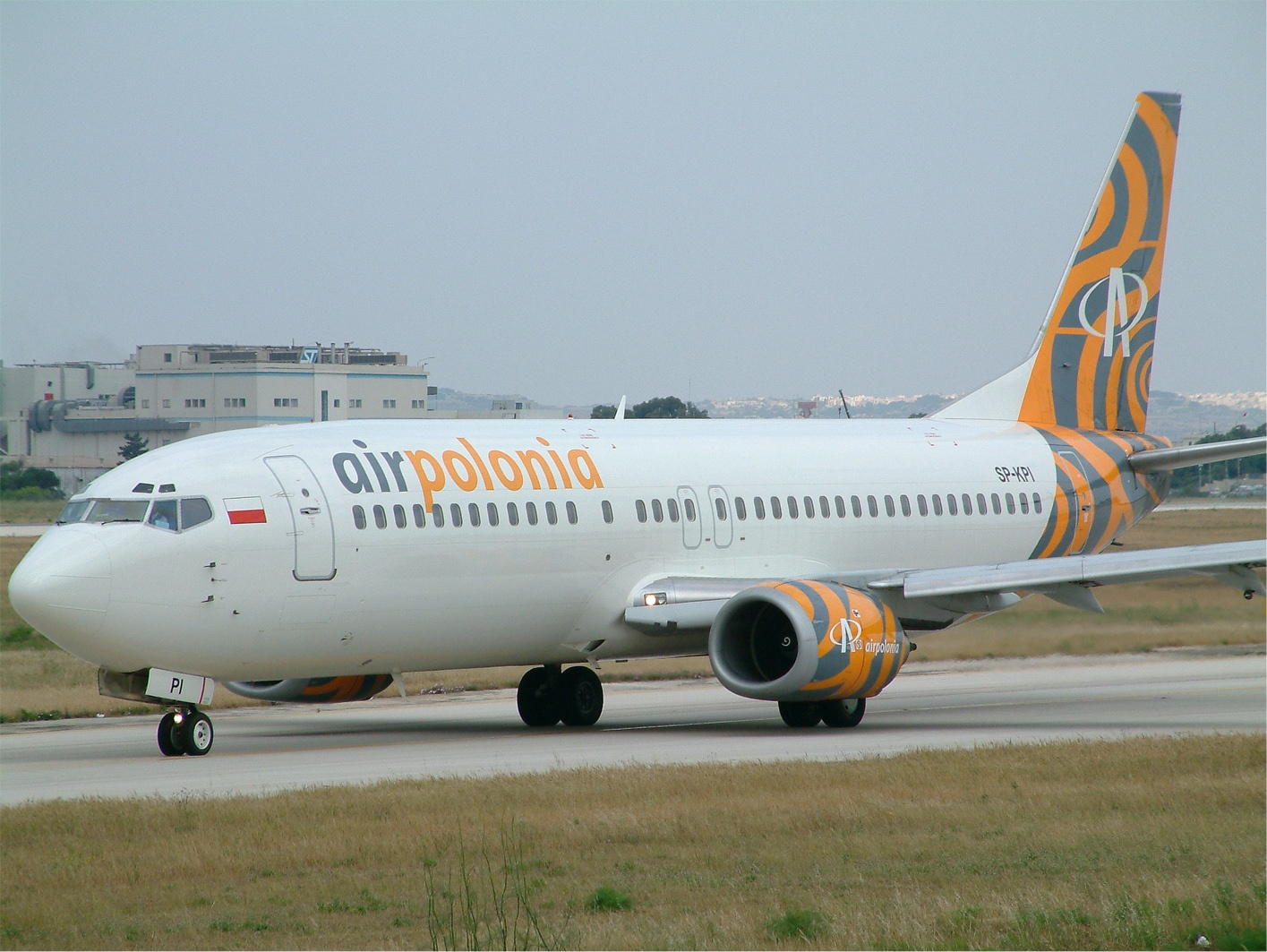
An Air Polonia Boeing 737-400 taxiing at Malta International Airport, Malta (2003)

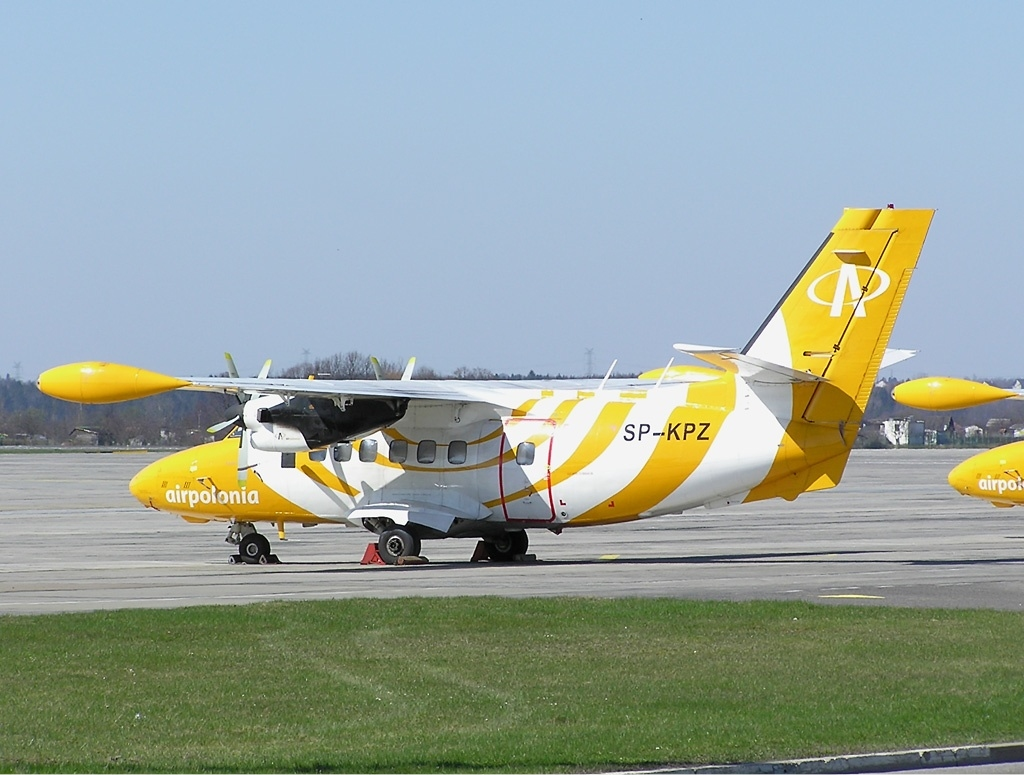
An Air Polonia Let L-410 at Gdańsk Lech Wałęsa Airport, Poland (2004)

Air Polonia was created in 2001 and quickly gained popularity. It started low-cost operations on 8 December 2003 using its Boeing 737-400s offering flights from Warsaw to Wrocław, London Stansted and Gdańsk, Katowice to London Stansted and Poznań to London Stansted.

Air Polonia's marketing campaigns targeted above all LOT but also non-Polish airlines flying to Poland such as British Airways or other no-frills airlines such as Germanwings. It is also speculated that Air Polonia's growing popularity altered Ryanair's expansion into Poland.

== Revival of Air Polonia ==
In January 2005, it was announced that Air Polonia was planning to resume operations with three Boeing 737-400s, but as of September 2019 it had not happened.

== Destinations ==
Air Polonia flew charter and scheduled services across Europe, including to Warsaw (HQ), Gdańsk (base), Katowice (base), Wrocław (base), Poznań, Cologne, Stockholm Arlanda, Stockholm Skavsta, Rome Ciampino, Athens, Beauvais, Brussels, Bydgoszcz, Faro, Frankfurt, London Stansted, Luqa, Madrid, Málaga, Manchester, Monastir, Palma De Mallorca, Paris Charles De Gaulle, Riga, Seville, Sharm El Sheikh, Szczecin and Tenerife.

== Fleet ==
Air Polonia operated the following aircraft throughout operations:

Air Polonia fleet before closure
Aircraft	Total	Routes
Boeing 737-300	2	Short-medium haul
Boeing 737-400	2	Short-medium haul
Let L-410 UVP-E	2	Domestic
Total	6	
