= Frasnes-lez-Gosselies =

- Sub-municipality of Les Bons Villers
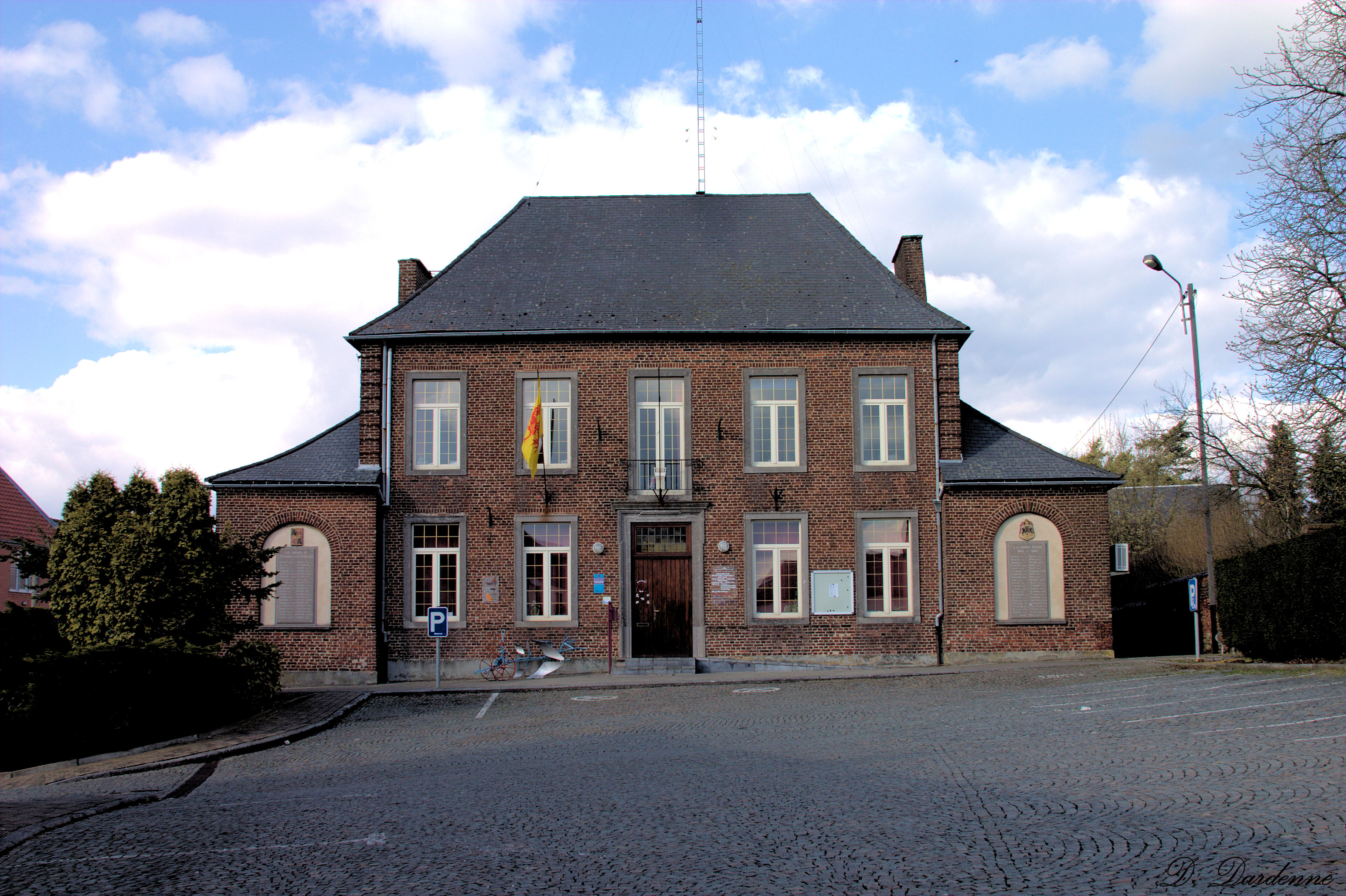
- Les Bon Villiers town hall
- Interactive map of Frasnes-lez-Gosselies
- Location within Belgium Location within Hainaut (Belgium)
- Coordinates: 50°32′12″N 4°27′00″E
- Country: Belgium
- Community: French Community
- Region: Wallonia
- Province: Hainaut
- Arrondissement: Charleroi
- Municipality: Les Bons Villers

Area
  - Total: 14.40 km^{2} (5.56 sq mi)

Population (2020-01-01)
  - Total: 3,417
  - Density: 237.3/km^{2} (614.6/sq mi)
- Postal codes: 6210
- Area codes: 071

Frasnes-lez-Gosselies (French pronunciation: [fʁan le ɡɔsli], lit. 'Frasnes near Gosselies'; Walloon: Fråne-dilé-Gochliye) is a village of Wallonia and a sub-municipality of the municipality of Les Bons Villers, located in the province of Hainaut, Belgium.

== Former names ==
Fraxina (1146; 1147; 1148), Frasna (1148), Fraine (1205; ±1210), Fraxinensis (1205), Fraina (1222).

== Notable natives of Frasnes-lez-Gosselies ==
- Adolphe Biarent (1871–1916), composer
- Paul Vanderborght (1899–1971), poet
- Jean Duvieusart (1900–1977), Former Prime Minister
