= Les Bons Villers =

Municipality in Hainaut Province, Wallonia, Belgium

Les Bons Villers Les Bons Viyés (Walloon)
- Municipality
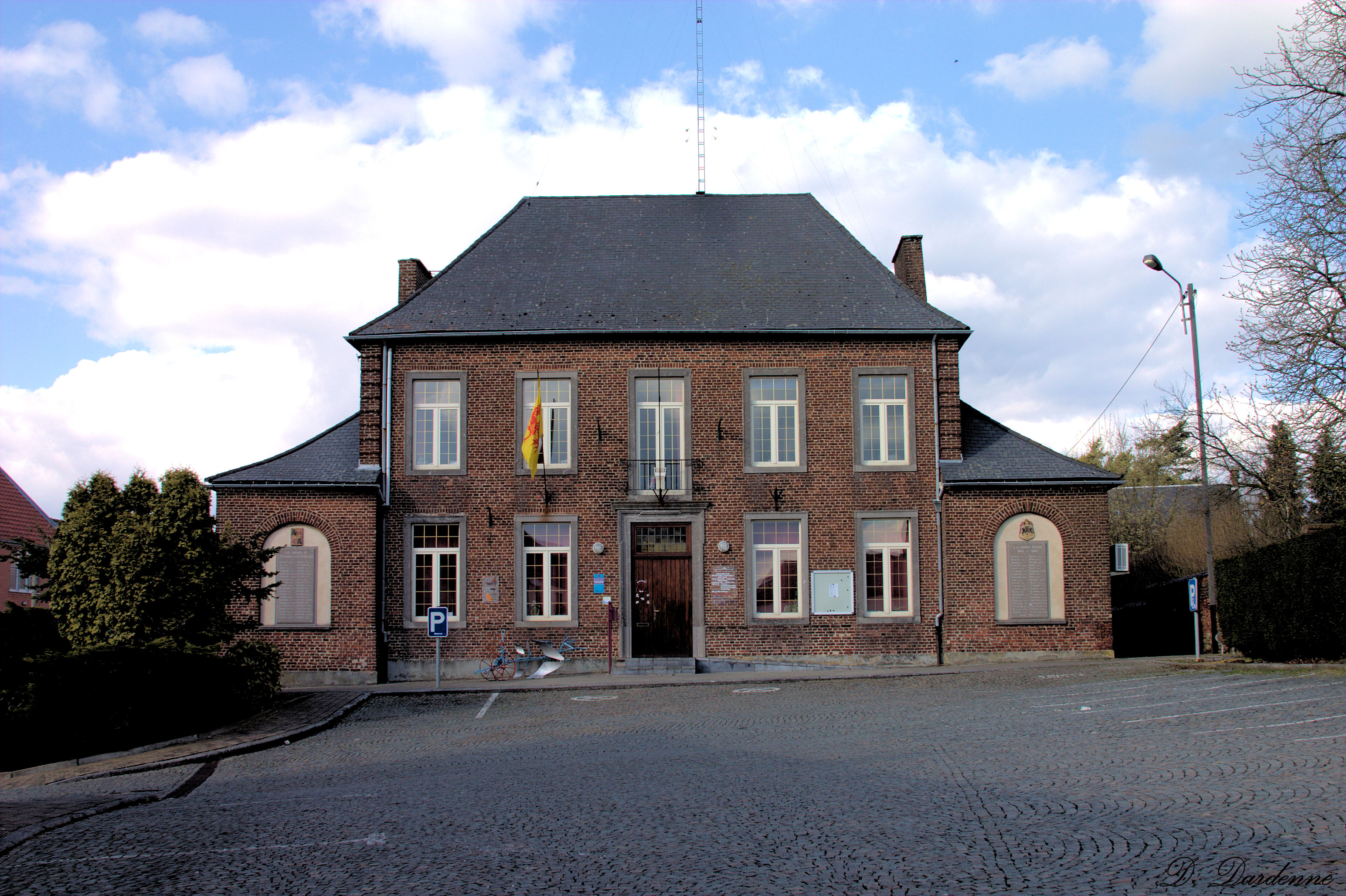
- Town hall

- Flag Coat of arms

- Location of Les Bons Villers in Hainaut
- Interactive map of Les Bons Villers
- Location in Belgium
- Coordinates: 50°32′N 04°27′E
- Country: Belgium
- Community: French Community
- Region: Wallonia
- Province: Hainaut
- Arrondissement: Charleroi

Government
  - Mayor: Mathieu Périn (cdH) (Citoyens)
  - Governing party: Citoyens

Area
  - Total: 42.97 km^{2} (16.59 sq mi)

Population (2018-01-01)
  - Total: 9,457
  - Density: 220.1/km^{2} (570.0/sq mi)
- Postal codes: 6210-6211
- NIS code: 52075
- Area codes: 071
- Website: www.les-bons-villers.be

Les Bons Villers (French pronunciation: [le bɔ̃ vilɛʁs]; Walloon: Les Bons Viyés) is a municipality of Wallonia located in the province of Hainaut, Belgium.

On 1 January 2018 the municipality had 9,457 inhabitants. The total area is 42.55 km^{2}, giving a population density of 222 inhabitants per km^{2}.

The municipality consists of the following districts: Frasnes-lez-Gosselies, Mellet, Rèves, Villers-Perwin and Wayaux.
