= European route E420 =

Road in trans-European E-road network

E420

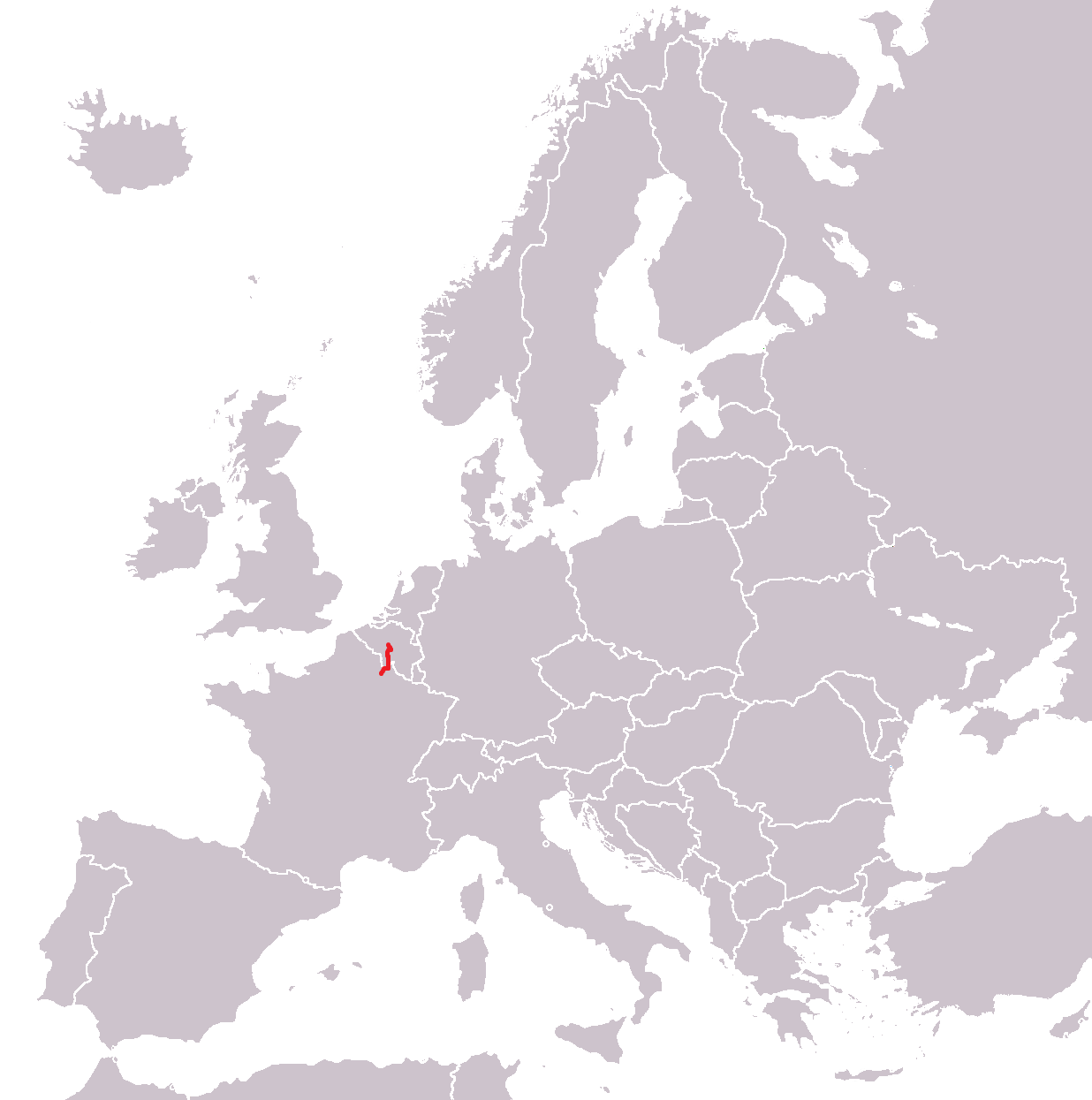

Route information
- Length: 197 km (122 mi)

Major junctions
- From: Nivelles
- Charleroi
- To: Reims

Location
- Countries: Belgium; France

Highway system
- International E-road network; A Class; B Class

European route E 420 is a north-south European route from Nivelles in Belgium to Reims in France.

== Route ==
- Belgium
  - E19 Nivelles
  - Charleroi
- France
  - E17, E46, E50 Reims
