= Gosselies =

Gosselies Gochliye (Walloon)
- Former municipality of Belgium
- Coat of arms

- Location in the municipality of Charleroi

- Location in Belgium
- Coordinates: 50°28′7.524″N 4°25′55.006″E
- Country: Belgium
- Region: Wallonia
- Community: French Community
- Province: Hainaut
- Municipality: Charleroi

Area
  - Total: 4.66 sq mi (12.08 km^{2})

Population (2001)
  - Total: 11,246
- Time zone: UTC+1 (CET)
  - Summer (DST): UTC+2 (CEST)
- Postal code: 6041
- Area code: 071

Gosselies (French pronunciation: [ɡɔsli]; Walloon: Gochliye) is a town of Wallonia and a district of the municipality of Charleroi, located in the province of Hainaut, Belgium.

Located in the north of Charleroi, it was a city and a municipality of its own before the merger of the municipalities in 1977. Gosselies was the home of the headquarters of Caterpillar Belgium, as well as Solar Turbines Europe. The Brussels South Charleroi Airport (BSCA) is located in Gosselies too.

On the pre-metro line M3, opened in June 2013, there are nine stations located in Gosselies. Since this date, Gosselies has been re-connected with the center of Charleroi and the SNCB Charleroi-South railway station by tram.

== People born in Gosselies ==
- Charles Joseph Léopold Preux (1794–1861), valiant officer of Napoleon Bonaparte and mayor of Gosselies
- Edmond Dauchot (1905–1978), photographer, poet and engraver
- Jean-Pierre Lecocq (1947–1992), molecular biologist and entrepreneur

== Sights ==
The tower of the former castle of Bousies family.

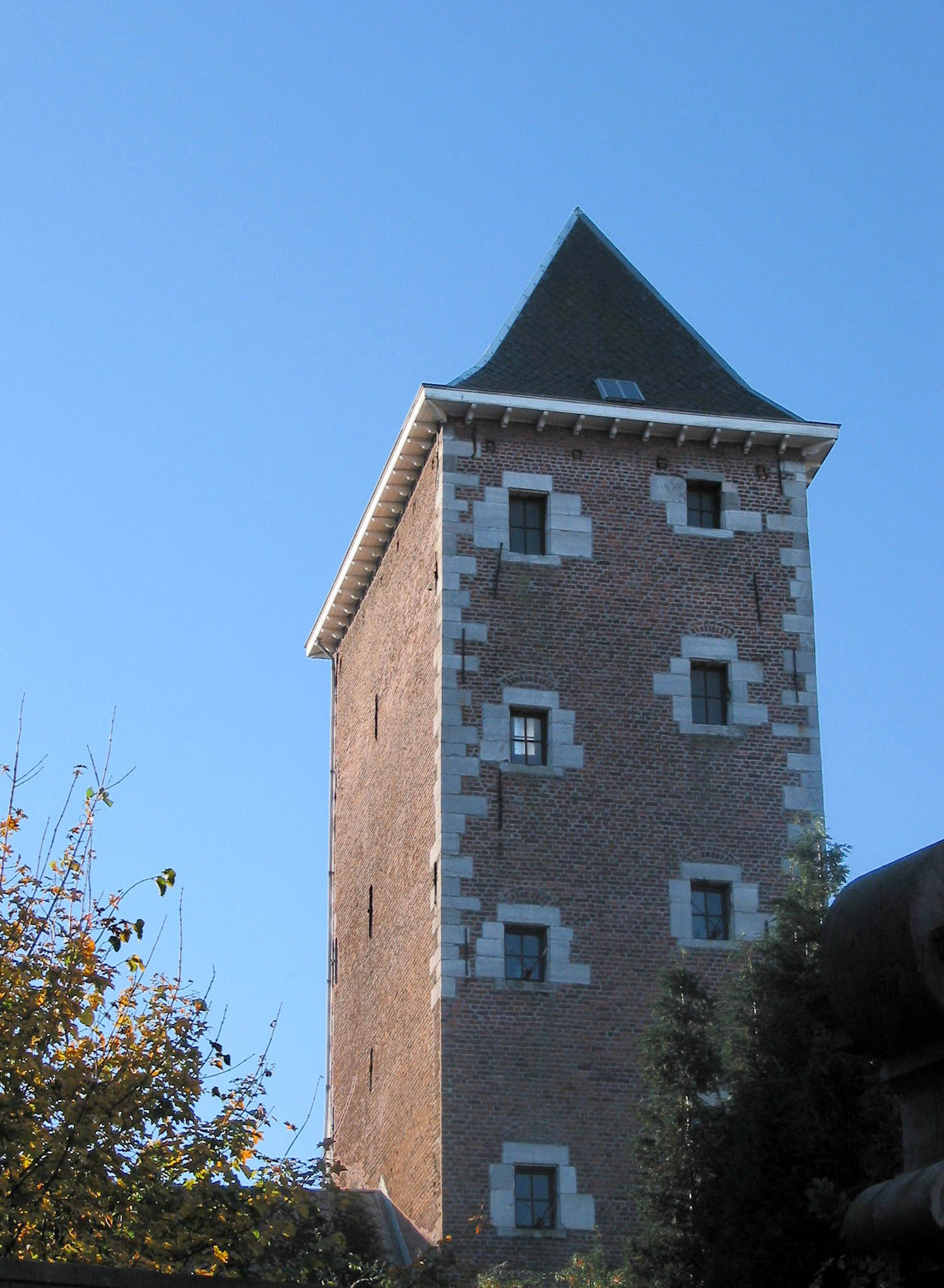
Tower of the castle (1435).
