= Gerpinnes =

Municipality in Hainaut Province, Wallonia, Belgium

Gerpinnes Djerpene (Walloon)
- Municipality
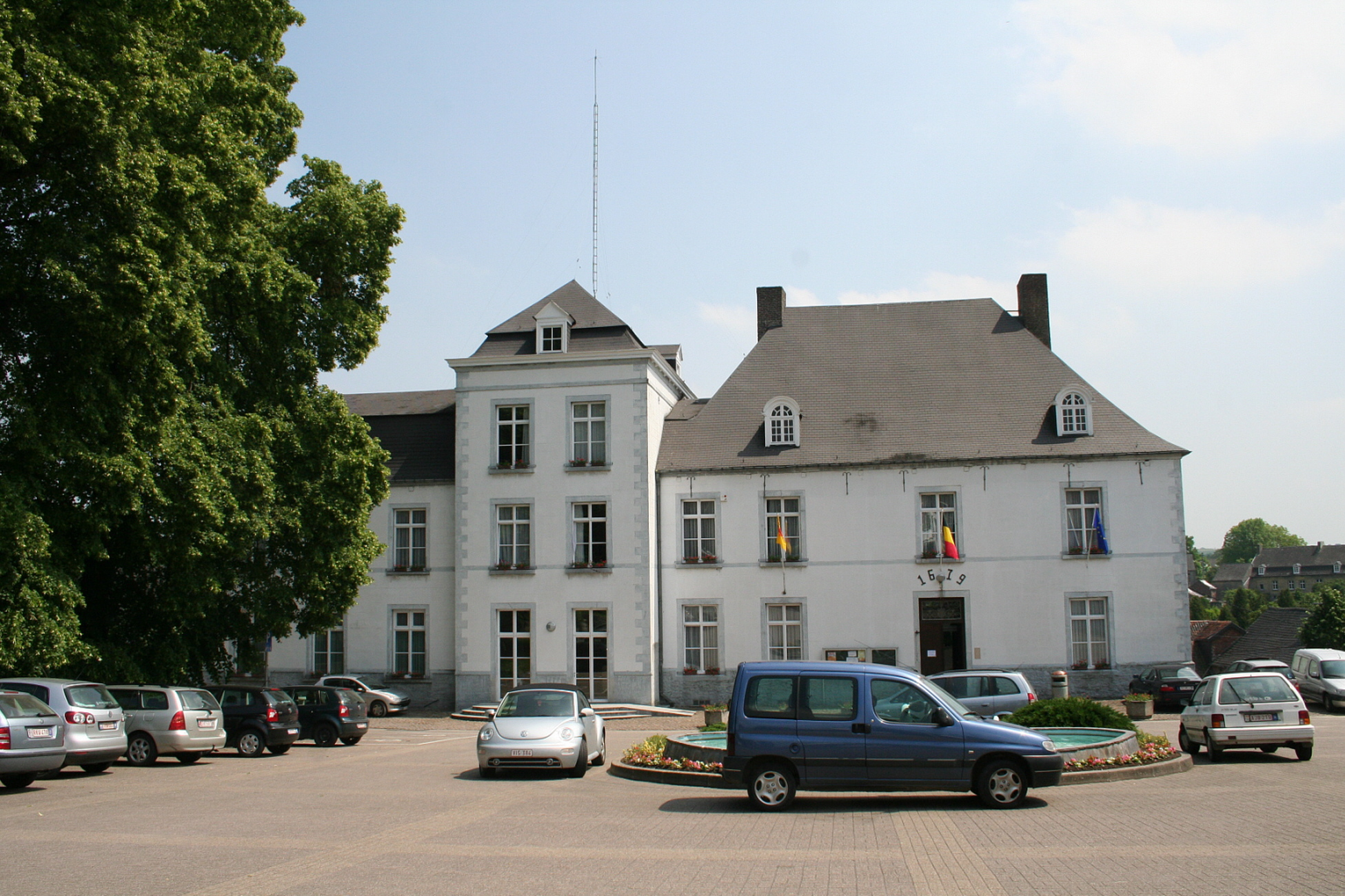
- Gerpinnes town hall

- Flag Coat of arms

- Location of Gerpinnes in Hainaut
- Interactive map of Gerpinnes
- Location in Belgium
- Coordinates: 50°20′N 04°31′E
- Country: Belgium
- Community: French Community
- Region: Wallonia
- Province: Hainaut
- Arrondissement: Charleroi

Government
  - Mayor: Philippe Busine (CDH)
  - Governing parties: CDH, MR

Area
  - Total: 47.68 km^{2} (18.41 sq mi)

Population (2018-01-01)
  - Total: 12,660
  - Density: 265.5/km^{2} (687.7/sq mi)
- Postal codes: 6280
- NIS code: 52025
- Area codes: 071
- Website: www.gerpinnes.be

Gerpinnes (French pronunciation: [ʒɛʁ.pin]; Walloon: Djerpene) is a municipality of Wallonia located in the province of Hainaut, Belgium.

On 1 January 2018 the municipality had 12,660 inhabitants. The total area is 47.10 km^{2}, giving a population density of 269 inhabitants per km^{2}.

Every year at Whitsun, a large procession is organised in honour of Saint Rolendis (Sainte Rolende). Participants are dressed as Napoleonic soldiers, and walk about 40 km around the whole municipality.

== Villages and towns ==
- Acoz (site of Acoz Castle)
- Gougnies
- Joncret
- Loverval
- Villers-Poterie

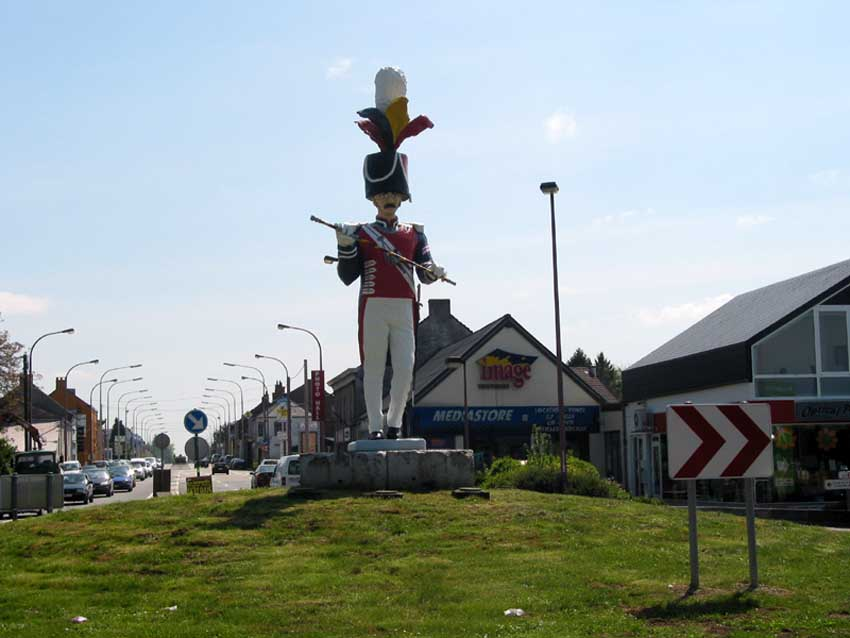
Gerpinnes: the drum major
