= ML Aviation =

British aerospace company

- Industry: Aviation
- Founded: 1934 as Wrightson Aircraft Sales
- Defunct: 1997
- Fate: acquired by Cobham plc
- Headquarters: Slough, United Kingdom
- Number of locations: White Waltham
- Key people: Marcel Lobelle
- Products: aircraft components

ML Aviation was a British aerospace company. Until 1946 it was R Malcolm & Co, taking its new name from the businessman Noel Mobbs and the aircraft designer Marcel Lobelle. R Malcolm & Co. developed the "Malcolm hood", an improved visibility aircraft canopy for, initially, the Supermarine Spitfire during the war.

== History ==
The company Wrightson Aircraft Sales was formed in 1934, this became Malcolm and Farquharson in 1936 and a separate company R. Malcom & Co was formed from that. By 1939 Malcolm and Farquharson was a holding company for R. Malcolm which made aircraft components including plywood structures. The company expanded due to increased demand during the Second World War. To accommodate this, a drawing office and experimental works was set up at White Waltham in Berkshire with production activities staying at Slough.

In 1943, Mobbs who had bought into R. Malcolm in 1940 took full control of the company with Lobelle, who had left Fairey Aviation Company in 1940 to join R Malcolm, named as chief designer. (Note: Mobbs, together with Percival Parry had formed Slough Estates in 1920, Slough Estates was the owner of Slough Trading Estate where R. Malcom operated.) Lobelle became a director of the company shortly after. The White Waltham site became ML Aviation, the Slough site "ML Engineering".

Post war, ML Aviation made, among other products, aircraft handling and weapons stores equipment. In 1990, ML Aviation's holding company merged the White Waltham activities with newly acquired Wallop Industries at Andover, Hampshire; ML Engineering subsequently moved from Slough to Andover. In the 1996 ML Aviation took over Nash & Thompson. In 1997 ML Aviation was acquired by Cobham plc.

== Products ==
- Hafner Rotabuggy - also known as "Malcolm Rotaplane" or "Flying Jeep". Work began in 1942 to a design by Raoul Hafner of a Willys Jeep fitted with a rotor and tail assembly for the Airborne Forces Experimental Establishment. Although the prototype flew, it was swiftly abandoned.
- Ejector Seats. The Malcolm/ML ejector seat dates back to 1944 and was developed to the same requirement as the seat developed by Martin-Baker. The first dummy airborne ejection was made from a modified Boulton Paul Defiant in October 1945. Modified with a mechanism to jettison the canopy automatically, the seat was designated as the Mk.2. On 3 April 1951, the prototype Hawker P.1081 was lost in a crash which resulted in the death of its test pilot, Sqn Ldr ‘Wimpy’ Wade. Although the seat operated, Sqn Ldr Wade was not able to separate himself from the seat. It was reported widely that his head may have struck the canopy on ejection but the official accident report states that he ejected in a steep dive at 0.98M at 2000 feet (610 M), outside the design parameters of the seat. ML meanwhile produced prototypes of the Mk.3 and Mk.4 seats which had automatic pilot separation and parachute deployment. The Mk.4 ML seat differed from the earlier marks by replacing the face-blind firing handle with pistol grip firing handles either side of the seat pan. Development of the ML ejector seat ceased in 1952. ML Aviation designed and manufactured a modified gun for the Folland lightweight ejector seat built under licence from SAAB for the Folland Gnat fighter and trainer.
- ML Utility. In 1954, ML Aviation received a contract from the Ministry of Supply to develop a light utility aircraft with an inflatable wing which had originated at the Research and Development Establishment, RAF Cardington. Three aircraft were flown before the project was abandoned in 1958.

== Citations ==
=== Bibliography ===
- Carter, Graham (2006). ML Aviation Ltd: A Secret World. Startley, Chippenham: Keyham Books. ISBN 0-952-7715-6-X.
- ML Aviation
