= Fairey Fox =

Multi-role combat aircraft family by Fairey

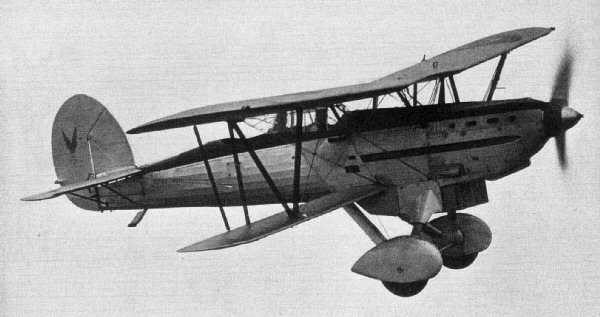
- Fairey Fox Mk.IV of the Belgian Air Force.

General information
- Type: Light bomber
- Manufacturer: Fairey Aviation
- Designer: Marcel Lobelle
- Primary users: Royal Air Force Belgian Air Force; Air Force of Peru

History
- Introduction date: June, 1926 (Mk.I)
- First flight: 3 January 1925 (Mk.I)
- Retired: 1945 Swiss Air Force

The Fairey Fox was a British light bomber and fighter biplane of the 1920s and 1930s. It was originally produced in Britain for the RAF, but continued in production and use in Belgium long after it was retired in Britain.

== Development and design ==
=== Fox I ===
In 1923, Charles Richard Fairey, founder and chief designer of Fairey Aviation, disappointed with his Fawn bomber, which owing to the constraints of Air Ministry specifications, was slower than the Airco DH.9A which it was meant to replace while carrying no greater bombload, conceived the idea of a private venture bomber not subject to official limitations, which could demonstrate superior performance and handling. On seeing the Curtiss CR, powered by a Curtiss D-12 V-12 liquid-cooled engine of low frontal area and in a low drag installation, win the 1923 Schneider Trophy race, Fairey realised that this engine would be well suited to a new bomber and acquired an example of the engine and a licence for production.

Fairey began design of a bomber around this engine, with detailed design carried out by a team at first led by Frank Duncanson and then by the Belgian Marcel Lobelle. The resultant aircraft, the Fairey Fox, was a single-bay biplane with highly staggered wings, with a composite wood and metal structure. The Curtiss D-12 was installed in a closely cowled tractor installation, with one radiator mounted on the underside of the upper wing, and a second retractable radiator that could be wound in and out of the fuselage as required. Pilot and gunner sat close together in two tandem cockpits, with the gunner armed with a Lewis gun on a specially designed high-speed gun mounting that allowed the gun to be stowed to reduce drag, with the pilot armed with a single synchronised Vickers machine gun. Up to 460 lb (210 kg) of bombs could be carried under the wings, aimed by the gunner whose seat folded to allow use of a bombsight.

The prototype Fox first flew at RAF Hendon on 3 January 1925, piloted by Norman Macmillan, quickly demonstrating good performance and handling. Despite this, there was much resistance to the new bomber within the Air Ministry, with the Fox not designed to an official specification and having several features, such as fuel tanks within the fuselage, that went against official norm, and most importantly, it featured an American engine. (Note: Although Fairey had negotiated a license for the D-12, in the end it built no engines, with 50 engines being imported.) However, on seeing the prototype Fox being demonstrated on 28 July 1925, Air Chief Marshal Hugh Trenchard, the Chief of the Air Staff, announced that "Mr Fairey, I have decided to order a squadron of these machines", thus shortcutting official channels, an initial order for 18 Foxes following.

=== Second generation Foxes ===
In 1926 the Air Ministry drew up Specification 12/26 for a new light-bomber for the Royal Air Force. Unlike previous specifications, high performance was stressed, and many of the overly prescriptive requirements which had previously limited performance removed. At first, Fairey was not informed of the new specification, and only received a copy after protesting to the Air Ministry. To meet the requirement, Lobelle's team designed the Fox IIM, effectively an all-new aircraft with a metal structure as demanded by the Specification, and powered by a Rolls-Royce F.XIB (later named the Rolls-Royce Kestrel. It first flew on 25 October 1929. The competing Hawker Hart and Avro Antelope prototypes had been flying for over a year by this time, and the Hart had received an initial production order in June 1929. Although the Fox IIM was not wanted by the RAF, Fairey demonstrated it to the Belgian Air Force, which wanted a light bomber to replace its Breguet 19s and had already bought Fairey Firefly II fighters from Fairey which had also set up a Belgian subsidiary, Avions Fairey, to build the Firefly. The Fox IIM was successful, winning an initial order for 12 Fox II reconnaissance aircraft to be built in England, with further production to come from Avions Fairey.

== Operational history ==
The Fox entered service with No. 12 Squadron RAF in June 1926. The Fox proved to have spectacular performance, being 50 mph (80 km/h) faster than the Fairey Fawns that it replaced in 12 Squadron, and as fast as contemporary fighters. Such was the performance of the Fox that 12 Squadron was instructed to fly no faster than 140 mph (225 km/h) during annual Air Defence Exercises in order to give the defending fighters a chance. Despite this, no further RAF squadrons were equipped with the Fox, and only 28 were purchased in total, with later aircraft being powered by the Kestrel engine and surviving Curtiss engined aircraft being re-fitted with the Kestrel. 12 Squadron, which later adopted a fox's mask as squadron badge in memory of their sole usage of the aircraft, remained equipped with the Fox until 1931, being finally replaced by the Hawker Hart. Foxes remained in use as dual control trainers at the Royal Air Force College Cranwell until 1933.

Two superannuated Fox Mk.Is took part in the 1934 MacRobertson Air Race from London to Melbourne. One of them occasioned the only fatalities of the race when it crashed in Italy. The other, commanded by Australian Ray Parer (a veteran of the 1919 England to Australia Air Race), had struggled no further than Paris when news came through that the race winner had completed the course. Parer and co-pilot Geoff Hemsworth continued an epic and eventful journey, taking nearly four months to reach Melbourne. The aircraft saw some use carrying freight in Papua New Guinea with the Pacific Aerial Transport Company (PAT) for a short time in 1936.

The first Fox IIs entered service with the Belgian Air Force in early 1932 as a reconnaissance aircraft, with one winning the "Circuit of the Alps" race for two-seat military aircraft at the 1932 Zurich Aviation meeting. The Fox continued in production at Avions Fairey at Gosselies for much of the 1930s, forming the backbone of the Belgian Air Force, being used as reconnaissance, reconnaissance-bomber and two-seater fighters. Later aircraft were fitted with enclosed canopies and more powerful Hispano-Suiza 12Y engines.

Over 100 Foxes were still in front-line service with the Belgian Air Force at the time of the German invasion on 10 May 1940. Although massively outclassed by the aircraft of the Luftwaffe they flew about 75 sorties and even claimed one kill of a Messerschmitt Bf 109.

== Variants ==
Fox I
Mixed construction light bomber for RAF. Powered by 450 hp (338 kW) Curtiss D-12 engine (also known as Fairey Felix). 25 built (including prototype).
Fox IA
Fox I powered by 490 hp (366 kW) Rolls-Royce Kestrel engine. Three built as new plus eight conversions.
Fox IIM
Metal construction light bomber powered by 480 hp (358 kW) Rolls-Royce Kestrel IB. One prototype.
Fox II
Production version of IIM for Belgium. Supercharged Kestrel IIS engine. 12 built by Fairey in Britain, and a further 31 under licence by Belgian Avions Fairey at Gosselies (including two Fox IIS dual control aircraft).
Fox III
Designation used for British built, Kestrel powered demonstrator (later designated Fox IV) and for Belgian built dual control trainer (also Fox Trainer) powered by 360 hp (270 kW) Armstrong Siddeley Serval engine.
Fox IIIS
Fox Trainer converted with Kestrel IIMS. Five additional production aircraft by Avions Fairey.
Fox III
Kestrel IIS and two forward-firing machine guns. 13 built at Gosselies.
Fox IIIC
(C for Combat) – Bomber/reconnaissance version for Belgium powered by Kestrel IIS, with provision for underwing bombs, two forward-firing machine guns and enclosed cockpit. 48 built in Belgium, including one Fox Mk IIICS dual-control trainer. Last few fitted with 600 hp 448 kW) Kestrel V engine.
Fox IV
Used for British built demonstrator (ex Fox III).
Fox IV
Fox II converted with Hispano-Suiza 12Ybrs engine. First flew 31 January 1934.
Fox IV
British built floatplane (Fox Floatplane). Six were produced for the Peruvian Air Force to serve during the Colombia-Peru War of 1933, but by the time they had been delivered (in October 1933), the war was over. They later (with the floats removed) carried out observation duties in the Ecuadorian–Peruvian War in 1941.
Fox VIR
Reconnaissance version powered by 860 hp (642 kW) Hispano-Suiza 12Ydrs engine. 24 built for Belgium and two for Switzerland.
Fox VIC
Two-seat fighter version of VIC. 52 built.
Fox VII
Single-seat fighter version of the Fox Mk.VIR (also known as the Mono-Fox or Kangourou Provision for six machine guns. Only two aircraft were built. One converted back to Fox VI standard and one used as personal aircraft by Willy Coppens.
Fox VIII
Final production version ordered as a result of international tensions in 1938. Based on VI but with three-bladed propeller and provision for four underwing guns. 12 built, with final aircraft completed 25 May 1939.

== Operators ==
Belgium

- Belgian Air Force

Peru

- Peruvian Air Force
- Peruvian Navy

Switzerland

- Swiss Air Force – Switzerland received two Fox VIR for evaluation.

United Kingdom

- Royal Air Force
  - No. 12 Squadron RAF

== Specifications (Fairey Fox VIR) ==
Data from War Planes of the Second World War: Volume Seven Bombers and Reconnaissance Aircraft

General characteristics

- Crew: 2
- Length: 30 ft 9 in (9.37 m)
- Wingspan: 37 ft 11 in (11.56 m)
- Height: 11 ft 6.5 in (3.518 m)
- Wing area: 362 sq ft (33.6 m^{2})
- Empty weight: 2,920 lb (1,324 kg)
- Gross weight: 5,170 lb (2,345 kg)
- Powerplant: 1 × Hispano-Suiza 12Ybrs V-12 liquid-cooled piston engine, 860 hp (640 kW)
- Propellers: 2-bladed fixed-pitch propeller

Performance

- Maximum speed: 224 mph (360 km/h, 195 kn)
- Range: 634 mi (1,020 km, 551 nmi)
- Service ceiling: 32,800 ft (10,000 m)
- Time to altitude:

- 16,400 ft (5,000 m) in 6 minutes 30 seconds
- 19,700 ft (6,000 m) in 8 minutes 21 seconds

Armament

- Guns: 2 × forward firing machine guns and 1 × rear gun
- Bombs: 220 lb (100 kg)

== See also ==
Related development

- Fairey Firefly IIM

Aircraft of comparable role, configuration, and era

- Hawker Hart
- Renard R.31
