= Noel Mobbs =

British Businessman (1878–1859)

Sir Noel Mobbs KCVO OBE
- Sir Noel Mobbs KCVO OBE
- Born: 1878; Northampton, England
- Died: 1959 (aged 80–81)
- Education: Bedford Modern School
- Known for: Founder of Slough Estates

Sir Arthur Noel Mobbs KCVO OBE (1878–1959) was the founder of Slough Estates, one of the United Kingdom's largest property businesses.

== Career ==
Brought up in Northampton, Mobbs was educated at Bedford Modern School. Together with his brother, Herbert, he founded the Pytchley Autocar Company in 1903 to sell private vehicles: the business was later bought by Mercantile Credit. Another of Noel's brothers, Edgar, was a well-known Rugby player and Captain of the England team in 1910.

In 1920, Noel Mobbs and Sir Percival Perry acquired Slough Depot, a vehicle park where thousands of disused military vehicles had been abandoned. They sold the vehicles and converted the factories and let them out for industrial use, so establishing the Slough Trading Estate.

Mobbs was also keen to establish sporting and social facilities for the people of Slough and in 1928 he bought Stoke Park Golf Club for £30,000 and reformed it. He also established the Stoke Poges Memorial Gardens which are open to the public as well as the Slough Community Centre which opened in 1936.

Mobbs had financed the R Malcolm & Co aircraft component company and in 1943 took control with himself as managing director and Marcel Lobelle as chief designer. Lobelle became a director and the company was renamed ML Aviation after their initials.

He was appointed a Knight Commander of the Royal Victorian Order in 1948.

Mobbs was an avid bridge player and in 1950, he chaired the British Bridge League. He died in Bournemouth in 1959.

== Family ==
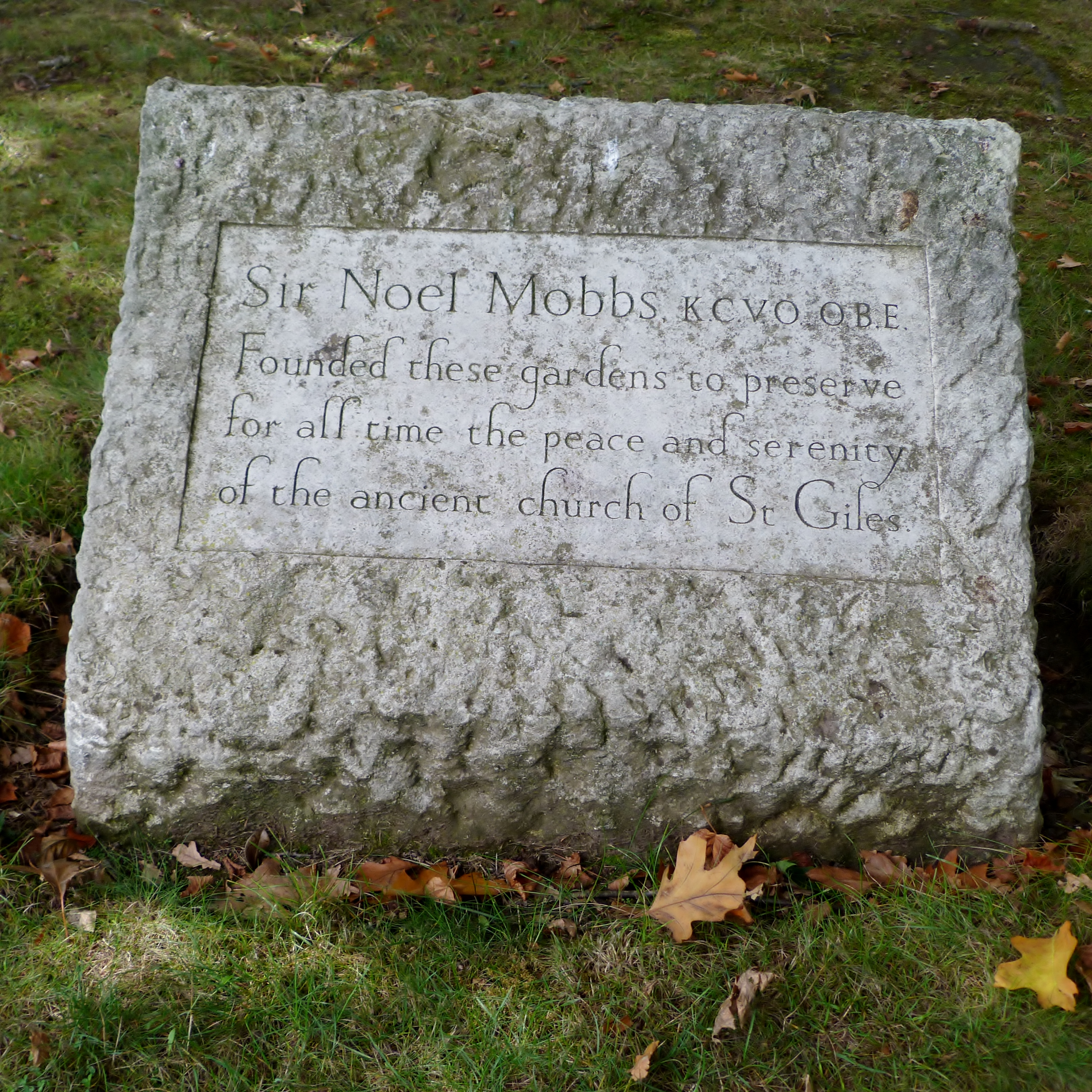
Memorial stone in Stoke Poges Garden of Remembrance, Buckinghamshire

He married Frances. His grandson was Nigel Mobbs, a more recent chairman of Slough Estates.
