= Marcel Lobelle =

Marcel Jules Odilon Lobelle (March 9 1893 - August 30 1967) was a Belgian aeronautical engineer who spent his professional career working in Britain.

== Early life ==
He was born in Kortrijk, Flanders.

He fought in the Belgian Army at the start of World War I, with the 1st Regiment of Grenadiers. He was seriously wounded in the fighting for Tervaete during the Battle of the Yser in October 1914.

== Career ==
On being discharged from the army in 1917, he moved to Britain, taking employment with the Tarrant Company, and then Martinsyde, before eventually becoming chief designer at Fairey Aviation.

Lobelle left Fairey in 1940 and joined the R. Malcolm Company, which became ML Aviation in 1946 (after Noel Mobbs and Lobelle, the managing director and chief designer respectively).

=== Aircraft ===
- Fairey Firefly I (1925)
- Fairey Fox (1925)
- Fairey Firefly II (1929)
- Fairey Swordfish (1934)
- Fairey Battle (1936)
- Fairey P.4/34 (1937)
- Fairey Fulmar (1937)
- Fairey Albacore (1938)
- Fairey Barracuda (1940)

== Personal life ==
He died at Wexham Park Hospital on 30 August 1967. The death notice stated that he was aged 74 and that he was married to Doris.

== Notes and references ==
- History of ML Aviation
