= Stoke Poges Memorial Gardens =

Coordinates: 51°32′01″N 0°35′45″W

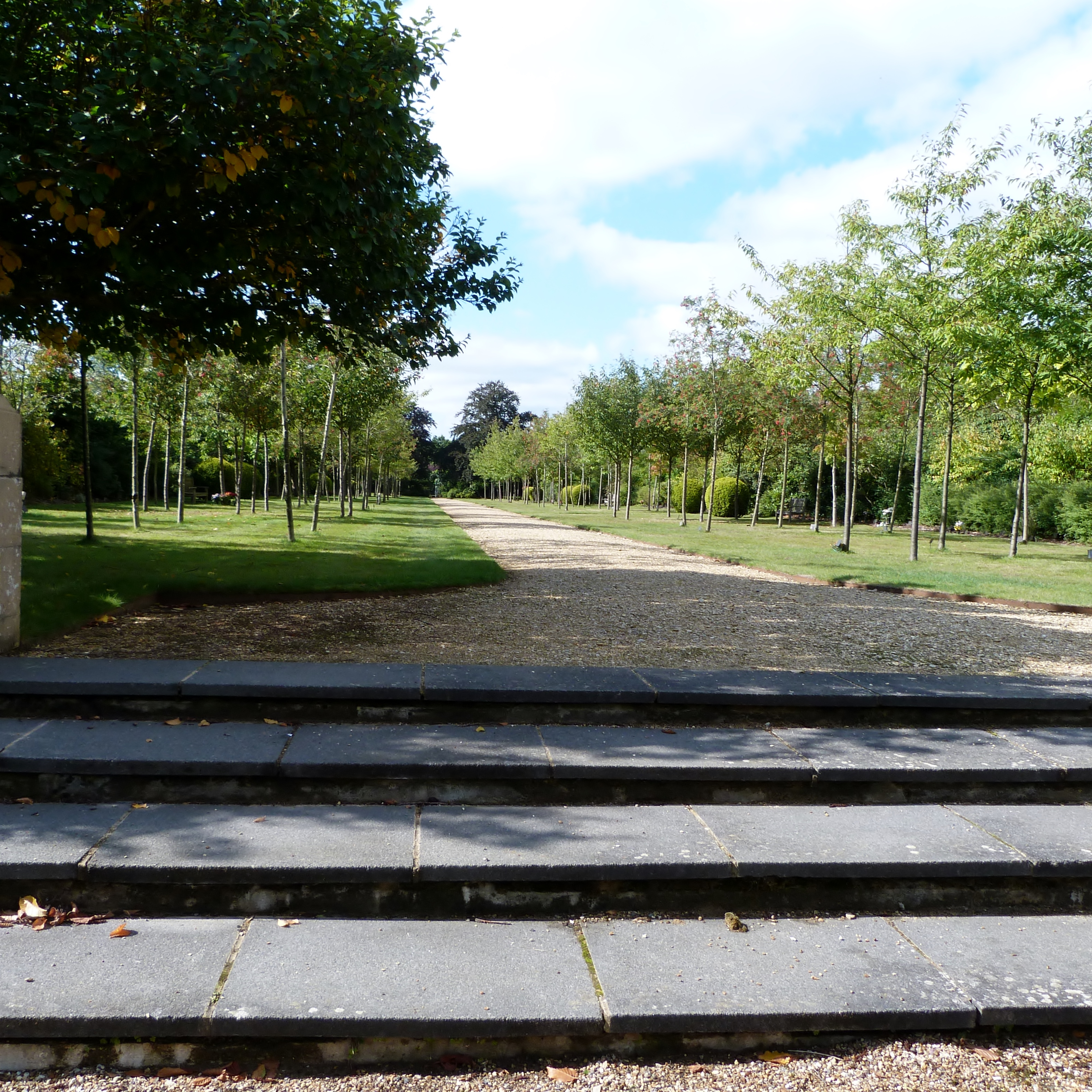
Stoke Poges Memorial Gardens, 2013

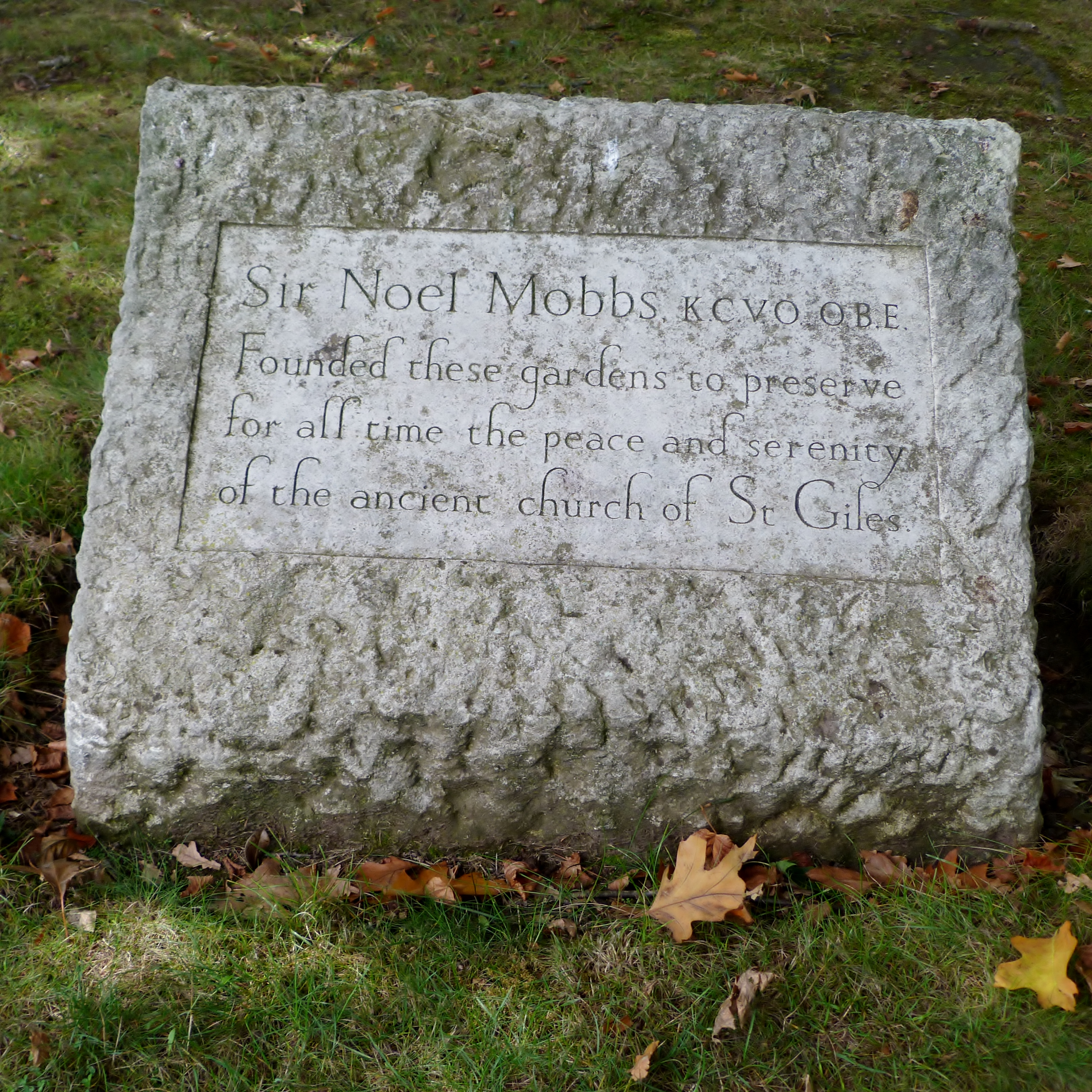
Memorial to Noel Mobbs in the Memorial Gardens

The Stoke Poges Memorial Gardens in Buckinghamshire, England are listed Grade I on the Register of Historic Parks and Gardens. They are adjacent to the Church of St Giles in the village of Stoke Poges.

The Memorial Gardens were founded in 1935 by Sir Noel Mobbs to ensure "the maintenance in perpetuity of the peace, quietness and beauty of the ancient church and churchyard". The gardens were landscaped by Edward White and contain a number of private plots for the interment of ashes, within a larger, Grade I listed park. The ashes of the film director Alexander Korda, aviation pioneer John Moore-Brabazon, 1st Baron Brabazon of Tara and the broadcaster Kenneth Horne, among others, are interred in the garden.
