= Fairey Firefly I =

1920s prototype fighter biplane

Firefly

General information
- Type: Fighter
- National origin: United Kingdom
- Manufacturer: Fairey
- Designer: Marcel Lobelle
- Number built: 1

History
- First flight: 9 November 1925

The Fairey Firefly was a British fighter of the 1920s from Fairey Aviation. It was a single-seat, single-engine biplane of mixed construction.

== Development ==
The Firefly was a private-venture design, penned by Marcel Lobelle. It was first flown on 9 November 1925 by Norman Macmillan. The Air Ministry did not pursue the project, partly because of the American Curtiss engine used and partly because of its wooden construction and the Firefly I did not enter production.

== Specifications (Firefly I) ==
Data from The Complete Book of Fighters

General characteristics

- Crew: 1
- Length: 24 ft 10 in (7.57 m)
- Wingspan: 31 ft 6 in (9.60 m)
- Height: 9 ft 1 in (2.77 m)
- Wing area: 236.8 sq ft (22.00 m^{2})
- Gross weight: 2,724 lb (1,236 kg)
- Powerplant: 1 × Curtiss D-12 V-12 liquid-cooled piston engine, 430 hp (320 kW)
- Propellers: 2-bladed fixed-pitch propeller

Performance

- Maximum speed: 185 mph (298 km/h, 161 kn)
- Time to altitude: 5,000 ft (1,524 m) in 2 minutes 24 seconds

Armament

- Guns: 2 × 0.303 in (7.7 mm) Vickers machine guns

== See also ==
Related development

- Fairey Firefly II
