= Brixton plc =

Property company in London

- Type: Public (LSE: BXTN)
- Industry: Property
- Founded: 1924
- Fate: Acquired by SEGRO
- Headquarters: London, UK
- Key people: Lady Louise Patten, Chairman; Peter Dawson, CEO
- Revenue: £89.8 million (2008)
- Operating income: £(532.5) million (2008)
- Net income: £(767.7) million (2008)

Brixton plc was a British-based property business headquartered in London. It was a former constituent of the FTSE 250 Index. The firm was acquired by SEGRO in 2009.

== History ==
The company was founded in 1924 by Percy Mayer as Brixton Estate Limited to acquire a 6-acre (24,000 m^{2}) site at Brixton Road in London.

In 1945 the company began to build up a portfolio by acquiring properties damaged by bombing during World War II.

In 1997 the company decided to focus on industrial properties to the West of London and in 2001 the name changed to Brixton plc.

The company converted to a Real Estate Investment Trust status when REITs were introduced in the United Kingdom in January 2007.

In August 2009 Brixton was taken over by SEGRO.

== Operations ==
The company owned a portfolio of circa 25 m sq. ft. of industrial and commercial properties in the West London area. The main sites were:

- Park Royal, London
- Hatton Cross, Heathrow
- Greenford Park, Greenford

At 31 December 2008 its portfolio was valued at £1.6bn.
