= Ford Trafford Park Factory =

Assembly plant in the UK

Ford Trafford Park factory
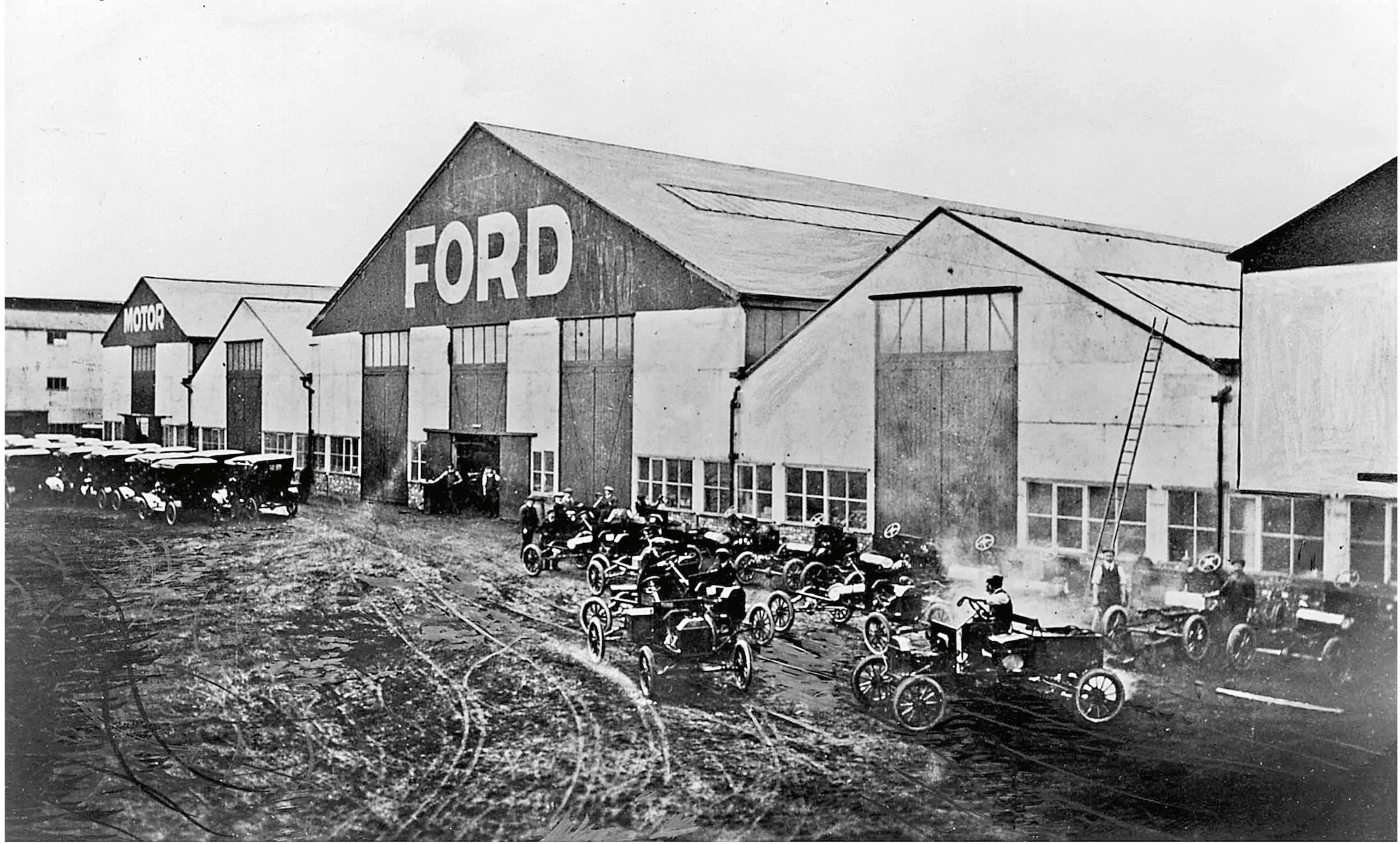
- Ford Motor Company factory in Trafford Park, Manchester, 1914
- Operated: 1911–1931
- Location: Trafford Park, Manchester, England
- Coordinates: 53.4622°N 2.3591°W
- Industry: Automotive
- Products: Ford Model T
- Owner: Ford of Britain (Ford Motor Company)

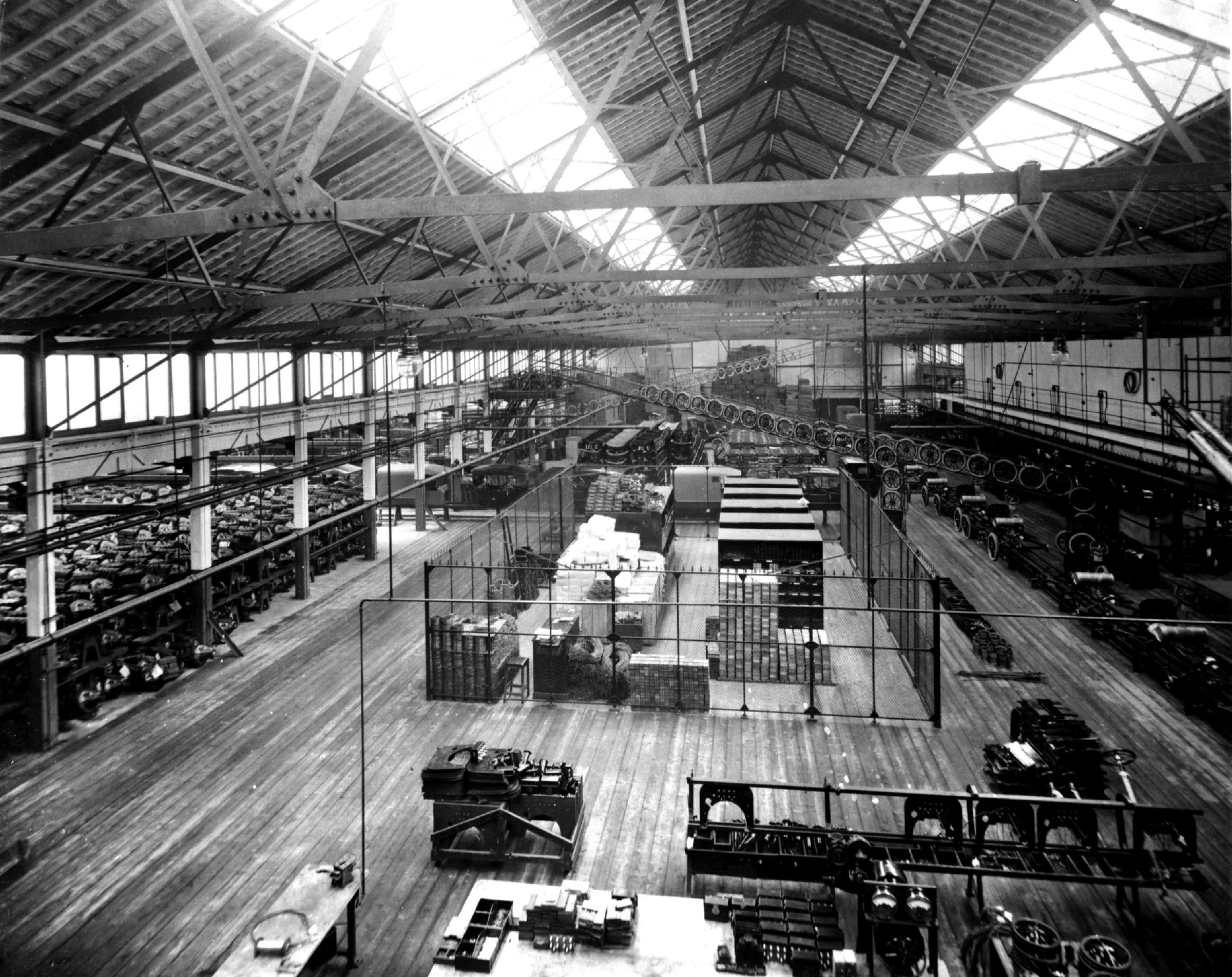
Interior of the Ford Motor Company factory in Trafford Park, Manchester, 1914

Ford Trafford Park Assembly Plant was a car assembly plant established by Ford of Britain at Trafford Park, beside the Manchester Ship Canal, a short distance to the west of Manchester. It was the first manufacturing plant established by Ford outside the United States, though originally it was established merely to assemble vehicles using parts imported from Dearborn.

== First steps in the UK ==
The first Ford model to be sold in the UK was the Model A, which was first launched in the American market in 1903. Two of the cars were imported to Britain in the same year, and since then the Ford company's British sales had grown thanks to an enthusiastic and talented entrepreneur named Percival Perry. Cars at this time were extremely expensive, and since Henry Ford insisted on payment in full before he would release cars for export from the New York City dockside, Perry's commercial energy was under constant pressure from shortage of credit. Nevertheless, by 1911 Perry was selling over 400 US built Fords per year from premises in London's prestigious Shaftesbury Avenue. It was determined that any further expansion would require more space than was available in central London, and Perry looked for a larger site, while retaining the Shaftesbury Avenue property as a showroom/office complex.

== Origins ==
A disused carriage works at the Trafford Park industrial zone near Manchester was acquired. The original plan was to assemble Ford cars using parts shipped in from the United States. The need to invest massively in high cost tooling in order to become a volume car producer had not yet come about, and the former carriage works was assembling Fords by October 1911. By now, Ford's principal model was the Model T, and this is the car that was assembled at the new plant.

== Development ==
The need to import parts from the American Midwest must have complicated the assembly process, since the Trafford Park plant quickly took to purchasing components on its own account far closer to home. For two years, bodies were delivered to the Trafford Park assembly location individually on handcarts from a firm of body builders called Scott Brothers, located down the road. Ford purchased Scott Brothers in 1912. By now, however, Ford in Michigan were beginning to bring together various manufacturing techniques initially at their Piquette Avenue Plant and, after 1910, at their Highland Park factory. By 1912, Ford had in effect invented assembly line auto-production and work went ahead to apply the new techniques at Trafford Park. The new techniques were introduced progressively, but between 1912 and 1913 output doubled from 3,000 to 6,000 cars. In 1912, the British built Model Ts were offered for £175 on the domestic market at a time when Austin, a powerful UK based competitor, were offering their smaller, slower, 10 hp model for £240; finding customers for the Manchester built Fords does not seem to have been a problem. Trafford Park was on schedule to produce 10,000 Fords in 1914 when the outbreak of the war intervened.

Understanding of mass production techniques advanced considerably between 1914 and 1918, even if the output of the cutting edge technologies was now represented by munitions. Henry Ford took a pacifist line, but it appears that the Trafford Park plant remained employed for the production of vehicles, possibly with the emphasis on agricultural tractors. When peace broke out, the Trafford Park plant was extended, and output grew rapidly. However, in 1919, following several policy disputes, Perry left the company, and Ford in Dearborn applied a more direct approach to UK manufacturing.

By the early 1920s, the view was taken that the Trafford Park factory was reaching its limits. In 1924, Henry Ford sent over a senior representative to identify and purchase a suitable site for a larger plant, and later that year a site was acquired at Dagenham, although Ford UK production continued to be concentrated at Trafford Park until the Dagenham plant became operational in 1931. By this time, Perry had been lured back, appointed chairman of the newly formed British Ford Motor Company Limited in 1928. The final car produced at Trafford Park emerged in October 1931: in the same month, the first vehicle emerged from the new Dagenham facility.

== Shadow factory: 1939–1944 ==
53.4622°N 2.3591°W

In 1936, under the shadow factory plan, the British government appointed Herbert Austin to head a new team within the Air Ministry, to assess and invest in expanding the British aircraft industry in preparation for any future war requirements. Austin was briefed to build nine new factories, and expand or develop the existing facilities at all British located car manufacturing plants, to enable them to quickly switch to aircraft production.

Trafford Park proved highly enticing for producing the Rolls-Royce Merlin engine. Located close to both major transport links, and giving easy access for the finished product to the Avro factory at Chadderton (for use in the Avro Lancaster). Redeveloped by Ford from 1938, it was designed as two separate sections to minimise the impact of bomb damage on production.

As an important industrial area, Trafford Park suffered from extensive bombing, particularly during the Manchester Blitz of December 1940. On the night of 23 December 1940, the Metropolitan-Vickers aircraft factory in Mosley Road was badly damaged, with the loss of the first 13 MV-built Avro Manchester bombers in final assembly. The redeveloped Ford Trafford Park Factory was bombed only a few days after its opening in May 1941.

However, by the end of production in 1944 with the use of the most modern production methods, the factory employed 17,316 workers, who were capable of producing 900 engines a month. As Sir Stanley Hooker stated in his autobiography:

once the great Ford factory at Manchester started production, Merlins came out like shelling peas at the rate of 400 per week. And very good engines they were too, yet never have I seen mention of this massive contribution which the British Ford company made to the build-up of our air forces.

In total, the factory manufactured well over 34,000 engines during the war period, closing at the end of March 1946.

== Bibliography ==
- Nicholls, Robert (1996), Trafford Park: The First Hundred Years, Phillimore & Co, ISBN 978-1-86077-013-5
- Rowlinson, Frank (1947), Contribution to Victory, Metropolitan-Vickers Electrical Co.
