= David Sleath =

British businessman (born 1961)

David John Rivers Sleath OBE, born 1 March 1961, is the chief executive of SEGRO plc (formerly known as Slough Estates).

He was appointed Officer of the Order of the British Empire (OBE) in the 2022 New Year Honours for services to charity and business.
