= Network-i =

Datacentre company headquartered in England

- Industry: Colocation
- Founded: 5 June 1996
- Defunct: 28 December 2017
- Fate: Acquired by Virtustream
- Headquarters: Slough, England
- Area served: EMEA and United States of America
- Key people: Sandeep Sharma, Barry Reynolds
- Products: Hosting

Network-i Ltd was a datacentre company headquartered in Slough, Berkshire, England. The company provided hosting, colocation, network and cloud based services from its datacentres located in the United Kingdom.

The company was formed in 1996 as the Internet Service Provider Consortium with a remit to provide reliable core transit facilities. The company changed its name to Network-i in 1998 when the consortium members sold a controlling majority of the shares to the management team, headed by Barry Reynolds, a former finance director at British Gas. Under his stewardship, the company established a carrier class datacentre on Slough Trading Estate and began to offer broadband services and hosting facilities. In early 2000, Reynolds ceded responsibility for running the company to Sandeep Sharma, a conferencing industry veteran.

In 2006, the company was the first datacentre operator worldwide to gain ISO 27001:2005 accreditation. Network-i opened a second datacentre in January 2009.

On 5 August 2010 Network-i was acquired by Virtustream.

Network-i ceased trading on 28 December 2017.

== Datacentres ==
Network-i operated two ISO 27001 certified carrier-neutral datacentres in the UK.
