= Fairey Firefly IIM =

British fighter aircraft of the 1930s

Firefly IIM
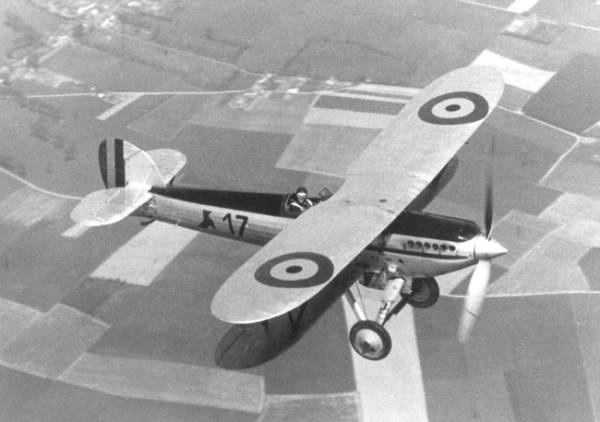
- Belgian Fairey Firefly Y-17 from 3/II/2 Aé (Red Cocottes) Squadron near its home base at Nivelles. Fairey c/n F-1505 was delivered from Fairey Hayes (UK) on 21 August 1931.

General information
- Type: Fighter
- Manufacturer: Fairey Aviation Company Limited
- Designer: Marcel Lobelle
- Primary users: Belgium USSR
- Number built: 91

History
- Introduction date: 1931
- First flight: 5 February 1929

The Fairey Firefly IIM was a British fighter of the 1930s. It was a single-seat, single-engine biplane of all-metal construction. Built by Fairey Aviation Company Limited, it served principally with the Belgian Air Force throughout the 1930s until the outbreak of World War II.

== Design and development ==
The Firefly was a private-venture design, penned by Marcel Lobelle, as the Curtiss D-12 powered Firefly I had been rejected owing to its American engine and its wooden structure, and could not be easily fitted with the larger and heavier geared Rolls-Royce Falcon XI favoured by the RAF. A completely new design, it shared little with the Firefly I beyond the name. Making use of experience gleaned from the earlier machine, it was developed in response to Specification F.20/27 for a single-seat interceptor. It first flew on 5 February 1929.

The Firefly II competed for the RAF contract against the Hawker Fury, showing superior speed but was criticised for having heavier controls. Crucially, it retained a mainly wooden structure despite the Air Ministry's demands for metal structures. This led to the Fury being selected. Afterwards, the prototype was rebuilt and renamed Firefly IIM, the "M" denoting the all-metal construction of the rebuilt machine.

A revised prototype with longer-span wings, the Firefly III was built to Specification N21/26 as a carrier-based fighter to replace the Fleet Air Arm's Fairey Flycatchers, first flying on 17 May 1929. Like the land-based fighter, it was rebuilt with more metal components as the Firefly IIIM, and again like the Firefly II, was beaten by a design produced by Hawker, in this case the Hawker Nimrod. Although no production orders ensued, the Firefly IIIM was fitted with floats and used as a trainer by the RAF's High Speed Flight preparing for the 1931 Schneider Trophy race.

== Operational history ==
A contract was won for 25 IIM aircraft for Belgium's Aviation Militaire, followed by a contract for a further 62 to be constructed by Avions Fairey, Fairey's Belgian subsidiary. The Belgian aircraft served briefly in the Second World War from May to June 1940.

Two of the Belgian aircraft were converted to Firefly IV, with 785 hp (585 kW) Hispano-Suiza 12Xbrs engines but the improvement was not deemed sufficient to warrant development. One was restored to its original form, while the other passed to Fairey for trials. One aircraft was shipped to the Soviet Union, where it was assembled and tested against the Polikarpov I-5, and found to be superior between 5,000 ft (1,500 m) feet and 12,000 ft (3,700 m).

== Operators ==
Belgium

- Belgian Air Force

United Kingdom

- Royal Air Force
  - High Speed Flight RAF

Soviet Union

- Soviet Air Force – One Firefly Mk IIM, used for tests and trials.

== Variants ==
Fairey Firefly II
Single-seat fighter prototype, powered by a 480 hp (360 kW) Rolls-Royce Kestrel piston engine. One built.
Fairey Firefly IIM
Single-seat single-engine fighter aircraft, of all-metal construction, equipped with resigned tail surfaces and revised engine cooling system.
Fairey Firefly III
Single-seat shipboard fighter prototype. One built.
Fairey Firefly IIIM
The Fairey Firefly III was rebuilt with all-metal construction and redesignated Firefly IIIM.
Fairey Firefly IV
Two Belgian Firefly IIs were converted, and fitted with the 785 hp (585 kW) Hispano-Suiza 12Xbrs engine.

== Specifications (Firefly IIM) ==
Data from The Complete Book of Fighters

General characteristics

- Crew: 1
- Length: 24 ft 8 in (7.52 m)
- Wingspan: 31 ft 6 in (9.60 m)
- Height: 9 ft 4 in (2.84 m)
- Wing area: 236.8 sq ft (22.00 m^{2})
- Empty weight: 2,387 lb (1,083 kg) equipped
- Gross weight: 3,285 lb (1,490 kg)
- Max takeoff weight: 3,404 lb (1,544 kg)
- Powerplant: 1 × Rolls-Royce F.XIS V-12 liquid-cooled piston engine, 480 hp (360 kW)
- Propellers: 2-bladed fixed-pitch propeller

Performance

- Maximum speed: 175 mph (282 km/h, 152 kn) at sea level, 223 mph (194 kn; 359 km/h) at 13,125 ft (4,000 m)
- Range: 240 mi (390 km, 210 nmi) (Firefly II)
- Service ceiling: 30,800 ft (9,400 m)
- Time to altitude: 10 minutes 55 seconds to 20,000 ft (6,000 m)

Armament

- Guns: 2 × 0.303 in (7.7 mm) Vickers machine guns

== See also ==
Related development

- Fairey Firefly I

Aircraft of comparable role, configuration, and era

- Hawker Fury

Related lists

- List of aircraft of World War II
- List of fighter aircraft
