= Segro =

British real estate company

SEGRO plc
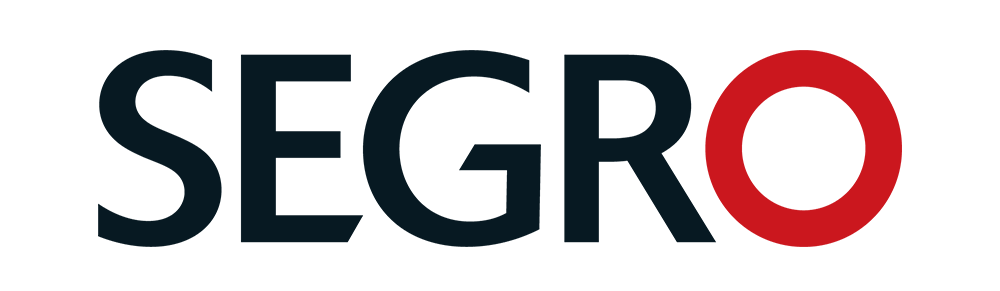
- Type: Public
- Traded as: LSE: SGRO; FTSE 100 Component
- Industry: Property
- Founded: 1920
- Founder: Percival Perry; Noel Mobbs
- Headquarters: London, England, UK
- Key people: Andy Harrison (Chairperson); David Sleath (CEO)
- Revenue: ▲£726 million (2025)
- Operating income: ▼£663 million (2025)
- Net income: ▼£551 million (2025)
- Website: www.segro.com

SEGRO plc (formerly known as Slough Estates Group) is a British property investment and development company based in London, England. It develops and invests in property located in the United Kingdom and Continental Europe focusing on areas around cities and key transport hubs. The firm switched to Real Estate Investment Trust status when REITs were introduced in the United Kingdom in January 2007. The company is listed on the London Stock Exchange and is a constituent of the FTSE 100 Index.

== History ==
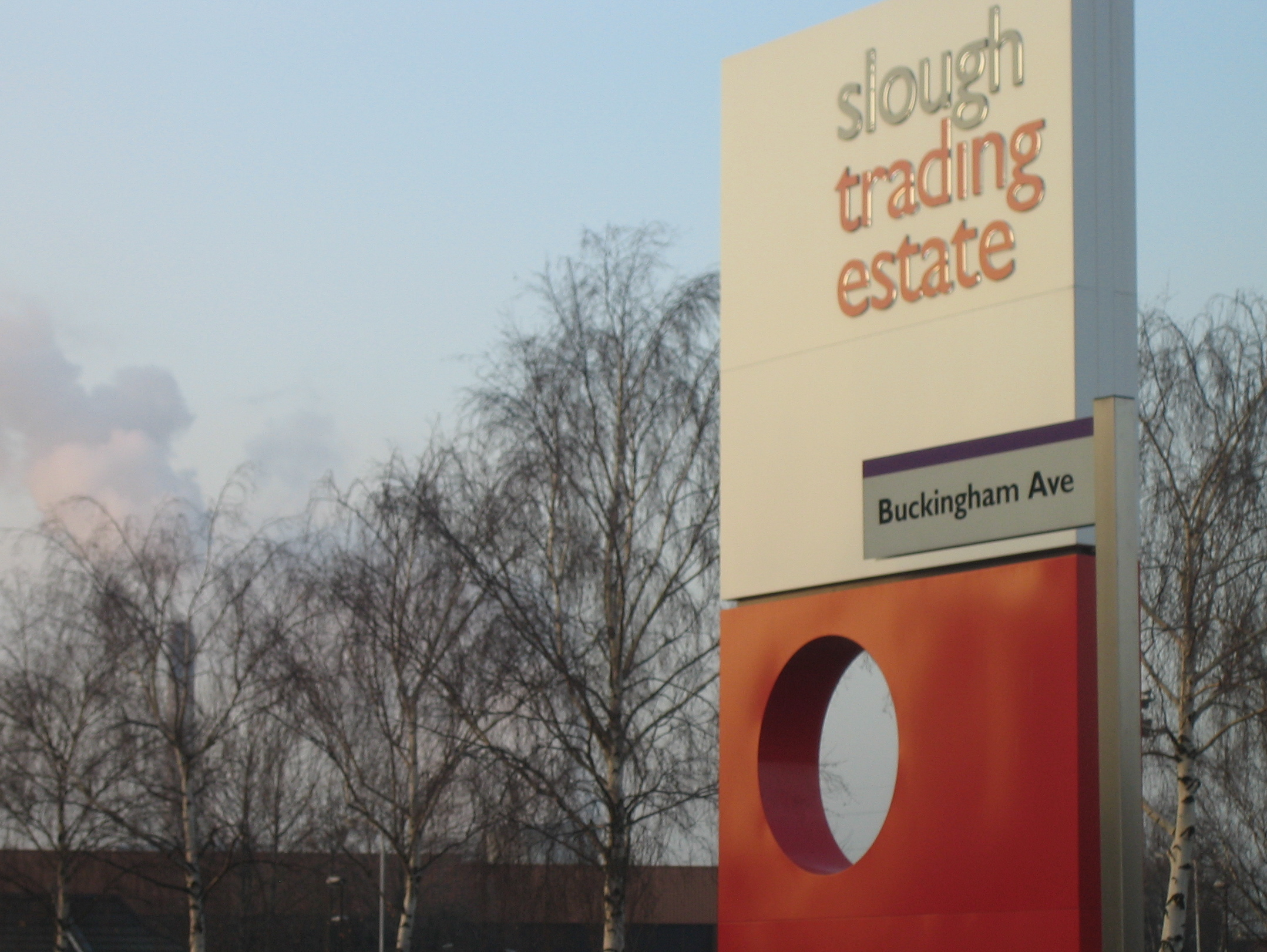
A sign at the Slough Trading Estate

The company was founded by Sir Percival Perry and Sir Noel Mobbs in 1920 as The Slough Trading Company Ltd with the objective of acquiring and developing the site now occupied by the Slough Trading Estate in Slough. In 1926 the company changed its name to Slough Estates Ltd and in 1931 it expanded north acquiring a site in Birmingham. In the 1980s it expanded rapidly buying Allnatt Properties and Guildhall Properties in 1984, Helmlace in 1985 and Bredero Properties in 1986. In 1999 it acquired Percy Bilton.

In 2004 it sold a number of retail properties to Land Securities in exchange for some industrial properties. It converted to Real estate investment trust status and changed its name from Slough Estates Group to Segro in 2007. In 2009 it acquired Brixton plc.

In July 2026, Segro rejected a third takeover proposal from American logistics-property company Prologis. The cash-and-share proposal valued Segro at £13.5 billion, or £9.93 per share; Segro's board argued that it undervalued the company's portfolio and long-term prospects. However, on July 22, Segro pivoted and stated that it would be willing to accept a £14 billion, or £10.32 a share, revised bid from Prologis; the deal that would be one of the largest foreign takeovers of a UK-listed company.

== Operations ==
Segro owns commercial and industrial properties in the UK, France, Czech Republic, Poland, Italy, the Netherlands, Spain and Germany. The company's portfolio (including joint venture assets) was valued at £16.0 billion at 31 December 2025. In Paris, Segro is developing a 75,000 square metre underground logistics centre close to the city centre for the "Last Mile" of logistics.

Sites include:

- East Midlands Gateway
- Segro Park Dagenham
- Segro Park, Perivale
- Segro Park, Rainham
- Slough Trading Estate
