= Slough Trading Estate =

Business park in Slough, England

Coordinates: 51.521°N 0.627°W

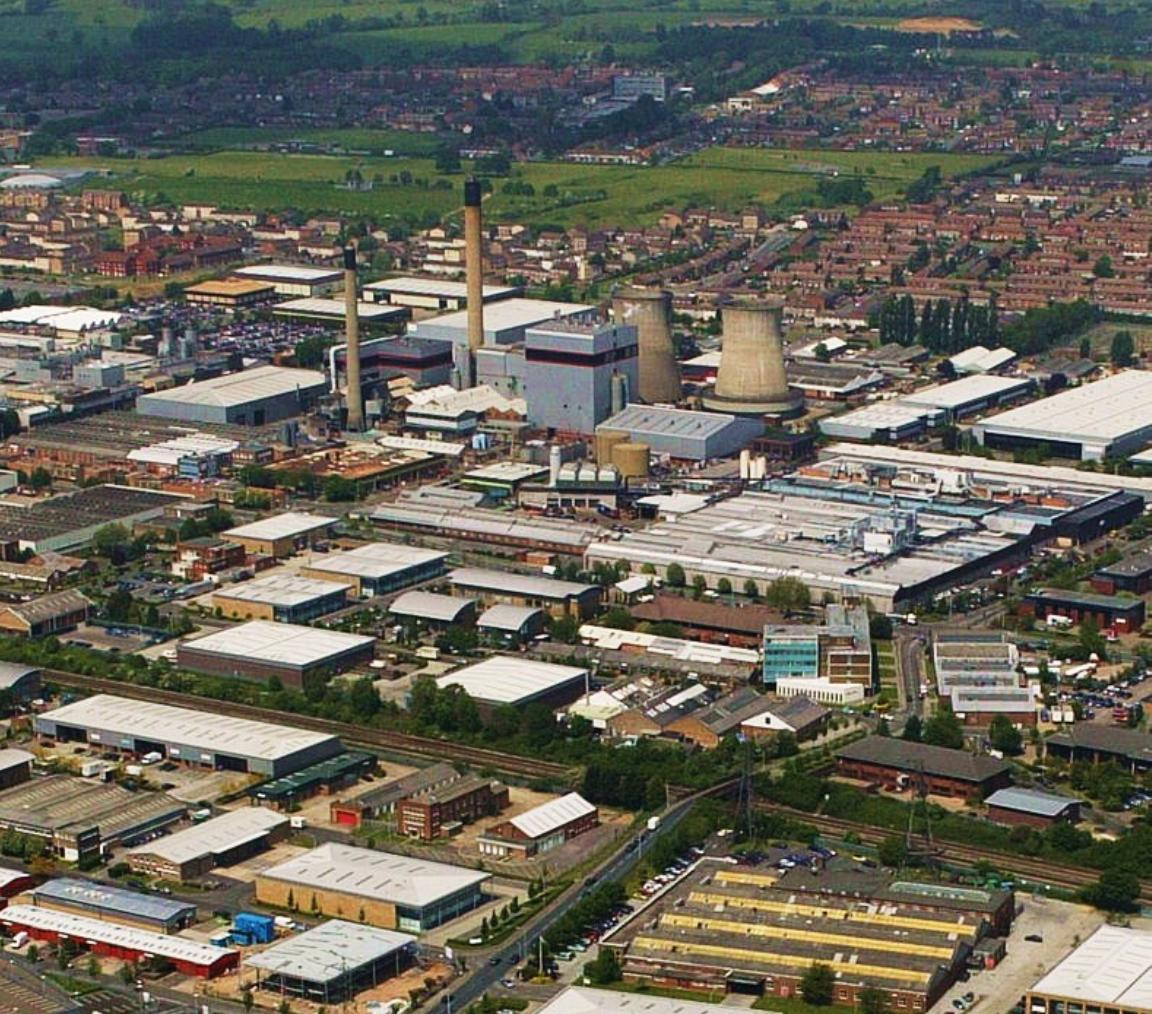
Slough Trading Estate: an aerial view looking north-west

The Slough Trading Estate, founded in Slough in Buckinghamshire in 1920, is a business park in Britain. According to the estate's owners and operators, Segro, Slough Trading Estate consists of 2 km^{2} of commercial property. It provides 0.7 km^{2} of land to 500 businesses and has a working population of about 20,000 people. Slough Trading Estate is the largest industrial estate in single private ownership in Europe.

The estate is home to over 600 buildings and 400 tenants from countries such as the US, France, Italy, Japan, Germany, and South Korea. Companies using the park include Fiat, Centrica, Hibu, Electrolux, GSK, Mars Confectionery, Akzo Nobel, Virgin Media, O2, AxFlow UK, the datacentre operator Network-i and OKI Printing Solutions. It is home to important small, medium, and large businesses. SEGRO has developed more than 30 data centres at Slough Trading Estate, making it one of Europe’s largest data centre clusters in 2026.

Electricity generated at the Slough Trading Estate power station is exported to the National Grid, while heat and utilities are supplied to commercial users on the estate rather than to local residential customers.

== History ==
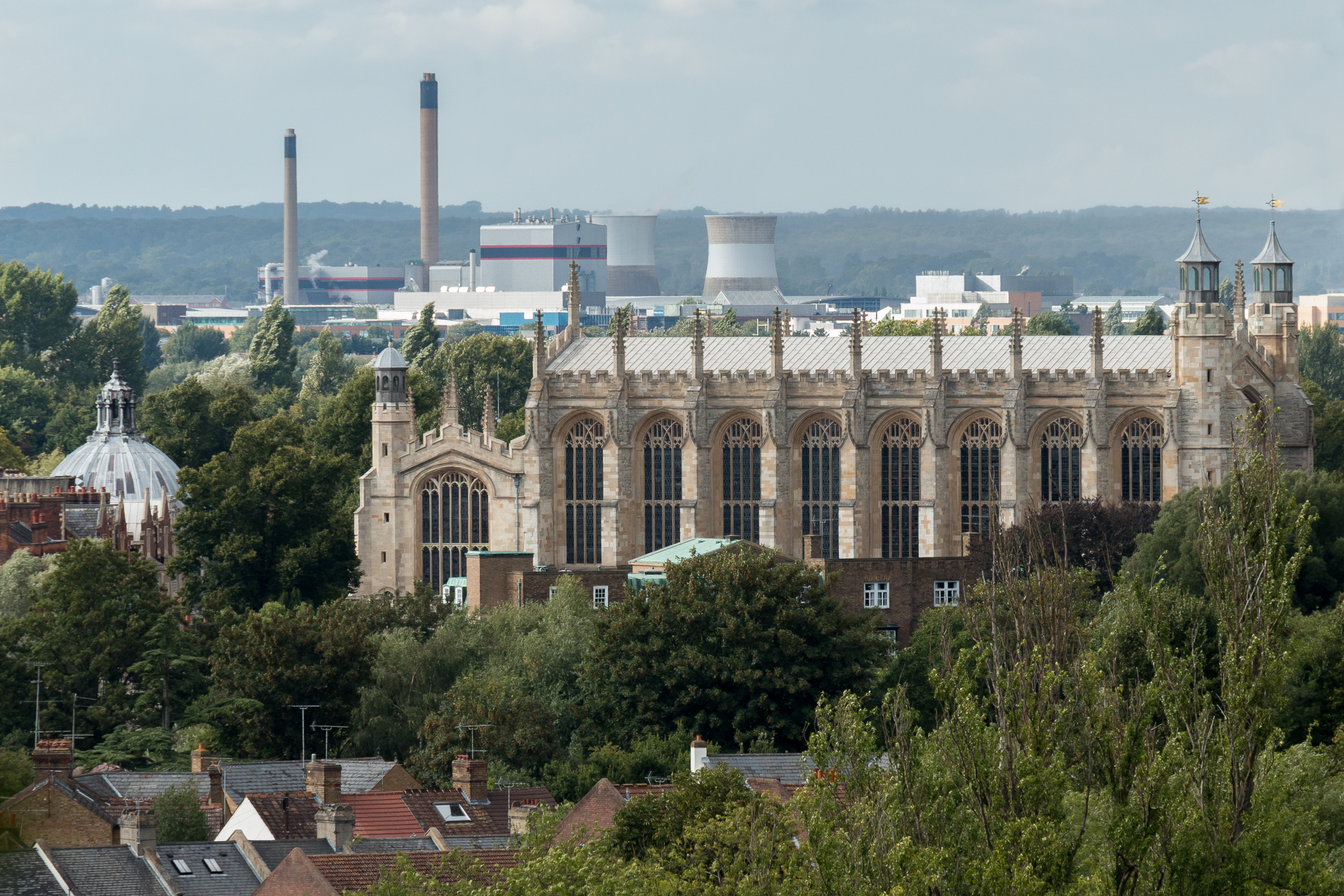
Slough Power Station as seen from Windsor Castle, with Eton College chapel in the foreground

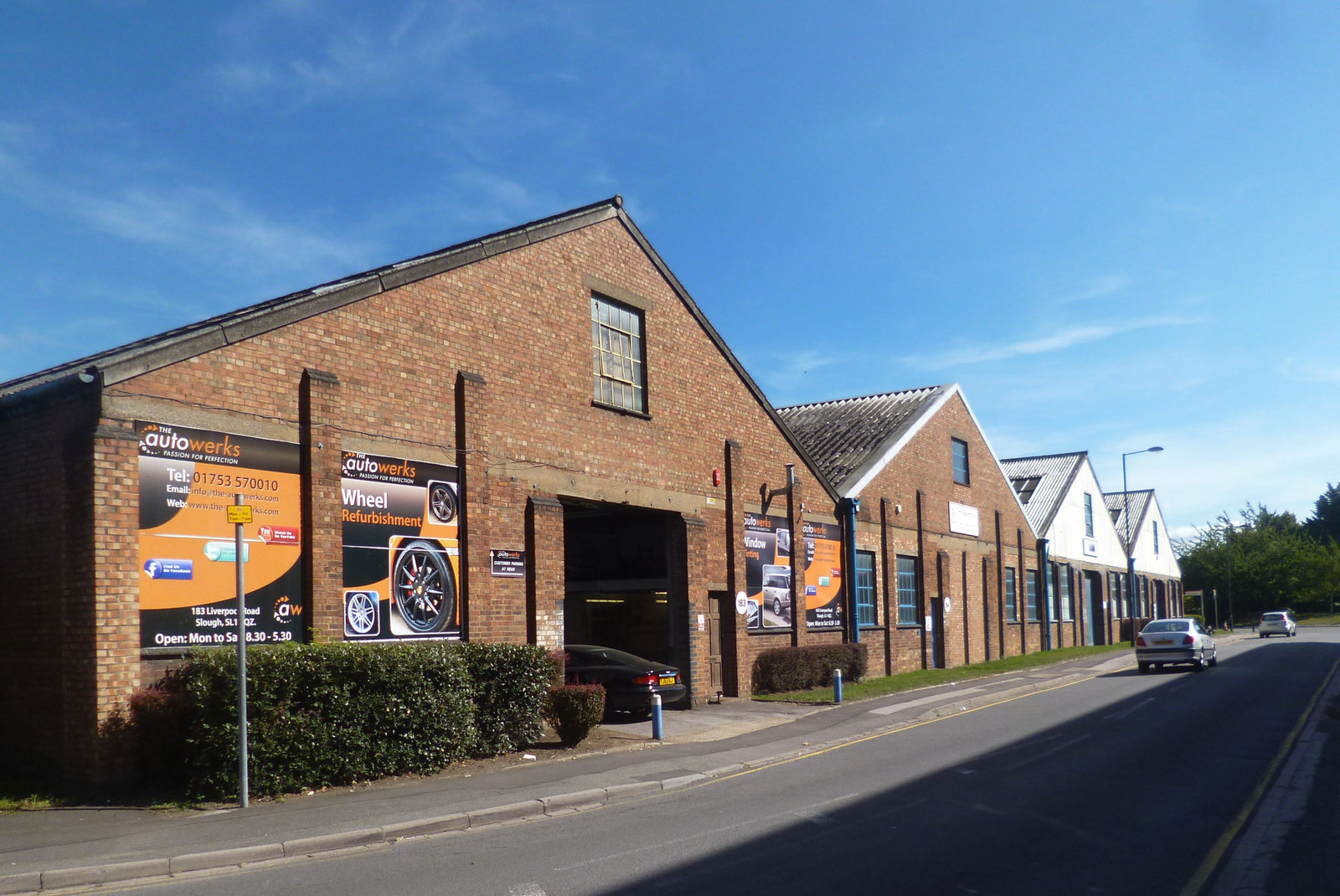
The last original buildings on Slough Trading Estate until demolition starting in 2018: these were occupied by Fairey Aviation.

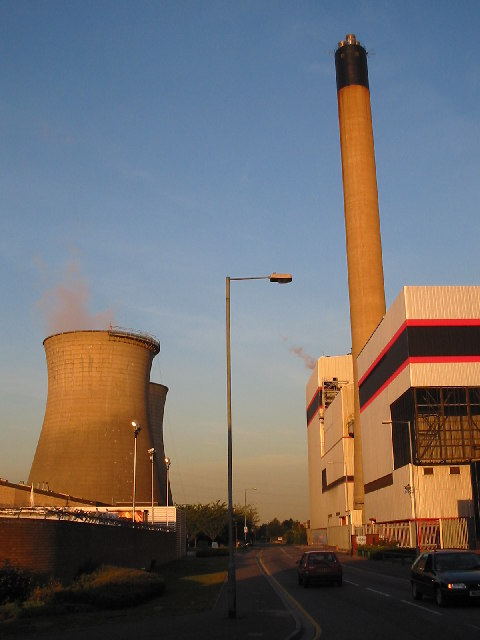
Slough Power Station, 2005

In June 1918, land to the west of Slough (now in Berkshire) and adjacent to the Great Western Railway main line, mainly forming part of Cippenham Court Farm, but also including the site of an isolation hospital, was bought by the government to form a motor repair depot for army transport. The depot was intended to receive broken down vehicles by train from the battlefront, repair them, and return them to service.

The project was not regarded as a success. The depot was believed to be so urgent that construction work, eventually by construction company Sir Robert McAlpine, began in July 1918 without harvesting the crops on the land. The site was still under construction when the armistice was agreed in November 1918.

Although the depot's fundamental purpose went with the end of the war, General Jan Smuts proposed a post-war use for the depot which was implemented. Rather than scrapping the many army surplus vehicles, they were sent to Slough for repair prior to sale. Because of this use, for many years, until at least the 1980s, the site was known locally and colloquially as 'the dump'. At the time of the depot's development, it was also known as 'The White Elephant'.

Relations between management and workforce were so poor (partly due to the militancy of Wal Hannington) that in April 1920 the entire workforce was sacked. The Government Surplus Disposal Board sold the 2.7 square kilometre (600 acre) site and its contents (17,000 used cars, trucks and motorcycles, and 170,000 square metres (1.8 million sq ft) of covered workshops) for over seven million pounds. Sir Percival Perry, who had effectively established the British operations of the Ford Motor Company and who had been appointed Assistant Controller of the UK government's Agricultural Machinery Department during the war, and Sir Noel Mobbs, led the group of investors who acquired the depot, establishing the Slough Trading Company Limited and Reduced.

Slough Trading Company Act 1925
- Act of Parliament
- Parliament of the United Kingdom
- Long title: An Act for providing for the regulation of certain roads on the Slough Trading Estate and for other purposes.
- Citation: 15 & 16 Geo. 5. c. xcv

Dates
- Royal assent: 7 August 1925

Text of statute as originally enacted

Repair and sale of ex-army vehicles continued until the Slough Trading Company Act 1925 (15 & 16 Geo. 5. c. xcv) was passed allowing the company, renamed in 1926 to Slough Estates Ltd, to establish an industrial estate. The existing army buildings were tenanted as factories, and additional units were built. Those on the Bath Road and Farnham Road frontages were designed with fundamentally uniform simple Art Deco offices on the front. Shared facilities were provided for workforce and employers, including a fire station, restaurant, shops and banks, a large community centre (1937) and the Slough Industrial Health Service (1947).

Early businesses established on the trading estate included Citroën (1926), Gillette, Johnson & Johnson and High Duty Alloys. In 1932, they were joined by Mars Ltd and Berlei (UK) Limited. In late 1933, the Slough Estates Journal reported there were 'more than 150 companies' based on the estate.

As the trading estate grew despite the depression of the 1920s and 1930s, people were attracted from all over the country to come and find work in Slough. The fast increase in population resulted in a shortage of housing. One solution was the construction of Timbertown, an estate of wooden single storey houses built adjacent to the site occupied by the Community Centre and now occupied by Herschel Grammar School.

From the outside, the houses looked like an army barracks, but inside they were spacious and comfortable – with three bedrooms, a bathroom, a big kitchen and a living room. At the start, Timbertown was well cared for a popular community, with a shop, social hut and even a Sunday school, but the buildings soon started to deteriorate. The wooden houses were never intended to be permanent. In the 1930s, Timbertown was demolished to make way for new buildings.

From the late 1950s the estate became home to Gerry Anderson's AP Films, producing a string of successful puppet series for ATV.

In 1963, Ford set up Ford Advanced Vehicles on the estate to build the Ford GT40 racing sports car with design input from Eric Broadley of Lola Cars, who subsequently fell out with Ford and used the factory (which was in his company's name) to re-establish his independent operation. Ford moved to another factory on the estate.

Until 1973, the estate had a railway directly linking the factories to Britain's railway system. A passenger service ran from Paddington and Slough stations to a separate station, accessed by a spur from the main line, separate from the freight access to the estate, until 1956.

In January 2008, the estate's power station was sold to Scottish and Southern Energy. As of 2018 the plant is being partially demolished for replacement by the Slough Multifuel facility, which will generate about 50 MW 'through burning waste-derived fuels made from various sources'.

== Geography ==
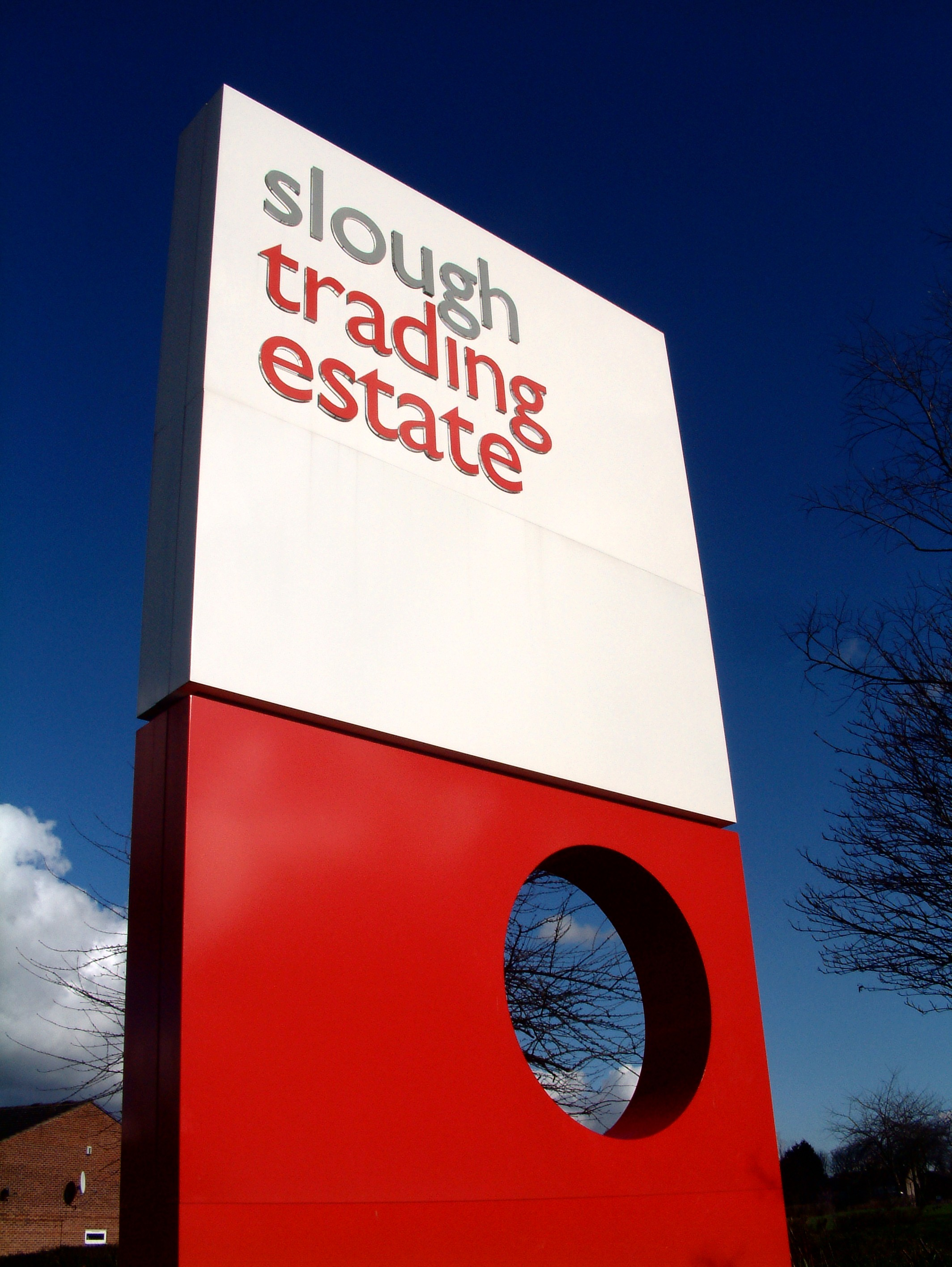
Slough Trading Estate sign

Slough Trading Estate has a Local nature reserve on the Western border of the estate called Haymill Valley.

== In popular culture ==
In 1937, English poet John Betjeman wrote his poem "Slough" in protest against the expansion of the Slough Trading Estate. The poem bemoans the loss of the area's rural character, and pillories English society's increasing consumerism and the sweatshop conditions caused by large-scale industrial development. An excerpt reads: "Come, friendly bombs and fall on Slough / It isn't fit for humans now...."

The original series of The Office is set on Slough Trading Estate. The opening sequence shows several locations in Slough and the Crossbow House building on the Trading Estate where fictional paper merchants Wernham Hogg are supposedly located, which has been replaced with a Premier Inn Hotel. It is also referenced in the song "Slough" from the 2016 film David Brent: Life on the Road.

== See also ==
- SEGRO—formerly Slough Estates Ltd/plc
- Industrial park
