= Percival Perry, 1st Baron Perry =

English motor vehicle manufacturer (1878-1956)

Portrait by Walter Stoneman, 1921

Percival Lea Dewhurst Perry, 1st Baron Perry KBE (18 March 1878 – 17 June 1956) was an English motor vehicle manufacturer who served as chairman of Ford Motor Company Limited in Britain for 20 years from its incorporation in 1928, completing almost a lifetime's work with Henry Ford. He also led the establishment of Segro.

== Background and education ==
Percival Perry was born in Bristol, the third son of Alfred Thomas Perry and Elizabeth (née Wheeler). He won a scholarship to King Edward VI's Grammar School, Birmingham which he attended 1889–1894 then joined a solicitor's office but was unable to continue law studies from lack of funds.

== Career ==
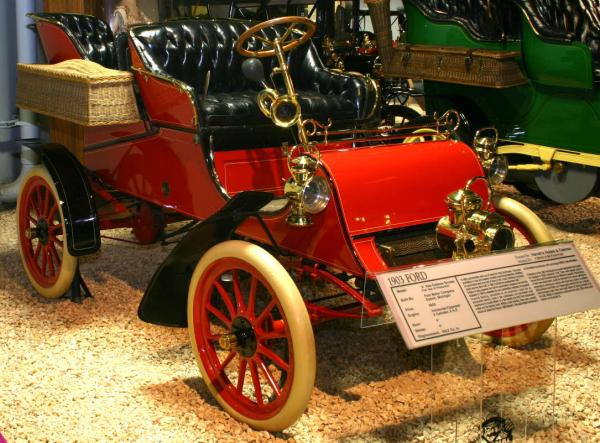
1903 Ford Model A Perry's first involvement with Ford

At 17 Perry moved to London to work in the motor industry for H J Lawson. He prepared a technical report on the earliest Ford Model A cars imported to Britain. In 1904, Aubrey Blakiston established Ford's first British agency, the Central Motor Company, in Long Acre, London. Perry joined the company as a minority shareholder in 1905, and after Blakiston's departure became managing director in 1906. Cash flow was an issue despite loans from Perry's father-in-law, since Henry Ford insisted on payment up-front when cars for export were loaded at New York harbour.

Perry travelled to Detroit to seek improved credit terms or investment in the company from Henry Ford. Although the mission was unsuccessful, good personal relationships were established with Henry Ford. Perry came up with the idea of Ford manufacturing cars outside North America to be sold across the British Empire and Europe.

=== Ford ===
By 1908, the Central Motor Company was in trouble, despite bringing in new partners and finance. Perry left the company, and briefly imported and sold REO cars. When Ford decided to pursue direct investment in Britain, he contacted Perry who in 1909 was appointed manager of a Ford branch company for Britain. Perry set up a network of exclusively Ford dealers, raced the company's cars and published comic verse promoting cars to the public.

==== Manufacture in Britain ====
In 1911 as head of the new Ford Motor Company (England) Limited he opened Ford's first factory outside North America in Trafford Park, Manchester. This operation, from 1914, included Britain's first mechanised chassis assembly system.

==== Unions ====
Perry broke trade unionism imposing job mobility, time wages and direct managerial control over production. He also followed Henry Ford's policy of paying his workers more than usual in their sector.

The 1915 McKenna import duties enforced manufacture in Britain. In 1916 Perry formed Automobiles Ford in Paris to take over Ford operations in France.

=== 1914–18 war ===
Henry Ford's pacifist leanings did not make him or his company popular in wartime Britain. Perry, by contrast, devoted his time and effort to making Ford of Britain appear patriotic and loyal. From 1916 to 1919, this experience led to his strong objection to state controls over manufacturing, Perry served without remuneration as:

- deputy controller of food production (Board of Agriculture and Fisheries) 1916
- director agricultural machinery department (Ministry of Munitions) 1917–18
- deputy controller mechanical warfare department (Ministry of Munitions) 1918–19
- director of traction mechanical warfare department (Ministry of Munitions) 1918–19

For this unpaid work he was appointed CBE in 1917 and knighted in 1918.

After the armistice Perry was determined to run all European operations himself.
Ford had supplied many vehicles to the war effort. Although successful in protecting Ford's UK position, Perry's active involvement in wartime British government did not play well with Ford's head office in Detroit. Their differences could not be reconciled and, in 1919, he was sacked.

Ford's British operations were then run by managers sent from Detroit.

=== Slough Trading Estate Limited ===
Free from involvement with Ford, Perry was available to lead the consortium which in 1920 purchased the Slough military motor transport depot and converted it into a model manufacturing estate based on Trafford Park, Slough Trading Estate. In 1922 – 1923, he persuaded André Citroen to begin building cars on the Slough Trading Estate. In 1922 he resigned as chairman and managing director though he retained his directorship and retired to live mostly on Herm in the Channel Islands where he wrote, with his wife The Island of Enchantment published in 1926.

=== Henry Ford reviews his decision ===
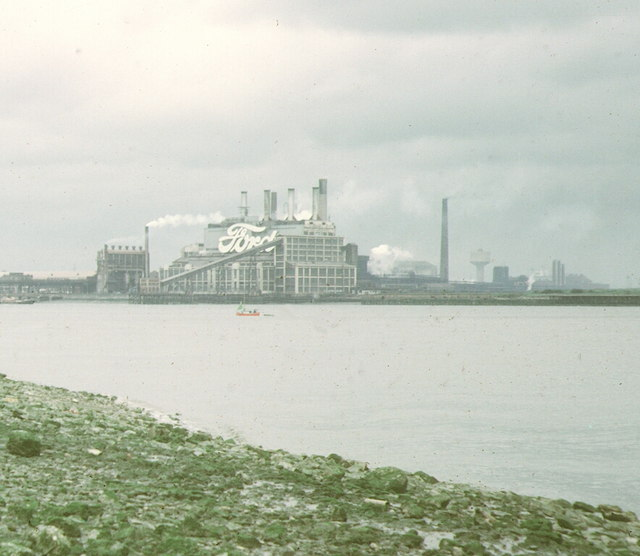
Dagenham

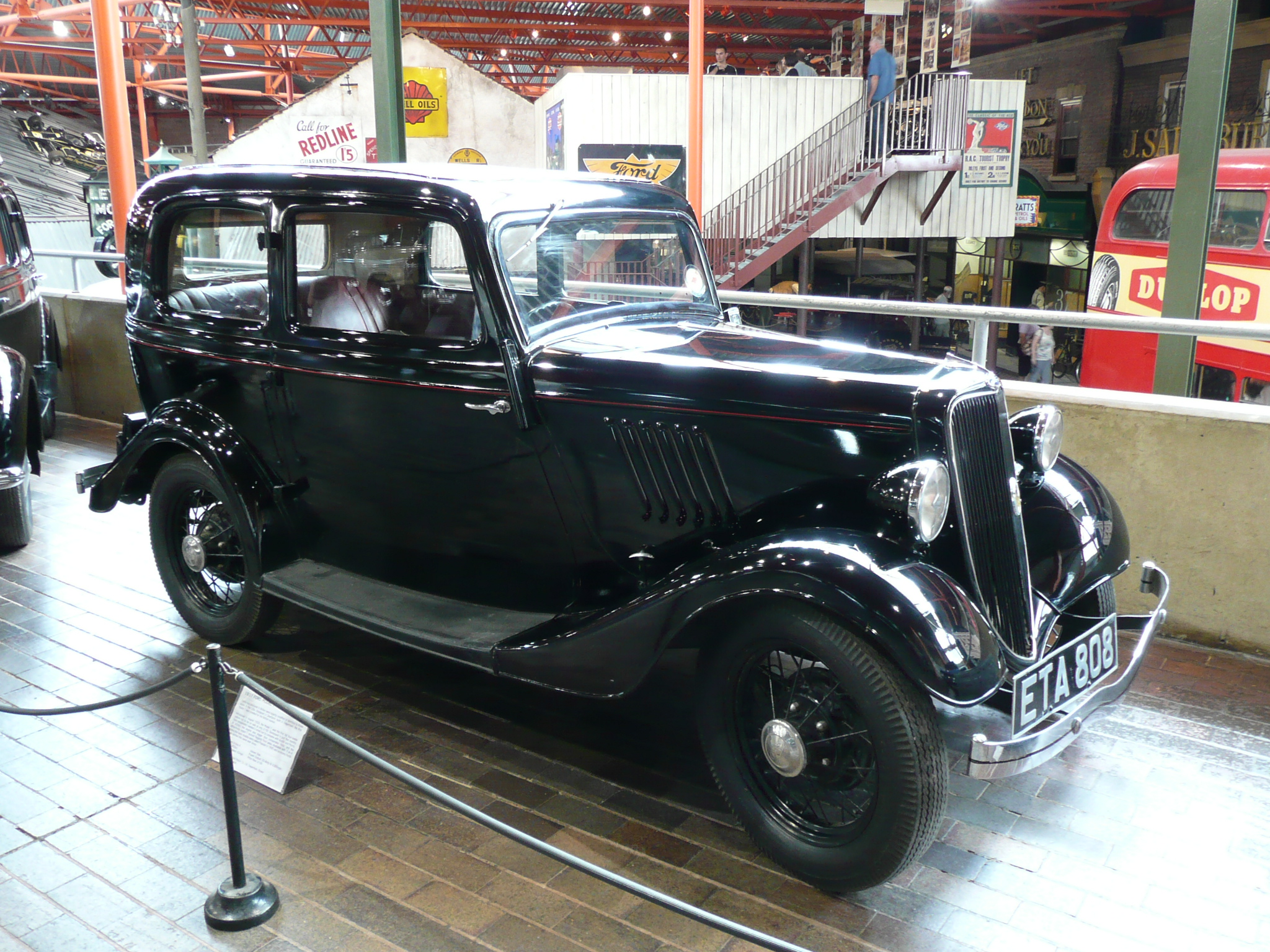
Model Y, the first Ford designed for the market outside USA

In the meantime, Ford's Detroit based management of Ford of Britain had not been successful.

In 1928, Henry Ford asked Perry to become chairman, find directors and float a new British public listed company, Ford Motor Company Limited, 60% owned by Dearborn, taking over Ford operations throughout Europe and the Middle East and developing the new plants at Dagenham—the largest automobile factory outside USA—and Cork in the Irish Free State.

Perry formulated Ford's new European strategy. Though frustrated at times by deteriorating economic and political conditions he maintained English control over all European operations superintending factories and assembly plants in Ireland, Denmark, Spain, France, the Netherlands, Belgium and Germany.

In January 1932 Ford Dagenham began production of Ford Model Y the first Ford specifically designed for markets outside North America.

== Other involvements ==
In addition to Slough Trading Perry held directorships with National Provincial Bank, The London Assurance and Firestone Tyre and Rubber Company Limited and was briefly an advisor to the Minister of Food in 1939–40.

During the depression he arranged Fordson Farms at Boreham in Essex, an experiment in co-operative farming.

Many were surprised at his liking for poetry literature and the arts. He enjoyed writing and published New Songs in 1925 and The International Balance of Trade in 1932 also pamphlets advocating '"free enterprise". He led a body formed in 1943 to promote his beliefs called Aims of Industry and was its first president.

== Retirement ==
Henry Ford passed management to his grandson in 1945 and died in 1947. In April 1948 Perry retired, aged 70, and Dearborn purchased the European operations from the British company less than two years later.

== Honours and arms ==
In February 1938 Sir Percival Perry was raised to the peerage as Baron Perry, of Stock Harvard in the County of Essex.

Coat of arms of Percival Perry, 1st Baron Perry
Crest A pied wagtail Proper. Escutcheon Or on a bend Sable between two escallops Gules three crosses patonce of the field. Supporters On either side a hippocampus Proper gorged with a collar Or charged with four pearls Proper. Motto Look Beyond Badge A pear slipped and leaved Proper enfiled with a circlet Or charged with four pearls also Proper.

== Personal life ==
Percival Perry married Catherine, daughter of John Meals, postmaster, of Hull, in 1902. They had no children. From 1923 to 1939, Perry was tenant of Herm. He died in June 1956 at New Providence Island in the Bahamas, aged 78. Lady Perry died six months later. The barony became extinct on his death.

Peerage of the United Kingdom
New creation	Baron Perry; 1938–1956	Extinct
