= Siam Shade =

Japanese rock band

- Siam Shade, c. early 2002. From left to right: Natchin, Daita, Hideki, Kazuma and Jun-ji.

Background information
- Also known as: Atæru
- Origin: Tokyo, Japan
- Genres: Hard rock; heavy metal; progressive rock
- Works: Discography
- Years active: 1991–2002, 2007, 2011, 2013, 2015–2016
- Labels: Leaf Mt.; SMEJ
- Members: Hideki; Natchin; Kazuma; Daita; Jun-ji
- Past members: Ataru; Ozz... A
- Website: siamshade.jp

Siam Shade (stylized as SIAM SHADE) was a five-piece Japanese rock band, formed in Tokyo in March 1991. The classic line-up of Hideki on vocals, Natchin on bass, Kazuma on guitar and vocals, Daita on lead guitar and Jun-ji on drums, was solidified in May 1994. Playing a form of melodic hard rock that features twin guitars and twin vocals, they released six studio albums and enjoyed a decade of relative popularity before disbanding in March 2002. The members have reunited several times since 2007 for one-off concerts and short tours.

Ryutaro Hokari of OK Music credited Siam Shade and their innate melodic sensibility for helping hard rock and heavy metal music penetrate the Japanese mainstream. Originally a visual kei band, they abandoned the image by the time of their second album in 1995, but the definition of the term broadened during the scene's boom in the mid-to-late 1990s, and they subsequently came to be considered a representative act of the "soft visual kei" subgenre. Outside Japan, the band is best known for "1/3 no Junjō na Kanjō", one of the ending theme songs of the Rurouni Kenshin anime.

== History ==
=== 1989–1995: Formation and major label debut ===
Wanting to form a band in order to compete in a high school music contest, vocalist Hideki (then known as "Chack") recruited his junior high school friend and bassist Natchin (then spelled "Natin") to join him and drummer Kurishima. Their band Power won the Summer Grand Prix Award at the 1989 Yokohama High School Hot Wave Festival. Coming in second place was a band named Fifty50/50Fifty, which featured future Siam Shade member Kazuma. Natchin's elementary and junior high school classmate Daita, who was a spectator at Hot Wave, then joined Power as a guitarist before quickly leaving. In March 1991, Hideki and Natchin formed a new band with guitarist Ataru called Atæru (アタール). In December 1992, they recruited Kazuma, then lead singer of Love Jets, as a guitarist and vocalist. Kazuma initially joined because Hideki had asked him to take over the lead vocalist position as he was leaving to form a new band with Delinquent vocalist Angela, but Hideki ended up staying. Kazuma said he then had no choice but to play guitar because Hideki could not. Drummer A (also spelled "Ei") completed the lineup and Atæru began performing.

In May 1993, the band changed their name to Siam Shade and distributed 500 copies of a four-track demo tape. Natchin said they changed the name because they had decided to stop playing casually and become serious about the band. The members went to the Karasuyama Community Center's library in Setagaya and flipped through books until one of them saw the word "SIAM". According to journalist Yusuke Kato, the Siam Shade name means "closely intertwined shadows" (密接する影, missetsu suru kage), presumably in reference to the phrase Siamese twins. The band became close with Luna Sea and their vocalist Ryuichi promoted Siam Shade by playing the demo tape on his radio show on FM NACK5's Midnight Rock City. This increased their popularity significantly. At the same time, Ataru left the band, and in July, Hideki and Natchin successfully convinced Daita to rejoin them. They later explained that it was the song "I Believe", included on the demo, that lured him back. Siam Shade held their first tour in Osaka and Nagoya in the summer of 1993, and had their first solo concert at Machida Play House on December 19. They distributed the free single "Doll" at the latter. Siam Shade contributed the song "End of Love" to the February 1994 compilation album Emergency Express 1994. The compilation also featured a song by Nerve, which featured future Siam Shade drummer Jun-ji. A was fired from the band after a three-show run at Play House in April, and replaced on drums by Jun-ji in May 1994, solidifying the group's final lineup. Hideki had been courting Jun-ji for three years, but the drummer would not agree to join because his band was fairly popular.

Siam Shade sold out all tickets to their two solo concerts at Meguro Live Station that July in just one hour, and independently released their first self-titled album on December 10. It sold 10,000 copies and reached number two on Oricon's independent albums chart. They held the 13-date Ai no Dendō Tour '95 Haru (Note: 愛の伝道Tour '95 春) between March 19 and April 27, 1995, before performing the Yamete Siam Shade Iyān 500 Yen (Note: やめてSIAM SHADE いや〜ん500円) concert at Shibuya Public Hall on August 13. Siam Shade signed to Sony Music Entertainment Japan and released the single "Rain" on October 21 as their major label debut. Kazuma said they chose Sony because they had been the first to approach them. The Fujimi no Junji Kiseki no Seikan Buffalo Attack '95 Aki (Note: 不死身のJUNJI奇跡の生還 バッファローアタック '95 秋) tour was held from October 26 to November 18. Just before their major debut, Jun-ji was riding his motorcycle at 120 km/h on the Tōmei Expressway, when he was hit by a car from behind and thrown 150 m. His speedy recovery inspired the tour's title. On November 11, they released their second album, Siam Shade II.

=== 1996–1998: Success ===
On February 1, 1996, the band released their second single, "Time's". It is a re-recording of a song from their second album and was used as a theme song of the NHK G music program Pop Jam. After a fan club-only concert at Meguro Live Station on February 15, where the opening act was Pierrot, Siam Shade held the Super Kazuma Urutora Hakase no Dai Bōken '96 Haru (Note: スーパーKAZUMA ウルトラ博士の大冒険 '96 春) tour from March 10 to April 1. Although, an additional date to the tour was performed at Hibiya Open-Air Concert Hall on May 25 under the title Forever. On September 6, the band went on the Yakkun Gohan yo. Mina Kuru Miracle Aki no o Sanpo '96 (Note: やっくんご飯よ。皆来るミラクル秋のお散歩 '96) tour, which ended with two concerts at Akasaka Blitz on October 8 and 9. The album Siam Shade III was released on October 2. It was at this time that vocalist Chack began using his real name "Hideki", reportedly due to onomancy. The album was mixed in Los Angeles by David Bianco. They closed the year out with one of their male-only concerts, titled otokogi (男樹) gigs, at Meguro Live Station on December 9, and the Siam Shade Be-Nop de Shape Up Ase Kaki Beso Kaki Rock'n Roll (Note: SIAM SHADE BE-BOPでSHAPE UP あせかき べそかき Rock'n Roll) concert at NHK Hall on December 15.

Hideki quit the band for a few days in early 1997, as he struggled to find his goal in life. He said he returned once he came to the realization that he can be happy by expressing himself through music, and perhaps make many other people happy as well. Siam Shade released the single "Why Not?" on February 21, 1997. It is a remix of a song from Siam Shade III with re-recorded vocals. March 1 saw the release of their first home video, Siam Shade, and the beginning of the lengthy Gyakushū no Siam (Note: 逆襲のシャム) tour, which ended on April 13. Two more singles followed; "Risk" on May 21, the theme song of the TV drama Koi, Shita.; and "Passion" on July 30, which marked their first collaboration with arranger Masao Akashi. On July 24, Siam Shade performed at the Rock of Ages 1997 concert, which was held at the Nippon Budokan to celebrate the 20th anniversary of the Shinjuku Loft live venue. It featured a multitude of other artists, such as Char, Kinniku Shōjo Tai, Shigeru Izumiya, The High-Lows and Spitz. They held the No, Way-Out tour from November 14 to December 7. Siam Shade burst into the mainstream in November 1997, when "1/3 no Junjō na Kanjō" was selected as the sixth ending theme of the Rurouni Kenshin anime series. The album Siam Shade IV - Zero was released on January 21, 1998. "1/3 no Junjō na Kanjō" and the album were certified platinum and gold by the RIAJ, respectively. Siam Shade's first concert of 1998 was Dokidoki Break Sengen! '98 on January 10 at Nissin Power Station, which celebrated the 12th anniversary of Be-Pass magazine and also featured La'cryma Christi. They held the Zero-ism tour between March 6 and April 5, the Metal Sex concert at Ariake Rainbow Stage on August 23, and the Wild Seven tour from September 9 to 22.

Before the year was out, the band released another studio album, Siam Shade 5, on December 2. It was preceded by three hit singles; "Glacial Love", the May 1998 theme of Count Down TV; "Dreams", the theme of Fuji TV's Professional Baseball News; and "Never End", the October and November 1998 theme of TBS' Rank Ōkoku. The album, "Glacial Love" and "Dreams", were each certified gold for selling over 200,000 copies. Siam Shade was approached about holding a concert at the Nippon Budokan that December, but they turned it down as they felt they were not ready. Natchin would later explain that the band members held the venue in such high regard, that they could not agree to perform there simply because they could sell the tickets.

=== 1999–2002: Disbandment ===
Siam Shade's lengthy Monkey Science tour began on March 26, 1999, and ended on May 26, although its finale was a concert at Yoyogi National Gymnasium on May 15 that attracted over 10,000 people. Four shows were then performed as part of the Summer Fight Series Metal Sex Again tour; two at Osaka Kōsei Nenkin Kaikan in July and two at the Tokyo International Forum in August. The band released three more hit singles that year, "Kumori Nochi Hare", "Black" and "1999". "Kumori Nochi Hare" was used as the theme song to the Fuji TV drama Oni no Sumika ~Don't Be a Cry Baby~ and earned gold certification. They also contributed a cover of "Pink Spider" to May 1999's Tribute Spirits, an album created as a tribute to Hide, who died the previous year. Siam Shade headlined the Nagoya concert of that year's Act Against AIDS events at Nagoya Congress Center on World AIDS Day. As headliners, they were able to choose the other acts, and selected Valentine D.C. and Sex Machineguns.

Siam Shade began 2000 with a New Year's Day concert at Yokohama Arena, titled Winter Fight Series Count Up 2000, and held the Kick Up the Dust tour from June 22 to July 7. They released one single that year, "Setsunasa Yori mo Tōku e" on April 19. The band performed their first international concert in South Korea at the first Busan International Rock Festival on July 16, less than a month after the country abolished its seat limit for performances of Japanese music. The double album Siam Shade VI was released ten days later on July 26. Featuring hard rock and heavy metal tracks on the first disc, and melodic pop-oriented songs on the second, it would be their last original album. The lengthy Kick Up the Dust II tour began on September 10 and ended on November 10, during which the band opened for Mötley Crüe at Tokyo Bay NK Hall on November 5. They then released the mini-album Siam Shade VII on November 29, which features re-recordings of previously released songs with new English lyrics. This allowed it to be released in South Korea, with an expanded tracklist, as it was still illegal to sell music with Japanese lyrics in the country. The mini-album was also notably released in Thailand, which was formerly known as "Siam".

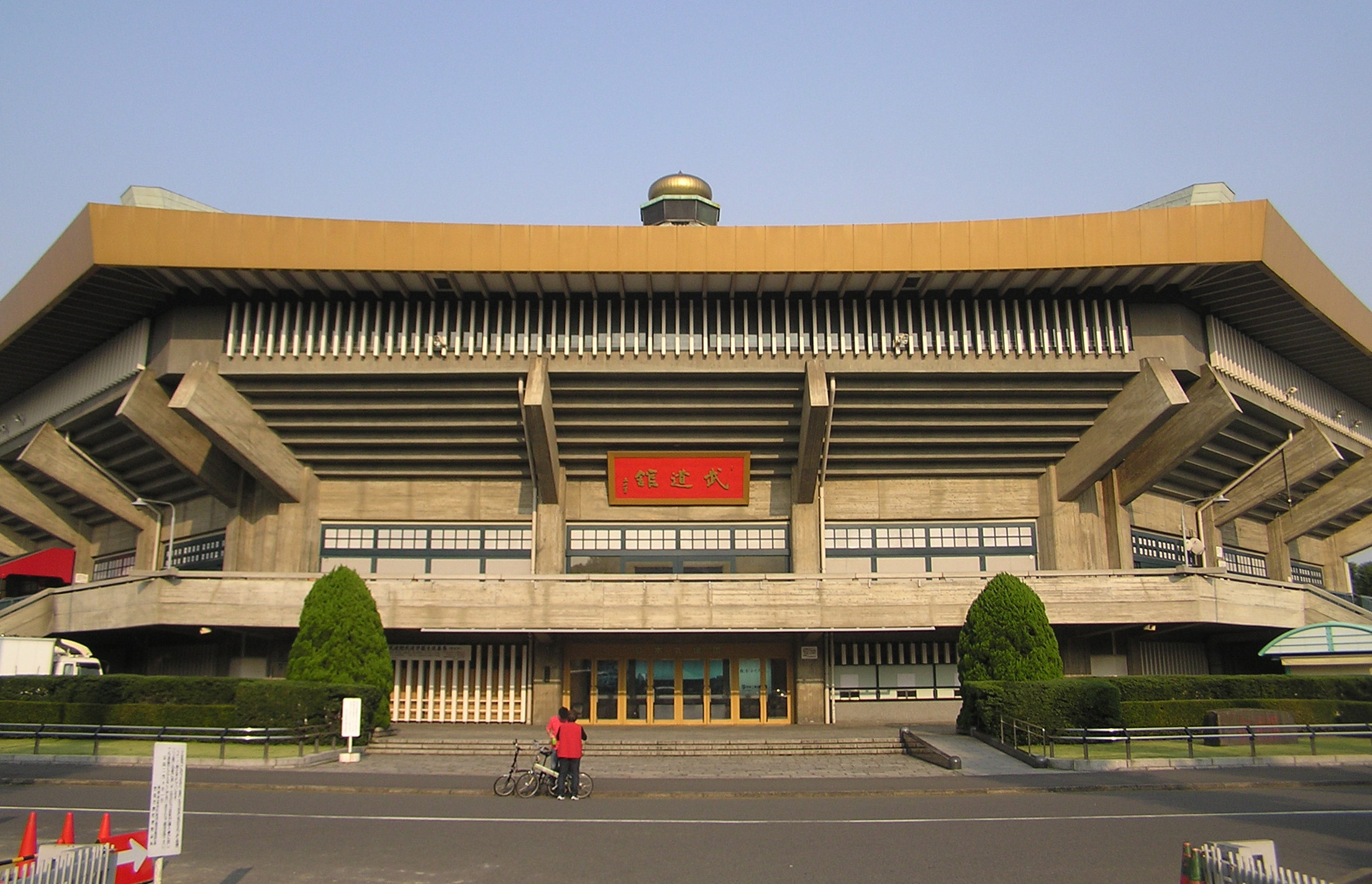
Siam Shade performed their last concert in March 2002 at the Nippon Budokan, a venue they had previously turned down playing at due to holding it in such high regard.

Siam Shade's 10-date Jumping Fight Series 2001 tour began at Zepp Tokyo on April 27, 2001, and concluded at Akasaka Blitz on May 15. The single "Life" was released before the tour on April 11, while "Adrenaline" followed on September 27. "Get Out", the B-side to "Adrenaline", was used as the theme song to New Japan Pro-Wrestling's World Pro-Wrestling broadcasts. After it was decided that the band would finally be fulfilling their dream of performing their own concert at the Nippon Budokan, Siam Shade composed the song "Love" for their fans. Similarly, Kazuma composed its B-side, "Over the Rainbow", specifically to be performed at the upcoming concert. Released on November 28 as their first single to feature a ballad, "Love" would also turn out to be their last single. The Nippon Budokan concert took place on December 28 and was titled Legend of Sanctuary. Siam Shade then closed out a New Year's Eve concert at Yokohama Arena held by their management company Amuse Inc., which also featured acts such as Dicot and Porno Graffitti. However, a week later, on January 7, 2002, the band announced that they would be disbanding with another Budokan concert in March. Two compilation albums were released; Siam Shade VIII B-Side Collection on January 30, and Siam Shade IX A-Side Collection on March 6. Siam Shade's ten-year career came to an end on March 11, 2002, with a Nippon Budokan concert titled Start & Stand Up. Later that month, they released the box set Siam Shade X ~Perfect Collection~, which compiles all of their previous major label releases.

At the time, the disbandment was said to be so each member could pursue their own path. However, in his August 2025 lawsuit against the other four members, Daita claims Hideki assaulted their manager, Shinichi Nakamura, in November 2001, fracturing his orbital bone, and their label representative ordered them to disband as a result. According to the guitarist, this was one of several physically violent incidents committed by the singer, with another resulting in the cancellation of an April 1999 concert, after Hideki sent a band member to the hospital the day prior in Kagoshima. Daita also revealed that, before the group disbanded, each member received an equal share of song royalties. But after a 2002 brawl during the production of a DVD, Hideki strongly requested the ratio be changed to one-third going to each the composer, lyricist and arranger of a song, and everyone else agreed.

=== Post-Siam Shade activities ===
After the disbandment Hideki quickly begin his solo career. In 2003, he joined the band Acid, before leaving in 2006 to focus on his solo career again. However, in 2007 he formed Detrox with KAZ (Sads) and they released a large amount of material before going on hiatus after their show on April 18, 2012. Since 2017, he holds concerts under the title Hidekidō (栄喜道), where he performs Siam Shade songs and is joined by some of the other former members.

Natin, who began going by the stage name "Natchin", has a solo career and in 2008 formed the supergroup Big Bites with Anchang of Sex Machineguns and Annie of The Yellow Monkey. In June 2014, he formed the band 21g with masked vocalist Geno, who is actually Tsuyoshi Himura of the band Everset, guitarist Mi-ya, who went on to join Lovebites, and drummer Act. Natchin formed a duo with Ju-ken in 2025, where they both play bass and sing. He has also supported Nanase Aikawa, Koji Kikkawa and T-Bolan.

Kazuma also started a solo career after Siam Shade's disbandment. In 2003, he performed a duet with Vivian Hsu, "Moment", which was used as the second opening theme to the anime Mobile Suit Gundam SEED. In 2007, he formed the band Fifty50/50Fifty, which shares the same name as his high school band. He has also provided support guitar for Anna Tsuchiya and Damijaw (solo project of Janne Da Arc member Ka-yu). In 2023, Kazuma formed the singing and dancing duo Royal Force with former Jurassic vocalist Yu+ki.

Daita started a solo career, played support guitar for Kyosuke Himuro, and wrote the soundtrack for the movie Volcano High. In 2005, he formed the band Binecks. Daita founded the G-Life guitar brand at the end of 2007. In 2012, he formed the American-based band Breaking Arrows with vocalist Nik Frost, who sang a song on the Siam Shade Tribute album.

Jun-ji has a solo career and is a support drummer for T.M. Revolution and Acid Black Cherry. In 2008, he formed the band Bull Zeichen 88 with fellow T.M. Revolution support member Ikuo (Lapis Lazuli), guitarist Sebastian (Booze) and vocalist Eijiro (Dread Nought Fuse). In 2017, Jun-ji and Kazuma, going by the names "S.N.D" and "Kz" respectively, formed the band Sengoku Jidai: The Age of Civil Wars (戦国時代－The age of civil wars－) with Yu+ki and Ju-ken.

=== 2007–2016: Reunions ===
In honor of their manager Shinichi Nakamura who died the previous April, Siam Shade held a reunion concert, titled Heart of Rock, at the Nippon Budokan on November 18, 2007. The live compilation album Siam Shade XII ~The Best Live Collection~ was released on October 27, 2010.

On April 29, 2011, Siam Shade announced on their new website, which went online the same day, that they would reunite once again for Siam Shade Spirits ~Return The Favor~. It was a free concert held on July 17 at Zepp Sendai in Sendai, "to bring hope" to the victims of the 2011 Tōhoku earthquake and tsunami. A second concert was held on October 21 at Saitama Super Arena. A DVD of the concert was released, with proceeds donated to recovery from the earthquake and tsunami. The band released Siam Shade Spirits 1993 on April 14, 2012. It is a remastered version of their first album with the addition of the new "opening" track called "Light for Closed Your Eyes" and two previously unreleased songs from their indie years.

The group released their first new song in 12 years, "Still We Go", digitally on September 18, 2013, with a limited physical release following the next month. Siam Shade performed their first nationwide tour in 12 years at the end of 2013, titled Heart of Rock 7. Initiated by the seventh anniversary of Nakamura's death earlier in the year, the tour began on October 27 at Saitama Super Arena and featured seven performances in five cities, ending on December 21 at the Nippon Budokan.

Siam Shade performed at the first night of Luna Sea's Lunatic Fest at Makuhari Messe on June 27, 2015. In celebration of the 20th anniversary since their major label debut, the group held The Abiding Belief concert at Saitama Super Arena on October 18, 2015, and The Rain Let's Up concert at Zepp Tokyo on October 21. The eight-date The Ultimate Fight Series tour continued the celebration and took place in February and March 2016 at various Zepp venues. The anniversary celebration ended with three Final Road Last Sanctuary concerts in October 2016; the Osaka International Convention Center on the tenth, the Nakano Sun Plaza Hall on the fifteenth, and the last taking place on the twentieth at the Nippon Budokan.

=== Siam Sophia and lawsuits ===
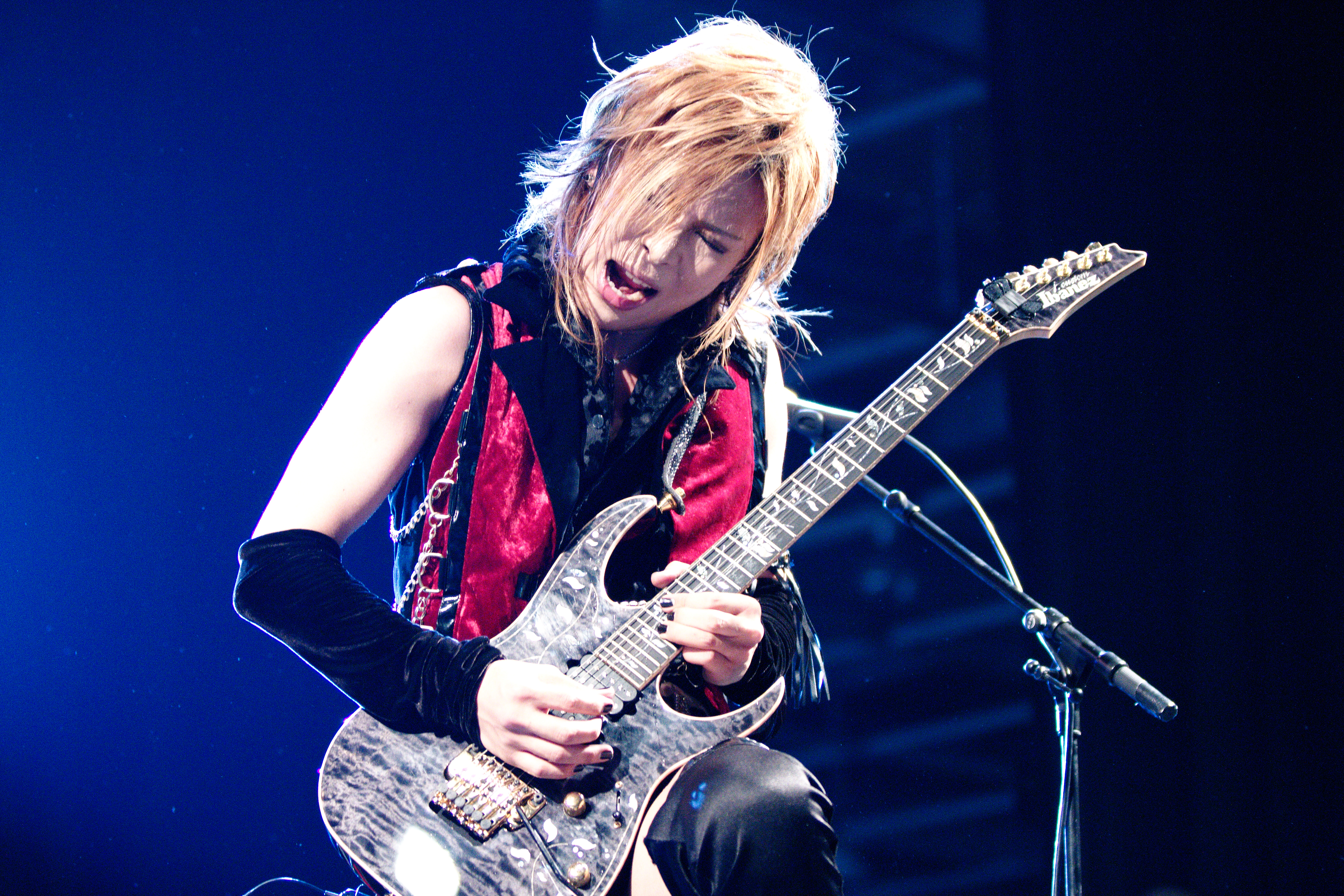
Reno provided live support for the three "Siam Sophia" concerts in 2025.

On November 4, 2024, a message was posted on Natchin's official website that revealed he, Hideki, Kazuma and Jun-ji had amicably settled a lawsuit they filed against Daita in 2019. It further stated that although all five will officially be members of Siam Shade, it would become common for the four of them to perform without Daita. Two weeks later, it was announced that they would hold a joint live with Sophia to commemorate the 30th anniversary of their debuts; both bands made their major label debuts in October 1995. It was held at Osaka-jō Hall on February 9, 2025, under the name 1995 Siam Sophia-G, with the "G" referring to Garage Sale; a comedy duo who also debuted the same year and who served as hosts of the event. The concert garnered an audience of 8,000, and saw the four-member lineup supported by Vivid guitarist Reno. On May 29, 2025, it was announced that Siam Sophia would be performing at the 2025 edition of Luna Sea's Lunatic Fest on November 8. On June 13, Siam Sophia announced they would be holding the "2025 Siam Sophia Final" concert at the newly opened Toyota Arena Tokyo on October 13.

On October 1, 2025, Daita posted a message on his official website detailing the previously mentioned lawsuit against him and a second lawsuit that was filed against a third party by the other four members, and said that he had recently filed one against the four himself. He explained that for Siam Shade's 2011 reunion concerts, it was decided that an association Daita knew would be in charge of allocating the charitable proceeds for reconstruction from the earthquake, and that Daita's personal company would be tasked with managing the profits from the shows and merchandise and distributing them to the five members equally. The former was done so with advice from a representative of the band's former agency, while the latter was decided because Daita was the only member that had a legal company that could do so. However, the other four members began to suspect the donation recipient was using the money for non-reconstructive means and that Daita's company was skimming from the profits, and filed two separate lawsuits. The former was dismissed after the court found that the proceeds had in-fact been used appropriately, and the latter was settled at the judge's direction. Daita wrote that although technically a settlement, the money ultimately distributed to the band members was what had been originally agreed upon, it was simply paid directly to them instead of going through his company.

Daita said that, because he suspected the four would try to resume Siam Shade activities as a four-piece, he obtained a commitment in the settlement terms that Siam Shade could not continue without the five members. When the first Siam Sophia concert was announced without his knowledge, Daita said he decided to wait and see how things unfolded as the event was said to be for one-night-only. However, when the second was announced, he became worried that the four would be repeatedly performing in what amounted to a de facto Siam Shade and inquired as to who owned the trademark to "Siam Shade" and learned that Hideki had applied to register the trademark in his own name on November 21, 2024, the same day the first Siam Sophia concert was announced. (Hideki's application was rejected in July 2025, as there was no proof all five members had consented.) As such, Daita filed an injunction on August 27, 2025, to prevent the other four members from performing 38 songs he composed for Siam Shade. The second and third Siam Sophia concerts took place and none of the listed songs were performed. In an interview with Barks published in October 2025, Hideki said that although he admires Daita's skills and wishes him well, he feels they hit a major turning point and does not think they will ever work together again.

== Artistry ==
=== Musical style ===
Siam Shade's music is frequently described as hard rock, and noted for the members' high technical abilities. OK Music described it as melodic hard rock with flashy twin guitar riffs, and wrote that their greatest strength lies in the interplay between "sweet vocals" and "colorful metal sounds". A signature aspect of their sound are the twin vocals between Hideki and Kazuma. Hideki said, in contrast to the other three members who like progressive rock acts, he and Kazuma like more mainstream artists, thus the "two singers feel Japanese... we don't go too dark, which I think is good." Although their music has always been based in hard rock, the progressive rock element emerged once Daita joined in July 1993. Hideki, Daita and Kazuma were the principal songwriters in the band. The member who first came up with a song idea would take the lead in its production process, but everyone gave their opinions and they refined the songs together. Hideki said that, although he naturally wanted to use English lyrics because he grew up listening to Western music, he tried to use Japanese as much as possible. In their indie days, he wrote lyrics from an androgynous point of view and emphasized atmosphere, but after signing to a major record label, he said he switched to writing them straightforwardly as a man. He also said his lyrics changed drastically after he briefly quit the band in early 1997, as he started writing songs to convey messages.

Music writer Takuya Ito noted that Siam Shade had already established their signature sound by the time of their first album in 1994. Hideki explained that as an indie band they played minor-key songs that had a dark feel to them, but for Siam Shade II (1995), the three songwriters were conscious of now being on a major record label and they ended up with a "fairly poppy hard rock" sound on the record. OK Music wrote that Siam Shade III (1996) brought aggressive guitar to the forefront of the band's music, and successfully combined 1980s "L.A. metal" and kayōkyoku-like melodies. Ito opined that while 1998's Siam Shade IV - Zero skillfully incorporates pop elements, one can not accuse the band of selling out, as it is a diverse record with catchy songs, metal tracks, as well as progressive rock, melancholic ballads, and technical instrumentals. On using Roman numerals in their album titles, Hideki said it plays to human nature in that people will feel inclined to collect them all.

=== Background and influences ===
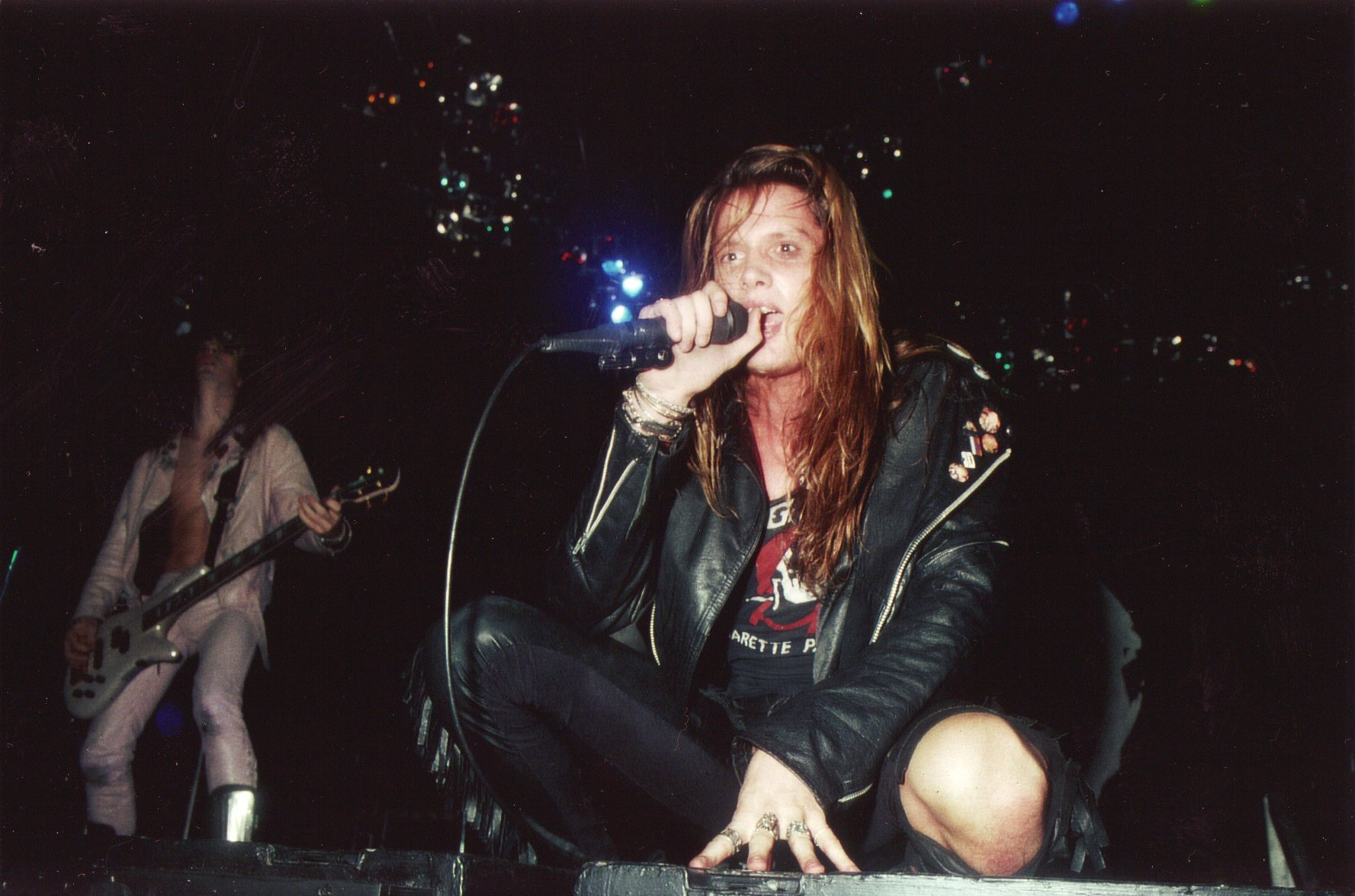
Sebastian Bach, whom Hideki has cited as an inspiration, contributed to a 2010 tribute album to Siam Shade.

Hideki played the electric organ as a child and admired Billy Joel, whom he cited as the person who had the biggest influence on his life. He began writing songs in his first year of junior high school and was the drummer in a cover band that played songs by the Beatles in his second year. He cited Laughin' Nose as his main influence for becoming a rock musician; more due to their fashion and attitude than their music. Natchin started listening to Western music in the later years of elementary school, and started playing his older brother's bass guitar in junior high school. He formed a band in his second year of junior high, which covered songs by Japanese metal bands such as Loudness and Earthshaker and Western bands like Mötley Crüe and Guns N' Roses. Natchin is particularly fond of Nikki Sixx, for both his playing and appearance, but cited J and Toshihiro Nara as the people who had the biggest influence on his life. Kazuma started playing drums in the fourth grade due to the 1983 version of Man Who Causes a Storm, before joining his junior high school's guitar club, which is also when he started listening to hard rock through Mötley Crüe and Aerosmith. He also has a background in dance, as both of his parents were professional dancers. Kazuma started writing songs in fifth grade and formed his first band in his first year of junior high. In April 1998, he said he was not attached to the guitar and would rather be a lead vocalist. Daita played piano for seven years and claimed to have perfect pitch. He cited Vow Wow as the artist that made him interested in music, and then began listening to American hard rock such as Night Ranger and Van Halen. He started playing guitar in junior high and played it so much he would end up sleeping with it, but said he only started getting serious about music after graduating high school, when he became a fan of Rush. Jun-ji discovered rock music in his second year of junior high school, got hooked on hard rock through Seikima-II, and played guitar for two years. After forming a band in high school, he switched to drums in the middle of his first year and studied by watching videos of Raiden Yuzawa. After dropping out of high school, he became a roadie for Shinya, who had a significant influence on his playing. Both Natchin and Jun-ji started listening to progressive rock due to Daita's influence.

=== Image ===
Early in their career, Siam Shade were a visual kei band that had long hair and wore makeup and black clothing. Because he had short hair and did not want to risk damaging it by teasing, Daita wore a wig when he joined. When Jun-ji completed the classic line-up in May 1994, they abandoned the heavy makeup and black clothing, with Hideki notably cutting his hair short and wearing sleeveless outfits that exposed his skin. Hideki has been open about the fact that they started wearing makeup in order to attract an audience while playing opposite such bands at live venues, and stopped once they had achieved that. In the October 1995 issue of UV magazine, Kumiko Murayama declared that Siam Shade were no longer visual kei and that their early visual kei style was a strategy to break into the mainstream. However, music journalist Showgun Fuyu wrote that following the success of "1/3 no Junjō na Kanjō" in 1997, Siam Shade began to be labeled pop rock and visual kei, demonstrating a kind of prejudice against visual kei, wherein a band that had moved away from the style, was still perceived as such. Siam Shade also had a comedic reputation, often performing humorous banter on stage and even comedy skits. When discussing this aspect in the September 1995 issue of Rock 'n' Roll HV, Hideki said they wanted to become a band remembered for both their music and the entertainment they provided. He specifically mentioned admiring the Drifters in this regard, whose guitarist Boo Takagi joined Siam Shade as a guest for a skit at their August 1995 concert at Shibuya Public Hall. However, in the November 1998 issue, Hideki said the band had decided to stop appearing on owarai television shows, and Yukinobu Hasegawa noted they had also stopped doing comedy skits at concerts.

== Legacy ==
Ryutaro Hokari of OK Music credited Siam Shade as one of the bands that helped hard rock and heavy metal music penetrate the Japanese mainstream. He wrote that by highlighting their innate melodic sensibilities, they expanded upon the groundwork laid by their predecessors such as Seikima-II and X Japan. Kato called Siam Shade III a masterpiece in the history of Japanese hard rock. Fuyu cited Siam Shade as one of the representative acts of "soft visual kei", a subgenre of visual kei that features lighter makeup, a refreshing and stylish atmosphere, and music with pop melodies. He explained that bands like them, who attempted to break away from the visual kei image, ended up creating a new subgenre, as the term, which originally lacked a clear definition, saw its definition broadened during the scene's boom of the mid-to-late 1990s. In 2004, Siam Shade was named one of the top albums from 1989 to 1998 in an issue of the music magazine Band Yarouze. In 2018, music website Barks polled visual kei musicians born in the Heisei era on which artists influenced them, and Siam Shade came in seventh place. Daita's work on their song "Triptych" was named the 83rd best guitar instrumental by Young Guitar Magazine in 2019. In 2023, Ito opined that the fact Siam Shade was able to sell-out the Saitama Super Arena for multiple reunion shows, which is larger than the venues they performed at during their initial career, is proof that their music had gained more appreciation over time.

Vivid guitarist Reno, Yuh of Vistlip, and Sid guitarist Shinji and drummer Yuya have all cited Siam Shade as one of their favorite bands. On October 27, 2010, a tribute album to Siam Shade was released, Siam Shade Tribute. It is composed entirely of Western artists such as Sebastian Bach, Richie Kotzen, Mike Vescera and George Lynch. Siam Shade's song "1/3 no Junjō na Kanjō" was covered by Nogod on the compilation Crush! -90's V-Rock Best Hit Cover Songs-, which was released on January 26, 2011, and features current visual kei bands covering songs from bands that were important to the '90s visual kei movement. "Glacial Love" was covered by Guild on its sequel, Crush! 2 -90's V-Rock Best Hit Cover Songs-, that was released on November 23, 2011.

== Members ==
Classic line-up

- Hideki "Chack" Imamura (今村栄喜, Imamura Hideki) – lead vocals (1991–2002, 2007, 2011, 2013, 2015–2016)
- Yasushi "Natin/Natchin" Nakagawa (中川泰, Nakagawa Yasushi) – bass, backing vocals (1991–2002, 2007, 2011, 2013, 2015–2016)
- Kazuma Endo (遠藤一馬, Endō Kazuma) – rhythm guitar, lead vocals (1992–2002, 2007, 2011, 2013, 2015–2016)
- Daita Ito (伊藤大太, Itō Daita) – lead guitar, backing vocals (1993–2002, 2007, 2011, 2013, 2015–2016)
- Jun-ji Sakuma (佐久間淳士, Sakuma Junji) (Note: Although pronounced the same way, his mononymous stage name is written in Japanese as 淳士, while his legal given name is written as 淳二. Additionally, he originally wrote his stage name in English as "Junji", before changing it to "Jun-ji".) – drums (1994–2002, 2007, 2011, 2013, 2015–2016)

Former members

- Ataru – guitar (1991–1993)
- Ozz... – drums
- A/Ei (Note: His name is written as "A" on the band's 1993 demo tape, but as "Ei" in B-Pass Special Edition Siam Shade Historical Book Road 1995–2002.) – drums (1992–1994)

== Discography ==
Studio albums

- Siam Shade (1994)
- Siam Shade II (1995)
- Siam Shade III (1996)
- Siam Shade IV - Zero (1998)
- Siam Shade 5 (1998)
- Siam Shade VI (2000)
