= J.J. & Jeff =

1987 video game

- North American box art
- Developer: Hudson Soft
- Publishers: JP: Hudson Soft; NA: NEC
- Director: Keigo Yasuda
- Designer: Keigo Yasuda
- Composer: Takeaki Kunimoto
- Platform: TurboGrafx-16
- Release: JP: November 30, 1987; NA: March 15, 1990
- Genre: Platform
- Mode: Single-player

J.J. & Jeff, known in Japan as Kato-chan & Ken-chan (カトちゃんケンちゃん), is a 1987 platform game developed and published by Hudson Soft for the TurboGrafx-16. The Japanese version of the game is loosely based on the popular comedy television show Fun TV with Kato-chan and Ken-chan. The game features off-beat characters and enemies, as well as toilet humor, including flatulence, urination and defecation, in the Japanese release. In 2007, the game was re-released on the Wii's Virtual Console in North America on May 28, and in Europe on June 15.

== Plot ==
J.J. and Jeff (Kato-chan and Ken-chan in the Japanese version of the game) are bungling detectives. They are out to solve a kidnapping case. The Japanese version is based mostly on the "Detective Story" segments of the show.

== Gameplay ==
The player chooses either J.J. or Jeff as the main playable character. The non-selected character will appear at various moments in the game standing by lampposts and hiding in bushes, but remains unplayable.

The player can utilize three attacks: kick, jump, or using a can of spray paint.

The game included six levels (fields) split into four parts, even though the manual says there are a total of 8 levels.

A life bar labeled "Vitality" depletes as the character is injured. Eating food hidden in each level will replenish this meter. Found money can be used to play a slot machine game for items. The slot machine is one of several hidden rooms found in each level. Kicking random objects can produce money, food, and other items. Extra lives are obtained at 70,000, 150,000, 300,000 and 500,000 points.

== Release ==
The original Japanese game has a heavy emphasis on sophomoric toilet humor, most of which was removed for the American version. For example, in the Japanese version, the spray can was originally Kato and Ken's own flatulence. Also, the unplayable character was originally defecating in the bushes and urinating on lampposts, but the urine was removed, and the character was seen wearing an animal mask in the American version.

== Reception ==
Reception

Review scores
Publication	Score
Aktueller Software Markt	10/12
Computer and Video Games	8/10
Electronic Gaming Monthly	8/10, 8/10, 7/10, 7/10
Eurogamer	1/10
GameSpot	3.5/10
IGN	4/10
Nintendo Life	3/10
VideoGames & Computer Entertainment	8/10
Game Zone	5/5
Power Play	82%

J.J. & Jeff received a 19.95/30 score in a 1993 readers' poll conducted by PC Engine Fan, ranking among PC Engine titles at the number 335 spot. The game received mixed reviews from critics.
