= Takayuki Sugō =

Japanese actor and voice actor

- 菅生 隆之
- Born: Iioka, Chiba Prefecture, Japan
- Occupations: Actor; voice actor
- Years active: 1972–present
- Agent: fukuda and.co

Takayuki Sugō (菅生 隆之, Sugō Takayuki) is a Japanese actor and voice actor.

He is known for voicing Yhwach and Zangetsu in Bleach, Senju Hashirama in Naruto, Shilliew in One Piece, Shinpachi Nagakura in Golden Kamuy, Jirochō Doromizu in Gintama, Raizen in Yu Yu Hakusho, Mihaly A. Shilage and Mister X in Ace Combat 7: Skies Unknown and Reddas in Final Fantasy XII.

== Filmography ==
=== Anime series ===
- Yu Yu Hakusho (1994), Raizen
- Lupin the 3rd: The Secret of Twilight Gemini (1996), Jean Piere
- Master Keaton (1998), Leon Papas
- Case Closed (????), Yasuyuki Murakawa
- Niea Under 7 (????), Nenji Yoshioka
- Heat Guy J (????), J
- Princess Tutu (????), The Raven
- Gad Guard (????), Drugef
- Naruto (????), First Hokage: Hashirama Senju
- Samurai Champloo (????), Kagetoki Kariya
- Burst Angel (????), Leo Jinno
- Bleach (2004), Zangetsu, Yhwach
- Monster (????), Dr. Gielen
- Hell Girl (????), Wanyūdō
- Shakugan no Shana (????), Tenmoku Ikko
- Honey & Clover (????), Tokudaiji
- Full Metal Panic! (????), Mayer Amit
- Rockman.EXE Beast (????), Kunio Kurogane
- Glass Fleet (????), Pope Goruna
- Hell Girl: Two Mirrors (????), Wanyūdō
- Buso Renkin (????), Captain
- Blood+ (????), Gray
- Yōkai Ningen Bem (????), Zojimofu
- Hero Tales (????), Sōei
- D.Gray-man (????), Devon
- Tengen Toppa Gurren Lagann (????), Narration (Elderly Simon)
- Baccano! (????), Goose Parkins
- Bokurano: Ours (????), Hasegawa
- Detective Conan (????), Tatsuhito Funamoto
- Rocket Girls (????), Isao Nasuda
- Gogol 13 (????), Duchess
- Hell Girl: Three Vessels (????), Wanyūdō
- Zettai Karen Children (????), Colonel J.D. Grisham
- Birdy the Mighty: Decode (????), Shōri Nakasugi
- Tower of Druaga: The Sword of Uruk (????), Gramps
- Bihada Ichizoku (????), SMK
- Blade of the Immortal (????), Habaki Kagimura
- Lupin the Third: Sweet Lost Night (????), Gordon
- Guin Saga (????), Urado
- Slayers Evolution-R (????), Shuryō
- Natsume's Book of Friends (????), Yōkai
- Birdy the Mighty: Decode 2 (????), Dax
- Yu-Gi-Oh! 5D's (????), Jose
- Modern Magic Made Simple (????), Carl
- Yu-Gi-Oh! 5D's (????), Old Aporia
- One Piece (????), Shiryu
- Gintama (????), Doromizu Jirochō
- Gosick (????), Marquis Albert de Blois
- Shakugan no Shana (????), Tenmoku Ikko
- Natsume's Book of Friends (????), Yōkai
- Zetman (????), Sayama
- Tari Tari (????), President
- Aesthetica of a Rogue Hero
- One Piece: Episode of Luffy - Adventure of Hand Island
- Space Battleship Yamato 2199 (????), Jūzō Okita
- Gingitsune (????), Jicchan
- Kotoura-san (????), Gantetsu Ishiyama
- Samurai Flamenco (????), Daisuke Hazama
- Naruto: Shippuden (????), First Hokage: Hashirama Senju
- Space Dandy (????), L'Delise (Ep. 18)
- Psycho-Pass 2 (????), Yohei Masuzaki (Ep. 7-9)
- Tokyo Ghoul (????), Yoshimura
- Tokyo Ghoul √A (????), Yoshimura
- Aldnoah.Zero 2, Rayregalia Vers Rayvers (Ep. 23)
- The Heroic Legend of Arslan (????), Andragoras III
- Bungo Stray Dogs (????), Herman Melville
- Hell Girl: The Fourth Twilight (????), Wanyūdo
- Miss Kobayashi's Dragon Maid (????), Tohru's father (ep. 7, 13)
- Yu-Gi-Oh! VRAINS - Dr. Kogami
- Princess Principal (????), L (eps. 1 - 7, ), Narrator (ep. 1, 3)
- Golden Kamuy (????), Nagakura Shinpachi
- Layton Mystery Tanteisha: Katori no Nazotoki File (????), Danny Bacon (ep. 9)
- Carole & Tuesday (????), Schwartz
- Vinland Saga (????), Sweyn
- The Rising of the Shield Hero – High Priest Biscas T. Balmus
- Dragon's Dogma (????), Dragon
- Getter Robo Arc (2021), Professor Saotome
- The Genius Prince's Guide to Raising a Nation Out of Debt (2022), Hagar
- Shenmue (2022), Iwao Hazuki
- Bleach: Thousand-Year Blood War (2022), Yhwach, Zangetsu
- Giant Beasts of Ars (2023), Bakura

=== Original video animation ===
- Legend of the Galactic Heroes (2000), Fang Tchewling
- SaiKano: Another Love Song (2005), Wada
- Mobile Suit Gundam Unicorn (2010), Cardeas Vist
- Shiki (2010), Iwao Maeda
- One Off (2012), Motoyoshi

=== Original net animation ===
- Spriggan (2022), Bowman

=== Anime films ===
- 3000 Leagues in Search of Mother (1999), Pietro
- Vexille (2007), Captain Borg
- Berserk: Golden Age Arc II: The Battle for Doldrey (2012), Boscone
- Uchū Senkan Yamato 2199: Hoshi-Meguru Hakobune (2014), Jūzō Okita
- The Empire of Corpses (2015), The One
- Detective Conan: The Million Dollar Pentagram (2024), Ryōe Fukushiro
- Armored Trooper VOTOMS: Die Graue Hexe (2026), Weissweiler

=== Video games ===
- Final Fantasy XII (2006), Reddas
- Tales of Zestiria (2015), Heldarf
- Nioh (2017), Tenkai
- Ace Combat 7: Skies Unknown (2019) - Mihaly A. Shilage / Mister X
- Monochrome Mobius: Rights and Wrongs Forgotten (2019), Pashpakuru

=== Television drama ===
- Taiyō ni Hoero! (1981–82) (Murakami, Miura)
- Aoi Tokugawa Sandai (2000) (Konishi Yukinaga)
- Hell Girl (2006)

=== Tokusatsu ===
- Special Rescue Exceedraft (1992) - Eiichiro Sorihashi (actor) (ep. 35)
- Zyuden Sentai Kyoryuger (2013), Hundred-Faced High Priest Chaos (eps. 1 - 7, 9 - 11, 14 - 18, 21 - 23, 25 - 30, 34 - 37, 40 - 42, 44 - 48)
  - Zyuden Sentai Kyoryuger: Gaburincho of Music (2013), Hundred-Faced High Priest Chaos
  - Zyuden Sentai Kyoryuger vs. Go-Busters: The Great Dinosaur Battle! Farewell Our Eternal Friends (2014), Hundred-Faced High Priest Chaos
  - Zyuden Sentai Kyoryuger Returns: Hundred Years After (2014), Thousand-Faced High Priest Gaos

=== Dubbing roles ===
==== Live-action ====
- Jean Reno
  - Léon: The Professional (1996 TV Asahi edition), Léon
  - Godzilla, Philippe Roaché
  - The Crimson Rivers, Pierre Niemans
  - Just Visiting, Count Thibault of Malfete
  - Wasabi (2004 TV Tokyo edition), Hubert Fiorentini
  - Rollerball (2005 TV Tokyo edition), Alexi Petrovich
  - Crimson Rivers II: Angels of the Apocalypse, Pierre Niemans
  - L'Enquête Corse, Ange Leoni
  - Empire of the Wolves, Jean-Louis Schiffer
  - The Tiger and the Snow, Fuad
  - The Da Vinci Code, Bezu Fache
  - Flyboys, Capt. Thenault
  - The Pink Panther, Gendarme Gilbert Ponton
  - 22 Bullets, Charly Matteï
  - Armored, Quinn
  - The Pink Panther 2, Gendarme Gilbert Ponton
  - Alex Cross, Giles Mercier
  - The Chef, Alexandre Vauclair
  - Jo, Joseph "Jo" St-Clair
  - The Squad, Serge Buren
  - Mes trésors, Patrick
  - The Adventurers, Detective Pierre Bissette
  - Cold Blood, Henry
- Tommy Lee Jones
  - Under Siege, William "Bill" Strannix
  - The Fugitive, Samuel Gerard
  - Heaven & Earth, Steve Butler
  - House of Cards, Jake Beerlander
  - Blown Away (1999 TV Asahi edition), Ryan Gaerity
  - Blue Sky, Hank Marshall
  - The Client (1997 TV Asahi edition), "Reverend" Roy Foltrigg
  - Batman Forever, Two-Face
  - Volcano, Mike Roark
  - Men in Black (2001 NTV edition), Kevin Brown/Agent K
  - U.S. Marshals, Samuel Gerard
  - Double Jeopardy (2003 TV Asahi edition), Travis Lehman
  - Space Cowboys (2004 NTV edition), William "Hawk" Hawkins
  - Men in Black II (2005 TV Asahi edition), Kevin Brown/Agent K
  - The Three Burials of Melquiades Estrada, Pete Perkins
  - No Country for Old Men, Ed Tom Bell
  - Hope Springs, Arnold Soames
  - Lincoln, Thaddeus Stevens
  - Mechanic: Resurrection, Max Adams
  - Criminal, Dr. Micah Franks
  - Shock and Awe, Joe Galloway
  - Ad Astra, H. Clifford McBride
  - Wander, Jimmy Cleats
- Ed Harris
  - Needful Things, Sheriff Alan J. Pangborn
  - Cleaner, Eddie Lorenzo
  - Gone Baby Gone, Detective Sergeant Remy Bressant
  - National Treasure: Book of Secrets, Mitch Wilkinson
  - The Way Back, Mr. Smith
  - Man on a Ledge, David "Dave" Englander
  - Pain & Gain, Det. Ed Du Bois, III
  - Snowpiercer, Minister Wilford
  - Cymbeline, Cymbeline
  - Run All Night, Shawn Maguire
  - Mother!, man
  - Geostorm, U.S. Secretary of State Leonard Dekkom
  - Kodachrome, Benjamin Asher Ryder
  - Top Gun: Maverick, Chester "Hammer" Cain
- Bruce Willis
  - The Sixth Sense, Malcolm Crowe
  - Hostage, Police Chief Jeff Talley
  - Motherless Brooklyn, Frank Minna
  - Survive the Game, Det. David Watson
  - Fortress, Robert Michaels
- Hugo Weaving
  - The Lord of the Rings film trilogy, Elrond
  - V for Vendetta, V
  - The Hobbit: An Unexpected Journey, Elrond
  - The Hobbit: The Battle of the Five Armies, Elrond
- Jeff Bridges
  - The Big Lebowski (Blu-Ray edition), Jeffrey "The Dude" Lebowski
  - Seventh Son, John Gregory
  - Kingsman: The Golden Circle, Champagne "Champ"
  - Bad Times at the El Royale, Father Daniel Flynn / Donald "Doc" O'Reilly
- 12 Angry Men (2003 NHK edition), Juror #11 (Edward James Olmos)
- 24, Ramon Salazar (Joaquim de Almeida)
- 88 Minutes, Dr. Jack Gramm (Al Pacino)
- The Admiral: Roaring Currents, Kurushima Michifusa (Ryu Seung-ryong)
- Aladdin, The Sultan (Navid Negahban)
- All Is True, William Shakespeare (Kenneth Branagh)
- The Amazing Spider-Man, George Stacy (Denis Leary)
- American Dreamz, President Joseph Staton (Dennis Quaid)
- And Then There Were None, General John MacArthur (Sam Neill)
- The Art of Racing in the Rain, the voice of Enzo (Kevin Costner)
- Assassin's Creed: Lineage, Rodrigo Borgia (Manuel Tadros)
- The A-Team, John "Hannibal" Smith (Liam Neeson)
- Avatar, Colonel Miles Quaritch (Stephen Lang)
- Avatar: The Way of Water, Colonel Miles Quaritch (Stephen Lang)
- Bad Company, Adrik Vas (Peter Stormare)
- Battle of the Sexes, Jack Kramer (Bill Pullman)
- Baywatch, The Mentor (David Hasselhoff)
- Below, Lieutenant Brice (Bruce Greenwood)
- Beyond Valkyrie: Dawn of the 4th Reich, General Emil F. Reinhardt (Stephen Lang)
- Black Dog, Jack Crews (Patrick Swayze)
- Black Dog (2002 NTV edition), ATF Agent McClaren (Stephen Tobolowsky)
- Black Hawk Down (2004 TV Tokyo edition), CPT Mike Steele (Jason Isaacs)
- Black Widow, Thunderbolt Ross (William Hurt)
- Blood Diamond, Colonel Coetzee (Arnold Vosloo)
- Blue Bloods, Frank Reagan (Tom Selleck)
- The Body - Jaime Peña (José Coronado)
- The Bourne Identity, Alexander Conklin (Chris Cooper)
- Boy Erased, Marshall Eamons (Russell Crowe)
- Better Call Saul, Mike Ehrmantraut (Jonathan Banks)
- Bionic Woman, Jonas Bledsoe (Miguel Ferrer)
- Captain America: Civil War, Thunderbolt Ross (William Hurt)
- Chef, Riva (Dustin Hoffman)
- Clear and Present Danger, Jack Ryan (Harrison Ford)
- Concussion, Dr. Julian Bailes (Alec Baldwin)
- The Contract, Frank Carden (Morgan Freeman)
- Criminal Minds (since season 9), David Rossi (Joe Mantegna)
- The Crow (1997 TV Tokyo edition), Sergeant Daryl Albrecht (Ernie Hudson)
- Daddy's Home 2, Kurt Mayron (Mel Gibson)
- Dae Jang Geum, Jung-jong (Im Ho)
- Dead Again, Mike Church / Roman Strauss (Kenneth Branagh)
- Death Proof, Stuntman Mike McKay (Kurt Russell)
- Deep Rising (2000 TV Asahi edition), John Finnegan (Treat Williams)
- Denial, Richard Rampton (Tom Wilkinson)
- Desperate Housewives, Karl Mayer (Richard Burgi)
- Divergent and The Divergent Series: Insurgent, Marcus Eaton (Ray Stevenson)
- Domino, Ed Moseby (Mickey Rourke)
- El Camino: A Breaking Bad Movie, Mike Ehrmantraut (Jonathan Banks)
- Elizabeth I, Earl of Leicester (Jeremy Irons)
- Elizabethtown, Phil DeVoss (Alec Baldwin)
- Escape from L.A., Pipeline (Peter Fonda)
- Evolution, General Russell Woodman (Ted Levine)
- Evolution (2005 NTV edition), Governor Lewis (Dan Aykroyd)
- The Exorcist: Director's Cut, Father Damien Karras (Jason Miller)
- F9, Buddy (Michael Rooker)
- Fargo (2002 TV Tokyo edition), Gaear Grimsrud (Peter Stormare)
- Finding Forrester, Crawford (F. Murray Abraham)
- Five Fingers, Ahmat (Laurence Fishburne)
- Flesh and Bone, Arlis Sweeney (Dennis Quaid)
- Fringe, Dr. Walter Bishop (John Noble)
- The Glass House, Terrence Glass (Stellan Skarsgård)
- The Godfather Saga, Tom Hagan (Robert Duvall)
- Gods of Egypt, Ra (Geoffrey Rush)
- The Great Escape (2000 TV Tokyo edition), Flight Lieutenant Bob Hendley (James Garner)
- Grudge Match, Billy "The Kid" McDonnen (Robert De Niro)
- Halifax: Retribution, Tom Saracen (Anthony LaPaglia)
- Hardwired, Hal (Michael Ironside)
- Harry Potter and the Deathly Hallows, Part 2, Aberforth Dumbledore (Ciarán Hinds)
- The Hateful Eight, John Ruth (Kurt Russell)
- Heat (1998 TV Asahi edition), Lieutenant Vincent Hanna (Al Pacino)
- Here and Now, Greg Boatwright (Tim Robbins)
- Home Alone 2: Lost in New York (2019 Wowow edition), Peter McCallister (John Heard)
- The Hundred-Foot Journey, Abbu "Papa" Kadam (Om Puri)
- I Love You Phillip Morris, Lindholm (Antoni Corone)
- Ignition, Jake Russo (Michael Ironside)
- The Incredible Hulk, Thunderbolt Ross (William Hurt)
- Iron Will, Harry Kingsley (Kevin Spacey)
- Joker, Thomas Wayne (Brett Cullen)
- Jurassic World Dominion, Dr. Alan Grant (Sam Neill)
- Killers, Mr. Kornfeldt (Tom Selleck)
- The Kingdom, Grant Sykes (Chris Cooper)
- L.A. Confidential, Officer Wendell "Bud" White (Russell Crowe)
- Last Action Hero (2001 TV Asahi edition), Benedict (Charles Dance)
- Leonardo, Andrea del Verrocchio (Giancarlo Giannini)
- Life of Pi, The Cook (Gérard Depardieu)
- Lions for Lambs, Professor Stephen Malley (Robert Redford)
- The Machinist, Miller (Michael Ironside)
- The Matrix Reloaded (2006 Fuji TV edition), Commander Lock (Harry Lennix)
- The Matrix Revolutions (2007 Fuji TV edition), Commander Lock (Harry Lennix)
- The Man Without a Past, M (Markku Peltola)
- Mercury Rising (2001 TV Asahi edition), Lieutenant Colonel Nicholas Kudrow (Alec Baldwin)
- Merlin, Gaius (Anthony Head)
- Midway, William "Bull" Halsey (Dennis Quaid)
- Mr. Deeds, Chuck Cedar (Peter Gallagher)
- Musa, Rambulwha (Yu Rongguang)
- No Good Deed, Tyrone Abernathy (Stellan Skarsgård)
- Nurse Betty, Charlie (Morgan Freeman)
- October Sky, John Hickam (Chris Cooper)
- Once Upon a Time in Mexico, Billy Chambers (Mickey Rourke)
- Only You, Giovanni (Joaquim de Almeida)
- The Patriot, Benjamin Martin (Mel Gibson)
- Patriot Games, Jack Ryan (Harrison Ford)
- Pearl Harbor, Captain Harold Thurman (Dan Aykroyd)
- Planet of the Apes (2005 NTV edition), Colonel Attar (Michael Clarke Duncan)
- Predator (1993 TV Asahi edition), Dillon (Carl Weathers)
- Pulp Fiction, Captain Koons (Christopher Walken)
- Sabrina, Linus Larrabee (Harrison Ford)
- Scarface (2004 DVD edition), Frank Lopez (Robert Loggia)
- The Second Best Exotic Marigold Hotel, Guy Chambers (Richard Gere)
- Selma, Lyndon B. Johnson (Tom Wilkinson)
- Shaolin Soccer, Hung (Patrick Tse)
- Sliver, Jack Landsford (Tom Berenger)
- Snow White and the Huntsman, Gort (Ray Winstone)
- Sommersby, John "Jack" Sommersby (Richard Gere)
- Speed (1998 TV Asahi edition), Lieutenant Herb 'Mac' McMahon (Joe Morton)
- Star Trek: The Motion Picture, Spock (Leonard Nimoy)
- Stealth, Captain George Cummings (Sam Shepard)
- Superman (2014 WOWOW edition), Lex Luthor (Gene Hackman)
- Superman II (2014 WOWOW edition), Lex Luthor (Gene Hackman)
- The Texas Chainsaw Massacre 2, Drayton Sawyer (Jim Siedow)
- Tin Cup, David Simms (Don Johnson)
- Transporter 3, Leonid Tomilenko (Jeroen Krabbé)
- Ultraman: The Ultimate Hero, Roger Schechter (Jeffrey Combs)
- Uncommon Valor (1987 NTV edition), Blaster (Reb Brown)
- Unfaithful (2006 TV Asahi edition), Edward Sumner (Richard Gere)
- Valkyrie, Friedrich Fromm (Tom Wilkinson)
- Wall Street: Money Never Sleeps, Bretton James (Josh Brolin)
- War Horse, Ted Narracott (Peter Mullan)
- The War with Grandpa, Ed Marino (Robert De Niro)
- White House Farm, DS Stan Jones (Mark Addy)
- The Woman in Black, Samuel Daily (Ciarán Hinds)
- Wonder Woman, Erich Ludendorff (Danny Huston)
- Your Honor, Michael Desiato (Bryan Cranston)

==== Animation ====
- Capture the Flag, Frank Goldwing
- Incredibles 2, Rick Dicker
- Madagascar 3: Europe's Most Wanted, Vitaly
- My Little Pony: Friendship Is Magic, Cranky Doodle Donkey
- Star Wars: Clone Wars, General Grievous
- Teenage Mutant Ninja Turtles, Master Splinter
- The Lego Batman Movie, Alfred Pennyworth
- The Lego Movie 2: The Second Part, Alfred Pennyworth, Dolphin Clock
- The Wild, Kazar

==== Video games ====
- Spider-Man 2, J. Jonah Jameson
