= Siam Shade discography =

- Studio albums: 6
- Live albums: 1
- Compilation albums: 7
- Singles: 18
- Video albums: 13

Siam Shade was a five-piece Japanese rock band that formed in March 1991, and enjoyed a decade of relative popularity before disbanding in March 2002. They released six studio albums, six compilation albums, one live album, eighteen singles and thirteen video albums. The members have reunited several times since 2007 for one-off concerts and short tours, and released the song "Still We Go" in 2013.

== Studio albums ==
| Title | Release date | Oricon peak | RIAJ certification |
|---|---|---|---|
| Siam Shade | December 10, 1994 | — | — |
| Siam Shade II | November 11, 1995 | 27 | — |
| Siam Shade III | October 2, 1996 | 20 | — |
| Siam Shade IV - Zero | January 21, 1998 | 3 | Gold |
| Siam Shade 5 | December 2, 1998 | 6 | Gold |
| Siam Shade VI | July 26, 2000 | 8 | — |
"—" denotes a recording that did not chart.

== Compilation albums ==
| Title | Release date | Oricon peak |
|---|---|---|
| Siam Shade VII | November 29, 2000 | 23 |
| Siam Shade VIII B-Side Collection | January 30, 2001 | 17 |
| Siam Shade IX A-Side Collection | March 6, 2002 | 20 |
| Siam Shade X ~Perfect Collection~ | November 27, 2002 | 98 |
| Siam Shade XI Complete Best ~Heart of Rock~ | September 26, 2007 | 26 |
| Siam Shade Spirits 1993 | April 14, 2012 | — |
"—" denotes a recording that did not chart.

== Live albums ==
| Title | Release date | Oricon peak |
|---|---|---|
| Siam Shade XII ~The Best Live Collection~ | October 27, 2010 | 23 |

== Tribute albums ==
| Title | Release date | Oricon peak |
|---|---|---|
| Siam Shade Tribute | October 27, 2010 | 15 |
| Siam Shade Tribute vs Original | July 11, 2011 | 253 |

== Singles ==
| Title | Release date | Oricon peak | RIAJ certification | Album |
|---|---|---|---|---|
| "Doll" | December 19, 1993 (distributed for free at first one-man live) | — | — | — |
| "Rain" | October 21, 1995 | 49 | — | Siam Shade II |
| "Time's" | February 1, 1996 | 44 | — | Siam Shade II |
| "Why Not?" | February 21, 1997 | 69 | — | Siam Shade III |
| "Risk" | May 21, 1997 | 42 | — | — |
| "Passion" | July 30, 1997 | 35 | — | Siam Shade IV - Zero |
| "1/3 no Junjō na Kanjō" (1/3の純情な感情) | November 27, 1997 | 3 | Platinum | Siam Shade IV - Zero |
| "Glacial Love" (グレイシャルLOVE) | May 13, 1998 | 10 | Gold | Siam Shade 5 |
| "Dreams" | August 5, 1998 | 4 | Gold | Siam Shade 5 |
| "Never End" | October 28, 1998 | 9 | — | Siam Shade 5 |
| "Kumori Nochi Hare" (曇りのち晴れ) | February 24, 1999 | 8 | Gold | Siam Shade VI |
| "Black" | September 15, 1999 | 5 | — | Siam Shade VI |
| "1999" | September 29, 1999 | 7 | — | Siam Shade VI |
| "Setsunasa Yori mo Tōku e" (せつなさよりも遠くへ) | April 19, 2000 | 10 | — | Siam Shade VI |
| "Life" | April 11, 2001 | 13 | — | — |
| "Adrenaline" (アドレナリン) | September 27, 2001 | 14 | — | — |
| "Love" | November 28, 2001 | 20 | — | — |
| "Still We Go" | September 18, 2013 (sold at concerts and by mail order) | — | — | — |
"—" denotes a recording that did not chart.

== Various artists compilations ==
- Emergency Express 1994 (February 1, 1994, "End of Love")
- Tribute Spirits (May 1, 1999, "Pink Spider")

== Video albums ==
- Siam Shade (VHS: March 1, 1997, DVD: December 6, 2000)
- Siam Shade V2 Clips '95 - '97 (VHS: March 1, 1998, DVD: December 6, 2000)
- Siam Shade V3 (VHS: March 20, 1999, DVD: December 16, 2000)
- Siam Shade V4 Tour 1999 Monkey Science Final Yoyogi (VHS: August 30, 1999, DVD: September 22, 1999)
- Siam Shade V5 (September 6, 2000)
- Siam Shade V6 Live Otokogi (SIAM SHADE V6 LIVE 男樹; December 31, 2000)
- Siam Shade V7 Live in Budokan Legend of Sanctuary (March 27, 2002) Oricon DVDs Ranking: No. 34
- Siam Shade V8 Start & Stand Up Live in Budokan 2002.03.10 (May 29, 2002) No. 14
- Siam Shade V9 The Perfect Clip (January 8, 2003) No. 49
- Siam Shade Spirits ~Return the Favor~ 2011.10.21 Saitama Super Arena (March 10, 2012)
- Siam Shade Heart of Rock 7 Live at Saitama Super Arena (April 1, 2014)
- Siam Shade Live Tour 2013 "Heart of Rock 7" Special Live -Inheritance of the Soul- Tamashī no Keishō (SIAM SHADE LIVE TOUR 2013 "HEART OF ROCK 7" Special Live -Inheritance of the soul- 魂の継承; March 10, 2015)
- ~Final Road Last Sanctuary~ Siam Shade Live 2016 Live at Nippon Budokan 2016.10.20 (October 21, 2018)
