= Miyuki Ichijo =

Japanese voice actress (1947–2023)

- 一城みゆ希
- Born: Hiroko Chieda; 23 August 1949; Mizusawa, Iwate, Japan
- Died: 24 October 2023 (aged 74)
- Employer: Production Baobab
- Notable work: Julie the Wild Rose as Julie Braun; Yawara! as Jody Rockwell; Case Closed as Jodie Starling; Project ARMS as Misa Takatsuki

Hiroko Okamoto (岡本 浩子, Okamoto Hiroko; née Chieda; 23 August 1949 – 24 October 2023), known professionally as Miyuki Ichijo (一城 みゆ希, Ichijō Miyuki), was a Japanese voice actress and singer.

Born in Mizusawa, Iwate, she decided to become a singer and underwent training at Shochiku Music and Dance School, and she became part of the cast of the music variety show Stage 101 in 1970. After leaving the show in 1972, she appeared on Okaasan to Issho and was inspired to go into voice acting after seeing a puppetry segment on the show. After starring in a few Japanese-language dubs of foreign media, she began voicing characters in anime, including Julie Braun in Julie the Wild Rose, Jody Rockwell in Yawara!, Jodie Starling in Case Closed, and Misa Takatsuki in Project ARMS. She was also the Japanese dub voice of Marge Simpson on The Simpsons, and made appearances on hundreds of early childhood education recordings.

== Biography ==
=== Early life ===
Miyuki Ichijo was born Hiroko Chieda on 23 August 1949. She lived in her place of birth, Mizusawa, Iwate, until her third year in elementary school. During this time, her relatives raised her while her mother went to Tokyo for her job. Ichijo and her mother moved to Tokyo during her fourth year in elementary school, and she spent her summer and winter holidays in Mizusawa. After developing rheumatism all over her body, her mother recovered enough to open a restaurant.

Ever since she could remember, Ichijo had wanted to become a singer, and she decided to become one after being happy that the adults around her praised her ability to sing nursery rhymes and adult songs. After graduating from junior high school, she entered Shochiku Music and Dance School, where she was trained in the basics of singing and dancing.

=== Career ===
In 1969, she passed the audition for Stage 101, a new music variety show scheduled to be broadcast on NHK from 1970, and she became a member of the performing group Young 101. She spent a year training with Rokusuke Ei, Toshirō Hayano, Kumi Nakagawa, Hiroko Nakajima, Hachidai Nakamura, Sanae Ōzeki, and Duke Aces member Shōji Wada.

In addition to being a member of Young 101, she performed a one-woman show on Stage 101, often made appearances in dance, talk, and comedy skits, and was in charge of next-episode previews. However, she refused to accept the March 1972 transfer of Stage 101's director Norihiko Suemori, and after she unsuccessfully appealed directly to several of her Young 101 teammates and NHK chairman Yoshinori Maeda, she resigned from Stage 101 on 24 September 1972.

Before she left Stage 101, she had been offered the role of Uta no Onee-san in Okaasan to Issho, so she appeared on the show. On the show, she met voice actors such as Yasuo Yamada, Chikao Ohtsuka, and Noriko Ohara, and she began to admire the work of voice acting. After seeing voice actors using different voices in a puppet show, she was amazed at their skills and tried to improve her vocal skills as Uta no Onee-san. However, her agency at the time focused on singing work rather than voice work and did not approve of her being affiliated with them after her marriage, so she transferred to Teatro Echo at the recommendation of an Okaasan to Issho producer.

Her debut as a voice actor was in NHK's Japanese-language dub of Man from Atlantis, an American television series which aired during the 1977–78 season. She was subsequently chosen to provide voicework for the Japanese-language television dub of the 1977 American film Oh, God!. However, due to the poor quality of her work, the dub's director, Yasumasa Date, received a scolding from a producer and told her his disappointment, which motivated her. Date later praised her goal, and she transferred to Production Baobab to pursue a voice acting career.

Ichijo's voice acting credits included Julie Braun in Julie the Wild Rose, Wakiko Obō in Obocchama-kun, Jody Rockwell in Yawara!, Jodie Starling in Case Closed, Misa Takatsuki in Project ARMS, Tsubasa Nishikiori in Mazinger Edition Z: The Impact!, Huci in Golden Kamuy, and Cardo Nabo in Mobile Suit Gundam: The Witch from Mercury. She was also the Japanese dub voice of Marge Simpson, a major character of The Simpsons. Her roles ranged from mothers to career women, but by 1997, she often played middle-aged women. In 2007, she served as a director of the Japan Actors Union. Her last voice acting credit, Detective Conan: Black Iron Submarine, was released in April 2023, six months before her death.

In 2005, she released Ichijō Miyuki ga Utau Toa-te Tsunagi Donuts, a CD from the Early Childhood Education Research Institute; for this CD, she traveled around the country every summer as a singing and hand-playing instructor. She also worked on hundreds of nationally widespread early childhood education recordings, with Wednesday Alcala of Anime Corner praising it as a "remarkable legacy".

=== Personal life ===
She spoke the Tōhoku dialect. She held the certification Nihon-buyō Kiryū Natori. Among her special skills were jazz dancing and tap dancing.

In 1961, she and her mother joined Soka Gakkai, a new religious movement, and by 2022, she was the vice president of the Soka Gakkai Women's Division and a member of the Arts Division central committee.

In 2016, she was diagnosed with breast cancer and stomach cancer, and she promptly underwent surgery. She was discharged from the hospital three weeks later and immediately returned to recording.

Ichijo died of multiple organ failure on 24 October 2023, aged 76. After her death, she received tributes from voice actors Toshio Furukawa and Kappei Yamaguchi, and Golden Kamuy director Hitoshi Nanba posted a commemorative illustration of Huci in her memory.

== Filmography ==
=== Animated television ===
1979

- Julie the Wild Rose, Julie Braun

1989

- Obocchama-kun, Wakiko Obō

1990

- Yawara!, Jody Rockwell

2001

- Case Closed, Jodie Starling
- Project ARMS, Misa Takatsuki

2009

- Mazinger Edition Z: The Impact!, Tsubasa Nishikiori

2018

- Golden Kamuy, Huci

2022

- Mobile Suit Gundam: The Witch from Mercury, Cardo Nabo
- The Devil is a Part-Timer!!, Ei Sasaki

2023

- Synduality: Noir, Pascale

=== Animated film ===
- Little Twins: Bokura no Natsu ga Tondeiku (1992), Michiru
- The House of the Lost on the Cape (2021), Yoshii

=== Video games ===
- The Bouncer (2000), Newscaster
- Tales of Rebirth (2004), Gilione
- Kingdom Hearts 3D: Dream Drop Distance (2012), Blue Fairy
- Stranger of Paradise: Final Fantasy Origin (2022), Queen Jayne

=== Dubbing ===
- Pinocchio (1940), Blue Fairy
- Peanuts franchise (1971-1987), Lucy Van Pelt
- The Simpsons, Marge Simpson
- Who Framed Roger Rabbit (1988), Jessica Rabbit
- Where on Earth is Carmen Sandiego? (1994), Carmen Sandiego
- Speed (1994), Annie Porter
- Edward Scissorhands (1994 TV edition), Joyce Monroe
- Cloud Atlas (2012), Madame Horrox / Older Ursula / Yosouf Suleiman / Abbess
