= Yawara! =

Japanese manga series

- First tankōbon volume cover, featuring Yawara Inokuma
- Genre: Coming-of-age; Romantic comedy; Sports
- Manga
- Written by: Naoki Urasawa
- Published by: Shogakukan
- Magazine: Big Comic Spirits
- Original run: 1986 – 1993
- Volumes: 29
- Anime television series

Yawara! A Fashionable Judo Girl!
- Directed by: Hiroko Tokita
- Produced by: Masao Maruyama; Michihiko Suwa; Satoshi Suzuki; Tatsuya Mukai
- Written by: Toshiki Inoue
- Music by: Hideharu Mori; AXISS
- Studio: Madhouse
- Licensed by: NA: AnimEigo (2006–2012)
- Original network: NNS (YTV, NTV)
- Original run: October 16, 1989 – September 21, 1992
- Episodes: 124
Further information
Live-action film
Directed by	Kazuo Yoshida
Produced by	Yukio Sakamoto; Hitoshi Ogura; Toshimine Kobayashi; Hiro Oda
Written by	Ikuo Sekimoto
Music by	Ken Yajima; Kaname Kato
Studio	Toho Doga; Mycal Group
Released	April 15, 1989
Runtime	97 Minutes
Anime film
Yawara! Soreyuke Koshinuke Kizzu!!
Directed by	Hiroko Tokita
Produced by	Masao Maruyama; Michihiko Suwa; Tatsuya Mukai; Shigeaki Komatsu
Written by	Toshiki Inoue
Music by	Masahide Sakuma
Studio	Madhouse
Released	August 1, 1992
Runtime	61 minutes
Video game
Developer	Sofix
Publisher	Sofix
Platform	PC Engine CD-ROM, Super CD-ROM²
Released	October 1, 1992
Video game
Yawara! 2
Developer	Sofix
Publisher	Sofix
Platform	Super CD-ROM²
Released	September 23, 1994
Anime television film
Yawara! Special: Zutto Kimi no Koto ga
Directed by	Morio Asaka
Produced by	Masao Maruyama; Michihiko Suwa; Toshio Nakatani; Shōji Muronaga
Written by	Toshiki Inoue
Music by	Hideharu Mori
Studio	Madhouse
Original network	Nippon TV
Released	July 19, 1996
Runtime	92 minutes
- icon

Yawara! (also stylized as YAWARA!) (Note: Yawara (柔(ら)) is an old Japanese word for judo.) is a Japanese manga series written and illustrated by Naoki Urasawa. It was serialized in Big Comic Spirits from 1986 to 1993, with its chapters collected into 29 tankōbon volumes by publisher Shōgakukan. The story centers around Yawara Inokuma, a seemingly ordinary high school girl, but her grandfather, a living judo legend, has been secretly training her since she was a child so that she can win the gold medal at the Olympic Games. But Yawara has only one desire, to have a normal life.

A live-action film adaptation directed by Kazuo Yoshida and starring Yui Asaka was released by Toho in April 1989. That same year, Kitty Films and Madhouse began an anime adaptation titled Yawara! A Fashionable Judo Girl!. It was broadcast on Yomiuri TV from October 1989 through September 1992, for 124 episodes. Each episode ended with a countdown of days remaining to the start of the Barcelona Olympics. Two animated films were released in August 1992 and July 1996. AnimEigo released the first 40 episodes of the anime in North America in 2008, but were unable to license the remaining episodes.

In 1990, the manga won the 35th Shogakukan Manga Award for the general category. Yawara! has over 30 million copies in circulation, making it one of the best-selling manga series of all time.

== Plot ==
Yawara Inokuma is a young girl who aspires to an ordinary life but due to her innate talent is forced to practice judo by her authoritarian grandfather, Jigorou Inokuma, with the aim of achieving the championship in Japan and the gold medal at the 1992 Summer Olympics in Barcelona. Because of the pressure from her grandfather she generally has a bad attitude about judo, avoiding it as much as she can. However, over time she comes to understand why her grandfather loves judo and appreciates it more.

== Characters ==
Yawara Inokuma (猪熊 柔, Inokuma Yawara)
Voiced by: Yūko Minaguchi
Played by: Yui Asaka
Yawara is a girl who aspires to an ordinary life but who is forced to practice judo by her grandfather. She is always having romantic daydreams; her biggest dream being to find a boyfriend. (Inokuma means "Boar Bear"; Yawara is the same kanji as "ju" in "judo", though it also means flex, soft, gentle.) Although she has a lot supporters and very close friends such as Fujiko, sometimes she acts selfishly and does not appreciate their commitment toward her (e.g., almost failing to help Fujiko in her All-Japan Selection match). Her surname is a reference to successful judoka Isao Inokuma.
Jigoro Inokuma (猪熊 滋悟郎, Inokuma Jigorou)
Voiced by: Ichirō Nagai
Played by: Keiju Kobayashi
Jigoro is a seventh-dan Judo Master (though he often inflates this to eighth- or even ninth-dan) and five-time national champion. His passion for judo is rivaled only by his love for Yawara and food (particularly sweets). He has great expectations for Yawara's judo career and is constantly pushing her to do her best and focus primarily on judo. His motto is "Judo was not built in a day." He does work on the side as a bone-setting doctor. He is a bit of a media hound as he often tries to hijack publicity events for Yawara to highlight his own life and achievements. He is often overbearing toward Yawara and is not above using mean tricks to get his way, either to thwart her goals and desires or to force her to do what he wants. He is a parody of Jigoro Kano, the founder of judo.
Tamao Inokuma (猪熊 玉緒)
Tamao is Yawara's mother. She is rarely home as she searches all over Japan for her husband Kojiro. Unlike Jigoro, she does not pressure Yawara to do judo, but she does not detest judo either because it was through judo that she met Kojiro. She tells Yawara that there are other ways to be strong other than judo and that it is possible to be a judoka and be feminine as well.
Kojiro Inokuma (猪熊 虎滋郎)
Played by: Bunta Sugawara
Kojiro is Yawara's father. He disappeared soon after winning the 1974 Japan Judo Championship in his debut as an unknown judoka, supposedly training in secrecy in extreme environments (for 11 years at the beginning of the story) without letting his family know his whereabouts.
Sayaka Honami (本阿弥 さやか, Honami Sayaka)
Voiced by: Yoshino Takamori
Played by: Yorie Yamashita
Sayaka is an extremely spoiled daughter of one of Japan's richest families. She has never failed to dominate any sport she has cared to try. When Yawara shows her up, she decides to stop at nothing to defeat her and becomes her rival. She has a false tooth, which is a sore point for her, and one that Yawara keeps accidentally bringing up. She becomes Yawara's rival not only in judo but also for Shinnosuke's affection. Honami is pronounced like hon ami, not ho na mi.
Shinnosuke Kazamatsuri (風祭 進之介, Kazamatsuri Shinnosuke)
Voiced by: Akira Kamiya
Played by: Riki Takeuchi
Shinnosuke is one of the finest judo coaches in all of Japan; he idolizes Jigorou and has been hired by Honami. Despite suffering from stage fright, he is an unbelievable babe-magnet and incorrigible womanizer thanks to his good looks and ability to flatter women with ease and superficial caring. Shinnosuke is pronounced like shin no suke.
Kosaku Matsuda (松田 耕作, Matsuda Kosaku)
Voiced by: Toshihiko Seki
Played by: Hiroshi Abe
A reporter working for a sports paper (Daily Every Sport), Matsuda becomes convinced Yawara is going to be the next great sports superstar in Japan. He is conflicted by his feelings for Yawara and his goal of making her into a judo superstar.
Kamoda (鴨田, Kamoda)
Voiced by: Chafurin
Played by: Kōji Nakamoto
A cameraman working for a sports paper, Kamoda seems to have a knack for taking "the perfect shot" for headlines. He never refuses any offer of food.
Kaoru Hanazono (花園 薫, Hanazono Kaoru)
Voiced by: Masashi Sugawara
Hanazono, the large, overly emotional captain of the judo club at Yawara's high school, becomes devoted to Yawara when she comes to his attention as a skilled judoka. He has a crush on Yawara and tries to be her chief protector, until he meets Fujiko and the two bond over their mutual enthusiasm for Yawara. He is later trained by Jigoro and becomes his college's strongest judo player.
Yuki Tohdoh
Yuki is a heavyweight judoka who lost to Yawara in the latter's "unofficial" debut, though Yawara was trying to lose the match. She outweighs Yawara by 20 kg (44 lbs) and looks, talks, and eats like a sumo wrestler.
Jody Rockwell (ジョディ・ロックウェル, Jodi Rokkuweru)
Voiced by: Miyuki Ichijo
Jody is the previous year's heavyweight judo world champion (>72 kg division); she is a Canadian who comes to challenge Yawara to a match part way into the series, becoming a friendly rival and regular character.
Kim Yonsky
Kim is the South Korean "secret weapon" whose judo incorporates Korean close-in wrestling. She and Sayaka have a judo match in which they come to an exhausting draw and pronounce mutual hatred.
Anna Teleshikova
Teleshikova is Soviet/Russian judo star who looks like a platinum robot with a butch haircut. She kicks Jody Rockwell in their first match and severely injures Jody's leg. Her habit is to study tapes intensively to figure out her opponent's weak point, which she attacks relentlessly.
Belkins
Belkins is the Belgian judo champion who is also a model, known as the Judo Queen. She loses to Yawara in the semifinals match at the Seoul Olympics and crowns Yawara the "New Queen".
Yuutenji
Yuutenji is the judo coach for Sakai College, reputed to be the best in judo. He has been scheming with Jigoro to recruit Yawara.
Kaga Kuniko
Kuniko is a new photographer for the Daily Every Sport. She wears glasses, flaunts her big breasts with revealing clothing, and uses her ability to cry hysterically on command to get her way. She develops a crush on Matsuda and falsely pretends to be his "girlfriend" in front of others, repeatedly plotting to ruin the relationship between Matsuda and Yawara.
Ito Fujiko
Played by: Reiko Hirayama
Fujiko is a very tall student (180 cm, a little over 5′11″) at Mitsuba Women's College whose goal is to experience a "once-in-lifetime youth" and meet a wonderful man. She is somewhat gloomy and sensitive about her height, which she inherits from both sides of her family. She is not popular with men (until she meets Hanazono) and often ends up drinking alone at social gatherings. She dedicated her youth to ballet dancing until she grew too tall. She becomes Yawara's best friend at college. She organizes Mitsuba's first judo club to help restore Yawara's passion for judo. Under Jigoro's training, she becomes an excellent judoka herself due to her ballerina training, height, and hard work, but lacks confidence and psychological toughness as a competitor. The latter part of the show features her development as a judoka as much as Yawara.
Komiya Yukari
Komiya is a short-haired student at Mitsuba Women's College. She is flirtatious and a veteran dater. Her stated goal is hook a rich man for marriage. She is friends with Yawara and Fujiko but never joins the Mitsuba judo team.
Minamida Yoko
Yoko, aka "Paddy-field", joins the Mitsuba team out of frustration after being repeatedly dumped by men (13 when she joined; 19 when she graduated). She uses "(Man's name) you jerk!" as a battle cry when she fights. She becomes a police officer after judo.
Kikage Kyoto
Nicknamed "Kyon-kyon" (the shadow), she is a small sickly woman who is usually "invisible" in gatherings. She weighs only 36 kg (about 79 lb). She joins Mitsuba judo to get stronger in health. Although weak, she is also brave and great with details by keeping notes on opponents and is able to absorb Yawara's instructions even without being taught any real moves by Jigoro.
Yoshinagawa Sayuri
Sayuri joins Mitsuba judo to lose weight. Although not skilled, she often is able to use her weight to pin down opponents ("Thank God I'm fat!") and can take great punishment. She believes that each match reduces her weight by a few kg. People often mispronounce her surname.
Oda Mari
Nicknamed "Marilyn", she is the least serious of the Mitsuba judo club and is mostly seen preening for the camera. Often attracting men's attentions and sometimes molesters, she joins judo to fend them off. She is buxom and wears makeup and earrings to matches, causing her to be disqualified. She aspires to be an actress.

== Production ==
While Naoki Urasawa was pitching the idea of writing a manga about the medical field, he could tell his editor was not enjoying it. Knowing that the editor was a big fan of baseball, he jokingly proposed a story about women's judo, but the editor lit up at the idea. Urasawa said that he then scribbled out the whole of Yawara! during that meeting in about 30 minutes, from the characters to the story.

The series started in 1986, women's judo became a demonstration sport just before the 1988 Summer Olympics with it set to be a fully competitive sport at the 1992 Summer Olympics, so it was perfect to include that goal in the manga. But the author never thought the series would last long enough to reach the latter. Urasawa revealed that with Yawara! being so different from his previous works as a comedy about a cute girl, some of his fans and colleagues felt betrayed and that he had sold out. But he does not see it that way as he never had any intentions of making it a love comedy or a "fight-to-the-finish, don't-give-up-now! sports" story. He said "My subjects of my comics might be taken from the popular mainstream, but I believe they are still embued with my own sensitivities and therefore quite distinctive in their own right." The author said that he intended for Yawara! to be a parody of Ikki Kajiwara's works, such as Star of the Giants. But for some reason readers got something out of it other than he intended; "Maybe it's because they're used to sports comics, but they seem to like my comics for the scenes of victory and defeat. They find them interesting somehow. Those scenes were really supposed to be funny! But they find them touching, so I'm at a bit of a loss as to what to do."

Urasawa said that because he is not the heroic type himself, he has difficulty portraying strong-willed leading characters. He said it was even difficult to portray Yawara and Matsuda, whom he described as "very good supporting characters" as it seems to be much easier for him to develop supporting characters. The author cited American television comedies as his comedic influences. Jigoro's habit of forgetting people's names was taken from Samantha's mother in Bewitched.

When Urasawa was beginning Master Keaton in 1988 while still creating Yawara!, the editorial team was concerned about a young artist being able to write and draw two series at once, and so brought in story writers for the new series.

== Media ==
=== Manga ===
Written and illustrated by Naoki Urasawa, while he was simultaneously illustrating Pineapple Army, Yawara! was serialized weekly in Big Comic Spirits from the 30th issue of 1986 to the 38th issue of 1993. Publisher Shōgakukan collected the 331 chapters into 29 tankōbon volumes between April 30, 1987, and October 29, 1993. A 19 volume bunkoban edition was released between July 17, 1998, and March 16, 1999. A twenty-volume kanzenban edition was released between December 27, 2013, and April 30, 2015.

Urasawa created a spin-off manga series titled Jigoro! that ran in Zōkan Big Comic Spirits from October 20, 1988, to April 11, 1991. He explained that he found Yawara's grandfather so interesting that the character earned his own spin-off, and called it one of his favorite series. It was collected into one volume in October 1994, which was republished on February 15, 2003, and again in a kanzenban edition on April 30, 2015.

==== Volume list ====
No.	Release date	ISBN
1	April 30, 1987	4091813410
2	August 29, 1987	4091813429
3	November 30, 1987	4091813437
4	January 30, 1988	4091813445
5	April 27, 1988	4091813453
6	August 30, 1988	4091813461
7	October 29, 1988	409181347X
8	December 19, 1988	4091813488
9	March 30, 1989	4091813496
10	June 30, 1989	409181350X
11	September 30, 1989	4091821111
12	December 19, 1989	409182112X
13	March 30, 1990	4091821138
14	June 30, 1990	4091821146
15	August 30, 1990	4091821154
16	October 30, 1990	4091821162
17	March 30, 1991	4091821170
18	June 29, 1991	4091821189
19	September 30, 1991	4091821197
20	December 17, 1991	4091821200
21	March 30, 1992	4091828019
22	May 29, 1992	4091828027
23	July 30, 1992	4091828035
24	October 30, 1992	4091828043
25	March 30, 1993	4091828051
26	April 28, 1993	409182806X
27	June 30, 1993	4091828078
28	September 30, 1993	4091828086
29	October 29, 1993	4091828094

=== Anime ===
Yawara! was adapted into an anime television series titled Yawara! A Fashionable Judo Girl! by Kitty Films. The series was broadcast on Yomiuri TV between October 16, 1989, and September 21, 1992. A total of 124 episodes were produced. An animated film titled Yawara! Soreyuke Koshinuke Kizzu!! (YAWARA! それゆけ腰ぬけキッズ!!) entered theaters on August 1, 1992. It features a story based on a draft created by Urasawa. An anime TV special, titled Yawara! Special - Zutto Kimi no Koto ga... (YAWARA! Special ずっと君のことが…。), aired on Nippon TV on July 19, 1996, to conclude the series. The 1992 Barcelona Olympics are updated to the 1996 Atlanta Olympics.

The TV series was licensed for release in North America by AnimEigo in August 2006. Preorders were opened in early 2008. A box set of the first 40 episodes was released on October 31, 2008. However, AnimEigo announced in April 2010 that they had been unable to license the remaining episodes, and the first boxset went out of print on August 31, 2012.

=== Live-action film ===
A live-action film adaptation of Yawara! directed by Kazuo Yoshida for Toho opened in theaters on April 15, 1989. Having Yui Asaka in the title role, the film featured cameos by real life judokas like Kaori Yamaguchi and Yasuhiro Yamashita, as well as shoot wrestlers, Kōji Nakamoto Akira Maeda and Nobuhiko Takada. Asaka also sings the theme song "Neverland".

=== Video games ===
Two video games were developed by Sofix for the PC Engine CD-ROM² console. The first was a "digital comic" released on October 1, 1992, that received a rating of 22/40 by Famitsu. The second was released on September 23, 1994, has additional gameplay elements such as "battle" and "quiz" modes, and received a 21/40 rating by Famitsu.

== Reception ==
As of March 2021, Yawara! had over 30 million collected volumes in circulation. The manga won the 35th Shogakukan Manga Award for the general category in 1990. The significance of the 1992 Barcelona Olympics in the story is that in the real world, this was the first time that Women's Judo would be a full competition event and would thus see the awarding of the first Olympic gold medal for Women's Judo. Yawara! was very popular in Japan, so when real life Japanese teenager Ryoko Tamura won a silver medal for judo at the 1992 Barcelona Olympics, she was seen as a real-life Yawara (her age, stature, and ability all being strikingly similar to those of the fictional character) and promptly nicknamed "Yawara-chan". She was still known by this name eight years later, indicating perhaps the enduring popular recognition of the series as well as that of Ryoko Tamura.

Mark Sammut of Comic Book Resources wrote that while Yawara! "might not have many of the trademarks that would come to define Urasawa's later thrillers," the humorous sports series "still serves as a masterclass in character writing and atmosphere." He also called its prequel series, Jigoro!, the funniest thing Urasawa has ever written. Reviewing Animeigo's release of the first 40 episodes of the anime, Carl Kimlinger of Anime News Network wrote that Yawara! seamlessly blends romance, humor, life hurdles and sports intrigue. He strongly praised Yawara Inokuma's character and noted that the series is far more focused on romance and coming of age than it is judo. The reviewer finished by lamenting that they do not make anime like this anymore, as they seem to have forgotten the appeal of a simple story told well; Yawara! "is quite simply, the most purely enjoyable series in years."

Kimlinger went on to pick Yawara Inokuma as his 2008 Character of the Year and called her "possibly the most insanely likeable character ever devised—all the more so because she is as flawed, selfish and naive as any real adolescent girl." While including the series on a list of the best anime from 1989, his colleague of the same website Daryl Surat wrote that she inspired numerous fighting video game characters. Namely in the Street Fighter series where Ibuki has a similar background and temperament, and Karin Kanzuki is very similar to Sayaka Honami.
