= Ken Shimura =

Japanese comedian (1950–2020)

- 志村けん
- Born: Yasunori Shimura (志村 康徳); 20 February 1950; Higashimurayama, Tokyo, Japan
- Died: 29 March 2020 (aged 70); Shinjuku, Tokyo, Japan
- Education: Tokyo Metropolitan Kurume High School
- Occupations: Comedian; actor; voice actor; singer; television personality
- Years active: 1972–2020

Notes
- Same year/generation as: Beat Takeshi; Shofukutei Tsurube II

Yasunori Shimura (志村 康徳, Shimura Yasunori; February 20, 1950 – March 29, 2020), known professionally as Ken Shimura (志村 けん, Shimura Ken), was a Japanese comedian. He was born in Higashimurayama, Tokyo.

He started his career as an assistant to the comedy band The Drifters, led by Chōsuke Ikariya. In 1974, He joined the group, replacing Chū Arai. He appeared as members of the group on popular comedy shows that gained massive popularity from the 1970s to the 1980s. Hachiji-dayo! Zen'in-shūgō achieved the highest viewership rating of 50.5%, and The Drifters Daibakushō (ドリフ大爆笑) reached 40.4% viewership. These shows made him nationally popular. After the end of Hachiji-dayo! in 1985, he began to work independently as well. He appeared on shows like Kato-chan Ken-chan Gokigen TV (加トちゃんケンちゃんごきげんテレビ), with Cha Katō, a fellow member of the group, Shimura Ken no Daijōbu-dā (志村けんのだいじょうぶだぁ)," and Shimura Ken no Baka Tono-sama (志村けんのバカ殿様), portraying characters like Baka Tono-sama (バカ殿様, Stupid Lord) and Hen na Oji-san (変なおじさん, Strange Older Man). These characters became highly popular.

Shimura's comedic work was inspired in part by that of Jerry Lewis.

== Career ==
Shimura became a full member of The Drifters in 1974, replacing Chū Arai. With the group, he appeared on the TBS variety show Hachiji Dayo! Zen'inshūgō! until the series ended in 1985. The program, which ran from 1969 to 1985, reached a peak household audience rating of 50.5%.

In January 1986, Shimura and fellow Drifters member Cha Katō began starring in the successor program Kato-chan Ken-chan Gokigen TV. It ran until March 1992, producing 312 episodes and reaching a peak audience rating of 36%.

Shimura also starred in Shimura Ken no Daijōbu-dā, which aired on Fuji TV from November 1987 to September 1993 and returned as a series of specials from 2007 to 2020.

=== Post-Daijoubuda ===
Following up his previous big hits, Shimura led several shows, mostly on the Fuji TV network. From 1996, he began working with newbie Yuuka. Shimura's participation in the career of humorists (such as Katsuhiro Higo and Ryuuhei Ueshima, and Haruna Kondou and Haruka Minowa) and other celebrities is notorious.

- 1993–1995: Shimura Ken wa Ikagadeshou ("How about a Ken Shimura") – with Masashi Tashiro, Yoko Ishino, Nobuyoshi Kuwano, Minayo Watanabe, etc.
- 1995–1996: Shimura Ken no Ore ga Nani Shitano yo ("Ken Shimura's What the Hell Did I do?") – with Masashi Tashiro, Nobuyoshi Kuwano, Minayo Watanabe, etc.
- 1996–1997: Shimura X – with Maiko Kawakami, Yukiko Someya, Kazumi Murata, Yuuka, Housei Yamasaki and Ryuuhei Ueshima.
- 1997–1998: Shimura XYZ – with Maiko Kawakami, Yukiko Someya, Kazumi Murata, Yuuka, Housei Yamasaki and Ryuuhei Ueshima.
- 1998–2000: Shimura X-Tengoku ("Shimura Paradise X") – with Maiko Kawakami, Yukiko Someya, Kazumi Murata, Yuuka, Housei Yamasaki and Ryuuhei Ueshima.
- 2000–2002: Henna Ojisan TV ("Strange Uncle's TV") – with Yuuka, Katsuhiro Higo, Ryuuhei Ueshima, Masanori Ishii and Yoshiyuki Ishizuka.
- 2002–2004: Shimura Ryuu ("Shimura's Style") – with Yuuka, Katsuhiro Higo, Ryuuhei Ueshima, Masanori Ishii, Yoshiyuki Ishizuka, Chizuru Yamada and Ayumi Kato.
- 2004: Shimura Juku ("Shimura's Class") – with Yuuka, Katsuhiro Higo, Ryuuhei Ueshima, Masanori Ishii, Yoshiyuki Ishizuka, Chizuru Yamada, Ayumi Kato, etc.
- 2004–2005: Shimura Tsuu ("Shimura, a tasteful person") – with Yuuka, Katsuhiro Higo, Ryuuhei Ueshima, Jun Natsukawa, Chizuru Yamada, etc.
- 2005–2008: Shimura Ken no Daijoubuda II ("Ken Shimura's I'm All Right II") – with Yuuka, Katsuhiro Higo, Ryuuhei Ueshima, Wakako Shimazaki, Jun Natsukawa and Chen Qu.
- 2004–2020: Tensai! Shimura Dōbutsuen ("Genius! Shimura Zoo") – with chimpanzee Pankun and his son.
- 2008–2020: Shimura Ya Desu ("It's Shimura's Store") – with Yuuka, Katsuhiro Higo, Ryuuhei Ueshima, Haruna Kondou, Haruka Minowa, Emi Kobayashi and Erika Yazawa.

In 2001, Shimura formed a duet with Naoko Ken as "Ken♀♂Ken" in "Ginza atari de Gin Gin Gin" (銀座あたりでギンギンギン).

In 2006, he formed and led his own comedy theater, Shimurakon (Shimura Spirit).

Tensai! Shimura Dōbutsuen continued airing after Shimura's death, with on air remembrances of his time with the animals. On July 4, 2020, it was reported that Nippon TV had decided to end the broadcast, citing that it would be painfully difficult and heartbreaking to continue filming in a set filled with memories, that was destined for Shimura's advice. The last broadcast was set for September.

== Illness and death ==
Shimura was hospitalized for severe pneumonia on March 20th 2020; he lost consciousness after being anesthetized and hooked up to a ventilator on the following day. Then, on March 23rd it was confirmed that he had COVID-19. He was the first Japanese tarento to have his COVID-19 diagnosis made public during the COVID-19 pandemic in Japan.

On March 24th, Shimura was transferred to a hospital where ECMO was available. He had been scheduled to star in the film It's a Flickering Life, but his participation was cancelled on March 26th. He was also slated to carry the Olympic torch through part of Tokyo prior to the 2020 Tokyo games.

Shimura died on March 29th 2020 at the National Center for Global Health and Medicine in Shinjuku, Tokyo. He was 70 years old.

== Filmography ==
- Poppoya (1999), Hajime Yoshioka
- The Lorax (2012), The Lorax (Japanese dub voice)
- Yo-kai Watch: The Movie (2014), Master Nyada (voice)
- Yell (2020, TV series), Kōzō Oyamada

== Discography ==
=== As featured artist ===
Title	Year	Peak chart positions	Sales	Album	Certifications
Title	Year	JPN	Sales	Album	Certifications
"Aīn Taisō" (アイ〜ン体操) / "Aīn! Dance no Uta" (アイ〜ン!ダンスの唄) (as Bakatono-sama with Mini-Moni Hime)	2002	3	JPN: 200,000+	Mini-Moni Song Daihyakka Ikkan	RIAJ: Gold
"—" denotes releases that did not chart or were not released in that region.

== See also ==
- Statue of Ken Shimura
