= Cha Katō =

Japanese actor and comedian (born 1943)

- 加藤 茶
- Born: Hideyuki Katō 加藤英文; March 1, 1943 (age 82); Setagaya, Tokyo, Japan
- Occupations: Comedian; actor; drummer
- Years active: 1962–present
- Spouses: Suzuko Katō (m. 1986; div. 2003); Ayana Katō (m. 2011)

Cha Katō (加藤 茶, Katō Cha; born 1 March 1943), also known as Kato-chan, is a Japanese comedian and actor. His real name is Hideyuki Katō (加藤英文). Cha is one of the members of The Drifters and plays drums. His work with Ken Shimura, another Drifter, is well known in Japan.

== Personal life ==
In November 1987, Katō married his non-celebrity partner who was 18 years his junior and their wedding reception was broadcast live on television on the show Katchan Kenchan Gokigen TV on November 21, it recorded one of the highest audience rating at 36.3%, the fourth highest viewership rating of any celebrity wedding reception broadcast in Japanese history. He divorced his wife in March 2003. Katō shares three children with his first wife.

Many in Japan were surprised when it was announced in 2011 that he had married a woman 45 years younger than him (making her 22 years old). They held their wedding ceremony a year later in March 11, 2012.

== TV programs ==
- Hachiji da yo! Zen'in shūgō (1969–85) (with other members of The Drifters).
- Fun TV with Kato-chan and Ken-chan (with Ken Shimura).
- Dorifu Daibakusho (1977–98) (with other members of The Drifters).
