= Kato-chan Ken-chan Gokigen TV =

Japanese television variety show

- Genre: Variety show
- Starring: Ken Shimura; Cha Kato
- Theme music composer: Tsugutoshi Kato
- Composer: Akihiko Takashima
- Country of origin: Japan
- Original language: Japanese

Production
- Producer: Toshiaki Takahashi
- Production company: TBS

Original release
- Network: JNN (TBS)
- Release: January 11, 1986 – March 28, 1992

Related
- America's Funniest Home Videos; Australia's Funniest Home Videos; Vídeos de primera; You've Been Framed!

Kato-chan Ken-chan Gokigen TV (加トちゃんケンちゃんごきげんテレビ, Kato-chan Ken-chan Gokigen Terebi) is a Japanese television variety show that aired on Tokyo Broadcasting System and its affiliates from 1986 to 1992.

== History ==
Starring Ken Shimura and Cha Kato, former members of the group The Drifters from Hachiji Dayo! Zen'in Shugo, the irreverent and satirical program would poke fun at contemporary society in Japan, and would feature comedy vignettes similar to those found on The Benny Hill Show or The Carol Burnett Show. Leslie Nielsen once made a special appearance on the show as well.

The duo also had a PC Engine video game, Kato-chan and Ken-chan, based on their antics, filled with toilet humor, and featuring them as playable characters. It was translated and censored for a Western TurboGrafx-16 release as J.J. & Jeff due to copyright issues and the toilet humor.

== Home videos segment ==
As the home camcorder became more popular in Japan, the show included a segment featuring viewer-submitted funny home videos (home movies), on which Ken and Kato would comment.

In 1989, American producer Vin Di Bona initiated a partnership with Tokyo Broadcasting System to develop a similar program in the west; ultimately, this led to the successful America's Funniest Home Videos and other similar shows worldwide. Some videos seen in the first season of America's Funniest Home Videos originally aired on Fun TV with Kato-chan and Ken-chan, and the latter remains credited within all episodes of AFHV as the original inspiration for the former. ABC, which owns half of America's Funniest Home Videos, pays a royalty fee to the Tokyo Broadcasting System for the use of the format (even though Kato-chan and Ken-chan left the air in 1992).

The British show You've Been Framed! (1990–2022) was similarly based on the same format.

International versions:
Years aired	Title	Country
1989–present	America's Funniest Home Videos	United States
1990–2014	Australia's Funniest Home Videos	Australia
1990–1995	New Zealand's Funniest Home Videos	New Zealand
1990–2022	You've Been Framed!	United Kingdom
1990–1998	Vídeos De Primera	Spain
1997–2000	La Cara Divertida	Spain
1990–1998, 2005–2006	Bitte Lächeln!/Bitte lachen!	Germany
1990–2008	Video Gag	France
1990–1998	Isto Só Video	Portugal
1990–2000	Drôle de vidéo	Canada
1990–2004	Videodinges	Belgium
2014	America's Funniest Videos Brazil	Brazil
2014, 2016–2018	America's Funniest Videos Latinonamerica	Peru
1990–2004	De Leukste Thuis	Netherlands
2002–present	Lachen om Home Video's	Netherlands
1990–2013	Paperissima - Errori in TV	Italy
1990, 1995, 1997, 1999, 2001, 2005, 2007–2009, 2011–2025	Paperissima Sprint	Italy
1991–1997	Låt Kameran Gå	Sweden
1991–2002	Video Loco	Chile
1992–2019	Сам себе режиссёр	Russia
1994–2009	Śmiechu Warte	Poland
1995–2010	Tak neváhej a toč!	Czech Republic
1999–2005	Natočto!	Czech Republic
2004–2009	Bitoy's Funniest Videos	Philippines
1998–2001	Csíííz!	Hungary
2006–2008	Vidióták	Hungary
1990–2000	Det' ren kagemand	Denmark
1999–2006, 2012–2016	¡Ay caramba!	Mexico
1989–2021	Video Cassetadas	Brazil
1995–1998	Naurun paikka	Finland
1990–1992	Spede's Funniest Home Videos	Finland
2007–2013	Вусолапохвіст	Ukraine
1999–2003	Smiechoty	Slovakia
2007–2008	Snutter	Norway
