= Kōji Nakamoto =

Japanese actor and comedian (1941–2022)

- Born: July 5, 1941; Shibuya, Tokyo, Japan
- Died: October 19, 2022 (aged 81); Yokohama, Kanagawa Prefecture, Japan
- Education: Gakushuin University
- Occupations: Comedian, actor, guitarist, singer
- Years active: 1963–2022

Kōji Nakamoto (仲本 工事, Nakamoto Kōji; July 5, 1941 – October 19, 2022) was a Japanese comedian. His real name is Kōki Nakamoto (仲本 興喜). He was one of the members of The Drifters.

Nakamoto graduated from Gakushuin University. He occasionally appeared in the dramas and films as an actor.

On the 19 October 2022, Nakamoto died after being hit by a car at an intersection in Yokohama City, suffering a severe head injury. He was 81.

== Works ==
=== Variety show ===
- Hachiji Dayo, Zen'inshugo! ('It's eight o'clock PM, everyone together!', 1969–85)
- Dorifu Daibakusho (1976–2003)
- Tobe Son Goku (1977–78)

=== Television drama ===
- Tōyama no Kin-san (1985–86) as Hirame Ginjirō
- Sōrito Yobanaide (1997) as Deputy Secretary-General of the Cabinet Secretariat
- Scrap Teacher (2008) as John Sakita

=== Film ===
- Yawara! (1989) as Kamoda
- Asako I & II (2018) as Hirakawa
