= Statue of Ken Shimura =

Statue in Tokyo, Japan

- Year: 2021
- Medium: Bronze sculpture
- Subject: Ken Shimura
- Location: Higashimurayama, Tokyo, Japan; 35°45′40.1″N 139°27′58.2″E

A bronze statue of Ken Shimura was unveiled in Higashimurayama, Tokyo, Japan, in 2021.
