= Siam Shade (album) =

Studio album by Siam Shade
- Released: December 10, 1994
- Recorded: June – July, 1994
- Studios: Bazooka; Kannonzaki Marine
- Genre: Hard rock
- Length: 24:27
- Label: Leaf Mt.
- Producer: Siam Shade

Siam Shade chronology
Siam Shade (1994)	Siam Shade II (1995)

Siam Shade is the debut mini-album by the Japanese rock band Siam Shade, released by Leaf Mt. on December 10, 1994. It sold 10,000 copies and reached number two on Oricon's independent albums chart. A remastered and expanded version of the album, titled Siam Shade Spirits 1993, was released in April 2012.

== Overview ==
It was recorded from the end of June 1994 to the beginning of July, and mixed that September. Some of the songs were previously included on the band's May 1993 self-titled demo tape.

The album was remastered and re-released in April 2012 under the title Siam Shade Spirits 1993, with three additional songs.

== Reception ==
Siam Shade sold 10,000 copies and reached number two on Oricon's independent albums chart. In 2004, it was named one of the top albums from 1989–1998 in an issue of the music magazine Band Yarouze.

In a contemporary review for the special November 1995 Generation Edge issue of Rockin'f magazine, Yukinobu Hasegawa described the album as featuring catchy songs that keep the melody front and center, even during technical and complex arrangements, and cited the twin vocals between Hideki and Kazuma as a highlight.

In a retrospective review, music writer Takuya Ito wrote that Siam Shade's signature sound, melancholic hard rock with technical developments, was already established by the time of this first album. He cited "Toki no Kawa no Naka de" as an example of their "exquisite" signature twin vocals and noted that "No Control" and "Imagination" went on to become staple songs that the band continued to perform throughout their career.

== Track listing ==
All tracks are written by Siam Shade.

Siam Shade track listing
No.	Title	Length
1.	"No Control" (Originally written by Chack and composed by Daita)	3:26
2.	"Imagination" (Originally written and composed by Chack)	3:05
3.	"Ima wa Tada... (今はただ…)" (Originally written and composed by Chack)	4:51
4.	"Don't" (Originally written and composed by Kazuma)	4:54
5.	"Toki no Kawa no Naka de (時の川の中で)" (Originally written and composed by Kazuma)	3:30
6.	"Lose My Reason" (Originally written and composed by Kazuma)	4:46

Siam Shade Spirits 1993 additional tracks
No.	Title	Length
1.	"Light for Closed Your Eyes"	2:57
8.	"End of Love"	4:16
9.	"Doll"	5:51

== Personnel ==
Siam Shade

- Chack – vocals
- Kazuma – vocals and guitar
- Daita – guitar and backing vocals
- Natin – bass and backing vocals
- Junji – drums, percussion and backing vocals

Production

- Takahiro Uchida – recording and mixing
- Yoshinori Shimizu – recording
- Hikari Mitsufuji – mastering
- Katsuto Hayama – direction
- Takahiro Hongoh – cover design
- Saori Tsuji – photography
