= Boo Takagi =

Japanese actor and comedian

- Born: 8 March 1933 (age 93); Toshima, Tokyo, Japan
- Occupations: Comedian, guitarist
- Years active: 1955–present

Boo Takagi (高木 ブー, Takagi Bū) (born 8 March 1933, Toshima, Tokyo) is a Japanese comedian and musician (guitarist and ukulele player). His real name is Tomonosuke Takagi (高木 友之助). Takagi is one of the members of The Drifters.

== Works ==
- Hachiji Dayo, Zen'inshugo! (1969–85)
- Dorifu Daibakusho (1976–2003)
- Tobe Son Goku (1977–78)
