= The Drifters (Japanese group) =

Japanese band

The Drifters ザ・ドリフターズ
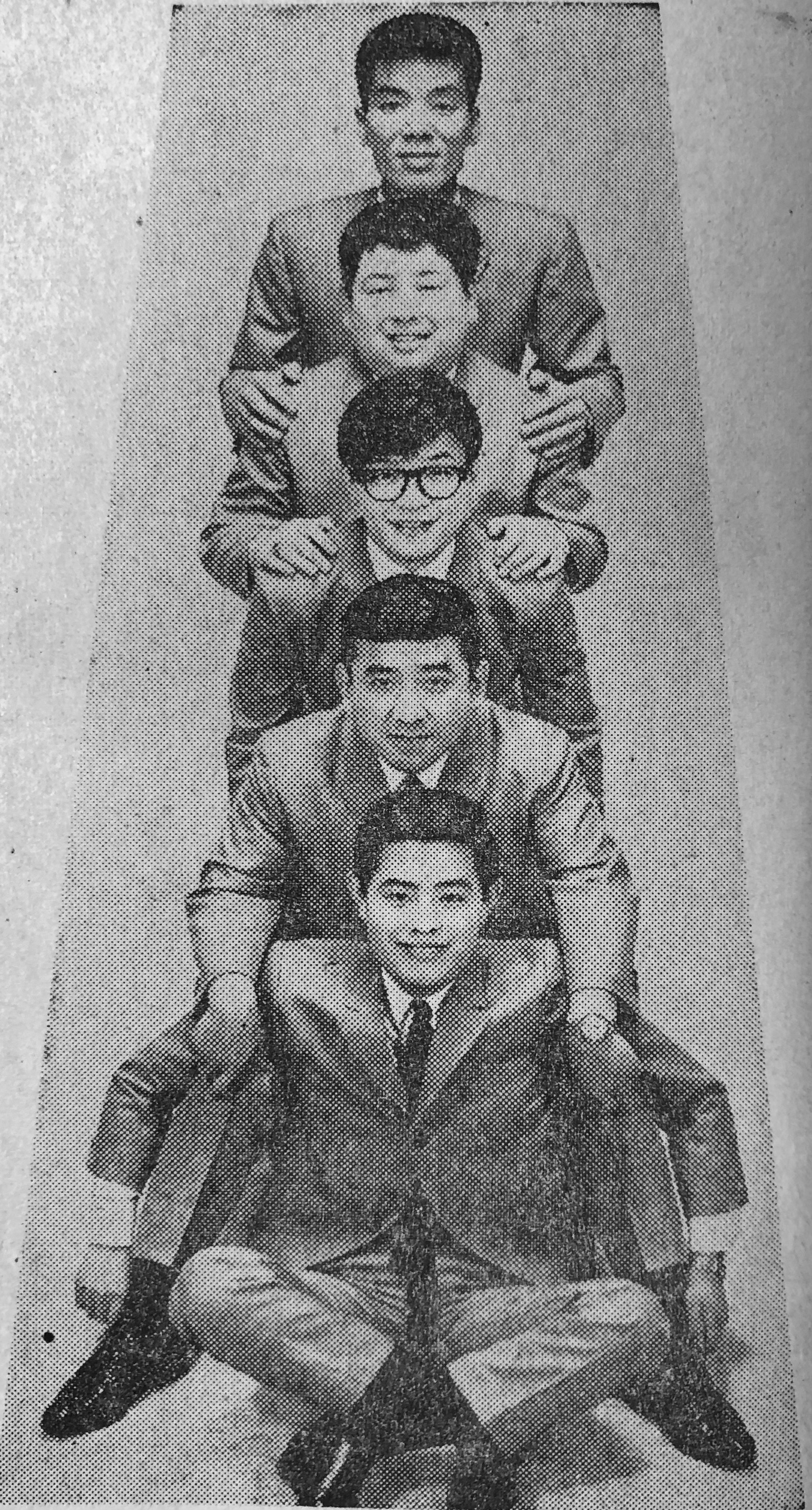

Background information
- Origin: Japan
- Genres: Rock and roll, novelty rock, comedy rock
- Years active: 1956–present
- Members: Cha Kato (drums); Boo Takagi (guitar)
- Past members: Chōsuke Ikariya (bass guitar); Chū Arai (keyboards); Ken Shimura (keyboards); Kōji Nakamoto (guitar)
- Same year/generation as: Count 55-go Kiyoshi Nishikawa; Katsura Bunshi VI

The Drifters (ザ・ドリフターズ, Za Dorifutāzu) are a Japanese rock and roll band and comedy group. The band formed as Sons of Drifters around 1956 with members of two bands, Jimmy Tokita & His Mountain Playboys and Tokyo Western Boys.

However, members in the group changed back and forth occasionally. Chosuke Ikariya became the group's leader in 1964. Although the band became famous as a comedy group under Ikariya, they took part in the Kōhaku Uta Gassen as a musical band for the first time in 2001. Ikariya died of lymph node cancer in 2004 at the age of 72.

The group is also known for its 40-second performance as an opening act for The Beatles' first-ever concert in Japan.

== Members ==
- Chōsuke Ikariya — Leader, joined 1962 during the group's band era, died of lymph node cancer in 2004
- Cha Katō — Joined 1962
- Boo Takagi — Joined 1964
- Chū Arai — Joined 1964, left the group in 1974, died of liver failure in 2000
- Kōji Nakamoto — Joined 1965, died of acute subdural hematoma after suffering serious head injury from traffic collision in 2022
- Ken Shimura — Joined as an assistant member in 1968, became an official member 1974 (replacing Arai), he died from COVID-19 in 2020

== Hachijidayo Zen'inshūgō! ==
They are most famous for the regular variety show Hachiji da yo! Zen'in shūgō, which aired on TBS from 1969 to 1985 with a total of 803 episodes. It held the highest ratings of any program in its time, and still holds one of the highest program ratings in Japanese television history. Its low-brow humour and slapstick comedy made it popular with children much to the dismay of parents. The Candies were their co-stars during most of the 1970s.

The show itself was a comedy variety show that featured sketches and musical guests. Often the show opened with a long sketch that lasted for about 20–25 minutes and then musical guests were featured. The show would round out the hour with a few more sketches, often with the musical guests participating in these.

Besides the regular weekly show, The Drifters, or "Dorifu" as they came to be called, would also have special presentations every few months. These specials would be an hour and a half and would consist of many short sketches. Often they would have special guests, usually famous singing performers, that would participate in the sketches but would not always sing during the show.

In the late 1970s, between 1977–1978, The Drifters were often linked to the singing duo Pink Lady through a series of popular fumetti style manga and Yanmar Family Hour Fly! Son Goku (ヤンマーファミリーアワー 飛べ!孫悟空, Yanmā Famirī Awā Tobe! Son Gokū), a children's show based on Journey to the West. The show featured puppet caricatures of the Drifters as the principal characters while Pink Lady provided narration and the show's theme song, as well as insert songs based on their hit singles.

== Solo projects ==
After Hachijidayo! ended in 1985, the group virtually disbanded but continued to get together for their occasional hour and a half specials (see ドリフ大爆笑). Ken Shimura teamed up with Cha Kato for the series Katochan Kenchan Gokigen TV (Fun TV with Kato-chan and Ken-chan). Koji Nakamoto became a regular on the TV program Toyamano Kinsan. Boo Takagi recorded a number of albums of Hawaiian style music.

After Katochan Kenchan Gokigen TV, Cha Kato became a regular on the program "Musashibo Benkei" and appeared as a special guest on other TV programs. After Katochan Kenchan Gokigen TV, Ken Shimura also starred in other TV shows such as "Shimura Ken no Bakatonosama" and "Shimuraken no Daijobuda" and guest starred on other TV shows.

In 1999, Chosuke Ikariya won the Japanese Academy Awards of Best Supporting Actor for his performance of Heihachiro Waku in the movie Bayside Shakedown. Chōsuke Ikariya died on March 20, 2004, at the age of 72 of cancer of the lymph nodes. He announced his illness in June of the previous year, and left the hospital once in July afterwards for the opening of the movie Bayside Shakedown 2.

In April 2002, Ken Shimura recorded a one-off single with Hello! Project's unit "Mini Moni", with the collaboration credited to "Bakatono to Mini Moni Hime" (バカ殿様とミニモニ。姫). They recorded two songs named after a catch phrase of his, "Ai-in".

== In popular culture ==
Their song Ii Yu Da Na (いい湯だな) was featured in the video game series Death Stranding, first in the form of an Easter egg that can be triggered and cause the main character to sing some of the song while bathing in a hot spring, and more prominently in Death Stranding 2: On The Beach, with Cha Katō making a small cameo.

== See also ==
- Crazy Cats
- Kyu Sakamoto
