= Hachiji da yo! Zen'in shūgō =

Japanese comedy television show

- Starring: The Drifters

Original release
- Network: TBS
- Release: 1969 – 1985

Hachiji da yo! Zen'in shūgō (8時だョ!全員集合, It's 8 o'clock! Gather around, everyone!) was a Japanese comedy television show that originally aired from 1969 to 1985 on TBS. Its main attraction was sketch comedy acts performed by The Drifters. It featured large-scale stage sets and innovative props, and enjoyed enormous popularity.
