= List of Golden Kamuy episodes =

Key visual featuring Saichi Sugimoto (back) and Asirpa (front)

Golden Kamuy is a Japanese anime television series based on the manga of the same name written and illustrated by Satoru Noda. The anime television series adaptation was produced by Geno Studio. It was directed by Hitoshi Nanba and written by Noboru Takagi, with music by Kenichiro Suehiro, art direction by Atsushi Morikawa, and CG direction by Yuuko Okumura and Yasutaka Hamada. Kenichi Ohnuki adapted the character designs for animation, while Koji Watanabe designed firearms, Shinya Anasuma designed the props, and Ryō Sumiyoshi designed the animals. Like with the manga, Hiroshi Nakagawa, an Ainu language linguist from Chiba University, works on the anime as an Ainu language supervisor.

The anime comprises five seasons. The first season aired from April 9 to June 25, 2018, on Tokyo MX, ytv, STV, and BS11. The second season aired from October 8 to December 24, 2018. The third season aired from October 5 to December 21, 2020. The fourth season was announced in December 2021 with renewed staff members. Brain's Base produced the season, replacing Geno Studio. Shizutaka Sugahara served as the chief director, and Takumi Yamakawa designed the characters. Noboru Takagi is returning to write the scripts. The season premiered on October 3, 2022. On November 7, 2022, it was announced that the seventh episode of the season and beyond would be postponed due to the death of a main staff member. The season restarted broadcasting from the first episode from April 3 until June 26, 2023. The fifth season aired from January 5 to March 30, 2026.

Five original video animations (OVAs) have been produced. The first, based on the manga's "Barato" arc, was released on DVD in a bundle with the manga's 15th Japanese volume on September 19, 2018. The second was released with the manga's 17th Japanese volume on March 19, 2019. The third, based on the "Monster" arc, was released with the manga's 19th Japanese volume on September 19, 2019. The fourth, based on the "Shiton Animal Record" arc, was bundled with the 23rd manga volume on September 18, 2020. The fifth, based on the "Lightning and O-Gin" arc, was bundled on Blu-ray with the novel Golden Kamuy: Tokushirou Tsurumi no Shukugan on October 17, 2025.

Golden Dōga Gekijō is a series of 25-second long animated shorts directed by Kenshirō Morii and produced by DMM.futureworks and W-Toon Studio, that premiered on YouTube on April 16, 2018.

== Series overview ==
Season	Episodes	Originally released	
Season	Episodes	First released	Last released
1	12	April 9, 2018	June 25, 2018
OVAs	5	September 19, 2018	October 17, 2025
2	12	October 8, 2018	December 24, 2018
3	12	October 5, 2020	December 21, 2020
4	13	October 3, 2022	June 26, 2023
5	13	January 5, 2026	March 30, 2026

== Episodes ==
=== Season 1 (2018) ===
No. overall	No. in season	Title (Note: English translated titles are taken from Crunchyroll.)	Directed by	Written by	Storyboarded by	Original release date
1	1	"Wenkamuy"; Transliteration: "Wenkamui" (Japanese: ウェンカムイ)	Takahiro Kawakoshi	Noboru Takagi	Namimi Sanjo	April 9, 2018
2	2	"Nopperabo"; Transliteration: "Nopperabō" (Japanese: のっぺら坊)	Shigeki Awai	Noboru Takagi	Namimi Sanjo	April 16, 2018
3	3	"Kamuy Mosir"; Transliteration: "Kamui Moshiri" (Japanese: カムイモシㇼ)	Shigeru Fukase	Noboru Takagi	Soji Ninomiya	April 23, 2018
4	4	"Grim Reaper"; Transliteration: "Shinigami" (Japanese: 死神)	Yūsuke Onoda	Shingo Irie	Miyana Okita	April 30, 2018
5	5	"Race"; Transliteration: "Kakeru" (Japanese: 駆ける)	Akira Toba	Sachio Yanai	Akira Toba	May 7, 2018
6	6	"Hunter's Soul"; Transliteration: "Ryōshi no Tamashī" (Japanese: 猟師の魂)	Michita Shiraishi	Aya Yoshinaga	Satoshi Nishimura	May 14, 2018
7	7	"Complication"; Transliteration: "Sakusō" (Japanese: 錯綜)	Kiyoshi Egami	Atsuo Ishino	Futoshi Higashide	May 21, 2018
8	8	"Eyes of a Murderer"; Transliteration: "Satsujinki no Me" (Japanese: 殺人鬼の目)	Kazuomi Koga	Shingo Irie	Namimi Sanjo	May 28, 2018
9	9	"Gleaming"; Transliteration: "Kirameku" (Japanese: 煌めく)	Shigeru Fukase	Aya Yoshinaga	Miyana Okita	June 4, 2018
10	10	"Fellow Traveler"; Transliteration: "Michizure" (Japanese: 道連れ)	Michita Shiraishi	Daishirō Tanimura	Miyana Okita	June 11, 2018
11	11	"Everybody, Get Together! It's a Murder Hotel!"; Transliteration: "Satsujin Hoteruda yo zen'in shūgō!!" (Japanese: 殺人ホテルだよ全員集合!!)	Yutaka Hirata	Shingo Irie	Tomohiro Kamitani	June 18, 2018
12	12	"Trickster Fox"; Transliteration: "Taburakasu Kitsune" (Japanese: 誑かす狐)	Akira Toba	Noboru Takagi	Akira Toba	June 25, 2018

=== Season 2 (2018) ===
No. overall	No. in season	Title	Directed by	Written by	Storyboarded by	Original release date
13	1	"Edogai-kun"; Transliteration: "Edogai-kun" (Japanese: 江渡貝くん)	Masato Miyoshi	Noboru Takagi	Miyana Okita	October 8, 2018
14	2	"Fakes"; Transliteration: "Magaimono" (Japanese: まがいもの)	Kiyoshi Egami	Aya Yoshinaga	Kiyoshi Egami	October 15, 2018
15	3	"Let's Talk About the Past"; Transliteration: "Mukashi no Hanashi o Shiyō" (Japanese: 昔の話をしよう)	Satoshi Nakagawa	Noboru Takagi	Takeshi Mori	October 22, 2018
16	4	"The Great Plan to Infiltrate the Asahikawa 7th Division!!"; Transliteration: "Asahikawa Daishichi Shidan Sennyū Daisakusen" (Japanese: 旭川第七師団潜入大作戦!!)	Taketomo Ishikawa	Noboru Takagi	Taketomo Ishikawa	October 29, 2018
17	5	"Inside the Belly"; Transliteration: "Hara no Uchi" (Japanese: 腹の中)	Shigeru Fukase	Aya Yoshinaga	Miyana Okita	November 5, 2018
18	6	"Ani Nekko"; Transliteration: "Ani Nekko" (Japanese: 阿仁根っ子)	Akira Toba	Aya Yoshinaga	Akira Toba	November 12, 2018
19	7	"Kamuy Hopunire"; Transliteration: "Kamui Hopunire" (Japanese: カムイホプニレ)	Takuo Suzuki	Aya Yoshinaga	Miyana Okita	November 19, 2018
20	8	"Blue Eyes"; Transliteration: "Aoi Me" (Japanese: 青い眼)	Futoshi Higashide	Shingo Irie	Futoshi Higashide	November 26, 2018
21	9	"The Sound of an Ambush"; Transliteration: "Kishū no Ne" (Japanese: 奇襲の音)	Shigeru Fukase	Aya Yoshinaga	Kanta Kamei	December 3, 2018
22	10	"On the Night of the New Moon"; Transliteration: "Shingetsu no Yoru Ni" (Japanese: 新月の夜に)	Kiyoshi Egami	Daishirō Tanimura	Kiyoshi Egami	December 10, 2018
23	11	"Overwhelmed"; Transliteration: "Jūrin" (Japanese: 蹂躙)	Masato Miyoshi, Taketomo Ishikawa	Noboru Takagi	Takeshi Mori	December 17, 2018
24	12	"Call Out"; Transliteration: "Koō" (Japanese: 呼応)	Shigeru Fukase	Noboru Takagi	Namimi Sanjo	December 24, 2018

=== Season 3 (2020) ===
No. overall	No. in season	Title	Directed by	Written by	Storyboarded by	Original release date
25	1	"To Karafuto"; Transliteration: "Karafuto e" (Japanese: 樺太ヘ)	Yutaka Hirata	Noboru Takagi	Namimi Sanjo	October 5, 2020
26	2	"Stenka"; Transliteration: "Suchenka" (Japanese: スチェンカ)	Shigeru Fukase	Shingo Irie	Masahiro Ando	October 12, 2020
27	3	"Igogusa"; Transliteration: "Igokusa" (Japanese: いご草)	Akira Toba	Aya Yoshinaga	Namimi Sanjo	October 19, 2020
28	4	"The Immortal Sugimoto Harakiri Show"; Transliteration: "Fujimi no Sugimoto Harakiri Shō" (Japanese: 不死身の杉元ハラキリショー)	Yūki Morita	Shingo Irie	Masahiro Ando	October 26, 2020
29	5	"The Border"; Transliteration: "Kokkyō" (Japanese: 国境)	Yutaka Hirata	Daishirō Tanimura	Hiro Shimizu	November 2, 2020
30	6	"Bad Sign"; Transliteration: "Akuchō" (Japanese: 悪兆)	Shigeru Fukase	Aya Yoshinaga	Eiji Suganuma	November 9, 2020
31	7	"Meko Oyasi"; Transliteration: "Meko Oyashi" (Japanese: メコオヤシ)	Kaoru Suzuki	Noboru Takagi	Masahiko Ōkura	November 16, 2020
32	8	"Manslayer"; Transliteration: "Hitokiri" (Japanese: 人斬り)	Akira Toba	Daishirō Tanimura	Masahiro Ando	November 23, 2020
33	9	"Revolutionary"; Transliteration: "Kakumeika" (Japanese: 革命家)	Takashi Kumazen	Aya Yoshinaga	Takashi Kumazen	November 30, 2020
34	10	"Catching Up to the Wolf"; Transliteration: "Ōkami ni Oitsuku" (Japanese: 狼に追いつく)	Yōji Satō	Shingo Irie	Yoji Sato	December 7, 2020
35	11	"Sin and Impurity"; Transliteration: "Tsumi Kegare" (Japanese: 罪穢れ)	Shigeru Fukase	Daishirō Tanimura	Satoshi Nishimura	December 14, 2020
36	12	"To Live"; Transliteration: "Ikiru" (Japanese: 生きる)	Yutaka Hirata	Noboru Takagi	Namimi Sanjo	December 21, 2020

=== Season 4 (2022–23) ===
No. overall	No. in season	Title	Directed by	Written by	Storyboarded by	Original release date
37	1	"Rushin' Outta Russia"; Transliteration: "Aba yo Roshia" (Japanese: あばよロシア)	Shizutaka Sugihara	Noboru Takagi	Minoru Ohara	October 3, 2022
38	2	"Cocoon"; Transliteration: "Mayu" (Japanese: 繭)	Tomio Yamauchi	Noboru Takagi	Minoru Ohara	October 10, 2022
39	3	"The Smell of Sulfur"; Transliteration: "Iō no Nioi" (Japanese: 硫黄のにおい)	Tomio Yamauchi	Noboru Takagi	Minoru Ohara	October 17, 2022
40	4	"Spoiled Rich Kid"; Transliteration: "Bonbon" (Japanese: ボンボン)	Takafumi Fujii	Aya Yoshinaga	Minoru Ohara	October 24, 2022
41	5	"Cinematograph"; Transliteration: "Shinematogurafu" (Japanese: シネマトグラフ)	Tomio Yamauchi	Shingo Irie	Masahiko Murata	October 31, 2022
42	6	"Sweet Lies"; Transliteration: "Amai Uso" (Japanese: 甘い嘘)	Takeyuki Sadohara	Daishiro Tanimura	Masahiko Murata	November 7, 2022
43	7	"Fleeing Karafuto"; Transliteration: "Karafuto Dasshutsu" (Japanese: 樺太脱出)	Tomio Yamauchi	Noboru Takagi	Masahiko Murata	May 15, 2023
44	8	"Brown Bear Man"; Transliteration: "Higuma Otoko" (Japanese: ヒグマ男)	Seiya Ishida	Shingo Irie	Isamu Imakake	May 22, 2023
45	9	"Partner in Crime"; Transliteration: "Kyōhan-sha" (Japanese: 共犯者)	Takeyuki Sadohara	Aya Yoshinaga	Masayuki Miyaji	May 29, 2023
46	10	"Perfect Mother"; Transliteration: "Kanpekina Haha" (Japanese: 完璧な母)	Shizutaka Sugahara	Daishiro Tanimura	Hiroshi Ishidori	June 5, 2023
47	11	"Steamship"; Transliteration: "Jōki-sen" (Japanese: 蒸気船)	Takafumi Fujii	Noboru Takagi	Hiroshi Ishidori	June 12, 2023
48	12	"Discharge"; Transliteration: "Hassha" (Japanese: 発射)	Takeyuki Sadohara	Shingo Irie	Masayuki Miyaji	June 19, 2023
49	13	"The Vanished Kamuy"; Transliteration: "Kieta Kamui" (Japanese: 消えたカムイ)	Takafumi Fujii	Noboru Takagi	Masayuki Miyaji	June 26, 2023

=== Season 5 (2026) ===
No. overall	No. in season	Title (Note: English translated titles are taken from IMDb.)	Directed by	Written by	Storyboarded by	Original release date
50	1	"Town of Reunions"; Transliteration: "Saikai no Machi" (再会の街)	Shizutaka Sugahara	Noboru Takagi	Keiji Gotō	January 5, 2026
51	2	"Send up the Fireworks"; Transliteration: "Uchiage Hanabi" (打ち上げ花火)	Shizutaka Sugahara	Aya Yoshinaga	Kazuhiko Shibuya	January 12, 2026
52	3	"Tokushirou-san's Number One"; Transliteration: "Atsushishirō-san no Ichiban" (篤四郎さんの一番)	Shizutaka Sugahara	Daishirō Tanimura	Risako Yoshida	January 19, 2026
53	4	"Making a Homeland"; Transliteration: "Furusato o Tsukuru" (故郷を作る)	Shizutaka Sugahara	Shingo Irie	Keiji Gotō	January 26, 2026
54	5	"Pinky Bone"; Transliteration: "Koyubi no Hone" (小指の骨)	Shizutaka Sugahara	Aya Yoshinaga	Keiji Gotō	February 2, 2026
55	6	"The Cause of Everything"; Transliteration: "Subete no Genkyō" (全ての元凶)	Shizutaka Sugahara	Daishirō Tanimura	Keiji Gotō	February 9, 2026
56	7	"Ipopte"; Transliteration: "Ipopte" (イポㇷ゚テ)	Shizutaka Sugahara	Daishirō Tanimura	Masaharu Okuwaki	February 16, 2026
57	8	"Tokyo Love Story"; Transliteration: "Tōkyō Ai Monogatari" (東京愛物語)	Shizutaka Sugahara	Shingo Irie	Masaki Ōzora	February 23, 2026
58	9	"Starting Gun of Resolve"; Transliteration: "Ketsui no Gōhō" (決意の号砲)	Hiroshi Ishiodori	Noboru Takagi	Masaki Ōzora	March 2, 2026
59	10	"Our Kamuy"; Transliteration: "Watashitachi no Kamui" (私たちのカムイ)	Shizutaka Sugahara	Noboru Takagi	Masaki Ōzora	March 9, 2026
60	11	"The Battle of Goryōkaku"; Transliteration: "Goryōkaku Kōi-sen" (五稜郭攻囲戦)	Shizutaka Sugahara	Noboru Takagi	Masaki Ōzora	March 16, 2026
61	12	"Bushido"; Transliteration: "Bushidō" (武士道)	Shizutaka Sugahara	Daishirō Tanimura	Kazuhiko Shibuya	March 23, 2026
62	13	"Daughter of Wilk"; Transliteration: "Uiruku no Musume" (ウイルクの娘)	Shizutaka Sugahara	Aya Yoshinaga	Risako Yoshida	March 30, 2026

=== OVAs (2018–25) ===
No.	Title	Directed by	Written by	Storyboarded by	Original release date
1	"The Bodyguard of Barato"; Transliteration: "Barato no Yōjinbō" (Japanese: 茨戸の用心棒)	Takurō Tsukada	Daishirō Tanimura	Takurō Tsukada	September 19, 2018
1	"Terror! The Mysterious Giant Bird"; Transliteration: "Kaiki! Nazo no Kyodai Tori" (Japanese: 怪奇！謎の巨大鳥)	Takurō Tsukada	Daishirō Tanimura	Takurō Tsukada	September 19, 2018
Set concurrently with the events of episode 12. The Hidoro gang, which previously controlled the town of Barato, have been wracked by infighting after being split by the ambitious Umakichi. After Hijikata and Ogata separately learn the gang has a tattooed skin, Hijikata joins the Hidoro gang, while Ogata joins the Umakichi gang. The Umakichi gang abducts Chieko, the pregnant mistress of the Hidoro gang's boss; the child's father is secretly Shinpei, the boss' son. The gangs agree to trade the tattooed skin and Chieko, though the exchange goes badly and a gang war ensues. With almost all of the gang members dead in the aftermath of the battle, Shinpei leaves with Chieko to start a new life. Ogata, who has acquired the tattooed skin, gives it to Hijikata and asks to join his group.
2	"Love Made Me Escape From Prison"; Transliteration: "Koi wo Shita kara Datsugoku Suru Koto ni Shita" (Japanese: 恋をしたから脱獄することにした)	Takurō Tsukada	Daishirō Tanimura	Takurō Tsukada	March 19, 2019
2	"The Terrifying Battle of Deadly Poison! A Massive Snake Deep in the Hokkaido Wilderness!"; Transliteration: "Kyoufu no Moudoku Dai Shitou! Hokkaido Ouchi ni Kyodai Hebi wa Sonzai Shita!" (Japanese: 恐怖の猛毒大死闘！北海道奥地に巨大蛇は存在した！)	Takurō Tsukada	Daishirō Tanimura	Takurō Tsukada	March 19, 2019
Around a campfire, Shiraishi tells Toshizō Hijikata, Nagakura Shinpachi, Inkarmat and Kiroranke, of his time in Kabato Prison when he met Chouan Kumagishi, a master forger. Shiraishi asked him to draw a shunga for him which he kept for company, but Kumagishi drew the face of a nun who visited prisoners called Sister Miyazawa. Shiraishi thought the picture was badly drawn, a round face with tiny features, but after a while he fell in love with her and decided to escape and meet her. He made a duplicate key with the help of Kumagishi, and escaped alone on a stormy night. He pressed local yakuza for information and tracked the nun to Maebashi Prison, but he was recognized, arrested and imprisoned. This time he went on a hunger strike, shrinking so that he could squeeze through the cesspit access door and escaped again. Next he tried Kanazawa Prison, Akita Prison and Kyoto prison, eventually earning the title of The Escape King. Finally in Abashiri Prison he met her where he discovered Kumagishi's likeness was accurate. Meanwhile, Kumagishi confessed to Sister Miyazawa that all he ever wanted to do was to make great art, not become a forger. In part two, the Ainu legend is told of "Sak Somo Ayep" (Note: The name of a snake which means "that which is not spoken of in summer".) a giant, glistening black snake which is said to inhabit Hokkaido.
3	"Monster"; Transliteration: "Monsutā" (Japanese: モンスター)	Shigeru Fukase	Noboru Takagi	Namimi Sanjo	September 19, 2019
Asirpa negotiates with the American trader Mr. Eddie Dunn for the return of a sealskin wedding garment worn by her great aunt, but he will only sell it to her if she kills a huge bear which has been attacking his horses. Asirpa, Sugimoto, Kiroranke and Shiraishi and one of Dunn's men track the bear, but Asirpa realizes that there are three bears. The group take shelter in an abandoned house, but Dunn's man is grabbed through a window and killed by a bear. The situation is dire as they have not ammunition and Asirpa no longer has her bow and arrows. Inside the house they find Nakasawa Tatsuya and Wakayama Kiichiro plus the heads of two men who tried to fix the horse race at Naganuma. Sugimoto realizes that one must be a yakuza sent to kill Kiroranke and suddenly Wakayama attacks Sugimoto with his sword. However they declare a truce until they deal with the bears, not realizing that Nakasawa is one of Wakayama's men with whom he has had a sexual relationship. They roll dice to decide who must retrieve the ammunition pouch from outside, and Wakayama loses. He retrieves some bullets, but is chased and caught by a bear, however the others sees a prison tattoo on his body. The other two bears break into the house and Asirpa and Sugimoto manage to kill one and wound the other. Wakayama returns with a car and a machine gun and shoots one bear dead, however Nakasawa falls from the car and Wakayama risks his life to save him from the remaining bear. Wakayama kills the bear, but both yakuza are mortally wounded and die hand-in-hand as the sun sets. Sugimoto then prepares to skin Wakayama.
4	"Shiton Animal Record"; Transliteration: "Shiton Dōbutsu-ki" (Japanese: 支遁動物記)	Yutaka Hirata	Aya Yoshinaga	Namimi Sanjo	September 18, 2020
5	"The Lightning Thief and the Viper O-Gin"; Transliteration: "Inazuma Gōtō to Mamushi no O-gin" (Japanese: 稲妻強盗と蝮のお銀)	Fujita Kafumi	Noboru Takagi	Akiko Otsuka, Keiji Goto	October 17, 2025
5	"Long-Tailed Tit"; Transliteration: "Shima Enaga" (Japanese: シマエナガ)	Fujita Kafumi	Noboru Takagi	Akiko Otsuka, Keiji Goto	October 17, 2025

== Golden Dōga Gekijō ==
=== Season 1 (2018) ===
No.	Title	Original release date
1	"Squirrel Episode"; Transliteration: "Risu-hen" (Japanese: リス編)	April 16, 2018
Asirpa is introduced and Sugimoto eat the squirrels she has caught in the Ainu style, finely diced and raw (titatupa).
2	"Rabbit Episode"; Transliteration: "Usagi-hen" (Japanese: ウサギ編)	April 23, 2018
Asirpa and Sugimoto eat the rabbit she has caught.
3	"Otter Episode 1"; Transliteration: "Kawauso-hen 1" (Japanese: カワウソ編①)	May 1, 2018
Asirpa hunts an otter, and she offers Sugimoto the stewed head.
OVA	"Otter Episode 2"; Transliteration: "Kawauso-hen 2" (Japanese: カワウソ編②)	July 27, 2018
Asirpa and Sugimoto eat the otter she has caught.
4	"Whac-A-Shiraishi Episode"; Transliteration: "Shiraishi Tataki-hen" (Japanese: シライシたたき編)	May 8, 2018
Asirpa dreams she is playing a whac-a-mole game with Shiraishi's head popping up out of the snow.
5	"Nihei Episode"; Transliteration: "Nihei-hen" (Japanese: Nihei編)	May 15, 2018
Tetsuzou Nihei, one of the Abashiri Convicts makes a snow angel.
6	"Shiraishi vs. Ryu Episode"; Transliteration: "Shiraishi VS Ryū-hen" (Japanese: 白石VSリュウ編)	May 22, 2018
A collection of events where Tetsuzou Nihei's dog Ryu attacks Shiraishi.
7	"Farewell, Escape King... Episode"; Transliteration: "Sayonara Datsugoku-ō...-hen" (Japanese: さよなら脱獄王･･･。編)	May 29, 2018
Asirpa tries to teach Shiraishi to hunt, without success.
8	"Forest Friends Odorigui Episode"; Transliteration: "Mori no Nakama o Odorigui-hen" (Japanese: 森の仲間を踊り食い♪編)	June 5, 2018
Asirpa dreams of dancing squirrels and the lead dancer removes its scalp to reveal its delicious brain.
9	"Kazuo Henmi Episode"; Transliteration: "Kazuo Henmi-hen" (Japanese: 辺見和雄編)	June 12, 2018
Serial killer, Kazuo Henmi, introduces Sugimoto to ways that he could be killed, using a meat mincer or being chopped by a two-man hand guillotine.
10	"Kamuy LOL Episode"; Transliteration: "Kamui Daibakushō-hen" (Japanese: カムイ大爆笑編)	June 19, 2018
A singing dance sequence about the missing gold with Shiraishi, Sugimoto, Ushiyama, Kiroranke, Inkarmat and Asirpa.
11	"Seal Episode"; Transliteration: "Azarashi-hen" (Japanese: アザラシ編)	June 26, 2018
Asirpa goes seal hunting.

=== Season 2 (2018) ===
No.	Title	Original release date
12	"Watching... Episode"; Transliteration: "Miteru...-hen" (Japanese: 見てる...編)	October 9, 2018
13	"Excerpt from Edogai-kuuun's "Fake Human Skin" Production Diary Episode"; Transliteration: "Edogai-kuuun no "Nisemono ninpi" seisaku nikki yori bassui-hen" (Japanese: 江渡貝くぅぅんの"偽物人皮"制作日記より抜粋編)	October 16, 2018
14	"Woodcock's love fortune telling Episode"; Transliteration: "Yamashigi no koi uranai-hen" (Japanese: ヤマシギの恋占い編)	October 23, 2018
15	"Wait, Shiroishi Episode"; Transliteration: "Mattero Shiraishi-hen" (Japanese: 待ってろ白石編)	October 30, 2018
16	"Screeching Episode"; Transliteration: "Ukī-hen" (Japanese: ウキーッ編)	November 6, 2018
17	"Sey-pirakka Episode"; Transliteration: "Seipirakka-hen" (Japanese: セイピラッカ編)	November 13, 2018
18	"Ezo Pika Episode"; Transliteration: "Ezo naki usagi-hen" (Japanese: エゾナキウサギ編)	November 20, 2018
19	"Kushiro Matagi Fortitude Episode"; Transliteration: "Kushiro Matagi ryojō-hen" (Japanese: 釧路マタギ旅情編)	November 27, 2018
20	"Can you say it properly? Episode"; Transliteration: "Kichinto ieru ka nā?-hen" (Japanese: きちんと言えるかなぁ？編)	December 4, 2018
21	"Toot Episode"; Transliteration: "Ppyuu-hen" (Japanese: ッピュウ☆編)	December 11, 2018
22	"Two Little Moles Episode"; Transliteration: "Futari no hokuro-kun-hen" (Japanese: ふたりのホクロ君編)	December 18, 2018

=== Season 3 (2020) ===
No.	Title	Original release date
23	"Chikapashi Episode"; Transliteration: "Chikapashi-hen" (Japanese: チカパシ編)	October 6, 2020
24	"Showdown of the century Episode"; Transliteration: "Seiki no taiketsu-hen" (Japanese: 世紀の対決編)	October 13, 2020
25	"Are you tired? Episode"; Transliteration: "Tsukareta ka?-hen" (Japanese: 疲れたか？編)	October 20, 2020
26	"Barrel-rolling Episode"; Transliteration: "Tarai mawashi-hen" (Japanese: たらい回し編)	October 27, 2020
OVA	"Orca Tatsuta-age Episode"; Transliteration: "Shachi no tatsuta-hen" (Japanese: 鯱(しゃち)の竜田揚げ編)	January 29, 2021
27	"Haaa! Cold Episode"; Transliteration: "Hā attsumetai-hen" (Japanese: ハアアッ冷たいッ編)	November 3, 2020
28	"Roller skates Episode"; Transliteration: "Rōrāsukēto-hen" (Japanese: ローラースケート編)	November 10, 2020
29	"Lighthouse Episode"; Transliteration: "Tōdai-hen" (Japanese: 燈台編)	November 17, 2020
30	"Shiraishi on a dolphin Episode"; Transliteration: "Iruka ni notta Shiraishi-hen" (Japanese: イルカにのった白石編)	November 24, 2020
OVA	"Appasionata Episode"; Transliteration: "Netsujō-hen" (Japanese: 熱情編)	February 26, 2021
31	"It's a dog Episode"; Transliteration: "Inudaro-hen" (Japanese: イ犬だろ編)	December 1, 2020
32	"Suddenly from under the ice Episode"; Transliteration: "Kōri no shita kara hyokkori-san-hen" (Japanese: 氷の下からひょっこりさん。編)	December 8, 2020
33	"We came by dogs Episode"; Transliteration: "Inu de kita.-Hen" (Japanese: イヌで来た。編)	December 15, 2020
OVA	"Monster river Episode"; Transliteration: "Bakemono gawa-hen" (Japanese: ばけもの川編)	March 26, 2021

=== Season 4 (2022–23) ===
No.	Title	Original release date
34	"Ready, set! Episode"; Transliteration: "Se no! Hen" (Japanese: せーのっ！ 編)	October 3, 2022
35	"Running Along the Center of the Lake Episode"; Transliteration: "Mizuumi no chūshin de tsuppashiru-hen" (Japanese: 湖の中心で突っ走る編)	October 11, 2022
36	"Five Seconds Before Emerging in a Cocoon Episode"; Transliteration: "Mayu de uka suru 5-byō mae-hen" (Japanese: MayuでUkaする5秒前ッ！ 編)	October 18, 2022
37	"Your Ball. Episode"; Transliteration: "Kimi no tama-hen" (Japanese: 君の玉。編)	October 25, 2022
OVA	"Angels of the Drift Ice Episode"; Transliteration: "Ryūhyō no tenshi-hen" (Japanese: 流氷の天使編)	July 26, 2023
38	"Grandma's mouth chewing dango Episode"; Transliteration: "Obachan no kuchikami dango-hen" (Japanese: お婆ちゃんの口噛み団子編)	May 2, 2023
39	"The world is wide!! Episode"; Transliteration: "Sekai wa hiroi!!-hen" (Japanese: 世界は広い!! 編)	May 9, 2023
40	"Asirpa's clione Episode"; Transliteration: "Asirpa no Kurione-hen" (Japanese: アシㇼパの天使(クリオネ)編)	May 16, 2023
41	"The brown bear man is coming Episode"; Transliteration: "Higuma otoko ga yattekuru hen" (Japanese: ヒグマ男がやってくる編)	May 22, 2023
OVA	"Retatcir Episode"; Transliteration: "Retacchiri-hen" (Japanese: レタッチㇼ編)	August 30, 2023
42	"Today's fortune Episode"; Transliteration: "Kyō no unsei-hen" (Japanese: 今日の運勢編)	May 30, 2023
43	"Nikaidō get well again Episode"; Transliteration: "Nikaidō genki ni naru-hen" (Japanese: 二階堂 元気になる編)	June 6, 2023
44	"Fukujusō Episode"; Transliteration: "Fukujusō-hen" (Japanese: フクジュソウ編)	June 13, 2023
45	"Shoot and stop! Episode"; Transliteration: "Uchite shi yama mu! Hen" (Japanese: 撃ちてし止まむ！ 編)	June 20, 2023
46	"Menko Episode"; Transliteration: "Menko-hen" (Japanese: メンコ編)	June 27, 2023
OVA	"Retatcir Episode 2"; Transliteration: "Retacchiri-hen 2" (Japanese: レタッチㇼ編②)	September 27, 2023
