= World's Funniest Videos =

- Title sequence; the background accompanying the title logo was sampled from America’s Funniest Home Videos' 1990–96 opening sequence.
- Genre: Clip show; Comedy
- Created by: Vin Di Bona
- Written by: Larry Arnstein; Lane Sarasohn; David Wechter
- Directed by: Eytan Keller
- Presented by: Dave Coulier; Eva LaRue
- Announcer: Gary Owens
- Theme music composer: Dan Slider; Bobby Sandstrom
- Opening theme: "The Whole World's Watchin' You", performed by Rick Friedman
- Country of origin: United States
- Original language: English
- No. of seasons: 1
- No. of episodes: 21

Production
- Executive producers: Vin Di Bona; Eytan Keller; Richard C. Brustein
- Producer: Terry Moore
- Production locations: Epcot, Walt Disney World, Bay Lake, Florida
- Camera setup: Videotape; Multi-camera; (hosted segments)
- Running time: 22–24 minutes
- Production companies: Vin Di Bona Productions; Media Arts Management, Inc.; Greengrass Productions

Original release
- Network: ABC
- Release: February 1 – June 20, 1996

Related
- America's Funniest Home Videos; America's Funniest People; Videos After Dark; America's Funniest Home Videos: Animal Edition

World's Funniest Videos is an American comedic reality video clip television series that aired on ABC on February 1 to June 20, 1996. A spinoff of America’s Funniest Home Videos (1989–present), it is the shortest-lived offshoot of the long-running clip compilation series, airing as a midseason replacement during the 1995–96 season. Hosted by Dave Coulier and Eva LaRue, the series was produced by Vin Di Bona Productions, in conjunction with Media Arts Management, Inc. and Greengrass Productions (a subsidiary of then-ABC parent Capital Cities/ABC, which was in the process of being acquired by The Walt Disney Company at the time the series debuted).

== Synopsis ==
The series consisted of humorous home videos sent in from around the world similar to the ones shown on America's Funniest Home Videos and its first spinoff America's Funniest People, the latter of which also was co-hosted by Coulier. Videos showcased on the program usually consisted of humorous home videos—featuring unintentional physical comedy involving people and animals getting into humorous accidents or engaging in amusing behavior, and humorous moments involving pets or children displaying interesting talents—and practical jokes submitted from around the world, including clips originally featured on the international versions of AFHV airing at the time (such as ITV [U.K.]’s You've Been Framed!, TF1 [France]’s Vidéo Gag and Nine Network’s Australia's Funniest Home Video Show). The series also featured staged practical jokes originally featured in the Just Kidding VHS prank compilation series (which were presented under license from its distributor, Multimedia Group of Canada), and featured a recurring segment that originated on AFHV, "Assignment America", which called on viewers to submit videos pertaining to a specific theme or subject.

As Bob Saget (who co-starred with Coulier in the 1987–95 ABC sitcom Full House) had done on Funniest Home Videos and Coulier had done to a lesser extent on Funniest People, Coulier—an accomplished impressionist and voice actor—along with fellow voice actors Connie Cook and Bob Buchholz provided voiceovers for many of the clips. Unlike AFHV, however, the series did not contain a grand-prize contest element, and viewer-submitted videos were not rewarded with prizes.

== Series overview ==
Season	Episodes	Originally released		Rank	Rating
Season	Episodes	First released	Last released	Rank	Rating
1	21	February 1, 1996	June 20, 1996	#90	7.4 (Note: Tied with Before They Were Stars and Dateline Sunday.)

== Production and broadcast ==
The program's studio segments were taped on location in front of a studio audience at Walt Disney World within Epcot’s World Showcase attraction; episodes were taped at the various pavilions in the attraction space, including the Germany, Morocco, Italy and United Kingdom areas. Contestants could submit their videos by sending them via mail to a Hollywood, California post-office box address.

Although Funniest Home Videos had maintained a half-hour format at the time, ABC decided against pairing it with World's Funniest Videos in the Sunday 7:00 p.m. (Eastern Time) hour, as AFHV had been performing well in the 7:30 slot since the network added a second airing of the show in January 1995; (Note: The expansion of AFHV occurred as a result of the network’s decision to put the short-lived sitcom On Our Own, which had been underperforming in the lead-out 7:30 slot, on hiatus in December 1994. The sitcom would later move to Fridays, as part of the TGIF lineup, in March 1995; On Our Own was ultimately cancelled after one season.) instead, it was paired with Before They Were Stars (a series adapted from the 1994–95 ABC specials) on Thursday nights, airing opposite the first hour of NBC's "Must See TV" sitcom lineup and directly against the highly-rated Friends as well as the CBS mystery-drama Murder, She Wrote (then in its twelfth and final season, having suffered a drastic drop in viewership upon moving from Sundays to Thursdays for the 1995–96 season) and the Fox sitcom Living Single. World’s Funniest Videos regularly underperformed in the ratings, usually placing a distant third among the network shows during the 8:00 p.m. ET slot. ABC officially cancelled the series in May 1996, after only one season.

== Syndication ==
Repeat episodes of World’s Funniest Videos aired on TBS from 1998 to 2000, airing concurrently with reruns of the 1989–94 Saget-era episodes of America’s Funniest Home Videos and America’s Funniest People. As with the channel’s broadcasts of Funniest People, the series typically aired as overnight filler programming when movie presentations were scheduled to conclude before the start of the regular daily schedule.
