= America's Super Showcase =

ABC television special

America's Super Showcase was a one-time variety special that aired on ABC on April 5, 1992, as a crossover episode on "America's Funniest People". The special opened as the latter show, then host Kevin Meaney joined Dave Coulier and Arleen Sorkin on the stage and introduced the show.

== Segments ==
The Rhino Records band Big Daddy was the house band.

The first segment featured magician/comedian The Amazing Johnathan who demonstrated many comedy props, such as the Mole In The Back routine and then picked a random audience member and engaged him in a question round and if he won, he would receive a $100 bill (which was actually a $20 bill).

The second segment featured a juggling trio called The Flaming Idiots in which they juggled bowling pins and then did an act called "Human Juggling".

Also included were a European comedy team called "Lacawski and Siegel" who would slap their chests to the tune of the William Tell Overture; a Ventriloquist Lynn Tuxster performed an act with three audience members; Prop comedians Carrot Top and Mike Bent performed comedy skits; and Kevin Meaney closed the show by lip-synching "We Are The World" and imitating the singers who originally participated in the song.

== Background ==
The show was executive produced by Vin Di Bona. Additional episodes were taped but never aired.

== Reception ==
The special received a negative review from Warren Gerds of the Green Bay Press-Gazette.
