= Australia's Funniest Home Videos =

- AFHV title screen (2009–2014)
- Also known as: Graham Kennedy's Funniest Home Video Show (1990); Australia's Funniest Home Video Show (1991–2004)
- Genre: Variety
- Based on: Fun TV with Kato-chan and Ken-chan America's Funniest Home Videos by Vin Di Bona
- Presented by: Shelley Craft (2008–2014); (see hosts)
- Voices of: Vic Davies (1990)
- Narrated by: Steve Britten (1990); Danny McMaster (1991–1999); Ken Sterling (2000); Dave Gibson (2001–2014)
- Theme music composer: Neil Sutherland (2000–2014)
- Opening theme: 'The Funny Things You Do' (1991–2004)
- Country of origin: Australia
- Original language: English
- No. of seasons: 25
- No. of episodes: 900+

Production
- Executive producer: Kris Noble (1990–1999)
- Production locations: Brisbane, Queensland (1990–1991); Sydney, New South Wales (1992–1999, 2005–2014); Melbourne, Victoria (2000–2004)
- Running time: 30 minutes (1990–2003, 2014); 60 minutes (2004–2013)
- Production company: Taffner Ramsay Productions

Original release
- Network: Nine Network
- Release: 29 March 1990 – 8 February 2014

Related
- America's Funniest Home Videos; America's Funniest People; New Zealand's Funniest Home Videos; You've Been Framed!; Australia's Naughtiest Home Videos

Australia's Funniest Home Videos (AFHV, also known as Funniest Home Videos or simply The Video Show, originally Graham Kennedy's Funniest Home Video Show in its first season and Australia's Funniest Home Video Show until 2004) is an Australian television show on the Nine Network that presented home videos sent in by viewers. It was the Australian counterpart of America's Funniest Home Videos, which was also created by Vin Di Bona.

The show was broadcast from 29 March 1990 until 8 February 2014. Although Nine did not officially cancel the show, in 2015 they stated that they had no plans to produce new episodes.

== Synopsis ==
The show is similar in content to You've Been Framed! and America's Funniest Home Videos, which was also created by Vin Di Bona (which was based on Tokyo Broadcasting System's Fun TV with Kato-chan and Ken-chan). The videos frequently feature slapstick and lowbrow humour such as people tripping over or animals behaving in amusing ways. Most videos are overdubbed with a voice-over and sound effects. In a deal with various foreign producers of similar shows, some imported clips are used, in exchange for home-grown videos from Australia.

Each new Australian video shown on the programme received $500. At the end of each episode the audience watching at home can choose their favourite video of the night from a selection of 4, via telephone and SMS voting, with the winning clip receiving $10,000. At the end of each year, winning clips compete in a semi-final and grand final, where in the most recent seasons third place received a home theatre package, second place received a prize package worth around $100,000 (typically with two or three cars), while the winner received $250,000 in cash (although in 2012 the winner received $150,000) and the title of "Australia's Funniest Home Video".

In 2005, the show received a major revamp with a new set, logo and theme music, leaving behind the original internationally recognised look of America's Funniest Home Videos for a "futuristic" design with a brighter and more open set. Since then, the set has received both minor and major alterations, but still retains a bright and open appearance.

For most of the show's life, it has been a half-hour program broadcast on Tuesday at 7.30 pm. In mid 2000 the show moved to 6.30 pm Saturday, and in 2004, was extended to one hour. In 2013, the show switched from its regular seasonal broadcast to a "summer season" of repeats to allow for broadcasting of The Voice Australia. In 2014, the show returned to its original half-hour format and aired on Saturday at 7.00 pm.

=== Theme music ===
From 1991 to 2004 the theme song was a cover version of "The Funny Things You Do" by Dan Slider from the show's American counterpart with the word "America" replaced by "Australia" and the line "You're the red, white and blue" changed to "You're the dinky-di true blue". It was slightly rearranged in 1994 (with vocals from then-host Jo Beth Taylor, which remained after her 1997 departure). In line with the new season in 2000, the show received a refresh in updated video graphics, set recolouring and a brand new theme song with vocals provided by Australian session singer and songwriter, Marty Cobcroft, in a rock-based arrangement. Sydney musician, Andy Payne, provided additional backing vocals. From 2005 onwards, original compositions were used as the theme music.

The theme song served as the show's intro and played before and after each commercial break. Until 2001 the theme song can be heard during the closing credits.

== Presenters ==
=== Hosts ===
Presenter	Duration
Graham Kennedy	29 March 1990–15 November 1990
Jacki MacDonald	1991
Lisa Patrick	1992
Jo Beth Taylor	13 February 1993–October 1997
Catriona Rowntree	October 1997–November 1997
Kim Kilbey	1998–2002
Toni Pearen	2003–2007
Shelley Craft	2008–2014

=== Co-hosts ===
Presenter	Duration
Cori Hopper	January 2004–December 2004

== Special episodes ==
On 19 November 1991, a special international edition of the show hosted by Jacki MacDonald with special guests hosts from versions of the show around the world via video link featuring Bob Saget (America's Funniest Home Videos), Kerry Smith (New Zealand's Funniest Home Videos), Linda de Mol & Billy Hotdog (De Leukste Thuis), Frank Dingenen (Videodinges), Bernard Montiel & Alexandre Debanne (Video Gag), Fausto Silva (Video Cassetadas), Mike Carl and Gundis Zambo (Bitte Lächeln). The episode also includes imported clips from each country featured.

On 28 February 1995, the show celebrated its 200th episode hosted by Jo Beth Taylor during an hour-long special which featured special guest appearances from America's Funniest Home Videos host at the time Bob Saget, Bernard Montiel & Alexandre Debanne from Video Gag via video message, as well as video messages from casts and hosts of other programs on the Nine Network congratulating the show's milestone. The shows anniversary special featured bloopers of former hosts Graham Kennedy, Jacki MacDonald & Lisa Patrick, also including The Channel Nine Marching Band conducted by Geoff Harvey performing the shows theme song in between each segment before and after the breaks.

In the summer of 1999, the show celebrated its 10th birthday, hosted by Kim Kilbey and featuring special guest Frank Bennett, to perform his single "Beautiful People" alongside the Sydney Children's Choir, who sang a special arrangement of the show's theme song along with Jo Beth Taylor. The show's anniversary special included a timeline of hosts; bloopers; fashion (of the female hosts); and interviews of former hosts Graham Kennedy, Jacki MacDonald, Lisa Patrick, Jo Beth Taylor, and Catriona Rowntree. This was also the last episode before moving to the Melbourne network and the inception of a new style for the following season in 2000.

On 31 December 2003, the show celebrated its 14th birthday, which included segments "As The Camera Rolls", where Toni is wearing a feather scarf and Bridge (Richard Wilkins) is wearing a pirate eye patch, an appearance by John Burgess of Burgo's Catch Phrase and videos from past grand final winners. Other features includes host bloopers, the introduction of the "Taped Crusader" character, and a videotaped message from former host Catriona Rowntree who paid homage to inaugural presenter Graham Kennedy. The 14th birthday special concluded with Mercury4 performing their hit single "Get Me Some" at the end of the show.

On 4 April 2009, it celebrated its 20th birthday; some of the features included the timeline of the openings, fashion (all female hosts), and additional features.

On 16 April 2011, the show celebrated its '21st' birthday and featured giveaways from JVC, timeline of the hosts, celebratory messages from Avril Lavigne, Short Stack, Alexis Jordan, Shane Warne and former host Kim Kilbey. Other features includes appearances by Julie Goodwin, Justice Crew, the cast of Hi-5 and a special visit from former host Toni Pearen. During the show Shelley Craft paid tribute to honour inaugural presenter Graham Kennedy who died in 2005. The '21st' birthday special concluded with Justice Crew performing their song 'Friday to Sunday' at the end of the show.

== Spin-offs ==
=== Australia's Funniest Home Videos: Daily Edition ===
Australia's Funniest Home Videos: Daily Edition (also known simply as The Daily Edition) is a spin-off to Australia's Funniest Home Videos which first aired on the Nine Network from 30 November 2009 to December 2010 and later aired on GO! from 2011. It was a brief 30-minute version of the full show that would broadcast selected clips from the original show, and was hosted by then-current host of the original series Shelley Craft. The show was later cancelled in late 2012.

=== Australia's Funniest Home Videos: World's Funniest Videos ===
Australia's Funniest Home Videos: World's Funniest Videos (also known as AFHV: World's Funniest Videos) is a spin-off to Australia's Funniest Home Videos which first aired on the Nine Network from 7 April 2009. The 30-minute show features clips predominately from the American version of Funniest Home Videos, and was hosted by former Australian rules footballer, Shane Crawford and former MTV Australia video jockey, Lyndsey Rodrigues. The show was later cancelled after its third episode on 21 April 2009.

Episodes:

#	Airdate	Timeslot	Ratings (Note: Overall national viewers, numbers in brackets indicate nightly ratings position.)
Series 1 (2009)
1	7 April 2009	Tuesday 8:00 pm – 8:30 pm	1,038,000 (15th)
2	14 April 2009	Tuesday 7:30 pm – 8:00 pm	1,046,000 (15th)
3	21 April 2009	Tuesday 7:30 pm – 8:00 pm	899,000 (19th)
Average series one ratings			994,333

=== Australia's Naughtiest Home Videos ===
Australia's Naughtiest Home Videos is a controversial one-off special spin-off to Australia's Funniest Home Videos which aired on the Nine Network on 3 September 1992. It was a highly explicit special, depicting videos of sexual situations and other sexually explicit content, and was hosted by Australian radio personality Doug Mulray. It was planned to be a 60-minute broadcast, but due to complaints from both viewers and then-owner on the Nine Network Kerry Packer, was taken off the air part-way through the first and only episode, making it the only Australian television series to have done so. A copy of the full episode was later located at the Nine Network in 2008, after which the episode was edited to comply with new television standards and re-broadcast with commentary from Bert Newton at 8:30 PM on 28 August 2008, one week short of sixteen years after the original special, and at the same airing time.

== See also ==
- List of longest-running Australian television series
- List of Australian television series
- List of Nine Network programs
