= America's Funniest Home Videos =

American video clip television series

- Genre: Clip show; Comedy
- Created by: Vin Di Bona
- Based on: Fun TV with Kato-chan and Ken-chan
- Directed by: Vin Di Bona; Other directors: Ron de Moraes; Steve Hirsen; Rob Katz; E. C. Pauling; Averill Perry; Russ Reinsel
- Presented by: Bob Saget; John Fugelsang; Daisy Fuentes; Richard Kind; D. L. Hughley; Mike Kasem; Kerri Kasem; Stuart Scott; Steve Carell; Tom Bergeron; Alfonso Ribeiro
- Announcer: Ernie Anderson; Charlie O'Donnell; Gary Owens; Jess Harnell
- Theme music composer: Dan Slider (music); Jill Colucci and Stewart Harris (lyrics, 1989–1997 version)
- Opening theme: "The Funny Things You Do", performed by Jill Colucci (1989–1997); Peter Hix & Terry Wood (1997)
- Country of origin: United States
- Original language: English
- No. of seasons: 37
- No. of episodes: 844

Production
- Executive producers: Vin Di Bona; Michele Nasraway; Todd Thicke
- Producers: Bill Barlow; Steve Paskay; Henry Kimmel; Gary Grossman; Barbara Bernstein; Chris Cusack; Michele Nasraway; Tom Bergeron; Richard Connor; Tomika Palmer-Ciaccio; Mike Palleschi; Erik Lohla; Sharon Arnett
- Production locations: Hollywood Center Studios, Hollywood, California (1989, 1993–1996); ABC Television Center, Hollywood, California (1989–1993, 1996–1997); Manhattan Beach Studios, Manhattan Beach, California (1997–present)
- Camera setup: Videotape; Multi-camera; (studio segments)
- Running time: 22 minutes (1990–1999; internationally: 2001–present); 44 minutes (1989, 1999–2000 specials; U.S./Canada airings: 2001–present)
- Production companies: Vin Di Bona Productions; ABC Productions (1989–2000); ABC Entertainment (2001–present)

Original release
- Network: ABC
- Release: November 26, 1989 – present

Related
- America's Funniest People; World's Funniest Videos; El Diablito (from XHDRBZ); Videos After Dark; America's Funniest Home Videos: Animal Edition

America's Funniest Home Videos, also called America's Funniest Videos (AFV), (Note: The series is alternatively abbreviated as AFHV, which was occasionally used as shorthand parlance during the program’s first eight seasons.) is an American comedic reality video clip television series that premiered on ABC on November 26, 1989. Created by Vin Di Bona and based on a recurring segment on the 1986–1992 Tokyo Broadcasting System variety show Kato-chan Ken-chan Gokigen TV (English: Fun TV with Kato-chan and Ken-chan), the program showcases humorous home videos—most commonly featuring unintentional physical comedy, amusing behavior from pets and children, and staged practical jokes—that are submitted by viewers. Since the show’s debut, it has broadcast a total of 844 episodes over 37 non-consecutive seasons, with a two-year break in production of weekly episodes from 1999 to 2001, during which three standalone television specials (among the five overall that have been made for broadcast) were produced. It is the longest-running prime time entertainment program, and the second longest-running entertainment program overall (behind the daytime soap opera General Hospital, which premiered in April 1963) in ABC’s history as a television network. The program is a co-production of Vin Di Bona Productions, which was acquired by V10 Entertainment in January 2023, and ABC Entertainment (originally a joint production with ABC Productions from 1989 to 2000).

Originally airing during the Thanksgiving weekend of 1989 as a one-hour prime time special, America's Funniest Home Videos debuted as a weekly half-hour series on January 14, 1990. The program, which placed in the Nielsen Top 20 during its first three seasons, was originally hosted by Bob Saget for both the 1989 special and the first eight seasons of the series incarnation. After Saget stepped down in May 1997, John Fugelsang and Daisy Fuentes took over as co-hosts for the ninth and tenth seasons; lackluster reception to the new host pairing and multiple timeslot changes during that period—after the show was displaced from its longtime Sunday night slot for the 1997–1998 season—caused a significant decline in viewership that led ABC to discontinue AFV as a regular series following the tenth season in 1999. (Regular episodes continued to be produced in the form of a standalone season for selected international markets, hosted by Mike and Kerri Kasem, that premiered in September 1999.) After being relegated to occasional televised and direct-to-video specials presented mostly by guest hosts (including D. L. Hughley, Richard Kind and Steve Carell) through early 2001, ABC brought the program back as a weekly series—expanded to one hour—on Friday nights in July 2001, with Tom Bergeron taking over hosting duties; to date, Bergeron is the longest-serving host in the show's history, having emceed AFV for fifteen seasons until he stepped down in May 2015. Since the premiere of its 26th season in October 2015, the program has been hosted by Alfonso Ribeiro.

AFV has spawned a number of direct spinoffs—including America's Funniest People (1990–1994), World's Funniest Videos (1996), and America's Funniest Home Videos: Animal Edition (2021–2022)—as well as companion series that have repackaged videos from the show’s clip library, and licensed its format to broadcasters globally for their own local adaptations (including Australia's Funniest Home Videos and You’ve Been Framed); it also inspired a range of clip-based television programs showcasing comical and/or extraordinary moments captured on camera (including I Witness Video, Real TV, The World's Funniest!, World's Wildest Police Videos, Tosh.0 and Ridiculousness) that have been broadcast by various American and international broadcasters since the 1990s, a program format that has continued in varying forms into the modern Internet video age due to its largely inexpensive production structure. During the early 1990s, several American television stations (including some that were not even affiliated with ABC) also developed locally produced spinoff programs or special newscast feature segments that were inspired by the series, featuring videos submitted by local residents. The program is credited as a forerunner to the user-generated viral videos presently available to a global audience through social media platforms like YouTube, TikTok, Facebook and Instagram, and has itself, since launching its YouTube channel in 2011, adapted to the rise of user-generated online content, maintaining various official channels on each of the major social platforms that distribute clips of home videos and host segments from its extensive archive.

== Premise ==
America's Funniest Home Videos is based on Kato-chan Ken-chan Gokigen TV ("Fun TV with Kato-chan and Ken-chan"), (Note: Credited in the basis notation shown at the end of each AFV episode as "Fun with Kato-chan and Ken-chan".) a Japanese variety program broadcast by the Tokyo Broadcasting System from 1986 to 1992, which featured satirical pieces about contemporary Japanese society and comedic vignettes. The program also featured a recurring segment showcasing humorous homemade video clips, developed amid a boom in home camcorder usage in Japan during the 1980s and as camcorders were similarly growing in use among North American consumers, in which viewers were invited to send in their home movies to be featured in the segment. Although Gokigen TV is no longer in production, ABC, which holds a 50% ownership share in the program, pays a royalty fee to TBS Holdings, Inc. for the use of the format. The majority of the video clips shown on AFV are short (5–30 seconds) and organized according to topics mentioned in the host's monologues. Videos usually feature people and animals getting into humorous accidents or behaving amusingly on camera, while others include clever marriage proposals, mishaps during weddings and parties, people and animals displaying interesting talents (such as pets that sound like they speak certain words or phrases, or toddlers with the ability to name all past U.S. presidents), children making comedic observations, and practical jokes.

Since the 1989 pilot special, each episode includes “music montages,” a series of short clips accompanied by a popular song connected to the montage’s theme (e.g., clips of people involved in humorous accidents set to the 1959 Isley Brothers single “Shout”). (Note: This single was featured in the montage shown in show #110 (aired on April 8, 1990).) Until its original run as a half-hour series ended in 1999, a single montage was featured per episode, drawing from songs released from the 1950s to the 1990s and occasional instrumental tracks (usually classical music); since its hour-long expansion at the start of Tom Bergeron’s tenure in 2001, two music montages are usually featured per episode (outside of special expanded episodes, such as the Bergeron-era “Grand Prize Spectacular” season finale episodes and the Season 16 “Music Montage Countdown” special), which have gradually incorporated more recent singles (usually songs released between one and 20 years prior to the episode’s original airdate) in the episode’s first montage and often feature an instrumental track in the second montage. From its inception as a weekly program, the series has also included a regular call-to-action segment, "Assignment America”. Presented in the “B” block of each episode during the Saget and Fugelsang/Fuentes runs and the penultimate “E” block since the Bergeron run, the segment invites viewers to submit videos related to a specific theme, challenge, or prompt (such as birthdays, celebrity impressions and lookalikes, science experiments, or Halloween-themed videos). Both segments have also been incorporated into each of the show’s spinoffs, America's Funniest People, World's Funniest Videos and America's Funniest Home Videos: Animal Edition.

Contestants can submit their videos by uploading them on the show's official website, AFV.com; through its iOS or Android apps; on the show's official Facebook fan page; or by sending them via mail to a Hollywood, California post-office box address. As of 1989, the show's production process featured a group of screeners viewing the submitted tapes and grading them on a 1–10 scale based on how humorous they were. The videos graded the highest were sent to the show's producers, and then to Di Bona and another producer for final approval. Videos that feature staged accidents, people being seriously injured, the abuse of animals and children, or that otherwise do not meet ABC network standards and practices are generally not accepted for broadcast.

Every week, the producers choose three videos to compete in the qualifiers for a prize, with the studio audience voting for the winner. The first-place winner is awarded a $20,000 cash prize (previously $10,000 until Season 32), advancing to the season's semifinals and placed in the running for the $100,000 prize awarded during the middle and near the end of each season (each with its own corresponding eligibility period for the $10,000 winners selected from the block of episodes preceding each $100,000 prize telecast); the runner-up receives $6,000 (previously $3,000) and the third-place video receives $4,000 (previously $2,000). Starting in Season 12 (and awarded annually starting in Season 15), the winners of the $100,000 prize in the semifinals then advance to the grand finals and compete for a vacation prize package supplied by Disney Experiences, and the title of "America's Funniest Home Video".

The program's studio segments are taped in front of a studio audience (although the specials that aired in 1999 and 2000 only featured pre-recorded audience responses, and episodes taped towards the end of Season 30 through Season 32 featured a "virtual" audience presented on set monitors through video conferencing due to local and state crowd restrictions put in place during the COVID-19 pandemic). Audience members are asked to dress in "business casual or nicer". As noted in the disclaimer featured during the closing credits of each episode, most of the videos have been edited for length due to time constraints. In addition, according to the contest plug disclaimers, family members (both immediate or relatives) of employees of Vin Di Bona Productions, ABC, Inc., its corporate parent The Walt Disney Company (and for the substantial majority of Saget's hosting tenure, its legal predecessor, Capital Cities/ABC) and their related subsidiaries are ineligible for the show's contests and prizes.

== Series overview ==
| Season | Host(s) | Episodes | Originally released | | Rank (Note: For the 1994–95 to 1996–97 seasons, when the series aired as a one-hour block comprising two half-hour episodes, rankings listed are cumulatives for the first-run 7:30 p.m. ET broadcasts; ratings for the 7:00 p.m. half-hour—which usually consisted of reruns of previous- or current-season episodes, with first-run episodes airing occasionally in the timeslot—are noted under each season’s rank.) | Avg. viewers (in millions) |
| Season | Host(s) | Episodes | First released | Last released | Rank | Avg. viewers (in millions) |
|---|---|---|---|---|---|---|
| Special | Bob Saget | 1 | November 26, 1989 | | —N/a | 32.8 |
| 1 | Bob Saget | 15 | January 14, 1990 | May 20, 1990 | 5 | 20.9 |
| 2 | Bob Saget | 25 | September 16, 1990 | May 12, 1991 | 12 | 16.5 |
| 3 | Bob Saget | 25 | September 22, 1991 | May 17, 1992 | 20 (Note: Tied with 20/20.) | 14.5 |
| 4 | Bob Saget | 25 | September 20, 1992 | May 16, 1993 | 33 (Note: Tied with Step by Step.) | —N/a |
| 5 | Bob Saget | 22 | September 19, 1993 | May 22, 1994 | 57 (Note: Tied with Sisters and Nurses.) | —N/a |
| 6 | Bob Saget | 23 | September 18, 1994 | May 21, 1995 | 26 (Note: First half-hour (ranked #64 for the season) tied with Married… with Children.) | —N/a |
| 7 | Bob Saget | 22 | September 17, 1995 | May 19, 1996 | 29 (Note: Second half-hour tied with the Tuesday and Wednesday editions of Dateline NBC; first half-hour (ranked #70 for the season) tied with Dave's World and the CBS Wednesday Movie.) | —N/a |
| 8 | Bob Saget | 30 | September 22, 1996 | May 18, 1997 | 71 (Note: Second half-hour tied with The Jeff Foxworthy Show; first half-hour (ranked #98 for the season) tied with Crisis Center.) | —N/a |
| 9 | John Fugelsang & Daisy Fuentes | 36 | November 21, 1997 | October 3, 1998 | 63 | 11.3 |
| 10 | John Fugelsang & Daisy Fuentes | 22 | October 3, 1998 | August 28, 1999 | 109 (Note: Tied with Vengeance Unlimited.) | 7.1 |
| Special | Steve Carell | 1 | Uncensored: July 20, 1999 (VHS and DVD only) | | —N/a | —N/a |
| Foreign | Kerri Kasem & Mike Kasem | 25 | September 17, 1999 (foreign markets only) | —N/a | —N/a | —N/a |
| Special | Richard Kind | 1 | Unwrapped for the Holidays: December 23, 1999 | | —N/a | —N/a |
| Special | D. L. Hughley | 1 | Stupid Cupid: February 12, 2000 | | —N/a | —N/a |
| Special | D. L. Hughley | 1 | A Tribute to Moms: May 13, 2000 | | —N/a | —N/a |
| 11 | Tom Bergeron | 16 | February 3, 2001 | January 25, 2002 | —N/a | —N/a |
| 12 | Tom Bergeron | 15 | February 8, 2002 | May 17, 2002 | 64 (Note: Tied with That '70s Show.) | —N/a |
| 13 | Tom Bergeron | 24 | September 27, 2002 | May 9, 2003 | 57 | 10.0 |
| 14 | Tom Bergeron | 22 | September 28, 2003 | May 23, 2004 | 82 | 8.02 |
| 15 | Tom Bergeron | 22 | September 26, 2004 | May 13, 2005 | 67 | 8.40 |
| 16 | Tom Bergeron | 24 | October 2, 2005 | May 19, 2006 | 64 | 8.91 |
| Special | Stuart Scott | 1 | Sports Edition: June 15, 2006 | | —N/a | —N/a |
| 17 | Tom Bergeron | 26 | October 1, 2006 | May 18, 2007 | 73 | 8.91 |
| 18 | Tom Bergeron | 22 | October 7, 2007 | May 16, 2008 | 86 | 7.83 |
| 19 | Tom Bergeron | 24 | October 5, 2008 | May 15, 2009 | 68 | 7.65 |
| 20 | Tom Bergeron | 24 | October 4, 2009 | May 16, 2010 | 55 | 7.52 |
| 21 | Tom Bergeron | 24 | October 3, 2010 | May 22, 2011 | 66 | 7.22 |
| 22 | Tom Bergeron | 23 | October 2, 2011 | May 20, 2012 | 77 | 6.54 |
| 23 | Tom Bergeron | 22 | October 7, 2012 | May 19, 2013 | 69 | 6.35 |
| 24 | Tom Bergeron | 22 | October 13, 2013 | May 18, 2014 | 75 | 6.24 |
| 25 | Tom Bergeron | 23 | October 12, 2014 | May 17, 2015 | 90 | 6.19 |
| 26 | Alfonso Ribeiro | 22 | October 11, 2015 | May 22, 2016 | 91 | 5.28 |
| 27 | Alfonso Ribeiro | 22 | October 2, 2016 | May 21, 2017 | 81 | 5.27 |
| 28 | Alfonso Ribeiro | 22 | October 8, 2017 | May 20, 2018 | 93 | 5.31 |
| 29 | Alfonso Ribeiro | 22 | September 30, 2018 | May 19, 2019 | 83 | 5.22 |
| 30 | Alfonso Ribeiro | 22 | September 29, 2019 | June 14, 2020 | 64 | 5.65 |
| 31 | Alfonso Ribeiro | 22 | October 18, 2020 | May 23, 2021 | 56 | 5.32 |
| 32 | Alfonso Ribeiro | 22 | October 3, 2021 | May 22, 2022 | 48 | 5.13 |
| 33 | Alfonso Ribeiro | 22 | October 2, 2022 | May 21, 2023 | 49 | 4.64 |
| 34 | Alfonso Ribeiro | 22 | October 1, 2023 | May 19, 2024 | 48 | 4.37 |
| 35 | Alfonso Ribeiro | 22 | September 29, 2024 | May 18, 2025 | TBA | TBA |
| Special | Alfonso Ribeiro; Alyson Hannigan | 1 | America's Funniest People: June 15, 2025 | | —N/a | —N/a |
| 36 | Alfonso Ribeiro | 22 | September 28, 2025 | May 17, 2026 | TBA | TBA |
| 37 | Alfonso Ribeiro | TBA | September 27, 2026 | TBA | TBA | TBA |

== History ==
=== Development ===
Series creator Vin Di Bona had previously developed a similar concept to AFV in Animal Crack-Ups (1987–1990), a celebrity game show that aired primarily as part of ABC's Saturday morning lineup and was based on the Japanese series Wakuwaku Dōbutsu Land (English: Waku Waku Animal World), a game in which contestants answered questions related to funny video clips involving animals (accompanied by narration that anthropomorphized the clips' subjects). Di Bona—who decided to form his eponymous production company following his stint as a line producer on the first season (1985–1986) of the ABC action-adventure series MacGyver—partnered with former CBS News executive Joe Bellon, whose distribution company, Bellon Enterprises (founded after Bellon left CBS in 1985), at the time had been struggling in its efforts to sell the international rights to programming concepts—like Wakuwaku—based on shows originally aired by the Tokyo Broadcasting System (TBS). The two soon developed a pitch for an American version of Wakuwaku, using the licensed animal footage from the program, eventually selling it to ABC.

In the spring of 1989, while Di Bona and his then-wife, Gina, attended the Monte-Carlo Television Festival, the latter passed a booth for a distributor showcasing a segment from the TBS variety program Kato-chan Ken-chan Gokigen TV (English: Fun TV with Kato-chan and Ken-chan), in which hosts Ken Shimura and Cha Kato presented and provided comedic narration over a package of funny caught-on-tape moments sent in by viewers; at the end of each show, audience members voted for their favorite clip among those featured. At Gina's insistence, Di Bona contacted TBS about licensing the rights to the concept.

Di Bona, with Bellon's assistance in acquiring the clips from TBS, put together a presentation reel featuring footage from the Gokigen TV home video segment; ABC executives, immediately after seeing the reel, decided to place an order for the concept that would become America's Funniest Home Videos. (Di Bona has claimed in interviews that the network decided to buy the proposed show four minutes into the pitch.) However, the network intended for it to be a one-off special, unsure that a program showing other people's home movies would work as a weekly series. Di Bona enlisted most of the staff from Animal Crack-Ups—including among others, writer Todd Thicke (whose older brother, actor/host/songwriter Alan Thicke, hosted Crack-Ups in addition to his starring role in the ABC sitcom Growing Pains), producer Steve Paskay, creative consultant Gina Di Bona, coordinating producers Joe and (his son and business partner) Greg Bellon, (Note: Joe Bellon, who retired from Bellon Enterprises in 1993 and died in June 2018, retains a posthumous coordinating producer credit on the program.) and director Ron de Moraes—to work on the pilot special. Di Bona also borrowed the comedic narration style used in Gokigen TV and Wakuwaku, having the host provide voices to both humans and animals featured in the clips as well as exaggerated observational humor. In the run-up to the special's broadcast, during the fall of 1989, Vin Di Bona Productions took out ads in national magazines (such as TV Guide and People) asking people to send in their home videos featuring funny or amazing moments. Around 1,800 tapes were submitted for inclusion in the pilot special.

John Ritter was Vin Di Bona's first choice to host the program, but was unavailable (according to Di Bona, Ritter did not envision the hosting role as fitting in with his shifting career focus from sitcoms to feature films). Los Angeles sports anchor Fred Roggin was also approached to host, but due to his contract negotiations with NBC (and its O&O station KNBC), he was unable to accept. (Roggin would eventually host a similar show of his own, Roggin's Heroes, which aired in syndication from 1991 to 1993.) Di Bona then approached actor/comedian Bob Saget (then starring as Danny Tanner in the ABC sitcom Full House), whom he remembered from the latter's May 1989 guest appearance on The Tonight Show Starring Johnny Carson, impressed by his comedic timing and storytelling during the interview; however, Di Bona was unaware of Saget's existing ABC series role until he was informed by network executives when pitching Saget as host. Saget was initially reluctant to accept, but Di Bona ultimately convinced him to agree to do the gig, believing that it would showcase Saget's general comedic talent, and make him known for that than merely for his role as the cleanliness-obsessed "dorky dad" on Full House.

=== 1989–1997: Bob Saget ===
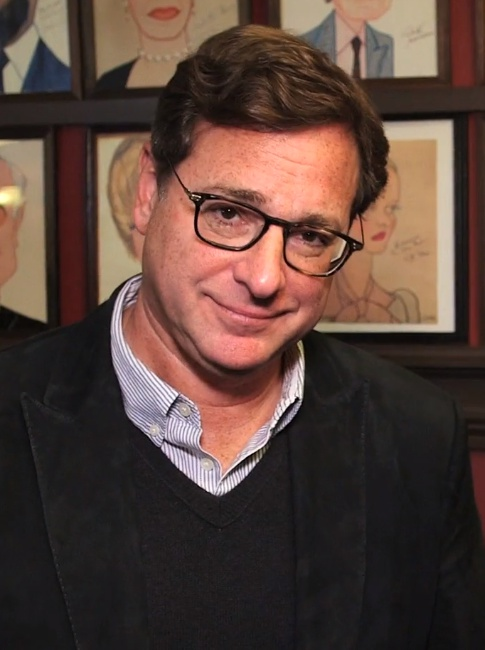
Bob Saget, the show's original host.

The show debuted on November 26, 1989, as an hour-long special, produced by Di Bona and Steve Paskay, with Saget as host. Actress Kellie Martin, then the star of fellow ABC series Life Goes On (as Becca Thatcher), which would serve as the lead-in program to AFHV for the latter show's first four seasons, and A Pup Named Scooby-Doo (as the voice of Daphne Blake), served as a special guest and assisted Saget in hosting two segments during the special, including the announcement of the three grand prize finalists (for the special, the first-place winner was awarded a $5,000 cash prize, while the second and third-place winners each won an RCA camcorder). Married couple Helen and Bill Wholf of Thompson, Ohio were awarded the show's first grand prize for a clip titled "The Dishwasher Lady", in which Bill discovers Helen had gotten herself stuck inside their dishwasher after her hair became entangled in the machine's spray arm while attempting to retrieve a dropped utensil. The clip, the Panasonic OmniMovie HQ 1FX8-CCD camcorder that Bill Wholf used to record the video, and other artifacts from the series—including an annotated pilot script, an audience voting machine, and a presentation reel created to pitch the proposed special to ABC executives—were donated to the Smithsonian Institution's National Museum of American History in 2008.

Original logo used during Saget's tenure as host; a modified version was used for the latter half of Season 8.

America's Funniest Home Videos became an unexpected hit for ABC: the special's initial broadcast was watched by 32.8 million viewers, roughly double the network's average viewership in the Sunday 8:00 p.m. ET timeslot at the time. Ratings increased over the course of the show, with much of it coming from viewers in the Northeastern and Midwestern U.S. snowed in by a significant blizzard that hit those regions a few days earlier around the Thanksgiving holiday. Impressed by the viewer response to the special, ABC decided to turn it into a weekly prime time series and ordered 10 additional half-hour episodes (later increased to 15); it debuted as a regular series on January 14, 1990, serving as a replacement for the recently cancelled fantasy sitcom Free Spirit.

Besides acting as host, Saget also co-wrote his on-set monologues and clip narrations as one of the show’s staff writers, alongside Todd Thicke (who stayed with the series until the 2014–15 season, and also served as a producer starting with its eighth season in 1996) and Robert M. Arnott. Ernie Anderson, the longtime voice of ABC, was the program's original announcer, and made an on-camera cameo appearance during the third season's first grand prize episode, originally aired on November 17, 1991. (An excerpt from that episode—featuring Saget prodding Anderson into reciting the signature vocal delivery he used to promote The Love Boat—was featured in a brief segment paying tribute to Anderson, who died from lung cancer earlier that month, during the February 16, 1997 episode.) Charlie O'Donnell, then known mainly as the announcer for Wheel of Fortune, occasionally substituted for him in select episodes during the first two seasons. Anderson was replaced in 1995 by radio and television actor Gary Owens, who remained in that role until Saget's departure, although archived voice recordings of Anderson would be used briefly afterward. (Owens had previously voiced network promos for the show in his capacity as an ABC promotional announcer starting with the 1991–92 season.)

Originally an instrumental piece for the pilot special, the show's theme song, "The Funny Things You Do", was performed for most of Saget's run by Jill Colucci (who also sang the themes for ABC's "Something's Happening" and "America's Watching" promotional campaigns from 1987 to 1990). Partially inspired by the 1961 Ricky Nelson single "Hello Mary Lou", Colucci—who made a cameo performance of the song in the opening segment of the January 6, 1991 episode—co-wrote the song with Stewart Harris, in collaboration with Dan Slider, who composed the theme’s later revisions and all non-licensed music cues featured on the show since its debut. Midway through Season 8, this version was replaced by a funk rock duet rendition, performed by Peter Hix and Terry Wood, led by an opening vamp inspired by the 1971 Ike & Tina Turner version of "Proud Mary". The set used throughout the Saget era was an open floorplan living room design (originally a papered three-wall design with a bay window for the first three seasons, then redesigned for the 1992–93 season as a translucent-walled flatter frame outline styled after the set’s existing “neighborhood” background, retaining the furniture from the original set), accompanied by two large video screens on either side of the main set.

While he also performed traditional monologue-style narrations for some featured videos, Saget often provided cartoonesque voice-overs of people and animals featured in the videos (as well as people claimed to be off-camera)—accompanied by cartoon sound effects timed to falls and other movements—as a framing device to the clips, a narration style that was carried over to the show’s first two spinoffs, America's Funniest People and World’s Funniest Videos, where Saget's Full House co-star Dave Coulier utilized his skills as an impressionist and voice actor for his clip narrations. Numerous comedy skits were performed on the set during Saget's tenure as host of AFHV. The opening host segment of each episode was tied in with a skit featured in-between the transition from the opening title sequence and Saget's introduction. This usually consisted of several actors in a fake room (usually in the upper part of the audience section or in another soundstage, the setting within it changing each episode) pretending to get excited to watch the show. Sometimes, Saget would visit, attempt to interact with, and pretend to watch the show with the actors (with a pre-recording of Saget appearing on the TV set). These opening gags were scrapped after the fifth season. In Season 5, the show introduced an animated sidekick named "Stretchy McGillicuddy" (voiced by Danny Mann, and dropped after said season), who regularly teased Saget and did other bizarre things; one episode featured Stretchy—who often uttered the catchphrase, "Don't get a little touchy, Bob, I'm just a little stretchy!", in his appearances—appearing on the two large set monitors and Bob had to turn him off with a remote. Saget ended each episode with the tagline, "Keep those cameras safely rolling", followed by a message to his wife who was implied to be watching the show at home (the former was phased out after season 5).

During its first season, America's Funniest Home Videos regularly placed in the Nielsen Top 5 ratings (even temporarily unseating the CBS newsmagazine 60 Minutes as America's most-watched network television series in March 1990), and finished in fifth place among all network programs for the 1989–90 season. For its first four seasons, the series aired on Sunday nights at 8:00 p.m. Eastern Time; when the spin-off premiered in September 1990, AFHV—then entering its second season—was paired with America's Funniest People (following at 8:30 p.m.) to form an hour-long home video block, billed by the network as “America's Funniest Hour”. Beginning with their respective fifth and fourth seasons in September 1993, ABC made America's Funniest Home Videos and America's Funniest People the lead-off programs of its Sunday prime time lineup, moving them both an hour earlier (to 7:00 and 7:30 p.m., respectively) to replace Life Goes On, which ended its four-season run that May; this also gave both shows a formidable rival in 60 Minutes, which had regularly beaten its 7:00 competitors in the ratings since CBS permanently moved the newsmagazine to Sundays in 1975. In May 1994, ABC canceled America's Funniest People after four seasons due to declining ratings, and decided to put the freshman sitcom On Our Own (a co-production of Miller-Boyett Productions and Warner Bros. Television, both of which were also behind Saget's other series, Full House) in its former timeslot for the 1994–95 fall schedule; after On Our Own was put on hiatus that December following an initial run of 13 episodes (it would return as part of the Friday TGIF comedy lineup in March 1995 to complete its abbreviated 20-episode season), the network chose to expand America's Funniest Home Videos to one hour with back-to-back episodes, with that week's new episode occupying the first half-hour, followed by a repeat from a previous season to fill the remaining time, or vice versa.

For Saget's final season on AFHV (1996–97), two new episodes aired back-to-back for several weeks over the course of the season, which increased the episode order that year to 30. Saget himself soon grew tired of the repetitive format and was eager to pursue other projects as a comedian, actor and director. (Saget made his directorial debut in For Hope, a made-for-TV movie based on his older sister Gay’s battle with scleroderma that aired on ABC in November 1996.) Producer Di Bona held him to his contract, resulting in a frustrated Saget listlessly going through the motions, constantly getting out of character and making pointed remarks on the air during his last two seasons. Saget's contract expired in May 1997 and he decided to leave the show in June. However, according to Di Bona, the producers felt a change (and change of hosts) was needed for AFV as a result of ABC going through a change of leadership (longtime parent company Capital Cities/ABC had then recently completed the sale of its assets to current owner The Walt Disney Company). His former Full House castmates—except for Mary-Kate and Ashley Olsen—appeared for the penultimate aired episode of Season 8 (Note: This episode was the 25th episode produced of the 30 for that season.) (airing on May 9, 1997, in a special Friday broadcast as part of ABC's comedy-centered "3D Week" programming stunt), (Note: In addition to this episode, several of Saget's Full House castmates made guest appearances on America's Funniest Home Videos during his concurrent runs on both shows: Dave Coulier and John Stamos previously appeared in the second grand prize episode of Season 3 (show #317; aired on February 16, 1992), Candace Cameron and Scott Weinger appeared in a Season 5 episode (show #520; aired on March 27, 1994), and Mary-Kate and Ashley Olsen made their only AFHV appearance in the first grand prize episode of Season 6 (show #608; aired on November 13, 1994).) preceding Saget's final episode as host, the season-ending $100,000 grand prize episode (aired in its regular slot on May 18). (The two final broadcast Saget episodes (Note: 825 and 830, with 825 being a new version without the 3D gimmicks.) were rebroadcast on September 21, 1997, the day before production commenced on Season 9.)

Saget returned to America's Funniest Home Videos on three different occasions—first, to co-host a 20th anniversary special edition episode alongside then-host Tom Bergeron, which aired on November 29, 2009 (which was three days shy of AFV's actual 20th anniversary date of its premiere on the air on November 26, 1989); a cameo appearance at the end of Bergeron's final episode on May 17, 2015, where he was driving a golf cart and to co-host a 30th anniversary documentary special (AFV: America... This Is You!) alongside Bergeron and current host Ribeiro, which aired on December 8, 2019 (his last appearance prior to his death in early January 2022).

=== 1997–1999: John Fugelsang & Daisy Fuentes ===
Main logo, used from 1997 to 2015

Original version of abbreviated logo, used from 1997 to 2015

After Saget's departure from the series, ABC sidelined America's Funniest Home Videos from the network's 1997–98 fall schedule, as the series prepared a major restructuring of its format with a new set of hosts; in the late fall of 1997, ABC decided to put the series on its Monday lineup as a replacement for the science fiction series Timecop, which had been pulled from the schedule after five episodes due to persistently poor viewership. The first two episodes of the ninth season (Note: Prod No. 907 and 908) aired as a "sneak peek" on November 21, 1997, as part of the TGIF lineup, before the remainder of the season began airing regularly in the show's new Monday slot on January 5, 1998. (Note: The first two to air were prod no. 905 and 906.) This season featured new hosts, an overhauled look (including new full-title and abbreviated logos, which were later modified in Season 15 and partially overhauled in Season 26, and a new set augmented by a balcony-linked, double-flight bent staircase surrounding a large center-stage monitor, ditching the living room set-up used throughout the Saget era), and a new nouveau ska punk instrumental rendition of the "Funny Things You Do" theme song by longtime show composer Dan Slider (similar in composition to the 1997 Mighty Mighty Bosstones single "The Impression That I Get") that remained in use through the show’s 25th season (2014–15)—including the 2000–01 specials and the standalone international season—in addition to being featured in Alfonso Ribeiro's 2015 host audition tape. Although America's Funniest Home Videos remained its official title, from this point since, in most on-air parlance, the show began to be alternately called AFV, abbreviated from the titular shortening (“America's Funniest Videos”) occasionally used in ABC promos and continuity announcements for the show since the 1992–93 season. (Note: Some ABC promotions for the show had shortened its title even further as simply “Funniest Videos”.)

Actor/comedian John Fugelsang and model/television personality Daisy Fuentes (then known for her work as an MTV VJ and host of the network’s fashion newsmagazine show, House of Style) took over as co-hosts of the show. (The two promoted their new roles while co-hosting the Las Vegas performance segments of ABC’s Dick Clark’s New Year’s Rockin’ Eve '98 special six days before AFV's eighth season officially premiered.) Three new writers—among them, Mystery Science Theater 3000 alumni J. Elvis Weinstein (assigned the newly created role of supervising writer) and Trace Beaulieu—joined holdover scribe Thicke on the writing staff, replacing Saget and Arnott. Similar to Saget's narrative delivery of certain video clips during his tenure that did not employ his equally common cartoonish voiceover style, Fugelsang and Fuentes provided humorous narrations of the clips being presented through either observational commentary or by exaggerating specific circumstances for effect in the lead-up to the comedic moment. Owens was succeeded by an unknown announcer, who was subsequently replaced for the tenth season by voice actor Jess Harnell, who still holds this position to this day. New recurring segments were also introduced, including "Bad News, Good News" (a montage of clips involving humorous “bad news” accidents, with one of the hosts quipping about the mishap’s upside after each video), the "AFV Hall of Fame" (in which Fugelsang “honored” the clip being showcased by unveiling a portrait showing the moment of a mishap shown in the preceding clip), and "Who Would You Like to See..." (a “man-on-the-street” segment in which a random interviewee is asked which celebrity—whose headshot photo is posterized over the face of the actual clip subject—they would like to see involved in a random mishap).

With ABC reserving the Sunday 7:00 p.m. ET slot for The Wonderful World of Disney beginning that season (ironically putting the anthology series—which returned to broadcast television after a six-year run on the Disney Channel—directly against Fox's new AFV-inspired series The World's Funniest!), the show changed timeslots several times over the next two seasons: after leading off ABC's Monday night lineup (at 8:00 p.m. ET) for Season 9, the network moved AFV to Saturday nights at the start of Season 10 (1998–99); the show was later moved to Thursday nights in March 1999, opposite the first hour of NBC's "Must See TV" comedy lineup and airing directly against the top-rated Friends. Alongside the 26 episodes ordered for Season 9, ten other episodes were produced with no contest winners and recycled clips from Season 8 with new voiceovers recorded by Fugelsang and Fuentes. These would sporadically air paired with other original episodes back-to-back; the last to air was originally broadcast alongside the Season 10 premiere in October 1998. The ten partially repackaged non-contest episodes have never aired in syndication, and only two of the ten episodes are known to have rerun on ABC. One of the original 26 episodes was produced as the first part to one of the additional ten episodes, and also has never aired in syndication as a result.

The timeslot changes, coupled with less-than-satisfactory reception to the new hosts and accompanying format changes, caused the show’s viewership to suffer during the ninth and tenth seasons. Season 10 saw AFV plunge to a series low, failing to crack the Nielsen Top 100 for the first (and to date, only) time, ranking #109 out of 158 prime time network series for the 1998–99 season. Both Fuentes and Fugelsang left the show at the conclusion of the tenth season, after hosting for only two seasons. Their last original new episode—airing on August 28, 1999, 3½ months after the penultimate first-run episode of Season 10 aired on May 15—was taped at the House of Blues in West Hollywood, California. Until the 2019 special AFV: America... This Is You!, showcasing footage from the tenures of the other AFV hosts, the only honorable mention of Fugelsang and Fuentes and segments showcasing their run was the two-part 300th episode AFV special in November 2003 (during the early years of the Bergeron run). While Fugelsang has not been seen in new recent never-before-seen footage on the road or in-studio on AFV since his and Fuentes' departure, Fuentes was featured in interview segments discussing their time on the show for America... This Is You!, while both Fugelsang and Fuentes conducted further interviews for the America... This Is You! podcast.

=== 1999–2000: Specials ===
Due to the show’s declining ratings, in May 1999, ABC announced that it would discontinue America's Funniest Home Videos as a regular weekly series after its tenth season, but chose to continue the format for the 1999–2000 season in the form of three holiday-themed television specials—the Christmas-themed “Unwrapped for the Holidays” (aired on December 23, 1999), the Valentine’s Day-themed “Stupid Cupid” (aired on February 12, 2000), and the Mother’s Day-themed “A Tribute to Moms” (aired on May 13, 2000)—hosted by ABC sitcom stars D. L. Hughley (of The Hughleys) and Richard Kind (of Spin City). Concurrently, Vin di Bona Productions produced a season intended for selected international markets, with Kerri and Mike Kasem (both children of legendary radio DJ and voice actor Casey Kasem) as hosts.

Three direct-to-video compilation specials were also released on VHS and DVD in the interim—America's Funniest Home Videos Uncensored (released July 20, 1999) and its follow-up Deluxe Uncensored (released June 6, 2000), Animal Antics (released October 12, 1999, and the only release not to include hosted segments), and Family Follies (released June 6, 2000)—in conjunction with distributor Real Entertainment (later Slingshot Entertainment) during this period. The Uncensored releases, the first of which was hosted by Steve Carell and taped on the set used for the ninth and tenth seasons of the original series run, featured somewhat more risqué content—including graphic profanity and rear nudity—than that allowed on the television broadcasts (similar to the format of the 2019 Videos After Dark specials). The international syndicated series and Family Follies VHS/DVD special were taped in a much smaller soundstage on a set that featured various video screens and monitors (resembling iMac computers) placed on shelves. The 1999–2000 international edition and TV and video specials were not taped in front of a live studio audience, with pre-recorded applause and laugh tracks being used during commercial bumpers and just before, during, and after video packages being used instead.

=== 2001–2015: Tom Bergeron ===
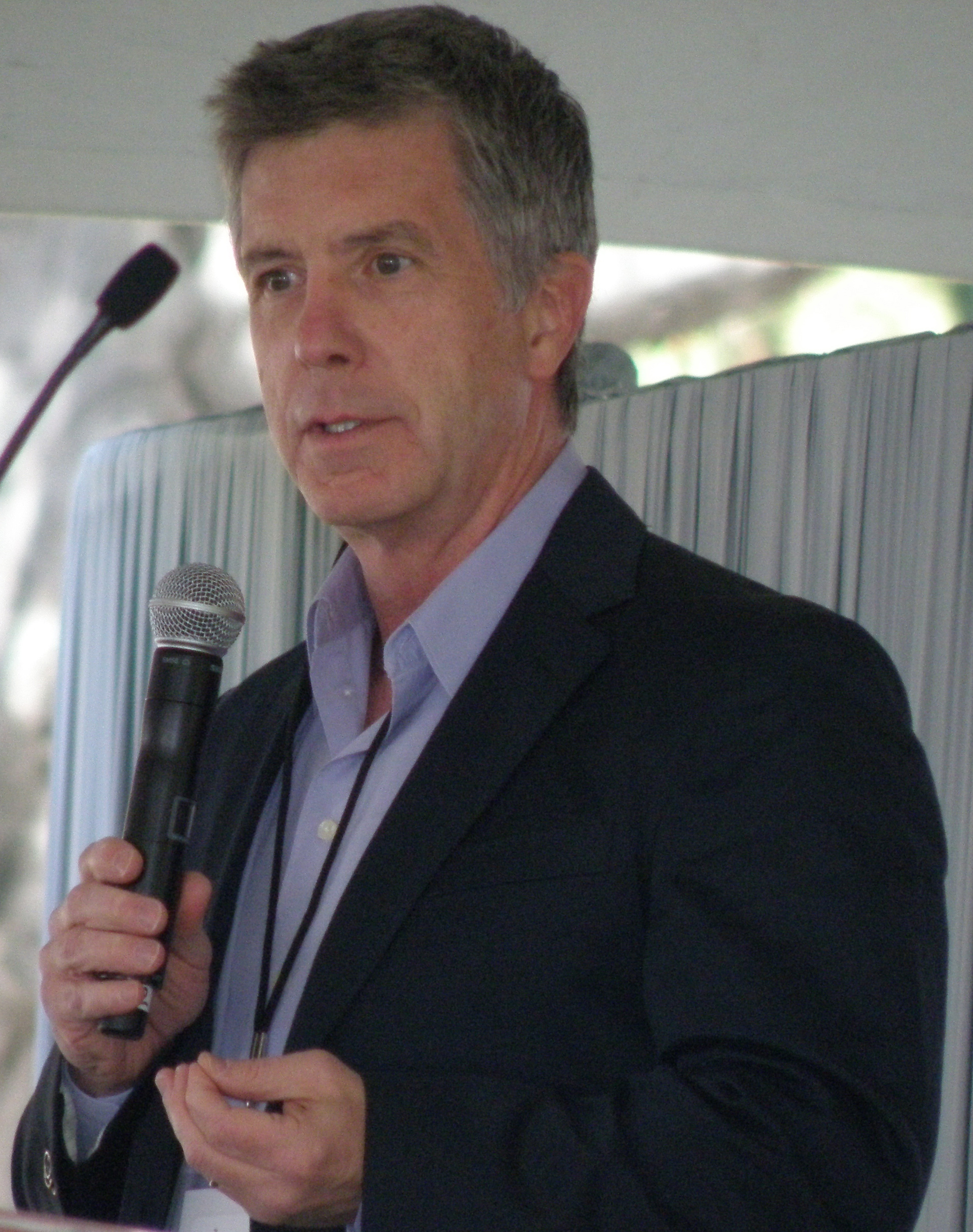
Bergeron in 2009

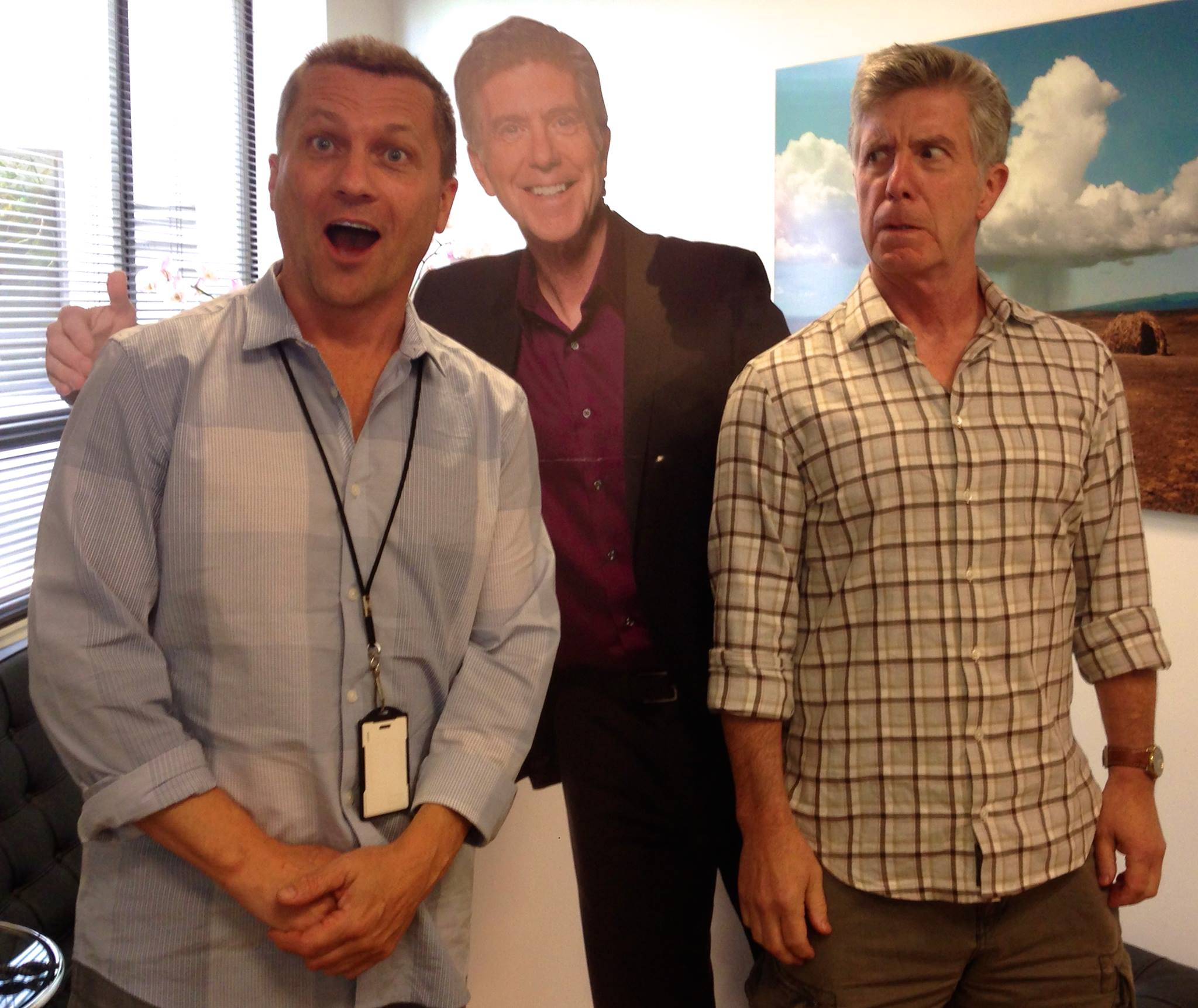
Bergeron and Todd Thicke at the AFV Headquarters

In October 2000, ABC announced that America's Funniest Home Videos would return as a regular weekly series, ordering an eleventh season consisting of 13 episodes. On February 3, 2001, the show returned in its third format, this time with Tom Bergeron (then host of the third syndicated iteration of Hollywood Squares, who had previously hosted the AFV: Family Follies direct-to-video special the year prior) serving as host. The first two episodes of Season 11, “Matrimony Mania” (centering on wedding mishaps) and “Nincompoop-a-rama” (originally aired on March 4, and showcasing humorous accidents and mishaps caused by ill-conceived ideas), were structured in the same themed compilation format as the 1999–2000 specials. Weekly episodes—permanently expanded formally to the one-hour format implemented for the interregnum specials and international season—returned when the remainder of the season officially premiered as a summer filler program on July 20, 2001, airing on Friday nights at 8:00 p.m. ET; a new set—featuring a pillar with several monitors, which first appeared in the “Nincompoop-a-rama” special—was also introduced, along with the resumption of studio audience tapings. Thicke was promoted to supervising writer and co-executive producer, while Weinstein and Beaulieu (who both remained staff writers, with the former promoted to consulting producer for Season 11, through the 20th season [2009–10]) were joined by Mike Palleschi (who succeeded Thicke as head writer for Season 25); Di Bona also began directing most episodes thereafter. The series went on hiatus after the August 31 episode, ahead of the launch of ABC’s 2001–02 Friday fall lineup (which was delayed two weeks by the September 11 attacks), consisting of reality series The Mole II: The Next Betrayal, and dramas Thieves and Once and Again, the former two of which were temporarily replaced with filler specials after poor ratings prompted both shows to be pulled from the schedule. (Note: The Mole II: The Next Betrayal was removed from the Friday schedule in October 2001 after three episodes (airing in its entirety from June to August 2002), while Thieves was cancelled later that month after only eight episodes (out of ten that were produced). Once and Again remained on the schedule before ending its three-season run in April 2002.) AFV returned to the schedule in The Mole's former timeslot (via reruns of the previous season) on November 23, 2001, and began its twelfth season as a midseasion replacement on February 8, 2002.

Similar in style to the voiceovers during the Fugelsang–Fuentes era, Bergeron humorously narrated the clips, though he did lend comedic voiceovers similar to Saget's style to some clips from time to time during the eleventh season. In addition to retaining the Fugelsang/Fuentes-era “Bad News, Good News” bit, new recurring segments introduced during Bergeron’s run included "Tom's Home Movies" (a montage of videos that feature comically enlarged pictures of Bergeron’s head—exhibiting varying facial expressions that match the actual video subject’s reactions—superimposed over the subject’s face), "Vs." (a compilation of two sets of themed videos, closing with a faux "preview" of the videos in which the “winner” is claimed to compete against in the segment’s next edition), "The Dog/Cat Park" (a compilation of animal videos featuring dogs or cats, usually the former), "The Naughty File" (showcasing clips incorporating gross-out behavior, mishaps featuring censored nudity, and other slightly raunchier fare), "Name That Sound" (a compilation segment featuring audio clips of unusual sounds, followed by the source video that revealing the situation in which a person or animal made the noise), and "Nincompoop Corner" (a compilation of videos of people involved in situations exhibiting hilariously bad judgement).

Various audience participation games involving videos submitted to the show—featuring one or two randomly chosen audience members, or occasional celebrity guests, competing to win an AFV compilation DVD, a show-merchandised T-shirt or, from Season 23 (2012–13) onwards, a bobblehead of Bergeron—were also introduced in Season 14, including "Head, Gut, or Groin” (a multiple-choice game in which players must guess whether the person in the video would take a bodily hit in the aforementioned areas), "Pick the Real Video" (a multiple-choice game in which players are asked to choose the actual video based on three descriptions), "What's Behind the Blue Blob" and "Kid, Cat, or Canine" (both involving players guessing the person, animal or object featured in the showcased video). After forgoing a more conventional sign-off during the Fugelsang–Fuentes run, Bergeron resumed the practice of ending each episode with a regular tagline, originally "If you get it on [tape/video], you could get it in cash", later changed to "Upload to us. Get rich, get famous" starting in Season 19 (2008–09).

With ABC moving The Wonderful World of Disney to Saturdays for the 2003–04 season, when the 14th season premiered in September 2003, the show returned to its former Sunday 7:00 p.m. Eastern timeslot, still in its hour-long format (though special episodes occasionally aired on Friday nights until 2007). Changes to the set for that season included the replacement of the round video wall by a curved video wall, the pillars being recolored to blue (sometimes other colors), the addition of curved light borders hanging through the set, and lights under the center stage with return of the abbreviated "AFV" logo. On June 15, 2006, the series aired a standalone sports-themed special, AFV: The Sports Edition, hosted by ESPN anchor Stuart Scott; the special was rebroadcast every New Year's Day through 2010, along with occasional broadcasts before NBA playoff games (with a post 8:30 p.m. ET) tip-off until 2008.

For Season 18 (2007–08), the series began allowing viewers to upload their video submissions online at ABC.com; it would later direct viewers to submit their videos to a new standalone website, AFV.com, beginning with Season 23 (2012–13), in addition to the existing practice of submitting videos via standard mail. In Season 22 (2011–12), AFV released an iOS app on the App Store, allowing Apple mobile device users to record and directly upload videos for submission to the show; a version for Android devices was released the following season.

The final six seasons of Bergeron's run as host fell during two major milestones in the series' history. In 2009, in commemoration of its 20th season, the show started its "Funny Since 1989" campaign and broadcast a special 20th anniversary episode on November 29, featuring a guest appearance by Saget in his return to AFV for the first time since his 1997 departure. Both Saget and Bergeron ended that episode with a pinata party skit and a nod to the Star Wars lightsaber fight scenes during the closing credits (Disney, owner of show co-producer ABC Entertainment and its namesake network, would coincidentally later acquire the franchise through its 2011 purchase of Lucasfilm), with the design of the pinatas resembling the two hosts.

On March 7, 2014, Bergeron announced on his Twitter account that he would step down as host of AFV at the conclusion of its 25th season. The series commemorated its silver anniversary for its 2014–15 season, and broadcast a 25th Anniversary Celebrity Celebration special on February 15, 2015, in which Bergeron and ABC sitcom stars Anthony Anderson, Tracee Ellis Ross (both co-leads of Black-ish) and Cristela Alonzo (of Cristela) recounted memorable videos from the show's history, with one of three nominees from the pool being awarded a Disney Cruise Line vacation grand prize. Bergeron's penultimate episode (the last episode he hosted from the show's soundstage and the final (and season 25's second) $100,000 show of his tenure) aired on May 10, 2015, incorporating periodic montages of funny home videos that defined the show's then-25-year run. His final episode as host, which was also the 25th season finale, aired the following week on May 17; taped on-location at Disneyland for that season's edition of the annual "Grand Prize Spectacular" (which utilized various formats since 2005, and featured one of the two (formerly three) $100,000 winners from the current season winning a vacation package from Walt Disney Parks and Resorts, or in earlier seasons, Adventures by Disney), AFV's 25th anniversary and the Disneyland Resort's 60th Anniversary Diamond Celebration (which began on May 22, 2015) featured an auto-tuned montage of clips and outtakes from Bergeron's run as host and closed with him being escorted after walking off the outdoor stage near Sleeping Beauty Castle following the grand prize presentation on a golf cart driven by Saget in a special cameo appearance. (Bergeron's 15-year run is the longest hosting tenure for the series to date.)

Bergeron would later make an in-studio guest appearance alongside his successor, Alfonso Ribeiro, in the Season 26 "Grand Prize Spectacular" finale (aired on May 22, 2016), in which he played the show's final audience participation game segment ("Who Breaks It?") and won a Ribeiro AFV pillow and socks. He was featured alongside fellow hosts Ribeiro, Saget and Fuentes in the 2019 special AFV: America...This Is You!.

=== 2015–present: Alfonso Ribeiro ===
Orange version of alternative logo, used from 2015 to 2021

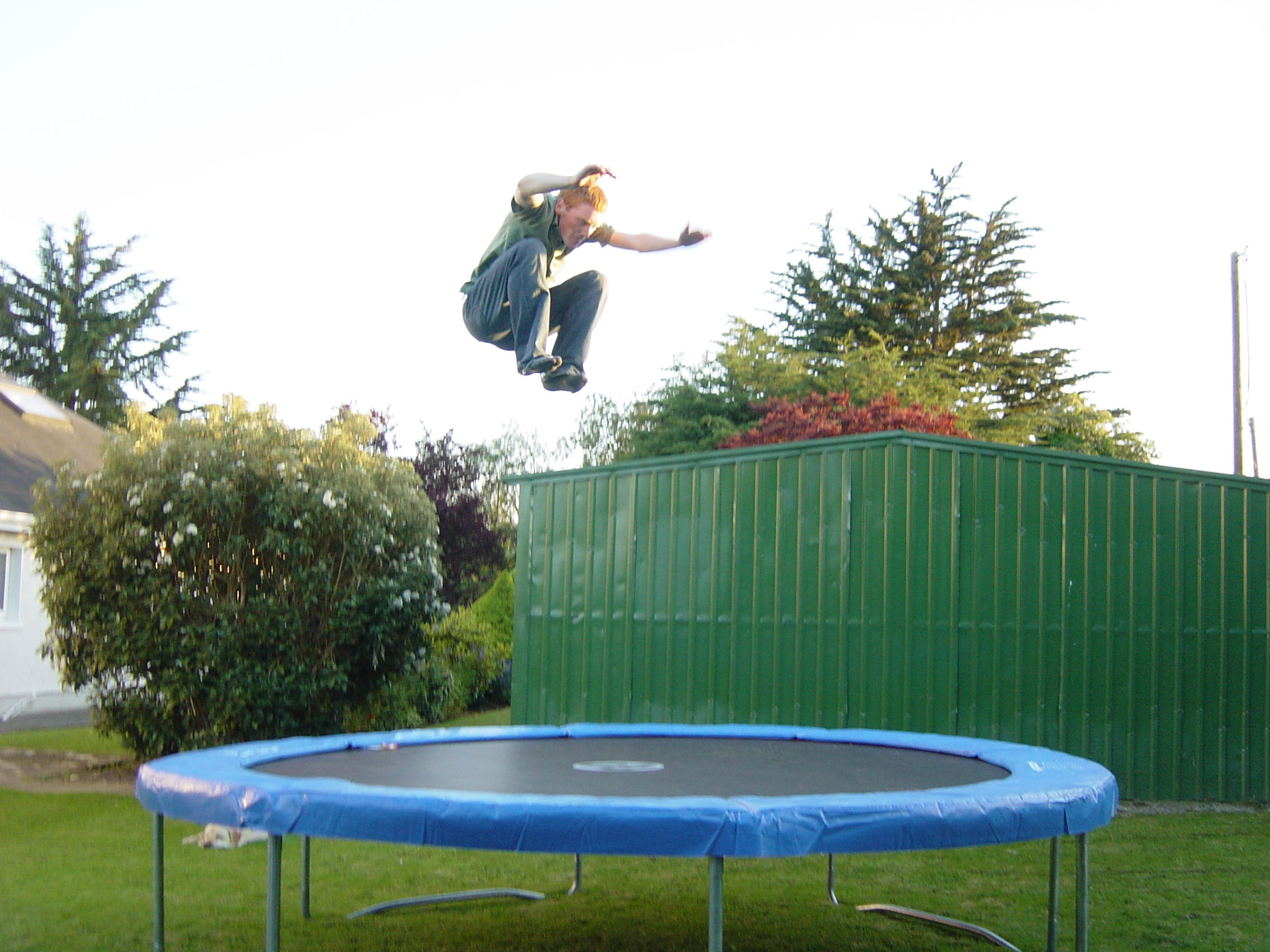
Many of the show's clips feature a trampoline

On May 19, 2015, two days after Bergeron's final episode aired, ABC announced that Alfonso Ribeiro (known for his role as Carlton Banks on The Fresh Prince of Bel-Air) would take over as host of America's Funniest Home Videos starting with its 26th season (premiering on October 11 of that year). Bergeron formally introduced Ribeiro's new role as host during the latter's guest performance on the 20th season finale of Dancing with the Stars. (Ribeiro competed during and won the previous season; coincidentally, as Bergeron had done from the dance competition series' 2005 debut until his 2015 departure from AFV, Ribeiro would later begin co-hosting DWTS, in addition to his existing AFV duties, in 2022.) Prior to becoming host, Ribeiro appeared on the show's March 8, 2015 episode playing an audience participation game (called "Who's Makin' That Racket?") alongside then-host Bergeron.

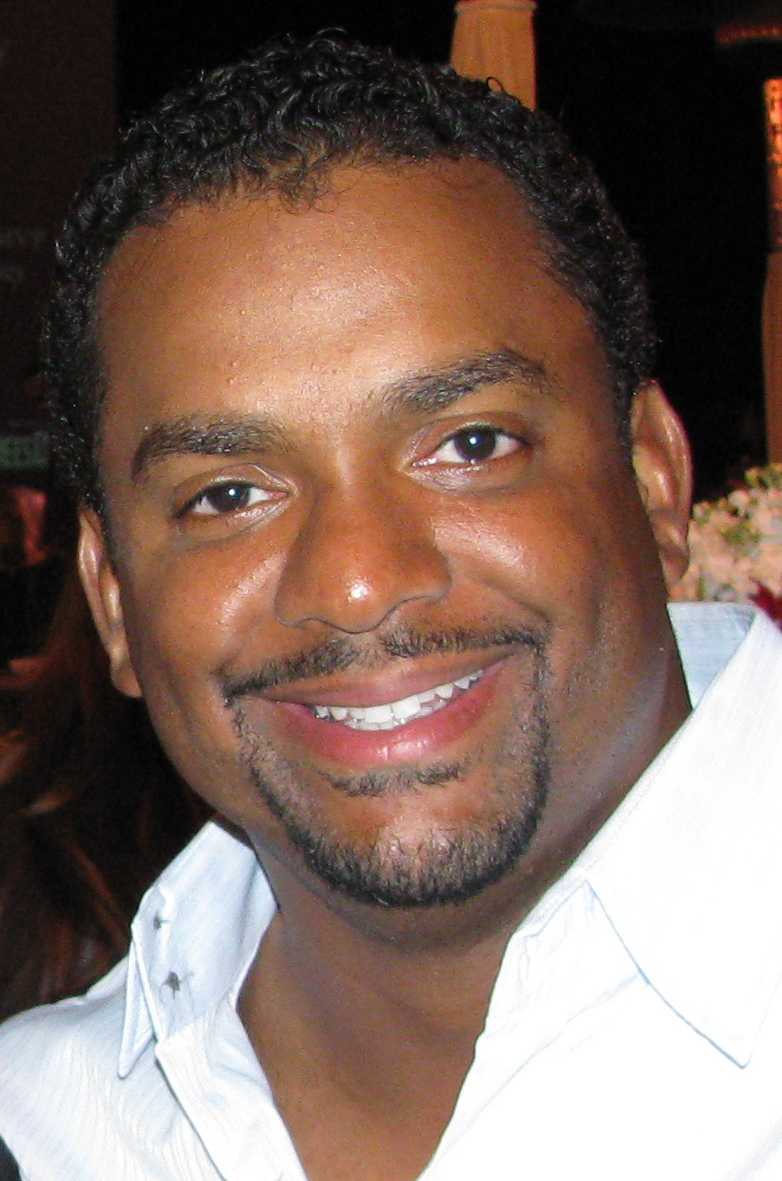
Alfonso Ribeiro, host since 2015.

Ribeiro continued Bergeron's concept of humorously narrating clips, sometimes making extensive use of rhymes in his voiceovers. While some of the Bergeron-era clip segments, the in-studio audience and background parts of the Bergeron-era set props remained intact and/or continued into the first five years of Ribeiro's hosting tenure, the stage was updated to feature a metal floor layout and stairway connected to a puzzle-style cube screen composed of smaller sized flat-panel TV screens, while new segments (developed especially for Ribeiro's run) were incorporated into the show. A new ska jazz instrumental of “The Funny Things You Do”, composed by Dan Slider, was also introduced. Audience participation games introduced during the Bergeron era were eliminated for the 27th season (2016–17). Additional set props such as arrow-styled flat-panel monitors and lit color-changing tables (where selected audience members not assigned to the bleacher areas sit) were added to the AFV set in 2019.

A few Bergeron-era segments ("Vs.", "The Dog/Cat Park", "Name That Sound", and "A Moment With...") continued into Ribiero’s tenure as host, though several new recurring segments were also introduced, including "#TBT: But on a Sunday" (a "Throwback Thursday"-inspired compilation segment featuring clips from show’s archive), "This One Time On AFV" (a clip compilation segment with a fairy tale-inspired narrative framing), "Maybe It's Not Your Thing" (a compilation of clips involving people unsuccessfully attempting various activities or talents), "I Think I See The Problem" (a montage of clips involving people unintentionally finding a way to solve a problem through their mishaps), "Alfonso's Flubs" (a compilation of bloopers from Ribeiro’s in-studio monologue segments), and "Alfonso's Rhyme Time" (a montage of clips framed by rhyming narrations by Ribiero that relate to the clip’s subject matter). Ribeiro continued to use the sign-off tagline that Bergeron introduced in Season 12 until the 29th season (2018–19), when he began ending each episode with the similar catchphrase: "Send your video to me, get yourself on TV".

For its 28th season (premiering on October 8, 2017), AFV was displaced from its longtime 7:00 p.m. ET slot to make room for the reality competition series The Toy Box (which was in its second and final season), resulting in the former being moved to 8:00 p.m. ET. Periodically over the course of three months (between November 26, 2017 and February 4, 2018), the show employed a "repeat/new" episode scheduling format similar to that employed during the later Saget era and intermittently during the Fugelsang/Fuentes era, with new episodes in the 7:00 p.m. hour (occasionally reduced to a single hour block due to holiday movie presentations and specials airing in 8:00 p.m. slot during the holiday season), before permanently returning to the earlier slot on February 11, 2018. On October 29, 2018, ABC renewed AFV for two more seasons, extending the series for its 30th and 31st seasons (premiering on September 29, 2019 and October 18, 2020, respectively). On December 8, 2019 (following a new episode in its regular slot), ABC broadcast AFV: America, This is You!, a retrospective documentary commemorating AFV's 30th anniversary; the special featured appearances by creator/executive producer Vin di Bona and four of the five hosts—Ribeiro, Saget (in his final AFV appearance before his death in January 2022), Fuentes and Bergeron—and chronicled the show's development and pop culture status.

Production was suspended before the completion of the 30th season due to the COVID-19 pandemic; in lieu of its standard "grand prize" season finale format, a quarantine themed special, AFV@Home, aired on May 17, 2020; similar in concept to CBS's AFV-styled The Greatest AtHome Videos (which aired its initial special two days prior) and incorporating hosted segments recorded at Ribeiro's Los Angeles home, the special featured humorous videos submitted to the program and culled from various social media platforms that were filmed mainly during stay-at-home isolation. The series returned to the studio for its 31st season (which premiered on October 18, 2020), however, studio segments utilized a virtual audience—a concept first used for the last three episodes of season 30 prior to the in-studio production shutdown—to comply with federal social distancing guidelines, consisting of audience members appearing and interviews with the grand prize nominees being conducted via videotelephony on the various set monitors.

On January 9, 2022, during the 32nd season (which premiered on October 3, 2021), original host Bob Saget was found dead in his room at a Ritz Carlton hotel near Williamsburg, Florida, a day after his stand-up comedy performance in nearby Orlando. (Saget's death was announced during an ABC News special report that interrupted the end of a new episode airing that night.) The show paid tribute to him in the January 16, 2022 episode, which opened with a dedication to Saget by Alfonso Ribeiro, clips of Saget's tenure as host, and a brief discussion between him and Bergeron from the 2009 20th anniversary special, along with a standard pre-credits dedication; a tribute segment featuring clips from the Saget era was featured in subsequent episodes for the remainder of Season 32.

After two years of using a virtual audience, the 33rd season (which debuted on October 2, 2022) returned to using an in-person studio audience, although nominees for the weekly grand prize contest would continue to appear via remote; the cash amounts for the videos selected for the weekly prize contest were also increased for the first time since AFV's series debut, doubling the first place prize to $20,000 (from $10,000), second place to $6,000 (from $3,000), and third place to $4,000 (from $2,000). Starting with Season 34, in addition to standard hour-long episodes in the show's regular timeslot, ABC began airing edited half-hour versions of AFV episodes from the previous season (repackaged under the umbrella episode title “So Many Laughs, So Little Time”) on selected Sundays during the fall and early winter to fill airtime following Wonderful World of Disney film presentations scheduled to end prior to the conclusion of the network's Sunday lineup. (Although Ribeiro is a SAG-AFTRA member—being exempted from the strike under the separate Network Television Code contract—and co-executive producer/head writer Mike Palleschi and co-writer Erik Lohla are WGA members, the series was not affected by the SAG-AFTRA and Writers Guild of America strikes, the latter having ended four days before Season 34's October 1, 2023 premiere.)

== Seasonal contests ==
=== $100,000 show ===
Near the midpoint and towards the end of each season, the prize winners from the preceding episodes are invited back to compete in a contest for an additional $100,000 prize in the semifinals. (Originally, three $100,000 contests were held per season, each airing after groups of five, six, or seven episodes; however, only one such episode was produced during the first and eleventh seasons due to the shorter length of those seasons.) Two $100,000 contests were held in seasons 9 and 12–14, before adopting that format permanently with the 24th season, each contest episode occurring after a group of nine or ten preceding episodes. The final $100,000 contest of the season originally served as the season finale until the show’s 15th season, when it began airing as the penultimate episode following the creation of the Grand Prize Spectacular contest. Due to the COVID-19 pandemic, the May 2020 edition during Season 31 did not include the traditional confetti, streamers, or live audience; a virtual audience (appearing via telephony over the monitors on-set) was featured instead. A smaller live audience, now seated at tables and not participating in voting for the grand prize winner, returned in Season 33, with the finalists standing on stage in a gated rock stone platform, and the winner was determined by remote video chat. Additionally, starting with this season, the top three $20,000 winners from the $100,000 episode and the two $100,000 winners from the Grand Prize Spectacular contest were allowed to appear on-stage.

==== Voting ====
- 1989–1997 (Saget era): Audience members selected by local ABC owned and affiliated stations around the country (five stations in season one, three from 1989 to 1993, and two from 1993 onward) are joined via satellite to cast their votes along with the Los Angeles studio audience (the final $100,000 show of season two was decided by a telephone vote).
- 1997–present (post-Saget era): Three formats have been used at various times:
1. The Los Angeles studio audience votes to determine the winner.
2. Viewers log onto the show's website to cast their votes.
3. The show declares the winner by going to Disney parks and asking parkgoers, as well as inviting characters like Mickey Mouse, Minnie Mouse, Donald Duck and Goofy, to determine the $100,000 or the grand prize winning clip.

=== Grand Prize Spectacular ===
Beginning in Season 15, at the end of each season, the $100,000 winners from the preceding episodes are brought back to participate in a grand prize contest to determine which video earns the title of "America's Funniest Home Video". The contest usually serves as the season finale episode, except in Seasons 16 and 20, in which it aired as the season’s penultimate episode. Starting in Season 17, it became known as the "Grand Prize Spectacular", though it was known as the "Grand Prize Celebration" for Season 20.

==== Grand prize winners ====
| Season | Year | Title of winning video | Prize package |
| 15 | 2005 (episode: “Disney Dream Vacation”) | “Dog Eat Dog” | $100,000 and free vacations to all 11 Disney theme parks around the world |
| 16 | 2006 (episode: “AFV Goes On Vacation”) | “Dancing Machine” | $100,000 and free vacations to 500+ places for 48 years |
| 17 | 2007 | “Plugged in Pug” | Disney Dream Vacation |
| 18 | 2008 | “Not So Thrilled Ride” | Adventures by Disney vacation to one of 10 places around the world |
| 19 | 2009 | “Birthday Blowout” | $100,000 and free vacations to 500+ places for 50 years |
| 20 | 2010 | “The Great Escape” | Trip to the Walt Disney World Resort with exclusive private time at Magic Kingdom Park |
| 21 | 2011 | “Crying Camera Kid” | Disney Vacation of a lifetime |
| 22 | 2012 | “Recovery Room Rambler” | $100,000 Disney Vacation Club membership for 40 years |
| 23 | 2013 | “Accidental Cup Crime” | Disney Theme Parks and Adventures by Disney vacation package |
| 24 | 2014 | “Mail Slot Menace” | Trip to Disneyland in California and Walt Disney World in Florida |
| 25 | 2015 | “H_{2}O No-No” | Trip to Disneyland for 60 people to celebrate Disneyland's 60th Anniversary Diamond Celebration) |
| 26 | 2016 | “Donkey Delights Lil' Dude” | Trip to the Walt Disney World Resort in Florida and the new Shanghai Disney Resort in China |
| 27 | 2017 | “Sedated and Elated” | Collection of Disney Family Vacations |
| 28 | 2018 | “Sedated Saber Skirmish” | Trip to the Walt Disney World Resort to experience the Toy Story Land park at Disney's Hollywood Studios |
| 29 | 2019 | “Blast with the Laughing Gas” | Trip to the Aulani Disney Resort and Disneyland Paris |
| 30 | 2020 | "'Shallow' Show Stealer” | Adventures by Disney river cruise |
| 31 | 2021 | “Rambling About Ambling” | Disney Cruise Line vacation |
| 32 | 2022 | “Camera Confuses Canines” | Trip to Walt Disney World for 50 people to celebrate Walt Disney World's 50th Anniversary) |
| 33 | 2023 | “The Running of the Bulldog” | Disney Cruise Line vacation to the Bahamas for four people aboard the Disney Wish |
| 34 | 2024 | “Water Bottle Blunder” | Trip to Disney's Riviera Resort, The Villas at Disneyland Resort, or Aulani Disney Vacation Club Villas for eight people |
| 35 | 2025 | “Better Dive Before Sis Arrives” | Trip to Disneyland Resort for eight people to celebrate Disneyland's 70th Anniversary) |
| 36 | 2026 | “Sassy Spouse Squabble” | Disney Cruise Line vacation to the Bahamas for eight people aboard the Disney Wish |
| 37 | 2027 | TBA | TBA |

=== Other contests ===
| Season | Year | Special | Title of winning video | Prize package |
| 12 | 2002 | "Battle of the Best" | “The Quad Squad” | $25,000 and trip to Maui |
| 16 | 2006 | “Top 20 Countdown” | “The Quad Squad” | $250,000 and honor as “The Funniest Video of All Time” |
| 20 | 2010 | “Top 20 Videos that Changed the World” | “The Chainsaw Brothers” | Disney Cruise Line vacation |

== Ratings ==
=== Season averages ===
America's Funniest Home Videos became an instant hit with audiences, with the original special in November 1989 averaging a 17.7 rating and 25 share, finishing at ninth place in the Nielsen ratings that week. When it debuted as a weekly Sunday night series in January 1990, the show averaged an 18.0 rating/27 share, finishing at 16th place. It placed within Nielsen's Top 5 highest-rated weekly series within weeks of its debut; by March 1990, AFHV became the No. 1 primetime series for a short time. AFHV finished the 1989–90 season in the Top 10 most watched shows, with an approximate average of 38 million viewers for each episode. AFHV finished the 2009–10 season in 55th place, with an approximate average of 7.52 million viewers, and finished in 69th in viewers 18–49, with 2.0/6. In 2016, a study by The New York Times of the 50 TV shows with the most Facebook Likes found that "if you could pick a safe show that appeals to almost everyone, this might be it".

== Broadcast format ==
America's Funniest Home Videos Sets over the years. From top to bottom, Top: 1989 Special, 1990–1991. Middle: 1991–1992, 1992–1997, 1997–1999. Bottom: 2001–2003, 2003–2006, 2006–2015, and 2015–present.

Beginning with the show's 21st-season premiere on October 3, 2010, America's Funniest Home Videos began broadcasting in high definition. Many viewer-submitted videos were recorded in standard definition and were subsequently stretched horizontally to fit 16:9 screens. Since the 2012–13 season, videos recorded in 4:3 standard definition are carried in their original format with side pillarboxing. This continued to be the case for videos recorded on mobile devices recorded at a vertical angle. Since the conversion to HD, the series features advisories to viewers to tilt their mobile devices horizontally when recording in order for clip submissions to fit 16:9 screens without reformatting.

In 2014, all Tom Bergeron-era episodes of the show originally produced in standard definition were remastered for widescreen and high-definition broadcast compatibility, which involved cropping and stretching, with certain parts, such as the end credits switching to its original 4:3 aspect ratio after the first few seconds, and production logos, remaining in its original 4:3 aspect ratio. Video clips recorded in standard definition and airing since the show transitioned to HD are also reformatted and stretched for widescreen compatibility. These remasters also have most of their music montages removed, due to music licensing issues. In 2025, coinciding with the launch of the “AFV Classics” streaming channel, most of the Bob Saget episodes received this same treatment, using the original 1995/1998 syndication prints as their basis. These episodes retain their music montages, but because of the expired licenses to the original music and increases in licensing costs for the songs included in the original broadcasts in the time since they first aired, the songs are replaced with AI-generated music. Several episodes are skipped as the music present in the nominees could not easily be removed and/or replaced. Both remasters often have editing mistakes in the conversion to widescreen, and the Saget remasters tend to have video and/or audio damage from the original syndication masters used.

== Syndication ==
America's Funniest Home Videos has been widely syndicated in the United States and selected countries internationally; however, the series has traditionally been split into multiple syndicated packages consisting of individual eras of the program separated by host, rather than as a single package containing its entire library of episodes. Repeats of the series began airing in broadcast syndication on September 11, 1995. The initial off-network syndication package, distributed by MTM Enterprises, consisted of the entirety of Seasons 1–3 and 5, the first 14 episodes of Season 4 and the first eleven episodes of Season 6. In addition to airing on various local broadcast stations, this package aired on cable channels TBS (from October 2, 1995 to September 1997) and USA Network (from 1998 to 2001, primarily airing as part of its “USAM” morning comedy block). 20th Television then assumed syndication rights through then-owner News Corporation’s purchase of MTM Enterprises and other assets of International Family Entertainment (including The Family Channel) in 1997; 20th Television continued to distribute the initial package, and eventually rolled out a new package containing episodes from the remainder of Season 4 and Seasons 6 through 8, which aired on most local stations through September 2001. Hallmark Channel notably aired both packages (making it the only American broadcaster to ever carry the entire Saget run in syndication) from August 5, 2001 to 2002; various other channels carried the new package as well, but most stuck to the initial 5½-season package. Seasons 6–8 aired on ABC Family from January 2005 to September 2007, usually on Tuesday through Saturday mornings, and occasionally on Sunday nights if a late-evening movie presentation was not scheduled to air, being the last to air said seasons.

In 2001, Disney-owned Buena Vista Television (a sister property to ABC and ABC Family) assumed domestic and international distribution rights to AFV; with it, came the release of two revamped syndication packages of the Saget run, individually consisting of Seasons 1–5 and 6–8. Among those that carried the package containing the first five seasons were Pax TV, which aired the show on Monday through Thursday evenings (later expanding to Fridays in 2004) from October 6, 2003 to April 11, 2005, and Nick at Nite briefly from April 30 to October 12, 2007. The Saget era continued to run in local broadcast syndication into the late 2000s, but eventually relegated to weekend timeslots as the Bergeron era entered syndication. This package returned to Hallmark Channel on January 4, 2010; it had acquired the cable rights to all eight seasons of the Saget run, though due to the network constantly changing the show’s timeslot, the show package never got past the tail end of Season 5 before Hallmark removed it from the lineup. The Saget era originally ended its syndication run on February 25, 2010. Internationally, all eight seasons of the Saget run aired on DTV in Russia, TVB Pearl in Hong Kong, and Omni Television’s Toronto sister service OMNI.2 in Canada; the five-season package, meanwhile, aired on other Canadian broadcasters including Sun TV in Toronto, Omni British Columbia in Vancouver and specialty cable channel TVTropolis (now DTour).

The Fugelsang–Fuentes run (seasons 9–10) aired on ABC Family from January 2002 to 2004, and on WGN America from 2006 to 2014, during which the 1999–2001 compilation specials were also occasionally shown on the latter channel. Neither the Fugelsang–Fuentes run nor the standalone specials have ever been distributed in off-network syndication in the United States, while the Kasem siblings-hosted international season has never syndicated in North America. Internationally, both eras aired on various networks, including the international season on TVNorge in Norway, and the Fugelsang–Fuentes run on DTV in Russia.

The Bergeron run began airing on WGN America in September 2004; initially featuring only the episodes from the first four seasons of his host tenure, Seasons 15–19 were gradually added to the WGN cable package as those seasons completed their original runs on ABC. ABC Family began airing Seasons 11–13 in tandem with the Fugelsang–Fuentes seasons throughout 2004. ABC Family later replaced the late-run Saget episodes with the Bergeron package in October 2007, incorporating episodes from Seasons 14–19 as they completed their original runs on ABC; AFV continued to air on ABC Family until August 21, 2014, using the same schedule implemented when it added the Season 6–8 Saget episodes. WGN America, meanwhile, continued airing the show until August 2018. Disney–ABC Domestic Television began distributing Seasons 11–19 in off-network syndication on September 14, 2009, airing mainly on select Fox, MyNetworkTV and The CW affiliates, The CW Plus, and various independent stations until September 2013. The original 2009 package contained 104 select episodes from Seasons 11-18; the entirety of Season 19 and episodes from the preceding seasons that were originally excluded from the package being added on September 12, 2011. These prints occasionally retained time-sensitive information from their original broadcasts, such as sweepstakes information for Disney vacation prizes, which included edited on-screen disclaimers informing viewers that newer entries were no longer being accepted. Some local stations replaced the 2006 Saget package with the Bergeron package.

An updated package featuring cropped 16:9 remasters of the pre-2010 Bergeron-era standard-definition episodes began to be distributed in September 2014, coinciding with the addition of episodes from Season 24 into the package. WGN America ran the remastered Season 11–19 episodes from this package for the remainder of its run on the channel; TBS carried Seasons 18–25 from 2014 to 2016, and Up TV carried Seasons 20–25 from 2016 to December 31, 2019. Digital multicast network Roar (formerly TBD) started airing the 2014 remaster package as part of a special marathon on November 1, 2025, with regular weekday airings commencing on November 3, starting with season 13. Around the same time, V10 Entertainment (which acquired the AFV franchise through its 2023 purchase of Vin Di Bona Productions) launched a free ad-supported streaming television (FAST) streaming channel called "AFV Classics", featuring full episodes from the Saget and Bergeron runs.

Internationally, the post-2001 hour-long episodes are split into two half-hour blocks, with new opening and closing sequences tacked on for each part. All references to the show’s hour-long format are also edited from this package. The edited half-hour package has aired internationally on broadcasters such as RTL Klub in Hungary, TVB Pearl in Hong Kong, DTV in Russia, and PRVA Plus in Serbia. In Canada, the Bergeron run (Seasons 11–25) aired on ABC Spark, CMT, DejaView, YTV and Yes TV in some capacity until 2022. GameTV began airing reruns of seasons 11–19 on September 16, 2023.

The Alfonso Ribeiro seasons (consisting of seasons 26–31) began airing on TeenNick on September 12, 2022; following a six-month sabbatical, AFV returned to the network’s schedule on November 20, 2023. Sister network Nick at Nite re-acquired the rights to the series on February 13, 2024, starting with season 31, and on VH1 on August 3, 2026. The Ribeiro run began airing on the Oprah Winfrey Network on September 29, 2025, incorporating newer seasons not included in the TeenNick package. The Ribeiro run has aired internationally on TVB Pearl and Prva Plus in Serbia (the latter along with the Bergeron years). On December 17, 2025, CBS Media Ventures announced it had acquired the U.S. syndication rights to AFV. The series returned to broadcast syndication for the third time on September 14, 2026, marking the first time it has aired in local syndication in any capacity since 2013 and the first time in which the international half-hour prints have aired in the United States.

Since September 2022, in addition to sister streaming service Hulu offering current-season episodes (with new episodes released the day after their initial broadcast on ABC), Disney+ has offered a three-season rotation of the series, with three newer seasons replacing the previous three in six-month intervals every January and July. In the United Kingdom and Ireland, the show started airing on E4 Extra from July 2026.

== Related series ==
As of 2026, America's Funniest Home Videos has spawned three spinoff programs, America's Funniest People (1990–1994, 2025), World's Funniest Videos (1996) and America's Funniest Home Videos: Animal Edition (2021–2022), as well as a proposed adult-oriented spinoff that aired as a one-off special, Videos After Dark (2019). Vin Di Bona Productions also created two similar comedic home video series that, although not direct spinoffs of the show, largely relied on repackaged clips from the video libraries of companion programs AFV and America's Funniest People: Show Me the Funny (1998–1999, Fox Family Channel) and That's Funny (2004–2006, syndication), both of which were hosted by actor/comedian Rondell Sheridan, with the former originally hosted by comedian Stephanie Miller during its first season.

=== America's Funniest People ===
The success of America's Funniest Home Videos during its debut season quickly led ABC to order a pilot for a spinoff: America's Funniest... Part II aired on May 13, 1990 as a half-hour special that was hosted by Saget's Full House co-star, Dave Coulier (who played Joey Gladstone on the sitcom); as was the case with AFHV following its debut special, ABC immediately picked up America's Funniest... Part II as a weekly series for its 1990–91 fall schedule. Retitled America's Funniest People, it debuted as a series on September 9, 1990, with actress/producer Arleen Sorkin joining Coulier as co-host. (Sorkin was replaced by model Tawny Kitaen for the show's final two seasons.) The series focused on videos featuring people intentionally trying to be funny by doing celebrity impressions, committing pranks, and performing short amateur comedy routines, among other things. Despite changes to the format in its final two seasons (including the inclusion of new recurring segments, episode tapings relocating to Universal Studios Florida for Season 3 before returning to Los Angeles the following season, and the addition of celebrity guest co-hosts for Season 4), ABC canceled the series—retitled The New America's Funniest People to reflect the changes made for its fourth season—in May 1994 after four seasons amid declining ratings, with its final episode airing on June 5 of that year.

A proposed eight-episode revival of America's Funniest People, announced in May 2024 for a potential Summer 2025 debut, aired instead as a one-hour AFV special on June 15, 2025. Co-hosted by Alfonso Ribiero and Alyson Hannigan (who appeared together in 2023 on season 32 of Dancing with the Stars—Ribeiro’s second season as host, during which Hannigan competed and finished in fifth place), the special showcased comedic short-form social media videos featured on platforms like YouTube, TikTok and Instagram, and in-studio performances from comedic acts (similar in concept to the 1993–94 season format). On September 14, 2026, VH1 ordered another revival of America's Funniest People to be produced by V10 Entertainment (which acquired the rights to the format through its 2023 purchase of a controlling interest in Vin Di Bona Productions) and hosted by comedian Ms. Pat; this version will be formatted as a "comedy competition" that will focus on comedic social media content in a similar manner to the 2025 special, and will feature a weekly contest in which three content creators compete for a cash prize. The revival will premiere on November 16, 2026.

=== World's Funniest Videos ===
A second spin-off, World's Funniest Videos, premiered on ABC on February 1, 1996. The series centered on humorous and amazing home videos submitted from around the world, in addition to featuring practical jokes produced for the Canadian-British video compilation series Just Kidding; many of the clips shown that originated from outside of the United States were originally broadcast on the various adaptations of AFHV—including ITV (U.K.)’s You've Been Framed!, TF1 (France)’s Vidéo Gag and Nine Network’s Australia's Funniest Home Video Show—airing internationally at the time. The weekly "Assignment America" segment originated on its parent series was also featured in each episode. Taped at Walt Disney World inside Epcot’s World Showcase exhibition, it was co-hosted by Coulier (who, compared to his run on America’s Funniest People, provided a broader range of comedic impressions and narrations accompanying many of the clips, stylistically similar to Saget’s narrations on AFHV) and actress Eva LaRue (who was playing Dr. Maria Santos on the ABC soap opera All My Children at the time). The series—which was paired with a weekly version of Before They Were Stars, originated as an eight-episode series of specials from 1994 to 1995, on Thursday nights—finished #90 among Nielsen-rated prime time network shows for the 1995–96 season, underperforming opposite NBC’s highly-rated sitcom Friends and stalwart CBS mystery-drama Murder, She Wrote (the latter, also due to it being placed against Friends, saw its ratings decline precipitously with its move to Thursday at the start of the season, forcing its conclusion after twelve seasons); ABC cancelled World's Funniest Videos after only one season in May 1996, with its final episode airing on June 20 of that year.

=== Videos After Dark ===
Originally developed as a weekly series, Videos After Dark aired on ABC as a one-hour special (consisting of two half-hour episodes) on March 12, 2019, promoted by the network as "a special first-look episode" of the proposed 12-episode series. The ten remaining episodes that were produced had been planned to air "later” in 2019; however, these episodes were never broadcast. The special (and unaired episodes) was hosted by original America's Funniest Home Videos host Bob Saget, and featured viewer-submitted clips culled from the Vin Di Bona Productions library featuring profanity and suggestive material intended for adult audiences that were considered to be inappropriate for AFV's more family-oriented target audience.

=== America's Funniest Home Videos: Animal Edition ===
America's Funniest Home Videos: Animal Edition, the fourth offshoot of the franchise and the first direct AFV spinoff to be produced for cable television, premiered on Nat Geo Wild (which was acquired by The Walt Disney Company as part of its 2019 acquisition of 21st Century Fox’s film, and entertainment and nonfiction cable television assets) on June 11, 2021. Hosted by Alfonso Ribeiro (in addition to his existing duties on the parent series), the show featured viewer-submitted videos focusing on animals involved in humorous situations, or displaying interesting talents or abilities caught on camera; animal facts, which often introduced video segments connected to a specific theme or presented as trivia questions bookending commercial breaks, were also incorporated into the show. In each episode, producers and show staff selected their favorite video submission to win a $1,000 prize in a non-tournament exhibition round. The hour-long series ran for two seasons, ending on July 18, 2022.

== International versions ==
AFV has been broadcast around the world from many countries. Here is a list of international versions:

| Country | Network(s) | Aired | Local title |
|---|---|---|---|
| Australia | Nine Network | 1990–2014 | Australia's Funniest Home Videos |
| Belgium | VTM | 1990–2004 | Videodinges |
| Chile | Canal 13 | 1991–2002 | Video loco |
| Czech Republic | Czech Television | 1995–2010 | Tak neváhej a toč! |
| France | TF1 | 1990–2008 | Vidéo Gag |
| Germany | Super RTL | 2005–2018 | Upps! – Die Pannenshow |
| Italy | Canale 5 | 1990–2013 | Paperissima Sprint |
| Netherlands | TROS | 1990–2004 | De Leukste Thuis |
| Netherlands | SBS6 | 2002–present | Lachen om Home Video's |
| Poland | TVP1 | 1994–2009 | Śmiechu warte |
| Spain | TVE1 | 1990–1998 | Videos de Primera |
| Sweden | TV3 | 1991–1997 | Låt kameran gå |
| United Kingdom | ITV | 1990–2022 | You've Been Framed! |

== Other media ==
=== VHS/DVD releases ===
ABC Video, Shout! Factory, and Slingshot Entertainment have released numerous compilation releases of America's Funniest Home Videos on VHS and DVD in Region 1 (North America).

| Title | Release date | Studio | Included Episodes |
|---|---|---|---|
| The Best of America's Funniest Home Videos | June 27, 1991 | ABC Home Video; CBS-Fox Video | Clips from first season with new Bob wraparounds |
| America's Funniest Pets | January 1, 1992 | ABC Home Video; CBS-Fox Video | Clips from second season with new Bob wraparounds |
| America's Funniest Families | January 1, 1992 | ABC Home Video; CBS-Fox Video | Clips from second season with new Bob wraparounds |
| America's Funniest Home Videos: Animal Antics | October 12, 1999 | Slingshot Entertainment | N/A |
| America's Funniest Home Videos: Deluxe Uncensored | June 6, 2000 | Slingshot Entertainment | N/A |
| America's Funniest Home Videos: Family Follies | June 6, 2000 | Slingshot Entertainment | N/A |
| America's Funniest Home Videos: Volume 1 with Tom Bergeron | July 26, 2005 | Shout! Factory | Season 11 Episodes 2, 4–10, 12, 14–16 (2001), The 300th Episode Parts 1 & 2 (Season 14 Episodes 6–7; 2003) |
| America's Funniest Home Videos: Home for the Holidays | October 4, 2005 | Shout! Factory | Season 7 Episode 11 (1995), Season 8 Episode 14 (1996), Season 14 Episode 8 (2003) |
| America's Funniest Home Videos: The Best of Kids & Animals 3-Disc Set: Disc 1 – AFV Looks at Kids & Animals; Disc 2 – All Animal Extravaganza; Disc 3 – Battle of the Best | December 27, 2005 | Shout! Factory | Disc 1 – AFHV Looks at Kids and Animals (Season 7), Season 7 Episode 22 (1996); Disc 2 – All Animal Extravaganza (Season 14 Episode 12), Season 14 Episode 22 (2004); Disc 3 – Battle of the Best (Season 12 Episode 15; 2002) |
| America's Funniest Home Videos: Nincompoops & Boneheads | June 13, 2006 | Shout! Factory | Salute to Boneheads (Season 7; 1996)), Nincompoop-A-Rama (Season 11 Episode 3; 2001) |
| America's Funniest Home Videos: Sports Spectacular | September 12, 2006 | Shout! Factory | Athletic Supporters (Season 12 Episode 1), Season 12 Episode 14 (2002) |
| America's Funniest Home Videos: Love & Marriage | September 12, 2006 | Shout! Factory | Matrimony Mania (Season 11 Episode 1; 2001), Season 12 Episode 8 (2002) |
| America's Funniest Home Videos: Salute to Romance | January 9, 2007 | Shout! Factory | Season 10 Episode 14, Season 10 Episode 22, Stupid Cupid (2000) |
| America's Funniest Home Videos: Motherhood Madness | April 17, 2007 | Shout! Factory | A Tribute to Moms (2000), Season 13 Episode 24 (2003) |
| America's Funniest Home Videos: Guide to Parenting | July 17, 2007 | Shout! Factory | Guide to Parenting (Season 6; 1995), Season 8 Episodes 28 and 29 (1997) |

=== Games ===
Parker Brothers released a board game in 1990. Graphix Zone released a hybrid CD-ROM titled America's Funniest Home Videos: Lights! Camera! InterAction! in 1995. Imagination Games released a DVD game in 2007.

=== Toys ===
An America's Funniest Home Videos micro movie viewer was released in 1990.

== See also ==
- America's Funniest People (1990–1994), people intentionally being humorous, also produced by Vin Di Bona
- Australia's Funniest Home Video Show, 1990–2004 show created by Di Bona
- Australia's Funniest Home Videos, post-2005-2013 show created by Di Bona
- Australia's Naughtiest Home Videos, a 1992 similar show and now-infamous event created by Di Bona
- New Zealand's Funniest Home Videos (1990–1999) (later The Kiwi Video Show)
- Ridiculousness (2011–present), an MTV series using internet videos
- Tosh.0 (2009–2020) a Comedy Central series using internet videos
- That's Funny!
- The Planet's Funniest Animals, an Animal Planet series
- The World's Funniest Moments (2008–present), a syndicated series
- The World's Funniest!, a 1997–2000 series on FOX
- Video Gag (1990–2008), the French equivalent of AFHV
- You've Been Framed! (1990–2022), the British equivalent of the show
- Juoko įvykiai, Lithuanian equivalent of the show
- Video Loco (1991–2002), Chilean equivalent of the show
- Fórky a Vtipky programs in Slovakia on Plus
- Nejzábavnější domácí videa Ameriky, in Czech Republic programs
- Paperissima (1990–2013), Italian equivalent of the show
- Drôle de vidéo, French-Canadian equivalent of the show airing on TVA
- Isto Só Video, Portuguese equivalent of the show
- Сам Себе Режиссёр (1992–2019), Russian equivalent of the show
- Det' Ren Kagemand, Danish equivalent of the show
- Ay, caramba!, Mexican equivalent of the show
- Csíííz! (1998–2001), Hungarian equivalent of the show
- Süper Matrak (2013–2014), Turkish equivalent of the show aired on Disney Channel Turkey
- Tak neváhej a toč! (1995–1999) and Natočto! (1999–present), Czech equivalents of the show
- FailArmy
