= America's Funniest People =

Spin-off to America's Funniest Home Videos

- Also known as: America's Funniest… Part II (1990 pilot special); The New America's Funniest People (season 4)
- Genre: Clip show; Comedy
- Created by: Vin Di Bona
- Directed by: Steven J. Santos; Phil Ramuno; Jeff Goldstein; Amanda Hackney
- Presented by: Dave Coulier (1990–1994); Arleen Sorkin (1990–1992); Tawny Kitaen (1992–1994); Ms. Pat (2026)
- Announcer: Ernie Anderson
- Theme music composer: Dan Slider
- Opening theme: "Lookin' for the Funniest People", performed by Peter Hix
- Country of origin: United States
- Original language: English
- No. of seasons: 4
- No. of episodes: 89 (plus one special)

Production
- Executive producers: Vin Di Bona (1990–1994); Ms. Pat (2026); John Stevens (2026); Carter Sheath (2026); Rick De Oliveira (2026)
- Production locations: ABC Television Center, Hollywood, California (1990–1992); Universal Studios Florida, Orlando, Florida (1992–1993); Hollywood Center Studios, Hollywood, California (1993–1994)
- Camera setup: Videotape; Multi-camera; (studio segments)
- Running time: 22–24 minutes
- Production companies: Vin Di Bona Productions (1990–1994); Gina Communications Corporation, Inc. (1990–1994); ABC Productions (1990–1994); V10 Entertainment (2026)

Original release
- Network: ABC
- Release: May 13, 1990 – June 5, 1994
- Release: June 15, 2025

Related
- America's Funniest Home Videos; World's Funniest Videos; Videos After Dark; America's Funniest Home Videos: Animal Edition

America's Funniest People, abbreviated as AFP and retitled The New America's Funniest People for its fourth season, is an American comedic reality video clip television series that aired on ABC on May 13, 1990 to June 5, 1994. A spinoff of America's Funniest Home Videos. it originally premiered in May 1990 as a half-hour special, America's Funniest... Part II. The green-lit series, given the title America's Funniest People when it was picked up by the network for the 1990–91 fall television season, debuted as a weekly half-hour prime time series on September 9, 1990, which ran for four seasons. Dave Coulier hosted the show’s first four seasons, originally joined by Arleen Sorkin; Tawny Kitaen replaced Sorkin as co-host starting with the show’s third season in 1992.

A revival was announced to be in development for ABC in May 2024, intended for a potential 2025 debut; it instead aired as a single one-hour special episode of America's Funniest Home Videos, co-hosted by Alfonso Ribiero and Alyson Hannigan, on June 15, 2025. In September 2026, VH1 picked up another revival of America's Funniest People to series; hosted by Ms. Pat, it is scheduled to premiere on November 16, 2026.

== Format ==
=== Original series (1990–94) ===
The original series format was similar to America's Funniest Home Videos, with the main difference that while AFHV spent the majority of its time with accidental follies captured on tape, America's Funniest People focused on people intentionally trying to be funny, doing things such as telling jokes, doing impressions, singing, dancing, performing scripted material, attempting wacky stunts, pulling pranks, etc.

Like America's Funniest Home Videos, America's Funniest People featured a contest for funniest video, with the first prize winner receiving $10,000 and the second- and third-place prize winners receiving $3,000 and $2,000 respectively. However, unlike Funniest Home Videos, which relied on studio audience voting to determine the winner, Funniest People selected its winners via telephone vote for its first five episodes, with the winners announced at the beginning of the next show; the show switched to having the studio audience select the winner afterwards, like its parent show. Also, unlike its parent show, there was no $100,000 grand prize finale, therefore having only non-tournament exhibition rounds.

==== Recurring segments ====
===== Jackalope vignettes =====
Originally known as "Tiny the Jackalope", or simply "The Jackalope", Jackalope sketches involved a creature attacking people by playing mean tricks on them (usually as punishment for people who had been mean themselves). Typically, the main target was a muscular man who absolutely despises the creature. The character's catchphrase was, "Fast as fast can be, you'll never catch me!" Host Dave Coulier did the voices for all characters in the Jackalope skits, which were played at a faster pace than other clips. The Jackalope was later renamed "Jack Ching Bada-Bing" in a "Name the Jackalope" contest.

===== “This Old Shack” =====
A series of shorts that center around bumbling, clumsy carpenters, Joe-Bob and Randy-Bob, who use haywire methods to remodel houses. The shorts are a parody of the PBS home improvement program This Old House.

===== Alien Shorts =====
The Alien Shorts feature claymation miniature aliens who attempt to take over planet earth, but are constantly defeated by humankind's daily routines and habits.

===== “Whiz on Wheels” =====
A recurring bit featured parody advertisements for the fictional Whiz on Wheels company, who perform services improperly and too fast to be good, causing more damage than they fix. They claim to be faster and cheaper than competing companies.

===== Miller–Cardwell comedy mini-movies =====
Dennis M. Miller and Jason Cardwell first produced an Indiana Jones spoof for America's Funniest Home Videos called "Pasadena Jones and the Satire of Doom". They then moved over to America's Funniest People for its initial season and produced a dozen videos which aired every other week. Although there were several videos with original characters, there were also spoofs of Rambo, James Bond, and Dirty Harry.

In the Dirty Harry spoof, Harry was downgraded to a video store detective. After chasing a suspect all over San Francisco, Harry finally cornered him in an alley. He reaches into his jacket, and slowly pulls out a VHS movie, asking the suspect "What I have here is a VHS video cassette, the most popular format in the world, and the question is, punk... did you rewind it?"

===== "Dunk Your Parents" =====
For the show's 1993–94 season, a new game show segment called "Dunk Your Parents" was added, hosted by Skip Trippendale (Coulier), in which a kid contestant could drop one of their parents into a pool of water, similar to a dunk tank. The kid chose the parent that they wanted to dunk. That parent then sat on a chair over the water. The parent was then asked a trivia question, usually involving a list — for example, "Name the seven dwarfs in Snow White and the Seven Dwarfs". If the parent answered the question correctly, the other parent had to take their place. If not, that parent remained in the chair. The climax of the segment was when the child pushed a button to release the seat out from underneath the parent, dropping them into the water below.

On some occasions, instead of a question, the parent would have to complete a Beat the Clock-esque stunt (but these were often nearly impossible to complete).

===== "Prank Patrol" =====
When the show changed its format under The New America's Funniest People branding for the 1993–94 season, a new segment was added called the Prank Patrol. Five kids would run around various parks and locations near Los Angeles, performing pranks on unsuspecting visitors. The Prank Patrol consisted of Brady Bluhm, Elena Epps, Raushan Hammond, Lindsay Ridgeway, and Lance Robinson. Pranks consisted of exploding ice cream cones, a man in a gorilla suit, a squirting drinking fountain, a remote control bat, an exploding trash can, and a hand in a jar of candy. Sean Daly was also in this episode

===== "Weird Sports" =====
A recurring segment centering on bizarre sporting events such as Rocky Mountain Rock Fishing, Pizza Diving, Meatball Miniature Golf, Brazilian Bicep Bowling, etc. Actor/comedian Dan Sachoff had hosted this segment in later seasons.

===== "Cool Ways to Scare Your Mom" =====
A recurring segment centering on the comedy duo Schwartz and Chung where Caleb Chung (inventor of the Furby) would teach viewers a simple sight gag and then show it to his mom, played by Gary Schwartz (known for voicing Demoman and Heavy in the video game Team Fortress 2). The segment was first introduced by Full House actress Jodie Sweetin. The reactions were mad, homemade special effects. The duo appeared 11 times in the run of the show.

=== Proposed ABC revival/pilot special (2025) ===
In May 2024, Vin Di Bona Productions and ABC announced that a revival of America's Funniest People was in development. Eight episodes were planned, though the remainder of the proposed episodes were never produced; instead, on June 15, 2025, it aired as an hour-long special episode of America's Funniest Home Videos, intended as a backdoor pilot. The special, which featured videos and in-studio performances (similar in concept to the 1993–94 season format), was co-hosted by Alyson Hannigan and AFV host Alfonso Ribeiro.

=== VH1 revival (2026) ===
On September 14, 2026, VH1 and V10 Entertainment (which acquired a controlling interest in Vin Di Bona Productions in 2023) announced a revival of America's Funniest People had been ordered to series, with comedian Patricia Williams-Lee (under her stage name, Ms. Pat)—whose BET comedy court show, Ms. Pat Settles It, was concurrently renewed for a fourth season at the time of the announcement—as host. (Unlike the original ABC version and the 2025 special/aborted revival, this iteration will not feature a co-host.) This version is described as a "comedy competition", in which each episode will feature "outrageous creator-led content,” involving comedic and practical jokes, stunts and mishaps among other videos; similar to America’s Funniest Home Videos' weekly prize format, the revival will feature three content creators competing head-to-head for a $50,000 cash prize. On October 28, 2026, VH1 announced that the America's Funniest People revival would premiere on November 16, 2026, with two episodes airing back-to-back each Monday (at 9:00 p.m. ET).

== Series overview ==
Series	Season	Episodes	Originally released			Host(s)	Nielsen ranking	Avg. rating share
Series	Season	Episodes	First released	Last released	Network	Host(s)	Nielsen ranking	Avg. rating share
Original series	Special	1	May 13, 1990		ABC	Dave Coulier	—N/a	—N/a
Original series	1	25	September 8, 1990	May 19, 1991	ABC	Dave Coulier & Arleen Sorkin	14 (Note: Tied with Full House.)	16.1
Original series	2	23	September 22, 1991	May 15, 1992	ABC	Dave Coulier & Arleen Sorkin	24	13.8
Original series	3	18	September 20, 1992	March 28, 1993	ABC	Dave Coulier & Tawny Kitaen	41 (Note: Tied with Knots Landing.)	11.5
Original series	4	23	September 18, 1993	June 5, 1994	ABC	Dave Coulier & Tawny Kitaen	70 (Note: Tied with Missing Persons, Angel Falls and George.)	9.2
Cancelled/proposed revival	Special	1	June 15, 2025		ABC	Alfonso Ribeiro & Alyson Hannigan	—N/a	—N/a
Revival series	1	TBA	November 16, 2026	—N/a	VH1	Ms. Pat	—N/a	—N/a

== Production ==
The 30-minute pilot for the series was produced in early May 1990. Hosted by comedian/actor Dave Coulier, the pilot special was titled (and the series originally promoted as) America's Funniest... Part II, as it was developed as a format extension of America's Funniest Home Videos; it aired on May 13, 1990, immediately after the penultimate episode of the parent series’ first season. As with his co-star, Funniest Home Videos host Bob Saget, at the time the series aired, Coulier co-starred as Joey Gladstone (whose character was the best friend of Saget’s character, Danny Tanner) in the popular ABC sitcom Full House. The logo used in the pilot episode was a slightly modified version of the original 1990–97 AFHV logo, accompanied by a monolith-style “Part II” subheader. In future airings, the pilot's title card was retroactively changed to reflect the new permanent name and logo of the show, though a careful viewer would still notice America's Funniest... Part II branding behind the studio audience.

After the pilot proved successful, ABC quickly ordered the series—retitled America's Funniest People—into production for the 1990–91 fall season. For the series, actress Arleen Sorkin (who, at the time, had recently completed her seven-year run playing the eccentric Calliope Jones Bradford on the then-NBC soap opera Days of Our Lives) was hired to co-host alongside Coulier. When it premiered in September 1990, Funniest People was paired on Sunday nights with Funniest Home Videos—then entering its second season and leading off the hour at 8:00 p.m. ET—to form an hour-long home video block, which ABC promoted as “America's Funniest Hour”.

Longtime ABC staff announcer Ernie Anderson, who also served as the announcer for America's Funniest Home Videos, worked in the same capacity on the series. The show’s theme song, “Lookin’ for the Funniest People”, was composed by Dan Slider (who composed the interstitial music for AFHV), and was performed by Peter Hix (who would later perform an updated version of its parent series’ theme, “The Funny Things You Do”, that was used for the second half of Season 8 in 1997). Coulier’s Full House co-stars Mary-Kate and Ashley Olsen (who played Michelle Tanner) made guest appearances, as they also did on America's Funniest Home Videos. The bulk of their visits to Funniest People took place once their collective popularity with kids and pre-teens took off. Their most notable appearance was in the fall of 1992, when they promoted their first single, "Brother for Sale", from the VHS release Mary-Kate and Ashley: Our First Video.

The series was produced by Vin Di Bona Productions, and co-produced through a subsidiary, Gina Communications Corporation (named for Di Bona’s then-wife and production consultant for both Funniest Home Videos and Funniest People, Gina Di Bona), the latter of which was assigned the copyright credited in the byline at the end of the closing credits. The show was originally taped at The Prospect Studios (then known as the ABC Television Center) in Burbank, California, on the same soundstage used for America's Funniest Home Videos at the time. During the back half of the 1991–92 season, five episodes of the show’s second season were taped on-location at the Animal Actors Stage at Universal Studios Florida in Orlando.

In 1992, Sorkin was dismissed by series creator/executive producer Vin Di Bona. In response, Sorkin filed a lawsuit against Di Bona, claiming that she was dismissed from the show due to her race, after ABC Chairman Dan Burke had suggested to Di Bona that Sorkin be replaced by an African-American or a person of another ethnic minority. Sorkin sought $450,000 for lost earnings, and an additional unspecified amount for harm to her professional reputation and emotional injury. Sorkin additionally claimed that after she denounced the move as unfair, Di Bona changed plans and hired Tawny Kitaen, who was white, to succeed her as co-host. Randy Davison was invited to be on multiple episodes, doing impersonations of Edith Bunker and Popeye as Elvis. For the 1992–93 season, the entire production moved to Universal Studios Florida full-time, which required Coulier to commute by plane between Orlando and Los Angeles to shoot both Funniest People and Full House.

With ratings in the midst of a continuing steady decline, for the 1993–94 season, the series’ format was retooled and its title modified to The New America's Funniest People, introducing an updated logo and moving production back to Los Angeles, originating from Hollywood Center Studios. This reflected the addition of new themed segments, some special guests, and the new practice of featuring a guest co-host—including among others, Melissa Joan Hart (then star of Clarissa Explains It All), Thomas Ian Nicholas (promoting his 1993 baseball comedy film Rookie of the Year), and fellow ABC stars such as Andrea Barber of Full House (whom Coulier also co-starred with on the sitcom), and Sasha Mitchell and Christopher Castile of Step by Step (the latter’s appearance also served to promote his 1993 comedy film Beethoven’s 2nd, appearing alongside one of the St. Bernards who played the titular dog in the film)—join Coulier and Kitaen each week. Additionally, as a result of Life Goes On concluding after four seasons in May 1994, ABC decided to move both America's Funniest Home Videos and America's Funniest People back one hour into the family drama’s former timeslot (airing at 7:00 and 7:30 p.m., respectively) to lead-off its Sunday prime time lineup; this had the adverse effect of giving both shows a formidable rival in 60 Minutes, which had regularly beaten its 7:00 competitors in the ratings since CBS permanently moved the newsmagazine to Sundays in 1975. The format changes were not enough to improve the show's falling ratings, which were compounded by the timeslot change, contributing to the series falling out of the Nielsen top-50 (falling from #41 in 1992–93 to #70 in 1993–94); ABC cancelled the show after four seasons in May 1994. The network continued to air repeats of Funniest People on Sunday nights until late August, with its post-AFHV timeslot being filled by the short-lived sitcom On Our Own for the 1994–95 fall schedule in September.

During the latter half of the show's run, and for at most a year after it was canceled, short 30-second interstitials featuring clips from America's Funniest People aired during commercial breaks as part of ABC's Saturday morning lineup. These would usually consist of excerpts from longer segments, usually featuring young kids telling jokes or engaging in stunts. Otherwise, certain elements of the show's premise would later be integrated into America's Funniest Home Videos. In addition, Di Bona later repurposed archived segments and clips originally made for Funniest People for two subsequent video compilation shows produced by his company: the 1998–2000 Fox Family Channel series Show Me the Funny and the 2003–05 syndicated series That’s Funny.

== Syndication ==
Repeat episodes of America's Funniest People aired on TBS from 1998 to 2003, concurring in part with the 1989–94 Saget-era episodes of America’s Funniest Home Videos airing on the cable channel. The series typically aired as overnight filler programming when movie presentations were scheduled to conclude before the start of the regular daily schedule.
