= Videos After Dark =

American video clip television special

- Genre: Clip show Comedy
- Created by: Vin Di Bona
- Presented by: Bob Saget
- Country of origin: United States
- Original language: English
- No. of seasons: 1
- No. of episodes: 2

Production
- Executive producers: Vin Di Bona; Bob Saget; Michele Nasraway
- Production companies: ABC Entertainment; Vin Di Bona Productions

Original release
- Network: ABC
- Release: March 12, 2019

Related
- America's Funniest Home Videos

Videos After Dark is an American video clip television special created by Vin Di Bona, and hosted by Bob Saget on ABC.

The show, which aired on March 12, 2019, was billed as "a special first-look episode" of a series, with 12 more episodes taped which were planned to be broadcast "later in the year", but as of July 2024, the series premiere remains the only airing. The series would have been a spin-off of America's Funniest Home Videos, the first since 1996's short-lived World's Funniest Videos. Saget served as the original host of America's Funniest Home Videos, from 1989 to 1997. Videos After Dark would have featured video clips from Di Bona's "vast video vault that are more appropriate for an older audience".

== See also ==
- Australia's Naughtiest Home Videos
