= America's Funniest Home Videos: Animal Edition =

American video clip television series

- Current version of logo
- Genre: Clip show; Comedy
- Created by: Vin Di Bona
- Based on: Fun TV with Kato-chan and Ken-chan
- Directed by: Rob Katz
- Presented by: Alfonso Ribeiro
- Theme music composer: Dan Slider (music)
- Opening theme: "This Is You” (instrumental theme)
- Country of origin: United States
- Original language: English
- No. of seasons: 2
- No. of episodes: 24

Production
- Executive producers: Vin Di Bona; Richard Connor; Michael O'Rourke
- Producer: R.J. Haynes
- Production locations: Manhattan Beach Studios, Manhattan Beach, California
- Camera setup: Videotape; Multi-camera; (studio segments)
- Running time: 44 minutes
- Production company: FishBowl Worldwide Media

Original release
- Network: Nat Geo Wild
- Release: June 11, 2021 – July 18, 2022

Related
- America's Funniest Home Videos

America's Funniest Home Videos: Animal Edition (abbreviated as AFV Animal Edition) is an American video clip television series that first aired on Nat Geo Wild on June 11, 2021. It is based on the Japanese variety show Fun TV with Kato-chan and Ken-chan and is a spin-off of America's Funniest Home Videos. The show features humorous and wondrous homemade animal videos that are submitted by viewers, from pets to wildlife and everything in-between. It is hosted by Alfonso Ribeiro, who is also the current host of its parent show.

The show is also broadcast on Disney XD.

== Premise ==
AFV Animal Edition is based on the Tokyo Broadcasting System program Fun TV with Kato-chan and Ken-chan, which featured a segment in which viewers were invited to send in video clips from their home movies. As a spin-off, the show's formula is similar to America's Funniest Home Videos. Although a distinct show, contestants can submit their videos to America's Funniest Home Videos from which the show draws on for its animal-related video clips. The majority of the video clips are short (5–30 seconds) and closely related to the segment's theme as introduced and narrated by the host. Videos usually feature animals getting into humorous circumstances caught on camera; while others include animals displaying interesting capabilities or behaviors. The show also features interspersed animal facts, which often introduce connected videos, or are formed as trivia questions to the audience to bookend commercial breaks. For each episode, the producers and staff choose their favorite video submission that wins $1,000 in a non-tournament exhibition round. As noted in the closing credits of each episode, most of the videos have been edited for length due to time constraints.

== Series overview ==
| Season | Host | Episodes | Originally released | |
| Season | Host | Episodes | First released | Last released |
|---|---|---|---|---|
| 1 | Alfonso Ribeiro | 12 | June 11, 2021 | July 2, 2021 |
| 2 | Alfonso Ribeiro | 12 | May 14, 2022 | June 18, 2022 |

== History ==
Green version of alternative logo

The first season broadcast aired three new episodes in a block every Friday night starting at 7pm and premiered to approximately 0.39 million viewers. Disney XD premiered the series on September 18, 2021 with the second and third episodes together, reaching approximately 0.17 million viewers. The first season on Disney XD aired Saturdays at 8pm.

For season two the show moved to back-to-back airings every Saturday night starting at 7 pm, with the season premiere pulling approximately 0.31 million viewers. There was also additional aired content bearing the 'Xtra Laughs' subtitle.

Season 1 was released on October 5, 2021 as a 3-disc DVD set. The show is also available for streaming on Disney+ after each season airs.
