= Vidéo Gag =

French television series

- Genre: Comedy; Reality competition
- Directed by: Geneviève Strina; François Davin; Alexandre Hotton; Didier Froehly; Bernard Flament
- Presented by: Bernard Montiel (1990–2003); Alexandre Debanne (1990–1996); Alexandre Delpérier (1996–2000); Olivia Adriaco (2000–2008); Sébastien Folin (2003–2008)
- Country of origin: France
- Original language: French
- No. of seasons: 18

Production
- Running time: 45 minutes
- Production companies: TVR (1990–1994); Starling (1994–2008)

Original release
- Network: TF1
- Release: 8 July 1990 – 29 June 2008

Vidéo Gag (pronounced vee-day-oh gag) is a French television series that aired weekly on French broadcast channel TF1. It was a French version of America's Funniest Home Videos or the British You've Been Framed!. It used hilarious videos sent in by viewers. Although the videos were primarily French in origin, it also used other videos from other countries on occasion.

Vidéo Gag was last presented by Sebastien Follin and Olivia Adriaco Previously, it was hosted by Bernard Montiel and Alexandre Debanne.
