= Dave Coulier =

American actor (born 1959)

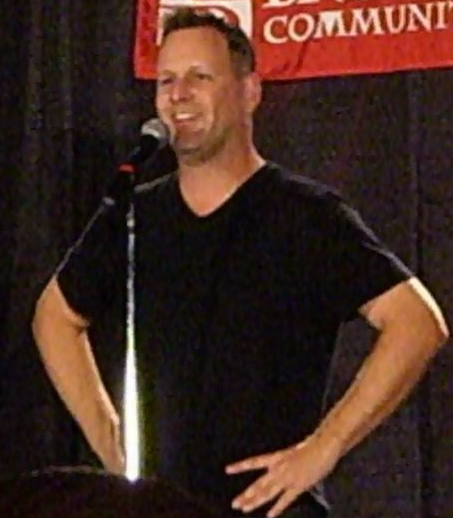
- Coulier in 2010
- Born: September 21, 1959 (age 67); Detroit, Michigan, U.S.
- Occupations: Actor; stand-up comedian; impressionist
- Years active: 1979–present
- Spouses: Jayne Modean (m. 1990; div. 1992); Melissa Bring (m. 2014)
- Children: 1
- Website: www.davecoulier.tv

David Alan Coulier (/kuːlˈjeɪ/ kool-YAY; born September 21, 1959) is an American actor and comedian. He is best known for his roles as Joey Gladstone on the ABC sitcom Full House, Peter Venkman on The Real Ghostbusters, and Animal and Bunsen Honeydew on Muppet Babies. He was also in the 2007 Christmas movie The Family Holiday.

== Early life ==
David Alan Coulier was born on September 21, 1959, to David L. Coulier and Arlen Coulier in Detroit, Michigan, and was raised Catholic in nearby St. Clair Shores. He has three siblings. His mother's side of the family is from Bathurst, New Brunswick, Canada, and his paternal grandmother was a Jewish immigrant from Germany.

Coulier got his start in stand-up comedy in high school by impersonating his principal and other staff over his high school's public-address system. He graduated in 1977 from Notre Dame High School in Harper Woods, Michigan, where he was a member of the varsity ice hockey team, playing defense alongside future NHL player John Blum. Coulier also attended high school with Mark Cendrowski, who became friends with him in the third grade and they often made 8mm films together during high school.

Coulier attended the University of Michigan but dropped out after his freshman year to pursue comedy full time.

== Career ==
Coulier met future Full House co-star Bob Saget for the first time at a comedy club in Detroit. The two became good friends and Coulier briefly lived with Saget and his then-wife Sherri on their couch in the early 1980s as he struggled to get his career started. At age 19, he moved to Los Angeles, California and began performing at The Comedy Store, alongside other comedians including Jay Leno, David Letterman, Jerry Seinfeld, and Robin Williams.

Coulier was initially cast as a player for Saturday Night Live ahead of the show's 1986 season. However, shortly before the season started, he was let go as producers determined he was too similar to another cast member, Dana Carvey.

Coulier has done extensive voice work for shows including Scooby and Scrappy-Doo, The Real Ghostbusters, Slimer! and the Real Ghostbusters (taking over the character of Peter Venkman after Lorenzo Music's departure from the role), Extreme Ghostbusters, Muppet Babies after Howie Mandel left (Baby Animal, Baby Bunsen, Bean Bunny, and Uncle Statler and Waldorf, and a preteen Janice for one episode), The Jetsons, Rude Dog and the Dweebs, and Detention. From 1984 to 1985, he was also the host of a comedy series on Nickelodeon known as Out of Control.

Coulier is best known for playing Joey Gladstone on the ABC sitcom Full House. He stayed on the show from 1987 until its cancellation in 1995. He was famous for doing voices and impersonations. In addition to Full House, Coulier appeared on George and Leo and Nick Freno: Licensed Teacher. He has also hosted America's Funniest People (first with Arleen Sorkin and later with Tawny Kitaen) and Opportunity Knocks. Additionally, he was also a voice actor in Yogi Bear and the Magical Flight of the Spruce Goose and has voiced Felix the Cat on a few occasions. He also put out a solo album called Cut It Out, a self-proclaimed tribute to "tank tops and short shorts."

In addition to his voice work, Coulier has also taken a few acting parts, appearing in the Disney Channel Original Movie's The Thirteenth Year and The Even Stevens Movie (where he had a cameo as a reality show host), as well as the Nickelodeon original film Shredderman Rules. He wrote and starred in an unaired pilot for FX called Whispers and Balls.

He also founded his own children's entertainment company, F3 Entertainment, in 2000. In 2003, Coulier appeared on season three of The Surreal Life. In 2006, he appeared on the TV reality show Skating with Celebrities on FOX, where he was paired with Olympic medalist Nancy Kerrigan. They were eliminated in episode four.

He is a member of Duck's Breath Mystery Theater touring comedy troupe (which he claims is clean comedy but "not quite as creepy" as Full House) as well as the host of the series Animal Kidding.

On June 2, 2008, Chikara, a professional wrestling promotion based in Philadelphia, Pennsylvania, announced that Coulier was elected by the Chikara Board of Directors as the new commissioner of the company, a position that he held for two years until the next election (which took place on May 25, 2010). Coulier is the successor to former Commissioner and fellow Full House cast member Bob Saget.

In 2009, Coulier provided the voice for Bob McKenzie on the Canadian animated series Bob & Doug, based on the SCTV characters Bob and Doug McKenzie. Coulier became the first person other than Rick Moranis to portray the character, as Moranis (who serves as executive producer) was not interested in resuming the part. Coulier says he understands that longtime fans might be skeptical of his take on the role, but he could not help jumping at the chance to portray one of his favorite comic characters. "It's huge shoes to fill, stepping into Rick Moranis' shoes. It's such an established, great character and I guess the only thing I have going for me is that it kind of sounds alike and that half of my family is from Canada." His mother's family is from Bathurst, New Brunswick.

Coulier continued to make regular television appearances as the host of shows such as America's Funniest People and America's Most Talented Kid. He continues to tour the U.S. and Canada as a stand-up comedian.

Coulier reprised his role as Joey Gladstone for the Full House spin-off Fuller House. The show premiered on February 26, 2016 and ran for five seasons, ending on June 5, 2020. He was also the director for some of the episodes. In 2023, Coulier began hosting Full House Rewind, an episode-by-episode rewatch podcast.

== Personal life ==
In the early 1990s, Coulier was married for two years to Jayne Modean. They have a son, Luc, born in 1990. Having divorced, he dated Alanis Morissette for two years, but they broke up shortly before she recorded her album Jagged Little Pill. He was rumored to be the subject of Morissette's song "You Oughta Know" and, in a 2008 interview with the Calgary Herald, Coulier indicated he thinks the rumor is true, as he appeared to receive confirmation of it when reaching out to Morissette. However, in the 2021 documentary Jagged, Morissette denied the song is about Coulier, despite the coincidental timing. In 2005, Coulier began dating photographer and producer Melissa Bring. They married on July 2, 2014, in Montana.

Coulier is a private pilot who owns and flies a B35 Bonanza. His first general aviation flight was at the age of five in Michigan. He earned his private pilot certificate at the same airport in 1979 and is now instrument rated. In 2012, he did more flight training in a Cirrus SR20 to "keep current." He is part of the Hat in the Ring Society to support the AOPA foundation, an organization that promotes safe flying.

Coulier is an ice hockey fan and participates in charity events with the Detroit Red Wings. He is also a fan of the Detroit Tigers and has played in celebrity softball games.

In October 2024, Coulier was diagnosed with stage 3 non-Hodgkin lymphoma, and began chemotherapy. On December 2, 2025, Coulier announced he was diagnosed with p16 squamous carcinoma on the base of his tongue. He said the new cancer was discovered when he went for a checkup and PET Scan and has been going through radiation treatment.

In November 2024, Coulier announced he was going to be a grandfather, as Luc and his wife were expecting their first child. His grandson was born on March 27, 2025.

== Animation ==
In January 2021, during the COVID-19 pandemic, Animation Magazine had reported that Coulier and animation producer Bob Harper were to launch Grilled Cheese Media for the development and production of animated and live-action content "across multiple platforms, including television, streaming platforms, and film".

== In popular culture ==
=== The Same Picture... blog ===
The Same Picture of Dave Coulier Every Day is an image blog which publishes the same photograph of Coulier every day. Begun in 2011 by comedian Aaron Littleton, it is the progenitor of a trend of similarly themed blogs which feature the same content in every daily update. The trend of such "content homogeneity" has been studied in academic literature. The trend has also been called "single-topic", and Forbes has called The Same Picture of Dave Coulier Every Day the apotheosis of the movement.

==== Reception ====
Media coverage has attributed the blog's popularity to its unchanging nature. BBC Trending featured the blog and said "It could be that in the constant chaos of social media, perhaps what sometimes people really need is just the same thing over and over again." The AV Club commented on the blog saying: "A port in a storm, The Same Picture Of Dave Coulier Every Day tumblr is perhaps the only consistent thing left in this tumultuous world." The Toronto Standard said, "In a world pervaded with financial uncertainty and intractable conflict, a little consistency is surely warranted, and an anonymous philanthropist has given us just that in blog form."

Other outlets have noted the inherent humor of the blog. In reference to the blog, The Mary Sue commented, "Either Tumblr must be crowned King of the Comedy-Based Internet, or it must be stopped. It is difficult to tell which is the better option." The book Geek Lust says, "how long can this madness continue?"

== Filmography ==
=== Film ===
Year	Title	Role	Notes
1982	Things Are Tough All Over	Man with Tongue in Restaurant	Credited as David Couwlier
1987	Yogi Bear and the Magical Flight of the Spruce Goose	Firkin	Voice, television film
2006	Farce of the Penguins	There's No Snow Penguin	Voice, direct-to-video
2017	Pup Star: Better 2Gether	Jimmy Kibble	Voice, direct-to-video

=== Television ===
Year	Title	Role	Notes
1979	Scooby and Scrappy-Doo	Muscles Malone, additional voices	
1981	An Evening at the Improv	Himself	Season 1, Episode 6
1984	Out of Control	Dave, Ha Ha	20 episodes
1984	Detroit Comedy Jam	Himself	Special
1985	Newhart		Episode "The prodigal Daryl"
1985	The Jetsons	Additional voices	New version of the 1962 TV series
1986–1991	Muppet Babies	Animal, Bean Bunny, Janice, Bunsen, Statler and Waldorf	Voice, 81 episodes
1987–1995	Full House	Joey Gladstone Uncle Jasper	Main role Season 6, episode 10
1987–1991	The Real Ghostbusters	Peter Venkman	Voice, seasons 3–7 (replaced Lorenzo Music)
1989	Rude Dog and the Dweebs	Dane	Voice
1989	It's Garry Shandling's Show	Garry's Voice Box	Episode: "Garry Acts Like a Moron"
1989	Free Spirit	Kevin Wenceslas	Episode: "Blast from the Past"
1990–1994	America's Funniest People	Himself/host	
1992–1993	The Little Mermaid	Dudley / Moray the Eel	Voice, 8 episodes
1994	Burke's Law	Eddie Bartlett	Episode: "Who Killed the Legal Eagle?"
1995	Freakazoid!	Teenage Boy	Voice, episode: "Freak-a-Panel"
1995	Lois & Clark: The New Adventures of Superman	The Real Anonymous	Episode: "Chip Off the Old Clark"
1995	The Sylvester & Tweety Mysteries	Captain, PC Voice	Voice, 2 episodes
1996	Pinky and the Brain	Tom Hanks	Voice, episode: "Brain's Song"
1996	World's Funniest Videos	Himself/host	Direct-to-video
1997	Extreme Ghostbusters	Peter Venkman	Voice, episode: "Back in the Saddle"
1999	The Thirteenth Year	Whit Griffin	Television film
2002	The Zeta Project	Delivery Bot	Voice, episode: "Resume Mission"
2002	Dexter's Laboratory	Coach	Voice, episode: "Oh, Brother/Another Dad Cartoon/Bar Exam"
2003	The Even Stevens Movie	Lance LeBow	Television film
2003	Teen Titans	Captain	Voice, episode: "Deep Six"
2003	America's Most Talented Kid	Himself/host	
2003–2004	The Surreal Life	Himself	20 episodes
2004	Felix the Cat Saves Christmas	Felix, Rock Bottom	Voice, television film
2005–2019	Robot Chicken	Scooby-Doo, Fred Flintstone, Popeye, Bluto, Michelangelo, Barney Rubble, Tiny Harper	Voice, 9 episodes
2006	Skating with Celebrities	Himself	3 episodes
2006	Plastic Man in Puddle Trouble	Archie	Voice, short film
2007	Shredderman Rules!	Steven Byrd	Television film
2007	The GradeSchool Game	Himself/host	
2007	The Family Holiday	Donald "Doc" Holiday	Direct-to-DVD
2009–2011	Bob & Doug	Bob McKenzie	Voice, 15 episodes
2011–2015	China, IL	Ronald Reagan, additional voices	4 episodes
2013	How I Met Your Mother	Himself	Episode: "P.S. I Love You"
2015	Grandfathered	Therapy Patient	Episode: "My Amal"
2016–2020	Fuller House	Joey Gladstone	Recurring role; also directed 5 episodes
2016	Dream Corp, LLC	Himself	Episode: "Pilot"
2017	Funny You Should Ask	Himself	2 episodes
2017–2018	Voltron: Legendary Defender	Bi Boh Bi	Voice, 2 episodes
2017–2018	Mighty Magiswords	Galactonian Player #3, Murray Williams, Average Pumpkin Magisword, Evil Tree #5	Voice, 3 episodes
2019	Dollface	Himself	Episode: "Guy's Girl"
2020	Worst Cooks in America	Himself	Contestant - Celebrity Edition
2022	Live & Local Pure Flix	Tommy Murphy	DJ - Radio Show Host

== Awards ==
GLAAD Award nomination for the episode on Fuller House that he had directed titled, The Prom.
