= Vin Di Bona =

American television producer and director (born 1944)

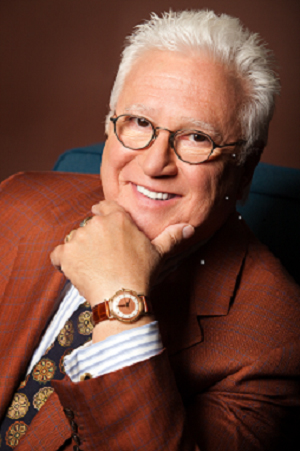
- Di Bona in 2010
- Born: Vincent John Di Bona; April 10, 1944 (age 82); Cranston, Rhode Island, U.S.
- Other name: Johnny Lindy
- Education: Emerson College; University of California, Los Angeles
- Occupation: Television producer
- Employer(s): Vin Di Bona Productions; FishBowl Worldwide Media
- Notable work: MacGyver; Entertainment Tonight; America's Funniest Home Videos; Dancing with the Stars
- Spouses: Gina Di Bona (divorced); Erica Gerard (m. 2006)
- Children: 1

Vincent John "Vin" Di Bona (born April 10, 1944) is an American television producer of the television shows MacGyver, Entertainment Tonight, America's Funniest Home Videos and Dancing with the Stars. He runs an eponymous production company called Vin Di Bona Productions. In 2010, Di Bona launched a second business, FishBowl Worldwide Media, an independent production company developing properties for film, television, digital platforms and brands.

== Early life ==
A native of Cranston, Rhode Island, Di Bona began his career in the entertainment industry as a singer, under the stage name Johnny Lindy (the last name was taken from the Cranston area restaurant owned by his parents and where Di Bona worked as a pre-teen); releasing two records by the age of 16, which became hits regionally. However Di Bona turned his aspirations to making film and television in 1962, later saying "Guys who sang romantic ballads were up a creek without a paddle. So I adapted."

== Personal life ==
In 2006, Di Bona married Erica Gerard, a television production executive he had known from his days at CBS. He has a daughter, Cara Di Bona Swartz, and a step-daughter, Jamie Goldstein.

== Education ==
He received an education at Emerson College in Boston, where he served as manager of WECB, the campus radio station. Di Bona met his first wife, Gina, with whom he has a daughter, Cara. After graduating from Emerson in 1966 and earning a Master of Fine Arts degree in film at UCLA, he worked for nine years at Boston's WBZ-TV (channel 4).

== Career ==
After he left WBZ-TV, Vin moved with his family to Los Angeles in 1975. Di Bona did not find a job for about eight months but finally became employed at CBS directing and producing documentaries, which earned him four Emmys. Di Bona also earned a Peabody Award for the documentary Down at the Dunbar.

Di Bona is considered one of the pioneers of reality TV, thanks to Battle of the Network Stars, which Di Bona produced in 1976. By the 1980s, Di Bona had become a producer for the syndicated newsmagazine Entertainment Tonight and later served as a producer for one season on the ABC series MacGyver; he was also a director for the American Music Awards and the Academy of Country Music Awards and produced taped segments for the 36th Annual Emmy Awards, among others. He also produced a short lived children's cartoon titled Tea Time with Space Dinosaur.

Di Bona's first two television series creations were spawned from Japanese programs. Di Bona developed the ABC series Animal Crack-Ups, based on a popular Tokyo Broadcasting System game show called Waku Waku. America's Funniest Home Videos was inspired by another Tokyo Broadcasting System series, the variety show Fun TV with Kato-chan and Ken-chan.

America's Funniest Home Videos, currently in its thirty-sixth year and the longest-running primetime entertainment show on ABC, reached a milestone 600 episodes in 2017. The show eventually led to three spinoffs, America's Funniest People, the short-lived World's Funniest Videos, and Videos After Dark; along with similar home video shows Show Me The Funny for Fox Family Channel (later ABC Family, now Freeform) and the syndicated series That's Funny. Di Bona also produced several made-for-TV movies and a Showtime series, Sherman Oaks. In 1991, Di Bona secured the rights to produce a revival of Candid Camera; Allen Funt, who owned the rights to the show and agreed to the deal mainly because he needed the money, later spoke out against the revival in his 1994 autobiography. Funt stated that Di Bona had overused product placement and that neither he nor his choice of host, Dom DeLuise, grasped the concept of the show.

Di Bona was chair for The Caucus for Television Producers, Writers and Directors for four years. Having served for many years on the board of trustees for his alma mater, Emerson College, he is now the Board's vice-chairman. He is also chairman of Emerson's 2013 fund-raising committee and donated one million dollars to kick-start the effort. Di Bona received the 2,346th star on the Hollywood Walk of Fame on Thursday, August 23, 2007. In 2009, objects from America's Funniest Home Videos were accepted into the Smithsonian's National Museum of American History, including the camcorder used to shoot the first winning video in 1989.

Vin Di Bona is executive producer of Upload with Shaquille O'Neal, which features the basketball superstar and TNT NBA analyst Shaquille O'Neal. The show consists of O'Neal and friends rounding up the week's online video clips, as well as creating their own viral videos and commenting on and parodying current pop culture stories. The TruTV show also counts executive producers Bruce Gersh, Susan Levison, attorney-executive producer Ellen Stiefler, and writer-executive producer Yahlin Chang among its staff. Vin Di Bona is bringing Dr. Mimi Guarneri's book The Heart Speaks to television at ABC as a weekly medical television drama with Sony Pictures Television.

On January 17, 2023, Di Bona reached an agreement to sell a majority stake in Vin Di Bona Productions and FishBowl Worldwide Media, as well as the rights to both companies’ content libraries, to V10 Entertainment (a subsidiary of private equity firm Clarion Capital Partners that was founded by veteran television producer and Zoo Productions and Hangar 56 Media founder John Stevens). Di Bona would remain CEO of both his eponymous production company and FishBowl Worldwide.

== Controversy ==
In 1992, Arleen Sorkin, who was white, was fired as co-host from the television show America's Funniest People by Di Bona. In response, Sorkin filed a lawsuit against Di Bona, claiming that she was dismissed from the show due to her race, after ABC Chairman Dan Burke had suggested to Di Bona that Sorkin be replaced by an African-American or a person of another ethnic minority. Sorkin sought $450,000 for lost earnings and an additional unspecified amount for harm to her professional reputation and emotional injury. Sorkin additionally claimed that after she denounced the move as unfair, Di Bona changed plans and hired new cohost Tawny Kitaen, who is also white.

In an interview for Ben Shapiro's Primetime Propaganda, Di Bona was asked if the accusation by many conservatives that "Hollywood is a leftist town" and leftist political perspectives dominate scripted television shows was accurate. Di Bona responded that it is "probably accurate, and I'm happy about it." This was a double-barreled question, however, because it asked if Hollywood is a politically left-wing town and if leftist ideologies dominate scripted shows. Shapiro used Di Bona's answer as evidence in his book that producers, executives and writers in the entertainment industry discriminate against conservatives and are using television to promote a socialist political agenda. Di Bona responded by accusing "Shapiro of misrepresentation, saying he never revealed his political agenda."

In March 2019, DiBona's two production companies, Vin Di Bona Entertainment, Inc. and Fishbowl Worldwide Media, Inc., along with individual defendant Phil Shafran, were sued for sexual harassment, sexual assault, sexual abuse, and retaliation by three former female employees. The lawsuit, Case No. 19STCV09487 is pending in Los Angeles Superior Court.
