= List of comedy television series =

This is a list of notable comedy television series by country.

== Argentina ==
Category: Argentinan Comedies

== Australia ==
=== A–M ===
- All Aussie Adventures (satire comedy) (2001–2004)
- All Together Now (sitcom) (1991–1993)
- Angry Boys (2011)
- Are You Being Served? (Australian version of the sitcom) (1980–1981)
- The Aunty Jack Show (satire/sketch comedy) (1972–1973)
- Australia You're Standing In It (sketch comedy) (1983–1984)
- Australia's Funniest Home Videos (1991–present)
- BackBerner (satire/sketch comedy) (1999–2002)
- Beached Az (animated short) (2009–2010)
- Big Girl's Blouse (comedy) (1994)
- Bluey (2018–present)
- The Chaser's War on Everything (2006–2009)
- CNNNN (The Chaser's satire/parody of CNN) (2002–2003)
- The Comedy Company (satire/sketch comedy) (1988–1990)
- Comedy Inc (2003–2007)
- The D-Generation (sketch comedy) (1986–1987)
- DAAS Kapital (satire/sketch comedy) (1991–1992)
- Danger 5 (satire/parody) (2012–2015)
- The Dave Allen Show in Australia (1975–1977)
- The Dingo Principle (satire) (1988)
- Doctor Down Under (1979)
- Double the Fist (satire with sketch elements) (2004–2008)
- Fast Forward (sketch comedy) (1989–1992)
- Father, Dear Father in Australia (1978)
- Frontline (satire/sitcom) (1994–1997)
- Full Frontal (sketch comedy) (1994–1997)
- Funky Squad (satire) (1994)
- The Games (satire/sitcom) (1998–2000)
- The Gerry Connolly Show (satire) (1988)
- The Gillies Report (sketch comedy) (1984–1985)
- The Gillies Republic (sketch comedy) (1986)
- The Glass House (2001–2006)
- The Glynn Nicholas Show (comic variety) (1996)
- Good News Week (1996–present) (also "Good News Week Night Lite" and "Good News Weekend")
- Hamish and Andy's Euro Gap Year (2012)
- Hamish and Andy's Gap Year (2011)
- The Hamster Wheel (satire/comedy) (2011–present)
- Hey Dad! (sitcom) (1986–1994)
- Hey Hey It's Saturday (variety/sketch comedy) (1986–1996)
- The Hollowmen (2008–present)
- Household Help! (sitcom/sketch comedy) (2008–present)
- Housos (2011–present)
- In Melbourne Tonight (1988–1991)
- Ja'mie: Private School Girl (2013)
- Jimeoin (variety/sketch comedy) (1994–1995)
- John Safran vs God (documentary/comedy) (2004)
- John Safran's Music Jamboree (documentary/comedy) (2002)
- Jonah from Tonga (2014)
- Kath & Kim (sitcom) (2002–2007)
- Kingswood Country (sitcom) (1980–1984)
- Laid (sitcom) (2011–2012)
- Lano and Woodley (1997–1998)
- The Late Show (sketch comedy) (1992–1993)
- Lawrence Leung's Choose Your Own Adventure (documentary/comedy) (2008)
- Let the Blood Run Free (parody of hospital dramas) (1990–1992)
- The Librarians (satire) (2007)
- Love Thy Neighbour in Australia (1980)
- Lowdown (2010)
- Lunatics (2019)
- The Mavis Bramston Show (satire/sketch comedy) (1964–1988)
- The Micallef Program (satire/sketch comedy) (2001–2003) (Series 2 was known as The Micallef Programme; series 3 was known as The Micallef Pogram, without the first "r" and the "-me")
- The Money or the Gun (1989–1994)
- Mother and Son (sitcom) (1984–1994)

=== N–Z ===
- The Naked Vicar Show (satire/sketch comedy) (1977–1978)
- News Free Zone (satire/sketch comedy) (1985)
- Newstopia (satire/sketch comedy) (2007–2008)
- The Norman Gunston Show (comedy) (1975–1979)
- Offspring (comedy/drama) (2010–2012)
- Outland (2012)
- The Paul Hogan Show (sketch comedy) (1973–1984)
- Pizza (2000–2007)
- Problems (2012)
- The Rasheed Patel Show (1990–1995)
- Real Stories (2006)
- The Ronnie Johns Half Hour (satire/sketch comedy) (2005–2006)
- Shaun Micallef's Mad as Hell (satire/mock news items/sketch comedy) (2012)
- skitHOUSE (sketch comedy) (2003–2004)
- Something Stupid (1998)
- Stupid, Stupid Man (2006–2007)
- Summer Heights High (satire) (2007)
- Swift and Shift Couriers (2008–2011)
- Talkin' 'Bout Your Generation (humorous game show) (2009–2012; 2018–19)
- Thank God You're Here (improvisation/sketch comedy) (2006–2009)
- Three Men and a Baby Grand (variety/sketch show) (1994)
- Tracey McBean (2001–2006)
- Trial by Marriage (1980)
- The Two Ronnies in Australia (1987)
- Up the Convicts (1976)
- Upper Middle Bogan (2013–2016)
- We Can Be Heroes: Finding The Australian of the Year (satire comedy) (2005)
- Welcher and Welcher (sitcom) (2003)
- The Wiggles (1998–present)
- Wilfred (2007–2010)
- Willing and Abel (sitcom) (1987)
- Woodley (2012)

== Belgium ==
- Alles Kan Beter
- Benidorm
- Benidorm Bastards
- Bob & George
- Buiten De Zone
- Chris & Co
- De Collega's
- F.C. De Kampioenen
- Familie Backeljau
- Gaston & Leo Show
- Hagger Trippy
- Het Eiland
- Het Huis van Wantrouwen
- Het Manneke
- In de gloria
- De Kotmadam
- De Liegende Doos
- Lili & Marleen
- Meester, hy begint weer!
- Morgen Maandag
- Neveneffecten
- Nonkel Jef
- Panique au Palais
- Quiz Me Quick
- De Raf en Ronny Show
- Schalkse Ruiters
- Schipper naast Mathilde
- Slisse & Cesaer
- Les Snuls
- Tragger Hippy
- Trigger Happy
- Votez pour Moi
- Urbain
- Verschoten & Zoon
- De Vliegende Doos
- W817
- De XII Werken van Vanoudenhoven
- Willy's en Marjetten

== Bosnia and Herzegovina ==
- Viza za budućnost

== Brazil ==
- (fdp)
- A Diarista
- A Grande Família
- Além da Ilha
- Alô, Doçura!
- Amigo de Aluguel
- A Mulher Invisível
- A Praça É Nossa
- Casseta & Planeta
- Custe o Que Custar
- Filhos da Pátria
- Fudêncio e Seus Amigos
- Furo MTV
- Hermes & Renato
- Louco por Elas
- Os Aspones
- Os Caras de Pau
- Os Normais
- Os Trapalhões
- Pânico na Band
- Pânico na TV
- Tá no Ar
- Toma Lá, Dá Cá
- Sai de Baixo
- Samantha!
- Show do Tom
- Super Drags
- Zorra Total

== Canada ==
- 15/Love (2004–2006)
- 18 to Life (2010–2011)
- 6teen (2004–2010)
- Abby Hatcher (2019–2022)
- About a Girl (2007–2008)
- The Adventures of Dudley the Dragon (1993–1999)
- Airwaves (1985–1987)
- Almost Naked Animals (2011–2013)
- An American in Canada (2002–2004)
- Animal Mechanicals (2008–2011)
- Anne of Green Gables: The Animated Series (2001–2002)
- Annedroids (2014–2017)
- Baroness von Sketch Show (2016–2021)
- Baxter (2010–2011)
- Being Ian (2005–2008)
- The Big Comfy Couch (1993–2006)
- Big Wolf on Campus (1999–2002)
- Billable Hours (2006–2008)
- Blackfly (2000–2002)
- Boogies Diner (1994–1995)
- Braceface (2001–2004)
- Breaker High (1997–1998)
- Busytown Mysteries (2007–2010)
- Chilly Beach (2003–2007)
- Chris & John's Road Trip! (2005)
- Cloudy with a Chance of Meatballs (2017–2018)
- CODCO (1988–1992)
- Corner Gas (2004–2009)
- Crash Canyon (2011–2013)
- Dan for Mayor (2010–2011)
- The Dating Guy (2010–2011)
- Debra! (2011–2012)
- Dog House (1990–1991)
- The Doodlebops (2005–2007)
- Family Biz (2009)
- Four on the Floor (1986)
- Fries with That? (2004–2005)
- Game On (2015)
- The Gavin Crawford Show (2000–2002)
- Grossology (2006–2009)
- Hangin' In (1981–1987)
- Hiccups (sitcom) (2010–2011)
- The Holmes Show (2002–2003)
- How To Be Indie (2009–2011)
- The Jane Show (2004–2007)
- Jimmy Two-Shoes (2009–2011)
- JR Digs (2001–present)
- Just for Laughs (1983–present in French, 1985–present in English)
- Just for Laughs Gags
- Kevin Spencer (1999–2005)
- Kid vs. Kat (2008–2012)
- The Kids in the Hall (1989–1994)
- Kim's Convenience (2016–2021)
- King of Kensington (1975–1980)
- The Latest Buzz (2007–2009)
- League of Super Evil (2009–2012)
- Life with Boys (2011–2013)
- Life with Derek (2005–2009)
- Little Charmers (2015–2017)
- The Little Vampire (1986–1987)
- Majority Rules! (2009–2010)
- Make It Pop (2015—2016)
- Max & Shred (2014—2016)
- Mr. Young (2011–2013)
- Naturally Sadie (2005–2007)
- Nerds and Monsters (2014–2015)
- The Newsroom (1996–1997, 2003–2005)
- Noddy (1998–1999)
- Numb Chucks (2014–2016)
- Odd Job Jack (2003–2007)
- Overruled! (2009)
- Paw Patrol (2013–present)
- Pelswick (2000–2002)
- The Pentaverate (2022)
- Radio Active (1998–2001)
- Raising Expectations (2016–2018)
- Rated A for Awesome (2011–2012)
- Really Me (2011–2013)
- The Red Green Show (1991–2006)
- Rick Mercer Report (2004–present)
- Royal Canadian Air Farce (1993–present)
- Rusty Rivets (2016–2020)
- Scaredy Squirrel (2011–2013)
- Schitt's Creek (2015–2020)
- Second City Television (SCTV)
- Seeing Things (1981)
- Sidekick (2010–2013)
- Small Achievable Goals (2025–2026)
- Some Assembly Required (2014–2016)
- The Stanley Dynamic (2015–2017)
- Stoked (2009–2013)
- That's So Weird! (2009–2012)
- This Hour Has 22 Minutes (1993–present)
- The Toronto Show
- Total Drama (2007–2015; 2023–present)
- Total Drama Presents: The Ridonculous Race (2015)
- Trailer Park Boys (2001–2007; 2013–2018)
- The Trouble with Tracy (1971–1972)
- Twitch City (1998–2000)
- Wayne & Shuster (1954)
- Wayside (2007–2008)
- What's Up Warthogs! (2011–2012)
- Will and Dewitt (2007–2008)
- Willa's Wild Life (2008–2009)
- Wimzie's House (1995–1996)
- Wingin' It (2010–2013)
- World of Quest (2008–2009)
- The X (2003–present)
- XPM (2003)
- You Can't Do That on Television (1979–1990)

== China ==
- Miracle Star
- Number One Surprise

== Chile ==
- Once Comida (2016)
- 31 Minutos (2003–2005, 2014)
- Hostal Morrison (2011–2013)

== Colombia ==
- Los Comediantes de la noche (2010–2013, 2017)
- Sabados Felices (1972–present)
- The Unremarkable Juanquini (2020–2021)
- Pecados Capitales (2002–2004)
- The Road to Love (2019)
- El Man es Germán (2010–2019)
- Dejemonos de Vainas (1984–1998)
- Te quiero Pecas (1984–1998)
- Dejémonos de Vargas (2022–2023)
- Profesor Super O (2006–)
- Voz Populi TV (2016–2020, 2023)
- Around the world in 80 laughts (2018–)
- La posada (1988–1992)
- Casados con hijos (2004–2006)
- Don Chinche (1982–1989)
- El show de Jimmy (1971–1993)
- Quac (1995–1997)
- Ordoñese de la Risa (1995–2009)
- Los Reencauchados (1995–2001)
- El siguiente programa (1997–2000, 2019)
- Pedro, el escamoso (2001–2003, 2024)
- Noticiero NP& con Los Reencauchados (2009–2013)
- Romeo y Buseta (1987–1992)
- Vuelo secreto (1992–1999)
- Yo y tú (1956–1976)
- Zoociedad (1990–1993)
- También Caerás (1999–2014)
- N.N. (1990–1995)
- The Suso's Show (2009–2013, 2016–)
- Wachendó (2009–2010)
- Klass 95 (2024)

== Croatia ==
- Odmori se, zaslužio si
- Zauvijek susjedi

== Ecuador ==
- Enchufe. Tv (2011–)
- La novela del Cholito (2007–2008)
- El secreto de Toño Palomino (2008–2009)
- El exitoso Lcdo. Cardoso (2009–2010)
- La Pareja Feliz (2009–2014)
- La taxista (2010–2011)
- Mostro de Amor (2010)
- ¡Así pasa! (2013–2014, 2014–2016)
- 3 familias (2014–2020)
- Los hijos de Don Juan (2015–2016)

== France ==
- The Jungle Bunch (2013–2020)

== Greece ==
- Couch 4-3 (2019–)
- Deka Lepta Kirigma (2000–2004)
- Dolce Vita
- Dyo ksenoi
- Epta Thanasimes Petheres (2004–2009)
- Eutixismenoi mazi (2001–2009)
- Peninta Peninta (2005–2007)
- I Ora I Kali (2004–2007)
- I Savvatogennimenes (2004–2005)
- I Tris Harites (1990–1992)
- Iperocha plasmata
- Irthe Ki Edese (2006–2007)
- Kai oi pantremenoi exoun psichi
- Kalinichta mama
- Konstantinou kai Elenis
- Latremenoi Mou Geitones
- Litsa.com
- O kyrios kai i kyria Pells (2009–)
- Oi aftheretoi
- Oi aparadektoi
- Oi Men Kai Oi Den
- S1ngles
- Safe Sex
- Sto Para Pente (2005–2007)
- Tayros me toxoti
- To dis examartein
- To kafe tis Xaras
- To kleidi
- To Kokkino Domatio
- To Retire
- To soi mas
- Xorismenoi me paidia

== India ==
=== A–M ===
- Aa Family Comedy Che
- Aashiq Biwi Ka
- Acting Ki Funshaala
- Alaxmi Ka Super Parivaar
- Ammaji Ki Galli
- Anudamini
- Baa Bahoo Aur Baby
- Bade Bhaiyya Ki Dulhania
- Badi Dooooor Se Aaye Hai
- Badii Devrani
- Bajega Band Baaja
- Bale Telipaale
- Bas thode se anjane
- Bh Se Bhade
- Bhaago KK Aaya
- Bhai Bhaiya Aur Brother
- Bhootwala Serial
- Bin Kuch Kahe
- Burey Bhi Hum Bhale Bhi Hum
- Chalti Ka Naam Gaadi...Let's Go
- Chidiya Ghar
- Chintu Chinki Aur Ek Badi Si Love Story
- Cinemala
- Comedy Champions
- Comedy Classes
- Comedy Express
- Comedy Ka Daily Soap
- Dam Dama Dam
- Dekh Bhai Dekh
- Don't Worry Chachu
- Don't Worry Ho Jayega
- Dr. Madhumati On Duty
- Ek Doosre Se Karte Hain Pyaar Hum
- Ek Se Badkar Ek
- Extra Jabardasth
- F.I.R.
- Family No.1
- Flop Show
- Funjabbi Chak De
- Gangs of Haseepur
- Ghar Jamai
- Golmaal Hai Bhai Sab Golmaal Hai
- The Great Indian Comedy Show
- Gunwale Dulhania Le Jayenge
- Gutur Gu
- Happy Hours
- Har Mard Ka Dard
- Hassi Woh Phassi
- Hazir Jawab Birbal
- Hello Friends
- Hi! Padosi... Kaun Hai Doshi?
- Hudd Kar Di
- Hum Aapke Ghar Mein Rehte Hain
- Hum Aapke Hain In Laws
- Hum Paanch
- Hum Sab Baraati
- I Luv My India
- Idhar Udhar
- Instant Khichdi
- Jaankhilavan Jasoos
- Jabardasth
- Jay Hind!
- Jeannie Aur Juju
- Ji Mantriji
- Ji Sirji!
- Johny Aala Re
- Jugni Chali Jalandhar
- Kabhi Haan Kabhi Naa
- Kabhi Saas Kabhi Bahu
- Kakaji Kahin
- Kanho Banyo Common Man
- Kareena Kareena
- Kartika
- Khichdi
- Khushiyan
- Krishnaben Khakhrawala
- Kya Aap Paanchvi Fail Champu Hain?
- Lapataganj
- LKR
- Lo Ho Gayi Pooja Iss Ghar Ki
- M80 Moosa
- Maddam Sir
- Main Kab Saas Banoongi
- Malegaon Ka Chintu
- Malini Iyer
- Maniben.com
- Mazaak Mazaak Mein
- Mrs. & Mr. Sharma Allahabadwale
- Mrs. Madhuri Dixit
- Mrs. Pammi Pyarelal
- Mrs. Tendulkar
- Mulla Nasiruddin
- Mungerilal Ke Haseen Sapne

=== N–Z ===
- Nadaniyaan
- Narayan Narayan
- Office Office
- OK Jaanu
- Paani Puri
- Pandey Aur Pandey
- Papad Pol – Shahabuddin Rathod Ki Rangeen Duniya
- Piya Ka Ghar Pyaara Lage
- Police Factory
- Professor Pyarelal
- Pyar Zindagi Hai
- Rajani
- Sahib Biwi Aur Boss
- Sajan Re Jhoot Mat Bolo
- Sajan Tum Jhuth Mat Bollo
- Sanya
- Sarabhai vs Sarabhai
- Sasural Genda Phool
- Shararat
- Shree Adi Manav
- Shrimaan Shrimati
- Sunaina
- Tedhi Baat Shekhar Ke Saath
- Thank You Jijaji
- Tota Weds Maina
- Tu Mera Hero
- Tu Mere Agal Bagal Hai
- Tu Tu Main Main
- The Week That Wasn't
- Y.A.R.O Ka Tashan
- Yam Hain Hum
- Yam Kisi Se Kam Nahin
- Yeh Chanda Kanoon Hai
- Yeh Duniyan Gazab Ki
- Yeh Hai Mumbai Meri Jaan
- Yes Boss
- Zabaan Sambhalke
- Zindagi Abhi Baaki Hai Mere Ghost

== Jamaica ==
- Hello World Jamaica (2004–2006)

== Japan ==
=== A–M ===
- Adventures of the Little Koala (1984–1985)
- Aggretsuko (2016–2018); (2018–present)
- Ah My Buddha (2005)
- Ai Mai Mi (2013)
- Ai Shite Knight (1983–1984)
- Air Master (2003)
- Akahori Gedou Hour Rabuge (2005)
- Akiba-chan (2008)
- Akihabara@Deep (2006)
- All Esper Dayo! (2013)
- All Purpose Cultural Cat Girl Nuku Nuku TV (1998)
- Always! Super Radical Gag Family
- Amaenaide yo!! Katsu!! (2006)
- And Yet the Town Moves (2010)
- Animal Yokochō (2005–2006)
- Animated Classics of Japanese Literature (1986)
- Anmitsu Hime: From Amakara Castle (1986–1987)
- Anyamaru Tantei Kiruminzuu (2009–2010)
- Arakawa Under the Bridge (2010)
- Arakawa Under the Bridge*2 (2010)
- Area 88 (2004)
- Aria the Animation (2005)
- Aria the Natural (2006)
- Aria the Origination (2008)
- Asari-chan (1982–1983)
- Assassination Classroom (2015)
- Astro Boy (2003–2004)
- Astro Fighter Sunred (2008–2009)
- Astro Fighter Sunred 2 (2009–2010)
- Atashin'chi (2002–2009)
- Azumanga Daioh: The Animation (2002)
- Beelzebub (2011–2012)
- Bayside Shakedown (1997)
- Bobobo-bo Bo-bobo (2003–2005)
- Cautious Hero: The Hero Is Overpowered but Overly Cautious (2019)
- Cells at Work! (2018–present)
- A Channel (2011)
- Chibi Maruko-chan (1990–1992; 1995–present)
- Crayon Shin-chan (1992–present)
- Di Gi Charat (1999)
- Di Gi Charat Nyo! (2003–2004)
- Doraemon (1973)
- Doraemon (1979–2005)
- Doraemon (2005–present)
- Downtown no Gaki no Tsukai ya Arahende!! (1986–2011)
- Excel Saga (1999–2000)
- The Familiar of Zero (2006)
- The Familiar of Zero: F (2012)
- The Familiar of Zero: Knight of the Twin Moons (2007)
- The Familiar of Zero: Rondo of Princesses (2008)
- FLCL (2000–2001)
- FLCL Alternative (2018)
- FLCL Progressive (2018)
- The Fuccons
- Fushigi Mahō Fan Fan Pharmacy (1998–1999)
- Gabriel DropOut (2017)
- Gals! (2001–2002)
- Goddotan (2005–present)
- The Great Horror Family (2004)
- Gurren Lagann (2007)
- Haruka Seventeen (2005)
- Heli-Tako Pū-chan (1998–1999)
- Hey! Spring of Trivia (2002–2006)
- Himouto! Umaru-chan (2015)
- How Heavy Are the Dumbbells You Lift? (2019)
- Interspecies Reviewers (2020)
- Isekai Quartet (2019–present)
- K-On! (2009–2010)
- K-tai Investigator 7 (2008–2009)
- Kaguya-sama: Love Is War (2019)
- Kaguya-sama: Love Is War? (2020)
- Kaiju Booska (1966–1967)
- Kaiki Renai Sakusen (2015–present)
- Keep Your Hands Off Eizouken! (2020)
- Kill la Kill (2013–2014)
- Kimagure Orange Road (1987–1988)
- Kocchi Muite! Miiko (1998–1999)
- Konna no Idol Janain!? (2012)
- KonoSuba (2016–2017)
- Lost Universe (1998)
- Love Hina (2000)
- Love Live! Nijigasaki High School Idol Club (2020–2022)
- Love Live! (2013–2014)
- Love Live! Sunshine!! (2016–2017)
- Love Live! Superstar!! (2021–2024)
- Lucky Star (2007)
- Lupin the Third Part III (1984–1985)
- Lupin the Third Part IV: The Italian Adventure (2015–2016)
- Lupin the Third Part 5 (2018)
- Lupin the Third Part I (1971–1972)
- Lupin the Third Part II (1977–1980)
- Lupin the Third: The Woman Called Fujiko Mine (2012)
- Mecha-Mecha Iketeru! (1996–present)
- Meitantei no Okite (2009)
- The Melancholy of Haruhi Suzumiya (2006; 2009)
- Miss Kobayashi's Dragon Maid (2017)
- Monkey (1978–1980)
- Monster Musume (2015)
- My Deer Friend Nokotan (2024)

=== N–Z ===
- Nichijou (2011)
- Nisekoi (2014–2015)
- No Matter How I Look at It, It's You Guys' Fault I'm Not Popular! (2013)
- OH! Super Milk Chan (2000)
- One-Punch Man (2015–2019)
- Operation Love (2007)
- Osomatsu-kun (1966–1989)
- Osomatsu-san (Mr. Osomatsu) (2015–present)
- Panty & Stocking with Garterbelt (2010)
- Panyo Panyo Di Gi Charat (2002)
- Perfect Son (2012)
- Pop Team Epic (2018–2019)
- Ranma ½ (1989)
- Ranma ½ Nettōhen (1989–1992)
- Ray the Animation (2006)
- Rosario + Vampire (2008)
- Rosario + Vampire Capu2 (2008)
- Saber Marionette J (1996–1997)
- Saber Marionette J to X (1998–1999)
- Samurai Champloo (2004–2005)
- School Rumble (2004–2005)
- School Rumble: 2nd Semester (2006)
- Scrap Teacher (2008)
- Sgt. Frog (2004–2011)
- Shōnen Onmyōji (2006–2007)
- Shōten (1966–present)
- Slam Dunk (1993–1996)
- Slayers (1995)
- Slayers Evolution-R (2009)
- Slayers Next (1996)
- Slayers Revolution (2008)
- Slayers Try (1997)
- Space Patrol Luluco (2016)
- Space Dandy (2014)
- Super Milk Chan (1998)
- Super Radical Gag Family (1998)
- Sushi TV
- Tadashii Ouji no Tsukuri Kata (2008)
- Takanashi-san (2013)
- Toriko (2011–2014)
- Uchimura Produce (2000–2005)
- Urawa no Usagi-chan (2015)
- Urusei Yatsura (1981–1986)
- Usavich (2006–present)
- Uzaki-chan Wants to Hang Out! (2020–present)
- Vermilion Pleasure Night (2000)
- Welcome to Demon School! Iruma-kun (2019–present)
- You're Under Arrest (1996–1997; 2001)
- You're Under Arrest (live-action) (2002)
- You're Under Arrest: Full Throttle (2007–2008)
- You're Under Arrest Special (1999)
- Zatch Bell! (2003–2006)
- Zettai Kareshi (2008)
- Zombie Land Saga (2018)

== The Netherlands ==
=== # ===
- 30 minuten (1995–1997)

=== A–M ===
- Aaf (2013–2015)
- Achter het scherm (1995)
- Adem in, Adem uit (2021)
- Barend is weer bezig (1972–1973)
- De Familie Knots (1980–1984)
- De Fred Haché Show (1971–1972)
- De Lama's (2004–2008)
- De Luizenmoeder (2018–2019)
- De Wereld Draait Door (2005–2013, 2014–2020)
- Draadstaal (2007–2010, 2015–2020)
- Evelien (2006)
- Flodder (1993-1999)
- Koefnoen (2014–2016)
- Man bijt hond (1999–2006, 2006–2015, 2019–)
- Modern Love Amsterdam (2022)

=== N–Z ===
- New Kids (2007–2009)
- Opzoek naar Yolanda (1984)
- Plafond over de vloer (1986)
- PowNews (2010–2014)
- QI (2008–2009)
- Stiefbeen en Zoon (1963–1971)
- Van Oekel's Discohoek (1974–1975)
- Voetbalvrouwen (2007–2008, 2009–2010)
- Zondag met Lubach (2014–2021)

== New Zealand ==
- 7 Days
- AotearoaHA
- Birdland
- Bro'Town
- Country Calendar
- Country Calendar Dagg Special
- Facelift
- Flight of the Conchords
- Game of 2 Halves
- Go Girls
- The Jaquie Brown Diaries
- The Jono Project
- Letter to Blanchy
- Live at the Classic
- Market Forces
- Moon TV
- Pulp Sport
- Seven Periods with Mr Gormsby
- The Unauthorised History of New Zealand
- Wanna-Ben
- Would I Lie to You? NZ

== Mexico ==
- Amores con trampa (2015)
- Somos los Carmona (2013–2014)
- El Chavo del 8 (1973–1980)
- El Chavo Animado (2006–2014)
- El Chapulín Colorado (1973–1979, 2015–2017)
- Vecinos (2005–2008, 2017–)
- La Familia P.Luche (2002–2012)
- Nosotros Los Guapos (2016–2020)
- La Familia del Barrio (2013–2018)
- Los Lopeggs (2021–)
- Vete a la Versh (2009–)
- El Negas (2009–2022, 2023–)
- Una familia de diez (2007,2019-)
- Los Colorado (2026-)

== Peru ==
- El especial del humor (2004–2014)
- Caiga quien caiga (Perú) (1998–1999)
- The Damian and Toyo Show (1997–)
- El cártel del humor (2011–2012, 2013–2014)
- El enchufe (1993–1994)
- El reventonazo de la chola (2015–)
- El wasap de JB (2017–2021)
- Entre titulares (2006–)
- JB en ATV (2021–)
- Los Cincorregibles (1999)
- Risas y salsa (1980–1999)

== Romania ==
- Atletico Textila (2016–2025)
- Anticamera (2008)
- Arestat la domiciliu (2008)
- Băieți de oraș (2016–2018)
- Bravo, tată! (2023–2024)
- Brigada Nimic (2024)
- Îngerașii (2008–2009)
- În Puii Mei (2009–2018)
- La Bloc (2002–2008)
- La TV (2015–2018)
- Lasă-mă, îmi place! Camera 609 (2023–2024)
- Las Fierbinți (2012–)
- Liber ca pasărea cerului (2019)
- Mangalița (2019–2020)
- Mondenii (2006–2017)
- Moștenirea (2010–2011)
- Nimeni nu-i perfect (2008–2009)
- Razboiul sexelor (2007–2008)
- Scara B (2024)
- Secretele președintelui (2021–)
- State de România (2009–2010)
- Trăsniții (2003–2020)
- Vacanța Mare (1999–2016)

== Russia ==
- Masha and the Bear (2009–present)

== Singapore ==
- All in All Alamelu (2012)
- Alli Rajam
- Chinna Papa Periya Papa (2003–2005, 2015–2016)
- Costly Mapillai (2000)
- Cuba and friends
- Dhinam Dhinam Deepavali (2007–2008)
- Galatta Kudumbam 1 & 2 (1999)
- Khirushna Lattu Thinna Asaiya (2013–2014)
- Krishna Cottage
- Madipakkam Madhavan (2013–2015)
- Mama Mapillai
- Masala Kudumbam
- Maya Basar
- My Name Is Mangamma (2012–2013)
- Naan Aval Illai
- Naduvulai Konsham Pakkathai Kanom
- Phua Chu Kang Pte. Ltd.
- Pondadi Deavai
- Sabash Meera
- Sanmugam Kudumpathinar
- Singaram Theru
- Siri Siri Crazy
- Sirippulogam (2012)
- The Noose
- Under One Roof
- Vanthana Thanthana
- Veetukku Veedu Lutty

== South Korea ==
- All My Love (2010–2011)
- Crash Landing on You (2019–2020)
- YooHoo & Friends (2009–2015)

== Turkey ==
=== A–E ===
- Acemi Cadı (2005–2007)
- Afili Aşk (2019–2020)
- Akasya Durağı (2008–2012)
- Avrupa Yakası (2004–2009)
- Baba Candır (2015–2017)
- Baba Ocağı (2008–2009)
- Babam Çok Değişti (2020–2021)
- Babam Sınıfta Kaldı (2013)
- Belalı Baldız (2005–2006)
- Canım Ailem (2008–2010)
- Cennet Mahallesi (2004–2007)
- Çılgın Bediş (1996–2001)
- Çiçek Taksi (1995–2003)
- Çocuklar Duymasın (2002–2019)
- Çok Güzel Hareketler 2 (2019–2022)
- Çok Güzel Hareketler Bunlar (2001–2008)
- Dadı (2001–2002)
- Darısı Başımıza (2018)
- Dedem, Gofret ve Ben (2001)
- Deli Saraylı (2010)
- Doksanlar (2013–2014)
- Ege'nin Hamsisi (2018)
- Ekmek Teknesi (2002–2005)
- Emret Komutanım (2005–2008)
- En Son Babalar Duyar (2002–2006)
- Erkek Tarafı (2005)
- Familya (2016)
- Fırıldak Nuri (1995)
- EFırtına (2006–2007)

=== G–M ===
- Gece Gündüz (2008–2009)
- Gençliğim Eyvah (2020)
- Geniş Aile (2009–2011)
- Gönül Dağı (2020–)
- Güldür Güldür Show (2013–)
- Halil İbrahim Sofrası (2010–2011)
- Hangimiz Sevmedik (2016–2017)
- Hastane (1993–1996)
- Hayal ve Gerçek (2007)
- Hayat Bilgisi (2003–2006)
- İçimizden Biri (2021)
- İki Aile (2006–2008)
- İki Arada Aşk (2005)
- İnce İnce Yasemince (1995–2011)
- İşler Güçler (2012–2013)
- Jet Sosyete (2018–2020)
- Kahraman Damat (1992)
- Kahve Bahane (2009–2010)
- Kaynanalar (1974–1988, 1997–1999, 2000–2002)
- Kiraz Mevsimi (2014–2015)
- Kral Şakir (2016–2019)
- Leyla and Mecnun (2011–2013, 2021–2023)
- Lise Devriyesi (2017)
- Love 101 (2020–2021)
- Lüküs Hayat (1989)
- Mahmut Mangal (1980)
- Meleklerin Aşkı (2018)
- Mert ile Gert (2008–2009)
- Mirasyediler (1996–1997)
- Muhteşem İkili (2018–2019)

=== N–Z ===
- N'olur Ayrılalım (2016)
- Nerdesin Birader (2017)
- Pertev Bey'in Üç Kızı (2006)
- Pis Yedili (2011–2014)
- Portatif Hüseyin (1991–1993)
- Poyraz Karayel (2015–2017)
- Roman Havası (2014–2015)
- Ruhsar (1998–2001)
- Ruhumun Aynası (2014)
- Salih Kuşu (2013)
- Seksenler (2012–2022)
- Selena (2006–2009)
- Sıdıka (1997–2003)
- Sihirli Safiye (1994)
- Şaban ile Şirin (1997)
- Şahane Hayatım (2023–)
- Şaşkın Bakkal 216 (2020)
- Şevkat Yerimdar (2017–2018)
- Şimdi Onlar Düşünsün (2014–2015)
- Tatil Aşkları (2004)
- Tatlı Bela Fadime (2007–2008)
- Tatlı İntikam (2016)
- Tövbeler Tövbesi (2011–2012)
- Türk Malı (2010–2011, 2017)

}* Ulan İstanbul (2014–2015)

- Umutsuz Ev Kadınları (2011–2014)
- Uy Başuma Gelenler (2004)
- Uzaylı Zekiye (1988)

}* Üsküdar'a Giderken (2011)

- Varsayalım İsmail (1991)
- Yabancı Damat (2004–2007)
- Yahşi Cazibe (2010–2012)
- Yalan Dünya (2012–2014)
- Yalancı Romantik (2008–2010)
- Yarım Elma (2002–2004)
- Zaman Mekan Makinesi (1981)
- Zapping Ailesi (1993–1994)
- Zil Çalınca (2012–2013)

== United Kingdom ==
=== # ===
- 15 Storeys High (2002–2004)
- 2point4 Children (1991–1999)

=== A ===
- Absolute Power (2003–2006)
- Absolutely (1989–1993)
- Absolutely Fabulous (1992–2004; 2011–2012)
- According to Bex (2005)
- An Actor's Life for Me (1991)
- The Adventures of Aggie (1956–1957)
- The Adventures of Brigadier Wellington-Bull (1959)
- Affairs of the Heart (1983–1985)
- After Henry (1988–1992)
- Agony (1979–1981)
- Agony Again (1995)
- Ain't Misbehavin' (1994–1995)
- Alas Smith and Jones (1984–1998)
- Albert and Victoria (1970–1971)
- Alcock and Gander (1972)
- Alexander the Greatest (1971–1972)
- Alistair McGowan's Big Impression (1999–2002)
- All About Me (2002–2004)
- All Along the Watchtower (1999)
- All at No 20 (1986–1987)
- All Change (1989–1991)
- All Gas and Gaiters (1966–1971)
- All in Good Faith (1985–1988)
- All Night Long (1994)
- All Our Saturdays (1973)
- 'Allo 'Allo! (1982–1992)
- Amandaland (2025–)
- ...And Mother Makes Three (1971–1973)
- ...And Mother Makes Five (1974–1976)
- Andy Capp (1988)
- Anything but Love (1989–1992)
- Are You Being Served? (1972–1985)
- The Army Game (1957–1961)
- The Artful Dodger (1959)
- The Arthur Askey Show (1961)
- Arthur's Treasured Volumes (1960)
- As Good Cooks Go (1969–70)
- As Time Goes By (1992–2005)
- Astronauts (1981)
- At Last the 1948 Show (1967–1968)
- Atletico Partick (1995–1996)
- Attention Scum! (2001)

=== B ===
- B-And-B (1968)
- Babes in the Wood (1998–1999)
- Bachelor Father (1970–1971)
- Backs to the Land (1977–1978)
- Bad Education (2012–2024)
- Baddiel and Skinner Unplanned (2000–2005)
- The Baldy Man (1995–1998)
- Barbara (1995–2003)
- A Bear's Tail (2005)
- Beast (2000–2001)
- The Bed-Sit Girl (1965–1966)
- Beggar My Neighbour (1966–1968)
- Believe Nothing (2002)
- The Benny Hill Show (1955–1991)
- The Big One (1992)
- Big Train (1998–2002)
- Billy Liar (1973–1974)
- Birds of a Feather (1989–1998)
- A Bit of a Do (1989)
- A Bit of Fry and Laurie (1987–1995)
- Black Books (2000–2004)
- Blackadder (1983–1989)
- Blandings Castle (1967)
- Bless Me Father (1978–1981)
- Bless This House (1971–1976)
- Blessed (2005)
- Bloomers (1979)
- Blott on the Landscape (1985)
- Blue Heaven (1992–1994)
- Bo' Selecta! (2002–2004)
- Bob the Builder (1999–2011; 2015–2018)
- Bonjour la Classe (1993)
- The Book Group (2002–2003)
- Bootsie and Snudge (1960–1974)
- Bottle Boys (1984–1985)
- Bottom (1991–1995)
- The Bounder (1982–1983)
- Brass (1982—1990)
- Brass Eye (1997–2001)
- Bread (1986–1991)
- Bremner, Bird and Fortune (1999–2010)
- The Brian Conley Show (1992–2000)
- The Brittas Empire (1991–1997)
- Broaden Your Mind (1968–1969)
- Broken News (2005)
- Brotherly Love (1999)
- Brothers in Law (1962)
- Bruiser (2000)
- Brush Strokes (1986–1991)
- Butterflies (1978–1983)

=== C ===
- Cannon and Ball (1979–1988)
- Captain Butler (1997)
- Carrie and Barry (2004)
- Casanova '73 (1973)
- The Catherine Tate Show (2004–2007)
- Catterick (2004)
- Chalk (1997)
- Chambers (2000–2001)
- Chance in a Million (1984–1986)
- Chef! (1993–1996)
- Chelmsford 123 (1988–1990)
- Chucklevision (1987–2009)
- Citizen James (1960–1962)
- Citizen Smith (1977–1980)
- City Lights (1984–1991)
- Clarence (1988)
- Clone (2008)
- Cold Feet (1998–2003)
- Colin's Sandwich (1988–1990)
- Come Back Mrs. Noah (1977–1978)
- Come Fly with Me (2010)
- Comedy Playhouse (1962–1974)
- The Comic Side of 7 Days (2005)
- Coming of Age (2007–2011)
- Comrade Dad (1986)
- Coupling (2000–2004)
- The Cuckoo Waltz (1975–1980)
- Curry and Chips (1969)

=== D ===
- Da Ali G Show (2000)
- Dad (1997–1999)
- Dad's Army (1968–1977)
- Danger Mouse (1981–1992)
- The Day Today (1994)
- Dead Ernest (1980)
- Dead Ringers (2002–2007)
- Dear John (1986–1987)
- Dear Mother...Love Albert (1969–1971)
- Derry Girls (2018–2019)
- Desmond's (1989–1994)
- The Detectives (1993–1997)
- Detectorists (2014–2017)
- The Dick Emery Show (1963–1981)
- Dinnerladies (1998–2000)
- Do Not Adjust Your Set (1967–1969)
- Doctor in the House (1969–1991)
- Doctors and Nurses (2004)
- Don't Wait Up (1983–1990)
- Dressing for Breakfast (1995–1998)
- Drop the Dead Donkey (1990–1998)
- The Dustbinmen (1968–1970)
- Duty Free (1984–1986)

=== E ===
- Early Doors (2003–2004)
- Educating Archie (1958–1959)
- Elliott from Earth (2021–present)
- Empty (2008)
- End of Part One (1979–1980)
- The Estate Agents (2002)
- Ever Decreasing Circles (1984–1989)
- Executive Stress (1986–1988)
- Extras (2005–2007)
- Eyes Down (2003–2004)

=== F ===
- The Fall and Rise of Reginald Perrin (1976–1979)
- The Fast Show (1994–2001)
- Father, Dear Father (1968–1973)
- Father Ted (1995–1998)
- Fawlty Towers (1975–1979)
- Feel the Force (2006)
- Fifi and the Flowertots (2005–2010)
- Filthy Rich and Catflap (1987)
- A Fine Romance (1981–1984)
- Fireman Sam (1987–present)
- First of the Summer Wine (1988–1989)
- Fist of Fun (1995–1996)
- Fleabag (2016–2019)
- French and Saunders (1987–2007)
- French Fields (1989–1991)
- Fresh Fields (1984–1986)
- Friday Night Dinner (2011–2020)
- The Frost Report (1966–1967)

=== G ===
- Game On (1995–1998)
- Garth Marenghi's Darkplace (2004)
- Gavin & Stacey (2007–2010)
- George and Mildred (1976–1979)
- Get Some In! (1975–1978)
- Ghosts (2019–2023)
- Girls on Top (1985–1986)
- Gimme Gimme Gimme (1999–2001)
- Give My Head Peace (1998–present)
- The Gnomes of Dulwich (1969)
- The Good Life (1975–1978)
- The Goodies (1970–1982)
- Goodness Gracious Me (1998–2000)
- Goodnight Sweetheart (1993–1999)
- Grace & Favour (1992–1993)
- The Green Green Grass (2005–2009)
- Green Wing (2004–2007)

=== H ===
- Hancock's Half Hour (later known as Hancock, 1956–1961)
- Haggard (1990–1991)
- Happy Families (1985)
- Hark at Barker (1969–1970)
- Hazell (1978–1979)
- Hello, Cheeky! (1976)
- Hell's Bells (1986)
- The Heroic Quest of the Valiant Prince Ivandoe (2017)
- Hi-de-Hi! (1980–1988)
- The High Life (1995)
- Hippies (1999)
- His Lordship Entertains (1972)
- The Hitchhiker's Guide to the Galaxy (1981)
- Holding the Fort (1980–1982)
- Hollywood 7 (2001)
- Home to Roost (1985–1990)
- Honey for Tea (1994)
- How to Irritate People (1968)
- Hyperdrive (2006–2007)

=== I ===
- Ideal (2005–2011)
- The Idiot Weekly, Price 2d (1956)
- I'm Alan Partridge (1997–2002)
- In Loving Memory pilot (1969) (1979–1986)
- The Inbetweeners (2008–2010)
- The Irish R.M. (1983–1985)
- It Ain't Half Hot Mum (1974–1981)
- The IT Crowd (2006–2010)
- It's Pony (2020–2022)

=== J ===
- Jam (2000)
- Jam & Jerusalem (2006–2009)
- Jeeves and Wooster (1990–1993)
- Joking Apart (1991–1995)

=== K ===
- A Kick Up the Eighties (1981–1984)
- The Kids International Show (1982)
- Keep It in the Family (1980–1983)
- Keeping Mum (1997–1998)
- Keeping Up Appearances (1990–1993, 1995)
- The Kenny Everett Video Show (1981–1988)
- The Kids International Show (1982)
- Knowing Me Knowing You with Alan Partridge (1994–1995)
- The Kumars at No. 42 (2001–2006)
- KYTV (1989–1993)

=== L ===
- L.A. 7 (2000)
- Last of the Summer Wine (1973–2010)
- The Late Show (1966–1967)
- Lead Balloon (2006–2011)
- The League of Gentlemen (1999–2002)
- The Lenny Henry Show (1984–1988)
- Les Girls (1988)
- Let Them Eat Cake (1999)
- Life Begins at Forty (1978–1980)
- Life of Riley (2009–2011)
- The Likely Lads (1964–1966)
- Little Britain (2003–2006)
- Living It Up (1957–1958)
- Look Around You (2002–2005)
- The Losers (1978)
- Love and Kisses (1955)
- Love Thy Neighbour (1972–1976)

=== M ===
- Maid Marian and Her Merry Men (1989–1994)
- Man About the House (1973–1976)
- Man Like Mobeen (2017–present)
- Man Stroke Woman (2005–2007)
- Marion and Geoff (2000–2003)
- Marriage Lines (1963–1966)
- Marty (1968–1969)
- May to December (1989–1994)
- Me and My Girl (1984–1988)
- Meet the Wife (1963–1966)
- Men Behaving Badly (1992–1998)
- Miami 7 (1999)
- The Mighty Boosh (2005–2007)
- Mind Your Language (1977–1986)
- Miranda (TV series) (2009–2015)
- Misfits (2009–2013)
- Miss Jones and Son (1977)
- Mr. Bean (1990–1995)
- Mrs. Brown's Boys (2011–present)
- The Mitchell and Webb Situation (2001)
- Monarch of the Glen (2000–2005)
- Monkey Dust (2003–2005)
- Monty Python's Flying Circus (1969–1974)
- The Morecambe and Wise Show (1968–1977)
- Mulberry (1992–1993)
- Murder Most Horrid (1991–1999)
- My Family (2000–2011)
- My Hero (UK) (2000–2006)
- My Husband and I (1956)
- My Husband and I (1987–1988)
- My Life as a College Student (2014–2016)
- My Life as a College Student 2: The Adventure Continues (2016–17)

=== N ===
- Nearest and Dearest (1968–1973)
- Never Mind the Quality, Feel the Width (1967–1971)
- Never the Twain (1981–1991)
- The New Statesman (1987–1994)
- Next of Kin (1995–1997)
- Nightingales (1990–1993)
- Nighty Night (2004–2005)
- No, Honestly (1974)
- No Job for a Lady (1990–1992)
- Not Going Out (2006–present)
- Not the Nine O'Clock News (1979–1982)
- Not Only... But Also (1965–1970)
- 'Neatza cu Răzvan și Dani (2008–present)

=== O ===
- Oh, Brother! (1968–1970)
- Oh, Doctor Beeching! (1995–1997)
- The Office (2001–2003)
- One Foot in the Grave (1990–2000)
- One-Upmanship (1976)
- On the Buses (1969–1973)
- On the Up (1990–1992)
- Only Fools and Horses (1981–2003)
- Open All Hours (1973–1985)
- Outnumbered (2007-2024)

=== P ===
- Peep Show (2003–present)
- Peppa Pig (2004–present)
- A Perfect State (1997)
- Perfect World (2000–2001)
- Peter Kay's Phoenix Nights (2001–2002)
- Pet Squad (2011)
- The Piglet Files (1990–1992)
- Plebs (2013–present)
- Porridge (1973–1977)
- Postman Pat (1981–2017)
- Pulling (2006–2009)

=== Q ===
- Q5 (1969–1970)

=== R ===
- Red Dwarf (1988–1999, 2009, 2012–present)
- Red Dwarf: Back to Earth (2009)
- Rev. (2010–2014)
- Rex the Runt (1998–2001)
- Ripping Yarns (1976–1979)
- Rising Damp (1974–1978)
- Rita Rudner (1990)
- Roary the Racing Car (2007–2010)
- Robin's Nest (1977–1981)
- Rock & Chips (2010–2011)
- Romany Jones (1972–1975)
- Root Into Europe (1992)
- Round and Round (1984)
- The Royle Family (1998–2000, 2006, 2008, 2009, 2010, 2012)

=== S ===
- Saxondale (2006–2007)
- The Secret Show (2006–2007)
- The Secretary Bird (1968–1970)
- Shameless (2004–2013)
- Shelley (1979–1992)
- Sink or Swim (1980–1982)
- Skins (2007–2013)
- Smack the Pony (1999–2003)
- A Small Problem (1987)
- The Smoking Room (2004–2006)
- Snuff Box (2006)
- So Haunt Me (1992–1994)
- Solo (1981–1982)
- Some Girls (2012–2014)
- Some Mothers Do 'Ave 'Em (1973–1978)
- Sorry! (1981–1988)
- Spaced (1999–2001)
- Spy (2011–2012)
- The Staggering Stories of Ferdinand de Bargos (1989)
- Steptoe and Son (1962–1974)
- Still Game (2002–2019)
- Stressed Eric (1998–2000)
- Stupid! (2005–2006)
- Supernova (2005–2006)
- Sykes (1972–1979)
- Sykes and A... (1960–1965)
- Sykes and a Big, Big Show (1971)

=== T ===
- Teachers (2001–2004)
- Terry and June (1979–1987)
- That Mitchell and Webb Look (2006–2010)
- That Was The Week That Was (familiarly known as "TW3") (1962–1963)
- That's Your Funeral (1971)
- The Thick of It (2005–2012)
- The Thin Blue Line (1995–1996)
- This is Jinsy (2010, 2011, 2014)
- Thomas & Friends (1984–2021)
- Three of a Kind (1981–1983)
- Three Up, Two Down (1985–1989)
- Till Death Us Do Part (1965–1975)
- Time Gentlemen Please (2000–2002)
- Together (2015)
- Tom, Dick and Harriet (1982–1983)
- The Tony Hancock Show (1956–1957)
- Tracey Breaks the News (2017–present)
- Tracey Ullman's Show (2016–2017)
- Trollied (2011–2018)
- Two Pints of Lager and a Packet of Crisps (2001–2011)

=== U ===
- The Uncle Floyd Show (1974–1995)
- Up Pompeii! (1969–1970)
- The Upper Hand (1990–1996)

=== V ===
- The Vicar of Dibley (1994–2007)
- Vicious (2013–2016)
- Viva S Club (2002)

=== W ===
- Waiting for God (1990–1994)
- Watching (1987–1993)
- Whack-O! (1956–1972)
- What Ever Happened to the Likely Lads? (continued The Likely Lads series) (1973–1974)
- Whites (2010)
- Who Dares Wins (1983–1988)
- Whoops Apocalypse (1982)
- Whoops Baghdad (1973)
- Wodehouse Playhouse (1975–1978)
- The World of Wooster (1965–1967)
- Writers (2015–present)
- The Wrong Mans (2013–2014)

=== Y ===
- Yes Minister (1980–1984) and Yes, Prime Minister, its sequel (1986–1988)
- You Must Be the Husband (1987–1988)
- You Rang, M'Lord? (1988–1993)
- The Young Ones (1982–1984)

== United States ==
=== # ===
- @midnight (2013–2017)
- The $1.98 Beauty Show (1978–1980)
- 100 Things to Do Before High School (2014–2016)
- 1000 Ways to Die (2008–2012)
- 12 oz. Mouse (2005–2006; 2020)
- The 13 Ghosts of Scooby-Doo (1985)
- 2 Stupid Dogs (1993–1995)

=== A-E ===
- Aaahh!!! Real Monsters (1994–1997)
- Action League Now! (1995–2002)
- Adorableness (2021)
- Adults (2025–)
- Adventure Time (2010–2018; 2020; 2023–)
- The Adventures of Brisco County, Jr. (1993–1994)
- The Adventures of Jimmy Neutron, Boy Genius (2002–2006; 2010–2013)
- The Adventures of Oky Doky (1948–1949)
- The Adventures of Rocky and Bullwinkle and Friends (1959–1964; 2018–2019)
- Adventures of Sonic the Hedgehog (1993)
- After Lately (2011–2013)
- Ain't That America (2013–2014)
- ALF Tales (1988–1989)
- ALF: The Animated Series (1987–1989)
- ALF's Hit Talk Show (2004)
- Alien Dawn (2013–2014)
- Alien News Desk (2019)
- All Hail King Julien (2014–2017)
- Almost Genius (2015–2016)
- Alvin and the Chipmunks (1983–1991)
- The Alvin Show (1961–1962)
- America's Funniest Home Videos (1989–; 2021–2022)
- American Dragon: Jake Long (2005–2007)
- Among Us (2026)
- Amphibia (2019–2022)
- The Angry Beavers (1997–2001)
- Animals. (2016–2018)
- Animaniacs (1993–1998; 1995–1998; 1998–1999; 2020–2023)
- Apple & Onion (2018–2021)
- Ash vs Evil Dead (2015–2018)
- The Assistant (2004)
- Atom Ant (1965–1967)
- Augie Doggie and Doggie Daddy (1959–1961)
- Austin & Ally (2011–2016)
- The Awful Truth (1999–2000)
- Axe Cop (2013–2015)
- Baby Looney Tunes (2002–2005)
- Back at the Barnyard (2007–2011)
- The Barbarian and the Troll (2021)
- Barely Famous (2015–2016)
- The Baseball Bunch (1980–1985)
- Batman (1966–1968)
- Be Cool, Scooby-Doo! (2015–2018)
- Bear in the Big Blue House (1997–2006)
- Beat the Geeks (2001–2002)
- Bella and the Bulldogs (2015–2016)
- Ben 10 (2017–2021)
- Best Friends Whenever (2015–2016)
- Big City Greens (2018–)
- Billy on the Street (2011–2017)
- Bizaardvark (2016–2019)
- Black Dynamite (2012–2015)
- Bobb'e Says (2009)
- Bobcat Goldthwait's Misfits & Monsters (2018)
- Bonkers (1993–1994)
- The Book of Pooh (2001–2003)
- Brandy & Mr. Whiskers (2004–2006)
- Breadwinners (2014–2016)
- Brody Stevens: Enjoy It! (2013–2014)
- Bugs Bunny Builders (2022–)
- Bunnicula (2016–2018)
- Bunsen Is a Beast (2017–2018)
- The Burn with Jeff Ross (2012–2013)
- Buzz Lightyear of Star Command (2000–2001)
- The Buzz on Maggie (2005–2006)
- Camp Lazlo (2005–2008)
- Candid Camera (1948–2014)
- Captain Caveman and the Teen Angels (1977–1980)
- The Carbonaro Effect (2014–2020)
- CatDog (1998–2005)
- Catscratch (2005–2007)
- The Cattanooga Cats (1969–1971)
- Cavalcade of Stars (1949–1952)
- Celebrity Deathmatch (1998–2002, 2006–2007)
- The Chair Company (2025–)
- ChalkZone (2002–2008)
- The Charlie Brown and Snoopy Show (1983–1985)
- The Cheap Show (1978–1979)
- Chelsea (2016–2017)
- Chelsea Lately (2007–2014)
- Chibiverse (2022–present)
- Chip 'n Dale: Rescue Rangers (1989–1990; 2022 film)
- The Chris Gethard Show (2014–2020)
- Chowder (2007–2010)
- Clarence (2014–2018)
- Class of 3000 (2006–2008)
- Clifford the Big Red Dog (2000–2003; 2003–2006; 2019–2021)
- Code: 9 (2012)
- Codename: Kids Next Door (2002–2008)
- Coke Time with Eddie Fisher (1953–1957)
- The Colbert Report (2005–2014)
- Comedy Bang! Bang! (2012–2016)
- Comedy Central Presents (1998–2011)
- Comedy Central Stand-Up Presents (2012–2019)
- Comedy Knockout (2016–2018)
- Comedy Underground with Dave Attell (2014)
- Comics Unleashed (2006–2016; 2023–2024; 2025–)
- Conan (2010–2021)
- Coop & Cami Ask the World (2018–2020)
- Courage the Cowardly Dog (1999–2004)
- Cousins for Life (2018–2019)
- Cow and Chicken (1997–1999; 1997–2000)
- Craig of the Creek (2018–2025)
- Crossballs: The Debate Show (2004)
- Curious George (2006–2022)
- The Daily Show (1996–)
- Dallas & Robo (2018)
- Danny Phantom (2004–2007)
- Darkwing Duck (1991–1992)
- Dave the Barbarian (2004–2005)
- DC Nation Shorts (2011–2014)
- DC Super Hero Girls (2019–2021)
- Deal with It (2013–2014)
- The Dean Martin Show (1965–1974)
- Decker (2014–2020)
- Deliciousness (2020)
- Deputy Dawg (1959–1972)
- Dexter's Laboratory (1996–2003)
- The Dick & Paula Celebrity Special (1999–2000)
- DJ & the Fro (2009)
- Dog with a Blog (2012–2015)
- Donkey Hodie (2021–)
- Dream Productions (2024)
- Drew Carey's Green Screen Show (2004–2005)
- The Drinky Crow Show (2007–2009)
- Drunk History (2013–2019)
- Duck Dodgers (2003–2005)
- DuckTales (1987–1990; 2017–2021)
- Eagleheart (2011–2014)
- Easy Aces (1949–1950)
- The Ed Wynn Show (1949–1950)
- The Eddie Fisher Show (1957–1959)
- El Tigre: The Adventures of Manny Rivera (2007–2008)
- Electric Bloom (2025)
- Elle (2026–)
- The Emperor's New School (2006–2008)
- Entourage (2004–2011)
- Erin & Aaron (2023)
- Everything's Trash (2022)
- Evil Con Carne (2003–2004)

=== F-J ===
- The Fairly OddParents (2001–2017; 2022–2023; 2024)
- The Fall and Rise of Reggie Dinkins (2026–)
- Fanboy & Chum Chum (2009–2014)
- Fantasmas (2024)
- Fast Layne (2019–2021)
- Fat Guy Stuck in Internet (2007–2008)
- Final Space (2018–2021)
- Fish Police (1992)
- Forky Asks a Question (2019–2020)
- Foster's Home for Imaginary Friends (2004–2009)
- The Four Seasons (2025–)
- The Franchise (2024)
- Freakazoid! (1995–1997)
- The Fresh Beat Band (2009–2013; 2015–2016)
- Friends from College (2017–2019)
- Full Frontal with Samantha Bee (2016–2022)
- The Fungies! (2020–2021)
- Funniest Wins (2014)
- Funny or Die Presents: America's Next Weatherman (2015)
- Gabby Duran & the Unsittables (2019–2021)
- Gabriel Iglesias Presents Stand Up Revolution (2011–2014)
- Galaxy Goof-Ups (1978)
- Game Shakers (2015–2019)
- Gamer's Guide to Pretty Much Everything (2015–2017)
- Garfield and Friends (1988–1994)
- George of the Jungle (1967–1968; 2007–2008; 2016–2017)
- Georgie & Mandy's First Marriage (2024–)
- Gerhard Reinke's Wanderlust (2003)
- The Ghost and Molly McGee (2021–2024)
- Girl Code (2013)
- Girls5eva (2021–2022, 2024)
- Going Dutch (2025–2026)
- The Gong Show with Dave Attell (2008)
- Good Morning Today (2013–2014)
- The Gorburger Show (2017)
- The Graham Norton Effect (2004)
- Gravedale High (1990–1991)
- Gravity Falls (2012–2016)
- The Great Grape Ape Show (1975)
- Great Minds with Dan Harmon (2016)
- The Greatest @Home Videos (2020–2025)
- Greatest Party Story Ever (2016)
- Green Eggs and Ham (2019–2022)
- Grim & Evil (2001–2004)
- The Grim Adventures of Billy & Mandy (2003–2008)
- The Guardians of Justice (2022)
- Guy Code (2011–2015)
- Guy Court (2013)
- Gutfeld! (2015–)
- Hamster & Gretel (2022–2025)
- The Hanna-Barbera New Cartoon Series (1962–1963)
- Happy! (2017–2019)
- Harley Quinn (2019–)
- HarmonQuest (2016–2019)
- Harvey Beaks (2015–2017)
- Have I Got News for You (2024–)
- The Hawk (2026–)
- The Head (1994–1996)
- The Heart, She Holler (2011–2014)
- Henry Danger (2014–2020; 2020–2024)
- Hell of a Week with Charlamagne tha God (2021–2022)
- Help!... It's the Hair Bear Bunch! (1971–1972)
- Hey Arnold! (1996–2004; 2017 TV movie)
- Hi Hi Puffy AmiYumi (2004–2006)
- The High Court with Doug Benson (2017)
- The High Fructose Adventures of Annoying Orange (2012–2014)
- High Guardian Spice (2021)
- Hollywood Darlings (2017–2018)
- Hong Kong Phooey (1974)
- Hopeless Pictures (2005)
- House of Mouse (2001–2003)
- The Huckleberry Hound Show (1958–1961)
- Hunter Street (2017–2019)
- I Didn't Do It (2014–2015)
- I'm with Busey (2003)
- Imagination Movers (2008–2013)
- Impractical Jokers (2011–)
- Insomniac with Dave Attell (2001–2004)
- Invader Zim (2001–2006)
- It's a Big Big World (2006–2010)
- Jabberjaw (1976)
- The Jack Benny Program (1950–1965)
- Jellystone! (2021–2025)
- The Jenny McCarthy Show (1997)
- Jessie (2011–2015; 2015–2024)
- The Jim Jefferies Show (2017–2019)
- Jimmy Kimmel Live (2003–)
- JJ Villard's Fairy Tales (2020)
- Joe Pera Talks with You (2018–2021)
- The Joel McHale Show with Joel McHale (2018)
- John Oliver's New York Stand-Up Show (2010–2013)
- Johnny Bravo (1997–2004)
- JoJo's Circus (2003–2007)
- Josie and the Pussycats (1970–1972; 2001 film)
- Just Roll with It (2019–2021)

=== K-O ===
- K.C. Undercover (2015–2018)
- Kappa Mikey (2006–2008)
- Kenny the Shark (2003–2005)
- Kick Buttowski: Suburban Daredevil (2010–2012)
- Kickin' It (2011–2015)
- Kiff (2023–)
- Killing It (2022–2023)
- Kim Possible (2002–2007)
- King Star King (2014)
- Knight Squad (2018–2019)
- Krypto the Superdog (2005–2006)
- Kung Fu Panda: Legends of Awesomeness (2011–2016)
- Lab Rats (2012–2016; 2016)
- Lady Dynamite (2016–2017)
- Laff-A-Lympics (1977–1978)
- Laid (2024)
- Last Week Tonight with John Oliver (2014–)
- Lazor Wulf (2019–2021)
- Legendary Dudas (2016)
- Let's Bowl (2001–2002)
- The Life & Times of Juniper Lee (2005–2007)
- The Life of Riley (1944–1951 on radio, 1949–1950 on television)
- Lights Out with David Spade (2019–2020)
- Lil' Bush (2007–2008)
- Lilo & Stitch: The Series (2003–2006)
- A Little Late with Lilly Singh (2019–2021)
- Liverspots and Astronots (2018)
- Liv & Maddie (2013–2017)
- Long Live the Royals (2015)
- Looney Tunes Cartoons (2020–2023)
- The Loud House (2016–; 2019–2022; 2022–2024)
- Love, American Style (1969–1974)
- Lucy, the Daughter of the Devil (2005–2007)
- The Lucy-Desi Comedy Hour (1957–1960)
- M.O.D.O.K. (2021)
- The Magilla Gorilla Show (1964–1965)
- Major Lazer (2014–2015)
- Make Me Laugh (1958–1988)
- Making Fiends (2008)
- A Man on the Inside (2024–)
- Mao Mao: Heroes of Pure Heart (2019–2020)
- The Marvelous Misadventures of Flapjack (2008–2010)
- The Maxx (1995)
- Maya & Marty (2016)
- Maya & Miguel (2004–2007; 2007–2015)
- Mecha Builders (2022–2023)
- The Meltdown with Jonah and Kumail (2014–2016)
- Men in Black: The Series (1997–2000)
- Messyness (2021–2022)
- Metalocalypse (2006–2013)
- Mickey Mouse (2013–2019; 2020–2023)
- Mickey Mouse Clubhouse (2006–2016; 2025–)
- Mickey Mouse Funhouse (2021–2025)
- Mickey Mouse Mixed-Up Adventures (2017–2021)
- Middlemost Post (2021–2022)
- The Midnight Gospel (2020)
- The Mighty B! (2008–2011)
- Mighty Magiswords (2016–2019)
- Mighty Med (2013–2015)
- Mike Judge Presents: Tales from the Tour Bus (2017–2018)
- Mike Tyson Mysteries (2014–2020)
- Milo Murphy's Law (2016–2019)
- The Milton Berle Show (1948–1956)
- Minoriteam (2005–2006)
- Mixels (2014–2016)
- Mongo Wrestling Alliance (2011)
- Most Extreme Elimination Challenge (2003–2007)
- Monsters at Work (2021–2024)
- Monsters vs. Aliens (2013–2014)
- The Moxy Show (1993–1995)
- ¡Mucha Lucha! (2002–2005)
- Muppet Babies (1984–1991; 2018–2022)
- My Big Fat Obnoxious Boss (2004)
- My Big Fat Obnoxious Fiance (2004)
- My Gym Partner's a Monkey (2005–2008)
- My Life as a Teenage Robot (2003–2009)
- Nathan For You (2013–2017)
- New Looney Tunes (2015–2020)
- The New Scooby-Doo Movies (1972–1973)
- The New Scooby and Scrappy-Doo Show (1983–1984)
- The New Yogi Bear Show (1988)
- The News Is the News (1983)
- Newsreaders (2013–2015)
- Nicky, Ricky, Dicky & Dawn (2014–2018)
- Night Stand with Dick Dietrick (1995–1997)
- The Nightly Show with Larry Wilmore (2015–2016)
- No, You Shut Up! (2013–2016)
- Not Safe with Nikki Glaser (2016)
- NTSF:SD:SUV:: (2011–2013)
- Off Centre (2001–2002)
- Off the Air (2011–)
- OK K.O.! Let's Be Heroes (2017–2019)
- Okay, Mother (1948–1951)
- The Opposition with Jordan Klepper (2017–2018)
- Our Flag Means Death (2022–2023)
- Over the Garden Wall (2014)
- The Owl House (2020–2023)

=== P-T ===
- Pac-Man (1982–1983)
- The Penguins of Madagascar (2008–2015)
- The Pete Holmes Show (2013–2014)
- The Peter Potamus Show (1964–1966)
- Phineas and Ferb (2007–2015; 2010–2011; 2025–)
- Pig Goat Banana Cricket (2015–2018)
- Pixie & Dixie and Mr. Jinks (1958–1961)
- Platonic (2023–)
- Politically Incorrect (1993–2002)
- Postcards from Buster (2004–2012)
- The Powerpuff Girls (1998–2005; 2016–2019)
- The Pradeeps of Pittsburgh (2024)
- PrankStars (2011)
- Premium Blend (1997–2005)
- The President Show (2017)
- Pretty Freekin Scary (2023)
- Primetime Glick (2001–2003)
- The Problem Solverz (2011–2013)
- Problematic with Moshe Kasher (2017)
- Project Mc2 (2015–2017)
- A Pup Named Scooby-Doo (1988–1991)
- Queer Duck (2000–2002)
- The Quick Draw McGraw Show (1959–1961)
- Real Time with Bill Maher (2003–)
- Reality Bites Back (2008)
- The Red Buttons Show (1952–1955)
- Red Eye (2007–2017)
- The Red Skelton Show (1951–1971)
- Reed Between the Lines (2011; 2015)
- Regular Show (2010–2017; 2026–)
- The Ren & Stimpy Show (1991–1996; 2003; 2024)
- The Replacements (2006–2009)
- Review (2014–2017)
- Richie Rich (1980–1984)
- Ridiculousness (2011–)
- Robotomy (2010–2011)
- Rocko's Modern Life (1993–1996; 2019 Netflix special)
- Rock Paper Scissors (2024–2026)
- Rowan and Martin's Laugh-In (1968–1973)
- Rugrats (1991–2004; 2003–2008; 2021–2026)
- The Rundown with Robin Thede (2017–2018)
- Running Point (2025–)
- Sanjay and Craig (2013–2016)
- Santa Clarita Diet (2017–2019)
- Saturday Morning All Star Hits! (2021)
- Saturdays (2023)
- Saul of the Mole Men (2007)
- Sausage Party: Foodtopia (2024–)
- Scare Tactics (2003–2013)
- School of Rock (2016–2018)
- Scooby-Doo, Where Are You! (1969–1970)
- Scooby-Doo and Guess Who? (2019–2021)
- The Scooby-Doo Show (1976–1978)
- Scooby-Doo and Scrappy-Doo (1979–1980; 1980–1982)
- Scooby-Doo! Mystery Incorporated (2010–2013)
- Scream Queens (2015–2016)
- Sealab 2021 (2000–2005)
- Secret Mountain Fort Awesome (2011–2012; 2013–2017)
- Secret Squirrel (1965–1966; 1993)
- Separation Anxiety (2016)
- Seriously Funny Kids (2011)
- Shaggy & Scooby-Doo Get a Clue! (2006–2008)
- Sheep in the Big City (2000–2002)
- The Shivering Truth (2018–2020)
- Shorties Watchin' Shorties (2004)
- Sid the Science Kid (2008–2013)
- Side Hustle (2020–2022)
- Skunked TV (2004–2005)
- Slacker Cats (2007–2009)
- Space Ghost Coast to Coast (1994–2008)
- Spaceballs: The Animated Series (2008)
- Speed Buggy (1973)
- Splash and Bubbles (2016–2018)
- SpongeBob SquarePants (1999–; 2021–2024; 2021–)
- Spy Groove (2000)
- Squirrel Boy (2006–2007)
- Stanley (2001–2004)
- Star Falls (2018)
- Star Trek: Lower Decks (2020–2024)
- Star vs. the Forces of Evil (2015–2019)
- Station Zero (1999)
- Steven Universe (2013–2019; 2019–2020)
- Stick (2025–)
- Straight Plan for the Gay Man (2004)
- Strange Planet (2023)
- Stripperella (2003–2004)
- Stuck in the Middle (2016–2018)
- The Studio (2025–)
- Stumble (2025–2026)
- Summer Camp Island (2018–2023)
- The Super Hero Squad Show (2009–2011)
- The Super Mario Bros. Super Show! (1989)
- Superjail! (2007–2014)
- Sydney to the Max (2019–2021)
- The Sylvester & Tweety Mysteries (1995–2002)
- T.U.F.F. Puppy (2010–2015)
- Tak and the Power of Juju (2007–2009)
- Tales from the Crypt (1989–1996)
- Tattletales (1974–1978)
- Taz-Mania (1991–1995)
- Teacher's Pet (2000–2002)
- Teen Titans Go! (2013–)
- Tender Touches (2017–2020)
- Thank God You're Here (2007)
- That Girl Lay Lay (2021–2024)
- This Is Hot 97 (2014)
- Thomas & Friends: All Engines Go (2021–2025)
- Three Busy Debras (2020–2022)
- ThunderCats Roar (2020)
- The Thundermans (2013–2018; 2024 movie; 2025–)
- Tig n' Seek (2020–2022)
- Tigtone (2018–2020)
- Tim & Eric's Bedtime Stories (2013–2017)
- Time Squad (2001–2003)
- Time Traveling Bong (2016)
- Timon & Pumbaa (1995–1999)
- Tiny Toon Adventures (1990–1995; 1992; 2023–2025)
- Tom & Jerry Kids (1990–1994)
- The Tom and Jerry Comedy Show (1980)
- Tom and Jerry in New York (2021)
- The Tom and Jerry Show (1975)
- The Tom and Jerry Show (2014–2021)
- Tom and Jerry Tales (2006–2008)
- Too Much (2025)
- Tooning Out the News (2020–2023)
- Tosh.0 (2009–2020)
- Totally Biased with W. Kamau Bell (2012–2013)
- Totally Funny Animals (2024–)
- Totally Funny Kids (2024–)
- Totally Tooned In (1999–2000)
- Totally Weird and Funny (2023)
- Tropical Cop Tales (2018–2019)
- Trust Me, I'm a Game Show Host (2013)
- TruTV's Top Funniest (2013–2015)
- Tutenstein (2003–2008)
- TV's Bloopers & Practical Jokes (1984–1993)
- Twisted Metal (2023–)

=== U-Z ===
- Unikitty! (2017–2020)
- Upload with Shaquille O'Neal (2013)
- Vampirina: Teenage Vampire (2025–)
- VeggieTales (1993–2022)
- The Venture Bros. (2003–2018)
- Wacky Races (1968–1969; 1969–1970; 2017–2019)
- Wally Gator (1962–1963)
- Wander Over Yonder (2013–2016)
- Warped! (2022)
- We Bare Bears (2015–2019; 2022–)
- Web Therapy (2011–2015)
- The Weird Al Show (1997)
- Weird City (2019)
- What We Do in the Shadows (2019–2024)
- What's New, Scooby-Doo? (2002–2006)
- Whatever Happened to... Robot Jones? (2002–2003)
- Where My Dogs At? (2006)
- Will the Real Jerry Lewis Please Sit Down (1970–1971)
- The Wilton North Report (1987–1988)
- Wipeout (2008–2014; 2021–2025)
- Wishbone (1995–1997)
- World's Dumbest... (2008–2014)
- World's Funniest Animals (2020–2024)
- WordWorld (2007–2011)
- Wow! Wow! Wubbzy! (2006–2010)
- The Wubbulous World of Dr. Seuss (1996–1998)
- The X's (2005–2006)
- Yo Yogi! (1991)
- The Yogi Bear Show (1961–1962)
- Yogi's Gang (1973)
- Yogi's Space Race (1978)
- Yogi's Treasure Hunt (1985–1988)
- The Z-Suite (2025–)
- Zombie College (2000–2001)
- Zootopia+ (2022)
- The Zula Patrol (2005–2008)

== Co-productions ==
- Alvinnn!!! and the Chipmunks (2015–2023)
- The Amazing World of Gumball (2011–2019; 2025–)
- Angela Anaconda (1999–2001)
- Arthur (1996–2022)
- Atomic Betty (2004–2008)
- Back to the Future (1991–1992)
- The Backyardigans (2004–2013)
- Blaze and the Monster Machines (2014–2025)
- Beetlejuice (1989–1991)
- Bromwell High (2005)
- The Brothers Grunt (1994–1995)
- Bubble Guppies (2011–2023)
- The Cat in the Hat Knows a Lot About That! (2010–2018)
- Clone High (2002–2003; 2023–2024)
- Cloudy with a Chance of Meatballs (2017–2018)
- Cosmic Quantum Ray (2007–2008)
- Cyberchase (2002–present)
- Darcy's Wild Life (2004–2006)
- Ed, Edd n Eddy (1999–2009)
- Edgar & Ellen (2007–2008)
- Family Dog (1993)
- Fraggle Rock (1983–1987; 1987; 2013–2018; 2022)
- Fugget About It (2012–2016)
- The Funky Phantom (1971–1972)
- The Garfield Show (2008–2016)
- Glenn Martin, DDS (2009–2011)
- Growing Up Creepie (2006–2008)
- Iggy Arbuckle (2007)
- Inspector Gadget (1983–1986; 2015–2017)
- John Callahan's Quads! (2001–2002)
- Johnny Test (2005–2014; 2021–2022)
- Let's Go Luna! (2018–2022)
- Littlest Pet Shop (2012–2016)
- Littlest Pet Shop: A World of Our Own (2018)
- The Magic School Bus (1994–1997; 2017–2020)
- Martha Speaks (2008–2014)
- Mike, Lu, & Og (1999–2001)
- Minty (1998)
- Molly of Denali (2019–present)
- Mother Up! (2013–2014)
- Mr. Meaty (2005–2009)
- My Dad the Rock Star (2003–2004)
- My Little Pony: Friendship Is Magic (2010–2019; 2020–2021)
- The Mysteries of Alfred Hedgehog (2010)
- Nature Cat (2015–2024)
- Odd Squad (2014–)
- Paper Port (2015–2017)
- Peep and the Big Wide World (2004–2011)
- Pound Puppies (2010–2013)
- Ricky Sprocket: Showbiz Boy (2007–2009)
- Shimmer and Shine (2015–2020)
- The Smurfs (1981–1989; 2021–)
- Snorks (1984–1989)
- Sonic Boom (2014–2017)
- Student Bodies (1997–2000)
- Super Mario World (1990–1991)
- Super Wings (2014–present)
- Time Warp Trio (2005–2006)
- The Tofus (2004–2005)
- Total DramaRama (2018–2023)
- Totally Spies! (2001–2008; 2013–2015; 2024–2025)
- Transformers: Rescue Bots (2011–2016; 2018–2021)
- Tripping the Rift (2004–2005)
- The Troop (2009–2013)
- The Twisted Whiskers Show (2009–2010)
- Undergrads (2001)
- The Upside Down Show (2006)
- Welcome to the Wayne (2017–2019)
- What's with Andy? (2001–2007)
- Wild Kratts (2011–)
- Yo Gabba Gabba! (2007–2015)
- Zoboomafoo (1999–2001)

== See also ==
- Animated sitcom
- British comedy
- Comedy
- Comedy film
- Farce
- List of BBC sitcoms
- List of comedy-drama television series
- List of romantic comedy television series
- List of single-camera situation comedies
- List of sketch comedy television series
- List of theatrical comedies
- List of radio comedies
- List of situation comedies
- List of teen sitcoms
- Lists of comedy films
- Sitcom
