= Totally Funny =

Totally Funny may also refer to:

- Totally Funny Animals, an American clip show television series
- Totally Funny Kids, an American clip show television series
