= Ron Funches =

American comedian and actor (born 1983)

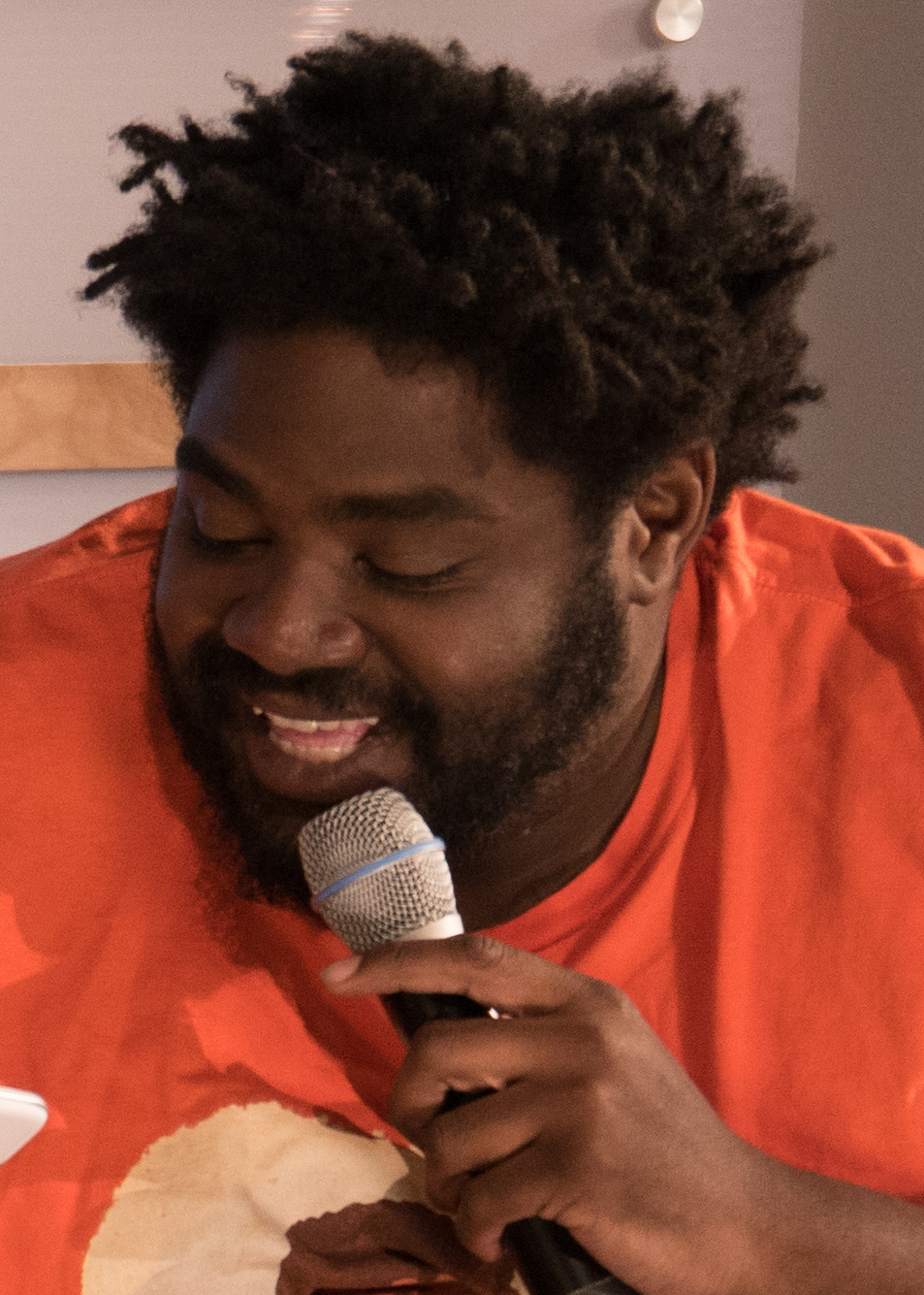
- Funches in 2015
- Born: Ronald Kyle Funches; March 12, 1983 (age 43); Carson, California, U.S.
- Spouse: Christina Dawn (m. 2020; div. 2022)
- Children: 2

Comedy career
- Years active: 2006–present
- Medium: Stand-up; television; film
- Genres: Observational comedy; black comedy; surreal humor; insult comedy; sarcasm; satire; deadpan
- Subjects: African-American culture; American politics; human behavior; pop culture; current events; autism; fatherhood; marijuana
- Website: ronfunches.com

Ronald Kyle Funches (born March 12, 1983) is an American comedian and actor. From 2014 to 2016, Funches starred as a regular on the NBC series Undateable, and in 2015, began performing as a voice actor on such series as BoJack Horseman, The Adventures of Puss in Boots, and Adventure Time. He subsequently voiced Cooper in the animated film Trolls (2016). He also had guest-starring roles on a number of television series, including Transparent (2016), Black-ish (2017), and reprised the role of Cooper in the Trolls spin-off series Trolls: The Beat Goes On! (2018).

Beginning in 2019, he began voicing the roles of King Shark in the DC Comics TV series Harley Quinn and Fox in the TBS/Adult Swim TV series Final Space. In 2020, Funches again reprised the role of Cooper in the sequel film Trolls World Tour. Starting in 2020, Funches voiced Ron on the Netflix series Hoops. In 2021, Funches began voicing Kevin in the FX series Poorly Drawn Lines.

== Early life ==
Ronald Kyle Funches was born in Carson, California, but spent his early life with his mother and sister in the Woodlawn neighborhood of Chicago, Illinois. Funches' mother was a social worker. When he was 13 years old, he moved to Salem, Oregon, to live with his father, who was employed there as a pipefitter. He began his comedy career in Portland, Oregon, at age 23. After moving to Los Angeles in 2012, he began appearing as a guest on several comedy series, including @midnight, Mulaney, and Kroll Show.

He graduated from Douglas McKay High School in Salem, where he took English courses, and was inspired by writers such as Molière, J. D. Salinger, William Faulkner, and Erich Maria Remarque. After high school, Funches relocated to Portland, Oregon, where he worked a variety of jobs, including at a bank call center and as a clerk at a Grocery Outlet store.

== Career ==
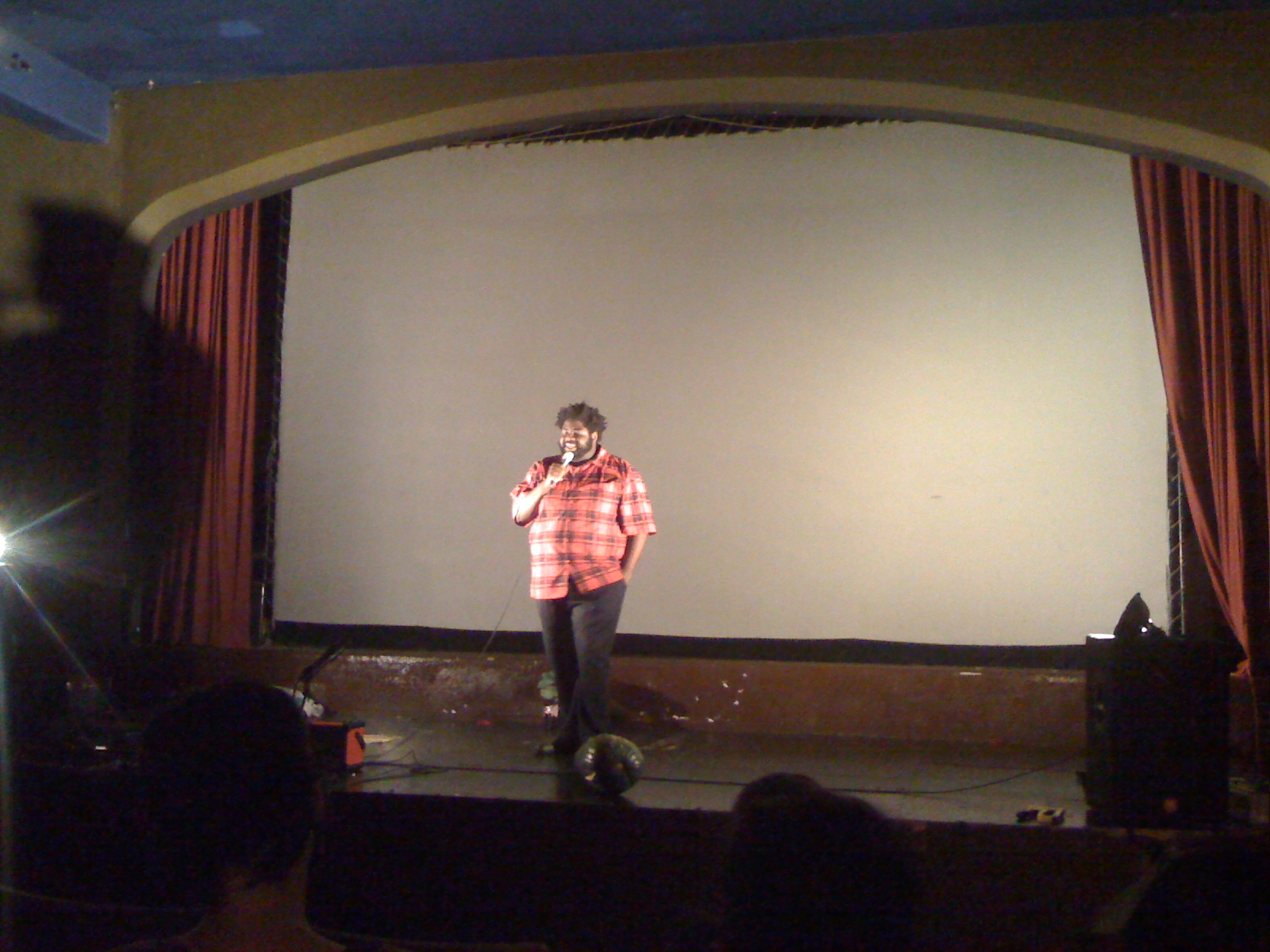
Funches performing in 2010 at the Clinton Street Theater, Portland, Oregon

Funches began pursuing stand-up comedy at the age of 23 in Portland. After having a small role on an episode of Portlandia in 2011, he relocated to Los Angeles in 2012. Beginning in 2013, he was a regular panelist on the comedy series @midnight, had a recurring role in the comedy series Crash & Bernstein (2013), and worked as a writer on The Eric Andre Show and Comedy Central's The Half Hour (2014). Also in 2014, Funches performed as a regular comic panelist on Chelsea Lately.

Beginning in 2014, Funches appeared in several episodes of Drunk History, and in 2015, performed numerous guest-starring voice roles on the animated series BoJack Horseman, The Adventures of Puss in Boots, and Adventure Time.

Funches subsequently starred as Shelly on the NBC comedy series Undateable from 2014 until the series' conclusion in 2016. Funches also had a supporting role in the 2015 comedy film Get Hard.

In 2016, he voiced the role of Cooper in the animated film Trolls, Also in 2016, Funches guest-starred on numerous series, such as Another Period, Take My Wife, and Transparent.

Beginning in 2019, he began voicing the role of King Shark in the DC Comics TV series Harley Quinn and the role of Fox in the TBS series Final Space. He played the recurring character "Funchy" in season 3 (2019) of the CBS sitcom Man with a Plan. Funches reprised his role of Cooper in the Trolls sequel, Trolls World Tour (2020). Funches also voiced Shag Rugg on the 2021 HBO Max television series Jellystone! and Rock on the 2024 Nickelodeon television series Rock Paper Scissors.

In 2021, Funches hosted a spin-off of the Food Network series Chopped—Chopped 420—for Discovery+.

Since 2022, Funches played the cousin of Maya Rudolph's character on Loot.

== Influences ==
Funches has cited Lucille Ball, Dave Chappelle, and Mitch Hedberg as major influences on his comedy. Commenting on Ball, he said: "I Love Lucy was kind of my introduction to the world of comedy in general. And when you look at the history of Lucille Ball, and the work that she did for women in Hollywood, having her own production company, and also showing an interracial marriage on TV in the '50s, to me, she's just one of my biggest influences overall as a human being. That's what it means to be a professional and what it means to stand up for yourself even though interracial marriage has nothing to do with a career."

== Personal life ==
Funches had his first son, Malcolm, when he was 20 years old. He mentions Malcolm's autism in his standup routine and welcomes fans sharing their stories with him. He married Christina Dawn in August 2020. They had a son, Funches's second child, in 2022. In October 2022, they separated. They are now divorced. He has been divorced twice.

Funches is an avid video gamer and wrestling fan, having taken classes at a wrestling school for a few months. Eventually Funches made his in-ring debut at GCW in September 2021 in a match against Tony Deppen that featured Paul Scheer as his cornerman and interference from Danhausen. In August 2022 he started his wrestling podcast One Fall with Ron Funches.

He told Adam Carolla that he had once weighed 360 pounds (160 kg). Funches said that over a few years he lost around 140 pounds (64 kg).

After an appearance on the fourth season of the reality TV program The Traitors, he felt isolated and misunderstood because he felt that while he presented as a person who was happy and excited to be in the show, he found it odd that his fellow contestants were asking if he actually wanted to be on the show. After social media followers who identified as autistic, identified positively with Funches experience on the show, he decided to get tested for an official autism diagnosis. In April 2026 he appeared on the Easterseals' podcast Everything You Know About Disability Is Wrong to discuss what his life has been like now that he has been officially diagnosed with autism.

== Filmography ==
=== Film ===
Year	Title	Role	Notes	Ref.
2014	Night Night with Ron Funches	Himself	Writer; short film for Funny or Die	
2014	Night Night with Ron Funches Ep 2	Himself	Writer; short film for Funny or Die	
2015	Movie Mind Machine	Ron	Short film	
2015	Get Hard	Jojo		
2016	Donald Trump's The Art of the Deal: The Movie	Member of The Fat Boys		
2016	Trolls	Cooper	Voice role	
2017	Once Upon a Time in Venice	Mocha		
2017	Killing Hasselhoff	Bill		
2019	Jexi	Craig		
2019	Noelle	Elf Mortimer		
2019	6 Underground	Blaine's cousin / the funeral speaker		
2019	Lucky	Sammy	Voice role	
2020	Sylvie's Love	Tank		
2020	Underlings	Sal	Voice role	
2020	Trolls World Tour	Cooper	Voice role	
2020	The One and Only Ivan	Murphy	Voice role	
2020	Golden Arm	Carl		
2021	Dark Web: Cicada 3301	Avi		
2022	Cheaper by the Dozen	Seth's Neighbor		
2022	Naked Mole Rat Gets Dressed: The Underground Rock Experience	Les Pants	Voice role	
2023	80 for Brady	Chip		
2023	Under the Boardwalk	Anemone	Voice role	
2023	Trolls Band Together	Cooper	Voice cameo	
2023	Good Burger 2	Jimathy		
2024	Inside Out 2	Bloofy	Voice role; also performed "Bloofy's House Theme Song"	
2026	Hexed †	TBA	Voice role	

=== Television ===
Year	Title	Role	Notes	Ref.
2011	Portlandia	Baseball Player	Episode: "Baseball"	
2013	Crash & Bernstein	Roland	5 episodes	
2013	Dead Kevin	Homeless King	Episode: "How Not to Rob a Liquor Store"	
2013	New Girl	Street Musician	Episode: "First Date"	
2014	Mulaney	Rodney aka Tall Tucan	Episode: "It's a Wonderful Home Alone"	
2014	The Eric Andre Show	—N/a	Writer; Episode: "Seth Rogen; Asa Akira"	
2014	Selfie	Wayne	Episode: "Traumatic Party Stress Disorder"	
2014	The Half Hour	Himself	Stand-up special	
2014	Bob's Burgers	Horseplay / Patrick	2 episodes Voice role	
2014	Enlisted	Private Huggins	Episode: "Pilot"	
2014–2015	Kroll Show	Himself	Actor: 4 episodes Writer: 11 episodes	
2014–2016	Undateable	Shelly	36 episodes	
2014–2016	Drunk History	Various	3 episodes	
2015	Cougar Town	Marty	Episode: "To Find a Friend"	
2015	BoJack Horseman	Levi	Episode: "Chickens"; Voice role	
2015	The Adventures of Puss in Boots	Fartholomew Fishflinger	Episode: "Mouse"; Voice role	
2015	Adventure Time	The Fool	2 episodes in Stakes; Voice role	
2016	Great Minds with Dan Harmon	Idi Amin	Episode: "Idi Amin"	
2016	Another Period	Hamish's Cellmate	2 episodes	
2016	The Lion Guard	Ajabu	Episode: "The Imaginary Okapi"; Voice role	
2016	Harmonquest	Captain Ribs Sanchez	Episode: "Across the Dernum Sea"	
2016	Cupcake Wars	Himself	Episode: "Josie and the Pussycats"	
2016	Home: Adventures with Tip & Oh	Sharzod	45 episodes Voice role	
2016	Take My Wife	Ron	Episode: "Headliner"	
2016	Transparent	Fredrick	Episode: "Elizah"	
2017	Drive Share	Nicky Nitro	Episode: "The Light Source"	
2017	Black-ish	Ledarius	Episode: "I'm a Survivor"	
2017	The Goldbergs	Froy	2 episodes	
2017	Powerless	Ron	12 episodes	
2017	We Bare Bears	Wyatt	Episode: "Road Trip"; Voice role	
2017	Future Man	Ray	Episode: "Pilot"	
2017	Trolls Holiday	Cooper	TV special Voice role	
2017	Curb Your Enthusiasm	Bus Passenger	Episode: "Namaste"	
2018	A.P. Bio	Hans	2 episodes	
2018	Talk Show The Game Show	Himself	1 episode	
2018	OK K.O.! Let's Be Heroes	Sparko	4 episodes Voice role	
2018–2019	Trolls: The Beat Goes On!	Cooper	65 episodes Voice role	
2019	Infinity Train	Khaki Bottoms	Episode: "The Ball Pit Car"; Voice role	
2019	Man with a Plan	Funchy	3 episodes	
2019	Twelve Forever	Manquin	25 episodes Voice role	
2019–2021	Final Space	Fox	Voice role 18 episodes	
2019–present	Harley Quinn	King Shark	23 episodes Voice role	
2019	Ron Funches: Giggle Fit	Himself	Stand-up special	
2019–2022	Crank Yankers	Himself	2 episodes Voice role	
2020	Central Park	Danny	Episode: "Squirrel, Interrupted"; Voice role	
2020	Room 104	Charlie	Episode: "Oh, Harry!"	
2020	Hoops	Ron	10 episodes Voice role	
2020	The Last Blockbuster	Himself		
2020	Nice One!	Himself	Host, writer	
2020	Top Secret Videos	Himself	Host, writer	
2020	Match Game	Himself	Episode: "Joel McHale, Amanda Seales, Ron Funches, Ana Gasteyer, Rob Huebel, Nikki Glaser"	
2020–2022	Trolls: TrollsTopia	Cooper	52 episodes Voice role	
2021–2025	The Great North	Jerry Shaw	Recurring; Voice role	
2021–2025	Jellystone!	Shag Rugg, Astro, Hong Kong Phooey	Voice role	
2021	Nailed It!	Himself/Judge	Episode: "Burbank State Fair"	
2021	Chopped 420	Himself/host	5 episodes	
2021–2022	Inside Job	Mothman		
2021	Poorly Drawn Lines	Kevin		
2021	Trolls: Holiday in Harmony	Cooper	TV special Voice role	
2021	A Tale Dark & Grimm	Jacob	Voice role	
2022–present	Loot	Howard	Main role	
2023–2024	Frog and Toad	Raccoon	Voice role	
2024–2026	Rock Paper Scissors	Rock	Voice role	
2024	After Midnight	Himself	Episode #26	
2024	Ariel	Delfino	Episode: "The Singing Dolphin"; Voice role	
2025	Celebrity Weakest Link	Contestant	Episode: "8 Degress of Jane"	
2025	Krapopolis	Colin	Voice, episode: "Vengeance Will Be Nine"	
2026	The Traitors	Contestant	Contestant	
2026	Crowd Control	Contestant	Episode: "Kids Are Trash"	

== Other accomplishments ==
- Attack! Pro Wrestling
  - Attack! 24:7 Championship (1 time)
- DDT Pro-Wrestling
  - Ironman Heavymetalweight Championship (1 time)
