= FishBowl Worldwide Media =

Independent production company

Fishbowl Worldwide Media LLC
- Company type: Private
- Industry: Production company Television production Web & Digital production Licensing
- Founded: 2010; 16 years ago
- Founder: Vin Di Bona
- Headquarters: Los Angeles, California, United States
- Key people: Vin Di Bona (Chairman); Beth Greenwald (President)
- Website: www.fbwmedia.com

Fishbowl Worldwide Media is an independent production company with a focus on transmedia development and production. Founded in 2010 and headquartered in Los Angeles, California, it was founded by Vin Di Bona (a television producer known for MacGyver, Entertainment Tonight, and America's Funniest Home Videos) and Bruce Gersh (previously senior vice president, Strategy and Operations of Intellectual Property at the William Morris Agency).

== About the company ==
FishBowl Worldwide Media utilizes partnerships with other entertainment companies (NBC, Fox, Discovery Channel, MTV and truTV) as well as its own internal teams to create original content for film, television, digital platforms, and several brands. FishBowl operates by turning each of its projects into specific brands aimed at engaging its audience. In 2012, Fishbowl launched two YouTube channels called Petsami and CuteWinFail. Fishbowl also manages a curated library of cleared, user-generated content for use by third parties.

== List of FishBowl Worldwide Media productions ==
=== Television shows ===
- Offbeat
- Beyond Repair
- Learn Just Enough to get Laid
- Everything you know is Pong
- Upload with Shaquille O'Neal
- America's Funniest Home Videos: Animal Edition
- Totally Funny Animals
- Totally Funny Kids

=== Digital networks ===
- Petsami
- AFV

=== Digital shows ===
- Ultimate Surprises
- CuteWinFail
- Lindo Victoria Fracaso
- Stunt Nation
