= Tacarra Williams =

American comedian (born 1984)

- Born: April 5, 1984 (age 42); New York City, U.S.
- Children: 3

Comedy career
- Years active: 2011–present
- Medium: Stand-up; television
- Subjects: Single motherhood; family; dating; divorce
- Website: tacarra.com

Tacarra Williams (born April 5, 1984) is an American comedian, actress, and television personality. She was the runner-up on the stand-up reality competition series Bring the Funny in 2019 and, as of 2024, hosts the CW television series Totally Funny Kids.

== Early life and career ==
Tacarra Williams was born on April 5, 1984 in Belize and raised in the South Bronx in public housing. She has seven siblings—two older and five younger—one of whom, Tamika, is her twin. She was inspired to pursue stand-up comedy after a breakup, when she auditioned for a role in a series where the casting directors suggested she try it and scheduled her to perform for the first time in Harlem. She then moved to Los Angeles to look for opportunities as a comedian, where she worked as a life skills coach for inmates at prisons throughout Southern California.

Williams appeared in the Kevin Hart-hosted comedy special The Next Level in 2018 and as a guest star on the sitcom South Side in 2019, where she played Jalitha. Williams competed on the 2019 stand-up competition television series Bring the Funny, on which she was the runner-up. She then embarked on her national Life After Divorce stand-up tour in late 2019. Williams co-hosted the clip show television series So Dumb It's Criminal with Snoop Dogg, which ran in 2022. In early 2024, Williams accompanied comedian Katt Williams on his Dark Matter Tour. She also, as of 2024, hosts The CW's clip show television series Totally Funny Kids, which premiered in February 2024.

== Personal life and public image ==
Williams has three children. Her jokes often revolve around her children, being a single mother, and dating. Renaldo Christopher, for BET, wrote that her comedy was "family-oriented yet edgy and realistic". Meghan Giannotta of amNewYork called her brand of comedy "mom comedy" and described it as "relatable" and "single-mom-friendly".

== Filmography ==
=== Television ===
Year	Title	Role	Notes	Ref.
2018	Kevin Hart Presents: The Next Level	Herself		
2019	South Side	Jalitha	Episode: "Mongolian Curly"	
2019	Bring the Funny	Contestant	Runner-up	
2021	Chopped 420	Judge		
2022	So Dumb It's Criminal	Co-host		
2024	Totally Funny Kids	Host		
