= Kanaban Graphics =

Japanese animation company

Kanaban Graphics Ltd. (有限会社 カナバングラフィックス, Yūgen gaisha Kanaban Gurafikkusu) is a Japanese animation studio founded in 1998 or 1999 that made content for MTV Japan.

== Works ==
- Hal & Bons (2002)
- Usavich (2006–15)
- New Hal & Bons (2006)
- Petite Eva (2007)
- Yan Yan Machiko (2009)
- Inazma Delivery (2017)
- Bromance (2017, possibly; co-production with Ubisoft)
