= Upload with Shaquille O'Neal =

American comedy television series

- Godfrey, Shaquille O'Neal, and Gary Owen (from left)
- Genre: Comedy
- Starring: Shaquille O'Neal; Gary Owen; Godfrey; Rachel Feinstein
- Country of origin: United States
- Original language: English
- No. of seasons: 1
- No. of episodes: 10

Production
- Executive producers: Beth Greenwald; Bruce Gersh; Colin Smeeton; Greg Heller; Mike Gibbons; Mike Parris; Perry Rogers; Shaquille O'Neal; Susan Levison; Vin Di Bona
- Running time: 22 minutes
- Production companies: FishBowl Worldwide Media; Shaq Entertainment

Original release
- Network: truTV
- Release: February 21 – May 2, 2013

Upload with Shaquille O'Neal is an American comedy television series starring Shaquille O'Neal. It premiered on February 21, 2013, on truTV. It was announced in April 2013 that truTV has ordered an additional six episodes. New episodes were supposed to begin airing on February 26, 2014, but were never released.

== Premise ==
The series is hosted by Shaq with co-hosts Gary Owen, Godfrey and Rachel Feinstein as they review and comment on some of the funniest videos on the internet. The series also shows the hosts creating their own viral videos, pranking others and making parodies of recent pop culture stories. Each week also features a different guest comedian.

== Episodes ==
No.	Guest	Original release date	US viewers (millions)
1	Loni Love	February 21, 2013	1.31
2	Arnez J	February 28, 2013	0.77
3	Eliza Skinner	March 7, 2013	0.69
4	Michelle Buteau	March 14, 2013	0.62
5	Aries Spears	March 28, 2013	0.71
6	Ali Wong	April 4, 2013	0.43
7	Baron Vaughn	April 11, 2013	0.55
8	Dillon Garcia	April 18, 2013	0.76
9	Tiffany Haddish	April 25, 2013	0.30
10	Al Jackson	May 2, 2013	0.59
