= Hello World Jamaica =

Hello World Jamaica was one of the first Caribbean children's programs to represent the Rastafarian community. The series was created and produced by Mary Collins and aired in Jamaica twice weekly from 2004–2006 on CVM Television. The age group the program appealed most to was ages 6–12 due to the simplicity and entertaining nature of the songs and music videos and the fun and valuable aspects of the science and art segments that ran for approximately 26 minutes plus commercial time.

== Characters ==
The original show was made up of seven main characters with and addition of the "Paradise Kids" (local children from each area given the opportunity to be on the program). The main character was represented by a proud and upstanding Jamaican from the Rastafarian community. Ragga Boo Boo or Ragga as he 's known by good friends, takes life as Jah has intended it to be and has mainly wise sayings, with some mild humor to pass to those who shop at his market stall. Ragga is joined by the Ackee Twins, two odd and misplaced fruits who do their best to remain friends with their keeper. Irie Goat, an ol'goat who likes to hang around and might as well be a permanent fixture as well as Brown Dog who offers up the letter or word of the day which leads the intro to the Paradise Kids of each week's episode. Characters such as Patoo, the animated owl, lend a hoot to the kids trying to figure out clues pertaining to subject matter and occasionally Anna Conda Boa the tongue-tied TV reporter, stops by somewhere new to report. Crystal Croaker 'drops in-to' the nicest places to introduce you to the nicest people.

== International ==
After having two successful years airing on Caribbean television, Hello World Television series continued to film around the world, Ireland, Switzerland, France and the UK – specifically where it was presented to a number of representatives at the Show Commotions Children's Media conference in 2007. Hello World Jamaica had success with a number of items including merchandise of its main characters images on clothing, and books followed. The main book, Instruments Episode one, being available exclusively in Jamaica as part of a sponsorship program for education in schools with celebrity guest appearance Dwight Pinkney appearing in the book. A comic strip ran in the second largest paper of Jamaica, The Jamaica Observer for a number of weeks. In 2009 additional Hello World Series books, " How Crocodile Got His Nickname" and " Jesse was Afraid of the Dark" made their debut at the Bologna Media Fair, Italy. Hello World Jamaica has been the creative inspiration and is the original children's television series to include Rastafarian and traditional Caribbean influence in its collection.

== Celebrity appearances ==
- Damian Marley
- Akon
- Tami Chynn
- Ernie Smith
- Rikrok
- Dwight Pinkney
- Claston Bernard
- T.O.K.
- Luciano
- Lady Saw
- Morgan Heritage

== Production ==
The series and characters created by Mary Collins. Co-editing and puppet mastery contracted to Sandra Bacher. Songs written by Mary Collins, co-production Grub Cooper.
