= The Kids International Show =

1982 BBC television series

- Genre: Comedy, Music
- Directed by: Ernest Maxin
- Starring: Kids International; Paul Charles; Kelly Sliver; Alyn Ainsworth; The Three Degrees; Charlie Smithers; Bill Owen; Peter Sallis; Brian Wilde; Wayne Dobson
- Country of origin: United Kingdom
- No. of series: 1
- No. of episodes: 2

Production
- Producer: Ernest Maxin
- Running time: 35, 30 minutes
- Production company: BBC

Original release
- Network: BBC One
- Release: 31 May – 24 December 1982

The Kids International Show is a 1982 television mini-series about a group of international kids. The series was produced by the BBC and broadcast on BBC One from 31 May 1982 to 24 December 1982. The series also featured guest stars such as The Three Degrees, Charlie Smithers, Wayne Dobson, Alyn Ainsworth and his Orchestra. As well as the three main characters from Last of the Summer Wine those being Compo, Clegg and Foggy.

== Plot summary ==
The show follows a group of talented children from all nations who are trying to entertain people with their songs and dancing skills in order to have more human relationships with adults.

== Cast ==
- Kids International as Themselves
- Paul Charles as Kids International Member
- Kelly Silver as Kids International Performer
- Alyn Ainsworth as Themselves
- The Three Degrees as Themselves
- Charlie Smithers as Self
- Bill Owen as Compo
- Peter Sallis as Clegg
- Brian Wilde as Foggy
- Wayne Dobson as Self

== Episodes ==
1. "Episode 1.1" (31 May 1982)
2. "Episode 1.2" (23 December 1982)

== Production ==
The series was also quite similar to the BBC series The Les Dawson Show mainly from series 2 of the series. The second series of the show featured a group of talented international kids performing who would later appear in The Kids International Show.

== Reception ==
The series ran for only one series with only two episodes that aired from 31 May 1982 to 24 December 1982 and both of them premiered on BBC One. The second episode of the series did end up getting rebroadcast the next day on BBC One Wales after its first broadcast on BBC One. It's unknown if the series was intended to have only two episodes or there was gonna be more episodes made for the series. Both of the episodes exist fully intact in the BBC Archives. Episode one exists as a Digital Betacam copy of a D3 digital videotape and episode two exists as a digital Betacam videotape. However both of the episodes are currently not available for the public to view.

== Critic reviews ==
The series received great positive reviews from critics. One critic described the series as amazing entertainment from the celebrities and the kids from around the world.
