= Usavich =

Japanese animated series (2006–2015)

Usavich (ウサビッチ, Usabitchi; from usagi (うさぎ, rabbit), Japanese for rabbit, with "vich" to make it a Russian patronymic) is a series of animated short films created for MTV Japan by Satoshi Tomioka and his studio Kanaban Graphics from 2006 to 2015. It is about an odd pair of rabbits imprisoned in a Soviet prison in 1961. The first season shows the absurd everyday occurrences of the two rabbits' prison life, and the subsequent seasons show the two rabbits' life on the run from law enforcement. Every episode is 5 minutes long. So far, 6 seasons and 78 episodes have been released.

== Setting ==
The episodes are quite musical. Almost every action has a sound associated with it and most episodes in the first season begin with a quiet jazzy beat accompanied by the rhythmic squeaking noises of Putin dancing Kozachok on his bed. Each season has at least one entire episode which consists of a sort of song, created by the sounds of characters and the environmental setting. Each episode usually ends with the punchline accompanied by the chorale Jesus bleibet meine Freude from J.S. Bach's cantata Herz und Mund und Tat und Leben, BWV 147. The animation style is a clean, rather sparse, linear style with broad swatches of color. There is, generally speaking, some incomprehensible whispering but usually no intelligible speech. Speech is heard in the second season, when some Russian phrases can be heard quite clearly, although they are few and far between. Everything is communicated through either incidental sound or by a character expressing emotions.

== Characters ==
=== Main characters ===
Kirenenko (キレネンコ)
Kirenenko wears a prison uniform with red stripes, number 04. He has a safety pin stuck through his left ear. Originally a mafia boss, he was sentenced to death. He does not talk much, but is very dangerous when he becomes angry and goes berserk. When pushed far enough, he enters into a demonic rage form, which is clearly displayed by his face. He likes order and does not forgive anyone who crosses his path or otherwise "meddles" in his life. He collects sneakers and is generally oblivious to, or apathetic about, the world around him while he reads his magazine advertising sneakers; he cares for nothing but his sneakers. He is also practically invincible as normal weapons such as bullets and clubs do not harm him. Poisons don't work on him either. When he dies, he is easily revived if pieced back together. In season six/zero, it is revealed that he and Putin did not begin as cell mates, and he was heavily bandaged up when he got incarcerated. This made moving around difficult, but he was still able to hit hard if he got the chance to. He and Putin are the main protagonists of the series.

Putin (プーチン, Pūchin)
Putin wears a prison uniform with green stripes, number 541. He has his ears tied together and is good-natured. He likes to dance kozachok on his bed (episode 12 shows him dancing kozachok in his sleep). He likes fun but often gets into trouble. He was an honest laborer who once missed a day of work due to a hangover and was sentenced to 3 years in jail as a capitalist agent. However, he enjoys life in prison with its free food and is a master of cooking. He was only one day from being released when he followed Kirenenko out of the cell. He panics very easily, enough so that his face will turn blue (fear or anxiety or general discomfort), red, and/or deathly pale white (near death or when scared beyond measure) when he is nervous depending on the situation. He also has a very low tolerance of alcohol; a single cup of wine will make him extremely drunk. He is, however, an extremely capable mechanic, able to build robots, assemble cars and disassemble guns, each within a split second. In season six/zero, it was revealed that Putin was still quite drunk when he got incarcerated. Upon becoming fully sober, he was rather confused and scared by his new surroundings.

Leningrad (レニングラード, Reningurādo)
Leningrad is an Argentine horned frog found living in the toilet in Putin and Kirenenko's cell. He does little more than croak, eat Komanetsyn, and defecate the chick out again. He plays an important role in the musical episodes, adding to the rhythm and making Putin gasp, which also happens rhythmically. His mother, Sharapova and her large husband Mikhail live in a far forest. Season six/zero reveals he hatched and matured to a fully adult frog in the prison's plumbing system.

Komanetsyn (コマネチ, Komanechi)
Komanetsyn is a transvestite chick found by Putin while sorting chicks by gender in Episode 2. Unlike the other chicks in that episode, he has lips and stubble on his belly instead of a beak; this also applies to every chicken that appears in the rest of the show. His mother visited during episode 6 and was eaten by Kirenenko. He is repeatedly killed throughout the series, but comes back to life on a regular basis. In season 4, Komanetsyn instantaneously becomes an adult (as a result of being caught in radiation emitted by Mechanenko in order to bolster plant growth) and gives birth to Komanetsyn Jr. However, in episode 56 the original Komanetsyn and Komanetsyn Jr. both die and "merge" into a new chick. Additionally in his chick form he always gets aroused in front of every adult he comes across.

Mechanenko (メカネンコ, Mekanenko)
Mechanenko is a robot built by Putin in episode 35 to scare away snipers sent by Zrzolov, due to Kirenenko being dead at the time. It follows the cast thereafter. His design is based on Kirenenko; consequently, he is just as indestructible and powerful, only being overmatched by Kirenenko himself. While not appearing in season six/zero, it is revealed that Putin did have ideas of a robotic rabbit in mind and a prototype was created, though did not go pass beyond a (failed) experiment of Putin.

=== Additional characters ===
Prison workers

Several guards and other prison workers visit Putin and Kirenenko in their cell. They are never fully visible, and the character on the other side of the door is indicated by one of several door designs that slide into place. Episode 3 briefly reveals that they too are rabbits. In season six/zero, it is revealed they used to not wear the doors all the time. They are the main antagonists of season 1 and six/zero.

- Kanschkov (カンシュコフ, Kanshukofu) – various guards (from 看守 kanshu, Japanese for prison guard)
- Roudov (ロウドフ, Rōdofu) – work boss (from 労働 rodou, labor)
- Zenirov (ゼニロフ, Zenirofu) – paymaster (from '銭 zeni, cash)
- Shocasky (ショケイスキー, Shokeisukī) – executioner (from 処刑 shokei, execution)

Komanetsyn mother (father) (コマネチ母(父), Komanechi haha (chichi))
The mother of Komanetsyn, and also technically a father.

Sharapova (シャラポワ, Sharapowa)
The mother of Leningrad. She lives with her husband in the forest, and appears in the first season to meet her son in the jail.
Boris (ボリス, Borisu) and Kopchev (コプチェフ, Kopuchefu)
Boris and Kopchev are militsiya, civilian police officers, who chase Kirenenko. Kopchev is the driver while Boris the rifleman. They are the main antagonists in season 2, in which they attempt, and fail, to arrest Kirenenko. They are still in charge of arresting him in subsequent episodes.

Zrzolov (ズルゾロフ, Zuruzorofu)
Zrzolov is the owner of the tower venue of season 3, in which he is the main antagonist. He is usually seen with his two mistresses. He is rich, greedy, narcissistic, and an exhibitionist. Throughout the season he tries to kill Kirenenko and take his money. Zrzolov is wanted with a reward of 1,000,000 Rubles. During the last episode, he was portrayed to be the one who had killed both Kirenenko and Kirunenko by entrapping them in a warhead with a bait of sneakers, and blasting them off sky high where the warhead explodes, although Kirenenko does not seem to remember this.

Zoya (ゾーヤ, Zōya) and Ziriya (ジリヤ, Jiriya)
Beautiful twin sisters who serve Zrzolov as mistresses.

Zuruzorobo (ズルゾロボ, Zuruzorobo)
A giant robot with a design based on the face of Zrzolov.

Kirunenko (キルネンコ)
Kirenenko's twin brother, who was also the mafia leader. Owing to the twins being killed in a blast by Zrzolov and their organs being separated, they are "rigged up" after surgery, resulting in dual personalities. In the official document, he is still the present mafia leader, and in season 4 Kirenenko gets in touch with him via video call. He makes his first actual (though brief) appearance in season 5. Like his twin brother, Kirunenko has an obsession with sneakers and as it is shown in Usavich Zero ep 7 "The beginning of the door" he randomly swapped his left sneaker to his twin brother.

Kedamsky (ケダムスキー, Kedamusukī)
A big rabbit who lives in the forest of season 5, in which he is the main antagonist. He repeatedly tries to steal Kirenenko's luggage and eat the carrots in it but fails. In the season finale Kedamsky finally eats the "dash mushroom" to successfully steal the luggage, but it also causes him leave the forest with the protagonists.

Mikhail (ミハイル, Mihairu)
The father of Leningrad. He is much bigger than his wife and son, and is able to eat anything as big as him.

=== Vehicles ===
Season 2 features some Soviet cars and military vehicles. Moskvitch 402 is the car Kirenenko and Putin use for their escape, civilians drive Lada VAZ-2101, and the militsiya-use Lada VAZ-2105 police cars, BA-20 armored car and even a KV-2 heavy tank. The aircraft brought down by Kirenenko is also a MiG-21 Fishbed fighter jet. During the story, Putin put many parts from the other vehicles together to maintain their original car, and after season 4 he combined it with Mechanenko to escape.

== Episodes ==
For every fifth episode of each season save for Season 6/0, there is an impromptu percussive performance in the show, often involving Leningrad's ribbits, Putin's gasps, and Kirenenko's punches. In Season 6/0, such performance plays in "The Beginning of Dancing", the eighth episode of the season.

Season 1

- Episode 1 "Time for Food"
- Episode 2 "Time for Work"
- Episode 2.5 "Time for Work (Another Point of View)"
- Episode 3 "Time for a Shower"
- Episode 4 "Time for Games"
- Episode 5 "Time for Dancing"
- Episode 6 "Time for Visitors"
- Episode 7 "Time for Exercise"
- Episode 8 "Time for Cards"
- Episode 9 "Time for a Snack"
- Episode 10 "Time for Toilet"
- Episode 11 "Time for Execution"
- Episode 12 "Time for Torture"
- Episode 13 "Time for an Exit"
- Episode 13.5 "Time for Departure"

Season 2

- Episode 14 "Beware of Road Rage!"
- Episode 15 "Beware of Distractions!"
- Episode 16 "Beware of Cliffs!"
- Episode 17 "Beware of Snipers!"
- Episode 18 "Beware of Dancing!"
- Episode 19 "Beware of Missiles!"
- Episode 20 "Beware of a Flat Tire!"
- Episode 21 "Beware of Speeding!"
- Episode 22 "Beware of Tanks!"
- Episode 23 "Beware of Repairs!"
- Episode 24 "Beware of Fakes!"
- Episode 25 "Beware of Checkpoints!"
- Episode 26 "Beware of Assaults!"
- Episode 26.5 "Beware of Extreme Masochist!"

Season 3

- Episode 27 "The 1st Floor"
- Episode 28 "The 2nd Floor"
- Episode 29 "The 3rd Floor"
- Episode 30 "The 4th Floor"
- Episode 31 "The 5th Floor"
- Episode 32 "The 6th Floor"
- Episode 33 "The 7th Floor"
- Episode 34 "The 8th Floor"
- Episode 35 "The 9th Floor"
- Episode 36 "The 10th Floor"
- Episode 37 "The 11th Floor"
- Episode 38 "The 12th Floor"
- Episode 39 "The 13th Floor"
- Episode 39.5 "The Sound Floor"

Season 4

- Episode 40 "Cooking Machine"
- Episode 41 "Cleaning Machine"
- Episode 42 "Merge Machine"
- Episode 43 "Washing Machine"
- Episode 44 "Dance Machine"
- Episode 45 "Refrigerator Machine"
- Episode 46 "Washroom Machine"
- Episode 47 "Game Machine"
- Episode 48 "TV Phone Machine"
- Episode 49 "Magic Machine"
- Episode 50 "Broken Machine"
- Episode 51 "Window Wipe Machine"
- Episode 52 "Car Machine"

Season 5

- Episode 53 "Forest of Fur"
- Episode 54 "Forest of Hide-and-seek"
- Episode 55 "Forest of Mushroom"
- Episode 56 "Forest of Komanetsyn"
- Episode 57 "Forest of Dance"
- Episode 58 "Forest of Frog"
- Episode 59 "Forest of Brother"
- Episode 60 "Forest of Hole"
- Episode 61 "Forest of Sleep"
- Episode 62 "Forest of Trap"
- Episode 63 "Forest of Fishing"
- Episode 64 "Forest of Horror"
- Episode 65 "Forest of Dash"

Season 6 – Usavich Zero (prequel)

- Episode 66 "The Beginning of Revival"
- Episode 67 "The Beginning of Food"
- Episode 68 "The Beginning of Nap"
- Episode 69 "The Beginning of Toilet"
- Episode 70 "The Beginning of Shoes"
- Episode 71 "The Beginning of Doors"
- Episode 72 "The Beginning of Jail"
- Episode 73 "The Beginning of Dancing"
- Episode 74 "The Beginning of Work"
- Episode 75 "The Beginning of Frog"
- Episode 76 "The Beginning of Invention"
- Episode 77 "The Beginning of Neighbor"
- Episode 78 "The Beginning of Freedom"
