= Bale Telipaale =

Indian Tulu language comedy competition show

Bale Telipaale is an Indian Tulu language comedy competition show that premiered on Namma TV in December, 2014. It become one of Tulu Nadu's most watched shows.
