= Chopped 420 =

American television series

- Presented by: Ron Funches

Original release
- Network: Food Network
- Release: April 20, 2021

Chopped 420 is a 2021 television series produced by Food Network, concerning competitive cooking with cannabis. It made its debut on the discovery+ streaming service with five episodes on April 20, 2021. Esther Choi, Luke Reyes, Sam Talbot, Tacarra Williams, and Laganja Estranja served as judges. Chopped 420 is no longer available on Discovery+.

The series follows other networks' cannabis cooking shows, such as Cooked with Cannabis, Bong Appétit from Vice and Cooking on High from Netflix.

== Episodes ==
| No. overall | No. in season | Title | Judges | Original release date |
|---|---|---|---|---|
| 1 | 1 | "High Expectations" | Sam Talbot, Esther Choi, and Laganja Estranja | April 20, 2021 |
Ingredients: Appetizer: spot prawns, loaded baked potato quesadillas, herb bouquet, Borscht; Entrée: Garbage Plate, Nopal, Pork chops, chocolate dentures; Dessert: Sundae, Pineberry, Lemon verbena, Ketchup; Contestants: Hemant Kishore (eliminated after the appetizer); Lindsay Penland (eliminated after the entrée); Chris Binotto (eliminated after the dessert); Wendy Zeng (winner)
| 2 | 2 | "Puff, Puff, Run" | Sam Talbot, Esther Choi, and Laganja Estranja | April 20, 2021 |
Ingredients: Appetizer: dandelion greens, sour meat stew, spray cheese, pretzel toaster pastries; Entrée: sake popsicles, chicken boba waffles, castelvetrano olives, barracuda filet; Dessert: chocolate milk, grape popping candy, dates, pizza French toast; Contestants: Brandin Lashea (eliminated after the appetizer); Mychal Pride (eliminated after the entrée); Jarod Farina (eliminated after the dessert); Emily Oyer (winner)
| 3 | 3 | "Get Baked or Get Chopped" | Luke Reyes, Esther Choi, and Sam Talbot | April 20, 2021 |
Ingredients: Appetizer: ruby red grapefruit, kielbasa, curry leaves, pickle pie; Entrée: reindeer jerky, croquembouche, cornish hens, turnips; Dessert: a round of gelatin beers, sour belts, passion fruit, spotted dick; Contestants: Masha Tikin (eliminated after the appetizer); Jeff Danzer (eliminated after the entrée); Josh Gil (eliminated after the dessert); Victor Aguilera (winner)
| 4 | 4 | "THC You on the Chopping Block" | Tacarra Williams, Esther Choi, and Luke Reyes | April 20, 2021 |
Ingredients: Appetizer: tea-smoked duck, corn on the cob, lavender, garlic ice cream; Entrée: eel, candy cane beets, giant marshmallows, armadillo eggs; Dessert: clementines, cottage cheese, white chocolate cookie bark, grass jelly; Contestants: Jennifer Felmley (eliminated after the appetizer); Derek Upton (eliminated after the entrée); Gabe Kennedy (eliminated after the dessert); Solomon Johnson (winner)
| 5 | 5 | "Go Green or Go Home" | Tacarra Williams, Esther Choi, and Luke Reyes | April 20, 2021 |
Ingredients: Appetizer: mussels, shiso leaves, stoner goblet, cheese balls; Entrée: french sorrel, smoked rice, canned spiced ham, chicken black truffle pot pie; Dessert: candied crabs, maraschino cherries, pour over coffee, joint cake; Contestants: Daniel Stramm (eliminated after the appetizer); Tiana Ramos (eliminated after the entrée); Maverick Kelly (eliminated after the dessert); Derek Simcik (winner)

== Reception ==
Joel Keller writing for Decider said the series was "more serious than we expected."

Megan Reynolds at Jezebel said that "the weed connection is just a gimmick, and the contestants are still racing against the clock to complete a dish" as with the original Chopped.

Common Sense Media said "The contestants are very skilled and accomplished chefs, and they find creative ways to use strange ingredients, but these tend to be overshadowed by the series' narrow focus on cannabis."
