= Totally Funny Kids =

American reality television series

- Genre: Comedy clip show
- Presented by: Tacarra Williams
- Country of origin: United States
- Original language: English
- No. of seasons: 1
- No. of episodes: 30

Production
- Executive producers: Vin Di Bona; John Stevens; Hans Schiff; Rick De Oliveira
- Running time: 22 minutes
- Production companies: FishBowl Worldwide Media; V10 Entertainment

Original release
- Network: The CW
- Release: February 16, 2024 – August 8, 2025

Related
- Totally Funny Animals

Totally Funny Kids is an American clip show television series hosted by actress and comedian Tacarra Williams. It premiered on February 16, 2024 on The CW, alongside Totally Funny Animals; both are productions of FishBowl Worldwide Media and executive produced by Vin Di Bona (America's Funniest Home Videos) among others.

== Format ==
Host Williams narrates humorous video clips of kids and the ensuing reactions from their parents; during each episode, the top three viral video moments of the week are featured, with the winner announced at the end of the show.

== Production ==
According to Williams, the series's first season was recorded over six days, with five episodes per day for a total of 30 episodes.

== Episodes ==
No.	Title	Original release date	Prod. code	U.S. viewers (millions)	Rating (18–49)
1	"I Scream, You Scream, Enough with the Screaming Already"	February 16, 2024	101	0.33	0.1
2	"Unaccompanied Minors"	February 23, 2024	102	0.36	0.1
3	"Play By Play By Playground"	March 1, 2024	103	0.36	0.1
4	"A Day in the Theme Park"	March 8, 2024	104	0.42	0.1
5	"The Sisterhood (and Brotherhood) of the Babbling Rants!"	March 15, 2024	105	0.29	0.0
6	"Ordering Off The Kids' Menu"	March 22, 2024	106	0.35	0.0
7	"Dressed to Spill"	March 29, 2024	107	0.46	0.0
8	"Living In a Youngster's Paradise"	June 14, 2024	108	0.36	0.0
9	"The Tots Came Tumbling Down"	June 21, 2024	109	0.49	0.0
10	"The Good, the Dad, and the Snuggly"	June 28, 2024	110	0.31	0.1
11	"Tots, Teens, and Telephones"	July 5, 2024	111	0.35	0.0
12	"Free Range, Feral, and Fun"	July 12, 2024	112	0.36	0.1
13	"Make-up, Manners, and Mishaps"	July 19, 2024	113	0.41	0.0
14	"Aches, Snakes, and Patty Cakes"	July 26, 2024	114	0.31	0.0
15	"Monsters, Messes, and Moms"	August 2, 2024	115	0.29	0.0
16	"Life Lessons and Little Helper"	August 9, 2024	116	0.29	0.0
17	"Cutie Pies and Alibis"	August 16, 2024	117	0.44	0.0
18	"Retorts, Sports, and Dad Shorts"	August 23, 2024	118	0.32	0.0
19	"Parents, Pranks, and Pratfalls"	September 1, 2024	119	0.30	0.1
20	"Pains, Stains, and Automobiles"	September 5, 2024	120	0.30	0.0
21	"Thunder, Wonder, and Blunder"	September 6, 2024	121	0.40	0.0
22	"Candid Kids, Fail Vids, and Heck's Kitchen"	September 12, 2024	122	0.41	0.1
23	"There's No Crying in Whiffle Ball"	September 19, 2024	123	0.31	0.0
24	"Little Singers, Club Swingers and Verbal Stingers"	September 26, 2024	124	0.32	0.0
25	"Double Double, Trip, and Stumble"	November 18, 2024	125	0.26	0.0
26	"Schools, Tools, and Robot Rules"	November 25, 2024	126	0.26	0.0
27	"Bakers, Fakers, and Tiny Filmmakers"	July 18, 2025	127	0.32	0.0
28	"Twins, Wins, and Battered Up Shins"	July 25, 2025	128	0.30	0.0
29	"Dance, Rants, and a Kick in the Pants"	August 1, 2025	129	0.32	0.0
30	"Bibs, Cribs, and Annoying Sibs"	August 8, 2025	130	0.33	0.0

== Reception ==
=== Critical response ===
Melissa Camacho of Common Sense Media gave the show 3 out of 5 stars.
