= Totally Funny Animals =

American reality television series

- Genre: Comedy clip show
- Presented by: Andy Woodhull
- Country of origin: United States
- Original language: English
- No. of seasons: 2
- No. of episodes: 56 (and 2 specials)

Production
- Executive producers: Vin Di Bona; John Stevens; Hans Schiff; Rick De Oliveira
- Running time: 22 minutes
- Production companies: FishBowl Worldwide Media; V10 Entertainment

Original release
- Network: The CW
- Release: February 16, 2024 – present

Related
- Totally Funny Kids

Totally Funny Animals is an American clip show television series, hosted by comedian Andy Woodhull. It premiered on February 16, 2024, on The CW, alongside Totally Funny Kids; both series are executive produced by Vin Di Bona (best known as the producer of America's Funniest Home Videos), among others.

Totally Funny Animals is similar in title and format to another CW series, World's Funniest Animals (2020–2024), albeit they are produced by different studios.

On April 22, 2025, the series was renewed for a 100-episode second season, which premiered on June 5, 2026.

== Format ==
Host Woodhull presents and narrates comedic, caught-on-camera videos of animals (similar to America's Funniest Home Videos and its Animal Edition spinoff). In season 1, each episode featured a top 10 countdown of animal clips focused on a particular theme (reflected in the episode's title); beginning with season 2, select clips in each episode are chosen as nominees for the night's "Golden Paw Award", the winner of which is revealed at the end of the show.

== Episodes ==
=== Series overview ===
Season	Episodes	Originally released	
Season	Episodes	First released	Last released
1	30	February 16, 2024	August 8, 2025
2	100	June 5, 2026	TBA
Specials	2	October 31, 2025	November 28, 2025

=== Season 1 (2024–25) ===
No. overall	No. in season	Title	Original release date	Prod. code	U.S. viewers (millions)	Rating (18–49)
1	1	"Top 10 Times the Dog Was 'Fraidy Cat"	February 16, 2024	101	0.38	0.1
2	2	"Top 10 Little Creatures"	February 23, 2024	102	0.39	0.1
3	3	"Top 10 Reasons Dogs Shouldn't Be Babysitters"	March 1, 2024	103	0.43	0.1
4	4	"Top 10 Times You Wondered Why the Pet Got So Expensive"	March 8, 2024	104	0.40	0.1
5	5	"Top 10 Times You Wondered How They Got Their Head Stuck in There"	March 15, 2024	105	0.32	0.0
6	6	"Top 10 Animal Arguments"	March 22, 2024	106	0.37	0.0
7	7	"Top 10 Signs Your Parents Like the Dog More Than You"	March 29, 2024	107	0.49	0.1
8	8	"Top 10 Times the Security Footage Was Better Than TV"	June 14, 2024	108	0.34	0.0
9	9	"Top 10 Times the Tail Just Got in the Way"	June 21, 2024	109	0.50	0.1
10	10	"Top 10 Scarediest Fraidy Cats"	June 28, 2024	110	0.31	0.1
11	11	"Top 10 Times an Animal Made the Perfect Dance Partner"	July 5, 2024	111	0.39	0.0
12	12	"Top 10 Times Your Pet Was Having a Worse Day Than You"	July 12, 2024	112	0.38	0.1
13	13	"Top 10 Times You Wish You Hadn't Been Behind the Camera"	July 19, 2024	113	0.40	0.0
14	14	"Top 10 Animal Encounters"	July 26, 2024	114	0.30	0.0
15	15	"Top 10 Pelican Encounters"	August 2, 2024	115	0.27	0.0
16	16	"Top 10 Times You Were Glad That Glass Was There"	August 9, 2024	116	0.34	0.0
17	17	"Traumatic Petting Zoo Experiences"	August 16, 2024	117	0.39	0.1
18	18	"Top 10 Times You Were More Afraid of It Than It Was of You"	August 23, 2024	118	0.33	0.0
19	19	"Top 10 Times Your Dog Could Not Resist the Toilet Paper"	September 1, 2024	119	0.42	0.0
20	20	"Top 10 Characters Cut from Andrew Lloyd Webber's Cats"	September 5, 2024	120	0.32	0.0
21	21	"Top 10 Less Than Cool Cats"	September 6, 2024	121	0.42	0.1
22	22	"Top 10 Turkeys Who Won't Get a Presidential Pardon This Thanksgiving"	September 12, 2024	122	0.39	0.0
23	23	"Top 10 Skills Your Dog Probably Won't Learn at Obedience School!"	September 19, 2024	123	0.30	0.0
24	24	"Top 10 Cat Attacks"	September 26, 2024	124	0.32	0.1
25	25	"Top 10 Times That Bear Got a Little Too Close"	November 18, 2024	125	0.25	0.0
26	26	"Top 10 Times Your Dog Forgot He Was a Dog"	November 25, 2024	126	0.28	0.0
27	27	"Top 10 Times Animals Proved They Are Smarter Than You Think"	July 18, 2025	127	0.39	0.0
28	28	"Top 10 Aerial Attacks"	July 25, 2025	128	0.31	0.0
29	29	"Top 10 Times It Was Good Cats Have Nine Lives"	August 1, 2025	129	0.35	0.0
30	30	"Top 10 Animal Dining Experiences"	August 8, 2025	130	0.33	0.0

=== Season 2 (2026) ===
No. overall	No. in season	Title	Original release date	Prod. code	U.S. viewers (millions)	Rating (18–49)
31	1	"Nutty Buddies"	June 5, 2026	201	N/A	TBA
32	2	"Safety Seal"	June 5, 2026	202	N/A	TBA
33	3	"Just Bear-ly"	June 12, 2026	203	N/A	TBA
34	4	"Party Tricks"	June 12, 2026	204	N/A	TBA
35	5	"Spidey Sense"	July 3, 2026	205	N/A	TBA
36	6	"Take a Hike!"	July 3, 2026	206	N/A	TBA
37	7	"Batter Up!"	July 10, 2026	207	N/A	TBA
38	8	"Monkey Sea, Monkey Do"	July 10, 2026	208	N/A	TBA
39	9	"Hare Raiser"	July 24, 2026	209	N/A	TBA
40	10	"Whale Hello There"	July 24, 2026	210	N/A	TBA
41	11	"You Snooze You Lose"	July 31, 2026	211	N/A	TBA
42	12	"Whale of a Tale"	July 31, 2026	212	N/A	TBA
43	13	"She's Crafty"	August 7, 2026	213	N/A	TBA
44	14	"Tricks for Treats"	August 7, 2026	214	N/A	TBA
45	15	"In Dad We Trust"	August 14, 2026	215	N/A	TBA
46	16	"Speed Bump"	August 14, 2026	216	N/A	TBA
47	17	"I Scream You Scream"	August 21, 2026	217	N/A	TBA
48	18	"Swing and a Miss"	August 21, 2026	218	N/A	TBA
49	19	"Monkey Business"	September 4, 2026	219	N/A	TBA
50	20	"Pampered Pets"	September 4, 2026	220	N/A	TBA
51	21	"Sitting Pretty"	September 11, 2026	221	N/A	TBA
52	22	"Rolling on the River"	September 11, 2026	222	N/A	TBA
53	23	"WILD Animals"	September 25, 2026	223	N/A	TBA
54	24	"Hip Hop Hooray"	September 25, 2026	224	N/A	TBA
55	25	"Jump For Joy"	October 16, 2026	225	TBD	TBA
56	26	"Road Rage"	October 16, 2026	226	TBD	TBA

=== Specials (2025) ===
No.	Title	Original release date	Prod. code	U.S. viewers (millions)	Rating (18–49)
1	"Howl-o-Ween Hijinks" "A Totally Funny Animals Halloween"	October 31, 2025	227	0.37	0.0
2	"A Totally Funny Animals Holiday"	November 28, 2025	TBA	N/A	TBA
