= List of science communicators =

This is a list of notable science communicators or popularizers of science, in alphabetical order by last name.

== A ==
- John Acorn, naturalist and broadcaster known as the "Nature Nut"
- Amir Aczel, Jewish author and mathematician
- Maggie Aderin-Pocock, space scientist and broadcaster
- Hashem Al-Ghaili, molecular biotechnologist and video producer
- Jim Al-Khalili, theoretical physicist, author, and science communicator
- Alan Alda, actor; inspired the Alan Alda Center for Communicating Science
- Michael Allaby, writes on science, ecology, and weather
- Alberto Angela (born 1962), television presenter, paleontologist, writer, popularizer of science and history
- Piero Angela (1928–2022), journalist, television presenter, writer, popularizer of science, founder of CICAP (Italian Committee for the Investigation of Claims on Pseudosciences)
- Natalie Angier, science journalist and writer
- Isaac Asimov, biochemist, science-fiction writer, and author
- Peter Atkins, physical chemist and author
- Sir David Attenborough, naturalist and broadcaster
- Amy Atwater, paleontologist, podcaster and author

== B ==
- J. Michael Bailey, psychologist; known for his research on the etiology of sexual orientation
- Johnny Ball, broadcaster and math popularizer
- Kirsten Banks, Australian astrophysicist and science communicator of the Wiradjuri people
- John D. Barrow, mathematician, theoretical physicist, and cosmologist; author of numerous journal articles, and books for general readers
- Marcia Bartusiak, science journalist and author
- David Bellamy, broadcaster, author, and botanist
- Bob Berman, astronomer
- Adrian Berry, science author and columnist
- Kate Biberdorf, chemist
- Tim Blais, physicist and YouTuber
- Howard Bloom, author
- David Bodanis, author
- Liz Bonnin, biochemist and television presenter
- Daniel J. Boorstin, author and Librarian of Congress
- Sir David Brewster, Scottish scientist
- John Brockman, specializing authorship in the scientific literature
- Jacob Bronowski, mathematician, biologist, historian of science, author, and pioneering science broadcaster
- Michael Brooks, science writer
- Bill Bryson, author
- Rob Buckman, doctor of medicine, broadcaster, columnist, author
- James Burke, broadcaster, television producer, and author; known for the science historian BBC television series Connections
- Cristy Burne, children's science writer

== C ==
- Nigel Calder, broadcaster and journalist
- Dallas Campbell, presented the science television series Bang Goes the Theory
- Fritjof Capra, physicist and author
- Sean M. Carroll, cosmologist, blogger, and author
- Rachel Carson, marine biologist, conservationist, author
- Ralph Caspers, German television presenter, screenwriter, and author
- Manuel Castells, sociologist and writer
- Heather Catchpole, journalist and science communicator
- Juliana Chan, Singaporean biologist and science communicator
- Marcus Chown, author and science journalist
- Brian Clegg, author
- Jack Cohen, reproductive biologist
- Lee Constable, television presenter, author, and biologist
- Heather Couper, astronomer, broadcaster, and author
- Jacques-Yves Cousteau, oceanographer, underwater explorer, conservationist, filmmaker, and broadcaster
- Brian Cox, broadcaster, musician, and physicist
- Michael Crichton, medical doctor, author, filmmaker
- Francis Crick, molecular biologist, biophysicist, and neuroscientist; joint discoverer of the structure of the DNA molecule
- Jon Culshaw, impressionist, also occasionally appears as a presenter on The Sky at Night

== D ==
- Antonio Damasio, neuroscientist and writer
- Tobias Dantzig, mathematician and author
- Paul Davies, physicist, author, and broadcaster
- Richard Dawkins, evolutionary biologist and author
- Michael DeBakey, cardiac surgeon, innovator, and author
- Daniel Dennett, philosopher, cognitive scientist and author
- Keith Devlin, mathematician and author
- Alexander Dewdney, mathematician, computer scientist, and philosopher
- Jared Diamond, evolutionary biologist, physiologist and geographer
- Anne-Sophie Dielen, researcher, scientist communicator and policy maker
- Ann Druyan, science writer, co-author with (and widow of) Carl Sagan
- Robin Dunbar, anthropology; evolutionary psychology, culture and language; and specialist in primate behavior
- Marcus Du Sautoy, author, broadcaster, professor of mathematics

== E ==
- David Eagleman, neuroscientist and author
- Sir Arthur Eddington, astrophysicist
- Loren Eiseley, professor of anthropology and history of science
- Jordan Ellenberg, mathematician and author

== F ==
- Peter Fairley, journalist and broadcaster
- Michael Faraday, scientist and public lecturer
- Kenneth Feder, archaeologist, pseudoscience debunker, lecturer, and author
- Timothy Ferris, science writer and best-selling author of twelve books
- Brian J. Ford, biologist, lecturer, and author
- Anna Frebel, astrophysicist and author
- Hannah Fry, mathematician and broadcaster

== G ==
- George Gamow, physicist, cosmologist, and author
- Martin Gardner, mathematician, author, skeptic and polymath
- Atul Gawande, surgeon and author
- James Gleick, author, including journalist
- Marcelo Gleiser, physicist and astronomer
- Ben Goldacre, medical doctor, psychiatrist, and author
- Jane Goodall, English primatologist and anthropologist
- Hank Green, entrepreneur, musician, and vlogger
- Brian Greene, physicist
- Susan Greenfield, brain physiologist, writer and broadcaster
- Richard Gregory, neuropsychologist, author and editor of several books
- John Gribbin, astronomer and author

== H ==
- Heinz Haber, physicist and author
- Margherita Hack, astrophysicist, writer and activist
- Gunther von Hagens, German anatomist and pathologist, inventor of plastination and creator of Body Worlds (traveling exposition)
- Thomas Hager, author and science journalist
- J. B. S. Haldane, biologist and author
- Erika Hamden, American astrophysicist
- Jack Hanna, zoologist, broadcaster, author
- Brady Haran, science YouTube video creator
- Bas Haring, philosopher and chair for Public understanding of science at Leiden University.
- Lucy Hawking, journalist and daughter of Stephen Hawking
- Stephen Hawking, theoretical physicist and author
- Ed Hawkins, British climatologist who developed warming stripes and other graphics
- Katharine Hayhoe, Canadian climate scientist and author
- Hetty Helsmoortel, Belgian scientist, author, founder of the Nerdland Festival
- Toby Hendy, science YouTube video creator and author
- Andrew Mark Henry, scholar of religious studies and YouTuber
- Don Herbert (also known as Mr. Wizard), broadcaster
- Maya Higa, conservationist, streamer and content creator, founder of the Alveus Sanctuary
- Eckart von Hirschhausen, German physician, comedian, author, and talkshow host
- Roald Hoffmann, author of popular science books, science poetry, and plays about science history
- Douglas Hofstadter, computer scientist, cognitive scientist, and author
- Lancelot Hogben, experimental zoologist and medical statistician, with many popularising books on science, mathematics, and language
- Sabine Hossenfelder, theoretical physicist and physics focused YouTube video creator
- Julian Huxley, scientist, author, and first director of UNESCO (the United Nations Educational, Scientific and Cultural Organization)
- Jamie Hyneman, special-effects artist and television personality (MythBusters)

== I ==
- Jay Ingram, broadcaster and author (Daily Planet television series)
- Steve Irwin, wildlife entertainer and conservationist

== J ==
- Hope Jahren, geochemist and author
- Ray Jayawardhana, astrophysicist and author
- Donald Carl Johanson, paleoanthropologist and author
- Steven Johnson, author
- Steve Jones, evolutionary biologist and author
- Horace Freeland Judson, historian of molecular biology and author
- Olivia Judson, evolutionary biologist, broadcaster and author

== K ==
- Michio Kaku, theoretical physicist and author
- Sam Kean, author
- David Kipping, associate professor, astronomer and YouTuber
- Marek Kukula, public astronomer at the Royal Observatory, Greenwich
- Lawrence Krauss, physicist and author
- Robert Krulwich, broadcaster
- Karl Kruszelnicki (also known as Dr Karl), science broadcaster for ABC News (Australia)

== L ==
- Lynne Lamberg, American freelance science journalist
- Richard Leakey, Kenyan paleoanthropologist and conservationist
- John Lennox, mathematician and author
- Edward M. Lerner, computer engineer and popular science author
- Harald Lesch, German astronomer, television presenter, professor, and author
- Daniel Levitin, cognitive neuroscientist and author
- Roger Lewin, British anthropologist
- Richard Lewontin, evolutionary biologist, geneticist, and author
- Willy Ley, space-travel enthusiast and science writer
- Don Lincoln, particle physicist and author
- Chris Lintott, astrophysicist and science broadcaster
- Avi Loeb, astronomer and author
- Professor Lyrical, rapper, associate professor of mathematics

== M ==
- Katie Mack, astrophysics professor and social media science creator
- Lynn Margulis, evolutionary biologist and author
- Robert Matthews, physicist, mathematician, computer scientist, and science journalist
- Bob McDonald, CBC science journalist and host of Quirks and Quarks
- Alister McGrath, molecular biologist and author
- Danica McKellar, actress, author, mathematician
- Fulvio Melia, physicist, astrophysicist, and author
- Ben Miller, English comedian and television show host, including It's Not Rocket Science
- Julius Sumner Miller, physicist and broadcaster
- Mark Miodownik, materials scientist, engineer, broadcaster, and writer
- Ashley Montagu, anthropologist and humanist; written over sixty books
- Sir Patrick Moore, amateur astronomer and broadcaster
- Desmond Morris, zoologist, ethologist and author
- Hamilton Morris, pharmacologist, broadcaster, and author
- Philip Morrison, physicist; known for his numerous books and television programs
- Siddhartha Mukherjee, oncologist, biologist, author
- Derek Muller, science YouTube content creator
- Randall Munroe, writer of What If blog and creator of the xkcd webcomic
- PZ Myers, professor and author of the science blog Pharyngula

== N ==
- Yoshiro Nakamatsu, Japanese inventor and frequent broadcast communicator
- Jayant Narlikar, cosmologist and author
- Mai Thi Nguyen-Kim, German chemist, television presenter, youtuber, and author
- Lindsay Nikole, zoologist, Youtuber, and content creator
- Steven Novella, science podcaster
- Eugene P. Northrop, research mathematician and math popularizer
- Bill Nye, actor and host of Bill Nye the Science Guy
- Tor Nørretranders, author

== O ==
- Sten Odenwald, astronomer, author, lecturer
- Robert Olby, author and historian of science
- Chad Orzel, physicist and author

== P ==
- Kasha Patel, comedian and science writer
- Linus Pauling, biochemist, author, and educator
- John Allen Paulos, mathematician and author
- Fred Pearce, journalist at New Scientist magazine
- Yakov I. Perelman, author of popular science books
- Phil Plait, astronomer and skeptic who runs the Bad Astronomy website
- Martyn Poliakoff, British chemist, featured in the YouTube The Periodic Table of Videos series
- John Polkinghorne, physicist and author
- Robert Pollack, biologist and author
- Michael Pollan, journalist and author, professor
- Carolyn Porco, leader of Cassini Imaging Team
- Roy Porter, prolific work on the history of medicine
- Christopher Potter, publisher, philosopher and author
- Eduard Punset, politician, lawyer, economist, and science popularizer
- Magnus Pyke, food scientist, broadcaster, and author

== R ==
- V. S. Ramachandran, neuroscientist, cognitive scientist, and author
- Lisa Randall, theoretical physicist and author
- Mark Ridley, zoologist, evolutionary scientist and author
- Matt Ridley, zoologist, journalist and author
- Alice Roberts, anatomist, anthropologist, television presenter, and author
- Steven Rose, biologist, neurobiologist, broadcaster and author
- Carlo Rovelli, theoretical physicist and author

== S ==
- Oliver Sacks, neurologist and author
- Carl Sagan, astrobiologist, astronomer, broadcaster, and author
- Kirsten Sanford, neurophysiologist and broadcaster
- Laurie Santos, cognitive scientist, professor of psychology, and host of The Happiness Lab
- Adam Savage, special-effects artist and television personality (MythBusters)
- Walter Warwick Sawyer (or W. W. Sawyer), mathematician, mathematics educator, and author
- Eric Scerri, chemist, historian and philosopher of science, and author
- Lieven Scheire, Belgian comedian, science communicator, founder of the Nerdland Podcast
- Joseph A. Schwarcz, chemist, author, television and radio host
- Garrett P. Serviss, American astronomer and science-fiction writer
- Bassam Z. Shakhashiri, chemist and author
- Tali Sharot, cognitive neuroscientist and writer
- Seth Shostak, astronomer, broadcaster, and author
- Neil Shubin, paleontologist, evolutionary biologist
- George Gaylord Simpson, paleontologist, zoologist and author
- Simon Singh, physicist, mathematician, and author
- Edwin Emery Slosson, chemist, journalist, and editor
- Laura J. Snyder, historian, philosopher, and author
- Mary Somerville, polymath, mathematician, and author
- Paul Stamets, mycologist and author
- Michael Stevens, science-based YouTube content creator
- Iain Stewart, geologist and broadcaster
- Ian Stewart, mathematician and author
- David Suzuki, broadcaster, geneticist, and environmental activist
- Daniel Swain, meteorologist

== T ==
- Eugene Thacker, philosopher and author
- Michelle Thaller, research scientist, and science communicator
- Lewis Thomas, physician, poet, etymologist, and essayist
- Chriet Titulaer, Dutch astronomer, author, and broadcaster
- Colin Tudge, biologist and author
- Neil deGrasse Tyson, astrophysicist and author

== W ==
- Kenneth Walker, surgeon and author
- Alie Ward, television and science podcast host
- Fred Watson, astrophysicist, musician, and author
- James D. Watson, molecular biologist, geneticist, and zoologist
- Kevin Warwick, biomedical scientist, roboticist, and author
- Victor Weisskopf, physicist, science administrator and author
- Michael White, musician and science writer
- Norbert Wiener, mathematician, author; the father of cybernetics
- Simon Winchester, geologist and author
- Robert Winston, medical doctor, scientist, television presenter, and author
- Richard Wiseman, psychologist and author
- Stephen Wolfram, mathematics, theoretical physics, scientific computing
- Lewis Wolpert, developmental biologist, author, and broadcaster
- Peter Wothers, chemist and author
- Andrea Wulf, author

== Y ==
- Ranga Yogeshwar, Luxembourgish physicist and television presenter
- Ed Yong, British-American science journalist and author

== Z ==
- Paul Zaloom, the actor who portrayed an eccentric scientist on the children's television show Beakman's World 1992–1998
- Carl Zimmer, science writer and author of the science blog The Loom
- Marlene Zuk, evolutionary biologist and behavioral ecologist
