= SABAM =

Belgium performance rights organisation

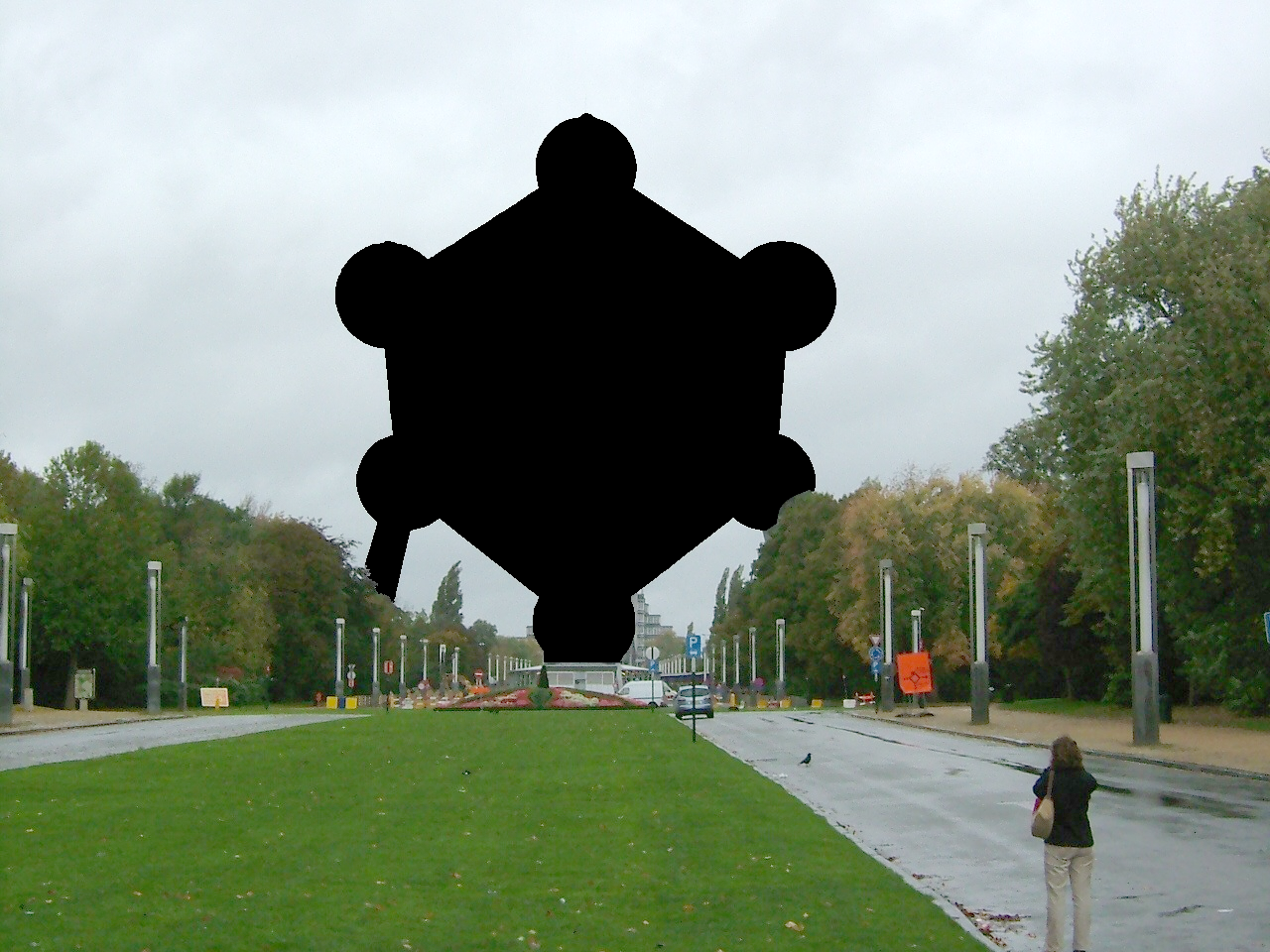
A censored photo of the Atomium in Brussels (2006). At the time there was no freedom of panorama in Belgium, so an image of the sculpture could not be displayed without permission from SABAM or the Atomium Association. It was also necessary to mention "copyright vzw/asbl Atomium".

SABAM is one of the Belgian associations of authors, composers and publishers. The bilingual acronym stands for "Société d'Auteurs Belge – Belgische Auteurs Maatschappij". Their headquarters is located at 41-43 rue des Deux Eglises in Brussels. As of 2023, SABAM had over 48,000 members. In 2023, SABAM distributed €130 million to rightsholders.

== History ==
SABAM was founded in 1922 at the instigation of the composer Emiel Hullebroeck under the name NAVEA. In 1945 it changed to its current name. The SABAM is a Civil Co-operative Society (CVBA) with Belgian authors, composers and publishers as members. They represent the interests of its members in the field of intellectual property rights and collect all the royalties due to its members in Belgium, and sister organizations in other countries (such as Buma/Stemra in the Netherlands), and then distributes these royalties to the copyright holders.

Unlike Buma/Stemra, which is limited to music copyright, SABAM is active in all disciplines where copyrights are involved. The members of SABAM are not only composers, poets and musicians, but also writers, artists, publishers, visual artists, architects, designers, choreographers, photographers, film and television directors, etc.

SABAM also monitors the Internet to check the illegal supply of art. In 2004 SABAM filed a complaint against ISP Tiscali because of the illegal distribution of music over the Internet. A restaurant owner from Brussels was fined because he had a picture of the Atomium on his website.

In October 2007, the SABAM was investigated by a Brussels court on suspicion of falsifying financial statements, the abuse of the confidence of its members and the laundering of misappropriated funds. The investigation, which was started by a complaint by the Walloon composer Philippe Delhaye, is ongoing.

In August 2009 Google removed several music videos for Belgian artists from its video web site YouTube because of complaints made by SABAM.

== Criticism ==
SABAM has received a lot of criticism from festival organisations for claiming money unjustifiably and having very unclear conditions; from artists for late payments (SABAM had a debt of 200 million EUR towards artists in 2010); and from many other people for demanding money in the strangest places, such as libraries for reading stories to toddlers or playing music in a taxi.

SABAM has been criticised publicly in newspapers and TV shows.

For example, in 2011, one of the episodes of the TV show Basta was dedicated to SABAM. As one of the actions, the people from comedy group Neveneffecten, makers of the show, organised a concert with imaginary artists, and sent the playlist to SABAM. SABAM charged as if all imaginary artists were a member of their organisation. SABAM however refunded the money after the episode was shown on the national television. Other ridiculing actions included organising a party on less than 1 m^{2} (since the fees depended on the area of the party, and started only from 1 m^{2}), or calling to SABAM to ask if they had to pay SABAM because their phone rang on a public place with a protected tune.

SABAM has also been ridiculed in other shows. In the 2014 conference, Michael Van Peel referred to the videos posted by ISIL, and concluded it was sad the videos didn't have background music; "[t]hen we could have sent our terrorist organisation: SABAM."

In 2017, festival organizers went to the Commercial Court because SABAM increased their fee by approximately 30%. The festival organizers (who also organize most of the concerts in Belgium) think that SABAM is abusing their monopoly by doing this.

== See also ==
- GEMA
