= Maxime De Winne =

Flemish actor and theatre producer

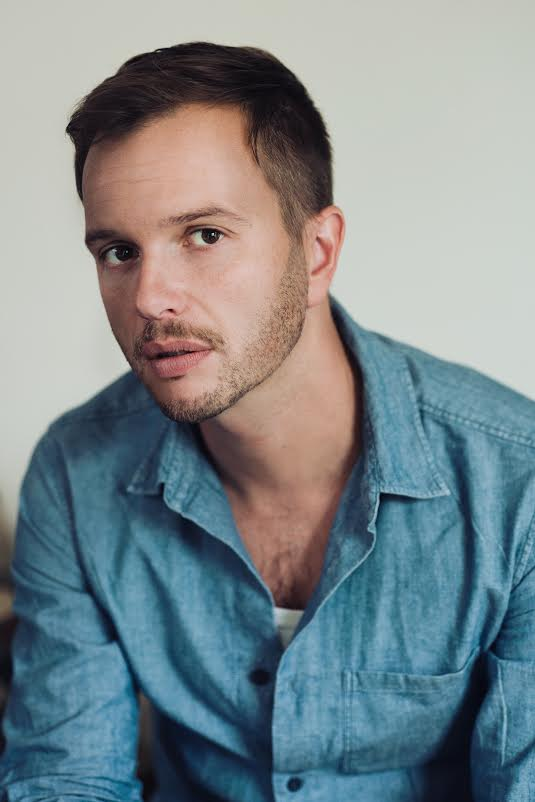
- Maxime De Winne
- Born: Maxime De Winne; 22 June 1977 (age 47); Ghent, Belgium
- Occupation(s): Actor, producer, teacher

Maxime De Winne (born 1977) is a Flemish actor and theatre producer.

De Winne studied ethics at Ghent University, and afterwards, theatre production at the Maastricht Academy of Dramatic Arts, where he graduated in 2006. Until 2010 he had some minor roles in Flemish television shows and commercials.

In 2010 De Winne was one of the hosts of a call game for about 6 months, aired on the Belgian channels vtm and 2BE. On 17 January 2011 it turned out De Winne was a mole who actually worked for Woestijnvis and Neveneffecten. De Winne went undercover to show Flanders that the games are scams. His records, taken with hidden cameras, were shown in Basta. On 18 January 2011 vtm and 2BE cancelled all call games.

As from October 2011, De Winne got a main role in Thuis, a famous Belgian soap opera, playing Tibo Timmermans. Tibo is in a gay relationship with Franky Bomans and they got married on the last episode of season 17.
