= Kabouter Wesley =

Belgian comic book series

- Kabouter Wesley in a menacing pose
- Author: Jonas Geirnaert
- Current status/schedule: Terminated
- Launch date: 2008
- End date: 2010
- Syndicate(s): Humo
- Genre(s): Humor comics, gag-a-day, self-reflexive comics, metafictional comics

Kabouter Wesley
- Genre: Animation; Comedy
- Created by: Jonas Geirnaert
- Developed by: Jonas Geirnaert
- Voices of: Jonas Geirnaert; Jelle De Beule
- Theme music composer: Klaus Wunderlich
- Country of origin: Belgium (Flanders)
- Original language: Dutch
- No. of seasons: 1
- No. of episodes: 37

Production
- Executive producer: Humo
- Running time: 1 to 2 minutes

Original release
- Network: VRT
- Release: August 31, 2009 – May 25, 2010

Kabouter Wesley (English: Gnome Wesley) is a Flemish/Belgian series of comics and short animated cartoons about a grumpy and violent kabouter (gnome), made by Jonas Geirnaert. Both the drawing style and the content are purposely made naïve and amateurish and the situations are surreal and violent. There is also a lot of insulting and toilet humour in the series.

== Concept ==
Wesley is a gnome wearing a red hat and suit. He is typically cranky and short-tempered. He often has surreal adventures which are told in one-page gag-a-day stories, where he encounters various people, other gnomes and anthropomorphic characters who either confuse him and/or annoy him. As a result, he often gets angry and violent. Both the comic strip as well as the animated TV spin-off are drawn in a simple, naïve style.

== History ==
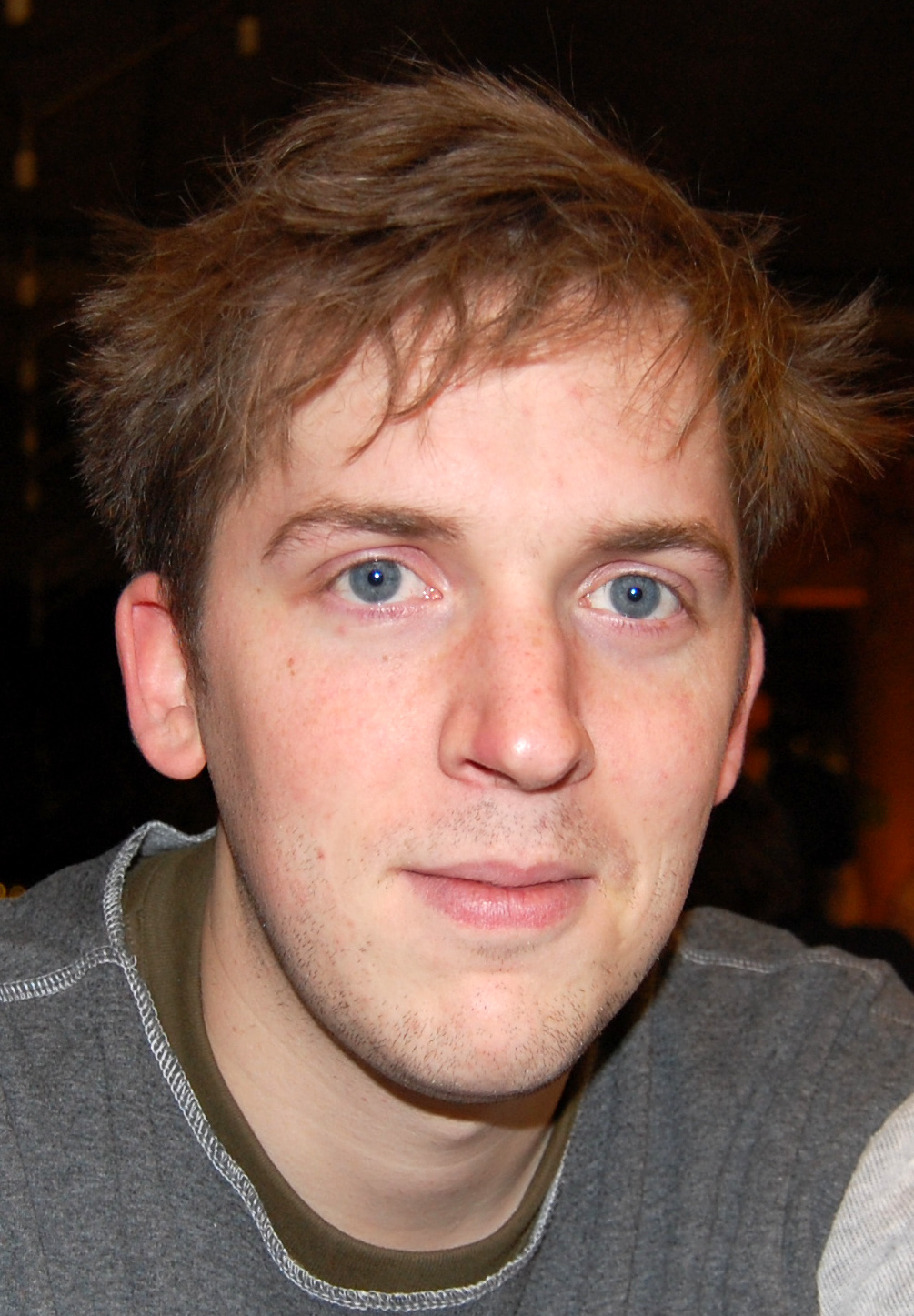
Jonas Geirnaert

Geirnaert invented Wesley the Gnome while creating his animated short film Flatlife (winner of the jury prize at the Cannes Film Festival) in 2004. As this film required him to be very perfectionistic and thorough, he drew Wesley the Gnome as a side project and intentionally spent no time on good graphics, interesting plotlines or other recurring characters. In 2008, the comics were published in the magazine Humo. Despite their popularity, Geirnaert decided to terminate the series after only 27 episodes. In autumn 2009, Wesley the Gnome was granted new life through a series of animated shorts, broadcast once a week on the human interest TV series Man Bijt Hond. Originally, all the shorts were based on the comics Geirnaert drew earlier, but as this material ran short he created several more episodes, which were once again pre-published in Humo. When the TV episodes were uploaded on YouTube as well, the cartoons gained an even broader audience, especially in The Netherlands. Due to the cult appeal, Geirnaert appeared in several Flemish and Dutch media.

Geirnaert provides Wesley's voice in all the cartoons, typically after roughing up his vocal cords in warming-up sessions. Jelle De Beule, who also collaborates with him in their comedy group Neveneffecten, does the other voices. The animation is made by the Volstok Telefunken studios. The background music is Hammond organ music by Klaus Wunderlich. Other tunes used include "La Felicidad" from the album The Golden Sound of Hammond (aka Hammond Für Millionen), "Hasta La Vista" from the album Hammond Pops 10 and even the Brazilian song "Tico-Tico no Fubá". Besides Klaus Wunderlich's music, "Coconut" by Electronic System was also used.

The comics and cartoons quickly became popular with audiences, albeit somewhat polarizing with others who didn't enjoy the intentional silliness and vulgarity. In 2010, a radio commercial for Humo, where Geirnaert provided the voice of Wesley caused controversy due to a joke where Wesley threatens some children with sending them to a "special education" school if they don't obey him. Pedagogues and teachers from schools for mentally challenged children felt the joke was offensive and stigmatized them. Wesley was soon used in all kinds of merchandising, including on the streetcars who drive to the Belgian coast. A video game spin-off was also created, in collaboration with Geirnaert.

In 2010, Geirnaert once again terminated his series because he ran out of ideas. The same year a huge comic book collecting all the Kabouter Wesley cartoons was published by Borgerhoff & Lamberigts. It was later also released in a smaller format. The animated shorts are not available on video, though they have been collected on video as a one-shot gift with one 2010 issue of Humo.

== Episodes ==
No.	Original title (top) English title (bottom)	Directed by	Written by	Original release date	Prod. code
1	"Muil slaan" "Smack face"	Jonas Geirnaert	Jonas Geirnaert	August 31, 2009	1
Kabouter Wesley wants to fight with a mushroom and to smack his face. The mushroom, however, challenges him, saying "knock yourself out, I don't have a face anyway". The gnome who lives in the mushroom can't be smacked either because he wears glasses.
2	"Egel" "Hedgehog"	Jonas Geirnaert	Jonas Geirnaert	September 7, 2009	2
Kabouter Wesley runs into a hedgehog who is telling lame jokes. When he gives the hedgehog a beating, the hedgehog calls the police.
3	"Varkenspest" "Pig plague"	Jonas Geirnaert	Jonas Geirnaert	September 14, 2009	3
A pig, which looks like a badly drawn cat, runs into kabouter Wesley. It claims to be running away from the threat of extermination because of the pig plague. Two exterminators come looking for the pig. One of these exterminators continuously makes spelling errors in his spoken language, which the other exterminator is able to hear.
4	"Tovergieter" "Magic watering can"	Jonas Geirnaert	Jonas Geirnaert	September 21, 2009	4
Kabouter Wesley meets an enchanted watering can that sets on fire when someone says "turbo turbo". Soon it seems that the enchantment also works on others.
5	"Robots" "Robots"	Jonas Geirnaert	Jonas Geirnaert	September 28, 2009	5
Kabouter Wesley is visited by robots from the future. This 'future' more precisely being next week. Each of these robots is trying to sell him stickers for the Red Cross.
6	"Lotto" "Lottery"	Jonas Geirnaert	Jonas Geirnaert	October 5, 2009	6
Kabouter Wesley plays the lottery but loses, causing him to get angry and work out his aggression on others. Suddenly it seems that he has won, but his winning ticket has been taken by one of his victims.
7	"Computer" "Computer"	Jonas Geirnaert	Jonas Geirnaert	October 12, 2009	7
Kabouter Wesley and his computer Sloeber (poor bastard) participate in a competition for computers. As the result of a math computation, Sloeber solves a case and proves that Gnome Piet is a thief. He also shows an obscene picture of Gnome Jan.
8	"Neushoorn" "Rhinoceros"	Jonas Geirnaert	Jonas Geirnaert	October 19, 2009	8
Kabouter Wesley orders a pizza calzone, but keeps getting rhino instead. Also it emerges that these rhinos are not allowed to drink coke.
9	"Vakantie" "Holiday"	Jonas Geirnaert	Jonas Geirnaert	October 26, 2009	9
During a skiing holiday, kabouter Wesley skis into a mountain goat which later turns out to be the king of Mongolia.
10	"Telefoon" "Phone"	Jonas Geirnaert	Jonas Geirnaert	November 2, 2009	10
Because the telephone company is conducting technical maintenance, kabouter Wesley has to phone using the refrigerator.
11	"Diefdolfijn" "Thief dolphin"	Jonas Geirnaert	Jonas Geirnaert	November 9, 2009	11
While at the beach, a dolphin calls in Wesley's help with rescuing orphans who are on a sinking boat. This turns out to be a trap, however, for the dolphin to steal Wesley's wallet.
12	"Eend" "Duck"	Jonas Geirnaert	Jonas Geirnaert	November 16, 2009	12
Kabouter Wesley sees a UFO landing with a duck emerging from it. He takes a picture (of the duck only) and sends it to a newspaper.
13	"Brandverzekering" "Fire insurance"	Jonas Geirnaert	Jonas Geirnaert	November 23, 2009	13
Kabouter Wesley does not want to buy fire insurance. When the salesman tells him that having insurance is mandatory by law, Wesley replies that eating one's own excrements is also mandatory by law.
14	"Bulldozer" "Bulldozer"	Jonas Geirnaert	Jonas Geirnaert	November 30, 2009	14
An impulsive person throws over kabouter Wesley's home. The responsible, who is half-gnome-half-bulldozer, tells his sad life story to explain his actions.
15	"Gelijke kansen" "Equal opportunity"	Jonas Geirnaert	Jonas Geirnaert	December 7, 2009	15
Because of equal treatment, kabouter Wesley is forced to have more women appear in his episodes. He hires a woman, but is not sure what to do with her.
16	"Kleurwiezen" "Colour whist"	Jonas Geirnaert	Jonas Geirnaert	December 14, 2009	16
Kabouter Wesley gets a phone call from his future self. His future self has met aliens who want to learn how to play colour whist, but he needs a fourth player.
17	"Zonder ogen" "Eyeless"	Jonas Geirnaert	Jonas Geirnaert	January 4, 2010	17
During reading, Wesley's lamp breaks down.
18	"Wat eten we?" "What's for dinner?"	Jonas Geirnaert	Jonas Geirnaert	January 11, 2010	18
Kabouter Wesley buys a takeaway pitta. He takes the pitta home and gives it a tour of his house. After a while, the pitta gets hungry and asks "what's for dinner?".
19	"Hallo politie?" "Hello, police?"	Jonas Geirnaert	Jonas Geirnaert	January 18, 2010	19
Two gnomes play tricks on a police officer. When kabouter Wesley goes to see him and asks for help, the policeman, who believes another prank is pulled on him, can no longer stand it and kills Wesley.
20	"Gaan we muilen?" "Shall we snog?"	Jonas Geirnaert	Jonas Geirnaert	January 25, 2010	20
Kabouter Wesley meets a small yellow bird that invites him to see a movie. Together they go watch Titanic at the cinema.
21	"Sarcastische opmerkingen" "Sarcastic remarks"	Jonas Geirnaert	Jonas Geirnaert	February 1, 2010	21
Kabouter Wesley meets a guy who seems to be making sarcastic remarks. Wesley has trouble figuring this out.
22–23	"Reisbureau" "Travel agency"	Jonas Geirnaert	Jonas Geirnaert	February 8, 2010 / February 16, 2010	22 / 23
Two-part story. Kabouter Wesley wants to book a trip, but hits his head against the travel agency's low-hanging sign.
24	"Aardbeien" "Strawberries"	Jonas Geirnaert	Jonas Geirnaert	February 22, 2010	24
Gnome Wesley wants to get pilot license when suddenly 2 aliens appear, telling him they want earthlings to eat. They have a slip of the tongue, however, and say "Strawberries".
25	"Gênante momenten" "Awkward Moments"	Jonas Geirnaert	Jonas Geirnaert	March 1, 2010	25
Gnome Wesley sits in a bar and says that the film Memento sucks. After that the whole story plays backwards.
26	"Zee-egel" "Sea urchin"	Jonas Geirnaert	Jonas Geirnaert	March 8, 2010	26
Gnome Wesley meets a sea urchin who asks for a lift to the sea. Gnome Wesley takes him to his car...
