= AI Song Contest 2020 =

Season of a song contest

Date and venue
- Final: 12 May 2020
- Venue: Hilversum, Netherlands

Production
- Host broadcaster: VPRO, NPO 3FM and NPO Innovation
- Director: Daan Veldhuizen
- Executive producer: Karen van Dijk; Sharon Yosef; Jonathan Maas
- Presenters: Lieven Scheire

Participants
- Number of entries: 13

Vote
- Voting system: 50% jury (1–12 points), 50% audience (average of online ratings)
- Winning song: Australia "Beautiful the World"

The AI Song Contest 2020 was the inaugural edition of the AI Song Contest, organised by the Dutch public broadcaster VPRO, in collaboration with NPO 3FM and NPO Innovation. It was held on 12 May 2020 in the Netherlands and was presented by Lieven Scheire. Thirteen teams from eight countries participated in the contest. The contest was won by Uncanny Valley from Australia with the song "Beautiful the World".

== Format ==
Each participating team had to submit a "Eurovision-style" song of up to three minutes that had been composed using artificial intelligence (AI). Human input was allowed, but the more AI was used, the more points the entry would get from the jury. The entries were also evaluated by the public through online ratings. The winner was announced in a live show on 12 May 2020.

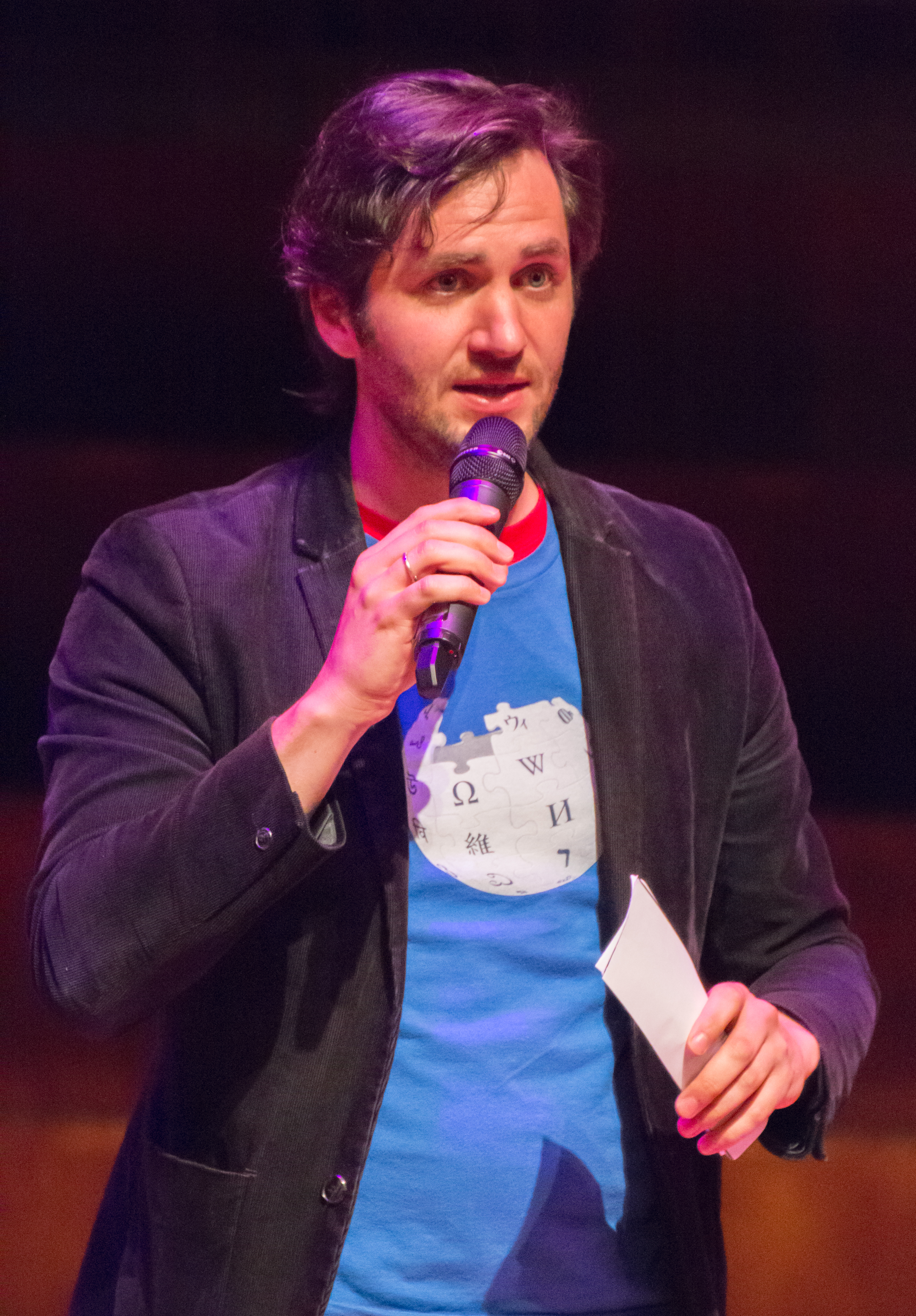
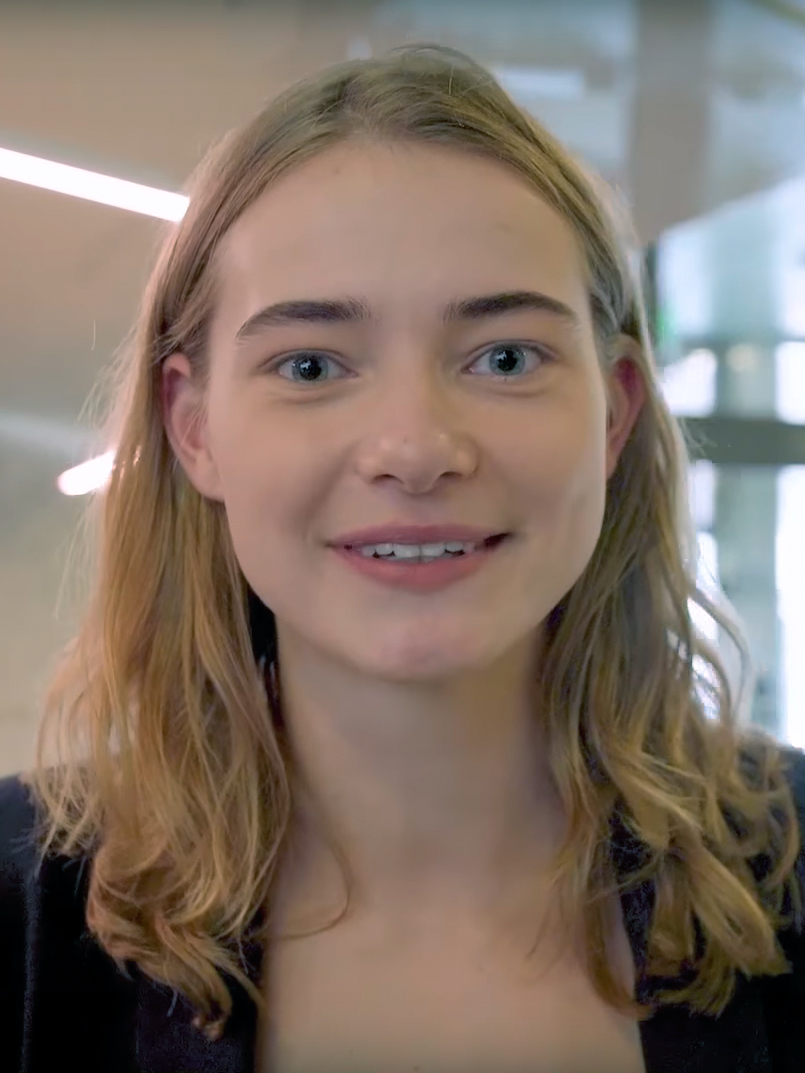
Lieven Scheire and Emma Wortelboer

=== Presenter and spokespersons ===
The live show was hosted by Belgian comedian Lieven Scheire. The points from the online voting were announced by Dutch television presenter Emma Wortelboer, who had been the Netherlands' spokesperson for the Eurovision Song Contest 2019. Dutch composer and AI researcher Vincent Koops revealed the points awarded by the jury.

=== Expert panel ===
The jury consisted of three AI experts, who assessed each entry based on the use of artificial intelligence in the songwriting process:

- Vincent Koops (RTL Nederland)
- Anna Huang (Google Brain)
- Ed Newton-Rex (ByteDance)

== Competing entries ==
The live show took place on 12 May 2020 at 20:30 CEST and was broadcast via a live stream on YouTube. As there were no pre-qualifying rounds, multiple teams from each country could enter the competition. The contest featured the following competing entries:

Country	Team	Song	Team members	Points			Place
Country	Team	Song	Team members	Jury	Public	Total	Place
Australia	Uncanny Valley	"Beautiful the World"	Charlton Hill; Caroline Pegram; Justin Shave; Oliver Brown; Alexandra Uitdenbogerd; Brendan Wright; Sally-Ann Williams	10	9.8	19.8	1
Belgium	Beatroots	"Violent Delights Have Violent Ends"	Nicolas Gelders; Tim Leers; Nicolas Morandi; Joris Schrauwen; Dorian Van den Heede; Frederik de Smedt	6	5.3	11.3	8
Belgium	Polaris	"Princess"	Kenny Helsens; Andries Rosseau; Sebastiaan Van den Branden; Ward Van Driessche	4	8.1	12.1	7
France	Algomus and Friends	"I Keep Counting"	Gianluca Micchi; Louis Bigo; Mathieu Giraud; Richard Groult; Florence Levé	8	7.5	15.5	4
France	DataDada	"Je secoue le monde"	Bastien Didier; Albertine Meunier; Sylvie Tissot; Thu Trinh-Bouvier; Julien Levesque	5	6	11	9
Germany	Dadabots and Portrait XO	"I'll Marry You, Punk Come"	CJ Carr; Zack Zukowski; Portrait XO	12	7.4	19.4	2
Germany	Ligatur	"Offshore in Deep Water"	Ullika Scholz; André Röhrig	4	4	8	12
Germany	OVGneUrovision	"Traveller in Time"	Richhiey Thomas	5	4.6	9.6	11
Netherlands	Can AI Kick It	"Abbus"	Janne Spijkervet; Arran Lyon; John Ashley Burgoyne; Bence Halpern; Anja Volk; Iris Ren; Thijs Ratsma; Manon Blanke; Anne van Ede; Thijs Hendrickx; Otto Mättas; Yannick Gregoire; Berit Janssen; Annelies Termeer; Willie Wartaal	10	7.8	17.8	3
Netherlands	Computd, Shuman and Angel-Eye	"I Write a Song"	Dirk Bongers; Marcell Ignéczi; Pieter Schaap; René Shuman; Angela Shuman	5	8.8	13.8	5
Sweden	KTH, KMH and Doremir	"Come To Ge Ther"	Sven Ahlbäck; Pietro Bolcato; Bob Sturm	4	6.9	10.9	10
Switzerland	New Piano	"Painful Words"	Krzysztof Ciesielski; Basil Philipp	2	3.2	5.2	13
United Kingdom	Brentry	"Hope Rose High"	Nancy Carlisle; Tom Collins	8	5.7	13.7	6

== See also ==
- Eurovision Song Contest 2020
- Eurovision: Europe Shine a Light
