= Rik Verheye =

Belgian actor

Rik Verheye (born 24 December 1986, Knokke) is a Flemish actor.

He graduated in 2009 at the Herman Teirlinck Instituut.

He was active in productions of the theatres Monty (Voorproef op fragmenten uit de nieuwe wereld), Olympique Dramatique (Adams appels), and FC Bergman (two pieces of Harold Pinter: De thuiskomst and Het verjaardagsfeest).

In 2010, he had a starring role in the film Adem, where he played Jimmy. He also participates in the film Groenten uit Balen and in the fiction series De Vijfhoek.

He starred in the television role of Daan in De Rodenburgs and had in 2010–2011 a leading role as Anthony De Keersmaecker in the daily telenovela Ella on VTM. In 2012, he appeared in De Vijfhoek. In 2013, he played a leading role in both Danni Lowinski and Crème de la Crème. He also had guest roles in Zone Stad, Witse, and Code 37.

Since September 8, 2016 he can be seen on Vier in the much discussed sex comedy Callboys by Jan Eelen, performing as the long-haired, irascible escort Jay Vleugels.

On December 26, 2010, he made a marriage proposal during halftime of the football match Cercle Brugge – Standard Luik (1 – 0) from the highest football ranks in Belgium. It turned out to be a recorded publicity action promoting the Knokke-Heist municipality. The clip was broadcast on American news channel NBC and went viral on YouTube, resulting in over a million views.
