= Dufault =

Dufault is a surname. Notable people with the surname include:

- Austin Dufault (born 1990), American basketball player
- Danielle Dufault (born c. 1988), Canadian artist
- François Dufault (fl. 1604–1665), French Baroque composer and lutenist
- Jeremie Dufault (born 1978), Member of the Washington House of Representatives, attorney, and businessman
- Luce Dufault (born 1966), Canadian singer
- Maryeve Dufault (born 1982), Canadian-American racing driver
- Peter Kane Dufault (1923–2013), American poet
- Pierre Dufault (1934–2025), Canadian journalist and sports commentator
