= Wouter Vandenhaute =

Belgian businessman

- Born: 16 February 1962 (age 64); Ghent
- Education: Katholieke Universiteit Leuven
- Occupations: Entrepreneur; Journalist; TV
- Known for: Woestijnvis; Flanders Classics
- Spouse: Catherine Van Eylen (married)

Wouter Vandenhaute (born 16 February 1962) is a Belgian entrepreneur, television producer. and former sports-journalist. He is currently managing director of the Belgian media holding De Vijver, which includes the TV production company Woestijnvis and TV channel VIER. Vandenhaute married VRT sports journalist Catherine Van Eylen.

== Biography ==
Wouter Vandenhaute was born in Ghent, the son of Godelieve Kiebooms and Gerard Vandenhaute. His grandfather was Louis Kiebooms, who was editor of the Gazet van Antwerpen for more than 10 years. In the early 1980s Vandenhaute studied physical education at the Katholieke Universiteit Leuven. After graduating, he went as a journalist to work for the weekly magazine HUMO, the newspaper De Morgen and as a sports editor of the then BRT. At BRT he worked with colleagues like Mark Uytterhoeven and Carl Huybrechts, contributing to the TV program Sportweekend. He also presented the sports news in Het Journal.

In the early 1990s, Vandenhaute presented with Uytterhoeven the comedy talk show Het huis van wantrouwen [The House of distrust]. Between 1992 and 1995, after Het huis van wantrouwen had finished Vandenhaute went to pay channel Filmnet as a football commentator.

=== Woestijnvis and De Vijver ===
In 1997 Vandenhaute founded together with Jan and Erik Huyse Watté the production Woestijnvis, that initially exclusively made programs for VRT. Thanks to TV personalities such as Uytterhoeven, Rob Vanoudenhoven, Tom Lenaerts and Bart De Pauw, and TV shows like Man bijt hond [Man bites dog], de Mol and Alles Kan Beter [Everything Will Better], Woestijnvis grew into one of the most successful production companies in Flanders. In 2000, De Mol was awarded the prestigious Rose d'Or of Montreux. The program was further sold to about 50 countries.

In 2000, then called Vlaamse uitgeversmaatschappij (VUM) became a twenty percent shareholder in Woestijnvis. That year the production company brought the Bonanza weekly magazine. The magazine flopped and was closed after only thirty editions. In the field of television programs Vandenhautes production company experienced continued success through the turn of the century with episodes of the quiz program De Pappenheimers and De Slimste Mens ter Wereld [The Smartest Person in the World], regularly reached more than one million viewers. Even fiction series like Het eiland [The Island], De Parelvissers [The Pearl Fishers] and Van vlees en bloed [Of flesh and blood] were a success. In 2005 Vandenhaute was nominated for Manager of the Year by the financial-economic magazine Trends. The prize eventually went to Jan Callewaert.

In 2010, the exclusivity contract between VRT and Woestijnvis was not renewed. That year Vandenhaute was made CEO of De Vijver, the holding company whose properties included Woestijnvis, 49 percent of the Humo magazine.

In 2011, De Vijver purchased with Corelio and Sanoma Media TV channels VT4 and VIJFtv for an amount estimated between 100 and 150 million. After the acquisition VT4 was renamed VIER [Four] and VIJFtv to VIJF [Five]. In 2012 with purchase complete, Woestijnvis on air talent and programs were transferred to VIER. In 2014, Sanoma share in De Vijver was sold to Telenet, which became one of the three shareholders of the holding company. As a term of the deal, the weekly magazine Humo again became wholly owned by Sanoma. In 2015, Vandenhaute was made chairman of the board of directors of De Vijver and therefore quit as CEO of the holding company.

=== Other projects ===
In 2009, Vandenhaute who is an avid cycling fan, bought Flemish cycling classics like the Tour of Flanders and the Omloop Het Nieuwsblad. A year later he founded Flanders Classics. Since then Flanders Classics is responsible for the organization of six Flemish cycling classics (Tour of Flanders, Omloop Het Nieuwsblad, Gent–Wevelgem, Dwars door Vlaanderen, Scheldeprijs and Brabantse Pijl).

In 2011 Vandenhaute endured much criticism when he announced that would be removing the climb of the Muur van Geraardsbergen from the route of the Tour of Flanders.

Vandenhaute is also a supporter of football club RSC Anderlecht. In 2009 it became known that he was even in the picture as a shareholder of the football club. In January 2021 he succeeded Marc Coucke as chairman of RSC Anderlecht.

Vandenhaute is owner of the restaurant Couvert Couvert in Egenhoven (Heverlee). In November 2005, the restaurant received a Michelin star. He is also good friends with the Belgian chef Geert Van Hecke. He is a member of the advisory board of the Itinera Institute think-tank.
