= Sint-Lodewijkscollege =

Sint-Lodewijkscollege ("Saint Louis's college") may refer to:

- Sint-Lodewijkscollege (Lokeren), a Catholic high school in Belgium
- Sint-Lodewijkscollege (Bruges), a refuge for the Abbey of Saint Bertin
