= Callboys =

Belgian television series

- Created by: Jan Eelen
- Starring: Matteo Simoni; Rik Verheye; Stef Aerts; Bart Hollanders
- Country of origin: Belgium
- Original language: Dutch
- No. of seasons: 2
- No. of episodes: 14

Production
- Producers: Peter Ceustermans; Hilde De Laere; Michiel Devlieger
- Running time: 50 min.
- Production company: Woestijnvis

Original release
- Network: VIER
- Release: 8 September 2016 – 17 October 2019

Callboys is a 2016 Belgian TV series produced by Woestijnvis for the Flemish channel VIER. The series stars Matteo Simoni, Rik Verheye, Stef Aerts and Bart Hollanders. It was directed by Jan Eelen. The series revolves around the misadventures of three male prostitutes and their secretary.

== Episodes ==
Each episode lasts approximately 45 minutes. The television series consists of two seasons:

- Season 1 (7 episodes) - from September 8, 2016 to October 20, 2016
- Season 2 (7 episodes) - from September 5, 2019 to October 17, 2019

== Plot ==
=== Season 1 ===
Jay, Devon, and Wesley run "Callboys", a general partnership which offers paid sex dates for women. Their working office is in a loft although they only meet with women on location: in a hotel or at the clients' home. Some months ago, they assigned Randy as their secretary. Devon is the favorite. He is a rather muscled, good looking boy but is dumb and naïve. Jay, a "magician" with very long blond hair, is short tempered. Wesley is very logical and not proud to be a prostitute. He is a procrastinator and runs away instead of solving problems. During disputes, which frequently occur, it is mostly Randy who acts as a mediator.

The first big issue starts when Randy admits to have had a date with Mieke under the name of Callboys. Mieke wants to meet Randy again so he needs permission of the other three as he was not hired as a callboy. Jay rejects the request but changes his mind after Randy knocked down Miguel, a shady male prostitute who got into troubles with Jay before.

Devon had a date with Wendy. She works for Maverick, a company which produces sex toys. She and her business partner Fonda convince Devon and Jay to take a personalized stamp of their penis and to bring it on the market as dildos under the brand Dilldoys which is almost immediately renamed to Calltoys. Wesley falls in love with Fonda but she is not interested as he is a callboy so he quits his job only to find out Fonda is still not interested in him. In meantime Randy took over Wesley's job and also decided to have his personalized dildo. Wesley, determined the dildos will be a success after he met the rich Kjetl Benson, CEO of FuckArmy, increases the order so they end up with 1500 dildos. The other three decide to temporary cancel all dates to focus on the selling's and marketing.

Sigi, a young non-outed gay secretly in love with Devon, is called to modify the website of Callboys. An expensive movie is shot together with some clips in which the Callboys unpack their dildo. The video is put on social media but removed within the hour as Sigi used scenes from licensed movies, such as Twilight, without permission. Furthermore, during filming the lens of a flying drone got broken and Jay did not take the insurance option so they have to pay around 3500 euro to have it fixed. Wesley splits out the name of Calltoys to Kjetl. When Sigi finds out FuckArmy registered the name of Calltoys as a trademark, he runs away, leaving the current website unusable.

As the men did not sell any of their dildos, they arrange a meeting with Kjetl to have them distributed via FuckArmy. It is only then they are informed the name "Calltoys" can not be used anymore. At the end Kjetl offers to buy all 600 dildos of Devon, 100 dildos of Randy and none of Jay. Jay is not amused and starts a word fight. Against all odds he is supported by Randy so the deal fails. Wesley tries to convince some smaller sex shops to distribute their dildos but none of them are interested and, even more, most of them got exclusive contracts with FuckArmy to only distribute their sex toys.

Some days later, Sigi unexpectedly turns up with a brand new website. He registered the name "Dilldoys" as trademark so sales can start. However, Devon announces to quit Callboys as he got a job offer from FuckArmy. This means the website once again needs to be modified.

The remaining Callboys are not pleased as the brand "Calltoys" is a huge success as from day 1. FuckArmy distributes the label in many European countries and the label even won an award as best newcomer. The Callboys were only able to sell 100 of Randy's Dilldoys in a small shop somewhere in The Netherlands.

Devon is astonished when he finds out his job content is not only limited to women and he is now forced to have sex with Japanese business men who will distribute "Calltoys" in Asia. Wesley started escort again but is nauseated when he has to suck on a woman's hallux. She also complains Wesley smells as he had drunk alcohol beverages. Jay's date is a disaster after he suggested a client to also use his dildo. The woman runs into the bathroom with screams, asks some refund and sends Jay away. On his way to Callboys his motorcycle gets broken. Whilst Jay is calling to Randy to have him picked up, the motorcycle is run over by a truck and thus a total loss.

Not much later, Jay is alone at Callboys and decides to do some fitness by hanging upside down on Devon's hanging bar with inversion gravity boots, although Devon warned multiple times this might not be done when alone. Jay is not able to release him from the hanging bar resulting he hangs upside down for almost 10 hours. He is found in the morning by the downstairs neighbour Hans Rimmer and taken into hospital. He is paralyzed from his hips to his toes and even his penis is affected. He barely can speak due to damage on his Adam's apple. The good news is that the doctors claim this is only temporary and all of this will recover over time. When Devon hears about the news, he visits the Callboys. During a phone call to Jay, Devon suggests he will do his hair. Devon designs a hair decoration by using the brake cables and some other attributes from Jay's motorcycle. Jay is happy with the decoration but it is the root cause of his dead not much later. Whilst taking the elevator a part of the brake cable get stuck between the doors resulting he is crushed between the downgoing elevator and the walls.

During the funeral, Jay's father admits he never was a good father. He became a widower when Jay and his twin brother Jeremy - of which nobody was aware - were only fourteen years old. The family fell apart and Jeremy now even did not turn up for the burial of his brother. After the ceremony, Devon, Jay, Randy and Jay's father spread out the ashes of Jay. At that time a taxi arrives and Jeremy is introduced. He has exact same personality as Jay.

Some months later, it turns out Jeremy joined Callboys as a secretary. Devon also returned - most probably as he stated many times not to want have sex with men.

=== Season 2 ===
Due to financial issues, Callboys moved to a wooden cabin in the woods. Devon has a new idea: he will now be a hairdresser-escort. Although he does not have any experience with cutting hair, it is a success. After the death of granny, Wesley became an addict to drugs. He is sent to rehab. Before he met a woman who is participating in some online share selling application. Wesley invested all of the money he inherited from granny. The shares are a success and he becomes a multimillionaire.

Due to some incident with a dildo of Jay, the wooden cabin burns down. Thanks to the money of Wesley, Callboys are able to rent a business office. Randy - who trusted the real estate agent blindly - rents a space which is much too big. Besides that, all kinds of unnecessary investments are done.

Sigi is hired to make a movie as tribute to Jay. It is the intention to launch a weather balloon on which a dildo of Jay is attached. The weather balloon goes up and explodes in stratosphere. It falls down to earth and hits the dog of Mike Sleeckx. Thus, Callboys are once again responsible for the death of Mike's pet. Furthermore, an airliner almost crashed due to the falling projectile.

Anthony finds out his wife is having a lesbian affair and they decide to divorce.

Worse managing and other incidents are the root cause . As a result, Callboys are once again bankrupt but they do find a solution. To celebrate this, they have a party in the jacuzzi on the first floor. But the floor cannot hold the weight and collapses. Unfortunately, Jeremy does not survive. He ends up in the aftermath where he is reunited with his twin brother.

== Cast ==
- Matteo Simoni as Devon Macharis
- Stef Aerts as Wesley Biets
- Rik Verheye as Jay / Jeremy Vleugels
- Bart Hollanders as Randy Paret
- Katrin Lohmann as Fonda Beckers
- Joke Emmers as Wendy
- Tom Dewispelaere as Kjetl Benson
- Jelle De Beule as Sigi
- Yves Degryse as Anthony Biets
- Lea Couzin as grandmother Biets
- Bruno Vanden Broecke as Mike Sleeckx
- Bill Barberis as Luca
- Gert Winckelmans as Koy
- Peter Ceustermans as Hanz Rimmer

== Critical reception ==
Callboys was received very well by the general public. The series has been praised for its humor.

== Trivia ==
- Callboys has many references to other series, mostly ones which were also directed by Jan Eelen such as Het Eiland and In de gloria. There are even characters from those series which turn up in Callboys such as Hans Rimmer (employee at Cynalco Medics in Het Eiland and now a consultant in the company below the loft) and Hilde and Geert (two recurring characters in In de gloria)
- On 17 October 2016 Bart Hollanders gave away a "Randy Paret dildo" as birthday present during "Linde's Wake Up Call" on the national radio station Studio Brussel.
- Matteo Simoni was already sure half-naked pictures of him would circulate on the internet, so he posted them himself before the first episode was aired.
