= Neveneffecten (cabaret) =

- Neveneffecten; Left to right: Jelle De Beule, Jonas Geirnaert, Lieven Scheire, Koen De Poorter
- Notable work: Neveneffecten (2005); Willy's en Marjetten (2006); Basta (2010)

Comedy career
- Years active: 2002 - present
- Medium: Television, Theatre
- Genres: Sketch comedy, Surreal humour
- Members: Jonas Geirnaert; Lieven Scheire; Koen De Poorter; Jelle De Beule
- Website: Neveneffecten

Neveneffecten is a Flemish cabaret quartet formed by Jonas Geirnaert, Lieven Scheire, Koen De Poorter and Jelle De Beule.

== History ==
Their first TV appearance (in Man bijt hond) consisted of cousins Jonas Geirnaert and Lieven Scheire beating up a big teddybear dressed as giant bunnies and was badly received by the audience. This controversial sketch caused Koen De Poorter to contact the duo, and he soon became a member of Neveneffecten.

In 2003 they won the jury prize at the Groninger Studenten Cabaret Festival and a year later they adopted Jelle De Beule as their fourth member. He had until then been their, allegedly extremely incompetent, stage technician.

By 2004 Neveneffecten were touring Flanders and The Netherlands with their first full theatre show Zinloos Geweldig. However the initial aim was to write sketches for television. They made a first series of the sketch show Neveneffecten for Canvas in 2005. A year later, in 2006, they worked together with comedian Bart De Pauw in Willy's en Marjetten on één, which was their first prime time slot. In 2007 they wrote another 5 episodes for the second season of Neveneffecten.

In 2011 their TV-show Basta caused a lot of controversy. In the first episode, they had fooled the Flemish press for one year with a fake research center Data Driven. In the second episode, the Neveneffecten showed how fraudulent the quiz channels were. In less than 24 hours after the episode, the Flemish television stations ceased the broadcasting of quiz channels because the big controversy that was created by the Neveneffecten.

== Shows ==
- Rechtstreeks en Integraal (15 min) - 2002
- Coherentie voor Beginners (30 min) - 2003
- Zinloos Geweldig (90 min) - 2004 and resumed in 2007
