= Guy Mortier =

Flemish journalist (born 1943)

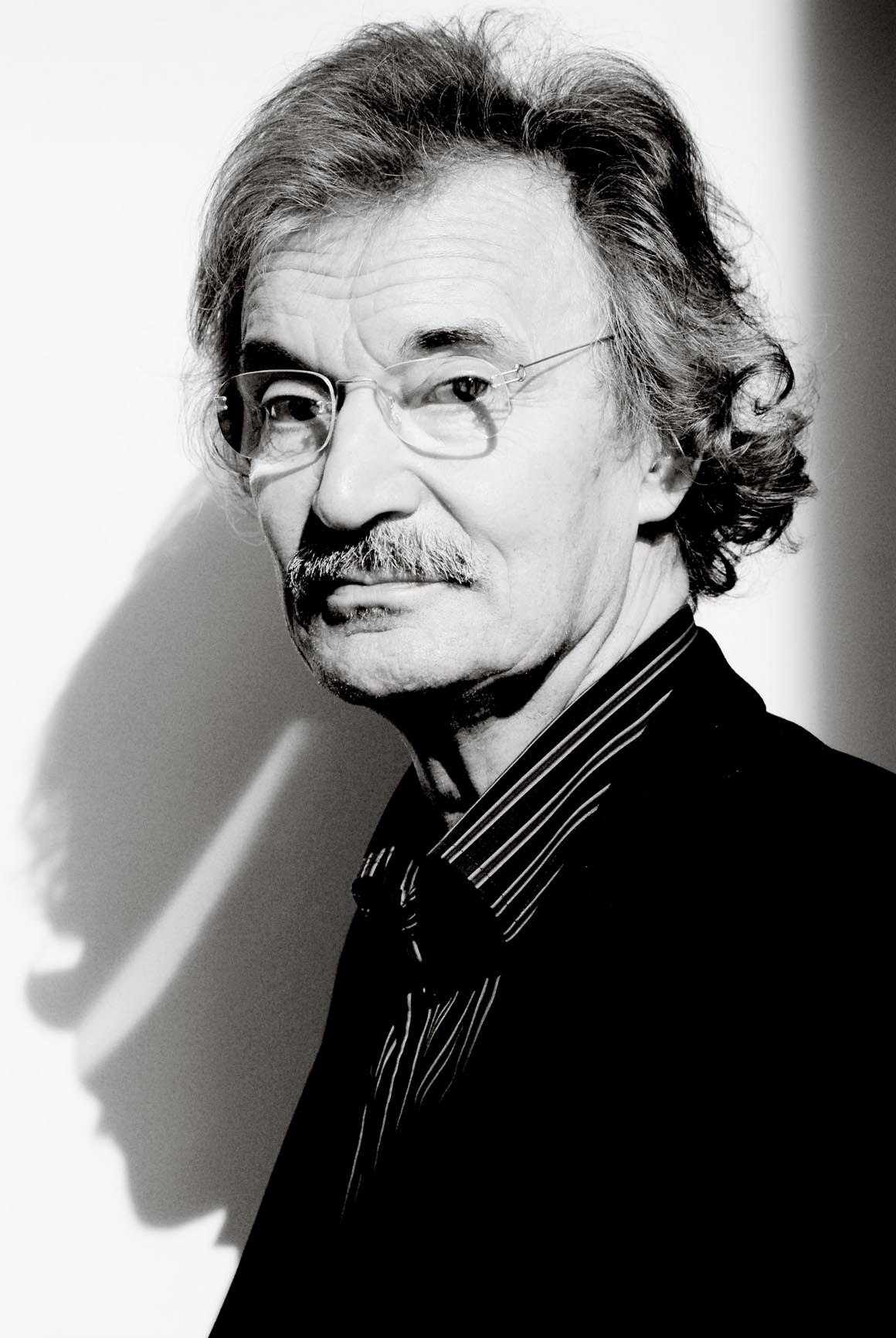
- Guy Mortier (2006)
- Born: 24 March 1943 (age 83); Mol, Belgium
- Known for: HUMO; Alles Kan Beter

Guy Mortier (born 24 March 1943) is a Flemish journalist and radio and television personality. He is known as former chief editor of magazine HUMO for over thirty years (1969–2003). Apart from editing articles, he also wrote pun-based headlines for them and occasionally wrote columns and reviews of rock records.

Early in his career, he hosted his own rock music radio show Schudden Voor Gebruik. He was also jury member in the satirical comedy radio programs De taalstrijd and De Perschefs.

He is also known as panel member in the television show Alles Kan Beter which first aired in December 1997.

In 2014, he received the Vlaamse Cultuurprijs voor Algemene Culturele Verdienste, a prize for contributions to the culture of Flanders.
