= Neveneffecten =

Flemish comedy show

- Neveneffecten series poster
- Genre: Sketch show, Mockumentary, Satire, Tragicomedy
- Created by: Neveneffecten
- Directed by: Bart De Pauw, Jan Eelen, Kenneth Taylor, Luc Lemaitre
- Country of origin: Belgium
- Original language: Dutch
- No. of series: 2
- No. of episodes: 13

Production
- Running time: 60 minutes
- Production company: Woestijnvis

Original release
- Network: VRT Canvas
- Release: 2005 – 2009

Neveneffecten is a TV-program on Flemish public television, written and performed by the cabaret quartet of the same name.
It is a mockumentary series that contains a lot of absurd humor, inspired by the National Geographic documentaries.
Famous directors of the show are Bart De Pauw and Jan Eelen.

== Cast ==
- Jonas Geirnaert
- Lieven Scheire
- Koen De Poorter
- Jelle De Beule

== Episodes ==
=== Season 1 (2005) ===
1. Het leven van de Kommomaan (The life of the Kommomaan)
2. De bron van de E40 (The source of the E40)
3. Dieren des doods (Animals of death)
4. Van pool tot evenaar (From pole to equator)
5. Shopping center
6. Het geheim van de Graal (The secret of the Grail)
7. ITCH
8. De Gebroeders Tupolev (The Tupolev Brothers)

=== Season 2 (2008) ===
1. Schatten uit de diepte (Sea Treasures)
2. Sint Inc. - $interklaa$, de waarheid over 6/12 (Sint Inc. - $aint Nicola$, the truth about 6/12)
3. De landing (The invasion)
4. Armageddon
5. The making of
