= Sint-Lodewijkscollege (Lokeren) =

Coordinates: 51.10305°N 3.9922°E

The Sint-Lodewijkscollege is a Catholic high school (subsidized free school) in the centre of Lokeren, Belgium.

== History ==
The historic baroque building was built in 1714 for the family Van Kersschaever. The facade is a classified heritage site and protected monument. The actual school was established in 1850 by the bishop of Ghent, Louis-Joseph Delebecque.

In earlier times, there was also elementary education and a Boarding school, which closed in 1971. In 1969, it was one of the first schools which abolished single-sex education in Flanders. Since the 1990s, the number of students remained stable around 1000.

== Education ==
Students follow three cycles during 6 years of education. The school offers only ASO-education, which is a normal type of education that prepares the students for higher education and university. Subjects include Math, Science, Human science, Classical languages, Modern languages and Economics. The school educates its students from a Catholic point of view.

School principals (Dutch directeur):

- Principal: Caroline De Ridder

== Trivia ==
- Graduating students give a yearly benefit-performance, Avond van de Zesdes.

== Notable students ==
- Anne Van Lancker
- Lieven Scheire
- Jonas Geirnaert
- Linde Merckpoel
- Chris Van den Durpel
- Bram Willems
- Stijn Vlaminck
