= Jonas Geirnaert =

Belgian animator and film director

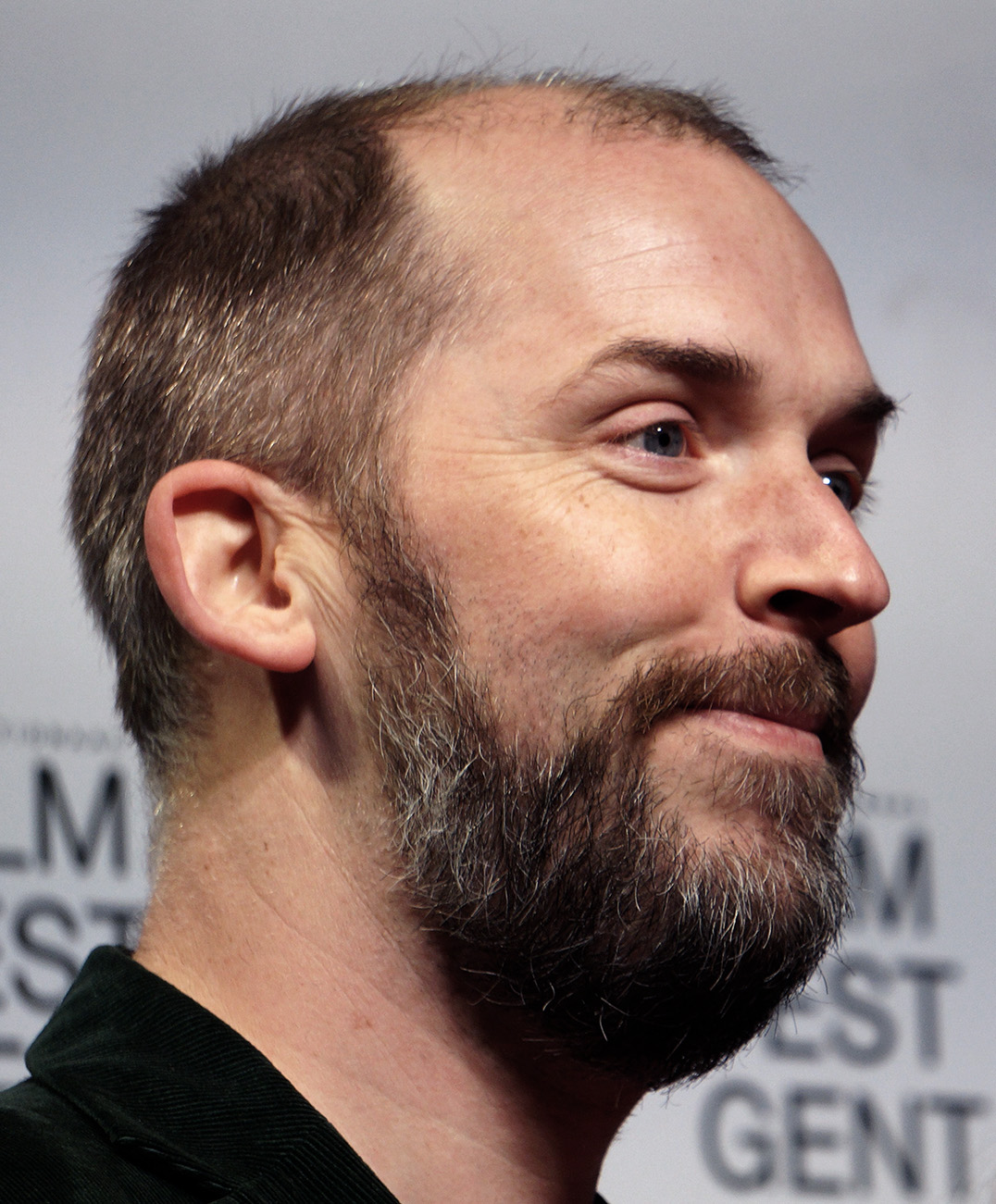
- Geirnaert in 2021
- Born: 28 July 1982 (age 43); Wachtebeke, Belgium
- Occupations: Animator, comics artist, actor, comedian

Jonas Geirnaert (born 28 July 1982) is a Belgian animator. He studied animation at the KASK in Ghent. In May 2004, he won the Short Film Jury Prize at the Cannes Film Festival with his animated short Flatlife (11 min). The first minute of the film was the only portion with sound because it was a student project that was unfinished at the time of the selection entry deadline.

Although Flatlife has no political message, Jonas' previous movie, The All-American Alphabet, clearly has one. On stage in Cannes, Jonas had a message for all Americans: "Don't vote Bush". While such statements were popular at the time, Geirnaert's political leanings were far-left, as he was a member of the marxist Workers Party of Belgium.

In the fall of 2005, Geirnaert made the TV comedy series Neveneffecten for Canvas (public Flemish television) with his fellow comedians Lieven Scheire, Koen De Poorter and Jelle De Beule. In 2011, this same group of four made the television show BASTA which also offered satirical critique on current cultural phenomenon, like help desks, uncritical journalism, television call games, the production of meat and internet scammers. Through their actions, some of the more fraudulent abuses have been put to a stop, e.g. the de facto illegal television calling games have been banned from television in Flanders.

== Filmography ==
- Basta (2011)
- Kabouter Wesley (2009)
- Willy's en marjetten (2006)
- Neveneffecten (2005)
- Flatlife (2004)
- The All-American Alphabet (2002)
