= Anne Van Lancker =

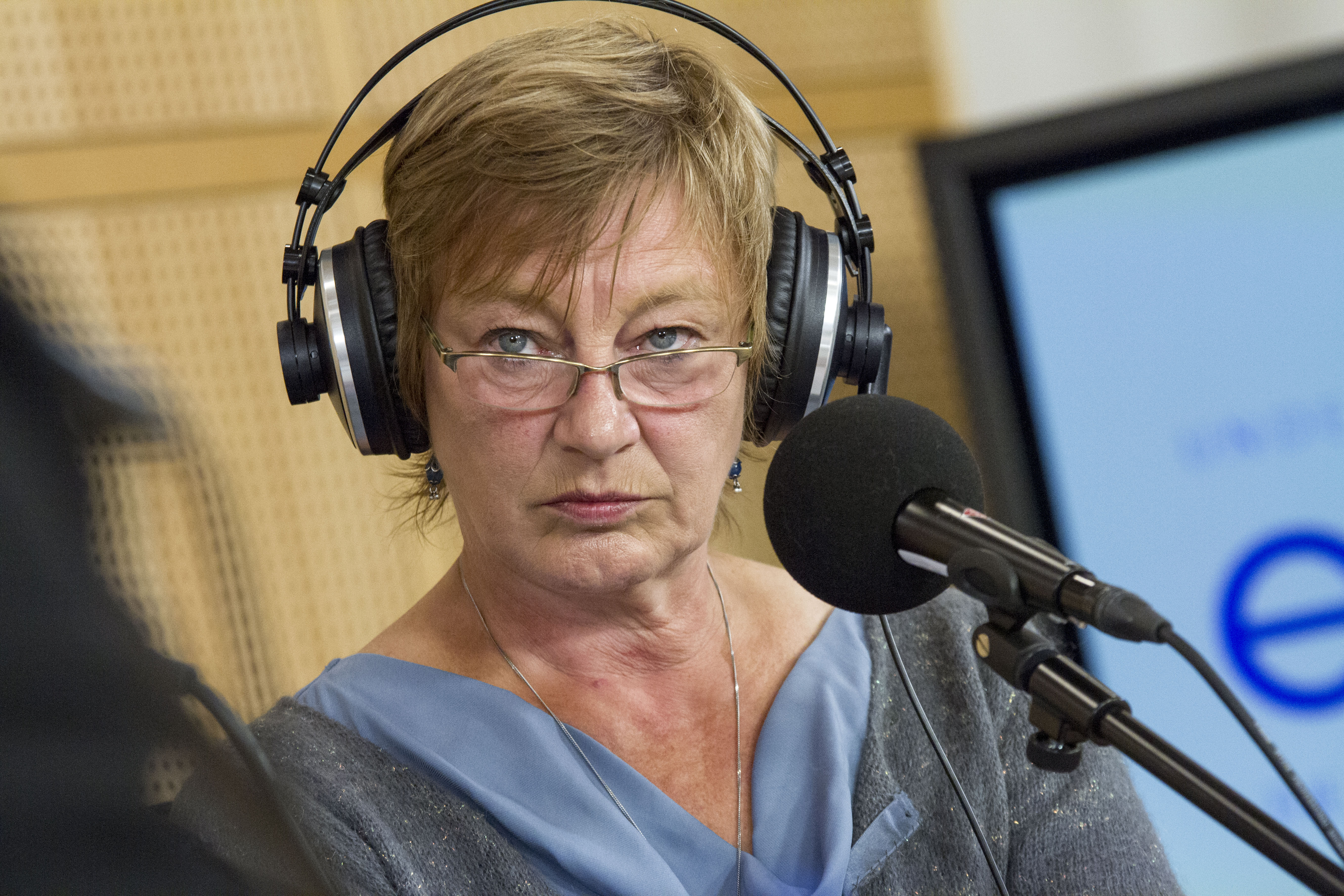
- Born: Anne Edward Marie Van Lancker; 4 March 1954 (age 71); Temse, Belgium
- Occupation: politician

Anne Edward Marie Van Lancker (born 4 March 1954) is a Belgian politician and a former Member of the European Parliament (until 2009) for Belgium with the Socialistische Partij Anders (sp.a), part of the Socialist Group and sat on the European Parliament's Committee on Employment and Social Affairs and its Committee on Women's Rights and Gender Equality.

She was a substitute for the Committee on Development and a member of the Delegation to the ACP-EU Joint Parliamentary Assembly.

Anne Van Lancker was the only Belgian MEP in the European Convention, that presented a draft constitution for the EU in 2003. Her work during that convention earned her the title 'tireless battler for a social Europe' from Financial Times journalist Peter Norman.

She also chairs zij-kant, the women's organisation of sp.a.

== Education ==
- She followed secondary education at the Sint-Lodewijkscollege in Lokeren.
- 1978: Degree in sociology (sociology of work)
- 1988: Postgraduate degree in social legislation

== Career ==
- 1978-1979: Academic researcher, HIVA (Institute for Labour Studies)
- 1979-1984: Assistant at the faculty of work sociology, Catholic University of Leuven
- 1984-1988: Member of staff of research department at SEVI (Emile Vandervelde Institute Research and Documentation Centre)
- 1988-1989: Assistant, parliamentary SP group
- 1989-1990: Deputy head, office of the Flemish Minister of Employment
- 1990-1992: Head of office of the Flemish Minister of Employment
- 1992-1994: Head of private office to the Flemish Minister of Employment and Social Affairs
- since 1994: Member of the SP.A party bureau
- since 1999: Member of the SP.A executive
- since 1995: Member of party council, Ghent
- Member of the East Flanders provincial executive
- since 1999: Chairwoman of Zijkant
- since 1994: Member of the European Parliament

== See also ==
- 2004 European Parliament election in Belgium
