= Alles Kan Beter =

- Genre: Sketch show, Satire,
- Created by: Jan Eelen
- Directed by: Jan Eelen
- Country of origin: Belgium
- Original language: Dutch
- No. of seasons: 2

Production
- Producer: Woestijnvis
- Running time: 30 minutes
- Production company: Woestijnvis

Original release
- Network: VRT
- Release: December 5, 1997 – February 26, 1999

Alles Kan Beter (Everything Can Be Better) was a Belgian comedy TV series produced by Flemish production house Woestijnvis between the end of 1997 and 1999. It was broadcast on the public TV channel Canvas, directed by Jan Eelen and starred TV presenter Mark Uytterhoeven, chief editor of HUMO Guy Mortier and the newcomer on television at that time Rob Vanoudenhoven as regular hosts. The fourth presenter was a different guest every week. The program was a combination of humoristic commentary on archive footage taped from the Flemish TV channels VRT and its rival vtm and sketches starring the four hosts. The show achieved cult status and is still repeated regularly.

== Concept ==
Mark Uytterhoeven already enjoyed high popularity with TV audiences thanks to his humoristic presentation during the FIFA World Cup coverage in 1990 and 1994 and programs like Het Huis van Wantrouwen (1991-1992) and Morgen Maandag (1993), which all achieved high ratings. The programs were notable for his use of sketches and playful use of pre-recorded video footage. Alles Kan Beter had a similar set-up, but aimed at a smaller audience. The show presented footage taped from the TV channels VRT and VTM, usually from news reports, but talk shows or advertisements weren't uncommon either. The footage often focused on lapsus, language errors, verbal tics, new media trends, odd mono- and dialogues or unintentionally funny moments. Uytterhoeven provided ironic commentary to this footage and sometimes he and his co-host, tried to surpass it, either in the studio itself or in pre-recorded sketch films. Their studio sketches often spoofed the verbal style of the footage they had shown before, complete with word play, while the sketch films were more visual parodies.

The production was very intense. Uytterhoeven had three video recorders running at home to make sure he wouldn't miss any suitable material. Many lines were scripted beforehand, but there was also room for improvisation since Uytterhoeven didn't want to rehearse anything, nor inform his co-hosts beforehand of what they were about to see or do. He only left them with vague instructions, which they could prepare at home. Each episode was recorded Thursday evening, one day before the actual broadcast.

== Impact ==
Alles Kan Beter was a cult show from the start. Guy Mortier, who was mostly a famous face to readers of his own magazine Humo and people who'd listened to the 1980s radio show De Taalstrijd became more well known with the general public. Rob Vanoudenhoven had only appeared on television before in some sketches of the game show De Drie Wijzen and was thus a complete nobody to most viewers. He addressed this by introducing himself in the pilot episode as I'm the man of whom half Flanders now wonders: "Who the fuck is Vanoudenhoven?". He gained such popularity with audiences that he received his own TV show a year later, De XII Werken van Vanoudenhoven (1998-1999), which managed to become a colossal ratings hit. By the time the second season of Alles Kan Beter aired Vanoudenhoven was a huge media star, which irked Uytterhoeven somewhat since it destroyed his original intention of introducing an unknown face in the show. Some of the guest hosts also gained more fame with TV audiences by appearing in the program.

Alles Kan Beter won Humo's Prijs van de Kijker (1999), the Prijs van de Radio- en Televisiekritiek for Best TV Show (1999) and the HA! van Humo (1999). After two seasons Uytterhoeven felt they had done enough with the concept. The production process had been so intense that he specifically stated no third season would ever be made. Yet there have been some one-off specials in the decades beyond, including during Humo's Pop Poll Night in 1999 and the 50th anniversary of the Flemish public channel in 2002. In the fall of 2001 Uytterhoeven and Vanoudenhoven also hosted the humoristic talk show Alles Komt Terug, which also combined amusing archive footage with parody sketches. Between 2003 and 2005, when Uytterhoeven was host of De Laatste Show, he also had a weekly segment with Guy Mortier called Gefressenes Funden, where they gave ironic commentary to footage recorded on TV earlier that week.

Alles Kan Beter has never received an official DVD release, since so much of the footage parodied in the show was taken from rival TV channel VTM, which would lead to copyright issues. In the fall of 2008 a one-off DVD was released as a gift with the magazine Humo, compiling the best and most popular moments. Many episodes can also be watched on YouTube, albeit illegally. And they are still rebroadcast regularly on both Canvas and also on its sister channel één.

== Guest hosts ==
- Warre Borgmans .... Himself
- Stany Crets .... Himself
- Jan De Smet .... Himself
- Martin Heylen .... Himself
- Carl Huybrechts .... Himself
- Wim Opbrouck .... Himself
- Barbara Sarafian .... Herself
- Dirk Sterckx .... Himself
- Dirk Tieleman .... Himself
- Adriaan Van den Hoof .... Himself
- Tania Van der Sanden .... Herself
- Tom Van Dyck .... Himself
- Frieda Van Wijck .... Herself
