= Woestijnvis =

Belgian production company

- Company type: Television production company
- Industry: Television · Film
- Founded: 1997
- Founders: Wouter Vandenhaute; Jan Huyse; Erik Watté
- Headquarters: Vilvoorde, Belgium
- Key people: Wouter Vandenhaute; Jan Huyse; Mark Uytterhoeven
- Products: Television programmes, films, documentaries
- Owner: Telenet
- Website: woestijnvis.be

Woestijnvis (literally: Desert Fish) is an independent Flemish television production company based in Vilvoorde, Belgium.

== History ==
The name of the company refers to a famous mistake of a quiz-candidate in the Flemish version of Wheel of Fortune: the remaining letters were W . . ST . . NV . S and the participant answered "WOESTIJNVIS" (Desert Fish), the correct answer was "WOESTIJNVOS" (Desert Fox). The company was founded in 1997 by Jan Huyse, Wouter Vandenhaute and Erik Watté in close collaboration with Mark Uytterhoeven. The company rose to fame with its series The Mole, variants of which were recorded and broadcast in various countries.

Woestijnvis is now part of the holding De Vijver Media which owns the Belgian TV-stations VIER and VIJF.

== Programmes ==
- Man bijt hond (1997 - 2013)
- De Commissie Wyndaele (1997 - 1998)
- Alles Kan Beter (1997 - 1999)
- De XII werken van Vanoudenhoven (1998 - 1999)
- De Mol (1998 - ongoing)
- Wijlen De Week (1999)
- De laatste show (1999 - 2012)
- In de gloria (2000 - 2001)
- Euro 2000 (2000)
- De quizmaster (2000)
- Napels Zien (2000)
- Mannen op de Rand van een Zenuwinzinking (2001)
- Alles komt terug (2001)
- De Blijde Boodschap (2002)
- Bal Mondial (2002 - 2002)
- Via Vanoudenhoven (2002)
- De fiets van Pavlov (2002)
- De Pappenheimers (2003 - ongoing)
- De Slimste Mens ter Wereld (2003 - ongoing)
- Het Rob-Rapport (2004)
- Het Eiland (2004 - 2005)
- Het Geslacht De Pauw (2004 - 2005)
- Vive le Tour (2005)
- Neveneffecten (2005)
- De Believers (2006)
- De Parelvissers (2006)
- De moeder van mijn dochter (2006)
- Alles Uit De Kast (2006)
- Willy's en Marjetten (2006)
- Nooitgedacht (2006 - 2009)
- 0032 (2007)
- Terug naar Siberië (2006 - 2007)
- Belga Sport (2007 - 2013)
- Het programma van Wim Helsen (2008)
- Ladies First (2008)
- Van Vlees en Bloed (2009)
- Voor eens & voor altijd (2009)
- De jaren stillekes (2009 - 2010)
- Een simpel plan (2009)
- Meneer Doktoor (2009)
- Leuven Hulp (2009)
- De school van Lukaku (2010)
- God en klein Pierke (2010 - 2012)
- In Godsnaam (2010 - 2012)
- Basta (2011)
- De Ronde (2011)
- De Rechtbank (2011 - ongoing)
- Scheire en de schepping (2012 - 2014)
- De Kruitfabriek (2012 - 2013)
- Goe Gebakken (2012 - 2013)
- De Bende Haemers (2012)
- Dr. Livingstone (2012)
- Met man en macht (2013)
- De Bleekweide (2013)
- De Slimste Gemeente (2013 - 2014)
- Rasters (2013)
- Spelen met uw Leven1 (2013)
- De moestuin volgens Wim (2013)
- Geubels en de Belgen (2013)
- De Ideale Wereld (2013 - ongoing)
- Kristel gaat vreemd (2013)
- Los Easy Riders (2013 - 2014)
- Heylen en de Herkomst (2014 - 2015)
- Topdokters (2014 - ongoing)
- Het beste moet nog komen (2014)
- De Recherche (2014 - ongoing)
- Bloot en Speren (2014 - 2015)
- Achter de rug (2015 - ongoing)
- Geubels en de Idioten (2015 - ongoing)
- De Blauwe Gids (2015)
- 't Is gebeurd (2016 - ingoing)
- De Bril van Martin (2016)
- Glammertime (2016)
- Callboys (2016)
- De dag (2018)
- De Campus Cup (2019)
- Container Cup (2020)
- Amai zeg wauw! (2023)
- Bompa Bockie (2024)
- Kamp Jeroom (2025)
