= Lindsay Nikole =

American zoologist and science communicator

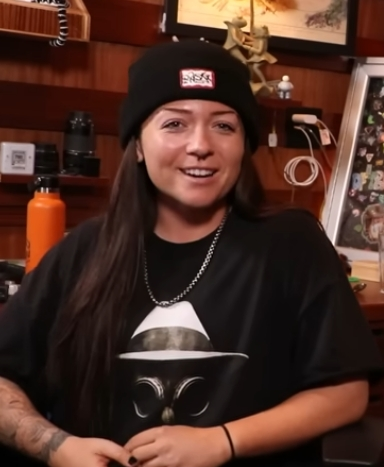
- Nikole in 2024
- Education: Oregon State University
- Occupations: TikToker; YouTuber
- Years active: 2020–present (Note: Though she created her YouTube account in 2014, Nikole began her online content creation career in 2020 on TikTok and Instagram. She began posting on YouTube in 2022.)

Instagram information
- Page: lindsay nikole
- Followers: 838K

TikTok information
- Page: lindsay nikole
- Followers: 2.7 million

YouTube information
- Channel: Lindsay Nikole
- Genres: Education; Zoology
- Subscribers: 2 million
- Views: 573.9 million
- Last updated: June 5, 2026

Lindsay Nikole is an American zoologist, science communicator, TikToker, and YouTuber. Her online content focuses on topics such as zoology, prehistory, and evolutionary biology.

== Zoology content career ==
Nikole's career in zoology content creation was spurred by her obsession with lions, while she was a high school student. In her senior year, she volunteered at a big cat sanctuary in South Africa, further propelling her interest in animals.

Nikole later attended Oregon State University (OSU). In her third year at OSU, she interned at the Cheetah Conservation Fund (CCF) in Namibia. She intended to move to Africa to work with wild animals but the COVID-19 pandemic disrupted her plans. As a result, she began making zoology-related content on TikTok after graduating from OSU in 2020. Her videos focus on topics of prehistory and evolution. Nikole's career has also led her to travel to Kenya to work with the Save the Elephants organization. Her videos discussing various animals, particularly on TikTok, have been noted by media outlets.

After not posting her first YouTube video because it was "super boring", she waited a few months before attempting to make another. She reached out to fellow content creator Miniminuteman, whose editor in Argentina was looking for new clients, and the two began working together. By August 2023, her TikTok and YouTube accounts had surpassed 2.5 million and 1.1 million followers, respectively. At VidCon 2024, Nikole was a guest speaker at two panels: "Breaking Boundaries: Amplifying LGBTQ+ Voices" and "Live, Laugh, Learn: Educating the Internet". VidCon's co-founder Hank Green has referenced Nikole as a content creator he admires, and in November 2024, Nikole appeared alongside Green in one of his Vlogbrothers videos. Nikole has also collaborated with paleontologist Danielle Dufault of Animalogic, as well as Panthera Cats, to produce a video about the evolutionary history of cats.

The growth of her channel led to her videos transitioning from a small DIY crew production, to being worked on by a team of six researchers and two science writers. Tattoos are a signature characteristic of Nikole's visual aesthetic and in 2025, she launched Extinked, a docuseries focusing on extinct animals which Nikole has tattoos of on her body. Her production team traveled to Portland, Oregon, where filming for the series took place at Shokunin Tattoo. There Nikole had artwork completed on her by her friend and Ink Master alum Angel Rose.

In November 2025, she released the book Epic Earth: A Wild Ride Through the History of Life on Our Planet, a non-fiction book about the history of life on Earth. The book was based on her video series, The History of Life. In January 2026, Nikole interviewed Will Smith shortly prior to the debut of his National Geographic series Pole to Pole.

== Other projects ==
Based in Los Angeles, Nikole is also a musician and began playing guitar when she was eight. She released a four-track EP in 2020.
