= Hetty Helsmoortel =

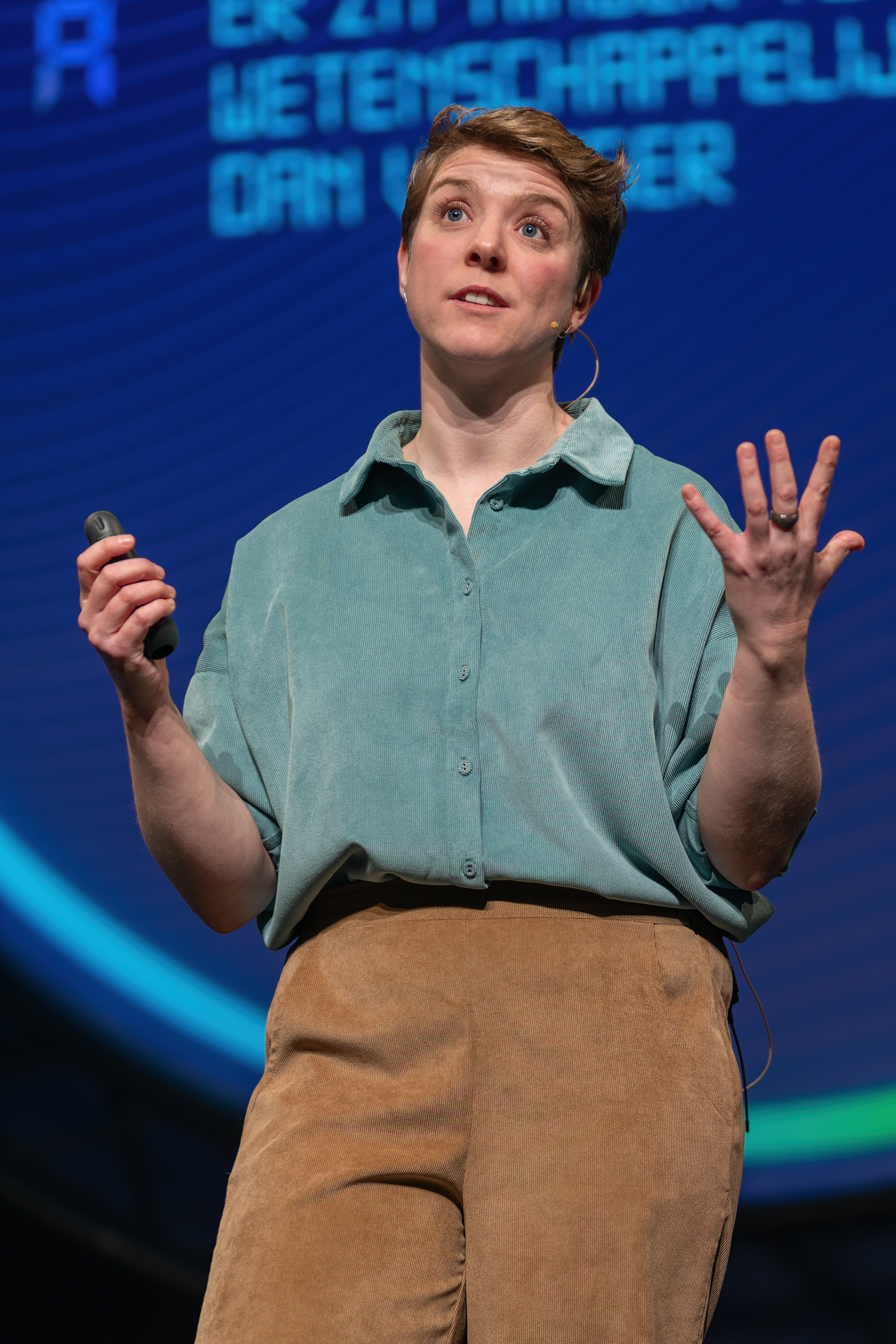
Hetty Helsmoortel

Hetty Hilde Helsmoortel (born 6 June 1986, Oostend) is a Belgian scientist, author and organizer of the science festival Nerdland Festival (initially called Sound of Science). With a PhD in health sciences, she spent eight years as a cancer researcher at Ghent University. Beyond her research, she studied drama at the Royal Institute for Theatre, Cinema, and Sound in Brussels, which has enabled her to blend scientific insight with engaging storytelling effectively.

She provides insights into science news in the media, such as for VRT NWS. She is also a regular columnist for EOS Science. In 2015 and 2016, she served as the in-house scientist on the television program De Afspraak. In 2020, Hetty authored the book De Geknipte Genen - How CRISPR Will Rewrite Our Future and Why Everyone Should Know. She also tours across Flanders with an interactive presentation based on the book.

== Festivals ==
From 2018 to 2021, Hetty organized the annual science festival, Sound of Science, in collaboration with Toon Verlinden.

In 2022, Hetty and Lieven Scheire launched the first popular science Nerdland Festival at the Puyenbroeck domain, where she served as an organizer. In May 2023, the second Nerdland Festival, which spanned three days, attracted over 20,000 visitors. In 2022 and 2023, she also helped organize Nerdland for Little Nerds, a family festival aimed at children aged eight and older, held at the Lotto Arena.

== Bibliography ==
- De Geknipte Genen (January 2020)
- Het eerste Nerdland Doeboek voor Kleine Nerds (June 2020)
- Doeboek voor kleine nerds 2 (November 2020)
- Doeboek voor kleine nerds 3 (co-authored, June 2021)
- Doeboek voor kleine nerds 4 (co-authored, May 2022)
- Dino's (children's book with Lieven Scheire, November 2022)
- Contributions to the Nerdland Scheurkalender 2022, 2023 en 2024
- Ruimtevaart (or children, co-authored, November 2022)
- Chemie (June 2023)

== Podcasts ==
- Hetty is a co-host of the Nerdland Maandoverzicht podcast, a popular Belgian science podcast hosted by Lieven Scheire, Jeroen Baert en Bart van Peer, where she breaks down complex science and technology topics for a general audience. With her expertise in health sciences and skills in communication, she ensures the content is accurate and engaging, making significant contributions to the podcast's success in educating and entertaining its listeners.

== Shows ==
- Missie 2021
- Missie 2022
- Nerdland Voor Kleine Nerds met Lieven Scheire (2022, 2023)
- Missie 2023
- Missie 2024
- Missie 2025
