= Danielle Dufault =

Canadian paleoartist

- Born: 1988 or 1989 (age 37–38)
- Education: Sheridan College
- Occupations: Paleoartist and biological illustrator
- Known for: Paleoart, biological illustration, Animalogic (YouTube channel)
- Website: www.ddufault.com

Danielle Dufault (born 1988 or 1989) is a Canadian paleoartist and biological illustrator based in Toronto, Ontario.

She is the in-house paleontological illustrator with the Royal Ontario Museum (ROM). She is also the illustrator and main host of the zoological YouTube channel Animalogic.

== Career ==
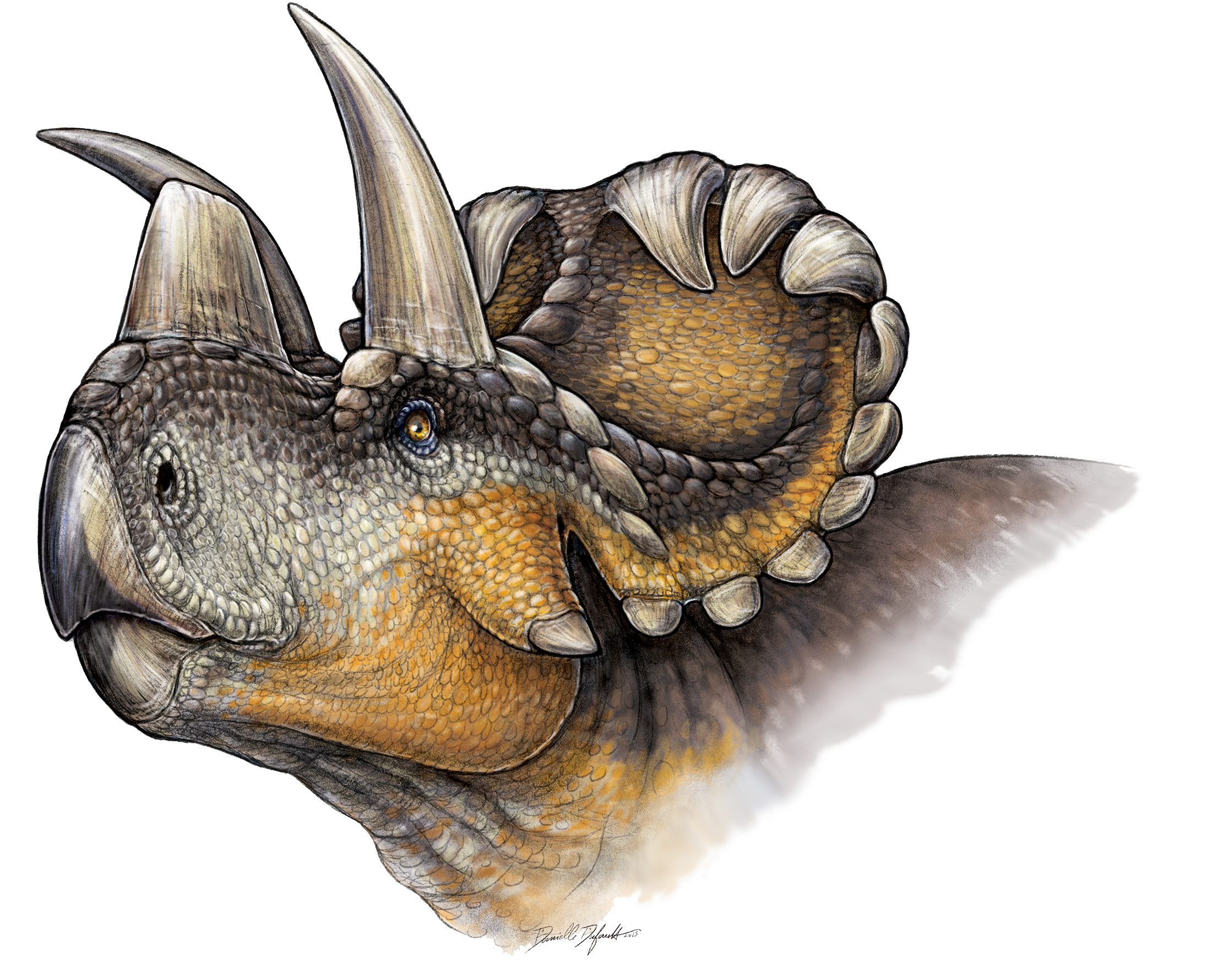
Wendiceratops by Danielle Dufault

=== Paleontological illustration ===
Dufault's interest in paleoart started when she visited Royal Ontario Museum in Toronto at eight years old and saw the dinosaur skeletons on display. In addition to drawing and sketching, she enjoyed exploring nature as a child, spending hours outdoors, digging up worms and collecting insects. She also read books on paleontology and had an interest in scientific news.

Dufault enrolled in the Technical and Scientific Illustration degree program at Sheridan College in the Greater Toronto Area and during her third year she was awarded a co-op placement at the ROM. After graduating with a degree in 2012, she did some contract work for the ROM, eventually finding full time employment. She is now the in-house paleontological illustrator for the ROM and works closely with the researchers in the ROM's Evans lab.

Dufault uses both traditional and digital resources to create art and scientific diagrams. Dufault's process involves consulting with paleontologists about the subject to be illustrated. She then gathers information about what is known about the subject's habitat; what other creatures from the same area looked like; and how the subject's role as a predator or prey might have affected the patterns and coloration of their exteriors. She also examines fossils and consults other sketches and technical drawings.

Her work has been published in many scientific journals and is used to illustrate newly named dinosaur genera and species. Some of her work includes illustrating the Wendiceratops and the Zaraapelta nomadis, two newly-discovered dinosaurs. She illustrated the a 500-million-year-old worm-like creature called the Ovatiovermis cribratus for Assisting Associate Professor Jean-Bernard Caron of the University of Toronto. She assisted University of Toronto undergrad Joseph Moysiuk in creating an animation of a paleozoic marine creature known as a hyolith, which evolved more than 530 million years ago.

=== Animalogic ===
Since its inception in 2014, Dufault has served as host of the zoological YouTube series Animalogic. In 2026, she collaborated with zoology YouTuber Lindsay Nikole on an Animalogic video about the evolutionary history of cats.
