= Anne-Sophie Dielen =

Science communicator

Anne-Sophie Dielen is a researcher, scientist communicator and policy maker. Her research focuses on generating and regulating sodium/proton antiporters in plant chloroplasts. She is the Founder of The League of Remarkable Women in Science.

== Career ==
Dielen has a bachelor's degree from the Academy of Montpellier. After completing a PhD in Plant Biology and Biochemistry from the Bordeaux II University in France, Dielen then became a postdoctoral fellow at The Australian National University (ANU) as part of its Realizing Increased Photosynthetic Efficiency research project.

The League of Remarkable Women that she founded, is an interview project featuring women in STEM. It aims at profiling role models for the next generation of female scientists and was first supported by a 2014 ANU Gender Institute grants.

She then became the director of crop biotechnology policy at CropLife Australia.
