= Man bijt hond =

- Man Bijt Hond series banner
- Genre: Newsmagazine, comedy
- Created by: Wouter Vanderhoute
- Voices of: Flemish version: Geert Seegers (1997-2013) Dutch version: Michael Abspoel (1999-2015, 2019-present) Maxim Hartman (relief, 2009-2015) Johan Derksen (relief, 2019-present)
- Country of origin: Belgium; Netherlands
- Original languages: Flemish; Dutch
- No. of seasons: Belgium: 16 Netherlands: 17

Production
- Production companies: Woestijnvis (Flemish version) NCRV (Dutch version, 1999-2014) KRO-NCRV (Dutch version, 2014-2015) Fabiola (Dutch version, 2019-present)

Original release
- Network: Flemish version: Eén (1997-2012) VIER (2012-2013) Dutch version: NPO 1 (1999-2006) NPO 2 (2006-2015) SBS6 (2019-present)

Man bijt hond (Dutch: Man bites dog) is a long-running Flemish TV programme inspired by Strip-Tease, the show that lays you bare, a 1985 TV programme that ran on RTBF. The show aired in Flanders and the Netherlands, with separate versions for each country. The Flemish version aired from 1997 to 2013, whilst the Netherlands version originally aired from 1999 to 2015, with a revival airing since 2019.

The Flemish version, produced by Woestijnvis, aired for most of its run on Eén, before moving to VIER for its final year. The Netherlands version was produced under license by the NCRV (KRO-NCRV for the final year of its original run) and aired on NPO 1 until 2006, when it moved to NPO 2. The 2019 revival is produced, under license, by independent producer Fabiola and broadcast on SBS6.

== Format ==
The show has a newsmagazine-style format with a large focus on human interest stories, voxpops and satirical sketches, with an often humorous and positive approach to presentation. At its peak, the Flemish version aired after the main edition of Het Journaal, VRT's daily news broadcast. It lacked an on-vision presenter, with comedian Geert Segers (Flemish version) or Michael Abspoel (Dutch version) providing commentary and linking between segments.

Some of the Flemish version's most popular segments included the daily Babbelbox feature, similar to the Canadian show Speakers' Corner, in which bypassers could record segments on a variety of topics in the form of rants, big-ups, shoutouts, jokes, music performances, among others. Other popular segments were more satirical, like the popular Vaneigens, a satirical sketch which aired at the end of each show, featuring a discussion that worked towards one particular joke about the day's top headline. Although its original run was short-lived (only running through the show's first year), the segment's popularity caused its revival during the Flemish version's final year.

The Netherlands version of the show is slightly more ironic than the original Flemish version, however, the show still had a positive approach, due to its producer's (NCRV) Christian-based values. It also adapted most of the original version's features, some of them, like the Babbelbox, outright, and some of them heavily adapted to reflect the customs of the Dutch audience (e.g. the Vaneigens sketch was modified into Ons kent Ons, with more characters and a more elaborate setting based on a supermarket, as opposed to the minimalist approach of the original version).

== History ==
The show was created by Wouter Vandenhaute, the founder of the Woestijnvis production company, alongside company partners Jan Huyse and Erik Watté, and its main producer Bruno Wyndaele, which was behind the show's main concept. The company's first ever show, it eventually became one of the producer's top formats, alongside reality show format The Mole, sold to over 30 countries. The first edition of the original Flemish version went on the air on 1 September 1997, as part of a massive reorganization of the programming concept of Eén (then named TV1). The show soon benefitted of the audiences of the main edition of Het Journaal, at its peak, having between 800 and 900,000 viewers, quickly evolving into one of the channel's top shows. The viewers particularly appreciated the show's concept, that put the everyday activities of the ordinary Flemish populace in the spotlight.

The show's format caught the attention of the NCRV, one of the members of the Dutch public broadcasting system, who bought the show's format and adapted it to a Dutch audience, under the supervision of Marcel Sleeuwenhoek. The first edition was broadcast on 30 August 1999 on NPO 1, where it was broadcast until 2006, when the massive reorganization of the public broadcasting system caused the show to move to NPO 2. The show became as influential as the Flemish version, and it also managed to produce extremely high ratings.

Both versions of the show have also won accolades. In 2001 the Flemish version of the program won a Premio Ondas, the most prestigious Spanish media award, in the international TV category, and, in 2007, the HA! Award from the Humo magazine. On October 21, 2011, the Dutch Man bijt hond won the prize at the Gouden Televizier-Ring Gala, the most prestigious national TV award, as the most iconic television program in the 60 years of Dutch television history. This resulted in the symbolical renaming of the KPN transmitting tower in Hilversum after the show.

In 2011, Woestijnvis' parent company bought the Flemish assets of ProSiebenSat.1 Media, including VT4, which would be renamed as VIER after the takeover. Shortly after the transaction was completed, the VRT announced, in the end of April, that both Woestijnvis and the public broadcaster had agreed to part ways, and that Man bijt hond would disappear from Eén at the end of the 2011-2012 TV season, moving to the newly renamed TV channel. The first show on VIER aired on September 20, 2012.

The show's defection to VIER caused some changes to the show's format. It was now being broadcast weekly, every Thursday evening, and the show now ran for an hour (as opposed to a half-hour on Eén). The show also began focusing on longer-form content. The new format and its later timeslot was not well received by viewers, causing a massive ratings decline. Producers reacted by reintroducing the popular Vaneigens segment and moving the show to an earlier timeslot, but still ratings were lower compared to its earlier tenure on Eén. As a result, the Flemish version of the show was promptly canceled, with its final edition airing on January 21, 2013.

The Dutch version survived for longer, but the merger with the KRO-NCRV ultimately caused the cancellation of the show due to a lack of funding. The final edition of the Dutch version aired on October 2, 2015. The show's producing team was retained for a short-lived show for NPO 3, Jan rijdt rond, hosted by Jan Volgt and with a similar focus, but skewed to a younger audience.

In 2019, independent producer Fabiola (partly owned by Woestijnvis) and SBS6 teamed up for a revived version of the show, initially with a daily format every evening at 19:30, after the evening block of Hart van Nederland and Shownieuws. Most of the show's team, including announcer Michael Abspoel, returned. Although the show received decent ratings for the broadcaster in a heavily competitive timeslot (competing against the very popular De Wereld Draait Door on NPO 1 and the evening RTL Nieuws on RTL 4, both airing at the same time), and even increasing SBS6's ratings on the timeslot, the show was temporarily put on hiatus during the COVID-19 pandemic. When the show came back in May, the daily format was replaced, initially as a temporary measure, by a weekly programme under the name Man bijt hond XL, in a later timeslot of 21:30. Due to financial circumstances caused by the pandemic, the daily format was officially scrapped in mid-July, and the weekly Man bijt hond XL format was made permanent; when it came back for the autumn season, it was moved into an earlier timeslot, where it remains until today.
