= Lieven Scheire =

Belgian comedian

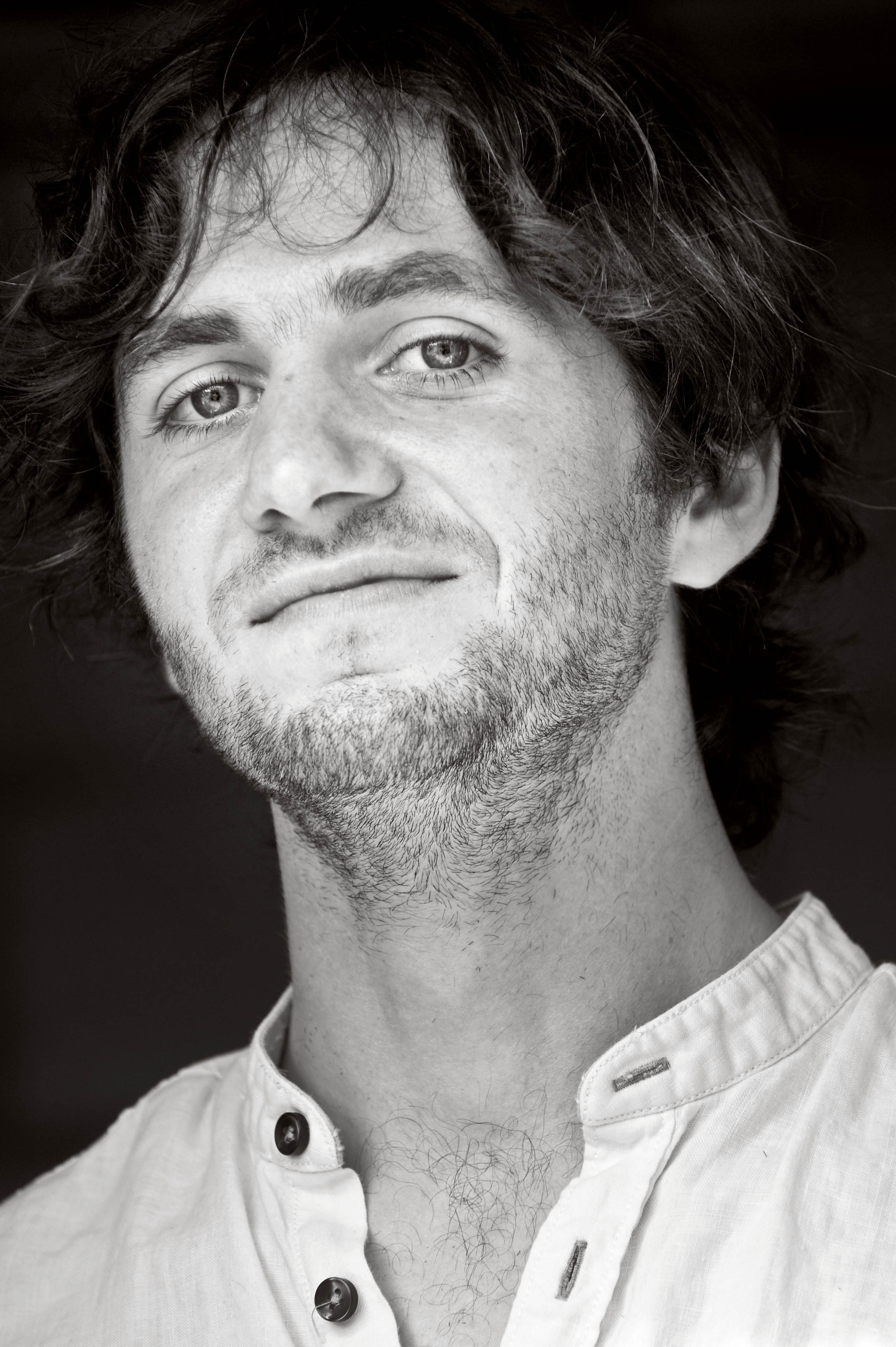
- Born: 3 May 1981 (age 44); Wachtebeke, Belgium
- Occupations: Comedian, presenter, science communicator
- Known for: Neveneffecten

Lieven Scheire (born 3 May 1981) is a Belgian comedian, presenter and science communicator.

== Career ==
Scheire attended secondary school at the Sint-Lodewijkscollege in Lokeren; he then began a physics degree at Ghent University, but dropped out to become a stand-up comedian. He won the Lunatic Stand-up Comedy Award in 2002. Scheire also did a year long stint as an exchange student in Reykjavík, Iceland where he attended Fjölbrautarskólinn í Breiðholti

Neveneffecten (a cabaret quartet founded by him and his cousin Jonas Geirnaert) won the jury prize at the Groninger Studenten Cabaret Festival in 2003. They have toured Flanders and The Netherlands with their comedy theatre show and made various sketch shows for Flemish television.

Scheire has become well known among the Flemish public for his work in science communication. He has hosted several science shows, the podcast 'Nerdland Podcast' and is a co-organiser of the Nerdland Festival together with Hetty Helsmoortel.

== Television ==
- Het Geslacht De Pauw (2005)
- Neveneffecten (2005)
- Willy's en Marjetten (2006)
- De laatste show (Eén) (2007)
- Basta (2011)
- Scheire en de schepping (2012)
- De Schuur van Scheire (2015)
- De allesweter (2015)
- Superbrein (2016)
- Team Scheire (2018)
- Kan iedereen nog volgen? (2019)
- Code van Coppens (2019)
- Ons DNA (2022)
