= Colour whist =

Colour whist (whist à la couleur or whist belge in French or Kleurenwiezen in Dutch) is a Belgian variation to the card game whist.

In contrast to the normal game of whist, the trump colour is determined by a bidding process rather than being the last card on the stack. The trump is determined during a first phase in the game. A player "asks" for a colour, and the next players can pass, join him, ask another colour or ask another game. The colours have a hierarchy: hearts is the most valuable, followed by diamonds, followed by clubs and the spades are the least valuable.

When multiple colours are in the running for the trump, a bidding process determines which one will become the trump. The colour worth the least must always bid one trick higher. The amount to which had been bid is the minimum number of tricks they must win to win the game. The number of tricks usually starts at five or six if a player is alone and at seven or eight when he has a partner, these specifics are very much subject to change. Partners cannot converse while bidding and only the one that joins can do the bidding. He has the option to "pass parole", allowing his partner to decide. This is however only permitted once the bid reaches 10.

Note that there are as many variant rules as there are groups that play the game.

== Game modes ==
This is also the hierarchy, a lower game will overrule a higher one.

- passing: each player bids a different suit or everyone passes, cards are re-dealt.
- asking and joining: the bidding process determines the trump.
- small misery: a player thinks he can't get any tricks. He is allowed to discard one card (as are the other players). The other players must try to force him to get a trick.
- picollissimo: is sometimes played, a player must get exactly two tricks.
- picollo: is sometimes played, a player must get exactly one trick.
- abondance: a player can get 9 tricks by himself and gets to decide the trump colour.
- large misery: like small misery, but without the discarding.
- trull: a player has 3 or four aces and is forced to team up with the one holding the fourth ace (or the king of hearts). The partner with the fourth ace gets to decide on trump and announces his choice during the first trick. If a player has all four aces and the king of hearts, he partners with the queen of hearts (and further down the deck of hearts as needed).
- jeu blanc: if you have no face cards in your hand, you can ask for a re-deal. In should be announced before anyone starts talking at the beginning of the game.
- open misery: like large misery, but a player has to put his cards (pictures up) on the table so everyone can see his hand. The opponents are not allowed to discuss tactics.
- solo: a player thinks he can get all 13 tricks, and gets to choose the trump.

Some player groups may choose to play without small misery, picollissimo and picollo, as these "special modes" are otherwise chosen too often.

Some groups also play without the possibility of re-dealing when all players bid on different suits.

== Scoring ==
This is all very much subject to change. Everyone uses their own rules.

- All Pass or Jeu Blanc: double score of next game.
- Bidding: 2p to get your bid, 1p for every extra trick.
- Abondance: 5p, 1p for every extra trick.
- Small misery: 5p.
- Picollo: 10p.
- Large misery: 15p.
- Open misery: 30p.
- Trull: bidding score x 2.
- Solo: 50p.

Note that if a game is 2vs2 each player will win or lose this number of points. If a game is 3vs1, the one going alone will win (or lose) 3x this number. This will make sure that the balance of points is always in equilibrium. Also note that doublers (pass, jeu blanc and trull) are cumulative (instead of multiplying) e.g. after two pass rounds score is dealt x3, after three pass rounds x4, after three pass rounds and trull x5 etc.
