= Willy's en Marjetten =

Flemish comedy TV series

- Genre: Sketch show, Mockumentary, Satire, Tragicomedy
- Created by: Neveneffecten; Bart De Pauw
- Country of origin: Belgium
- Original language: Dutch

Production
- Running time: 30 minutes
- Production company: Woestijnvis

Original release
- Network: Eén
- Release: 15 October – 31 December 2006

Willy's en Marjetten is a Flemish comedy TV series created by Neveneffecten and Bart De Pauw. The first season aired on Eén in 2006. The program was produced by Woestijnvis.

Each episode takes the form of a broadcast made by a fictional pirate television station from a fictional small-minded village in East Flanders, staffed by a small number of VJs who introduce various sketches disguised as news or human interest reports. The style of both the program and its official website is deliberately amateurish. Most episodes involve a framing story which intertwines with certain sketches. Many characters are recurring and feature several catchphrases. The series sometimes includes sketches about current news, such as a baby found at a railway station, but also reacted to some negative critique, not taking itself too seriously.

Originally, a 13-episode series was planned. However, shortly before the end of 2006 the VRT announced that the final two episodes would not air, because of mixed reception and lower than expected audience shares, and that the eleventh episode (broadcast on 31 December 2006) would be a clip show. Though there are no current plans, a sequel has been considered.

The final episode included some new material, showing the main cast, now homeless, trying to survive a cold winter night out on the street. As the episode progressed, their condition deteriorated due to malnutrition and hypothermia. At the episode's end, a final shot showed the main characters had frozen to death.

It was reasoned that the show's absurd humour and satire might have had more success on Canvas, the public network's cultural channel (Eén had shown programs with similar humour in the past, but had since become more family-oriented). Even though the series disappointed in audience shares in its original run, it has since gained popularity as a cult show, with the Internet providing more suitable audiences; on sites such as YouTube several sketches have had twice as many viewers as when aired on television.
