= Basta (TV series) =

Flemish comedy show

- Basta series poster
- Genre: Sketch show, Mockumentary, Satire, Tragicomedy
- Created by: Neveneffecten
- Directed by: Mark Uytterhoeven
- Country of origin: Belgium
- Original language: Dutch
- No. of series: 1
- No. of episodes: 6

Production
- Running time: 52 minutes
- Production company: Woestijnvis

Original release
- Network: VRT 1
- Release: 10 January – 14 February 2011

Basta was a Flemish television show that aired in January and February 2011 on the Belgian channel Eén. Hosted by Neveneffecten and produced by Woestijnvis, the series incorporates a mix of comedy, current affairs and crime, with Neveneffecten targeting and exposing companies and individuals engaged in fraudulent activities. Such targets included rigged television quiz channels and advance-fee scam.

Although Basta performed successfully, a second season was not produced, as Neveneffecten thought their approach would no longer work due to potential targets being aware of the program.

== Subjects ==
=== Recharge money from bank ===
In 2008, many Belgian banks got money from the government following the 2008 financial crisis. This was however paid with tax money. Basta contacted all those banks and requested if they could recharge their money, which was estimated at 250 euros for each Belgian inhabitant. No bank did pay them, so Basta decided to take another approach: they stole staplers, hole punchers etc. from the desks.

Later, Basta founded a new bank: Fides Bank with a limited amount of money (only €150). Although there was a bank crisis, partially caused by mismanagement, many CEO's of those banks still got huge royalties. In same concept, Fides Bank paid their CEO's a royalty of €150 and went bankrupt. As they were a bank, they also requested the Belgian government to give 20 billion euros to save the company. Their request was ignored and classified.

=== Fake news ===
In June 2010 Woestijnvis was charged as they sent fake news items to the press. Woestijnvis did acknowledge this, but also told it was meant as part of a new show. It was the intention of Basta to verify if the media did check news items on trustworthy or not. Basta succeeded partially as some of their fake news items were indeed published by several media, but they were unmasked.

=== Mobistar Helpdesk ===
Residents complain about the helpdesk of many telecom operators. There are long wait times, repetitive questions, unwanted inquiries, different menus and submenus, calls just hung up by the agent, many transfers.

Basta placed a container in front of the main entrance of Mobistar Evere and painted a telephone number on it. Furthermore, they created a calldesk with a similar setup as used at Mobistar. One of the security agents of Mobistar called the number with the request to move the container. Basta used same techniques as Mobistar such as long waiting times, different agents who always ask same questions, long menus etc. After many calls by the security agent, Basta removed the container a few hours later.

=== Call games ===
Some Belgian television channels had viewer phone call games where a caller could win money awards. The live submissions already proved there was some kind of cheating: the words to find were unknown by general public, math questions could not be solved with traditional mathematics, in case the callers could give some correct answers the question was changed, envelopes which contained the solution were quickly replaced.

Basta could prove these games were indeed a fraud. De Neveneffecten found a job posing as host for such games and they asked Maxime De Winne to apply for the job and to go undercover. Maxime got the job and was a host for about 4 months where he used hidden cameras to record conversations with the management. Neveneffecten also hired a math expert: Gaetan De Weert. After some months, Gaetan was able to solve every math puzzle, but noticed the answer of the puzzle is incorrect in 16% of the cases due to miscalculation of the producers. Gaetan called the studio and was able to give the correct answer. He also said the show was a fraud and he was going to publish the solution key on the Internet, which he actually did.

The episode was aired on 17 January 2011 and caused national controversy. The channels vtm and 2BE decided to cancel the call games as from 18 January 2011. The broadcast did not have any effect in Wallonia where the games are still aired.

=== SABAM ===
SABAM is the Belgian association of authors, composers and publishers. SABAM got permission of the Belgian law to charge money when someone organizes an event where authorized music, plays, ... is used. SABAM is even allowed to do this even in case the composer is not a member of SABAM. In such cases, SABAM should give the money to the correct authoring company.

Basta organized some parties without attendees and created some conditions which were free from SABAM charge, such as organizing a party in a room which was smaller than 1 square metre. According to SABAM, a fee has to be paid from 1 square metre. Furthermore, they organized a party with artists who do not exist. They made some music via improvisation and used different kitchen tools such as mixers, microwaves, packaging. In all cases, SABAM sent a bill and stated all their charges were legal. However, they only paid back the fee for the fake artists after Basta sent a formal complaint.

After airing, SABAM was compromised in the Belgian Senate.

=== Calf Willy ===
Basta announced they were going to organize a barbecue with some of their friends. They showed a picture of Willy, a calf. During next week, the viewers could vote on their website if Willy could be slaughtered and eaten or not. Although the viewers choose not to kill Willy, Basta told the invitees they did eat Willy. As a result, many of the invitees felt guilty.

In reality, Willy was not killed. Basta proved that meateaters do not have a problem to eat an anonymous animal, but mostly refuse if they did know the beast.

=== Internet fraud ===
Basta contacted a Nigerian imposter who claimed to sell gold. The man came to Belgium and his visit was recorded with a hidden camera. The members of Basta dressed up as an eccentric family, a dwarf as butler (who was partially paralyzed and had to ride on a pony), some rituals,... At the end, the (fake) police did a raid and the family was arrested whilst the imposter was present. The imposter was immediately set free as there was no warrant for him.
