= Mark Uytterhoeven =

Belgian television presenter

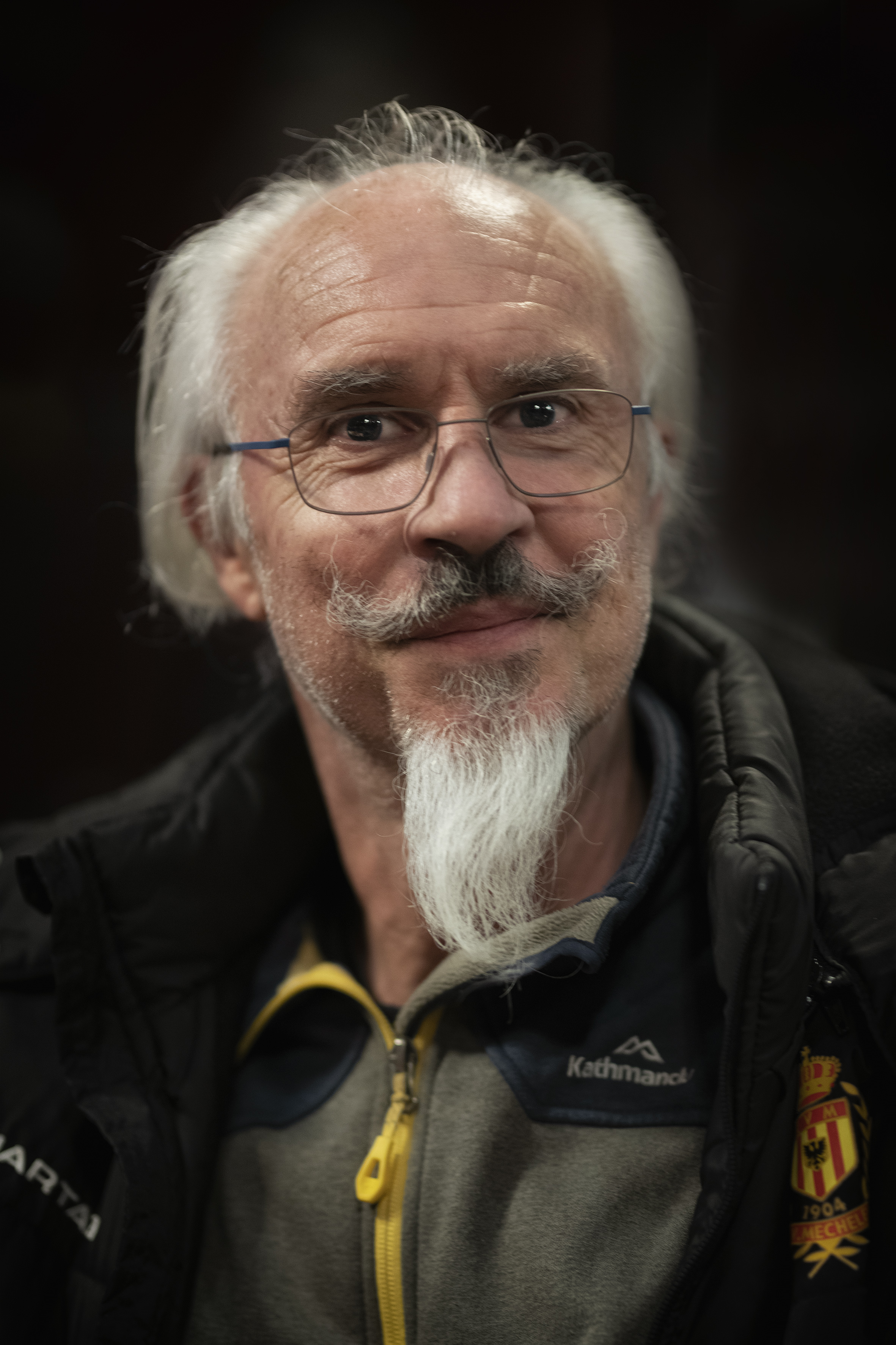
- Uytterhoeven in 2021
- Born: Mechelen, Belgium
- Occupations: Television presenter; TV scriptwriter; actor; comedian; sports journalist

Mark Uytterhoeven is a Belgian television presenter, TV scriptwriter, actor, comedian and former sports journalist.

== Career ==
Uytterhoeven started his career at the Flemish public TV channel BRT (nowadays VRT), where he was a sports journalist. In 1991 he hosted the humorous TV talk show Het Huis van Wantrouwen, alongside Wouter Vandenhaute. The show was a ratings hit and praised for its innovative style. Two years later, Uytterhoeven followed it up with another humorous TV talk show, Morgen Maandag (1993), which he hosted on his own. Because of the overwhelming success, Uytterhoeven decided to focus on hosting humorous shows without much media promotion, like the improvisation show Onvoorziene Omstandigheden (1994–1995) and the sketch series Alles Kan Beter (1997–1999).

He is also credited with writing the script for the human interest show Man bijt hond in 2001, and was host of the late night talk show De Laatste Show until Frieda Van Wijck took it over from him in 2006.

== TV filmography ==
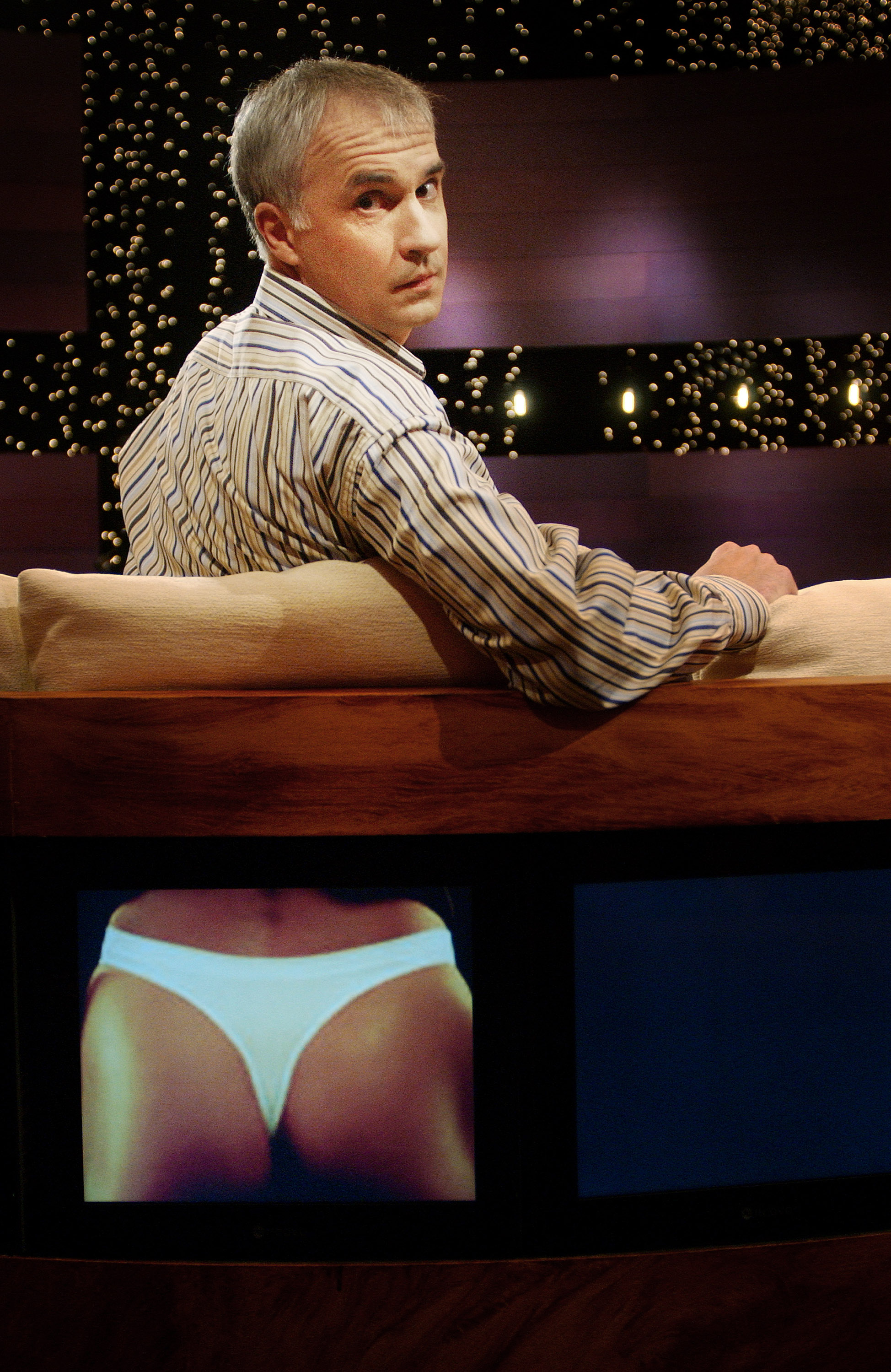
Uytterhoeven in the decor of De Laatste Show (2003)

- De Laatste vriend (1993)
- Morgen maandag (1993) TV Series .... Gastheer
- De Magische steen (1988) .... Swimming teacher

... aka Pierre magique, La (Belgium: French title)

- Feest! 50 jaar televisie (2003) (TV) .... Himself
- De Laatste show (1999) TV Series .... Host (2002-)
- Alles komt terug (2001) TV Series .... Himself
- Alles Kan Beter (1998) TV Series .... Himself
- Onvoorziene Omstandigheden (1994–1995) TV Series .... Himself
- Morgen Maandag (1993) TV Series .... Himself
- Het Huis van wantrouwen (1991–1992) TV Series .... Himself
- Tien voor taal (1995) TV Series .... Himself
- Sportweekend (1960) TV Series .... Presentator
