= In de gloria =

Flemish comedy show

- In de Gloria DVD box cover
- Genre: Sketch show, Mockumentary, Satire, Sketch comedy, Tragicomedy
- Created by: Jan Eelen
- Directed by: Jan Eelen
- Country of origin: Belgium
- Original language: Dutch
- No. of seasons: 2
- No. of episodes: 20

Production
- Producer: Woestijnvis
- Running time: 25 minutes
- Production company: Woestijnvis

Original release
- Network: VRT
- Release: 11 February 2000 – 28 April 2001

In de Gloria (English: "In the Glory") is a Belgian TV sketch comedy show, directed by Jan Eelen and produced by the company Woestijnvis that lasted from 11 February 2000 to 28 April 2001. It is a mockumentary series which satirizes reality television and human interest shows, especially targeting the way regular people are exploited by media.

The show ran on the Belgian public TV channel Canvas for two seasons of 10 episodes each. In Flanders itself, the series received critical acclaim and continues to enjoy significant popularity, with several sketches having gained classic status. Despite the local popularity, the show has never been exported outside of Belgium.

== Concept ==
In de Gloria is a mockumentary in sketch show format. Every episode consists of a series of sketches that are mostly improvised around a central idea. The tone is tragicomical. Eelen based some of the spoof targets on pre-existing TV formats, including some shows of his own company, Woestijnvis. In an interview, Eelen said he was inspired by the Dutch mockumentaries of Van Kooten en De Bie and Arjan Ederveen's 30 minuten.

== Cast ==
Cast of In De Gloria. From left to right: Lucas Van den Eynde, Wim Opbrouck, Tom Van Dyck and Frank Focketyn (first row), Sien Eggers, An Miller and Tania Van der Sanden (bottom row)

- Sien Eggers
- Frank Focketyn
- Kris Focketyn as Jos Vermaelen from Vermaelen projects
- An Miller
- Wim Opbrouck
- Lucas Van den Eynde
- Tania Van der Sanden
- Tom Van Dyck

== Status ==
In de Gloria has been lauded by TV critics ever since it first aired. In 2002, it received the Prijs van de Vlaamse Radio-en Televisiekritiek for "Best TV Show". It's also popular with viewers. All seasons are available on DVD.

== Internet notoriety ==
The sketch "Boemerang" (English: "Boomerang") from the very first episode of In de gloria gained notoriety on YouTube after a copy was uploaded onto YouTube on 2 August 2006. It features the host of a talk show interviewing victims of medical failures. One of the victims speaks in a squeaky voice due to a botched tonsillectomy. The host tries to suppress his laughter, to no avail. Eventually, another botched surgery victim from the audience talks to the host in a comically deep and rough voice, worsening his laughing fit.

The full sketch shows the TV host in a supposed archive TV show (hence the title Boemerang) looking back on the infamous moment that got him fired in the past. The show's host, Erik Hartman, is played by Tom Van Dyck; his two guests Valère (romanized in the upload's subtitles as Valair) and Marijke are portrayed by Lucas Van den Eynde and An Miller, respectively.

It quickly became an Internet meme among foreigners who mistook it for being real. In September 2006, the YouTube clip was even shown during The Tonight Show with Jay Leno and Star Channel news, with both hosts announcing it as being real.

Parts of the Boemerang sketch were also featured in an Argentinian television advertisement for Quilmes beer, titled Risas (laughs), where Hartman is seen laughing.
