= Melle, Belgium =

Melle
- Municipality
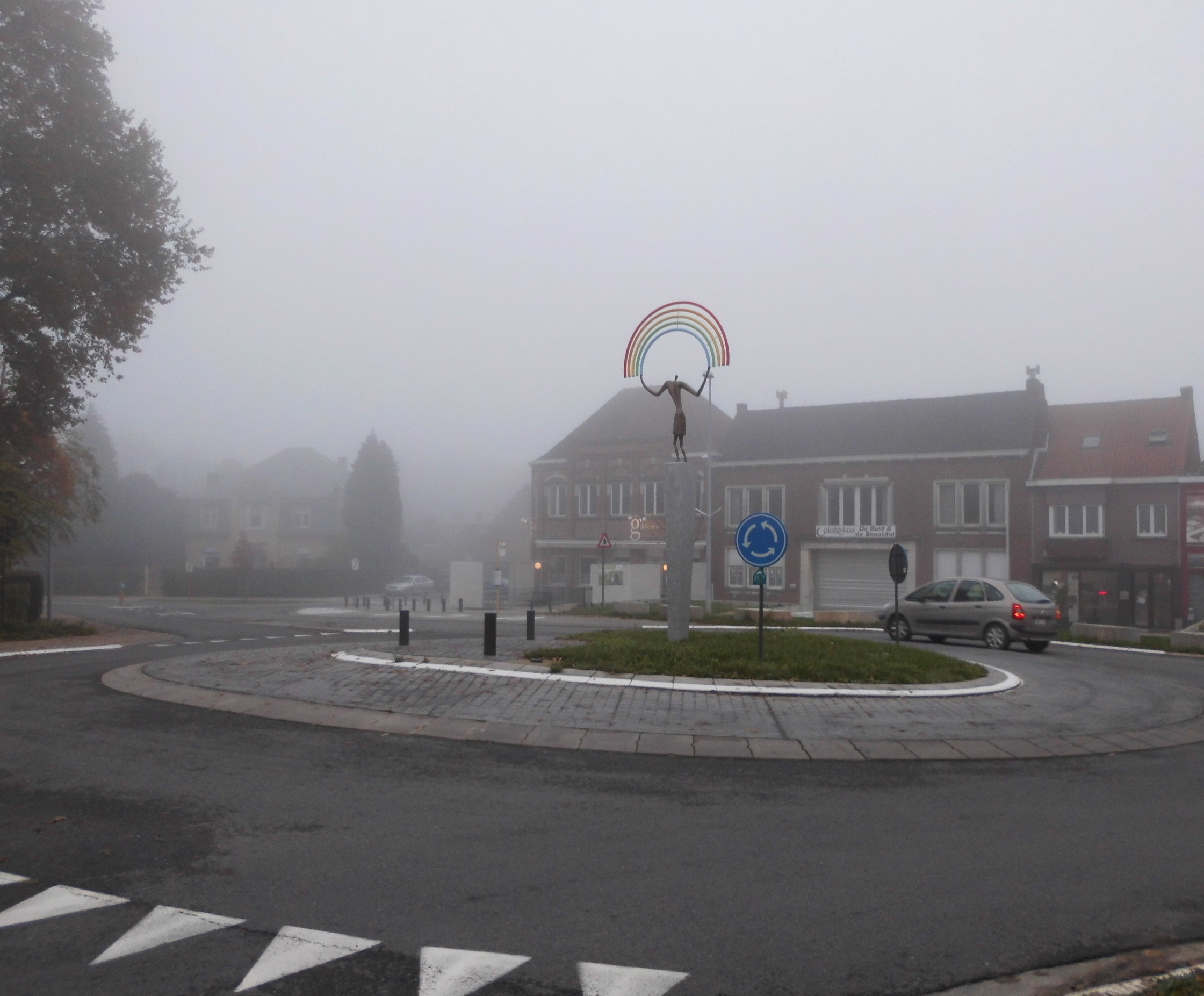

- Flag Coat of arms

- Location of Melle in East Flanders
- Interactive map of Melle
- Location in Belgium
- Coordinates: 51°00′N 03°48′E
- Country: Belgium
- Community: Flemish Community
- Region: Flemish Region
- Province: East Flanders
- Arrondissement: Ghent

Government
  - Mayor: Dirk De Maeseneer (CD&V)
  - Governing parties: CD&V, N-VA

Population (2018-01-01)
  - Total: 11,574
- Postal codes: 9090
- NIS code: 44040
- Area codes: 09
- Website: www.melle.be

Melle (Dutch pronunciation: [ˈmɛlə]) is a former municipality located in the Belgian province of East Flanders. The municipality comprises the villages of Gontrode and Melle proper. On 1 January 2018 Melle had a total population of 11,574. The total area is 15.21 km² which gives a population density of 761 inhabitants per km².

Melle was mentioned in documents in 830, although the archeological findings prove the region was inhabited long before that date.

The name Melle has two possible derivations: the Celtic word melina means "brown water"; the prehistoric name Melinos means "honey yellow".

The village of Melle consists of three regions: Melle-Centre, Melle-Vogelhoek and Gontrode (since the fusion in 1976).

One of its famous products is the Delirium Tremens beer, bottled by the Huyghe brewery. This beer is exported worldwide and was voted "Best beer in the world" in 1998 at the World Beer Championships in Chicago, Illinois, USA.

Miss Belgium 2000, Joke van de Velde grew up and went to high school in Melle.

The College van de paters Jozefieten, founded in 1837 by canon Constant Van Crombrugghe is known all around the country. Several Belgian and international celebrities went to this school (e.g. Cédric Van Branteghem (runner), a brother of Princess Mathilde). It was the first school in Belgium where a commercial science and an industrial science course were offered. An Irish student brought along a football in 1863. This was the first football to reach the European continent.

The village gained more national fame thanks to the TV show Schalkse Ruiters, which featured host Bart De Pauw playing a comedy character named The Man from Melle and who claimed to be from the (then non-existent) Koekoekstraat nr. 70 in Melle. At a certain point the city council decided to name one of their new streets Koekoekstraat and painted a door with house number 70 on the wall.

== Climate ==
Climate data for Melle (1991−2020 normals)
Month	Jan	Feb	Mar	Apr	May	Jun	Jul	Aug	Sep	Oct	Nov	Dec	Year
Mean daily maximum °C (°F)	6.7 (44.1)	7.6 (45.7)	11.1 (52.0)	15.1 (59.2)	18.6 (65.5)	21.3 (70.3)	23.4 (74.1)	23.3 (73.9)	20.0 (68.0)	15.4 (59.7)	10.4 (50.7)	7.1 (44.8)	15.0 (59.0)
Daily mean °C (°F)	4.0 (39.2)	4.4 (39.9)	7.0 (44.6)	10.0 (50.0)	13.6 (56.5)	16.4 (61.5)	18.4 (65.1)	18.2 (64.8)	15.1 (59.2)	11.4 (52.5)	7.4 (45.3)	4.5 (40.1)	10.9 (51.6)
Mean daily minimum °C (°F)	1.2 (34.2)	1.1 (34.0)	2.9 (37.2)	4.8 (40.6)	8.6 (47.5)	11.5 (52.7)	13.4 (56.1)	13.0 (55.4)	10.2 (50.4)	7.4 (45.3)	4.3 (39.7)	1.9 (35.4)	6.7 (44.1)
Average precipitation mm (inches)	71.4 (2.81)	59.8 (2.35)	57.1 (2.25)	44.5 (1.75)	59.1 (2.33)	70.6 (2.78)	78.0 (3.07)	90.2 (3.55)	71.2 (2.80)	71.7 (2.82)	84.7 (3.33)	90.8 (3.57)	849.1 (33.43)
Average precipitation days (≥ 1.0 mm)	12.8	11.7	10.4	9.6	10.1	10.1	10.3	10.8	10.5	11.5	13.5	14.1	135.5
Mean monthly sunshine hours	63	80	137	190	219	219	225	211	166	121	70	54	1,753
Source: Royal Meteorological Institute
