= Aram Van Ballaert =

Belgian guitarist and composer

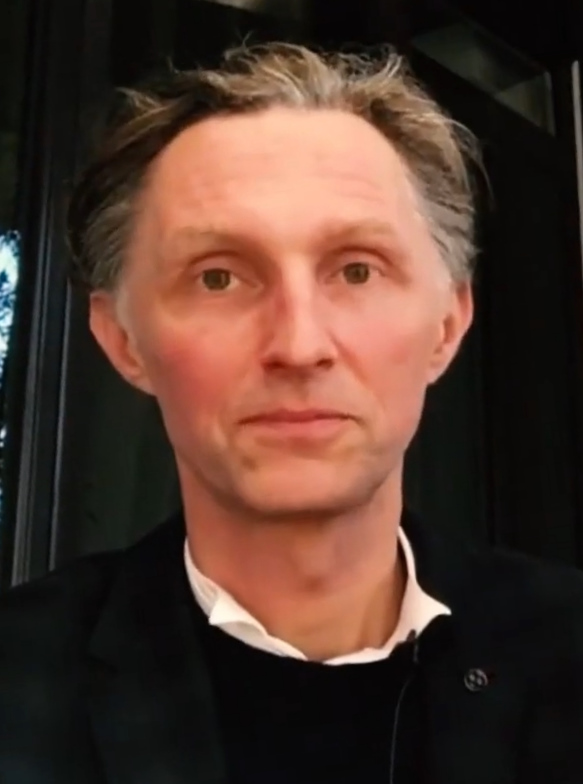
- Aram Van Ballaert in 2018

Background information
- Born: 29 May 1971 (age 55); Belgium
- Genres: Classical, pop, rock, soundtracks
- Occupations: Guitarist, composer
- Instruments: Guitar, drums, piano
- Years active: 1988–present
- Member of: The Clement Peerens Explosition; Novastar; Ronny Mosuse
- Website: www.aram.be

Aram Van Ballaert (29 May 1971) is a Belgian guitarist and composer who is active since 1988. His classical guitar background resulted in a series of concerts throughout Europe, Africa, and the Middle-East. Since 2012, Van Ballaert has been a composer for films and television.

== Career ==
After being involved in several international co-productions as a guest musician with Belgian orchestras like the Royal Philharmonic Orchestra of Flanders and the Flemish Radio Orchestra, Van Ballaert started building a solo career.

The CDs Danza (2002) and TRI (2005) resulted in a series of concerts throughout Belgium, the Netherlands, Bulgaria, Hungary, Ukraine, the Democratic Republic of Congo and Saudi Arabia. In co-operation with the ensemble Piacevole and bandoneon player Alfredo Marcucci, Van Ballaert performed as a soloist in numerous performances of the double concerto of Astor Piazzolla.

As a pop musician, Van Ballaert is the guitarist of Ronny Mosuse and Novastar, of which there is a live DVD (EMI) released in 2009. Since 2008, Van Ballaert is also playing the drums in The Clement Peerens Explosition, a trio led by Hugo Matthysen.

In addition to the above, Van Ballaert is working as a composer for television and film. In 2012, he has written the soundtrack for Belgian prime time series Quiz Me Quick, directed by Jan Matthys and written by Bart De Pauw.

Besides his performing activities, Van Ballaert lectures at the Lemmensinstituut (University for Science and Arts) in Leuven, Belgium.

== Discography ==
=== Albums ===
- The Hum (2000) – in cooperation with Anton Walgrave
- Before The Dawn (2002) – in cooperation with Anton Walgrave
- Danza (2002) – solo
- Stronger (2002) – in cooperation with Ronny Mosuse
- TRI (2005) – solo
- Shine (2006) – in cooperation with Anton Walgrave
- Allemaal Anders (2008) – in cooperation with Ronny Mosuse
- Almost Bangor (2008) – in cooperation with Novastar
- Masterworks (2008) – in cooperation with Clement Peerens Explosition
- Olraait! (2011) – in cooperation with Clement Peerens Explosition
- Quiz me Quick (2012) – Aram & ensemble

=== DVD ===
- Live in Congo (2008) – in cooperation with Ronny Mosuse
- Almost Bangor (Live) (2009) – in cooperation with Novastar

=== Composition for Television ===
- Quiz me Quick (2012) – Director Jan Matthys / Screenplay Bart De Pauw
