= Hove, Belgium =

Hove
- Municipality
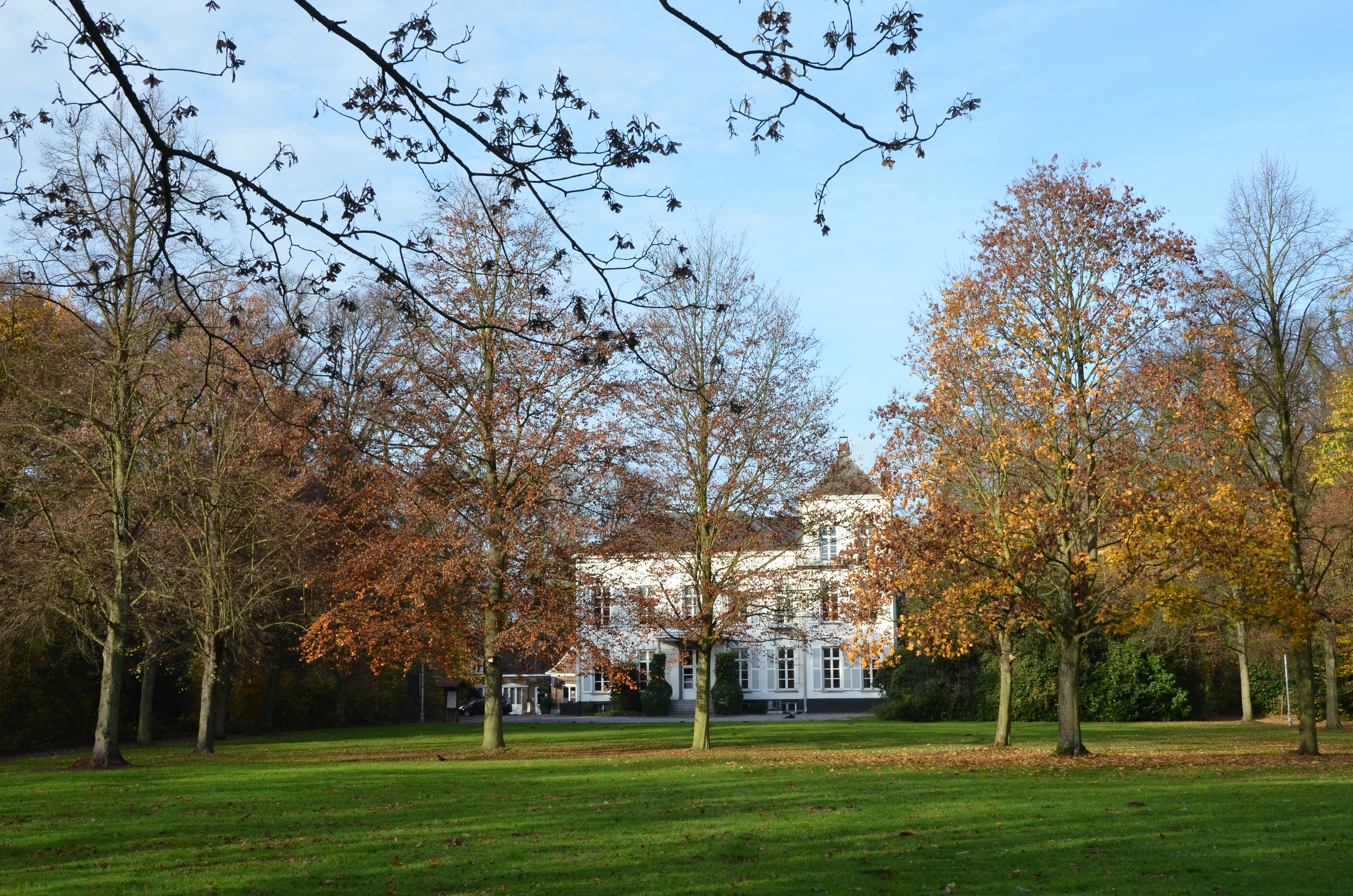
- Town hall

- Flag Coat of arms

- Location of Hove in the province of Antwerp
- Interactive map of Hove
- Location in Belgium
- Coordinates: 51°09′N 04°28′E
- Country: Belgium
- Community: Flemish Community
- Region: Flemish Region
- Province: Antwerp
- Arrondissement: Antwerp

Government
  - Mayor: Bart Van Couwenberge (N-VA)
  - Governing parties: N-VA, Fan Van Hove

Area
  - Total: 6.02 km^{2} (2.32 sq mi)

Population (2025-01-01)
  - Total: 8,366
  - Density: 1,390/km^{2} (3,600/sq mi)
- Postal codes: 2540
- NIS code: 11021
- Area codes: 03
- Website: www.hove.be

Hove (Dutch pronunciation: [ˈɦoːvə]) is a municipality (gemeente) located in the Belgian province of Antwerp. The municipality only comprises the town of Hove proper. In 2021, Hove had a total population of 8,287. The total area is 5.99 km^{2}.

Situated roughly 9 kilometres (5.6 mi) from Antwerp, the provincial capital, Hove is renowned for its exclusivity, and it is often cited as one of Belgium's most affluent areas. In 2025, Hove ranked fourth on the list of most expensive municipalities in the Flemish Region (after Knokke-Heist, Sint-Martens-Latem, and Kraainem), and fourth on the list of Belgian municipalities ranked based on the average annual income of the population in 2021.

== Notable residents ==
- Hugo Matthysen
- Bart Peeters
- Jan Leyers - singer-songwriter/philosopher/TV-producer/celebrity

== Bibliography ==
- Van Den Weygaert, Luc. "Hove in de wereld" (Hove in the world), Edit. Ouderits, Hove (Antwerp), 2010, 26 p.
- Van Den Weygaert, Luc. "Hove, culturele en toeristische verkenningen", Edit. Ouderits, Hove (Antwerp), 2012, 24 p.
- Van Gysel, Albert. "Bijdrage tot de geschiedenis van Hove" (The History of Hove), Edit. Jos Verheyen, Boechout (Antwerp), 1957, 80 p.
