= Quiz Me Quick =

Belgian Dutch-language drama comedy television series

- Series DVD box cover
- Written by: Bart De Pauw, Jonas Geirnaert, Bart Vaessen, Steve De Wilde
- Directed by: Jan Matthys
- Country of origin: Belgium
- Original language: Dutch
- No. of seasons: 1
- No. of episodes: 10

Production
- Producers: Helen Perquy, Dries Phlypo
- Running time: 50 minutes
- Production companies: PRIME Series, Eén

Original release
- Network: PRIME Series, VRT 1
- Release: 29 April – 1 June 2012

Quiz Me Quick is a Flemish fiction series produced by Koeken Troef for the Belgian national broadcasting company Eén and the digital channel Prime Series. The series won prizes such as a Rockie Award at the World Media Festival in Banff. It first aired on Prime Series on April 29, 2012, before airing on the Flemish public channel Eén on October 21, 2012.

== Synopsis ==
Five people meet each other coincidentally in a pub where a quiz is about to start. They decide to form a team and participate under the name "Tafel 7" (Table 7) as they are the seventh team. Despite their contrasts in personality they agree to team up for other quizzes in the future and win the Superprestige quiz as their ultimate goal. As the series progresses each candidate reveals more secrets about themselves.

== Episodes ==
No.	Title	Original release date
1	"Tafel 7"	April 29, 2012
Nick is a delivery boy working for an Asian restaurant. One day he delivers some food to a local pub where a pub quiz is about to start. Nick convinces four other people to subscribe under the name Tafel 7. They win the quiz. However, Nick is fired by his employer as he participated the quiz during his working hours.
2	"In de Naam der Weet"	May 6, 2012
The local police corps organizes a quiz. Nick wants to participate with "Tafel 7", but Roger is not interested. Eventually Nick can persuade him. At the quiz they meet the Coromar-team. Coromar is Belgium's best and famous quiz team and won the Superprestige: a renominated quiz where participation is only possible if a team earned enough points during several qualifying quizzes. That night, Nick had to close the hairdresser's saloon of Simonneke, where his girlfriend Cynthia works.
3	"Der Weetjesdief"	May 13, 2012
As Nick forgot to close the hairdresser's saloon a dryer overheated and burnt down the building. Cynthia wants to rebuild the shop with the help of Gwendy. Tafel 7 subscribes for the quiz hold at the local school where Armand works at the reprography-service. Armand was able to grasp and copy the questions before start of the quiz.
4	"De Prins en de Professor"	May 20, 2012
Nick, meanwhile working at a call center, tries to convince Tafel 7 to participate with the qualifying rounds for Superprestige. As he makes these calls during his working hours, he is fired. In the first quiz the team can have 6 participants. Lennon meets someone who seems to know much. During the quiz it turns out the man is rather hard-of-hearing and therefore obnoxiously loud. Armand has trouble keeping his alcohol problem under control. Coromar is making fun of Roger and make mysterious remarks about the "Horse of Parijs". Gwendy gets a loan at the bank to invest in the hair dressing saloon, but does not inform Luc.
5	"Het Paard van Parijs"	May 27, 2012
Cynthia reopens the hairdresser's saloon and recruits Tamara and Mario. Nick finds a video on the internet showing a clip from De IQ-Quiz (a quiz show which existed in real life). Roger was a participant in the 1980s and mistakenly answered "Het paard van Parijs" ("the horse of Paris") instead of "Het paard van Troje" (the Trojan Horse).When the question was asked, Roger noticed his girlfriend was in the studio and he immediately thought about Paris. That's why he answered incorrectly.
6	"Al Qaida"	June 3, 2012
The mysterious Monica introduces Tafel 7 to her grandfather: a quiz coach. After some tests, the coach concludes Tafel 7 is a very strong group as every person is specialized in some study field. Nick is able to remember trivia, Lennon is a music expert, Luc knows everything about sports, Armand is an expert in history and Roger knows something about almost everything. The team has also some hindrances: Lennon can't write nor read and Armand is addicted to alcohol. As there are almost no customers at Cynthia's shop, Gwendy seeks for a solution. A drunk Armand makes a crucial error during next quiz by turning in an empty page instead of the page with answers.
7	"Ovidius"	June 10, 2012
Armand is kicked out of the team. Cynthia thinks Nick is paying too much attention towards Monica and set ups an action plan together with Gwendy. Mario declares Cynthia his love. Nick gets a call from his neurosurgery: he has a tumour in his brains which explains his black outs. Luc and Gwendy agree to sell their photo shop.
8	"Van de Kat en de Melk"	June 17, 2012
Luc reveals why he has a roll of unclear photos turned in by some customer every day. It turns out his blind father, who lives in a retirement home, takes the pictures. When his father got blind, Luc was the eldest son of the family. With regrets he stopped his football career to take over the shop of his father so there was an income to support the other family members who were all under-aged. Whilst visiting his father, Luc notices Andre and sneakily follows him. According to another inhabitant, the wife of Andre had a concussion and never recovered. Almost at same time, Roger is visiting the school to bring over his apologies to André. There he finds out André's 18-year-old son died during a hit and run some years before. Armand started drinking to forget his misery. Actually, it was Armand who decided to stop as a teacher. Not because of his addiction, but he had the feeling he saw his son in every one of his young students. Coromar asks Roger to become member of their team.
9	"De Wraak van Coromar"	June 24, 2012
Tafel 7 must win the next quiz to qualify for Superprestige. Monica tells Cynthia Nick cheated on her, although it is a lie. André decided to reject Coromar's question but the members of Tafel 7 are astonished when it turns out Armand is now part of that team. Lennon must finish some job at work and eventually gets help from the other employees. As he is in a hurry, he takes a company's huge electric pallet jack to drive to the quiz. Later on he is arrested for stealing. Tafel 7 is surprised they won the quiz although it should have been Coromar. It turns out Armand deliberately switched papers so Tafel 7 could win. Roger asks Armand to rejoin Tafel 7
10	"De Retorische vraag"	July 1, 2012
Nick is thrown out by Cynthia due to his cheating with Monica. Mario visits Monica and both set up an action plan to rejoin the couple. Tafel 7 is a participant at the Superprestige.

== Cast ==
- Dirk Van Dijck – Roger Sterckx

The eldest and smartest of the group. He is a grumpy, eccentric loner. Due to his knowledge, insight and experience with quizzes he is accepted by the group. Despite his gigantic knowledge, he made the biggest blunder in the Flemish history of quizzes. He once participated in the Belgian television show 'De IQ-Kwis' (The I.Q. Quiz). Instead of answering 'the horse of Troy' on some question, he said 'the horse of Paris' where he wanted to refer to Paris, the son of the king of Troy. Since then, he stopped playing quizzes.

- Jos Verbist – Armand De La Ruelle

Armand is a former school teacher. He gave ancient Greek and Latin and knows everything about these cultures. Due to some tragic events in past he is now addicted to alcohol. He is neglected by his colleagues and is now a "simple" supervisor in the study hall and works at the schools reprography. In contradiction the students adore Armand as he is a good narrator and his stories about the ancient Greek times are appreciated. However, due to his alcoholic abuse he gets drunk and makes serious errors when questions are asked.

- Tom Audenaert – Luc Auwerckx

Luc is married with Gwendy and they have 3 children. He was a talented soccer player but was forced to stop after his father got blind. Luc took over his fathers photographic shop with aversion. Luc never did market research nor followed courses. As a result, the shop only sells outdated cameras and develops rolls of film as Luc is even not aware digital cameras and online printing services exist. Luc is sometimes asked to make photo reports but the customers always complain about the disappointing result. In his leisure time he trains the juniors. He knows almost all facts about sports.

- Pieter Piron - Lennon

Lennon has a mental handicap. He works in a sheltered workshop and is terrorized by his supervisor Benny. He never learned to read and write. He loves music and movies and has a rather good auditive memory.

- Wietse Tanghe – Nick Van Loo

This young man is a jack of all trades. Although he is a talented cook, he first works as delivery boy in some Japanese restaurant. Later on he starts at a call center. He is very smart and is able to memorize useless facts. He lives with his girlfriend Cynthia on the third floor in the city centre. He is the one who convinces the others to go to the Superprestige Quiz.

- Liesa Naert – Cynthia Moons

She is a hairdresser. After the hairdressing salon burns down, she starts her own shop together with Gwendy. The shop becomes a success after they decide not only to do the hair of humans, but also dogs. She is in love with Nick but is always disappointed when he is fired again.

- Tine Embrechts – Gwendy

She is married with Luc and a very assertive woman. She overawes everyone.

- Rilke Eyckermans – Tamara

A naive colleague of Cynthia. She flirts with every man she meets.

- Kevin Janssens - Mario

He starts as a dog-trimmer in the salon of Cynthia although he is not qualified. He seems to have a good relationship with dogs as he even can handle the most aggressive ones. Mario is rather clumsy and childish. He is in love with Cyntia. It turns out he is a former para commando and in battle some years ago. Although he is not in the army anymore, he wants to solve many issues with violence or techniques used in the army.

- Bart De Pauw – Iwein

He is the leader of Coromar, the best Belgian quiz team.

- Clara Cleymans - Monica

The sexy Monica is fascinated with Nick. She is a headstrong and wants to have Nick for herself.

== Trivia ==
- De IQ-Kwis, which is part of the series' plot, was a real-life TV quiz broadcast on the Belgian public TV channel between 1980 and 1994. Footage of Roger Sterckx participating in this quiz in the 1980s was shown in the series, causing many viewers to assume this was genuine archive footage. In reality the set of De IQ-Kwis was rebuilt during production of Quiz Me Quick and combined with old archive footage of the actual show. Former host Herman Van Molle recorded lines from the script, which was edited with trick photography.

== Awards and nominations ==
- The series was nominated at the French Séries Mania
- The series won a Rockie Award at the World Media Festival in Banff, Alberta in category "best sitcom."
- Tine Embrechts won a Belgian Television Star for her role as Gwendy
