= The Clement Peerens Explosition =

Belgian parody rock group (1994–2023)

Clement Peerens Explosition
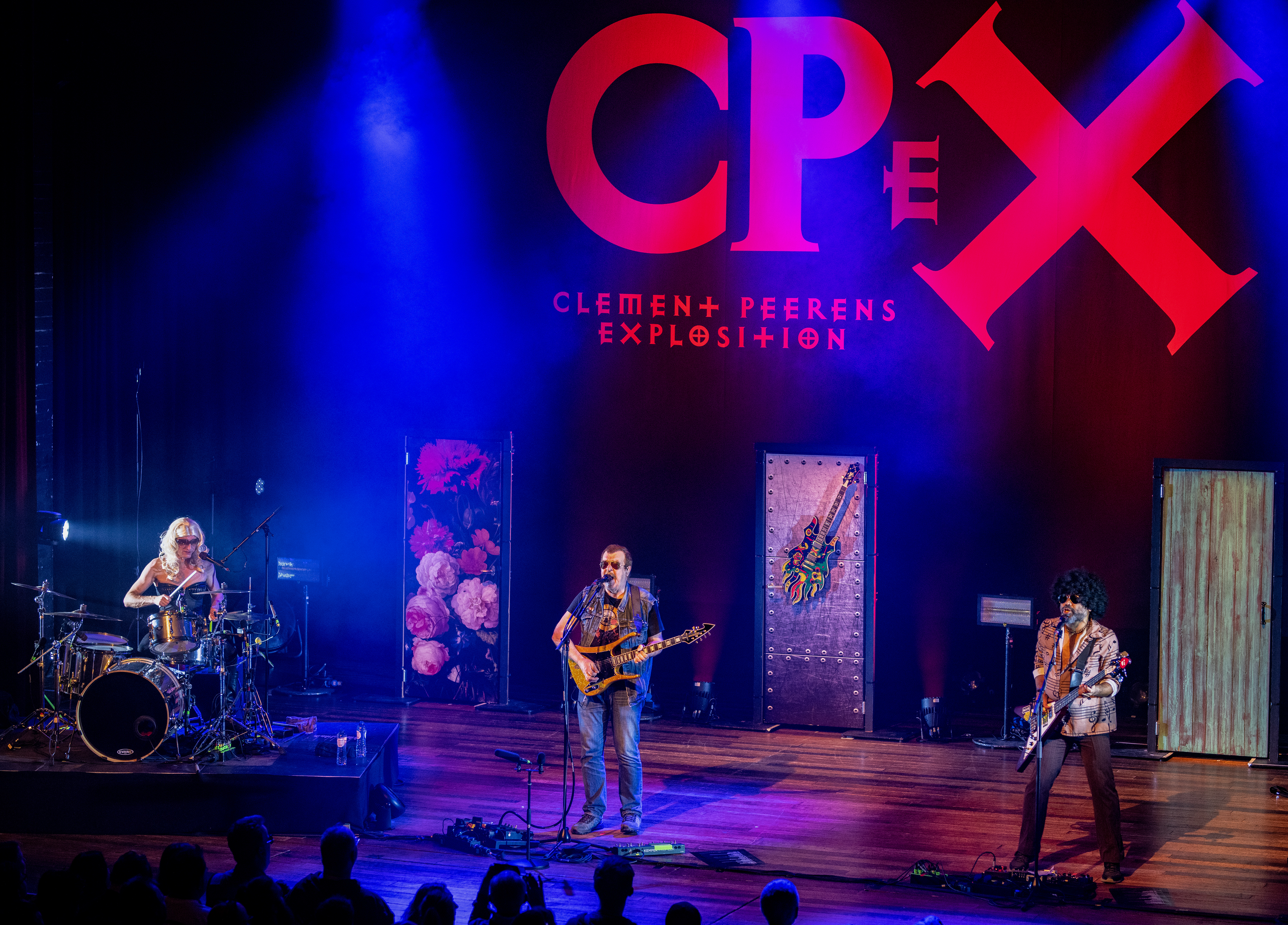
- CPeX during their farewell tour in 2023

Background information
- Origin: Antwerp, Belgium
- Genres: Comedy rock; parody; heavy metal; hard rock; punk rock; grunge; alternative rock; new wave
- Years active: 1994–2023
- Past members: Clement Peerens (Hugo Matthysen) "Black Magic" Sylvain Aertbeliën (Ronny Mosuse); Dave de Peuter (Aram Van Ballaert) "Vettige" Swa De Bock (Bart Peeters)

The Clement Peerens Explosition, or CPeX, was a Belgian parody rock group, created by Hugo Matthysen, Bart Peeters and Ronny Mosuse, the last two being former members of The Radios. The band was known for its comic lyrics in songs and interventions during performances, all in the Antwerp dialect.

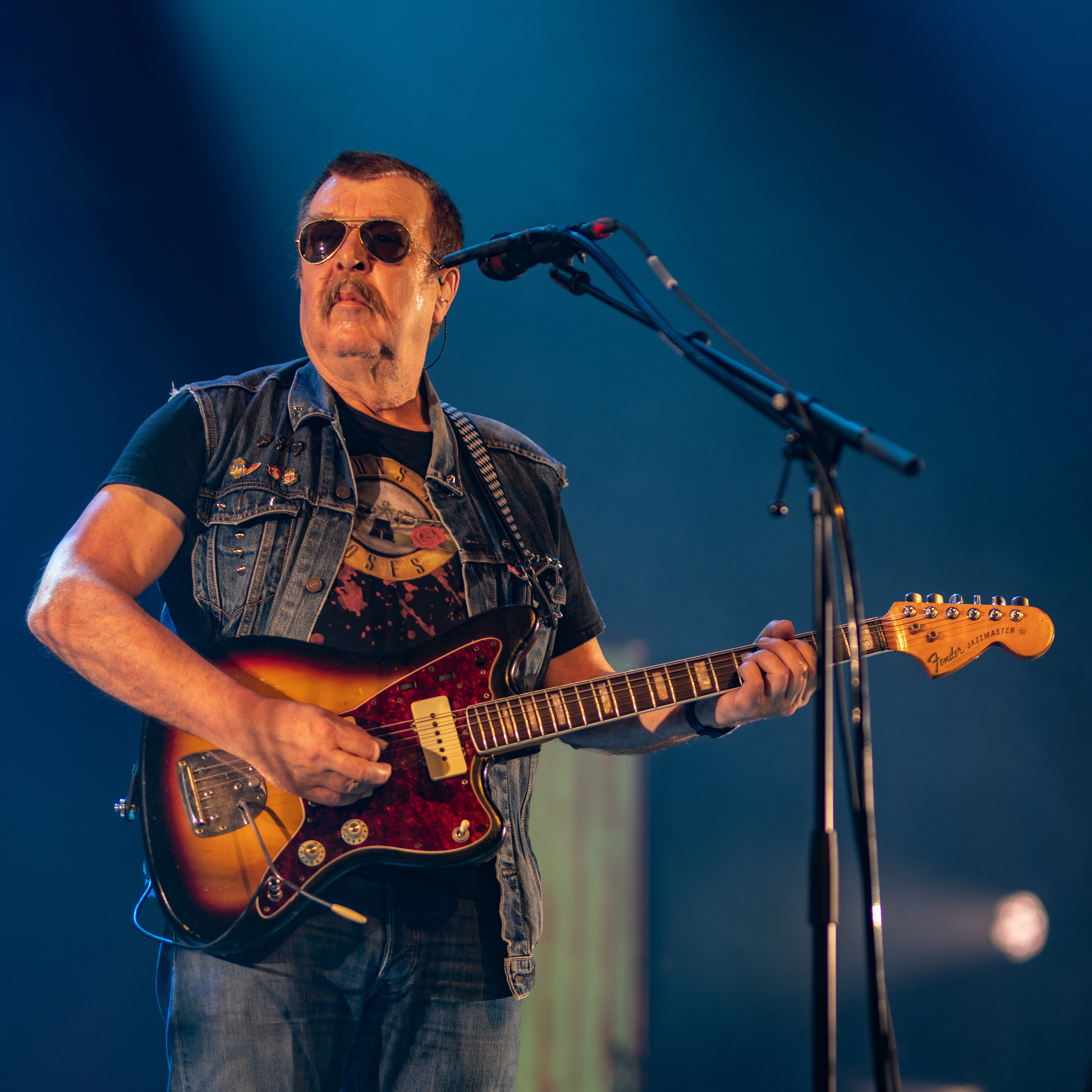
Clement Peerens in 2023

== History ==
During the early 1990s, Matthysen played the fictional character "Clement Peerens" on the comedy radio show Het Leugenpaleis and its televised successor, Het Peulengaleis. Peerens was portrayed as a self-proclaimed "pop expert", recounting ever-more outrageous anecdotes about current and past rock stars which were little more than drunken ramblings. As the character's popularity grew, it was decided to spin off an actual rock band, which began performing in 1994 and went on to release four albums. The last of these went on sale in 2000 and the band's performances became sporadic. In 2008, CPeX released a best-of album featuring some new material and began playing live again in a modified line-up, as Bart Peeters was forced to withdraw from the band for hearing problems. Aram Van Ballaert as Dave De Peuter/Lady Dave took his place as drummer. In 2011, the album Olraait was released (Antwerp dialect for the English "Alright"). The band released the single Boormachien in 2014. Since then, the Clement Peerens Explosition again toured regularly.

In 2021 Peerens announced the band would stop performing in december 2022. What was planned to be one concert ended up in ten, with 20.000 tickets sold. CPeX played their last ten farewell concerts in december 2022, ending on 7 January 2023 at De Roma in Antwerp.

Following that, the same members Mathysen, Mosuse and Van Ballaert formed a new band, Huroram. They mainly focus on Matthysen's earlier career, in standard Dutch.

== Style ==
Many of CPeX's lyrics cover inconsequential subjects, often reflecting Peerens' macho, borderline-misogynistic world view and lack of any real interests; subjects include ownership of the TV remote, trying not to answer questions about fashion, or the poor quality of cheap wine.

== Controversy ==
In 1995, the band released the album Foorwijf!. The title track caused a minor controversy, as some funfair operators believed they were being put in an unfairly negative light.

== Discography ==
Year	Title
1994	Dikke Lu
1995	Foorwijf!
1999	Vinde gij mijn gat?
2000	De wraak van moeder fazant op gescheiden vrouwen met een rotsmoel
2008	Masterworks
2011	Olraait!
2014	Waar is mijn boormasjien
