= Container Cup =

Belgian TV program

- Presenters Pedro Elias and Wesley Sonck
- Genre: Game show, Reality show
- Directed by: Andrew Van Dyck, Jelle Gordyn, Dirk Van den Houte
- Country of origin: Belgium
- Original language: Dutch
- No. of seasons: 3
- No. of episodes: 61

Production
- Running time: 30 minutes

Original release
- Network: Play4
- Release: 26 April 2020 – December 19, 2022

The Container Cup is a TV program developed by Woestijnvis and broadcast by Belgian TV channel Vier. The first season aired between 26 April 2020 and 28 May 2020. In the format, 32 professional sporters had to finish a series of seven sporting events, organised in a container, in the least amount of time. The eventual winner of the first season was Mathieu van der Poel, with Hanne Claes the fastest woman. Some so-called "Famous Flemings" (former sportspeople, TV presenters, ...) also participated.

The concept was created and filmed in less than two months, when all official sporting events were cancelled due to the COVID-19 pandemic.

The seven events were 1500m running, monkey bars, golf, 1000m rowing, shooting, bench press, and 3 km cycling. The time needed for the running, rowing and cycling was added together. The other events resulted in time reduced: one second for each monkey bar, for every three metre on the virtual golf course (best of three attempts), and for every two kilograms on the bench press (best of three attempts), and ten seconds per target hit on the shooting range (for a maximum of five). For these four events there was a time limit as well.

The format was sold to US company 3Ball Productions. It has also been sold to France, and other countries like Germany, the Netherlands, Italy, Spain and the UK have shown interest.

In December 2020 it won the Ha! van Humo as best Flemish television show of the year.

A second season was broadcast in 2021 and won by rower Ward Lemmelijn. A third season, broadcast in 2022, was won by canoeist Artuur Peters.

== Results ==
=== Season 1 ===
==== Overall ====
- 1: Mathieu van der Poel, cyclist: 8 minutes, 50 seconds, 2 hundreds
- 2: Greg Van Avermaet, cyclist: 9 minutes, 20 seconds, 30 hundreds
- 3: Oliver Naesen, cyclist: 9 minutes, 49 seconds, 40 hundreds

Then followed rower Tim Brys, football player Dennis Praet, judoka Dirk Van Tichelt, cyclists Victor Campenaerts, Thibau Nys, and Toon Aerts, and judoka Matthias Casse. The best women were athlete Hanne Claes, cyclist Jolien D'Hoore, and swimmer Fanny Lecluyse.

==== Per event ====
- Running: 1st Dennis Praet, 2nd Thibau Nys and 3rd athlete Dylan Borlée
- Monkey bars: 1st Dirk Van Tichelt and Matthias Casse, and 3rd Mathieu van der Poel
- Golf: 1st hockey player Arthur Van Doren, 2nd Dennis Praet, and 3rd athlete Jonathan Borlée
- Rowing: 1st Tim Brys, 2nd cyclist Wout Van Aert, and 3rd Matthias Casse
- Shooting: 1st Dirk Van Tichelt, and 2nd Jolien D'Hoore and Victor Campenaerts,
- Bench press: 1st Matthias Casse, 2nd Dirk Van Tichelt, and 3rd hockey player Thomas Briels and athlete Kevin Borlée
- Cycling: 1st Wout Van Aert, 2nd Mathieu van der Poel, and 3rd speed skater Bart Swings

=== Season 2 ===
==== Overall ====
- 1: Ward Lemmelijn, rower: 7 minutes, 59 seconds, 82 hundreds
- 2: Marten Van Riel, triathlete: 8 minutes, 00 seconds, 36 hundreds
- 3: Jorre Verstraeten, judoka: 8 minutes, 07 seconds, 53 hundreds

Then followed gymnast Luka Van den Keybus, rallye driver Thierry Neuville, rugby player Gillian Benoy, boxer Ryad Merhy, basketball player Jean-Marc Mwema, cyclist Tim Declercq, and korfbal player Jarni Amorgaste. The best women were athlete Paulien Couckuyt, cyclist Lotte Kopecky, and boxer Delfine Persoon.

==== Per event ====
- Running: 1st athlete Isaac Kimeli, 2nd Marten van Riel and 3rd Ward Lemmelijn
- Monkey bars: 1st Luka Van den Keybus, 2nd breaker Maxime Blieck and 3rd Delfine Persoon
- Golf: 1st golfer Thomas Pieters, 2nd hockey player Alexander Hendrickx and 3rd Gillian Benoy
- Rowing: 1st Ward Lemmelijn, 2nd Thomas Pieters and 3rd Thierry Neuville
- Shooting: 1st racing driver Stoffel Vandoorne, Pauline Couckuyt, kayaker Lize Broekx, and badminton player Lianne Tan
- Bench press: 1st Ward Lemmelijn, 2nd Ryad Merhy and 3rd Gillian Benoy
- Cycling: 1st Ward Lemmelijn, 2nd volleyball player Hendrik Tuerlinckx and 3rd Tim Declercq
