= Wesley Sonck =

Belgian footballer (born 1978)

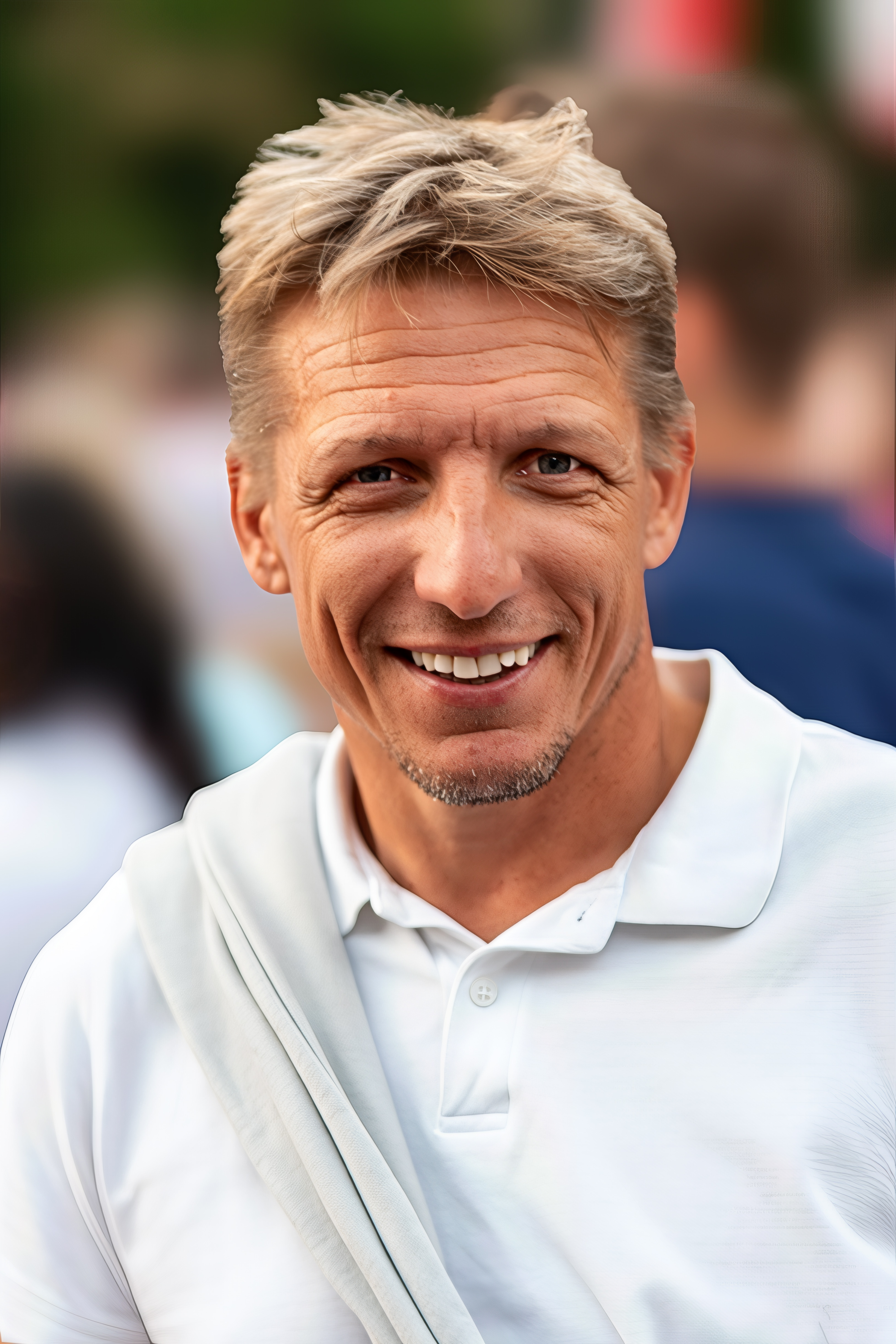
- Sonck pictured in 2025

Personal information
- Date of birth: 9 August 1978 (age 48)
- Place of birth: Ninove, Belgium
- Height: 1.74 m (5 ft 9 in)
- Position: Striker

Team information
- Current team: Belgium U19 (manager)

Senior career*
Years	Team	Apps	(Gls)
1994–1998	Molenbeek	33	(11)
1998–1999	Germinal Ekeren	32	(7)
1999–2000	Germinal Beerschot	28	(11)
2000–2003	Genk	93	(66)
2003–2005	Ajax	34	(10)
2005–2008	Borussia Mönchengladbach	28	(6)
2007–2008	→ Club Brugge (loan)	21	(6)
2008–2010	Club Brugge	50	(21)
2010–2012	Lierse	32	(6)
2012–2013	Waasland-Beveren	16	(1)
2014	KE Appelterre-Eichem	9	(9)
Total		376	(154)

International career
1996	Belgium U18	4	(1)
1997–1999	Belgium U21	11	(8)
2001–2010	Belgium	55	(24)

Managerial career
- 2017–2020: Belgium U18
- 2020–2024: Belgium U19
- * Club domestic league appearances and goals

Wesley Sonck (born 9 August 1978) is a Belgian professional football manager and former player who manages the Belgium U19 national team. He played as a striker for Molenbeek, Ninove, Germinal Ekeren, Germinal Beerschot, Genk, Ajax, Borussia Mönchengladbach and Club Brugge. He was capped by Belgium at international level.

During his time with Genk, he was the top goalscorer in the Belgian First Division in the 2001–02 season with 30 goals, and joint top in the following campaign with 22 – sharing the award with Cédric Roussel.

== Club career ==
=== Ajax ===
Sonck moved to Ajax in the summer of 2003, to replace departed striker Mido. He made his debut on 12 August against Grazer AK. He scored his first goal for the club 13 September against RKC Waalwijk. Sonck never really made it in Amsterdam, partly because he was playing on the right wing a lot under coach Ronald Koeman. He moved to Borussia Mönchengladbach in the winter of 2004.

=== Borussia Mönchengladbach ===
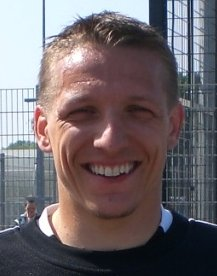
Sonck in 2007 with Borussia Mönchengladbach

Sonck's time with Borussia Mönchengladbach of the Bundesliga was hampered by injuries. Mönchengladbach signed him on a permanent contract, a deal initially arranged already at the start of his loan. In the summer of 2005, Sonck had three of his ribs broken after a horrific tackle by Wilfred Bouma in a goalless, meaningless friendly between Borussia Mönchengladbach and PSV Eindhoven. Sonck took six months to recover, marking his return to competitive football with a goal in a 3–1 defeat by Bayern Munich. He scored three more in 13 further Bundesliga games for Mönchengladbach until he was forced out for three months with an injury in the hollow of his knee at the start of the 2006–07 season.

=== Back to Belgium ===
Sonck left Gladbach at the end of the 2006–07 season, joining Club Brugge on a year-long loan deal while Borussia Mönchengladbach began playing in the second tier of the Bundesliga. Following the 2007–08 season, Sonck joined Brugge permanently for an undisclosed fee. At the end of the 2009–10 season, Sonck left Brugge to join Lierse S.K. on a free transfer having fallen out with manager Adrie Koster over contract negotiations and lack of first team action. Amongst his first goals for the club was an excellent overhead kick. Sonck was released in the summer of 2012 and spent a few months unemployed before joining newly promoted Waasland-Beveren near the end of October 2012. In January 2014 signed with 1ste Provincial Oost-Vlaanderen club KE Appelterre-Eichem, before retiring just three months later.

== International career ==
Wesley Sonck was a member of the Belgian squad at the 2002 FIFA World Cup. He scored one goal in the Group stage match against Russia.

Sonck was called for the Belgium national team during the 2010 World Cup qualifiers. In the match versus Spain he scored Belgium's only goal in that match, thus ending Casillas and Reina's undefeated streak of 710 minutes.

== Coaching career ==
On 3 August 2017, Sonck was hired as manager of the Belgian U18 national team. In March 2020, he was put in charge of the U-19 national team.

== Television career ==
Sonck is a regular football analyst in Belgian TV sport shows and podcasts. In 2020, he made his debut as host of a television program in De Container Cup.

== Career statistics ==
=== Club ===
Appearances and goals by club, season and competition
Club	Season	League			National Cup		Continental		Other		Total	
Club	Season	Division	Apps	Goals	Apps	Goals	Apps	Goals	Apps	Goals	Apps	Goals
Molenbeek	1997–98	Belgian First Division	33	11							33	11
Germinal Ekeren	1998–99	Belgian First Division	32	7			2	1			34	8
Germinal Beerschot	1999–2000	Belgian First Division	29	11	1	0	–		–		30	11
Genk	2000–01	Belgian First Division	32	13	5	4	4	1	1 (Note: Appearance in Belgian Super Cup)	0	42	18
Genk	2001–02	Belgian First Division	32	30	3	2	–		–		35	32
Genk	2002–03	Belgian First Division	29	24	2	3	8	3	1	0	40	30
Genk	Total		93	67	10	9	12	4	2	0	117	80
Ajax	2003–04	Eredivisie	25	9	1	0	7	4	–		33	13
Ajax	2004–05	Eredivisie	9	1	–		4	1	1 (Note: Appearance in Dutch Super Cup)	0	14	2
Ajax	Total		34	10	1	0	11	5	1	0	47	15
Borussia Mönchengladbach	2004–05	Bundesliga	7	2	–		–		–		7	2
Borussia Mönchengladbach	2005–06	Bundesliga	14	4	–		–		–		14	4
Borussia Mönchengladbach	2006–07	Bundesliga	7	0	1	1	–		–		8	1
Borussia Mönchengladbach	Total		28	6	1	1	0	0	0	0	29	7
Club Brugge	2007–08	Belgian First Division	21	6	–		2	0	–		23	6
Club Brugge	2008–09	Belgian First Division	28	14	1	0	6	2	–		35	16
Club Brugge	2009–10	Belgian Pro League	22	7	1	0	7	1	–		30	8
Club Brugge	Total		71	27	2	0	15	3	0	0	88	30
Lierse	2010–11	Belgian Pro League	22	6	3	3	–		–		25	9
Lierse	2011–12	Belgian Pro League	22	2	5	0	–		–		27	2
Lierse	Total		44	8	8	3	0	0	0	0	52	11
Waasland-Beveren	2012–13	Belgian Pro League	23	2	1	0	–		–		24	2
Career total			387	149	24	13	3	0	40	13	454	175

=== International ===
Appearances and goals by national team and year
National team	Year	Apps	Goals
Belgium	2001	7	1
Belgium	2002	13	5
Belgium	2003	8	6
Belgium	2004	6	2
Belgium	2005	0	0
Belgium	2006	3	1
Belgium	2007	2	1
Belgium	2008	8	6
Belgium	2009	7	2
Belgium	2010	1	0
Total		55	24

Scores and results list Belgium's goal tally first, score column indicates score after each Sonck goal.

List of international goals scored by Wesley Sonck
No.	Date	Venue	Opponent	Score	Result	Competition
1	6 June 2001	Stadio Olimpico, Serravalle, San Marino	San Marino	3–1	4–1	2002 World Cup qualification
2	27 March 2002	Olympic Stadium, Athens, Greece	Greece	0-2	2–3	Friendly
3	14 June 2002	Shizuoka Stadium Ecopa, Fukoroi, Japan	Russia	2–1	3–2	2002 World Cup
4	21 August 2002	Florian Kryger Stadium, Szczecin, Poland	Poland	1–1	1–1	Friendly
5	12 October 2002	Estadi Comunal d'Aixovall, Aixovall, Andorra	Andorra	1–0	1–0	Euro 2004 qualification
6	16 October 2002	A. Le Coq Arena, Tallinn, Estonia	Estonia	1–0	1–0	Euro 2004 qualification
7	12 February 2003	Stade 19 Mai 1956, Annaba, Algeria	Algeria	2–0	3–1	Friendly
8	30 April 2003	King Baudouin Stadium, Brussels, Belgium	Poland	1–0	2–1	Friendly
9	11 June 2003	King Baudouin Stadium, Brussels, Belgium	Andorra	2–0	3–0	Euro 2004 qualification
10	20 August 2003	King Baudouin Stadium, Brussels, Belgium	Netherlands	1–0	1–1	Friendly
11	10 September 2003	King Baudouin Stadium, Brussels, Belgium	Croatia	1–0	2–1	Euro 2004 qualification
12	10 September 2003	King Baudouin Stadium, Brussels, Belgium	Croatia	2–1	2–1	Euro 2004 qualification
13	28 April 2004	King Baudouin Stadium, Brussels, Belgium	Turkey	1–0	2–3	Friendly
14	4 September 2004	Stade du Pays de Charleroi, Charleroi, Belgium	Lithuania	1–0	1–1	2006 World Cup qualification1
15	24 May 2006	Cristal Arena, Genk, Belgium	Turkey	2–2	3–3	Friendly
16	17 October 2007	King Baudouin Stadium, Brussels, Belgium	Armenia	1–0	3–0	Euro 2008 qualification
17	30 May 2008	Stadio Artemio Franchi, Florence, Italy	Italy	1–3	1–3	Friendly
18	6 September 2008	Stade Maurice Dufrasne, Liège, Belgium	Estonia	1–0	3–2	2010 World Cup qualification
19	6 September 2008	Stade Maurice Dufrasne, Liège, Belgium	Estonia	3–1	3–2	2010 World Cup qualification
20	10 September 2008	Şükrü Saracoğlu Stadium, Istanbul, Turkey	Turkey	1–0	1–1	2010 World Cup qualification
21	11 October 2008	King Baudouin Stadium, Brussels, Belgium	Armenia	1–0	2–0	2010 World Cup qualification
22	15 October 2008	King Baudouin Stadium, Brussels, Belgium	Spain	1–0	1–2	2010 World Cup qualification
23	28 March 2009	Cristal Arena, Genk, Belgium	Bosnia and Herzegovina	2–4‡	2–4	2010 World Cup qualification
24	17 November 2009	Stade Louis Dugauguez, Sedan, France	Qatar	2–0	2–0	Friendly

Key
‡	Indicates goal was scored from a penalty kick

== Honours and awards ==
Genk

- Belgian First Division: 2001–02

Ajax

- Eredivisie: 2003–04

Individual

- Belgian Golden Shoe: 2001
- Goal of the Season: 2001
- Belgian Professional Footballer of the Year: 2001–02
- Belgian First Division A top scorer: 2001–02 (30 goals), 2002–03 (22 goals)
- Honorary citizen of Ninove: 2021
- Most beautiful goal of all time in the Belgian league: 2023
- Pro League Hall of Fame: 2024
