= Elisa Mouliaá =

Spanish actress (born 1989)

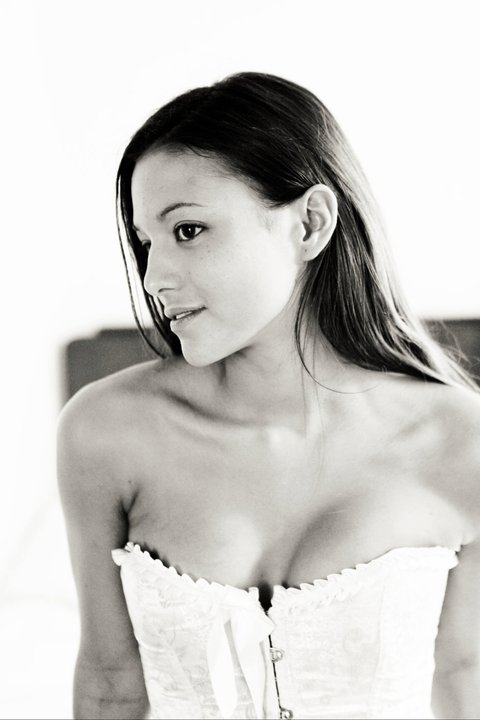
- Born: 7 January 1989 (age 37); Madrid, Spain
- Occupations: Actress and model
- Spouse: Shaun Raymond (m. 2019; div. 2023)
- Children: 1
- Website: www.elisa-mouliaa.com

Elisa Mouliaá Ruiz de Elvira (born in Madrid on 7 January 1989) is a Spanish actress and television host. She is known for having played Irene in Águila Roja, one of the most-watched TV shows in Spain. She studied drama at the International study of actor Juan Carlos Corazza, and has starred in some films, theatre and television shows.

== Personal life ==
Elisa married the Australian Shaun Raymond on July 24, 2019. In April 2020 she had a daughter. They divorced in 2023.

In 2024, Mouliaá filed a sexual assault complaint against Íñigo Errejón, the spokesperson of Sumar in the Congress of Deputies, over an alleged incident in September 2021. This led to Errejón announcing his withdrawal from politics.

== Filmography ==
=== Television ===
Year	Serie	Role	Channel
2006	Génesis: en la mente del asesino ("Genesis: In the Mind of a Murderer")	Raped girl	Cuatro
2007	Círculo rojo ("Red Circle")	Kidnapped girl	Antena3
2007	El Internado ("The Boarding School")	Alicia	Antena3
2009	Cuestión de Sexo ("A Question of Sex")	Silvia	Cuatro
2010–2016	Águila Roja ("Red Eagle")	Irene	La 1
2011	Borgia	Pantasilea	Canal+, Cosmopolitan
2014	De Biker Boys ("The Biker Boys")	Estella	Eén (Belgium)
2015	Rabia	Lola Castro	Cuatro
2015	La Liga Awards	Herself (host)	La 1
2015	Enciende tu Navidad ("Light up your Christmas")	Herself (host)	La 1
2015–2021	TVEmos	Herself (host)	La 1
2016	Buscando el norte ("Searching the North")	Manuela Nogués	Antena3
2016	Olmos y Robles	Nora Salgado	La 1
2017	All you need is love... o no	Herself	Telecinco
2017–2019	Servir y proteger ("To serve and protect")	Lola Ramos	La 1
2019	+Cotas ("+Pets")	Herself (guest)	La 1
2019	Vaya crack ("What a crack")	Herself (guest)	La 1
2019	Hacer de comer	Herself (guest)	La 1
2024	Zapeando	Herself	LaSexta
2024	TardeAR	Herself (guest)	Telecinco
2025	¡De viernes! ("It's friday")	Herself (guest)	Telecinco

=== Film ===
Year	Film	Role	Director
2007	La Possibilité d`une Ile ("The Possibility of an Island")	Cast	Michel Houellebecq
2011	Las Meninas ("The Meninas")	Nerea	Eva Cools
2013	Al Final todos Mueren ("Everybody Dies in the End")	Lara	Javier Fesser, David Galán Galindo
2016	We Are Pregnant	Gloria	Juana Macías
2018	Bernarda	Adela	Emilio Ruiz Barrachina

=== Short films ===
Title	Role	Director	Year
El Resto es Silencio ("The Rest is Silence")	Helena	Pablo Bullejos	2013
We Belong to Death	Elsa	Ángel Gómez Hernández	2012
They·r Broken	Girl	Roberto Pérez-Toledo	2012
Bad Night	Main role	Ainhoa Menéndez Goyoaga	2011
Domingo por la Tarde ("Sunday Afternoon")	Main role	Ana Lambarri	2009
Martina and the Moon	Martina	Javier Loarte	2008

=== Theater ===
Title	Role	Author	Director	Year
¿Por qué Yo? ("Why Me?")	Inma	Belén Verdugo	Belén Verdugo	2013
The Café	Zooey	Kyle Bradstreet	Nacho Aldeguer	2012
La Rosa Tatuada ("The Rose Tattoo")	Rosita	Tennessee Williams	C.Napoleón	2000
La Vida en un Hilo ("Life on a String")	Luisita	Edgar Neville	C.Napoleón	1998

=== Music video ===
Band	Song	Director	Año
Love of Lesbian	Unlived days	Alfonso Cortés	2013
Izal	Your continent	Antonio Blanco	2012
Iván Ferreiro	Lost paradises	Jesús Hernández	2011
Sala&the Strange Sounds	Margot	WeProduceFilms	2011
Carlos Lázaro	Save me from you	Gustavo Ron	2011
Grupo 84	Tribunal	Quique Santamaría	2010

== Awards ==
Category	Festival	Result	Año
Best main actress	Women's Independent Film Festival, West Hollywood	Winner	2013
New Talent	Cine y Mujer Aragonés	winner	2011
Best main actress	Villamayor de Santiago	nominated	2010
