= The Loft (film) =

2014 film by Erik Van Looy

- Theatrical release poster
- Directed by: Erik Van Looy
- Screenplay by: Bart De Pauw; Wesley Strick
- Story by: Bart De Pauw
- Based on: Loft by: Erik Van Looy; Bart De Pauw
- Produced by: Hilde De Laere; Matt DeRoss; Paul Green; Adam Shulman
- Starring: Karl Urban; James Marsden; Wentworth Miller; Eric Stonestreet; Matthias Schoenaerts; Isabel Lucas; Rachael Taylor
- Cinematography: Nicolas Karakatsanis
- Edited by: Eddie Hamilton
- Music by: John Frizzell
- Production companies: Woestijnvis; Anonymous Content
- Distributed by: Open Road Films (United States); Kinepolis Film Distribution (Belgium)
- Release dates: October 14, 2014 (Ghent); October 15, 2014 (Belgium); January 30, 2015 (United States)
- Running time: 103 minutes
- Countries: United States; Belgium
- Language: English
- Budget: $13 million
- Box office: $11 million

The Loft is a 2014 erotic thriller film directed by Erik Van Looy. It is a remake of the 2008 Dutch-language Belgian film Loft, which Van Looy also directed. The screenplay was written by Bart De Pauw and adapted by Wesley Strick. Starring Karl Urban, James Marsden, and Wentworth Miller, it also features Matthias Schoenaerts, who reprises his role from the original film.

The film was shot in mid-2011, but its theatrical release was delayed by a change of the film distributor. Dark Castle Entertainment originally acquired the US distribution rights, as they did for Splice, with the intention of releasing the film through Warner Bros. When Joel Silver moved his office to Universal Studios, he took Dark Castle, and the film with him. Universal planned to release the film on August 29, 2014, but the studio pulled it from the schedule in favor of Legendary Pictures' As Above, So Below. Universal and Dark Castle dropped the film, which was then picked up by Open Road Films, who released it on January 30, 2015. Universal retained the US home entertainment rights through its ancillaries deal with Open Road. Dark Castle did not release another film until 2017's Suburbicon with Paramount Pictures.

== Plot ==
Five married men share ownership of an upmarket loft, which they use for discreetly meeting their respective mistresses. When the body of a murdered woman Sarah Deakins is found in that loft, the men begin to suspect each other of having committed the gruesome crime, as they are the only ones with keys to the premises. Through flashbacks, which are intertwined with scenes from the present, the story is unravelled.

The five men are:

- Vincent Stevens: architect and designer of the building where the loft is situated. Married to Barbara and father of their children, he initially suggests the five friends use the loft as a private oasis. He is set up by the other men to be accused of the murder.
- Dr. Chris Vanowen: a psychiatrist married to Allison and the elder maternal half-brother to siblings Philip and Zoe. He is the most reluctant of the men to the loft idea and the last to accept a key; Chris eventually does so because he is attracted to Anne, who eventually becomes his mistress. Anne warns Chris not to fall in love with her because she is a prostitute, and he gives her his key as proof he does not use the loft with other women.
- Luke Seacord: married to Ellie, who is an insulin-dependent diabetic. He discovers the body in the loft and initially calls Vincent and the others over. The police later insinuate that Luke is attracted to Vincent, and it is Luke who records the men's activities in the loft without their knowledge.
- Marty Landry: heavy drinker and a conspicuous lecher. He and his wife Mimi separate when a woman Marty slept with on a business trip shows up at their house.
- Philip Trauner: half-brother to Chris and recently married to Vicky, the only daughter of a wealthy property developer who is also Philip’s boss. Philip is a drug user who grew up in a dysfunctional household with his abusive father and is very protective of his younger sister Zoe. He warns the other men off from having sex with her.

== Cast ==
- Karl Urban as Vincent Stevens
- James Marsden as Chris Vanowen
- Wentworth Miller as Luke Seacord
- Eric Stonestreet as Marty Landry
- Matthias Schoenaerts as Philip Trauner
- Rhona Mitra as Alison Vanowen
- Rachael Taylor as Anne Morris
- Isabel Lucas as Sarah Deakins
- Valerie Cruz as Barbara Stevens
- Elaine Cassidy as Ellie Seacord
- Kali Rocha as Mimi Landry
- Margarita Levieva as Vicky Fry
- Madison Burge as Zoe Trauner
- Kristin Lehman as Detective Huggins
- Robert Wisdom as Detective Cohagan
- Ric Reitz as Joel Kotkin
- Graham Beckel as Hiram Fry
- Kathy Deitch as Dana
- Griff Furst as Zoe's Friend
- Eric Dickinson as Zoe's Friend

== Production ==
On June 6, 2011, principal photography began in New Orleans. After a few weeks, filming moved to the studios in Brussels, Belgium. Production wrapped up on July 27, 2011.

== Release ==
After several delays, Open Road finally released The Loft on January 30, 2015, in the United States, with a wide release in 1,841 screens.

== Reception ==
On the review aggregator website Rotten Tomatoes, the film holds an approval rating of 14% based on 42 reviews, with an average rating of 3.1/10. The website's critics consensus reads, "Populated with characters as unpleasant as its sleazy storyline, The Loft is uninhabitable for all but the least demanding erotic thriller fans." On Metacritic, the film has a score of 24 out of 100 based on 11 critics, indicating "generally unfavorable reviews". Audiences polled by CinemaScore gave the film a grade of "B−" on an A+ to F scale.

J.R. Jones of the Chicago Reader wrote: "The twisty plot translates to any culture where swinging-dick businessmen cheat on their wives — which is to say, any culture." Jim Lane of the Sacramento News & Review wrote that "the solution is both simple and complicated, and quite satisfying". Jason Best of Movie Talk writes: "The plotting gets too clever by half towards the end, but with striking support from Rachael Taylor and Isabel Lucas this remains a slick and stylish whodunit." Frank Scheck of The Hollywood Reporter praised the cinematography and said that "the film could well serve to encourage both extramarital affairs and the sale of upscale loft apartments". Joe Leydon for Variety writes: "Still, there can be no denying the interest and suspense Van Looy and scripter Wesley Strick generate during the opening scenes as they set the plot mechanics into motion." Roger Moore for Tribune News Service called the film well-cast and said that Schoenaerts "provides some fireworks and the old-fashioned theatricality of it might appeal to some — even Hitchcock himself".

=== Box office ===
The Loft grossed $6 million in the United States and $5 million in other territories for a worldwide total of $11 million.
