= We Are Pregnant =

- Theatrical release poster
- Spanish: Embarazados
- Directed by: Juana Macías
- Screenplay by: Juana Macías; Anna R. Costa; Juan Moreno
- Produced by: Juan Moreno; Guillermo Sempere
- Starring: Paco León; Alexandra Jiménez; Alberto Amarilla; Ernesto Sevilla; Goizalde Núñez; Elisa Mouliaá; Ainhoa Aierbe; Iñaki Font; Belén López; Karra Elejalde
- Cinematography: Guillermo Sempere
- Edited by: Juana Macías; María Macías
- Music by: Pascal Gaigne
- Production companies: Teoponte PC; Audiovisuales del Monte; Kowalski Films; Teléfonica Studios; Lanube Películas
- Distributed by: Buena Vista International
- Release date: 29 January 2016
- Country: Spain
- Language: Spanish

We Are Pregnant (Spanish: Embarazados) is a 2016 Spanish comedy film directed by Juana Macías from a screenplay by Macías, Anna R. Costa and Juan Moreno starring Paco León and Alexandra Jiménez.

== Plot ==
The plot follows the mishaps of the couple close to their 40s formed by Alina (a woman in a pre-menopausal stage wanting to have a child) and Fran (a man with poor semen quality) as they embark into a process of in vitro fertilisation.

== Cast ==
- Alexandra Jiménez as Alina
- Paco León as Fran
- Alberto Amarilla as Guillermo
- Ernesto Sevilla
- Elisa Mouliaá as Gloria
- Iñaki Font as Koldo
- Ainhoa Aierbe as Alma
- Belén López as Teresa
- Goizalde Núñez as Verónica
- Karra Elejalde as ginecólogo ('gynaecologist')

== Production ==
The film was produced by Audiovisuales del Monte, Teoponte PC, Kowalski Films and Telefónica Studios and it had the participation of TVE, ETB, and Movistar+. It boasted a budget of around €1.8 million. Shooting locations included San Sebastián and Madrid.

== Release ==
Distributed by Buena Vista International, the film was released theatrically in Spain on 29 January 2016.

== Reception ==
Beatriz Martínez of Fotogramas rated the film 3 out of 5 stars, deeming it to be an "incisive dissection of couple problems" and singling out Alexandra Jiménez as the best thing about it.

Andrea G. Bermejo of Cinemanía rated the film 3½ out of 5 stars, deeming it to be a comedy with "a bitter aftertaste" in the verdict.

Javier Ocaña of El País considered that the film "finds its best moments in drama" rather than in the inane drivel.

== See also ==
- List of Spanish films of 2016
