= Het Leugenpaleis =

- 1993 compilation album cover
- Genre: Comedy radio/ Sketch radio
- Running time: 1 hour. (12:00 pm – 1:00 pm)
- Country of origin: Belgium
- Language: Dutch
- Home station: Studio Brussel
- TV adaptations: Het Peulengaleis.
- Starring: Bart Peeters, Hugo Matthysen
- Original release: 1988 – 1999

Het Leugenpaleis (English: The Palace of Lies) was a Flemish (Belgian) radio sketch comedy show by Hugo Matthysen and Bart Peeters, presented from 1988 until 1999 on radio station Studio Brussel. At the time it enjoyed a huge cult following.

The absurd comedy show proved popular enough to inspire two television spin-offs, "De Liegende Doos" (1995) and "Het Peulengaleis" (1999-2005).

== Concept ==
"Het Leugenpaleis" was a completely improvised radio sketch show, presented by TV presenter Bart Peeters and writer Hugo Matthysen. Most of the comedy came from the hosts playing bizarre and silly characters who reappeared in every episode. The nonsensical atmosphere was highlighted by the fact that both Peeters and Matthysen often starting corpsing, sometimes to the point that they were unable to continue for a few minutes.

Each episode closed with The Great Gig in the Sky by Pink Floyd and Lara's Theme by Maurice Jarre.

=== Characters ===
The show had a series of memorable characters, some of which were also used in the TV show adaptations. Apart from these recurring characters Peeters and Matthysen also enjoyed playing fictitious versions of real-life Flemish celebrities, such as The Paranoiacs, Daan Stuyven, Stef Kamil Carlens, Cas Goossens, Mark Coenen, Kathleen Cools and cardinal Godfried Danneels. They usually didn't bother with the accent or any sense of reality at all.

Character name	Played by	Notes
Kim De Hert ("Kim the deer")	Hugo Matthysen	A deer who was made into a hunter's trophy and apparently appeared in the studio as nothing more but a head stuck on a piece of wood. He always claimed to be from a mansion in 's-Gravenwezel. Peeters and Matthysen used him as a mascot for the series.
Jefke De Lathouwer	Hugo Matthysen	A gnome who talked about his pubic hair.
Dokter De Reiger	Hugo Matthysen	A rich physician from Oostrozebeke.
Arne Faes	Bart Peeters	A stereotypically gay association football fan who enjoyed talking about all the players "who could get him if they wanted."
Cas Goossens	Bart Peeters	A fictitious version of the head of the BRT between 1986 and 1996. He usually appeared at the end of each episode, where Matthysen visited him in his office while he was "making sure all his documents were in check for Monday morning." Peeters played him as a very enthusiastic old man who talked in Antwerp dialect. While talking to Matthysen he always referred to him as "Matthysens". He sometimes aired segments from a show he maded in the 1950s with Eugène Flagey, called "De Floeren Portemonnee" ("The Velours Wallet"). The character was mostly a parody of 1950s presenters. In Het Peulengaleis Peeters portrayed Jos Bosmans, who - despite a different name, hair style and costume - is exactly the same character.
Linda Kelchtermans	Played by Bart Peeters' wife.	A quiz candidate from Deurne who always lost.
Notaris X.	?	A notary from Kruishoutem, whose name was a reference to a real-life notary who was suspected to have sexually molested his children in the late 1980s. The case was later revealed to be false.
Clement Peerens	Hugo Matthysen	A self-declared rock 'n' roll specialist from Antwerp, who talks in the local dialect. He is a complete macho. In 1991 this character inspired the rock parody act The Clement Peerens Explosition, with Matthysen as the lead singer.
Joe Roxy	Bart Peeters	A poet from Limburg who recited erotic poems, but was more concerned about being paid back for his transport.
Magda van Damme	Hugo Matthysen	A house wife from Schelle.
Xavier Van den Arend	Bart Peeters	A Native American who often talked about famous Flemish media people in stereotypical Native American names.
Nonkel van Grauwel ("Uncle van Grauwel").	Bart Peeters	An uncle who claimed to be a friend of all children and always spoke in a deep, growling voice. He was a parody of TV host Bob Davidse, best known as the friendly TV presenter "Nonkel Bob" ("Uncle Bob").
Urbaan Van Praet	Stijn Peeters, who is Bart Peeters' brother.	A man from the Kiliaanstraat in Duffel who always acted as if he was a famous celebrity.

== History ==
"Het Leugenpaleis" aired on Studio Brussel from 1988 to 1999. Right from the start it divided listeners in two camps: you either loved it or hated it. Peeters and Matthysen's unprofessional attitude often caused them to start laughing halfway their performances or made skits go on for so long that the musical interludes had to wait. Originally radio network chief Jan Schoukens planned to fire them, but since the airings had garnered a cult following by then the show was allowed to stay in the air.

In 1989 the show won the HA! van Humo, an annual prize for best Flemish TV show, awarded by the Flemish magazine Humo. It is still the only radio show so far to be awarded this TV prize.

The show ended in 1999, but in 2005 it returned for one final episode to celebrate the 75th anniversary of Belgian radio.

== Television adaptations ==
In 1993 Bart Peeters appeared in Mark Uytterhoeven's popular TV talk show "Morgen Maandag", where he played BRTN network head Cas Goossens, whom he had imitated a lot in "Het Leugenpaleis". It was one of the most memorable moments of the show.

=== De (V)liegende doos ===
In 1995 Peeters and Matthysen tried to transfer the absurd Leugenpaleis comedy to television. Since the BRTN refused to give them their own show at the time they broadcast the format on the commercial network vtm. The shows, "De Vliegende Doos" and "De Liegende Doos" ("The Flying Box" and "The Lying Box") were broadcast in prime time at Sunday evenings. "De Vliegende Doos" was a big budget comedy musical spectacle show aimed at a family audience, with puppets and Ronny Mosuse playing an African warrior. "De Liegende Doos" was broadcast later at night and more adult in style. Both programs went live and were completely improvised. While the shows received a lot of media attention at the time the format didn't really catch on with the general public. "De Vliegende Doos" was perceived to be too infantile. "De Liegende Doos", which was more in line with the madcap style of the radio show, got a better reception, but was still too daft for the average viewer. Still, "De Vliegende Doos" was shown in repeats during vtm and its sister channel 2BE's matinée hours and a CD with music from the show was released later.

=== Het Peulengaleis ===
Four years later Peeters and Matthysen returned to the small screen with "Het Peulengaleis", a switcheroo of the radio show's title. This time the VRT did give them a chance to make a TV version of "Het Leugenpaleis" and it aired on Canvas late at night. Each episode was directed by Stijn Coninx and featured, apart from Peeters and Matthysen, guest actors among which Tine Embrechts was the most prominent.

The show was smaller in budget and pretense and reached its target audience much easier. It was an instant hit and popular enough to inspire six TV seasons.

== Availability ==
In the 1980s and 1990s memorable moments from the radio show were compiled on cassette tapes and CDs. In 2006 a double compilation CD was released.

== In popular culture ==
The Belgian comedy rock band The Clement Peerens Explosition is based on the character Clement Peerens. The band stars Hugo Matthysen as the character, with Bart Peeters and Ronny Mosuse as fellow band members.

A restaurant in Sint Niklaas was named after the show.

In 2007 the Leugenpaleis sketch "De Floeren Portemonee" was elected as the funniest radio comedy moment in Flemish radio history in a poll held by Radio 1.
