= Schalkse Ruiters =

- Series banner with Tom Lenaerts and Bart De Pauw
- Genre: Talk show, Game show, Comedy show, Sketch show, Mockumentary
- Created by: Bart De Pauw, Tom Lenaerts, Michiel Devlieger
- Opening theme: Flight of the Intruder (Basil Poledouris)
- Ending theme: Flight of the Intruder (Basil Poledouris)
- Country of origin: Belgium
- Original language: Dutch
- No. of seasons: 2
- No. of episodes: 23

Production
- Running time: 2 hours

Original release
- Network: VRT
- Release: 8 December 1996 – February 1998

Schalkse Ruiters, translated as "Roguish Horsemen", was a Flemish humoristic TV talk and game show, broadcast on the TV channel Eén between late 1996 and early 1998. The program was a cross between a comedy show, a talk show, a game show and a mockumentary. Hosted by Bart De Pauw and Tom Lenaerts viewers were shown three video reports about three different topics. The people in the studio and viewers at home had to vote whether they believed each individual video to be real or staged. In between these reports hidden camera segments and comedy sketches were shown.

At the time Schalkse Ruiters was notorious for their sensational reports, unpredictable atmosphere, and enjoyable comedy. The final episode of the first season, when managing director of the Vlaamse Radio-en Televisieomroep (Flemish Public Radio and Television) Bert De Graeve was their guest, was watched by 2.166 million people. A ratings record that stood for decades, until it was surpassed by De Slimste Mens ter Wereld in 2012. The second season continued the high ratings. Schalkse Ruiters made Bart De Pauw, Tom Lenaerts, Michiel Devlieger, and the comedy character de Man van Melle (The Man from Melle) famous to a huge audience.

== Concept ==
The show also started with images of De Pauw and Lenaerts riding horses through a green field while soundtrack music from the film Flight of the Intruder by Basil Poledouris was playing. As they enter a peasant's village they are cheered as heroes. In the second season a similar intro was used, but set at the beach.

Schalkse Ruiters worked from the principle that viewers shouldn't always believe everything they see on television to be real. That's why each episode showed three reports about which their special guest, the studio audience and the viewers at home had to guess whether they were real or fake. The studio audience (named Klein Vlaanderen (Small Flanders) by them always received a few seconds time to vote. When the time was up the hosts instantly checked how many of them had voted "true" or "not true". The show was broadcast every Sunday evening and had a different special guest each episode. His or her identity was kept a secret until the broadcast itself.

In between the reports De Pauw and Lenaerts made jokes and showed sketch movies starring themselves. They often poked fun at the central host by showing archiving footage or hidden camera footage. Once again real footage was mixed in with staged footage.

Whether the reports were real or not was only announced in the second part of the show. The first part was broadcast between 20.30 h and 21.30 h. Afterwards an episode of the police TV series Heterdaad was broadcast. When this was over, usually around 22.30h, the second part followed in which the correct answers were announced and which viewer at home won the full-screen television set that episode.

Sometimes viewers at home where asked to contribute something for the next episode. Usually these actions were part of a segment called Red Michiel (Save Michiel), named after Michiel Devlieger, the man whom De Pauw and Lenaerts usually used for these viewers' requests. The segment made its debut in the third episode of the first season.

== History ==
Schalkse Ruiters started in December 1996 on TV1 (nowadays Eén) and starred Bart De Pauw and Tom Lenaerts as hosts. Originally Mark Uytterhoeven was set out to be one of the co-hosts, but he backed off again at the last moment. De Pauw was a well known media star to certain audiences as actor and scriptwriter of the comedy series Buiten De Zone (1994-1996), while Lenaerts was well known since Uytterhoeven's improvisation show Onvoorziene Omstandigheden (1994). Since both men were relatively unknown TV stars Schalkse Ruiters only reached a small number of viewers.

It wasn't until after the second episode when the show grew out to be a hype. During the third report both hosts had managed to illegally get across all security controls of the Belgian airport Zaventem by using fake uniforms, forged badges and even sat in the cockpit of a Boeing before eventually sneaking out the airport again without anyone noticing something strange. The next day this broadcast was a huge media event and even made the news. It generated a huge discussion about the safety of the national airport. All this publicity caused their viewership to skyrocket, never to leave them again. By the time the first season ended, in March 1997, a second season became much-requested. It eventually was broadcast between 7 December 1997 until February 1998 to the same high ratings.

== Running gags ==
The show had numerous running gags, of which the Man van Melle was the most well known. This was a character played by De Pauw who wore a curly wig, fake moustache and a raincoat. He always appeared at least once in one sketch of every episode, where he always tried to get attention and begged attractive women to write him since he was "so lonely". He always concluded by naming his address, the Koekoekstraat nr. 70 in Melle. Melle is a real Flemish village, but there was no street of that name when the series was broadcast. At a certain point the city council decided to name one of their new streets Koekoekstraat and painted a door with house number 70 on the wall. In the 10th episode of the first season the Man van Melle interviewed Pamela Anderson.

== Stunts ==
- Lenaerts and De Pauw tried to convince Bert De Graeve, then Vice-President of VRT, to appear as guest in their show. This was a running gag from the very first episode. In the penultimate episode of the first season they asked their viewers to hang banners, signs, logos and all kinds of other ways to get De Graeve's attention and convince him to appear in their show. Within that very week the slogan could be read anywhere, even on streetcars and buses. Eventually De Graeve did turn up in the final episode of that season, broadcast on 2 March 1997, breaking TV ratings records.
- Association football player Franky Van der Elst won the Belgian Golden Shoe in 1996. But it the object was stolen from his house and in an interview he insinuated that Schalkse Ruiters may have stolen it. At first De Pauw and Lenaerts denied this, but during the seventh episode of the first season the camera zoomed behind their desk and revealed that the award was indeed stolen by them, but with Van der Elst being in on the stunt.
- During the tenth episode of the first season De Pauw and Lenaerts alluded that they might have won the TV award Gouden Oog, which had been organized on rival channel vtm the evening before, but was only broadcast one day later, during their TV show. During one of the voting rounds the camera zoomed behind their desk to reveal that both awards were indeed there. This was all minutes before this was announced during the Gouden Oog broadcast on vtm.
- During the final episode of the first season it was revealed that De Pauw and Lenaerts had sung the lyrics to the pop song "Ogen Zo Groen" by the band B-Boys, while the artists themselves merely playbacked. This made audiences far more interested in the song than they had been before.
- A few months before the second season De Pauw and Lenaerts once again made news headlines. They had been caught making a TV commercial for the Belgian beer brand Stella Artois which was broadcast on vtm. The commercial showed two Russian sailors leaving their ship and being brought to a pub where they are greeted with two pints of beer. The sailors were in fact De Pauw and Lenaerts in disguise and their "Russian" was in fact Dutch, but played in reverse. When played in normal conditions their entire dialogue was in fact a hidden message where they revealed who they really were and asked viewers to watch Schalkse Ruiters. VTM had no idea of this stunt and when they found out it was a hoax the commercial was instantly pulled from the air again. De Pauw and Lenaerts had intended this commercial to be broadcast during the first episode of their next season, when the head of vtm, Mike Verdrengh, would be their special guest. Months later during that episode Verdrengh was indeed their guest and they admitted that they had been caught. After showing the clip to the viewers again, De Pauw joked that they had other hidden commercials too, but this was merely a parody of a popular Coca-Cola commercial starring the Man Van Melle instead of an attractive Coca-Cola delivery boy.
- In the third episode of the second season an unknown Flemish man was invited as their co-host, instead of a famous one: Luc Vande Walle. He was selected through a broadcast of the radio show Hallo Hautekiet.

== Awards ==
Schalkse Ruiters won Humo's Prijs van de Kijker both in 1996 and 1997. In 1997 it was also awarded De HA! van Humo, along with Terug naar Oosterdonk.

== Dutch remake ==
In 1998 Dutch TV channel RTL 4 created a Dutch TV remake starring Bas van Werven and Romel van Tiel, but was no huge success. De Pauw and Lenaerts claimed it copied their format too closely, down to the colour of their sweaters. Another remake, De Firma List & Bedrog, was hosted by Irene Moors a few years later.

== Sequel ==
In the spring of 2001 De Pauw and Lenaerts returned with a new comedic talk show named Mannen op de Rand van een Zenuwinzinking. The show had a different concept and talked about how men could please women nowadays. Although it wasn't announced as a sequel to Schalkse Ruiters many viewers still regarded it as such, merely because it was hosted on Sunday evenings again and hosted by De Pauw and Lenaerts again in a somewhat similar TV studio with sketches and hidden camera reports. Archive footage from this show is still often confused with that from Schalkse Ruiters.
