= Ha! van Humo =

Annual TV show award

The Ha! van Humo is a yearly award offered since 1980 by the Flemish magazine Humo to the best television show of the year. The winner, chosen from 10 nominees, receives 5,000 Euro and a sculpted "H". In the first years, the show has also been given a few times to a TV maker and to a radio show instead of a television show. In 1997 and 2014 there were 2 winners, in 2012 no award was presented.

== Palmares ==
| Year | Winner | Channel |
|---|---|---|
| 1980 | Hitring | Eén |
| 1981 | Celluloid rock | Eén |
| 1982 | De nieuwe orde | Eén |
| 1983 | Elektron | Eén |
| 1984 | Fred Brouwers | |
| 1985 | Soldaten in de Grote Oorlog | Eén |
| 1986 | Argus | Eén |
| 1987 | Bavo Claes | |
| 1988 | De tijd der vergelding | Eén |
| 1989 | Het Leugenpaleis | Studio Brussel |
| 1990 | Mark Uytterhoeven | |
| 1991 | Het huis van wantrouwen | Eén |
| 1992 | NV de wereld | Eén |
| 1993 | Moeder, waarom leven wij? | VTM |
| 1994 | Terzake | Canvas |
| 1995 | Rock Rapport | VTM 2 |
| 1996 | Buiten De Zone | Eén |
| 1997 | Schalkse Ruiters | Eén |
| 1997 | Terug naar Oosterdonk | Canvas |
| 1998 | Het leven zoals het is: camping | Eén |
| 1999 | Alles Kan Beter | Canvas |
| 2000 | In de gloria | Canvas |
| 2001 | Phara de Aguirre | |
| 2002 | Het Peulengaleis | Canvas |
| 2003 | Zalm voor Corleone | Canvas |
| 2004 | Het geslacht De Pauw | Eén |
| 2005 | Het eiland | Eén |
| 2006 | Terug naar Siberië | Eén |
| 2007 | Man bijt hond | Eén |
| 2008 | Matroesjka's | VTM |
| 2009 | Van Vlees en Bloed | Eén |
| 2010 | De school van Lukaku | Eén |
| 2011 | Basta | Eén |
| 2012 | No award | |
| 2013 | Safety first | VTM |
| 2014 | 2013 | Vier |
| 2014 | De Ideale Wereld | VIER |
| 2015 | Bevergem | Canvas |
| 2016 | Een kwestie van geluk | Eén |
| 2017 | Goed volk | Eén |
| 2018 | Taboe | Eén |
| 2019 | Terug naar Rwanda | Canvas |
| 2020 | Container Cup | VIER |
