= Buiten De Zone =

Flemish humoristic-satirical TV series

- Genre: Sketch show, satire, teen sitcom
- Created by: Bart De Pauw
- Directed by: Luc Coghe
- Opening theme: "The Mighty Ship" (The Housemartins)
- Ending theme: "Kicking J.T.'s Butt" (Randy Edelman, lifted from the soundtrack of My Cousin Vinny (1992))
- Country of origin: Belgium
- Original language: Dutch
- No. of seasons: 2

Production
- Producer: Wim Vanseveren
- Running time: 30 minutes

Original release
- Network: VRT
- Release: 28 January 1994 – 5 April 1996

Buiten De Zone (English translation: Outside The Zone) was a 1994–1996 Flemish humoristic-satirical TV series aimed at a teenage demographic. It was a combination of a sitcom and a sketch show and was broadcast on the Flemish public TV channel TV1. It gained a cult status and has been rerun several times since. The show was furthermore important for launching the notability of TV host Bart De Pauw, who both co-wrote and acted in the series.

== Concept ==
Buiten De Zone is set at a call center named De Jongerenfoon (The Young Adult Phone), where five young adults have to take calls to help out teenagers and tweens with questions and problems. Three of them are men, Raf Willems, Ubi Stevens and Robin Laureys and two are women, Merel Van Outrive and Roxanne Seynaeve. Since the quintet are still very young themselves they are generally bored with taking the calls, particularly since the few people who phone them just make prank calls. Most of the time they either just talk with one another, practice hobbies or daydream. These daydreams are used as cut-aways to absurd comedic sketches.

The series ran for two seasons, the first one broadcast in 1994, the other in 1996. Each episode is built around a thematic concept. Much of the comedy was subversive and dealt with anarchic jokes about religion, education, teenage life and sex, along with historic-cultural references. The show also had a wide variety of running gags and catch phrases.

== Cast ==
The show was the brainchild of Bart De Pauw, Danny Timmermans, Pietje Horsten, Ief Stuyvaert, and Tom Lenaerts, who all co-wrote each episode.

- Bart De Pauw - Raf Willems
- Mathias Sercu - Ubi Stevens
- Danny Timmermans - Robin Laureys
- Reinhilde Van Driel - Merel Van Outrive
- Elise Bundervoet - Roxanne Seynaeve

Various celebrity TV actors also had cameos in the series.

== Cultural impact ==
Buiten De Zone originally was not a huge success, mostly since none of the cast were well known actors at the time. Apart from that the series was also advertised as a show aimed at youngsters, which already gave many potential viewers the wrong impression that it was a child-oriented series. Since the series was cast on Friday evenings, after 22.00 p.m., it did not reach its target demographic either, since many young people went to parties at that moment. Slowly but surely it started to gain a cult following, which grew as the second season was broadcast. De Pauw attributed this to the fact that the second series was much better and tighter written. Buiten De Zone now won the TV awards Best National TV Show 1996 and the HA! van Humo from the magazine Humo. It also won silver at the Golden Rose of Montreux festival. In 1996–1998 Bart De Pauw and Tom Lenaerts became media superstars thanks to another TV show, Schalkse Ruiters, which made rebroadcasts of Buiten De Zone gain a much wider audience than ever before.

In 2010 the entire series was released on DVD. The reason it had taken this long had to do with the fact that De Pauw often used film soundtrack music as atmospheric background music, which made copyright issues unavoidable.
