= Hoe?Zo! =

Scientific television program

Hoe?Zo! was a popular scientific television show aired from 2003 to 2009 on Teleac/NOT (Nederland 1). The program was originally Flemish and was hosted by Bart Peeters. The show was aired first on Flemish television (VRT-Een), and later in the Netherlands only. The show made it to the 4th place of most watched TV show in the Netherlands reaching an audience of 1.053.000 on August 25, 2009.

== Game course ==
In this show two candidates (celebrities) have to compete and answer multiple scientific questions. In each episode there are 9 questions. With almost each question an experiment is held to figure out the answer. These experiments are held in the studios (Technopolis in Belgium, NEMO in the Netherlands). The first eight questions are equal to one point each. The last one five points. The winner is the one with the most points and he or she wins a brain modeled in platinum for the Netherlands version and a golden brain for the Belgian version. The loser has to offer his body to science by participating at a hard and tough challenge.

== Categories ==
The questions are divided in 3 categories:

- Physics & Techniques
- Biology & Nature
- Psychology & Behavior

== Experts ==
After every question is answered by a contenstant, an expert in the field that reveals the correct answer and explains the subject at hand.

In Belgium:

- Biology & Nature: Ann Van Der Auweraert
- Physics & Techniques: Floris Wuyts
- Psychology & Behavior: Vincent Martin

In the Netherlands:

- Biology & Nature: Bas Defize and Louise Vet
- Physics & Techniques: Hester Bijl and Robbert Dijkgraaf
- Psychology & Behavior: Wop Rietveld and Frans Verstraten

These experts performed these experiments in front of the candidates. In each episode three of the six experts are present, one for each category.
