= De Biker Boys =

- DVD cover of the series
- Genre: Mockumentary
- Created by: Bart De Pauw
- Starring: Bart De Pauw; Jonas Van Geel; Ben Segers; Umesh Vangaver
- Country of origin: Belgium
- Original language: Dutch
- No. of seasons: 1

Production
- Running time: 45 minutes
- Production company: Koeken Troef

Original release
- Network: Eén (Belgium)
- Release: December 21, 2014

De Biker Boys is a comical mockumentary, broadcast in 2014 by the Belgian public broadcasting company Eén and produced by Koeken Troef.

== Story ==
Three well known Flemish television stars (Bart De Pauw, Ben Segers and Jonas Van Geel) intend to make a travel program in search of the origins of the Vespa in Italy. Unfortunately, during the filming everything that can go wrong, actually goes wrong, not in the least due to the inefficiency of fixer Haldis. The television makers are required to use their creativity to bring the production to a good end.

The program is a parody of similar travel program on Belgian television (Vlaanderen Vakantieland, De Bende van Wim).

Although the program had an average of 1.3 million viewers, some television critics were more critical.

== Cast ==
| Actor | Character |
|---|---|
| Bart De Pauw | Berre |
| Jonas Van Geel | Jocke |
| Ben Segers | Benji |
| Umesh Vangaver | Haldis |
| Elisa Mouliaá | Estella |
