= Prime Series =

Belgium digital television channel

Prime series is a digital television channel, one of seven owned by Prime, part of Telenet. The channel, which is viewable only in Belgium, chiefly shows drama series made elsewhere by, amongst others, Home Box Office (HBO) and the American Broadcasting Company (ABC).

Programs	Original channel	Belgian premiere	Timeslot	Episodes
American Horror Story S1	FX	unknown	No longer on air	12
American Horror Story: Asylum	FX	unknown	Wednesday 10:30 PM	13
Angry Boys	ABC1	5 July 2012	variable	12
Arn	TV4	3 May 2012	No longer on air	6
Boardwalk Empire S2	HBO	unknown	No longer on air	12
Boardwalk Empire S3	HBO	28 September 2012	variable	12
Bored to Death S1	HBO	12 November 2012	variable	8
Bored to Death S2	HBO	12 November 2012	Monday 10:30 PM	8
Bored to Death S3	HBO	7 January 2013	Monday 10:30 PM	8
Borgen S1	DR1	unknown	No longer on air	10
Borgen S2	DR1	17 July 2012	variable	10
Borgia	Canal+ ZDF; ORF 2 Sky (IT); Netflix	7 August 2012	on demand	10
Boss	Starz	6 October 2012	Saturday 10:30 PM	8
Californication S5	Showtime	6 July 2012	variable	12
Call Me Fitz S1	HBO Canada	1 August 2012	On Demand	13
Call Me Fitz S3	HBO Canada	1 November 2012	On Demand	13
Corleone	Canale 5	unknown	No longer on air	6
Dinotopia	ABC	1 July 2012	On Demand	3
Enlightened	HBO	26 September 2012	Wednesday 10:30 PM	10
Femme Fatales S1	Cinemax	1 September 2012	on demand	13
Femme Fatales S2	Cinemax	1 December 2012	on demand	14
Game of Thrones S1	HBO	Unknown	No longer on air	10
Game of Thrones S2	HBO	27 April 2012	No longer on air	10
Girls	HBO	18 July 2012	variable	10
Happy Endings S2	ABC	15 February 2012	No longer on air	22
Last Resort	ABC	8 November 2012	Thursday 10:30 PM	13
Luck	HBO	unknown	No longer on air	9
Mad Men S5	AMC	2 September 2012	Variable	13
Magic City	Starz	17 September 2012	Variable	10
Mildred Pierce	HBO	unknown	No longer on air	5
Modern Family S4	ABC	2 December 2012	Sunday 10:30 PM	22
Neverland	Syfy	unknown	variable	2
Parade's End	BBC; HBO; VRT	25 September 2012	Tuesday 10:30 PM	5
Quiz me quick	VRT	29 April 2012	No longer on air	10
Real Humans	SVT	30 October 2012	Tuesday 10:30 PM	10
Revenge S1	ABC	unknown	No longer on air	22
Revenge S2	ABC	1 December 2012	Saturday 10:30 PM	23
Smash	NBC	3 April 2012	Variable	15
Spartacus S2	Starz	12 February 2012	No longer on air	10
The Firm	Global; NBC; AXN	23 April 2012	No longer on air	22
The Killing S3	DR1	8 January 2013	Tuesday 10:30 PM	10
The Newsroom	HBO	28 July 2012	variable	10
The River	ABC	8 July 2012	Variable	8
The Story of Film: An Odyssey	More4	21 October 2012	Sunday 8:40 PM	15
The Trip	BBC Two; BBC HD	3 May 2012	On Demand	6
The Tudors S4	BBC Two; CBC Television; Showtime; TV3 (Ireland)	unknown	No longer on air	10
Titanic: Blood and Steel	History Asia	15 July 2012	On Demand	12
Veep	HBO	30 June	No longer on air	8
Warehouse S3	Syfy	unknown	No longer on air	13
Weeds S7	Showtime	unknown	No longer on air	13
Weeds S8	Showtime	21 December 2012	Friday 10:30 PM	13

Most programs can be viewed again by way of the Prime à la carte on-demand facility.
