= Hugo Matthysen =

Belgian singer, guitarist, columnist, writer, Master in Philosophy and actor (born 1956)

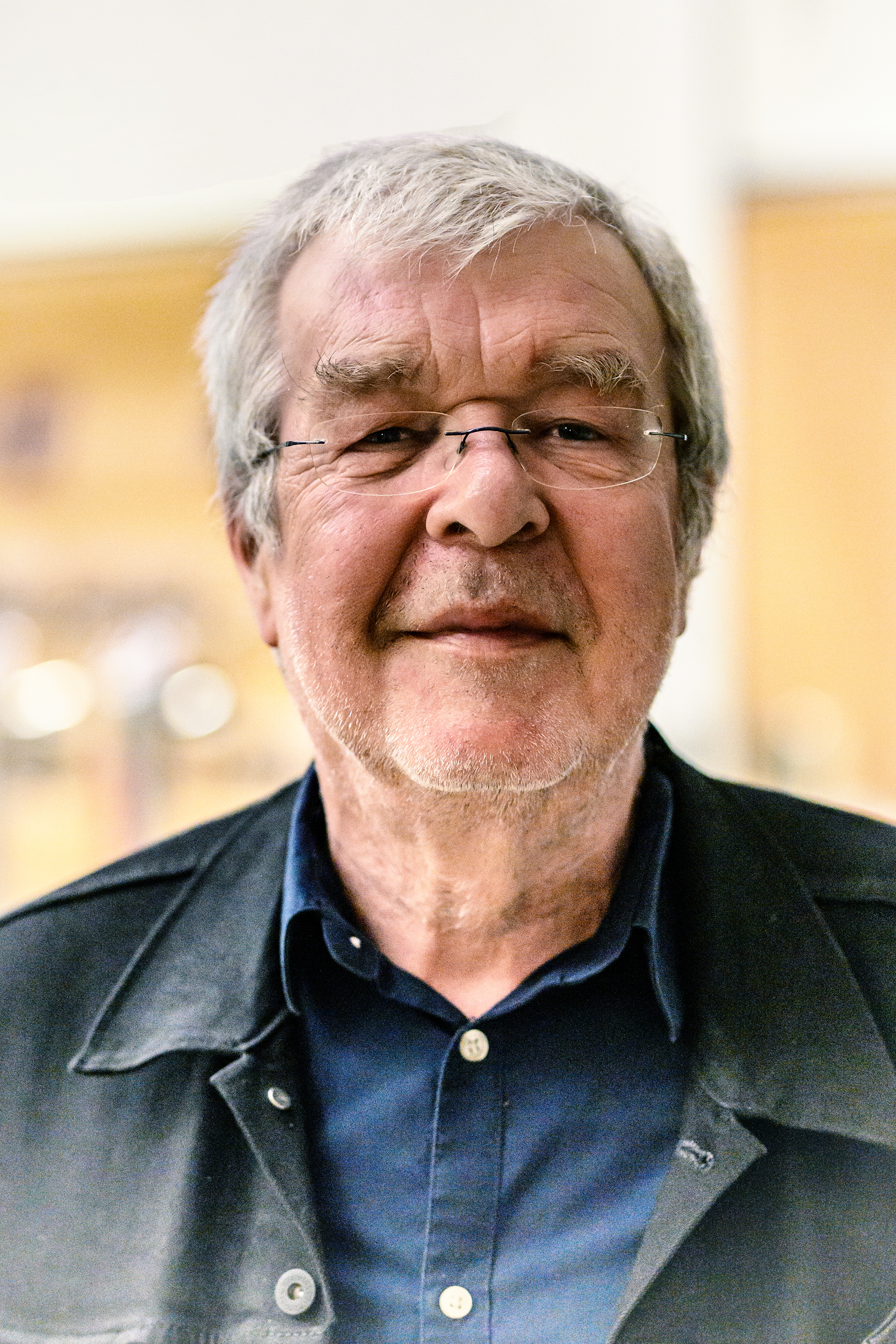
- Matthysen in 2023

Background information
- Also known as: Clement Peerens
- Born: Hugo Matthysen; 30 January 1956 (age 70); Ekeren, Belgium
- Genres: New wave, pop rock, jazz, world music
- Occupations: Musician, author, philosopher and actor

Hugo Matthysen (born 30 January 1956, in Ekeren) is a Belgian (Flemish) singer, guitarist, columnist, writer, Master in Philosophy and actor. He lives in the municipality of Hove in Antwerp.

== Biography ==
In 1978, he played with Bart Peeters and Jan Leyers in the coverband Beri-Beri.

In 1984, he regularly appeared with Bart Peeters and Marcel Vanthilt in Peeters' programme Villa Tempo as "De Hermannen". De Hermannen were three people with sunglasses, blonde wedge and wearing black jackets with a white sweater beneath, with which they intentionally looked like the German singer Heino. They played absurd sketches.

Matthysen then also started to write for the magazine HUMO, for which he would create several columns. He also founded a humouristic rock band, named "Hugo Matthysen en De Bomen", and in 1989 he delivered weekly contributions to the absurd programme Lava by Kamagurka and Herr Seele.

Together with Bart Peeters he created the radio programme Het Leugenpaleis for Studio Brussel. Later a television version came out with the (anagram) title Het Peulengaleis. Apart from that, he is the writer of TV series for children like Kulderzipken and Dag Sinterklaas and he is also author of the theater piece Frankenstein by Smrntwsk Alleen (1989). On top of that, he wrote some music texts for De Nieuwe Snaar.

The Dag Sinterklaas series he wrote about Sinterklaas (=Saint Nicholas, European origin of Santa Claus) since the early 1990s gave children in Flanders, Belgium a view on the daily life of the holy man. Also, it explained some of the questions children have around the event: why Zwarte Piet (Black Peter) is black (not his original skin colour, but because of sliding through the chimney) and how Sinterklaas acquires the presents (with a special kind of money). 20 years later, Bart Peeters stated it is thanks to Matthysen that in Belgium the Sinterklaas event has not been subject of a racism discussion as it has been in the Netherlands, because the series explains the figure of Zwarte Piet has nothing to do with slavery.

In 1990, together with HUMO chief-editor Guy Mortier, he presented the acts on the festival Torhout-Werchter (currently Rock Werchter).

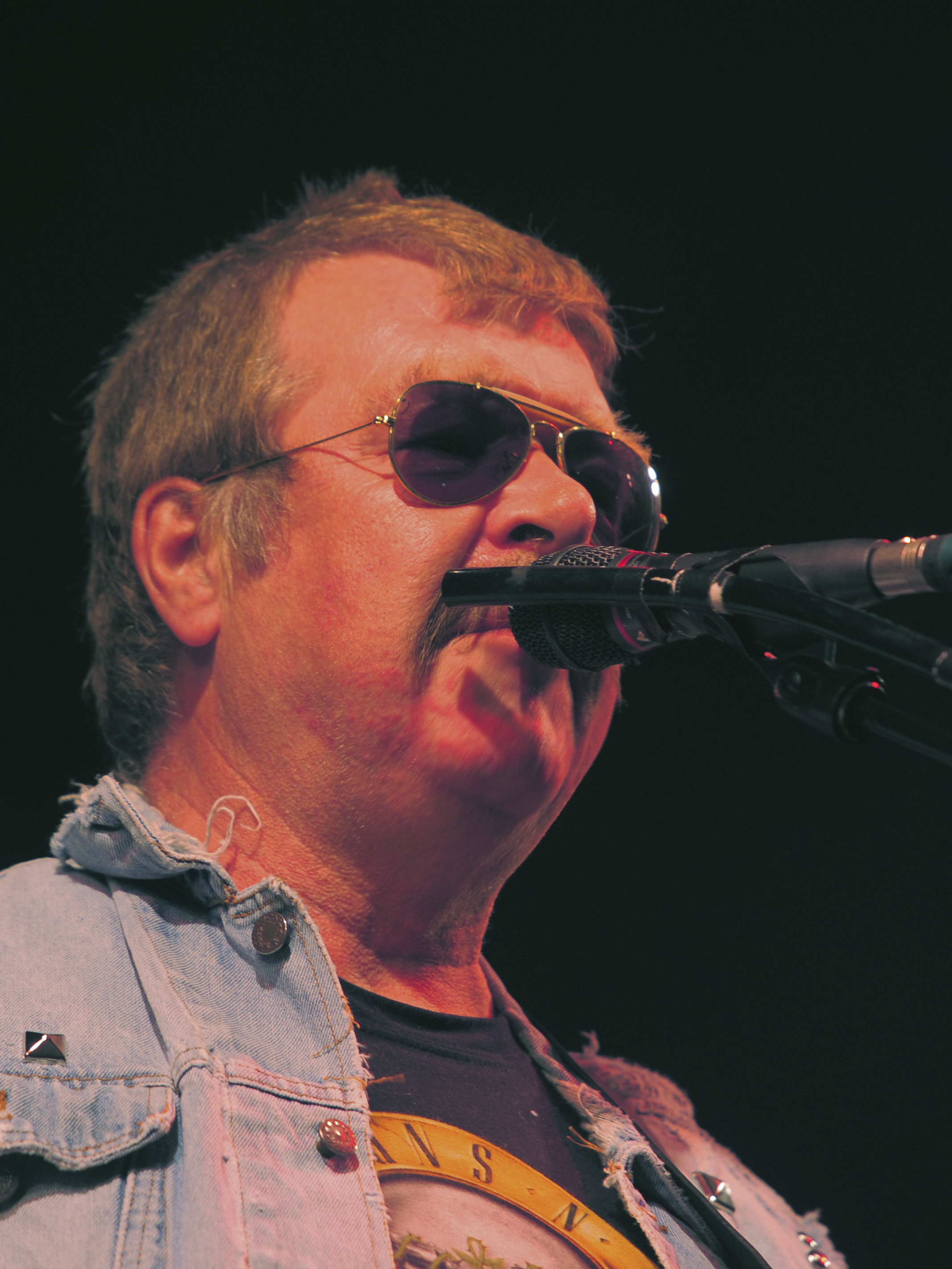
Matthysen performing as his alter ego Clement Peerens in 2013

His alter ego Clement Peerens became famous with his band CPeX (Clement Peerens Explosition – together with Ronny Mosuse and again Bart Peeters) and the girl band Hormonia.

In the summer of 2008, Hugo Matthysen again gave concerts with the Clement Peerens Explosition.

In 2010, he wrote the humouristic TV program Anneliezen.
