= Bart De Pauw =

Flemish TV host, comedian, actor and TV and film scriptwriter

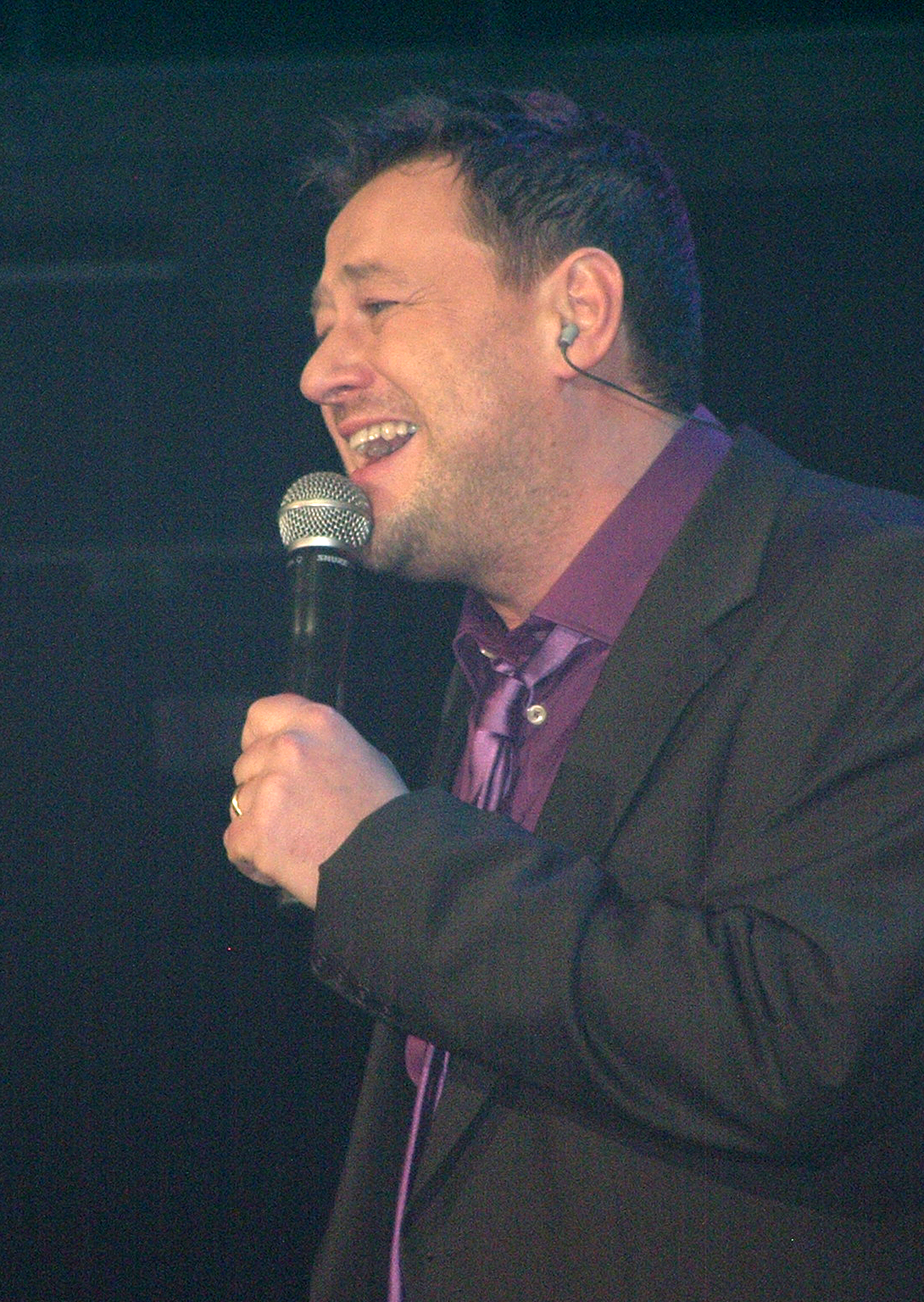
- Bart De Pauw in Steracteur Sterartiest Live on Stage (2008).
- Born: Bart De Pauw; 28 May 1968 (age 57); Wachtebeke, Belgium
- Occupations: Actor, producer, scriptwriter, host
- Known for: Buiten De Zone, Schalkse Ruiters, Het Geslacht De Pauw, Loft

Bart De Pauw (28 May 1968) is a Flemish TV host, comedian, actor and TV and film scriptwriter, known for humorous television series and shows on Belgian public television, like the satirical sketch show Buiten De Zone, the humorous talk show Schalkse Ruiters, Het Geslacht De Pauw (a mockumentary parody of reality TV), the sketch show Willy's en Marjetten, the game show De Mol and the humorous series Quiz Me Quick and De Biker Boys. He is also the scriptwriter of the Belgian blockbuster film Loft (2008), the original Flemish version of the Hollywood remake The Loft (2014).

== Allegations of sexual intimidation ==
Inspired by the Me Too movement, several women who worked with De Pauw on past productions filed complaints of sexual intimidation against him with Flemish public radio and television broadcasting service's ombudsman. Consequently, VRT decided to stop all collaboration with De Pauw and his production house as of 9 November 2017. After a widely mediatized trial in 2021, De Pauw was found guilty of stalking (5 women) and 'cyberharassment' (1 woman). The court handed down a six-month suspended sentence.
