= Bart Peeters =

Belgian singer, musician, television presenter and actor (born 1959)

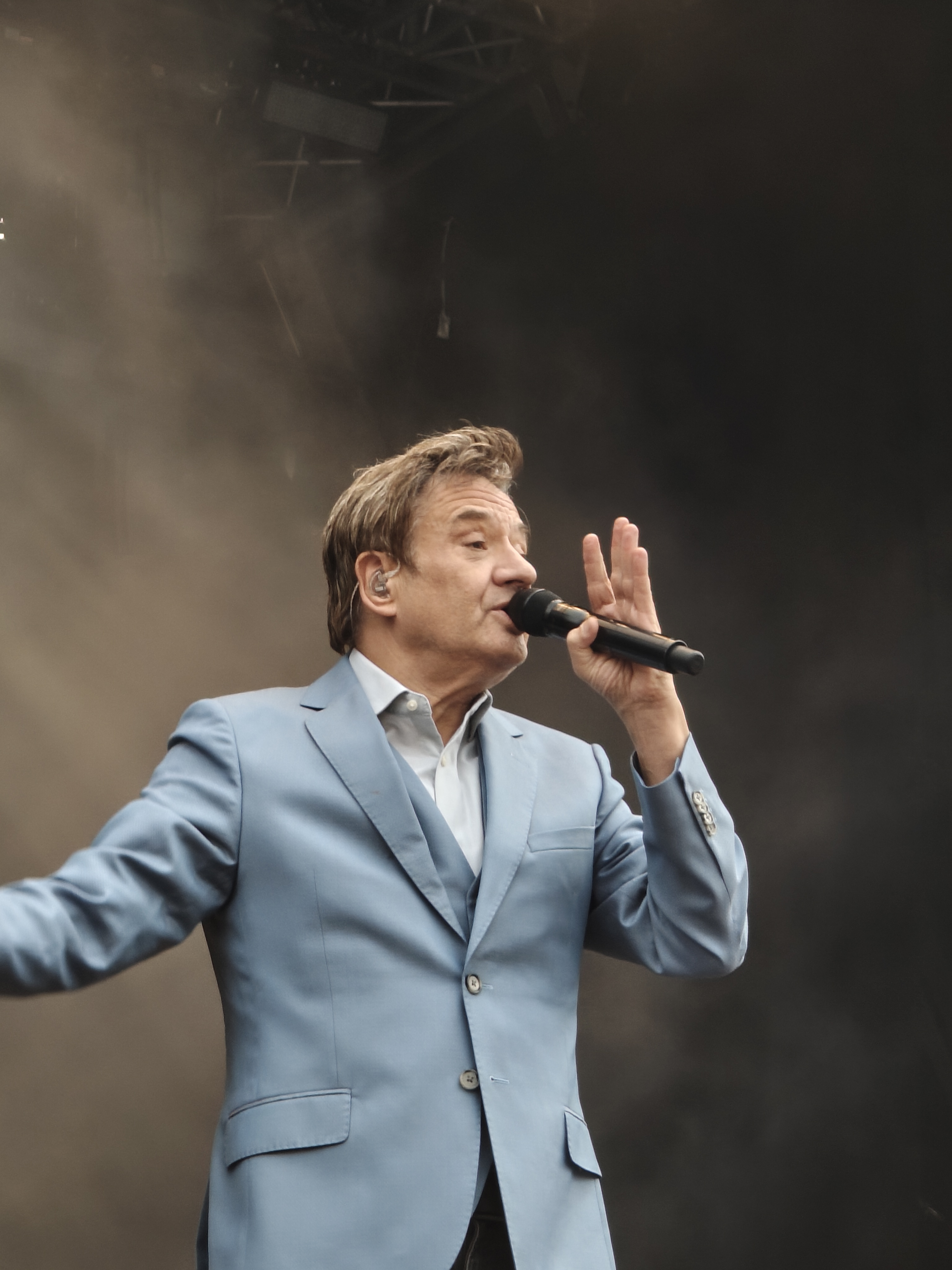
- Peeters in 2025
- Born: Bart August Maria Peeters; 30 November 1959 (age 66); Mortsel, Belgium
- Occupations: actor, musician, television presenter

Bart August Maria Peeters (born 30 November 1959) is a Belgian singer, musician, television presenter and actor.

== Biography ==
=== Early years ===
Peeters studied Germanic philology and drama in Antwerp. There, he met Jan Leyers and Hugo Matthysen, with whom he worked later.

In 1972, Peeters, still a teenager, played the title role in teen drama Bart Banninks. He went on to present some comedy and music shows aimed at teenagers. In 1978, Bart Peeters, Hugo Matthysen, Jan Leyers, and Marc Kruithof played in a coverband called Beri Beri, but as a musician, Bart Peeters gained fame with The Radios. This band (with Ronny Mosuse, Robert Mosuse, Dany Lademacher, Alain Van Zeveren, and Marc Bonne) had an international hit with 'She Goes Nana' in 1991.

=== Television career ===
After gaining fame, his television career took off starting with a main role in the now legendary series Dag Sinterklaas, in which he visited Sinterklaas (played by Jan Decleir) in his castle. After that, he presented some of the most popular television shows in Flanders, such as De Droomfabriek and De Leukste Eeuw. Het Peulengaleis, a television spin-off from Het Leugenpaleis, a radio comedy show he presented together with Hugo Matthysen, gained a large cult following. He became the most popular television personality in Flanders, being selected to present large one-off shows such as the celebration show for 50 years of television in Flanders or the tsunami relief telethon and presenting some television shows in The Netherlands.

Music was always present in his television career: he presented the Flemish selection show for the Eurovision Song Contest several times, had his talent show (De Grote Prijs Bart Peeters), and presented several music shows (Lalala Live, Nonkel Pop,...). During this time he was also the drummer for The Clement Peerens Explosition, a parody rock band that started in his radio show Het Leugenpaleis.

=== Solo career ===
After touring as Bart Peeters zonder circus (Bart Peeters without circus) and making a solo album based on the tour called Het Plaatje van Bart Peeters (The Record of Bart Peeters) in 2004, he decided to spend more time on music again, starting a proper solo career. In 2006 he made Slimmer dan de Zanger (More Clever Than the Singer) and in 2008 he released his third album, De Hemel in het Klad (Draft of Heaven), which went straight to number one on the Flemish charts. A fourth album titled De Ideale Man (The Ideal Man), said to be the third of a trilogy together with Slimmer dan de Zanger and De Hemel in het Klad, was released in October 2010. That same year, he won a Music Industry Award in Flanders for best Dutch-language artist, after which he released a compilation album called Het Beste en Tot Nog Eens (All the best and see you later) and took a break from recording music. In 2014 he made his comeback with Op de Groei (To Grow Into).

== Personal life ==
Peeters is married and has two daughters and a son. He lives in Hove near Antwerp.

== Discography ==
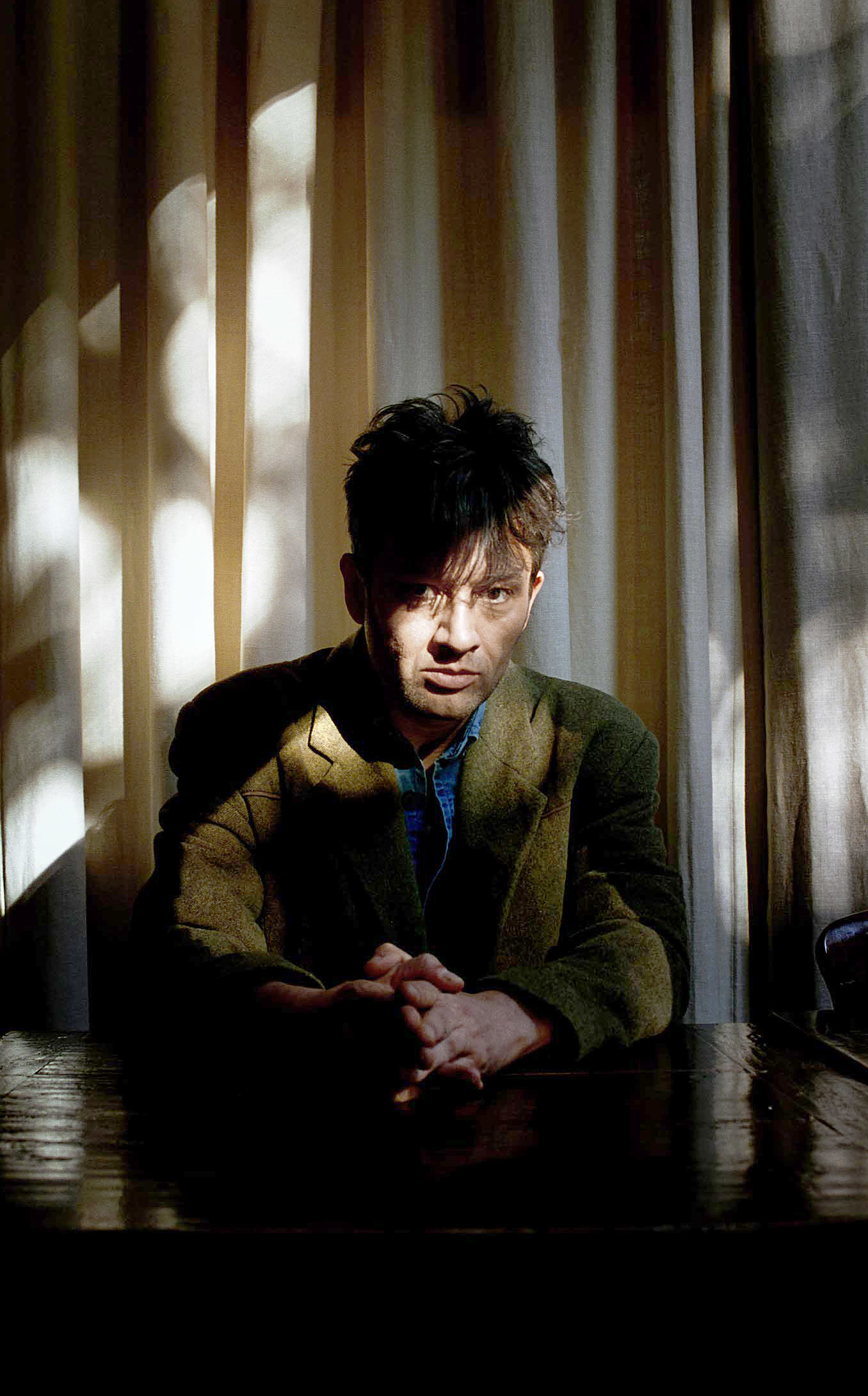
Peeters in 2002

- Het Plaatje van Bart Peeters (2004)
- Slimmer dan de Zanger (2006)
- De Hemel in het Klad (2008)
- Het kinderplaatje van Bart Peeters (2008)
- De Ideale Man (2010)
- Het beste en tot nog eens (2011)
- Op de Groei (2014)
- Live 2015-2016 (2016)
- Brood voor morgenvroeg (2017)
- Bart Peeters & Pop Up Koor o.l.v. Hans Primusz (2019)
- Bart Peeters Deluxe – Live in de Lotto Arena (2020)

== Television programs ==
- Bart Banninks (1976), teen drama
- Magister Maesius (1973), teen drama
- Elektron (1982–1984), science show
- Pop-Elektron (1982–1984), music show
- De Droomfabriek (1989–1995), dream-fulfilling-show
- Dag Sinterklaas (1993–1994), children's series
- De Vliegende Doos (1995), variety show
- De Liegende Doos (1995), late night version of De Vliegende Doos
- Kinderen voor Kinderen festival (1989–1992), children's series
- Lalala Live (1996–1999), music show
- NV Peeters (1997), game show
- Nonkel Pop (1998), music show
- TopPop Yeah (on AVRO)
- De Droomshow (1997–1999), (on AVRO)
- De Grote Prijs Bart Peeters (1999–2000), talent contest
- De Leukste Eeuw (1999–2003), compilation show about television history
- Het Peulengaleis (1999–2004), absurd comedy show
- De Nationale Test (2001)
- Eurosong (1999, 2002, 2004, 2006, 2008, 2014)
- Hoe?Zo! (2002–2009), game show about science on both Flemish and Dutch television
- 50 jaar televisie (2003), one-off celebration for 50 years of Television in Flanders
- Hij komt, hij komt ... De intrede van de Sint (2003–present), annual arrival of Sinterklaas broadcast live
- Geen Zorgen tot Paniek (2004), variety show
- Tsunami 12-12 (2005), one-off tsunami simulcast telethon
- Media Morgen: de grote zap voorwaarts (2006), one-off show about the future of television
- De show van het jaar (2006), New Year's show
- De bedenkers (2007–2008), invention talent contest
- Zeker Weten! (on Teleac/NOT) (2008–2009), quiz show
- K2 zoekt K3 (2009), talent show for a new member for pop group K3
- Mag ik u kussen? (2009–2011), celebrity comedy version of Blind Date
- De Generatieshow (2010), game show
- De Slimste Thuis (2011), family game show
- Een Laatste Groet (2012), comedy guest show
- De Neus van Pinokkio (2013), comedy celebrity game show
- Bart & Siska (2015)
