= Paradis metro station =

Metro station in Fontaine-l'Évêque, Belgium

Paradis

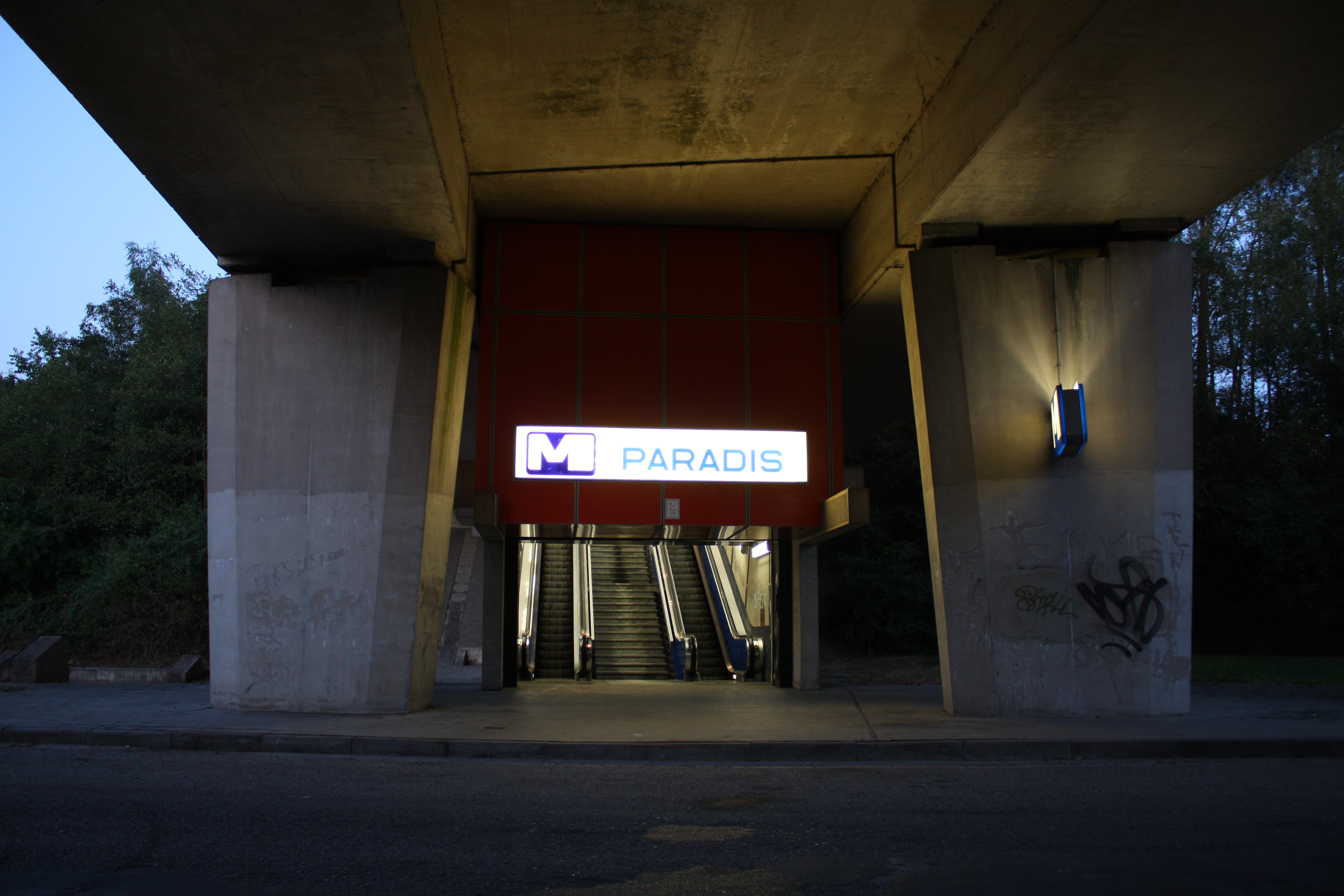

General information
- Coordinates: 50°24′19″N 4°20′17″E
- Transit authority: TEC Charleroi
- Platforms: Central
- Tracks: 2

Construction
- Platform levels: 1
- Parking: No

History
- Opened: 24 May 1983

Services
Preceding station	Charleroi Metro	Following station
Fontaine towards Monument	M1	Leernes towards Sud
Fontaine towards Monument	M2	Leernes towards Sud
Location

Paradis (French pronunciation: [paʁadi], lit. 'Paradise') is a Charleroi Metro station, located in Fontaine-l'Évêque, in fare zone 2. The eastern end of the station is at ground level, while the western end is on a viaduct. The station is accessed through escalators and stairs at the western end of the central platform.

The name of the station comes from the Rue du Paradis (Paradise street) where it is located.

== Nearby points of interest ==
The station serves the southeastern part of Fontaine-l'Évêque, and the northeastern part of Leernes.

== Transfers ==
There are no direct bus transfers at the station, although a stop of TEC Charleroi bus lines 63 is located nearby.
