= Buken =

- Municipality
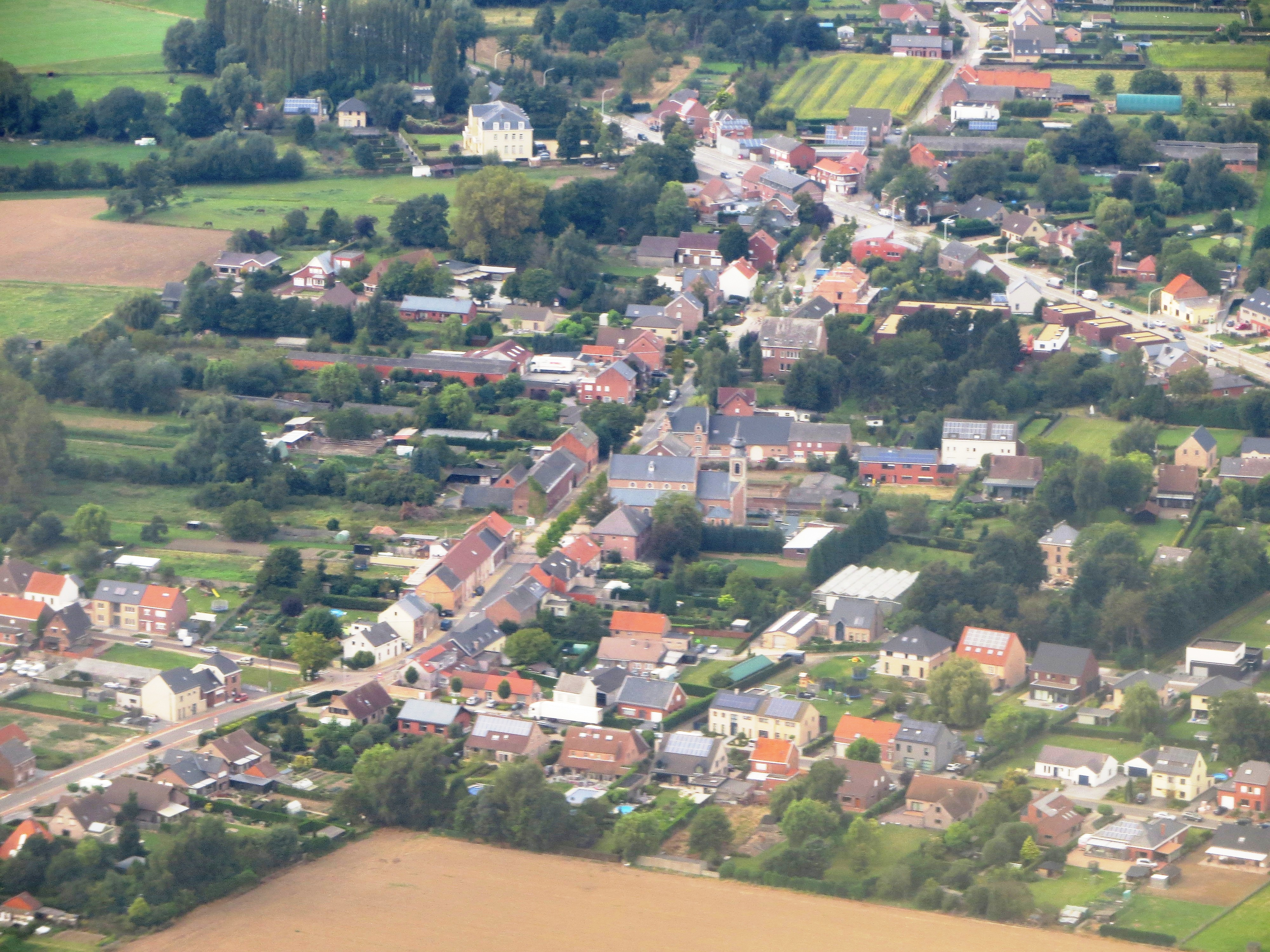
- Aerial photograph of Buken
- Interactive map of Buken
- Location in Belgium
- Coordinates: 50°56′N 04°37′E
- Country: Belgium
- Community: Flemish Community
- Region: Flemish Region
- Province: Flemish Brabant
- Postal codes: 1910
- NIS code: 23038(B)

Buken is a submunicipality of Kampenhout, a municipality in the Flemish Brabant province of Belgium. It was an independent municipality until the municipal mergers of 1977, when it became part of Kampenhout.

As of 1 January 2025, Buken had a population of 568 and an area of 2.19 km², giving a population density of 259 inhabitants per km².

== Heritage ==
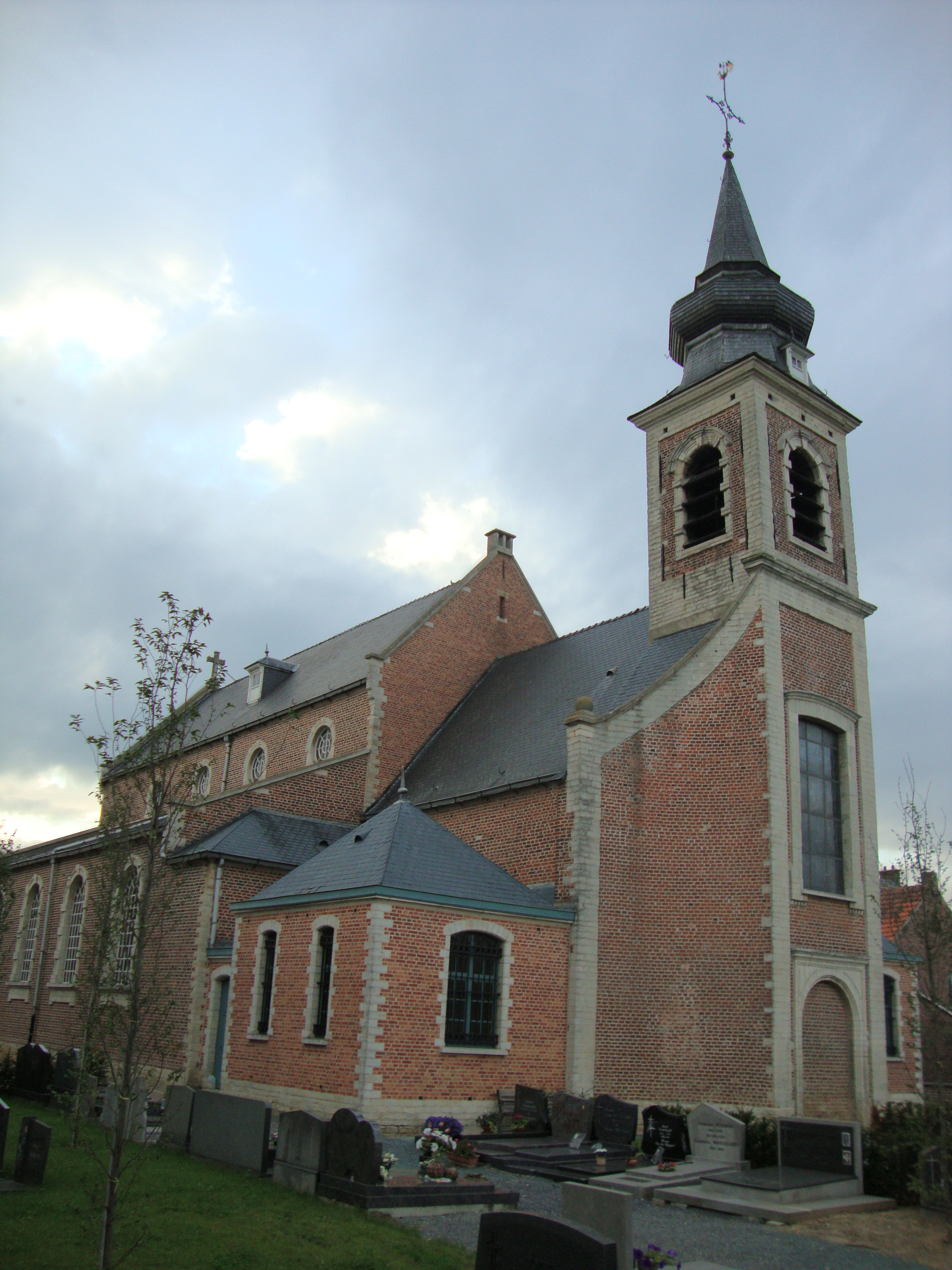
Saint Anthony church

The heritage inventory for Buken includes the following heritage objects:

- Saint Anthony church the Abbot (Parochiekerk Heilige Antonius Kluizenaar)
- A mature copper beech as a memorial tree (Opgaande bruine beuk als herdenkingsboom).
