= Borders of Belgium (cycling) =

Borders of Belgium (BOB), officially the BOB 1000km BRM, is a non-competitive long-distance ("randonneuring") cycling event. Riders complete a 1,000 km clockwise loop tracing the borders of Belgium within a 75-hour limit, starting and finishing in Antwerp. The event originated in 2016, starting from Wachtebeke, drew around 90 riders, including entrants from the UK and Germany. Further editions followed in 2018 and 2020, the latter held despite disruption from the COVID-19 pandemic. The 2022 edition was cancelled due to the loss of an overnight venue. Audax Belgium has organized the event since, continuing the biennial schedule; the 2026 edition extends the route to include Luxembourg's borders, with more than 160 participants from 11 countries.

The route hugs Belgium's and Luxembourg's international frontiers, passing near tripoints such as the Belgium–Germany–Netherlands junction and the Belgium–Germany–Luxembourg junction at Ouren. It is entirely paved. The eastern and southern stages cross the hillier terrain of the Ardennes, while the final stage back to Antwerp is flatter, following coastal, lowland and often windy terrain through Tournai, Ypres, and Ostend. The elevation gain is around 6,700m over three stages, from Antwerp to Echternach, Luxembourg; on to Mons; and back to Antwerp, making an average of 340km to be covered each day.

Audax Belgium, based in Tervuren, organizes the event as a certified BRM brevet recognized by the Audax Club Parisien, and is responsible for route design, checkpoint staffing, and optional accommodation packages. The organization is run by volunteers and is supported by Randonneurs Belgium.
