= Morgnies metro station =

Metro station in Charleroi, Belgium

Morgnies

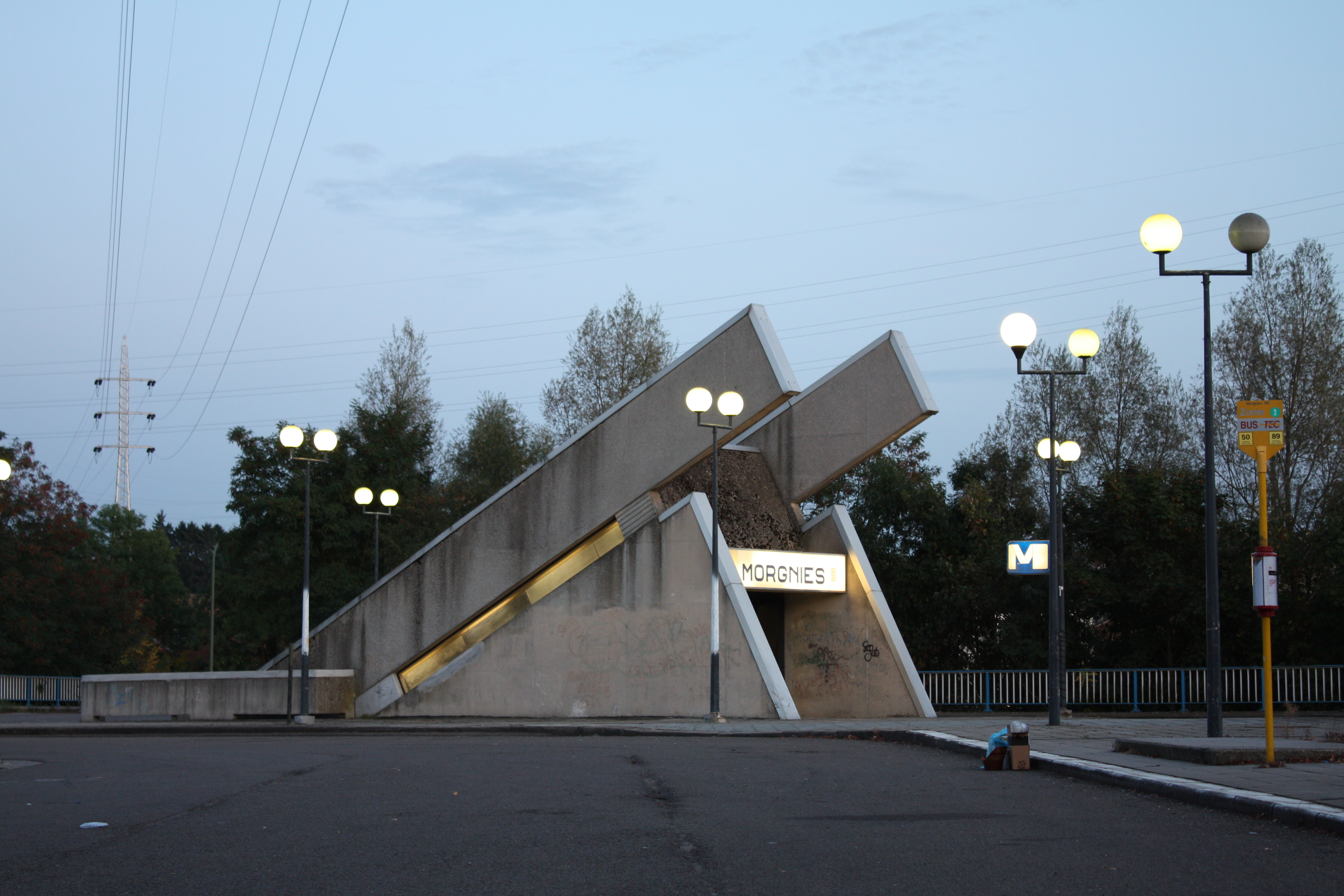

General information
- Coordinates: 50°24′15″N 4°21′54″E
- Transit authority: TEC Charleroi
- Platforms: Central
- Tracks: 2
- Bus routes: 3
- Bus operators: TEC Charleroi

Construction
- Platform levels: 1
- Parking: No

History
- Opened: 24 May 1983

Services
Preceding station	Charleroi Metro	Following station
Leernes towards Monument	M1	Moulin towards Sud
Leernes towards Monument	M2	Moulin towards Sud
Location

Morgnies is a Charleroi Metro station, build at ground level and located in Goutroux (part of the Charleroi municipality), in fare zone 2. The station has only one entrance (on its western end), equipped with escalators and stairs.

== Nearby points of interest ==
The station is located between two sparsely populated residential areas, one in Goutroux, the other one in Monceau-sur-Sambre ("Hameau").

== Transfers ==
TEC Charleroi bus lines 51, 53 and M1ab.
