= Fontaine metro station =

Metro station in Charleroi, Belgium

Fontaine

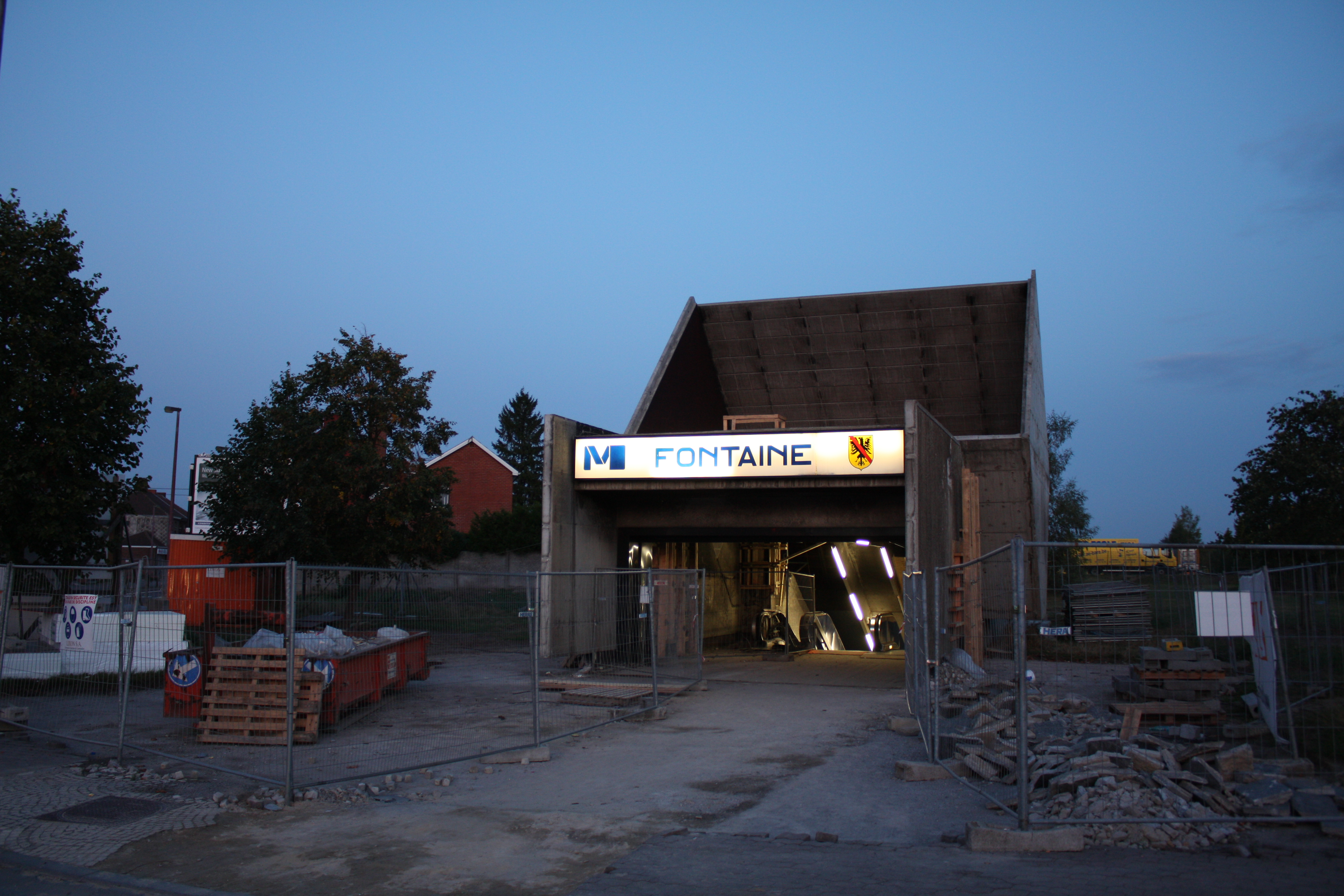

General information
- Coordinates: 50°24′24″N 4°19′37″E
- Transit authority: TEC Charleroi
- Platforms: Central
- Tracks: 2
- Bus routes: 4
- Bus operators: TEC Charleroi

Construction
- Platform levels: 1
- Parking: No

History
- Opened: 22 August 1992

Services
Preceding station	Charleroi Metro	Following station
Pétria towards Monument	M1	Paradis towards Sud
Pétria towards Monument	M2	Paradis towards Sud
Location

Fontaine (French pronunciation: [fɔ̃tɛn]) is a Charleroi Metro station, located in Fontaine-l'Évêque, in fare zone 7. It is an underground station featuring a central platform with street access at its western end.

The station has been refurbished in 2009-2010 and its current version was inaugurated on 16 June 2010. The interior decoration, made of colored castle-like shapes on a white background, is a work of architect Ingrid Lange.

== Nearby points of interest ==
The station is located in the center of Fontaine-l'Évêque.

== Transfers ==
TEC Charleroi bus lines 63, 173, M1ab and MFON.
