= List of protected heritage sites in Fontaine-l'Evêque =

This table shows an overview of the protected heritage sites in the Walloon town Fontaine-l'Évêque. This list is part of Belgium's national heritage.

Object	Year/architect	Town/section	Address	Coordinates	Number^{?}	Image
Church of Saint-Christophe ^{(nl)} ^{(fr)}		Fontaine-l'Evêque		50.411806°N 4.321534°E	52022-CLT-0001-01 Info	Kerk Saint-Christophe
Castle Bivort ^{(nl)} ^{(fr)}		Fontaine-l'Evêque		50.412186°N 4.324542°E	52022-CLT-0002-01 Info	Kasteel van Bivort
St. Martin's Church ^{(nl)} ^{(fr)}		Fontaine-l'Evêque		50.397359°N 4.331812°E	52022-CLT-0005-01 Info	Kerk Saint-Martin
municipal park ^{(nl)} ^{(fr)}		Fontaine-l'Evêque		50.409922°N 4.324940°E	52022-CLT-0007-01 Info	sectionlijk park
Bivort Castle and its surroundings ^{(nl)} ^{(fr)}		Fontaine-l'Evêque		50.411866°N 4.322524°E	52022-CLT-0008-01 Info	Kasteel Bivort en zijn omgeving
Chapel de la Briqueterie: facades and roofs ^{(nl)} ^{(fr)}		Fontaine-l'Evêque	rue de la briqueterie	50.416167°N 4.330390°E	52022-CLT-0009-01 Info	
House: walls and roofs ^{(nl)} ^{(fr)}		Fontaine-l'Evêque	rue Despy, n° 21	50.412210°N 4.319735°E	52022-CLT-0010-01 Info	
House: walls and roofs ^{(nl)} ^{(fr)}		Fontaine-l'Evêque	rue Despy, n° 71	50.412896°N 4.316355°E	52022-CLT-0011-01 Info	
House: walls and roofs ^{(nl)} ^{(fr)}		Fontaine-l'Evêque	Grand' rue n° 21	50.410596°N 4.323271°E	52022-CLT-0012-01 Info	
Church of Saint-Vaast: tower ^{(nl)} ^{(fr)}		Fontaine-l'Evêque	rue J.A.S. Parée	50.409621°N 4.324528°E	52022-CLT-0013-01 Info	Kerk Saint-Vaast: toren
Rowof houses in the Dardinne street numbers 2 through 20, and the house at the corner formed by that street and the square "Degauque", the surface of the street, the water gutters and the sidewalks paved in blue hardstone (Namense steen) ^{(nl)} ^{(fr)}		Fontaine-l'Evêque		50.398320°N 4.331873°E	52022-CLT-0015-01 Info	
House: walls and roofs ^{(nl)} ^{(fr)}		Fontaine-l'Evêque	rue Fauconnier, n° 14	50.410188°N 4.324212°E	52022-CLT-0016-01 Info	

== See also ==
- List of protected heritage sites in Hainaut (province)
- Fontaine-l'Évêque
