= Pétria metro station =

Metro station in Fontaine-l'Évêque, Belgium

Pétria

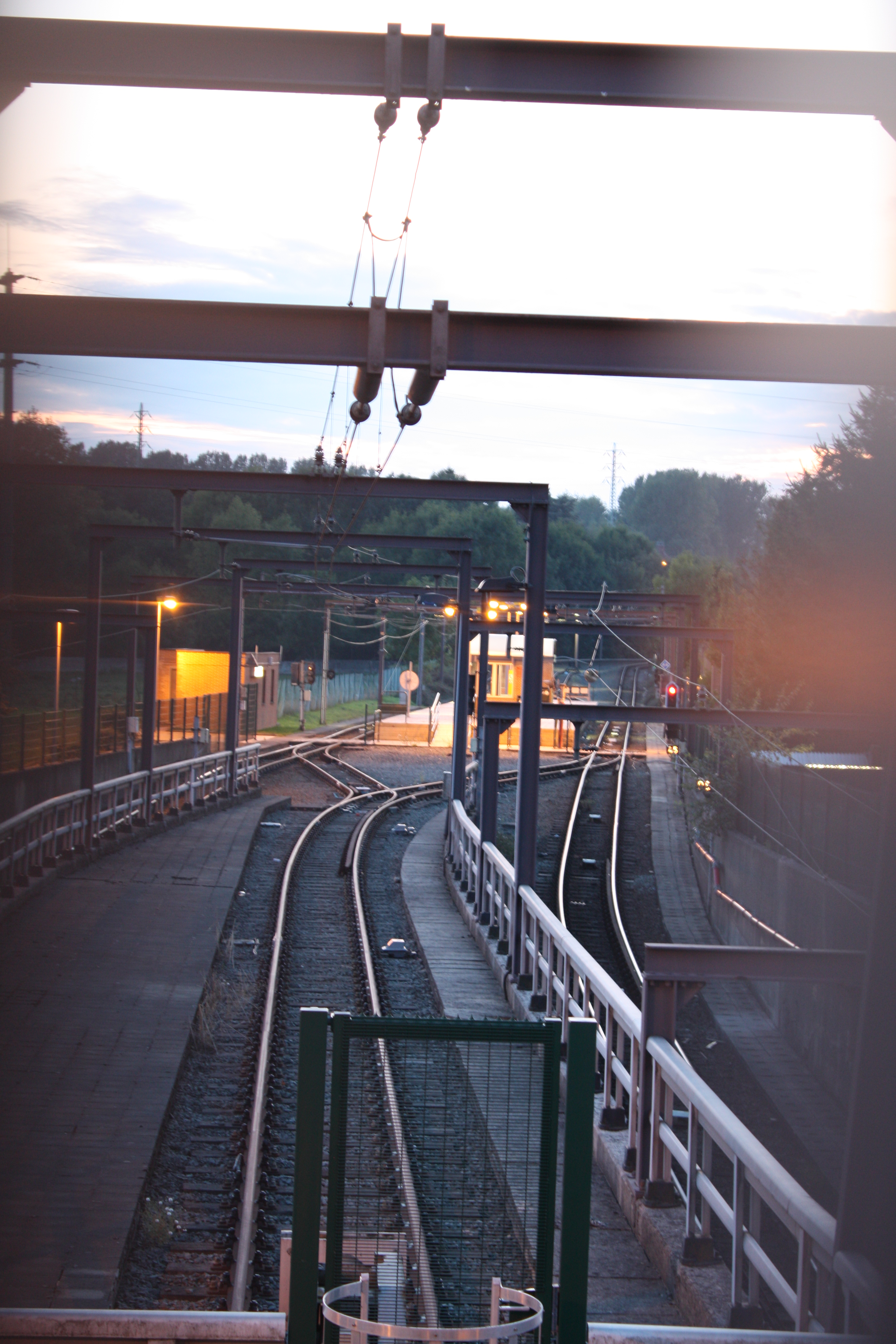

General information
- Coordinates: 50°24′22″N 4°18′42″E
- Transit authority: TEC Charleroi
- Platforms: Central
- Tracks: 2
- Bus routes: 3
- Bus operators: TEC Charleroi

Construction
- Platform levels: 1
- Parking: No

History
- Opened: 25 May 1986

Services
Preceding station	Charleroi Metro	Following station
Coron du Berger towards Monument	M1	Fontaine towards Sud
Coron du Berger towards Monument	M2	Fontaine towards Sud
Location

Pétria (French pronunciation: [petʁija]) is a Charleroi Metro station, located in Fontaine-l'Évêque, in fare zone 7. It is a surface station featuring a central platform with street access at its eastern end. When the future line 3 opens, Pétria will become the terminus of line 2.

Pétria is the last Pre-metro type station on the Anderlues line, as the line becomes a standard tram line west of the station (toward Anderlues).

== Nearby points of interest ==
- Terril du Pétria, a Spoil tip classified as a nature reserve.

== Transfers ==
TEC Charleroi bus line 63, 173 and M1ab.
