= Overslag =

Overslag may refer to:

== Places ==
- Overslag, Belgium, a village in Belgium
- Overslag, Netherlands, a village in Netherlands
