= Fusion of the Belgian municipalities =

Merger and rearrangement of Belgian municipalities from 1975 to 1983

Map of provinces and municipalities of Belgium after merger.

The fusion of the Belgian municipalities (French: fusion des communes, Dutch: fusie van Belgische gemeenten) was a Belgian political process that rationalized and reduced the number of municipalities in Belgium between 1964 and 1983. In 1961, there were 2,663 such municipalities; by 1983, these had been re-arranged and combined into 589 larger municipalities.

== French and Dutch periods (1796–1830) ==
The annexation by France of the Austrian Netherlands, the principalities of Liège and Stavelot-Malmedy and the Duchy of Bouillon on 4 Brumaire of Year IV of the Revolution (26 October 1795) led to territorial reorganization, with the commune as the basic territorial unit. In 1800, there were 2,741 communes in what is now Belgium. (Note: Page 45.) However, the French authorities wanted to reduce the number of communes in the Belgian départements, and urged the departmental prefects to take measures to that effect. A total of 127 communes were abolished during this period in the Jemappe, Dyle and Sambre-et-Meuse departments. The Dutch period did not put an end to this process, which continued to a lesser extent, so that by 1830 there were 2,492 communes.

== From independence to the interwar period (1830–1940) ==
With Belgium's independence, the trend was reversed with the creation of new communes, reaching a peak in 1928, when the country counted 2,675 communes, after 153 had been created and 7 abolished over the same period. (Note: Page 46.) Thus, in 1896, the hamlet called La Bretagne separated from Landelies (part of Montigny-le-Tilleul since 1977) to become an autonomous commune under the name Goutroux. Article 3 of the Belgian Constitution as then in force (currently article 7) and the provincial law of 1836 codified the procedures for mergers or the creation of new communes in Belgium.

During this period, Belgium underwent two changes to its territorial boundaries. The Treaty of London (1839) led Belgium to cede part of its territory, forming the province of Limburg (Netherlands) and the Grand Duchy of Luxembourg. Since 1830, Belgium had administered the whole of Limburg and Luxembourg. In 1831, the Treaty of the Eighteen Articles had recognized this, but it was never signed by the Netherlands. The corresponding communes were therefore lost in 1839. After the First World War, the communes of the East Cantons were annexed from Germany.

Population movements, the rural exodus and the economic upheavals of the 19th and early 20th centuries led to new thinking on the organization of the municipal map, especially in Brussels, where there was a desire to create a "Greater Brussels". (Note: Page 47.) On the eve of the First World War, two solutions were put forward: grouping the outlying communes with Brussels, or creating an inter-communal structure to manage certain responsibilities. In 1921, just after the war, the mayor of Brussels, Adolphe Max, proposed the creation of a metropolitan district for the Brussels conurbation. In the same year, the communes of Laeken, Neder-Over-Heembeek and Haren merged with Brussels to form the City of Brussels, without any consultation and consent of the concerned populations. In the interwar period, publications on communal management outlined ideas for the future of communes, including the merger of communes. (Note: Page 48.)

== World War II ==
The German occupation of Belgium during World War II overturned the kingdom's municipal structure. The Germans wanted the outlying communes around major conurbations to form a single commune with a single administration and police organization As a result, several communes were grouped together, leading to the birth of seven large communes between 1941 and 1942: Antwerp, Bruges, Brussels, Charleroi, Ghent, La Louvière and Liège. (Note: Pages 48 and 49.) The legal authorities opposed these creations, and on 1 February 1943, the Court of Cassation confirmed the illegality of the creation of Greater Antwerp, despite the insistence of the occupation authorities. (Note: Page 49.) The end of the German occupation put a radical end to these mergers of communes and a return to the pre-war status quo, but the idea was not abandoned.

== Unitary Law ==
In the aftermath of the Second World War, four communes were abolished between 1945 and 1961. (Note: Page 50.) On 1 January 1961, there were 2,663 communes in Belgium. A ministerial circular of 1957 and a policy declaration by the Eyskens III Government in November 1958 encouraged small communes to merge. This led to the Unitary Law of 14 February 1961, which introduced new provisions to facilitate mergers of communes by giving the government the right to carry out such regroupings for a period of ten years. These new provisions led to an initial reduction in the number of communes. In 1964, Belgium had 2,585 communes, 110 of which were grouped into 37 new entities. Belgium had come to have 2,379 communes by 1970, and 2,359 the following year.

At the end of this ten-year period, in 1971, Lucien Harmegnies, Minister of the Interior under the Eyskens IV Government (1968–1972), decided to proceed with the remembrement of the territory and had a new law passed on 23 July 1971. This broadened the scope of the Unitary Law to make it applicable in the case of large conurbations, initially excluded from these provisions. (Note: Page 51.) However, no new merger proposals were put forward until June 1974.

== Michel Plan and 1977 merger ==
In September 1974, the Minister of the Interior, Joseph Michel, of the Tindemans II Government, announced the launch of the remodeling of the communal map, to be completed by the communal elections of October 1976. (Note: Page 52.) Several criteria were used to group communes together, such as financial, geographical, linguistic, economic, social or cultural elements, without altering the boundaries of the administrative districts and provinces unless they were justified under the law of 23 July 1971. After consulting the provinces and communes between September 1974 and January 1975 on merger proposals, a draft merger plan was written and submitted to two regional ministerial committees, one for Wallonia and the other for Flanders. (Note: Pages 52 and 53.)

This project resulted in the Royal Decree of 17 September 1975, dividing Belgium into 589 communes by 1 January 1977, but was postponed by six years for Antwerp and seven communes on its outskirts.

This was ratified by the law of 30 December 1975. On 1 January 1977, Belgium went from 2,359 to 596 communes.

== Antwerp merger and rectification of municipal boundaries (1977–1983) ==
Following the adoption of the law of December 1975, in 1976 a special commission was set up in each province to rectify the administrative boundaries of all 596 communes. (Note: Page 53 and 54.) After discussions with communes, individuals and private bodies, royal decrees were issued in 1982 to finalize the rectifications. (Note: Page 54.)

Having obtained a six-year reprieve, in the course of 1982, two decrees and two laws regulated the details of the merger of the communes of Antwerp, Berchem, Borgerhout, Deurne, Ekeren, Hoboken, Merksem and Wilrijk for 1 January 1983. (Note: Page 53.) On 1 January 1983, Belgium comprised 589 communes, as stipulated by the law of 30 December 1975: 308 in the Flemish Region, 262 in the Walloon Region and 19 in the Brussels-Capital Region.

== 21st century ==
The regionalisation of local government organisation slowly renewed the question of municipality merging, especially in Flanders. The Flemish, Walloon and Brussels Regions became responsible for their respective municipalities through the special law of 13 July 2001 transferring various powers to the regions and communities.

=== Brussels Region ===
In their 13 July 2009 coalition agreement for the Brussels-Capital Region, the PS, Ecolo, cdH, Open Vld, CD&V and Groen agreed to set up a working group on the better distribution of competences between the Region and the communes and on communal borders, which would be made up of regional and communal representatives and would submit its conclusions over two years. On 17 September 2010, the note concluded "Following the debate on the advisability of merging communes, the group recommends reviewing communal boundaries crossing obstacles such as railroads or roadways."

=== Flanders Region ===
The Flemish decree of 24 June 2016 on the Voluntary Merging of Municipalities created a regulated procedure, including a financial incentive for municipalities who merge. After decades without any change, some municipalities began seriously considering a fusion.

Fifteen Flemish municipalities were merged into seven as of 1 January 2019, reducing the number of Flemish municipalities from 308 to 300, and the Belgian total from 589 to 581.

Several more municipalities are in the process of merging by 1 January 2025: e.g. Gooik, Galmaarden and Herne, Hasselt and Kortessem, Lochristi and Wachtebeke. Most fusions were decided by the municipal councils without – nonbinding – local referendums, and where one was organised, several (Zwijndrecht, Ruiselede) went on against the decision of the population (91% in Ruiselede in April 2022), but in at least one case (Boortmeerbeek) a fusion aborted as a consequence of the referendum.

=== Walloon Region ===
The Walloon décret regulating future fusions of communes was published in the Moniteur belge on 17 September 2019. The only fusion approved so far by the Walloon Parliament, due to be effective on 1 January 2025, unites Bastogne and Bertogne under the Bastogne denomination. A nonbinding referendum on the fusion was held in Bertogne on 20 November 2022, 42% eligible voters took part, 65% voted against the fusion, but the process went on, as announced beforehand.

== See also ==
- List of municipalities of the Brussels-Capital Region (19 municipalities)
- List of municipalities of the Flemish Region (285 municipalities)
- List of municipalities in Wallonia (261 municipalities)
