= Kwinten Clappaert =

Belgian footballer

Personal information
- Full name: Kwinten Clappaert
- Date of birth: 6 December 1988 (age 37)
- Place of birth: Lochristi, Belgium
- Height: 1.84 m (6 ft 0 in)
- Position: Midfielder

Youth career
- Begonia Lochristi
- Lokeren

Senior career*
Years	Team	Apps	(Gls)
2006–2010	Lokeren	4	(0)
2010–2011	Hoek	2	(0)
2011	K.Olsa Brakel	6	(0)
2011–2012	SC Wielsbeke		

International career
2005–2006	Belgium U18	4	(0)
2006–2007	Belgium U19	8	(0)
- * Club domestic league appearances and goals

Kwinten Clappaert (born 6 December 1988 in Lochristi) is a Belgian footballer who last played for SC Wielsbeke.

== Career ==
Clappaert made his debut for KSC Lokeren in February 2006 as a replacement in a 1–2 Belgian First Division game defeat against K. Sint-Truidense V.V. He played for HSV Hoek in the Dutch third division in the 2010/11 season.

== Personal life ==
He is currently studying industrial engineering at KaHo Sint-Lieven in Ghent.

== See also ==
- Football in Belgium
- List of football clubs in Belgium
