= Overslag, Belgium =

Overslag
- Village
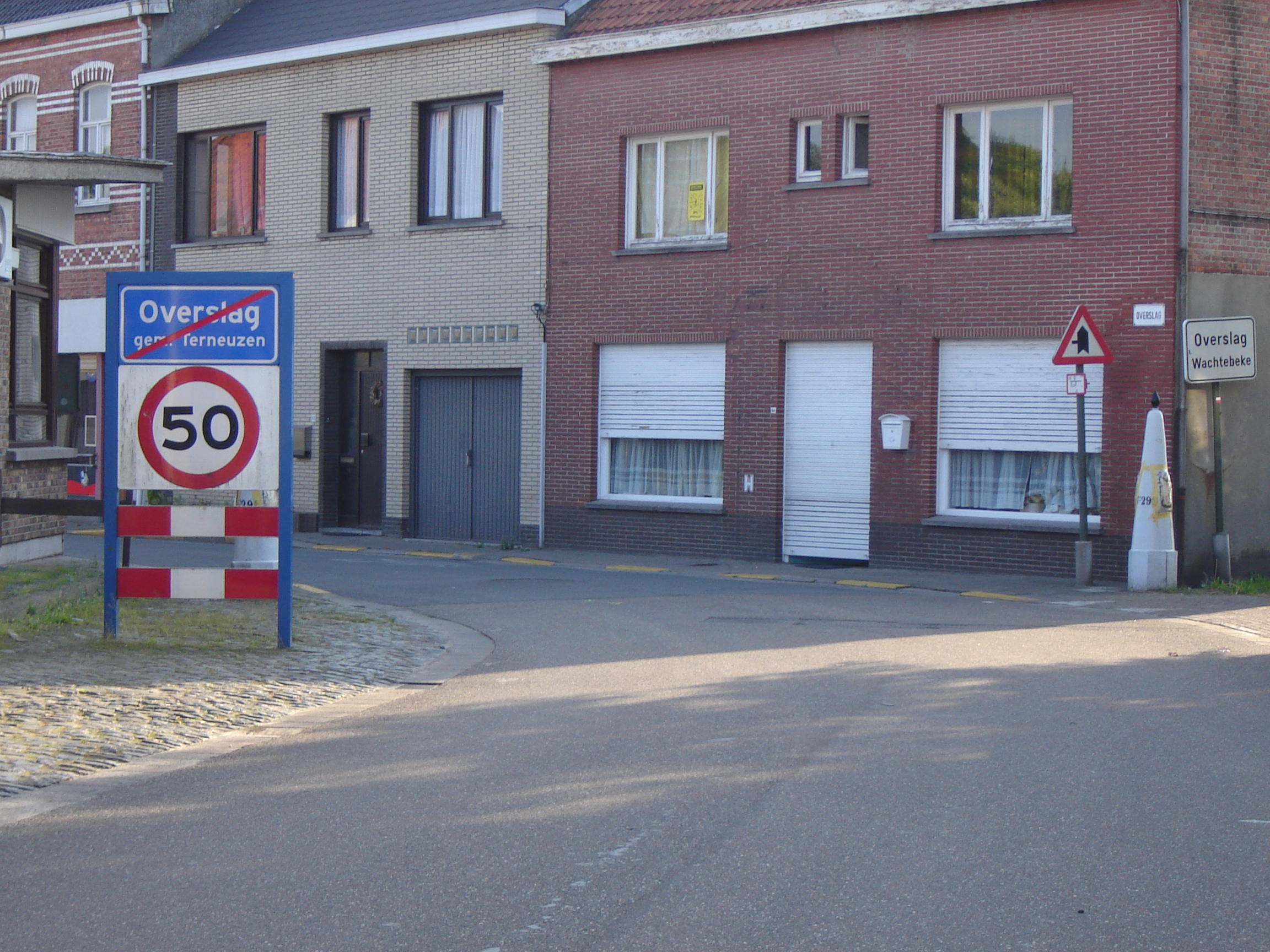
- View on the Belgian side

- Location in Belgium
- Coordinates: 51.2008°N 3.8897°E
- Country: Belgium
- Province: East Flanders
- Municipality: Lochristi

Area
  - Total: 6.34 km^{2} (2.45 sq mi)

Population (2021)
  - Total: 1,055
  - Density: 166/km^{2} (431/sq mi)
- Time zone: CET

Overslag is a village in the municipality of Lochristi in the province of East Flanders in Belgium. The original village was cut in two by the Belgium–Netherlands border. The eponymous village in the Netherlands is part of the municipality of Terneuzen.

== History ==
The village was first mentioned in 1542 as "ten Overslach", and means place where goods could be transferred. It was located where the canal from Axel (Netherlands) and canal from Wachtebeke (Belgium) were close together. In 1547, the Sassevaart was dug and Overslag become obsolete for the transfer of goods. Overslag is a border village which was cut in two by the Belgium–Netherlands border. The parish church is located on the Belgian side. During World War I, it was not possible to completely shut the border and the Wire of Death, a lethal electric fence, ran through the village.

The Onze-Lieve-Vrouw Geboorte Church was built in 1692 as a replacement of a chapel in a barn. A sacristy was added in 1844, and the church was enlarged 1851 and again in 1898 when the tower was added.

== Gallery ==
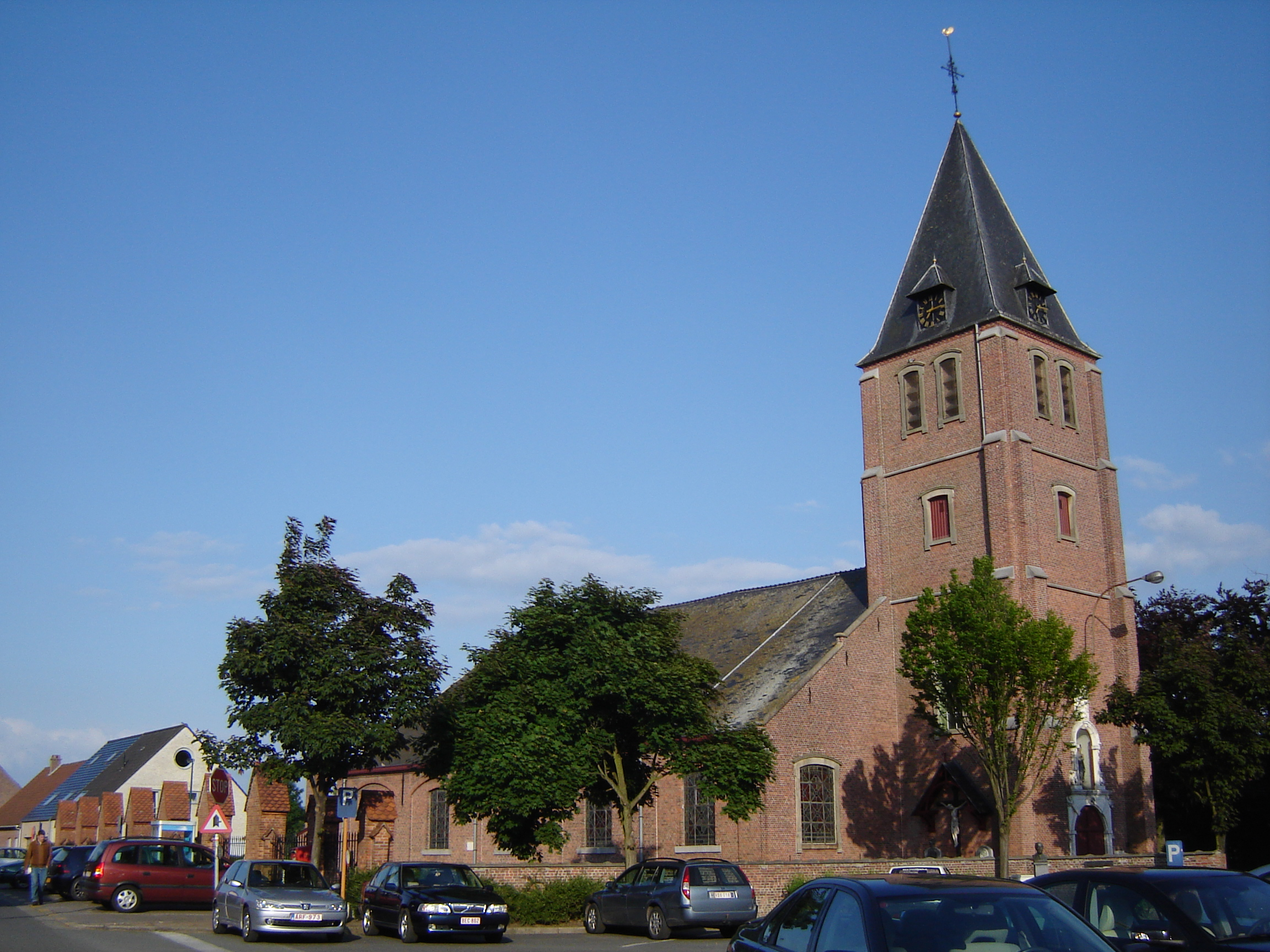
Onze-Lieve-Vrouw Geboorte Church

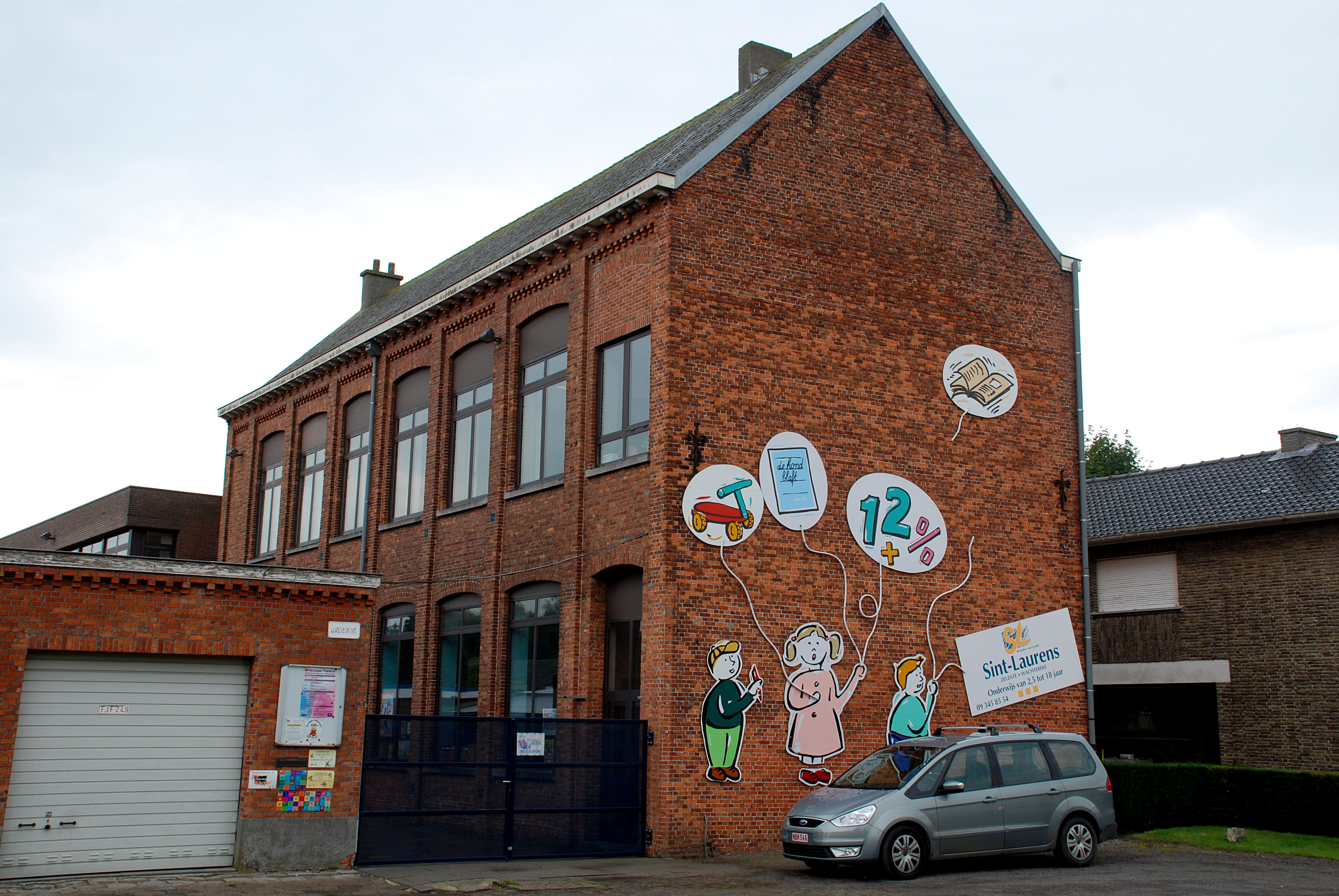
School in Overslag

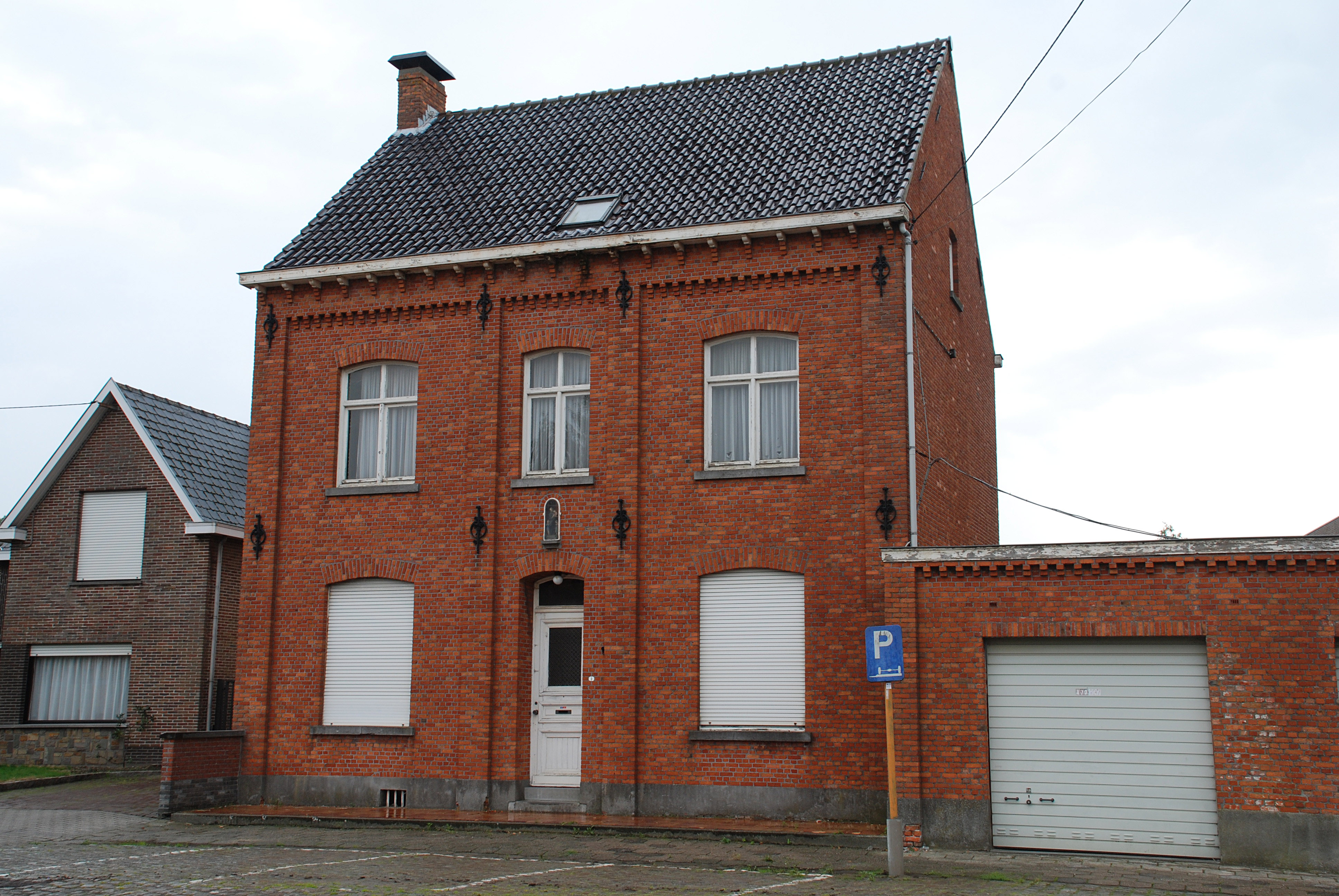
House in Overslag

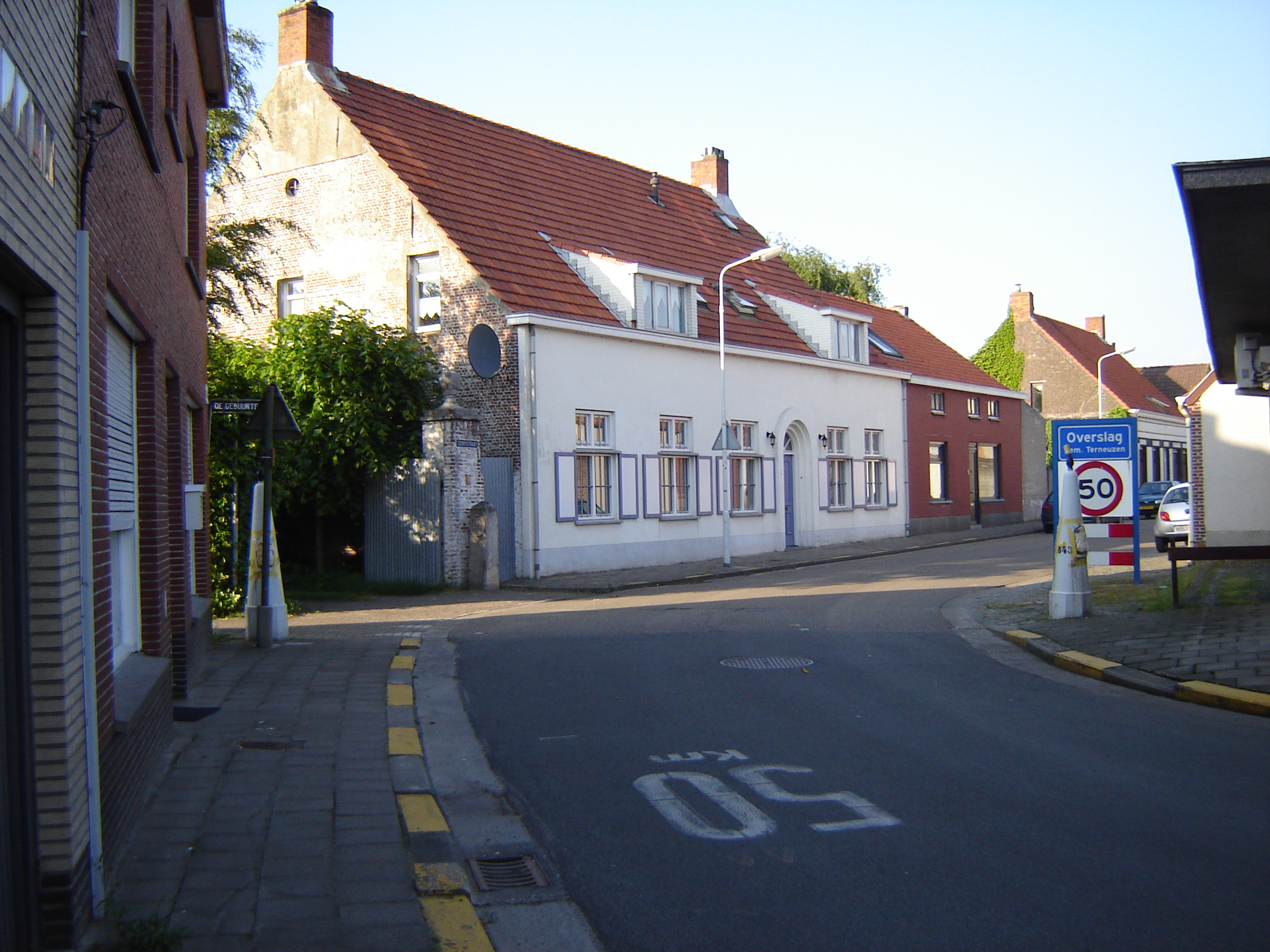
View on the Dutch side
