= Fontaine-l'Évêque Castle =

Castle in Wallonia, Belgium

- Fontaine-l'Évêque, Wallonia, Belgium
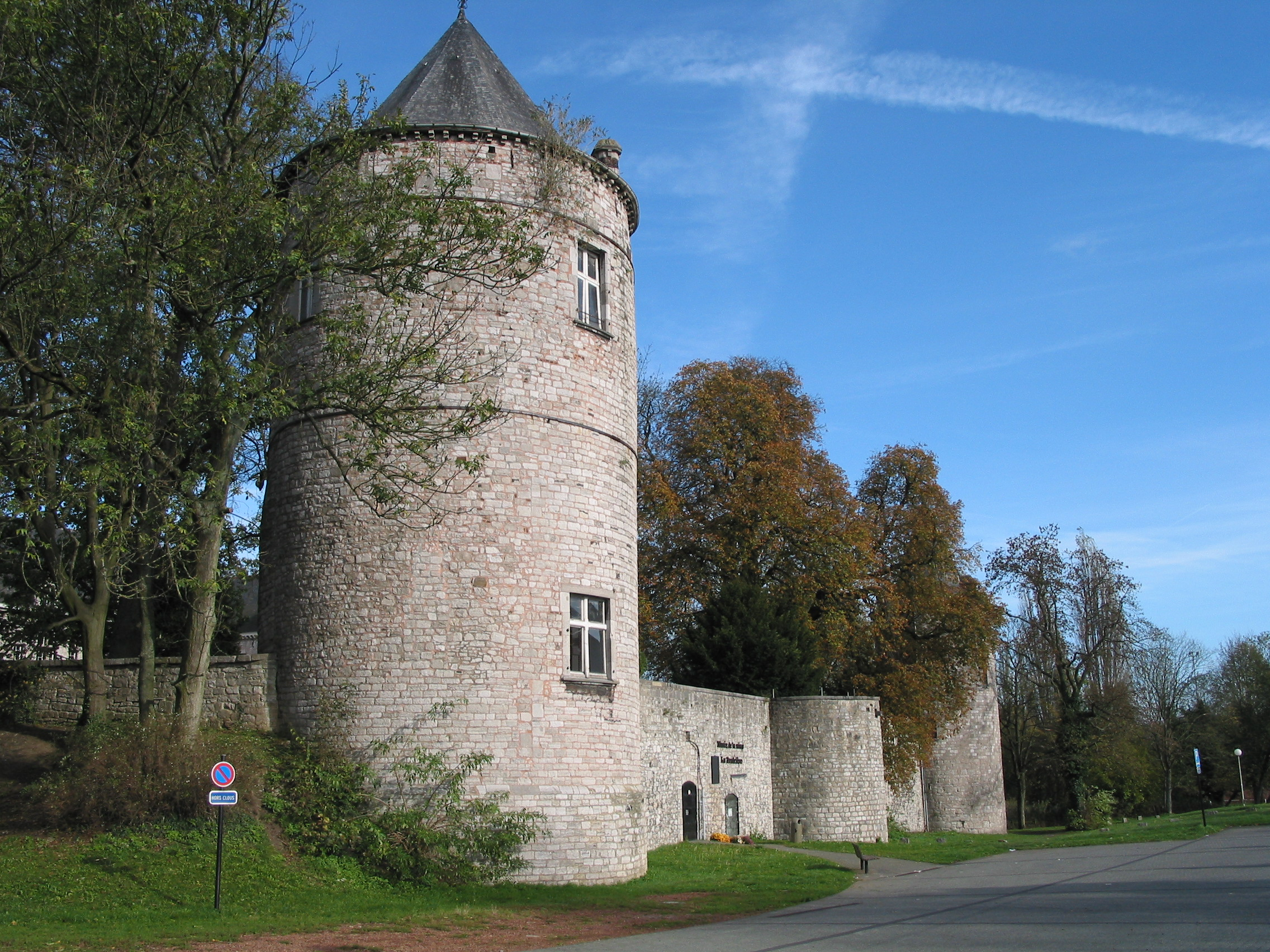

Site information
- Type: Castle

Location
- Coordinates: 50.412°N 4.324°E

Fontaine-l'Évêque Castle (French: Château de Fontaine-l'Évêque, also known as Château Bivort) is a castle in Fontaine-l'Évêque, province of Hainaut, Wallonia, Belgium.

== History ==
The castle was first constructed here by Nicolas de Fontaine in the 13th century. Nicolas's sister, wife of Baudouin de Hennin-Liétard, inherited it, after which it went on to become the property of renowned families such as the Hamals, Herzelles and Rodoans. In the 17th and 18th centuries the castle was completely restored and was given a more refined interior. In the 19th century the Bivort de la Saudée family renovated the castle once more.

== See also ==
- List of castles in Belgium
