= Sint-Kruis-Winkel =

Sub-municipality of the city of Ghent, Belgium

- Sub-municipality of Ghent
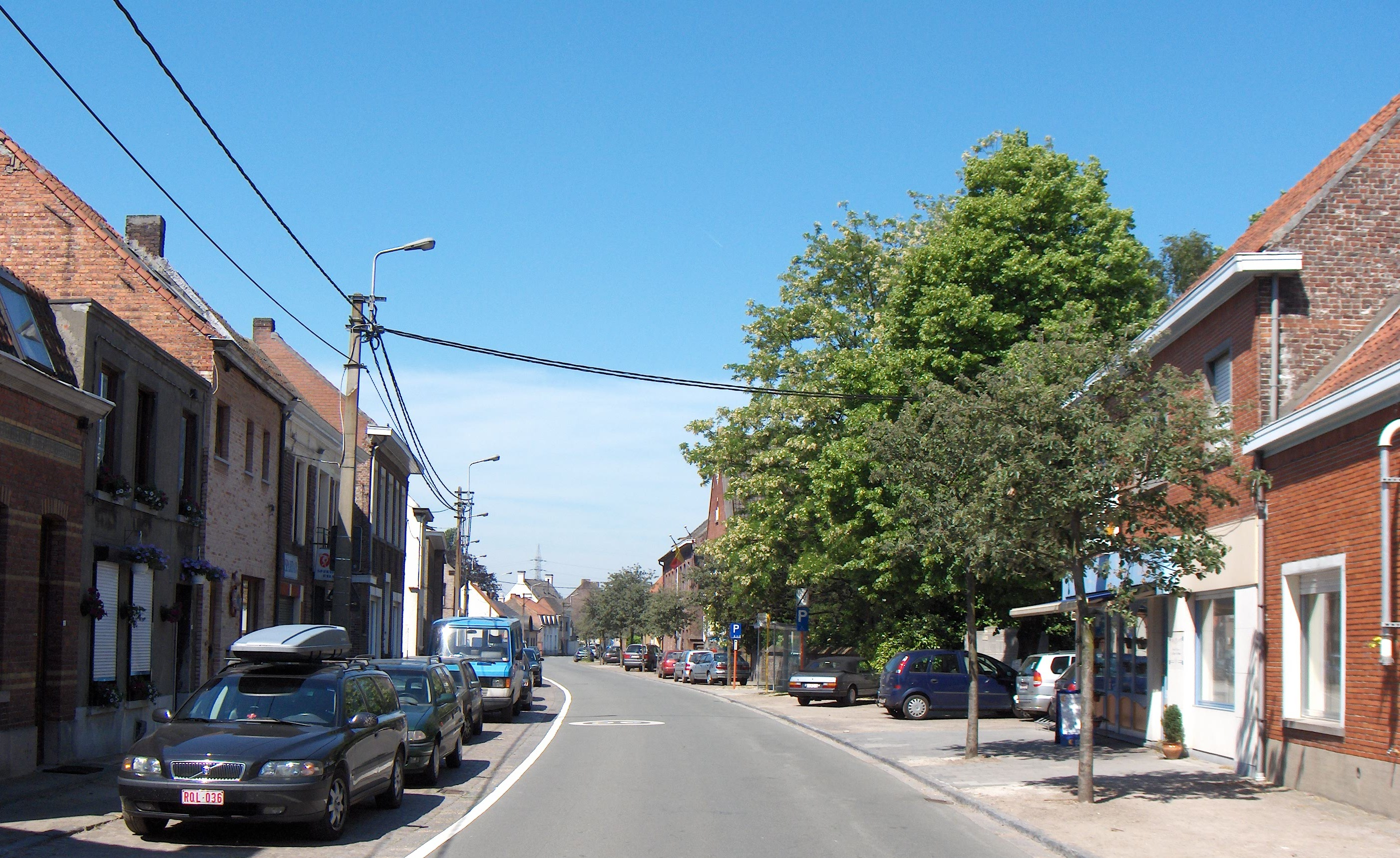
- A street in Sint-Kruis-Winkel

- Location of Sint-Kruis-Winkel in Ghent
- Interactive map of Sint-Kruis-Winkel
- Location within Belgium Location within East Flanders
- Coordinates: 51°09′15″N 3°49′35″E
- Country: Belgium
- Community: Flemish Community
- Region: Flemish Region
- Province: East Flanders
- Arrondissement: Ghent
- Municipality: Ghent

Area
  - Total: 11.79 km^{2} (4.55 sq mi)

Population (2020-01-01)
  - Total: 1,220
  - Density: 103/km^{2} (268/sq mi)
- Postal codes: 9042
- Area codes: 09

Sint-Kruis-Winkel (Dutch: [ˌsɪnt krœys ˈʋɪŋkəl]; French: Winkel-Sainte-Croix) is a sub-municipality of the city of Ghent located in the province of East Flanders, Flemish Region, Belgium. It was a separate municipality until 1965. In 1927, part of the original municipality was already annexed to Ghent. On 1 January 1965, it was merged into Ghent.
