= Wachtebeke =

- Village
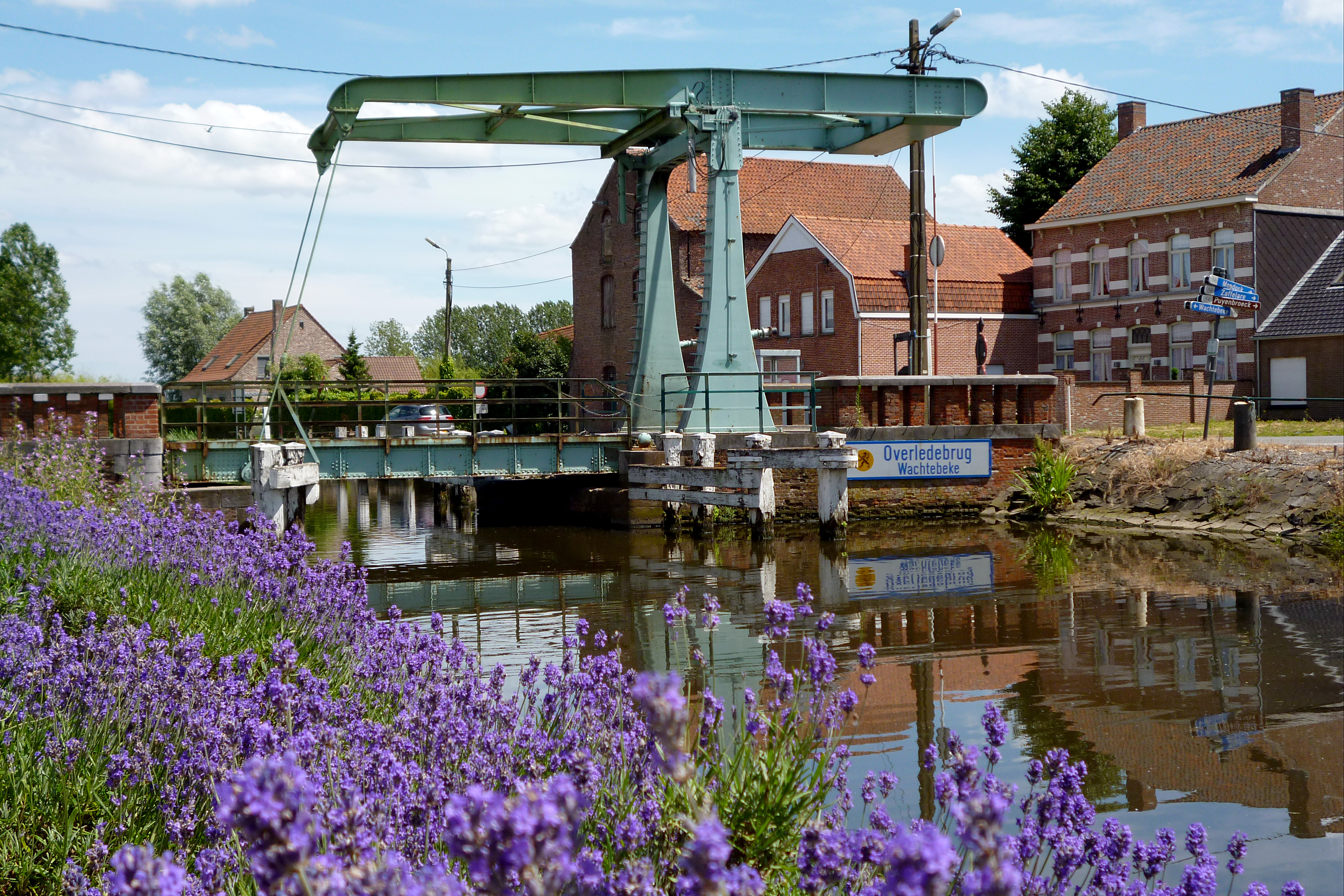

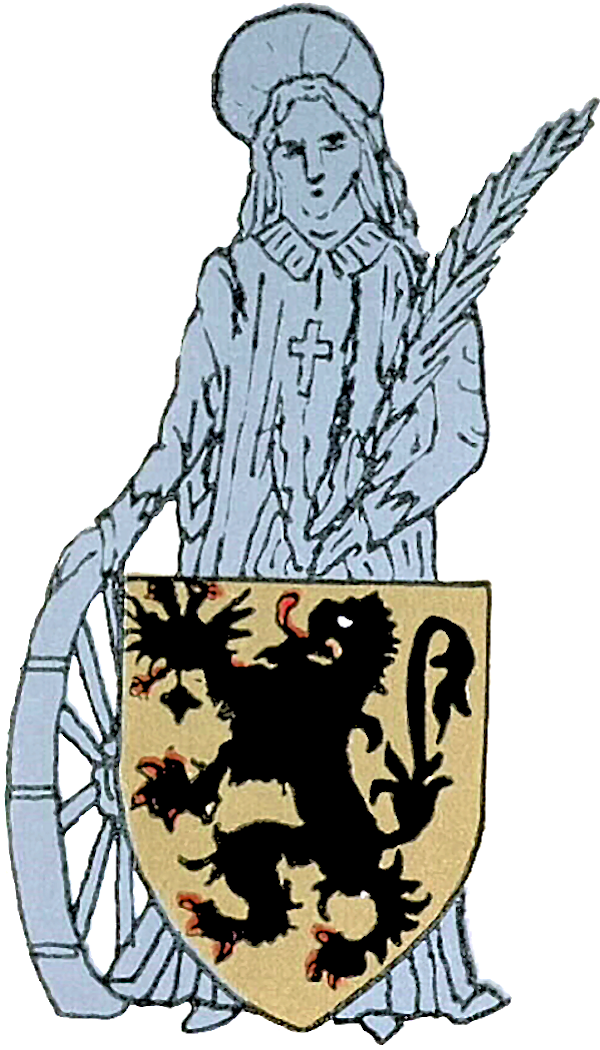
- Flag Coat of arms

- Location of Wachtebeke in East Flanders
- Coordinates: 51°10′N 03°52′E
- Country: Belgium
- Province: East Flanders
- Arrondissement: Ghent
- Municipality: Lochristi

Area
  - Total: 34.53 km^{2} (13.33 sq mi)

Population (2024)
  - Total: 7,897
  - Density: 228.7/km^{2} (592.3/sq mi)
- Postal code: 9185
- Area code: 09
- Website: www.wachtebeke.be

Wachtebeke (Dutch pronunciation: [ˈʋɑxtəˌbeːkə]) is a village in the municipality of Lochristi located in the Belgian province of East Flanders. It includes the main village of Wachtebeke and the border village of Overslag. In 2024, Wachtebeke had a total population of 7,897. The total area is 34.53 km^{2}.

The Langelede is a small canal and corresponding residential street in the town. The neighborhood is slowly migrating from a poor agricultural environment towards a higher middle-class residential area.

In Wachtebeke lies the provincial park Puyenbroeck

Effective 1 January 2025, Wachtebeke has been merged into Lochristi.

== People from Wachtebeke ==
- Bart De Pauw was born in Wachtebeke
- Jonas Geirnaert, animated film maker and comedian
- Lieven Scheire, comedian

== Neighboring villages ==
1. Moerbeke (Lokeren)
2. Eksaarde (Lokeren)
3. Zaffelare (Lochristi)
4. Mendonk (Gent)
5. Sint-Kruis-Winkel (Gent)
6. Zelzate
