= Leernes =

Coordinates: 50°23′50″N 4°19′54″E

Leernes (Walloon: Liene-e-Hinnot) is a village of Wallonia and a district of the municipality of Fontaine-l'Évêque, located in the province of Hainaut, Belgium.

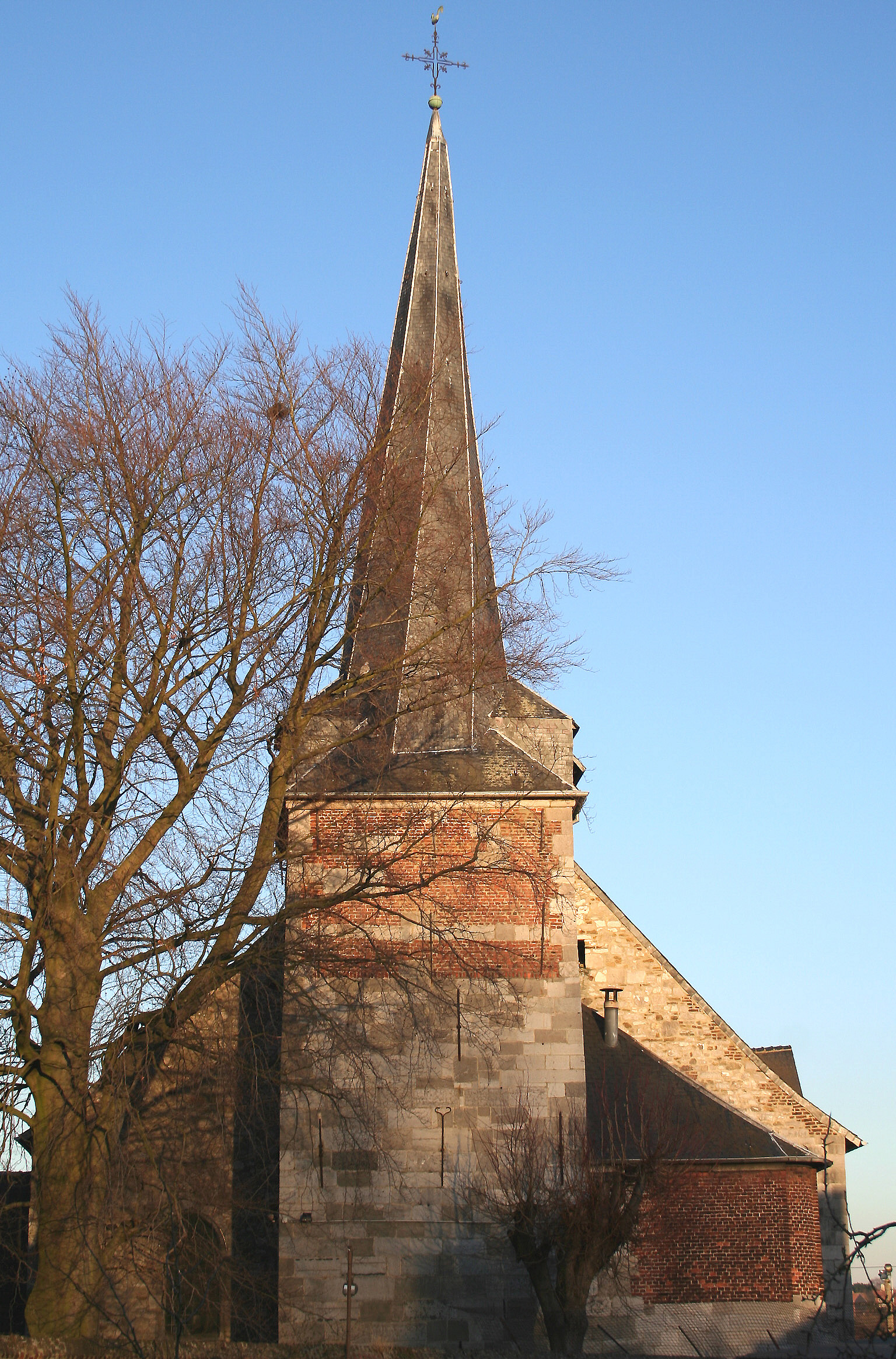
Church of Saint-Martin

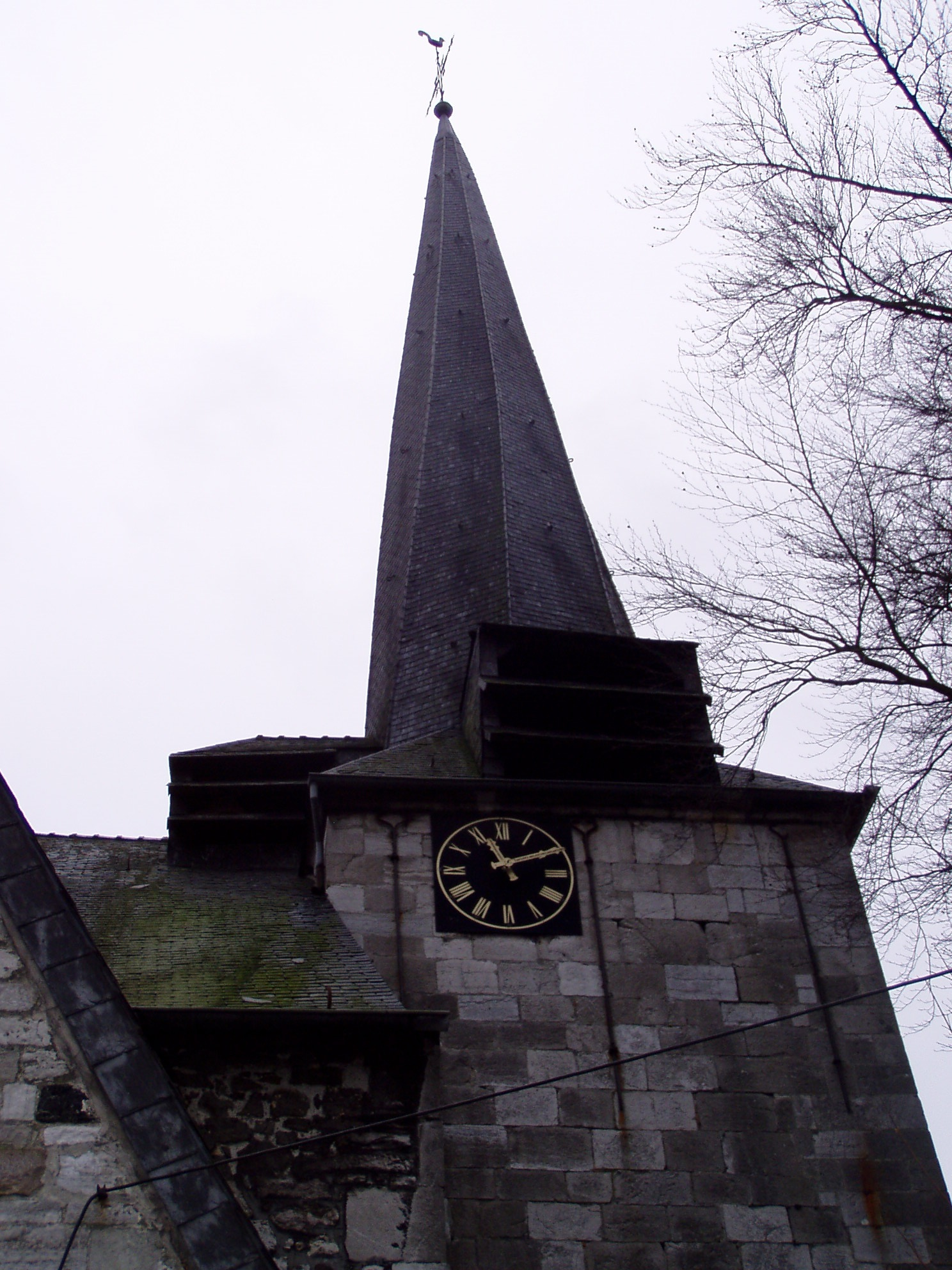
Church of Saint-Martin's crooked spire
