= Lochristi =

- Municipality
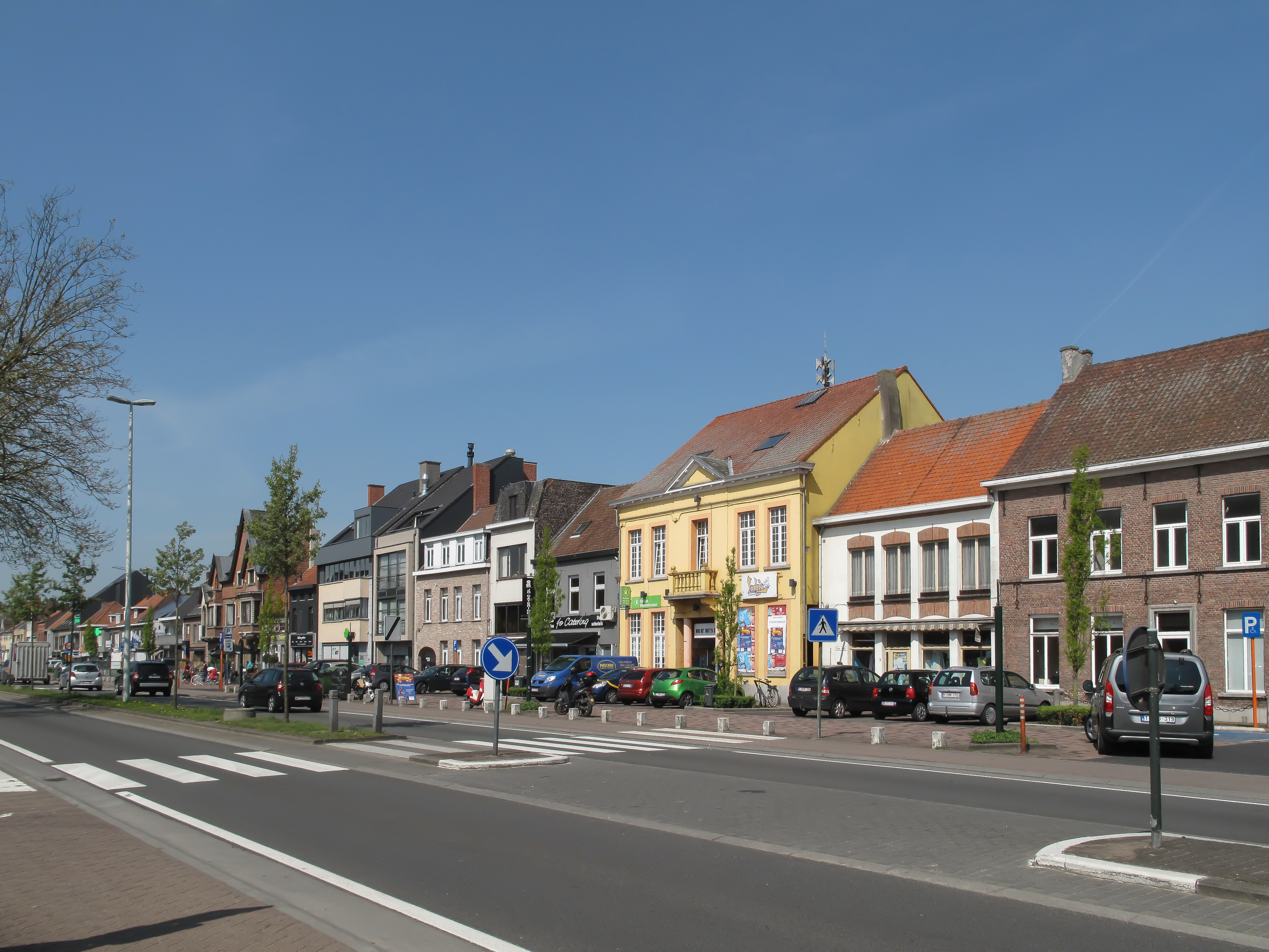

- Flag Coat of arms

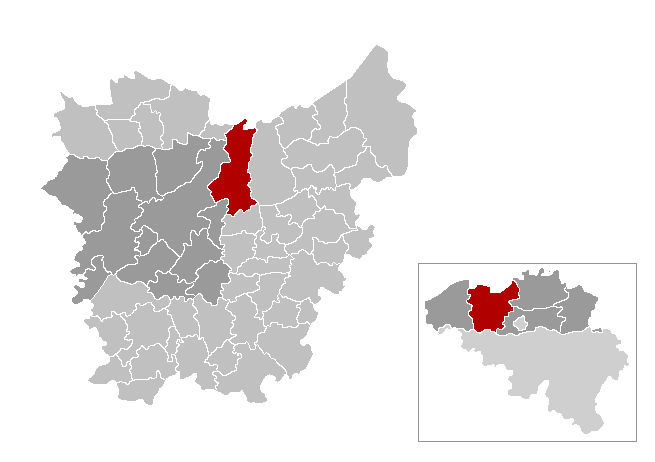
- Location of Lochristi in East Flanders
- Interactive map of Lochristi
- Location in Belgium
- Coordinates: 51°06′N 03°50′E
- Country: Belgium
- Community: Flemish Community
- Region: Flemish Region
- Province: East Flanders
- Arrondissement: Ghent

Government
  - Mayor: Yves Deswaene (Open VLD )
  - Governing party: Open VLD

Area
  - Total: 95.29 km^{2} (36.79 sq mi)

Population (2018-01-01)
  - Total: 22,300
  - Density: 234/km^{2} (606/sq mi)
- Postal codes: 9080,9185
- NIS code: 44087
- Area codes: 09
- Website: www.lochristi.be

Lochristi (Dutch pronunciation: [loːˈkrɪsti]) is a municipality located in the Belgian province of East Flanders. The municipality is composed of the towns of Beervelde, Lochristi proper, Zaffelare, Zeveneken and Wachtebeke. As of 2025, Lochristi had a total population of 30,925. The total area is 94.87 km^{2} (36.63 sq mi).

== Notable people ==
- Kwinten Clappaert (born 1988), footballer

== Gallery ==
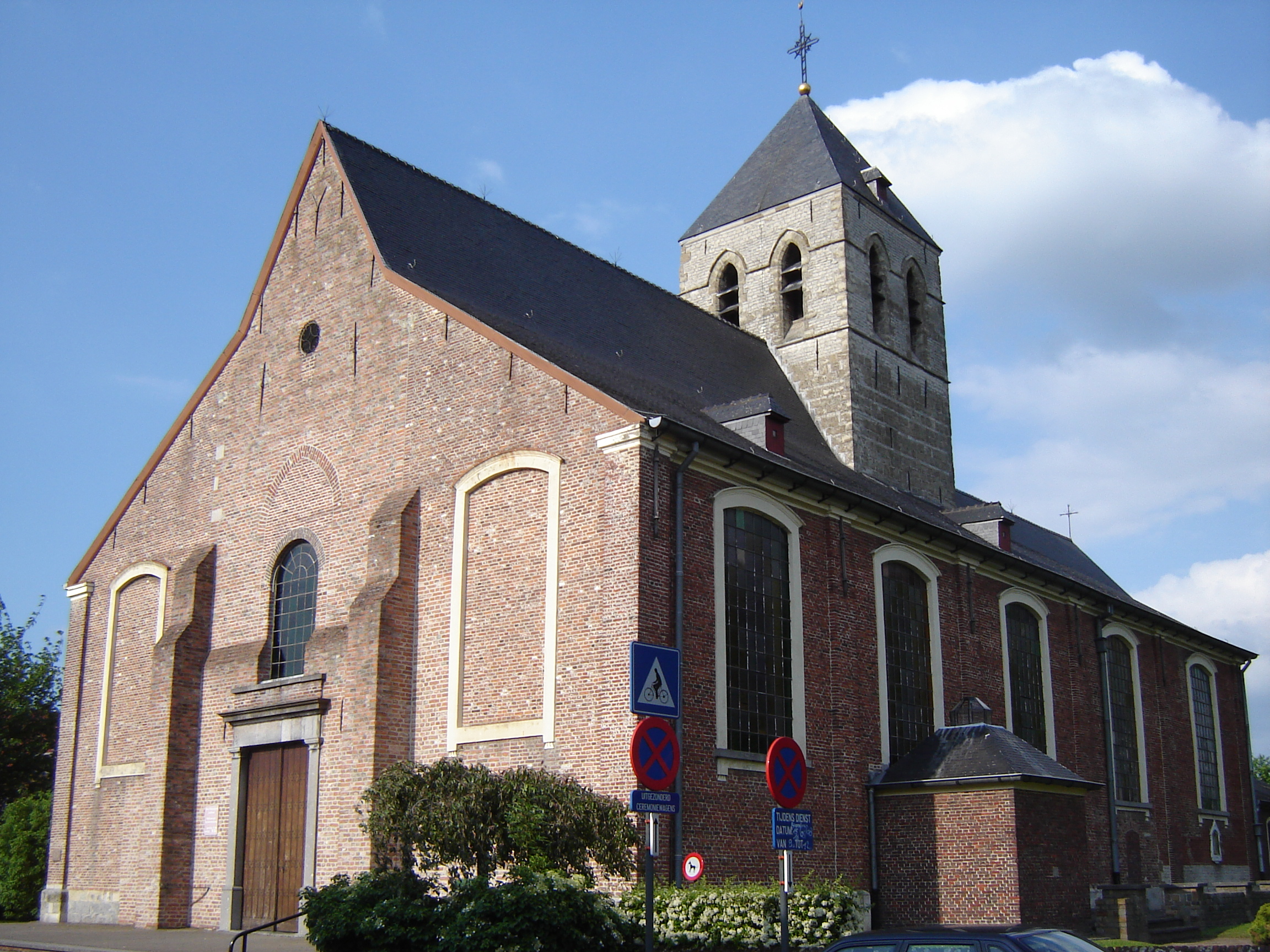
Sint-Niklaaskerk

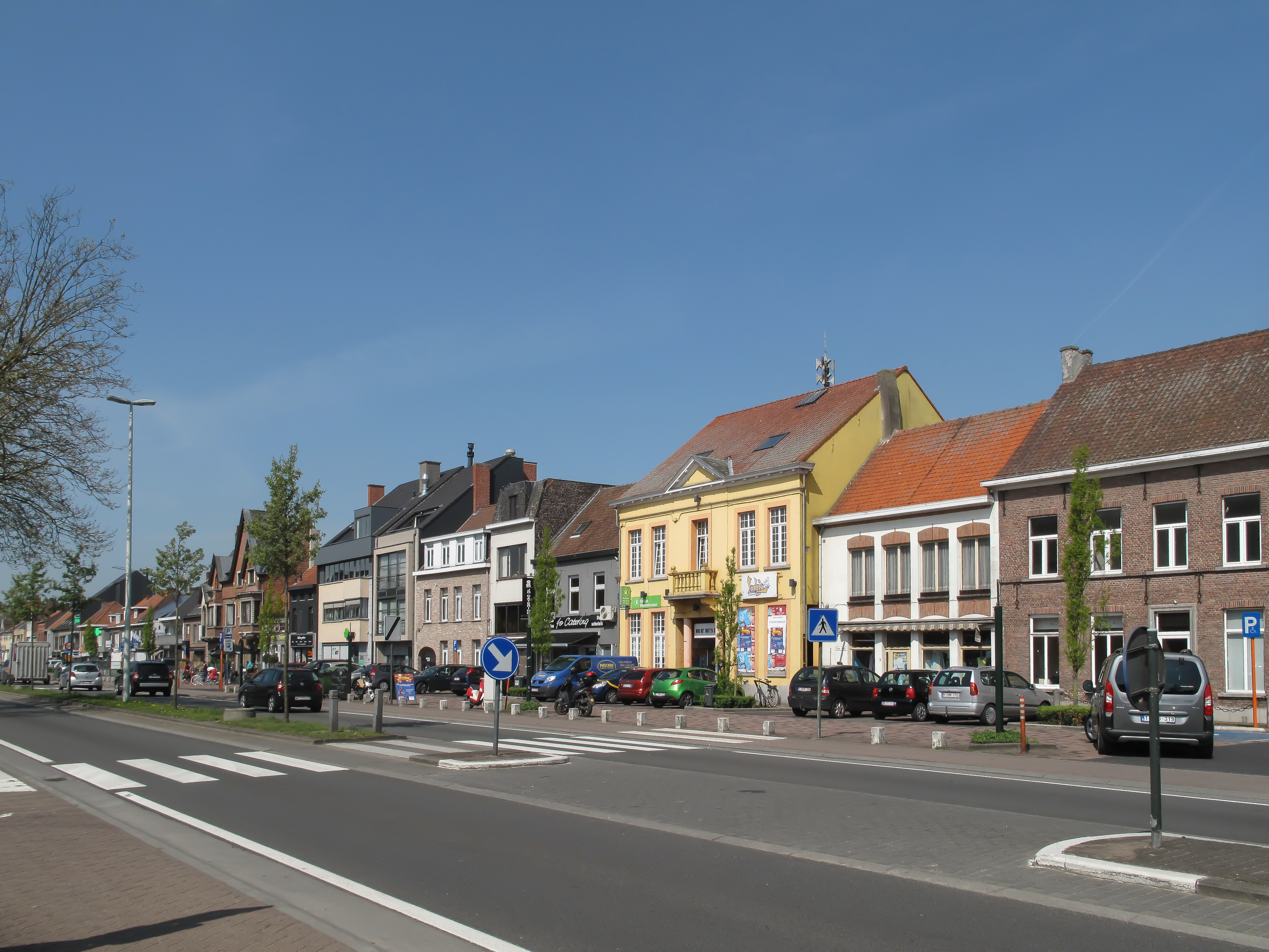
Street view

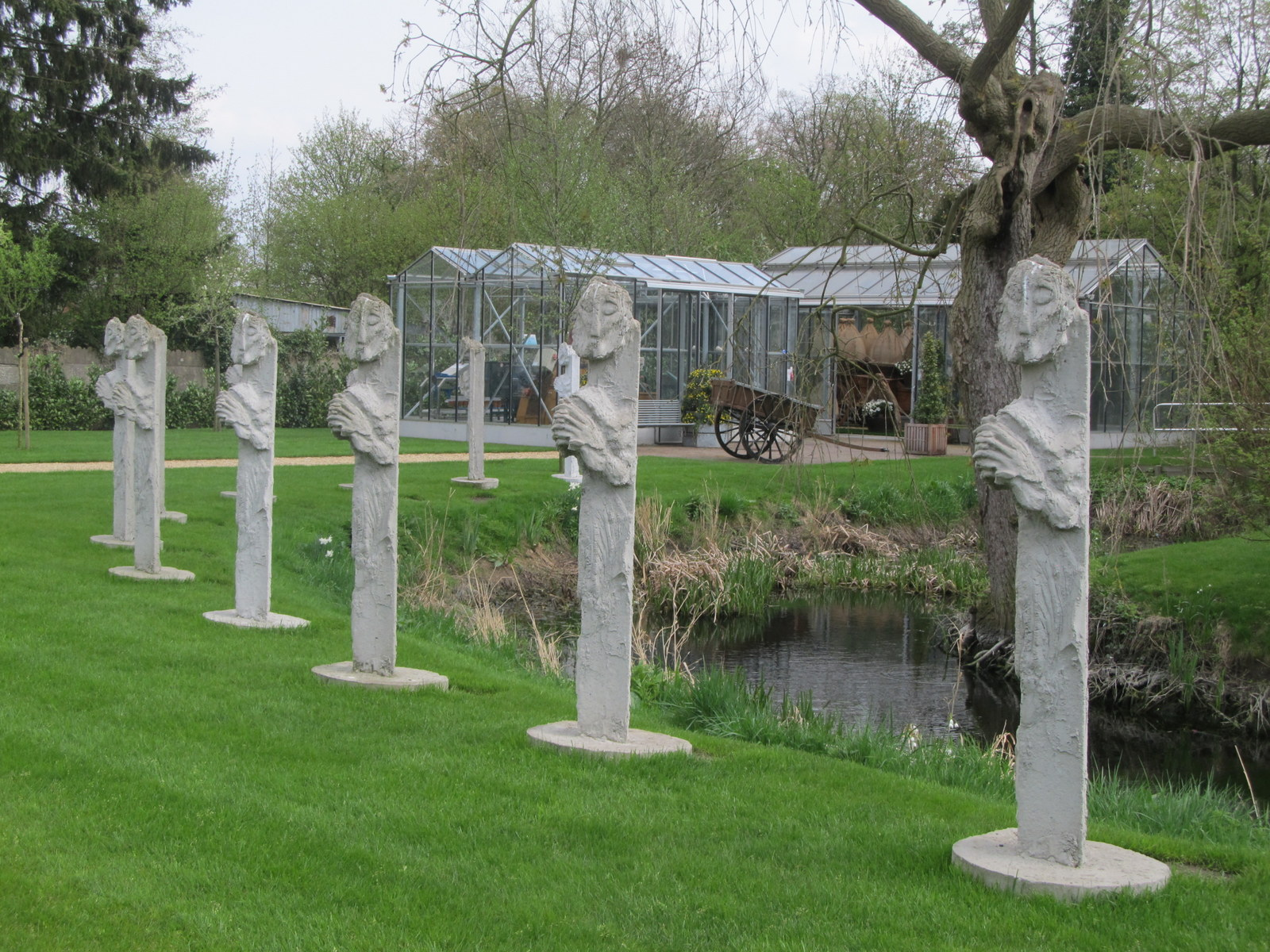
Museum

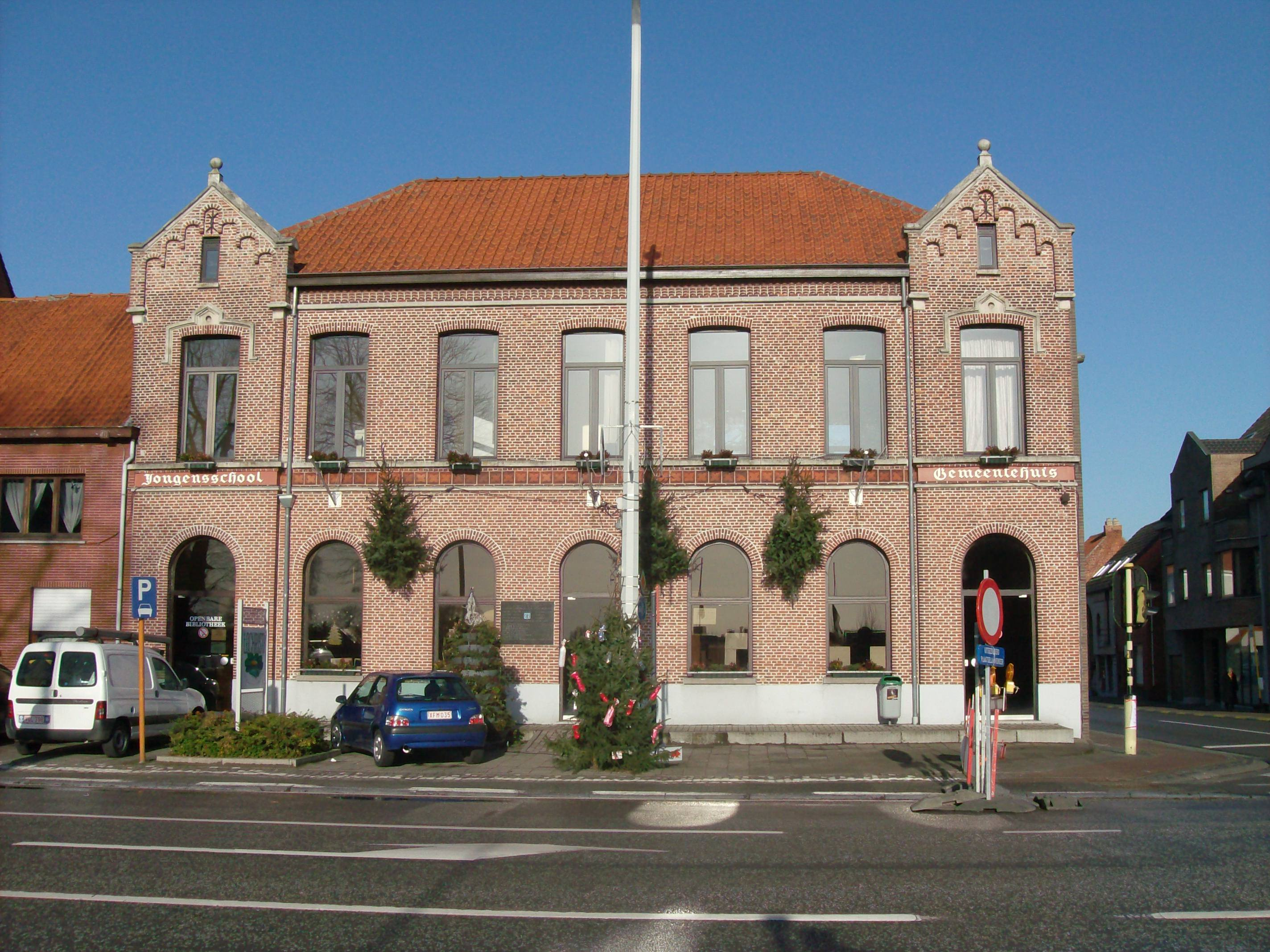
Library
