= Fontaine-l'Évêque =

City in Hainaut Province, Wallonia, Belgium

Fontaine-l'Évêque Fontinne-l'-Eveke (Walloon)
- Municipality
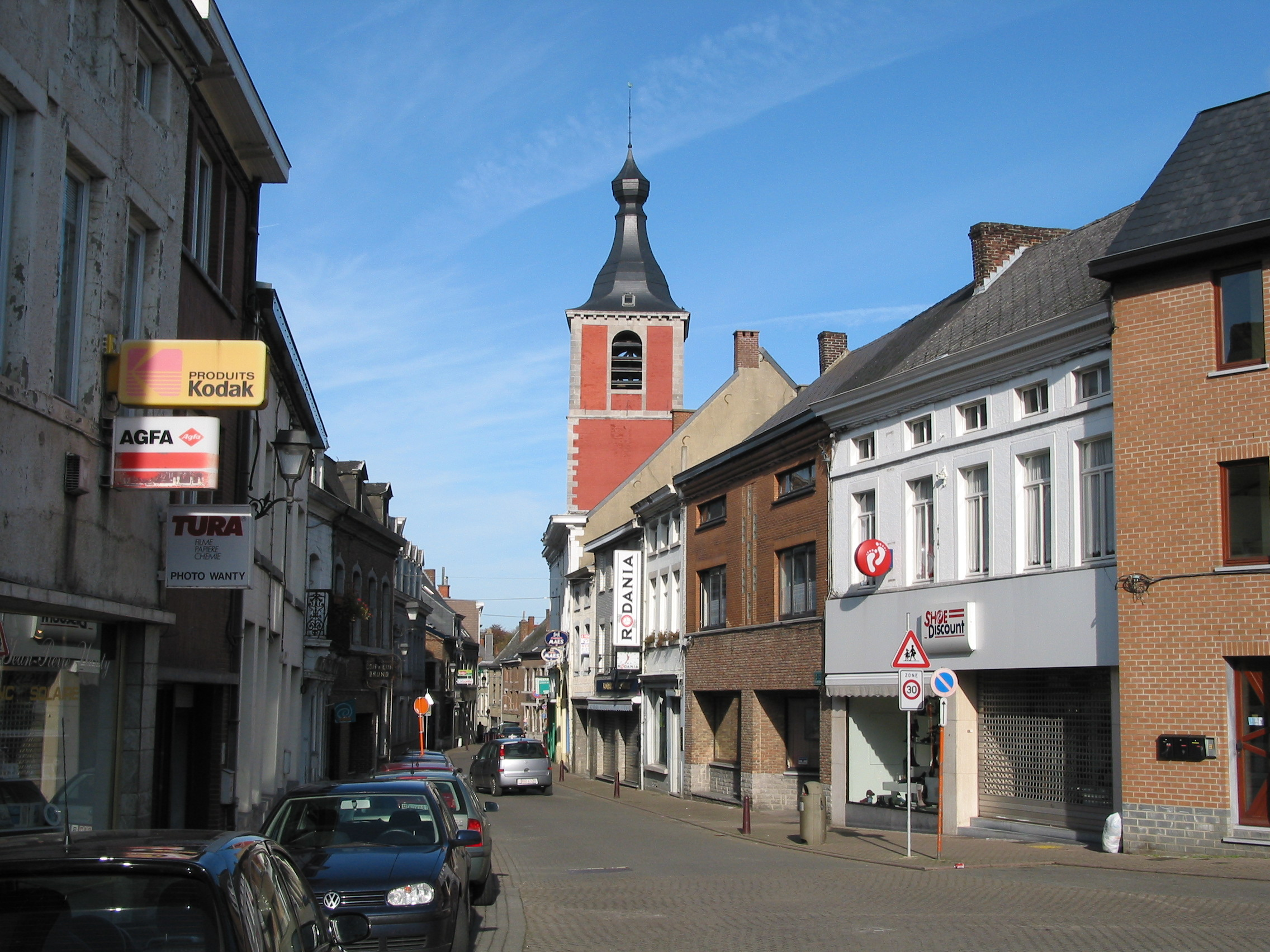

- Flag Coat of arms

- Location of Fontaine-l'Évêque in Hainaut
- Interactive map of Fontaine-l'Évêque
- Location in Belgium
- Coordinates: 50°25′N 04°19′E
- Country: Belgium
- Community: French Community
- Region: Wallonia
- Province: Hainaut
- Arrondissement: Charleroi

Government
  - Mayor: Gianni Galluzzo (PS)
  - Governing party: PS - Mieux Demain

Area
  - Total: 28.66 km^{2} (11.07 sq mi)

Population (2018-01-01)
  - Total: 17,801
  - Density: 621.1/km^{2} (1,609/sq mi)
- Postal codes: 6140-6142
- NIS code: 52022
- Area codes: 071
- Website: www.fontaine-leveque.be

Fontaine-l'Évêque (French pronunciation: [fɔ̃tɛn levɛk]; Walloon: Fontinne-l'-Eveke) is a city and municipality of Wallonia located in the province of Hainaut, Belgium.

On January 1, 2006, Fontaine-l'Évêque had a total population of 16,687. The total area is 28.41 km^{2} which gives a population density of 587 inhabitants per km^{2}.

The municipality consists of the following districts: Fontaine-l'Évêque, Forchies-la-Marche, and Leernes.

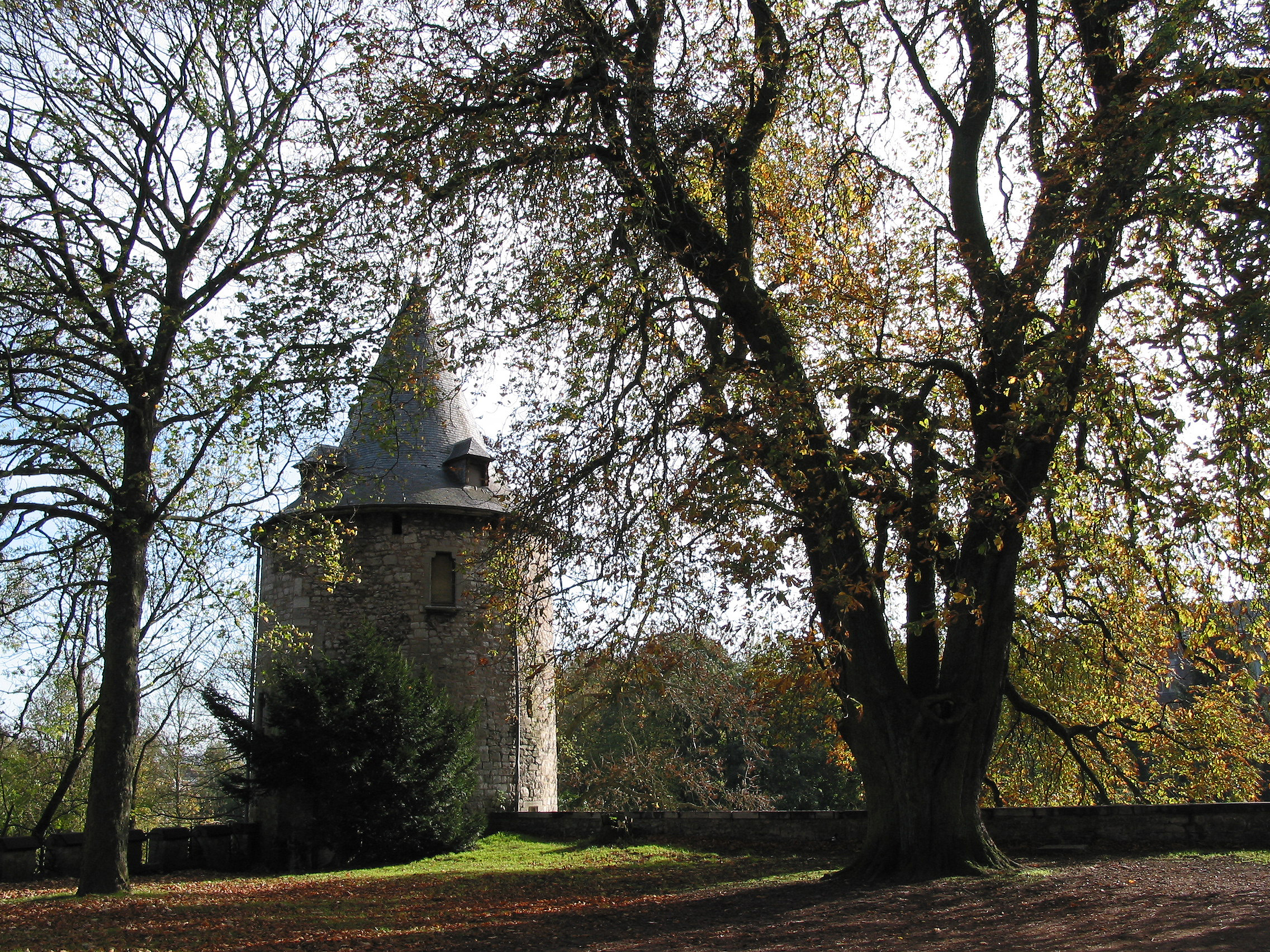
Fontaine-l'Évêque Castle, once the castle of the de Fontaines
