= John Oldrid Scott =

British architect (1841–1913)

- Born: 17 July 1841
- Died: 30 May 1913 (aged 71); Bexhill-on-Sea, England
- Occupation: Architect
- Spouse(s): Mary Ann, née Stevens
- Children: Charles Marriott Oldrid Scott; Henry George Scott, John Stevens Scott (24 May 1869)
- Parent(s): Sir George Gilbert Scott and Caroline née Oldrid

John Oldrid Scott (17 July 1841 – 30 May 1913) was a British architect.

== Biography ==
He was the son of George Gilbert Scott and his wife Caroline (née Oldrid). His brother George Gilbert Scott Junior and nephew Sir Giles Gilbert Scott were also prominent architects.

He was educated at Bradfield College and in 1868 he married Mary Ann Stevens, eldest daughter of the Reverend Thomas Stevens, founder of the school. One of his nine children, Charles Marriott Oldrid Scott, worked in his architectural practice.

At the end of his career he lived in Peasmarsh, near Rye, East Sussex, and the sale of his farmhouse and 136 acres was mentioned in the national press in 1928.

== Works ==
- St Stephen's Greek Orthodox Chapel, West Norwood Cemetery: started circa 1873
- St Peter's Church, Clayworth, Nottinghamshire: restoration 1874–75
- St Michael and All Angels' Church, Stourport-on-Severn, Worcestershire: continuation of church designed by his father Sir G. G. Scott but unfinished at his death in 1881. Partly demolished and replaced by a new church.
- St Thomas' Church, Osbaldwick: restoration 1877–1878

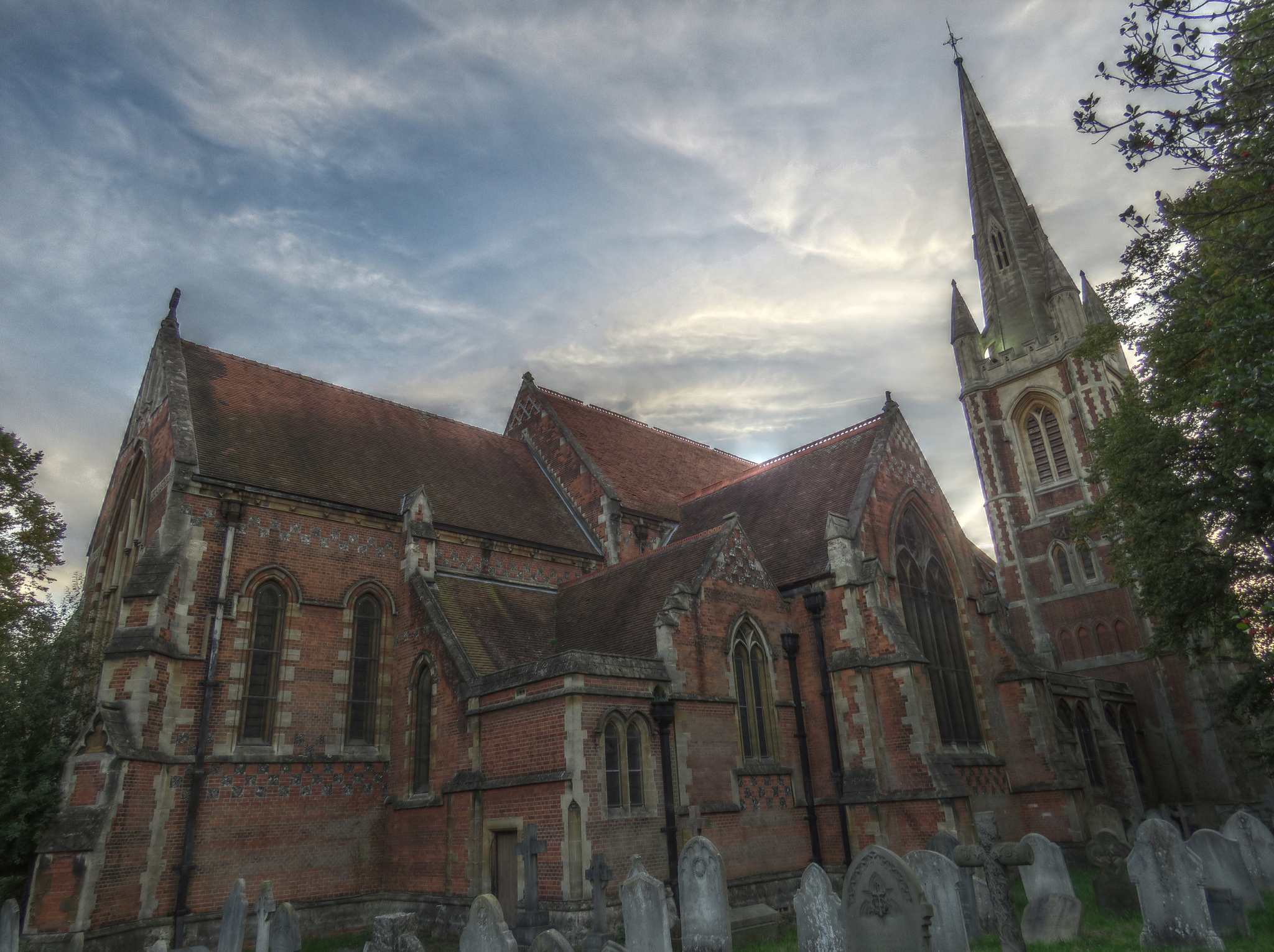
St Mary's Parish Church, Slough

- St Mary's Church, Slough: construction completed 1878, subsequently extended 1911–13

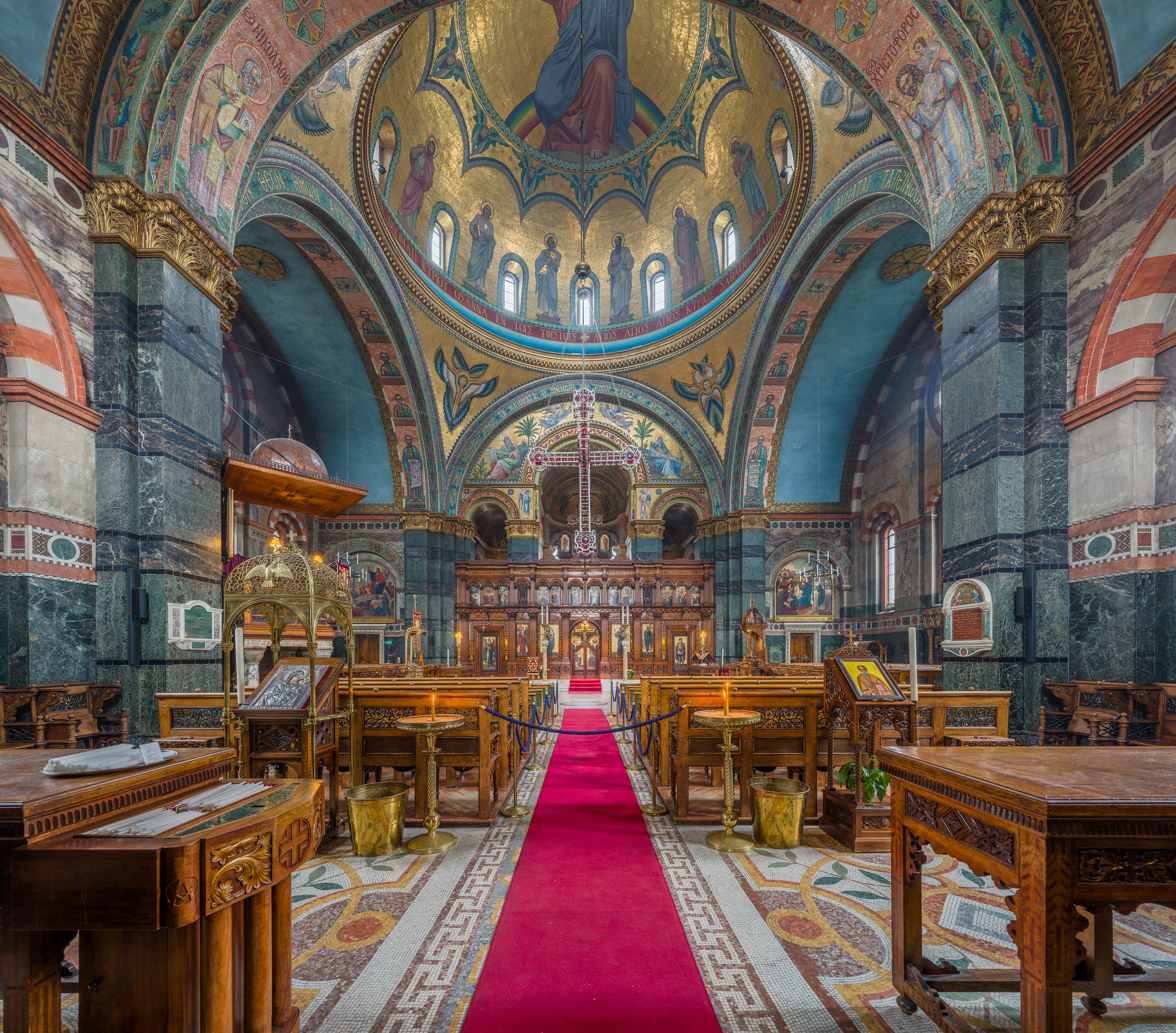
Interior of St Sophia's Greek Orthodox Cathedral, Bayswater

- St Sophia's Greek Orthodox Cathedral, Bayswater, London: 1878–79
- St Mary's Church, Hayes, Kent: south aisle and transept, 1878–79
- St Thomas of Canterbury Church, Chester: completion of nave, 1881
- University College Boathouse, Oxford: 1880–81 (destroyed by fire 1999)
- St Laurence's Church, Frodsham, Cheshire: organ case, 1882
- St Bartholomew's Church, Hints, Staffordshire: 1882–83
- St John the Baptist's Church, Halesowen, West Midlands: outer south aisle, 1883
- St Mary the Virgin's Church, Adderbury, Oxfordshire: restoration, 1886
- Cathedral Church of the Resurrection, Lahore: 1887
- Church of St Giles, Stoke Poges, Buckinghamshire: lychgate, 1887
- St John the Baptist's Church, Alkborough, Lincolnshire: chancel rebuilt, 1887
- St John the Baptist's Church, Croydon: Organ case, other interior designs 1888
- Mary the Virgin's Church, Thame, Oxfordshire: restoration, 1889–97
- St Mary and St Peter’s Church, Harlaxton, Lincolnshire: restoration, 1890–91
- St Denys' Church, Northmoor, Oxfordshire: rectory, 1891
- St John the Baptist's Church, Kinlet, Shropshire: restoration, 1892, and design of monument to Major CB Childe (killed 1900)

St John the Evangelist's church, Boscombe

- St John the Evangelist's Church, Boscombe, Dorset: 1893–95 (with CT Miles)
- St George the Martyr's Church, New Wolverton, Buckinghamshire: transepts, 1894
- St Philip's Church, Hove: 1894–95
- St Alkmund's Church, Duffield, Derbyshire: restoration, 1896–97
- The Bute Hall, University of Glasgow: late 19th-century
- St Mark's Church, Harrogate, West Riding: 1898
- St Nicholas' Church, Piddington, Oxfordshire: restoration, 1898
- St Michael's Church, Bournemouth, Dorset: tower, 1900–01
- St Mary the Virgin's Church, Denby, Derbyshire: restoration, 1901–03
- St Giles' Church, Wendlebury, Oxfordshire: restoration, 1902
- Hereford Cathedral: west front, 1902–08

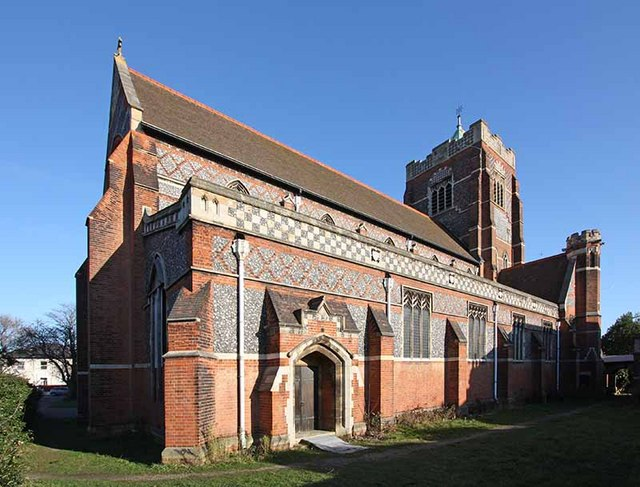
St John the Evangelist's church, Palmers Green

- St John the Evangelist's Church, Palmers Green, Middlesex: 1903–08
- St Mary and St Nicholas' Church, Compton, Berkshire: north aisle, 1905
- St Albans Cathedral, Hertfordshire: organ case, 1905
- St George the Martyr's Sunday School & Church Institute Building, New Wolverton, Buckinghamshire: 1907–08
- St Andrew's Church, Boscombe, Dorset, 1908 (then Hampshire)
- St Mary's Church, Princes Risborough, Buckinghamshire: rebuilding of west tower and spire, 1907–08
- St Michael and St George Cathedral, Grahamstown, South Africa: chancel and nave, dedicated 1912
- St James's Church, Milton, Hampshire 1911–13
- Church of All Saints, Southbourne, 1914

== Sources and further reading ==
- Brodie, Antonia; Felstead, Alison; Franklin, Jonathan; Pinfield, Leslie, eds. (2001). Directory of British Architects 1834–1914. Vol. L–Z. London & New York: Continuum. ISBN 082645514X.
- Francis, Peter (2013). Shropshire War Memorials, Sites of Remembrance. YouCaxton Publications. p. 47. ISBN 978-1-909644-11-3.
- Newman, John (1976) [1969]. West Kent and the Weald. The Buildings of England. Harmondsworth: Penguin Books. p. 318. ISBN 0-14-071038-8.
- Pevsner, Nikolaus (1958). Shropshire. The Buildings of England. Harmondsworth: Penguin Books. p. 160.
- Pevsner, Nikolaus (1960). Buckinghamshire. The Buildings of England. Harmondsworth: Penguin Books. pp. 225, 300. ISBN 0-14-071019-1.
- Pevsner, Nikolaus (1963). Herefordshire. The Buildings of England. Harmondsworth: Penguin Books. pp. 146, 153. ISBN 0-14-071025-6.
- Pevsner, Nikolaus (1966). Berkshire. The Buildings of England. Harmondsworth: Penguin Books. p. 120.
- Pevsner, Nikolaus (1968). Worcestershire. The Buildings of England. Harmondsworth: Penguin Books. pp. 180, 271.
- Pevsner, Nikolaus (1974). Staffordshire. The Buildings of England. Harmondsworth: Penguin Books. p. 148. ISBN 0-14-071046-9.
- Pevsner, Nikolaus; Cherry, Bridget (revision) (1977) [1953]. Hertfordshire. The Buildings of England (2nd ed.). Harmondsworth: Penguin Books. p. 307. ISBN 0-14-071007-8.
- Pevsner, Nikolaus; Harris, John (1964). Lincolnshire. The Buildings of England. Harmondsworth: Penguin Books. p. 168.
- Pevsner, Nikolaus; Hubbard, Edward (1971). Cheshire. The Buildings of England. Harmondsworth: Penguin Books. p. 171. ISBN 0-14-071042-6.
- Pevsner, Nikolaus; Lloyd, David (1967). Hampshire and the Isle of Wight. The Buildings of England. Harmondsworth: Penguin Books. p. 124.
- Pevsner, Nikolaus; Radcliffe, Enid (revision) (1967) [1959]. Yorkshire the West Riding. The Buildings of England. Harmondsworth: Penguin Books. p. 248. ISBN 0-14-071017-5.
- Pevsner, Nikolaus; Williamson, Elizabeth (revision) (1978) [1953]. Derbyshire. The Buildings of England (2nd ed.). Harmondsworth: Penguin Books. pp. 165, 201. ISBN 0-14-071008-6.
- Pevsner, Nikolaus; Williamson, Elizabeth (revision) (1979) [1951]. Nottinghamshire. The Buildings of England (2nd ed.). Harmondsworth: Penguin Books. p. 98. ISBN 0-14-071002-7.
- Sherwood, Jennifer; Pevsner, Nikolaus (1974). Oxfordshire. The Buildings of England. Harmondsworth: Penguin Books. pp. 83, 274, 413, 723, 731, 806, 832. ISBN 0-14-071045-0.
