= Eric Fogg =

British composer and conductor

Charles William Eric Fogg (21 February 1903 – 19 December 1939) was an English composer, conductor and BBC broadcaster. His early works were influenced by Igor Stravinsky, though his later pieces owe more to Granville Bantock and Richard Strauss and even William Walton. Much of his music has been lost.

== Education and early composition ==
Fogg was born in Manchester, the son of Charles H. Fogg (1869-1927), organist for 35 years with the Hallé Orchestra, who was his first teacher. His mother, Madame Sadler-Fogg, was also musical (she trained the young Isobel Baillie in singing) and contributed to his musical education. He became a boy chorister at Manchester Cathedral from ages 10 to 14 where he came under the influence of Sydney Nicholson and Ernest Bullock. His contemporaries there included Leslie Heward and Eric Warr. Fogg went on to study with Granville Bantock in Birmingham and served for two years as organist at St John's, Deansgate.

Fogg started composing very early and his output was considerable. An early version of his orchestral work Sea Sheen received its first run through by an amateur orchestra in Colne as early as 1917, with the fourteen year old composer conducting. However, two years later he burned most of his early compositions and started again. Despite this, by 30 March 1920 some 25 of his works were ready to be given a hearing at a British Music Society event. By the age of 18 his catalogue numbered some 57 works.

== Career ==
Fogg's name first reached a wider audience when he appeared at a Queen's Hall Prom concert on 21 September 1920 to conduct his Golden Butterfly ballet suite, op 40. On 16 June 1921, his "Chinese suite" The Golden Valley (1919) was premiered by Adrian Boult with the Queen's Hall Orchestra at the Royal College of Music, in the same concert as the first and only performance of Ivor Gurney's War Elegy.

He joined the BBC in Manchester in 1924 as an accompanist, rising to assistant music director under T H Morrison. In the 1930s he was well known as "Uncle Eric" of the radio programme Children's Favourites. He succeeded Archie Camden as the conductor of the Manchester Schoolchildren's Orchestra. In 1934 he moved to London and became musical director of the BBC's Empire Service (now the BBC World Service), where he founded the Empire Orchestra of 22 players in December 1934.

After this time his composition work tailed off due to pressure of other work, which included conducting the Empire Orchestra five times a week, mostly in the early mornings and late at night. In 1935 he conducted the orchestra in the first performance of Peggy Glanville-Hicks's Sinfonietta in D minor for small orchestra.

== Personal life and death ==
Eric Fogg's first wife was the cellist Kathleen Moorhouse (c1900-1952), who studied (and later taught) at the Royal Manchester College of Music with Walter Hatton and Arnold Trowell. Fogg dedicated his 1922 Poem for cello and piano to her, and they married in 1926. She was a frequent performer and broadcaster of chamber music, with (among others) her husband, Frank Merrick and Maurice Jacobson. In the mid-1930s their address was 12, Marlborough House, Osnaburgh Street, Regent's Park.

Eric Fogg died on 19 December 1939, when he either fell or jumped under the wheels of a train at Waterloo Station in London. He had been on his way to Brighton for his second wedding. The coroner delivered an open verdict, however his death is often described as suicide.

== Music ==
Fogg's music attracted differing opinions and even some hostility during his lifetime. Some critics felt that he was too modernistic, but others complained that he did not wholeheartedly encompass modernism. It soon fell from the repertoire, but of recent years his music has started to be performed once more, and recorded.

- Sea Sheen: An Idyll, Op. 17 (1920) was written before his study with Granville Bantock. It is possible that it is the same as the Idyll heard at Bournemouth on 24 March 1919. It exists in both piano and orchestral versions, the latter recorded by the BBC Midland Light Orchestra conducted by Gilbert Vinter, and more recently by the BBC Concert Orchestra under Gavin Sutherland.
- The tone poem Merok (1929), in the form of variations on a Norwegian folk song, refers to a village in Western Norway at the head of the Geiranger Fjord. It was recorded for the first time by the BBC Concert Orchestra under Vernon Handley. A new recording by the BBC Philharmonic Orchestra, conducted by Rumon Gamba, was issued by Chandos Records in September 2019. Gamba describes the work as showing "restrained beauty and a certain melancholy by using shifting, unexpected harmonies and constantly altering the placement of the melody within the orchestra – most hauntingly at the end where the bass clarinet disappears into the misty fjord..."
- The original score for the choral and orchestral work The Seasons (words by William Blake) was either lost or destroyed. It was premiered at the Leeds Festival in 1931, in the same concert as the premiere of William Walton's Belshazzar's Feast, where it was inevitably overshadowed. To celebrate the centenary of Fogg's birth, a new score was prepared, and the work was performed by the Broadheath Singers and the Windsor Sinfonia conducted by Garry Humphreys at St Mary's Parish Church, Slough, on 13 September 2003. It received another performance on 25 March 2006, with the BBC Philharmonic and the Leeds Festival Chorus under Simon Wright, which was (apparently erroneously) described as "the first performance in 75 years". A non-commercial recording exists.
- The Bassoon Concerto in D (1931), written for Archie Camden and premiered by him with the BBC Symphony Orchestra, conducted by the composer on 20 August 1931 at the Queen's Hall was recorded by Graham Salvage with the Royal Ballet Sinfonia conducted by Gavin Sutherland in 2001. It is the most substantial orchestral score of his to have survived.

Other works include:

- Fantasy for cello and piano (1918)
- Hansel and Gretel, ballet (1918)
- Scenes from Grimm, orchestra (1918)
- Dance Fantasy for piano and strings (1919), which won a Cobbett Prize
- The Golden Valley, Chinese suite (1919)
- The Golden Butterfly, ballet suite, op 40 (June 1919)
- Three Chinese Songs, op 59 (1920; words by Leigh Henry)
- The Hillside (1921; soprano, baritone, chorus and orchestra; words by Rabindranath Tagore)
- Songs of Love and Life (Tagore; 1921)
- Overture to Shakespeare's The Comedy of Errors (1922)
- String Quartet in A-flat (1922–23)
- Poem for cello and piano (1922)
- Faery Pieces suite for piano
- Sonata in A for violin and piano (1923?)
- Ode to a Nightingale (Keats) for baritone, string quartet, harp (1924)
- Introduction and Allegro for flute, oboe, clarinet, horn and piano (fp 1927)
- Fantasy Overture: September Night (1934), orchestra
- Ballade in C♯ minor (piano)
- Caprice for violin
- Fanfare for 4 trumpets
- The Little Folk, song cycle
- Prelude for orchestra: Past the Sweet Lilac Clover-field
- Quintet for flute, oboe, clarinet, bassoon and piano
- Romance for oboe and piano
- Suite for violin, cello and harp
- Three Traditional North Country Songs
- Two Blake Songs
- Two Pieces for clarinet and piano
- many piano pieces.
- various other songs

Fogg orchestrated Walter Carroll's Seascape: A Children's Suite. The piece has been recorded by the Northern Chamber Orchestra under Nicholas Ward.
