= Alfred Wolmark =

Polish artist

Alfred Aaron Wolmark RA
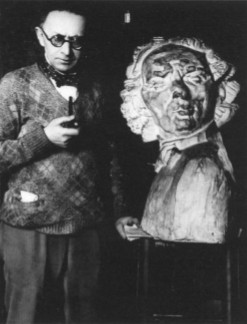
- Wolmark with Henri Gaudier-Brzeska's 'Bust of Wolmark', circa 1913
- Born: Aaron Wolmark; 28 December 1877 (Note: The 2004 Ben Uri catalogue suggests doubt regarding his date of birth, possibly in 1876.); Warsaw, Poland
- Died: 6 January 1961 (aged 83); London, United Kingdom
- Spouse: Bessie Leah Tapper (m. 1911)
- Children: 2 sons, 1 daughter

Alfred Aaron (Note: The Times obituary gives "Aaran".) Wolmark (28 December 1877 – 6 January 1961) was a painter and decorative artist. He was a Post Impressionist and a pioneer of the New Movement in Art.

He was born Aaron Wolmark into a Jewish family in Warsaw, who were amongst the many subsequently fleeing the pogroms of Eastern Europe. The family moved to Devon when he was six before moving to Spitalfields, East London, there along with many other Jewish immigrant émigré families. He became a British citizen in 1894.

== Education ==
He studied briefly at the Royal Academy Schools and exhibited there from 1901 to 1936. (1895–98 1st Silver Medallist for Drawing). There he took the forename Alfred, by which he is known.

== Career ==
Returning briefly to Poland in 1903, he painted works based his Jewish identity and faith, refraining from depicting the persecution and anti-Semitism his family witnessed on the continent and idealising the peaceful and contemplative elements of his religion. His first one-man exhibition was held at the Bruton Galleries in 1905.

In July 1911, after an artistic epiphany on honeymoon in Concarneau, Brittany, he became influenced by modern French painting, his colour palette and style became post impressionist, and Wolmark jettisoned his early methods in favour of the pioneering 'colourist' path that he followed for the next two decades of his working life. He was one of the British fauves and pitched his tonal divisions to a higher key than any of his contemporaries.

Wolmark kept to traditional genre, and transformed his subjects through the use of flattened forms, built up with a heavy impasto. His daring use of bright colour on some paintings such as "An Arrangement: Group of Nudes" demonstrate a skillset akin to Andy Warhol and earned him the title of 'The Colour King'.

His use of colour was so bright that in an exhibition of the International Society of Artists no English painter dared hang work next to his. His work was finally placed next to Van Gogh's, a matter of considerable pride to the artist in later years. In 1910, works by Wolmark were included in Roger Fry's seminal exhibition "Manet and the Post Impressionists" at the Grafton Gallery.

Wolmark's paintings, like those of Van Gogh, are characterized by a bold application of paint and heavy impasto. These characteristics were criticised by the artist and writer Walter Sickert, who wrote: "Mr. Wollmark (sic) presents a curious problem. Beginning with quite reasonable pictures he has of late years put on a turgid and bombastic method of impasto which entirely defeats the painter's intention. Thick oil- paint is the most undecorative matter in the world ... You cannot see Mr. Wollmark's (sic) pictures for the paint."

In later years Wolmark met the sculptor Henri Gaudier-Brzeska and the two became close friends. Gaudier-Brzeska warmed to Wolmark's impassioned New Art and modelled a bronze bust of the young artist in 1913 and ended up celebrating the artists individuality in a face that strongly resembled Beethoven at the time.

On 13 March 2024 a new auction record for the artist, we had Lot 84, Dreweatts sale of a portrait of Gaudier Brzeska at Work by British artist Alfred Wolmark, which sold for £175,200. Dated 1912, this work was originally in the private collection of Mrs May Platini, the artist's niece. It depicts French artist and sculptor, Henri Gaudier Brzeska working on the portrait bust of his close friend Alfred Wolmark, which was posthumously cast in an edition of six between 1954-60.

Wolmark visited New York in 1919, soon after the end of the First World War, and his paintings of the city were exhibited at the Kervorkian Gallery there in 1919–20. While Wolmark enjoyed a modest degree of success before the Second World War, and continued to exhibit occasionally in London after it, his reputation fell into decline long before his death in 1961 and was only revived in the 1970s by a new scholarly and critical appreciation of his work. A retrospective of his work was held at Ferens Art Gallery, Kingston upon Hull in 1975.

A gifted portraitist, whose sitters included Thomas Hardy, Aldous Huxley and G. K. Chesterton, Wolmark was also active as a graphic designer, producing book illustrations and posters, as well as undertaking work on costume and stage designs for two Diaghilev ballets in 1911, a set of abstract designs for the stained glass windows of St Mary's Parish Church, Slough in 1915 and a selection of decorative pottery for an exhibition the following year.

His paintings are now in many galleries around the world, including the National Portrait Gallery, London, Sheffield, Derby Museum and Art Gallery, and Fischer Hall (University of Notre Dame), London.

The Tate Gallery Archives under reference GB 70 TGA 721 hold two complete boxes donated by Wolmarks family which contain a number of letters, papers, artworks, photographs and press cuttings, including his original diary that identifies the purchasers of some of his paintings.

== Bibliography ==
- Ben Uri Gallery and Museum, Rediscovering Wolmark, 2004, ISBN 978-0900157332
