= List of people from Slough =

This is a list of notable people who are current or former residents or associates of the town of Slough in Berkshire.

- Tim Bennett, bass player with The Stone Age Band
- Cecil Aldin (1870–1935), painter of animals and rural life
- Gerry Anderson (1929–2012), television drama maker and creator of supermarionation
- Stanley Baldwin (1867–1947), schoolboy at St Michael's School, Aldin House and later Prime Minister
- Steve Bell (born 1951), political cartoonist
- Cliff Bennett (born 1940), of Cliff Bennett and the Rebel Rousers
- Keith Bosley (born 1937), poet and translator
- Alan Bown (1942–2014), of The Alan Bown Set
- Fenner Brockway (1888–1988), anti-war activist and politician
- Mark Brzezicki (born 1957), drummer with Big Country, Procol Harum
- Jimmy Carr (born 1972), comedian
- Alma Cogan (1932–1966), singer, former pupil at St Joseph's School
- Kenton Cool (born 1973), climber and mountain guide
- Graham Cooley (born 1964), entrepreneur and investor
- Rod Evans (born 1947), original lead singer of Deep Purple
- Sean Foley (born 1964), comedian
- Thomas Gray (1716–1771), poet, classical scholar, and professor of history
- Geri Halliwell (born 1972), entertainer
- Chip Hawkes, of The Tremeloes
- Caroline Herschel (1750–1848), astronomer.
- John Herschel (1792–1871), mathematician and astronomer.
- William Herschel (1738–1822), astronomer and composer.
- Alan Johnson (born 1950), former Slough postal worker and Cabinet minister
- Simon Kernick (born 1967), author
- Danny King (born 1969), author
- Jayne Kitt (born 1970), Big Brother 7 contestant
- Iain Lee (born 1973), entertainer
- Spencer Livermore, Baron Livermore (born 1975), politician
- Keith Mansfield (born 1940), composer and arranger
- Forrest Mars Sr. (1904–1999), entrepreneur
- Marian McPartland (1918–2013), jazz pianist
- John Nash (1893–1977), painter
- Gary Numan (born 1958), musician
- Richard of Cornwall (1209–1272), royal aristocrat, Plantagenet.
- Helen Sharman (born 1963), scientist and astronaut
- Kalim Siddiqui (1931–1996), journalist and Muslim activist
- Billy Smart, Jr (1934–2005), circus owner
- Una Stubbs (1937–2021), actress.
- Ellen Ternan (1839–1914), actress
- Thousand Yard Stare (formed 1989), indie pop band
- Tracey Ullman (born 1959), comedian and first appearance for the Simpsons
- Robert Watson-Watt (1892–1973), scientist
- Justin Sullivan Singer/Guitarist New Model Army. Born in nearby Jordans, Buckinghamshire

== Sport ==
- Adam Azim (born 2002), professional boxer
- Armando Broja (born 2001), professional footballer
- Alan Paris (born 1964), footballer
- Matty Cash (born 1997), footballer
- Billy Clifford (born 1992), footballer
- Kim Conley (born 1986), Olympic athlete
- Tommy Farr (1913–1986), boxer
- Sam Hutchinson (born 1989), footballer
- Mark Hylton (born 1976), Olympic athlete
- Fiona May (born 1969), twice world long jump champion
- Mark McGuinness (born 2001), footballer
- Grace Moloney (born 1993), Ireland international footballer
- Jordi Osei-Tutu (born 1998), footballer
- Lloyd Owusu (born 1976), Ghana international footballer
- Marcia Richardson (born 1972), Olympic athlete
- Mark Richardson (born 1972), Olympic athlete
- David Rocastle (1967-2001), footballer
- Marcus Willis (born 1990), tennis player
- Vic Woodley (1910–1978), footballer
