= Heart of Slough =

Urban redevelopment scheme in Slough, England

Coordinates: 51°30′38.35″N 0°35′41.96″W

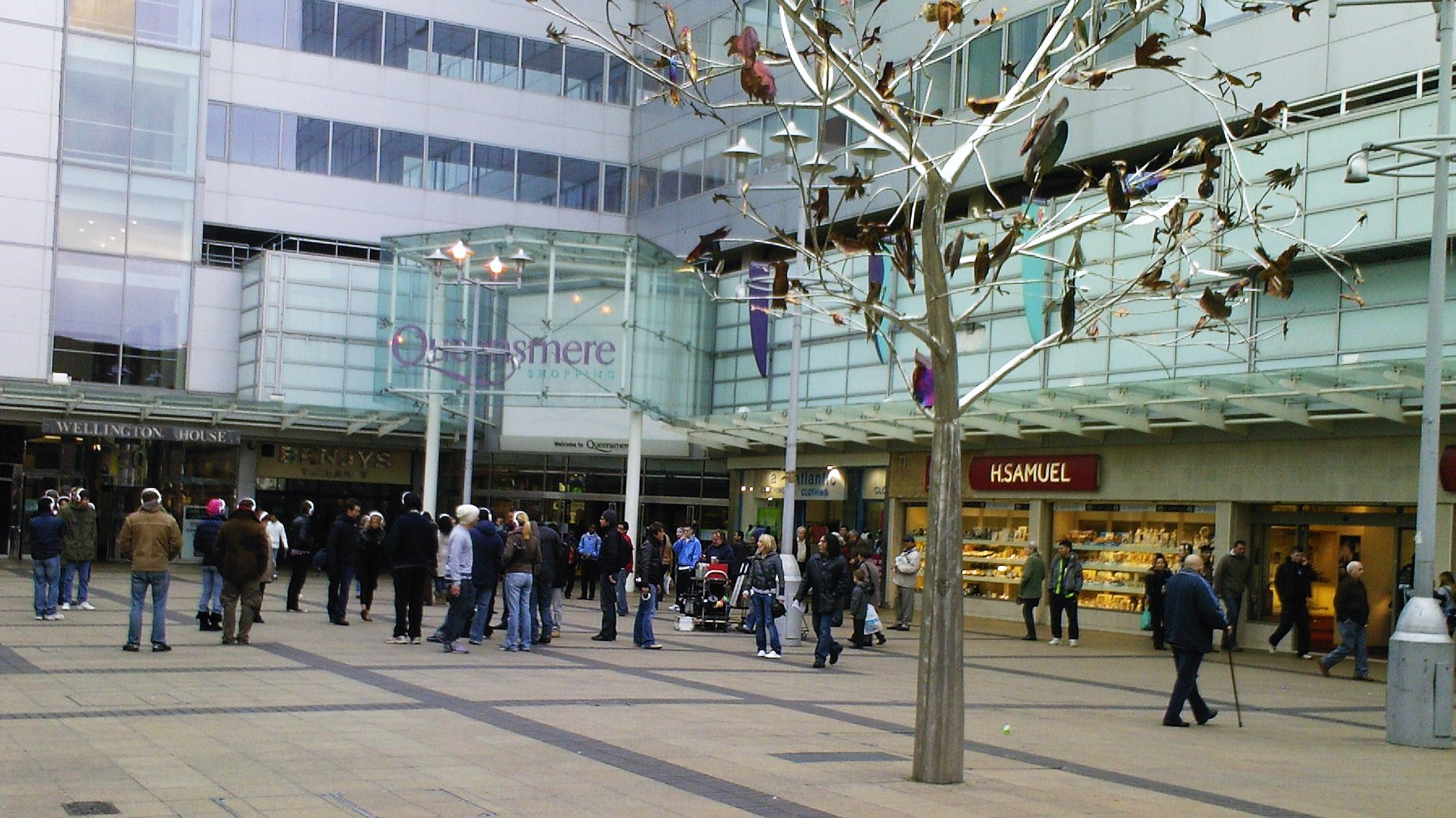
The redevelopment of the shopping centre in Slough, part of the Heart of Slough redevelopment programme

The Heart of Slough project is a £400 million plan to redevelop the town centre in Slough, Berkshire. Begun in 2009, it aims to create a "cultural quarter" for the creative media, information and communications industries in the town.

== Timeline ==
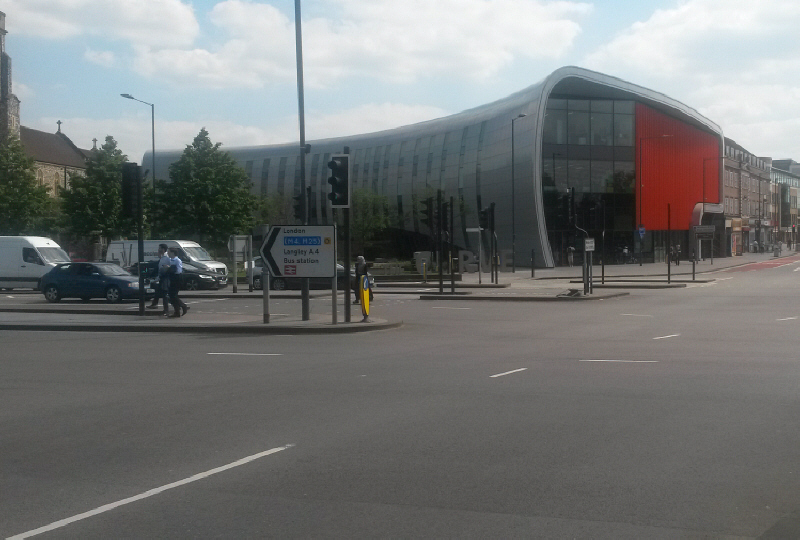
The Curve, Slough's new Library and Cultural Centre, opened in 2016

- Slough Borough Council awarded planning permission for the scheme in July 2009.
- In December 2009, the Homes and Communities Agency signed an agreement to provide £11 million in funding for the scheme while Thames Valley University courses which were due to remain in the town were relocated to The Centre in Farnham Road, Slough.
- A total modernisation of the town's bus station began in March 2010. Half of the existing building was demolished, as was Compair House near the railway station. The new bus station opened in May 2011, five months behind schedule.
- Redevelopment of the railway station started in the early weeks of August 2011 and was scheduled to finish before the 2012 London Olympics. Meanwhile, the remainder of the old bus station was demolished.
- A new £1 billion learning centre called The Curve was expected to start construction in early 2012 but was delayed until February 2014. It was finished in 2015 and opened the following year. It was named 'Best Public Service Building' at the Local Authority Building Control (LABC) excellence awards held in March 2017. It was built by Slough Urban Renewal, a partnership between the council and Morgan Sindall.
- In October 2022, flames from a bus fire spread to the building's canopy, causing significant damage to the building and extensive damage to the roof itself.

== Reception ==
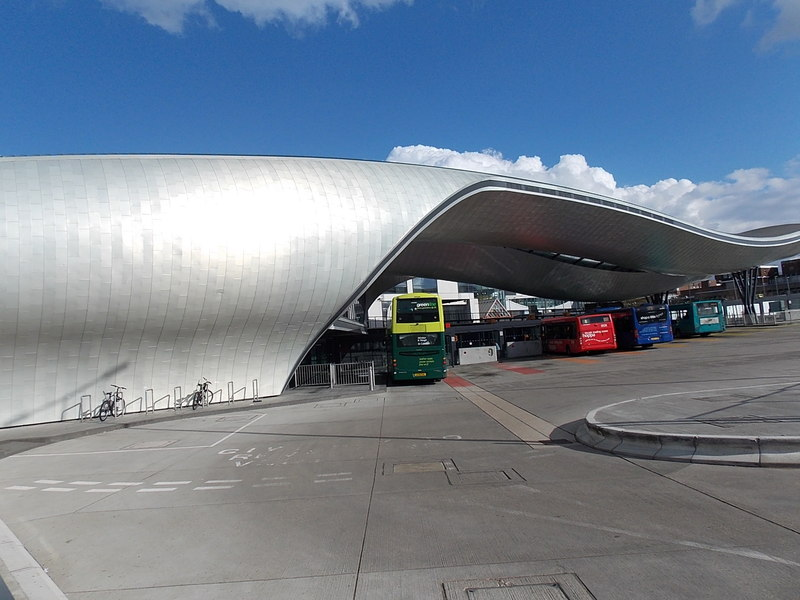
The new Slough Bus and Coach Station in 2013

The town's bus station has been criticised by residents and nicknamed "The Slug". Critics cite the absence of public lavatories, lack of adequate seating areas and lack of warm waiting areas. They say the shape of the building channels rainwater into the main waiting area. Wheelchair access has also been a major issue.
