= Slough =

Town in Berkshire, England

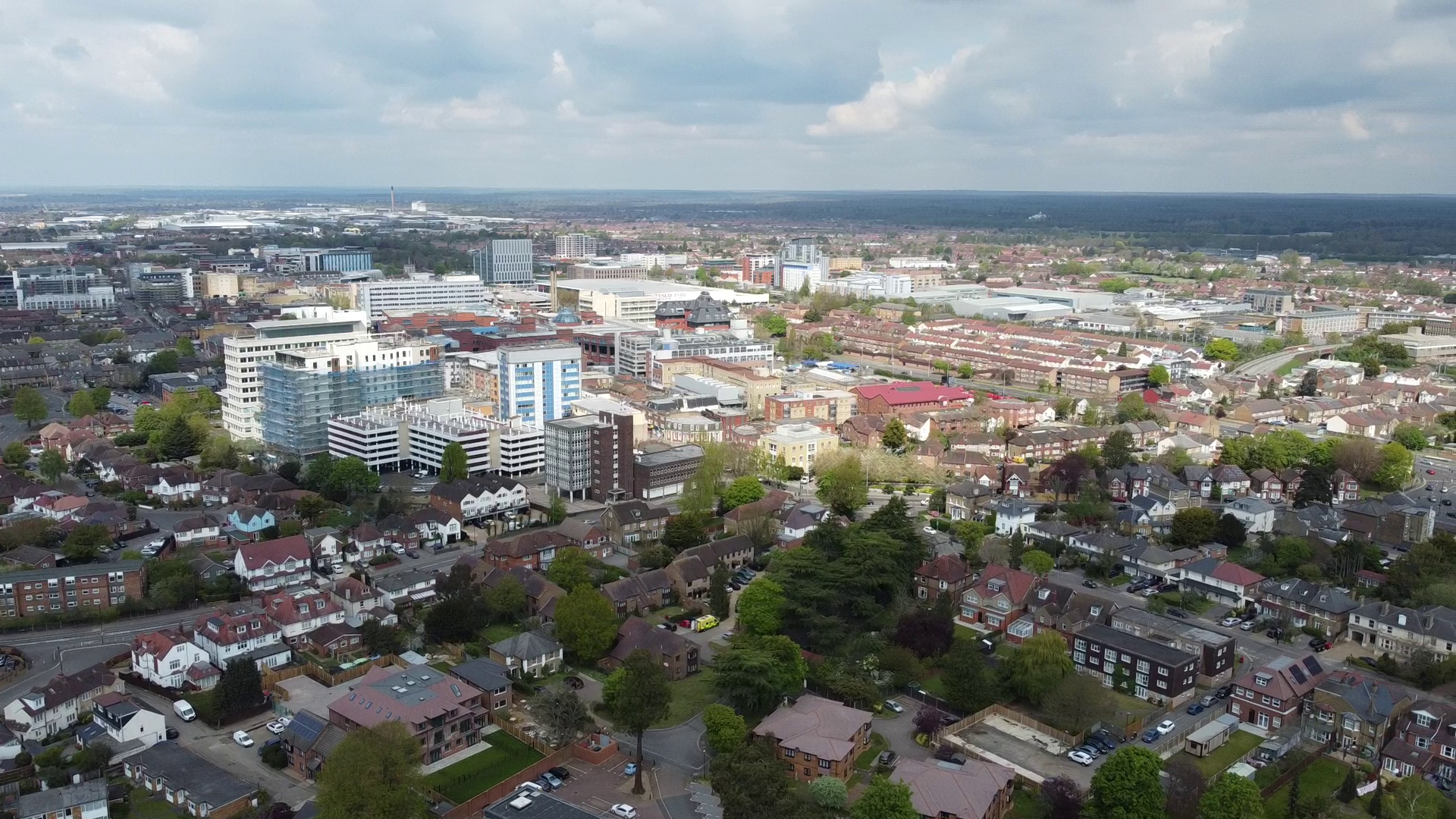
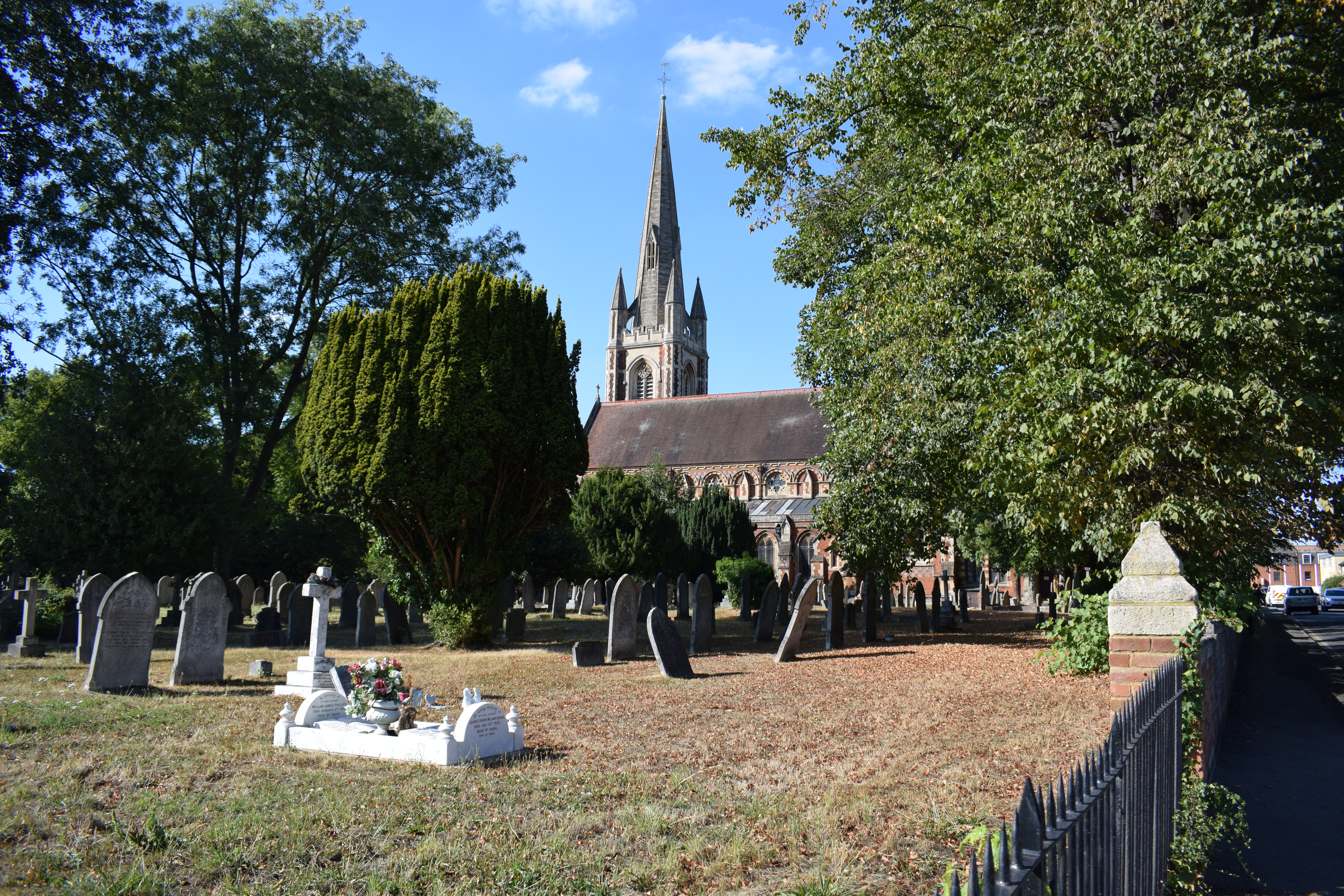
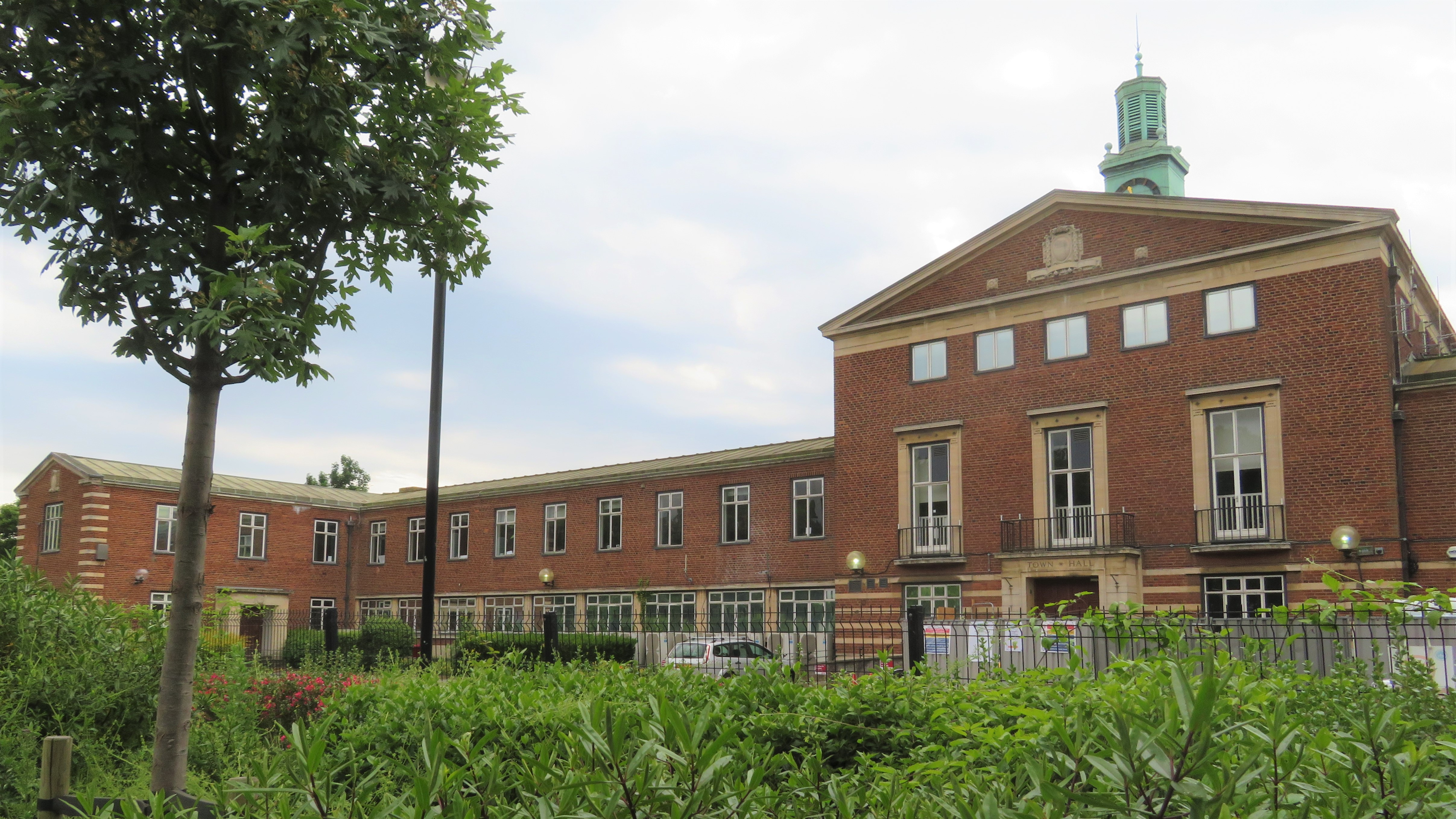
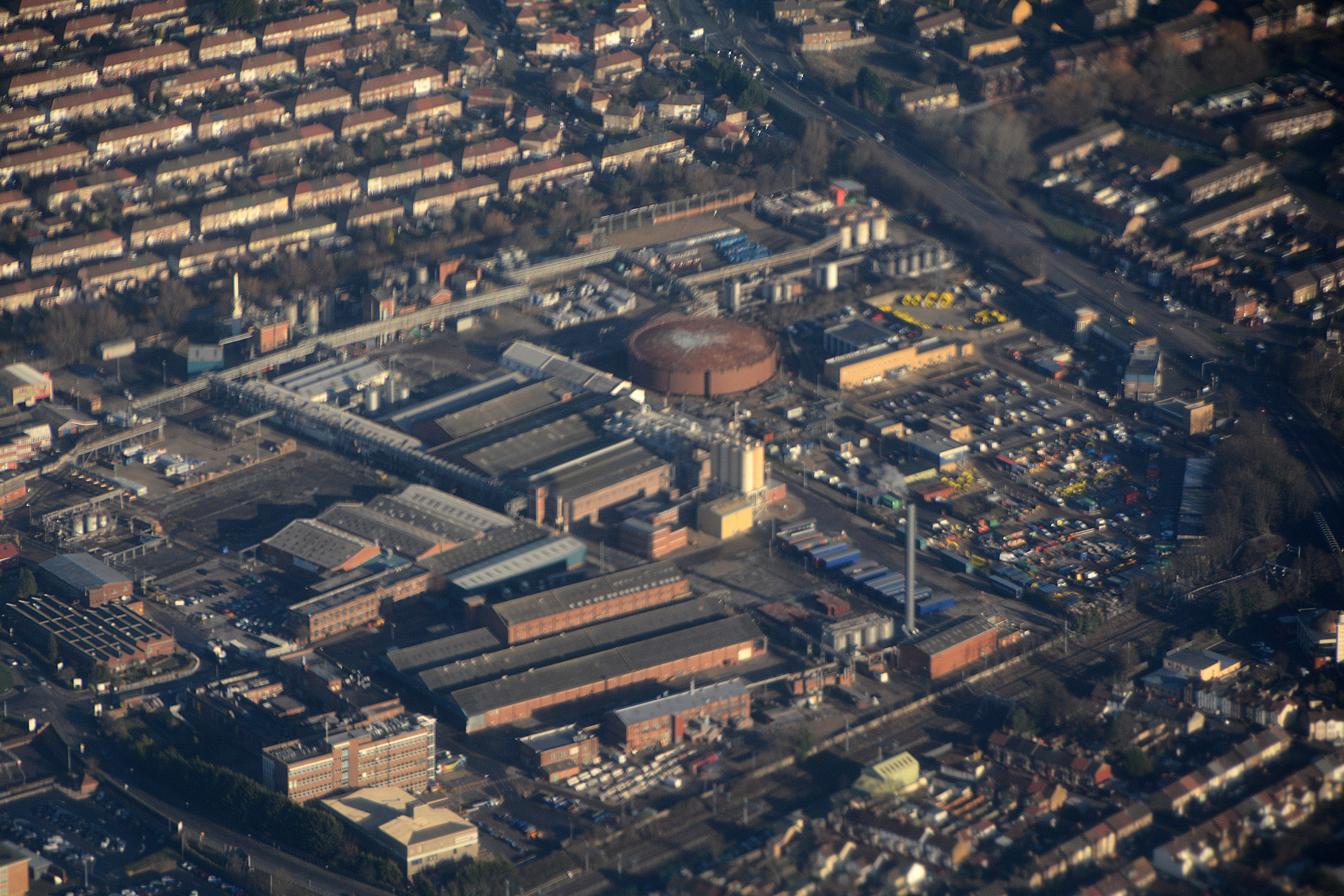
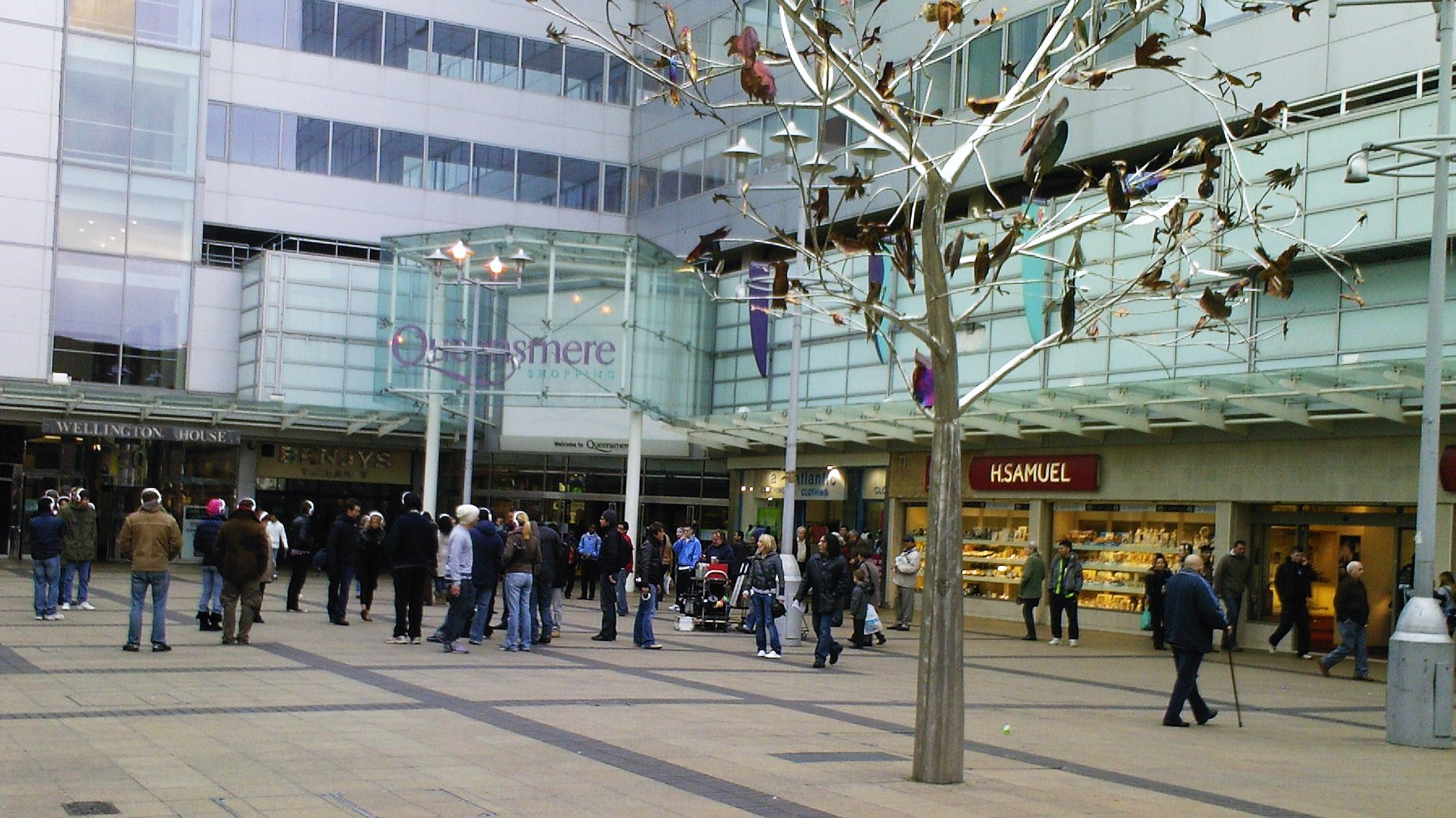
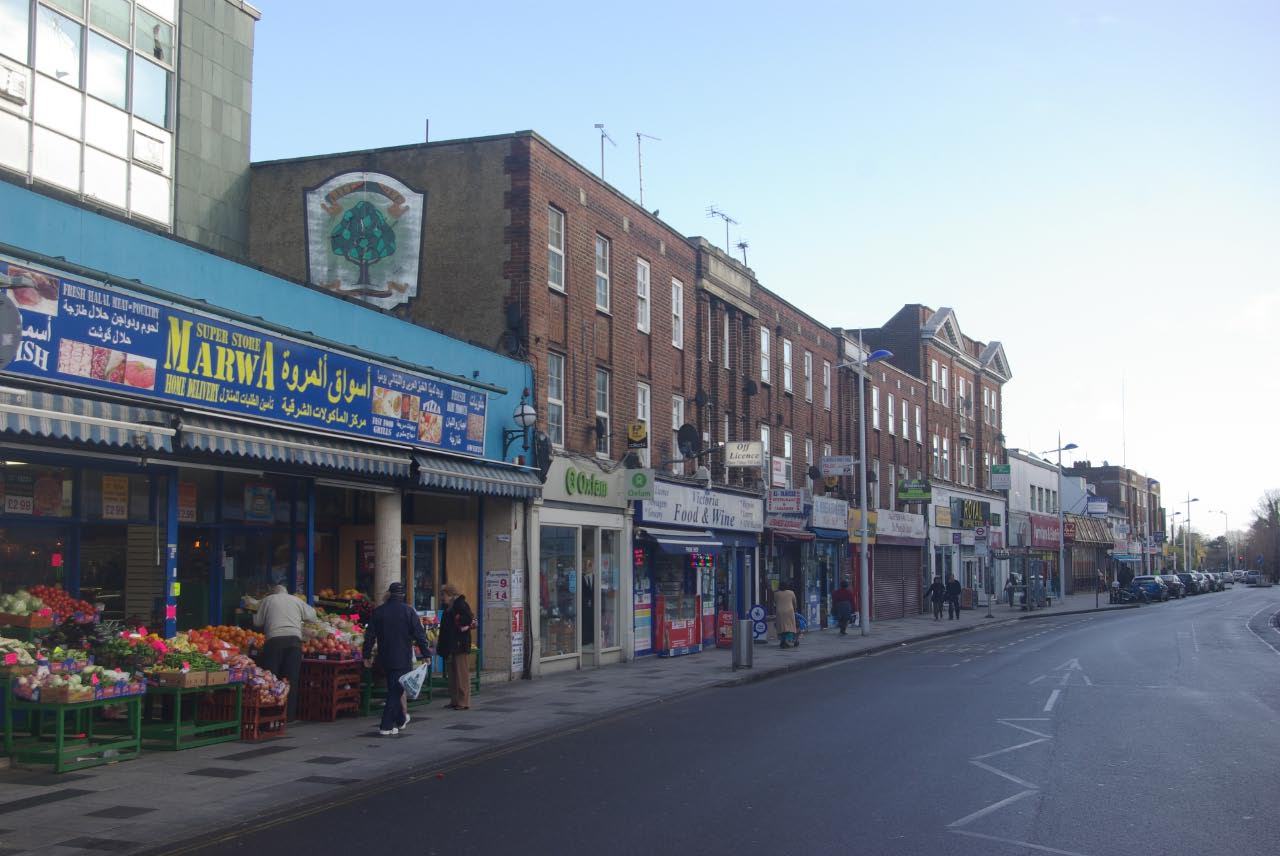
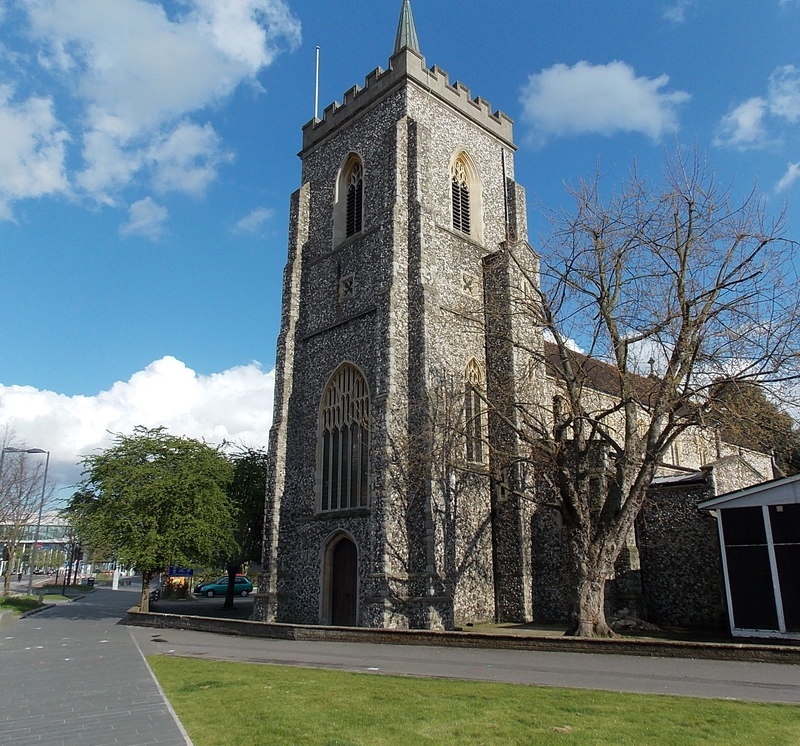
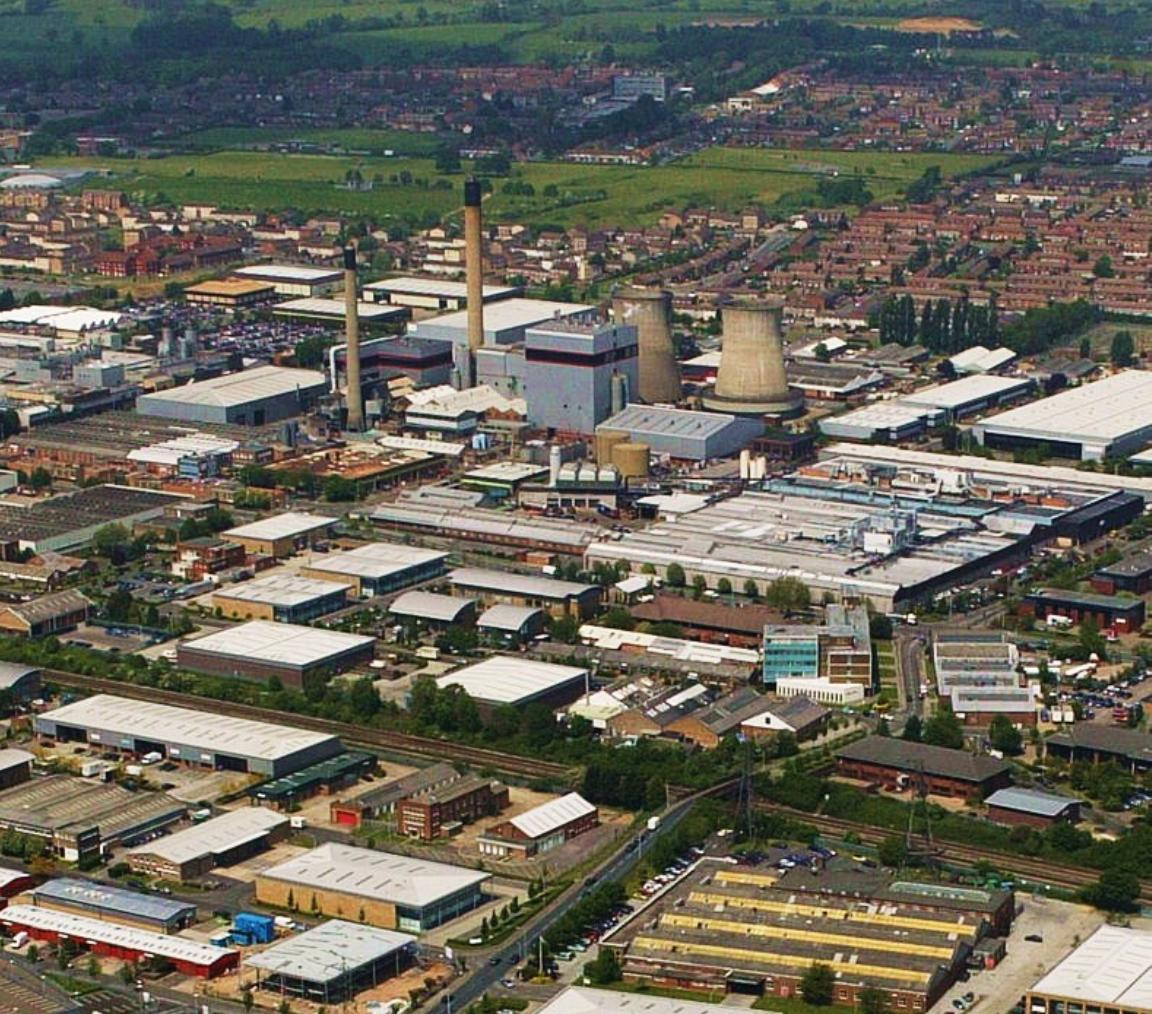
- From top, left to right: Slough skyline, St Mary's Church, Old Town Hall, Gas Works and surrounding area, Queensmere Shopping Centre, High Street, St Ethelbert's Church and Slough Trading Estate.

- Location within Berkshire
- Area: 11.71 sq mi (30.3 km^{2})
- Population: 143,184 (2021 Census)
  - Density: 12,227/sq mi (4,721/km^{2})
- Unitary authority: Slough
- Shire county: Berkshire
- Region: South East
- Country: England
- Sovereign state: United Kingdom
- Post town: SLOUGH
- Postcode district: SL1–SL3
- Dialling code: 01753
- UK Parliament: Slough
- Website: slough.gov.uk

Slough (/slaʊ/) is a town in Berkshire, England, in the Thames Valley, 20 miles (32 km) west of central London and 19 miles (31 km) north-east of Reading, at the intersection of the M4, M40 and M25 motorways. It is part of the historic county of Buckinghamshire. In 2021, the population of the town was 143,184. The wider Borough of Slough had a population of 158,500.

Slough's population is one of the most ethnically diverse in the United Kingdom, attracting people from across the country and the world for labour since the 1920s, which has helped shape it into a major trading centre. In 2021, 46.9% of the population was Asian, 35.9% White, 7.5% Black, 4% Mixed, 1.2% Arab and 4.5% of other ethnic heritage.

Other than London, Slough has the highest concentration of global company headquarters in the UK. Blackberry, McAfee, Burger King, DHL, Telefonica and Lego have head offices in the town. Slough Trading Estate is the largest industrial estate in single private ownership in Europe, with over 17,000 jobs in 400 businesses.

== History ==
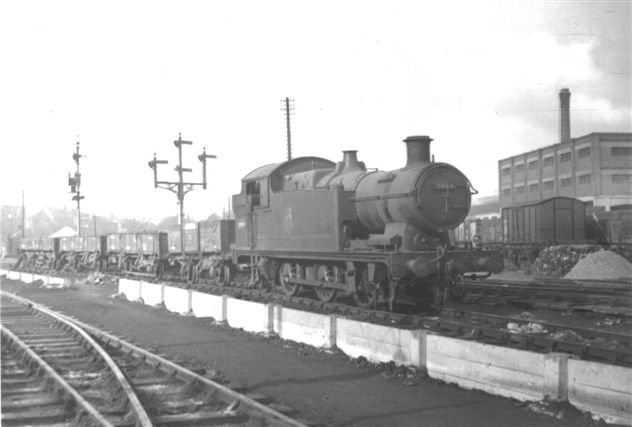
Former GWR locomotive 6664, near the engine shed at Slough, October 1955

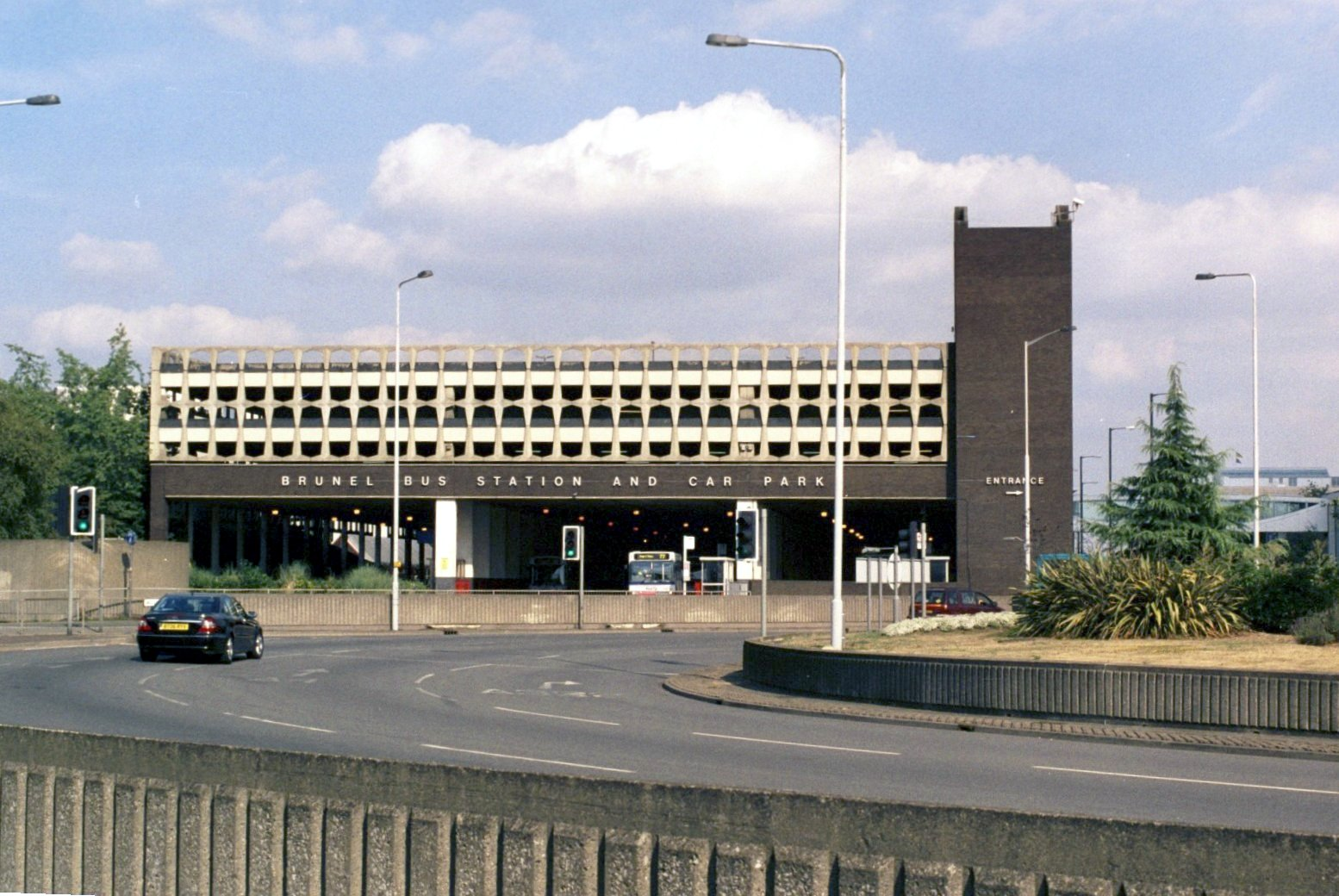
The Brunel bus station and car park, opened in 1975, has now been demolished as work has started on the Heart of Slough project.

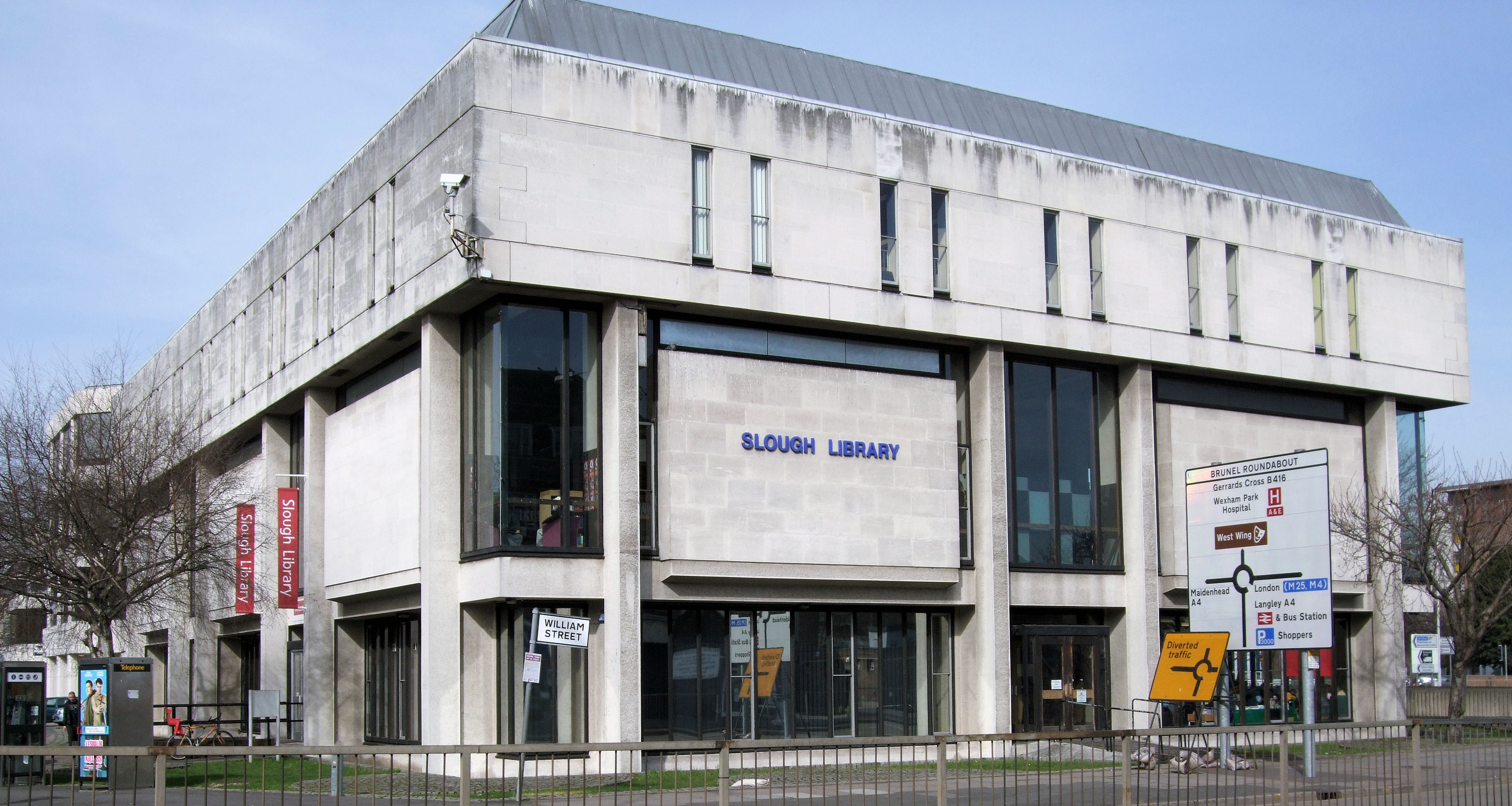
Robert Taylor Library

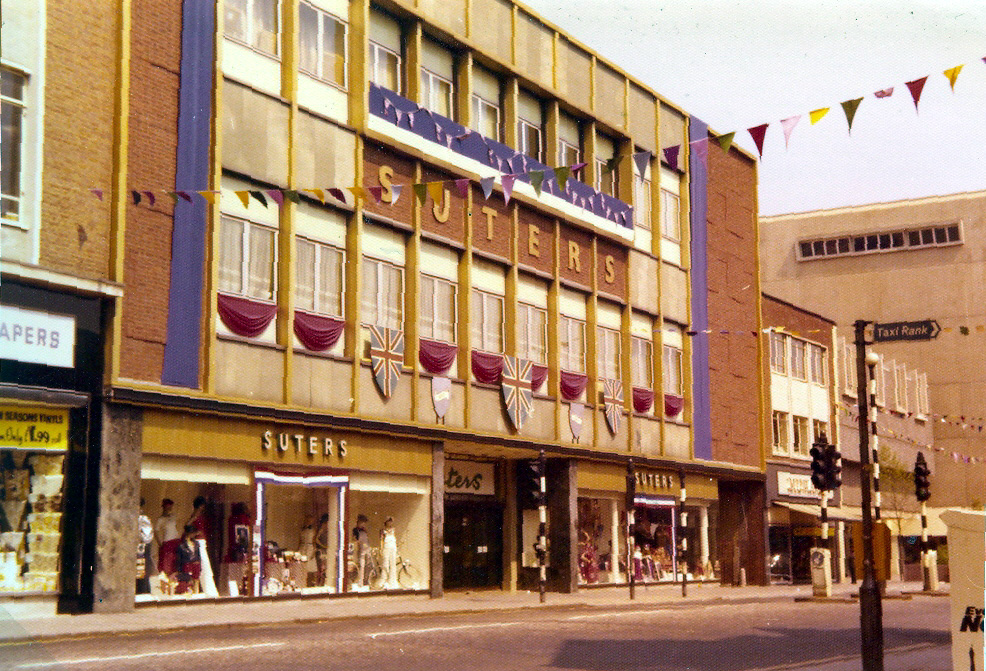
Suters Limited in Slough High Street, 1978

The town's name was first recorded in 1195 as Slo. It first seems to have applied to a hamlet between Upton to the east and Chalvey to the west, roughly around the "Crown Crossroads" where the road to Windsor (now the A332) met the Great West Road. The Domesday Survey of 1086 refers to Upton, and a wood for 200 pigs, worth £15.

During the 13th century, King Henry III had a palace at Cippenham. Parts of Upton Court were built in 1325. St Mary the Virgin Church in Langley was probably built in the late 11th or early 12th century, though it has been rebuilt and enlarged several times.

From the mid-17th century, stagecoaches passed through Slough and Salt Hill, later absorbed into Slough, as locations to change horses on the journey out from London. By 1838 and the opening of the Great Western Railway, Upton-cum-Chalvey's parish population was 1,502. In 1849, a branch line was completed from Slough to Windsor & Eton Central, opposite Windsor Castle, for Queen Victoria's convenience.

Slough has 96 listed buildings, i.e. protected historic structures. There are

- Four Grade I: St Laurence's Church (Upton), St Mary the Virgin Church, Langley, Baylis House and Godolphin Court
- Seven Grade II*: St Mary's Church (Upton-cum-Chalvey), Upton Court, the Kederminster and Seymour Almshouses in Langley, St Peter's Church (Chalvey), Ostrich Inn (Colnbrook) and King John's Palace (Colnbrook)
- Grade II listed structures include four milestones, Beech, Oak and Linden Houses at Upton Hospital, St Ethelbert's Church, Slough and Slough railway station.

In 1918, a large area of agricultural land to the west of Slough developed as an army motor repair depot, to store and repair huge numbers of motor vehicles coming back from the battlefields of the First World War in Flanders. In April 1920, the Government sold the site and its contents to the Slough Trading Co. Ltd. Repair of ex-army vehicles continued until 1925, when the Slough Trading Company Act was passed allowing the company, renamed Slough Estates Ltd, to establish an industrial estate. Spectacular growth and employment ensued, with Slough attracting workers from many parts of the UK and abroad. Slough Town Hall, which was designed by Charles Holloway James and Stephen Rowland Pierce, was completed in 1937.

During the Second World War, Slough experienced a series of air raids, mostly in October 1940. On the 13th, 5 people were killed in an air raid, the deadliest raid on Slough. An emergency hospital treating casualties from London was set up in Slough. Local air raid deaths and deaths at the hospital account for the 23 civilian lives lost in the borough area.

After the war, several further large housing developments arose to take large numbers of people migrating from war-damaged London. Between 1955 and 1957 the town was the site of the Slough experiment, a large-scale road safety trial.

The old Slough library opened in November 1974, named after Alderman Robert Taylor in recognition of his contribution to the library service. The library was officially opened by the Mayor, Councillor DR Peters, in May 1975. It was demolished in May 2017 as part of the programme of redevelopment in the town centre.

=== Redevelopment ===
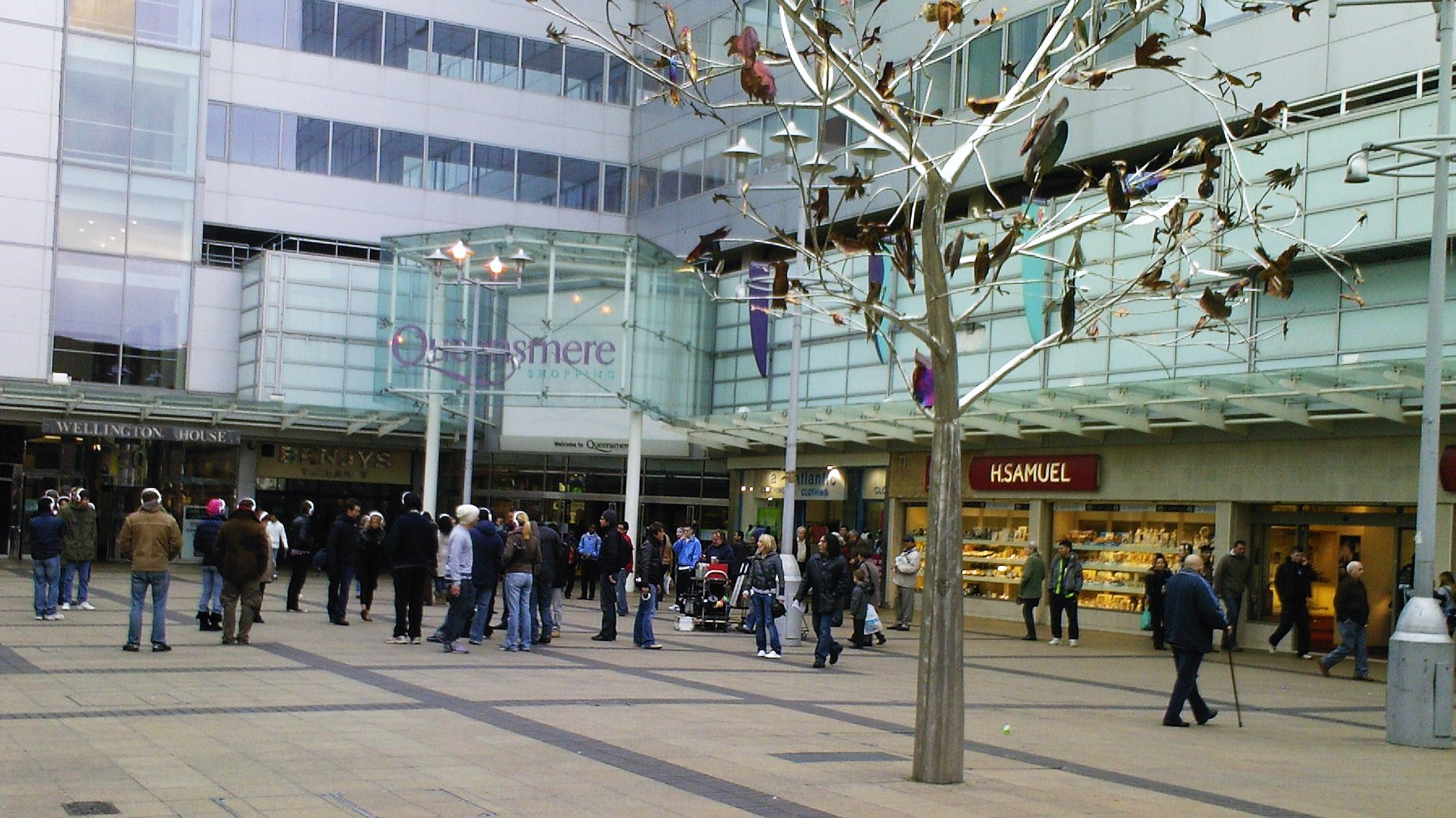
The redevelopment of the shopping centre in Slough as part of the Heart of Slough redevelopment programme

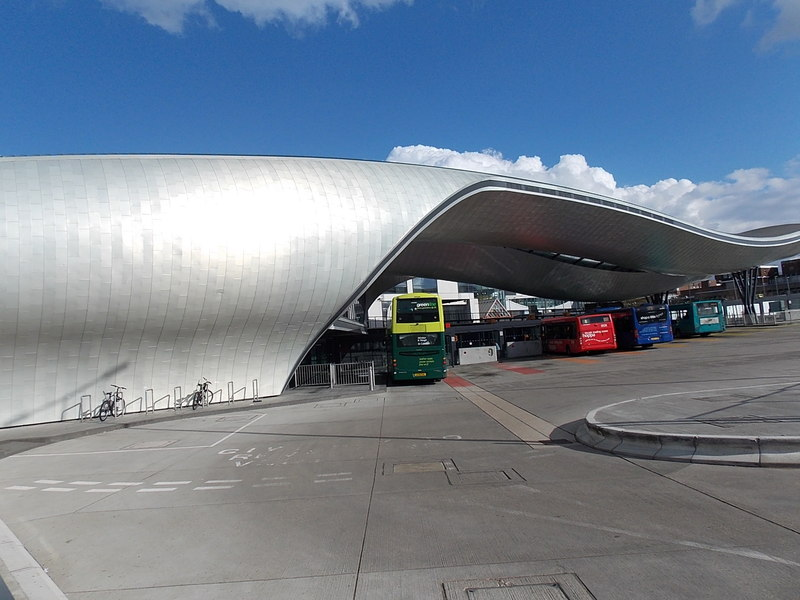
The newly built Slough bus station in April 2013

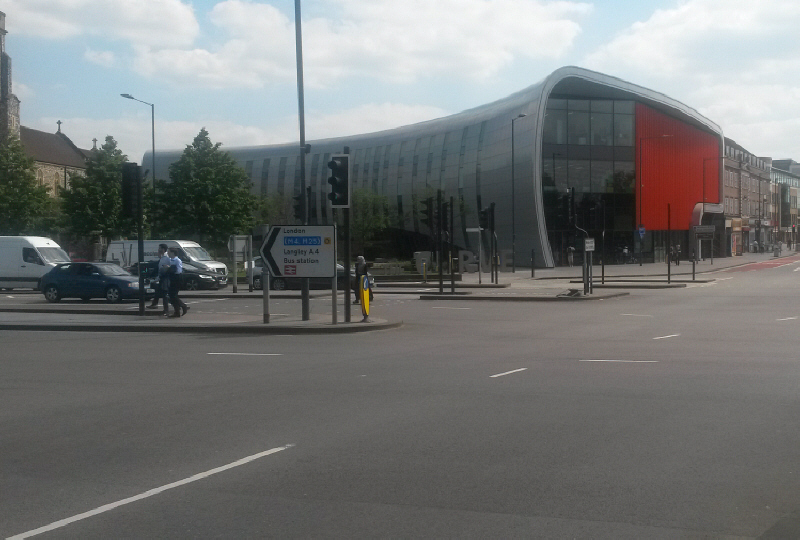
'The Curve', Slough's distinctively shaped Library and Cultural Centre, opened in 2016. It was named 'Best public service building' at the Local Authority Building Control (LABC) excellence awards held in March 2017. It was built by Slough Urban Renewal, a partnership between the council and Morgan Sindall.

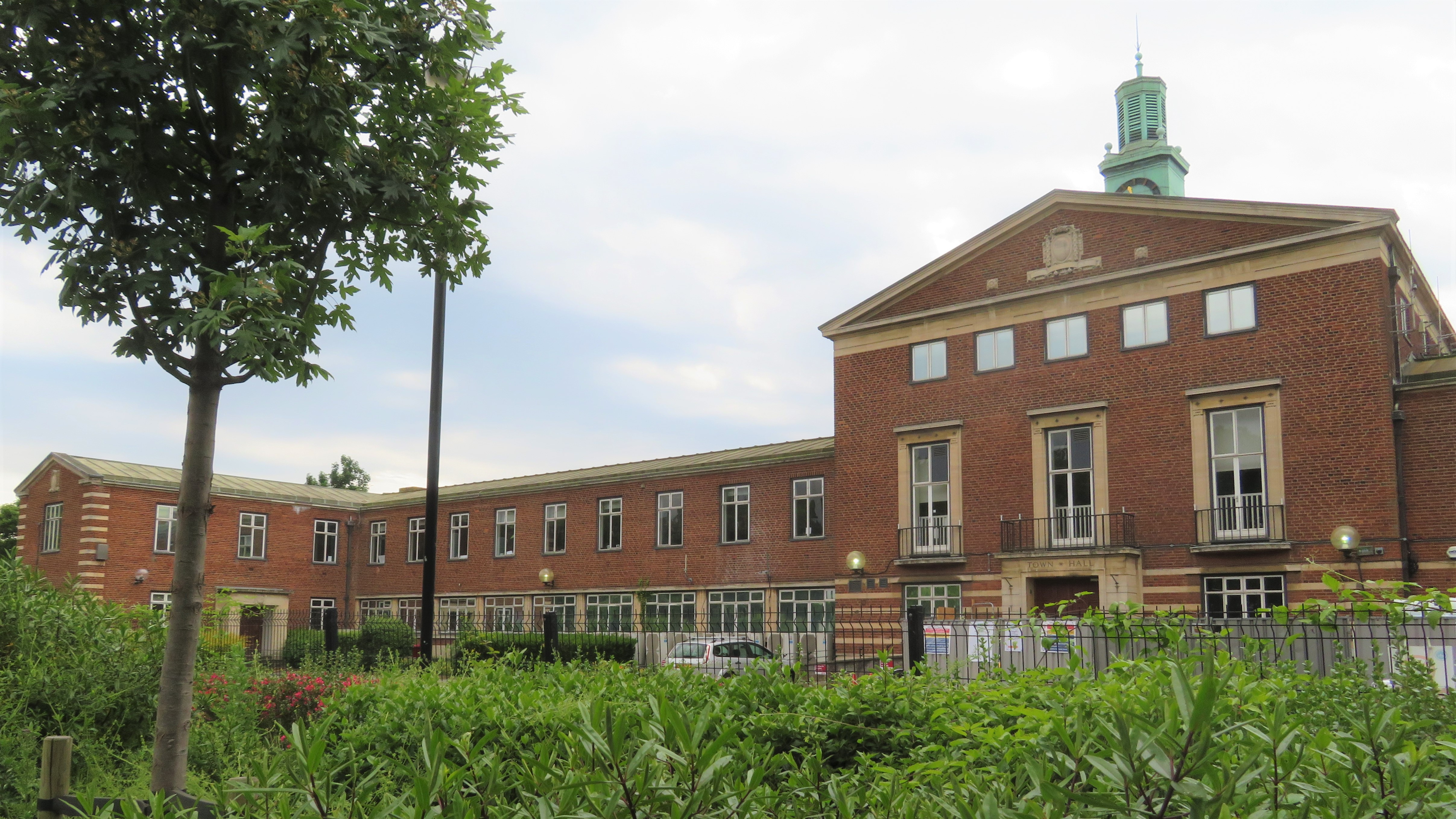
Old Town Hall: Council's headquarters 1937–2011, now a school

In the 21st century, Slough has seen major redevelopment of the town centre. Old buildings are being replaced with new offices and shopping complexes. Tesco has replaced an existing superstore with a larger Tesco Extra. The Heart of Slough Project is plan for the large-scale redevelopment of the town centre as a focus and cultural quarter for the creative media, information and communications industries created a mixed-use complex, multi-functional buildings, visual landmarks and a public space in the Thames Valley. Approval was given for the £400 million project by Slough Borough Council's planning committee in July 2009, and work began in 2010 for completion in 2018.

In December 2009, two key components of the project were signed: the Homes and Communities Agency (HCA) signed its agreement to provide £11m of funding for infrastructure and Thames Valley University (TVU) courses which were due to remain in the town found a new home at the Centre in Farnham Road, Slough. In parallel to the town centre redevelopment plan, Segro, owner of the Slough Trading Estate, planned to spend £600 million over the following 20 years on the estate. This was intended to create environmentally sustainable buildings, open green spaces, two hotels, a conference centre, cafés, restaurants and better transport facilities to improve links to Slough town centre and the surrounding residential areas. It was claimed that the plan would create more than 4,100 new jobs and contribute around £100m a year to Slough's economy. If both plans went ahead, nearly £1 billion would be spent on redeveloping Slough over the next 20 years.

In 2009, Herschel Park, known as Upton Park until 1949, named for astronomer William Herschel, was relandscaped in a multimillion-pound effort to bring it back to its former Victorian era glory. The park was featured in an episode of the documentary programme Who Do You Think You Are? focusing on the TV presenter Davina McCall.

In 2010, £2 million was set aside to improve disabled access to Slough railway station in preparation for an expected increase in use during the 2012 London Olympics. Preparations were under way for the regeneration of the Britwell suburb of Slough, involving tearing down a dilapidated block of flats and the closing of the public house the Jolly Londoner in Wentworth Avenue and replacing them with new homes, as well as relocating the shopping parade in the street to nearby Kennedy Park.

As part of the Heart of Slough project, construction work on a new bus station began in March 2010, following weeks of demolition work to half of the existing bus station and the removal of Compair House near the railway station. It was opened in May 2011.

Redevelopment on this scale has been strongly criticised by conservation groups. The Twentieth Century Society has stated that

[A] tragically high quantity of good buildings have been demolished in Slough in recent years, including grand Art-Deco-styled factories by the likes of Wallis Gilbert and high-quality post-war offices. More are to come down as the town tries to erase its past and reinvent itself from scratch. Despite famously heckling Slough, John Betjeman's praise for the town hall's architecture as 'a striving for unity out of chaos' in 1948 has never been so relevant as today. C20 believes that the redevelopment of the town hall would be an act of vandalism to the civic centre and is supporting the Campaign to Save Slough's Heritage in their request for a review of the decision.

During November 2016, the Slough Queensmere and Observatory shopping centres were sold to Abu Dhabi Investment Authority (ADIA) in a deal worth £130 million.

In February 2025, it was reported that the council was considering a number of options to merge with larger local authorities, including joining a London borough or becoming part of the Greater London Authority.

== Geography ==
Slough is 20 miles (32 km) west of Charing Cross, central London, 2 miles (3 km) north of Windsor, 5 miles (8 km) east of Maidenhead, 11 miles (18 km) south-east of High Wycombe and 19 miles (31 km) north-east of the county town of Reading. Slough is within the Greater London Urban Area and on the border with London Borough of Hillingdon and London Borough of Hounslow. Heathrow Airport is 5 miles away. Nearby towns are Uxbridge to the northeast and Beaconsfield to the north.

Most of the area that now makes up Slough was anciently part of Buckinghamshire. Poyle was historically in Middlesex. The town developed by the expansion and amalgamation of villages along the Great West Road. Over the years Slough has expanded greatly, incorporating a number of different villages. Original villages that are now suburbs of Slough include Chalvey, Cippenham, Colnbrook, Langley, Poyle, Upton, and Wexham.

Named neighbourhoods include Brands Hill, Britwell, Huntercombe, Manor Park, Salt Hill, Upton Lea and Windsor Meadows. The urban area merges into the neighbouring parishes of Burnham, a small area of Taplow near Cippenham, Farnham Royal and Stoke Poges which remain in the county of Buckinghamshire and Datchet which is in Berkshire. Eton is narrowly buffered by the Jubilee River and by green space (mainly the college playing fields) from part of Slough, and the two areas formerly formed the Eton birth, marriages and deaths registration district.

=== Climate ===
The nearest Met Office weather observing station to Slough is Heathrow Airport, about 5 miles (8 km) east of Slough town centre. This part of the Thames Valley is notable for generally having the warmest daytime summer temperatures on average in the British Isles. Typically, according to 1981–2010 normals, the average high temperature in July is 23.5 °C (74.3 °F.)

Rainfall is low compared to most of the British Isles, with under 600 mm (23.62 in) annually, and 105 days reporting over 1 mm of rain.

Climate data for Heathrow Airport WMO ID: 03772; coordinates 51°28′45″N 0°27′02″W; elevation: 25 m (82 ft); 1991–2020 normals, extremes 1948–present
Month	Jan	Feb	Mar	Apr	May	Jun	Jul	Aug	Sep	Oct	Nov	Dec	Year
Record high °C (°F)	16.0 (60.8)	20.1 (68.2)	23.8 (74.8)	28.5 (83.3)	35.1 (95.2)	36.4 (97.5)	40.2 (104.4)	37.9 (100.2)	33.0 (91.4)	28.8 (83.8)	18.6 (65.5)	16.6 (61.9)	40.2 (104.4)
Mean daily maximum °C (°F)	8.4 (47.1)	9.0 (48.2)	11.7 (53.1)	15.0 (59.0)	18.4 (65.1)	21.6 (70.9)	23.9 (75.0)	23.4 (74.1)	20.2 (68.4)	15.8 (60.4)	11.5 (52.7)	8.8 (47.8)	15.7 (60.3)
Daily mean °C (°F)	5.6 (42.1)	5.8 (42.4)	7.9 (46.2)	10.5 (50.9)	13.7 (56.7)	16.8 (62.2)	19.0 (66.2)	18.7 (65.7)	15.9 (60.6)	12.3 (54.1)	8.4 (47.1)	5.9 (42.6)	11.7 (53.1)
Mean daily minimum °C (°F)	2.7 (36.9)	2.7 (36.9)	4.1 (39.4)	6.0 (42.8)	9.1 (48.4)	12.0 (53.6)	14.2 (57.6)	14.1 (57.4)	11.6 (52.9)	8.8 (47.8)	5.3 (41.5)	3.1 (37.6)	7.8 (46.0)
Record low °C (°F)	−24 (−11)	−13.6 (7.5)	−8.1 (17.4)	−6.6 (20.1)	−0.9 (30.4)	1.5 (34.7)	5.6 (42.1)	5.9 (42.6)	1.8 (35.2)	−3.3 (26.1)	−7.0 (19.4)	−17.8 (0.0)	−24 (−11)
Average precipitation mm (inches)	58.8 (2.31)	45.0 (1.77)	38.8 (1.53)	42.3 (1.67)	45.9 (1.81)	47.3 (1.86)	45.8 (1.80)	52.8 (2.08)	49.6 (1.95)	65.1 (2.56)	66.6 (2.62)	57.1 (2.25)	615.0 (24.21)
Average precipitation days (≥ 1.0 mm)	11.5	9.5	8.5	8.8	8.0	8.3	7.9	8.4	7.9	10.8	11.2	10.8	111.7
Mean monthly sunshine hours	61.1	78.8	124.5	176.7	207.5	208.4	217.8	202.1	157.1	115.2	70.7	55.0	1,674.8
Source 1: Met Office
Source 2: KNMI

== Demography ==
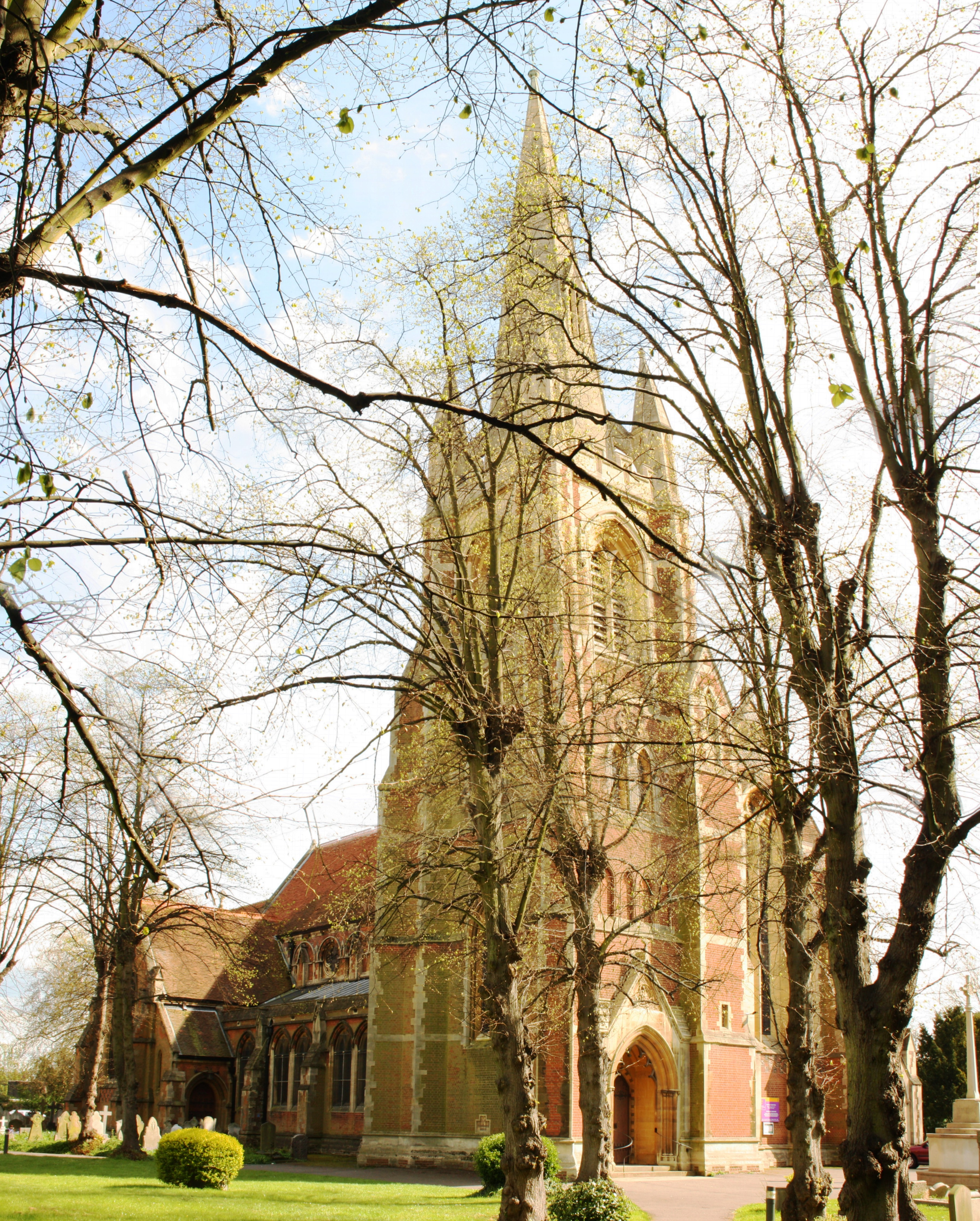
Built in 1876, St Mary's Church is a red brick gothic style Church of England parish church.

Faith in Slough (2021)
1. Christianity (32.0%)
2. No Religion (13.1%)
3. Islam (29.4%)
4. Sikhism (11.3%)
5. Hinduism (7.79%)
6. Buddhism (0.49%)
7. Judaism (0.05%)
8. Other Religions (0.45%)
9. Religion not Stated (5.39%)

According to the 2021 census, Slough is a large town with a population of 158,400 of which 46.9% of the population was Asian, 35.9% White, 7.5% Black, 4% Mixed, 1.2% Arab and 4.5% of other ethnic heritage. This makes the town one of the most ethnically diverse local authorities in the country outside of London.

Despite its diverse population, English is the most spoken language in 2021, with over 110,212 citing English as their first language. Those stating other languages is significantly lower due to the large shares of the British Asian and Black population speaking English as their first language. Aside from English, the most commonly spoken languages are Punjabi, Polish, and Urdu.

Top countries of birth (2021 census)
Country of birth	Number resident
United Kingdom	87,350
India	17,107
Pakistan	14,418
Poland	8,912
Romania	3,551
Kenya	1,940
Sri Lanka	1,385
Somalia	1,336
Italy	1,125
Philippines	1,064

Figures from the 2021 UK census showed that 32% of Slough's population identified as Christian, 29.4% as Muslim, 11.4% as Sikh, 7.8% as Hindu, 0.5% as Buddhist, 0.1% as Jewish, 0.5% as having other religions, 13% as having no religion and 5.4% did not answer the question.

Compared with the 2011 UK census, the percentage of Slough residents identifying as Muslim increased by 6.1%, the largest increase of any religious group in Slough, while those identifying as Christian fell from 41.2% to 32.0%, with those identifying as having no religion rising slightly from 12.1% to 13.1%.

== Governance ==
There is one main tier of local government covering Slough, at unitary authority level: Slough Borough Council, which is based at Observatory House in the town centre. Most of the urban area is unparished, although some of the suburbs are included in civil parishes, including Britwell and Wexham Court.

=== Administrative history ===
Slough was historically a hamlet in the parish of Upton, also known as Upton-cum-Chalvey, in Buckinghamshire. Until 1863 it was administered by the parish vestry and manorial courts, in the same way as most rural areas. As Slough began developing into a town, the need for more urban forms of local government grew. In 1863 a local government district was established for Slough, covering part of the parish of Upton-cum-Chalvey (including the old village of Upton) and a smaller part of the neighbouring parish of Stoke Poges. The town was then governed by an elected local board.

Such local government districts were converted into urban districts under the Local Government Act 1894. In 1900 the Slough urban district was enlarged to absorb most of the residual parts of the old Upton-cum-Chalvey parish that had been outside the urban district, including Chalvey. The urban district was further enlarged in 1930, when it was significantly expanded to take in most of the neighbouring parish of Langley (including the village), the Salt Hill area from the parish of Farnham Royal, and the Cippenham area from the parish of Burnham. In 1938 the urban district was incorporated to become a municipal borough.

In 1974, the Municipal Borough of Slough was replaced by a larger non-metropolitan district with borough status called Slough. The enlarged district gained the Britwell and Wexham Court areas, and was transferred from Buckinghamshire to Berkshire. The borough was enlarged in 1995 to take in Colnbrook with Poyle.

In 1998 Slough Borough Council became a unitary authority when Berkshire County Council was abolished and the borough council took on the former county council's functions in the borough.

Since 2015, Slough has had a Youth Parliament to represent the views of younger people.

=== Town twinning ===
Slough is twinned with:

- Montreuil, France (since 1988)

== Economy ==
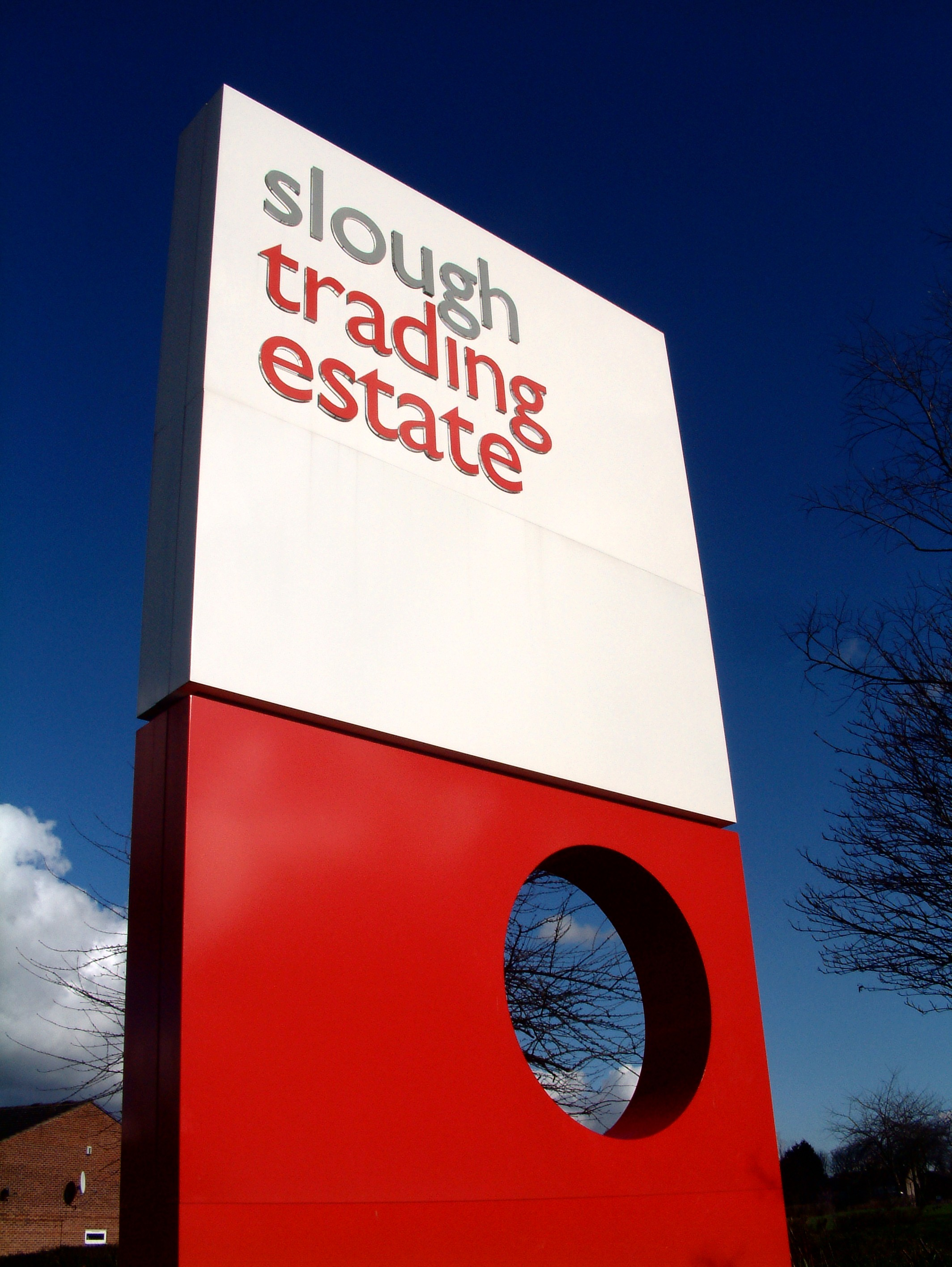
Slough Trading Estate played a major part in making Slough an important business centre in South East England.

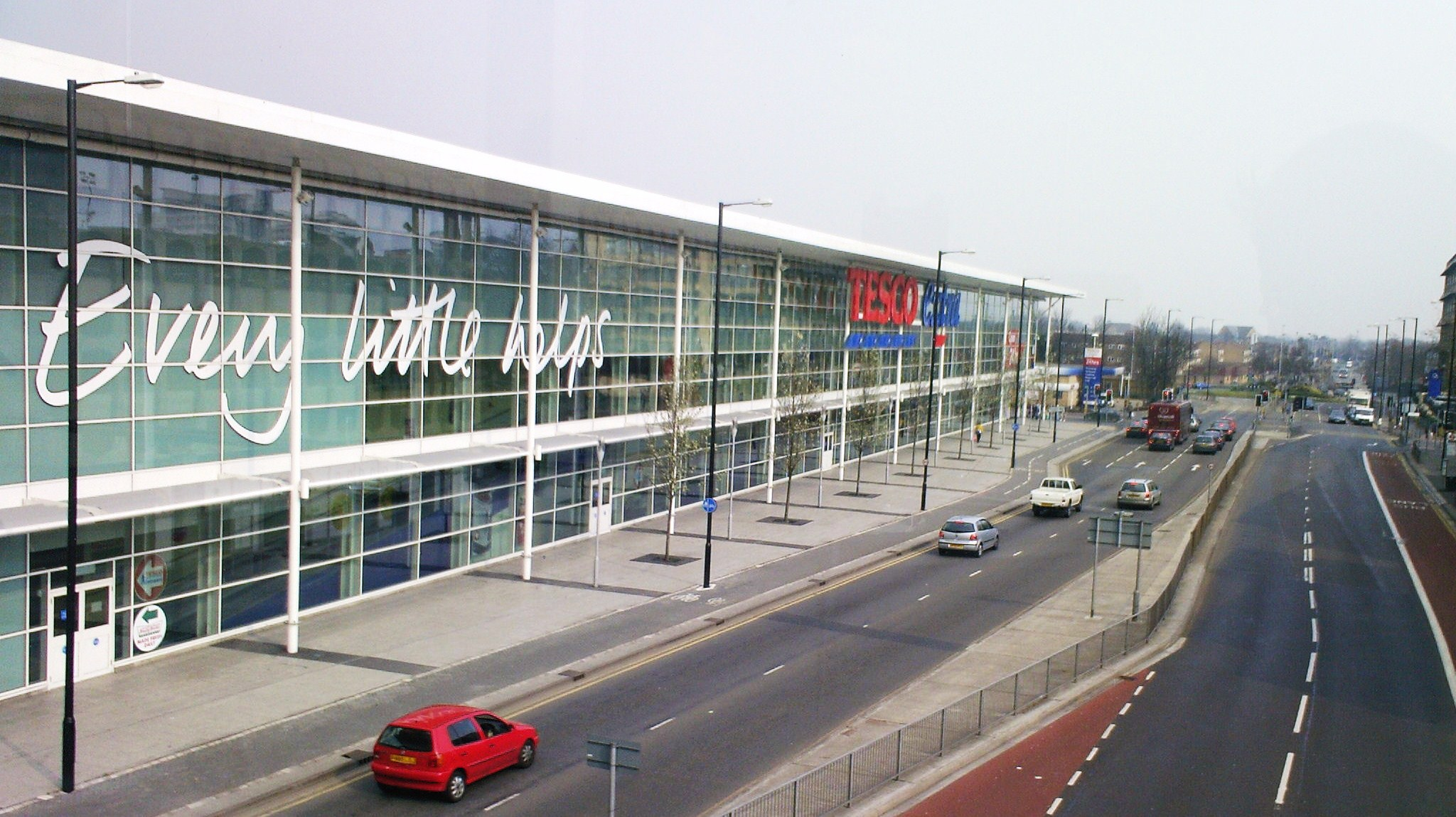
The Tesco Extra store, one of the largest in Europe

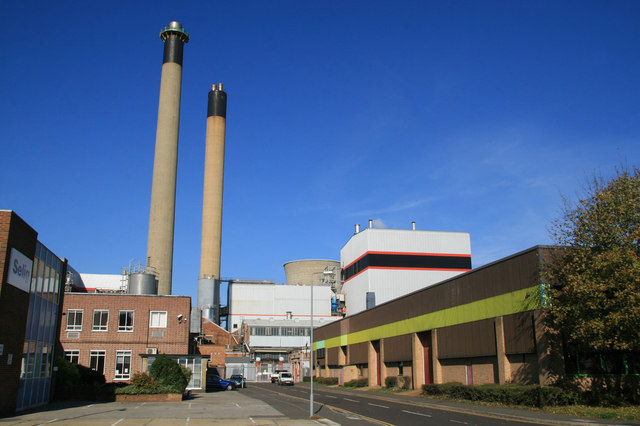
The private power station for Slough Trading Estate. This has been supplying heat and power to the estate since 1920. In 2007 it was taken over by energy supplier Scottish and Southern Energy.

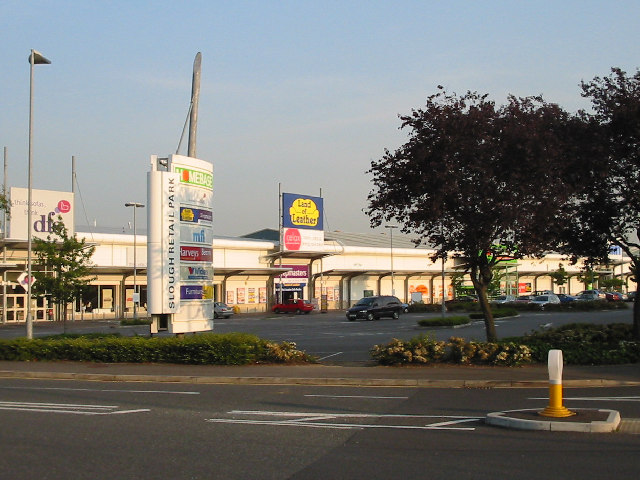
Slough Retail Park, one of many large outlets in the town

Before the 19th century, the main businesses of Slough were brickfields and agriculture. The bricks for the building of Eton College were made in Slough. Later, as the Great West Road traffic increased, inns and pubs sprang up along the road to service the passing trade. Until the town developed as an industrial area, nurseries were prominent in the local economy; the Cox's Orange Pippin apple was first raised in Colnbrook (not then within Slough) around 1825, and the dianthus "Mrs Sinkins Pink" was first raised at some point between 1868 and 1883 by John Sinkins, the master of the Eton Union Workhouse, which lay in Slough.

In the mid-19th century, the only major employer apart from the brickfields was James Elliman, who started as a draper in Chandos Street. In 1847, he changed business and manufactured his Elliman's Embrocation and Royal Embrocation horse liniment at factories in Wellington Street and Chandos Street. Elliman became a major benefactor to the town, and is remembered today in the names of local roads and schools.

In September 1851, William Thomas Buckland, an auctioneer and surveyor from nearby Wraysbury, began livestock sales in a field near the Great Western Road Railway Station belonging to the North Star Inn. Originally held on the first Tuesday of every month, the Cattle Market's popularity soon saw this increased to every Tuesday. A move to Wexham Street was necessitated by the postwar redevelopment of the town. The Slough Cattle Market was run by Messrs Buckland and Sons until its final closure in 1988.

In 1906, James Horlick, one of the founders of the eponymous malted milk company, opened a purpose-built red-brick factory near Slough Railway Station to manufacture his malted milk product. In 2015, the business was sold by Glaxo Smith Kline and in 2017, manufacturing at the site ceased altogether. The site is currently proposed to become residential making use of the original buildings as much as possible.

Starting in the 1920s, Slough Estates Ltd, the operator of the original Slough Trading Estate, created and operated many more estates in the UK and abroad. The Slough Trading Estate meant that the town was largely insulated from many of the effects of recession. For many years, Slough's economy was mainly manufacturing-based. The company Zwicky Limited, a manufacturer of liquid pumps, filters, compression valves and aircraft refuelling units, runway sweepers were based in Slough.

In the last 20 or so years, there has been a major shift from a manufacturing to an information-based economy, with the closure of many factories (some of which had been in Slough for many decades). The factories are rapidly being replaced by office buildings. Hundreds of major companies have sited in Slough Trading Estate over the years, with its proximity to London Heathrow Airport and good motorway connections being attractive. In the 1960s, Gerry Anderson's film company was based in Slough, and his Supermarionation series, including Thunderbirds, were filmed there.

The UK headquarters of Mars, Incorporated is in Slough, the main factory having been established in 1932 by Forrest Mars Sr. and Frank C. Mars. It produced the Mars Bar in Slough over 70 years ago. One of the Mars factories has been demolished and some production has moved to the Czech Republic. The European head offices of major IT companies such as BlackBerry, McAfee, Computer Associates, PictureTel and Compusys (among others) are all in the town. O_{2} is headquartered in the town across four buildings. The town is also home to the business support organisation Thames Valley Chamber of Commerce Group and National Foundation for Educational Research, which is housed in the Mere.

Recent new offices include those of Nintendo, Black and Decker and Abbey business centres. The registered office of Furniture Village lies in the town.

The motor trade has long been represented in Slough. Until 1966, Citroën assembled cars in a Liverpool Road factory (later used by Mars Confectionery), and it retains its UK headquarters in the town. Ford built D Series and Cargo lorries at its factory in Langley (a former Hawker Aircraft site) from 1936 to the 1950s until the site was redeveloped for housing in the 1990s. Ferrari, Mercedes, Fiat and Maserati now have offices in the town.

== Transport ==
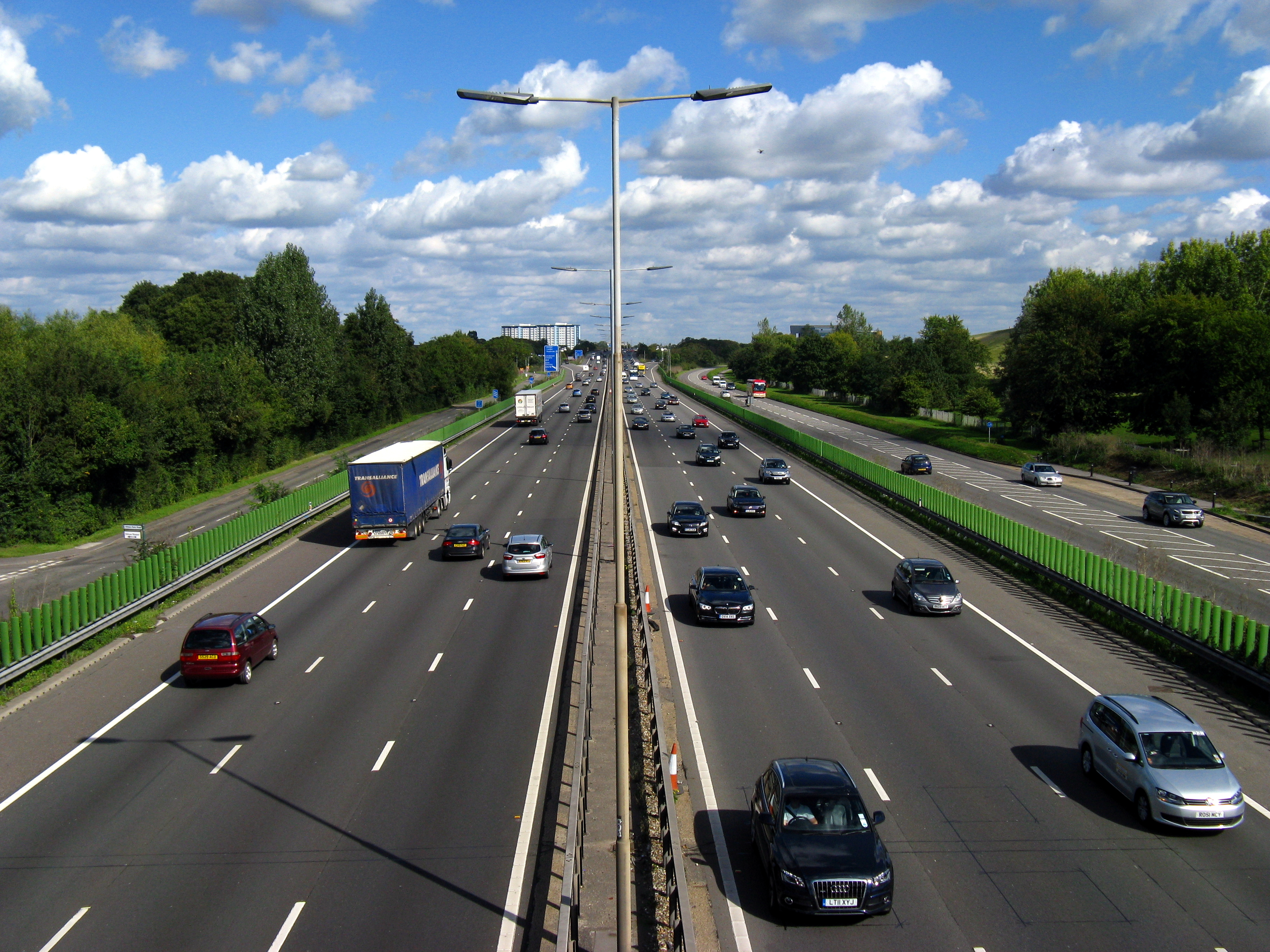
The M4 motorway between Junctions 5 and 6 (facing London)

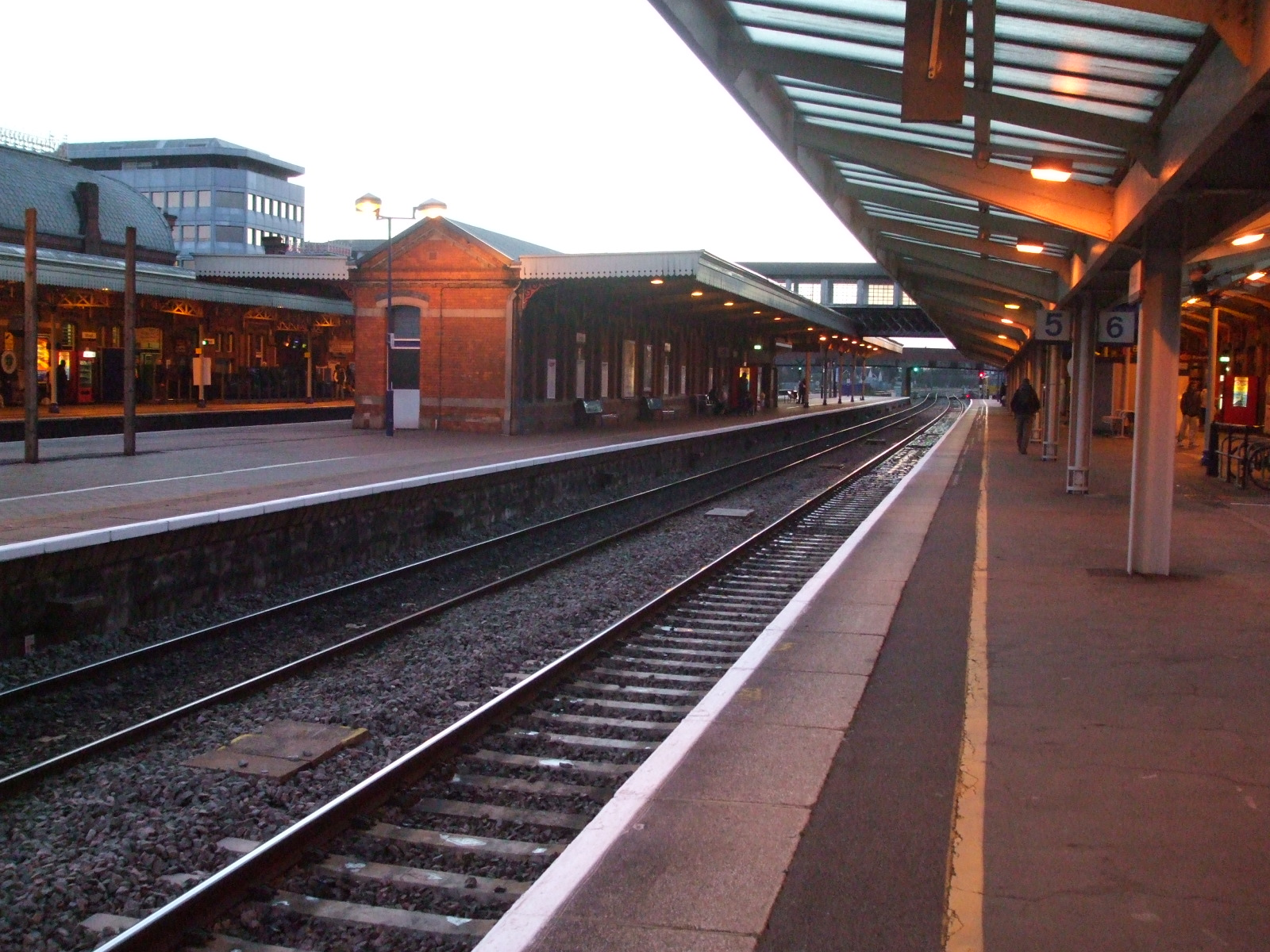
The relief lines at Slough railway station, used for local passenger trains towards Reading (Platform 4, left) and London Paddington (Platform 5, right)

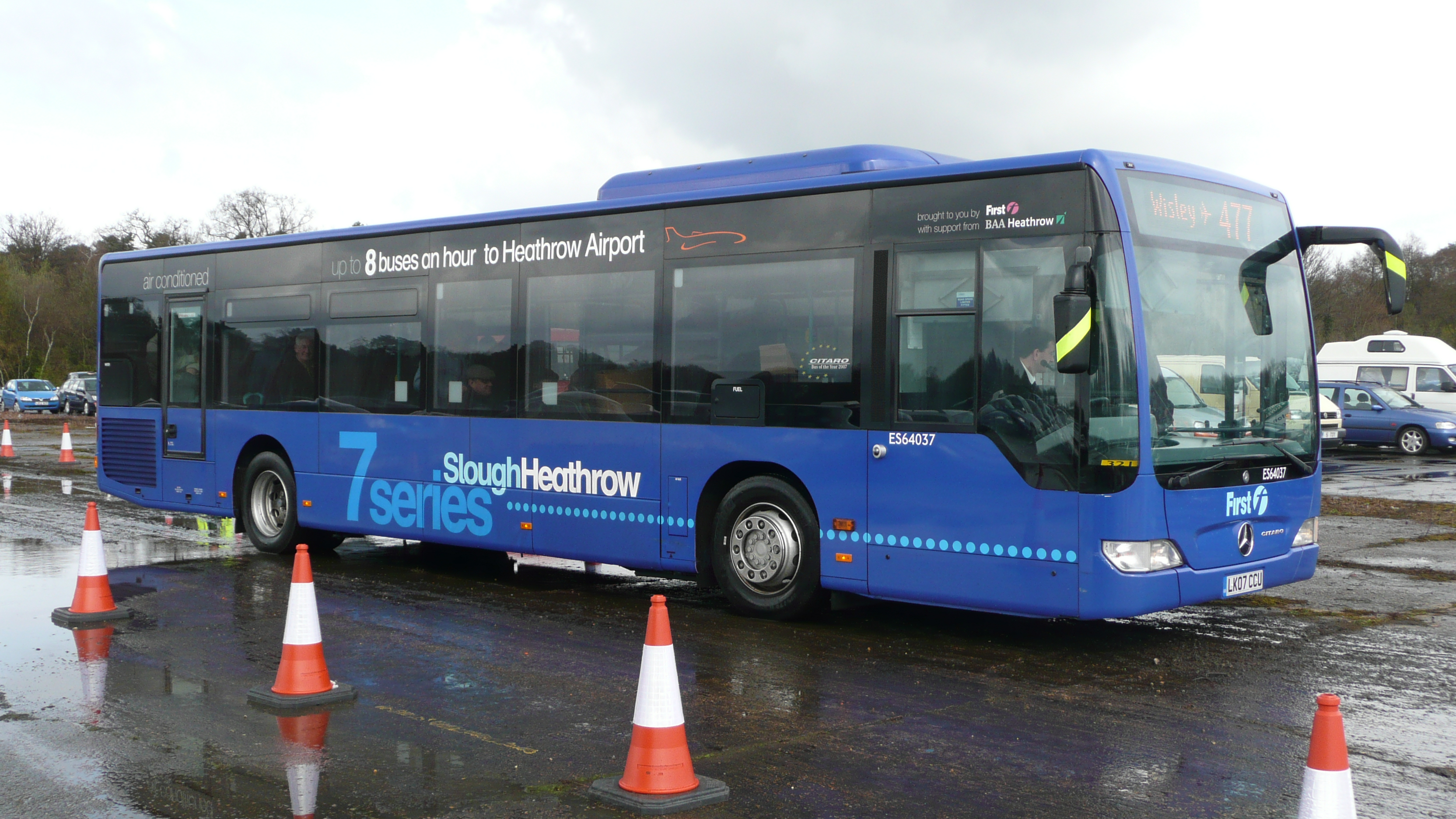
A First Berkshire & The Thames Valley Mercedes-Benz Citaro

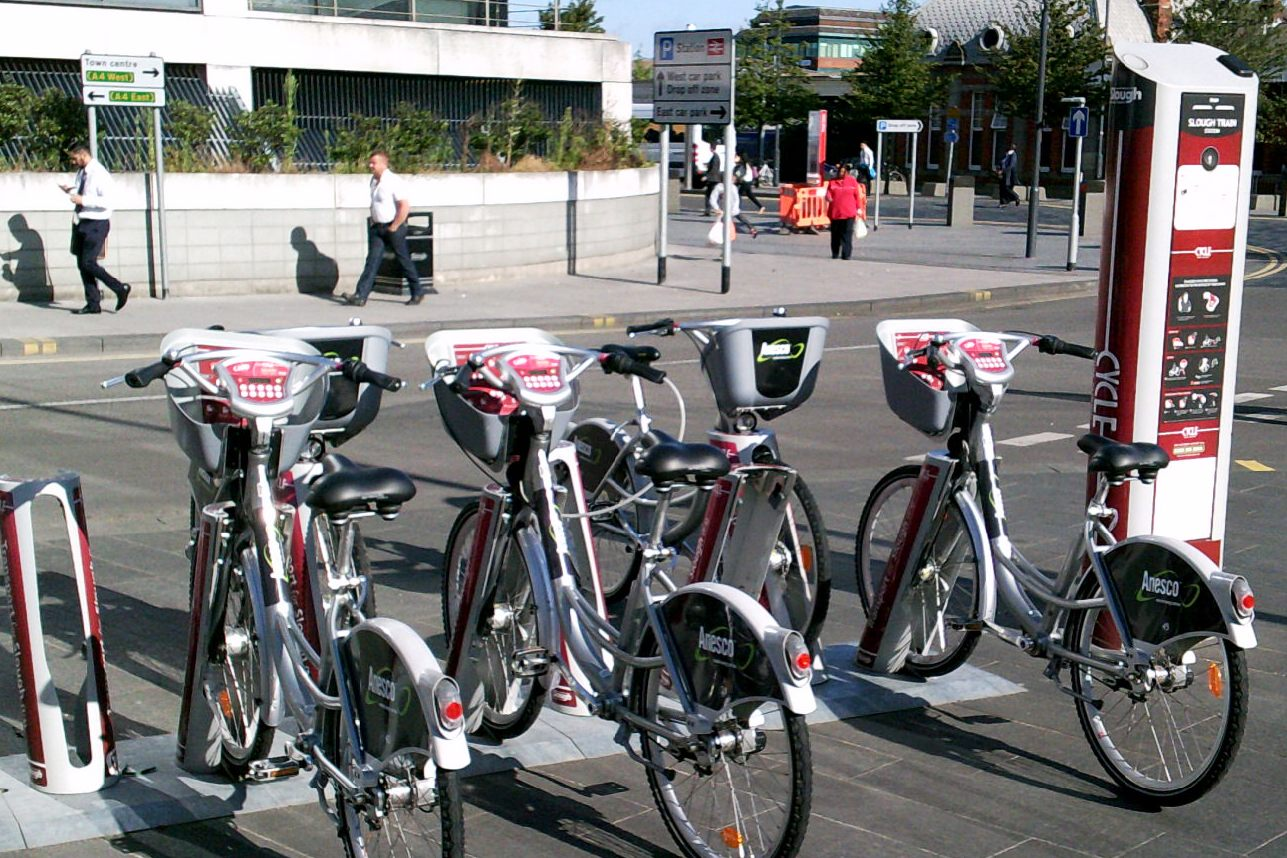
The Cycle to Hire scheme was launched in Slough in late 2013.

=== Road ===
Located roughly 20 miles (32 km) west of Central London, Slough is a commuter town near Heathrow Airport (7 miles (11 km) south-east), Uxbridge (6 miles (9.7 km) north-east), Maidenhead (5 miles (8.0 km) west) and Staines (7 miles (11 km) south-east). Slough residents also commute to Windsor, Reading and Bracknell as well as Central London. There are large passenger movements in the morning and evening rush hours. Road transport in Slough includes:

- Within Slough: Buses (First Berkshire & The Thames Valley, Arriva Shires & Essex, Redline & Carousel Buses (only Sundays)), taxis, minicabs and private cars on roads are also used.
- To Heathrow Airport: First Berkshire & The Thames Valley bus routes 75, 76, 77 and 78 serve Slough town centre, Langley and Heathrow Airport. First also run bus routes 71 (via Windsor, Egham & Staines-upon-Thames) and 60/61 (via Datchet, Horton & Wraysbury) to Heathrow Terminal 5. Taxis and minicabs are also available at a higher cost.
- To Central London: Buses and Greenline coaches are available, but rail is more generally used as express trains connect Slough to London Paddington in 14 minutes.
- To Birmingham: Bharat Coaches provide services from Southall to Birmingham/Wolverhampton/Coventry/Leeds/Bradford and Leicester via Slough.
- Slough is bounded by the M4 to the south and is served by junctions 5, 6 and 7; other roads serving the town include the A4, A355, and A412.

=== Rail ===
Slough is served by Great Western Railway stations at Burnham, Slough and Langley. Slough station is a junction between the Great Western Main Line and the Slough to Windsor & Eton Line to allow passengers to connect for Windsor & Eton Central.

Reading: Great Western Railway operate fast services to Reading every half an hour which take about 15 minutes, as well as slow services every fifteen minutes which take 30 minutes.

London Paddington: Great Western Railway operate express services to London every half an hour which take 14 minutes, as well as slow services every fifteen minutes taking 26 minutes.

Slough has services on the Elizabeth line, a new railway line across central London that opened in 2022.

The Western Rail Approach to Heathrow is a £500m rail project announced by the Department for Transport; Network Rail announced the route in 2014. It will directly serve Slough with four trains every hour, reducing travel times to Heathrow to six minutes. It is expected to be operational in the early 2020s.

=== Cycling ===
National Cycle Route 61 runs through central Slough. A Smoove bike sharing system was launched in October 2013, targeting commuters travelling between the trading estate and nearby railway stations.

=== Canal ===
Slough is connected by the Slough Arm to the main line of the Grand Union Canal which runs between the Thames at Brentford and Birmingham. It travels from the terminus basin at Stoke Road to the junction with the main line at Cowley Peachey; it was restored to navigability in 1975 having been disused since 1960.

== Museum ==
Slough Museum was established in 1986.

== Sports ==
Slough has a senior non-League football team, Slough Town F.C., who currently play in the National League South.

Slough Cricket Club play at the Upton Park ground.

Slough RFC is a rugby club that also plays at Upton Park.

Slough Hockey Club is a field hockey club that also plays at Upton Park and competes in the Women's England Hockey League and the South Central Hockey League.

Slough Jets is an ice hockey team that plays in the NIHL South Division 1.

Reading F.C. Women's and Republic of Ireland Women's goalkeeper Grace Moloney was born and lives in the town.

== Education ==
There are numerous primary and secondary schools serving Slough. Of the latter there are four state grammar schools. In addition, East Berkshire College has a campus in the area. Slough schools are in the top 10 best performers in the country at GCSE level. In 2011, 68.1% of pupils left school with a minimum of 5 A*-C grades (with English and maths). The national average is 58.9%.

Thames Valley University (Slough Campus) is currently closed due to the Heart of Slough project. The new campus was scheduled to be opened in 2013 as part of the University of West London, but as of March 2022 there had been no progress, as the former site of the university had been sold for housing.

== In popular culture ==
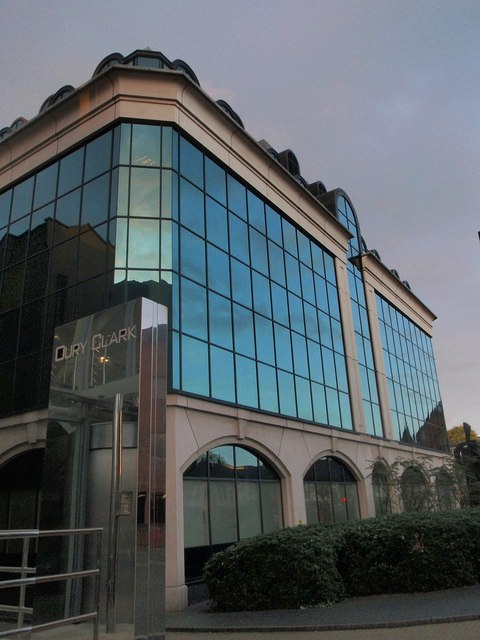
Observatory House was given its name because it is the site where astronomer William Herschel lived, and erected his great 40-foot telescope.

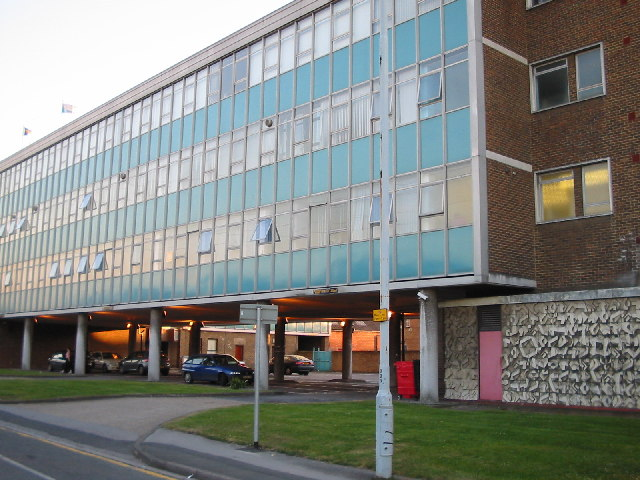
Crossbow House features in the opening sequences and some filming for the BBC comedy The Office.

- 1872: Edward Lear made reference to Slough in More Nonsense Pictures, Rhymes, Botany, etc:

There was an old person of Slough,
Who danced at the end of a bough;
But they said, 'If you sneeze,
You might damage the trees,
You imprudent old person of Slough.'

- 1932: (but set in the 26th century) In Aldous Huxley's Brave New World, the chimneys of Slough Crematorium, around which Bernard Marx flies, are used to demonstrate the physio-chemical equality of all people. (Slough's actual crematorium, in the cemetery in Stoke Road, was opened in 1963, coincidentally the year of Huxley's death. Princess Margaret was cremated there in 2002.)
- 1937: The poet John Betjeman wrote his poem Slough as a protest against the new town and 850 factories that had arisen in what had been formerly a rural area, which he considered an onslaught on the rural lifestyle:

Come, friendly bombs and fall on Slough
It isn't fit for humans now
There isn't grass to graze a cow.
Swarm over, death!

The poem was published two years before the outbreak of the Second World War, in which Britain (including Slough itself) experienced bombing from enemy air raids. On the centenary of his birth, his daughter said her father "regretted having ever written it", presenting the Mayor David MacIsaac with a book of his poems in which she had written: "We love Slough".

- 1979: Slough is mentioned by name in the hit single "The Eton Rifles" by the Jam from the album Setting Sons: "There's a row going on down near Slough"
- 1991: The film Buddy's Song has exteriors filmed mainly on the Britwell Estate and the Farnham Road (A355).
- 1996: The Tiger Lillies' album The Brothel to the Cemetery includes a track called "Slough", probably inspired by Betjeman's poem. The lyrics to the chorus are:

Drop a bomb on Slough, Drop a bomb on Slough
Drop a bomb on Slough, Drop a bomb on Slough

- 1998: The song "Costa del Slough" by the rock band Marillion posits the town as a post-global warming coastal resort, possibly in a reference to the comedian Spike Milligan having presented Slough on TV as a holiday resort.
- 2001: The BBC comedy series The Office was set in the sales office of a paper company in Slough, presenting it as a depressing post-industrial wasteland. The character David Brent comments on Betjeman's poem in the series, which also appears on the inside sleeve of the video and DVD of series 1. In the US version, the office is located on "Slough Avenue" in Scranton, Pennsylvania.
- 2004: Slough is mentioned on the ABC series Lost in the episode "Homecoming" of season 1. In a flashback of Charlie's life, a woman he knows says her father is away purchasing a paper company in Slough.
- 2005- The BBC Two series Making Slough Happy involves a team of psychologists who, for three months, attempt to increase the overall happiness levels of fifty ordinary Slough residents.
- 2009: In episode 8, series 1 of The Legend of Dick and Dom, a CBBC show, the characters find themselves in modern-day Slough.
- 2010-2025: In the Slough House novels by Mick Herron and the adapted Apple+ TV series Slow Horses, Slough House is the MI5 branch where washed-up spies are sent to finish their failed careers on desk duty. The name derives from the fact that, as Slough is distant from London, similarly Slough House is equally far away from the headquarters of MI5 in Regents Park for the disgraced spies hoping to revive their careers.
- 2015: The Sky One/NBC comedy drama series You, Me and the Apocalypse is set in Slough, where a nuclear bunker is located underneath the Slough Trading Estate. Aerial views are seen of Slough throughout the series.
- 2016: Ricky Gervais, in his role as David Brent from The Office, released the song Slough on his album Life on the Road, the soundtrack to the film by the same title. The chorus runs:

Oh oh oh Slough (echo: Slough)
My kind of town
I don't know how
Anyone could put you down

== Crime ==
Slough has a relatively high crime rate. Figures for all crime categories are annually above the English average and figures for a few categories are at more than double the frequency. In September 2013, Slough had the second worst rate of crime among local authority areas in the Thames Valley Police counties, 87 recorded crimes per 1,000 population vs Oxford's 104.

The borough's crime rate reduced by 29% in the ten years to 2013. In the year ending September 2017, the crime rate in Slough was the third highest in the Thames Valley force area, behind Reading (96.42 police recorded crimes per 1000 population) and Oxford (100.71 for the same metric).

== See also ==
- List of people from Slough
