= St Mary's Parish Church, Slough =

St Mary Parish Church, Slough
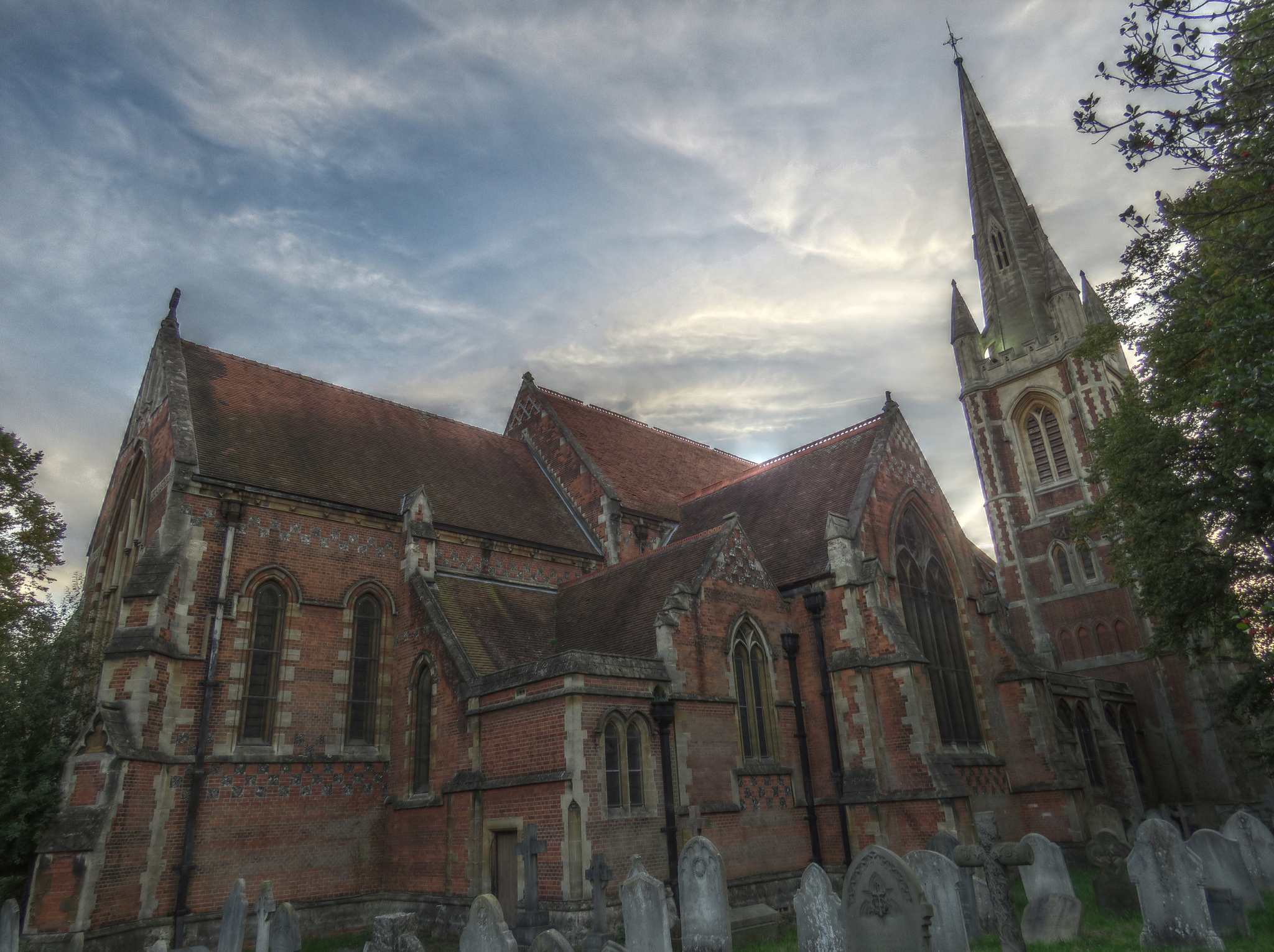
- St Mary Parish Church, Slough
- 51.50676°N 0.59455°W
- OS grid reference: SU 97634 79581
- Location: Slough
- Country: England
- Denomination: Church of England
- Website: http://www.stmarys-slough.org.uk/

History
- Dedication: St Mary

Architecture
- Functional status: Active
- Heritage designation: Grade II*
- Architectural type: Gothic
- Completed: 1876 - 1878

Administration
- Diocese: Oxford
- Parish: Upton cum Chalvey

St Mary's Parish Church is a red brick gothic style Church of England parish church in the parish of Upton cum Chalvey in the borough of Slough and the county of Berkshire in England. Built between 1876–8 to a design by John Oldrid Scott and partly funded through a personal donation by Queen Victoria, it was again enlarged in 1911–1913, and is protected as a grade II* listed building. The grounds contain the grade II listed war memorial by the west door of the church, inscribed with over 300 names of the dead from Slough in the First and Second World Wars. The walls and gates of the church yard are also protected grade II listed features. The church is located centrally in the parish, serving the Slough town centre. The church is linked to two schools in the area, Saint Mary's Church of England Primary School, in Upton, and Slough and Eton Church of England Secondary School, in Chalvey. The building regularly plays host to musical concerts, often including accompaniment on the organ

== Organ ==
The church contains a pipe organ in the English Romantic style, built in 1912 by Norman and Beard. It features three manuals, 37 stops and over 2,400 pipes. It is pitched to the French diapason. At its dedication it was played by noted organist and composer Sir Walter Parratt.

== Bells ==
The church tower is home to a ring of ten bells, the tenor weighing 17½ cwt. The original bells were cast in 1619 by Richard Eldridge, of which only one survives. The nine newer bells were all cast by the Whitechapel Bell Foundry, the last two being added after the others as a memorial donation in 1949.

== Notable people ==
- A stained glass window was designed in 1915 for St Mary's by artist and poet Alfred Wolmark.
- The church hosted the funeral of Letty Lind in 1923.
- A lost work of Eric Fogg, The Seasons, was re-scored and performed at St Mary's Church on 13 September 2003 to celebrate the centenary of Fogg's birth.

== Parish of Upton-cum-Chalvey ==
St Mary's is linked within the parish of Upton-cum-Chalvey with two other churches: the grade I listed St Laurence's, in Upton, to the east, and the church of St Peter in Chalvey, to the west.

== In the News ==
It has been reported that a woman was raped in the church yard at approximately 7:45pm on Wednesday, January 30, 2019. In the following month, three men were arrested and questioned by the police and subsequently released without charge. In February, the police renewed a call for anyone who may have information to come forward.
