= History of Slough =

Slough /ˈslaʊ/ is a town and unitary authority (Borough of Slough) in the English county of Berkshire, just to the west of Greater London. Until 1974 the town was in Buckinghamshire.

The town developed in the 19th and 20th centuries from a number of villages, mainly in Buckinghamshire, along the Great West Road, with growth being accelerated by the construction of the Great Western Railway and later by the Slough Trading Estate.

In the 2001 census the population was 119,070 (est. 122,000 in 2006). It is one of the most ethnically diverse towns in the UK, situated some 22 miles (35 km) west of central London and 20 miles (32 km) east of Reading.

== History ==
=== Prehistory ===
Evidence of Slough's prehistoric past can be found in its archaeology. Britwell and Farnham Royal sit on the Lynch Hill Gravel terraces, which is one of the best areas for prehistoric artefacts in the Thames Valley. Excavations in Cippenham during the early twenty-first century show evidence of human activity through time, with Mesolithic finds, Neolithic pits, a Bronze Age occupation site and cemetery, and late Iron Age/Roman features. There is also evidence of Roman sites (43 AD to 409 AD) from finds of pottery sherds and coins as well as features such as ditches and hearths.

=== Medieval history ===
Most of the area was traditionally part of Buckinghamshire and formed over many years by the amalgamation of villages along the Great West Road from London in the east to Bath and Bristol in the west. The first recorded uses of the name occur as Slo in 1196, Sloo in 1336, and Le Slowe, Slowe or Slow in 1437. The name may have derived from the various sloughs in the area caused by rain water flowing from the Chiltern Hills to the River Thames, or it may refer instead to Sloe bushes growing in the vicinity. The name first seems to have applied to a hamlet between Upton to the east and Chalvey to the west, roughly around the 'Crown Crossroads' where the road to Windsor (now the A332) met the Great West Road. Along with Salt Hill, these settlements formed the parish of Upton-cum-Chalvey.

The Domesday Survey of 1086, refers to Upton, and a wood for 200 pigs, worth £15. Upton, with its Norman Church, was situated at the top of the slope from the river terrace - the various levels in the area having been formed in the Ice-Age.

In 1196, one Henry de Slo is mentioned in a Pipe roll - the earliest documentary reference found to Slough.

During the 13th century, King Henry III had a palace in Cippenham: the spot (now a scheduled monument) is still marked on modern maps as "Cippenham Moat". St Laurence's Church in Upton is around 900 years old and is the oldest building in Slough. Parts of Upton Court were built in 1325, while St Mary's Church in Langley was probably built in the late 11th or early 12th century, though it has been rebuilt and enlarged several times.

Montem Mound, also known as Salt Hill (originally Salts Hill) is in Chalvey. Its date of origin is not known, but it is now a scheduled monument. Eton College held its 'Eton Montem' ceremonies here until 1844. The surrounding area to the north of Chalvey and the Great West Road is also known as Salt Hill and includes Salt Hill Park. Salt Hill Park once boasted great iron gates, which were subsequently smelted as part of the war effort during World War II.

=== The stagecoach era ===
From the mid-17th century, stagecoaches began to pass through Slough, and a 1727 Act of Parliament established the Colnbrook Turnpike Trust to manage the Great West road from Cranford Bridge to Maidenhead Bridge. Slough and Salt Hill became locations for the second stage to change horses on the journey out from London. Coaching inns, such as the Crown in Slough, and the Windmill and Castle (Botham's) inns in Salt Hill, grew up along the Great West Road to service the traffic between London and the West. Neither of those survive, although the Red Cow (Upton) still exists as a pub.

The astronomer William Herschel (1738–1822), and his sister Caroline, produced the first true map of the universe with a 40-foot (12 m) long, 49 inch reflecting telescope he built in his garden in Windsor Road, Slough. A monument in Windsor Road commemorates his achievement. William married and is buried in Church of St Laurence, Upton-cum-Chalvey. It is believed that Joseph Haydn visited Slough and met Herschel during his time there. According to one account, Haydn asked the esteemed astronomer for his opinion on the Biblical story of the seven days of Creation. Herschel's answer is unknown, but - so the story goes - Haydn went back to his lodgings and began to compose his famous oratorio The Creation.

By 1838 and the opening of the Great Western Railway, Upton-cum-Chalvey's parish population had reached 1,502 - but this was exceeded by the neighbouring parish of Langley Marish (1,797). If Slough was known at all, it was as a source of bricks, and of hotels where visitors to the royal family at Windsor Castle might lodge.

=== From the coming of the railway to the founding of the trading estate ===
The Great Western Railway opened in Slough in June 1838. Initially, opposition from Eton College prevented the construction of a station and trains 'happened' to be held at Slough allowing passengers to board: tickets were sold from the Crown coaching inn and subsequently from the newly built North Star Inn. However, a station was built and opened by June 1840, and Queen Victoria made her first ever railway journey, from Slough station to Bishop's Bridge near Paddington, on 13 June 1842 - some three years after her husband Prince Albert who had first travelled from the trackside at Slough to Paddington on 14 November 1839.

In 1849, a branch line was completed from Slough Station to Windsor & Eton Central railway station for the Queen's greater convenience. Originally, the headmaster of Eton College, Dr. John Keate, had resisted efforts to place a station closer to Eton College than Slough, because he feared that it would "interfere with the discipline of the school, the studies and amusements of the boys, affecting the healthiness of the place, from the increase of floods, and endangering even the lives of boys."

On 1 January 1845, John Tawell, who had recently returned from Australia, murdered his lover, Sarah Hart, at Salt Hill in Slough by poisoning her with prussic acid. With various officials in chase, Tawell fled to Slough Station and boarded a train to Paddington. Fortunately, the electrical telegraph had recently been installed and so a message was sent ahead to Paddington with Tawell's details. Tawell was trailed and subsequently arrested, tried and executed for the murder at Aylesbury on 28 March 1845. This is believed to be the first time ever that the telegraph had been involved in the apprehension of a murderer.

Even as industrialisation began, Slough was seen as a comfortable (but accessible) retreat from London. In 1843 the development of Upton Park began, while from 1866 to 1868, Charles Dickens rented Elizabeth Cottage on the High Street, under the name of Charles Tringham. This was most likely to be closer to his mistress, Ellen Ternan. Dickens' second link to the town was his publisher, Richard Bentley, proprietor of the publishing firm 'Bentley's'.

In 1863 Slough became a local government area for the first time, when a Slough Local Board of Health was elected to represent what is now the central part of the modern Borough. This part of Upton-cum-Chalvey Parish became an urban sanitary district in 1875 and an urban district in 1894.

The Grand Junction Canal spur arrived in 1882, and, during the mid-to-late 19th century, the arrival of the large-scale brickmaking industry into Langley and the area north of the Great West Road, saw dramatic growth northwards encroaching on the very south of the parish of Stoke Poges. This new development saw the population centre of the town move northwards and the name Slough suppressed Upton-cum-Chalvey. The part of that parish not originally included in the Slough Urban District was incorporated in 1900.

The Church of England ecclesiastical parish of Upton-cum-Chalvey still exists, however, and includes the parish church of St Mary, and the churches of St Laurence (Upton) and St Peter (Chalvey). St Laurence's church overlooks Upton Court - now the administrative home of the Slough Observer newspaper - famously said to be haunted by a young woman in a blood-stained nightdress.

Slough has 96 listed buildings. There are four Grade I: St Laurence's church (Upton), St Mary the Virgin's church (Langley), Baylis House and Godolphin Court; seven Grade II*: St Mary's church (Upton-cum-Chalvey), Upton Court, the Kederminster and Seymour Almshouses in Langley, St Peter's church (Chalvey), The Ostrich Inn (Colnbrook), King John's Palace (Colnbrook); and Grade II listed structures include four milestones, Slough station, and Beech, Oak and Linden Houses at Upton Hospital.

=== Post-trading estate ===
1918 saw a large area of agricultural land to the west of Slough developed as an army motor repair depot, used to store and repair huge numbers of motor vehicles coming back from World War I in Flanders.

In April 1920 the Government sold the site and its contents to the Slough Trading Co. Ltd. Repair of ex-army vehicles continued until 1925 when the Slough Trading Company Act was passed allowing the company (renamed Slough Estates Ltd) to establish an Industrial Estate. Spectacular growth and employment ensued, with Slough attracting workers from many parts of the UK and abroad. Large housing estates were built to cater for these workers and their families, notably Manor Park and Cippenham.

There was a major extension of the Slough Urban District in 1930. The local government district expanded westward, and was divided into wards for the first time (the new areas of Burnham, Farnham and Stoke as well as the divisions of the old district Central, Chalvey, Langley and Upton). In 1938 the town received its first royal charter and became a municipal borough. See the list of mayors of Slough, which starts with the charter mayor in 1938, who became the first elected mayor in November 1938.

The new town and the factories being built drew a protest poem in 1937 from John Betjeman, called Slough, beginning "Come friendly bombs and fall on Slough...". Ironically, during the Second World War, the town, which also became home to an Emergency Hospital for casualties from London, experienced a series of air raids, most frequently in October 1940. Local air raid deaths and a smaller number of deaths at the Emergency Hospital account for the 23 civilian lives recorded lost in Slough Municipal Borough.

After the war, several further large housing developments arose to take large numbers of people migrating from war-damaged London, notably the London County Council estates at Britwell and Langley, and the borough council estate at Wexham Court (then outside the area of the borough).

In the early 1970s the main A4 road was routed onto Wellington Street, north of and parallel to the High Street. This re-routing allowed the building of a major shopping complex, Queensmere, between the High Street and Wellington Street. Slough was incorporated into Berkshire from Buckinghamshire in the 1974 local government reorganisation. The old Municipal Borough was abolished and replaced by a Non-metropolitan district authority, which was made a Borough by the town's second Royal Charter. Britwell and Wexham Court became part of Slough at this time, with their own parish councils.

On 1 April 1995, the Borough of Slough expanded slightly into Buckinghamshire and Surrey, to take in Colnbrook and Poyle, which received a joint parish council. Slough became a unitary authority on 1 April 1998, with the abolition of Berkshire County Council and the 1973–1998 Borough. The present unitary authority was created a Borough by the town's third Royal charter.
