= Bheja Fry =

Bheja Fry may refer to:

- Bejha fry or bheja (also maghaz), an offal brain dish from India
- Bheja Fry, an Indian Hindi-language comedy film series
  - Bheja Fry (film), a 2007 film, first part of the series
  - Bheja Fry 2, a 2011 sequel to the 2007 film
