= Sauce ravigote =

Classic, lightly acidic sauce in French cuisine

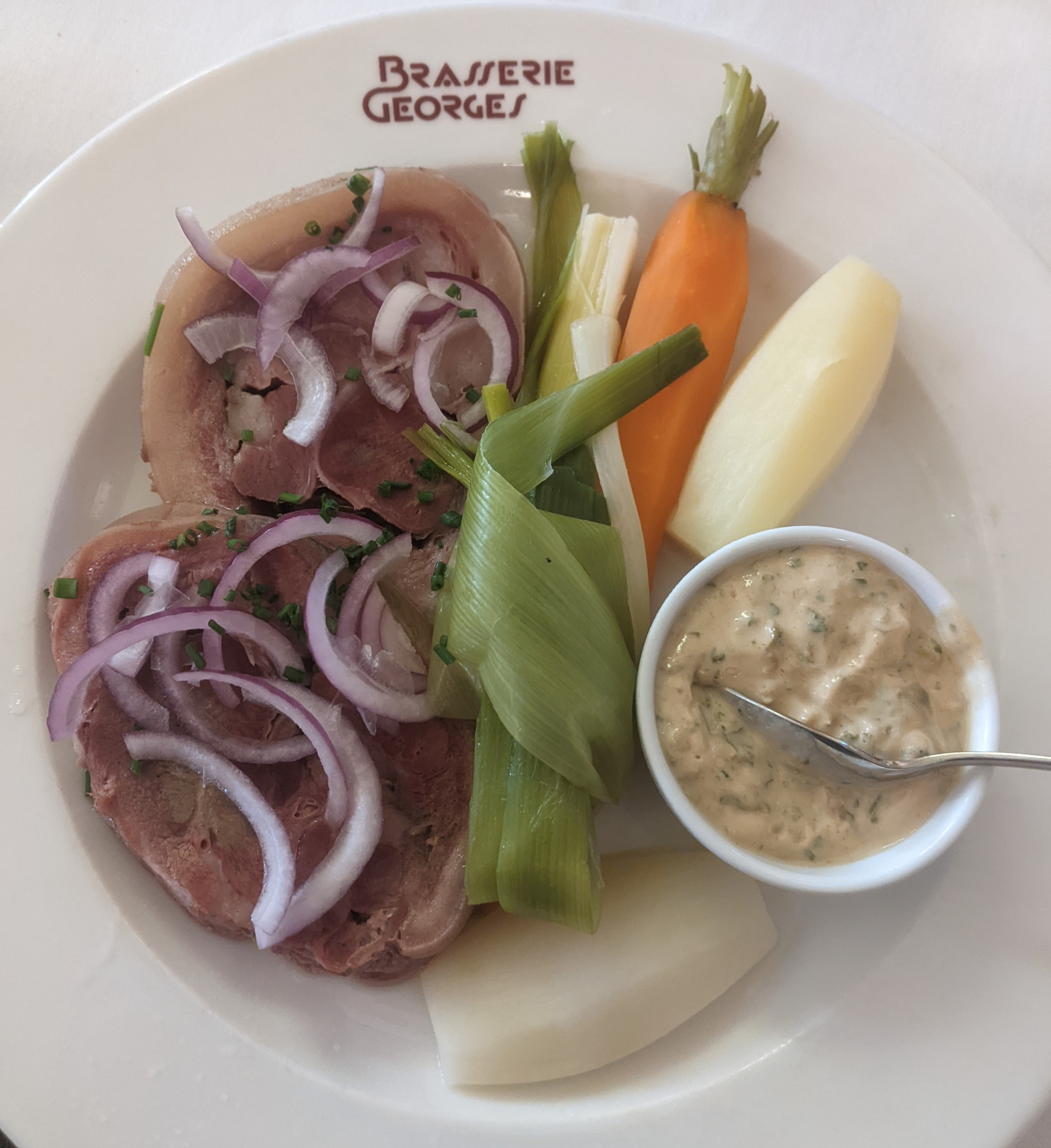
Sauce ravigote (right, in the small dish) served with tête de veau (calf's head), leeks, carrots, and steamed potatoes.

Sauce ravigote (French pronunciation: [sos ʁaviɡɔt]) is a classic, lightly acidic sauce in French cuisine, which may be prepared either warm or cold. The warm sauce is classically based on a vegetable or meat broth, or a velouté, with herbs. Current recipes often add Dijon mustard. The cold sauce is based on a vinaigrette.

Many other preparations pass under the term ravigote, but in general ravigote sauces are highly seasoned with chopped, sautéed shallots or onion, capers and herbs like chives, chervil and tarragon: ravigoté connotes "reinvigorated" or "freshened up". It is generally served with mild-flavored proteins or those that have been boiled or poached, such as fish, fowl, eggs, and, traditionally, with tête de veau, jellied hare, head cheese, pâté or calf's brains and feet.
