= Sauce gribiche =

Cold egg sauce

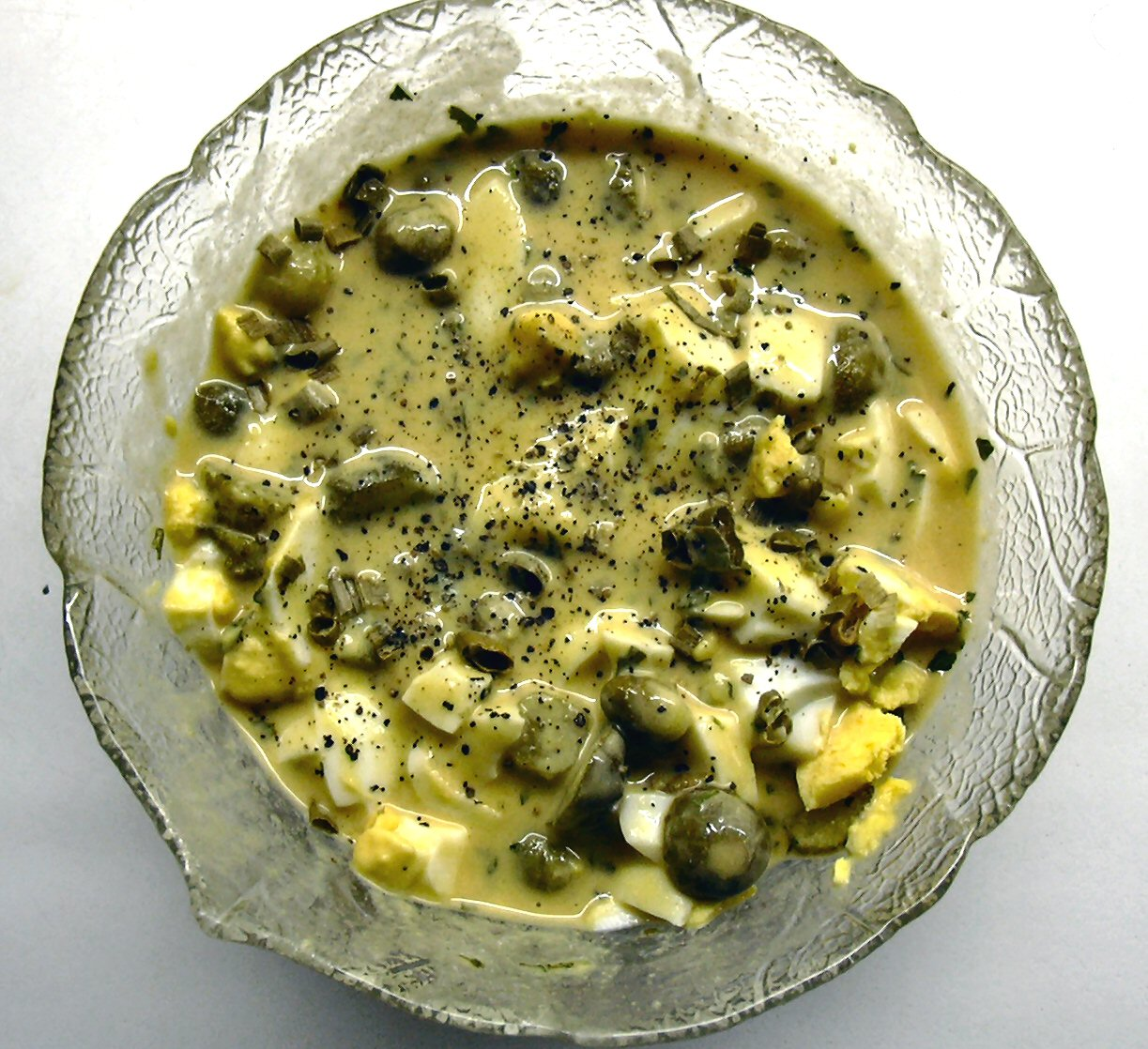
- Sauce gribiche
- Type: Sauce
- Course: Condiment
- Associated cuisine: French cuisine
- Main ingredients: Hard-boiled egg yolks, mustard, vegetable oil
- Ingredients generally used: Chopped vegetables, capers, parsley, tarragon
- Similar dishes: Mayonnaise

Sauce gribiche (French pronunciation: [sos ɡʁibiʃ]) is a cold egg sauce in French cuisine, made by emulsifying hard-boiled egg yolks and mustard with a neutral oil like canola or grapeseed. The sauce is finished with chopped pickled cucumbers, capers, parsley, chervil, and tarragon. It also includes hard-boiled egg whites cut in a julienne.

Classically, sauce gribiche may be served with boiled chicken, fish (hot or cold), calf's head, tripe, or cold terrine. Modern variations pair sauce gribiche with vegetables, such as asparagus, charred lettuce or leeks, or served as a dip.

== See also ==
- Mayonnaise
- Tartar sauce
