= Tête de veau =

Dish made of a calf's head

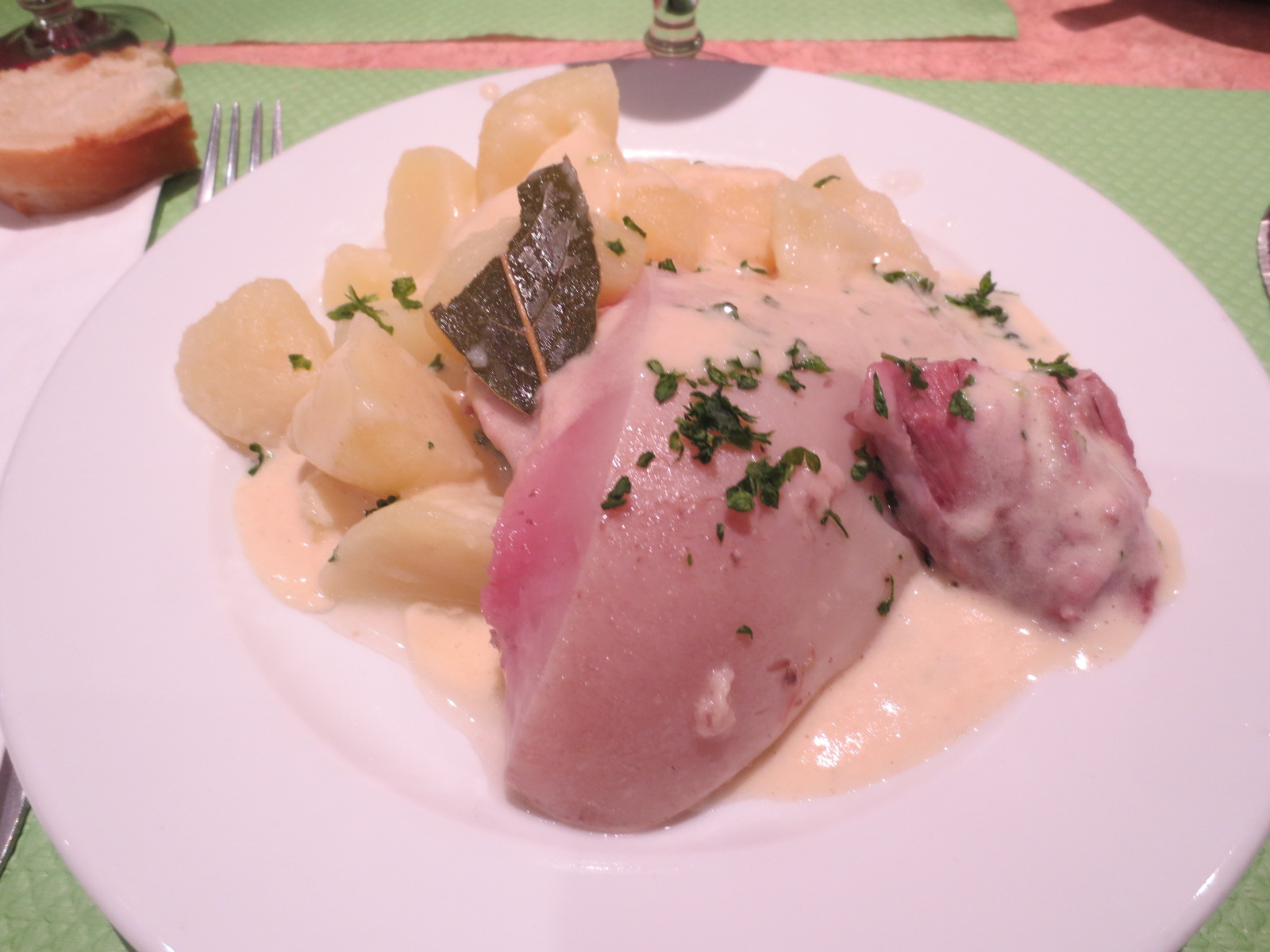
Tête de veau

Calf's head, or [la] tête de veau (French; pl.: [les] têtes de veau), [la] testina di vitello (Italian; pl.: [le] testine di vitello), [der] Kalbskopf (German; pl.: [die] Kalbsköpfe) and [de] kalfskop (Dutch; pl.: [de] kalfskoppen) is a dish consisting of a calf's head, commonly found in French, Belgian, German, Swiss, and Italian cuisine.

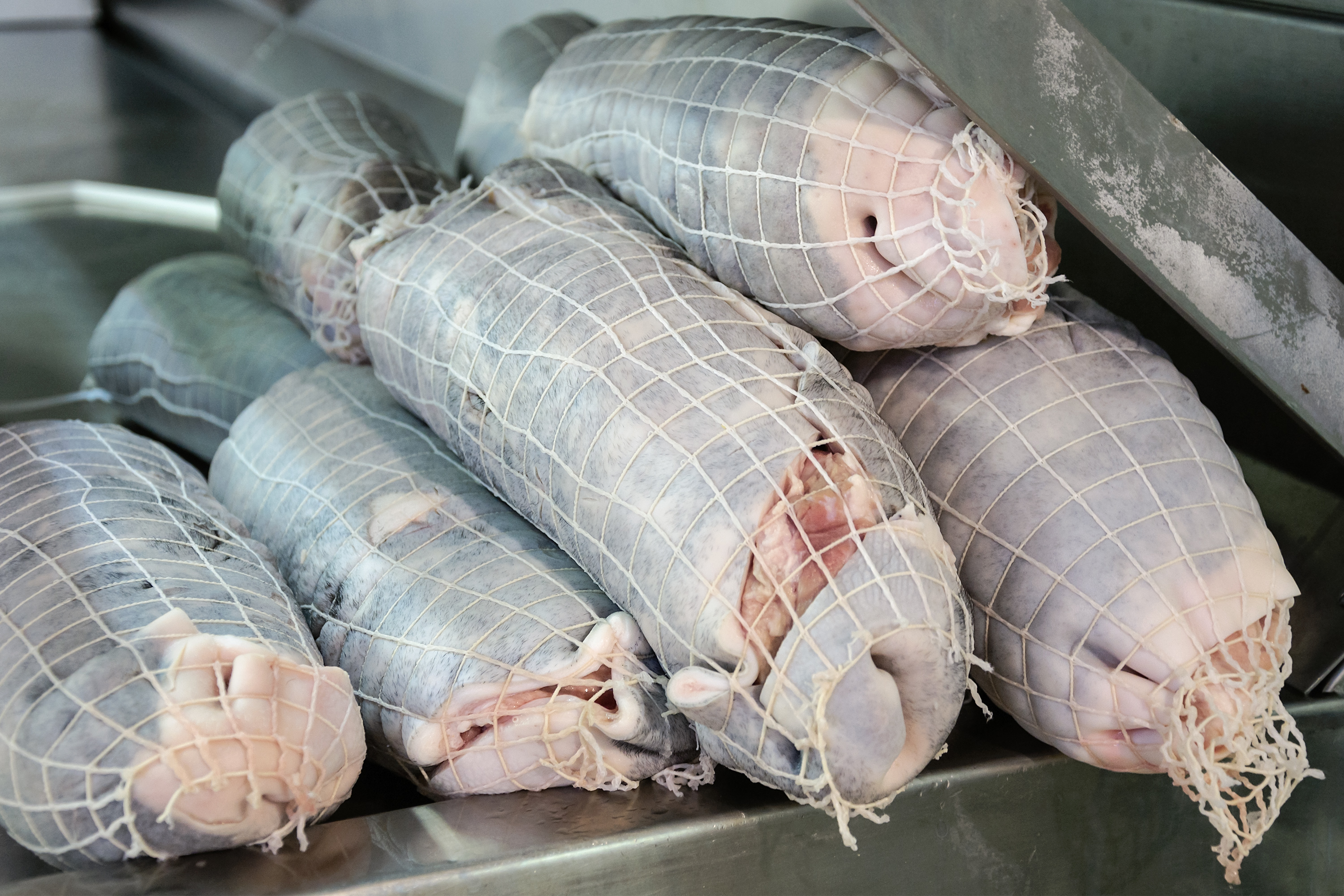
Raw têtes de veau, boned and rolled, ready for cooking, at the Rungis International Market

The French delicacy [la] tête de veau ("calf's head") is also called [la] cervelle de veau ("calf's brain", pl. [les] cervelles de veau).

Tête de veau may be served whole or boned. When boned, it is rolled and held together with string. It is usually poached, but it may also be roasted. It may be served hot or cold, often with a vinaigrette or ravigote sauce. Cold, it may be served in slices.

A dish in Belgium is [la] tête de veau en tortue ("calf's head as a tortoise/turtle"), served with tomato sauce with Madeira and accompanied by French fries. This may be linked with English mock turtle soup, known in Lower Saxony as Mockturtle, a soup made from calf's head prepared and seasoned to resemble green turtle soup.

== See also ==
- Head cheese
