= Monjayaki =

Japanese pan-fried batter

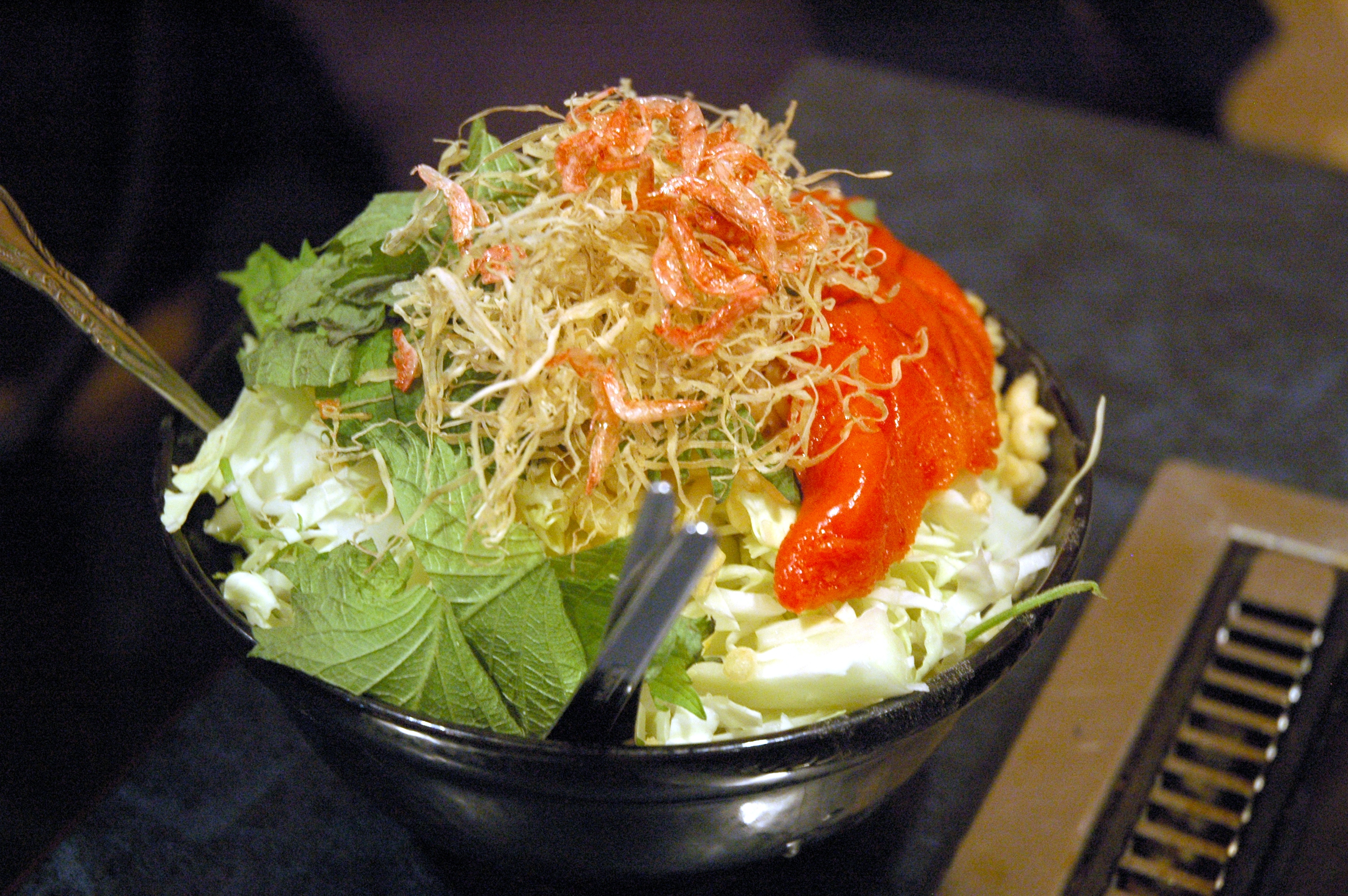
Monjayaki before cooking

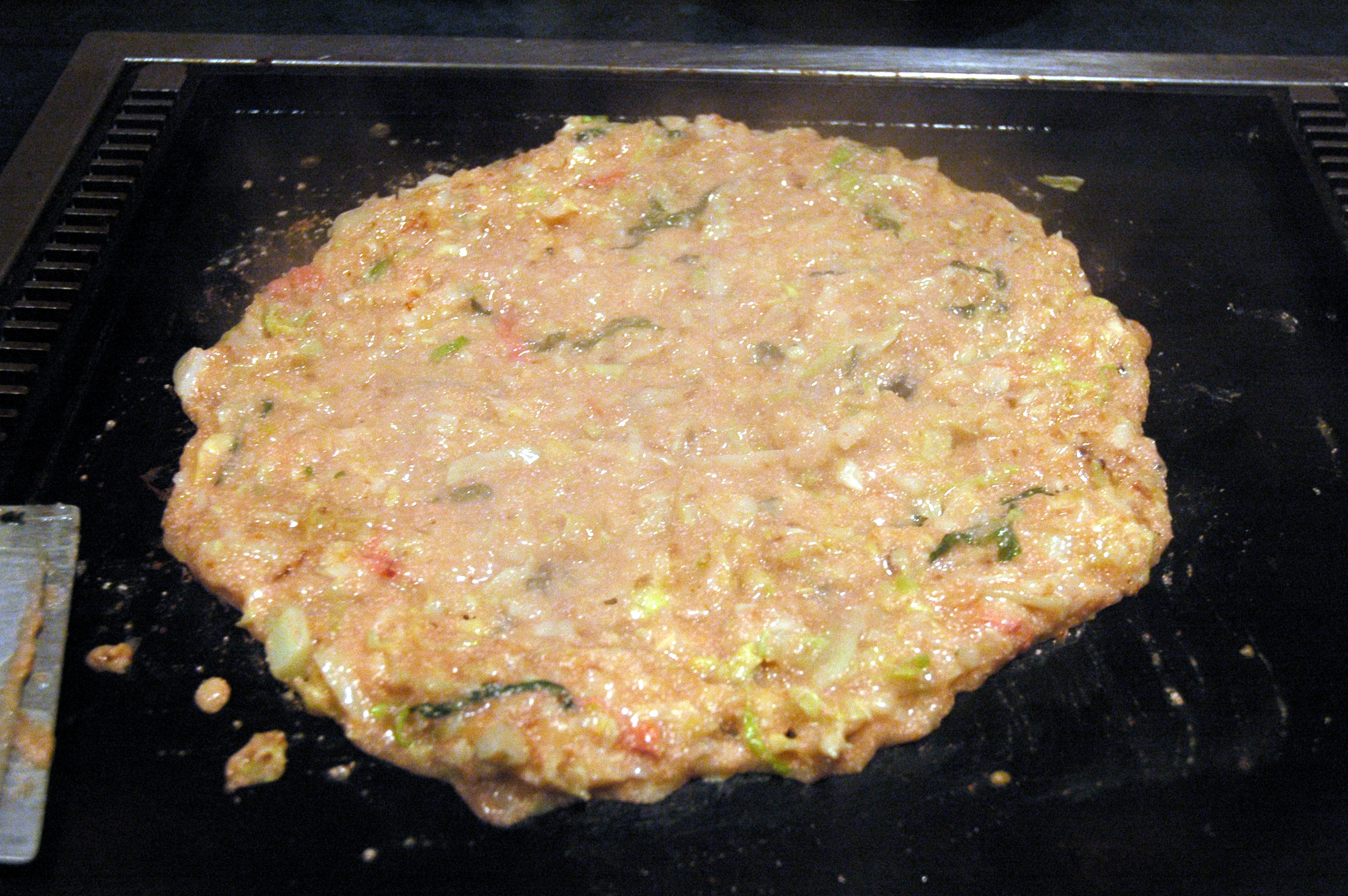
Monjayaki after cooking

Monjayaki (もんじゃ焼き; often called simply "monja") is a type of Japanese pan-fried batter, popular in the Kantō region, similar to okonomiyaki, but using different liquid ingredients.

== Ingredients ==
Like okonomiyaki, the base of monjayaki is wheat flour and cabbage, with additional ingredients like meat, seafood or mentaiko added according to the diner's preference. However, additional dashi or water is added to the monjayaki batter mixture, making it runnier than okonomiyaki. The ingredients are finely chopped and mixed into the batter before frying. The consistency of cooked monjayaki is comparable to melted cheese.

Diners eat directly from the grill using a small spatula. Monjayaki diners also participate in the cooking by spreading raw monja on the grill so that crispy bits form and caramelize. Many monjayaki restaurants can be found in the Tsukishima district of Tokyo where the dish is said to have originated. Most of these restaurants also serve regular okonomiyaki.

== See also ==
- Japanese cuisine
- Teppanyaki
- Okonomiyaki
- Tuslob buwa
