= Creier pane =

Romanian animal brain dish

- Course: Main course
- Serving temperature: Hot
- Main ingredients: Brain; Eggs; Wheat

Creier pane is a Romanian dish usually made using pig's brains, although cow or lamb's brains can also be used. While there are regional variations for the recipe, the most common way of preparing creier pane is boiling the organ and then coating it evenly in flour, egg and breadcrumbs before deep-frying it in oil. There are many traditional Romanian dishes based entirely on offal. The literal translation for Creier pane is Romanian breaded brain. The word pane come from French pané.
