= Mock turtle soup =

Soup made with calf's head

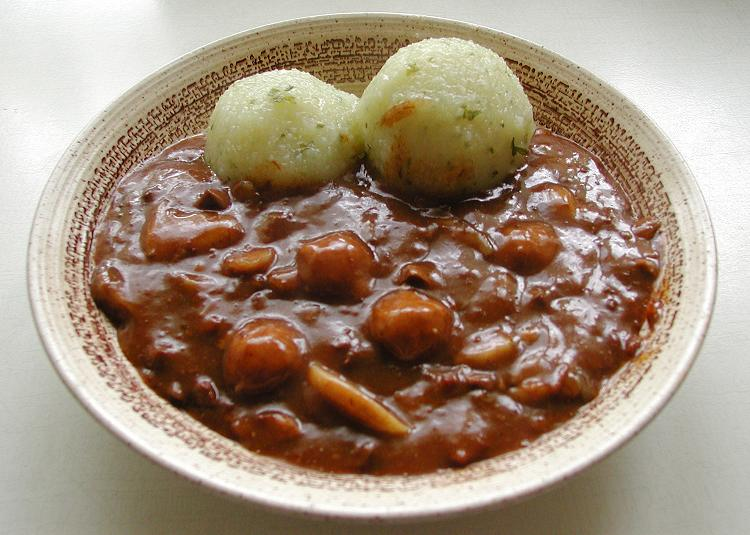
- Type: Soup
- Course: Main or soup
- Place of origin: England
- Serving temperature: Hot
- Main ingredients: Calf's head or beef; sherry, brandy, or wine; seasonings

Mock turtle soup is an English soup that was created in the mid-18th century as an imitation of green turtle soup. It often uses brains and organ meats such as calf's head to duplicate the texture and flavour of the original's turtle meat after the green turtles used to make the original dish were hunted nearly to extinction. In the United States, mock turtle soup eventually became more popular than the original dish and is still popular in Cincinnati. The soup is also a traditional dish in the Lower Saxony areas of Germany, where it is considered a speciality of English cuisine.

== History ==
Calf's head soups were known in England before importation of turtles began.

The soup was created in response to overhunting to near extinction of the turtles needed for the original dish. Turtle soup was known as early as the 1720s after sailors returning from the West Indies brought several green turtles home with them and was popular by the mid-18th century. By the late 19th century, commercial brands of canned mock turtle soup were available and advertising, ironically, warned consumers to "Beware of Imitations".

== Preparation ==
Natasha Frost, writing for Atlas Obscura, notes that the recipe isn't "particularly easy to prepare at home", as most versions call for dressing a calf's head, which was considered to mimic the texture and flavor of the turtle, and require overnight preparation. Other ingredients may include beef and hard-boiled eggs.

Hannah Glasse's The Art of Cookery (1751 edition) gives instruction on "How to dress a mock turtle" to make soup from a calf's head. By the 1758 edition she provides a recipe specifically for mock turtle soup. The 1821 Hamburg cookery book or complete instructions for cooking, especially for housewives in Hamburg and Lower Saxony contains a recipe that calls for malaga wine, brandy, and fish dumplings. The 1845 Modern Cookery for Private Families provides a recipe for an "old-fashioned" mock turtle soup. The 1887 White House Cook Book calls for seasonings including cayenne pepper, lemon, mace, and sherry. By the mid- to late-19th century most cookbooks contained a recipe for mock turtle soup.

19th century recipe collector Martha Lloyd gives a recipe for Mrs. Fowle's Mock Turtle Soup in her Household Book:

Take a large calf's head. Scald off the hair. Boil it until the horn is tender, then cut it into slices about the size of your finger, with as little lean as possible. Have ready three pints of good mutton or veal broth, put in it half a pint of Madeira wine, half a teaspoonful of thyme, pepper, a large onion, and the peel of a lemon chop't very small. A ¼ of a pint of oysters chop't very small, and their liquor; a little salt, the juice of two large onions, some sweet herbs, and the brains chop't. Stand all these together for about an hour, and send it up to the table with the forcemeat balls made small and the yolks of hard eggs.

Agnes Jekyll's 1922 recipe for consommé fausse tortue called for half a calf's brain and "a turtle tablet and some turtle soup herbs as sold at Stores."

Heston Blumenthal's updated version calls for beef bones and oxtail and is seasoned with star anise and red wine.

== England ==
Serving turtle soup in the 18th century was a display of wealth. The term "turtle soup" was used as a synonym for delicious food. Less-wealthy families opted for mock turtle soup, which became popular in its own right and according to Buttery became a "British classic" dish. Heinz made a commercial version.

== Germany ==
In the Oldenburg and Ammerland regions of Germany, Mockturtlesuppe is considered a specialty of English cuisine and dates from the time of the personal union between the Kingdom of Hanover and the Kingdom of Great Britain.

== United States ==
While green sea turtle was popular for soup making in many countries, U.S. recipes included many other local species. Soup made from snapping turtles is still available in certain parts of the country. Similarly, mock turtle soup recipes have a variety of substitute meats. Besides organ meats like the British recipes, recipes in the U.S. often use stewing beef or ground beef, but may call for alligator. Versions were served at Abraham Lincoln's first inauguration, at the Waldorf-Astoria, the St. Regis and the Plaza. A recipe for it appeared in the 1887 White House Cook Book. The mock version eventually became more popular than the original dish. It was on many 19th and early 20th-century menus but by the 1960s it was no longer commonly offered. During its period of popularity it was considered a classic comfort food and "found on every table".

The dish is still popular in Cincinnati, where butcher Phil Houck's version was so popular among customers that he stopped cutting meat and pivoted to production of the soup, founding in 1920 the brand Worthmore. Worthmore was the only remaining commercial brand of mock turtle soup, closing in 2014. In the early 1900s the soup was commonly served as a free lunch in the German saloons of Over-the-Rhine for customers purchasing beer and in 1980 it was still served in many restaurants in Over-the-Rhine and on Cincinnati's West Side. As of 2021 it was still seen on local menus and at butcher shops, festivals, and sporting events. Cincinnati Bengals owner Mike Brown serves it at his annual media day event. Cincinnati food historian Dann Woellert calls the soup one of the "holy trinity" of local specialties, along with Cincinnati chili and goetta.

Campbell's once produced canned condensed version made of calf's head but discontinued it before 1960. In a 1962 interview with David Bourdon, Andy Warhol, commenting on Campbell's discontinued soups, said that Mock Turtle had once been his favorite.

== In popular culture ==
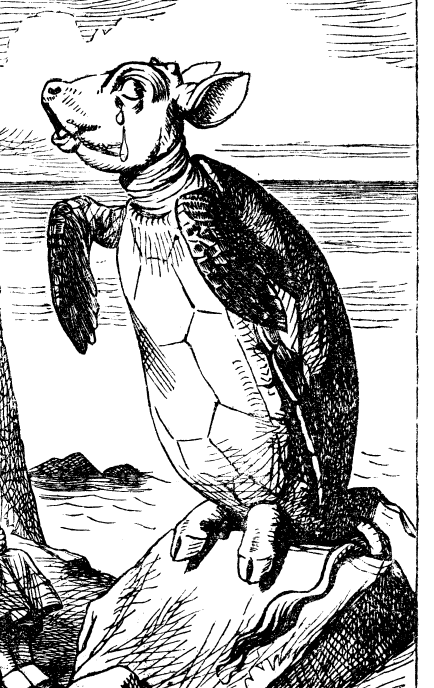
Mock Turtle

Lewis Carroll included a character, Mock Turtle, in his 1865 children's book Alice's Adventures in Wonderland. The character had the body and front flippers of a turtle with the head, tail, and back hooves of a calf.

In an episode of Gilmore Girls, Richard Gilmore requests mock turtle soup after his mother dies.

In the sixth episode of the seventh season of Are You Being Served?, the characters from the menswear and ladies department take over the canteen after the canteen staff walk out following complaints. They serve mock turtle soup (among other dishes). Young Mr Grace, the store owner, orders the soup and finds a frog in his.

== See also ==
- List of soups
