= Brain as food =

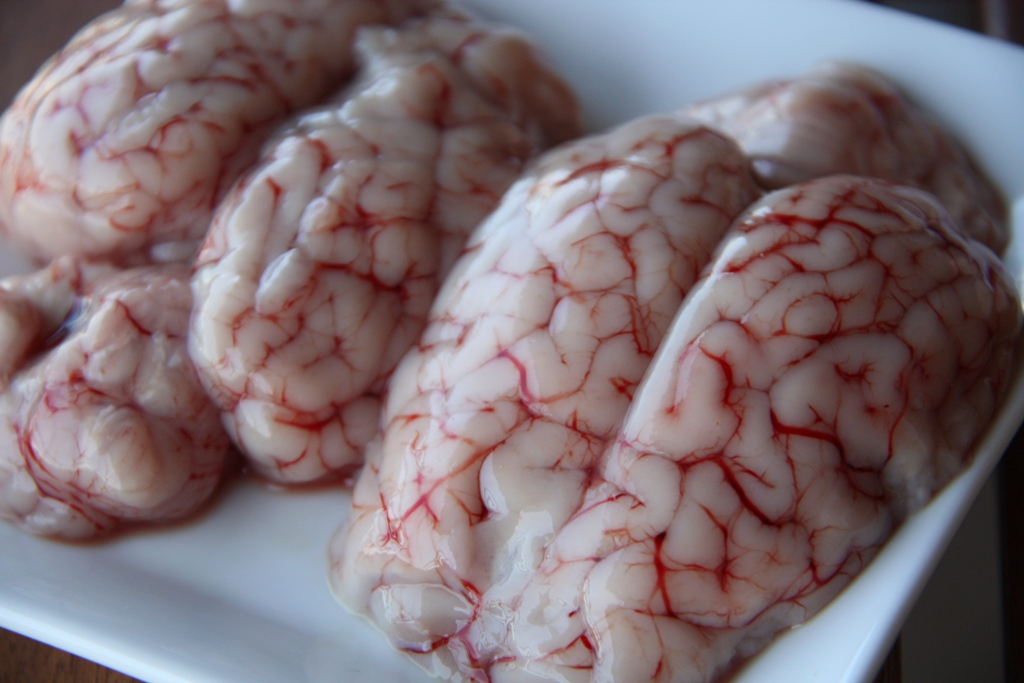
Lamb brains sold as food

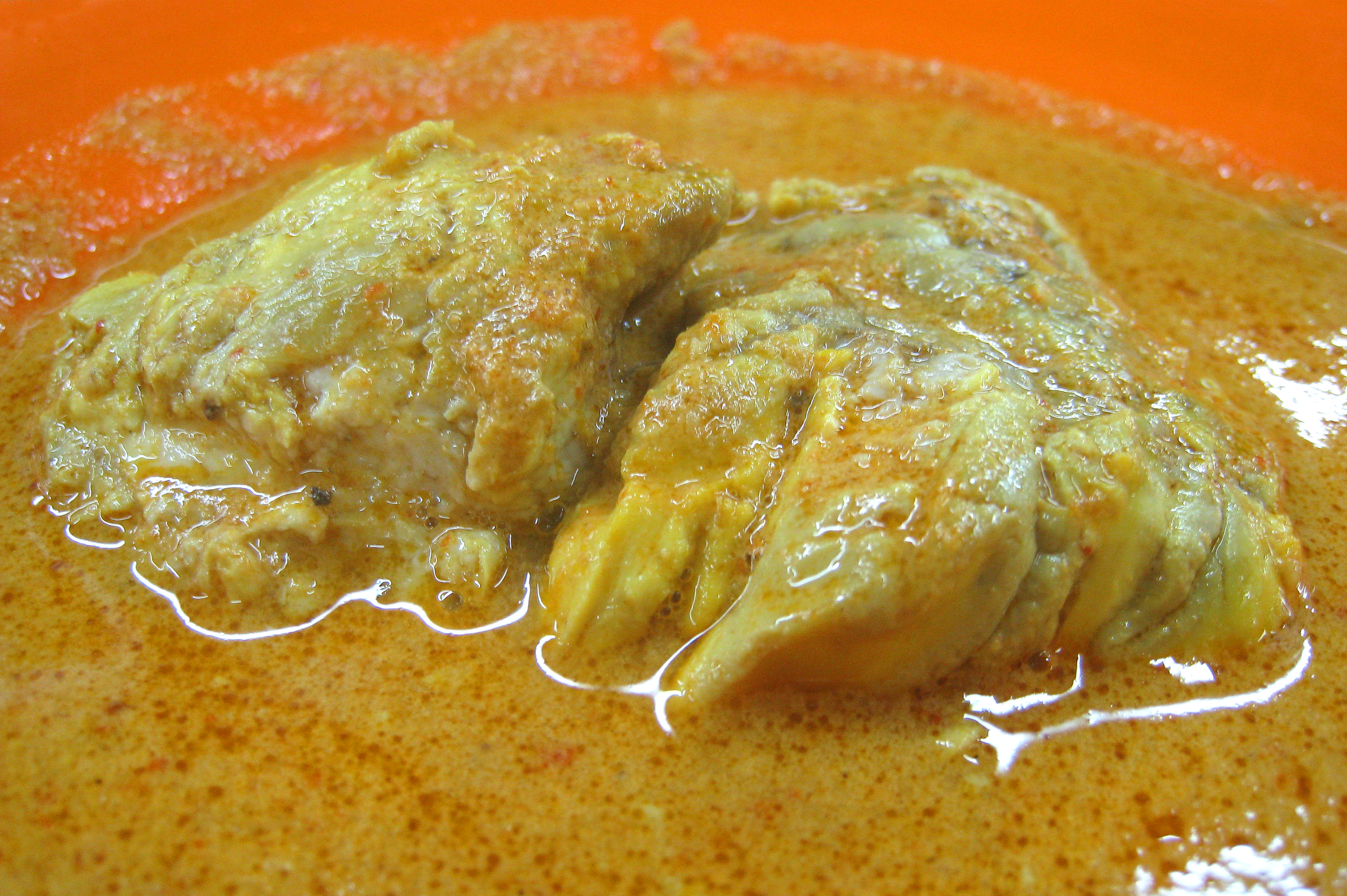
Gulai otak, cattle's brain curry from Indonesia

The brain, like most other internal organs, or offal, can serve as nourishment. Brains used for nourishment include those of pigs, squirrels, rabbits, horses, cattle, monkeys, chickens, camels, fish, lamb, and goats. In many cultures, different types of brain are considered a delicacy.

== Cultural consumption ==
The brain of animals features in French cuisine, in dishes such as cervelle de veau and tête de veau. A dish called maghaz is a popular cuisine in Pakistan, Bangladesh, parts of India, and diaspora countries. In Turkish cuisine, brain can be fried, baked, or consumed as a salad. In Chinese cuisine, brain is a delicacy in Chongqing or Sichuan cuisine, and it is often cooked in spicy hot pot or barbecued. In the southern part of China, pig brain is cooked into soup as 天麻豬腦湯 (tianma zhunao tang). In South India, goat brain curry (Telugu: మేక మెదడు కూర) or fry (మేక మెదడు వేపుడు) is a delicacy. Mumbai has its own version of brain masala curry.

Similar delicacies from around the world include the Mexican tacos de sesos. The Anyang tribe of Cameroon practiced a tradition in which a new tribal chief would consume the brain of a hunted gorilla, while another senior member of the tribe would eat the heart. The Minangkabau people in Indonesia prepare gulai banak ('beef brain curry') in a coconut-milk gravy. In Cebu City, Philippines, tuslob buwa (fried pig brain) is a popular street food. In Cuban cuisine, "brain fritters" are fried breaded brains. In the Ohio River Valley, fried brain sandwiches are popular, especially in the Evansville, Indiana, area. In Romanian cuisine, creier pane is a dish made using fried pig, cow or lamb's brains.

The brains of humans have been eaten in rituals. The Fore people of Papua New Guinea performed a funerary ritual involving those close to the dead eating the brain of the deceased until the 1950s, when the practice was banned by the Australian government. This ritual led to the transmission of the kuru disease.

== By type ==
=== Lamb brain ===
Lamb brain omelet, called ujjet zwaz in Syria, is a local cuisine, and is served in sandwiches in Aleppo.

=== Beef brain ===
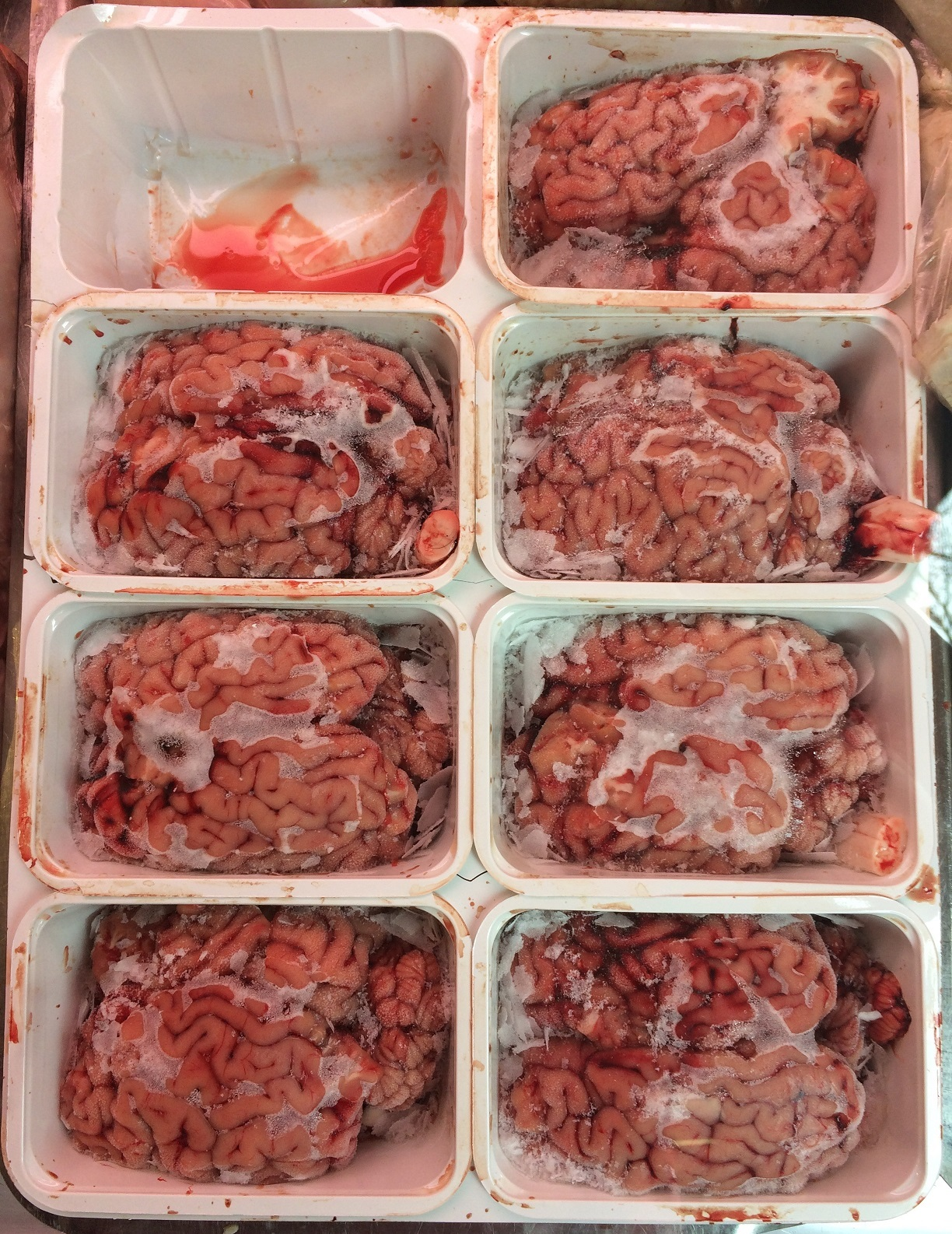
Cervelle de veau

Beef brains and veal (juvenile beef) or calf's brains are used in the cuisines of France; Italy; Spain; El Salvador; Mexico, etc. where they are called sesos in Spanish and are eaten in tacos and quesadillas; Pakistan and Bangladesh also in parts of India like Kolkata and Kerala, where they are known in Urdu and Bengali as Maghaz; Portugal; Egypt, where they are eaten fried and Indonesia.

Calf's brains (French: cervelle de veau) is a traditional delicacy in Europe and Morocco. It is often served with tongue, sauteed with beurre noir and capers, or mixed with scrambled eggs. In Italy, cervella fritte is a popular dish made of bite-sized batter-fried morsels of beef brain.

Outbreaks of bovine spongiform encephalopathy (BSE, commonly known as mad-cow disease) led to legislation to reduce risks of contracting the human variant of the illness by consumption of beef brains and spines.

== Nutritional composition ==
DHA, an important omega-3 fatty acid, is found concentrated in mammalian brains. For example, according to Nutrition Data, 85g (3 oz) of cooked beef brain contains 727 mg of DHA. By way of comparison, the NIH has determined that small children need at least 150 mg of DHA per day, and pregnant and lactating women need at least 300 mg of DHA.

The makeup of the brain is about 12% lipids, most of which are located in myelin (which itself is 70–80% fat). Specific fatty acid ratios will depend in part on the diet of the animal it is harvested from. The brain is also very high in cholesterol. For example, a single 140g (5 oz) serving of "pork brains in milk gravy" can contain 3500 mg of cholesterol (1170% of the USRDA).

== Prions ==
The term prion derives from "proteinaceous infectious particle". Unlike other infectious agents such as viruses, bacteria, and fungi, prions do not contain nucleic acids (DNA or RNA). Prions are primarily twisted isoforms of the major prion protein (PrP), a naturally occurring protein with an uncertain function. They are the hypothesized cause of various diseases, including scrapie in sheep, chronic wasting disease (CWD) in deer, bovine spongiform encephalopathy (BSE) in cattle (mad cow disease), and Creutzfeldt–Jakob disease (CJD) in humans.

Beef brain consumption has been linked to variant Creutzfeldt–Jakob disease outbreaks in humans which led to strict regulations about what parts of cattle can be sold for human consumption in numerous countries. Another prion disease called kuru has been traced to a funerary ritual of eating part of the brain among the Fore people of Papua New Guinea.
