= Tartar sauce =

Mayonnaise-based cold sauce

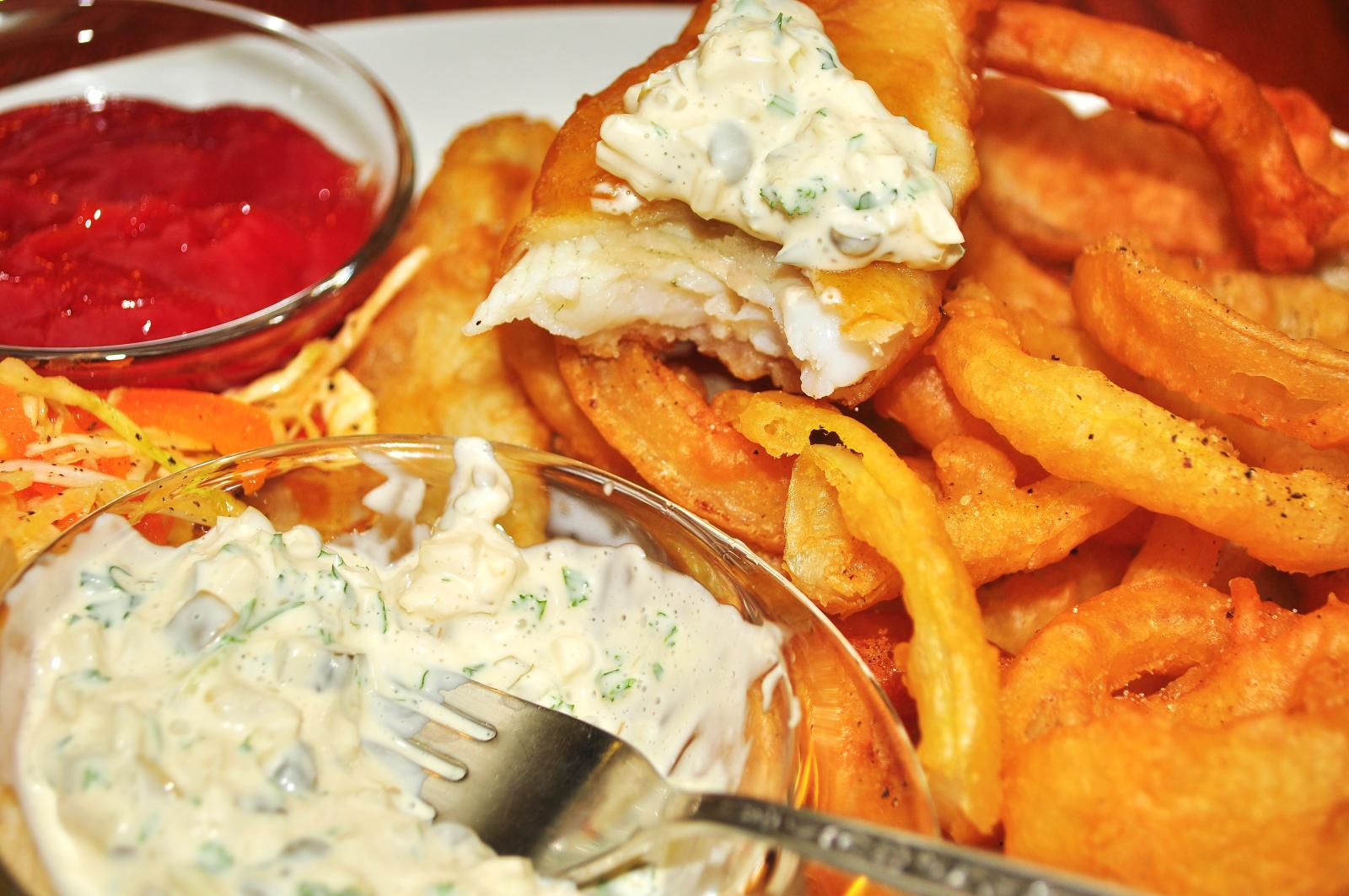
- Tartar sauce is often served with fried seafood dishes.
- Alternative names: Tartare sauce, tartare
- Type: Sauce
- Place of origin: France
- Main ingredients: Mayonnaise, gherkins (or other varieties of pickles), lemon juice and sometimes tarragon

Tartar sauce (French: sauce tartare), often spelled tartare sauce in the UK and other Commonwealth countries, is a mayonnaise-based condiment typically containing chopped cornichons or gherkins and capers, along with soft herbs such as tarragon, dill, parsley and chives. In North American, British, and French cuisine, It is commonly served with breaded and fried seafood such as fried fish, clams, and squid. In Europe, it is also served with breaded and fried or grilled meats such as Wiener schnitzel and veal trotter, and cold meat and seafood dishes.

== Composition ==
Tartar sauce is based on either mayonnaise or aioli, with certain other ingredients added. In the UK, recipes typically add to the base capers, gherkins, lemon juice, and dill. US recipes may include chopped dill pickles, onions (or chives), and fresh parsley; many around the world combine elements of both. Chopped hard-boiled eggs or olives are sometimes added, as may be Dijon mustard and cocktail onions. Hungarian variants may include sour cream (or plain cream), powdered sugar, white pepper and white wine, besides the other core ingredients.

== History ==
Tartar sauce is named for steak tartare (and thus ultimately named for the Tatars), with which it was commonly served in 19th century France. Recipes for tartar sauce have been found in English-language cookbooks dating to the mid-19th century, including a recipe in Modern Cookery for Private Families in 1860. It was also popular in Hungary in the late 19th century. Tatarska omacka is also very popular in Central and Eastern Europe, in countries like Slovakia, Czechia, Poland, Ukraine etc., where it is a beloved condiment.

== See also ==
- List of dips
- Remoulade
- Sauce gribiche
- Steak tartare
- Tarator sauce
