= Fried brain sandwich =

Sandwich of sliced calves' brains

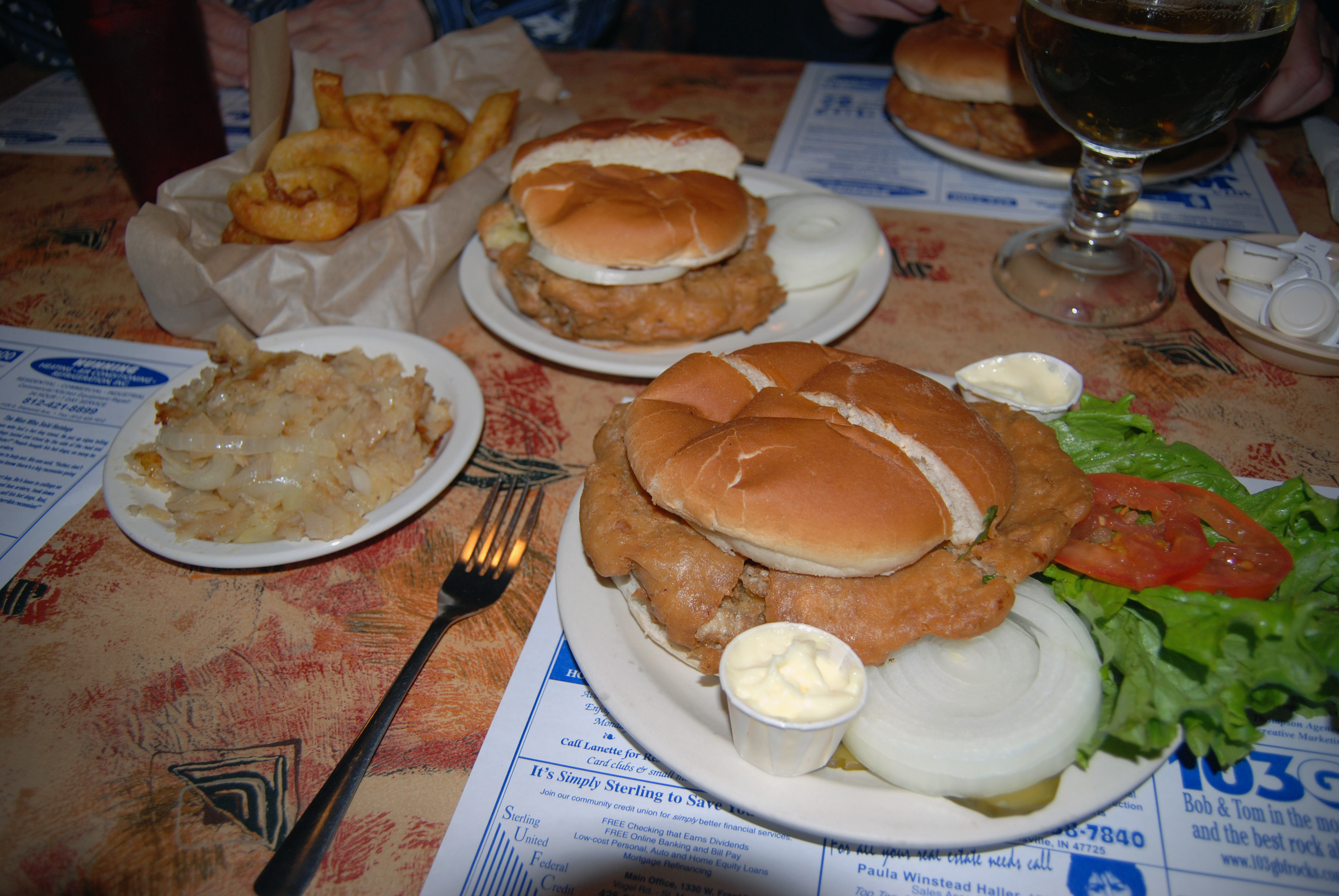
- Brain sandwiches, onion rings and German fries in Evansville, Indiana
- Type: Sandwich
- Place of origin: United States
- Main ingredients: Sliced bread, cow or pig brain

A fried brain sandwich is a sandwich of sliced calves' brains on sliced bread.

Thinly sliced fried slabs on white toast became widespread on menus in St. Louis, Missouri, after the rise of the city's stockyards in the late 1880s, although demand there has so dwindled that only a handful of restaurants still offer them. They remain popular in the Ohio River valley, where they are served heavily battered on hamburger buns. In Evansville, Indiana, they are still offered at several "mom and pop" eateries.

== Replacement with pig's brains ==
Brains from cows over 30 months old at slaughter are no longer permitted to be sold for human consumption in the United States. Some restaurants have taken to serving pigs' brains instead of cows' brains due to concerns regarding bovine spongiform encephalopathy, commonly known as "mad cow disease". Because pigs' brains are substantially smaller than cows' brains, the amount required for each sandwich increases. Each brain must be cleaned before being sliced and pigs' brains produce fewer slices.

== See also ==
- Eggs and brains
- List of delicacies
- List of regional dishes of the United States
- List of sandwiches
