= Eton Montem =

Etonian Custom

Eton Montem as depicted in The English Spy, published 1825. The image greatly exaggerates the size of the Montem mound.

Eton Montem (or ad Montem – literally to the Mountain) was a custom observed by Eton College from at least 1561 until it was finally suppressed in 1847, at the Montem Mound (or Salt Hill) in Chalvey, Slough, Buckinghamshire (later Berkshire). The mound is situated some 2 miles from the college near the London to Bath coach road, now the A4.

Montem is first reported in William Malim's consuetudinarium (book of customs) of 1561, when it seems to have been an initiation ceremony for new boys, who were scattered with salt (which can mean 'wit' as well as 'salt') at the mound.

By the 18th century, the ceremony had changed to a glorified flag day. Salt was no longer scattered on scholars; instead, pinches of salt and little blue tickets were sold to passers-by (the blue ticket – inscribed on alternate celebrations with 'Mos Pro Lege' or 'Pro More et Monte' – acted as a ticket of exemption from further contributions) for 'salt' – money that went towards the anticipated expenses of the Captain of the School (the senior Colleger) at King's College, Cambridge. Collecting was restricted to two 'salt-bearers' (also senior boys at the college) and ten or twelve 'servitors' or 'runners' who between them covered all the roads around Eton and Windsor.

Until 1758, Montem was held annually in January. The timing was then moved to the more clement weather of Whitsun Tuesday and the festival became biennial. In 1778, the frequency was reduced further so that Montem was only celebrated once every three years.

As time passed, the event seems to have become bigger, becoming eventually a semi-military muster of the whole school. Crowds and royalty (including at various times Queen Charlotte, George IV, William IV, Queen Victoria and Prince Albert) flocked to see the event. Towards the end of the ceremony's life, more than £1000 would typically be collected in salt, but this was before expenses, leaving substantially less for the Captain of the School to take to university.

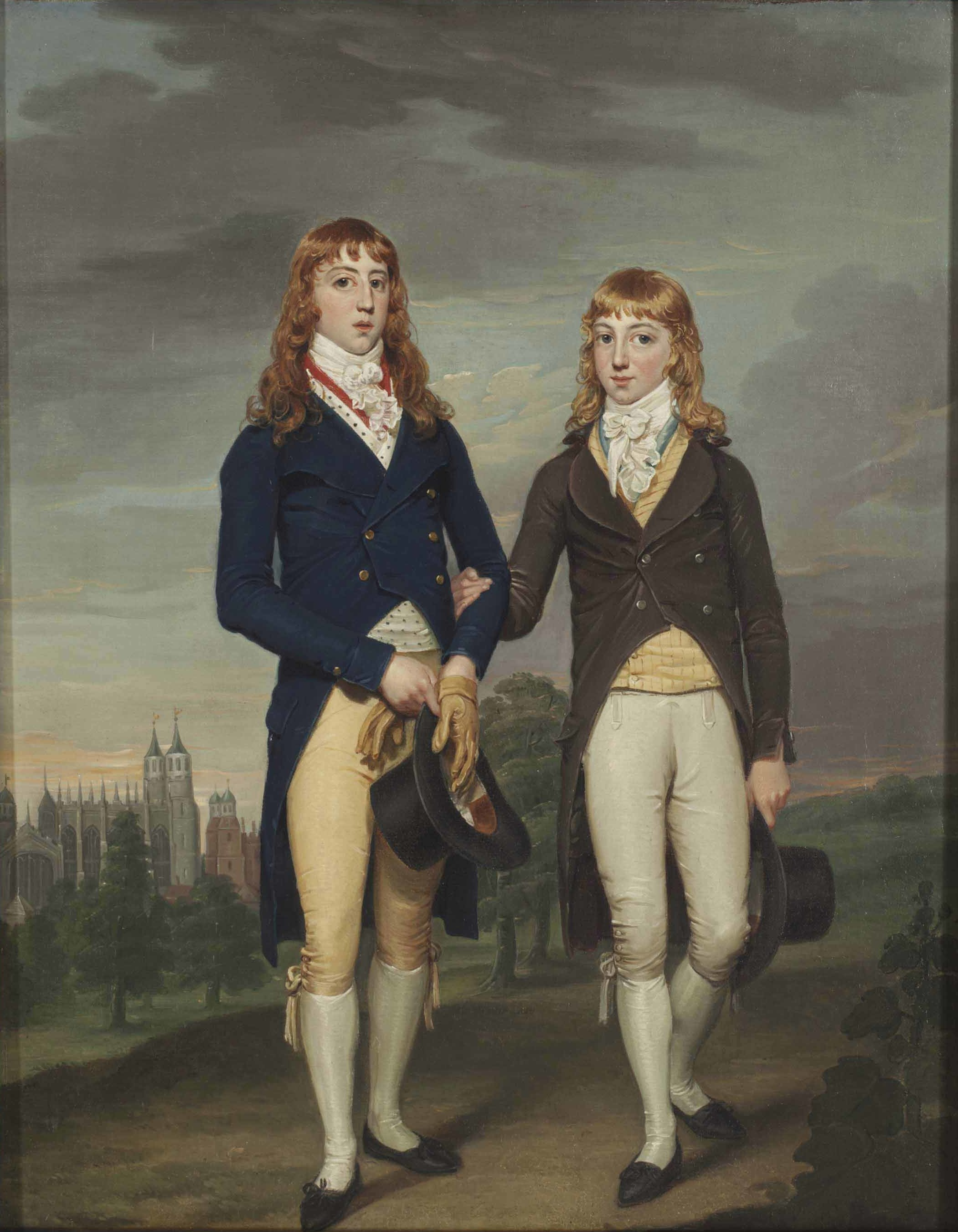
Eton Schoolboys, in ad Montem dress (Francis Alleyne, before 1815)

A feature of the later Montems was the publication of a "Montem Ode", composed for the occasion, and sold in the form of a broadside to visitors and Etonians. It typically consisted of doggerel punning rhymes, giving the names of the chief personages in the procession and alluding to their individual characteristics. It professed to be written by a local worthy who was styled the "Montem Poet", but in reality it was the production of some youthful wags in the school. The office of Montem Poet was held from the 1770s until 1834 by Herbert Stockhore of Windsor, an eccentric individual who had begun his career as a bricklayer. Arrayed in a tunic and trousers of patchwork, an old military coat, and a chintz-covered conical head-dress, with rows of fringe on it like the crowns on a papal tiara, he drove about in a donkey-cart, reciting his Ode, and flourishing copies of it in the air to attract the attention of possible customers. After his death, there was a contest for the vacant office, and a certain Edward Irwin was elected, the boys recording their votes as they came out of Church one afternoon.

The final Montems in 1841 and 1844 followed the opening of the Great Western Railway and attracted large and rowdy crowds from London. In view of this (and the much diminished profit to be made), headmaster Edward Craven Hawtrey and Provost Francis Hodgson abolished the custom before the 1847 Montem. The reduced anticipated profit can be seen from the fact that the potential beneficiary was compensated with a payment of £200.

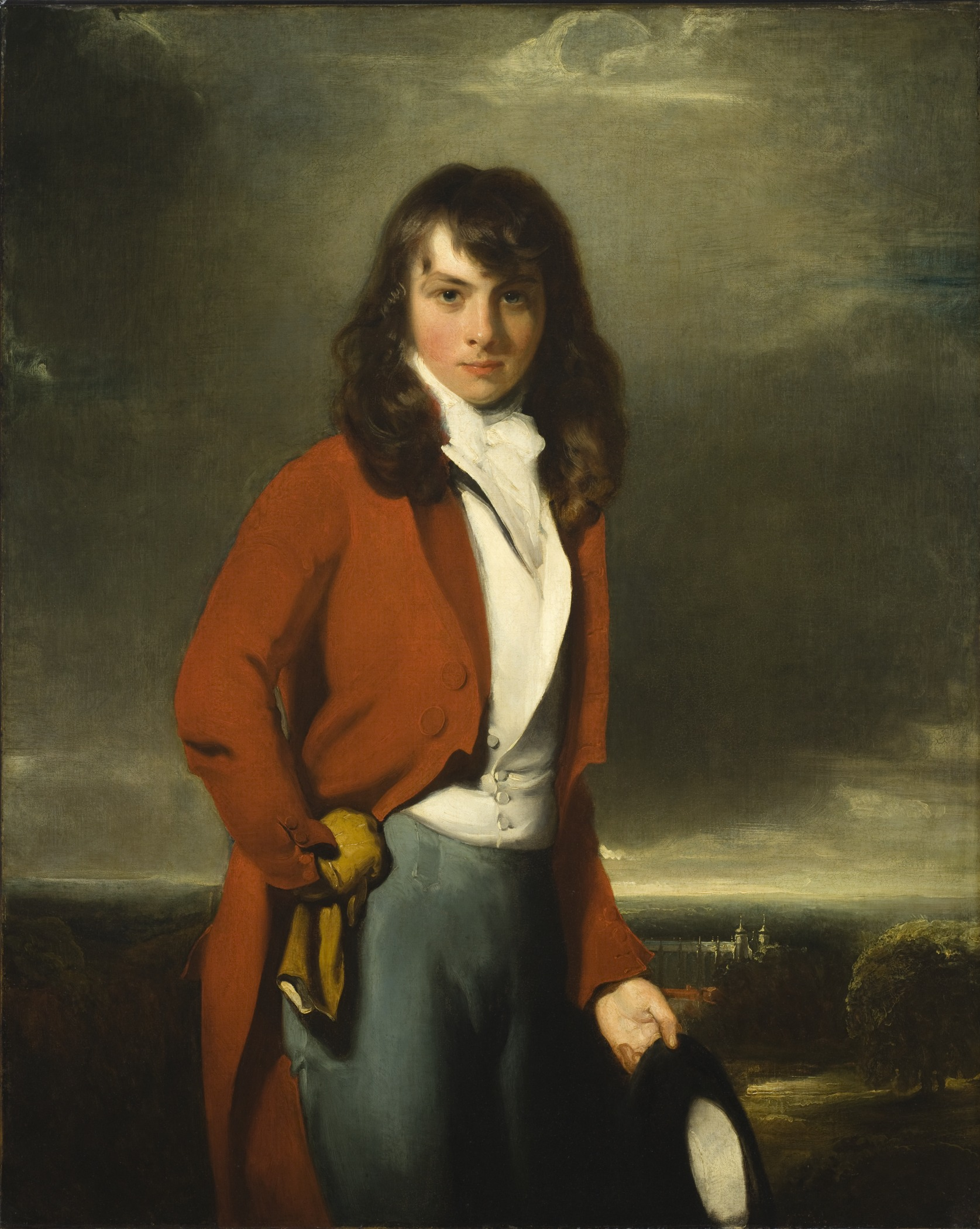
Arthur Atherley as an Etonian by Thomas Lawrence

In 1791, Arthur Atherley, later Member of Parliament for Southampton, had his portrait painted whilst at Eton College by Sir Thomas Lawrence – this portrait now hangs in the Los Angeles County Museum of Art. The portrait show Atherley in the uniform of captain of the Ad Montem club.

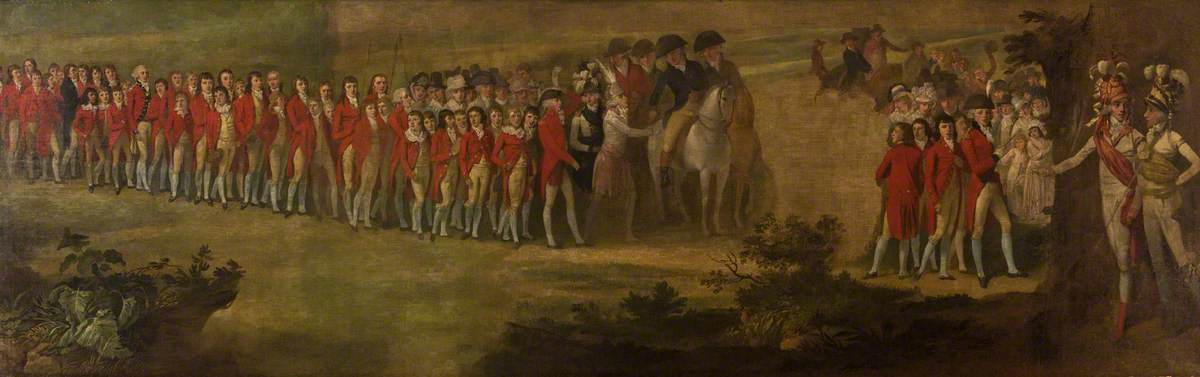
The Montem Procession, circa 1793

In a novel interpretation of the ceremony the early 20th century neo-druidic writer E.O. Gordon suggested that the Montem was one of several ceremonies with pagan origins that the college founder Henry VI stipulated should be followed at Eton. Gordon cites college statutes for the celebration of May Day and the autumnal equinox and suggests that these and the Montem ceremony were instigated by Henry to show his links back to Celtic kings. Gordon describes the Montem mound (which she also calls Sol's Hill) as one of several important Druidic places of assembly around London.

== Description of Montem by Benjamin Disraeli from his novel Coningsby, circa 1840 ==
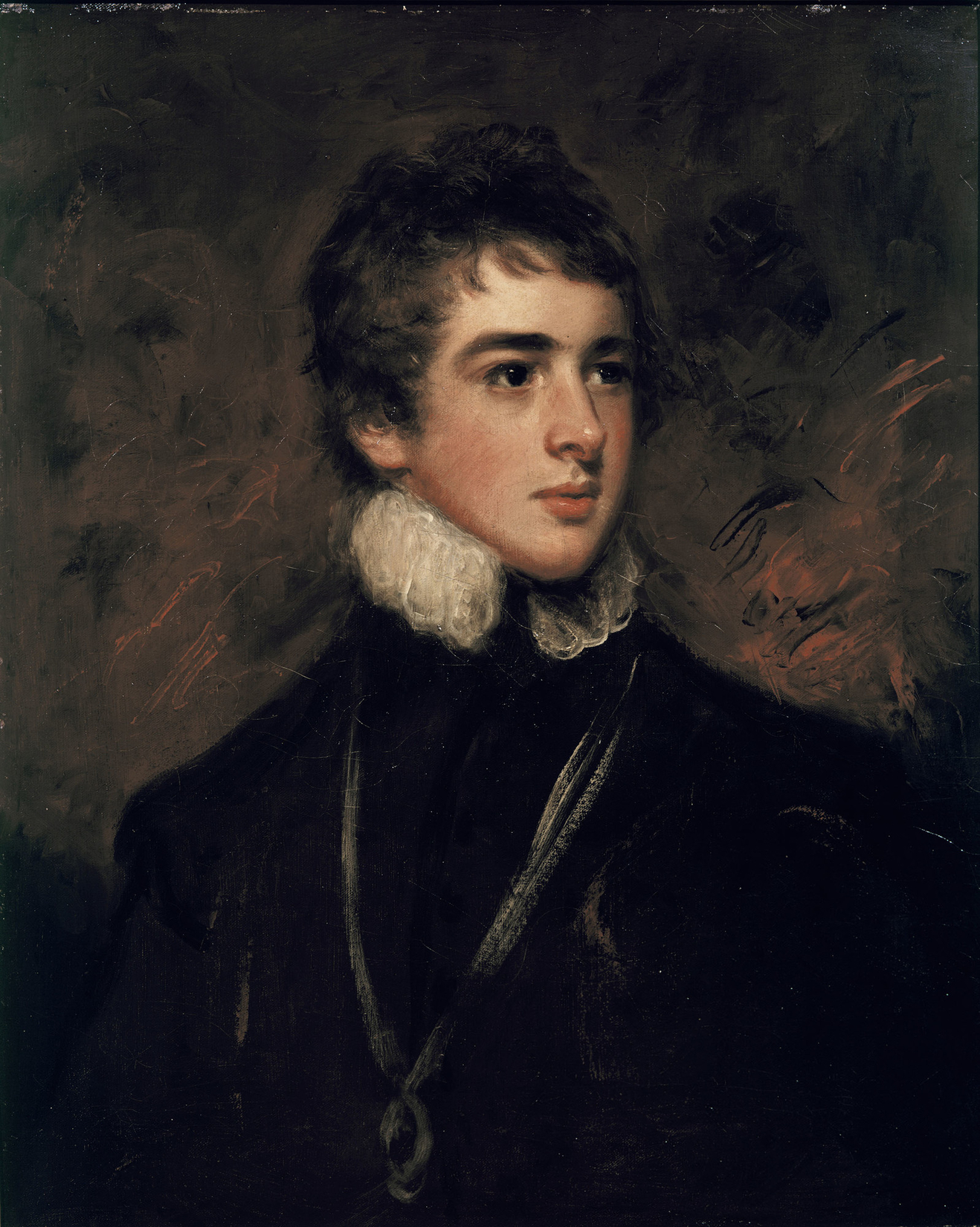
Portrait of William Lamb by John Hoppner, 1796. Lamb, the future Prime Minister Lord Melbourne is shown in a Tudor costume for Montem.

Five hundred of the youth of England, sparkling with health, high spirits, and fancy dresses, were now assembled in the quadrangle. They formed into rank, and headed by a band of the Guards, thrice they marched round the court. After quitting the College, they commenced their progress 'ad Montem.' It was a spectacle to see them defiling through the playing fields, those bowery meads; the river sparkling in the sun, the castled heights of Windsor, their landscape; behind them, the pinnacles of their College.

The road from Eton to Salt Hill was clogged with carriages; the broad fields as far as eye could range were covered with human beings. Amid the burst of martial music and the shouts of the multitude, the band of heroes, as if they were marching from Athens, or Thebes, or Sparta, to some heroic deed, encircled the mount; the ensign reaches its summit, and then, amid a deafening cry of 'Floreat Etona!' he unfurls, and thrice waves the consecrated standard.
