= William Colebrooke =

Canadian politician (1787–1870)

General Sir William Colebrooke KH CB

Governor of Antigua
- In office 1837–1842
- Preceded by: Evan John Murray MacGregor
- Succeeded by: Sir Charles Augustus Fitzroy

Lieutenant Governor of New Brunswick
- In office 1841–1848
- Preceded by: Sir John Harvey
- Succeeded by: Sir Edmund Head

Governor of Barbados and the Windward Islands
- In office 1848–1856
- Preceded by: William Reid
- Succeeded by: Francis Hincks

Personal details
- Born: William MacBean George Colebrooke; 9 November 1787
- Died: 6 February 1870 (aged 82) Salt Hill, Slough, Buckinghamshire, England

Sir William MacBean George Colebrooke, KH, CB (9 November 1787 – 6 February 1870) was an English career soldier and colonial administrator.

== Early life and education ==
The son of Colonel Paulet Welbore Colebrooke, R.A. (died 1816), and a daughter of Major-General Grant, he was educated at Woolwich, entering the Royal Artillery as a first lieutenant on 12 September 1803.

== Career ==
=== Ceylon and India ===
In 1805, he was ordered to the East Indies—first to Ceylon, then in 1806 to Malabar, and back to Ceylon in 1807. He went to India in 1809 and served with the field army there through 1810, becoming a captain on 27 September 1810.

=== Indonesia ===
Colebrooke next served in Java, and was wounded in the operations against the Dutch in that island in 1811. Here he remained under the British occupation and was deputy quartermaster-general in 1813, being promoted major on 1 June 1813.

He was sent as political agent and commissioner to Palembong in Sumatra, and on to Bengal in 1814. He resumed his old duties in Java in 1815, and was ordered to India on the conclusion of peace and the restoration of Java to the Dutch on 19 August 1816.

He served through the Third Anglo-Maratha War of 1817–8, and accompanied the expedition to the Persian Gulf in 1818. He returned to England in 1821.

=== Ceylon inquiry ===
From 1822 to 1832, Colebrooke was one of the commissioners of what was known as the Colebrooke–Cameron Commission (Eastern Inquiry): a long and elaborate investigation into the administration and revenues of Ceylon, where he resided on the business of the inquiry from 1825 to 1831.

=== Bahamas ===
On 9 September 1834 he became Lieutenant-Governor of the Bahamas; he went by way of Jamaica, spending about a month there and arriving at Nassau on a ship-of-war on 26 February 1835. His first speech to the Assembly was on 7 April 1835. He administered the colony during the days when slavery gave way to the apprenticeship system prior to its final abolition.

=== Antigua and the Leeward Islands ===
On 13 February 1837, Colebrooke was gazetted as Governor of the Leeward Islands, being at the time on leave in England. He assumed the government of Antigua and the other islands on 11 May 1837, and one of his earliest official acts was the proclamation of Queen Victoria. In this government, as in the Bahamas, he tried to improve education and reform prison discipline; he also urged the restoration of the old general council of the Leewards.

=== New Brunswick, Canada ===
On 25 July 1840, Colebrooke left Antigua for Liverpool and, after an extended leave, was, on 26 March 1841, made lieutenant-governor of New Brunswick. Here his tenure of office was uneventful, the question of the Maine boundary being the chief public matter affecting the colony at that time; he did, however, suggest a special scheme for colonisation, which had no practical results.

=== Barbados and the Windward Islands ===
On 9 November 1846, he became Colonel in the army, though he was not Colonel of artillery until later. On 27 November 1847 he was gazetted to British Guiana, but never took up the appointment, going instead on 11 August 1848, as governor, to Barbados, where he also administered the Windward Islands. Colebrooke worked for the suppression of crime and the improvement of the prisons. He also suggested a federation of all the Windward Islands, anticipating later proposals. In 1854, the withdrawal of imperial troops from the smaller islands caused some apprehension, but the peace of the islands was not really disturbed.

=== Return to England ===
He became Major-general on 20 June 1854. In January 1856 he relinquished his government and returned to England. He was promoted Lieutenant-general on 16 January 1859, and general 26 December 1865, and he was colonel commanding the Royal Artillery from 25 September 1859 until his death.

== Personal life and death ==
In 1820, Colebrooke married Emma Sophia Colebrooke, daughter of Lieutenant-colonel Robert Colebrooke (d. 1808), surveyor-general of Bengal. His wife died in 1851.

Colebrooke resided at Salt Hill, near Slough, Buckinghamshire, where he died on 6 February 1870. He had become K.H. in 1834, Knight Bachelor in 1837, and received C.B. (civil) in 1848.

Government offices
Preceded by Evan John Murray MacGregor	Governor of Antigua; 1837–1842	Succeeded by Sir Charles Augustus Fitzroy
Preceded by Sir John Harvey	Lieutenant Governor of New Brunswick; 1841–1848	Succeeded by Sir Edmund Head
Preceded by William Reid	Governor of Barbados and the Windward Islands; 1848–1856	Succeeded by Francis Hincks
