= Tuslob buwa =

Cebuano street food

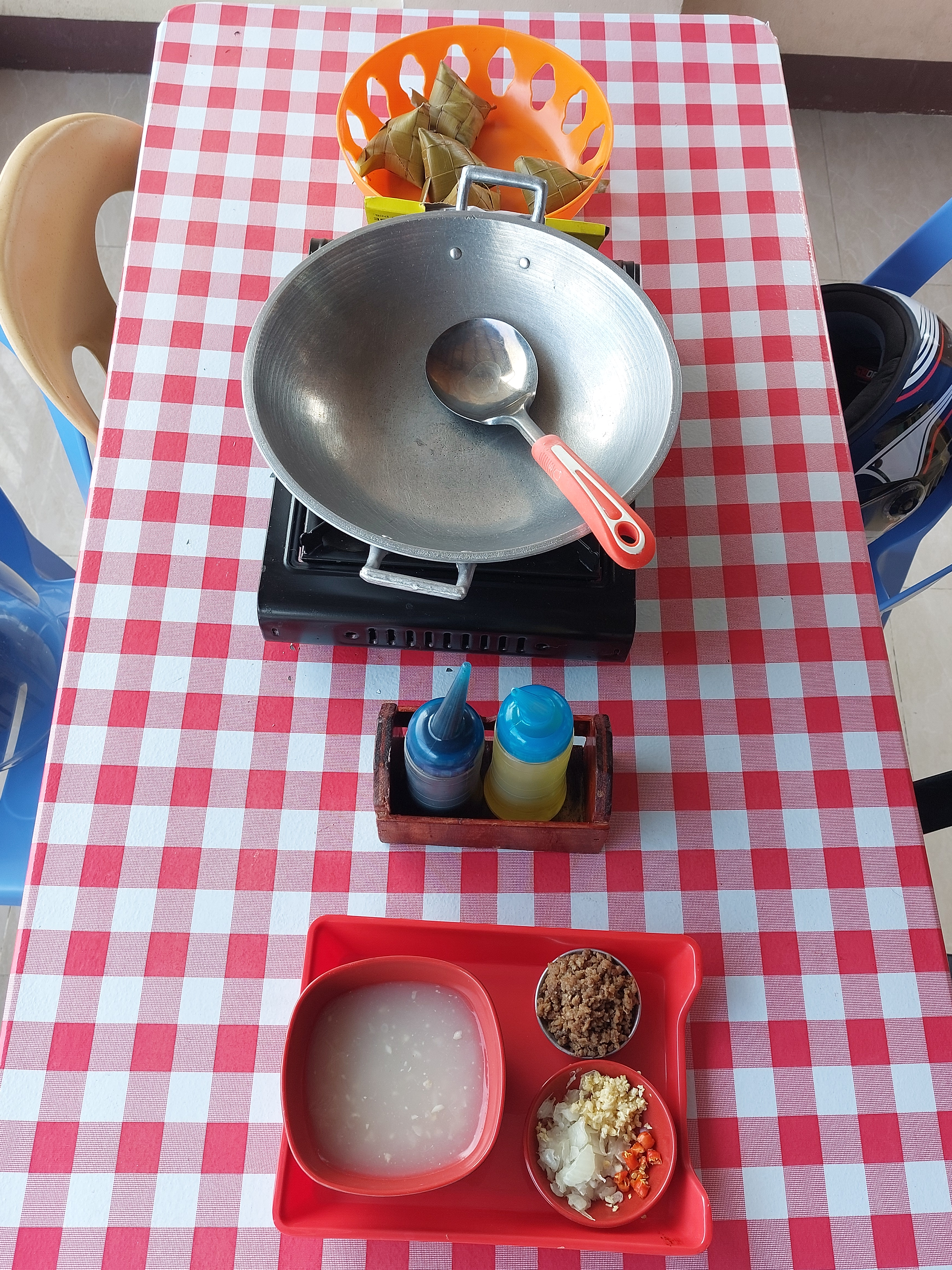
- Preparation of tuslob buwa in a modern restaurant setting
- Course: Snack, Main dish
- Place of origin: Philippines
- Region or state: Cebu City
- Serving temperature: Hot or room temperature
- Main ingredients: pig brain, soy sauce

Tuslob buwa (lit. 'dip in bubbles') is a Cebuano street food which originated from the barangays of Pasil and Suba in Cebu City, in the Philippines.

== History ==
The first tuslob buwa is believed to have been consumed as early as around the 1950s and is done during the cooking of sinudlan (ground pork sausage) wherein the diners would gather the resulting foam in the frying oil with pusô (cooked rice in coconut leaves).

A second variant became popular around the 1960s that made use of the pork offal (ug ginhawaan nga tuslob buwa). After cleaning the offal, it is seasoned with salt, garlic, black pepper, and bayleaf. The offal are then boiled in preparation for the cooking of adobo; the resulting stock from this boiling process is set aside and used for tuslob buwa. In the latter part of the 1960s, the sauce of humba would also become a popular variant of tuslob buwa.

The modern recipe became popular around the 1970s and consists of pork brain (otok) sauteed in oil with onion, garlic, soy sauce, and the aforementioned pork stock. Around 2014, the dish became more widely available with variants beginning to be served in nearby cities of Lapu-Lapu and Mandaue. It is also around this time that it started to be served and be featured in restaurants.

One Cebu City restaurant, Azul, garnered controversy in 2020 for having the name "tuslob buwa" registered before the Intellectual Property Office of the Philippines as a trademark. Residents of barangay Pasil and Suba criticized and disputed the eligibility of this trademark registration.

== Preparation ==
The ingredients are cooked in a wok (kawa) and simmered until the mixture becomes thick and produces bubbles. The dish is served with pusô (hanging rice) which the diners would dip in the prepared tuslob buwa. It is traditionally prepared as a communal food; the street food vendors (pungko-pungko) would cook the tuslob buwa in one wok where several people could share and the diners would pay by the pusô.

== In popular culture ==
Barangay Suba in Cebu City first held its Tuslob Buwa Festival on January 9, 2015 and it has since been celebrated annually every January during the Santo Niño festivities. On 2024, Barangay Pasil also in Cebu City launched its first ever Tuslob Buwa Festival Official Theme Song.

Tuslob buwa was featured on the Netflix TV series, Street Food in the Cebu, Philippines episode.

== See also ==
- Monjayaki
