= Demographics of Slough =

- Population pyramid of Slough
- Population: 149,400 (2016 estimate)

Population density in the 2011 census in Slough.

This article is intended to give an overview of the demography of Slough, a town and borough some 20 miles (32 km) west of London in the south of England.

Slough grew from the parish of Upton-cum-Chalvey in the county of Buckinghamshire. The statistics given below are for the successive institutional areas of the principal local government level that could be recognised as Slough. Since 1974, this has been the borough of Slough, a unitary authority now within the county of Berkshire. The borough comprises the large and unparished town of Slough, together with a small number of peripheral civil parishes.

In 2021, the borough of Slough had a population of 158,500 people, of whom 143,184 lived within the town of Slough.

Industry sectors of Slough over time

== Population ==
Year	Population	Notes
1801	1,018	Parish of Upton-cum-Chalvey
1811	1,083	
1821	1,268	
1831	1,502	
1841	2,296	
1851	3,573	
1861	4,688	
1871	5,940	
1881	7,030	
1891	7,700	
1901	11,453	Slough Urban District from 1894; area enlarged in 1900
1911	14,982	
1921	16,392	
1931	33,612	area enlarged in 1930/1931
1939	50,620	estimate (1941 census not taken due to World War II):Municipal Borough from 1938
1951	66,471	
1961	80,781	
1971	87,075	
1981	96,512	Borough of Slough in Berkshire and area enlarged from 1974
1991	101,066	
2001	119,070	Area enlarged in 1995: Unitary Authority from 1998
2011	140,200	Up 16.3% on the 2001 census, and 6.9% higher than the previous mid-2010 population estimate
2021	158,500	

== Ethnicity ==
Slough is a majority-minority town, with no ethnic group or broad multi-ethnic group being the majority, having been this way since the late 2000s. The White British make up the largest group at 34.5% of the population, having declined from a majority status of 58.3% in 2001, this decline coincides with the overall decline of White residents in the town from nearly two thirds in 1991 (72.3%) to less the majority (45.7%) in 2011. In conjunction, Asian British people have risen from nearly a quarter of the town's population in 1991 (23.9%) to nearly 40% in 2011, the largest of which is British Pakistanis who surpassed British Indians in 2011 as the largest Asian group. Black British residents have also increased, with the majority of growth coming from Black Africans who have increased from 0.4% in 1991 to 5.4% in 2011, of which surpassed the Black Caribbean group, who was 2.2% of the population, in 2011 as well.

Ethnic demographics of Slough over time from 1971 to 2021

Ethnic makeup of Slough by single year ages in 2021

Population pyramid of Slough by ethnicity in 2021

The following table shows the ethnic group of respondents in the 1991, 2001 and 2011 censuses in Slough.

Ethnic Group	1971 estimations		1981 estimations		1991 census		2001 census		2011 census		2021 census	
Ethnic Group	Number	%	Number	%	Number	%	Number	%	Number	%	Number	%
White: Total	78,367	90%	71,908	77.2%	73,749	72%	75,843	63.70%	64,053	45.69%	57,134	35.9%
White: British	–	–	–	–	–	–	69,441	58.32%	48,401	34.52%	38,101	24.0%
White: Irish	–	–	–	–	3,241	3.2%	2,489	2.09%	1,607	1.15%	1143	0.7%
White: Gypsy or Irish Traveller (Note: New category created for the 2011 census)	–	–	–	–	–	–	–	–	220	0.16%	237	0.1%
White: Roma	–	–	–	–	–	–	–	–	–	–	357	0.2%
White: Other	–	–	–	–	–	–	3,913	3.29%	13,825	9.86%	17,296	10.9%
Asian or Asian British: Total	–	–	17,186	18.4%	23,661	23.1%	33,621	28.24%	55,697	39.73%	74,093	46.9%
Asian or Asian British: Indian	–	–	9900		12941		16,719	14.04%	21,922	15.64%	30,209	19.1%
Asian or Asian British: Pakistani	–	–	6399		9428		14,360	12.06%	24,869	17.74%	34,317	21.7%
Asian or Asian British: Bangladeshi	–	–	39		101		171	0.14%	549	0.39%	910	0.6%
Asian or Asian British: Chinese (Note: In 2001, listed under the 'Chinese or other ethnic group' heading.)	–	–	205		266		349	0.29%	797	0.57%	594	0.4%
Asian or Asian British: Other Asian	–	–	643		925		2,022	1.70%	7,560	5.39%	8,063	5.1%
Black or Black British: Total	–	–	3,253		3,891		6,026	5.06%	12,115	8.64%	11,992	7.5%
Black or Black British: Caribbean	–	–	2361		2788		3,470	2.91%	3,096	2.21%	2,771	1.7%
Black or Black British: African	–	–	376		429		2,275	1.91%	7,548	5.38%	7,815	4.9%
Black or Black British: Other Black	–	–	516		674		281	0.24%	1,471	1.05%	1,406	0.9%
Mixed: Total	–	–	–	–	–	–	2,778	2.33%	4,758	3.39%	6,311	4%
Mixed: White and Black Caribbean	–	–	–	–	–	–	1,116	0.94%	1,667	1.19%	1,854	1.2%
Mixed: White and Black African	–	–	–	–	–	–	224	0.19%	607	0.43%	824	0.5%
Mixed: White and Asian	–	–	–	–	–	–	845	0.71%	1,429	1.02%	1,945	1.2%
Mixed: Other Mixed	–	–	–	–	–	–	593	0.50%	1,055	0.75%	1,688	1.1%
Other: Total	–	–	821		1,099		799	0.67%	3,582	2.55%	8,970	5.7%
Other: Arab (Note: New category created for the 2011 census)	–	–	–	–	–	–	–	–	928	0.66%	1,826	1.2%
Other: Any other ethnic group	–	–	–	–	–	–	799	0.67%	2,654	1.89%	7,144	4.5%
Ethnic minority	8,708	10%	21,260	22.8%	28,651	28%	43,224	36.3%	76,152	54.3%	101,366	64.1%
Total	87,075	100%	93,168	100%	102,400	100%	119,067	100%	140,205	100%	158,500	100%

Notes for table above

Distribution of ethnic groups in Slough according to the 2011 census.
White

White-British

White-Irish

White-Other

Asian

Asian-Indian

Asian-Pakistani

Asian-Bangladeshi

Asian-Chinese

Black

Black-African

Black-Caribbean

Other-Arab

=== Ethnicity of school pupils ===
Since statistics on the ethnicity of school pupils have been collected, White students, the majority being the native White British, have been in the minority. As such Slough schools were in a majority-minority state in-till 2018 when Asian British pupils became the majority, of which had surpassed White students in the mid-2000s. In the Asian British multi-ethnic group, British Pakistanis are the largest at 25.8% and are the largest group of all groups in the town. Black British school pupils increased in proportional size between 2004 and 2012 peaking at 9.1%, but have declined since then to 7.2% in 2022. Mixed school pupils have also been in proportional increase and now make up a little over 1 in 10 in schools (11.3%) from 5.9% in 2004.

Ethnic group	School year											
Ethnic group	2004		2008		2012		2015/16		2019/20		2021/2022	
Ethnic group	Number	%	Number	%	Number	%	Number	%	Number	%	Number	%
White: Total	7,670	44.3%	7,110	37.9%	6,820	32.4%	7,218	29.5%	8,422	25.8%	7,860	23.3%
White: British	6,940	40%	5,154	27.5%	4,581	21.8%	4,308	17.3%	4,453	13.6%	4,084	12.1%
White: Irish	200		158		148		114	0.5%	110	0.3%	81	0.2%
White: Traveller of Irish heritage	10		25		29		34	0.0%	25	0.1%	22	0.1%
White: Gypsy/Roma	70		54		110		158	0.6%	244	0.7%	240	0.7%
White: Other	470		1,719		1,951		2,762	11.1%	3,610	11.1%	3,433	10.2%
Asian / Asian British: Total	7,040	40.6%	8,360	44.6%	9,785	46.5%	12,108	48.6%	16,769	51.4%	17,725	52.4%
Asian / Asian British: Indian	2,830	16.3%	3,287	17.5%	3,758	20.0%	4,486	18.0%	6,565	20.1%	7,262	21.5%
Asian / Asian British: Pakistani	3,620	20.9%	4,164	22.2%	4,923	23.4%	6,191	24.8%	8,420	25.8%	8,687	25.8%
Asian / Asian British: Bangladeshi	60		92		116		149	0.6%	261	0.8%	256	0.8%
Asian / Asian British: Chinese	60		63		60		46	0.2%	49	0.2%	97	0.1%
Asian / Asian British: Other Asians	470		754		926		1,236	5.0%	1,474	4.5%	1,423	4.2%
Black / Black British: Total	1,100	6.4%	1,580	8.4%	1,925	9.1%	2,150	8.5%	2,454	7.5%	2,417	7.2%
Black: Caribbean	340		362		357		332	1.3%	343	1.1%	339	1.0%
Black: African	660	3.8%	1,133	6.0%	1,454	6.9%	1,658	6.6%	1,899	5.8%	1,847	5.5%
Black: Other Blacks	110		91		116		160	0.6%	212	0.6%	231	0.7%
Mixed / British Mixed	1,030	5.9%	1,190	6.3%	1,690	8%	2,125	8.5%	3,188	9.8%	3,817	11.3%
Other: Total	290	1.7%	391	2.1%	655	3.1%	911	3.7%	1,261	3.9%	1,349	4.0%
Unclassified	190	1.1%	37	-	173	0.8%	270	1.1%	551	1.7%	590	1.7%
Total:	17,320	100%	18,750	100%	21,050	100%	24,941	100%	32,665	100%	33,720	100%

== Country of birth ==
Top Countries of Birth - 2011 and 2021
Country of birth	2011 number	2021 number
England	83,230	87,350
India	11,544	17,107
Pakistan	11,244	14,418
Poland	8,341	8,912
Romania	467	3,551
Kenya	2,183	1,940
Sri Lanka	1,219	1,385
Somalia	1,247	1,336
Italy	621	1,125
Philippines	828	1,064

Population pyramids of country of birth groups in Slough

UK born

Foreign born: Total

UK born and foreign born in Slough in 2021. Males and females representing the UK born population while foreign males and females representing the foreign born population.

== Languages ==
Top 10 main languages spoken in Slough according to 2011 census and 2021 census are shown below.

Rank	Language	2011	2021
Rank	Language	Usual residents aged 3+	Usual residents aged 3+
1	English	96,508	110,212
2	Punjabi	8,247	9,527
3	Polish	8,249	7,724
4	Urdu	6,568	6,497
5	Romanian	401	3,275
6	Tamil	860	1,224
7	Hindi	825	1,148
8	Telugu	275	1,066
9	Arabic	703	983
10	Somali	938	772

== Religion ==
Religious makeup of Slough by single year age groups in 2021

The following table shows the religion of respondents in the 2001, 2011 and 2021 censuses in Slough. With Slough having one of the highest British Asian communities in Britain, the British Muslim, British Hindus and Sikh communities are all overrepresented compared to the national average.

Religion	2001		2011		2021	
Religion	Number	%	Number	%	Number	%
Christian	63,993	53.75%	57,726	41.17%	50,664	31.96%
Buddhist	294	0.25%	743	0.53%	776	0.5%
Hindu	5,340	4.48%	8,643	6.16%	12,343	7.79%
Jewish	139	0.12%	87	0.06%	85	0.1%
Muslim	15,897	13.35%	32,655	23.29%	46,661	29.44%
Sikh	10,820	9.09%	14,889	10.62%	17,985	11.35%
Any Other religion	358	0.30%	482	0.34%	716	0.5%
No religion	13,061	10.97%	17,024	12.14%	20,726	13.08%
Religion not stated	9,165	7.70%	7,956	5.67%	8,544	5.39%
Total	119,067	100.00%	140,205	100.00%	158,500	100.00%

Distribution of religions in Slough according to the 2011 census.
Christianity

Islam

Judaism

Hinduism

Sikhism

Buddhism

Other religion

No religion

== See also ==
- Demographics of the United Kingdom
- Demographics of England
- Demographics of London
- Demographics of Birmingham
- Demographics of Greater Manchester
- List of English cities by population
- List of English districts by population
- List of English districts and their ethnic composition
- List of English districts by area
- List of English districts by population density
