= Maghaz =

Offal dish originating from South Asia

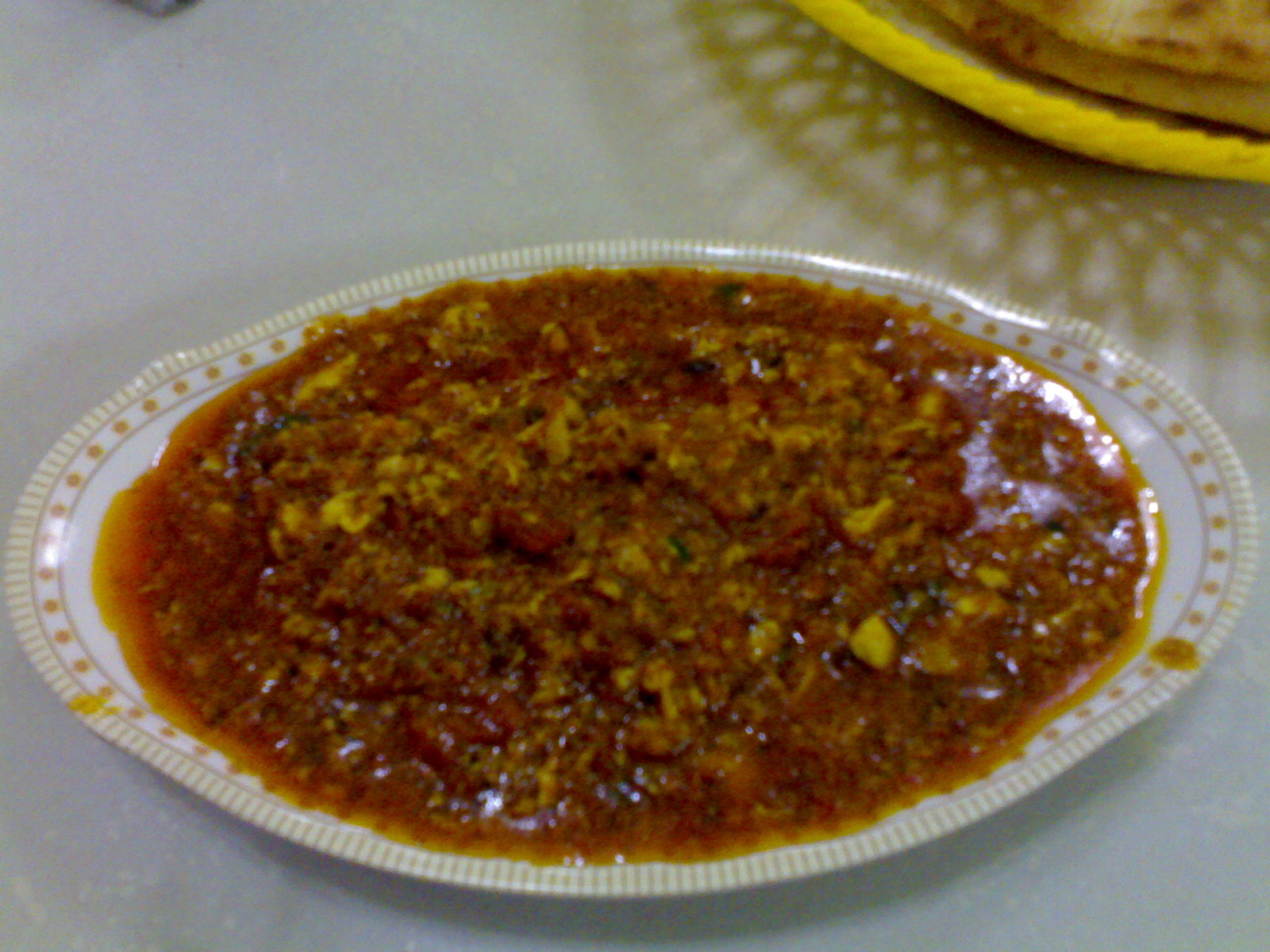
- A plate of Punjabi-style maghaz masala
- Region or state: South Asia
- Associated cuisine: Bangladesh, Pakistan India,
- Main ingredients: Cow, goat or sheep brain

Maghaz (Hindi: मग़ज़, Urdu: مغز, Bengali: মগজ), also known as Bheja (Hindi: भेजा, Urdu: بھیجا), is an offal dish, originating from the Indian subcontinent, popular in Pakistani, Bangladeshi, and Indian cuisine. It is the brain of a cow, goat or sheep served with gravy.

In the Hyderabadi cuisine of India, maghaz masala (bheja fry) is a deep fried goat brain delicacy. Mogoz bhuna is a popular dish in Bangladeshi cuisine, which is cattle or sheep/goat brain sautéed in hot spices. Almonds and pistachios are often added.
