= John Tawell =

19th-century English murderer

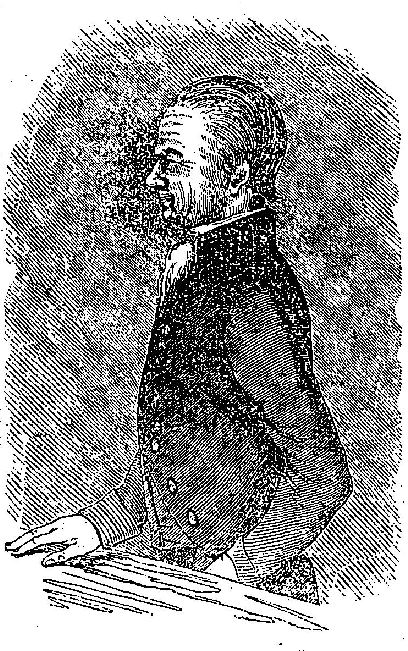
- Tawell at his trial, The Sunday Times, Sunday, March 30, 1845
- Born: c. 1784
- Died: 28 March 1845; Aylesbury, Buckinghamshire
- Cause of death: Executed by hanging
- Occupations: Shopworker, pharmacist
- Known for: Being the first murderer apprehended by means of telecommunications
- Status: Executed
- Criminal charges: Forgery (1814); Murder (1845)
- Penalty: Transportation (1814); Death (1845)

John Tawell (c. 1784–1845) was a British murderer and the first person to be arrested as the result of telecommunications technology.

Transported to Australia in 1814 for the crime of forgery, Tawell obtained a ticket of leave and started as a chemist in Sydney. There he flourished, and some years later left it a rich man.

Returning to England, he married a Quaker woman as his second wife. In 1845 he was convicted of the murder of his mistress, Sarah Hart, by administering prussic acid, his apparent motive being a dread of their relationship becoming known. Tawell fled the crime scene by train, but police were able to use the newly installed electric telegraph to circulate a description of the suspect ahead of his arrival at his destination, where he was identified as he left the station. He was arrested the following day and later sentenced to hang.

== Early life and criminal career ==
Tawell started out as a shop worker in London and for some years worked in a number of businesses owned by the Quakers, a strict religious society which he later joined. He was eventually disowned by the Quakers as a result of his relationship with a non-Quaker woman, Mary Freeman, whom he ultimately married and with whom he had two children.

In 1814 Tawell was charged with possessing forged banknotes from the Uxbridge Bank, potentially a capital offence. However, the Quaker-owned bank was opposed to the death penalty and, mindful of scandal, negotiated for Tawell to be allowed to plead guilty to a lesser offence. The result was that his sentence was commuted to fourteen years' transportation to the penal colony of Sydney. After eventually obtaining his ticket of leave, Tawell prospered, opening the colony's first pharmacy and conducting numerous property and business ventures. His family rejoined him in Sydney in 1823 and Tawell set about rehabilitating his reputation, being influential in setting up the first Quaker community in Australia and engaging in various philanthropic activities.

In 1838 the Tawells returned finally to London. Mary, who had been suffering from tuberculosis, died by the end of the year. Tawell had employed a nurse, Sarah Lawrence, who later changed her name to Sarah Hart, to look after Mary. Despite having remarried, he began an affair with Hart. This secret relationship with Sarah Hart bore two children, and Tawell installed all three in a cottage in Salt Hill, one mile (1.5 kilometres) outside Slough where he paid £1 per week to maintain them.

By 1844, Tawell was having severe financial problems. He bought two bottles of Scheele's prussic acid, a treatment for varicose veins containing hydrogen cyanide, and on 1 January 1845 travelled to Salt Hill, where he poisoned Sarah while sharing a beer in her cottage. She was found later that evening.

== Arrest by telegraph ==
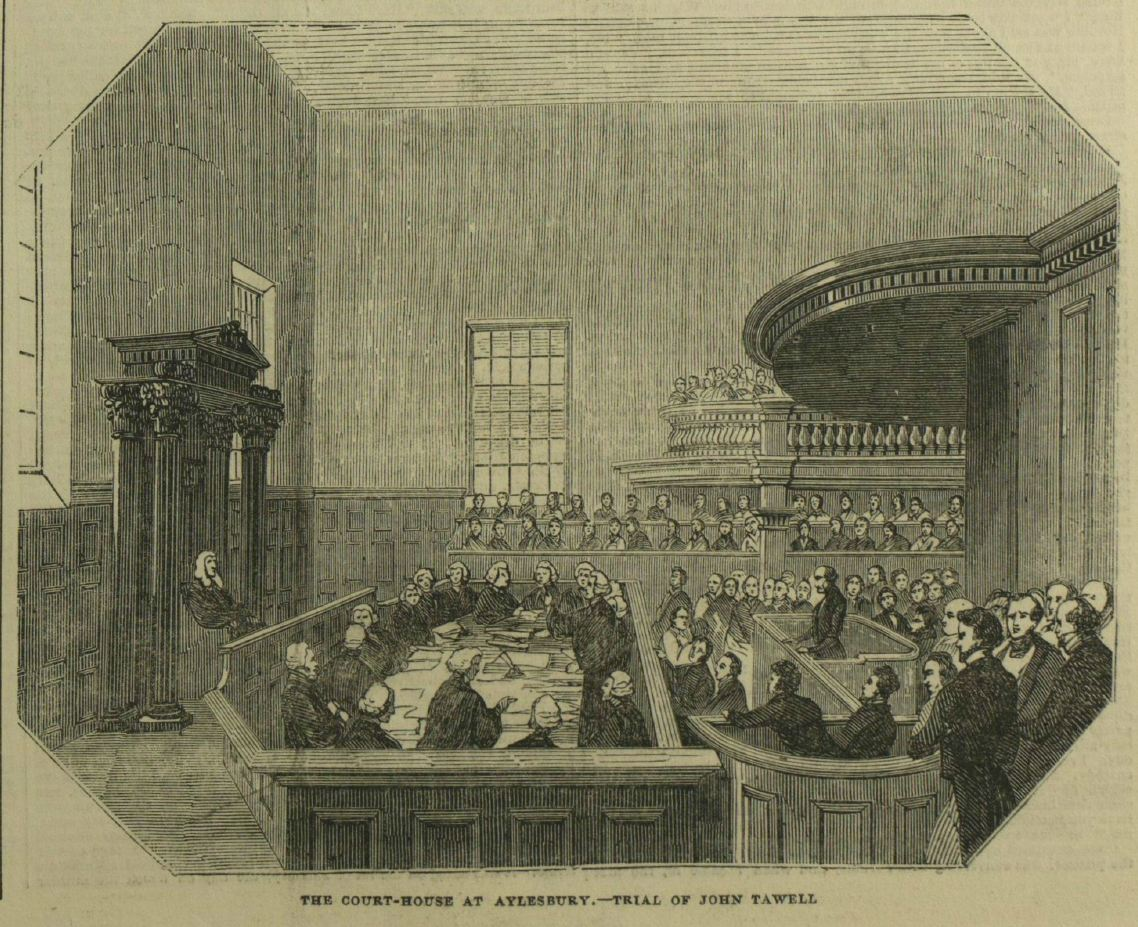
John Tawell's trial at Aylesbury Magistrate's court

A man in distinctive Quaker dark clothing had been observed to leave Sarah's house shortly before she died. Following his trail, the police found that a person answering his description had caught the train at Slough, heading for Paddington Station in London.

The police immediately used the newly installed telegraph to send a message to Paddington, giving the particulars, and desiring his capture. "He is in the garb of a kwaker," ran the message, "with a brown coat on, which reaches nearly to his feet." There was no "Q" in the alphabet of the two-needle instrument, and the clerk at Slough therefore spelt the word "Quaker" with a "kwa". "Kwaker" was eventually understood, but only after several requests to repeat.

When the train reached Paddington, the man (who was in fact Tawell) was followed from the platform by a sergeant of the railway police, William Williams, who had put on a long civilian overcoat. Williams followed him onto a New Road omnibus where Tawell mistook him for the conductor and gave him 6d for the fare. Tawell then went to a coffee tavern and later to a lodging house, all the while with Williams following. Williams came back the following morning with Inspector Wiggins of the Metropolitan Police and they eventually arrested Tawell in a nearby coffee house.

At Tawell's trial, his murky past history was revealed. His defence was handled by Sir Fitzroy Kelly, who tried to make a case that the prussic acid that killed Sarah Hart was ingested accidentally, from eating the pips of apples (a large barrel of apples was in the house). The implausibility of this argument led the distinguished barrister to be known as "Apple-pip" Kelly for the rest of his life. Tawell himself also tried to convince the jury that Sarah had poisoned herself.

Tawell was nevertheless convicted at Aylesbury Courthouse, and was hanged in public on 28 March 1845 in the Market Square at Aylesbury with huge crowds watching. A written confession was handed to the gaoler, but never publicly released, leading to various unconfirmed rumours as to his guilt or innocence.

== Legacy ==
The notoriety of the case brought the remarkable qualities of the telegraph to the public's attention. Its advantages as a rapid means of conveying intelligence and detecting criminals had been signally demonstrated, and it was soon adopted on a more extensive scale. Tawell's case was also significant as the first known homicide case where the criminal attempted to flee the scene of the crime by a railway train, and it was also one of the first cases in which prussic acid was used for a deliberate homicide.

The telegraph transmitter and receiver used to apprehend Tawell are preserved in the Science Museum, London.

In November 2025 the story of Tawell's life, and his relationship with Hart, was the subject of the play 'Apple Pips', performed at Queens Park Arts Centre in Aylesbury.

== See also ==
- List of convicts transported to Australia

== Bibliography ==
- James Dodsley (1846). Annual Register. pp. 365–378.
- Nigel Wier, The Railway Police, AuthorHouse, 2011 ISBN 1467000272
- Carol Baxter, The Peculiar Case of the Electric Constable, Oneworld, London, 2013
- Jill Buckland, Mort's Cottage 1838-1988, Kangaroo Press, Kenthurst NSW, 1988.
