= Salt Hill =

Area of Slough in Berkshire, England

Coordinates: 51.513°N 0.604°W

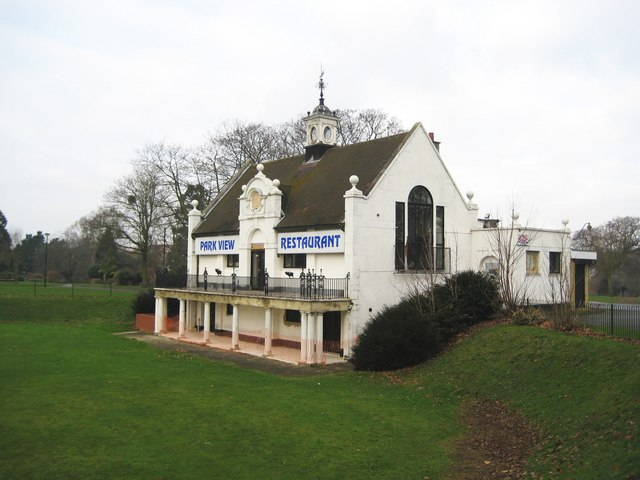
The Barn in Salt Hill Park

Salt Hill is a district within the unitary authority of Slough in Berkshire in the south of England, close to London. Before 1974, Salt Hill was part of Buckinghamshire. It is to the north of Chalvey and the Great West Road, surrounding Salt Hill Park.

The name Salt Hill is derived from Montem Mound in Chalvey, which was also known as Salt Hill, or Salts Hill.

== History ==
Salt Hill was originally a village approximately one mile west of Slough. Famous inns in Salt Hill included the Windmill Inn, visited by William Pitt the Younger and Samuel Taylor Coleridge, and the Castle Inn, which had a view of Windsor Castle.

In 1773, several commissioners of the Colnbrook Turnpike Trust died at Castle Inn due to food poisoning. They had eaten turtle soup.

In 1807, the French nobleman Antoine Philippe, Duke of Montpensier died here of tuberculosis on the way from London to Devon.

In 1814, the Prince Regent hosted breakfast at the Windmill Inn for the King of Prussia and his sons.

On 1 January 1845, John Tawell, who had recently returned from Australia, murdered his lover, Sarah Hart, at Salt Hill by poisoning her with prussic acid. With various officials in chase, Tawell fled to Slough railway station and boarded a train to Paddington. The electrical telegraph had recently been installed and so a message was sent ahead to Paddington with Tawell's details. Tawell was trailed and subsequently arrested, tried and executed for the murder at Aylesbury on 28 March 1845. This is believed to be the first time ever that the telegraph had been involved in the apprehension of a murderer.

On 6 February 1870 William MacBean George Colebrooke K.B. died at his home here. He, along with fellow Utilitarian Charles Hay Cameron had been responsible for the Colebrooke-Cameron Commission Help report, which brought constitutional government to Ceylon (later Sri Lanka) and marks the beginning of the modern era in that country. He had also presided over a constitutional crisis in New Brunswick and had been Governor of British Guiana.

Salt Hill Park once boasted great iron gates, which were subsequently smelted as part of the war effort during World War II.
