= Montem Mound =

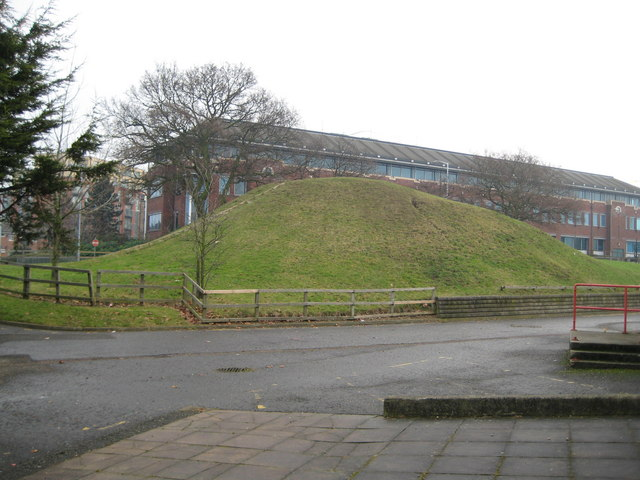
- Montem Mound, Slough
- Interactive map of Montem Mound
- Type: mound
- Cultures: Anglo-Saxons
- Location: Slough, Berkshire, England

Site notes
- Height: 6 m (20 ft)
- Length: 34 m (112 ft)
- Width: 34 m (112 ft)

Scheduled monument
- Official name: Montem Mound: a motte at Salt Hill, Upton-cum Chalvey
- Designated: 12 January 1976
- Reference no.: 1007928

The Montem Mound is an ancient mound of earth. It lies on Montem Lane, around half a mile west of central Slough, Berkshire, overlooking the Chalvey Brook, a minor tributary of the River Thames.

The mound is a Scheduled Ancient Monument. The age of the mound was a matter of debate: Slough Museum was adamant that it is a Norman Motte and Bailey outpost from Windsor. Alternative theories suggested that it is a much older "moot" point - a gathering place, while parallels might perhaps be drawn with the Taplow Mound, although that lies on much higher land above the Thames. In her 1925 book 'Prehistoric London. Its Mounds and Circles' E.O. Gordon asserted that the Montem was an ancient site of druidic assembly.

Until 1847, Eton College held an annual festival here, known as Eton Montem, also known as Salt Hill.

In 2017, archaeologists from the University of Reading found the site to be around 1,500 years old, placing the mound at the time of the early Anglo-Saxon period and making the mound a rough contemporary of Sutton Hoo and the nearby Taplow burial site.
