= Cippenham Moat =

Coordinates: 51.5089°N 0.6296°W

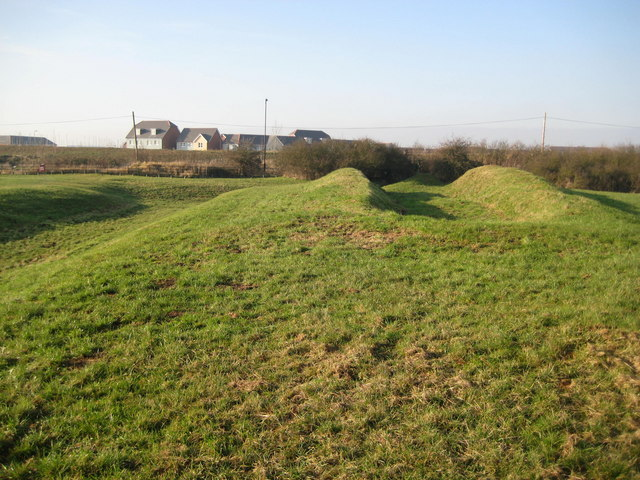
Earthwork remains of Cippenham Moat

Map showing the location of Cippenham Moat within Berkshire.

Cippenham Moat refers to the remains of a 13th Century Royal Palace created by King Henry III, located in the Cippenham suburb of Slough, in Berkshire. The area where the Palace once stood is still referred to and marked on maps as Cippenham Moat.

Richard, 1st Earl of Cornwall - brother to Henry III - had his honeymoon here, and later created a deer park. By 1575, however, Saxton's map shows the parks at Windsor and Langley, but not Cippenham.

It was rediscovered by farmers in early Victorian times and is now a listed monument.
