= Cippenham =

Suburb of Slough, England

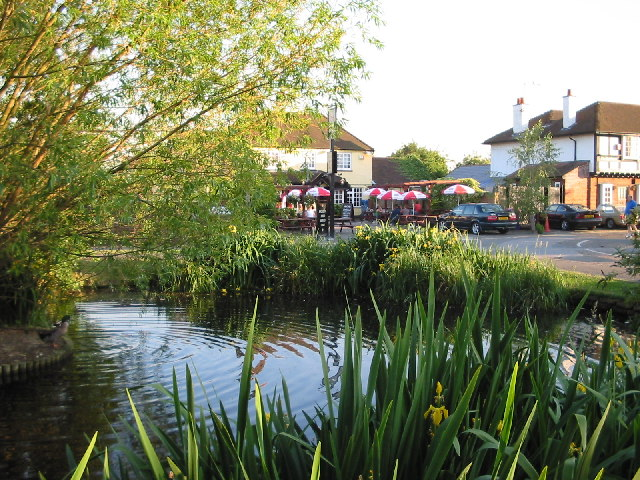
- OS grid reference: SU945805
- Unitary authority: Slough
- Ceremonial county: Berkshire
- Region: South East
- Country: England
- Sovereign state: United Kingdom
- Post town: Slough
- Postcode district: SL1
- Dialling code: 01628/01753
- Police: Thames Valley
- Fire: Royal Berkshire
- Ambulance: South Central
- UK Parliament: Slough

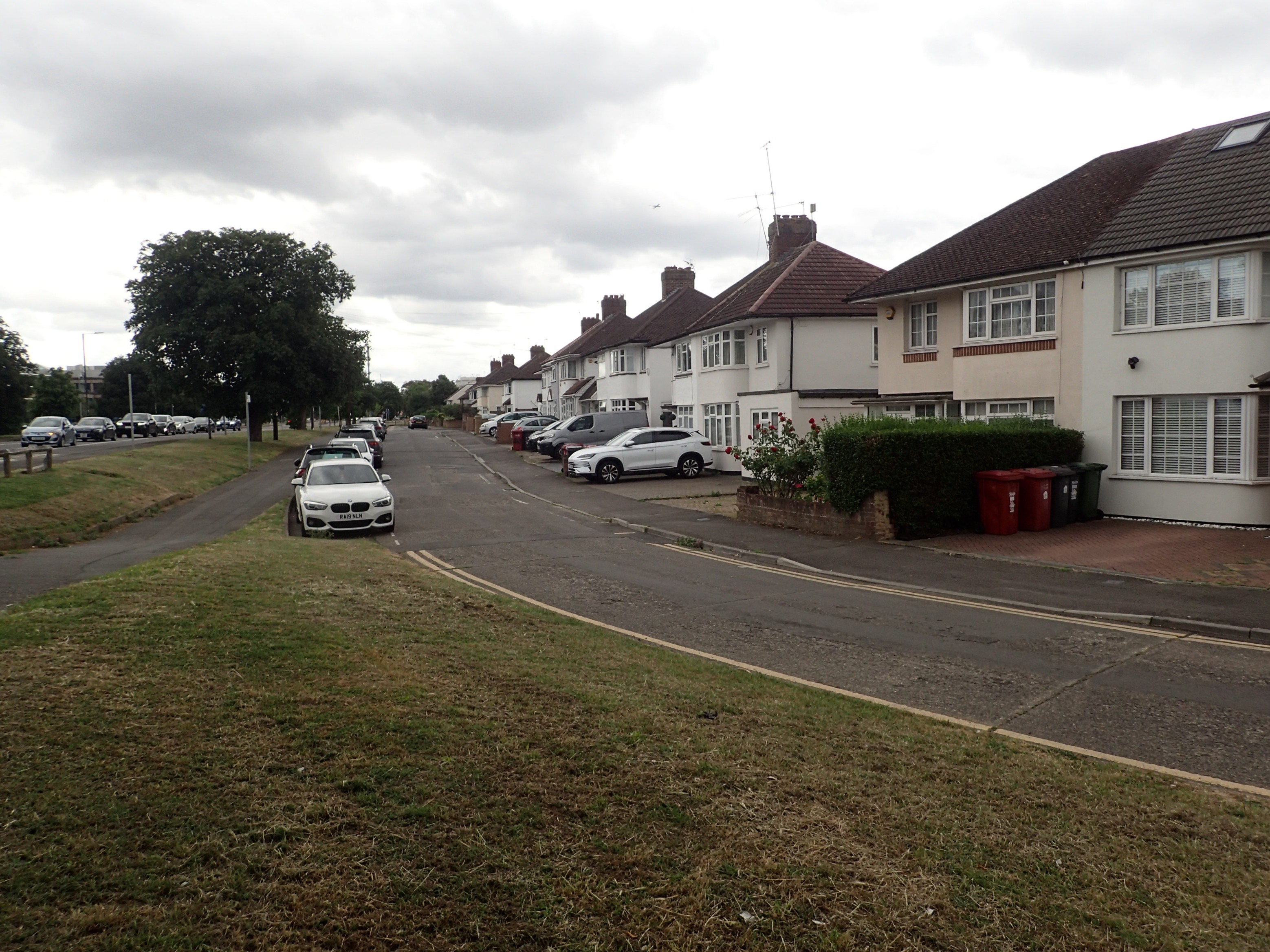
Cippenham next to the A4 (Bath Road); a view that many drivers will recognise

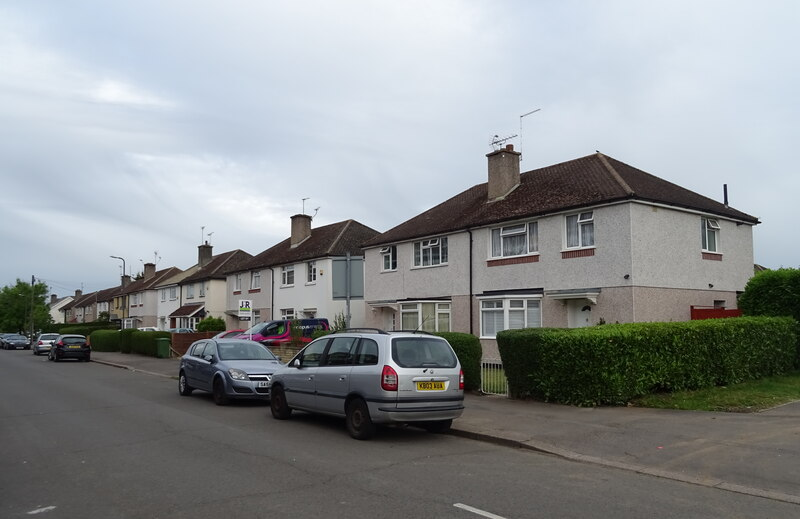
Typical houses on Harrison Way, Cippenham

Cippenham is a suburb of Slough. Close by are the neighbouring towns and villages of Beaconsfield, Farnham Common, Burnham, Gerrards Cross, Stoke Poges, Windsor and Taplow.

Originally part of the parish of Burnham in the county of Buckinghamshire, England, Cippenham was transferred to Slough in 1930, and therefore transferred to Berkshire in 1974. Slough became a unitary authority on 1 April 1998, when Berkshire County Council and the 1973–1998 Borough were abolished.

== Toponymy ==
The name Cippenham derives from the Old English Cippan-ham, meaning Cippa's homestead.

== History ==
King Henry III had a palace here, marked on modern maps as "Cippenham Moat" and very close to the M4 motorway.

Cippenham Green was where villagers grazed their cows, until the end of the 19th century, and is the only ancient village green left within Slough's boundaries. A 1925 document (Parishes: Burnham with Lower Boveney, a History of the County of Buckingham: Vol 3 (1925) pp 165–184) described Cippenham as some cottages and other buildings clustering around the green, with several large farms on the outskirts. Notable large houses included Western House, occupied by Mr Josiah Gregory. Western House is the name of the current primary school, which moved in April 2006 to new premises in the centre of the new Cedar Parks housing development. Other notable houses from the early 20th century include Cippenham Lodge and Cippenham Court. The Long Barn public house dates from the 17th century and was originally a farm outbuilding belonging to Cippenham Court: a market research company now occupies the original site of Cippenham Court. Cippenham Lodge still stands as a private dwelling in Lower Cippenham Lane. Much of the original farmland has now been built on in the major housing developments of Windsor Meadows and Cedar Parks, which is still in the final phases of development.

During the First World War a vehicle repair depot was established in the grounds of Cippenham Court Farm. After the war the site was sold to a group of businessmen called the Slough Trading Company, who changed their name in 1926 to Slough Estates Ltd. This formed the basis of Slough Trading Estate, the first trading estate established in the world.

== Sports ==
Cippenham was also home to Cippenham Sports Football Club who played in the East Berkshire Football League Division Two at Mercian Way Park.

The club was founded in 1923 as Cippenham F.C. and was a founder member of the Slough Town Challenge Cup and the old Windsor Slough & District League. During the early 80s Cippenham Football Club amalgamated with Cippenham Cricket Club and originally played on the village green, crossed by a road. This led to problems with cricket fielding and the disbandment of the cricket side of the club in the early 1990s, and the move of the football team to Mercian Way. In the 2007–08 season they reached the East Berkshire League Cup final for the first time, beating three Premier League teams on the way. However, they missed out on winning the cup after suffering a 1–0 defeat to Waltham FC in a closely contested encounter. The end of the 2009–10 season saw the club relegated to Division Two. Unfortunately, due to a struggle to attract players, Cippenham Sports folded at the end of the 2013–14 season. At present there are no signs the club will be revived.

== See also ==
- The Westgate School, Slough
