= Turtle soup =

Soup made with turtles

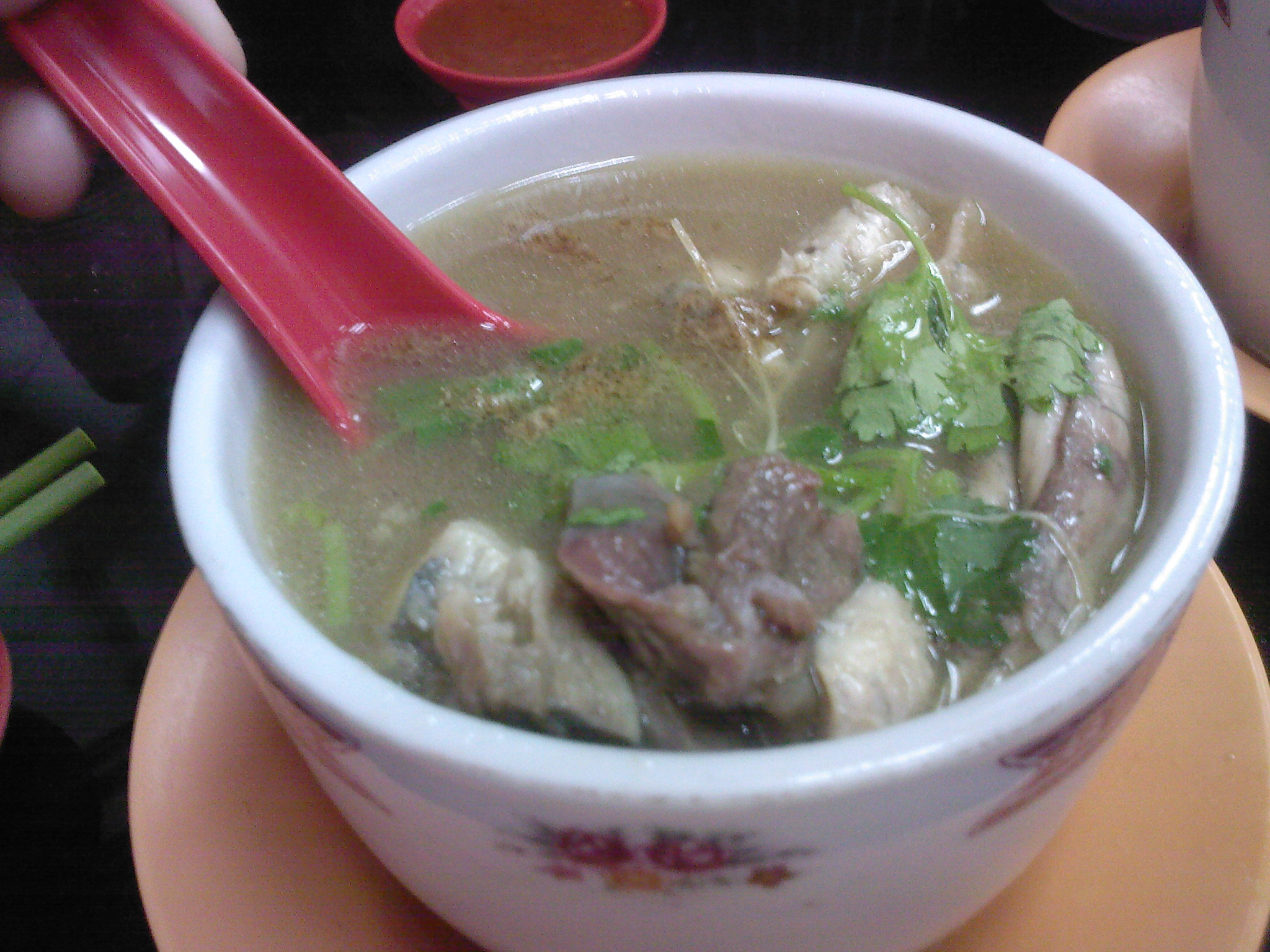
- Chinese turtle soup
- Type: Soup or stew
- Place of origin: Various
- Region or state: China, Malaysia, Taiwan, Japan, Singapore, Indonesia, and United States
- Main ingredients: Turtle meat

Turtle soup, also known as terrapin soup, is a soup or stew made from the meat of turtles. Several versions of the soup exist in different cultures, and it is often viewed as a delicacy.

== Culinary description ==
The principal characteristic of turtle meat is that the broth it is cooked in becomes extremely gelatinous once cooled. Turtle meat has no characteristic taste on its own, so the flavor of turtle soup depends entirely on seasoning. Mock turtle soup is made from other gelatine-producing meat such as calf's head and calf's feet.

== Versions ==
=== England ===
Turtle soup gained popularity in England in the 1750s but declined about 150 years later from overfishing. According to food historian Janet Clarkson, the dish, which she describes as one of several "noteworthy soups", became a symbol for civic dinners and

From 1761 to 1825, it was never absent from the London Lord Mayor's Day Banquet. It is probably not unreasonable to hold several generations of aldermen and other civic leaders responsible for driving the turtle to near extinction.

Green sea turtle became popular in England as "sea-tortoise" circa 1728: "Its Flesh is between that of Veal, and that of a Lobster, and is extremely pleasant ... They are frequently brought to England in Tubs of Sea Water, and will keep alive a long time." The earliest English recipes are for roast or boiled turtle, only later being used in a soup. About 1740–1750, it began to be widely imported to England, from Ascension Island or the West Indies. Samuel Birch is credited with being the first to serve turtle soup in London, spicing it with lemons and cayennes; it quickly became immensely popular, and Lord Dudley stated, "Of British soup, turtle always takes precedence in the list of honour". Giles Rose made turtle soup as follows: "Take your tortoises and cut off their heads and feet and boyl them in fair water, and when they are almost boyl'd, put to them some white wine, some sweet herbs, and a piece of bacon, and give them a brown in the frying pan with good butter, then lay upon your bread a-steeping in good strong broth, and well-seasoned; garnish the dish with green sparrow-grass [asparagus] and lemon over it." In Cookery and Domestic Economy (1862), the recipe begins as follows: "take the turtle out of the water, turn it on its back, tie its feet, cut off its head". By about 1800, a good dinner portion was 2.5 kilograms (6 lb) of turtle, live weight, and in London Tavern in August, 1808, 400 men ate 1,100 kg (2,500 lb) of turtle in their dinner soup.

According to Clarkson, "It is difficult to overestimate the magnitude of the demand for turtles" during the period of the soup's popularity. As many as 15,000 turtles were shipped live to Britain from the West Indies. Turtles became viewed as a fashionable and exotic delicacy, ranking alongside caviar. Because of its popularity, the green turtle population plummeted, and its cost rose correspondingly. Isabella Beeton noted in 1861, "This is the most expensive soup brought to the table". Thus, long before that time, mock turtle soup made from calf's head was widely adopted as a more economical substitute and became popular in its own right, with the two dishes sometimes being served at the same banquet.

The sixteenth-century English country house Burghley House is one of the few places in the country where the evidence for this former delicacy is still visible. On the wall of the kitchen are several green sea turtle (Chelonia mydas) skulls which date back to this practice.

=== United States ===
In the United States, turtle soup is a heavy, brown soup with an appearance similar to thick meat gravy. The common snapping turtle has long been the principal species used for turtle soup. In this case, the soup is also referred to as bookbinder soup, snapper turtle soup, or simply snapper soup (not to be confused with red snapper soup, which is made from the fish red snapper). In the Chesapeake Bay, the diamondback terrapin was long the species exploited in turtle soup manufacture. Canneries processed and exported tons of product until the turtle populations collapsed. Similarly in the San Francisco Bay, the Pacific pond turtle was the base of a minor industry with the canned product sent to eastern markets by rail.

Although turtle soup was considered a delicacy in Europe, during the colonial period, colonists fed these abundant and easily captured animals to servants, slaves, and livestock.

The 27th U.S. president, William Howard Taft, hired a chef at the White House for the specific purpose of preparing turtle soup.

As of 2016, various dishes made using turtle, including turtle soup, were served by a restaurant in Minnesota, mostly during Lent. The owner said that it was primarily older customers who had previously eaten turtle who ordered the turtle dishes; younger diners are much less interested.

== Poisoning ==
Eating the flesh of some marine turtles can cause a rare, but possibly lethal, type of food poisoning called chelonitoxism.

== See also ==
- Turtle farming
